= Morrell (disambiguation) =

Morrell is a surname.

Morrell may also refer to:

- Thule Island, south Atlantic Ocean, sometimes called Morrell Island
  - Morrell Point
- Morrell Reef, Antarctica
- Morrell (DART station), Dallas, Texas
- Morrell Avenue, Oxford, England
- Morrell's Island, an erroneously reported island supposed to be in the Northwestern Hawaiian Island
- Eucalyptus trees:
  - Red morrel (Eucalyptus longicornis)
  - Black morrel (Eucalyptus melanoxylon)

== See also ==
- Morrells Brewing Company
- Morrill (disambiguation)
- Morell (disambiguation)
- Morel (disambiguation)
