= Fatio =

Fatio is a surname, and may refer to:

- Francis Philip Fatio, 18th–19th-century Swiss colonist of Florida
- Jean-Christophe Fatio de Duillier, 17th–18th-century Genevan natural philosopher
- Johannes Fatio, 17th-century Swiss surgeon
- Louise Fatio, 20th-century children's author
- Maurice Fatio, 20th-century American architect
- Nicolas Fatio de Duillier, 17th–18th-century Swiss mathematician and astronomer
- Pierre Fatio, 17th–18th-century Genevan politician
- Victor Fatio, 19th–20th-century Swiss zoologist
- Alfred Morel-Fatio, 19th–20th-century French linguist
- Antoine Léon Morel-Fatio, 19th-century French naval painter

== See also ==
- Facio
- Faccio
- Ximenez-Fatio House
