= Morel-Fatio =

Morel-Fatio is a surname. Notable people with the surname include:

- Antoine Léon Morel-Fatio (1810–1871), French painter
- Alfred Morel-Fatio (1850–1924), French hispanist

== See also ==
- Morel (surname)
- Fatio
