= Morell =

Morell may refer to:

- Morell (name)
- Morell, Prince Edward Island, Canada
- Morell River, County Kildare, Ireland
- Morell Bridge, an arch bridge over the Yarra River in South Yarra, Melbourne, Victoria, Australia
- El Morell, Tarragona, Catalonia, Spain
- The Morells, a Springfield, Missouri rock band

== See also ==
- Morel (disambiguation)
- Morrell
- Morrill (disambiguation)
