= Morel (disambiguation) =

Morel is a common name for Morchella, a genus of edible wild mushrooms

Mushrooms that look like morels/Morchella are known as false morels.

Morel may also refer to:

== Places ==
- Mörel, Germany, municipality in Schleswig-Holstein
- Mörel, Switzerland a former municipality in Valais, now part of Mörel-Filet
- Morel, Les Allues, a hamlet and ski resort in the French Alps, close to Méribel
- Morel River, a river in India

== Other uses ==
- Morel (surname), a surname
- Morel (horse), a British Thoroughbred racehorse
- Morel's Invention, a novel by Argentine writer Adolfo Bioy Casares.
- Morel Mackernasey, a fictional character in the manga series Hunter × Hunter
- O Caso Morel ("The Morel Case"), a novel by Brazilian writer Rubem Fonseca.

== See also ==
- Moral (disambiguation)
- Morell (disambiguation)
- Morrel (a family name in The Count of Monte Cristo)
- Morrell (surname)
- Mary Morrill (c. 1620–1704), maternal grandmother of Benjamin Franklin
