= John Morrell =

John Morrell may refer to:

- John Bowes Morrell (1873–1963), English author and historian
- John Morrell (rugby league), rugby league footballer who played in the 1920s
- John Morrell & Co, Sioux Falls, South Dakota meat processing company purchased by Smithfield Foods in 1995
- John Morrell, Royal Navy lieutenant, father of Arthur Fleming Morrell
- John Arthur Morrell, who became a commander and served aboard HMS Eagle during an 1806 attack on Naples, brother of Arthur Fleming Morrell
