= Spring Lane Building, University of York =

Coordinates: 53.9476°N 1.0512°W

Spring Lane Building
- Interactive map of the Spring Lane Building area
- Etymology: Spring Lane, York

General information
- Location: University of York, Heslington, Yorkshire, England
- Construction started: Autumn 2015
- Completed: September 2016
- Cost: £8 million

Technical details
- Floor count: 3
- Floor area: 4,240 sqm

Design and construction
- Architect: David Speddings
- Architecture firm: Race Cottam
- Main contractor: Graham Construction

Other information
- Number of rooms: 26 seminar rooms
- Facilities: 350 seat lecture hall

The Spring Lane Building is located between the Barrick Saul building and Derwent College, in the centre of University of York's Campus West. The building was designed by Race Cottam, and provide teaching space as well as study spots.

== Design ==
The building consists of three floors with a central atrium the height of the building acting as the main circulation space being described as a glazed over 'street'. The ground and first floors contain seminar rooms and the 350-seat lecture hall. The second floor contains more seminar rooms and a social learning space. Study locations are spread across all three levels of the building.

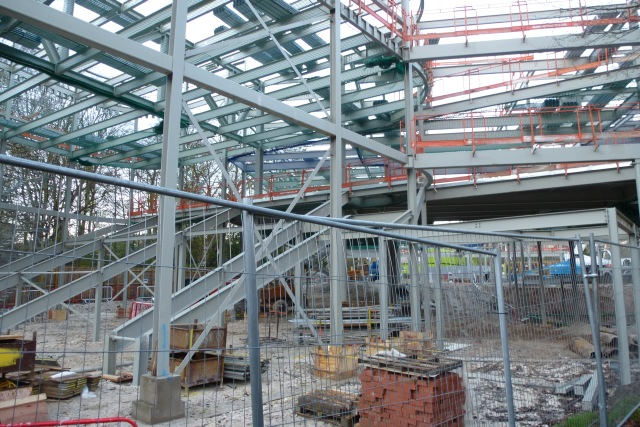
Spring Lane Building during construction

The front entrance of the building faces the Library and has a supported portico. The rest of the building consisting of large sections of glazing. The section of the building containing the lecture room is highlighted in red brick while the rest of the building consists of more muted tones.

== Etymology ==
Spring Lane used to connect what is now University Road with Main Street. Spring Lane is shown on maps from at least 1853, initially running parallel to the wall at the bottom of the gardens at Heslington Hall, then goes roughly straight North, through Spring Wood. By 1953, its route had hardly changed. With the arrival of the university, it was impractical for the lane to remain as it would sever the campus in two. However, the route of the lane continued as a footpath, with Spring Wood being effectively expanded with the wooded area expanding. The site for the Spring Lane Building is on the West side of the North end of the footpath, so the decision was made to use the name of the old lane.

The construction of a car park stops the path short of University Road. It now ends on Harewood Way, named after Lord Harewood, the first chancellor of the university.
