= Johannes Fatio =

Swiss surgeon

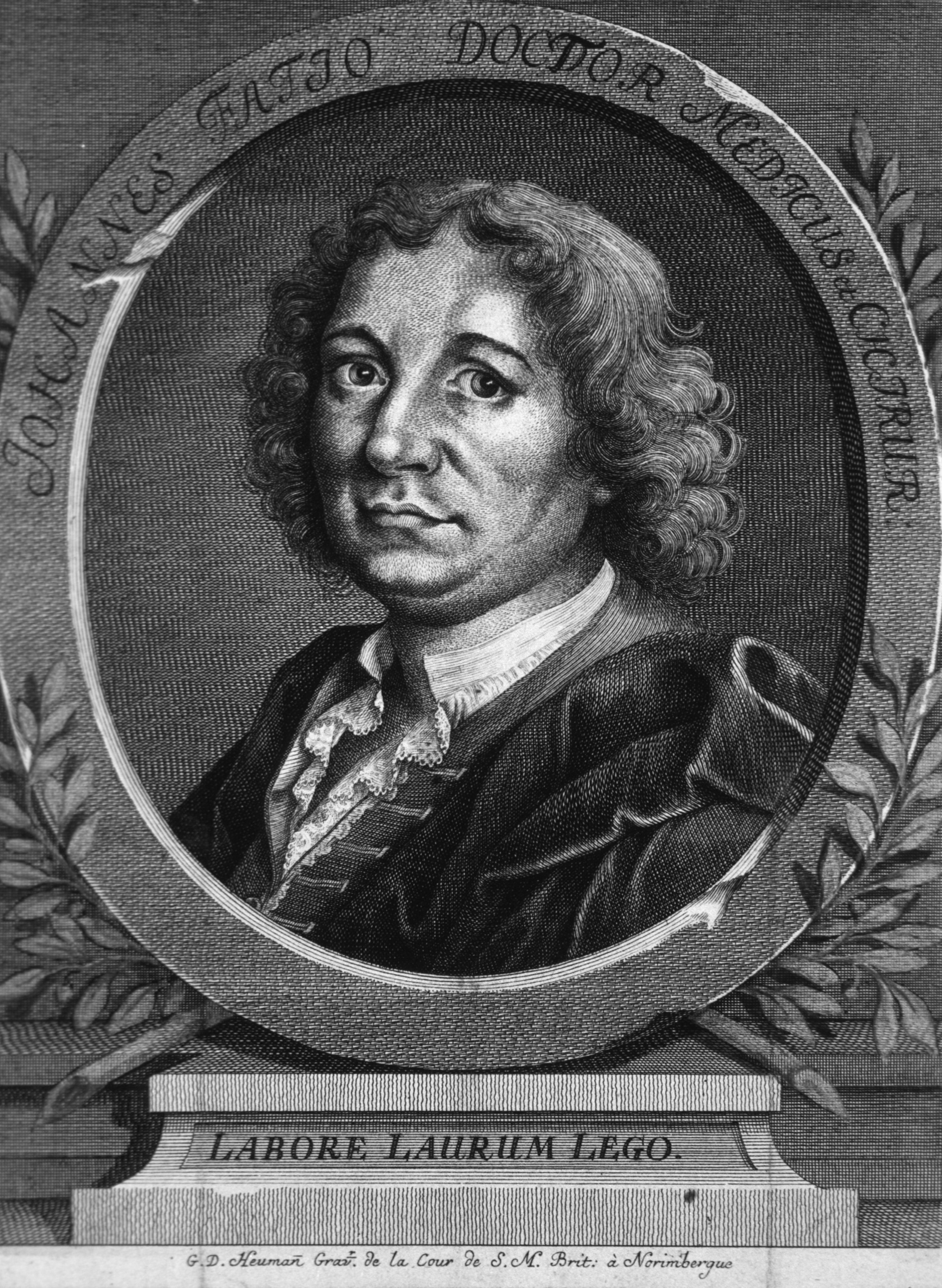
Johannes Fatio

Johannes Fatio (14 June 1649 – 28 September 1691) was a Swiss surgeon who worked in Basel. He performed the first successful separation of conjoined twins in 1689. He was publicly executed two years later for his role in the 1691 Basel revolution.

== Biography ==
Johannes Fatio was born on 14 June 1649 in Basel to Johann Anton Fatio, a merchant, and Christina Henricpetri. His father was of Italian Protestant descent and his mother came from a well known Basel family. Fatio enrolled in medicine at the University of Basel in 1662, aged 13, but never studied there. He completed an apprenticeship as a barber surgeon and was admitted to a barber surgeon's guild in 1672.

Fatio befriended Johann Heinrich Glaser, a professor of medicine, with whom he performed dissections and surgical demonstrations on cadavers at the University of Basel. After Glaser's death in 1675, Fatio completed a medical degree at the French University of Valence. Upon his return to Basel in 1678, his application for recognition as a qualified physician was denied because Basel did not recognise foreign degrees. Despite his unofficial standing, he established a successful surgical and obstetric practice in Basel over the next decade.

Fatio was an innovator in paediatric surgery, describing procedures for numerous birth defects including hypospadias, imperforate hymen, exomphalos and imperforate anus. His writings (published posthumously) also provides advice on resuscitating newborn babies with mouth-to-mouth resuscitation.

In 1690, Fatio joined a secret committee of discontented Basel citizens planning to rebel against the Basel parliament. When members of this revolutionary committee were appointed to parliament in 1691, Fatio was charged with rewriting the Basel constitution; his new constitution was extremely progressive. Counter-revolutionaries captured him on 21 September 1691, imprisoning and torturing him. He was publicly executed by beheading a week later on 28 September 1691.

== Separation of conjoined twins ==
Fatio performed the first successful separation of conjoined twins in 1689. The female twins, born to Clementia Meijerin on 23 November 1689 in a village near Basel, were first taken to physician Samuel Braun, who consulted Fatio. Fatio in turn consulted several other physicians including Nikolaus Eglinger, regarded as the official physician of the city of Basel, and Theodor Zwinger. Many doctors and high-profile members of Basel society were witness to the separation procedure. The separation of the twins, who were joined at the xiphoid process, was performed by ligature in three stages over nine days. After the separation, Fatio and Braun each cared for one twin, and each stump was said to have healed within ten days.

The first case report was published by physician Emanuel König in 1689. Multiple contemporaneous reports, including Zwinger's 1690 recount, credit Fatio as the surgeon who performed the separation. Fatio's own account was only published in 1752, 61 years after his death, as part of an obstetric handbook aimed at midwives titled Der Arzney Doctor, Helvetisch-Vernünftiche Wehe-Mutter. It was the only manuscript of Fatio's that was not burned by authorities at the time of his arrest and subsequent execution.
