= Moral (surname) =

Moral or del Moral are Spanish surnames, and Moral can also be a Turkish surname. Notable people with these surnames include:

== del Moral ==
- Abraham del Moral (born 2001), Spanish footballer
- Alberto del Moral (born 2000), Spanish footballer
- Alejandra del Moral (born 1983), Mexican politician
- Álvaro del Moral (born 1984), Spanish footballer
- Armando del Moral (1916–2009), Spanish-born American film journalist and publicist
- Carlos del Moral (born 1985), Spanish golfer
- Enrique del Moral (1905–1987), Mexican architect
- Francisco del Moral y Sánchez, governor of Spanish Florida in 1730s
- Joaquín del Moral Sánchez (born 1991), Spanish footballer
- Jorge del Moral (1900–1941), Mexican pianist and songwriter
- Manu del Moral (born 1984), Spanish footballer
- Manuel del Moral, Spanish politician and businessman in early 20th century
- Rosa del Moral (born 1936), Mexican fencer
- Vaness del Moral (born 1988), Filipino actress

== Moral (Spanish) ==
- Carmen Moral, Peruvian orchestra conductor
- Eva María Moral Pedrero (born 1982), Spanish paratriathlete
- Jose Zorrilla y Moral (1817–1893), Spanish poet and dramatist
- Juan José Moral (born 1951), Spanish cyclist
- Keith Jasper Moral Agovida (born 1990), Filipino basketball player
- Lucía Moral (born 2004), Spanish footballer
- Sandra Moral (born 1991), Spanish cyclist
- Toni Moral (born 1981), Spanish footballer
- Veronika Moral (born 1978), Spanish actress

== Moral (Turkish) ==
- Şaziye Moral (1903–1985), Turkish actress
- Şükran Moral (born 1962), Turkish video and installation artist

== As Spanish maternal family name ==
- Ana Marcos Moral (born 2000), Spanish footballer
- Antonio Gómez del Moral (1939–2021), Spanish cyclist
- Eduardo Brizuela del Moral (1944–2021), Argentine politician
- Fausto Saldaña del Moral (born 1967), Mexican politician
- Francisca Muñoz de León Moral (born 1993), Spanish sport shooter
- Isidro Juárez del Moral (born 1956), Spanish cyclist
- Jorge González Moral (born 1992), Spanish footballer
- José Gómez del Moral (1931–2021), Spanish cyclist
- M. Ángeles Serrano Moral, Spanish physicist

== Other ==
- Manuel Moral y Vega (1865–1913), Portuguese photographer and publisher
- Tony Lee Moral, British documentary film maker and writer

== See also ==
- Moral (disambiguation)
