= Morrall =

Morrall is a surname. Notable people with the surname include:

- Clare Morrall (born 1952), English novelist
- Earl Morrall (1934–2014), American football player
- George Morrall (1905–1955), English footballer
- June Morrall (1947–2010), American author
- Paul Morrall (born 1956), Renowned SCUBA diving pioneer in Technical Diving and photographer

== See also ==
- Morrill (disambiguation)
