= National Poultry Show =

Poultry show in Australia

The National Poultry Show (previously the Royal Canberra National Poultry Show) is the largest poultry show in the Southern Hemisphere, held quadrennially on the year of the Olympics and attracting exhibitors from across Australia.

It was hosted in Canberra until 2014, when it transferred to Sydney in 2016 following a dispute between the Royal National Capital Agricultural Society and the Royal Agricultural Society of New South Wales (RAS NSW) over the issue of borrowing cages from RAS NSW to use for the show in Canberra.

The show has in the past hosted 5,000 birds and 1,500 exhibitors, requiring up to 58 judges, some of whom have been international.

The 2020 poultry show was cancelled due to the COVID-19 pandemic in Australia.
