= Royal Agricultural Society of New South Wales =

- Formation: 5 July 1822
- Headquarters: Sydney Olympic Park
- Location: New South Wales, Australia
- President: John Bennett
- Key people: Governor of New South Wales, Patron; Brock Gilmour, Chief Executive
- Website: Royal Agricultural Society of NSW

The Royal Agricultural Society of New South Wales was founded on 5 July 1822, when a group of Sydney's leading citizens formed the Agricultural Society of NSW, and is "a not-for-profit organisation committed to supporting agricultural development and rural communities in Australia." The society has been responsible for holding the Sydney Royal Easter Show since 1823.

== History ==
Eleven officers were elected and the Society staged its first Show at Parramatta in 1823. However the Society lapsed in 1834 due to the pressure of drought and economic depression, but re-formed in 1857 under the name of the ‘Cumberland Agricultural Society.’ In 1859 the Society renamed itself the Agricultural Society of NSW. The Society's Shows, known at the time as Exhibitions, were held at Parramatta until 1866. At a meeting in February 1867, it was proposed to wind up the society, but an energetic proposal to revitalise the Society's fortunes was proposed by Society member Jules François de Sales Joubert (a nephew of French general Barthélemy Catherine Joubert):

The Agricultural Society of New South Wales, of which I was a member, held a meeting in February, 1867, when a very unsatisfactory balance-sheet, showing a debit balance, was produced. A resolution proposed to wind up and close that institution, was seconded, and would have been carried, had I not moved as an amendment, “That, instead of winding up this useful institution, it be re-constructed on a broader basis, a new council appointed, the seat of the society removed from Parramatta to Sydney, [Pg 80] and a show advertised in the course of six months from date, offering £800 in prize-money, and certificates for horses, cattle, sheep, poultry, pigs, wool, wine, farm and dairy produce, as well as implements, machinery, and manufactures.” The meeting was rather taken aback by the bold proposal, but there were amongst the members of the moribund society a few men such as Sir E. Deas Thomson, Sir W. MacArthur, John Oxley, John Wyndham, Howard Reid—now, I am sorry to say, all gone to join the great majority. These were the men to help any country or society out of difficulties. I had very little trouble, with the co-operation of such help-mates, in reconstructing the society on a new and firm basis. I gladly entered into my new honorary functions.

The Cleveland Paddock (now the Prince Alfred Park) was then a quagmire with a filthy drain running across it—a plague spot. This I at once selected for our new show-grounds. Draining, fencing in, and levelling, were easy works, soon accomplished. Having obtained the free use of the newly-erected Cleveland School, for fine art, manufacturers’, and horticultural exhibits, I built sheds, pens, &c., all over the paddock. Entries came in far in excess of our most sanguine expectations. The great day was approaching.

The 26th of August came, but with it one of those downpours which are only met with in tropical and semi-tropical countries. Our poor show certainly looked very dismal. The first day was something disastrous. On the night of the 26th, however, stars came out—mine must have been among them. On the 27th the gate [Pg 81] returns gave £l,100! This kept up well throughout the four days; but what crowned all our efforts was the high price realised for all the blood stock offered at auction.

It had been a bold enterprise, but the great success achieved amply rewarded us for our hard work.

As the old adage has it, “Nothing succeeds like success.” Before the end of the year our members’ roll had increased from 63 to 2000. The society was fairly on its legs, with a substantial credit balance, central offices, a library, laboratory, &c., &c., and last, though not least, a monthly journal. The gratitude of the stock-breeders, as well as that of the citizens of Sydney, for having brought about such a result, assumed a very tangible form. A service of silver plate and a heavy purse of sovereigns was presented to me at the annual general meeting, when I was asked to assume the management of the concern.

This is the origin of the exhibitions which for many years have been held annually in Sydney and other cities in Australia.

— from the autobiography of Jules Joubert

From the 1870s the Society faced financial difficulty and high rent and empty coffers forced the RAS to look for a new venue. The City Council offered 40 acres of unpromising, sandy scrub at Moore Park for an annual rent of £10. With the help of the NSW Government and public subscriptions the Society built a showground, which saw the show move from Prince Alfred Park and remain for the next 115 years. The Society had become the Royal Agricultural Society in 1891, when Queen Victoria gave her permission for the usage of "Royal". The Royal Agricultural Society Showground also became an important part of the history of rugby league in Australia, hosting some of the new code's first matches. The Royal Agricultural Society Shield was designated the newly formed NSWRFL Premiership's main trophy in 1908. During World War II the Sydney Royal Easter Show was cancelled when Moore Park was requisitioned for military use.

In 1938, the Royal Agricultural Society of New South Wales offered their showground as a Village for the 1938 British Empire Games.

By the late 1980s the Sydney Royal Easter Show had outgrown its Moore Park facilities. In 1994 the NSW Government approved its relocation to Sydney Olympic Park at Homebush. The first Show was held there in 1998.

== Personnel ==
- Sir John Robertson – President (1889–1890)
- Sydney Burdekin – President (1890–1891)
- Sir John See – President (1891–1907)
- Sir Francis Suttor – President (1907–1915)
- Samuel Hordern – President (1915–1941)
- Sir Archibald Howie – President (1941–1943)
- Sir Colin Sinclair – President (1943–1954)
- Sam Hordern – President (1954–1960)
- William Parry-Okeden – Executive Director for many years
- Lieutenant Colonel Roy Morell – Hon. Treasurer for 23 years
- Major-General Sandy Pearson – Executive Director (1976–1983)
- Winter Warden – committee member for many years
- Lord Livingstone Ramsay – Committee member for many years
- Major Bill Chaffey – Councillor (1951–65) and Vice-President (1966–79). Made Honorary Vice-President in 1979.
- Mr Prosper Nicholas Trebeck – Treasurer for an eleven year period

== See also ==
- Sydney Royal National Poultry Show
