= Faccio =

Faccio is a surname. Notable people with the surname include:

- Adele Faccio (1920–2007), Italian politician
- Franco Faccio (1840–1891), Italian opera composer and conductor
- Nicolas Faccio (1664–1753), Swiss mathematician; alternative name for Nicolas Fatio de Duillier
- Ricardo Faccio (1907–1970), Uruguayan-Italian football player

== See also ==
- Facio
- Fatio
