= Morell (name) =

Morell is both a surname and a given name. Notable people with the name include:

== Surname ==
- Abelardo Morell (born 1948), Boston-based photographer
- Alvin Morell Bentley (1918–1969), politician from the U.S. state of Michigan
- André Morell (1909–1978), British actor
- Barry Morell (1927–2003), American operatic tenor
- Curdin Morell (born 1963), Swiss bobsledder
- George Morell (Michigan jurist) (1786–1845), American jurist
- George W. Morell (1815–1883), civil engineer, lawyer, farmer, and a Union general in the American Civil War
- Gladys Morrell (1888–1969), Bermudian suffragette leader
- John Daniel Morell (1816–1891), British educationalist
- José Abreu Morell (1864–1889), Cuban painter
- Juliana Morell (1594–1653), Spanish Dominican nun
- Marty Morell (born 1944), drummer, percussionist, vibraphonist and producer
- Mayo Fuster Morell (born 1975), Spanish social researcher
- Michael Morell (born 1958), former Deputy Director of the Central Intelligence Agency
- Monica Morell (1953–2008), Swiss singer
- Peter Andreas Amundsen Morell (1868–1948), Norwegian Minister of Social Affairs
- Theodor Morell (1886–1948), Adolf Hitler's personal physician
- Raquel Morell (born 1959), Mexican actress
- Roy Morell (1889–1961), Australian wool broker, grazier and stockbroker
- Thomas Morell (1703–1784), English librettist, classical scholar and Fellow of the Royal Society

== Given name ==
- Alvin Morell Bentley (1918–1969), American diplomat
- Morell Mackenzie (1837–1892), British physician

== Fictional characters ==
- Alexis Colby (birth surname "Morell") is a fictional character of soap opera Dynasty. Was played by Joan Collins from 1981 to 1991. Later in the 2017 reboot was played firstly by Nicollette Sheridan (2018–2019), then for a couple of episodes by Amy Sutherland (2019) and Elizabeth Gillies (2019) and eventually the role was assigned to Elaine Hendrix (2019–2022).
  - Her daughter, Fallon Carrington (played by Elizabeth Gillies), used the surname "Morell" on some occasions during the reboot of the show.
- Rowanne Morell, a fictional police officer on the television police procedural The Bill

== See also ==
- Morel (surname)
