= Facio =

Facio is a surname. Notable people with the surname include:

- Alda Facio (born 1948), Costa Rican jurist, writer, and teacher
- Bartolomeo Facio, Italian historian, writer, and humanist
- Giannina Facio (born 1955), Costa Rican actress and producer
- Lorena Clare Facio (1943–2026), First Lady of Costa Rica
- Sara Facio (1932–2024), Argentine photographer

== See also ==
- Faccio
- Fatio
