= Switzerland, Florida =

Community in Florida, United States

Coordinates: 30°04′34″N 81°38′50″W

Switzerland
- Unincorporated community
- Etymology: Named for the New Switzerland Plantation of Francis Philip Fatio
- Location in Florida
- Country: United States
- State: Florida
- County: St. Johns County
- Named from: Late 18th century and early 19th century

Government
  - Type: Unincorporated
- Time zone: UTC-5 (Eastern Time)
  - Summer (DST): UTC-4 (EDT)
- ZIP Code: 32259
- Adjacent to Fruit Cove

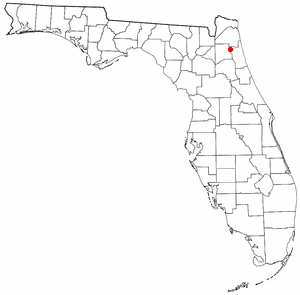
Location of Switzerland, Florida

Switzerland is an unincorporated community in northwest St. Johns County, Florida, United States, adjacent to Fruit Cove.

Along with Fruit Cove, the community is associated to the zip code 32259. Julington Creek or Julington Creek Plantation is part of Fruit Cove. For newer residents, the area of Fruit Cove and Switzerland is called Saint Johns. Switzerland is along the eastern bank of the St. Johns River, across from Green Cove Springs and Middleburg in Clay County, and is south of Jacksonville. The name derives from the late 18th century and early 19th century New Switzerland Plantation of Francis Philip Fatio, which was established between 1771, when Fatio arrived in Florida, and 1774, when Fatio moved from the New Castle Plantation to New Switzerland.

In the 1970s and 1980s, the Switzerland area had one K-12 school named Julington Creek Elementary. In 1981, Allen D Nease Jr-Sr High School was opened and three feeder schools, Julington Creek Elementary, Mill Creek Elementary and Ponte Vedra Elementary 7-12th graders moved to Nease Jr-Sr High School. There are many schools in the Switzerland area. The main elementary schools are Hickory Creek Elementary and Cunningham Creek Elementary. The middle school is Switzerland Point Middle School, and the high school is Bartram Trail High School.
