= Moral (disambiguation) =

A moral is a message that is conveyed or a lesson to be learned from a story or event.

Moral or morals may also refer to:

- Morality, systems that judge things as proper or improper
- Moral Township, Shelby County, Indiana
- Morals (film), a 1921 film
- Moral (1928 film), a German film
- Moral (1982 film), a Filipino film
- Moral (surname)

== See also ==
- Morale, the capacity of a group's members to maintain belief in the face of opposition or hardship
- Morality (disambiguation)
