= Ranz des Vaches =

Swiss Alpine song

A Ranz des Vaches (/ˈrɒ̃(s)deɪˌvɑːʃ/, French: [ʁɑ̃ de vaʃ]) or Kuhreihen (German: [ˈkuːˌʁaɪən]) is a type of work song traditionally played on the horn by the Swiss Alpine herdsmen as they called their cattle from the pastures for milking or the descent from alpine pastures. The Kuhreihen is linked to the Swiss nostalgia and Homesickness (also known as mal du Suisse "Swiss illness" or Schweizerheimweh "Swiss homesickness").

== In Swiss nostalgia ==
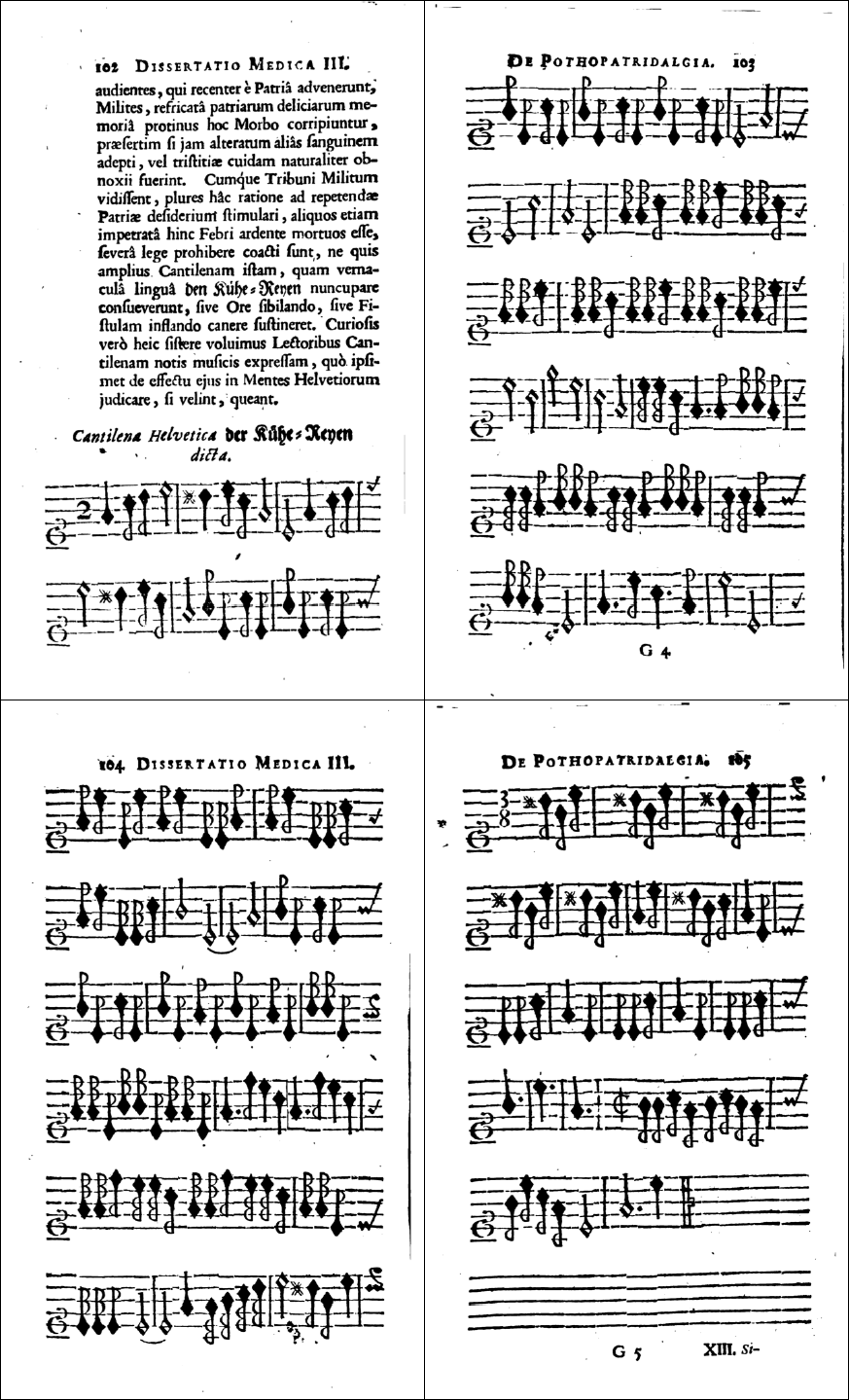
In 1710, physician Theodor Zwinger III noted the melody of Kuhreihen, because it caused a state of prostration in Swiss mercenaries.

Ranz des Vaches

The Reverend James Wood, writing in The Nuttall Encyclopaedia in 1907, said that such a tune "when played in foreign lands, produces on a Swiss an almost irrepressible yearning for home", repeating 18th century accounts the mal du pays or nostalgia diagnosed in Swiss mercenaries.

Ranz des vaches is mentioned in a 1710 medical text by a famous doctor from Basel, Theodor Zwinger III, who calls it by its German name Kuhreihen and in Latin Cantilena helvetica. Zwinger was interested in the phenomenon of nostalgia, which at the time seemed to be specific to Swiss mercenaries stationed abroad, who would fall into a state of prostration when they heard this song.

The 1767 Dictionnaire de Musique by Jean-Jacques Rousseau claims that Swiss mercenaries were threatened with death to prevent them from singing this song, because it led them to desertion, illness or death :

J’ai ajouté dans la même Planche le célèbre Rans-des-Vaches, cet Air si chéri des Suisses qu’il fut défendu sous peine de mort de le jouer dans leurs Troupes, parce qu’il faisoit fondre en larmes, déserter ou mourir ceux qui l’entendoient, tant il excitoit en eux l’ardent desir de revoir leur pays.

The Romantic connection of nostalgia, the Kuhreihen and the Swiss Alps was a significant factor in the enthusiasm for Switzerland, the development of early tourism in Switzerland and Alpinism that took hold of the European cultural elite in the 19th century.

== Reception ==
The Kuhreihen were romanticized in the wake of the Unspunnenfest of 1805 in a collection edited by G. J Kühn and J. R. Wyss. The fourth edition of 1826 gave scores for piano and was luxuriously illustrated, its intended market the educated early tourists to Switzerland. The collection also influenced the Swiss yodel that was emerging at the time. It became somewhat of a topos in Romantic literature, and figures in the poem Der Schweizer by Achim von Arnim (1805) and in Clemens Brentano's Des Knaben Wunderhorn (1809) as well as in the opera Le Chalet by Adolphe Charles Adam (1834) which was performed for Queen Victoria under the title The Swiss Cottage.

Perhaps the most famous of the Ranz des Vaches is the cor anglais and flute solo in the third section of the overture to Gioachino Rossini's opera William Tell, which has been used hundreds of times in many derivative works since its 1829 premiere, frequently to symbolize a pastoral setting. Another famous example is the oboe and cor anglais theme of the third movement of Hector Berlioz's Symphonie fantastique.

Henry David Thoreau compared the song of the wood thrush to a ranz des vaches: "So there is something in the music of the cow bell, something sweeter and more nutritious, than in the milk which the farmers drink. This thrush’s song is a ranz des vaches to me. I long for wildness, a nature which I cannot put my foot through, woods where the wood thrush forever sings, where the hours are early morning ones, and there is dew on the grass, and the day is forever unproved, where I might have a fertile unknown for a soil about me." In his Walden chapter "The Bean Field," Thoreau writes of the beans he plants near his home: "They were beans cheerfully returning to their wild and primitive state that I cultivated, and my hoe played the Ranz des Vaches for them."

== See also ==
- Alphorn
- Culture of Switzerland
- Shepherd
- Work song
- Yodel
- Kulning
