= University of York Library =

University library in York, England

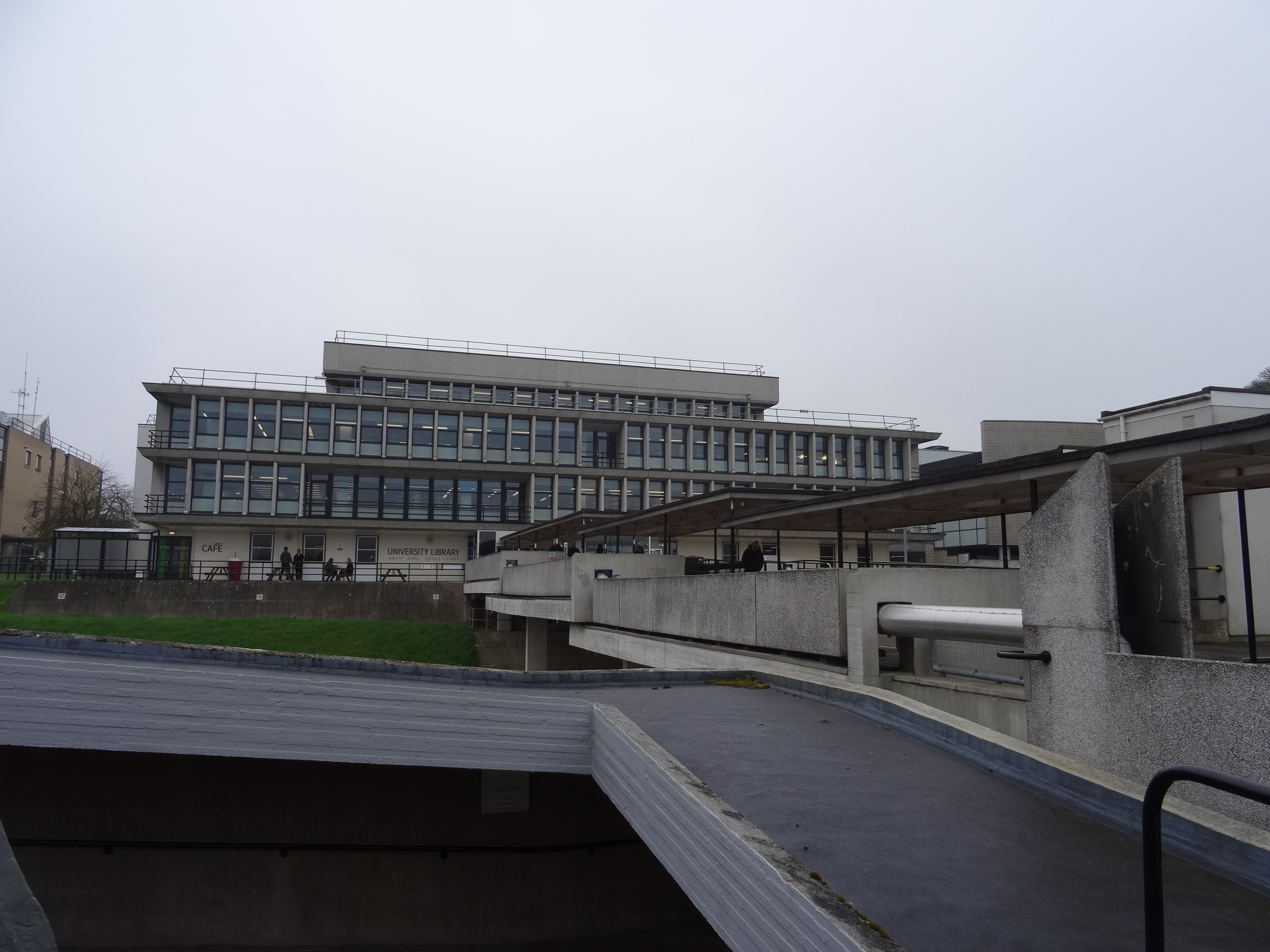
- JB Morrell Library
- 53°56′57″N 1°03′13″W
- Location: University Road, Heslington, York, United Kingdom
- Type: Academic library
- Established: 1965

Other information
- Website: https://www.york.ac.uk/library/

The University of York Library is the library service for students and staff at the University of York, England.

The current library physical premises comprise a series of three linked buildings to the north side of the University of York Heslington West campus. The buildings are also home to the Borthwick Institute for Archives.

Since the library's inception its collections have grown to encompass more than a million items, including books, journals, music scores, theses and dissertations, and digital media.

The Library is part of Library, Archives and Learning Services, which employs 168 staff, and which is in turn part of Student and Academic Services at the University of York.

== History ==
The University of York opened in 1963, with the main campus library opening in 1965. The building was designed by architects Robert Matthew, Johnson-Marshall and Partners, and build by Shepherd Construction. The original library building was named after John Bowes Morrell, a keen supporter for the establishment of a university in York, and a former Lord Mayor of the city. A source from the 1990s calls the library the Bowes Morrell Library.

Forty years on, the Raymond Burton Library was built alongside the Morrell in 2003. This building was designed by Leach Rhodes Walker architects as a home for a Humanities Research library and was designed to make a strong visual statement from its elevated position on the campus. The library is named after the Leeds business man and philanthropist Raymond Montague Burton who was a longtime supporter of the library.

A major £20 million refurbishment was completed in 2012, expanding the footprint of the library to include an additional building adjacent to the Morrell. This space was named after the first University Librarian appointed: Harry Fairhurst. Novelist and alumnus Anthony Horowitz officially reopened the newly refurbished and expanded University library in February 2012.

In 2021 students and the library's own Twitter account posted photographs of robins which had entered the library due to more windows being open during the COVID-19 pandemic, the library joked that they got their own library card.

In 2022 the library decided to permanently remove all fines for late return of books, in response the success of a similar measure introduced on a permanent basis during the COVID-19 pandemic.

== Library buildings ==
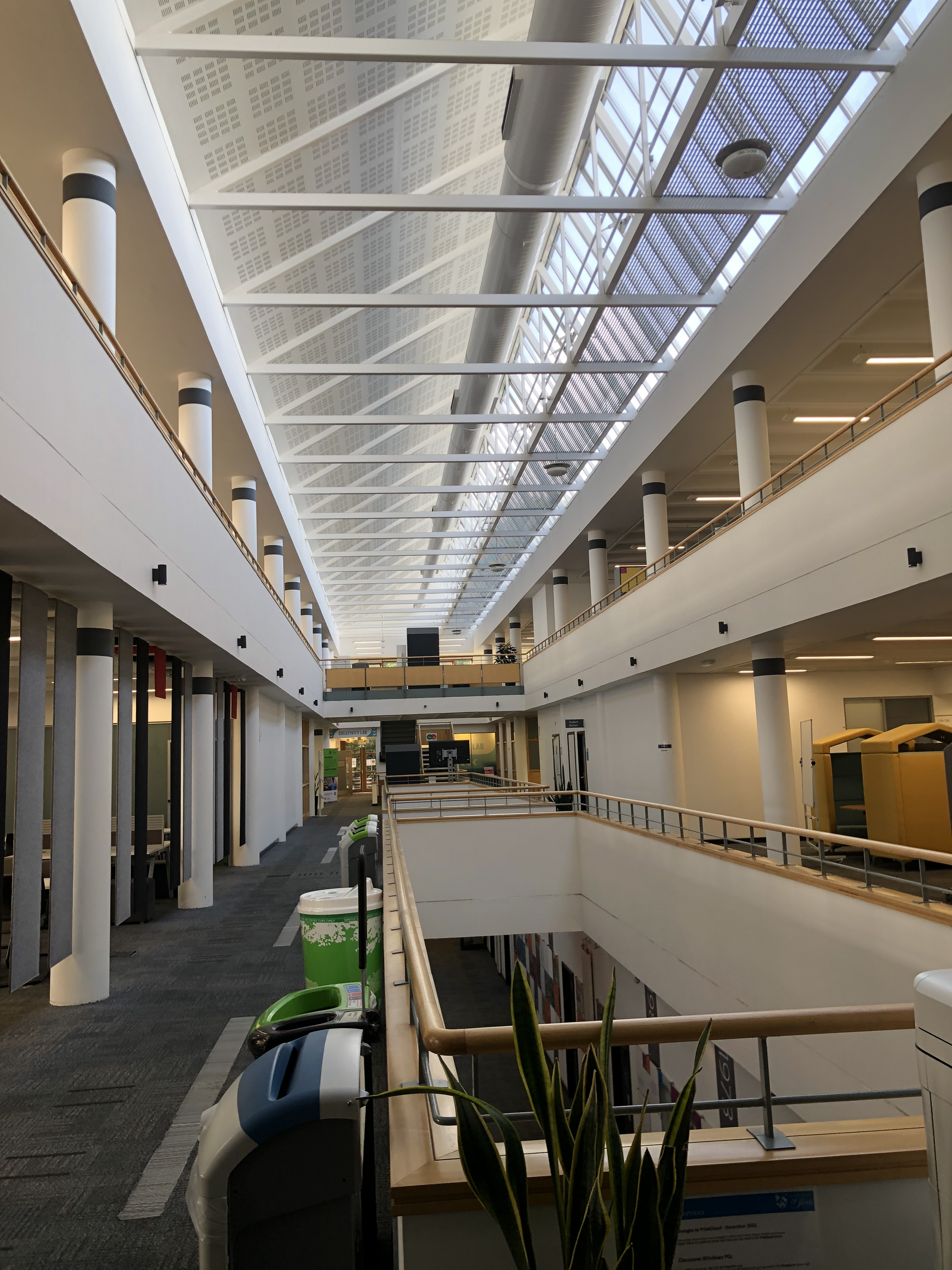
Harry Fairhurst Building atrium

J.B. Morrell Library: Houses collections to support learning, teaching and research across all subject areas. Named after John Bowes Morrell, an instigator in the formation of York University.

Harry Fairhurst Building: Provides a mix of study spaces across three floors. Named after the university's first librarian, Harry Fairhurst.

Raymond Burton Library: Houses the Humanities Research reference collection and the Borthwick Institute for Archives. Named after a philanthropist supporter of the university.

Library@Piazza: A study space located in the Piazza Learning Centre on Campus East. Contains no physical resources.

== Collections ==
The library provides collections to support the teaching, learning and research goals of the university, and to reflect the breadth of the university's user communities. The special collections include history of art, music, theological libraries, stained glass and Yorkshire. The Morell library houses the majority of the library's collection of over 1 million print books and 21,000 journals.

=== Yorsearch ===
Students also have access to online collections which include over 4.4 million books and 43 million peer-reviewed journals. The online catalogue joins together all of the libraries within the university system as well as the collections of the York Minster Library and E-resource collections.

== Associated libraries ==
The library of the National Railway Museum is called The Search Engine.

The York Minster Library is located in Deans Park to the north of York Minster.

== Partnerships ==
The library is a member of several organizations including:

- Research Libraries UK
- SCONUL
