= Theodor Zwinger III =

Swiss physician

Theodor Zwinger III (26 August 1658 – 22 April 1724) was a Swiss physician.

== Life ==
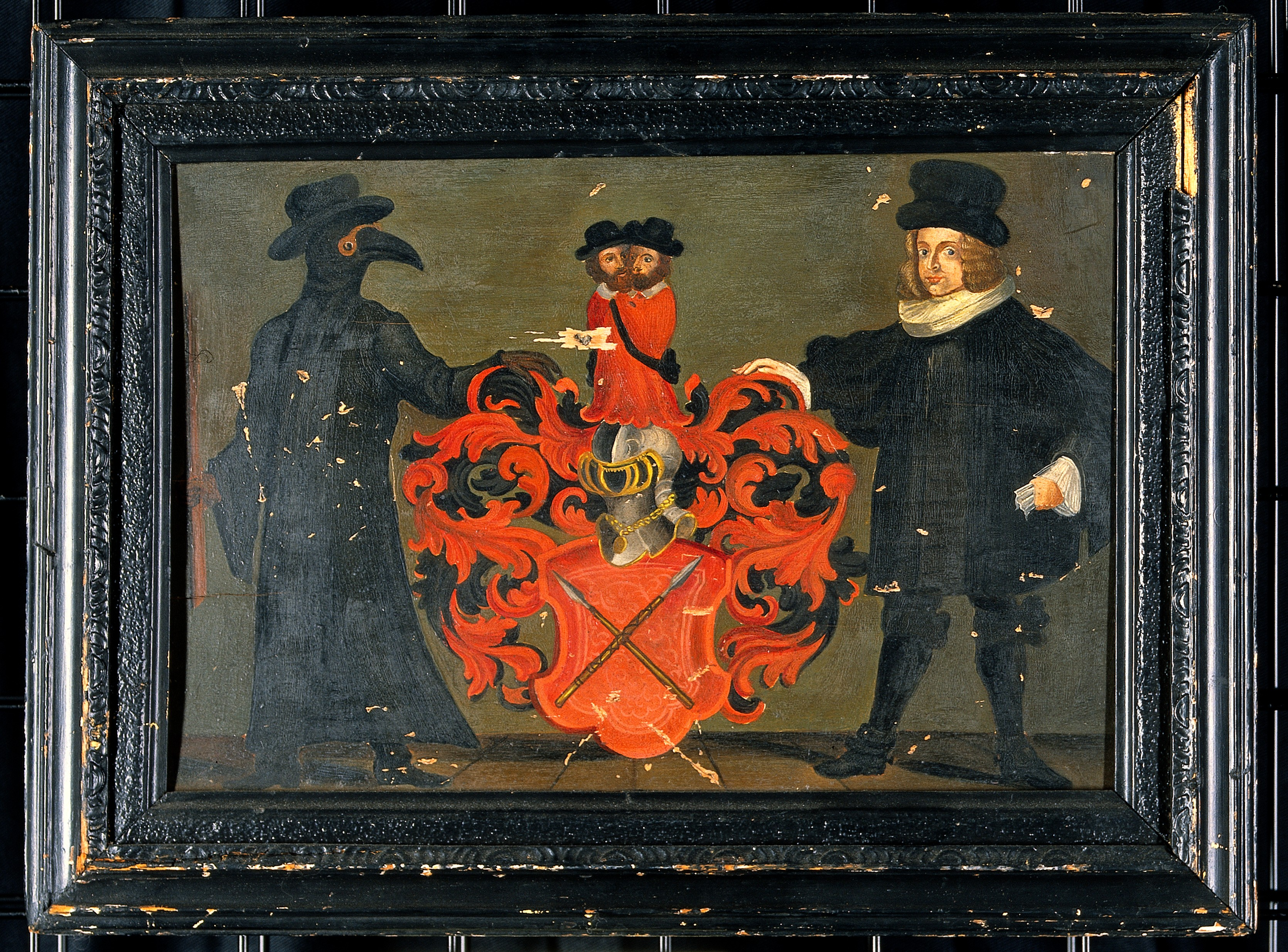
Coat of arms of Theodor Zwinger III. (Wellcome Collection).

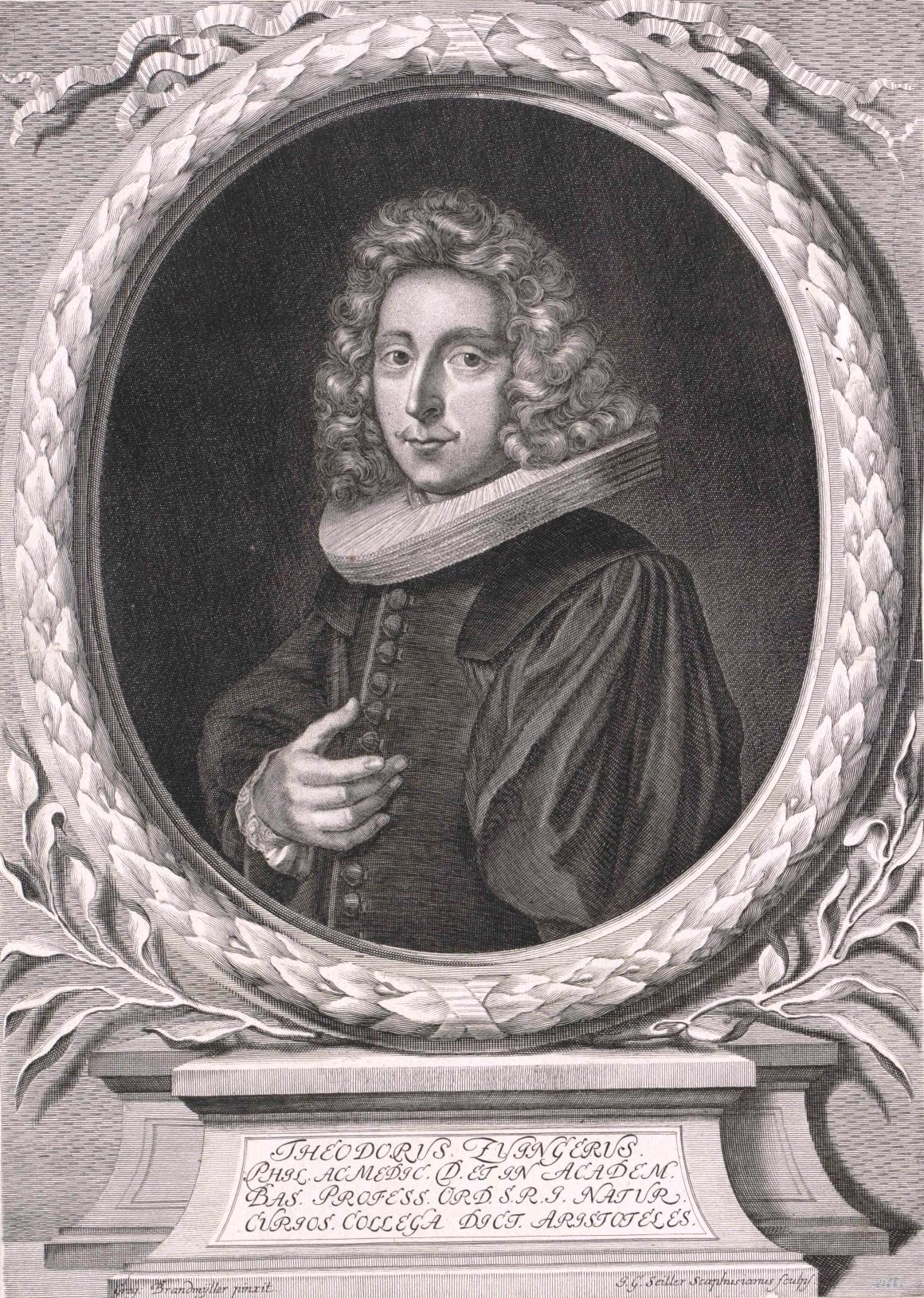
Theodor Zwinger III, engraving by Johann Georg Seiller after Gregor Brandmüller.

Theodor Zwinger came from an important Basel family of scholars. His father was the Basel theology professor Johannes Zwinger. He studied in Basel from 1675 and in 1680 was made a medical doctor with the dissertation De paedotrophia.

He then spent two years in France, including in Paris and Strasbourg. After his return to Basel, he pursued a career as a university lecturer at the University of Basel. First he took over the professorship of rhetoric in 1684, three years, later the chair of physics, in 1703, that of anatomy and botany, and in 1711 the chair of theoretical and practical medicine which he retained until his death. He also worked as Stadtarzt (town doctor), was dean several times and in 1711/1712 rector.

In 1685, Zwinger was elected a member of the German National Academy of Sciences Leopoldina. In 1706 he became a member of the Prussian Academy of Sciences.

In 1700, Zwinger was offered the first chair of medicine at Leiden University. The Landgrave of Hesse-Cassel and the King of Prussia sought to secure him by offers; but nothing could persuade him to leave his native town. Appointed physician and Aulic Counciller to the Duke of Württemberg and the Marquis of Baden-Durlach, he received the same titles from several princes and from various towns in Germany.

In December 1703, he moved from the chair of physics to that of anatomy and botany. In winter he presided over dissections in the amphitheater, and in summer, followed by his pupils, he traveled through the mountains of Switzerland to collect new plants, with which he enriched the garden of the academy.

The city of Freiburg im Breisgau, afflicted with an epidemic in 1710, demanded the care of Zwinger. He spent the day visiting the sick and part of the night writing up his observations.

In 1710, Theodor Zwinger III noted the melody of Kuhreihen, because it caused a state of prostration in Swiss mercenaries. He called this prostration pothopatridalgia

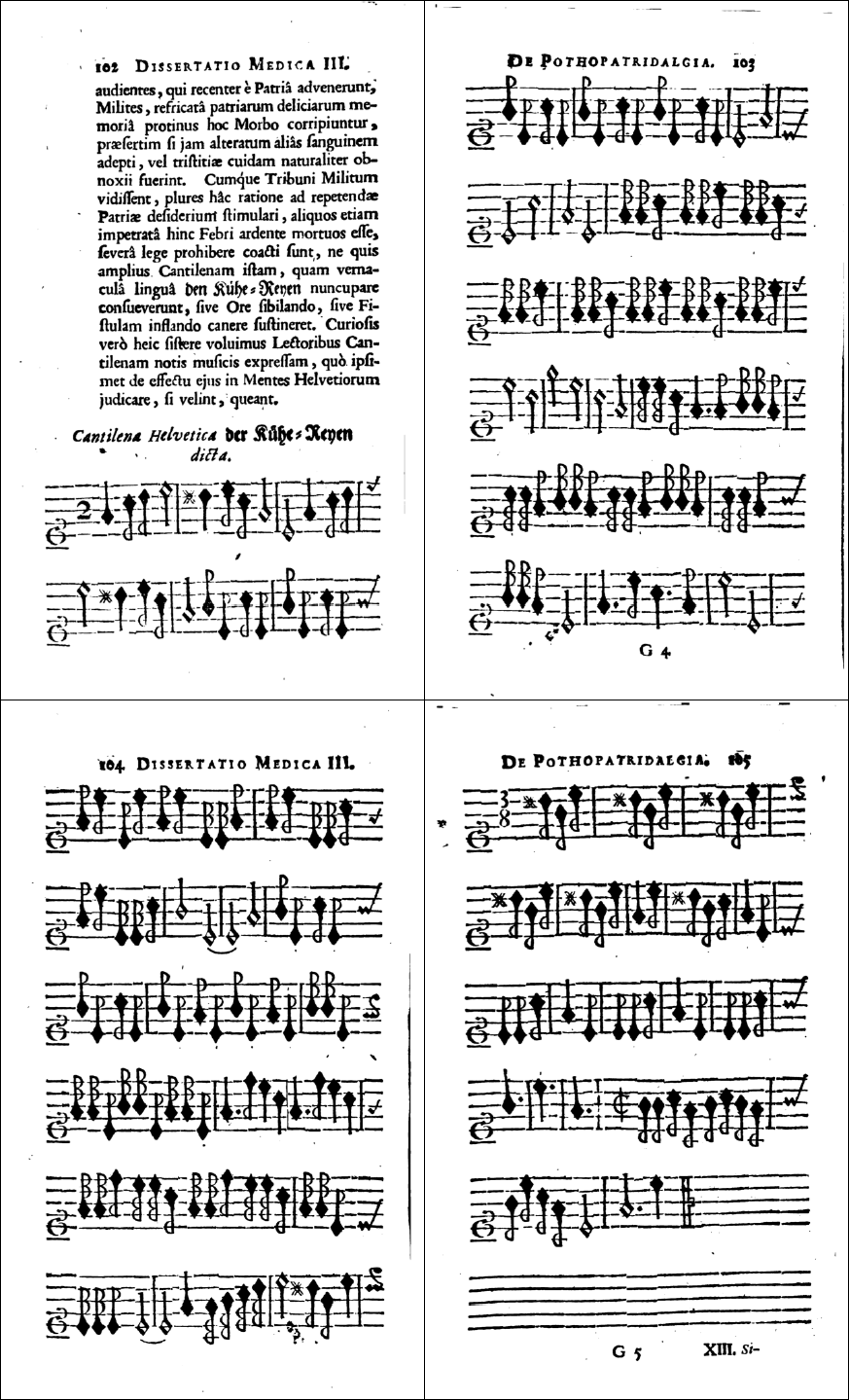
In 1710, Theodor Zwinger III noted the melody of Kuhreihen, because it caused a state of prostration in Swiss mercenaries. He called this prostration Pothopatridalgia

He made valuable contributions to pediatrics and physics classes in Basel. He also maintained an extensive correspondence, including with Johann Jakob Scheuchzer.

The theologian Johann Rudolf Zwinger was a brother of Zwinger. One son was the anatomist Johann Rudolph Zwinger. His nephew Johann Rudolf Mieg was also one of his students.
