= Emanuel König =

Swiss physician & naturalist (1658–1731)

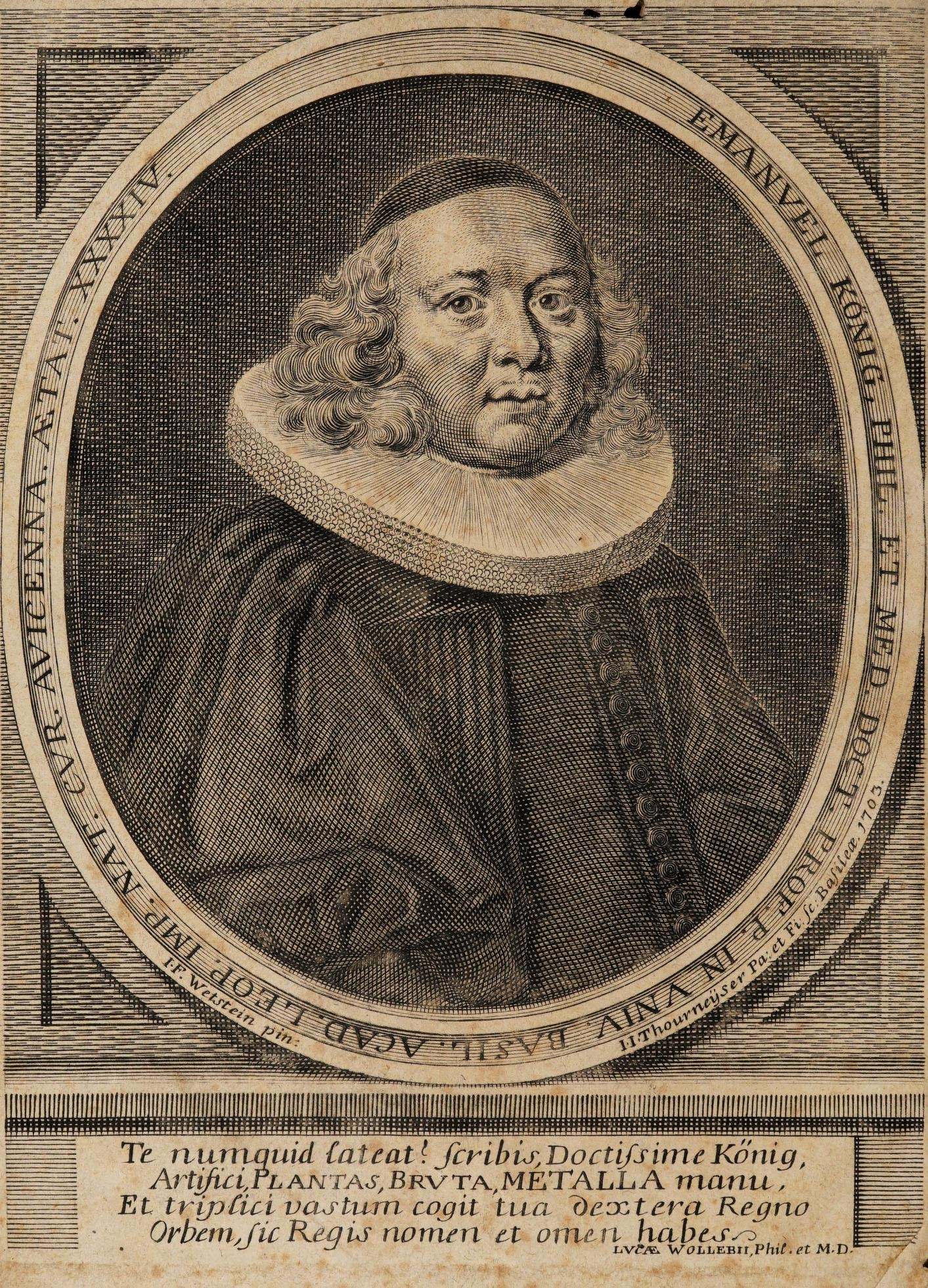

Emanuel König Latinized as Emanuelis König (1 November 1658 – 30 July 1731) was a Swiss physician and naturalist. He became a professor of medicine at the University of Basel and is best known for his three books Regnum animale (1682), Regnum minerals (1686), and Regnum vegetabile (1688). He adopted a Cartesian principle, explaining animal physiology along mechanistic foundations.

König was born in Basel where his father was a bookseller. He studied at the University of Basel, receiving a medical degree in 1682. He became a member of the Leopoldina Academy through the efforts of George Wolfgang Wedel of Jena and published many papers. He travelled in Italy and France and returned to become a professor of Greek at Basel in 1695 and a professor of medicine in 1711. He began to examine older texts and compiled his own works on the use of plants, animals and minerals in medical therapy. He was critical of existing theories and countered the contemporary belief that plants got their nourishment from water alone by noting that salt and components from air were also involved. His three books compiled medical views of the plant, animal and mineral kingdoms and their role in treatments. He claimed the efficacy of bones and ivory as cures as also drinking one's own urine.
