= Morality (disambiguation) =

Morality is the differentiation between right and wrong.

Morality may also refer to:

- Morality (Buddhism)
- Morality (novella)
- Morality (The Armando Iannucci Shows)
