= Francis Philip Fatio =

Swiss-born planter in East Florida (1724–1811)

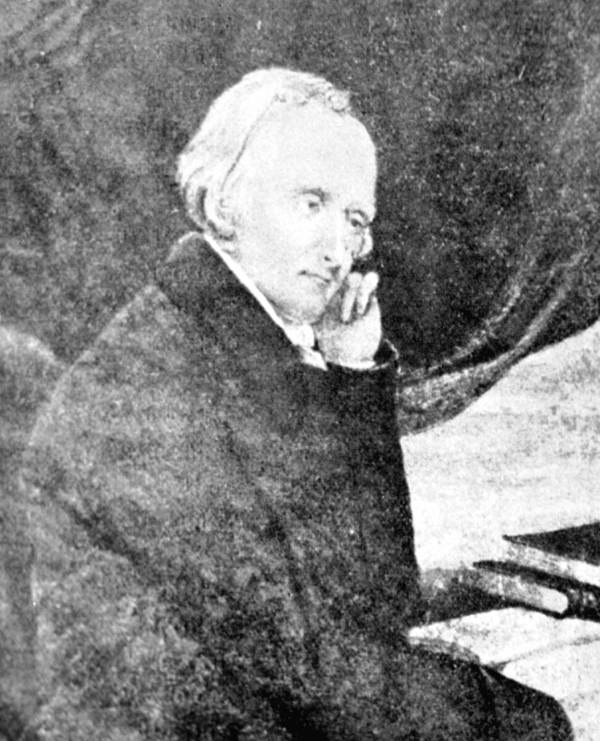
- Portrait in the State Library and Archives of Florida
- Born: Francis Philip Fatio; 1724; Vevey, Switzerland
- Died: 1811 (aged 86–87); Spanish East Florida
- Other name: Francisco Phelipe Fatio
- Occupations: soldier, merchant, plantation owner
- Known for: planter, relationship with government of Spanish East Florida

Francis Philip Fatio (known in Spanish as Francisco Phelipe Fatio; 1724–1811), born in Switzerland, was a mercenary for France, a viscount in the Kingdom of Sardinia, a merchant in London, and a prominent planter in East Florida during both the British period and the second Spanish period.

== Early life and career ==
Francis Philip Fatio was born in 1724 in Vevey, Switzerland. He joined the Swiss Guards, and fought for France in the War of the Austrian Succession. He later moved to the Kingdom of Sardinia, his wife's native land, where he was made a viscount. In 1759, Fatio joined his brother in commerce in London.

== British period in East Florida ==
In 1769, Francis Fatio invested with two partners, Thomas Dunnage and John Francis Rivas, in plantations in East Florida. In 1771, Francis Fatio moved with his family to East Florida to become the managing partner of New Castle Plantation, which specialized in producing indigo. New Castle Plantation was located on the St. Johns River in what is now the Arlington neighborhood of Jacksonville.

In 1774, Fatio moved to another plantation upriver (south) of New Castle, named New Switzerland in honor of Fatio's birthplace. (The site is now the community of Switzerland.) The New Switzerland Plantation consisted of 10,000 acres (4,000 ha). Fatio built a two-story house, 30 by 40 feet (9.1 by 12.2 m), at a cost of £800. The plantation also included a house for the overseers, a carriage house, a warehouse, workshops, and a hospital. Among his slaves was Louis Pacheco, who later served as an interpreter among the Black Seminoles. Francis Fatio prospered in British East Florida. During the American Revolution he served as a staff officer with the British Army, stationed in Charleston, South Carolina.

== Second Spanish period in East Florida ==
At the end of the American Revolutionary War, when Florida was returned to Spain by Britain in 1784, Francis Fatio decided to stay with his plantation and become a subject of Spain. He bought out his partners and became sole owner of New Switzerland. Francis Philip Fatio now became Francisco Phelipe Fatio, and his plantation became Nueva Suiza.

Francisco Fatio immediately became an important person in Spanish East Florida. As the newly returned Spanish government in Florida was short of cash, Fatio supplied rations and clothing for the Spanish troops stationed there. Fatio then used the government's dependence on his supplies to engage in trade with the United States that exceeded the terms of the license issued to him by the Spanish government. Fatio had disputes with Spanish officials over the proper measurement of corn he sold to the government, his lack of cooperation with government inquiries, and his desire to participate in the trade with Native Americans, which was an official monopoly of Panton, Leslie & Company.

During the transition period of the transfer of East Florida from Britain to Spain, incoming Spanish Governor Vicente Manuel de Zéspedes appointed Francisco Fatio and John Leslie (of Panton, Leslie & Company) to judge disputes between British subjects who were preparing to leave the colony. Many of the disputes involved slaves, which the departing British could take with them if they could retain custody of them. Fatio, along with the few other British subjects who were remaining in Florida under the Spanish, bought fixed property cheaply from the departing settlers, often with a promise to forward the proceeds of future sales when prices had improved. There is, however, little evidence of that happening.

The Nueva Suiza landing on the St. Johns River was a way point for the movement of troops, supplies and messages between St. Augustine and Spanish outposts on the St. Johns River. Spanish officers went to Nueva Suiza to recuperate from illnesses acquired at their posts. Merchant ships could sail up the St. Johns to Nueva Suiza as well, carrying away products, including timber, from the plantation.

Nueva Suiza produced maize, citrus fruit and cotton for sale. The plantation also had cattle, hogs and sheep (kept for the wool). The plantation was worked by 86 slaves (and four free blacks). Nueva Suiza was at the frontier of settlement in Spanish East Florida. In 1801, Native Americans raided the plantation, carrying away 38 slaves. Sixteen of the slaves were recovered the next year.

== Death and family ==
Francisco Phelipe Fatio died in July 1811. The parish priest in St. Augustine would not allow Fatio to be buried in the city cemetery, as he had never converted to Catholicism. He was buried at Nueva Suiza. The next year the Fatio family was driven from Nueva Suiza by the Patriot Army, a force of American volunteers who made a filibustering attempt to seize East Florida.

Francis Philip Fatio was married to Maria Magdalena Crespell. Francis and Maria had three children and 24 grandchildren. Their son Lewis Fatio served as the Spanish consul in New Orleans. Lewis's daughter Louisa operated a boarding house in the historic Ximenez-Fatio House in St. Augustine. Francis Philip and Maria Fatio's daughter Sophia married George Fleming. George and Sophia's grandson, Francis Phillip Fleming, was the 15th Governor of Florida.

== Sources ==
- Parker, Susan R. (1988). Fretwell, Jacqueline K.; Parker, Susan R. (eds.). ""I am neither your subject nor your subordinate"". The St. Augustine Journal of History (Clash Between Cultures). St. Augustine, Florida: The St. Augustine Historical Society: 43–60. ISSN 0014-0376.
