= Ximenez-Fatio House =

Historic house in Florida, United States

- U.S. National Register of Historic Places
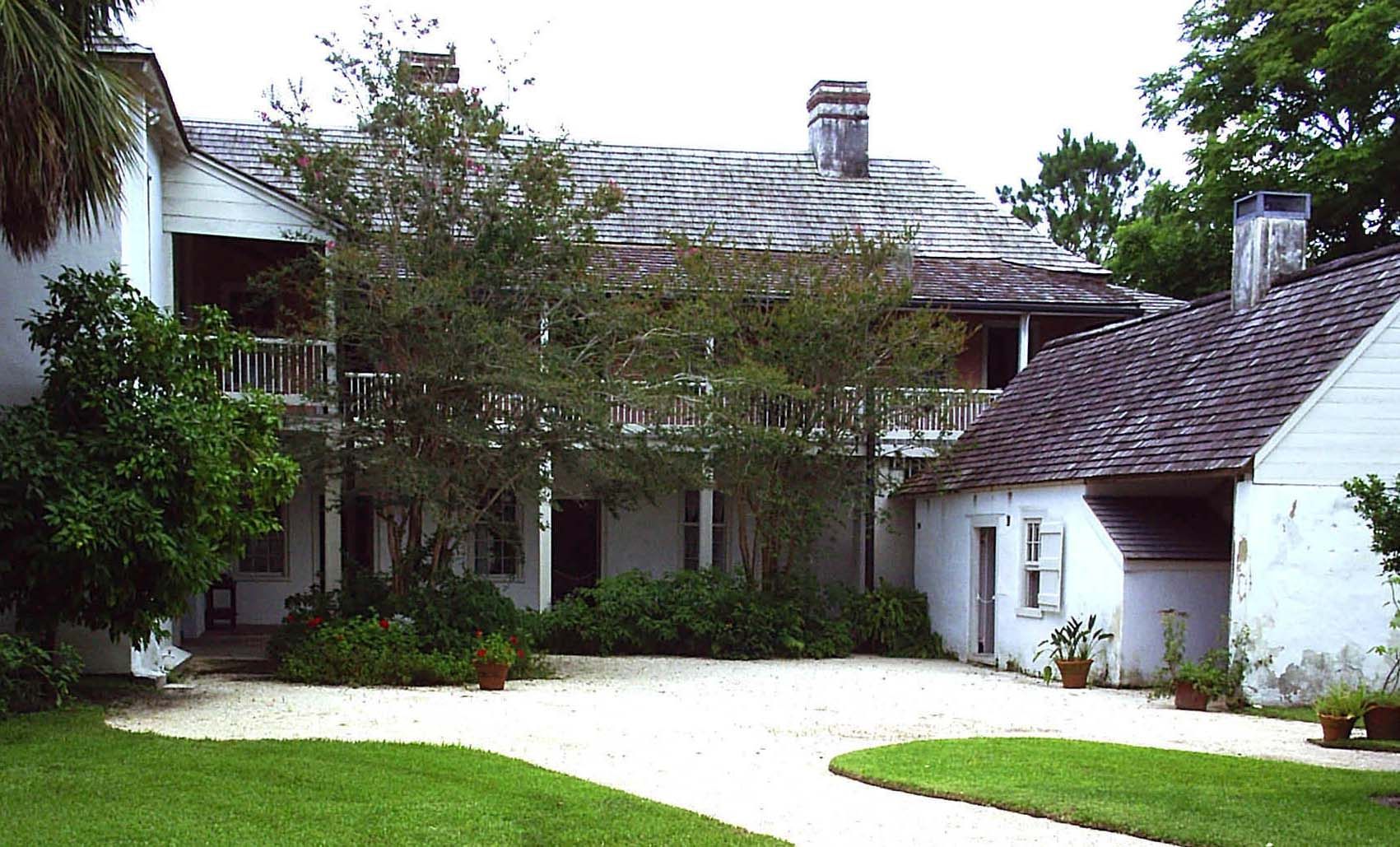

- Location within Florida Location within the United States
- Interactive map showing the location of Ximena-Fatio House
- Location: St. Augustine, Florida
- Coordinates: 29.89102°N 81.31152°W
- Built: 1797-1802
- NRHP reference No.: 73002135
- Added to NRHP: July 25, 1973

Ximenez-Fatio House Museum is one of the best-preserved and most authentic Second Spanish Period (1783-1821) residential buildings in St. Augustine, Florida. In 1973, it was added to the National Register of Historic Places. It was designated a Florida Heritage Landmark in 2012.

The museum complex sits just south of the city's central Plaza de la Constitución at 20 Aviles Street (formerly Hospital Street), the oldest archaeologically documented street in the United States. It is located at the center of Old Town, the city's oldest continuously occupied community.

Since 1939, the property has been privately owned and managed by The National Society of The Colonial Dames of America in The State of Florida (NSCDA-FL). Through their efforts, it was restored and interpreted to reflect its function as a fashionable boarding house during Florida's first tourist boom, which began after 1821.

The property is a historic house museum, furnished and presented to tell stories of the visitors who lodged there, the women who owned and managed it, and how people lived during Florida's territorial period.

== Historical background and context ==
Louisa Fatio purchased the boarding house from Sarah Petty Anderson.

=== Andres Ximenez ===
The two-story main house was built by Andres Ximenez (an alternate spelling of Jimenez), a merchant of Spanish birth who married Juana Pellicer, daughter of Francisco Pellicer, a leader of the Minorcan community in St. Augustine. The property's modern name references Ximenez as well as the last historic owner of record: Louisa Fatio (FAY-she-oh), who ran the boarding house as Miss Fatio's. Louisa purchased the house in 1855, becoming the last of three successive women owners during its years as a boarding house. Their success contributes to the historical significance of the property, because this was a time when few American women owned property in their own names or managed a respectable business.

The house's adaptability to commercial activities is due in part to its size and central location near the plaza and the bayfront. Andres Ximenez built the structure to accommodate his family upstairs and support them through undertakings housed downstairs. His wife Juana probably assisted him in running a general store, tavern, billiard table and lottery. The Ximenez family did not occupy the house for long. By 1806, both parents and two of their five minor children had died. For a number of years following, Juana's father managed the property on his grandchildren's behalf.

The Adams-Onis Treaty of 1819, in which Spain settled a border dispute and ceded Florida to the United States, brought big changes to St. Augustine. The only city on the Florida peninsula, it became a destination for curiosity-seekers and consumptives on doctors' orders to escape cold northern winters. The presence of Castillo de San Marcos, a coquina fort built by the Spanish and now controlled by the U.S. military and renamed Fort Marion, brought a larger military presence to town. A decade after Florida became a U.S. territory in 1821, the need for more and better visitor accommodations became pressing. Local residents began advertising rooms for rent with board (meals) included. This kind of lodging was in most cases a step above staying at a hotel.

=== Margaret Cook ===
While small-scale boarding houses were the norm, the times were favorable for a more ambitious approach. In 1830, Margaret Cook completed the process of purchasing the Ximenez House from its heirs. Cook had relocated to St. Augustine from Charleston with her second husband Samuel in 1821. A widow again by 1830, she had the freedom not routinely granted to married women of her day to transact business in her own name. She secured these rights through legal documents signed by her husband before his death.

Architect Herschel Shepard verified that the house was converted to add extra bedrooms during Cook's ownership. Cook hired Eliza Whitehurst — a widowed friend from Charleston who may have also been a close relative — and opened the house to boarders. Under Eliza's management, "Mrs. Whitehurst's boarding house' developed a reputation for high standards and good food. One guest noted, "...we were very fortunate in getting board at Mrs. Whitehurst's, considered the best in town." In 1835, 23 guests were recorded as having stayed at the house, with the majority coming from the northeast.

=== Sarah Petty Anderson ===
Eliza Whitehurst succumbed to illness in 1838, as did Margaret Cook's daughter. That year, Cook sold the boarding house to Sarah Petty Anderson for $4,000. She also sold Anderson an adjacent piece of property that she had purchased at auction the year before. This piece of land measured 57½ feet along Green Street (now Cadiz) to the west of the boarding house.

Anderson and her husband George were among the many newcomers to Florida in the early 1820s. Anderson's mother, Frances Kerr, had purchased 450 acres of land west of the Tomoka River in 1818 for a plantation known as the Ferry. In Kerr's will dated September 2, 1820, Anderson and her husband were named the heirs of the Ferry plantation. In 1829, the Andersons bought Mount Oswald, a 1,900-acre plantation at the junction of the Halifax and Tomoka rivers. They later bought a third plantation, which was burned during the Second Seminole War. The ruins of this Dunlawton Plantation and Sugar Mill still stand on Nova Road, west of Port Orange, Florida. The site was added to the U.S. National Register of Historic Places in 1973.

=== Louisa Fatio ===
By the end of the 1830s, Anderson was a widow living in St. Augustine. In the early 1840s, she hired Louisa Fatio to manage the Ximenez House as a boarding house. She retained Fatio as manager until 1855. That year, Fatio purchased the house for $3,000.

Louisa Fatio was the granddaughter of Francis Philip Fatio, co-founder and later sole owner of the 10,000-acre New Switzerland plantation on the St. Johns River west of St. Augustine, as well as two other large properties in North Florida. She was highly educated for a woman of her time. In 1812, the family's plantation house was attacked and partially burned during the East Florida Patriot War. After they rebuilt between 1822 and 1824, Louisa — who never married — helped her frail stepmother run the household.

The New Switzerland plantation was torched a second time during the Second Seminole War, which began in 1835. In 1836, Fatio moved to St. Augustine. The city was filled with military personnel and refugees from the war, and she found work managing boarding houses with her sister Eliza. Fatio's reputation for fine food and accommodations grew. First-hand accounts, such as Charles Lanman's Adventures in the Wilds of the United States, note her reputation as a hostess: "From personal experience I can speak of one...of these establishments kept by Miss Fatio, a most estimable and popular lady; and if the others are as home-like and comfortable as this, the ancient city may well be proud of her houses for the accommodation of travelers and invalids."

Under Fatio's management, the house on Aviles Street became known as Miss Fatio's. The establishment was a fixture in St. Augustine until her death in 1875. The Fatio House is a setting in Constance Fenimore Woolson's fictional story about visitors to St. Augustine. Titled "The Ancient City," it was published in two parts by Harper's New Monthly Magazine in 1874 and 1875.

Sometime after 1855, Fatio added a second floor of bedrooms above the one-story wing on the north end of the main house. For years, experts thought the addition was completed during Margaret Cook's ownership in the 1830s. The theory was overturned in 2009, when dendrochronology experts from the University of Florida and the University of Tennessee dated the wood in the framing of the upper-floor wing to the latter half of the 1850s.

Eugenia Price made Louisa Fatio a major character in her 1965 (commemorative edition 2008) novel, Margaret's Story, the third volume in Price's "Florida Trilogy." One of its settings is Fatio's boarding house in St. Augustine.

== Architecture and design ==
The original detached kitchen with beehive oven is located next to the main house.

Historic records and structural studies indicate that the main house and detached kitchen were built in 1798. Both are constructed of coquina rock quarried on nearby Anastasia Island. Coquina rock construction positions the house in the upper tier of St. Augustine residences of the Second Spanish Period. It is an exceptional example of St. Augustine Plan architecture. This hybrid style blends elements of Spanish Colonial architecture with more elegant Federal-style architecture introduced during Florida's British Period (1763-1784). The property's detached coquina kitchen with beehive oven is the only original 18th century detached kitchen in St. Augustine.

== Landmark designations ==
Ximenez-Fatio House has been restored and interpreted to reflect its function as a mid 19th century Florida boarding house.

Ximenez-Fatio House Museum is notable for:

- its architecture
- authenticity achieved through a decades-long restoration and interpretation process conducted by some of America's foremost historians and historic architects, and further informed by extensive archaeological exploration
- insights about Florida tourists and how they lived
- contributions to a deeper understanding of 19th century women's history in Florida

The property has been recognized with the following designations:

- 1936 — Historic American Buildings Survey
- 1973 — National Register of Historic Places
- 1984 — St. Augustine Town Plan National Historic Landmark District
- 2012 — Florida Heritage Landmark

== Florida's territorial period ==
In 1822, Florida was formally organized as the Florida Territory. No longer impeded by an international border, Americans began traveling to Florida. Naturalists who visited reported exotic flora and fauna. Adventurers came in hopes of making their fortunes in the new territory. Physicians in northeastern states recommended Florida's mild winters to patients suffering from a variety of illnesses, especially tuberculosis (consumption). Although travel to the Florida peninsula was arduous, St. Augustine became a popular destination. Visitors often stayed for several months. Most were accustomed to a higher standard of living than the typical St. Augustine resident enjoyed, and preferred the more individual attention offered in a boarding house, as opposed to the city's public hotels. This era in St. Augustine's history — after Florida was ceded to the United States in 1821 and well before the grand Flagler hotels opened in the second half of the 1880s — was the beginning of tourism in Florida. By 1834, there were six boarding houses in the city. More would open in the years ahead.

The central conflict during Florida's territorial period was with the Seminole. Earlier in the 1800s, a series of battles that was the first of three Seminole Wars sought to prevent Seminoles from harboring runaway slaves and to protect the right of white settlers to occupy land in Florida. A Second Seminole War began in 1835. It pivoted on the issue of Indian removal, a plan to move all Seminoles in Florida to land west of the Mississippi by 1835. A number of the Seminole chose to fight rather than leave their homes. In 1835, warriors led by Osceola began waging guerilla warfare. They attacked and burned plantations on the St. Johns River and elsewhere in Northeast and Central Florida. Local volunteers joined U.S. forces and state militia to fight the Seminoles. Fort Marion in St. Augustine became the center for U.S. military action, with Army officers often billeting at boarding houses and hotels in the city. Displaced settlers and families from nearby plantations sought refuge in St. Augustine. Visitors from outside Florida continued to travel to St. Augustine, though their numbers slowed during the heat of the conflict. During this tumultuous period, St. Augustine was crowded with people requiring room and board. In 1845, when Florida joined the Union as the 27th state, the boarding house industry was firmly established, with a reputation as a healing destination for invalids.

== Archaeological discoveries ==
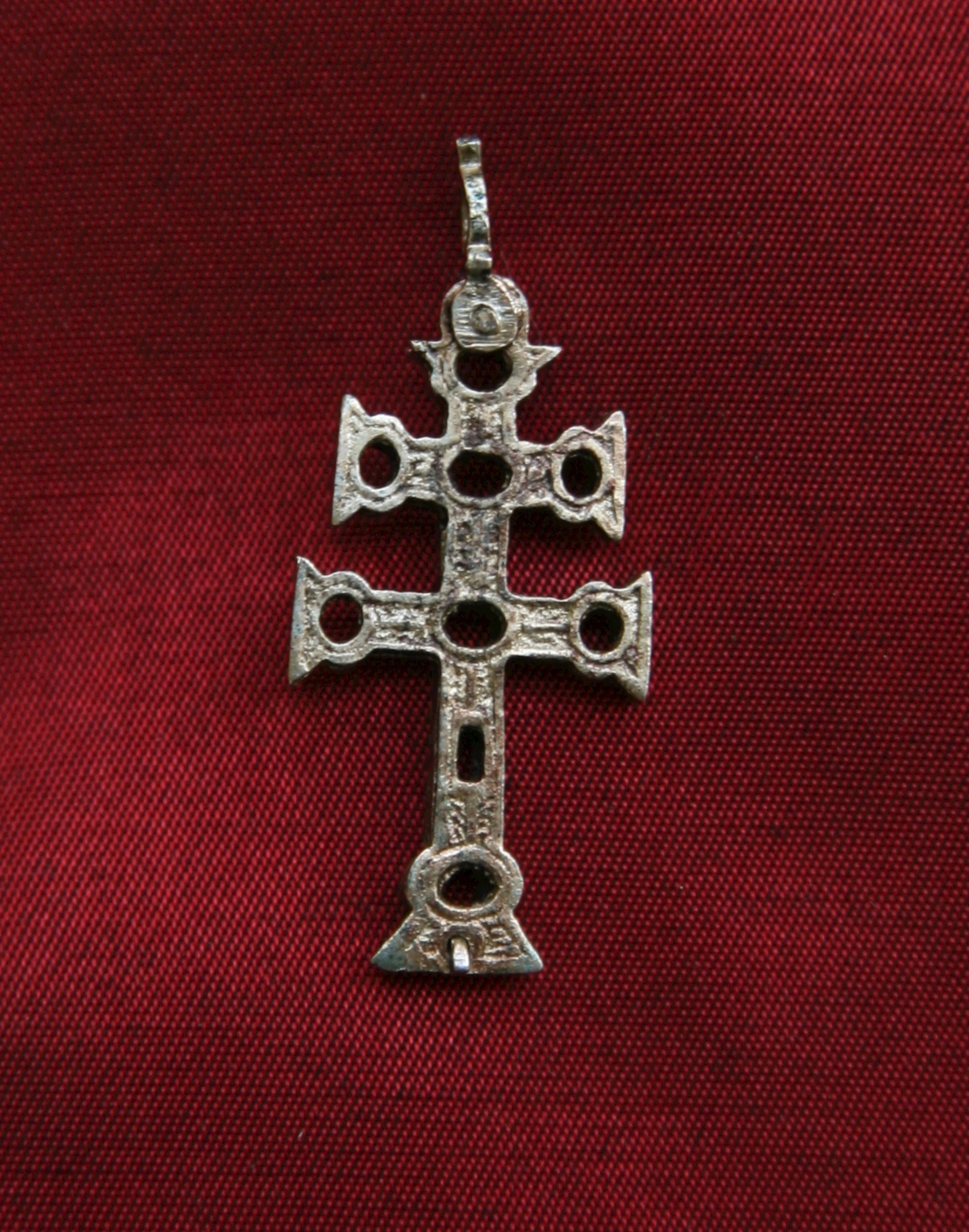
A 17th century white bronze Caravaca cross from Spain was found during a 2003 dig on the property.

The Ximenez-Fatio House has been the site of more than 15 archaeological digs — more than any other property in St. Augustine, according to St. Augustine City Archaeologist Carl Halbirt. Archaeologists including Dr. Charles Fairbanks, Dr. Kathleen Deagan and others have found evidence of human occupation on the property dating back to the 16th, 17th, 18th and 19th centuries. A sub-surface sampling survey of the city conducted by Dr. Deagan in 1976 placed the Ximenez-Fatio lot at the approximate center of the 16th century Spanish settlement. In 2015, she observed that the property continues to invite exploration — in part because, "there is occupation going back to the founding of St. Augustine, and so it's possible to really look at the whole spectrum of the city's occupation." According to Halbirt and Deagan, the high-ground position of the site — and artifacts discovered there — suggest that the property was inhabited by St. Augustine's upper class from the beginning of the colonial period and that there was continual activity in the centuries that followed.

Archaeological evidence of how people lived in 1800s St. Augustine helped to confirm the interpretation of the property as a boarding house. For example, animal bones in abandoned trash pits provided clues to what was served on the table, shards of china helped identify the pattern used during Sarah Petty Anderson's ownership, and a cache of silver buttons and pins led to the discovery of a laundry shed footprint. In 2003, archaeologists found a rare 17th-century double-barred, white bronze Caravaca cross at the bottom of a 19th-century trash pit. Crafted in Spain, it predates the boarding house era by two centuries and is the most mysterious object found on the site to date.

A major archaeological investigation began on February 3, 2015, at the front of the Ximenez-Fatio House property adjacent to Aviles Street. Led by Carl Halbirt, it concluded on March 14, 2015.

== Historical research ==
The Ximenez-Fatio House has been carefully investigated by leading historians, preservation architects and archaeologists.

After purchasing the Ximenez House in 1939, the Florida Dames were inspired by members of the Carnegie Restoration Committee to engage the most knowledgeable consultants available. Over the years, they have included architects Charles E. Peterson, Blair Reeves, Herschel Shepard, Charles Phillips and Joseph Oppermann; archaeologists Robert Steinbach, Dr. Charles Fairbanks, and, Kathleen Deagan; historians William Seale, Charles Tingley; and curator Robert Harper. Seale, who helped restore many historical American buildings, including a number of state capitals, conducted extensive research on the Ximenez-Fatio House in the 1970s. His research helped guide the Colonial Dames in their interpretation of the house during Florida's territorial days.

Historic sources include early maps and deed transfers, letters, journals, wills, marriage licenses and sales records. Researchers have also traced activity on the property using city maps that show footprints of residences built in St. Augustine during Spanish and British colonial times. The first recorded Spanish owner of the property was Cristoval Contreras. Artifacts found during a dig are believed to date from his occupation and corroborate with documentary evidence that Contreras was from the upper echelon of St. Augustine society.

Recorded deeds show four owners during St. Augustine's British Period. Evidence is strong that the Spanish Crown reclaimed the property after the British exited Florida in 1783, and that it was sold by auction in 1791. House historians point to a map (de la Rocque Map, on file at the St. Augustine Historical Society) from the period that depicts the ruins of a stone house on the site and a note on the 1791 transfer deed that reports a structure in shambles and a property assessed as "lot only".

A later transfer deed shows that the new owner sold the property to local merchant Don Andres Ximenez in 1797. At that time Ximenez already owned a house with general store across the street. The house with detached kitchen that he built on his new property was mentioned in his 1802 will, providing historians with a reference point to date construction. Ximenez's later will of 1806 lists the house and its contents, which included, "[a] grocery store and a billiard table with everything pertaining to it". Many of the store's contents appear to have been sold after his death. From sales records, historians have a window into a St. Augustine general store of that time. Ximenez sold tobacco, children's reading books, palm leaf brooms, assorted vases, empty bottles, reams of white paper and bone buttons.

Legal documents help visualize the house as originally built. An assessment of the property taken shortly after the death of Andres Ximenez calculated the approximate quantity and worth of the masonry and wood elements. In a report dated July 8, 1806, the city's Master Carpenter Martin Hernandez documented 15 doors, 16 windows, wood for floors, ceilings and partitions, a stairway with pantry underneath, handrail and balusters, a roof with four windows and wood for moldings and trimmings. Hernandez also counted three doors, three windows and a shingle roof for the kitchen building and noted additional wood structures such as a privy, wash shed and wooden fences. Jose Lorente, Master Mason, calculated the overall measurements of the main house and warehouses that housed merchandise for the Ximenez store. In general, the main house that has survived into the 21st century matches up well with this 1806 assessment.

== Restoration and interpretation ==
The dining room table is set with 19th century china patterns discovered during digs on the property.

For three decades after they acquired the property, the NSCDA-FL worked on repairs. In 1970, the house was awarded a National Trust for Historic Preservation grant. It enabled NSCDA-FL to hire architect Charles E. Peterson, considered one of the founding fathers of historic preservation in the United States. Previously, Peterson had established the Historic American Buildings Survey (HABS) and was a founding member of the Association for Preservation Technology (APT). He visited the Ximenez-Fatio House twice in 1972. His observations were published in an article titled "Tour of Ximenez-Fatio House" in the St. Augustine Record on January 8 and 9, 1972.

Peterson was a stickler for accurate restoration and truthful interpretation at a time when these were novel ideas. He taught the Dames how to find their interpretation period. Years of in-depth research followed. NSCDA-FL research committee members studied city maps, historic newspaper articles, letters and journals; compared details in related houses such as St. Augustine's Second Spanish Period Don Manuel Solana House; analyzed artifacts found underground; and consulted the findings of historians and architects. Their discoveries led them to focus on a little-known time in St. Augustine's history — the boarding house era, which was at its peak during the 1830s and 1840s. Following Peterson's advice, the Dames also documented house features in detail, published information to attract interest from the academic community, and got the property listed on the National Register of Historic Places.

Meanwhile, restoration efforts continued. Peterson introduced the Dames to architect Blair Reeves. Through Reeves, they hired architect Herschel Shepard. Shepard later helped restore the historic 1902 Florida State Capitol in Tallahassee, Fort Foster in Hillsborough County and other important sites in Florida. He was involved in Ximenez-Fatio House research and restoration from 1973 to 1979.

Based on physical evidence such as construction details, nail chronology and saw marks rather than solely on stylistic features, Shepard believed that most of the remodeling undertaken to transform the residence into a boarding house occurred between 1830 and 1840. He investigated features throughout the house with the object of understanding how the house was modified over time.

In 1975, the NSCDA-FL was awarded a National Trust for Historic Preservation grant to hire historical consultant William Seale. Seale was previously curator of cultural history at the Smithsonian Institution and a nationally known historian and author. He helped guide the Dames in their interpretation. Seale provided a summary of how he would interpret each room of the boarding house, including appropriate furnishings, room arrangements and resources for further research. The acquisitions committee then began a long search for house contents. Their primary guideline was that all pieces purchased for the house must be documented as having been available in St. Augustine during the interpretation period. Items were sourced from antique stores, estate sales and private collections in Northeast Florida, Southeast Georgia and elsewhere.

Seale's most recent visit to the property was in 2006. In his follow-up report, he called the boarding house interpretation executed by the Dames in the 1970s "as valid as ever, reflecting current interests in the history field over the nation." Seale conjectured that Ximenez-Fatio House Museum may be the first historic house in the country to feature the story of a succession of women surviving economically in what was considered a man's world, and commercializing their domestic skills to do so.

Ongoing preservation of Ximenez-Fatio House is funded through grants, NSCDA-FL dues and private donations. Joseph K. Oppermann is currently lead architect for the house.

== The National Society of The Colonial Dames of America in The State of Florida ==
Founded in 1891, The National Society of The Colonial Dames of America (NSCDA) is dedicated to inspiring understanding and respect for America's origins as a nation. The national organization and its 44 corporate societies are active in 43 states and the District of Columbia. Across America, Colonial Dames further their mission through patriotic programs, educational outreach, historical projects and in many other ways. For example, the NSCDA is a national leader in historic preservation, restoration and the interpretation of historic sites. The National Trust for Historic Preservation recognized its work at 85 historic properties with the Trustee Emeritus Award for the Stewardship of Historic Sites. NSCDA-FL, the Florida society of The Colonial Dames of America, owns and operates the Ximenez-Fatio House Museum in St. Augustine.

== Gallery ==
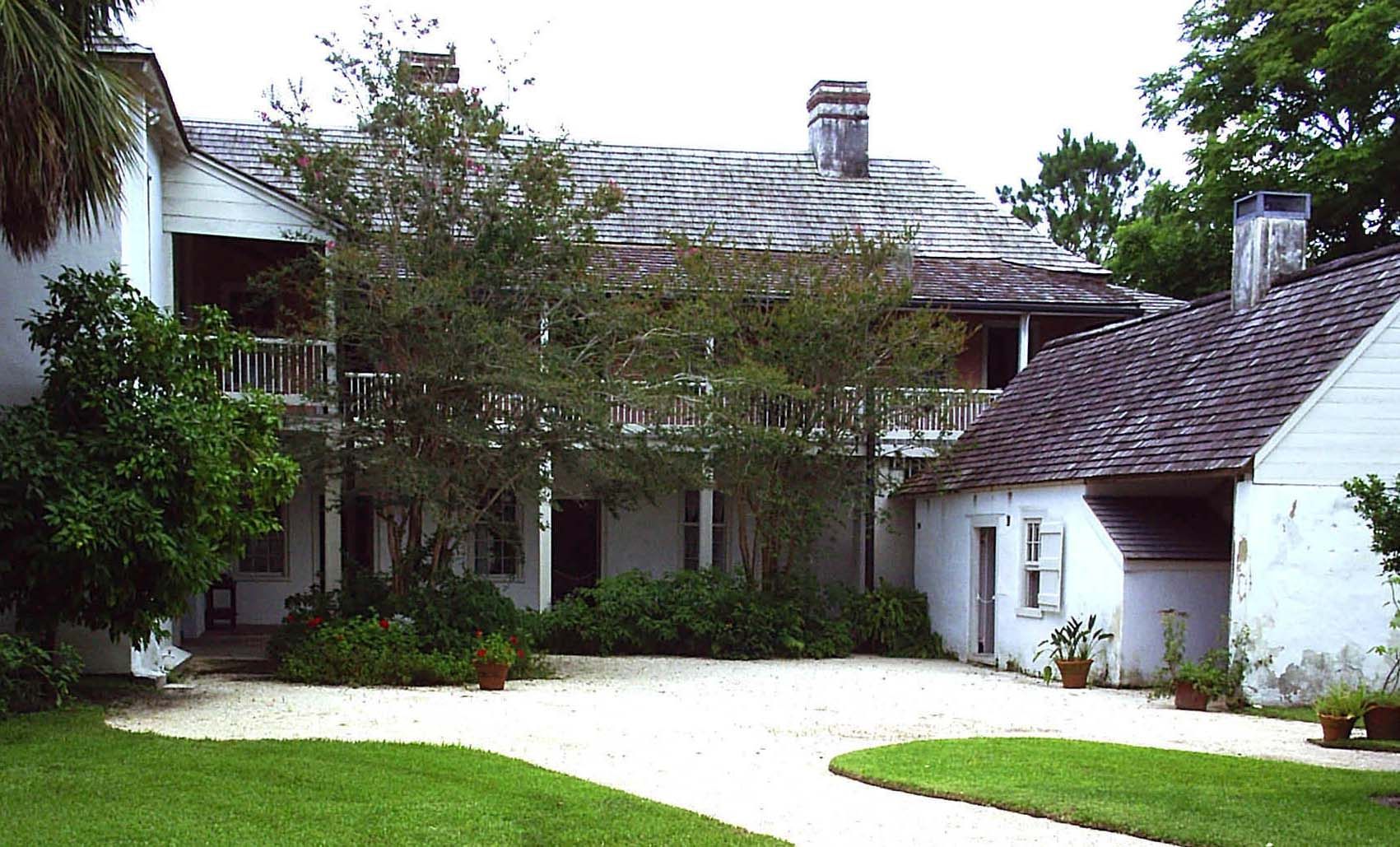
The Ximenez Fatio House Museum, St Augustine, FL.

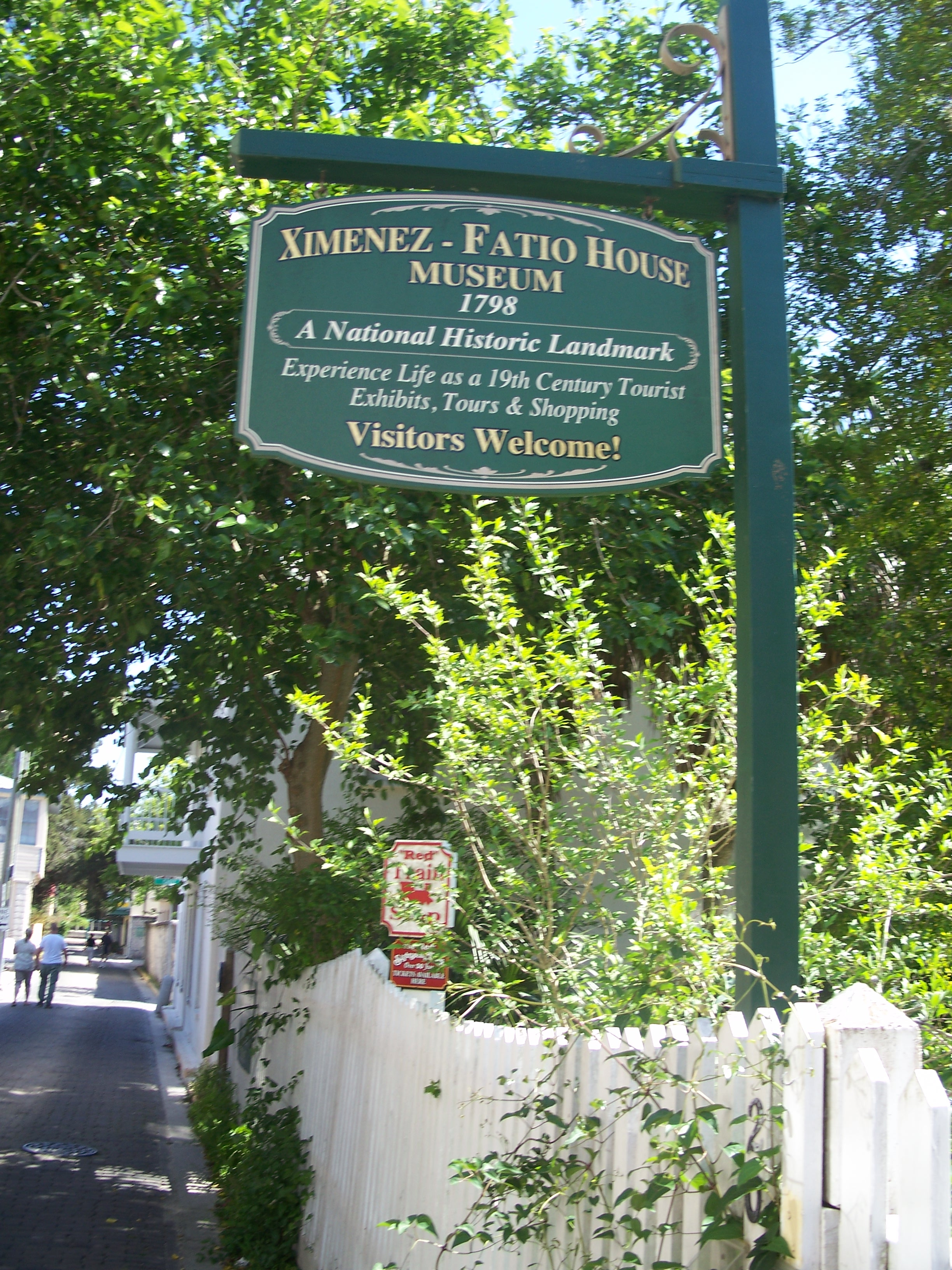

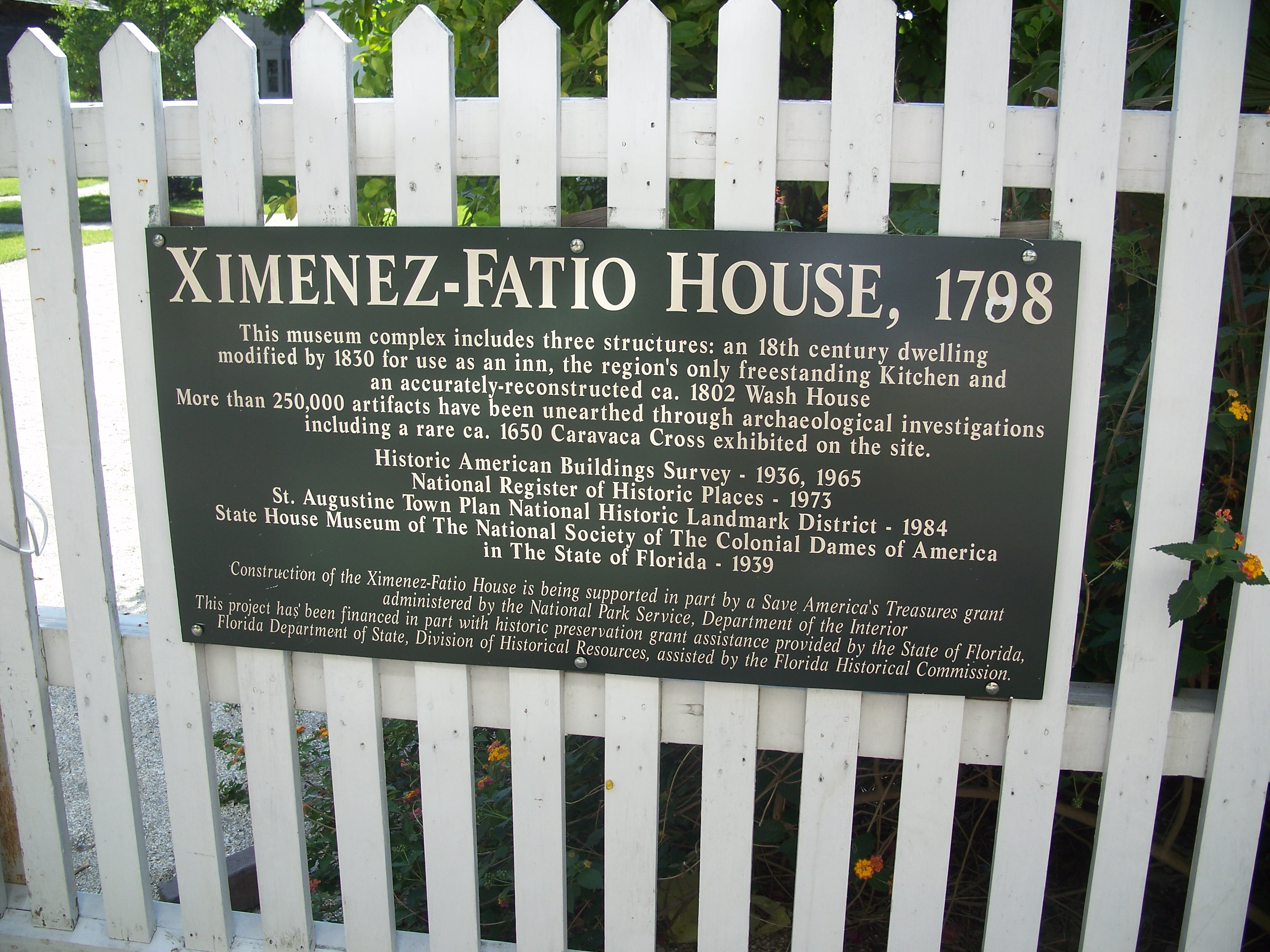

== Sources ==
- Gaske, Frederick P. (1982). The Archaeology of a Florida Antebellum Period Boarding House; The Ximenez Fatio House (MA). Tallahassee: Florida State University.
- Graham, Thomas (1978). The awakening of St. Augustine: The Anderson family and the oldest city, 1821-1924 (1st ed.). Saint Augustine Historical Society.
