= Morel (surname) =

Morel is a French surname meaning “dark”.

== Geographical distribution ==
As of 2014, 51.3% of all known bearers of the surname Morel were residents of France (frequency 1:719), 13.1% of Paraguay (1:306), 11.5% of the Dominican Republic (1:505), 7.4% of Argentina (1:3,188), 4.4% of the United States (1:45,440), 2.4% of Canada (1:8,346), 1.3% of Switzerland (1:3,389), 1.1% of Brazil (1:102,307) and 1.1% of Honduras (1:4,484).

In France, the frequency of the surname was higher than national average (1:719) in the following regions:

1. Réunion (1:180)
2. Auvergne-Rhône-Alpes (1:389)
3. Normandy (1:408)
4. Bourgogne-Franche-Comté (1:414)
5. Brittany (1:479)
6. Saint Pierre and Miquelon (1:582)
7. Hauts-de-France (1:586)
8. French Guiana (1:677)

In Paraguay, the frequency of the surname was higher than national average (1:306) in the following departments:

1. Caazapá Department (1:158)
2. Paraguarí Department (1:182)
3. San Pedro Department (1:192)
4. Canindeyú Department (1:249)
5. Amambay Department (1:263)

== People ==
- Adéodat Compère-Morel, French politician
- Alfred Morel-Fatio (1850–1924), French hispanist
- Antoine Léon Morel-Fatio (1810–1871), French painter
- Bénédict Morel (1809–1873), Austrian-French psychiatrist
- Brent Morel (born 1987), American major league baseball player
- Camille de Morel (1547–1611), French poet and writer
- Carlos Morel (1813–1894), Argentine painter
- Carlos Morel (born 1987), Argentine footballer
- Cecilia Morel (born 1954), former First Lady of Chile
- Charlotte Morel (born 1972), professional French triathlete
- Christopher Morel (born 1999), Dominican baseball player
- Claire Morel (born 1984), French footballer
- Claudio Marcelo Morel Rodríguez, Paraguayan footballer
- Clément Morel (born 1984), French tennis player
- Clement or Clemens Morel (fl. 1534–1552), (probably a single) French composer
- Edmund Dene Morel (1873–1924), Franco-British journalist and politician
- Edmund Morel (1840–1871), English-born railway engineer
- Fernando Morel (born 1958), Argentine retired rugby union player
- François Morel (1926–2018), Canadian composer, pianist, conductor and music educator
- François Morel (born 1959), French actor and filmmaker
- François M. M. Morel (born 1944), French-born biogeochemist
- Gaël Morel (born 1972), French film director
- Guillaume Morel (1505–1564), French classical scholar
- Jean Baptiste Morel (1662–1732), Flemish painter
- Jean-Baptiste Morel (1854–1927), French politician
- Jérémy Morel (born 1984), French footballer
- Jorge Morel (1931–2021), Argentine classical guitarist and composer
- Juan Morel Campos (1857–1896), Puerto Rican composer
- Julie Morel (born 1982), French footballer
- Lely Morel (1909–2013), Argentine film actress
- Léonard Morel-Ladeuil (1820–1888), French goldsmith and sculptor
- Louis Saint Ange Morel, chevalier de la Colombe (1755–1825), French soldier
- Manuel Armoa Morel (born 2002), Argentine volleyball player
- Margaret Morel (1958–2019), Seychellois middle-distance runner
- Marie-Rose Morel (1972–2011), Belgian politician
- Martín Morel (born 1980), Argentine retired footballer
- Olivier Morel de La Durantaye (1640–1716), colonial officer in New France
- Pierre Morel (born 1964), French cinematographer and film director
- Richard Morel (fl. 1995– ), American singer, songwriter, remixer and record producer
- Salomon Morel (1919–2007), Polish-Jewish commander of the Zgoda concentration camp in Świętochłowice
- Sophie Morel (born 1979), French mathematician
- Sylvie Morel (born 1956), Canadian wheelchair fencer
- Thierry Morel, French art historian and curator
- Tom Morel (1915–1944), French Resistance Fighter
- Yoryi Morel (1906–1979), painter from the Dominican Republic

== Fictional characters ==
- Morel, a character in the 1940 novel The Invention of Morel
- Claudette Morel, a character in the 2016 online multiplayer horror game Dead by Daylight

== See also ==
- Morell (name)
