= Morrell =

Morrell is a surname, and may refer to:

- Andy Morrell (born 1974), English footballer
- Arthur Fleming Morrell (1788-1880), English naval captain and explorer
- Arthur R.H. Morrell (1878–1968), a Deputy Master of Trinity House
- Benjamin Morrell (c. 1795–1838 or 1839?), American sealing captain and explorer
- Bill Morrell (1893-1975), American Major League Baseball pitcher
- Cynthia Hedge-Morrell (born 1947), American educator and politician, wife of Arthur Morrell
- Cyril Morrell, English rugby league footballer of the 1930s
- Daniel Johnson Morrell (1821-1885), American politician
- David Morrell (writer) (born 1943), Canadian novelist
- Dawn Morrell (born 1949), American politician
- Digby Morrell (born 1979), former Australian rules footballer
- Douglas Wellesley Morrell (1917-1996), British electrical engineer
- Edith Alice Morrell, possible victim of suspected serial killer John Bodkin Adams
- Edward Morrell (1868–1946), American Old West train robbery accomplice and prison reform advocate
- E. D. Morel (1873–1924) British journalist, anti-war activist, whistleblower
- Edward de Veaux Morrell (1863-1917), American politician
- Frances Morrell (1937-2010), British politician
- Galya Morrell (born 1961), artist and explorer
- Geoff Morrell (actor) (born 1958), Australian actor
- Geoff Morrell (spokesperson) (born 1968), American reporter and Pentagon spokesman
- George Morrell (football manager) (1872-after 1915), Scottish football manager
- George Herbert Morrell (1845–1906), English politician
- George Truman Morrell (1830–1912), British naval officer and explorer
- Gladys Morrell (1888–1969), Bermudian suffragette
- Glen E. Morrell, United States Sergeant Major of the Army from 1983 to 1987
- John Bowes Morrell (1873–1963), English author, historian and twice Lord Mayor of York
- John Morrell (rugby league), rugby league footballer of the 1920s
- Jack Morrell (historian of science), University of Leeds, England
- Jack Morrell (boxer) (born 1955), American boxer
- Jemima Morrell (1832–1909), English traveller and illustrator
- Lloyd Morrell (1907–1996), Anglican bishop
- Jessica Page Morrell, American writer
- Jill Morrell (born 1957), girlfriend of and campaigner for the release of kidnapped journalist John McCarthy
- Joe Morrell (born 1997), Welsh footballer
- Jonathan Morrell, British television and radio presenter
- Jules or Julie Morrell (died 1911), New York gangster
- Leslie Morrell (born 1931), former Northern Ireland unionist politician
- Michael Morell (born 1958), former deputy director and acting director of the Central Intelligence Agency
- Mike Morrell (born 1952), American politician
- Nidia Morrell (born 1953), Argentine astronomer
- Lady Ottoline Morrell (1873-1938), English aristocrat and society hostess
- Paul Morrell, English quantity surveyor and the UK Government's first Chief Construction Adviser (2009-2012)
- Paul Morrell (footballer) (born 1961), former English footballer
- Philip Morrell (1870-1943), British politician
- Sean Morrell (born 1986), Fijian rugby union player
- Teige Morrell (born 1995), American basketball player
- Thomas Baker Morrell DD FRSE (1815-1877) Bishop of Edinburgh
- William Parker Morrell (1899–1986), New Zealand historian and professor

== See also ==
- Morrel (a family name in The Count of Monte Cristo)
