= Roy Morell =

Lt Col Roy Morell DSO OBE
- Born: 24 May 1889; Wollongong, New South Wales
- Died: 28 June 1961 (aged 72); Sydney, New South Wales
- Military career
- Allegiance: Australia
- Branch: Australian Army
- Service years: 1914–1919; 1943–1945
- Rank: Lieutenant Colonel
- Commands: 6th Light Horse Regiment; Australian Army Movement Control
- Conflicts: First World War; Gallipoli Campaign; Second World War
- Awards: Officer of the Order of the British Empire; Distinguished Service Order; Mentioned in Despatches (3)
- Other work: Stockbroker; Honorary Treasurer; Royal Agricultural Society of New South Wales & Fairbridge Farm Schools of NSW

Lieutenant Colonel Roy Morell DSO, OBE (24 May 1889 – 28 June 1961) was an Australian wool broker, grazier and stockbroker who volunteered for war service during World War I and World War II.

== Birth and education ==
Morell was born in Wollongong, New South Wales, son of Frances Helen (née Hopkins) and James Harris Morell. He was educated at Wolaroi College and from 1903 at Newington College.

== Woolbroker and grazier ==
After school, Morell worked for Goldsbrough Mort & Co. and owned Tullochard out of Inverell.

== War service ==
On 17 September 1914, Morell enlisted as a sergeant in the 6th Light Horse Regiment, A Squadron, and embarked from Sydney on 21 December 1914. He served in the Gallipoli Campaign. Morell became a member of the 5th Machine Gun Battalion and served in France. He was promoted to 2nd Lieutenant in August 1915, Lieutenant in October 1915, Captain in March 1916 and Major in March 1917. He married Frances Ione Pole-Carew, a VAD stationed in Malta, on 18 November 1918. Morell returned to Australia on 6 May 1919 and was discharged on 3 July 1919. He volunteered again in the Second World War and as a Lieutenant Colonel was second-in-command in Sydney for Australian Army Movement Control.

== Military awards ==
- In June 1917 he was awarded the Distinguished Service Order

- In June 1919 he was named an Officer of the Order of the British Empire

- Mentioned in Despatches three times

- 1914–15 Star

- British War Medal

- Victory Medal

== Stockbroker ==
In 1936, Morell sold his rural interests and moved to Sydney becoming a sole trader on the Sydney Stock Exchange. In 1939 he became a partner of R.V. Spier & Morell. He was a member of the Stock Exchange committee in 1942, 1946 and 1947.

== Community service ==
Morell was a director of Sydney Hospital and Honorary Teasurer of Fairbridge Farm Schools of NSW. For 23 years he was Honorary Treasurer of the Royal Agricultural Society of New South Wales.
