= Joaqui =

Spanish footballer (born 1991)

Personal information
- Full name: Joaquín del Moral Sánchez
- Date of birth: 31 May 1991 (age 35)
- Place of birth: Chipiona, Spain
- Height: 1.78 m (5 ft 10 in)
- Position: Centre back

Team information
- Current team: Xerez Deportivo

Youth career
- Xerez

Senior career*
Years	Team	Apps	(Gls)
2010–2013	Xerez B	43	(0)
2012	Xerez	2	(0)
2013–2016	Pobla Mafumet	87	(3)
2016–2017	Sanluqueño	11	(0)
2017–2019	Xerez Deportivo	70	(0)
2019	Arcos	13	(0)
2020–	Xerez Deportivo	3	(0)
- * Club domestic league appearances and goals as of 23:33, 23 January 2020 (UTC)

Joaquín del Moral Sánchez (born 31 May 1991), commonly known as Joaqui, is a Spanish footballer who plays for Xerez Deportivo FC as a central defender.

== Club career ==
Born in Chipiona, Province of Cádiz, Andalusia, Joaqui finished his formation with Xerez CD. He made his debut as a senior with the reserves in 2010, representing them in the regional leagues.

Joaqui made his official debut for the Andalusians' first team on 5 May 2012, playing the last 11 minutes of a 1–2 away loss against SD Huesca in the Segunda División. On 9 August 2013 he signed with CF Pobla de Mafumet of the Tercera División.

On 14 July 2016, Joaqui joined Segunda División B club Atlético Sanluqueño CF. The following 23 January, he moved to amateurs Xerez Deportivo FC.
