= Jemima Morrell =

English traveller and illustrator (1832–1909)

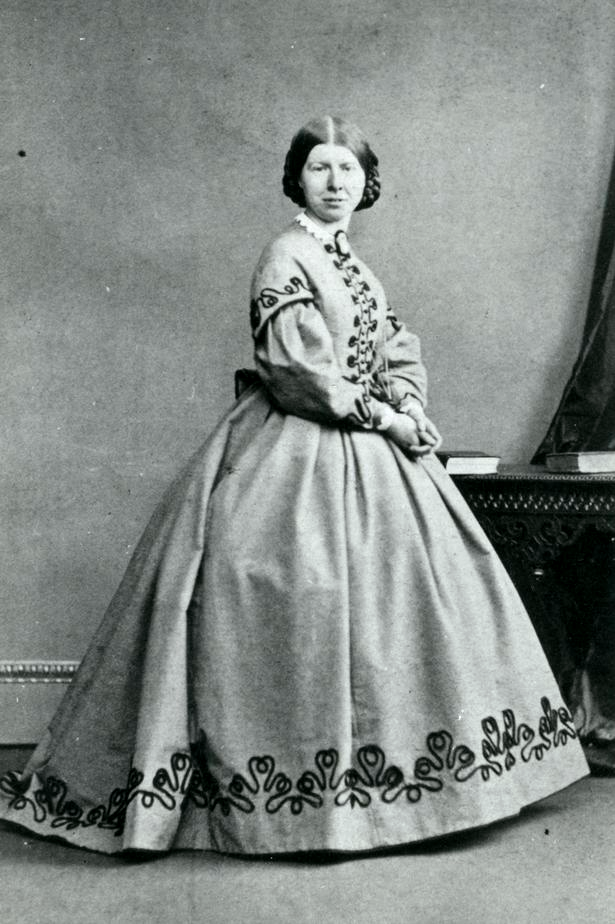
- Undated photograph
- Born: Jemima Anne Morrell; 7 March 1832; Selby, Yorkshire, England
- Died: 13 October 1909 (aged 77); Yorkshire, England
- Known for: Miss Jemima's Swiss Journal
- Spouse: John Broadley Greenwood (m. 1867; died 1906)
- Children: 1

Jemima Anne Morrell (7 March 1832 – 13 October 1909) was an English traveller and illustrator. Morrell was born into a middle-class family in Selby, Yorkshire and was a member of the Junior United Alpine Club, a club with majority women members that organised annual holiday trips. Morrell was one of the tourists who in 1863 partook in the first ever guided tour of Switzerland, led and conducted by Thomas Cook, making her one of the first modern international tourists. Her account of the journey was published in 1963 under the title Miss Jemima's Swiss Journal: The First Conducted Tour of Switzerland.

== Biography ==
=== Early life ===
Jemima Anne Morrell was born on 7 March 1832 in Selby, Yorkshire. Her parents were Robert Morrell, a bank manager in Selby, and Anna Morrell. Jemima was second-eldest of four children and had the elder brother Robert and younger siblings Anna and William. The Morrell family were part of a new middle class formed in the aftermath of the Industrial Revolution. The family had enough wealth to finance all of the children attending private schools and employed a housemaid and a cook.

Morrell was still unmarried in 1863 and was an aspiring artist. Morrell was a member of the Junior United Alpine Club, a social club that organised annual holiday trips. By 1863, members of the club had already gone on trips to Scotland, Land's End and London (having attended the 1862 International Exhibition). The majority of the members of the club were women, who outnumbered men by four to three.

=== Switzerland trip ===
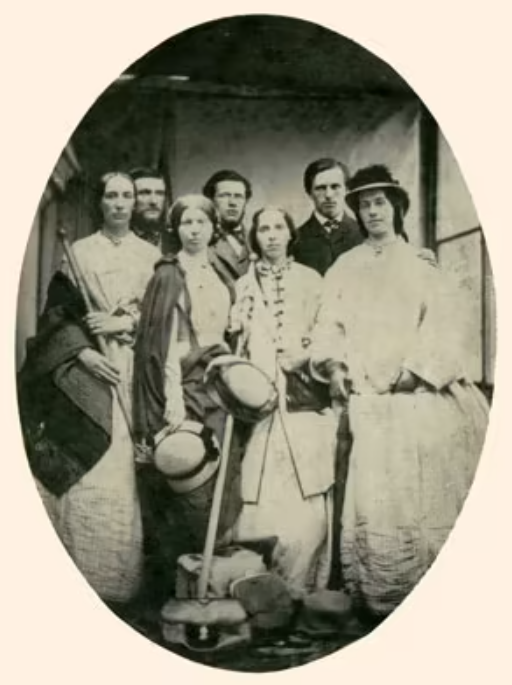
Some members of the Junior United Alpine Club, including Morrell (second from the left in the front row)

In 1863, Morrell travelled on the first ever guided tour of Switzerland, led and conducted by Thomas Cook. Morrell went on the tour together with her brother William and cousin Sarah Ayres, two friends, and a group of nearly 60 other tourists, including many members of the Junior United Alpine Club. Morrell's participation on the tour was funded by her brother William, who followed in their father's footsteps as a banker and had recently earnt a "very small fortune" through the publication of a text on income tax. Her party paid 680 francs for circular tickets. The trip took three weeks and Morrell kept a journal of her experiences during the journey. The journal kept by Morrell is an important historical document since it records every detail of the tour in Switzerland, one of the trips that can be seen as marking the origins of modern international tourism. Cook's trips were successful when it came to women tourists since single women could travel as part of travel groups without fearing for their safety.

The United Alpine Club began their journey to Switzerland on the morning of 26 June 1863. They first travelled from London to Newhaven by train. In her journal, Morrell observed concerning Newhaven that there was "not a drearier port anywhere". From Newhaven, they took a boat to Dieppe in Normandy from where they then travelled to Paris. From Paris, they travelled to Geneva in Switzerland. When they were leaving Geneva, Morrell records that she and her companions were so eager that they were "downstairs before the servants" and despite constant rain began walking "at the rate of four miles an hour". Morrell and the other women on the trip continuously wore corsets and crinoline dresses though they do not appear to have impended them, even when they went mountain climbing. They awoke at four in the morning every day and were determined to get as much out of the trip as possible; some days the party walked for more than 17 miles (27 kilometres). In her journal she recorded how they at times walked along slippery ledges, safeguarded only by ropes fastened to rocks. According to Morrell, the toughest portion of the journey was walking up the Gemmi Pass but the party still had enough energy by the time they reached the top to engage in a snowball fight. Morrell noted that the women used their umbrellas to fend off snowballs thrown at them. Despite the often perilous journey, Morrell noted that "the dangers of Alpine travel may be divided into two classes, the real and the imaginary, and in the retrospect, it was found that ours all belonged to the latter."

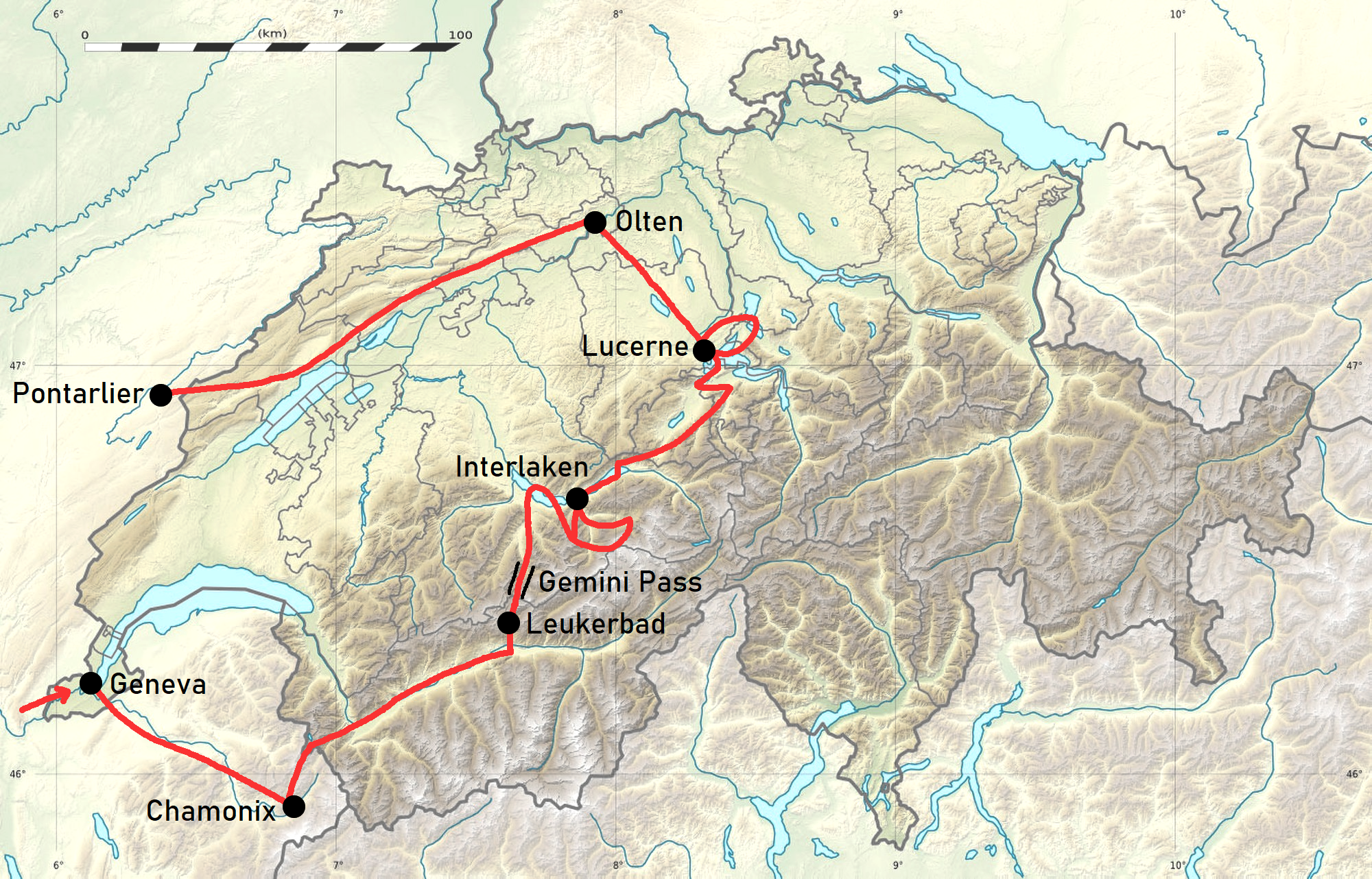
Map of the path taken on the 1863 Switzerland trip

The journey ended at Pontarlier on 15 July. After having finished the trip, the Junior United Alpine Club spent four days in Paris. Morrell concluded her account with the reflection "If any test were wanted of the powers of endurance of the Alpine Club, it is here given, that nearly all were able to go sightseeing in Paris with the same energy that characterised their proceedings all along." The tourists greatly enjoyed their trip to Switzerland. Her journal gives a light-hearted account of the journey and also reveals her and her companions as part of an at the time new form of traveller. In contrast to earlier tourists, Morrell's party went for the fun of exploring a new part of the world and made no pretensions that it had anything to do with education or culture or that the antiquities and scenery they encountered were the main purpose of the journey rather than being incidental.

Morrell's account also gives a snapshot of Victorian travelling and tourist groups; among other details, she mentions how the "obligatory jester" Tom insisted on referring to other members of the group by thee and thou to "lighten the toils of the way", the "extortionate" prices of souvenirs, and a humorous episode in which the customs at Dieppe taxed Sarah Ayres's "veritable Yorkshire tarts" at fifty cents. At one point while in the Chamonix valley, Morrell critiqued a guestbook for demanding excessive personal information, writing that the book was "one of the most inquisitorial of its kind we ever met with – one not merely satisfied with knowing your present whereabouts but demanding on government authority the past, present and future of your history" and that the information the group left "considerably enlightened those authorities!"

Morrell's descriptions of the sights of Switzerland were sometimes copied nearly verbatim from earlier travel journals. Her description of the Giessbach was for instance nearly identical to an earlier description in one of the Murray's Handbooks for Travellers. At other points, the descriptions were clearly her own, detailed and based on what she had seen, and she sometimes also explicitly disagreed with observations of earlier travellers or compared them with her own. Her view of Switzerland was also influenced by poets and painters that Morrell admired and who she frequently named in her writings. Among those quoted were the poet William Wordsworth and the painter and writer John Ruskin. Morrell's journal also includes marked favoritism of Protestant Christianity common in travel accounts from her time; she describes Catholic areas as being home to ignorant peasants and unaccomodating and dirty chalets whereas Protestant areas are described as much tidier and grander.

=== Later life ===
Morrell illustrated her brother William's book on the history of Selby, The History and Antiquities of Selby in West Riding in the County of York, published in 1867.

In 1867, Morrell married the wealthy landowner John Broadley Greenwood, a widower who was ten years older than her. The couple had a single child, the son Robert Morrell Greenwood, born on 21 January 1868. The family, which included three children of Greenwood from his previous marriage, moved first to Lytham St Annes in Lancashire, then to Somerset, and finally back to Yorkshire. Greenwood died in Yorkshire in 1906 and Morrell died shortly after him on 13 October 1909. Morrell was buried in a small country churchyard in East Morton.

== Legacy ==
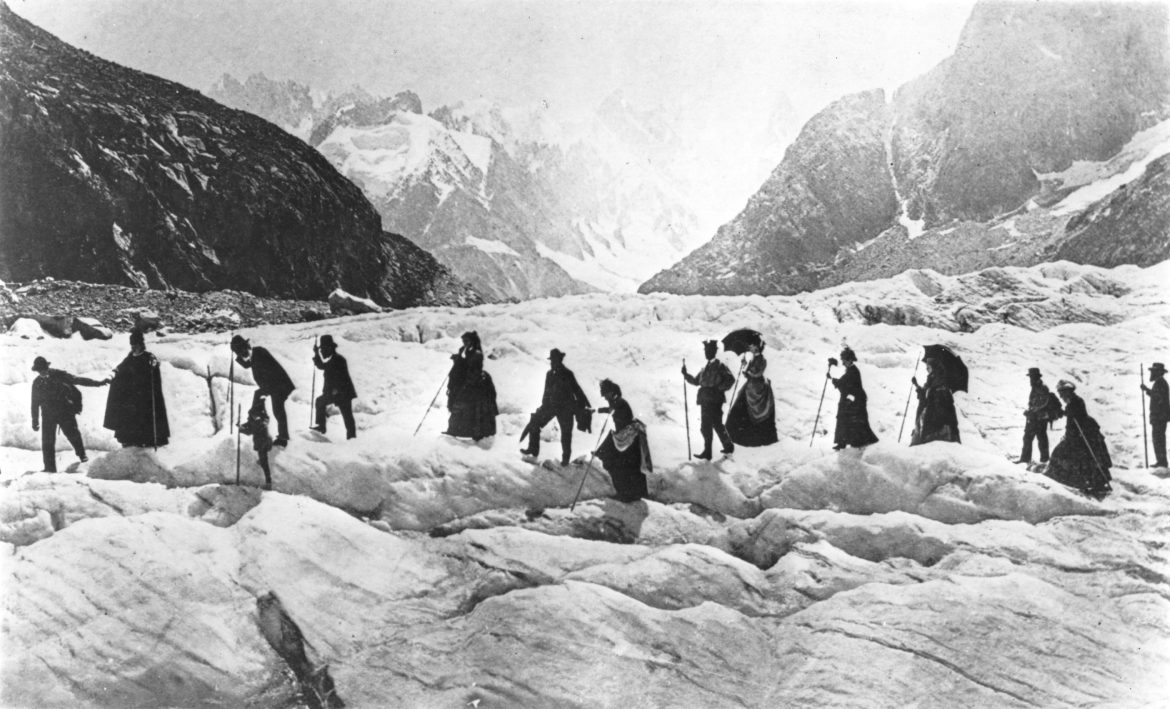
A group of Victorian tourists in the Swiss Alps

Since Morrell's journal revealed little about its author beyond her first name, her identity long remained a mystery. The account of the journal itself was also lost for many decades since it had only been intended to be read by members of the Junior United Alpine Club. The journal would likely never have been published at all if a copy had not been found in a tin box in Thomas Cook's destroyed warehouse in London during the Blitz of World War II. The journal was published in 1963 under the title Miss Jemima's Swiss Journal: The First Conducted Tour of Switzerland. The publicity generated by its publication led to the identification of the author as Jemima Morrell; the author Anne Vernon was researching a prominent Yorkshire family for a book and found letters from a trip to Switzerland. Vernon cross-referenced these with the travel journal and with records from Thomas Cook's archives.

Morrell's son Robert married a woman called Margaret Leir and was awarded a CBE in 1918. Due to Robert dying childless in 1947 she has no living descendants. Her close relatives in the Morrell family have been influential in Yorkshire and connected to Morrell's legacy. Jemima Morrell's nephew John Bowes Morrell (son of her brother William) served as Lord Mayor of York and was involved in the creation of the York Castle Museum. John's son William and grandson Nicholas participated in a trip to Switzerland in 1963 to mark the 100th anniversary of Morrell's journey. In 2013, the travelling company Inntravel, based in North Yorkshire, launched a series of tours based on Morrell's writings to mark the 150th anniversary of her journey. Among the people who embarked on the first such trip were John Morrell, son of William and brother of Nicholas. For the 150th anniversary, Inntravel and Switzerland Tourism also held a competition to find a "modern-day Jemima" to follow in her footsteps on a commemorative journey and record their experience in "21st-century style through blogs and tweets".

The British poet and novelist Helen Mort published a collection of poems, No Map Could Show Them, in 2016, inspired by "women who dared to break new ground", and directly cited Jemima Morrell who "hiked the Swiss peaks in her skirts and petticoats" and the modern mountain climber Alison Hargreaves (1962–1995) as two major inspirations. Mort had earlier in 2012 in homage to Morrell hiked in Switzerland in a replica crinoline dress.

== Literature ==
- Morrell, Jemima (2014). Miss Jemimas Journal: Eine Reise durch die Alpen (in German) (1 ed.). Rogner & Bernhard. ISBN 9783954030507. German translation.
- Bewes, Diccon (2017). Slow Train to Switzerland: One Tour, Two Trips, 150 Years and a World of Change Apart. Nicholas Brealey. ISBN 9781857886511. A travel journalist recreates Morrell's travel, and revisits the beginnings of tourism in Switzerland.
