= Morrill =

Morrill may refer to:

== Locations in the United States ==
- Morrill, Kansas
- Morrill Township, Brown County, Kansas
- Morrill, Maine
- Morrill Township, Morrison County, Minnesota
- Morrill, Nebraska
- Morrill County, Nebraska
- Morrill, Texas

== People ==
- Annie Morrill Smith, botanist and genealogist
- Amos Morrill, a U.S. Federal Court Judge
- Anson P. Morrill, Governor of Maine and U.S. Congressman
- Charles Henry Morrill, businessman prominent in the history of Nebraska
- David L. Morril (note spelling), Governor of New Hampshire and U.S. Senator
- Edmund Needham Morrill, Governor of Kansas and U.S. Congressman
- James Morrill, former president of the Univ. of Minnesota
- John Morrill (baseball), baseball player for the Boston Beaneaters
- John Morrill (historian)
- John Morrill (Wisconsin pioneer)
- Justin Smith Morrill, U.S. Senator from Vermont, whose namesake legislation includes:
  - Morrill Land-Grant Colleges Act
  - Morrill Tariff
  - Morrill Anti-Bigamy Act
- Lot M. Morrill, Governor of Maine, U.S. Senator, and Secretary of the U.S. Treasury under President Grant
- Mary Morrill, early Nantucket settler and grandmother of Benjamin Franklin
- Rowena Morrill, artist and illustrator
- Samuel P. Morrill, U.S. Congressman from Maine
- Sam Morril, comedian
- Stew Morrill, head coach of the Utah State University men's basketball team
- Walter Goodale Morrill, recipient of the Medal of Honor

== See also ==
- Merrill (disambiguation)
- Morrell, a surname
