= John Bowes Morrell =

English historian (1873–1963)

John Bowes Morrell Cllr. Ald. Freeman
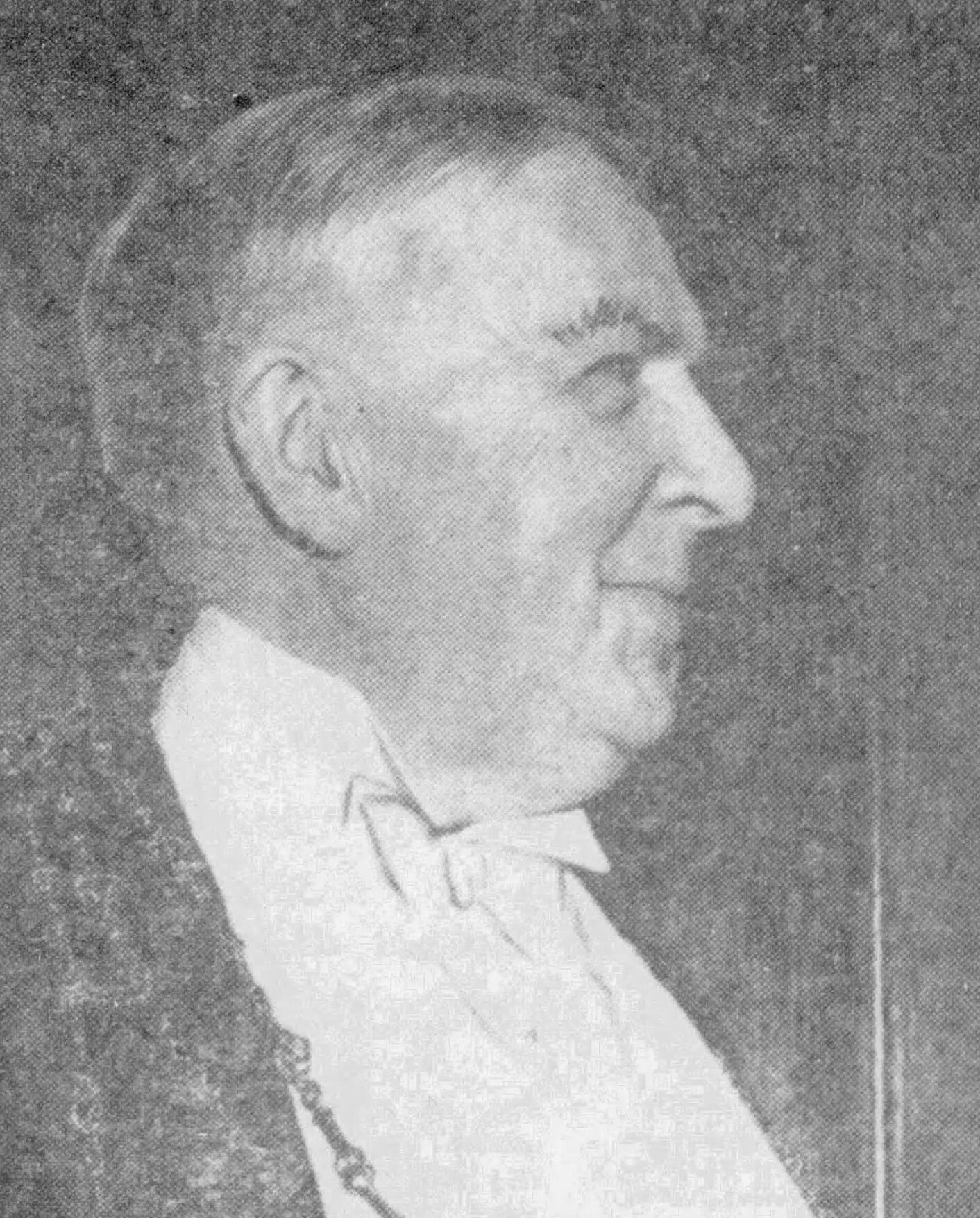
- Morrell in 1950

Lord Mayor of York
- In office 1949–1950
- Monarch: George VI
- Preceded by: William Dobbie
- Succeeded by: Ernest Harwood
- In office 1914–1915
- Monarch: George V
- Preceded by: Henry Rhodes Brown
- Succeeded by: William Alexander Forster Todd

York City Councillor
- In office 1905–1945

Personal details
- Born: 1873
- Died: 1963 (aged 89–90)
- Party: Liberal Progressives
- Spouse: Bertha Spence Watson (m. 1902–1954)
- Parents: William Wilberforce Morrell (father); Lydia Hutchinson (mother)
- Education: Bootham School, York
- Occupation: Politician, author and historian
- Known for: Conservation; University founder; Liberalism

John Bowes Morrell (1873–1963) was an English historian and writer. He was twice Lord Mayor of York, a leading figure in the local movement to establish a university in York, and founder of the York Conservation Trust. The J.B. Morrell Library at the University of York is named after him.

== Biography ==
John Morrell's father was William Wilberforce Morrell (1837–1904), a bank manager in York, and the author of 'The History of Selby' which was illustrated by his sister Jemima. His mother, born Lydia Hutchinson (1832–1939) married the non-conformist Morrell, who was a Wesleyan Methodist, whilst it appears she was a Quaker. Their religiosity seems to have been behind John's activism in Liberal Politics from a young age.

In 1884 John attended Bootham School, a Quaker establishment. It was at this school where he was to meet his future colleagues at the Rowntree's family chocolate and confectionery company, Arnold Rowntree and Seebohm Rowntree.

Morrell joined Rowntree's Cocoa Works when he was 17, becoming Director at 24. He was Mayor of York in 1914 and again in 1950.

John Morrell married Bertha Spence Watson (1877–1954) in the Friends Meeting House at Newcastle-upon-Tyne in 1902. Her mother Elizabeth Spence Watson's Family Chronicles explained that in "1877 ... our Darling little Bertha was given to us on the 18th of May. I recovered nicely, & the new baby, like all of her sisters in turn before her, was much made of, & considered the greatest treasure ..."

He bought many newspapers, including the Birmingham Gazette, Lincolnshire Chronicle, and Westminster Press.

== Historian of York ==
He wrote several books about York. He was made an Honorary Freeman of the City of York, given honorary degrees and declined a knighthood. He was a Life Vice-President of the Yorkshire Philosophical Society and co-founder and first chairman of the York Civic Trust.

=== York Conservation Trust ===
The York Conservation Trust (YCT) was formed as Ings Property Company Limited in 1945 by JBM and his brother Cuthbert Morrell, who had both been buying medieval properties in York for many years, which they restored and rehabilitated, together with Dr Morrell’s son Mr William Bowes Morrell. In 1976 they bequeathed all the properties in the company to the current registered charity, York Conservation Trust Limited.

== Legacy ==
A plaque to Morrell is on the exterior of 111 Walmgate, also known as Bowes Morrell House. The library, built on the campus of the University of York was named after Morrell in 1966.

== Select publications ==
- Morrell, J.B. 1928. How York Governs Itself: Civic Government as Illustrated by the County of the City of York.
- Morrell, J.B. and Watson, A.G. (eds) 1933. Whitehall at York. How York is governed by the ministers of the Crown.
- Morrell, J.B. 1944. York Monuments (The Arts and Crafts in York).
- Morrell, J.B. 1947. The Biography of the Common Man of the City of York as recorded in his epitaph.
- Morrell, J.B 1949. Woodwork in York.
- Morrell, J.B 1955. “The City of Our Dreams”.
