= John Morrell (rugby league) =

English rugby league footballer

Playing information
Club
Years	Team	Pld	T	G	FG	P
1921–22/23	Featherstone Rovers	24	1	0	0	3

Jack Morrell was a professional rugby league footballer who played in the 1920s. He played at club level for Featherstone Rovers.

== Club career ==
John Morrell made his début for Featherstone Rovers on Monday 29 August 1921.

== Post-playing ==
After his rugby career Jack went into politics having joined the Labour party. He was elected a councillor in Pontefract in 1945, and in 1953 became the 482nd Mayor of Pontefract. Jack was a publican, and was at the time he became mayor, landlord of the Windmill Hotel in Pontefract and chairman of the local Licensed Victuallers’' Association.
