= Alfred Morel-Fatio =

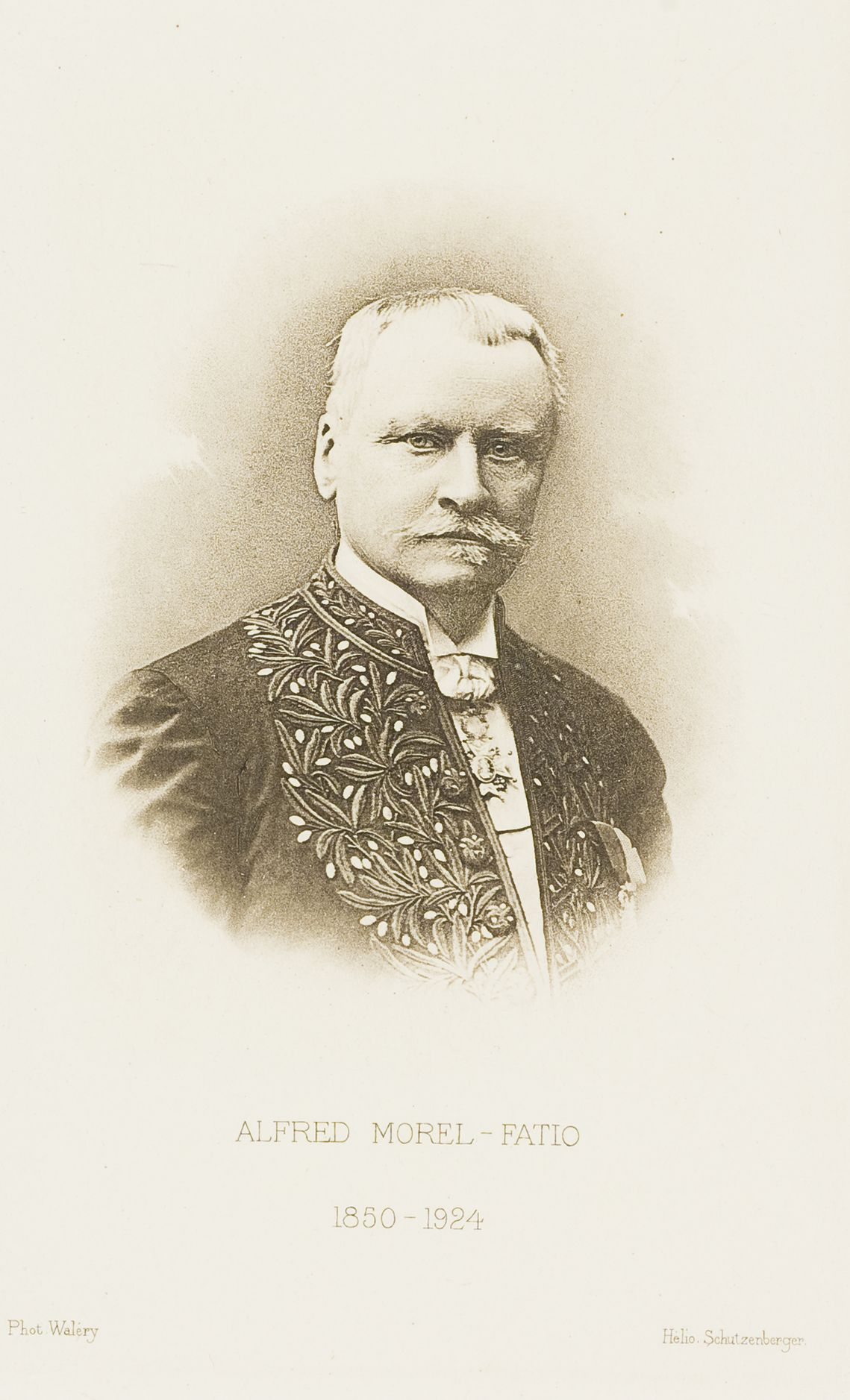
Alfred Morel-Fatio

Alfred Paul Victor Morel-Fatio (9 January 1850 in Strasbourg, France – 10 October 1924 in Versailles, France) was the leading French Hispanist of his time, educated at École des chartes, Paris.

From 1875 to 1880 he was attaché of the department of manuscripts of the Bibliothèque Nationale, during which period he prepared his excellent Catalogue des manuscrits espagnols et portugais de la Bibliothèque Nationale. For the next five years he was professor at the École supérieure des lettres at Algiers. In 1885 he returned to France to accept the chair of languages and literature of southern Europe in the Collège de France. He became influential and known widely, and in 1894 he was Taylorian lecturer at Oxford University. He was elected corresponding member of the Spanish Royal Academy of the Language, and was appointed a Knight Commander of the Order of Charles III, and in his own country became an officer of public instruction, a member of the Institute of France (1910), and a Knight of the Legion of Honor. After 1874 Morel-Fatio was a contributor to the Romania, and after 1899 one of the directors of the Bulletin Hispanique.

== Select bibliography ==
- Translation of the Grammaire des langues romanes by Friedrich Christian Diez (1874–76)
- Edition of Pedro Calderón de la Barca's Mágico prodigioso (1877)
- L'Espagne au XVIe et au XVIIe siècle (1878)
- Libro de los fechos et conquistas del principado de la Morea ... Chronique de Morée aux XIIIe et XIVe siècles (1885)
- Vie de Lazarillo de Tormes; Études de l'Espagne (three volumes, 1888–1904; second edition of volumes i and ii, 1895 and 1906)
- "El Libro de Alijandre," in Gesellschaft für romanische Literatur, volume X (1906)
- Recueil des instructions données aux ambassadeurs de France en Espagne. Historiographie de Charles-Quint (1913)
