= Reform Monument =

Monument in Peterhead, Aberdeenshire

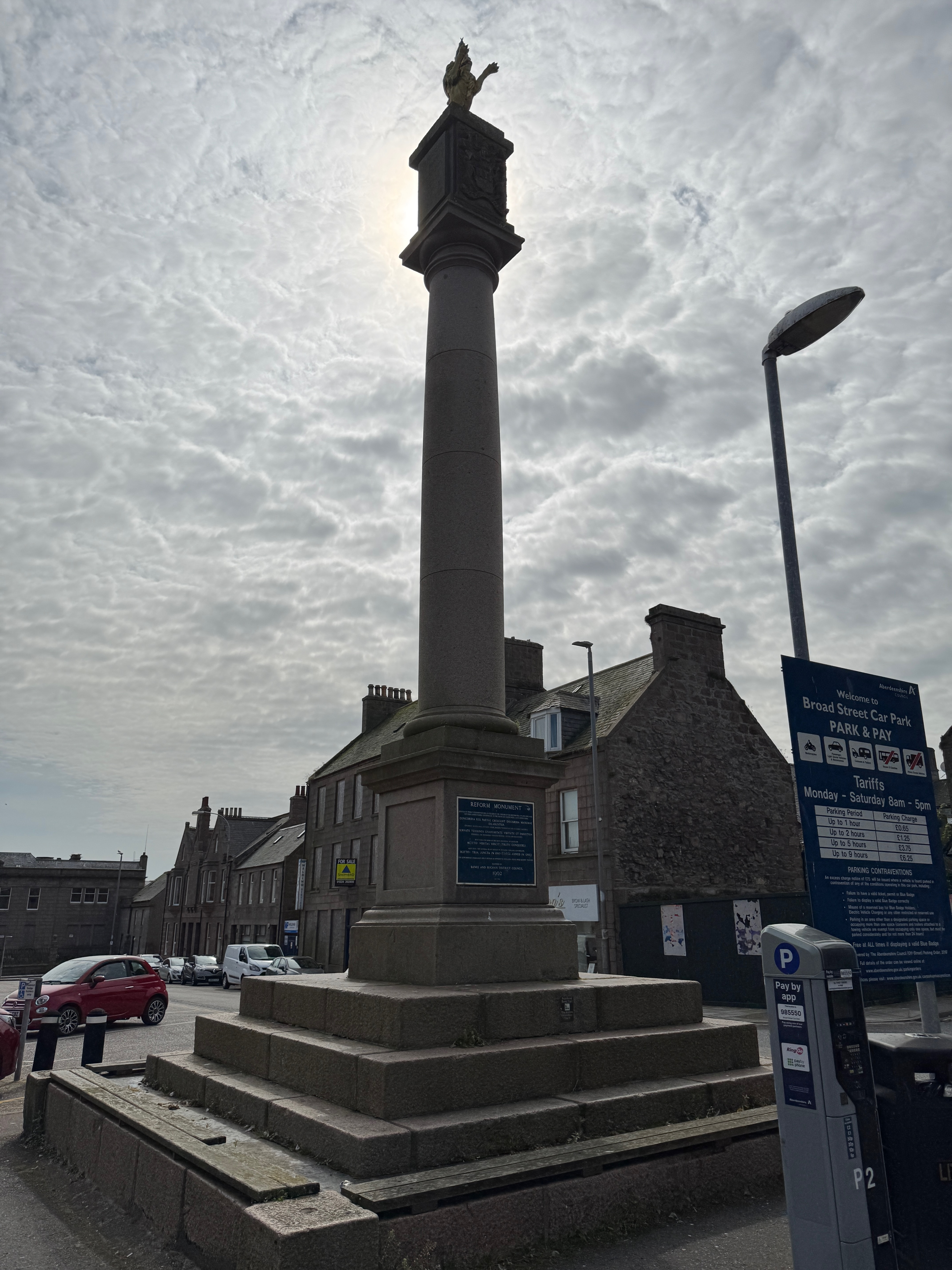
- The Reform Monument in 2024
- Interactive map of Reform Monument
- Location: Broad Street; Peterhead; Scotland
- Coordinates: 57°30′18″N 1°46′34″W
- Type: Statue
- Material: Stone
- Opening date: 1833

The Reform Monument is a Category B listed monument on Broad Street, at its junction with Longate, in Peterhead, Scotland, built in 1833. A Roman doric column, it is surmounted by arms of Earl Marischal, inspired by the gateway of Inverugie Castle. (Architectural historian Charles McKean wrote that the arms were "robbed" from the castle.)

The Reform Monument should not be confused with the Reform Tower in the Meethill area of Peterhead, built a year earlier.

== See also ==
- List of listed buildings in Peterhead, Aberdeenshire
