= Arbuthnot Museum =

Museum in Peterhead, Scotland

Coordinates: 57°30′25″N 1°46′54″W

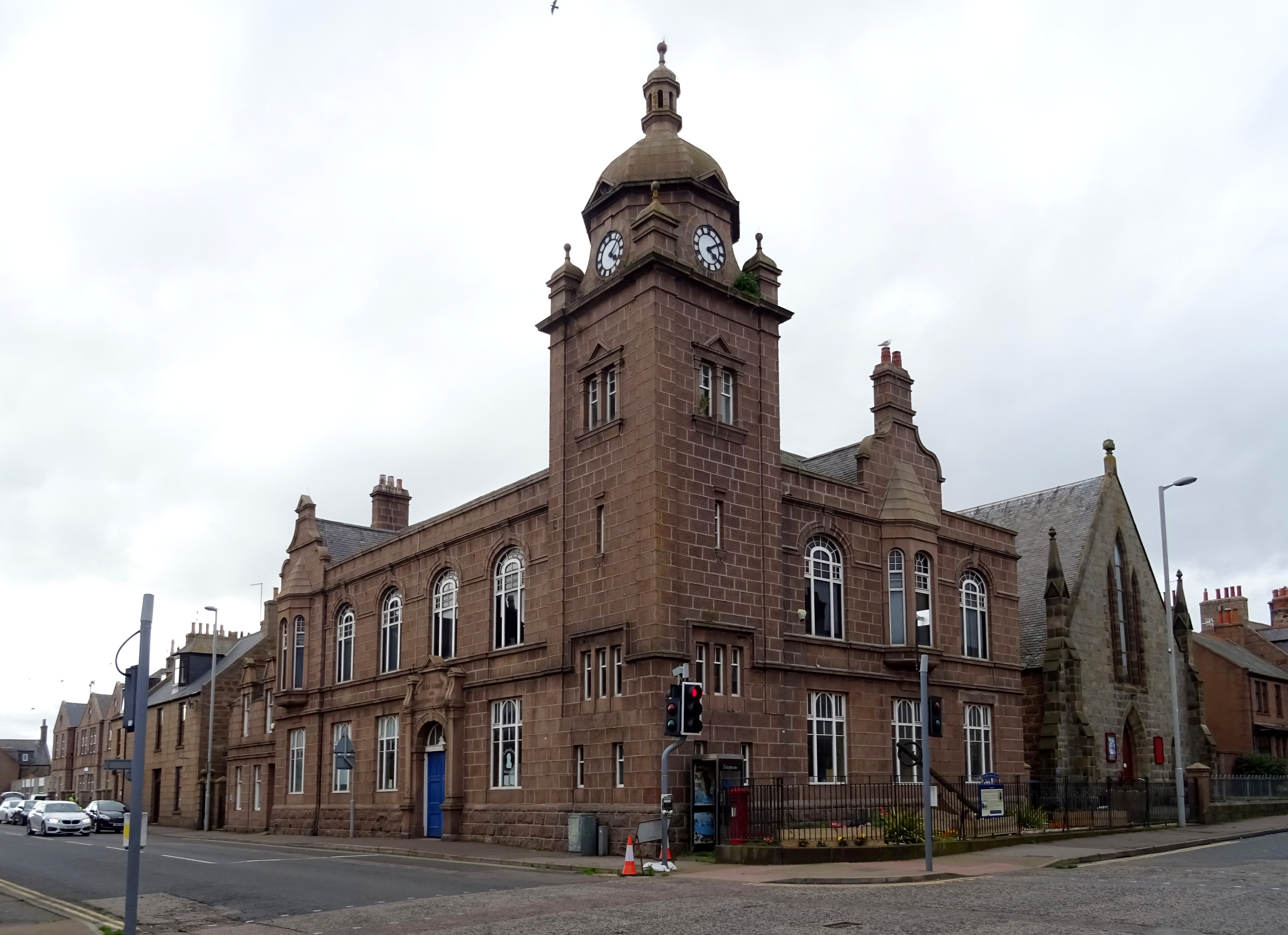
- The building in 2020
- Interactive map of Arbuthnot Museum
- Location: St Peter Street, Peterhead, Scotland
- Founded: 1893 (133 years ago)
- Architect: Duncan McMillan
- Architectural style: English Renaissance
- Governing body: Historic Environment Scotland
- Owner: Aberdeenshire Council

Listed Building – Category C(S)
- Official name: Peterhead Library and Arbuthnot Museum including attached librarian's house, outbuilding to rear and associated gatepiers, St Peter Street, Peterhead
- Designated: 21 June 2022
- Reference no.: LB52606

Arbuthnot Museum is a museum and former library in Peterhead, Aberdeenshire, Scotland. A Category C listed structure, it stands on St Peter Street at its junction with Queen Street. American industrialist Andrew Carnegie donated funds towards its construction. It is one of the earliest of Carnegie's libraries in the world.

== History ==
Local merchant Adam Arbuthnot left a collection of his personal items to the town upon his death in 1850. The possessions were stored in several homes in the town until the library and museum building was completed.

The building was designed by Aberdeen architect Duncan McMillan in the English Renaissance style and built between 1891 and 1893. It is two storeys, constructed in coursed and squared pink Peterhead granite. A square clock tower rises 73 feet (22 m) from its southeastern corner, displaying four pedimented clock faces and capped by a dome and cupola.

In 1889, three Peterhead men wrote to Andrew Carnegie, asking for his help in building a new free public library for the town. He responded: "If Peterhead adopted the Free Library Act and raised a fund for a library building, I would give the last thousand pounds required for a suitable structure." On 8 August 1891, Carnegie's wife, Louise, laid the building's foundation stone. The library and museum opened on 12 October 1893.

As of November 2024, the building is temporarily closed while its former library is moved to Arbuthnot House, located a short distance to the southeast, on Broad Street. Arbuthnot Museum is also being restored and refurbished.
