= 32 Broad Street, Peterhead =

Building converted into a bank

32 Broad Street
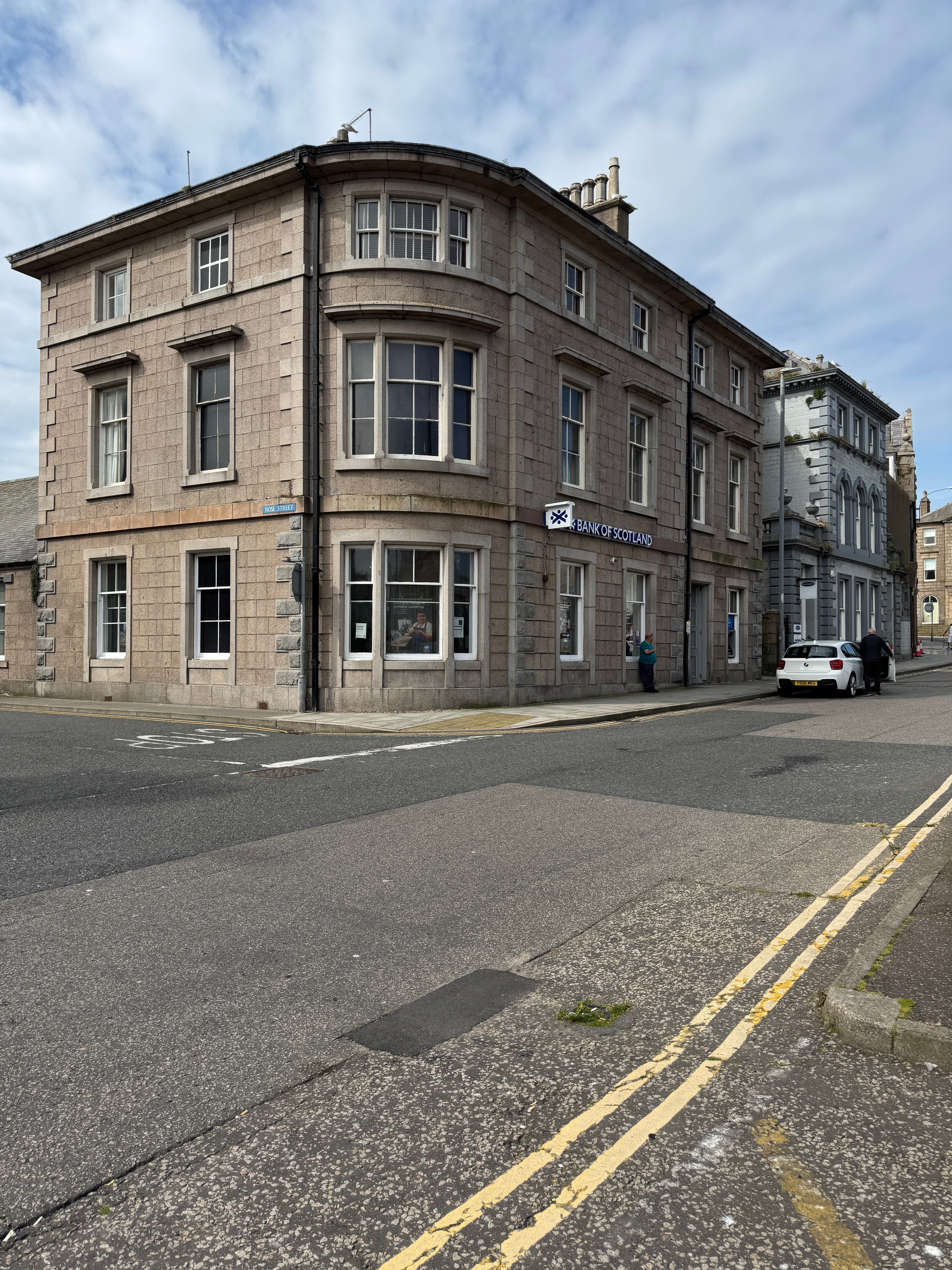
- Pictured in 2024
- Interactive map of the 32 Broad Street area

General information
- Location: 32 Broad Street, Peterhead, Scotland
- Coordinates: 57.504894°N 1.776433°W
- Completed: 1858

Technical details
- Floor count: 3

32 Broad Street is a Category B listed building at 32 Broad Street in Peterhead, Aberdeenshire, Scotland. It was built in 1858. Originally a Union Bank of Scotland, it is now home to a Bank of Scotland.

== See also ==
- List of listed buildings in Peterhead, Aberdeenshire
