= Peter Buchan =

Scottish editor, publisher, and collector of ballads and folktales (1790-1854)

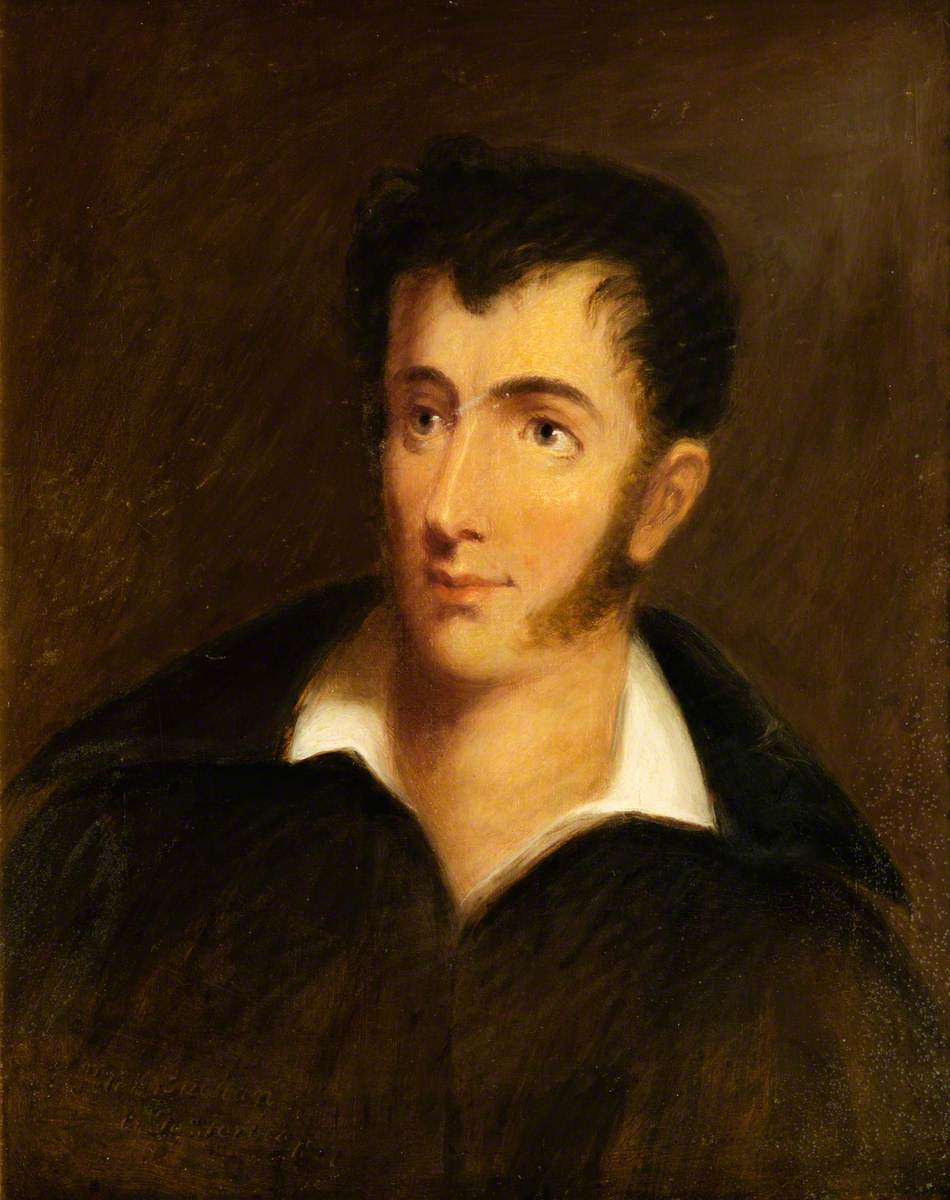
Peter Buchan; portrait by James Forbes

Peter Buchan (4 August 1790 – 19 September 1854) was a Scottish editor, publisher, and collector of ballads and folktales.

== Biography ==
Born in Peterhead, Buchan apprenticed with a Jack-of-all-trades, and in 1814 produced his first book, a collection of verse which failed to be taken notice of. As his hometown lacked any printer shops, in 1816 Buchan went to Stirling to learn the printing process, becoming proficient enough to produce samples within a matter of ten days.

He established business as a printer in Peterhead in March 1816, with the support of the Earl of Buchan who recommended a friend to fund the purchase of the press.

In the early years of business, he printed a series of chapbooks. He also invented his own printing press named the "Auchmedden", a pedal-operated devise that accepted stone, copper, as well as type surfaces for printing. He operated the press from a building on Peterhead's Longate. His The Annals of Peterhead (1819) had copper-plate illustrations which he himself engraved. Scarce Ancient Ballads (1819), Gleanings of Scarce Old Ballads (1825) were early publications that foreshadowed what would be his lifelong interest.

After this, he held a position in London from which drew a £150 annual income, but having compromised his health, he retired to Peterhead and devoted himself to the collection of Scottish ballads from oral sources, and their publication. His Ancient Ballads and Songs of the North of Scotland (1828) contained a large number of hitherto unpublished ballads, and newly discovered versions of existing ones.

== Works ==
Another collection made by him was published by the Percy Society, under the title Scottish Traditional Versions of Ancient Ballads (1845). Two unpublished volumes of Buchan's ballad collections are in the British Museum.

Buchan also compiled a collection of folktales, and his manuscripts were known to John Francis Campbell who discussed them in his Popular Tales of the West Highlands. Buchan's folktales were later published as Ancient Scottish Tales (1908).

== Animal rights ==
Buchan was an early animal rights writer. In 1824, he authored a book that argued that animals have souls and are immortal. Buchan argued that God must recompense the "undeserved pain" of animals by appointing them a "future state".

== Selected publications ==
- The Annals of Peterhead (1819)
- Scarce Ancient Ballads (1819)
- Scriptural & Philosophical Arguments; or Cogent Proofs From Reason & Revelation that Brutes Have Souls; and That Their Souls are Immortal (1824)
- Gleanings of Scarce Old Ballads (1825)
- Ancient Ballads and Songs of the North of Scotland (1828)
