= Peterhead Town House =

Municipal building in Peterhead, Scotland

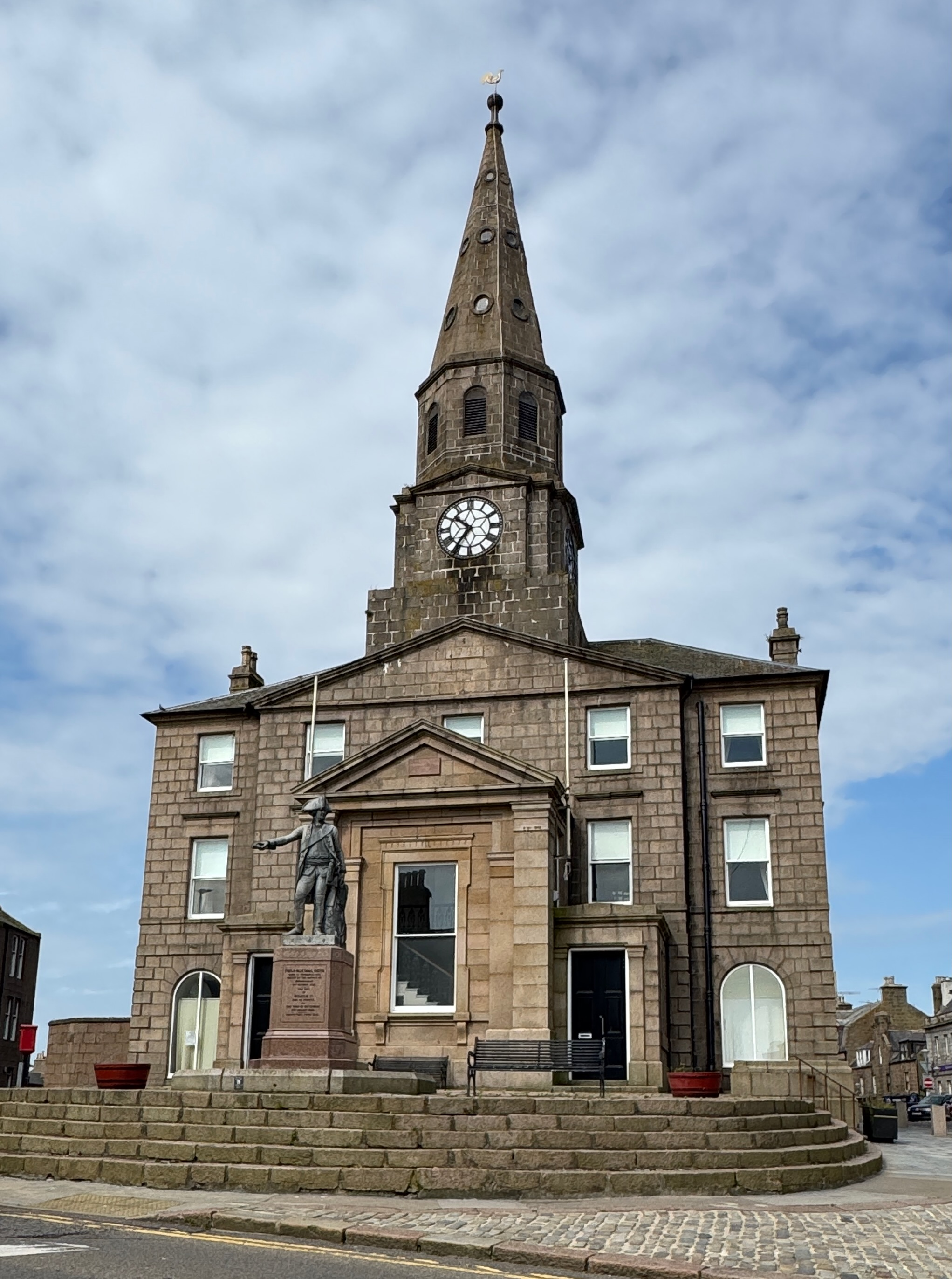
- The building in 2024

- Shown in Aberdeenshire
- 57.5049°N 1.7779°W
- Location: Broad Street, Peterhead

History
- Built: 1788

Site notes
- Architect: John Baxter
- Architectural style: Neoclassical style

Listed Building – Category B
- Official name: Town House, Broad Street, Peterhead
- Designated: 16 April 1971
- Reference no.: LB39674

Peterhead Town House is a municipal structure in Broad Street, Peterhead, Aberdeenshire, Scotland. The building, which was the headquarters of Peterhead Burgh Council, is Category B listed.

== History ==
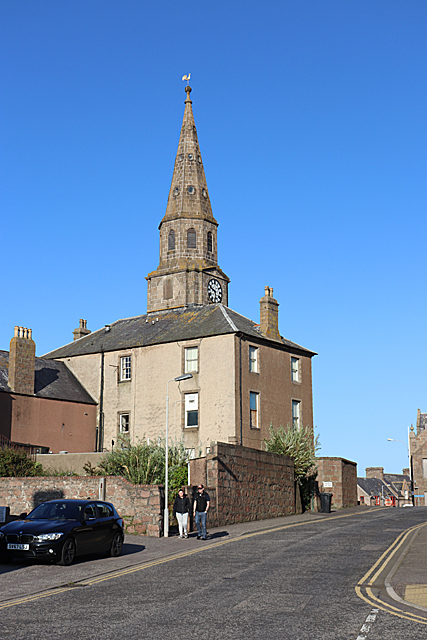
The rear of the building, viewed from Tolbooth Wynd

The first municipal building in Peterhead was a tolbooth on the corner of Longate and Brook Lane: it was erected on land gifted by George Keith, 5th Earl Marischal, and was completed in around 1600. The building served as a hospital during the great plague of 1645 and was burnt down shortly afterwards. A second tolbooth was built on the south side of Tolbooth Wynd at the instigation of William Keith, 7th Earl Marischal, after he had been released from captivity in the Tower of London, and was completed in around 1665. It featured a belfry which incorporated a bell cast by Robert Maxwell of the Edinburgh Bell Foundry in 1725.

The current town house was commissioned by a local charity, the Community of Feuars of the Town of Peterhead; it was designed by John Baxter the younger in the neoclassical style, built in ashlar stone and completed in 1788. The design involved a symmetrical main frontage with five bays facing down Broad Street; the central section of three bays, which slightly projected forward and was pedimented, originally featured an external staircase to the first floor; there was a tower above with a square shaped base, followed by a clock, a belfry and then a spire. The clock was designed and manufactured by a local clock-maker, James Argo, while the bell was made by Thomas Mears at the Whitechapel Bell Foundry. Internally, the principal rooms were the council chamber and the courtroom, both on the top floor; markets were held on the ground floor while the two rooms on the first floor was used by the local school.

A two-storey extension along Marischal Street, which accommodated the local market and a lock-up for pretty prisoners, was completed in 1832. A horse-drawn fire engine was installed on the ground floor at the north end of the town house in March 1861. A statue, which commemorated the life of Field Marshal James Keith, who had been killed in the service of Frederick the Great of Prussia at the Battle of Hochkirch on 14 October 1758 during the Third Silesian War, was unveiled outside the town house on 23 August 1868: it was a gift to the town from King William I of Prussia. A two-storey pedimented porch, which was designed and built by William Stuart with the intention of enclosing the external staircase, was added to the front of the building in 1881, replacing the original steps. Its arcade was also filled in.

The building continued to serve as the offices and meeting place of Peterhead Burgh Council, but ceased to be the local seat of government after the council moved to Arbuthnot House at the opposite end of Broad Street shortly after the Second World War. The upper floors of the building subsequently enjoyed limited use but the ground floor was let to the local offices of Citizens Advice. After an inspection in March 2019 revealed that the condition of the building was deteriorating, it was added to the Buildings at Risk Register for Scotland. In January 2020, following the award of a grant from Aberdeenshire Council, a team of consultants were appointed to explore options for bringing the building fully back into use.

Renovations were completed, in October 2021, by Maskame and Tait. All work was carried out by local companies, sub-contractors and suppliers.

== In popular culture ==
A 19th-century photograph of Broad Street, taken from the Town House by George Washington Wilson, is in the portrait gallery of the National Galleries of Scotland.

== See also ==
- List of listed buildings in Peterhead, Aberdeenshire
