= Peterhead =

Town in Aberdeenshire, Scotland

Coordinates: 57.5091°N 1.7832°W

Peterhead: Scottish Gaelic: Ceann Phàdraig; Scots: Peterheid, The Bloo Toon
- Town
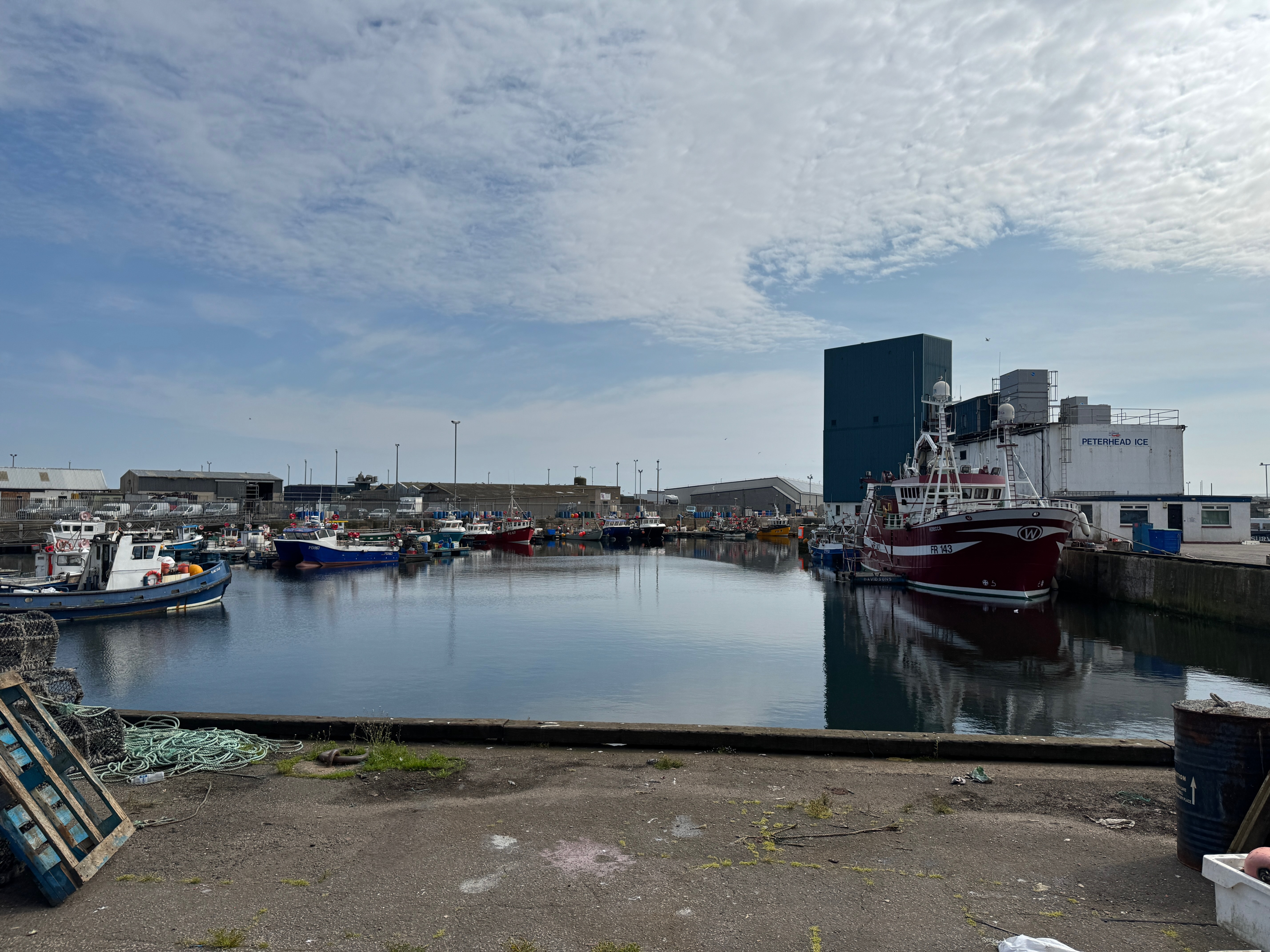
- Peterhead's North Harbour

- Location within Aberdeenshire
- Population: 19,791 (2022)
- OS grid reference: NK135465
  - Edinburgh: 120 miles (193 kilometres)
  - London: 420 mi (676 km)
- Council area: Aberdeenshire
- Lieutenancy area: Aberdeenshire
- Country: Scotland
- Sovereign state: United Kingdom
- Post town: PETERHEAD
- Postcode district: AB42
- Dialling code: 01779
- Police: Scotland
- Fire: Scottish
- Ambulance: Scottish
- UK Parliament: Aberdeenshire North and Moray East
- Scottish Parliament: Banffshire and Buchan Coast

Peterhead (Scottish Gaelic: Ceann Phàdraig, Scots: Peterheid) is a town in Aberdeenshire, Scotland. It is the largest settlement in the council area, with a population of 19,791 at the 2022 Census. It is the busiest fishing port in the United Kingdom for total landings by UK vessels, according to a 2019 survey.

Peterhead sits at the easternmost point in mainland Scotland. It is often referred to as The Blue Toun (locally spelled "The Bloo Toon") and locals are known as Bloo Touners. They are also referred to as blue mogganers (locally spelled "bloomogganners"), supposedly from the blue worsted moggans or stockings that the fishermen originally wore.

== Prehistory and archaeology ==
Expansion of the town's landfill led to archaeological work in 2002 and 2003. The investigations found a clearance cairn with late Bronze Age stone tools, a burial cairn with late Neolithic and early Bronze Age stone tools and Beaker ceramics. They also found some stone tools dating to the Mesolithic and early Neolithic which indicated that people have been living in the Peterhead area for over five thousand years.

== History ==
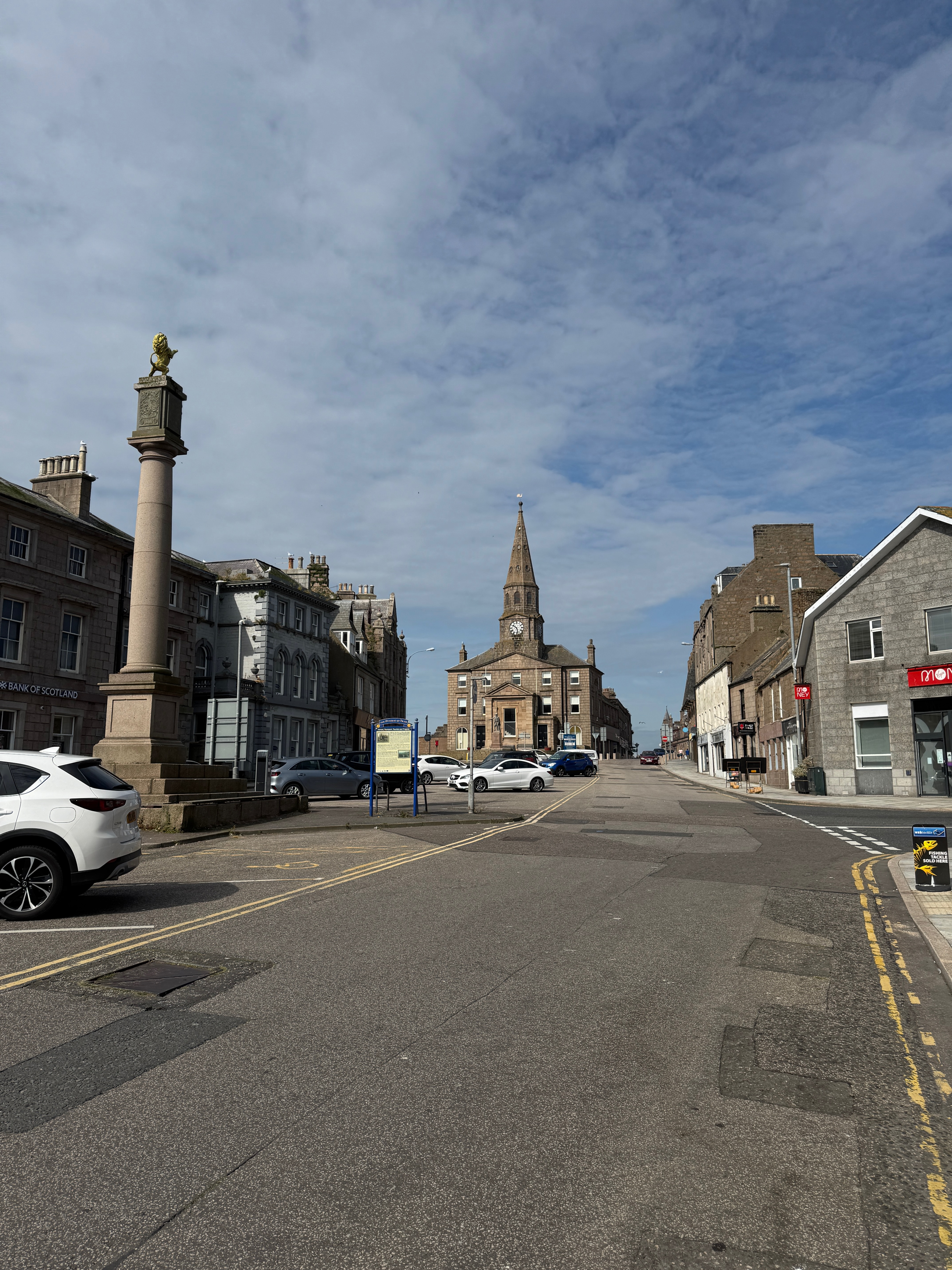
A 2024 view of Broad Street, looking west to the Town House. The Reform Monument is in view on the left.

=== Founding ===
Prior to the Reformation, the land on which the town stands, together with a sizeable amount of adjoining country, belonged to Deer Abbey. In 1560, when it was known as Peterugie, or Inverugie of St Peter, it was granted by Mary, Queen of Scots, to Robert Keith, 1st Lord Altrie, a son of William Keith, 4th Earl Marischal. Peterhead was founded in 1593 by George Keith, 5th Earl Marischal, the 4th Earl's nephew and successor, and was developed as a planned settlement, then known as "Harbour and Barony of Keith Insche commonly called Peterhead". The town's first known population totalled 56. The twelve original feuars occupied land along Seagate between the pier of Port Henry, to the north, and the Quinzie (Queenie) to the south. The Queenie was a causeway of boulders, covered only by spring tides, which linked the islands of Keith Inch and Greenhill to the mainland.

Today, the Queenie Bridge, which opened in 1954, connects Bridge Street and Greenhill Road. The construction of Port Henry in 1593 encouraged the growth of Peterhead as a fishing port and established a base for trade. Port Henry, the oldest of Peterhead's three harbours, was constructed along the Seagate shore by Henry Middleton, under the supervision of Keith. It was protected to the north by the Old Pier, which was probably erected before 1593.

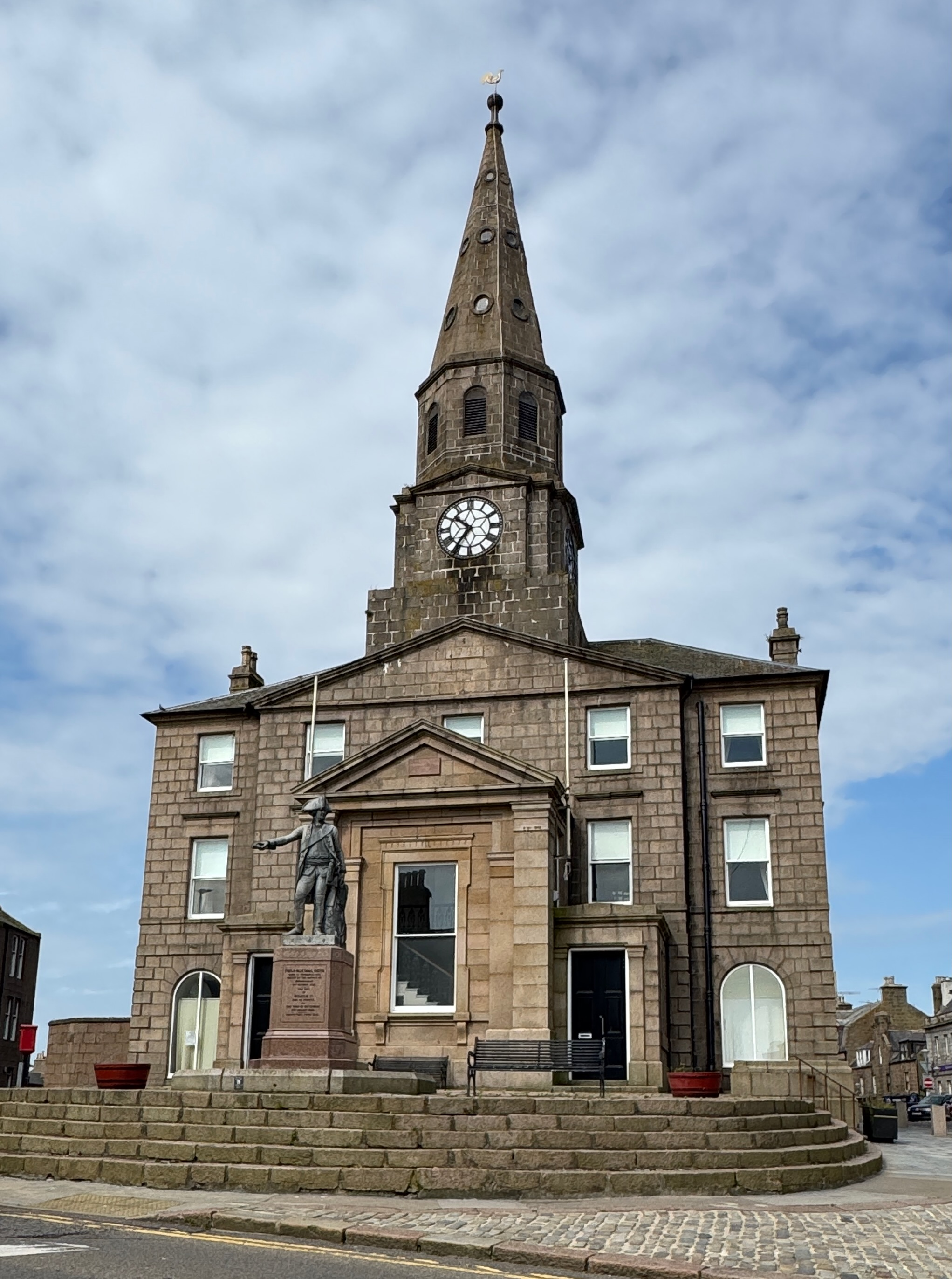
Peterhead Town House

Peterhead developed uphill between the shore and Longate, which—until the development of Broad Street in the late 18th century—was the main historic district of the town.

Port Henry was improved in 1631 and repaired before the end of the century and again early in the 18th century. The south pier was increased in height and the west pier was constructed. The southern part was reconstructed between 1775 and 1781 by John Smeaton, with improvements carried out by John Rennie between 1806 and 1810. He also oversaw an addition to the west pier in 1813.

By 1680, Charles McKean notes that Peterhead "had become one of the best fishings on the north coast". Around the same time, the town had gained a reputation as a watering place with both bath houses and mineral wells, but both are now gone.

=== 18th century ===
On 22 December 1715, James Francis Edward Stuart, Prince of Wales, arrived in Peterhead from Dunkirk and stayed "in an ancient house in Longate", where he was visited by the Earl Marischal. The Marischal's last Baron Baillie, Thomas Arbuthnot, put the town on alert for war by summoning able-bodied men and their weapons. The prince left for Newburgh, and the town, by forfeiture of the Keiths, suffered for its loyalty. The estate of the Earl Marischal was forfeited in 1716, sold to York Buildings Company, then to the governors of Merchant Maiden Hospital, Edinburgh, in 1726.

In 1728, the diocese of Aberdeen reported that Peterhead was "about 230 families; the people are sober and courteous, and agree well amongst themselves, which has now become a rare character. Market day is Friday, but neglected. The town is much resorted to in July and August, because the famous well here is then in its strength".

Peterhead Harbour was proving so valuable that in 1738, the Leith shipmasters attested that "the harbour of Peterhead is in our opinion the best situate of any place in Scotland for all ships trading on the north seas".

In 1775, the "feu superior", the Merchant Maiden Company of Edinburgh, transferred to the Committee of Feuars of Peterhead the Tolbooth, Tolbooth Green and other sundry land. The new Peterhead Town House building replaced the tolbooth in 1788. Meanwhile, the enclosed lands of South Bay were being developed into "the beautifully homogeneous district of elegant houses for the accommodation of strangers and sea captains, much of which still survives". Fishermen began to move to Roanheads on the north-east shoulder of the peninsula. Roanheads was laid out in today's form by 1771, and some of the few surviving pantiled houses may be original.

From 1788, the port developed a speciality in whaling. It eventually became Britain's largest whaling port.

=== 19th century ===
In 1815, before the increase in herring popularity, there were 72 vessels registered to Peterhead operating from the port; by 1850 there were over 400.

North Harbour and the dry dock were built by Rennie and Thomas Telford between 1818 and 1822. They were improved fifteen years later. The junction canal was built in 1849, while the south and west piers of North Harbour were built by David Stevenson in 1855. The southern part of North Harbour (Middle Harbour) dates from 1872. It was constructed by David and his brother, Thomas, with improvements made between 1893 and 1897 by William Shield, a local worker.

A lifeboat station was first established in 1865.

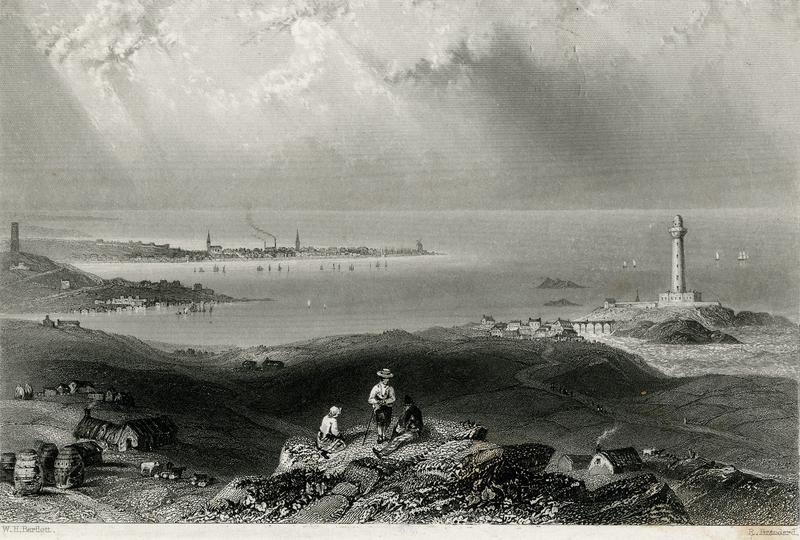
Engraving of Peterhead by Robert Brandard (1805–1862)

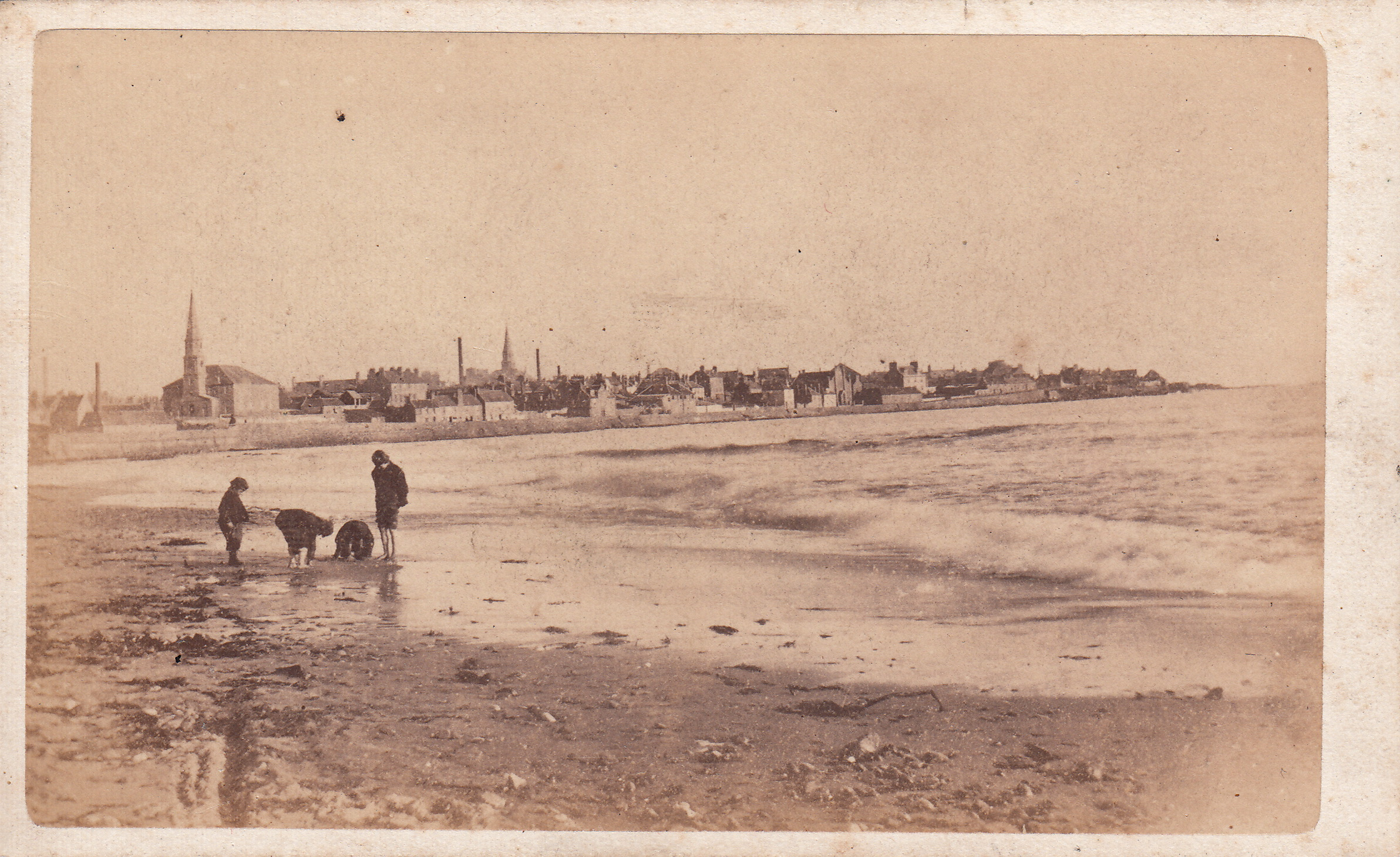
Peterhead in the 1860s

Peterhead convict prison was opened in 1888, gaining a reputation as one of Scotland's toughest prisons. The same year, Peterhead was made a head port, its limits extending southward to the mouth of the River Ythan and westward to Powk Burn.

=== 20th and 21st centuries ===
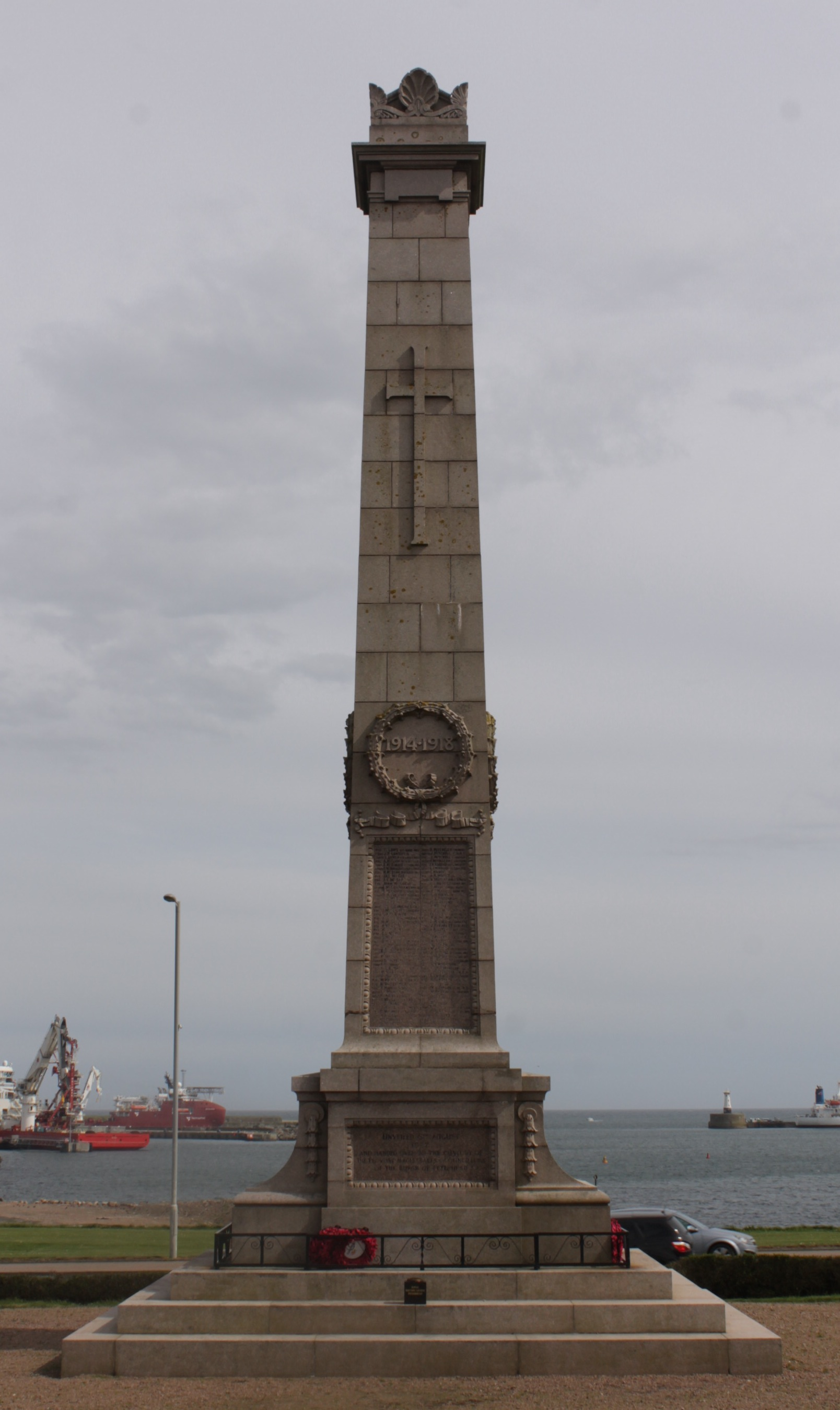
Peterhead War Memorial

South Harbour was deepened between 1906 and 1908. The Harbour of Refuge (Admiralty Backwaters) was begun in 1886 by Sir John Coode. It was built by convict labour.

The present harbour, now a Category B listed structure, has two massive breakwaters, enclosing an area of approximately 300 acres (120 ha) in Peterhead Bay. The south breakwater, about 2,700 ft (820 m) long, was constructed between 1892 and 1912 using convict labour from the prison. Peterhead was, and remains, an important fishing port, and the breakwater gave it an advantage over other fishing ports. The north breakwater, constructed between 1912 and 1956, is approximately 1,500 ft (460 m) long.

The Second Edition Six-Inch Ordnance Survey Map of Peterhead was drawn up when the south breakwater was only partially completed. The extensive harbour works were located near this breakwater, next to the prison. The following statistics show how Peterhead was a thriving port before the First World War:

Fishery Statistics

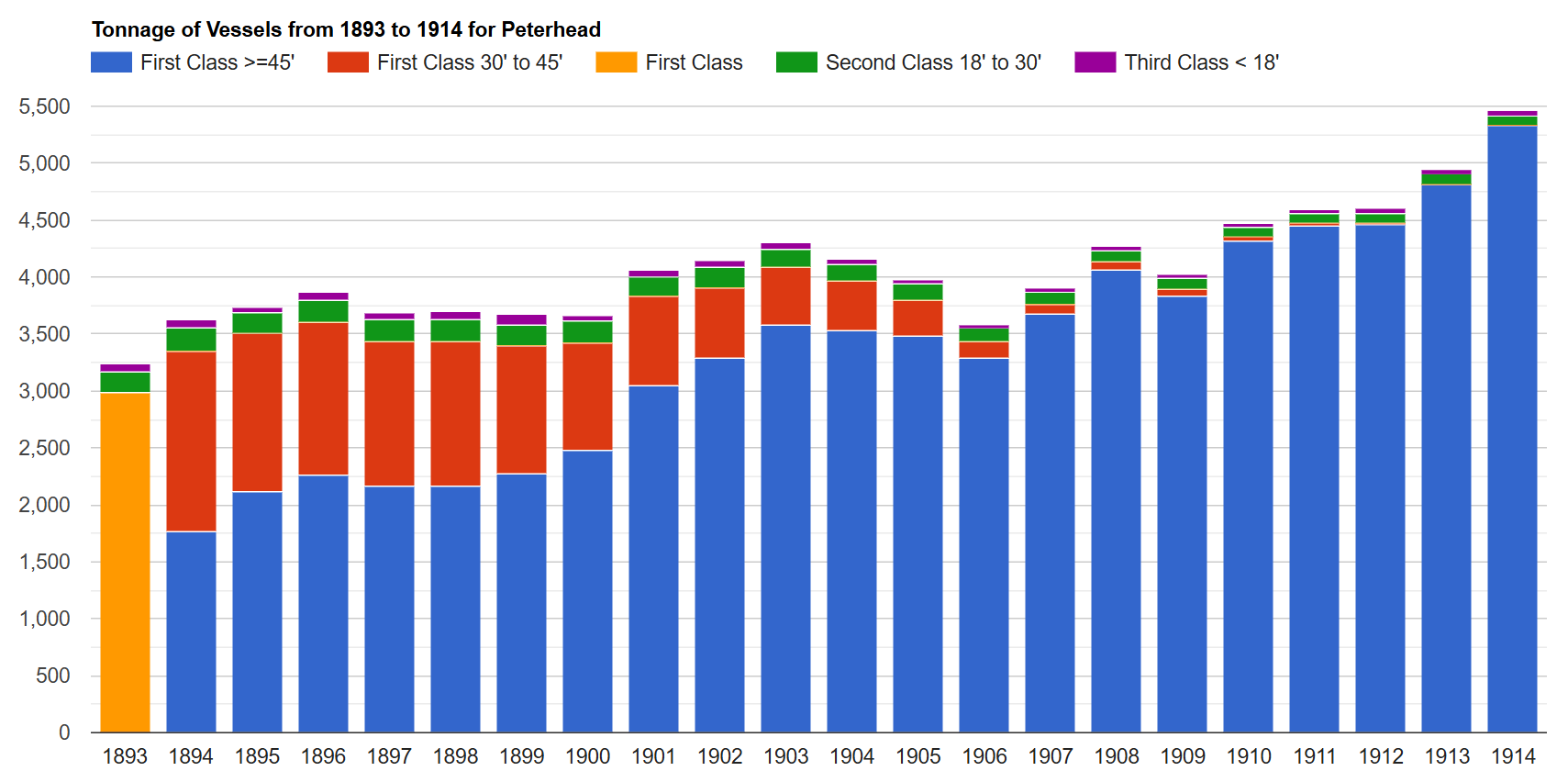
Tonnage of vessels

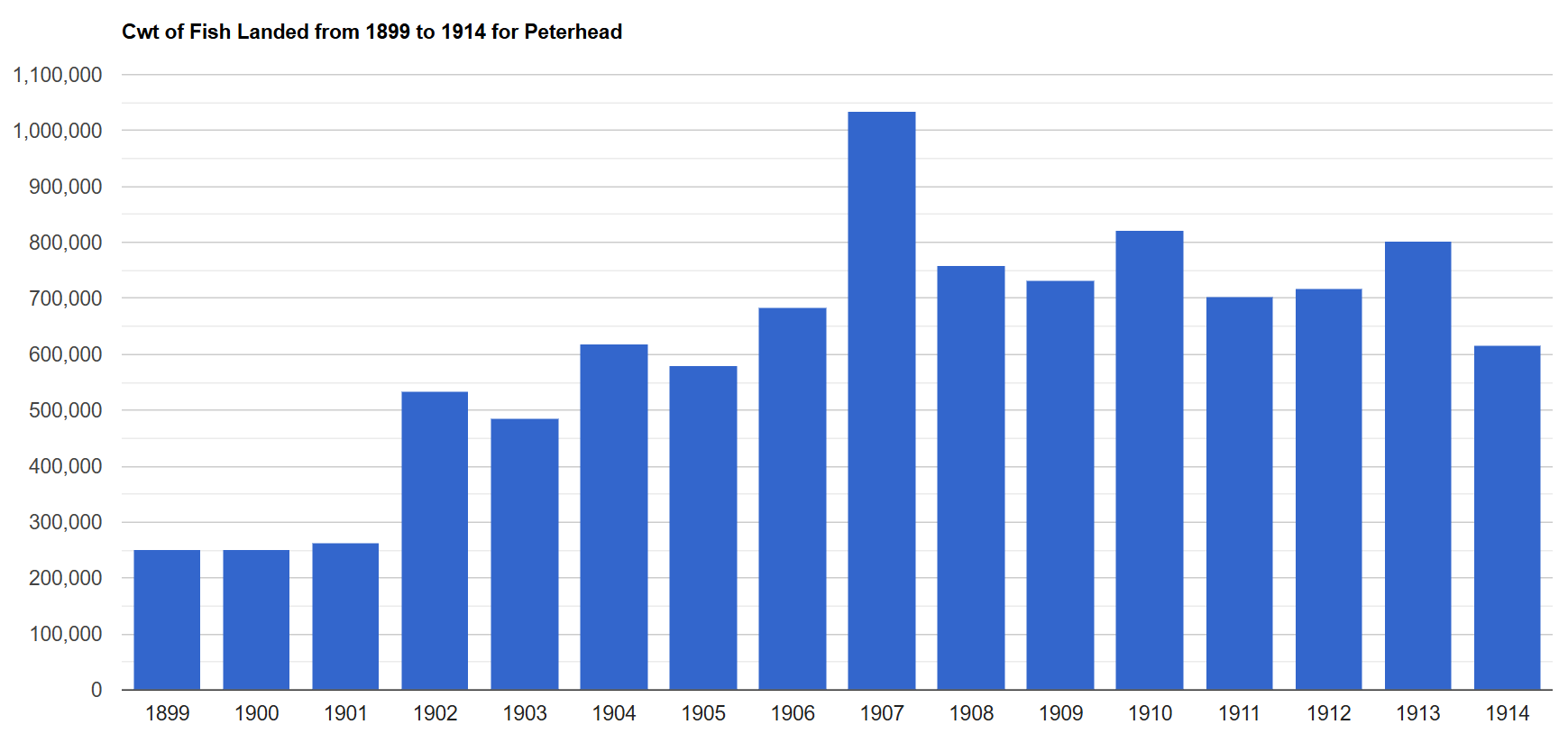
Cwt of fish landed

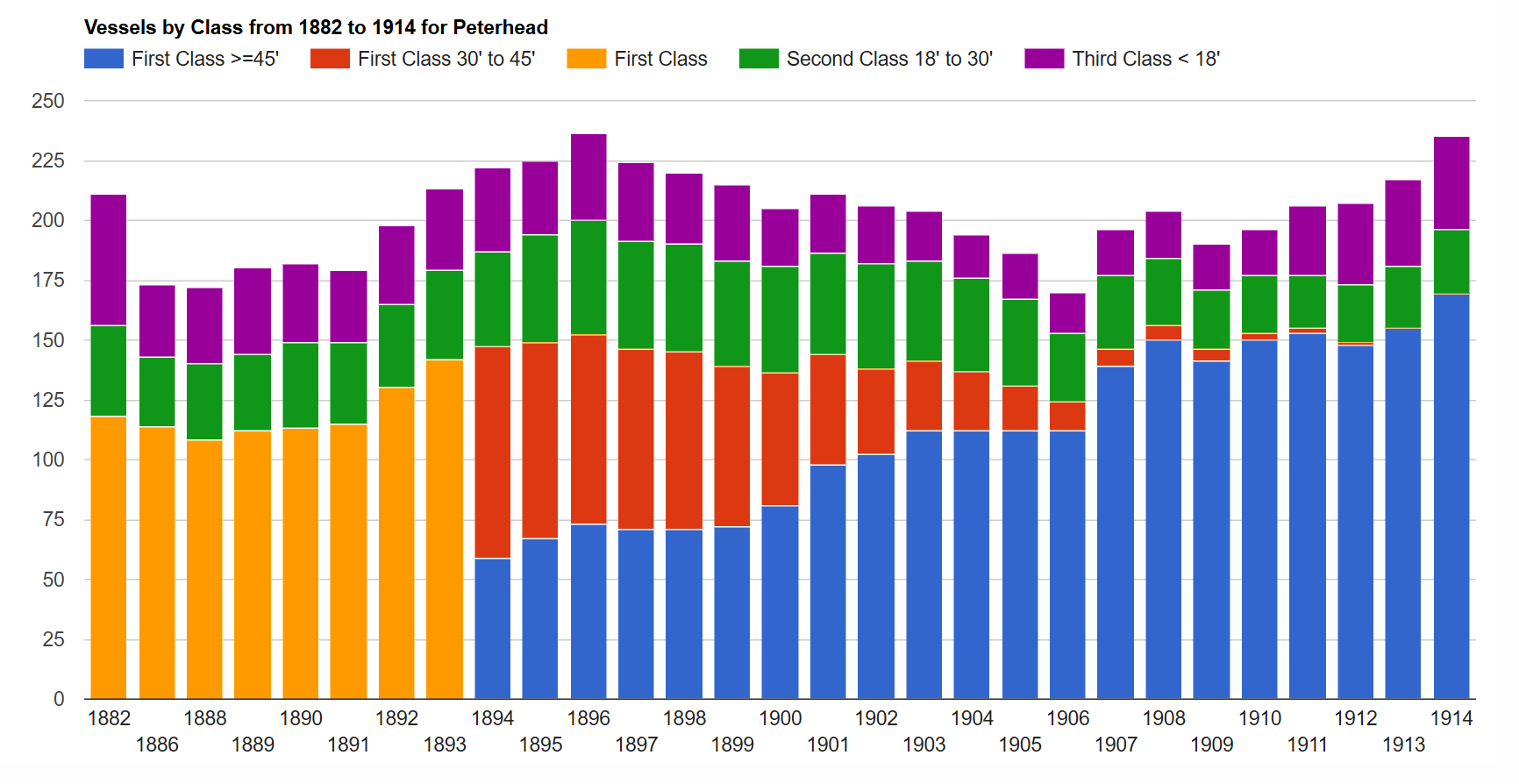
Vessels by class

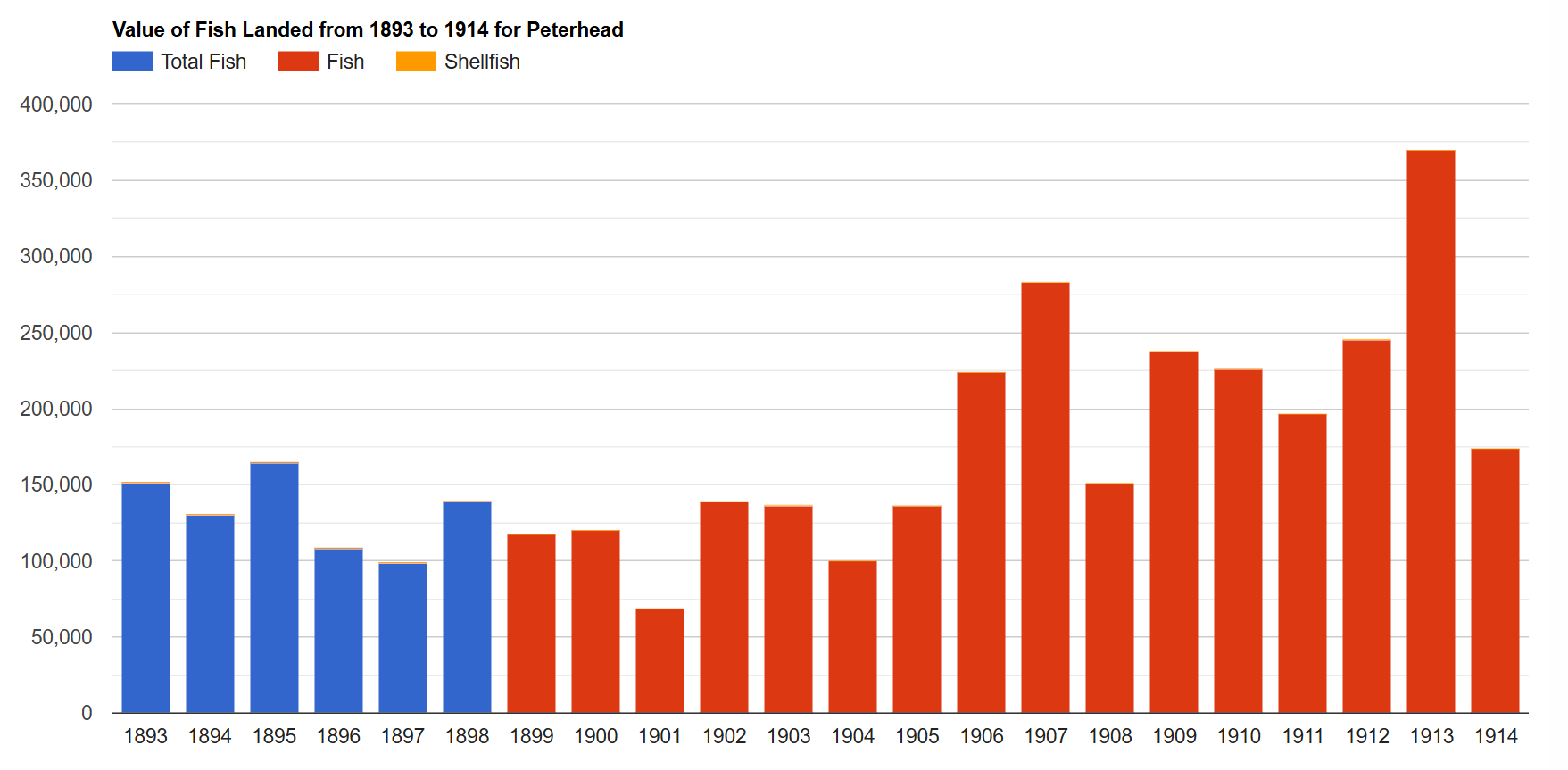
Value (£] of fish landed

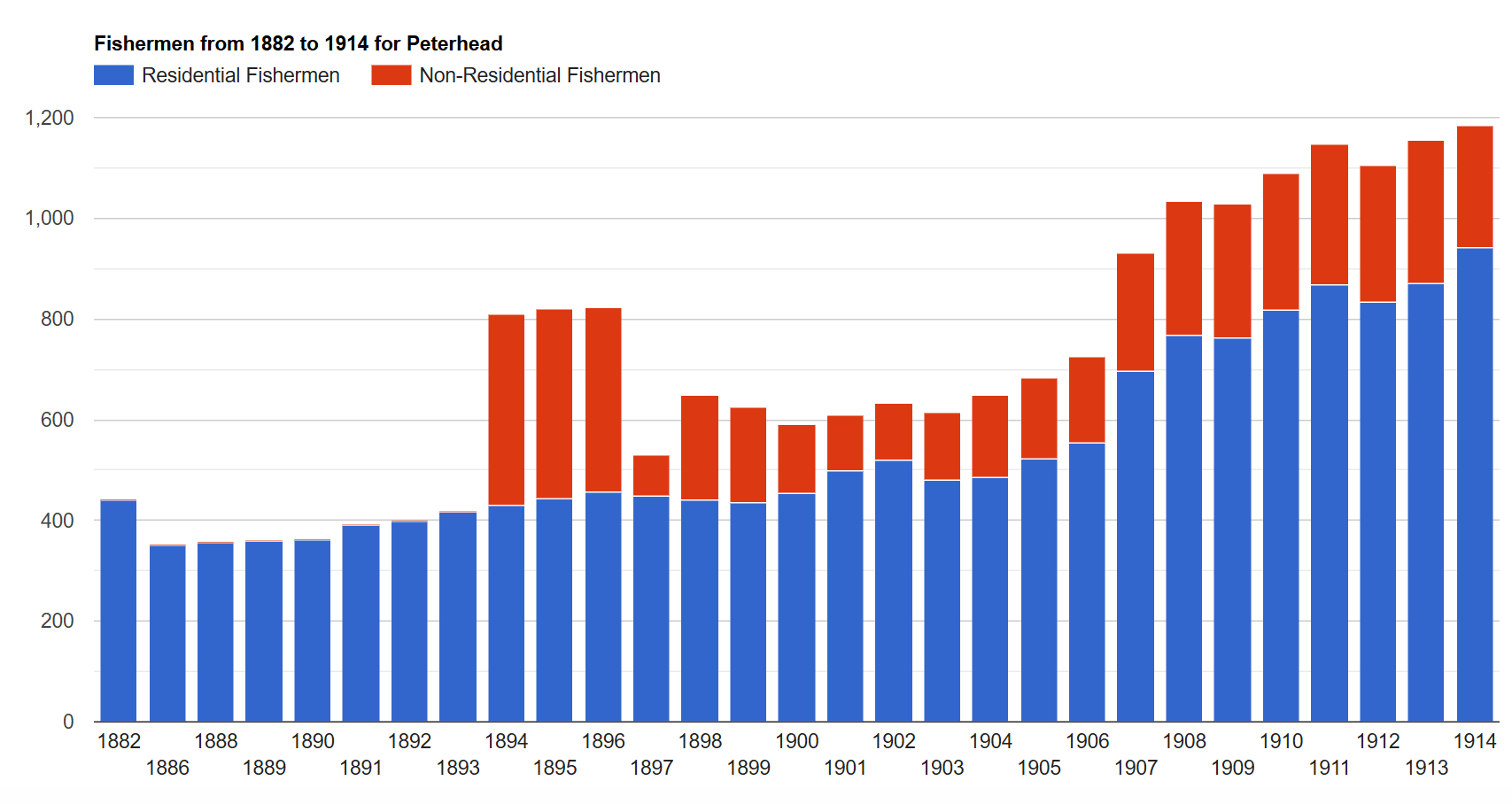
Fishermen

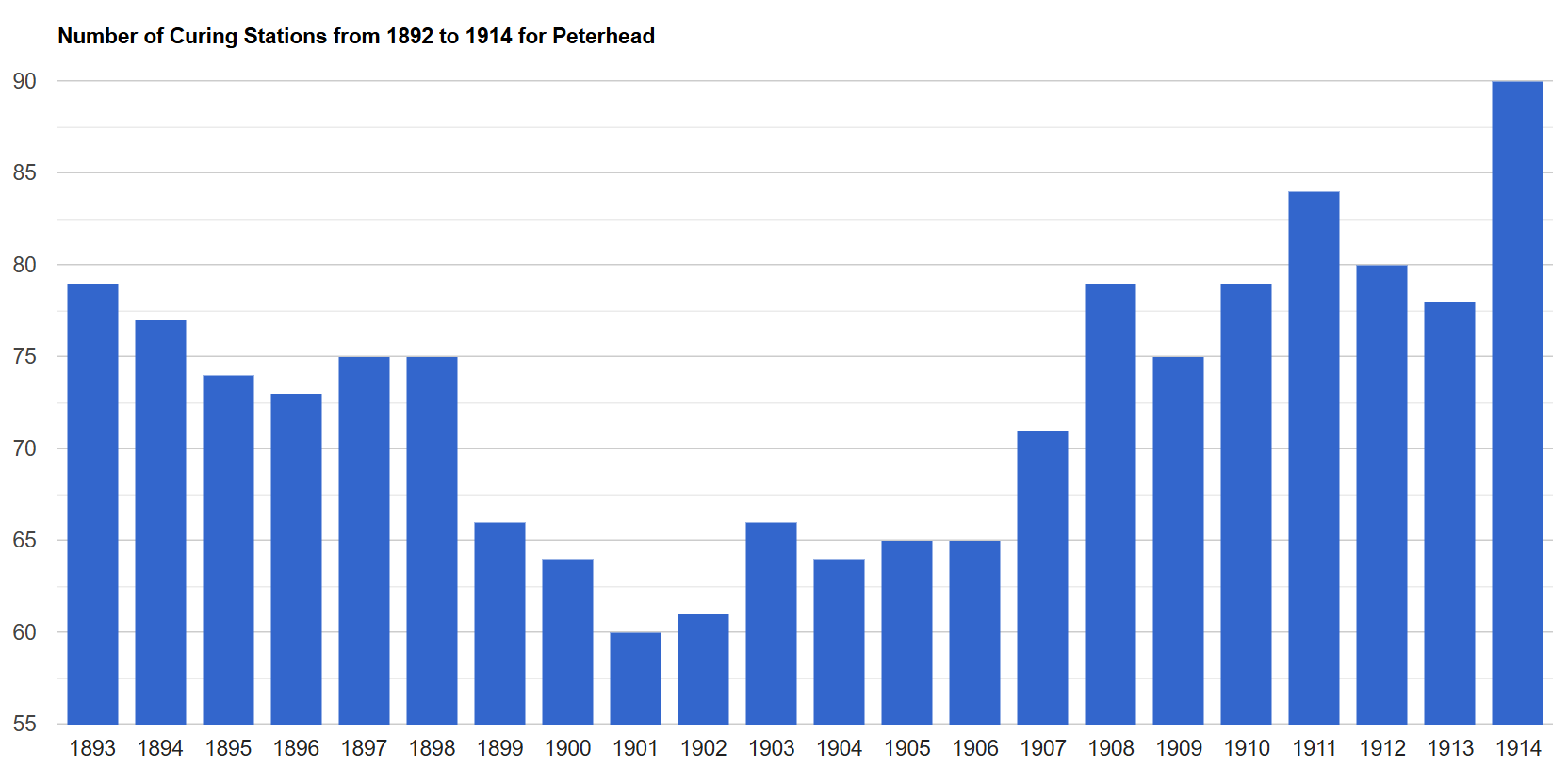
Number of curing stations

Peterhead was a Jacobite-supporting town in the Jacobite risings of 1715 and 1745. In particular, it was one of the Episcopalian north-eastern ports where reinforcements, plus money and equipment, were periodically landed from France during the Forty-Five.

During World War II, Peterhead was bombed 28 times by Nazi Germany bombers, ranking it as the second-most-bombed location in Britain, after London. Aberdeen, which is close to the town and a more logical target of the bombers, was bombed 24 times. (Peterhead was bombed so much because it was the first built-up area Nazi bombers saw when flying raids against Scotland.)

A new phase of growth was initiated in the 1970s with Peterhead becoming a major oil-industry service centre, and the completion of the nearby St Fergus gas terminal. At this time, considerable land holdings were allocated for industrial development.

From the 1990s onward, the town has suffered from several high-profile company closures and is facing a number of pressures, including Common Fisheries Policy reforms. However, it retains a relatively diverse economy, including food processing, textiles, service industries and, still importantly, fishing. (Over 193,000 tonnes of fish and shellfish, with a value of around £232 million, were landed at Peterhead in 2023, employing around 700 fishermen.) The Peterhead Port Authority plans to extend the northern breakwater as a stimulus to the town's economic development. In addition, to assist with business diversification and town centre environmental improvements, the 'Peterhead Project' initiative, under the Aberdeenshire Towns Partnership, brings together the Council, Scottish Enterprise Grampian, Communities Scotland, commerce and community representatives.

The town's port remains the largest for landings in the United Kingdom. According to a 2019 UK sea fisheries statistical survey, Peterhead Port's catch size for the year was 132,000 tonnes. Nearby Fraserburgh was third, behind Lerwick. It was placed 14th in the list of number of fishers based at each port.

=== Listed buildings ===
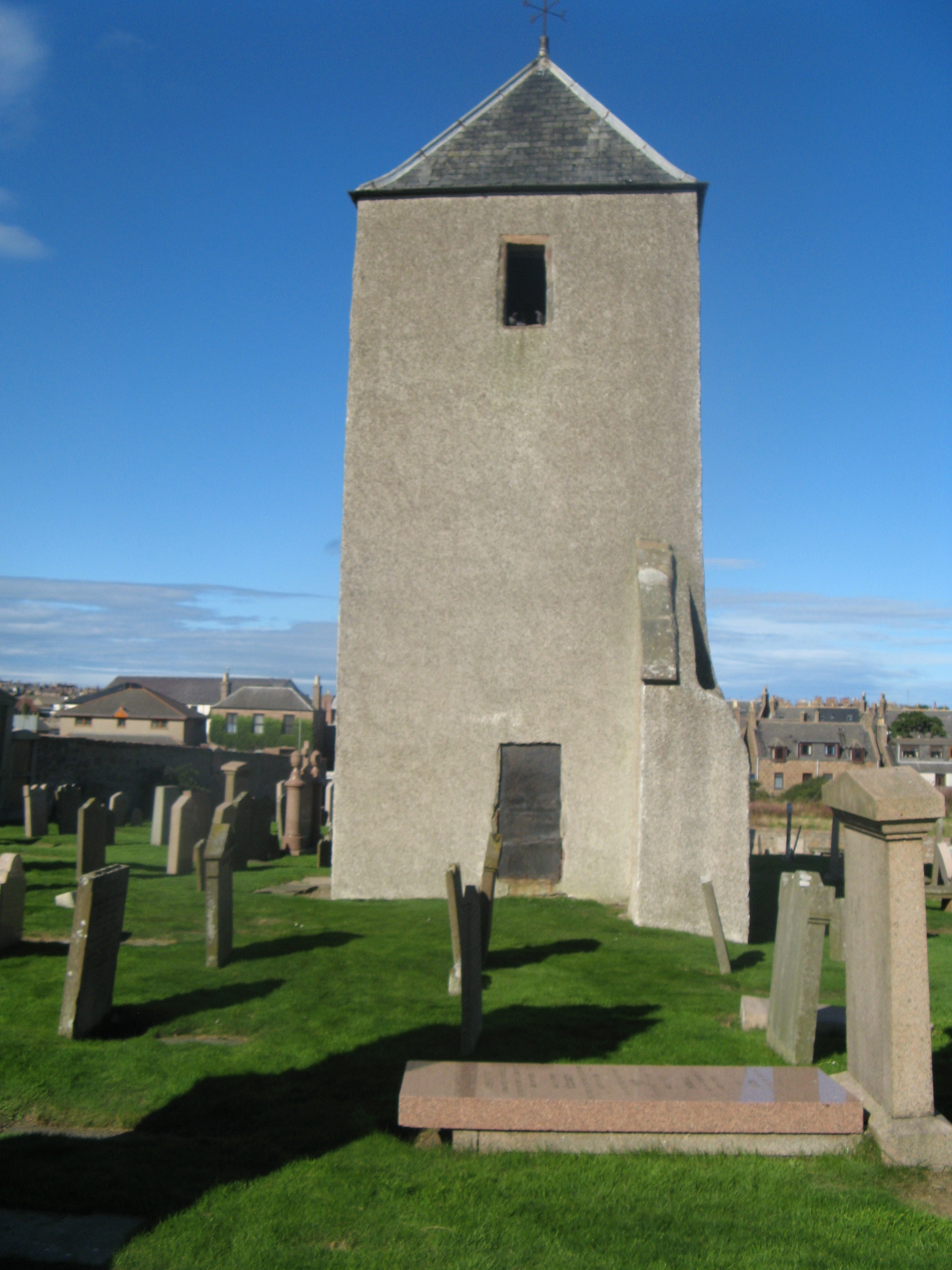
Old St Peter's Church, located on High Street, to the west of the town

Peterhead has many listed buildings across the three categories (A, B and C). The three Category A listed buildings are Buchan Ness lighthouse, Old St Peter's Church and the Old Parish Church (known colloquially as the Muckle Kirk). The majority of the listed buildings are on streets that fan out from the harbour, including Harbour Street, Broad Street, Jamaica Street, Maiden Street, Merchant Street, Port Henry Road, Queen Street and St Andrew Street.

Queen Street was the main street of the new town laid out around 1805. North Street, which leads up into Roanheads, consists of 19th-century two-storey red granite homes. The dormer-windowed circa-1877 fisher houses in Great Stuart Street were constructed for fishermen quitting Burnhaven (hence its nickname Burnie Street). There are similar houses in Port Henry Road, Gladstone Road and Almanythie Road.

The oldest building in Peterhead is the 16th-century Fish-House (also known as the Salmon House), located on today's Golf Road.

Harbour Street

Harbour Street was laid out in 1739. Redevelopment of the eastern end of Harbour Street, at its junction with Union Street, Farmer's Lane and Bridge Street, began in 2016. It is the home of the Peterhead office of Marine Scotland.

- 1 Harbour Street, built in the late 18th century. Category B listed

Broad Street

The former heart of the 19th-century town, Broad Street was bordered by the Peterhead Town House to the west, Arbuthnot House to the east, and lined on both sides "by good houses, hotels and banks". The slope between Broad Street and the harbour "contains some of the most picturesque urban streets in Scotland," according to historian Charles McKean.

There are 22 listed buildings on Broad Street, including:

- Arbuthnot House, built in 1805. Category B listed
- 32 Broad Street, built in 1858. Category B listed
- 59 Broad Street, built in the mid-18th century. Category B listed
- 75 Broad Street, built in 1835. Category B listed
- Reform Monument, built in 1833. Category B listed
- Peterhead Town House, built in 1788. Category B listed

Merchant Street

- 10 Merchant Street, built c. 1800. Category B listed
- St. Peter's Episcopal Church, 22 Merchant Street, built in 1814. Category B listed
  - The church hall of the above. Category C listed
- Statue of Field Marshal Keith, built in 1868. Category B listed

== Local government ==
Peterhead is the largest settlement in Buchan, a committee area of Aberdeenshire.

The town was a burgh in the historic county of Aberdeenshire. In 1930 it became a small burgh under the Local Government (Scotland) Act 1929, but in 1975 small burghs were abolished and Peterhead became part of the district of Banff and Buchan within the new Grampian Region. When districts and regions were abolished in 1996, Peterhead became part of the new unitary authority of Aberdeenshire.

Since 1975 Peterhead has had a community council, with limited powers.

== Demographics ==
The 2022 Census put the town's population at 19,791, making Peterhead the largest town in Aberdeenshire. English is the primary language of residents, although 56.4% can speak Scots.

== Social issues ==
Peterhead has been referred to as having some of the highest levels of deprivation in Aberdeenshire. According to the Scottish Index of Multiple Deprivation, the town centre (specifically a part of the harbour area) received the lowest ranking (1 out of 10) for four of the seven topics: employment, education/skills, housing and crime. That area also received a ranking of 2 for income. The other two rankings were a 4 for health and a 10 for geographic access. Overall, this part of the harbour area ranked lowest (1) in the decile and quantile statistics.

By contrast, parts of Ugieside and Peterhead Links ranked markedly higher. Ugieside ranked above 5 in five of the seven topics: income (7), employment (6), health (8), housing (8) and crime (10). It received a 4 in education/skills and geographic access. Peterhead Links, meanwhile, ranked above 5 in all topics.

== Education ==
=== Academy ===
Peterhead Academy houses around 1,300 pupils and the school is split into six houses (Arbuthnot, Buchan, Craigewan, Grange, Marischal and Slains), with all the names associated with areas of the town. The school has pupils coming from surrounding villages such as Boddam, Cruden Bay, Hatton, Inverugie, Rora, St Fergus and Crimond. The academy's motto is Domus Super Petram Aedificata, meaning "A House Built on a Rock" – a reference to the parable in Matthew 7:24-27. The academy is one of Scotland's largest schools at over 22,920 m^{2} (246,700 sq ft) of gross internal floor area.

The building is split in two distinct designs. The older section of the school was built before the Second World War, whilst the newer section of the school with hexagonal designs came after. The latter section of the school shares space with the town's community centre, theatre and sports facilities.

=== Primary and specialist schools ===
Peterhead has six primary schools: Clerkhill, Buchanhaven, Meethill, Dales Park, Central and Burnhaven.

There is one special school, Anna Ritchie, which caters for most specific learning difficulties, autism and other disabilities.

The former North School, on King Street, closed in 1981. It has been converted into a business.

== Media ==
=== Newspapers ===
Peterhead news appears in The Press and Journal and the Buchan Observer. The Buchanie, as it is known locally, has been published in Peterhead since 1863. The now-defunct Peterhead Sentinel was published on Tuesdays and Fridays between 1858 and 1907.

=== Radio stations ===
Peterhead is served by nation-wide radio stations, BBC Radio Scotland on 93.1, Northsound 1 on 103.0 FM, Original 106 on 106.3 FM, Greatest Hits Radio North East Scotland on DAB and online and Coast Radio, which broadcasts on 101.2 FM. Waves Radio, 101.2 FM, which aired between 1997 and 2023, broadcast from Blackhouse Way in the Blackhouse Industrial Estate. Coast Radio took over the frequency.

=== Television ===
Local news and television programmes are provided by BBC Scotland and STV North (formerly Grampian Television). Television signals are received from the Durris and local relay transmitters.

== Blueprint for Growth ==
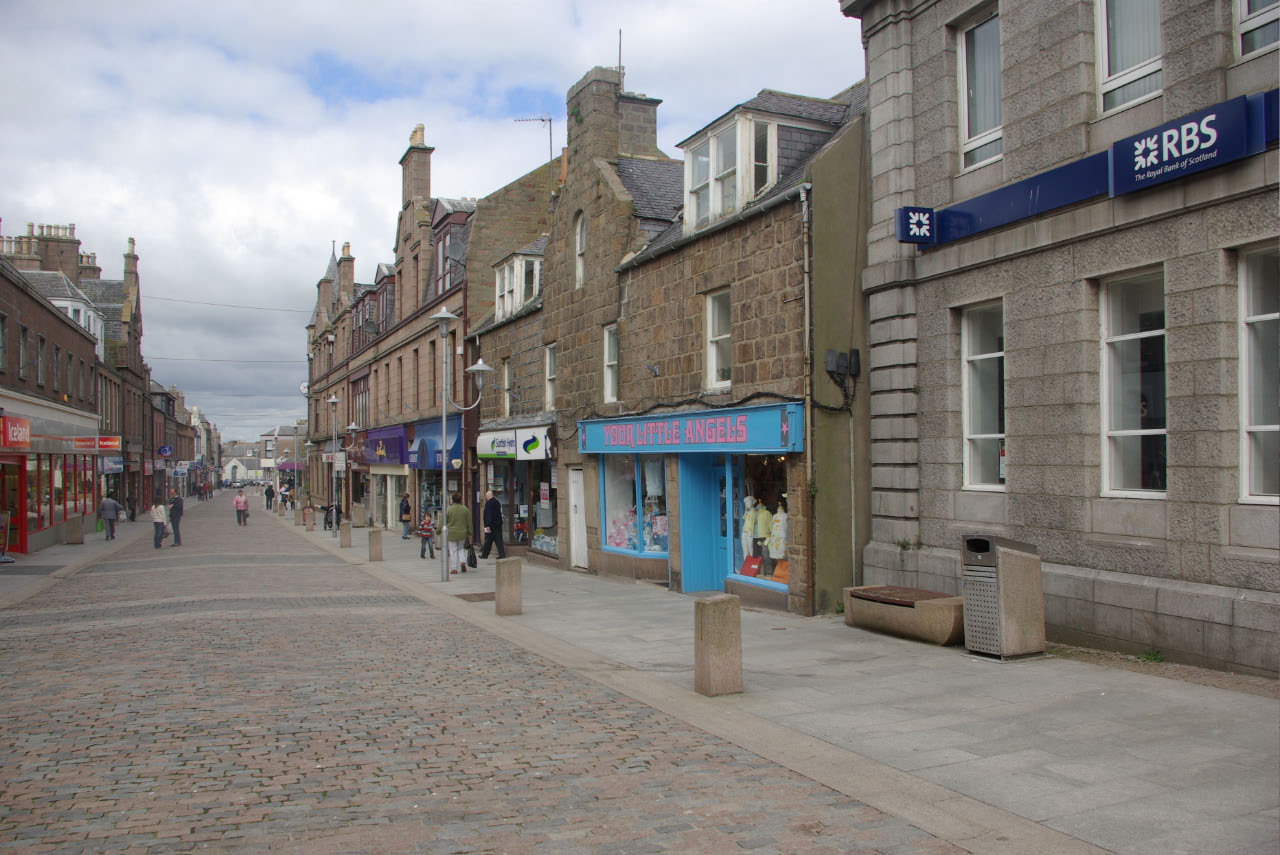
Marischal Street, Peterhead's main shopping street, looking west, in 2010. A bronze statue of Fisher Jessie, the work of Andy Scott, stands on the street near its junction with Chapel Street

In 2008, a Blueprint for Growth was published by Aberdeenshire Council – a plan to extend the town beyond its bypass. The plan involved 4,500 homes, four new primary schools, a new secondary school and a new hospital to be built in the next 20–25 years – hoping to bring 9,000 people to the town.

In 2016, Aberdeenshire Council launched a regeneration strategy for Peterhead — the Peterhead Development Partnership Action Plan 2016–2021 — covering the themes of Peterhead economy, integrating communities and connecting, reinforcing and rediscovering Peterhead's town centres.

== Lighthouses ==
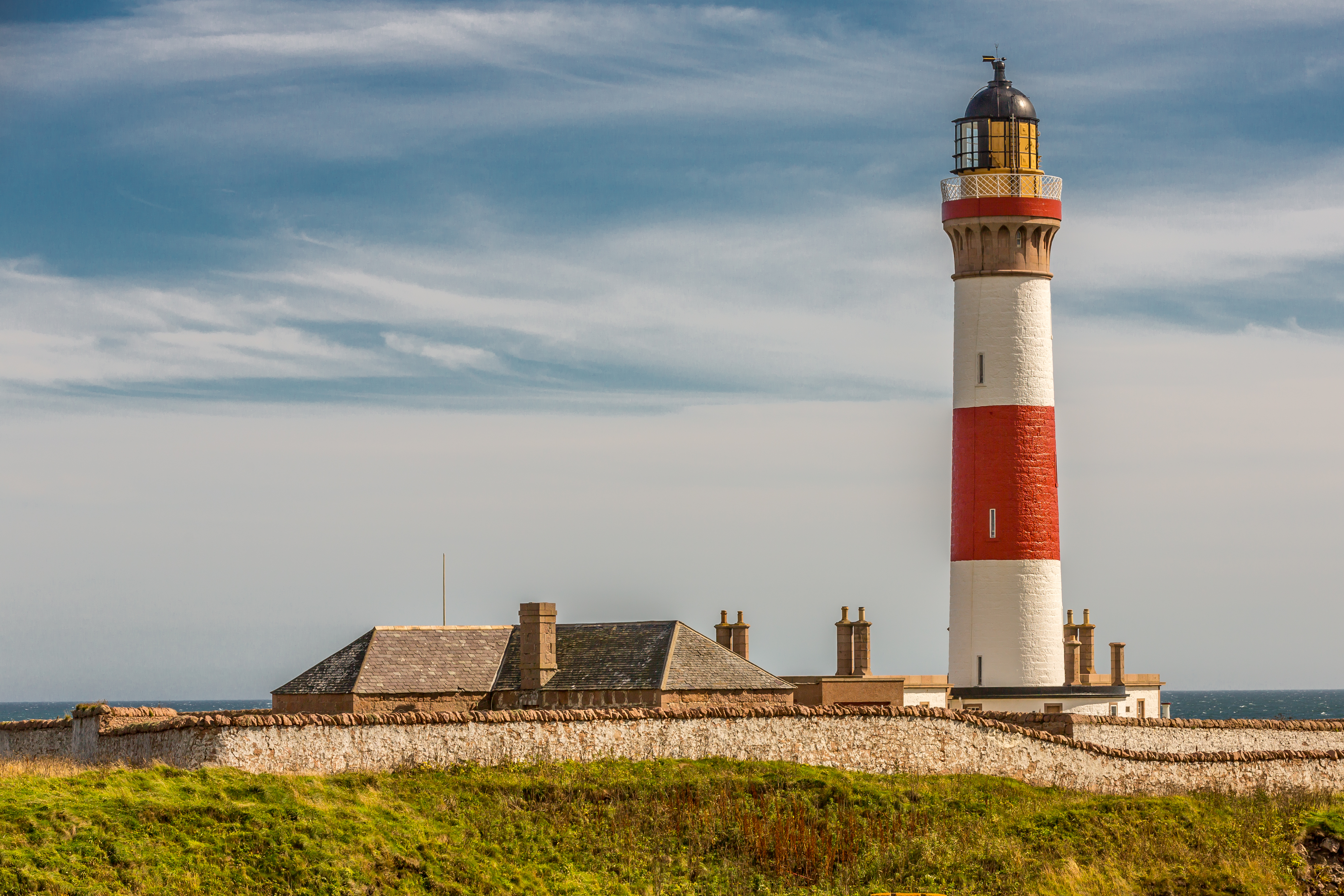
Buchan Ness lighthouse

Peterhead has four lighthouses, two of which are active. In chronological order of construction, they are:

- Buchan Ness lighthouse (1827; Robert Stevenson) is active. It stands on a small island, accessible by a bridge.
- South Breakwater lighthouse (1833; Robert Stevenson) is active, and it is the easternmost lighthouse on mainland Scotland. It is owned by Peterhead Port Authority.
- Harbour South lighthouse (1849; Thomas Stevenson). Now inactive, it originally stood on the Albert Quay, but it was relocated in 2015 to the junction of the Esplanade and Alexandra Parade.
- Harbour North lighthouse (1908). Now inactive, it is located in front of the Port Authority's control building on West Pier.

== Tourism ==
The harbours, maritime and built heritage, Peterhead Town Trail are the town's principal tourism assets alongside the Peterhead Prison Museum. Recent initiatives include investments in the Peterhead Bay area, which have included the berthing of cruise ships in the harbour. A number of projects are planned under the Peterhead Development Partnership and Rediscover Peterhead Business Improvement District initiatives, including tourism strategy development, enhancing existing attractions, improvements to the town's physical attractiveness, and increased marketing and promotion.

The former Victorian-era prison, HM Prison Peterhead, which closed in 2013 due to the construction of a new and larger prison facility, has since been converted into a museum.

=== Peterhead Trail ===
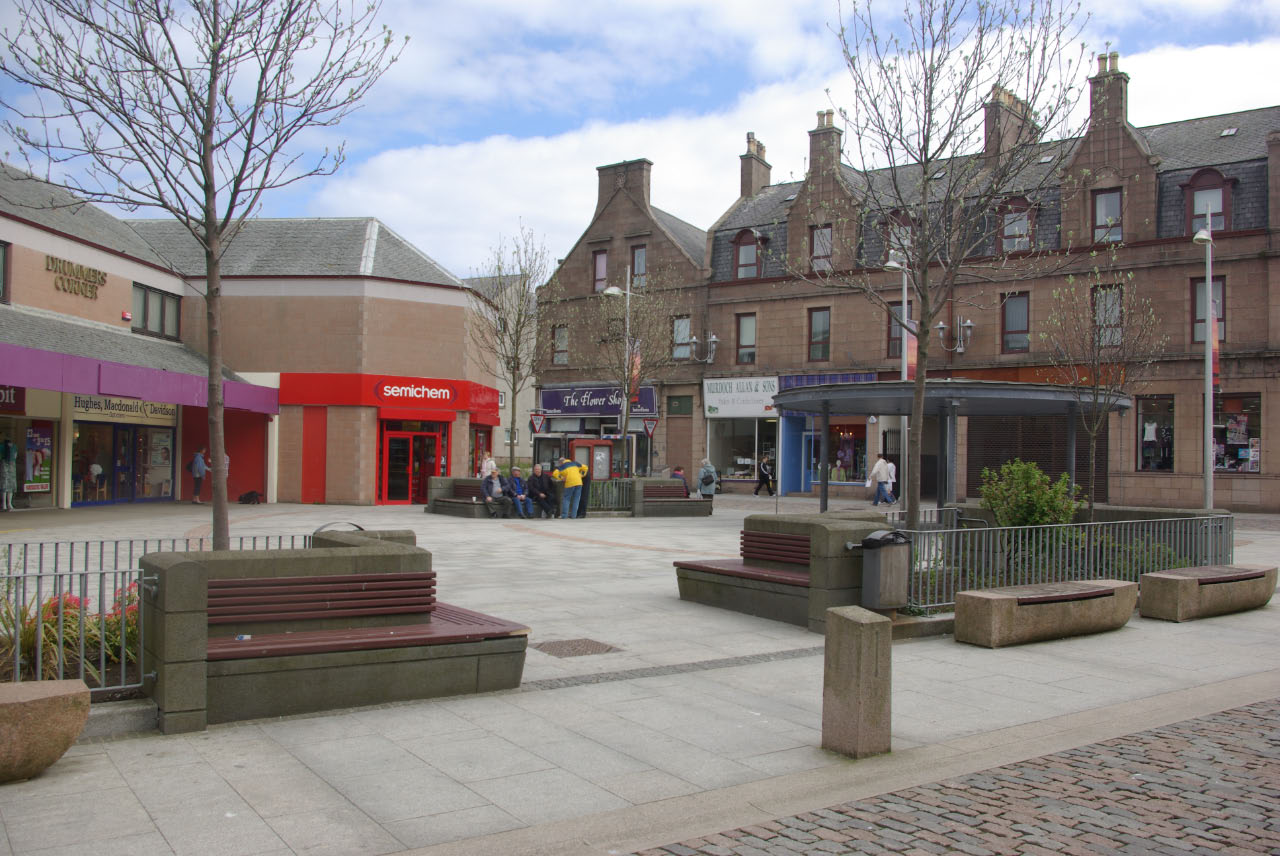
Drummers Corner, at the junctions of Errol Street, Marischal Street and Love Lane

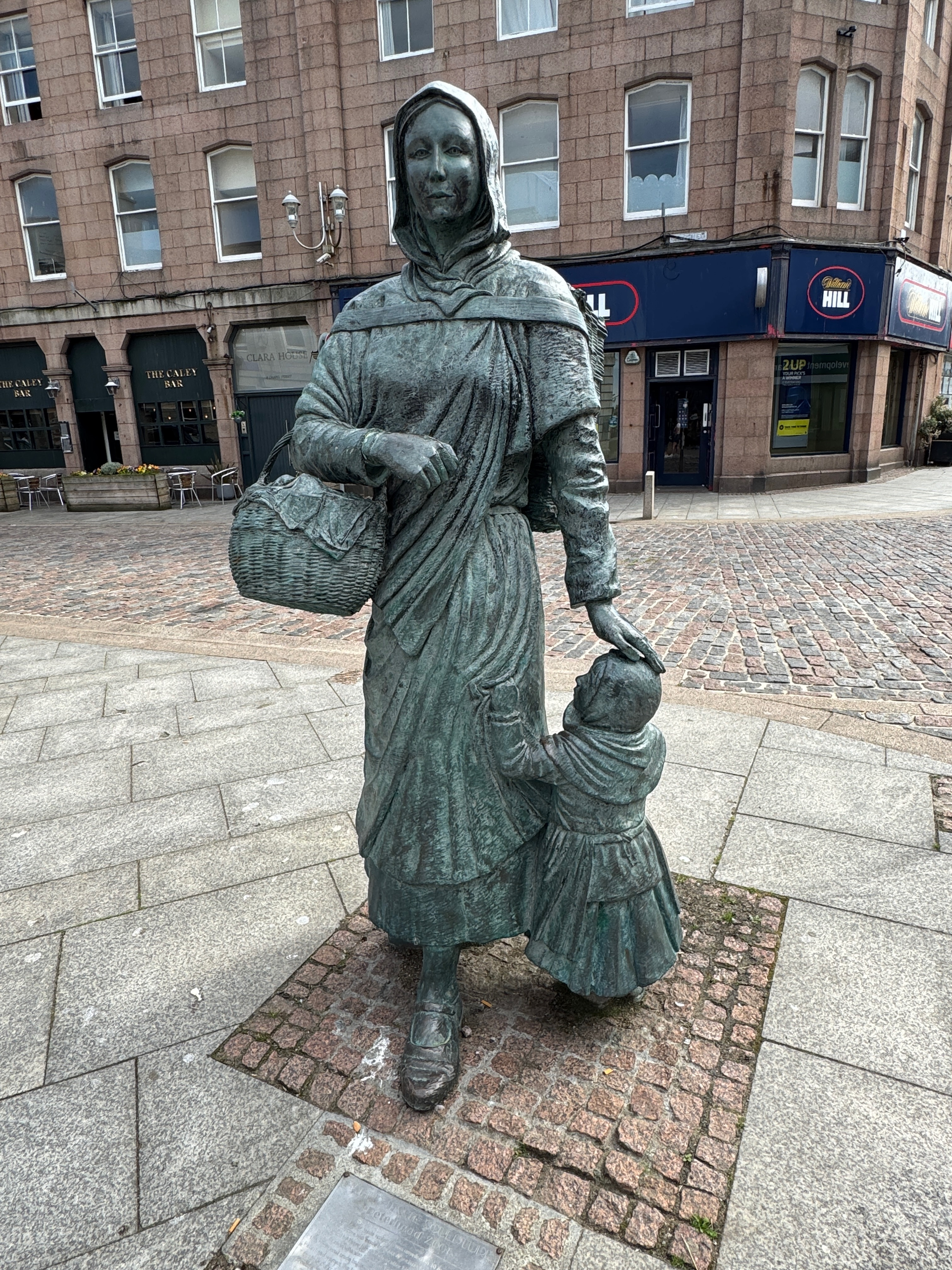
Fisher Jessie statue

The Peterhead Trail website was launched in early 2021, but the enterprise had erected 21 story boards around the town for a year or two beforehand.

The story boards can be visited via three routes: the red route (an extension of the red route; 1.25 miles (2.01 km) long), the blue route (3.5 miles (5.6 km)) and the green route (1.9 miles (3.1 km)).

The route begins at the Muckle Kirk, at the intersection of Kirk Street, Charlotte Street, Maiden Street and Erroll Street, in the southern part of the town. It travels east along Marischal Street, then south on Jamaica Street to Harbour Street. It continues north-east along Harbour Street to Broad Street, then north onto Seagate and North Seagate at Roanheads. The blue route begins here, while the red route turns west onto Port Henry Road, then south-west onto St Peter Street, where it ends, between Queen Street and Prince Street, at the Arbuthnot Museum.

Back at the split of the two routes, the blue route continues north by looping around The Esplanade and Skene Street, then north-west along the shore on Gadle Braes to the old Harbour Street and then behind Ugie Hospital and the Fish-House to Golf Road. There, it turns south, then back east towards the centre of Peterhead, via Ugie Road, Hay Crescent, Queen Street and the short, curved section of Prince Street. Then it is a right turn (to the south-west) onto Landale Road, south-east down a section of York Street, north-east along King Street and an eastern turn onto Prince Street. The finishing point is, as with the red route, Arbuthnot Museum.

The green route travels west and south along the bay, taking in The Links, St Peter's Churchyard, the Scottish Maritime Academy, the Reform Tower and the Prison Museum.

== Sport ==
Peterhead F.C. is a Scottish Professional Football League club that plays in League One. They won the League Two championship in 2013–14, 2018–19 and 2024–25. The club reached the final of the Scottish Challenge Cup in the 2015–16 season.

Peterhead Golf Club, reputedly the 18th-oldest in the world, sits on the banks of the River Ugie at its estuary with the North Sea, just over a mile to the north-west of the town. It has an 18- and a 9-hole course.

Peterhead RFC is a Scottish Rugby Union team that plays at the Lord Catto playing fields.

== Transport ==
=== Road ===
Today, Peterhead is contained largely inside the A90, which runs along the western periphery of the town and was built through the area in the late 1980s. It leads to Fraserburgh to the north and Edinburgh to the south. North Road (the A982) connects to the A90 to the north of town, in Ugieside; West Road (the A950) connects to it from downtown; and South Road (also the A982) connects to it south of the town, in the Invernettie area.

The main roads in and out of downtown Peterhead (from north to south) are Ugie Street, Queen Street and West Road.

=== Bus ===
Peterhead has a number of in-town and out-of-town bus services. The in-town services (run by Stagecoach Bluebird) are the 82 (Chapel Street to Links Terrace), the 83 (Chapel Street to Windmill Road) and the 84 (Chapel Street to West Road). The 84 service does not run on Sundays.

Out-of-town buses service Stirling Village (60, X60, 81, 82A, 82S and 747), Longhaven (60, X60, 61, 63 and 747), Hatton (60, X60, 61, X61 and 747), Ellon (60, X60, 61, X61 and 747), Cruden Bay (61, X61, 63 and 747), Newburgh (61, X61 and 63), Balmedie (61 and X61), Aberdeen (60, X60, 61, X61 and 63), Downiehills (66 and 66A), Longside (66 and 66A), Methlick (64), Mintlaw (66 and 66A), Old Deer (66 and 66A), Stuartfield (66 and 66A), Maud (66 and 66A), St Fergus (69, 69A and X69), Kirktown (69 and 69A), Crimond (69, 69A and X69), Inverallochy (X69), Lonmay (69), Fraserburgh (69, 69A and X69), St Combs (69A and X69), Cairnbulg (69A), Boddam (81, 82A and 82S), Foveran (747), Belhelvie (747), Dyce (747) and Aberdeen Airport (747). The 60, X60, 63, 69 and 84 do not run on Sundays. The 747 Peterhead to Aberdeen Airport service runs on weekdays only. It also has one return peak journey.

HM Prison Peterhead is serviced by numbers 61, X61, 81, 82A and 82S.

Watermill Coaches runs the Peterhead–HMP Prison–Stirling Village–Boddam route 82S on school days.

A2B dial-a-bus is available on weekdays from 9:45 AM to 1:45 PM.

=== Air ===
The nearest airport with scheduled services is Aberdeen Airport. A heliport has been set up at the eastern end of the former RAF Buchan air base. Recreational aviation also takes place from a part of a former runway.

Between 1952 and 2004 the Royal Air Force station RAF Buchan was located near the town. The radar unit ceased to be a RAF station on 1 September 2004 and was downgraded to a Remote Radar Head named RRH Buchan.

=== Rail ===
Peterhead is further from a railway station (at 32 miles or 51 km from Aberdeen) than any other town of its size in Great Britain. The town once had two stations, namely Peterhead railway station and Peterhead Docks railway station. Passenger trains on the Formartine and Buchan Railway stopped in 1965 under the Beeching Axe, and freight in 1970. The start of reconstruction of the Borders Railway to Galashiels (early 2013) has begun a local political debate into the possibility of reopening the line from Aberdeen to Fraserburgh and Peterhead.

The Great North of Scotland Railway with other railways in 1867
Remaining railway (2020)

== Twin town ==
- Ålesund, Norway

== Notable people ==
=== 17th century ===
- George Keith (1638/9–1716), missionary
- William Keith (1669–1749), colonial governor of Pennsylvania
- James Keith (1696–1758), soldier

=== 18th century ===
- James Wales (1747–1795), artist
- Peter Buchan (1790–1854), editor
- Donald Manson (1792–1880), whaler and harbourmaster of Peterhead
- Gilbert Mair (1799–1857), sailor and merchant trader

=== 19th century ===
- Thomas Abernethy (1803–1860), Arctic and Antarctic explorer
- William Hay (1818–1888), architect
- George Kynoch (1834–1891), engineering businessman
- George King (1840–1909), botanist
- Charles Creighton (1847–1927), physician and medical author
- Annie Gordon Baillie (1848 – after 1900), criminal
- William Gibson (1849–1914), Canadian politician
- Dugald McTavish Lumsden (1851–1915), soldier
- James Niven (1851–1925), physician
- Alexander Hall (1880–1943), professional footballer
- Frederick Martin (1882–1950), politician
- Eric Temple Bell (1883–1960), mathematician and science fiction author
- Arthur D. Hay (1884–1952), American attorney and judge
- William Aitken (1894–1973), Scottish League footballer

=== 20th century ===
- Margaret Jope (1913–2004), biochemist
- Jim Lovie (born 1932), professional footballer
- Peter Mullan (born 1959), actor and film maker
- Dame Laura Lee (born 1966), charity worker
- Jon S. Baird (born 1972), director
- Marino Keith (born 1974), professional footballer
- Jackie Dunbar, Scottish National Party Member of Scottish Parliament
- Stuart MacLeod, magician
- Jamie McLeary (born 1981), golfer
- Connor McLennan (born 1999), professional footballer

== See also ==
- Peterhead Fish Market
- List of Provosts of Peterhead
- Clerkhill
- Buchanhaven – village within Peterhead
- Peterhead power station
- Scotland-Norway interconnector
- Whaling in Scotland
