= 75 Broad Street, Peterhead =

Bank building in Aberdeenshire, Scotland

75 Broad Street
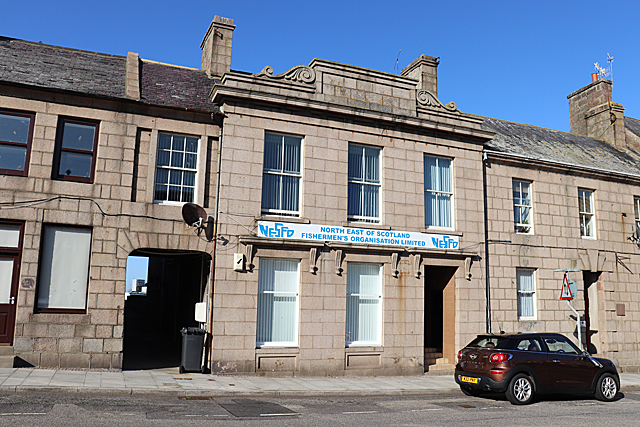
- The building in 2019
- Interactive map of the 75 Broad Street area

General information
- Location: 75 Broad Street, Peterhead, Scotland
- Coordinates: 57.504973°N 1.775029°W
- Completed: 1835

Technical details
- Floor count: 2

75 Broad Street is a Category B listed building in Peterhead, Aberdeenshire, Scotland. It dates to 1835, and was originally a Clydesdale Bank. It is believed to have been designed by Archibald Simpson.

As of 2020, the building is home to the offices of the North East of Scotland Fishermen's Organisation.

== See also ==
- List of listed buildings in Peterhead, Aberdeenshire
