= North School, Peterhead =

Former school building in Peterhead, Scotland

North School
- Interactive map of the North School area

General information
- Location: King Street, Peterhead, Scotland
- Coordinates: 57.508848°N 1.782850°W
- Completed: 1877 (149 years ago)

Technical details
- Floor count: 1

The North School is a historic former school building on King Street in Peterhead, Aberdeenshire, Scotland. Built in 1877 by the Peterhead School Board, it closed in 1981. Today, the one-storey building is occupied by the North Bar and Restaurant, which opened in 2023. It was the home of Glenugie Business Centre and a music school until 2016. The building was slated for demolition before John Adam and Khanim Guild stepped in to establish the North Bar.

It is believed a North Infant School stood on St Peter Street around the turn of the 20th century.

The North School stands adjacent to Peterhead Baptist Church on King Street.
