= Arbuthnot House =

Municipal building in Peterhead, Scotland

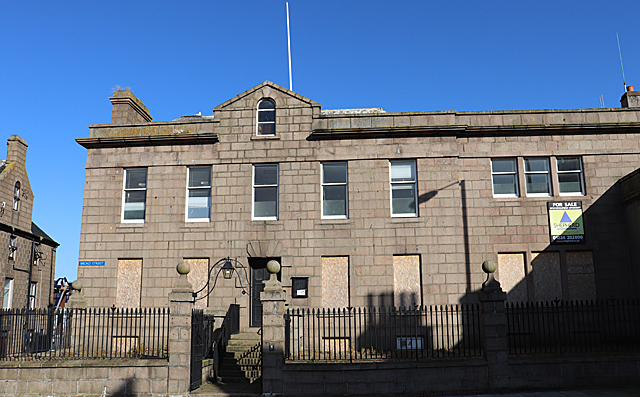
- The front of the building in 2019

- Shown in Aberdeenshire
- 57.5046°N 1.7745°W
- Location: Broad Street, Peterhead

History
- Built: 1805

Site notes
- Architectural style: Neoclassical style

Listed Building – Category B
- Official name: Municipal Chambers, Arbuthnot House
- Designated: 16 April 1971
- Reference no.: LB39694

Arbuthnot House, formerly known as the Municipal Chambers, is a former municipal building on Broad Street in Peterhead in Aberdeenshire in Scotland. The building, which was previously the meeting place of the burgh council, is Category B listed.

== History ==
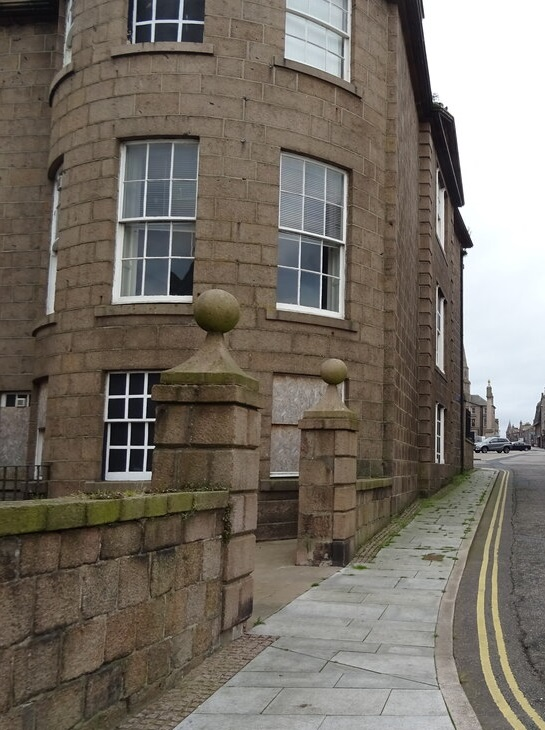
The bowed northeast corner of the building

The building was commissioned as a private house by Robert Arbuthnot of Haddo-Rattray in the 18th century. The site he selected was at the east end of Broad Street facing Peterhead Town House at the opposite end. The original house was quite simple in design and half the depth of the present structure. It was acquired by James Arbuthnot of Dens, a prosperous merchant, in 1768.

The house was extensively remodelled in the early 19th century. The works were carried out in ashlar stone to a neoclassical style and completed in 1805. The design involved a symmetrical main frontage of five bays facing onto Broad Street. The central bay featured a rusticated doorway with a keystone. The other bays on the ground floor and all bays on the first floor were fenestrated with sash windows. At roof level, there was a small gable containing a round headed attic window above the central bay. At the rear of the building there were bowed corners. Internally, the principal room was a two-storey galleried reception hall with apses at both ends.

The building remained in residential use until Peterhead Burgh Council, which had previously been based at Peterhead Town House, relocated to the building shortly after the Second World War. It served as the local seat of government for another two decades until the burgh council was abolished in 1975.

The building was subsequently used to accommodate some departments of Banff and Buchan District Council, but, following the creation of the new unitary council, Aberdeenshire Council, in 1996, it became vacant and was boarded up in around 2020. It was subsequently placed on the Buildings at Risk Register for Scotland. In January 2024, Aberdeenshire Council revealed plans to restore the building and add an extension on its southern side. The proposals involve the relocation of the library service from its existing premises, Arbuthnot Museum in St Peter Street, and the creation of a new regional museum.

== See also ==
- List of listed buildings in Peterhead, Aberdeenshire
