= 59 Broad Street, Peterhead =

House in Peterhead, Aberdeenshire, Scotland

59 Broad Street
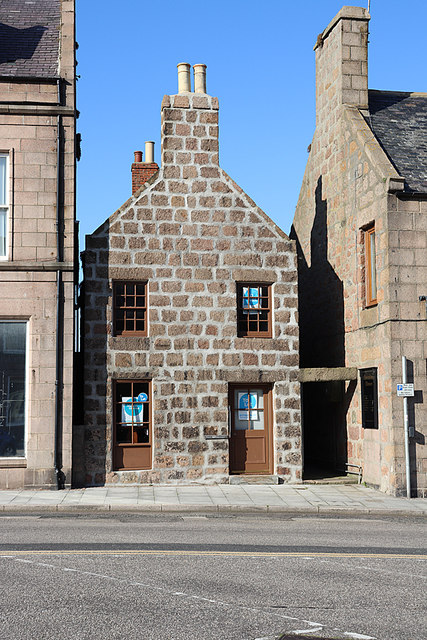
- The building in 2019
- Interactive map of the 59 Broad Street area

General information
- Location: 59 Broad Street, Peterhead, Scotland
- Coordinates: 57.504948°N 1.775483°W
- Completed: mid-18th century

Technical details
- Floor count: 2

59 Broad Street is a Category B listed building in Peterhead, Aberdeenshire, Scotland. Dating to the mid 18th century, the residential building stands with its gable end facing onto Broad Street. This was traditionally done because homeowners were taxed according to street frontage.

== See also ==
- List of listed buildings in Peterhead, Aberdeenshire
