= Annie Gordon Baillie =

Scottish confidence trickster (1848-after 1900)

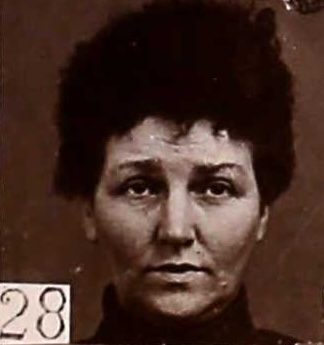
- Born: 1848; Peterhead
- Occupation: Fraudster

Annie Gordon Baillie (February 1848 – after 1900) was a Scottish confidence trickster who, over a criminal career spanning four decades and three continents, defrauded merchants, aristocrats, landowners and charitable donors through elaborate schemes and more than forty aliases.

Born into poverty and illiteracy, she rose to infamy in Victorian Britain, Australia and North America before disappearing from public record around the turn of the 20th century.

== Early life ==
Annie Gordon Baillie was born in February 1848 in Peterhead, Aberdeenshire, Scotland, the illegitimate daughter of a washerwoman and an unknown father. She spent her childhood in and out of the poorhouse, receiving little formal education and remaining largely illiterate into adulthood. Despite her humble origins, contemporaries noted her striking beauty and charm, traits she would later exploit in her cons.

== Criminal career ==
=== Early offences (1860s–1870s) ===
By her early twenties, Baillie had begun defrauding local shopkeepers across Scotland and northern England by running up large unpaid bills under various invented titles and social pretenses. In 1872 she was convicted of obtaining goods by false pretences and sentenced to nine months’ imprisonment.

=== Rise to prominence ===
After her release, Baillie adopted dozens of aristocratic-sounding aliases—at least forty in total—and expanded her schemes beyond retail fraud:

- Protestant Girls’ School in Rome: Posing as a philanthropic aristocrat, she collected subscriptions for a girls’ school in the heart of Catholic Italy, which was never built.
- Crofters’ relocation scheme (1880s): During the Crofters’ War on the Isle of Skye, she convinced around 1,000 tenant farmers to finance a mass emigration to reclaimed marshlands near Melbourne, Australia. None of the lands were ever secured, and Baillie vanished after pocketing the funds.
- Admired benefactors: She ingratiated herself with military officers and members of high society—once persuading a Royal Navy admiral to underwrite her lavish lifestyle—only to default on all promised charitable works.

Throughout these operations, Baillie maintained multiple simultaneous identities, enabling her to reopen credit lines even while wanted under another name.

== Arrests and convictions ==
Despite numerous legal charges across Great Britain, Australia and the United States, Baillie often eluded long-term imprisonment by exploiting inconsistent record-keeping and jurisdictional gaps. Her most substantial sentences included:

- 1872 (Britain): Nine months for fraud.
- Late 1870s (England): Five years’ penal servitude for a major confidence trick involving high-profile donors.
- 1888 (Scotland): Final arrest and conviction, resulting in a cumulative twelve years behind bars.

Upon her release around 1900, Baillie adopted a new identity in the United States and vanished from public record.

== Bibliography ==
- Davis, Mick; Lassman, David (2019). The Adventures of a Victorian Con Woman. Pen & Sword History. ISBN 9781526764867.
