= Broad Street, Peterhead =

Street in Peterhead, Scotland

Broad Street
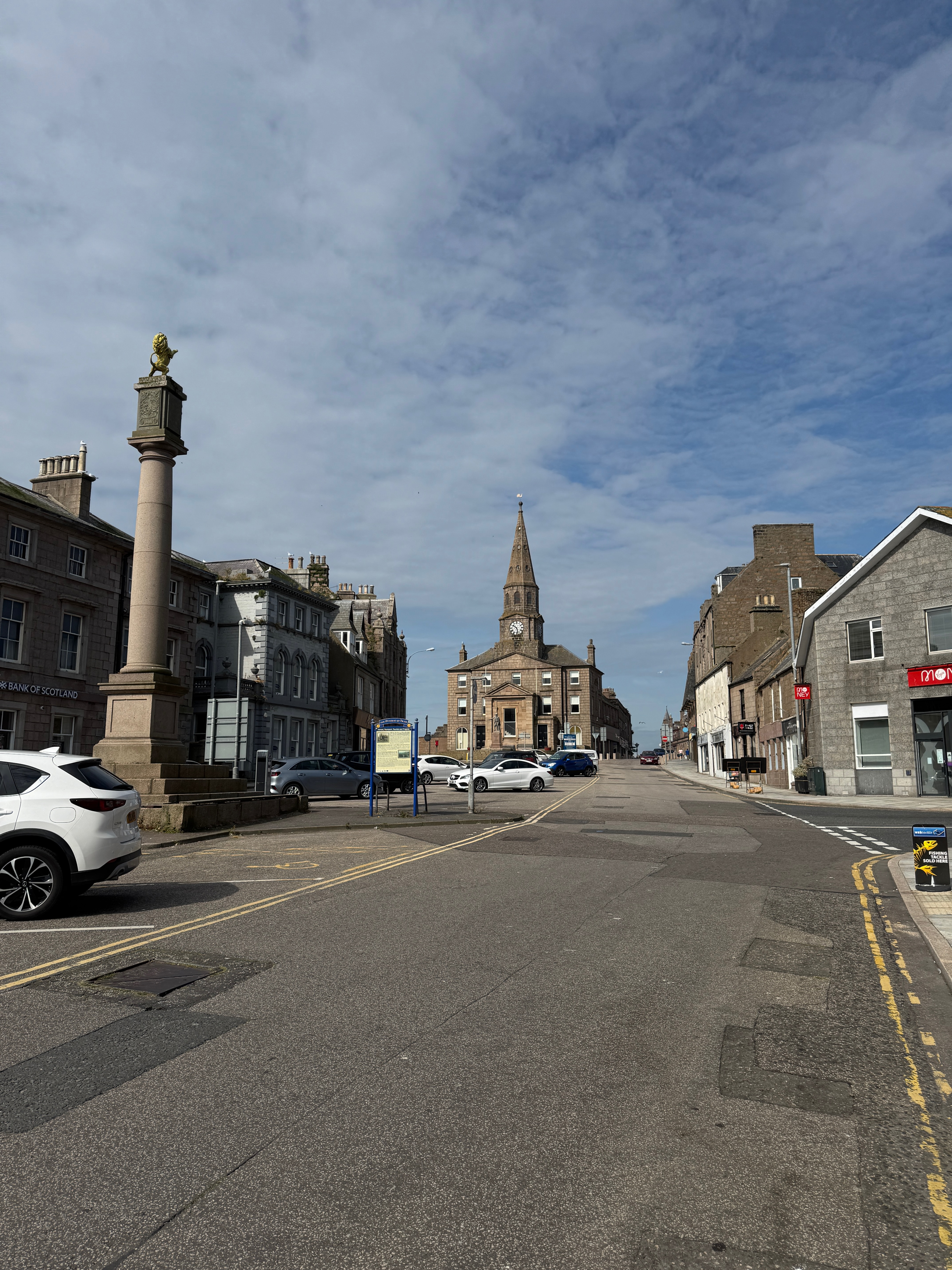
- A 2024 view of Broad Street, looking west to Peterhead Town House. The Reform Monument is in view on the left
- Interactive map of Broad Street
- Length: 0.12 mi (0.19 km)
- Location: Peterhead, Aberdeenshire, Scotland
- East end: Seagate
- West end: Marischal Street and Tollbooth Wynd

Construction
- Completion: 18th century

Broad Street is a street in Peterhead, Scotland. It runs for about 640 feet (200 m), from Seagate in the east to Marischal Street and Tolbooth Wynd in the west.

The street is one-way in a clockwise direction, with public parking along its centre on either side of the Reform Monument, erected in 1833.

Broad Street was formerly the eastern terminus of the A950, which runs between Peterhead and New Pitsligo, 19.2 miles (30.9 km) to the northwest. The A950 now ends a short distance to the east.

== History ==
Peterhead developed uphill between the shore and Longate, which was the main historic district of the town prior to the development of Broad Street in the late 18th century. Longate connects to Broad Street at Longate's southern terminus.

Broad Street's level was lowered in 1844.

Several ship owners lived on Broad Street in the mid-19th century, including James Arbuthnot, John Birnie, Robert Birnie, Robert Kidd, George Maitland Jr and the Robertson brothers. Businesses on the street in 1896 included G & J Tytler dressmakers, at 48 Broad Street, and Nathaniel Brooks's bakery at number 71.

== Architecture ==
Broad Street is bordered by Peterhead Town House to the west, Arbuthnot House to the east, and lined on both sides "by good houses, hotels and banks". The slope between Broad Street and the harbour "contains some of the most picturesque urban streets in Scotland," according to historian Charles McKean.

There are 22 listed buildings (13 Category B; 9 Category C) on Broad Street:

- Arbuthnot House, built in 1805. Category B listed
- 10–16 Broad Street (1–3 Merchant Street). Category B listed
- Royal Hotel, 23–27 Broad Street. Category C listed
- 25 Broad Street. Category C listed
- 28 Broad Street. Category B listed
- 29–33 Broad Street. Category C listed
- Bank of Scotland Building, 32 Broad Street, built in 1858. Category B listed
- 34 Broad Street (1 Rose Street). Category B listed
- 35 Broad Street. Category C listed
- 36–38 Broad Street. Category C listed
- 40–46 Broad Street. Category C listed
- 53–55 Broad Street. Category C listed
- 59 Broad Street, built in the mid-18th century. Category B listed
- 60 Broad Street. Category B listed
- 61–63 Broad Street. Category C listed
- 65–71 Broad Street. Category B listed
- 73 Broad Street. Category B listed
- 75 Broad Street, built in 1835. Category B listed
- 77 Broad Street. Category B listed
- 79–81 Broad Street. Category C listed
- Reform Monument, built in 1833. Category B listed
- Peterhead Town House, built in 1788. Category B listed
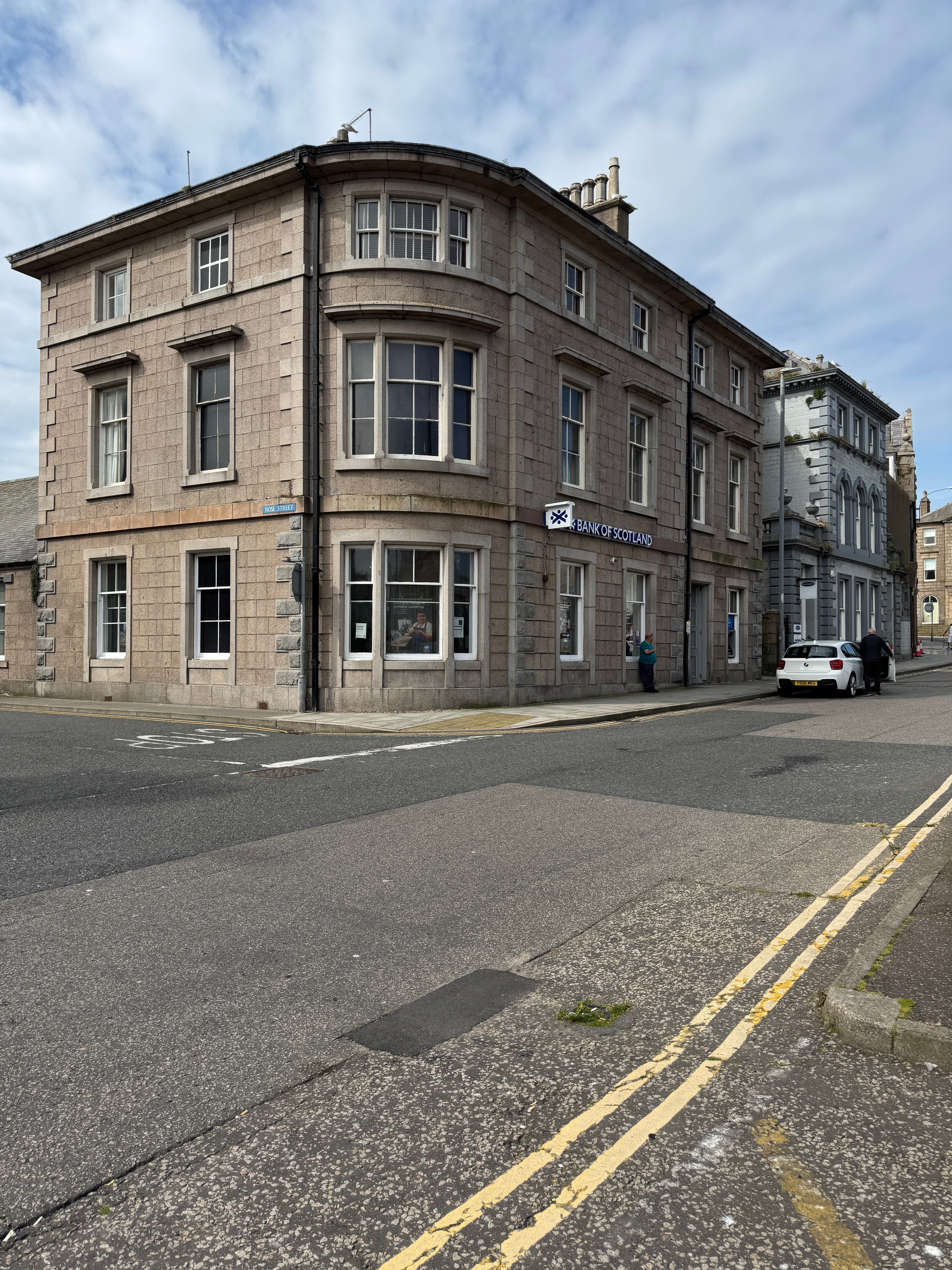
32 Broad Street

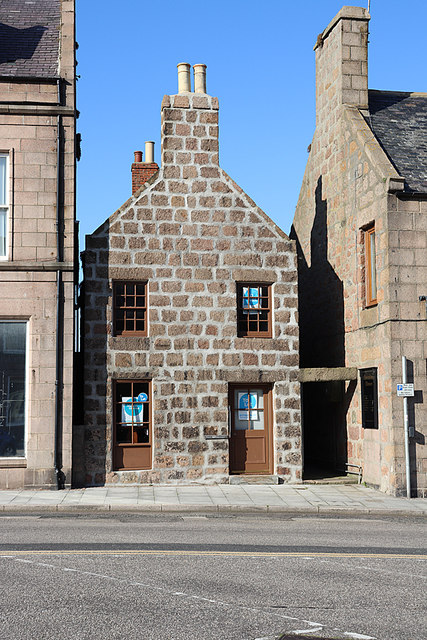
59 Broad Street

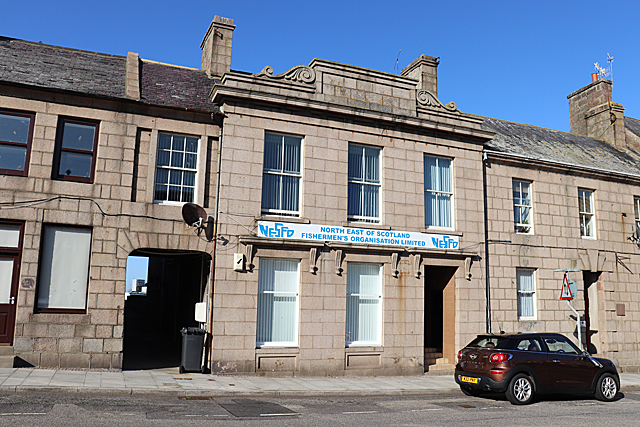
75 Broad Street

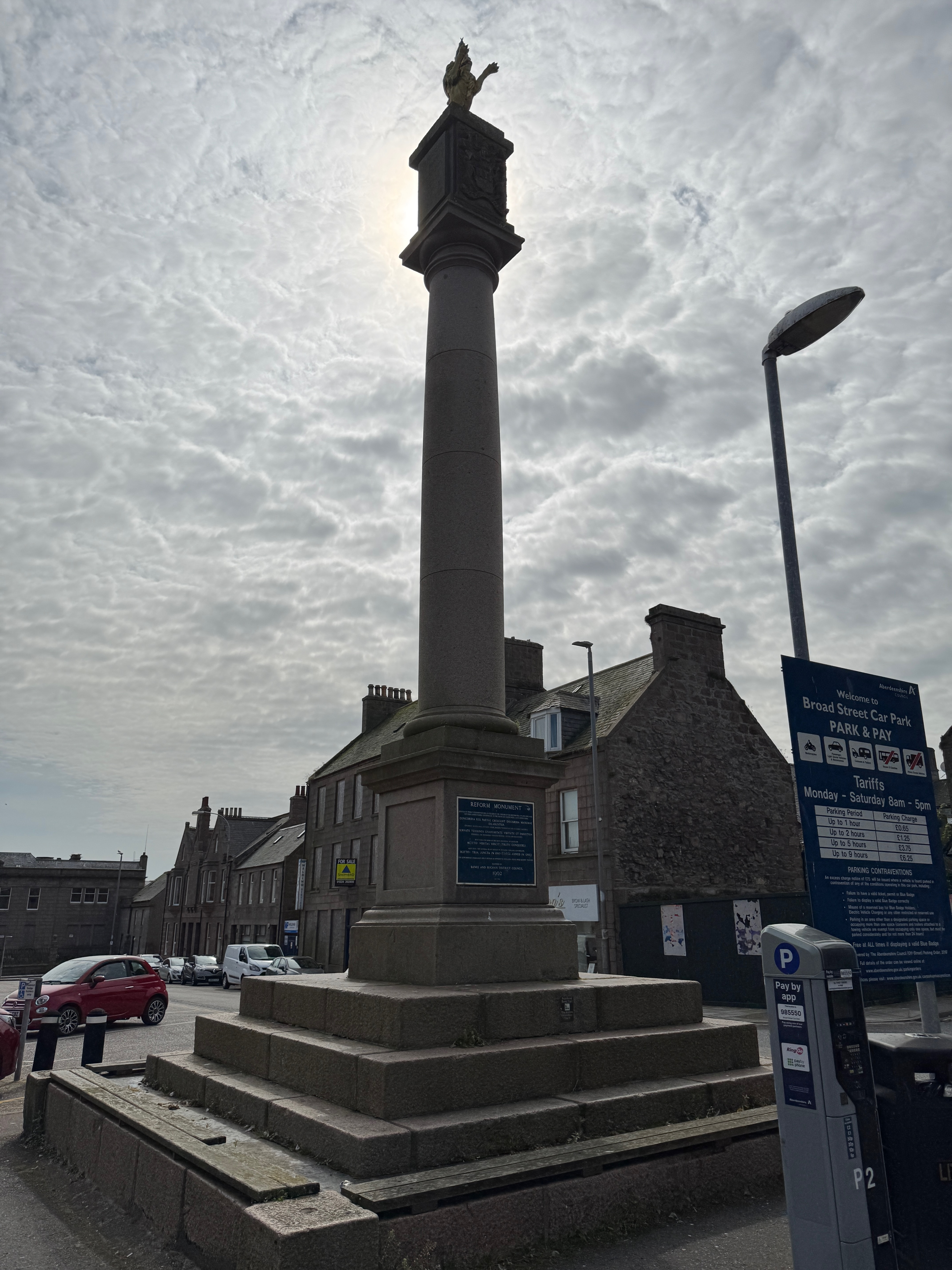
Reform Monument

60 Broad Street, at the eastern end of the road, is on the Buildings at Risk Register for Scotland. It adjoins Arbuthnot House, which is also on the register.

== In popular culture ==
A 19th-century photograph of Broad Street, taken from the Town House by George Washington Wilson, is in the portrait gallery of the National Galleries of Scotland. The collection also features a painting of Broad Street by an unknown artist on an unknown date.
