= Reform Tower, Peterhead =

Historical structure in Peterhead

Reform Tower
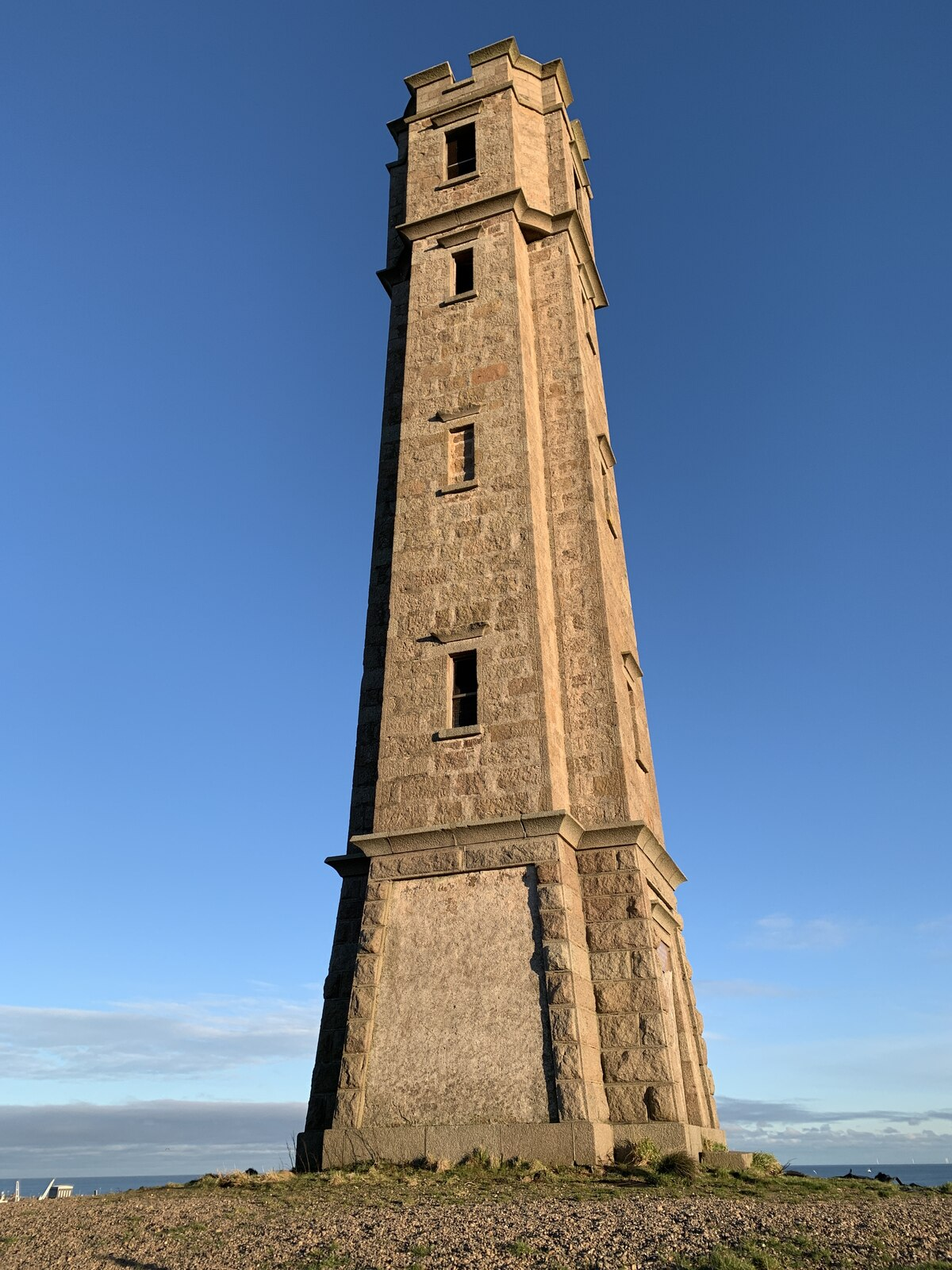
- The building in 2020, looking southeast
- Interactive map of the Reform Tower area

General information
- Type: Tower
- Location: Meethill, Peterhead, Aberdeenshire, Scotland
- Coordinates: 57.492014°N 1.798886°W
- Completed: 1832; 194 years ago

Reform Tower is an historic structure in Meethill, an area to the southwest of the Scottish town of Peterhead, Aberdeenshire. Dating to 1832, it is now a Category B listed building. In five stages, each narrowing slightly, the tower is constructed of squared granite. It was originally designed to be an observatory, but was not completed.

The tower's foundation stone was laid by George Mudie in August 1832. Its architect is not known.

== Gallery ==
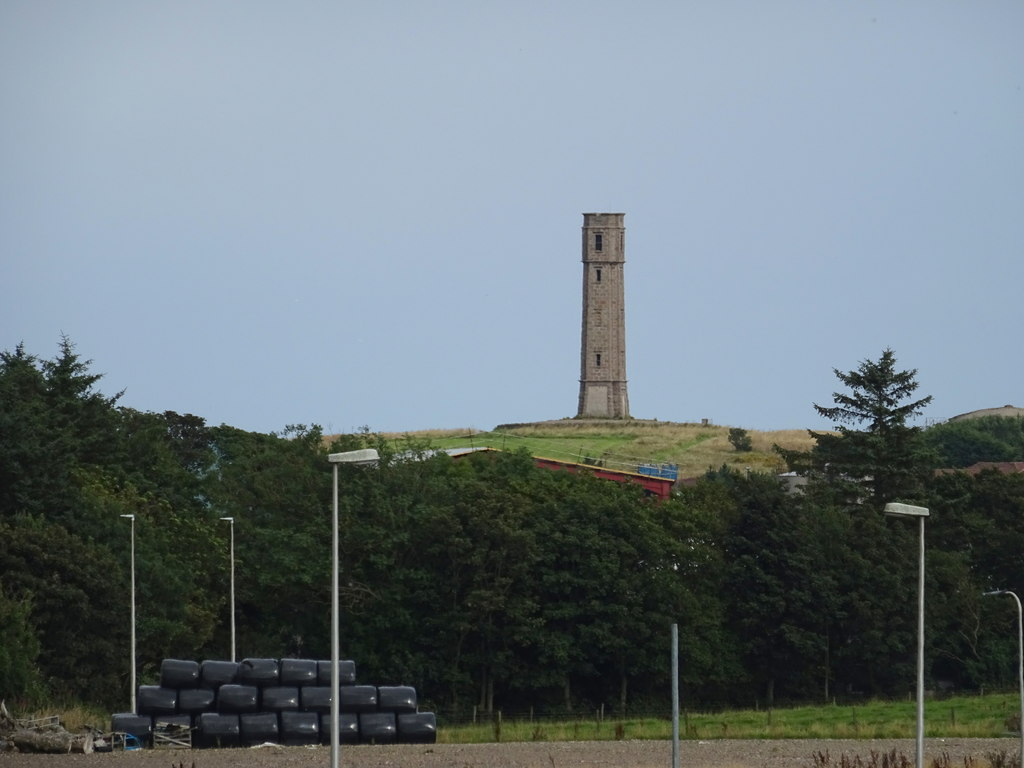
The tower viewed from west, beyond the A90
