= Longate =

Street in Peterhead, Scotland

- Interactive map of Longate
- Length: 0.18 mi (0.29 km)
- Location: Peterhead, Aberdeenshire, Scotland
- North end: North Street
- South end: Broad Street

Construction
- Completion: 18th century

Longate is a street in Peterhead, Scotland. It runs for about 0.18 miles (0.29 km), from North Street in the north to Broad Street in the south.

== History ==
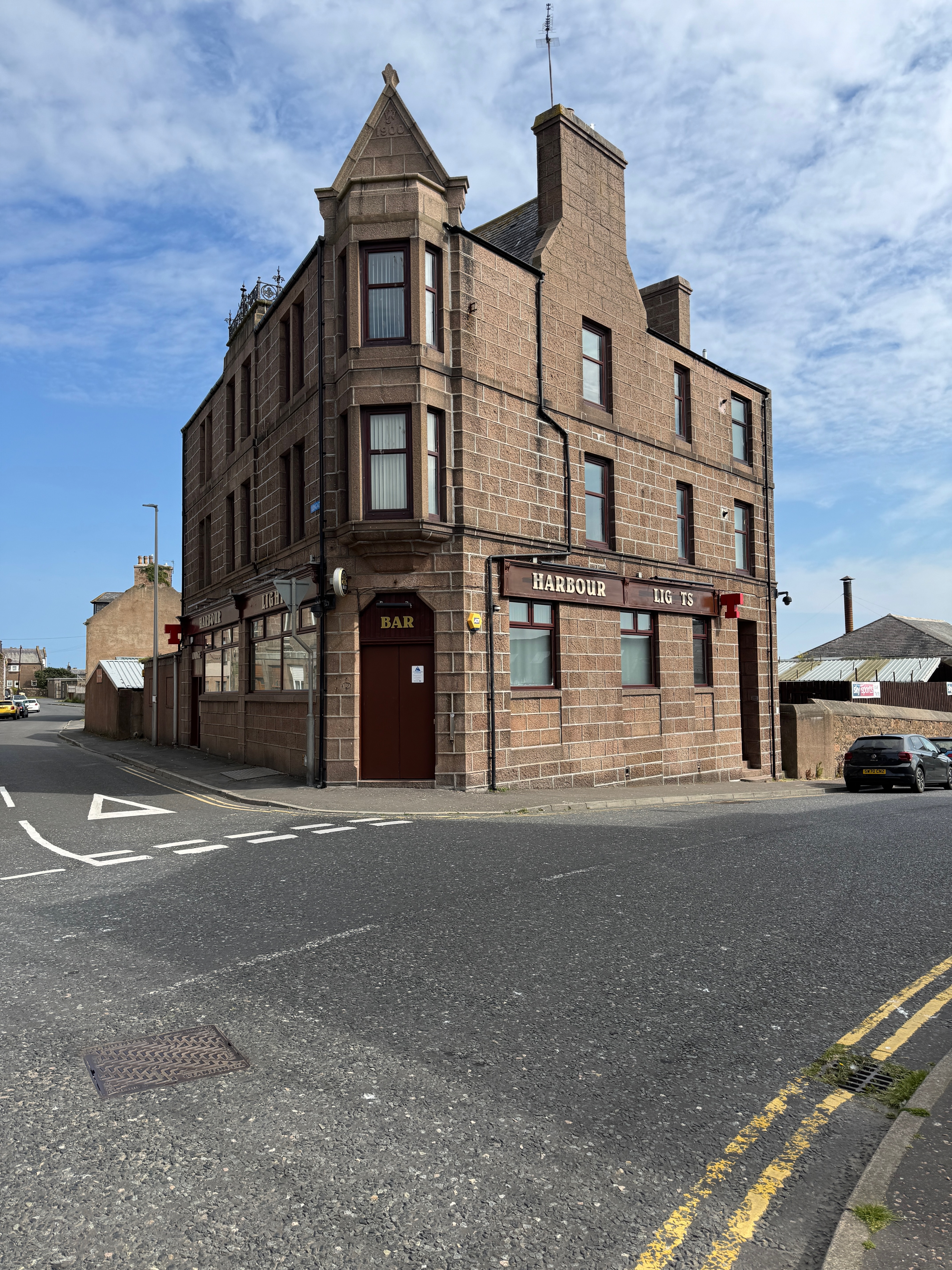
122–124 Longate, now the Harbor Lights Bar, stands at Longate's junction with Ellis Street

Peterhead developed uphill between the shore and Longate, which—until the development of Broad Street in the late 18th century—was the main historic district of the town.

Longate Castle, built in the late 16th century, stood at the northern end of Longate, at its junction with today's Brook Lane. Despite its name, it was a townhouse, not a castle. It was demolished around two centuries later, after it had been in use as the Yokieshill Inn and a plague house.

In 1816, Peter Buchan established the Auchmedden Press in Longate. The press, constructed by Buchan, was made of wood, iron and brass. The following year, the press published the first edition of The Selector, the first periodical undertaken and printed in Peterhead. The press was in operation until 1830.

On 22 December 1715, James Francis Edward Stuart, Prince of Wales, arrived in Peterhead from Dunkirk and stayed "in an ancient house in Longate," where he was visited by the Earl Marischal. The Marischal's last Baron Baillie, Thomas Arbuthnot, put the town on alert for war by summoning able-bodied men and their weapons. The prince left for Newburgh, and the town, by forfeiture of the Keiths, suffered for its loyalty.

Joseph May owned a bakery at 28 Longate in the late 19th century. He was prosecuted in May 1896 for "employing young person at night".
