= List of listed buildings in Peterhead, Aberdeenshire =

This is a list of listed buildings in the parish of Peterhead in Aberdeenshire, Scotland.

== List ==
Name	Location	Date listed	Grid ref. (Note: Sometimes known as OSGB36, the grid reference (where provided) is based on the British national grid reference system used by the Ordnance Survey. • "Guide to National Grid". Ordnance Survey. • "Get-a-map". Ordnance Survey.)	Geo-coordinates	Notes	LB number (Note: Historic Environment Scotland assign a unique alphanumeric identifier to each designated site in Scotland, for listed buildings this always begins with "LB", for example "LB12345".)	Image
4-34 Port Henry Road				57°30′33″N 1°46′32″W	Category C(S)	39838	Upload Photo
1-5 Gladstone Road And 34 North Street				57°30′35″N 1°46′38″W	Category C(S)	39840	Upload Photo
7-35 Gladstone Road				57°30′35″N 1°46′38″W	Category C(S)	39841	Upload Photo
1-17 Almanythie Road And 36 North Street				57°30′35″N 1°46′33″W	Category C(S)	39843	Upload Photo
2-12 New Street And 40 North Street				57°30′37″N 1°46′38″W	Category C(S)	39845	Upload Photo
18, 20 Maiden Street And 34 Tolbooth Wynd				57°30′16″N 1°46′47″W	Category C(S)	39728	Upload Photo
15 Jamaica Street				57°30′12″N 1°46′33″W	Category B	39772	Upload Photo
23 Jamaica Street				57°30′11″N 1°46′33″W	Category B	39774	Upload Photo
11, 13 Merchant Street And 22 St. Andrew Street				57°30′15″N 1°46′39″W	Category B	39786	Upload Photo
Waverley Hotel 10 Merchant Street				57°30′15″N 1°46′40″W	Category B	39802	Upload another image
12, 14 Merchant Street				57°30′15″N 1°46′41″W	Category B	39803	Upload Photo
16, 18 Merchant Street				57°30′14″N 1°46′40″W	Category B	39804	Upload Photo
82-86 Queen Street				57°30′28″N 1°46′57″W	Category C(S)	39825	Upload Photo
10 North Street				57°30′31″N 1°46′38″W	Category C(S)	39830	Upload Photo
24, 26 North Street				57°30′33″N 1°46′38″W	Category C(S)	39832	Upload Photo
Statue of Field Marshal Keith				57°30′18″N 1°46′39″W	Category B	39675	Upload another image
79, 81 Broad Street				57°30′18″N 1°46′29″W	Category C(S)	39686	Upload Photo
10-16 Broad Street And 1, 3 Merchant Street				57°30′17″N 1°46′40″W	Category B	39687	Upload Photo
60 Broad Street				57°30′16″N 1°46′29″W	Category B	39693	Upload Photo
4 Union Street				57°30′17″N 1°46′27″W	Category C(S)	39696	Upload another image
8-14 St. Andrew Street				57°30′16″N 1°46′37″W	Category B	39708	Upload Photo
32 St Andrew Street				57°30′15″N 1°46′42″W	Category C(S)	39711	Upload Photo
5 Maiden Street				57°30′15″N 1°46′45″W	Category B	39715	Upload Photo
14 Queen's Road				57°28′16″N 1°46′43″W	Category C(S)	19797	Upload Photo
Parish Church Of Boddam Manse Terrace				57°28′17″N 1°46′53″W	Category C(S)	16314	Upload Photo
20, 22 Earl's Court				57°28′13″N 1°46′45″W	Category C(S)	16335	Upload Photo
5-9 Rocksley Drive Masonic Lodge No. 1087				57°28′14″N 1°46′45″W	Category B	16337	Upload Photo
11, 13 Rocksley Drive				57°28′13″N 1°46′46″W	Category C(S)	16338	Upload Photo
17 Queen's Road				57°28′14″N 1°46′44″W	Category C(S)	16354	Upload Photo
18, 20 Queen's Road				57°28′15″N 1°46′43″W	Category C(S)	16360	Upload Photo
11 Bridge Street				57°28′16″N 1°46′39″W	Category C(S)	16376	Upload Photo
18 Earl's Court				57°28′13″N 1°46′45″W	Category C(S)	16387	Upload Photo
Mount Pleasant House, Dovecot				57°31′12″N 1°50′07″W	Category B	16393	Upload Photo
Berryhill House				57°30′34″N 1°50′31″W	Category B	16394	Upload Photo
1A Queen's Road				57°28′17″N 1°46′39″W	Category C(S)	13890	Upload Photo
30 North Street And 2 Port Henry Road				57°30′33″N 1°46′38″W	Category C(S)	39834	Upload Photo
Fairview Cottage				57°30′38″N 1°46′37″W	Category C(S)	39836	Upload Photo
1-10 Great Stuart Street				57°30′33″N 1°46′37″W	Category C(S)	39837	Upload Photo
9-39 Port Henry Road				57°30′34″N 1°46′34″W	Category C(S)	39839	Upload Photo
2-18 Almanythie Road And 38 North Street				57°30′36″N 1°46′34″W	Category C(S)	39844	Upload Photo
1-11 New Street And 42 North Street				57°30′37″N 1°46′36″W	Category C(S)	39846	Upload Photo
45 Maiden Street				57°30′16″N 1°46′54″W	Category C(S)	39725	Upload Photo
1 Harbour Street And Harbour Garage Jamaica Street				57°30′10″N 1°46′33″W	Category B	39739	Upload another image
20, 22 Harbour Street				57°30′14″N 1°46′28″W	Category C(S)	39748	Upload Photo
Caledonian Ship Chandling Warehouse, Shore Cafe 26-32 Harbour Street, 2-8 James Street, And 12 Union Street				57°30′15″N 1°46′26″W	Category B	39750	Upload another image
Craignabo 16 Charlotte Street				57°30′15″N 1°46′49″W	Category C(S)	39759	Upload Photo
13-17 Rose Street And 30 32 James Street				57°30′16″N 1°46′33″W	Category C(S)	39767	Upload Photo
6 Jamaica Street				57°30′15″N 1°46′35″W	Category C(S)	39778	Upload Photo
10, 12 Jamaica Street				57°30′14″N 1°46′35″W	Category C(S)	39779	Upload Photo
18-20 Jamaica Street				57°30′13″N 1°46′35″W	Category B	39782	Upload Photo
23 Merchant Street				57°30′14″N 1°46′39″W	Category B	39788	Upload Photo
45, 47 Merchant Street				57°30′11″N 1°46′39″W	Category C(S)	39796	Upload Photo
30 Merchant Street				57°30′12″N 1°46′40″W	Category C(S)	39810	Upload Photo
2, 4 Threadneedle Street				57°30′16″N 1°46′43″W	Category B	39813	Upload Photo
West Associate Church St. Peter Street				57°30′24″N 1°46′54″W	Category B	39819	Upload Photo
68-72 Queen Street				57°30′27″N 1°46′54″W	Category C(S)	39822	Upload Photo
6 North Street				57°30′30″N 1°46′38″W	Category C(S)	39828	Upload Photo
16-20, 24, 26 Marischal Street				57°30′19″N 1°46′44″W	Category B	39672	Upload Photo
James Reid & Son Offices And Gladys Sim, Hairdresser Broad Place, 25 Broad Street				57°30′20″N 1°46′38″W	Category C(S)	39677	Upload Photo
65, 67, 71 Broad Street And Pend To 73				57°30′18″N 1°46′30″W	Category B	39683	Upload Photo
17 James Street				57°30′15″N 1°46′30″W	Category C(S)	39697	Upload Photo
21 James Street				57°30′15″N 1°46′31″W	Category C(S)	39698	Upload Photo
18, 20 James Street				57°30′15″N 1°46′30″W	Category C(S)	39700	Upload Photo
7 St. Andrew Street				57°30′15″N 1°46′37″W	Category C(S)	39703	Upload Photo
39-41 Maiden Street				57°30′16″N 1°46′52″W	Category B	39723	Upload Photo
4 Rocksley Drive				57°28′14″N 1°46′46″W	Category C(S)	19795	Upload Photo
Brethren Meeting House. 26 Gordon Street				57°28′16″N 1°46′50″W	Category C(S)	16313	Upload another image
Three Seats - Junction Harbour Street And Queens Road				57°28′17″N 1°46′39″W	Category C(S)	16345	Upload Photo
1 Queen's Road				57°28′17″N 1°46′39″W	Category B	16346	Upload Photo
Windmill Tower, Glenugie distillery Invernettie				57°29′16″N 1°47′44″W	Category B	16363	Upload another image
Sandford Lodge				57°28′50″N 1°47′42″W	Category B	16364	Upload another image
3 Harbour Street				57°30′54″N 1°47′15″W	Category C(S)	16369	Upload Photo
Deserted House Between 9 Earl's Court And "Bridgend"				57°28′15″N 1°46′39″W	Category C(S)	16380	Upload Photo
2 And 4 Earl's Court				57°28′15″N 1°46′43″W	Category C(S)	16383	Upload Photo
16 Earl's Court				57°28′13″N 1°46′44″W	Category C(S)	16386	Upload Photo
Cocklaw Mains Farmhouse				57°29′52″N 1°49′58″W	Category C(S)	16391	Upload Photo
Boddam Castle				57°27′59″N 1°46′53″W	Category B	13888	Upload another image
26, 28 Maiden Street				57°30′16″N 1°46′49″W	Category C(S)	39730	Upload Photo
1B-3 Ship Row				57°30′14″N 1°46′19″W	Category C(S)	39734	Upload Photo
Brae Cottage, Harbour Street				57°30′11″N 1°46′30″W	Category B	39744	Upload Photo
18, 19 Harbour Street				57°30′13″N 1°46′28″W	Category B	39747	Upload Photo
1, 2 Bath Street And 44 Merchant Street				57°30′10″N 1°46′40″W	Category C(S)	39752	Upload Photo
10 Charlotte Street				57°30′15″N 1°46′53″W	Category B	39756	Upload Photo
Merlynne, 20 Charlotte Street				57°30′14″N 1°46′47″W	Category C(S)	39762	Upload Photo
22 Charlotte Street				57°30′13″N 1°46′46″W	Category C(S)	39764	Upload Photo
4-10 Rose Street				57°30′16″N 1°46′35″W	Category C(S)	39768	Upload Photo
27 Jamaica Street				57°30′11″N 1°46′33″W	Category B	39776	Upload Photo
22 Jamaica Street				57°30′12″N 1°46′35″W	Category B	39783	Upload Photo
17-21 Merchant Street And 17, 19 St. Andrew Street				57°30′15″N 1°46′39″W	Category B	39787	Upload Photo
St. Peter's Episcopal Church Hall Merchant Street				57°30′14″N 1°46′40″W	Category C(S)	39806	Upload Photo
42 Merchant Street				57°30′11″N 1°46′40″W	Category C(S)	39811	Upload Photo
27 Prince Street				57°30′26″N 1°47′03″W	Category B	39827	Upload Photo
Royal Hotel 23, 27 Broad Street				57°30′19″N 1°46′38″W	Category C(S)	39676	Upload Photo
29-33 Broad Street				57°30′19″N 1°46′37″W	Category C(S)	39678	Upload Photo
77 Broad Street				57°30′18″N 1°46′29″W	Category B	39685	Upload Photo
Bank of Scotland Building Broad Street				57°30′17″N 1°46′35″W	Category B	39689	Upload another image
Municipal Chambers, Arbuthnot House				57°30′17″N 1°46′28″W	Category B	39694	Upload another image
28 James Street				57°30′16″N 1°46′32″W	Category C(S)	39702	Upload Photo
13 Maiden Street				57°30′15″N 1°46′47″W	Category C(S)	39718	Upload Photo
17, 19 Maiden Street				57°30′15″N 1°46′48″W	Category C(S)	39719	Upload Photo
21, 23 Maiden Street				57°30′15″N 1°46′49″W	Category C(S)	39720	Upload Photo
2 Rocksley Drive				57°28′14″N 1°46′45″W	Category C(S)	16340	Upload Photo
6 Rocksley Drive				57°28′14″N 1°46′46″W	Category C(S)	16341	Upload Photo
9 Queen's Road				57°28′16″N 1°46′41″W	Category C(S)	16350	Upload Photo
10 Queen's Road				57°28′16″N 1°46′42″W	Category C(S)	16358	Upload Photo
Reform Tower, Meethill				57°29′31″N 1°47′56″W	Category B	16362	Upload another image
1 Harbour Street				57°30′54″N 1°47′14″W	Category C(S)	16368	Upload Photo
Retaining Wall Harbour Street-Bridge Street				57°28′16″N 1°46′37″W	Category C(S)	16370	Upload Photo
1 Bridge Street				57°28′16″N 1°46′41″W	Category C(S)	16371	Upload Photo
9 Bridge Street				57°28′16″N 1°46′38″W	Category C(S)	16375	Upload Photo
5 Earl's Court				57°28′15″N 1°46′41″W	Category C(S)	16378	Upload Photo
2 Bridge Street And Earl's Court				57°28′15″N 1°46′38″W	Category C(S)	16381	Upload Photo
Richmond Cottage, Outhouses And Garden Wall Now Richmondhill				57°29′57″N 1°49′31″W	Category B	16390	Upload Photo
Blackhill House, Including South Garden Walls And Gates				57°28′48″N 1°51′33″W	Category B	16395	Upload Photo
Wellington Place, Farmhouse				57°29′11″N 1°49′33″W	Category B	16396	Upload Photo
8, 10 Maiden Street				57°30′16″N 1°46′45″W	Category C(S)	39726	Upload Photo
36, 38 Maiden Street				57°30′17″N 1°46′52″W	Category C(S)	39731	Upload Photo
42-46 Maiden Street And 4-12 Love Lane				57°30′17″N 1°46′54″W	Category B	39732	Upload Photo
Custom House, 12-14 Harbour Street				57°30′12″N 1°46′29″W	Category B	39745	Upload Photo
3, 4 Charlotte Street And 49 Maiden Street				57°30′16″N 1°46′56″W	Category C(S)	39754	Upload Photo
18 Charlotte Street And 15 Maiden Street				57°30′14″N 1°46′48″W	Category B	39760	Upload Photo
19 Charlotte Street				57°30′14″N 1°46′47″W	Category C(S)	39761	Upload Photo
3 Rose Street				57°30′17″N 1°46′34″W	Category C(S)	39765	Upload Photo
7, 11 Rose Street				57°30′16″N 1°46′33″W	Category C(S)	39766	Upload Photo
S.A.I. Warehouse 1, 3 Jamaica Street				57°30′14″N 1°46′33″W	Category B	39769	Upload Photo
7, 9 Jamaica Street				57°30′13″N 1°46′33″W	Category C(S)	39770	Upload Photo
17-21 Jamaica Street				57°30′12″N 1°46′33″W	Category B	39773	Upload Photo
4 Jamaica Street And 1 St. Andrew Street				57°30′15″N 1°46′35″W	Category C(S)	39777	Upload Photo
14 Jamaica Street				57°30′14″N 1°46′35″W	Category B	39780	Upload Photo
16, 16A Jamaica Street				57°30′13″N 1°46′35″W	Category B	39781	Upload Photo
2 Wallace Street (Gable To Merchant Street)				57°30′11″N 1°46′39″W	Category C(S)	39797	Upload Photo
51 Merchant Street				57°30′10″N 1°46′39″W	Category C(S)	39799	Upload Photo
Kirkburn House (Former Manse) And Offices				57°30′18″N 1°47′29″W	Category B	39670	Upload Photo
40-46 Broad Street				57°30′17″N 1°46′32″W	Category C(S)	39692	Upload another image
25 St. Andrews Street				57°30′15″N 1°46′42″W	Category C(S)	39705	Upload Photo
3 Maiden Street				57°30′15″N 1°46′44″W	Category B	39714	Upload Photo
22 Queen's Road				57°28′15″N 1°46′44″W	Category C(S)	16312	Upload Photo
24 Earl's Court				57°28′13″N 1°46′45″W	Category C(S)	16336	Upload Photo
7 Harbour Street				57°30′54″N 1°47′16″W	Category C(S)	16343	Upload Photo
8 Queen's Road				57°28′16″N 1°46′41″W	Category C(S)	16357	Upload Photo
Buchan Ness Lighthouse				57°28′14″N 1°46′28″W	Category A	16367	Upload another image
Peterhead Prison Stalk And Workshop				57°29′24″N 1°47′21″W	Category C(S)	49854	Upload Photo
Rattray View, 46 North Street				57°30′38″N 1°46′38″W	Category C(S)	39835	Upload Photo
12-42 Gladstone Road				57°30′34″N 1°46′36″W	Category C(S)	39842	Upload Photo
28 Cairntroddlie				57°30′19″N 1°47′36″W	Category C(S)	39849	Upload Photo
22, 24 Maiden Street				57°30′16″N 1°46′48″W	Category C(S)	39729	Upload Photo
Peterhead Harbour				57°30′18″N 1°46′25″W	Category B	39733	Upload another image
Caledonian Fish Selling Company (South Block) Shiprow				57°30′13″N 1°46′19″W	Category C(S)	39736	Upload Photo
2 Harbour Street				57°30′11″N 1°46′32″W	Category C(S)	39740	Upload Photo
24 Jamaica Street				57°30′12″N 1°46′34″W	Category B	39784	Upload Photo
29 Merchant Street				57°30′14″N 1°46′39″W	Category B	39790	Upload Photo
49 Merchant Street				57°30′10″N 1°46′39″W	Category B	39798	Upload Photo
A. Macdonald 1 Errol Street And 2 Love Lane				57°30′18″N 1°46′54″W	Category C(S)	39814	Upload Photo
30-34 Queen Street				57°30′24″N 1°46′47″W	Category C(S)	39820	Upload Photo
36-38 Queen Street				57°30′24″N 1°46′48″W	Category B	39821	Upload Photo
61-63 Broad Street				57°30′18″N 1°46′31″W	Category C(S)	39682	Upload Photo
23, 25 James Street				57°30′15″N 1°46′31″W	Category C(S)	39699	Upload Photo
22-26 James Street				57°30′15″N 1°46′31″W	Category B	39701	Upload Photo
17 (9-15) St. Andrews Street				57°30′15″N 1°46′38″W	Category B	39704	Upload Photo
1 Rocksley Drive				57°28′14″N 1°46′44″W	Category C(S)	19794	Upload Photo
3 Earl's Court				57°28′14″N 1°46′42″W	Category C(S)	19798	Upload Photo
3 Queen's Road				57°28′17″N 1°46′39″W	Category C(S)	16347	Upload Photo
15 Queen's Road				57°28′14″N 1°46′43″W	Category C(S)	16353	Upload Photo
16 Queen's Road				57°28′16″N 1°46′43″W	Category C(S)	16359	Upload Photo
Whitehill Lodge				57°29′27″N 1°48′47″W	Category C(S)	16361	Upload Photo
1 Earl's Court				57°28′15″N 1°46′42″W	Category C(S)	16377	Upload Photo
Balmoor Bridge Over River Ugie				57°31′30″N 1°49′10″W	Category B	16388	Upload another image See more images
Howe O'Buchan House				57°30′28″N 1°49′30″W	Category C(S)	16389	Upload another image See more images
Dales				57°29′46″N 1°48′33″W	Category B	16392	Upload Photo
26 Cairntroddlie				57°30′19″N 1°47′35″W	Category C(S)	39848	Upload Photo
12 Maiden Street				57°30′16″N 1°46′46″W	Category B	39727	Upload Photo
3 Harbour Street				57°30′11″N 1°46′32″W	Category C(S)	39741	Upload Photo
15-17 Harbour Street				57°30′13″N 1°46′28″W	Category C(S)	39746	Upload Photo
6 Charlotte Street And 47 Maiden Street				57°30′16″N 1°46′55″W	Category C(S)	39755	Upload Photo
21 Charlotte Street				57°30′13″N 1°46′46″W	Category C(S)	39763	Upload Photo
25 Jamaica Street				57°30′11″N 1°46′33″W	Category B	39775	Upload Photo
26 Jamaica Street				57°30′12″N 1°46′34″W	Category B	39785	Upload Photo
25, 27 Merchant Street				57°30′14″N 1°46′39″W	Category C(S)	39789	Upload Photo
37 Merchant Street				57°30′13″N 1°46′39″W	Category C(S)	39792	Upload Photo
39 Merchant Street				57°30′12″N 1°46′39″W	Category C(S)	39793	Upload Photo
43 Merchant Street				57°30′12″N 1°46′39″W	Category C(S)	39795	Upload Photo
8 Merchant Street				57°30′16″N 1°46′40″W	Category C(S)	39801	Upload Photo
St. Peter's Episcopal Church Merchant Street				57°30′13″N 1°46′41″W	Category B	39807	Upload another image
28 Merchant Street				57°30′12″N 1°46′40″W	Category C(S)	39809	Upload Photo
12 Uphill Lane And Wall To South				57°30′13″N 1°46′43″W	Category C(S)	39812	Upload Photo
1 St. Peter Street				57°30′19″N 1°47′06″W	Category B	39816	Upload Photo
76 Queen Street				57°30′28″N 1°46′55″W	Category B	39823	Upload Photo
Town House, Broad Street				57°30′18″N 1°46′40″W	Category B	39674	Upload another image
35 Broad Street				57°30′19″N 1°46′36″W	Category C(S)	39679	Upload Photo
34 Broad Street And 1 Rose Street				57°30′17″N 1°46′33″W	Category B	39690	Upload Photo
36-38 Broad Street				57°30′17″N 1°46′33″W	Category C(S)	39691	Upload Photo
1, 3 Union Street Union Bar And 2, Seagate				57°30′18″N 1°46′27″W	Category B	39695	Upload Photo
18, 20 St. Andrew Street				57°30′15″N 1°46′39″W	Category C(S)	39710	Upload Photo
34, 36 St. Andrew Street				57°30′15″N 1°46′43″W	Category C(S)	39712	Upload Photo
1 Maiden Street				57°30′15″N 1°46′44″W	Category B	39713	Upload Photo
7 Maiden Street				57°30′15″N 1°46′46″W	Category B	39716	Upload Photo
29, 31 Maiden Street				57°30′16″N 1°46′50″W	Category B	39722	Upload Photo
9 Harbour Street				57°30′55″N 1°47′19″W	Category C(S)	16344	Upload Photo
2 Queen's Road				57°28′17″N 1°46′40″W	Category C(S)	16355	Upload Photo
6 Queen's Road				57°28′17″N 1°46′41″W	Category C(S)	16356	Upload Photo
Buchanness Cottage				57°28′02″N 1°46′47″W	Category B	16366	Upload Photo
7 Bridge Street				57°28′16″N 1°46′39″W	Category C(S)	16374	Upload Photo
11 Earl's Court				57°28′14″N 1°46′40″W	Category C(S)	16382	Upload Photo
Ravenscraig Castle				57°31′45″N 1°50′32″W	Category B	13887	Upload another image
Queen Street, St Andrew's Church Of Scotland Parish Church Including Boundary Walls, Railings And Gates				57°30′31″N 1°47′00″W	Category C(S)	50145	Upload Photo
Fish-House, Golf Road				57°30′57″N 1°47′51″W	Category B	39847	Upload another image
Buchan Fishing Development Company, Bridge Street And 2-6 Farmers Lane				57°30′17″N 1°46′23″W	Category C(S)	39737	Upload Photo
4 Harbour Street				57°30′11″N 1°46′31″W	Category B	39742	Upload Photo
5 Harbour Street				57°30′11″N 1°46′31″W	Category B	39743	Upload Photo
23-25 Harbour Street And 1-3 James Street				57°30′14″N 1°46′27″W	Category B	39749	Upload Photo
Bay View, 15 Charlotte Street				57°30′15″N 1°46′50″W	Category C(S)	39758	Upload Photo
11 Jamaica Street				57°30′13″N 1°46′33″W	Category B	39771	Upload Photo
31 Merchant Street				57°30′13″N 1°46′39″W	Category B	39791	Upload Photo
6 Merchant Street				57°30′16″N 1°46′41″W	Category C(S)	39800	Upload Photo
20 Merchant St Street				57°30′14″N 1°46′41″W	Category C(S)	39805	Upload Photo
24 Merchant Street				57°30′13″N 1°46′40″W	Category C(S)	39808	Upload Photo
2-4 Errol Street				57°30′20″N 1°46′54″W	Category B	39815	Upload Photo
78-80 Queen Street				57°30′28″N 1°46′56″W	Category C(S)	39824	Upload Photo
Infants School 16 Prince Street ("The Chuckney School")				57°30′23″N 1°46′52″W	Category B	39826	Upload another image
8 North Street				57°30′30″N 1°46′38″W	Category C(S)	39829	Upload Photo
Old St. Peter's Church				57°30′16″N 1°47′26″W	Category A	39668	Upload another image
Old St. Peter's Graveyard				57°30′16″N 1°47′27″W	Category B	39669	Upload another image
Peterhead Old Parish Church				57°30′18″N 1°46′58″W	Category A	39671	Upload another image
59 Broad Street				57°30′18″N 1°46′32″W	Category B	39681	Upload another image
73, 75 Broad Street Former Clydesdale Bank				57°30′18″N 1°46′30″W	Category B	39684	Upload another image
27 St. Andrews Street And 14 Uphill Lane				57°30′15″N 1°46′43″W	Category C(S)	39706	Upload Photo
9-11 Maiden Street				57°30′15″N 1°46′46″W	Category B	39717	Upload Photo
25, 27 Maiden Street				57°30′16″N 1°46′49″W	Category C(S)	39721	Upload Photo
4 Queen's Road				57°28′17″N 1°46′40″W	Category C(S)	19796	Upload Photo
9, 10, 11, 12 High Street, Burnhaven				57°29′14″N 1°47′28″W	Category B	16316	Upload Photo
15 Rocksley Drive				57°28′12″N 1°46′46″W	Category C(S)	16339	Upload Photo
5 Harbour Street				57°30′54″N 1°47′15″W	Category C(S)	16342	Upload Photo
5 Queen's Road				57°28′17″N 1°46′39″W	Category C(S)	16348	Upload Photo
13 Queen's Road				57°28′15″N 1°46′43″W	Category C(S)	16352	Upload Photo
5 Bridge Street				57°28′15″N 1°46′39″W	Category C(S)	16373	Upload Photo
6-12 Earl's Court				57°28′14″N 1°46′43″W	Category C(S)	16384	Upload Photo
14 Earl's Court				57°28′13″N 1°46′44″W	Category C(S)	16385	Upload Photo
12A Earls Court				57°28′15″N 1°46′42″W	Category B	13889	Upload Photo
28 North Street				57°30′33″N 1°46′38″W	Category C(S)	39833	Upload Photo
43 Maiden Street				57°30′16″N 1°46′54″W	Category C(S)	39724	Upload Photo
Caledonian Fish-Selling Company (North Block) Shiprow				57°30′13″N 1°46′19″W	Category B	39735	Upload Photo
Richard Irvin & Sons, Bridge Street				57°30′16″N 1°46′22″W	Category C(S)	39738	Upload Photo
Bath House, Bath Street Including Gates To Street				57°30′12″N 1°46′42″W	Category B	39751	Upload another image
2 Charlotte Street And 51, 53 Maiden Street				57°30′16″N 1°46′57″W	Category C(S)	39753	Upload Photo
11-14 Charlotte Street				57°30′15″N 1°46′52″W	Category C(S)	39757	Upload Photo
41 Merchant Street				57°30′12″N 1°46′39″W	Category C(S)	39794	Upload Photo
3, 5 St. Peter Street				57°30′19″N 1°47′05″W	Category B	39817	Upload Photo
St. Peter's R.C. Church And Presbytery 30 St. Peter Street				57°30′21″N 1°46′57″W	Category B	39818	Upload Photo
18-20 North Street				57°30′32″N 1°46′38″W	Category C(S)	39831	Upload Photo
Reform Monument, Broad Street				57°30′18″N 1°46′34″W	Category B	39673	Upload another image
53-55 Broad Street				57°30′18″N 1°46′32″W	Category C(S)	39680	Upload Photo
Former National Commercial Bank, 28 Broad Street				57°30′17″N 1°46′36″W	Category B	39688	Upload Photo
4, 6 St. Andrew Street				57°30′16″N 1°46′36″W	Category B	39707	Upload Photo
16 St. Andrew Street				57°30′15″N 1°46′38″W	Category C(S)	39709	Upload Photo
Richmond Farmhouse				57°30′09″N 1°49′21″W	Category C(S)	18960	Upload Photo
6, 7 Low Street, Burnhaven				57°29′13″N 1°47′28″W	Category B	16315	Upload Photo
7 Queen's Road				57°28′16″N 1°46′40″W	Category C(S)	16349	Upload Photo
11 Queen's Road				57°28′15″N 1°46′42″W	Category C(S)	16351	Upload Photo
Sandford Lodge Walled Garden				57°28′52″N 1°47′44″W	Category C(S)	16365	Upload Photo
3 Bridge Street				57°28′15″N 1°46′40″W	Category C(S)	16372	Upload Photo
Outbuildings Between 7 And 9 Earl's Court				57°28′14″N 1°46′39″W	Category C(S)	16379	Upload Photo

== Key ==
The scheme for classifying buildings in Scotland is:

- Category A: "buildings of national or international importance, either architectural or historic; or fine, little-altered examples of some particular period, style or building type."
- Category B: "buildings of regional or more than local importance; or major examples of some particular period, style or building type, which may have been altered."
- Category C: "buildings of local importance; lesser examples of any period, style, or building type, as originally constructed or moderately altered; and simple traditional buildings which group well with other listed buildings."

In March 2016 there were 47,288 listed buildings in Scotland. Of these, 8% were Category A, and 50% were Category B, with the remaining 42% being Category C.

== See also ==
- List of listed buildings in Aberdeenshire
