= Howe o'Buchan House =

Building in Scotland

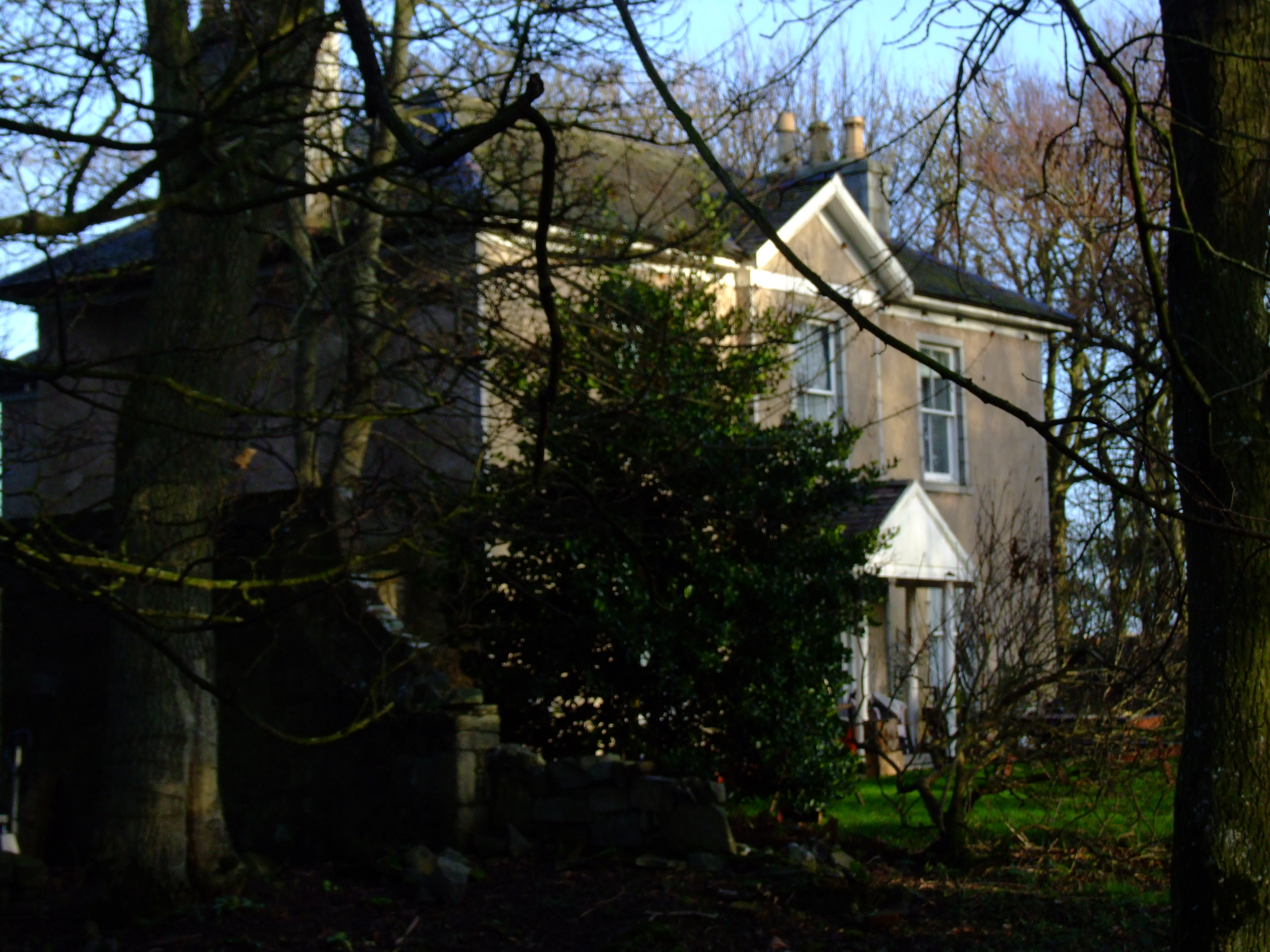
- The building in 2009
- Interactive map of the Howe o'Buchan House area

General information
- Location: Inverugie Road, Peterhead, Scotland
- Coordinates: 57.508163°N 1.825533°W
- Completed: 1840

Technical details
- Floor count: 2

The Howe o'Buchan House is a Category C listed building on Inverugie Road in Peterhead, Aberdeenshire, Scotland. It dates from 1840 (although an inscription of unknown origin above a door gives a date of 1711), and is a two-storey residential building. The house contains a marble chimneypiece that dates from circa 1805. It also contains a sculptured panel and bannisters which originated from Brucklay Castle.

By 1853, Howe o'Buchan was the home of Thomas Walker, one of four brothers whose family had originated at Waulkmill and Bankhead in New Aberdour who between them owned the neighbouring estates of Richmond, Balmore, Grange and Howe o'Buchan. When Peterhead railway station opened, the water needed for the engines was pumped from Howe o'Buchan.

== Gallery ==
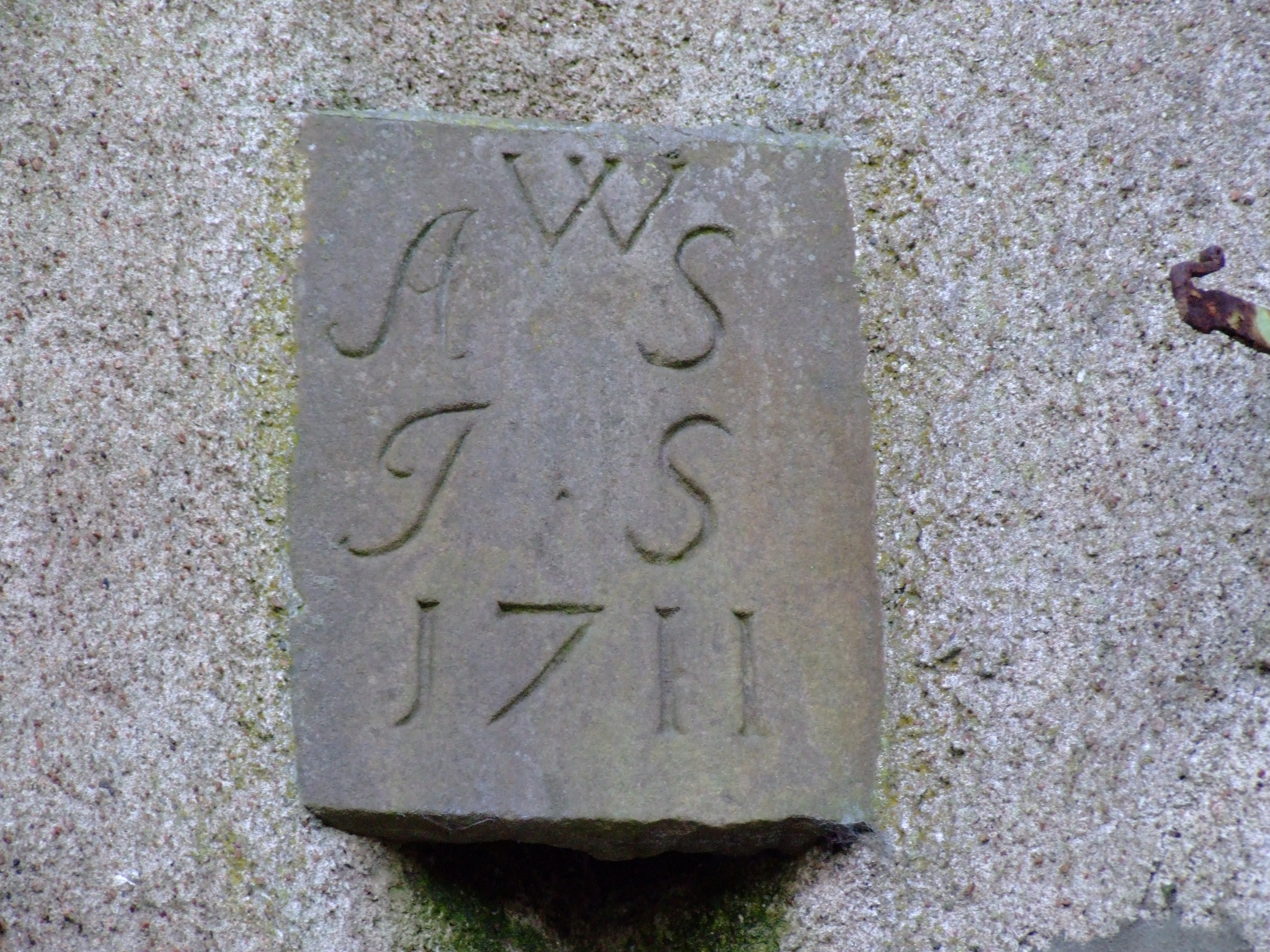
The inscription above a door. Its origin, and whether or not it relates to the house, is unknown

== See also ==
- List of listed buildings in Peterhead, Aberdeenshire
