= Kirkburn House =

- Interactive map of the Kirkburn House area

General information
- Location: Peterhead, Scotland
- Coordinates: 57.505279°N 1.791473°W
- Completed: c. 1845

Technical details
- Floor count: 2

Kirkburn House is a Category B listed building on South Road in Peterhead, Aberdeenshire, Scotland. It was the manse for the adjacent, now-ruined Old St Peter's Church. Its name refers to the now-culverted burn in the hollow alongside the building.

== See also ==
- List of listed buildings in Peterhead, Aberdeenshire
