= List of listed buildings in Rathen, Aberdeenshire =

This is a list of listed buildings in the parish of Rathen in Aberdeenshire, Scotland.

== List ==
Name	Location	Date Listed	Grid Ref. (Note: Sometimes known as OSGB36, the grid reference (where provided) is based on the British national grid reference system used by the Ordnance Survey. • "Guide to National Grid". Ordnance Survey. • "Get-a-map". Ordnance Survey.)	Geo-coordinates	Notes	LB Number (Note: Historic Environment Scotland assign a unique alphanumeric identifier to each designated site in Scotland, for listed buildings this always begins with "LB", for example "LB12345".)	Image
House Of Auchiries				57°38′10″N 2°02′22″W	Category B	16119	Upload Photo
Inverallochy Parish Church				57°40′31″N 1°55′50″W	Category C(S)	16144	Upload Photo
Rathen (West) Parish Church				57°38′17″N 2°00′04″W	Category C(S)	16138	Upload Photo
Old Parish Churchyard				57°38′19″N 1°59′59″W	Category C(S)	16140	Upload Photo
Rathen Manse				57°38′20″N 2°00′00″W	Category C(S)	16141	Upload Photo
Mormond (Cortes) House				57°37′31″N 2°00′07″W	Category B	19778	Upload Photo
House Of Auchiries Bridge Over Auchiries Burn				57°38′12″N 2°02′32″W	Category C(S)	16120	Upload Photo
House Of Memsie				57°38′28″N 2°02′49″W	Category A	16146	Upload Photo
Inverallochy Castle				57°39′23″N 1°56′00″W	Category B	13881	Upload Photo
Inverallochy 1 Charles Street				57°40′30″N 1°55′39″W	Category C(S)	19779	Upload Photo
Old Parish Church Of St. Ethernan, Rathen				57°38′19″N 1°59′59″W	Category B	16139	Upload Photo
Old Bridge Of Memsie Over Water Of Philorth				57°38′47″N 2°02′29″W	Category C(S)	16147	Upload Photo
West Lodge, Mormond (Cortes) House				57°37′45″N 2°00′08″W	Category C(S)	16121	Upload Photo
Rathen Manse Offices				57°38′21″N 1°59′57″W	Category C(S)	16142	Upload Photo
Cairnbulg Castle				57°39′56″N 1°58′24″W	Category A	16143	Upload Photo
Inverallochy 26 Shore Street ("Maggie's Hoosie")				57°40′37″N 1°55′48″W	Category B	16145	Upload Photo

== Key ==
The scheme for classifying buildings in Scotland is:

- Category A: "buildings of national or international importance, either architectural or historic; or fine, little-altered examples of some particular period, style or building type."
- Category B: "buildings of regional or more than local importance; or major examples of some particular period, style or building type, which may have been altered."
- Category C: "buildings of local importance; lesser examples of any period, style, or building type, as originally constructed or moderately altered; and simple traditional buildings which group well with other listed buildings."

In March 2016 there were 47,288 listed buildings in Scotland. Of these, 8% were Category A, and 50% were Category B, with the remaining 42% being Category C.

== See also ==
- List of listed buildings in Aberdeenshire
