= Rescue from SS William Hope =

1884 beaching of steamship

Coordinates: 57°40′17″N 2°11′9″W

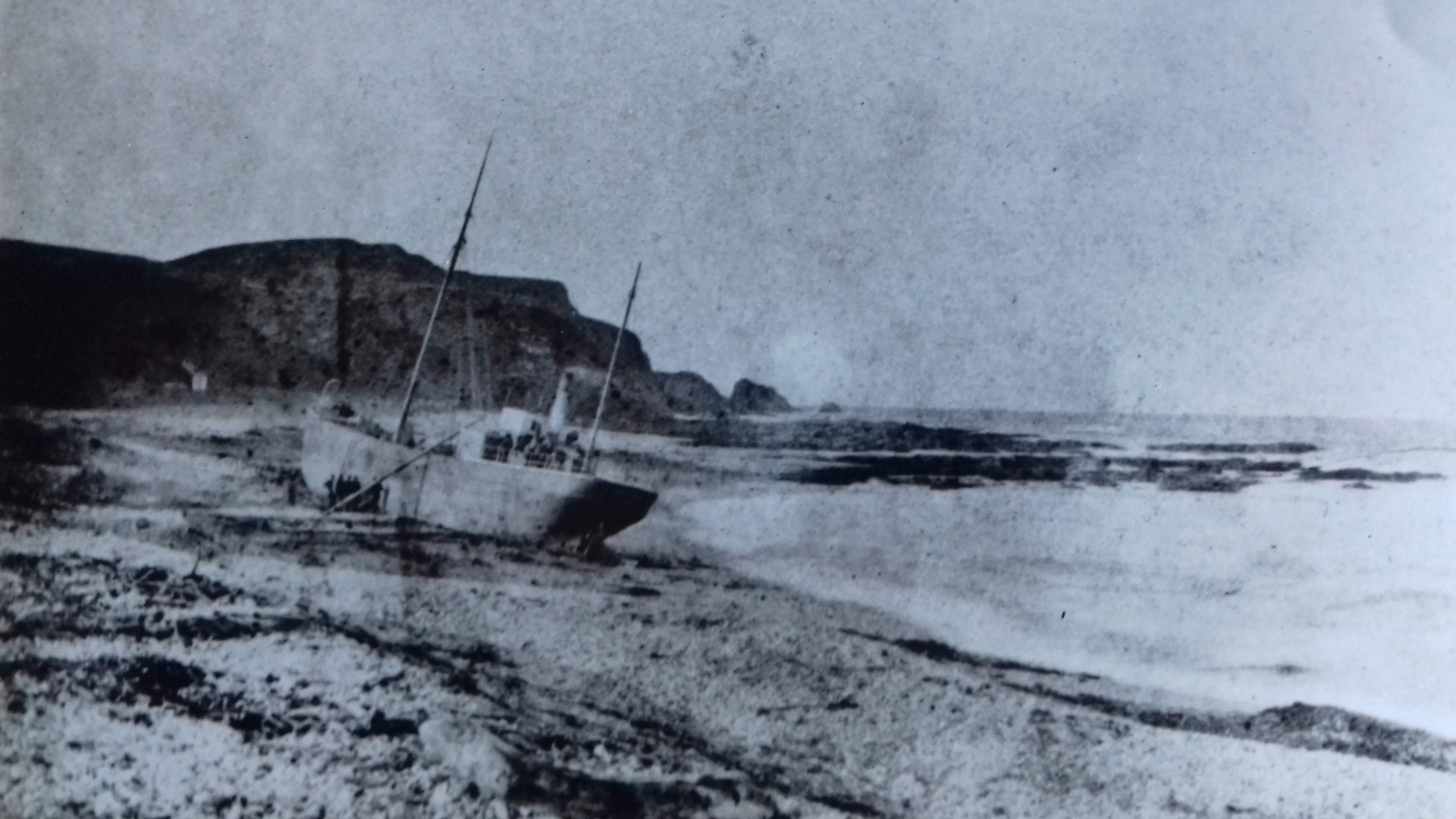
SS William Hope after beaching

In the 1884 rescue from SS William Hope in Aberdour Bay off the north coast of Aberdeenshire in Scotland Jane Whyte rescued fifteen sailors from their ship in conditions described as "blowing a hurricane".

On 28 October 1884 SS William Hope was sailing from Fraserburgh to Burghead carrying only ballast. Caught off Troup Head by a shift in the wind in severe conditions the captain headed into Aberdour Bay where its steam engine failed and anchor chain broke.

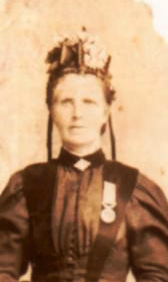
Jane Whyte

When the ship was drifting towards rocks on the shore Jane Whyte, (Note: Whyte was born 1844 and died 3 August 1918) a 40-year-old mother of nine (Note: Some sources say she had eight children.) and wife of a farm worker, was walking her dog along the beach. Whyte waded into the sea and caught a rope thrown towards her. Winding it round her waist, she pulled back to the shore and held it firmly while all fifteen sailors struggled to reach land one at a time. She then gave them shelter overnight until they were able to return to Dundee.

Whyte was awarded the RNLI silver medal for outstanding bravery and a Board of Trade bronze medal of gallantry. With her £10 reward she was able to purchase her rented croft. The ship, an iron fishing trawler built in 1882, was wrecked and sold to be broken up.
