= Memsie Cairn =

Bronze Age cairn in Scotland

- Round Cairn Of Memsie
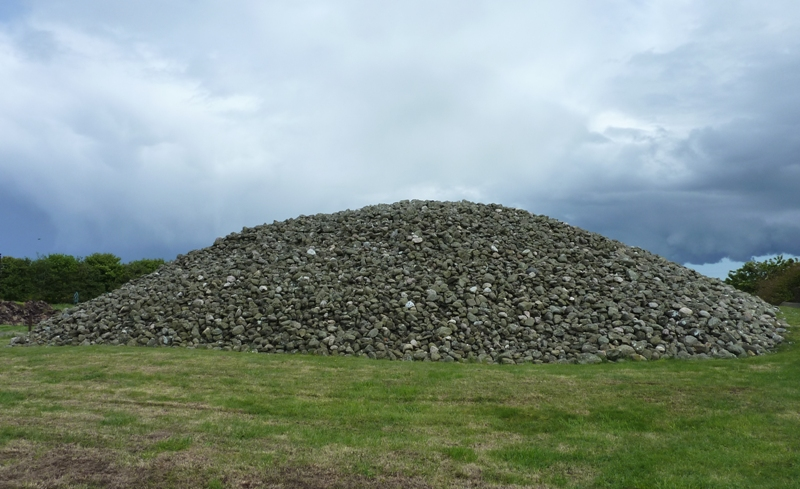
- Memsie Cairn in May 2011
- Interactive map of Memsie Cairn
- 57.6483°N 2.0409°W
- Type: Cairn
- Periods: Bronze Age-Medieval
- Location: Memsie, near Fraserburgh, Aberdeenshire, Scotland
- Part of: Cairns of Memsie (Sole surviving cairn)

History
- Built: c. 2000 BC

Site notes
- Material: Stone
- Height: 4.4 m (14 ft)
- Diameter: 24 m (79 ft)
- Management: Historic Environment Scotland
- Public access: Yes
- Website: Historic Environment Scotland

Scheduled monument
- Official name: Cairn of Memsie
- Type: Prehistoric ritual and funerary: cairn
- Designated: 14 March 1994
- Reference no.: SM90216

Memsie Cairn is an ancient cairn in Memsie, near Fraserburgh, Aberdeenshire, Scotland. It is the last remaining cairn of the § Cairns Of Memsie.

The burial cairn was constructed during the Bronze Age and finds from the site suggest it was used up into the Medieval period. It is a scheduled monument managed by Historic Environment Scotland.

== Archaeological Finds ==
Prior to 1780 a cairn was dug into with human bones found at the centre. Several of the stones had been burnt and almost vitrified. In 1790 it was reported that a stone cist, flint dart-head and a block of flint were found within one of the large cairns.

In 1827 several items found within one of the cairns was donated to the National Museum of Scotland § National Museum of Antiquities of Scotland. These items included an urn containing calcined bones, several human skulls, and an iron short sword with wooden scabbard. The whereabouts of the sword are unknown and may no longer exist.

In June 2022 an excavation nearby the Memsie Cairn took place prior to the construction of a new house. Several finds were found including four postholes, hearth/fire-pit, pit, prehistoric pottery sherds, and several pieces of struck quartz and flint.

== Cairns Of Memsie ==
The Cairns Of Memsie was a cemetery of burial cairns including three large cairns separated by about 100 metres and contained many smaller cairns. In 1723 each of the large cairns were measured to be approximately 30 m in diameter and 12 m in height.

Since then two of the cairns have been destroyed and the Memsie Cairn has reduced in size. The robbed stones were likely used as building materials for field boundary walls.

== See also ==
- House of Memsie
- List of Historic Environment Scotland properties
