= Boddam Castle =

Castle in Aberdeenshire, Scotland

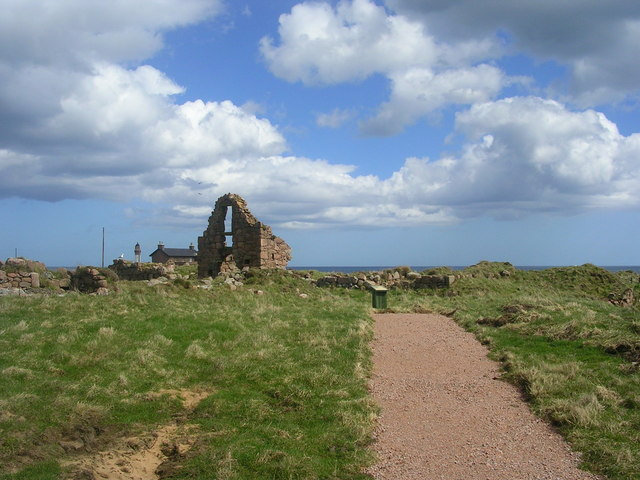
- Looking northeast. Buchan Ness Lighthouse is visible in the background on the left
- Interactive map of Boddam Castle
- Location: Boddam, Aberdeenshire, Scotland, UK
- Coordinates: 57°27′58.6″N 1°46′53.3″W
- Built: early 16th century

Scheduled monument
- Official name: Boddam Castle
- Type: Secular: castle
- Designated: 26 December 1972
- Reference no.: SM3252

Boddam Castle is a ruined castle in Boddam, Aberdeenshire, on the coast of north-east Scotland. It was thought to have been built in the early 16th century as a seat for the Keiths of Ludquharn. It is a scheduled monument and was a Category B listed structure until its listed status was removed in 2015 due to dual designation. Only slight remains survive, chiefly parts of a gatehouse with a semi-circular moulded archway and a window with a relieving arch above.

Parts of the castle's cannons were still lying sunk in the bank as late as 1776.

== See also ==
- List of listed buildings in Peterhead, Aberdeenshire
