= Boddam Masonic Hall =

Building in Boddam, Aberdeenshire

- Location within Aberdeenshire

General information
- Location: Boddam, Aberdeenshire, 5–9 Rocksley Drive, Scotland
- Coordinates: 57°28′12″N 1°46′46″W

Other information
- Public transit: Aberdeen

Website
- www.colintraivehotel.com

Boddam Masonic Hall is an historic building in Boddam, Aberdeenshire, Scotland. It is a Category B listed structure, located a few hundred yards west of Buchan Ness Lighthouse.

== See also ==
- List of listed buildings in Peterhead, Aberdeenshire
