= 1 Harbour Street, Peterhead =

Building in Peterhead, Aberdeenshire, Scotland

1 Harbour Street
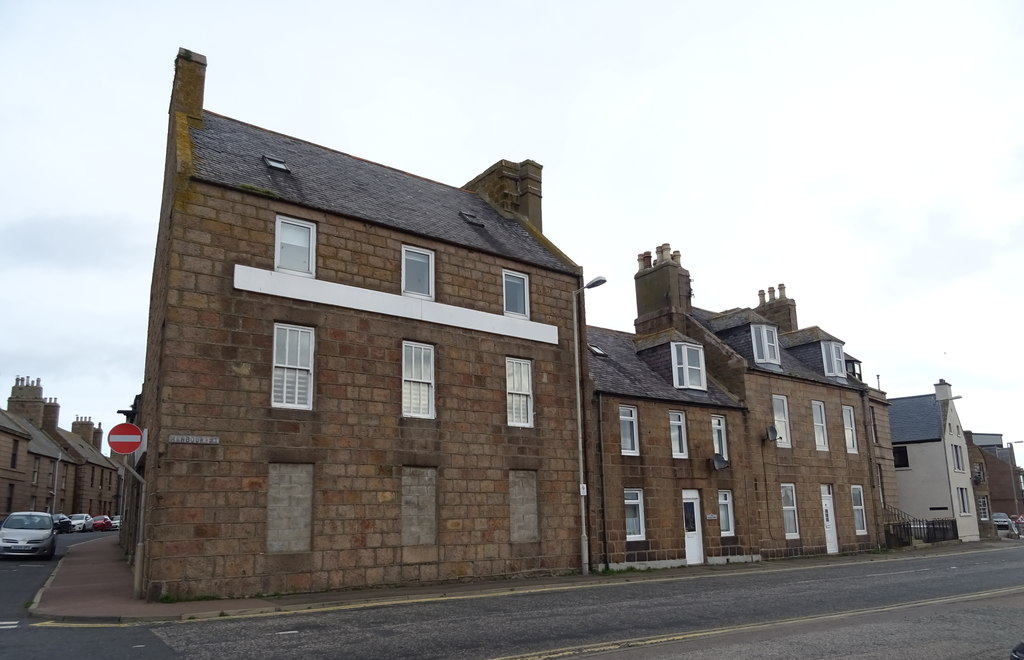
- The building in 2020
- Interactive map of the 1 Harbour Street area

General information
- Location: Peterhead, Scotland
- Coordinates: 57.502893°N 1.775743°W
- Completed: Late 18th century

Technical details
- Floor count: 3

1 Harbour Street is a Category B listed building in Peterhead, Aberdeenshire, Scotland. Dating to the late 18th century, the building stands at the corner of Jamaica Street, onto which the property's garage faces.

Harbour Street was, in 1739, described as "presently a building". The footprint of the building is clearly shown on the Ordnance Survey's large scale Scottish town plan, surveyed in 1868.

The building, along with its adjacent garage, was officially designated as a Category B listed structure on 16 April 1971.

== See also ==
- List of listed buildings in Peterhead, Aberdeenshire
