= Memsie =

Coordinates: 57.65°N 2.05°W

Memsie: Scottish Gaelic: Mam Sìdh
- Location within Aberdeenshire
- OS grid reference: NJ971624
- Council area: Aberdeenshire
- Lieutenancy area: Aberdeenshire
- Country: Scotland
- Sovereign state: United Kingdom
- Post town: FRASERBURGH
- Postcode district: AB43
- Dialling code: 01346
- Police: Scotland
- Fire: Scottish
- Ambulance: Scottish
- UK Parliament: Aberdeenshire North and Moray East
- Scottish Parliament: Banffshire and Buchan Coast

Memsie, Aberdeenshire, is a small community near Fraserburgh, Scotland. On Memsie Moor there is a very large stone cairn, Memsie Cairn, which has been opened, but nothing found inside. There were two other cairns, but they have been removed. Apart from the cairn, Memsie is near Mormond Hill, which was a very large listening post in the Cold War. These days the former listening post is used for satellite communications. The nearest Kirk to Memsie is in Rathen.

The House of Memsie is located east of the A981 to the south of the community.
