= Aberdour House (Aberdeenshire) =

Category A listed house in New Aberdour, Aberdeenshire

- Interactive map of the Aberdour House area

General information
- Location: New Aberdour, Aberdeenshire, Scotland
- Coordinates: 57.6671°N 2.15260°W
- Completed: c. 1740
- Owner: Robin Mackinlay (since 1992)

Technical details
- Floor count: 3

Aberdour House is a Category A listed country house in New Aberdour, Aberdeenshire, Scotland. Dating to around 1740, it was built by John Forbes, of Knappernay.

Historian Charles McKean describes House of Memsie as a "smaller and more decorative version of Aberdour House".

== See also ==
- List of listed buildings in Aberdeenshire
