= Rathen railway station =

Disused railway station in Rathen, Aberdeenshire

Coordinates: 57.6517°N 1.9748°W

Rathen
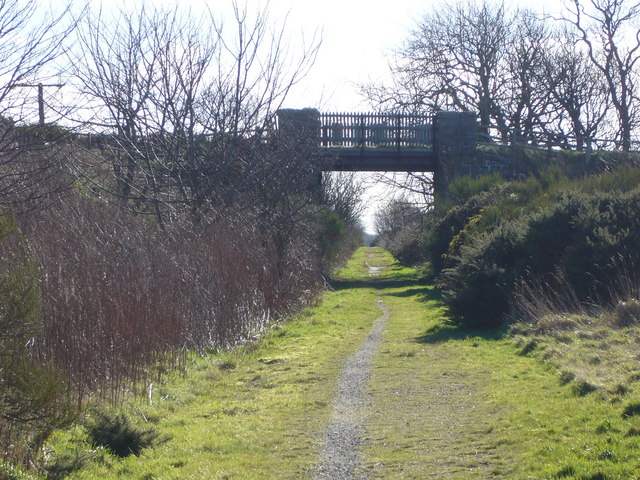
- The old line is now used for recreational purposes

General information
- Location: Rathen, Aberdeenshire; Scotland
- Platforms: 1

Other information
- Status: Disused

History
- Original company: Formartine and Buchan Railway
- Pre-grouping: Great North of Scotland Railway
- Post-grouping: London and North Eastern Railway

Key dates
- 24 April 1865: Opened
- 4 October 1965: Closed
Location

Rathen railway station was a railway station in Rathen, Aberdeenshire, on the defunct Formartine and Buchan Railway in northeast Scotland.

== History ==
The station was opened on 24 April 1865 by the Formartine and Buchan Railway. It had a signal box in 1894, although it closed quickly and was reduced to a ground frame. The station building was on the west side and on the east side was the goods yard. The station closed on 4 October 1965.

Preceding station	Disused railways	Following station
Philorth; Line and station closed	Great North of Scotland Railway; Formartine and Buchan Railway	Lonmay; Line and station closed
