= William Smith (architect) =

Scottish architect

William Smith (16 September 1817 – 22 December 1891) was a Scottish architect. He was a son of John Smith, also an architect, and his mother was Margaret Grant. A partner in the Aberdonian firms J & W Smith (1845–1879), W & J Smith (1879–1887) and W & J Smith and Kelly (1887–1891), and employed as Aberdeen's superintendent of works (1852–1891), he designed a large number of buildings in north east Scotland.

== Ancestry and early life ==
Smith was the fourth child of the Aberdeen architect John Smith and the grandson of builder/architect William (Sink 'em) Smith. He attended Aberdeen Grammar School and James Giles tutored him in watercolouring and sketching. He worked with his father and Robert Kerr before spending 18 months in London assisting and receiving further training from Thomas Donaldson. Between the summer of 1842 and early 1845 Smith spent almost two years travelling around Greece and Italy.

== Career ==
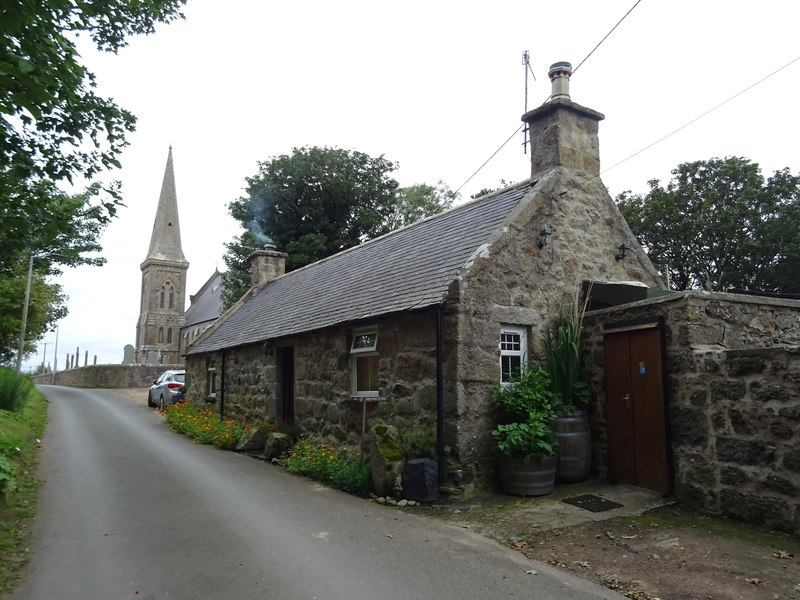
Rathen Parish Kirk, designed by Smith and erected in 1868, and an adjacent but and ben

Smith entered his father's firm as a Senior Assistant, becoming a partner in 1845. His first principal commission in Aberdeen was Trinity Hall on Union Street for the Seven Incorporated Trades of Aberdeen. The foundation of this Tudor Gothic style building – the first of this style built on Union Street – was laid on 9 June 1846.

A prolific designer of manses, including those at Peterhead, Tarland, Methlick, St Fergus and Woodside, some of his other major commissions include Fraserburgh Prison (1845), King Street Iron Works, Aberdeen (1847), Badentoy House (1849), Drumside House (before 1852), Balmoral Castle (1852), Alexander Scott's Hospital, Huntly (1853), Miller's Institution, Thurso (1859), the Anderson Institute, Lerwick (1860) and Rathen Parish Church. Rosemount Parish Church (1890)

As his father's health deteriorated, Smith assumed greater responsibility within the company and on his father's death in 1852 also took over his father's position of Aberdeen City Architect.

== Death and legacy ==
On 27 September 1826 Smith married Mary Blaikie (27 September 1826 – 21 January 1883), the daughter of a prominent Aberdeen family. The couple had 16 children but only eight survived. Their eldest son, John (5 July 1847 – 11 April 1887) also became an architect.

Smith died of bronchitis at his home in King Street, Aberdeen, on 22 December 1891. His manner was described in his obituary as "quiet and retiring" and "reticent to the point of shyness".

== List of works ==
Scotland

- Badentoy House, Aberdeen, Aberdeenshire (1849)
- King Street Iron Works, Aberdeen, Aberdeenshire (1847)
- St. Mark's Church, Rosemount, Aberdeenshire (1890)
- Balmoral Castle, Crathie, Aberdeenshire (1852)
- Alexander Scott's Hospital, Huntly, Aberdeenshire (1853)
- Fraserburgh Prison, Peterhead, Aberdeenshire (1845)
- St. Peter's Manse, Peterhead, Aberdeenshire
- St. Ethernan's Church, Rathen, Aberdeenshire
- St. Moluag's Manse, Tarland, Aberdeenshire
- Miller's Academy, Thurso, Caithness (1859)
- Drumside House, Crieff, Perthshire (1852)
- Anderson Institute, Lerwick, Shetland (1860)
- Peterhead Sheriff Court (1871)

England

- Christ Church, Fulmodeston, Norfolk
