= Rathen, Aberdeenshire =

Coordinates: 57.63338°N 2.00198°W

Rathen
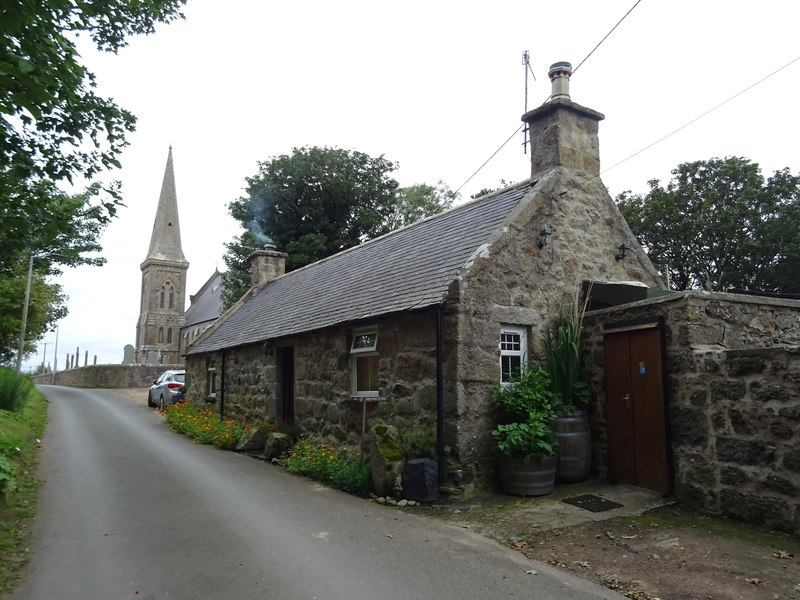
- Rathen Kirk and adjacent but and ben

- Location within Aberdeenshire
- OS grid reference: NK000607
- Council area: Aberdeenshire
- Lieutenancy area: Aberdeenshire
- Country: Scotland
- Sovereign state: United Kingdom
- Post town: FRASERBURGH
- Postcode district: AB43
- Dialling code: 01346
- Police: Scotland
- Fire: Scottish
- Ambulance: Scottish
- UK Parliament: Aberdeenshire North and Moray East
- Scottish Parliament: Banffshire and Buchan Coast

Rathen is a parish and hamlet near Fraserburgh, Aberdeenshire, Scotland. In Scottish Gaelic, its name means fort on the river.

On the coast is Cairnbulg Point, flanking the eastern side of Fraserburgh Bay. Mormond Hill (769 feet (234 m)) sits on the borders of Rathen, Strichen and Lonmay. Rathen Burn runs through the parish for three miles.

The old kirk, St Ethernan's, is one of the most ancient in Aberdeenshire. The church was given, by Marjory, Countess of Buchan, to Arbroath Abbey in the 13th century. In 1328, Robert the Bruce, a year before his death, granted it to the college and canons of Old Machar. A sundial was added in the kirkyard in 1625, and the church's nave was erected by the Frasers of Memsie in 1646. While the belfry dates from 1782, its bell has the inscription Peter Jansen, 1643. Also in the kirkyard are the burials of the great great grandparents of the Norwegian composer Edvard Grieg.

The church was replaced in 1868 by a new construction, designed by William Smith, to the east of its predecessor.

There is also a free church, Inverallochy and Rathen East Church, two miles northeast of Rathen.

At the end of the 19th century, the main residence was Mormond House (formerly Cortese House), with House of Memsie being used as a farmhouse.

Rathen railway station formerly existed as part of the now-defunct Formartine and Buchan Railway.

== Gallery ==
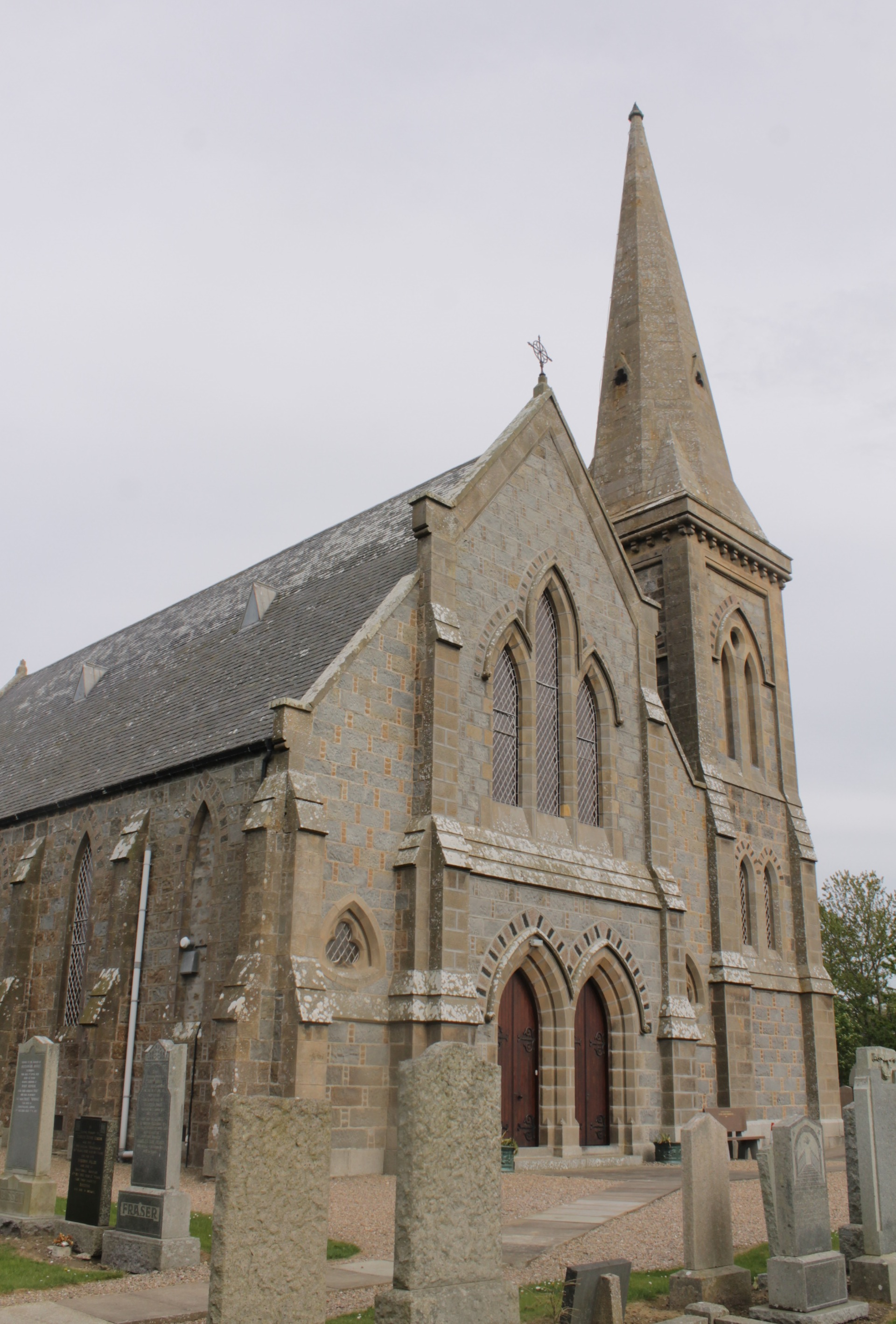
Rathen Parish Church

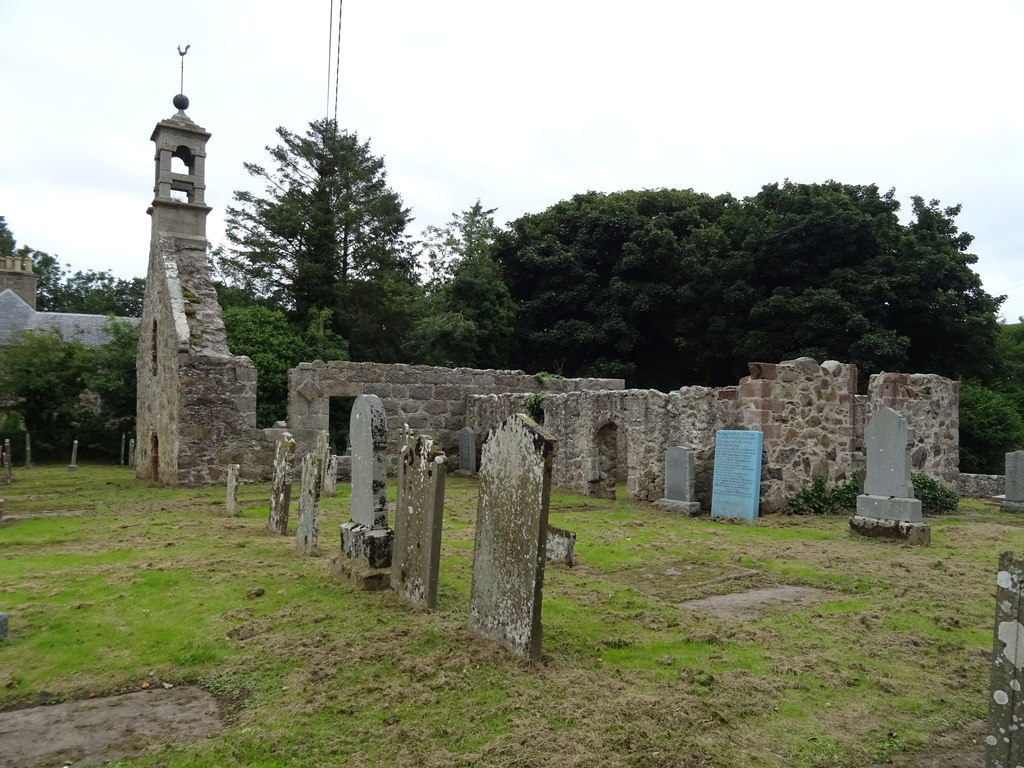
The remains of Rathen Old Kirk

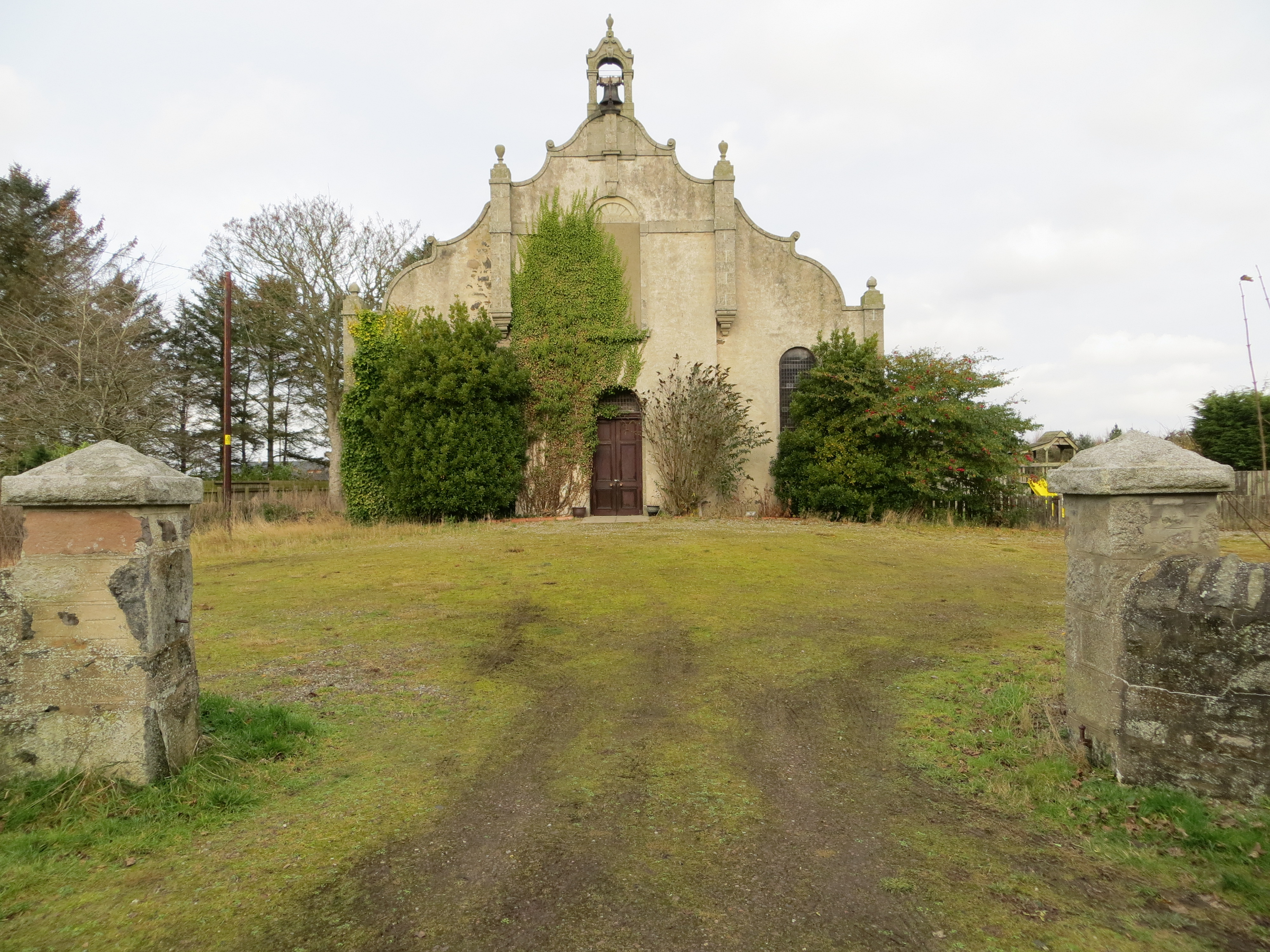
The former Rathen East Kirk in nearby Mosstown

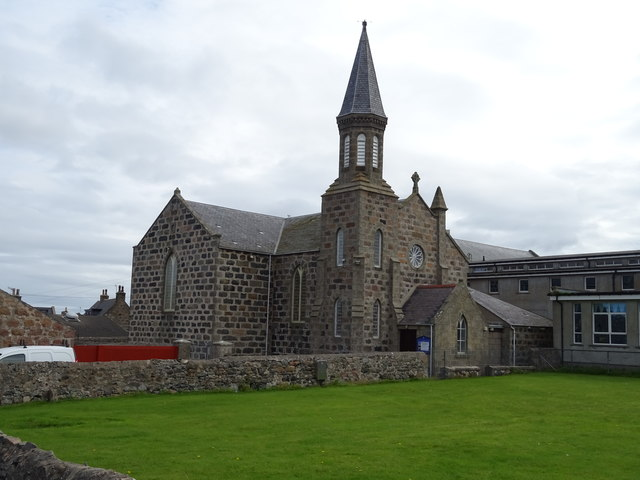
Inverallochy and Rathen East Church

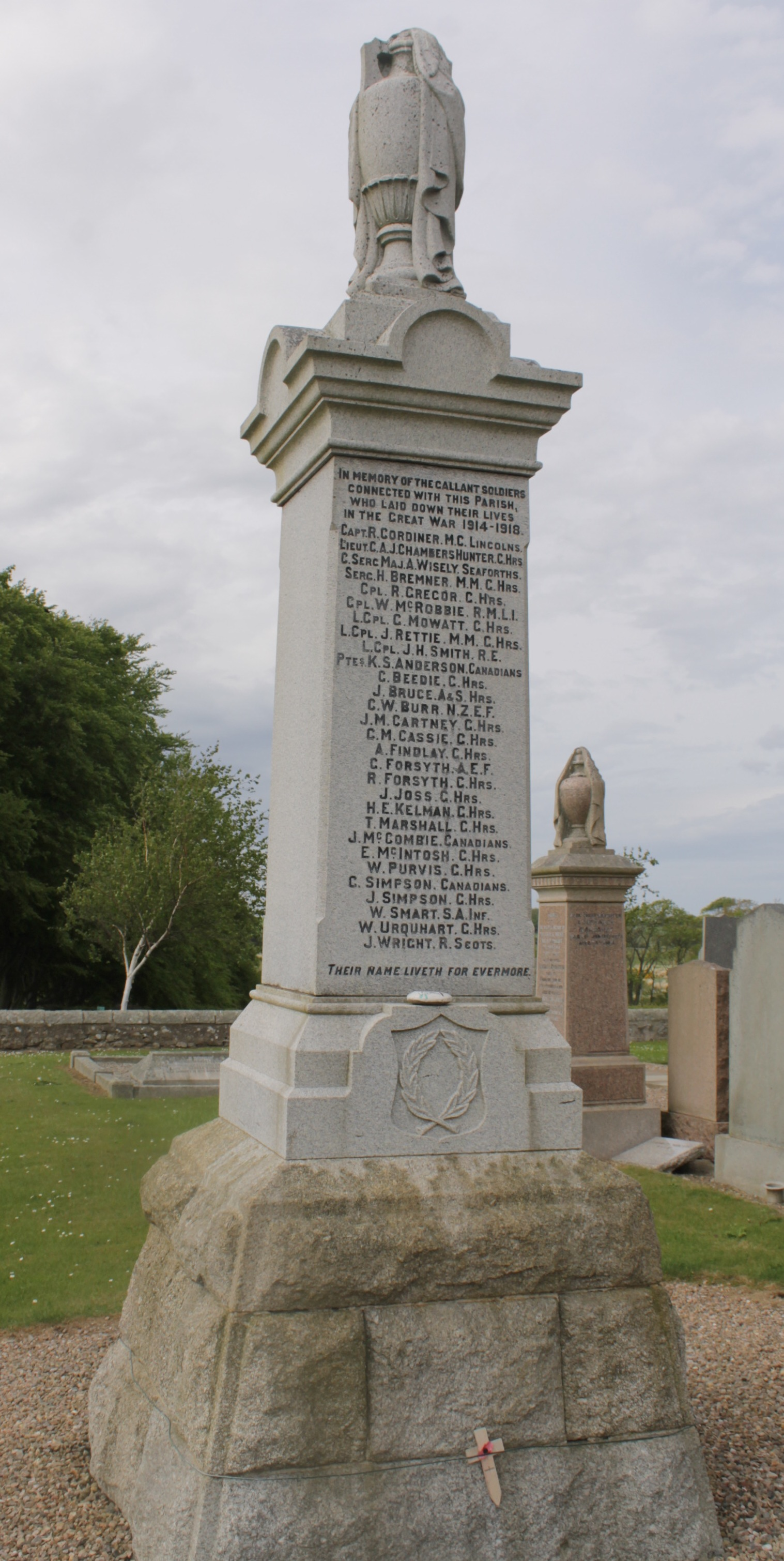
Rathen War Memorial
