= Brethren Meeting House =

Wesleyan church in Boddam, Aberdeenshire, Scotland

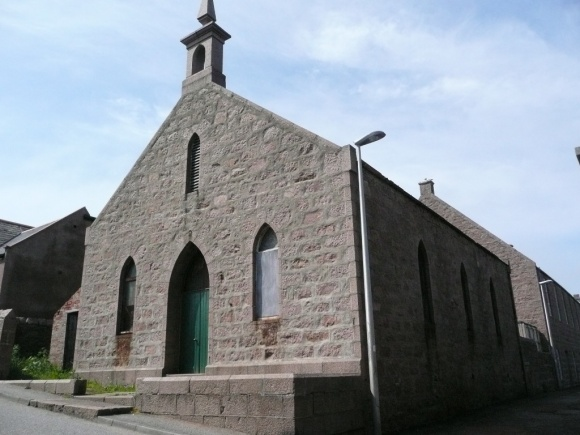
- View from the southeast
- Interactive map of the Brethren Meeting House area

General information
- Location: 26 Gordon Street, Peterhead, Scotland
- Coordinates: 57.471172°N 1.780494°W
- Completed: late-18th century

Technical details
- Floor count: 1

Brethren Meeting House is a Category C listed building at 26 Gordon Street in Boddam, Aberdeenshire, Scotland. It was formerly a late-Victorian-era Wesleyan church. A bellcote adorns the gable, without a bell but with a "spiky" finial in place.

== See also ==
- List of listed buildings in Peterhead, Aberdeenshire
