= Whitehill Lodge =

Building in Scotland

- Interactive map of the Whitehill Lodge area

General information
- Location: Damhead Way, Peterhead, Scotland
- Coordinates: 57.490972°N 1.813028°W
- Completed: early 19th century (later remodelled as Victorian)

Technical details
- Floor count: 1

Whitehill Lodge is a Category C listed building on Damhead Way in Peterhead, Aberdeenshire, Scotland. It is known to have been standing since at least the early 1870s, possibly earlier. Its prominent features are a log-column porch and decorative bargeboards.

A Gothic-style cottage named Dales, also on Damhead Way, dates to around 1800.

== See also ==
- List of listed buildings in Peterhead, Aberdeenshire
