= 4 Union Street, Peterhead =

House in Peterhead, Aberdeenshire, Scotland

4 Union Street
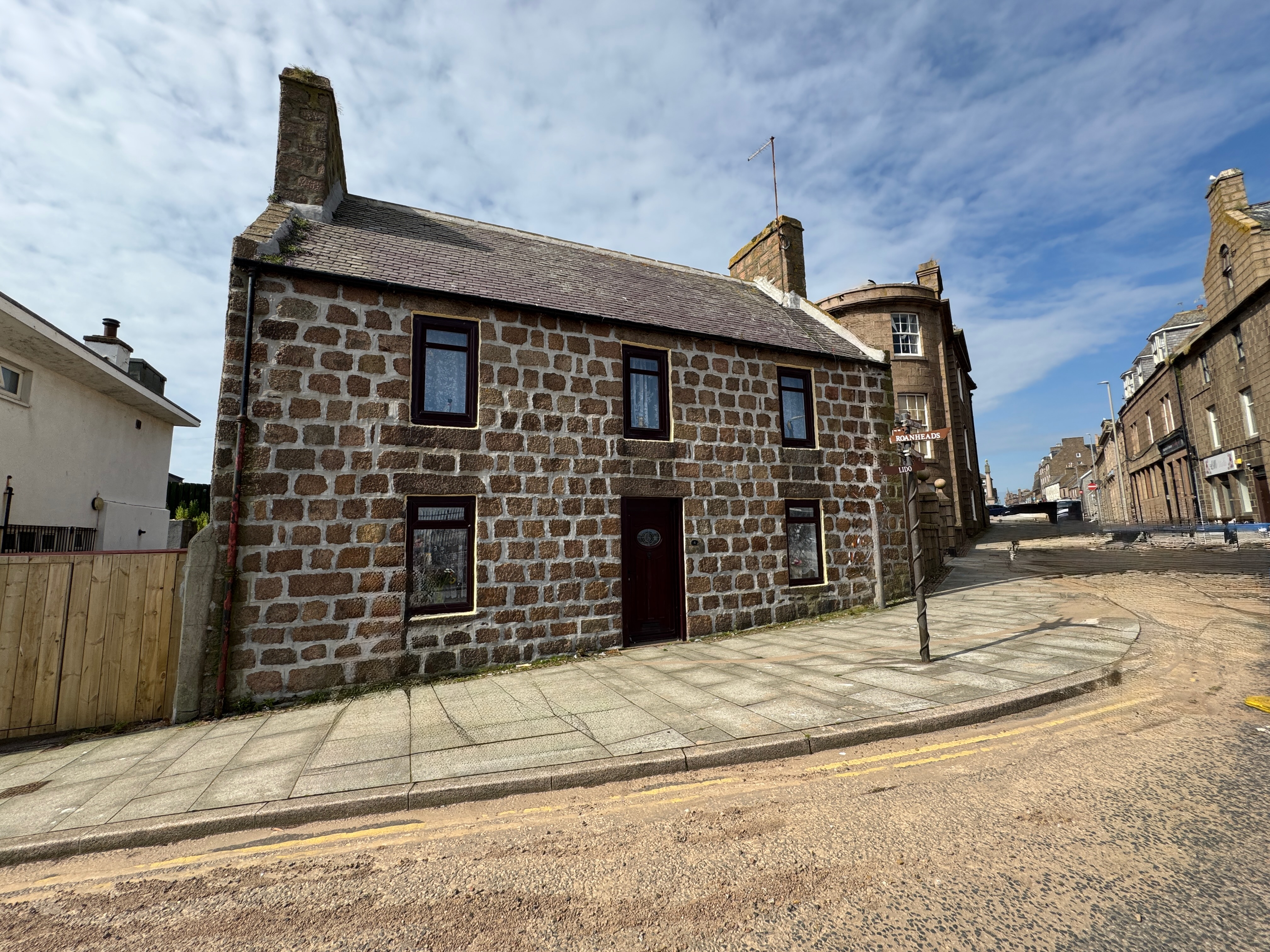
- The building in 2024
- Interactive map of the 4 Union Street area

General information
- Location: Peterhead, Scotland
- Coordinates: 57.504679°N 1.774073°W
- Completed: late 18th century

Technical details
- Floor count: 2

4 Union Street is a Category C listed building in Peterhead, Aberdeenshire, Scotland. Dating to the late 18th century, the residential building stands at the corner of Union Street, Broad Street and Seagate, to the west of the Fishermen's Mission and directly opposite Peterhead's dry dock. It sits behind Arbuthnot House, the town's former municipal chambers.

== See also ==
- List of listed buildings in Peterhead, Aberdeenshire
