= 10 Merchant Street, Peterhead =

Hotel in Aberdeenshire, Scotland

10 Merchant Street
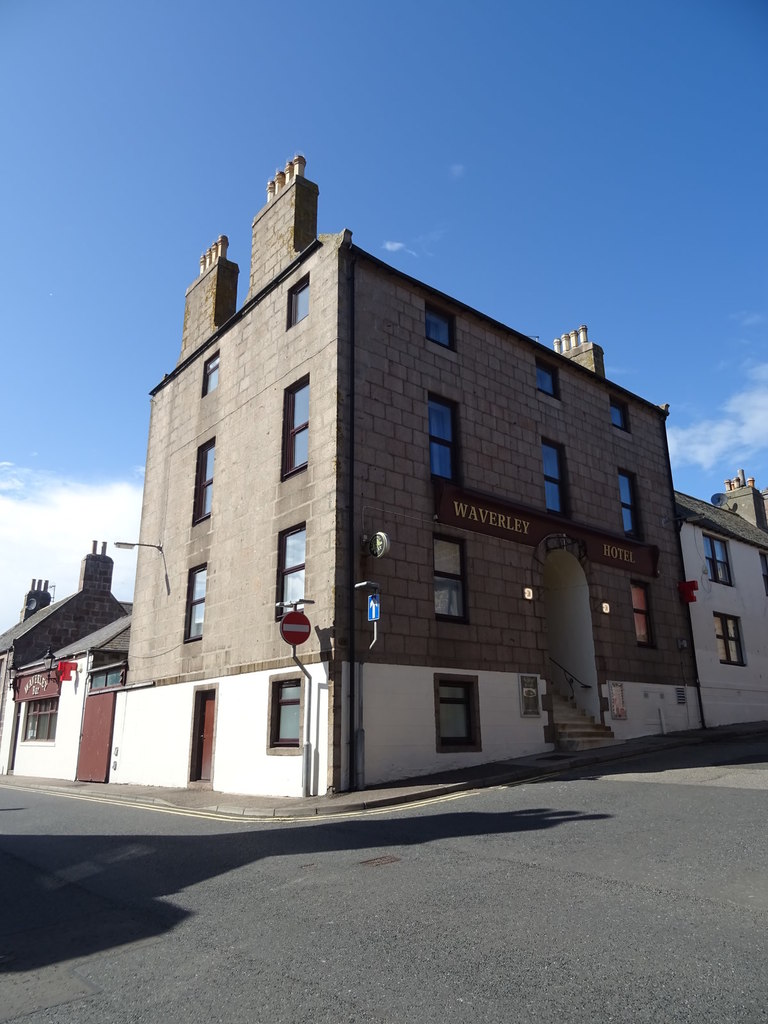
- The building in 2020
- Interactive map of the 10 Merchant Street area

General information
- Location: Peterhead, Scotland
- Coordinates: 57.504295°N 1.777847°W
- Completed: c. 1800
- Owner: Waverley Hotel Ltd.

Technical details
- Floor count: 3 (plus a basement)

10 Merchant Street is a Category B listed building in Peterhead, Aberdeenshire, Scotland. Dating to around 1800, the building, which stands at the corner of Merchant and St Andrew Streets, became the ten-room Waverley Hotel in 1886. It was originally the Royal Hotel. It is constructed of ashlar stone.

== See also ==
- List of listed buildings in Peterhead, Aberdeenshire
