= Drostan =

7th-century Scottish Christian saint

Saint Drostan
- Died: ~7th century
- Venerated in: Roman Catholic Church, Anglican Communion & Eastern Orthodox Church
- Major shrine: New Aberdour
- Feast: 11 July; 15 December

Saint Drostan (d. early 7th century), also known as Drustan, was the founder and abbot of the monastery of Old Deer in Aberdeenshire. His relics were later translated to the church at New Aberdour and his holy well lies nearby.

== Biography ==
Drostan was an Irish-Scottish abbot who flourished about A.D. 600. All that is known of him is found in the "Breviarium Aberdonense" and in the "Book of Deer", a ninth-century manuscript, now in the Cambridge University Library, but these two accounts do not agree in every particular. He appears to have belonged to the royal family of the Scoti, his father's name being Cosgrach. Showing signs of a religious vocation he was entrusted at an early age to the care of St. Columba, who trained him and gave him the monastic habit.

Drostan was one of the twelve companions who sailed from Ireland to Scotland around 563 with St Columba. These twelve became known as the 'Brethren of St Columba'. He accompanied that saint when he visited New Aberdour in Buchan (about 35 miles north of Aberdeen).

According to the Celtic legend, Columba, his disciple Drostan, and others, went from Iona into Buchan and established an important missionary centre at Deer on the banks of the Ugie on lands given him by the mormaer or chief of the district whose son he had by his prayers freed of a dangerous illness.

The Pictish ruler of that country gave them the site of Deir, fourteen miles farther inland, where they established a monastery, and when St. Columba returned to Iona he left St. Drostan there as abbot of the new foundation which some sources say received royal support because of its proximity to the Pictish capital of Craig Phadrig, near Inverness. On the death of the Abbot of Dalquhongale (Holywood) some few years later, St. Drostan was chosen to succeed him. Afterwards, feeling called to a life of greater seclusion, he resigned his abbacy, went farther north, and became a hermit at Glenesk. Here his sanctity attracted the poor and needy, and many miracles are ascribed to him, including the restoration of sight to a priest named Symon.

St. Drostan is credited as being the founder of the Chapel of St. Tear near Ackergill in Wick parish on the east coast of Caithness. It has been speculated that the name Tear might be a variant of Deer.

When St. Drostan died at Glen Esk his remains were conveyed back to Aberdour where they were deposited in a 'tumba lapidea' or stone coffin. Here his bones were said to work miraculous cures upon the sick and afflicted. The Breviary of Aberdeen celebrates his feast on 15 December. The monastery of Old Deer, which had fallen into decay, was rebuilt for Cistercian monks in 1213 and so continued until the Reformation.

== See also ==
- Picts

== Sources ==
- "St. Drostan", The Oxford Dictionary of Saints; ed. David Hugh Farmer; Oxford: Oxford University Press, 1987.
