= 16 Prince Street, Peterhead =

Building in Scotland

16 Prince Street
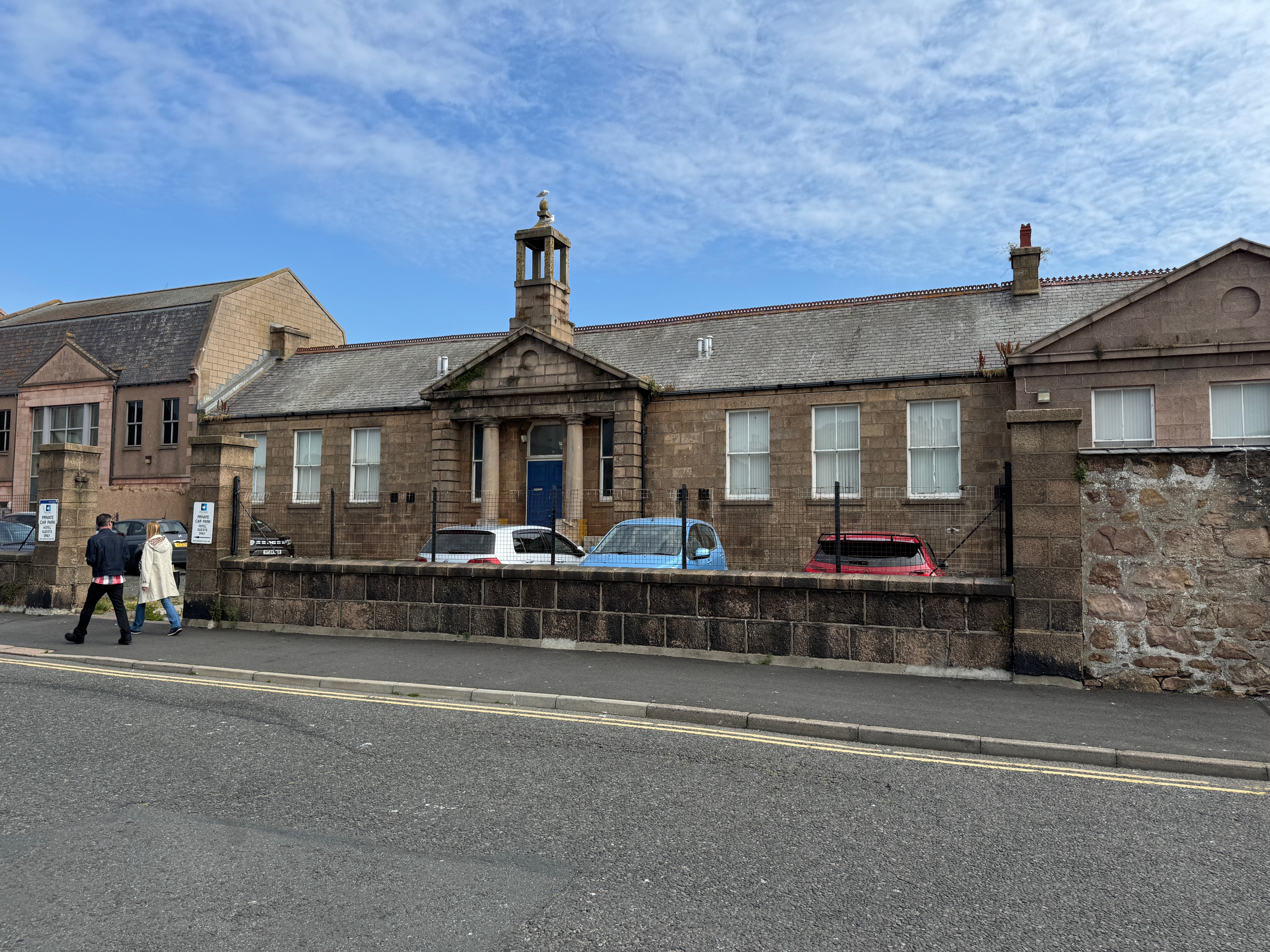
- The building in 2024
- Interactive map of the 16 Prince Street area

General information
- Location: Peterhead, Scotland
- Coordinates: 57.506357°N 1.781069°W
- Completed: 1838

16 Prince Street is a Category B listed building in Peterhead, Aberdeenshire, Scotland. It dates from 1838. It was formerly Peterhead's infant school, colloquially known as the Chuckney School. Today it is an office building for Aberdeenshire Council.

Described by architectural historians David Walker and Matthew Woodworth as "a temple to education", the building's front elevation presents a single symmetrical storey, made of granite ashlar and with a central portico in the Roman Doric style, the pediment of which is surmounted by a bellcote. Extending to either side of this are wings of three bays. It was originally T-plan in shape, with a third wing extending back from the entrance, but has been greatly extended since its construction.

== See also ==
- List of listed buildings in Peterhead, Aberdeenshire
