= Bath House, Peterhead =

Building in Aberdeenshire, Scotland

Bath House
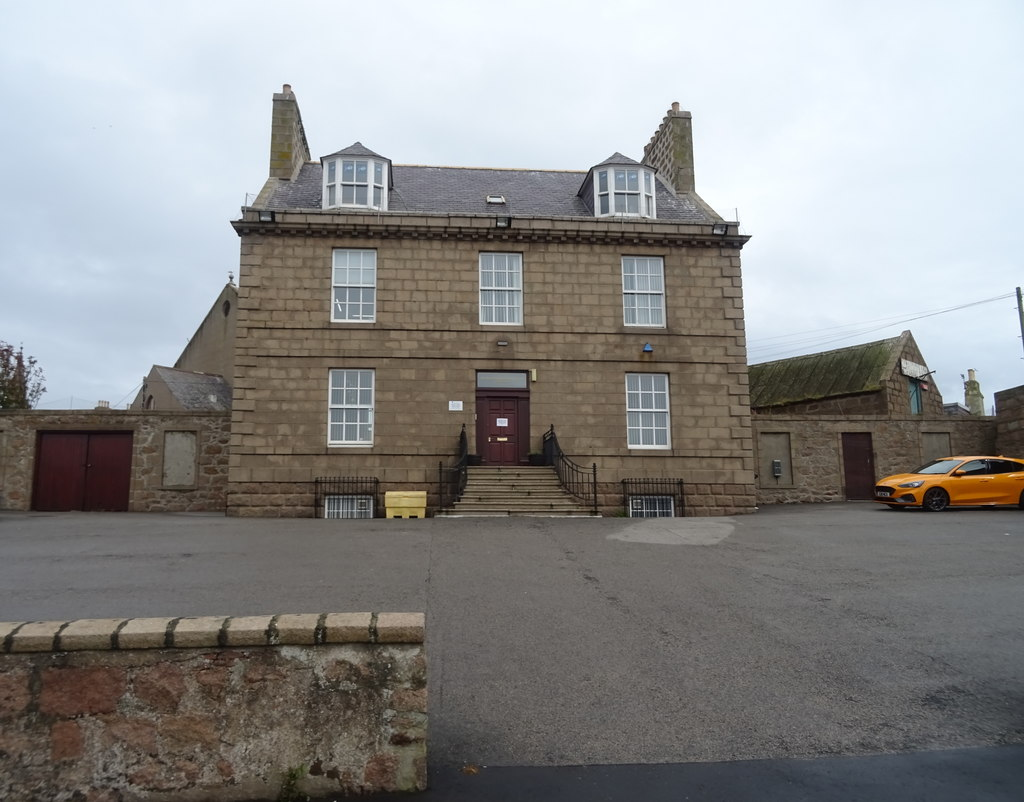
- The building in 2020
- Interactive map of the Bath House area

General information
- Location: 7 Bath Street, Peterhead, Scotland
- Coordinates: 57°30′12″N 1°46′42″W
- Completed: c. 1812

Technical details
- Floor count: 2 (plus a basement)

The Bath House is a Category B listed building in Peterhead, Aberdeenshire, Scotland. Located at 7 Bath Street, it dates to around 1812.

Its description by architectural historian Charles McKean: a smart villa in smooth granite, has string-courses, quoins, a dentilled cornice, and a flight of steps up to a raised front door.

== See also ==
- List of listed buildings in Peterhead, Aberdeenshire
