= Fish-House, Peterhead =

Building in Scotland

Fish-House
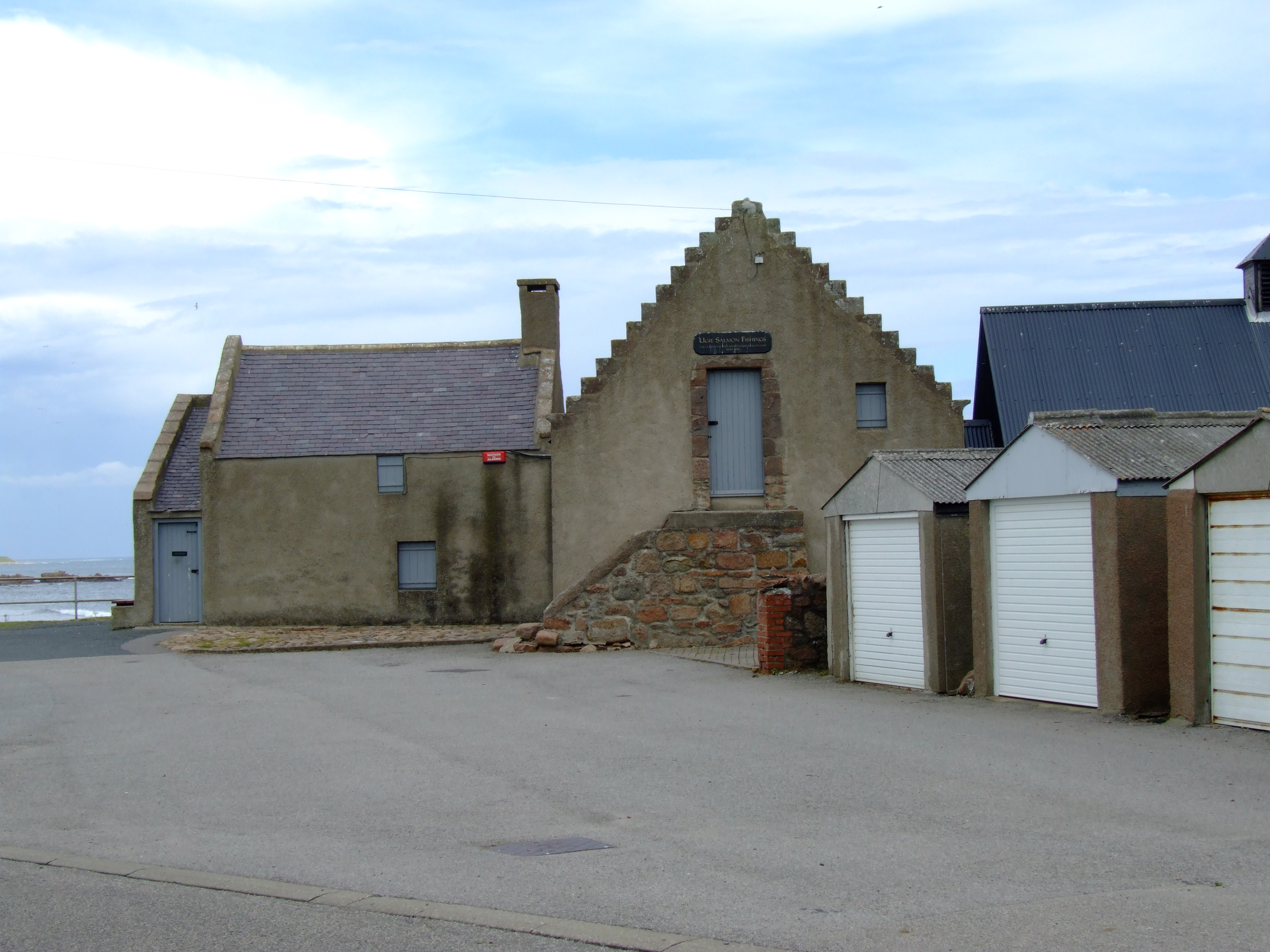
- The building in 2009, when it was the home of Ugie Salmon Fishings. The section with the elevated door is the original part
- Interactive map of the Fish-House area

General information
- Location: 1 Golf Road, Peterhead, Scotland
- Coordinates: 57.516004°N 1.797427°W
- Completed: 1585

Technical details
- Floor count: 1 (plus a loft)

The Fish-House (also known as the Salmon House) is a Category B listed building on Golf Road in the Buchanhaven area of Peterhead, Aberdeenshire, Scotland. One of the two right-angled blocks dates from 1585, making it the oldest building in Peterhead. Walker and Woodworth state the structure was built as a coastal store for Inverugie Castle by William Keith, 4th Earl Marischal, whose initials are on a skewputt. They also state that it was "rebuilt c. 1801," but without clarification as to which building.

The property is still in operation, as the home of the Ugie Salmon smokehouse. The addition, which is not attached to the original building, was added the following century.

The original section of the building has a crow-stepped gable with a forestair up to the loft.

The road on which it stands is so-named because it leads to Peterhead Golf Club, although that was established over 250 years after the fish house.

== See also ==
- List of listed buildings in Peterhead, Aberdeenshire
