= St. Peter's Episcopal Church, Peterhead =

St. Peter's Church
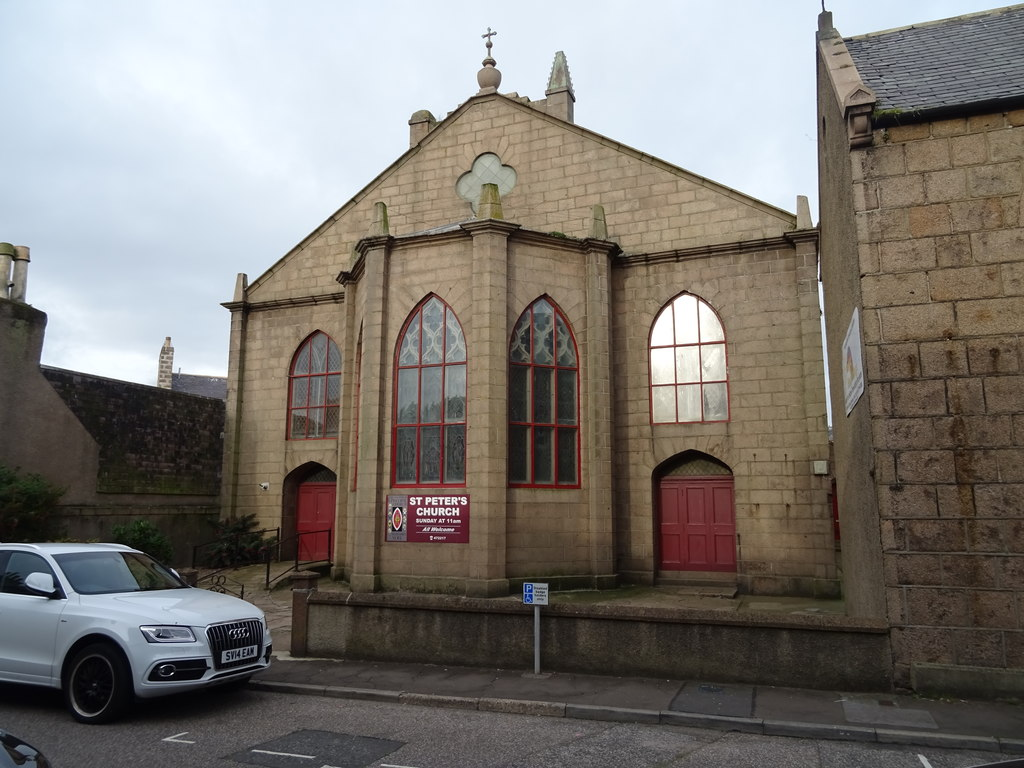
- The church in 2020

- Location within Aberdeenshire
- St. Peter's Church
- 57°30′13″N 1°46′40″W
- Location: 22 Merchant Street; Peterhead; Aberdeenshire; Scotland
- Denomination: Episcopalian
- Website: Official website

History
- Consecrated: 2 August 1857

Architecture
- Functional status: Active
- Architect: Robert Mitchell
- Completed: 1814

Administration
- Diocese: Diocese of Aberdeen and Orkney

Clergy
- Rector: Rev. Richard N. O'Sullivan

St. Peter's Church is a Category B listed building located on Merchant Street in Peterhead, Aberdeenshire, Scotland. It was founded in 1814 and incorporates a late-18th century house, which is believed to be the original rectory. Today's structure was built on the site of a 1798 church; it opened for worship on 24 December 1814; it was consecrated on 2 August 1857 by Bishop Suther. The church's architect was Robert Mitchell.

The church is part of the Diocese of Aberdeen and Orkney.

== History ==
The church is the seventh home for Peterhead's Episcopalian parish since their ejection from the parish kirk in 1699. The then-incumbent of the town was Alexander Barclay, who formed a meeting house in his own Port Henry Road house. During the ministry of Alexander Hepburn, his successor, a chapel was built near the head of the Broad Street in 1731. This chapel was destroyed on the orders of Lord Ancrum in May 1746. Services again reverted to being held in private residences thereafter.

Subsequent locations of the church:

- Chapel Street (from 1767)
- Geary's Close (on Broad Street)
- Merchant Street (original building) (from 1798)
- Merchant Street (today's building) (from 1814)

During the ministry of Gilbert Rorison (1845–1869), the church's apse was added, as well as the Torry Memorial Window. Its organ was built in 1867.

== See also ==
- List of listed buildings in Peterhead, Aberdeenshire

== Bibliography ==
- A Brief History and Guide (David M. Bertie)
- Church History of Buchan (John Wilkinson; 1914)
