= Buchan Ness Lighthouse =

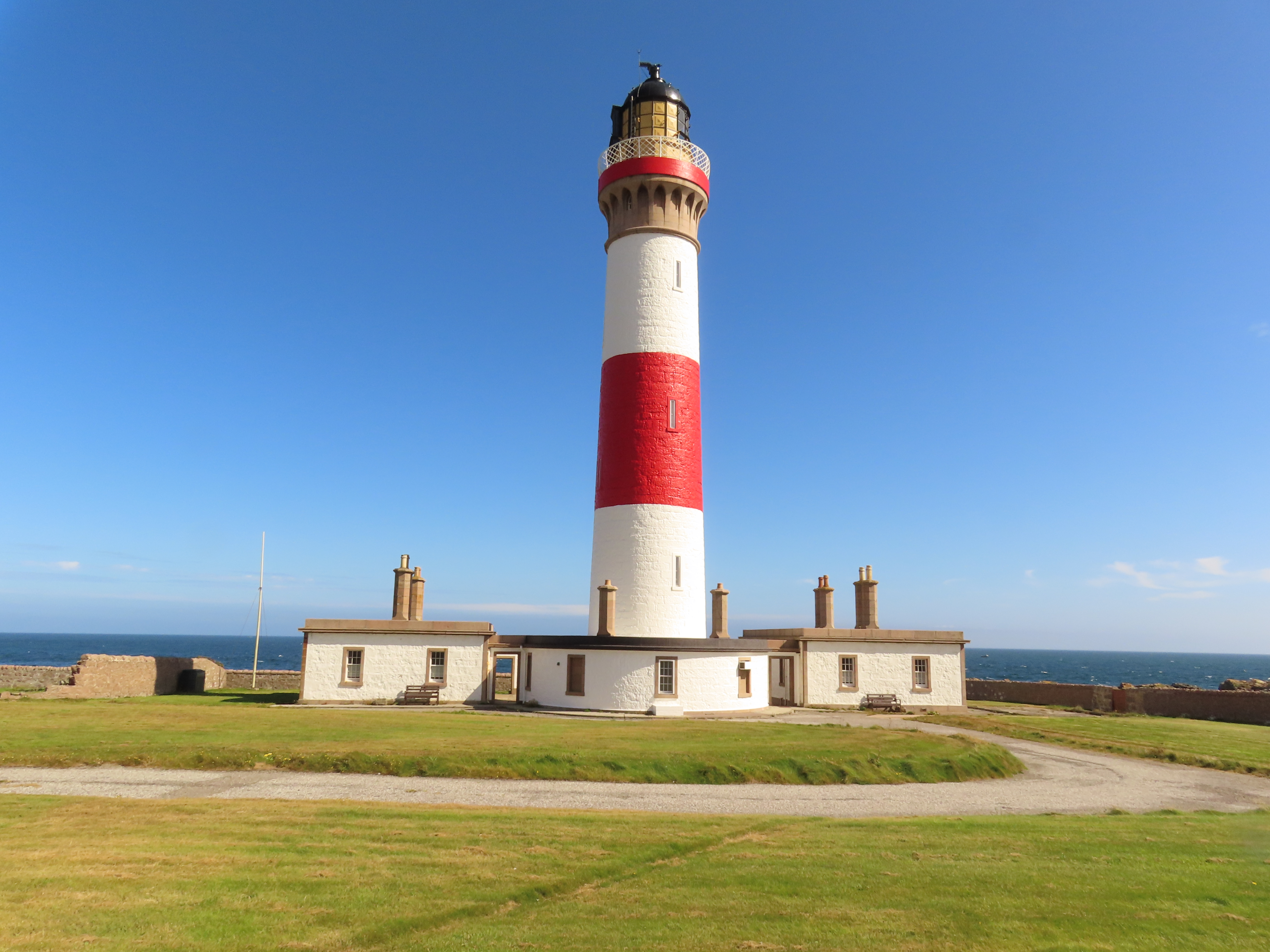
- Buchan Ness (also spelled Buchanness) Lighthouse
- Location: Boddam; Aberdeenshire; Scotland
- OS grid: NK1362442263
- Coordinates: 57.470449°N 1.774452°W

Tower
- Constructed: 1824
- Built by: Robert Stevenson
- Construction: granite tower
- Automated: 1988
- Height: 36 metres (118 ft)
- Shape: cylindrical tower with balcony and lantern
- Markings: white tower with a red band, red balcony, black lantern
- Power source: mains electricity
- Operator: Buchan Ness Lighthouse Holidays
- Heritage: HES: Cat.A – LB16367 – 16/04/1971
- Fog signal: Siren – Installed in 1904 with 3 blasts every 90 sec. Nicknamed: Boddam Coo. In 1989 replaced by an Electric emitter. Discontinued in 2000
- Racon: O(---) 14 M

Light
- Focal height: 40 metres (130 ft)
- Lens: hyperradiant Fresnel lens
- Light source: Electric Flashing Mains Powered Biform LED Optic
- Intensity: 2,000,000 cd
- Range: 18 nautical miles [33 km]
- Characteristic: Fl. W 5s 40 m 18M Buchan Ness [Fl. 0.3s, ec. 4.7s]

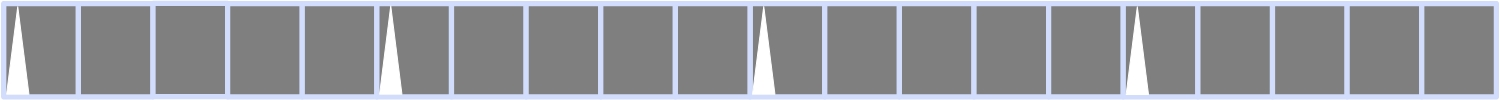

Buchan Ness lighthouse is a lighthouse in Boddam, Aberdeenshire. Scotland. The area around the headland of Buchan Ness was for many centuries the point from which trading and whaling voyages departed across open ocean, bound for Archangel, Greenland and Spitsbergen amongst other destinations.

Over time, many vessels had been run aground in poor weather, and in 1819, petitions were sent to the Northern Lighthouse Board to erect a lighthouse in the vicinity. As Engineer to the board, Robert Stevenson decided upon the present location; the granite-built construction being completed in 1824 and the light established in 1827.

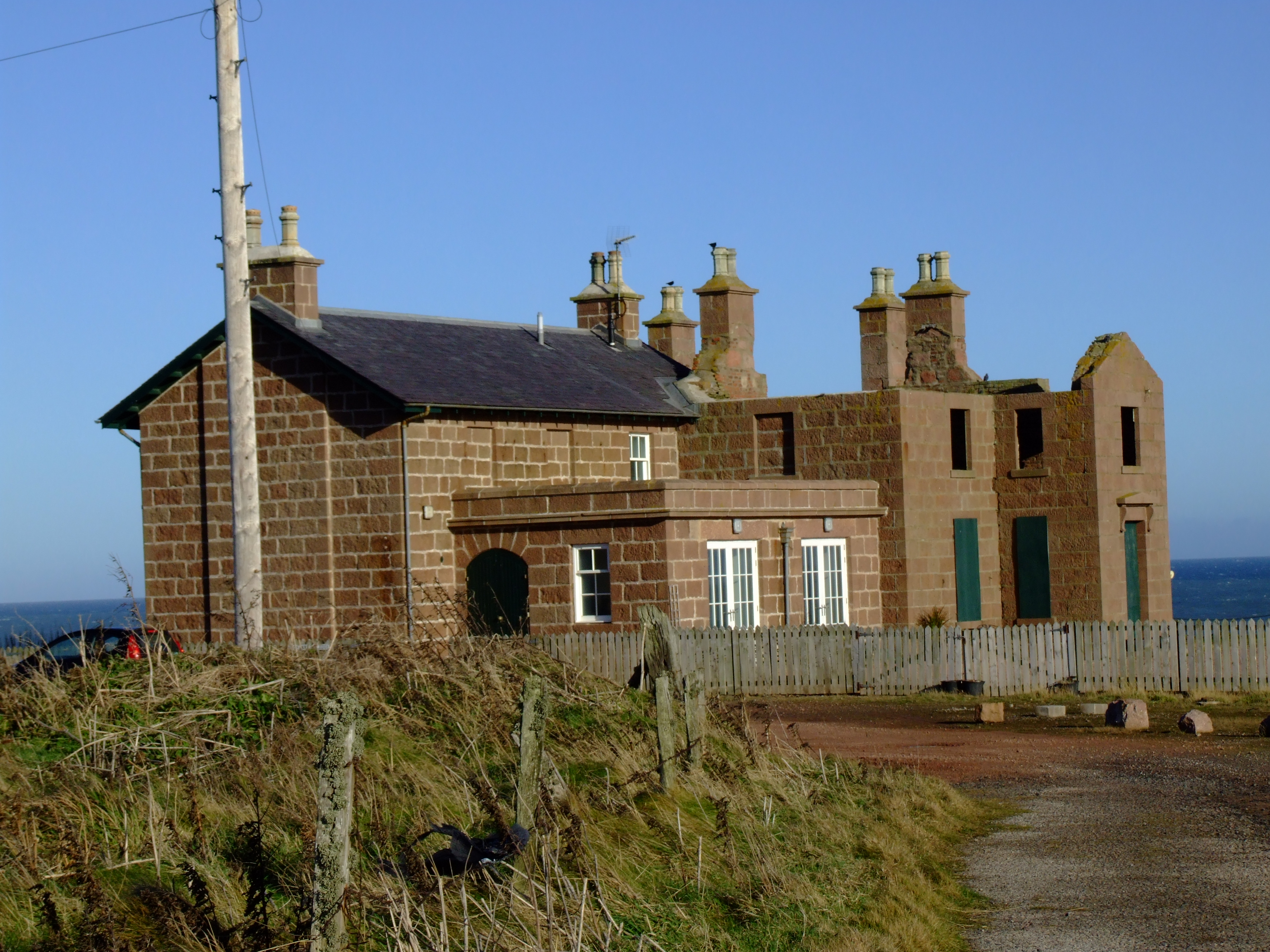
Buchanness Lodge Marine Villa, 2010

The red band was painted in 1907 to help passing ships determine their location, and for many years, a foghorn (locally known as the Boddam Coo or also as the Boddam Bear, prior to reequipping in 1978) was installed, this being officially turned off in 2000.

The lighthouse is 118 ft (36 m) high, flashing a white light every five seconds, which with the current lamp is visible for 28 nautical miles (52 km).

The ruins are visible on the promontory of Buchanness Lodge, an Italianate marine villa built in 1840 by John Smith for Lord Aberdeen. Below the consoled pediment of the main door is inscribed procul negotiis beautus, which, roughly translated, means "lucky is the man who stays away from business".
