= New Aberdour =

Village in Aberdeenshire, Scotland

Coordinates: 57.6591°N 2.1949°W

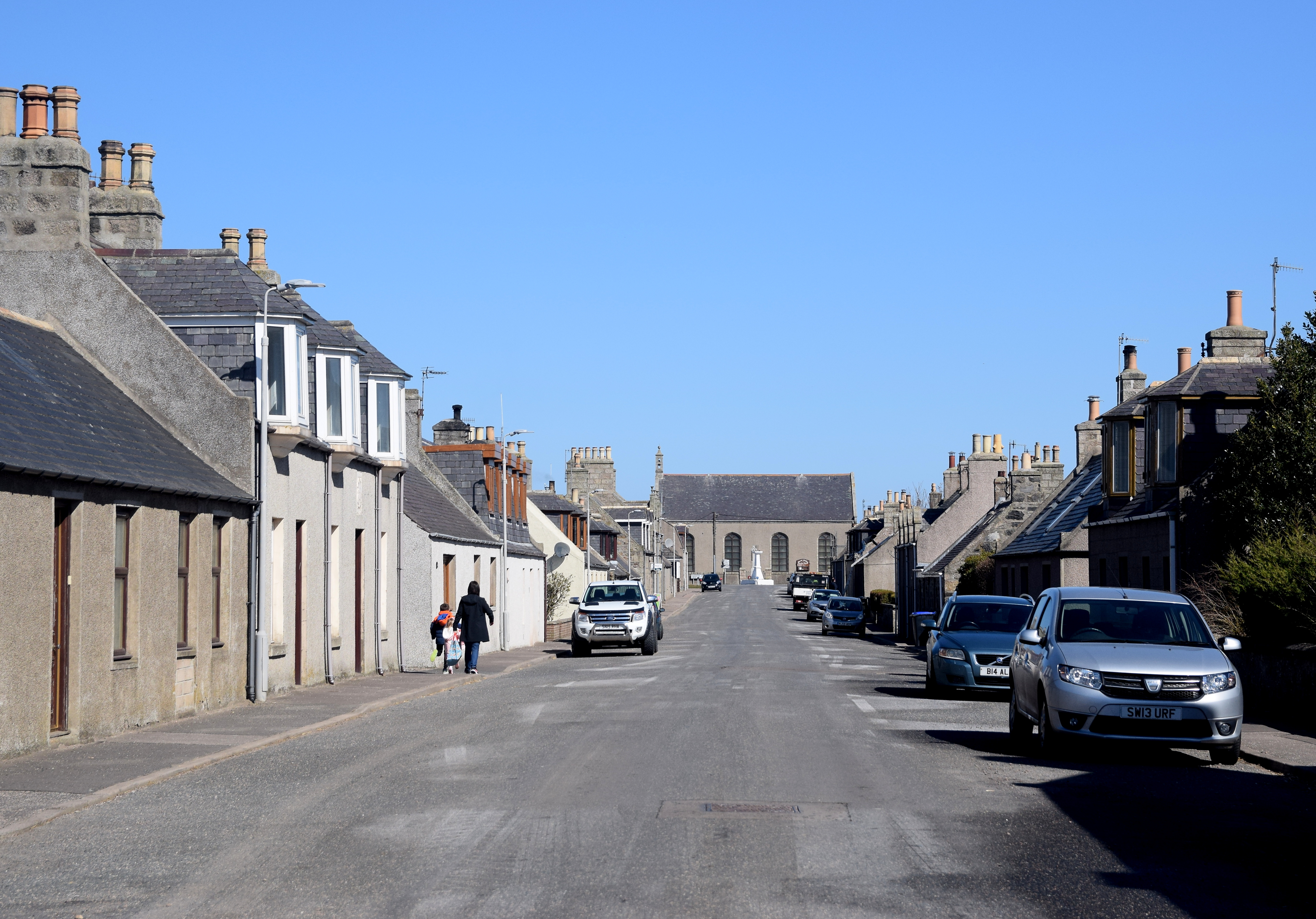
The High Street, looking north towards the parish church

New Aberdour is a small planned village in the Aberdour parish of Aberdeenshire, Scotland, situated south of Aberdour Bay on the Moray Firth. It lies 7 miles (11 km) west of Fraserburgh. One of the earliest churches in Scotland is said to have been founded here in AD 580 by Saint Drostan and Saint Columba.

In October 1797, William Gordon of Aberdour chose this high, exposed plateau for his "village upon an estate near the Kirk of Aberdour". He then invited "industrious tradesmen and labourers" to live there.

The Commercial Hotel is believed to have been built in 1798. As of 2021, it is on Scotland's Buildings at Risk Register.

The harled parish church dates to 1818, designed by John Smith. It reuses the 1771 bellcote from the church of St Drostan in Aberdour.

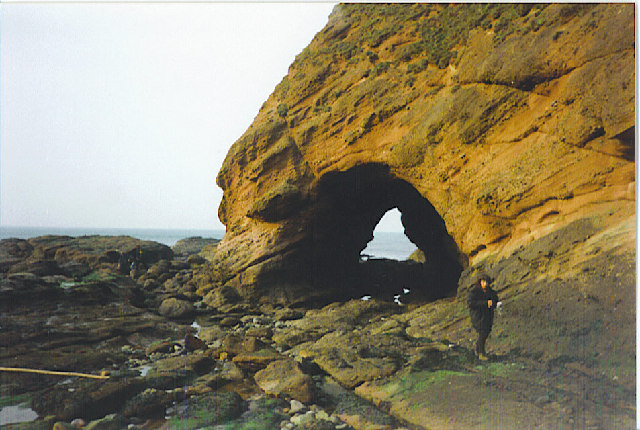
A natural arch in Aberdour Bay

During World War II, a German Heinkel He 115 returning from a coastal reconnaissance mission crashed near Windyheads Hill in poor weather, and local people assisted an injured airman.

== See also ==
- Aberdour House
