= Old St Peter's Church, Peterhead =

Old St Peter's Church
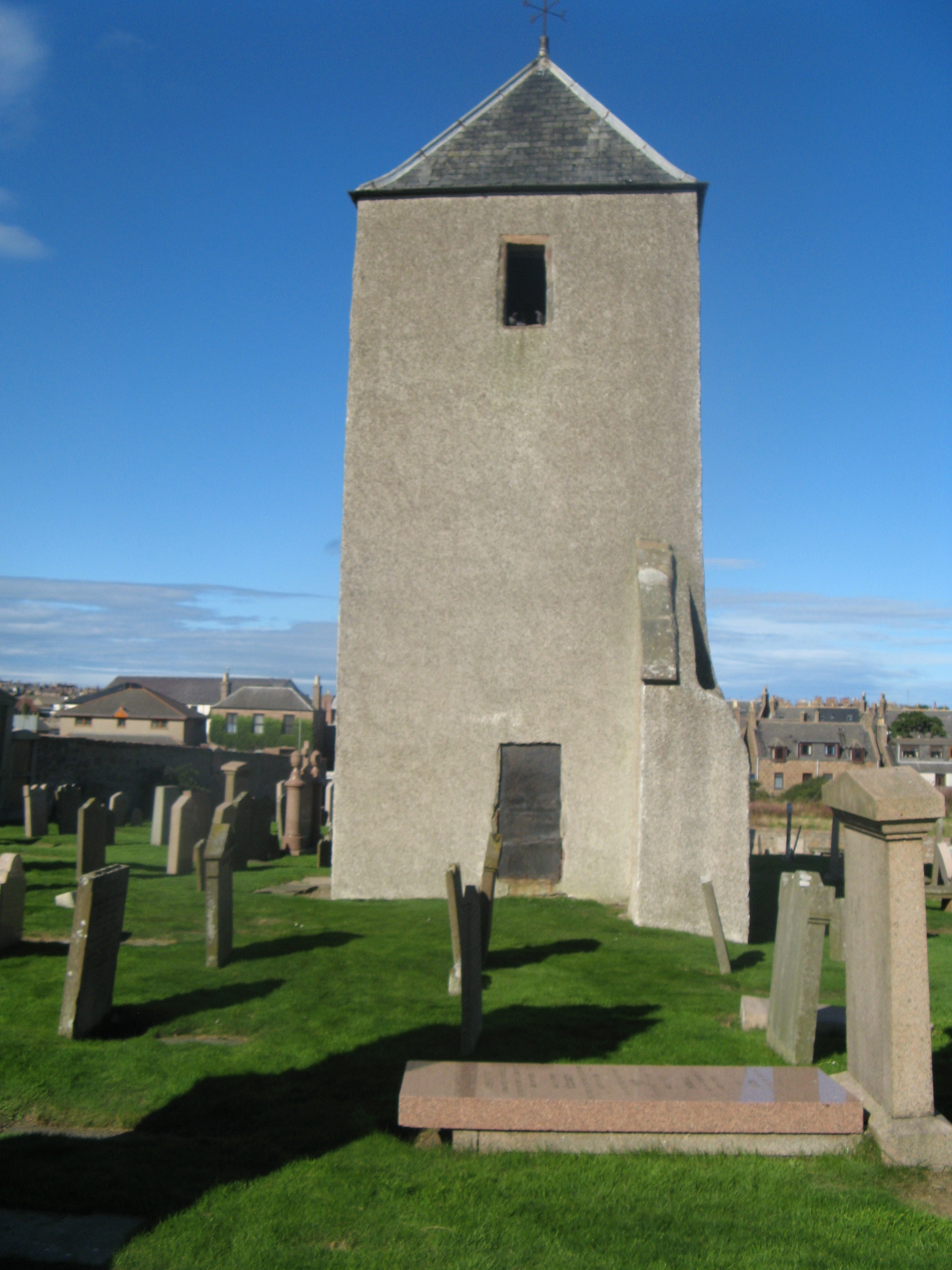
- The church in 2013, looking northeast

- Location within Aberdeenshire
- Old St Peter's Church
- 57°30′16″N 1°47′26″W

Scheduled monument
- Official name: St Peter's Church
- Type: Ecclesiastical: church
- Designated: 19 March 1993
- Reference no.: SM5661

Old St Peter's Church (also known as St Peter's on the Links) is a scheduled monument in Peterhead, Aberdeenshire, Scotland. While the medieval main tower is still standing, only ruins remain of its other sections, some of which date to the 12th century. The pyramid roof of the tower is believed to be 18th century.

== History ==
Formerly Peterhead Parish Church of Peterugie, held by the Bishop of Dunkeld, it transferred to Deer Abbey in 1218. In 1543, William Keith, 3rd Earl Marischal, became commendator. It was resigned to the Crown in 1587, but the land was kept and a burgh of barony was formed in 1593. Earl Marischal's estates were confiscated in 1716, and the church was sold to York Buildings Company in 1720. It went bankrupt in 1786, and it was sold to the Trustees of Merchant Maiden Hospital and Mary Erskine in 1728. They appointed a provost (Baron Bailie, Thomas Arbuthnot of Meethill) and three bailies.

The church was abandoned in 1771, when a new one was built near the site of the present drill hall.

The church was originally given Category A listed status in 1971, but it was elevated to being a scheduled monument in 2016.

== Graveyard ==
The church's graveyard holds Category B listed status. It contains monuments mainly from the 17th, 18th and early 19th centuries. A southern extension is comparatively modern.

== Gallery ==
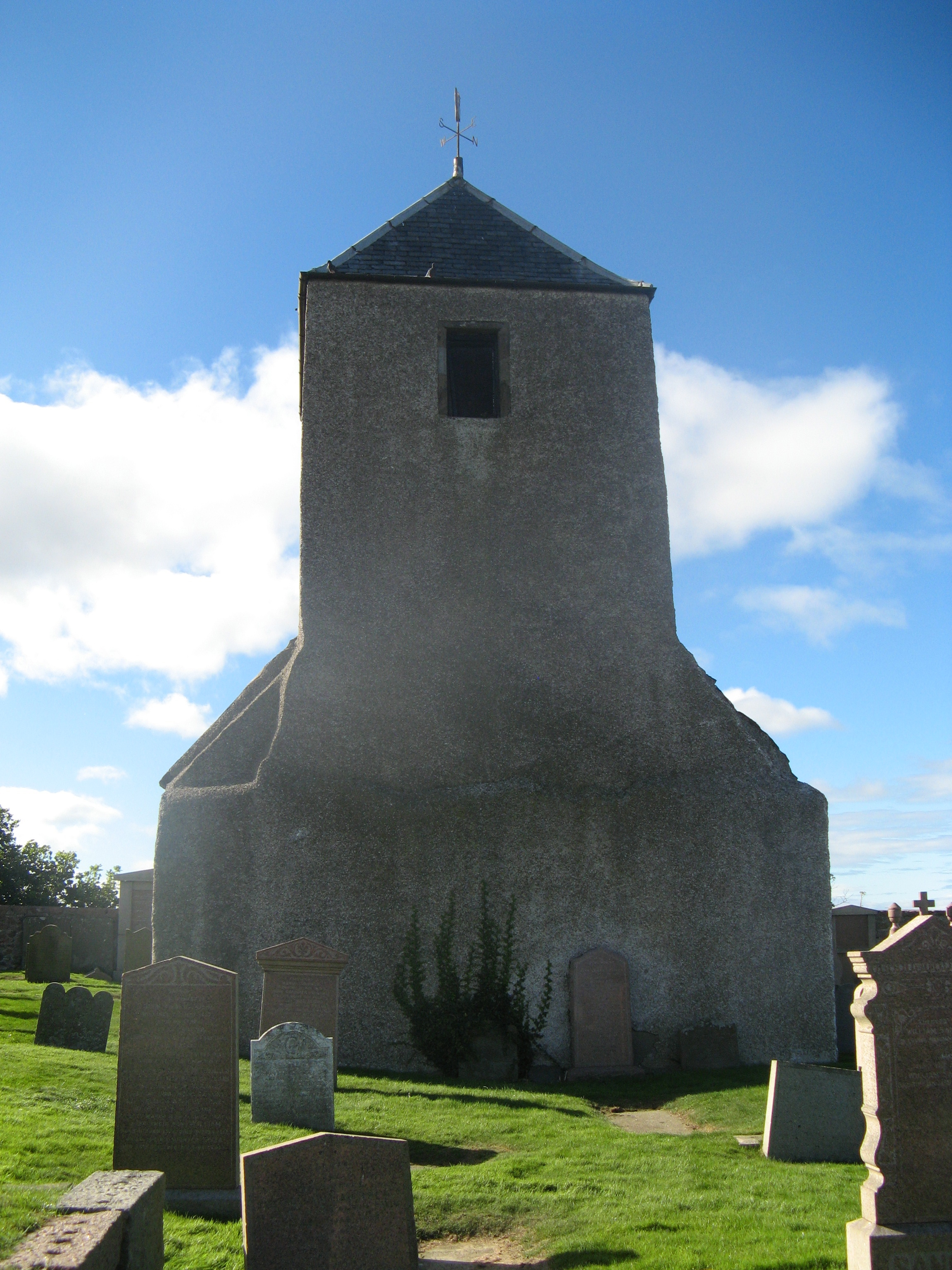
The eastern side of the tower

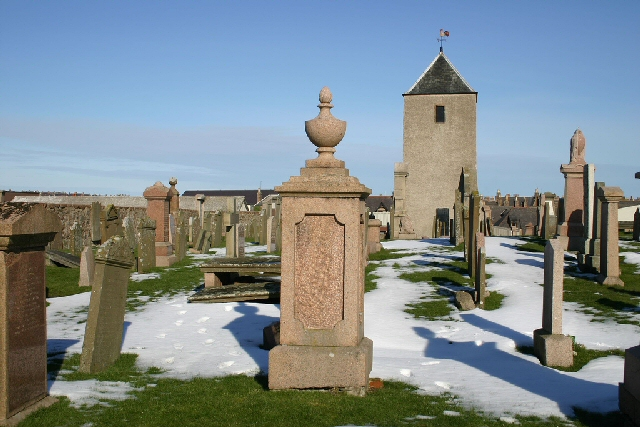
The churchyard

== See also ==
- Scheduled monuments in Aberdeenshire
