= House of Memsie =

Category A listed house in Memsie, Aberdeenshire

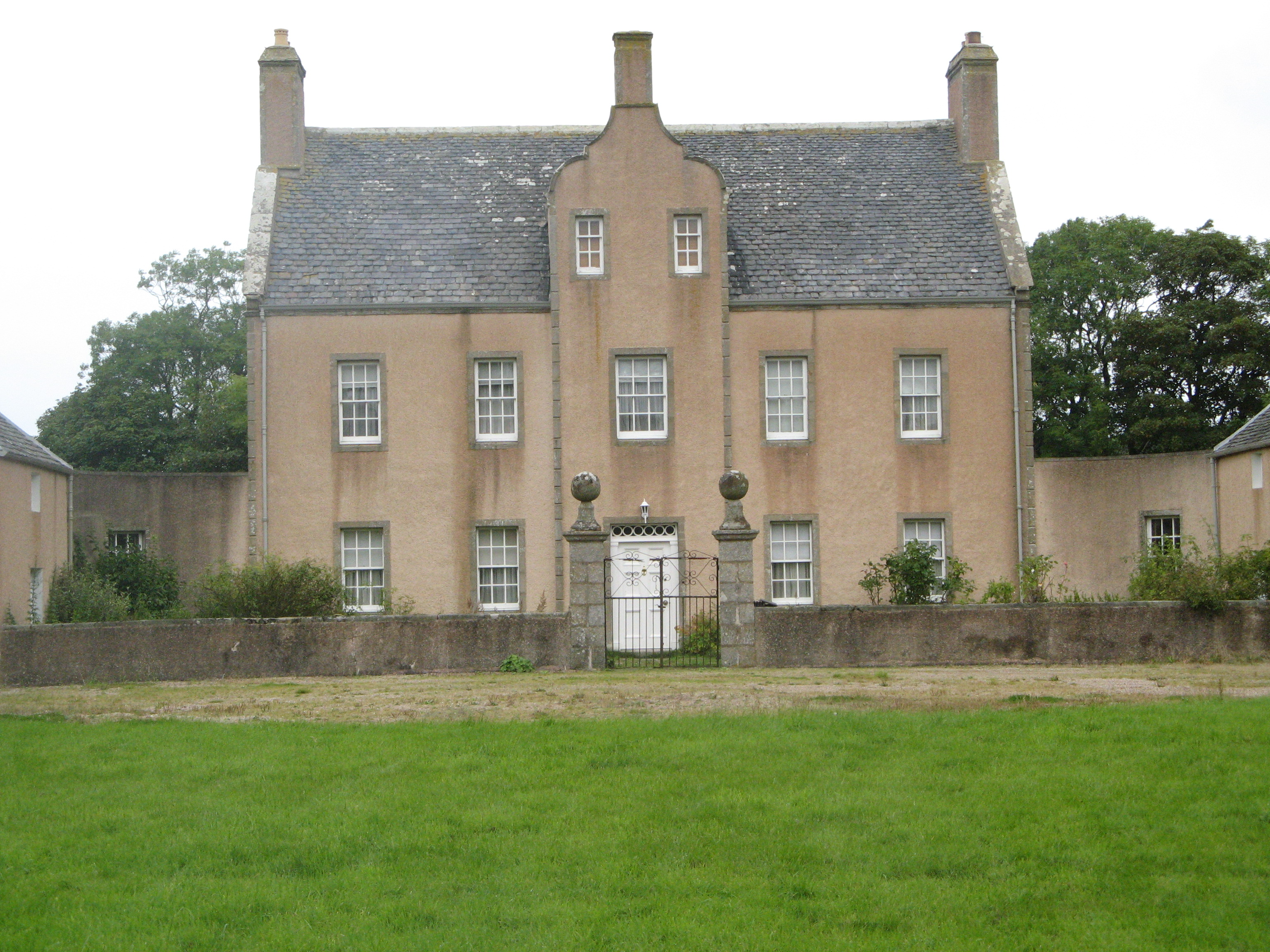
- The south-facing main façade in 2013
- Interactive map of the House of Memsie area
- Alternative names: Memsie House

General information
- Location: Memsie, Aberdeenshire, Scotland
- Coordinates: 57.6411°N 2.04682°W
- Completed: c. 1760

Technical details
- Floor count: 3
- Floor area: 3,702 sq ft

House of Memsie (also known as Mesmie House) is a Category A listed country house and estate in Memsie, Aberdeenshire, Scotland. It dates to around 1760, and it received its historic designation in 1971. It was formerly the home of the Fraser family for over three hundred years. It was sold to Lord Saltoun in the early 19th century. A Captain Dalrymple was another previous owner. Historian Charles McKean describes it as a "smaller and more decorative version of Aberdour House".

== Gallery ==
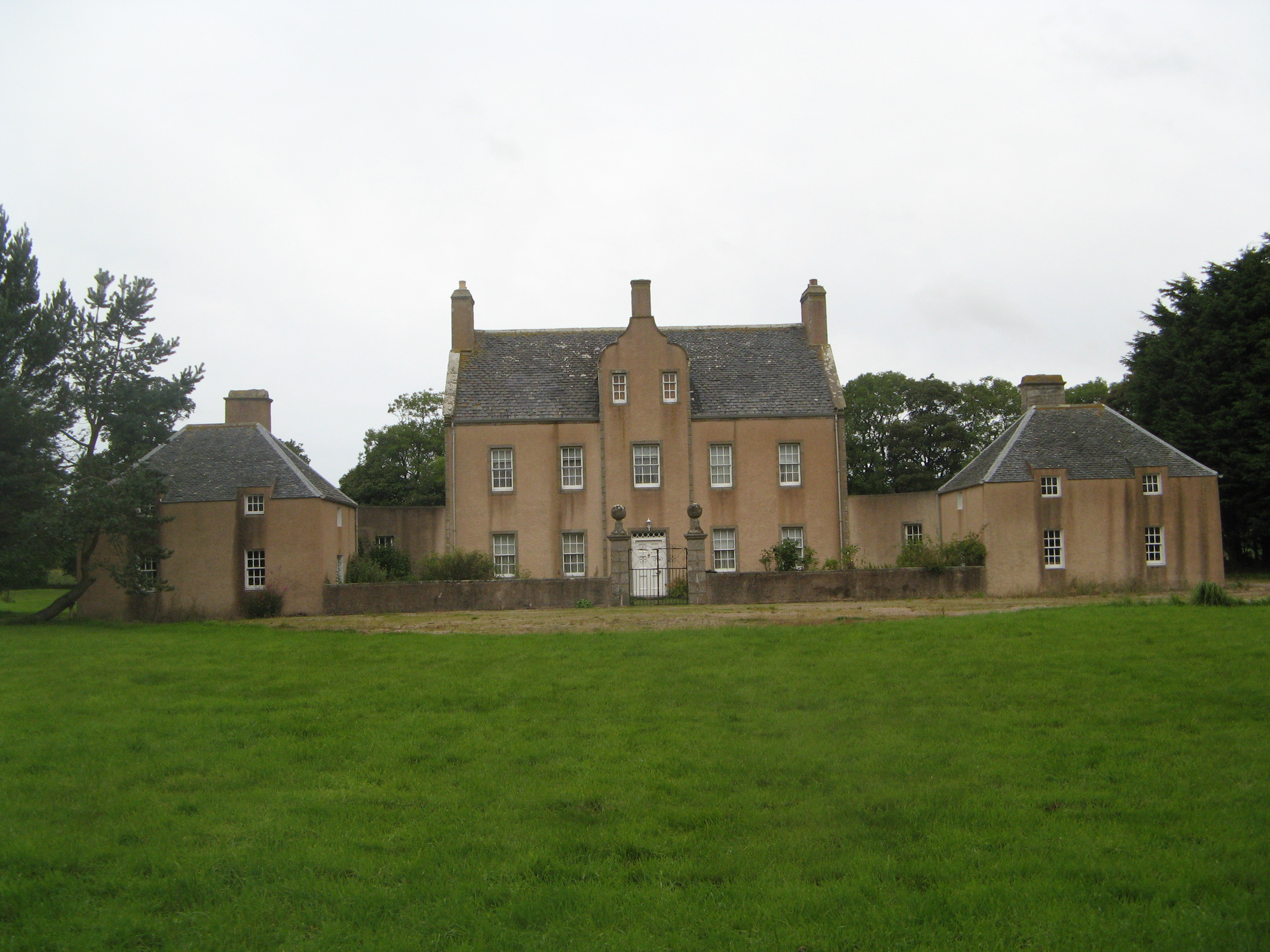
Front elevation showing the two pavilions in the forecourt. The one on the left (west) was for laundry; the one on the right (east) was a stable and coach house block

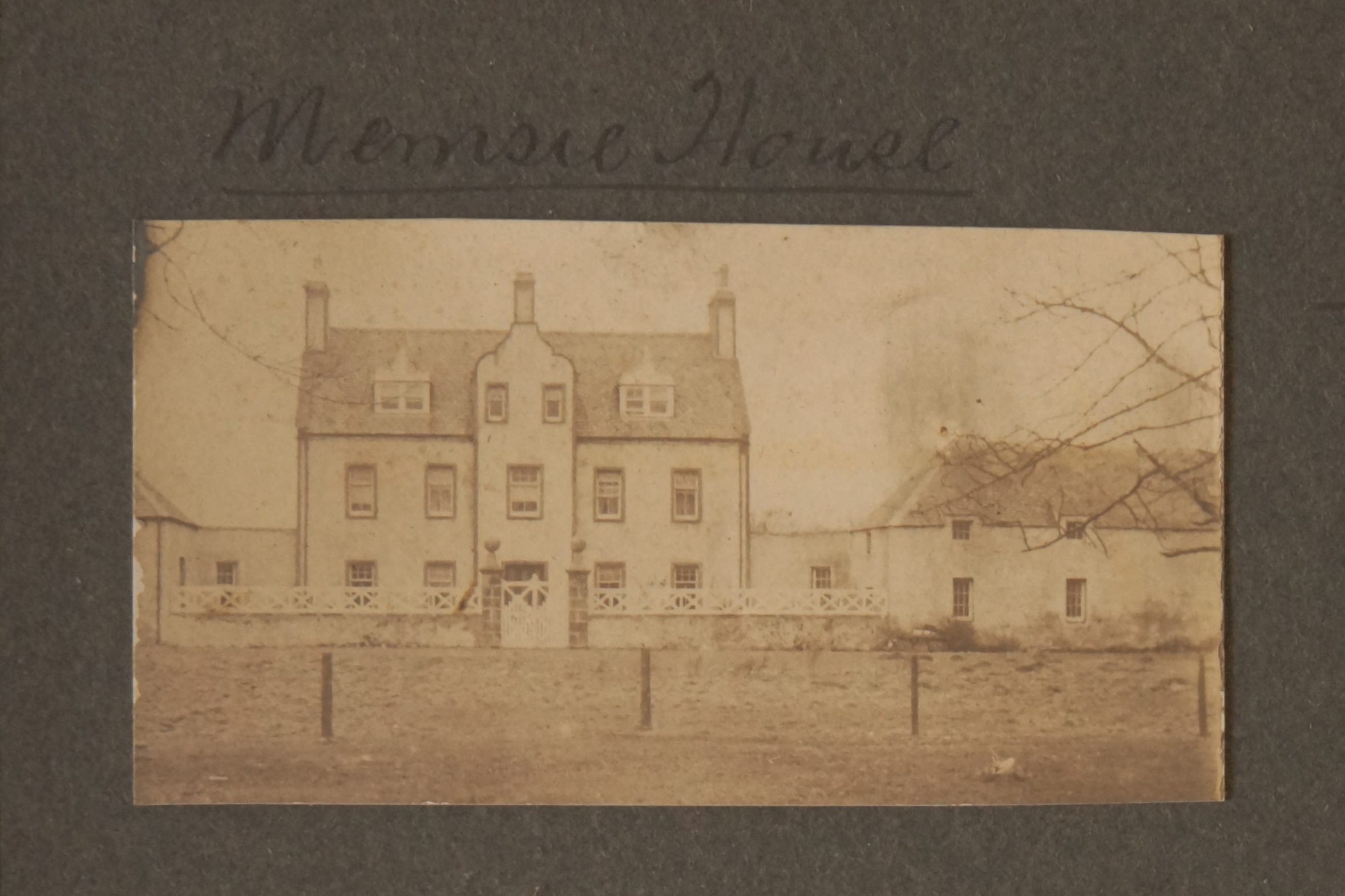
A 1913 photograph of the house

== See also ==
- List of listed buildings in Aberdeenshire
