= Peterhead Harbour =

Harbour in Peterhead, Scotland

Coordinates: 57.505944°N 1.773181°W

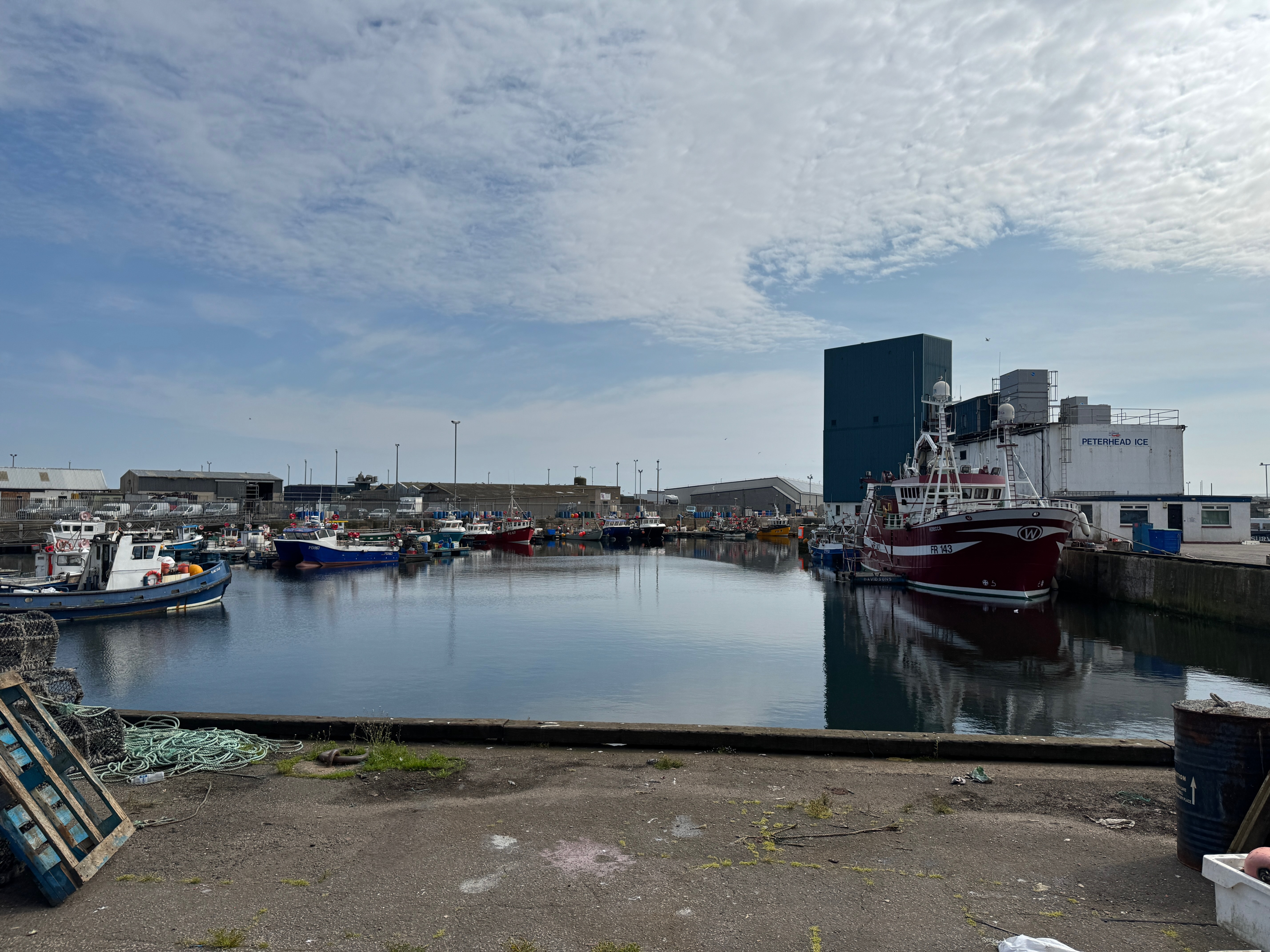
- Peterhead's North Harbour (2024)
- Interactive map of Peterhead Harbour

Location
- Country: United Kingdom
- Location: Peterhead, Aberdeenshire, Scotland

Details
- Harbourmaster: Ewan Rattray

Statistics
- Website https://www.peterheadport.co.uk/

Peterhead Harbour is a harbour in Peterhead, Aberdeenshire, Scotland. Situated immediately northeast of Peterhead Bay, it is composed of three harbours: Port Henry, North Harbour and South Harbour. The harbour is a Category B listed structure.

Queenie Bridge connects Bridge Street and Greenhill Road between North Harbour and South Harbour.

The harbour is owned and maintained by Peterhead Port Authority, which was formed in 2006 via a merger of Peterhead Bay Authority and Peterhead Harbour Trustees.

== History ==
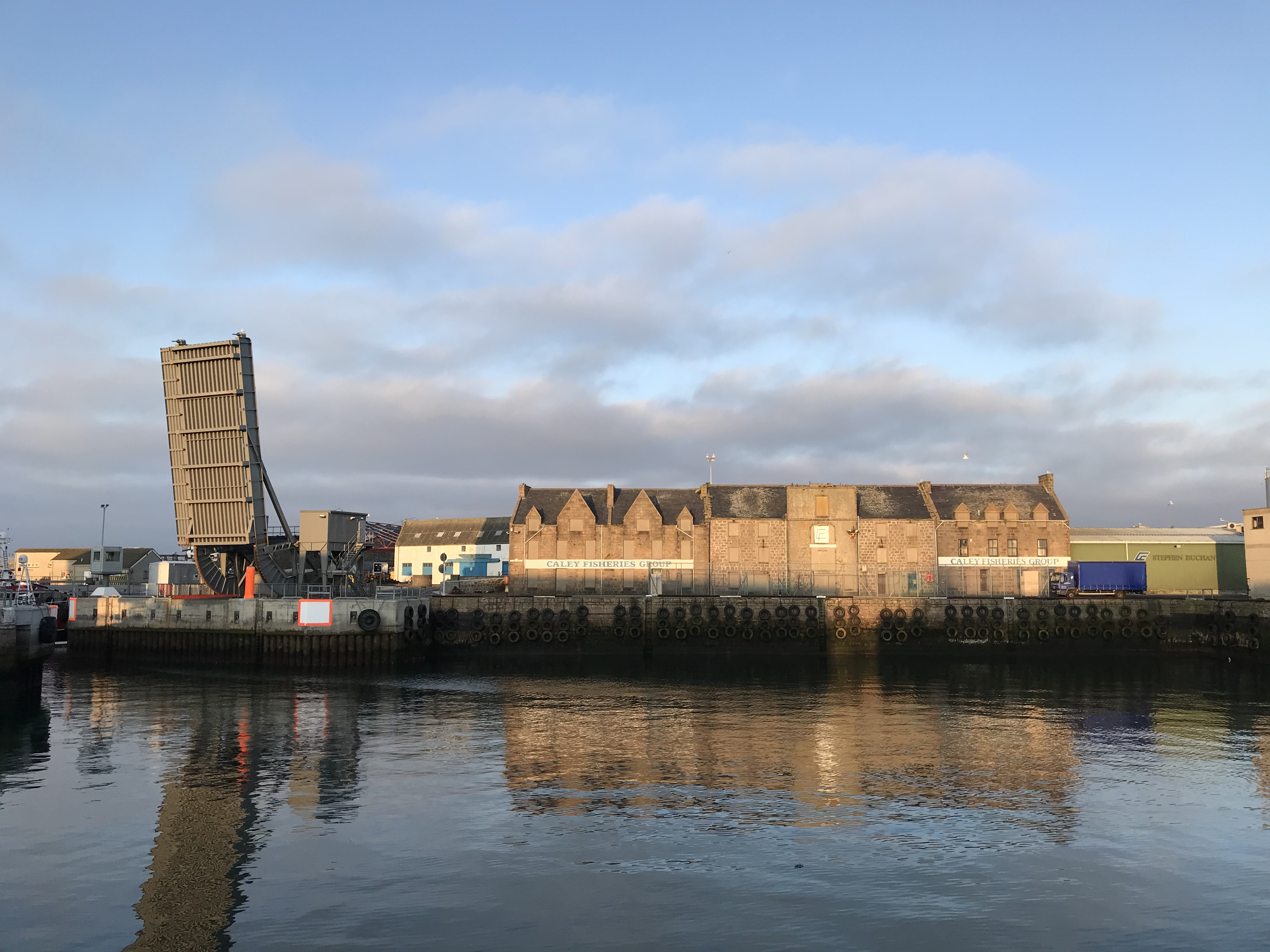
Looking east across South Harbour to Ship Row on what used to be Greenhill Island. Queenie Bridge is on the left

The harbour was formed by the filling in of the water around the former islands of Keith Inch and Greenhill. When Peterhead was founded, in 1593, it was known as the "Harbour and Barony of Keith Insche commonly called Peterhead".

The harbour was proving so valuable that in 1738, the Leith shipmasters attested that "the harbour of Peterhead is in our opinion the best situate of any place in Scotland for all ships trading on the north seas".

In 1815, before the increase in herring popularity, there were 72 vessels registered to Peterhead operating from the port; by 1850 there were over 400.

North Harbour and the dry dock were built by John Rennie and Thomas Telford between 1818 and 1822. They were improved fifteen years later. The junction canal was built in 1849, while the south and west piers of North Harbour were built by David Stevenson in 1855. The southern part of North Harbour (Middle Harbour) dates from 1872. It was constructed by David and his brother, Thomas, with improvements made between 1893 and 1897 by William Shield, a local worker.

Peterhead Harbours Act 1894
- Act of Parliament
- Parliament of the United Kingdom
- Long title: An Act to amend the Peterhead Harbours Act 1873 the Peterhead Harbours Amendment Act 1876 and the Peterhead Harbours Order 1881 to confer further powers upon the Trustees of the Harbours of Peterhead and for other purposes. (Repealed by
- Citation: 57 & 58 Vict. c. clxx

Dates
- Royal assent: 17 August 1894

Other legislation
- Amends: Peterhead Harbours Act 1873; Peterhead Harbours Amendment Act 1876; Pier and Harbour Orders Confirmation Act 1881
- Repealed by: Peterhead Harbours Order Confirmation Act 1992

Status: Repealed

Text of statute as originally enacted

The Peterhead Harbours Act 1894 (57 & 58 Vict. c. clxx) was passed, the various objects of which included the building of a fish market and to acquire a short line of railway. (Today, Peterhead Fish Market is located in North Harbor on Alexandra Parade.)

South Harbour was deepened between 1906 and 1908. The Harbour of Refuge (Admiralty Backwaters) was begun in 1886 by Sir John Coode. It was built by convict labour.

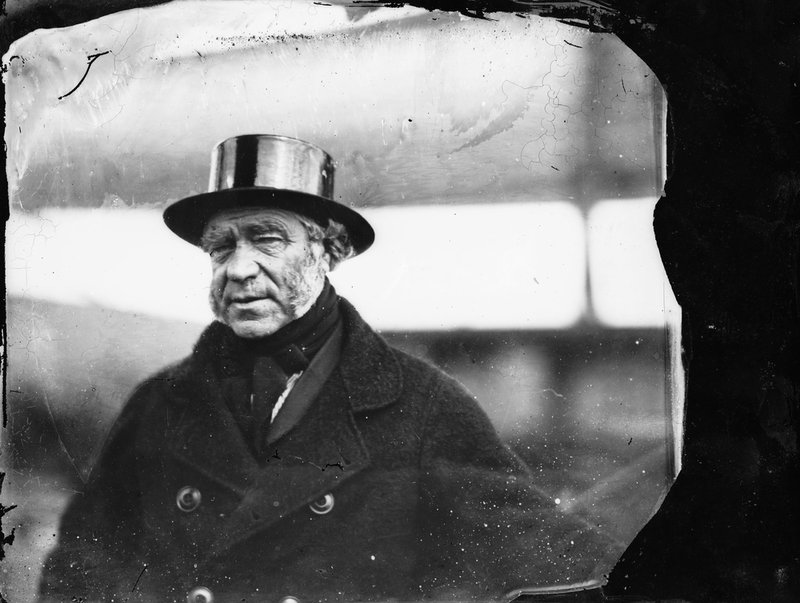
Donald Manson (c. 1792–1880), Peterhead's harbourmaster for around forty years

The present harbour, now a Category B listed structure, has two massive breakwaters, enclosing an area of approximately 300 acres (120 ha) in Peterhead Bay. The south breakwater, about 2,700 ft (820 m) long, was constructed in 1892–1912 using convict labour from the prison. Peterhead was, and remains, an important fishing port, and the breakwater gave it an advantage over other fishing ports. The north breakwater, constructed 1912–1956, is approximately 1,500 ft (460 m) long.

Donald Manson was Peterhead's harbourmaster in the 19th century. He died in the role in 1880. As of 2024, the harbourmaster is Ewan Rattray.

=== Lighthouses ===
The South Breakwater lighthouse, built in 1833 bt Robert Stevenson, is active, and it is the easternmost lighthouse on mainland Scotland. It is owned by Peterhead Port Authority.

The Harbour South lighthouse was built in 1849 by Thomas Stevenson. Now inactive, it originally stood on the Albert Quay, but it was relocated in 2015 to the junction of the Esplanade and Alexandra Parade.

The Harbour North lighthouse was built in 1908. Now inactive, it is located in front of the Port Authority's control building on West Pier.

== See also ==
- List of ports and harbours in Scotland
