= Queenie Bridge =

20th century bridge in Aberdeenshire, Scotland

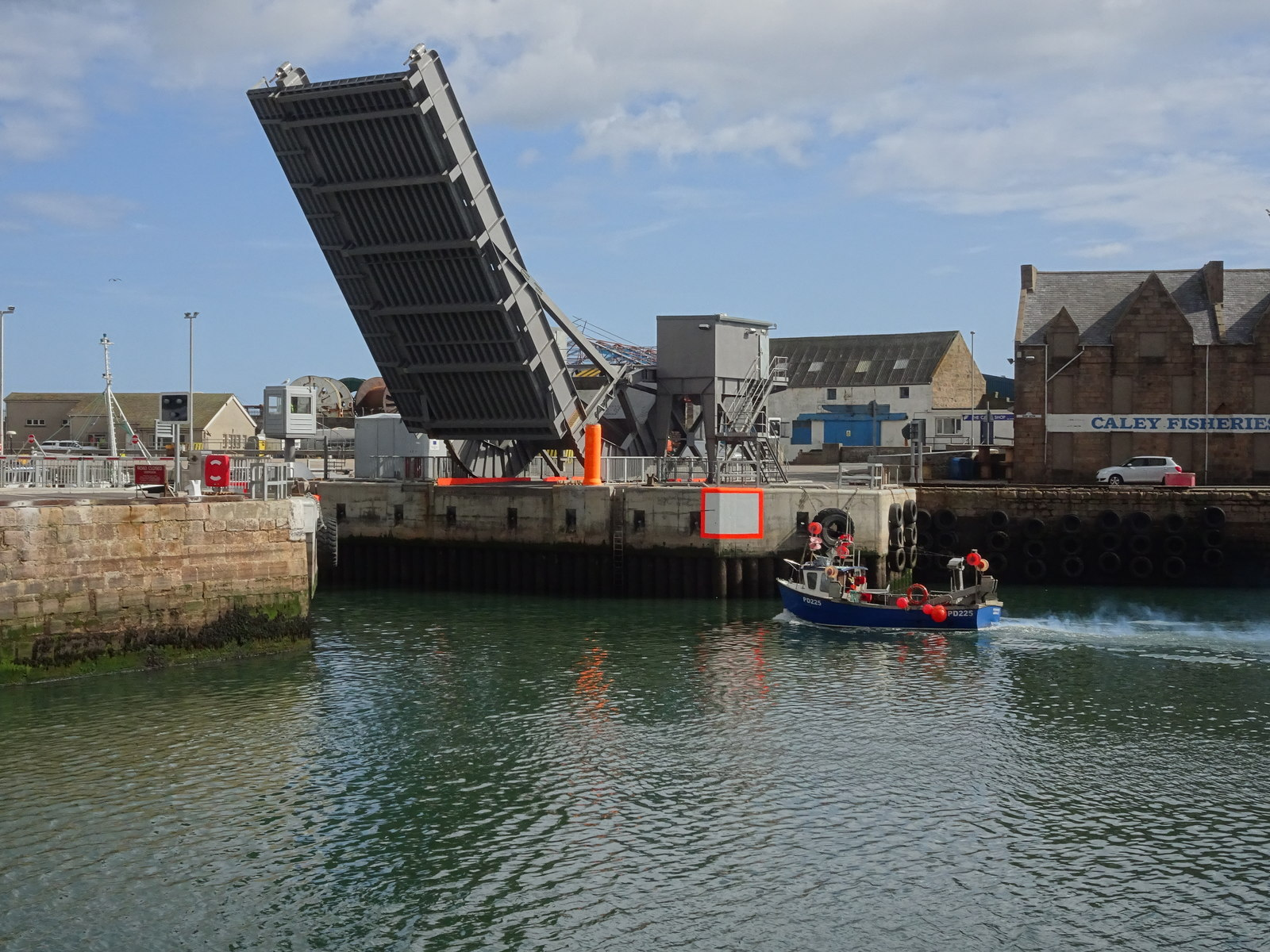
- The bridge in 2019, looking east to Ship Row in Greenhill
- Coordinates: 57.50411°N 1.77227°W
- Carries: Bridge Street and Greenhill Road
- Crosses: Middle Harbour
- Locale: Aberdeenshire

Characteristics
- Design: Bascule
- Longest span: 106 feet (32 m)

History
- Opened: 1954 (72 years ago)

Location
- Interactive map of Queenie Bridge

Queenie Bridge is a toll-free bascule bridge in Peterhead, Aberdeenshire, Scotland. Opened in 1954, it connects Bridge Street and Greenhill Road in the town's harbour area. It replaced a swing bridge which had stood on the site since 1850 and was built at a cost of £8,000. There has been a crossing at this point in the harbour since at least 1739.

The bridge's name is a play on Quinzie (the Scots version of the French word coin, which signifies a corner), the historic name of the area of town to the south of Port Henry, which was constructed in 1593. Quinzie was a causeway of boulders, covered only by spring tides, which linked the islands of Keith Inch and Greenhill to the mainland.

== See also ==
- List of bridges in Scotland
