= Port Henry (Peterhead) =

Coordinates: 57.5079°N 1.7739°W

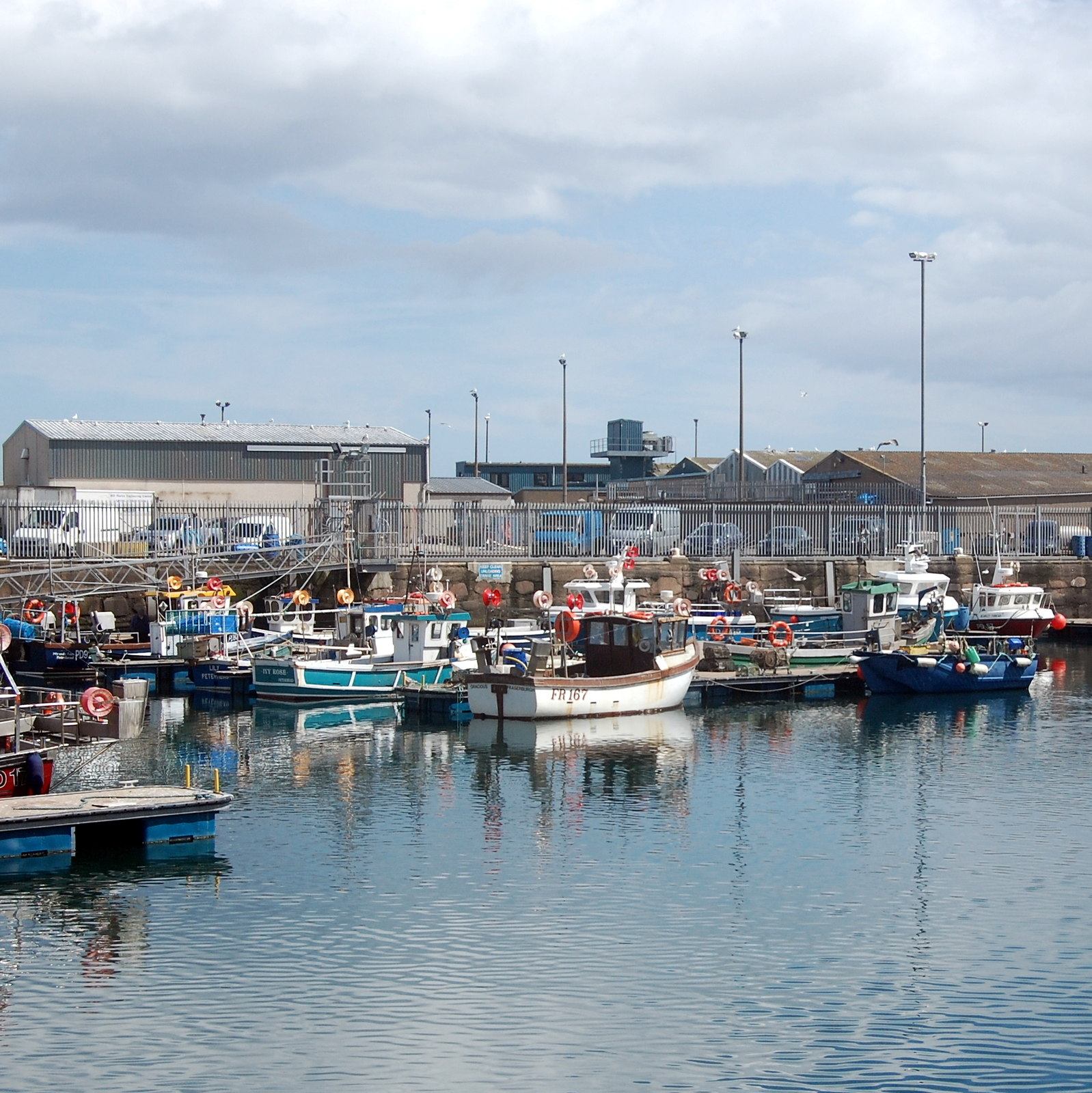
- Port Henry in 2015, looking northeast from Seagate

- Location within Scotland
- Country: Scotland
- Sovereign state: United Kingdom
- Post town: PETERHEAD
- Postcode district: AB42
- Dialling code: 01779
- Police: Scotland
- Fire: Scottish
- Ambulance: Scottish

Port Henry is an area of Peterhead, Aberdeenshire, Scotland. Established in 1593, north of Peterhead Bay, it is the oldest commercial area of the town (the adjacent Roanheads being residential). It was established after Peterhead's fishermen settled there due to its position on the northeastern shoulder of the town's peninsula, 0.25 miles (0.40 km) northeast of today's town centre.

Keith Inch Castle stood around 0.35 miles (0.56 km) south of Port Henry at the time of its establishment, on Keith Inch, an island and the easternmost point of mainland Scotland. Along with the adjacent Greenhill, Keith Inch is no longer an island.

== History ==
The town's twelve original feuars occupied land along Seagate between the pier of Port Henry, to the north, and the Quinzie (Queenie) to the south.

The construction of Port Henry in 1593 encouraged the growth of Peterhead as a fishing port and established a base for trade. (Port Henry Road, running east–west, is just north of the harbour, off East North Street.) Port Henry, the oldest of Peterhead's three harbours, was constructed along the Seagate shore by Henry Middleton, under the supervision of George Keith, 5th Earl Marischal. It was protected to the north by the Old Pier, which was probably erected before 1593.

Port Henry was improved in 1631 and repaired before the end of the century and again early in the 18th century. The south pier was increased in height and the west pier was constructed. The southern part was reconstructed between 1775 and 1781 by John Smeaton, with improvements carried out by John Rennie between 1806 and 1810. He also oversaw an addition to the west pier in 1813.
