= George Morrell =

George Morrell may refer to:

- George Morrell (football manager) (c. 1872–?), Scottish football manager of Arsenal FC
- George Herbert Morrell (1845–1906), English politician and lawyer
- George Truman Morrell (1830–1912), British naval officer and explorer
- George Morrell (racing driver) in 1975 Hardie Ferodo 1000
- George Morrell (actor) in His Brother's Ghost

== See also ==
- George Morell (disambiguation)
