= Volta Tower =

Coordinates: 52°20′N 0°39′W

Volta Tower was a folly in the town of Finedon, Northamptonshire, England. It was built in 1865 and collapsed in 1951.

== History ==
The Volta Tower was built in 1865 by William Harcourt Isham Mackworth-Dolben of Finedon Hall. William Mackworth (1806—72), a younger son of Sir Digby Mackworth, the 3rd Baronet, had taken the additional surname Dolben after he married Frances, the heiress of Sir John English Dolben, the 4th Baronet.

Mackworth-Dolben built the tower to commemorate the death of his eldest son, Lieutenant Commander William Digby Dolben, who had drowned off the west coast of Africa on 1 September 1863, aged 24. William, serving on HMS Investigator, drowned crossing the bar of Lagos when the gig, a four-oar whaler was swamped. His younger brother, the poet Digby Mackworth Dolben, drowned aged nineteen in 1867.

The tower was circular and about 100 feet (30 m) high. A gabled extension of one of the two floors had been added in keeping. The tower stood off Station Road in Finedon with a long driveway in front. Finedon's cemetery was built alongside in 1892.

=== Collapse ===
Volta Tower collapsed on 16 November 1951 after standing for 86 years. At the time, John Edgar Northen and his wife Florence lived there. Mrs Northen (65) was inside and killed by the tower's collapse; Mr Northen was outside and survived.

The driveway to where Volta Tower stood still exists and a farm has been built on top of the tower's location as well as a bungalow. Nothing of the tower exists today apart from one carved stone figure of a cherub from close to the top of the tower which was auctioned in 2005 and bought by a Finedon resident. The tower is commemorated in Finedon's town sign.

== Sources ==
- John Bailey, Finedon Revealed, 1987, ISBN 0-9504250-1-X
- John Bailey, Look at Finedon, 2005, ISBN 0-9504250-2-8
