= Finedon Hall =

Country house in Finedon, Northamptonshire, England

Coordinates: 52°20′16″N 0°39′50″W

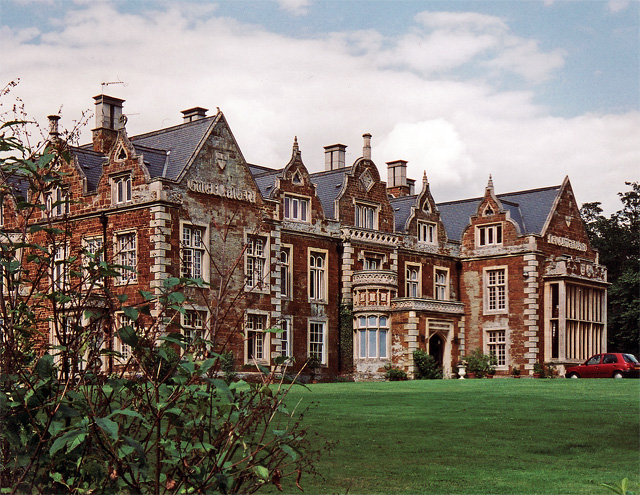
Finedon Hall

Finedon Hall is a Victorian country house in Finedon, Northamptonshire. It is a Grade II listed building.

== History ==
The core of the house is 17th or 18th century, and was extensively remodelled by William Harcourt Isham Mackworth Dolben (1806–1872). Datestones indicate a range of different building phases: 1855, 1851, 1856 and 1859. The architect is unknown, but is likely to have been E. F. Law of Northampton. Mackworth Dolben was himself an 'enthusiastic' amateur architect. There is also a range of fine ancillary buildings: the Museum Tower, the Bell Tower and the Old Chapel, also listed Grade II. The estate was landscaped with advice from Humphry Repton. Until its dramatic collapse in 1951, the estate was home to the well-known monument, the Volta Tower.

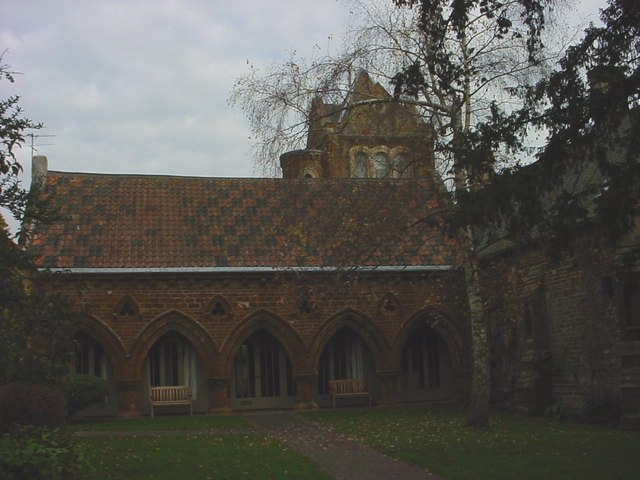
The Old Chapel, Finedon Hall. The Museum Tower is visible in the background.

== Ownership ==
From the early 15th to the 18th century, the manor was in the hands of the Mulso family. On the death of the last of the Mulso line, Tanfield Mulso, Finedon passed to his daughter, Anne. She married Sir Gilbert Dolben, 1st Baronet, and the house remained in the Dolben family until the death of the last baronet, Sir John English Dolben, in 1837. It then passed to his daughter, Frances. She married William Harcourt Isham Mackworth (1806–1872), a younger son of Sir Digby Mackworth, 3rd Baronet, who took the name of Dolben. Both his heirs were drowned; the elder son William Digby Mackworth Dolben died whilst serving aboard HMS Volta in 1863 and the younger, the noted poet Digby Mackworth Dolben, died aged seventeen while swimming in the River Welland, near South Luffenham in Rutland in 1867. The estate passed to their sister, Ellen, after whose death in 1912 it was divided and sold.

From 1936 the hall was used by the Free French as a rehabilitation centre for allied troops, and was visited on at least one occasion by Charles de Gaulle. The facility was run by Col. Pierre Mallinger, who subsequently bought the hall and used it as a centre to conduct research into tropical diseases. After Mallinger's death in 1971 the hall was sold to Geoffrey St Clair Wade. St Clair Wade's scheme for developing Finedon was not realised, and by the time of his death, the condition of the house had become parlous. The hall was saved, in part, due to the efforts of the Ancient Monuments Society. The house has now been converted into apartments.
