= Peterhead Fish Market =

Fish market in Peterhead, Scotland

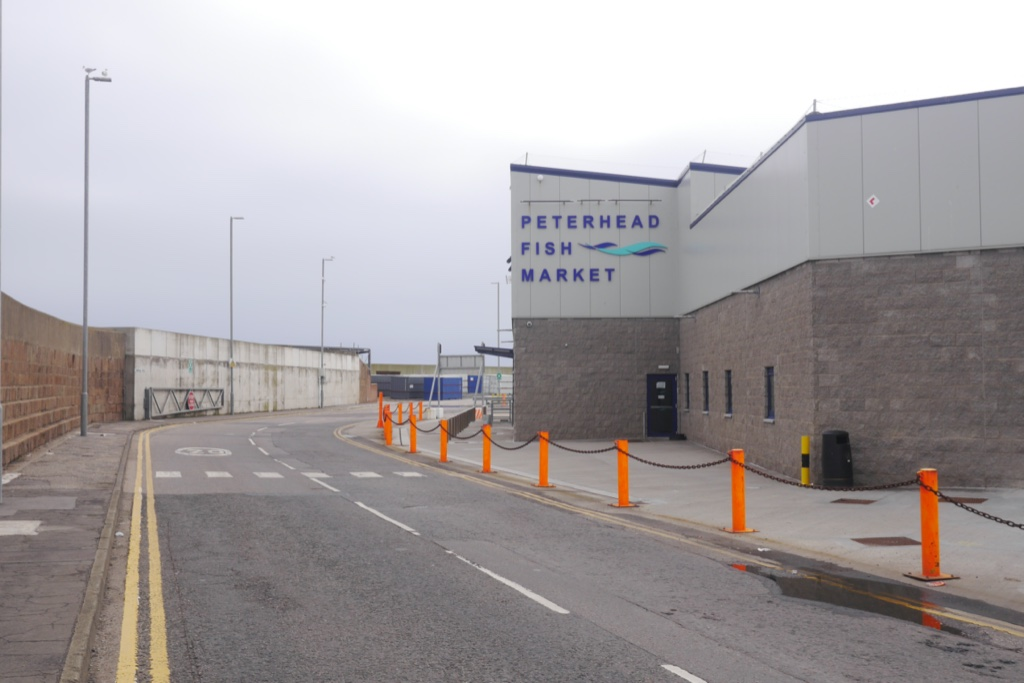
- Peterhead Fish Market in 2020
- Location: Alexandra Parade; Peterhead, Aberdeenshire, Scotland; 57.507068°N 1.771427°W
- Opening date: 2001 (25 years ago)
- Goods sold: seafood
- Website: Official website
- Interactive map of Peterhead Fish Market

Peterhead Fish Market is a fish market in Peterhead, Aberdeenshire, Scotland. Located on Alexandra Parade, in the town's North Harbour, it is owned by Peterhead Port Authority. Peterhead is the UK's biggest fishing port, and its fish market is one of the largest.

Peterhead Harbour's fishing industry consists of three categories of species: demersal, pelagic and shellfish.

The fish market moved to new premises, from Merchants Quay in the nearby South Harbour, in 2018, with Prince Charles performing the ribbon cutting. (His sister, Princess Anne, opened the original building on 27 August 2001.) It was awarded the gold standard AA rating from the British Retail Consortium.

In 2017, fish landings at Peterhead reached £200 million for the first time. It set a new record, £232 million, in 2024.

A boycott by processors in January 2023 forced the fish market to suspend its auctions for the first time in its history.

In 2024, it was reported that Peterhead Port Authority was considering introducing an automated auction system.

The fish market is open weekdays from 7:00 a.m. to private wholesalers.

== In popular culture ==
The BBC television series The Trawlermen shot scenes at the original fish market.
