= Donald Manson =

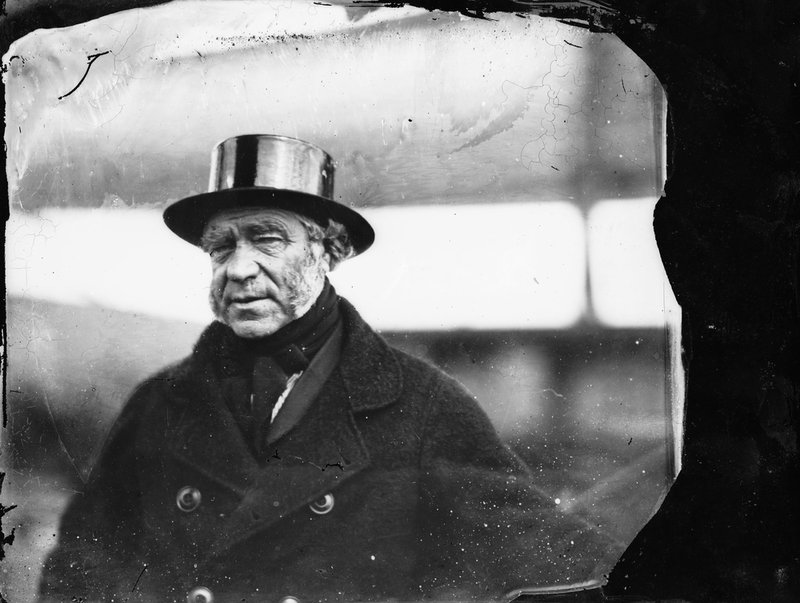
- Manson in 1854
- Born: 1792; Ross and Cromarty, Scotland
- Died: 1880 (aged 87–88); Peterhead, Scotland
- Occupations: Ice master, whaler, harbourmaster

Donald Manson (c. 1792–1880) was an ice master and whaling captain in the northern reaches of the Arctic Ocean in the 19th century. He served on 42 whaling voyages as of 1854, and was first mate of the Sophia during the First Grinnell Expedition in 1850. He was hired as ice master for numerous expeditions for his skill of navigating the icy waters of Greenland and further north, including Edward Augustus Inglefield's 1853 expedition aboard HMS Phoenix. Manson also captained at least one voyage of Scottish emigrants to Pictou in Nova Scotia in 1842, and the pioneers praised him as "humane and gentlemanly." He served as harbourmaster of Peterhead Harbour from the 1840s until his death.

A painting of Captain Manson is on display in the Arbuthnot Museum in Peterhead.
