= George Morell =

George Morell may refer to:

- George W. Morell (1815–1883), civil engineer, lawyer, farmer and Union general in the American Civil War
- George Morell (Michigan judge) (1786–1845), American lawyer and judge

== See also ==
- George Morrell (disambiguation)
