= Robert Spencer Robinson =

Roual Navy Admiral (1809–1889)

Admiral Sir Robert Spencer Robinson KCB FRS
- Born: 6 January 1809; Welford Park, Berkshire
- Died: 27 July 1889 (aged 80); London
- Burial place: Kensal Green Cemetery
- Military career
- Allegiance: United Kingdom
- Branch: Royal Navy
- Rank: Admiral
- Commands: Phoenix; Hydra; Arrogant; Colossus; Royal George; Exmouth
- Conflicts: Crimean War
- Awards: Knight Commander of the Order of the Bath

Admiral Sir Robert Spencer Robinson, KCB, FRS (6 January 1809 – 27 July 1889) was a British naval officer, who served as two five-year terms as Controller of the Navy from February 1861 to February 1871, and was therefore responsible for the procurement of warships at a time when the Royal Navy was changing over from unarmoured wooden ships to ironclads. As a result of the Captain disaster, Robinson was not given a third term as Controller. Robinson has been "described as having one of the best brains of any Victorian admiral".

== Personal life ==
He was born at Welford Park, Berkshire, the son of Sir John Freind Robinson, 1st Baronet (1754–1832), Archdeacon of Armagh, who had changed the family surname from Freind to Robinson in 1793.

On 10 May 1841, he married Clementina, daughter of Admiral Sir John Louis.

== Early naval career ==
Robinson entered the Navy on 6 December 1821. He was promoted to lieutenant on 27 September 1830, and from 5 May 1831 until 1834 served as lieutenant in the 50-gun razee frigate Dublin, commanded by Lord James Townshend. Dublin was flagship on the South America station. In 1836 he was appointed to the 84-gun two-decker Asia. Asia was commissioned on 18 March 1836 by Captain William Fisher, and served in the Mediterranean. On 26 September 1837, he was appointed to the 28-gun frigate Tyne, which had been commissioned on 5 September 1837 by Captain John Townshend, and was also serving in Mediterranean. On 28 June 1838, he was promoted to commander.

In April 1839, he completed a book: The Nautical Steam Engine Explained, and Its Powers and Capabilities Described for the Officers of the Navy and Others Interested in the Important Results of Steam Navigation.

On 20 July 1839 he was appointed captain of the 6-gun paddle-sloop Phoenix, serving in the Mediterranean. However the captain of the 4-gun paddle-sloop Hydra, Commander Anthony William Milward died, and Robinson was appointed to Hydra (also serving in the Mediterranean). A replacement for Robinson as captain of the Phoenix was appointed on 1 March 1840. Under Robinson Hydra took part in Commodore Charles Napier's attack on Sidon in September 1840. Robinson was promoted to captain on 5 November 1840; a replacement for Robinson as captain of Hydra was appointed on 26 December 1840.

== Captain Robinson ==
In 1847, he wrote "Observations on the Steam Ships of the Royal Navy".

On 15 February 1850, Robinson was appointed as captain of the 46-gun screw-frigate Arrogant in the Channel Fleet off Lisbon, where he replaced Captain Robert Fitzroy. Arrogant paid off at Portsmouth on 26 September 1852.

On 15 June 1854, Robinson commissioned the new 80-gun screw two-decker Colossus at Portsmouth. Colossus served on the North America and West Indies station in 1854, and then in 1855 in the Baltic during what is now called the Crimean War. Robinson left Colossus on 24 January 1856.

On 13 February 1856, Robinson was appointed captain of the 102-gun screw three-decker Royal George, which was one of the ships that transported the British Army back from the Crimea after the conclusion of the campaign there. The Royal George paid off at Sheerness on 28 August 1856.

On 25 August 1856, Robinson was appointed Superintendent of the Steam Reserve at Devonport, flying his flag in the 60-gun screw 'blockship' Ajax. from 1 February 1858 until May 1859, he was captain of the 90-gun screw-two-decker Exmouth guard ship of ordinary, Devonport.

Robinson was promoted to rear admiral on 9 June 1860.

== Controller ==
On 7 Feb 1861 Rear Admiral Sir Baldwin Wake Walker resigned as Controller of the Navy. Rear Admiral Robinson was appointed to replace him.

According to historian Howard Fuller, Robinson "was an iron-willed administrator for an ironclad age. Bitterly dissatisfied with the private contractors as well as dockyard obfuscation, Robinson steadily applied pressure on the Board for greater control and greater centralisation, not just in the hands of Their Lordships, but more his own. It was the only way to directly insure the work would be completed as required. In the person of Chief Constructor, Edward Reed, the Controller was able to combine the new architecture of naval power with its execution.'"

Robinson is chiefly important for his remarkable career as Controller of the Navy (1861–71). The royal dockyards were a byword for inefficiency, under siege and the subject of an inquiry by a royal commission, with Robinson as secretary, when he was appointed Controller in 1861. Arguing that the dockyards were great manufacturing establishments and should be, but were not, managed according to the principles followed by successful manufacturers, he drew up a plan of dockyard reorganisation. This the First Lord of the Admiralty H.C.E. Childers (1868–71) carried out, although not completely or altogether faithfully, in 1869-70. Much was still unsettled when Childers suffered a nervous breakdown, from overwork and grief over the loss of his son in the Captain disaster (1870), for which he blamed Robinson and Robinson’s protégé the Chief Constructor Edward Reed, and resigned, leaving the Admiralty in disarray. Parliamentary inquiries over several years following Childers’s resignation led either to modification or repeal of certain of the reforms. All were, however, ultimately vindicated.

Robinson was promoted to vice admiral on 2 April 1866. He was appointed Knight Commander of the Bath, on the civil list on 7 December 1868, and Fellow of the Royal Society on 3 June 1869.

One of the types vessels Robinson had built when he was Controller were "shallow-draft ironclads which were passed off as 'coast defence vessels' but which were... viewed by their designers at the Admiralty as offensive weapons, specifically intended for attacking coastal fortifications and naval arsenals. In urging the construction of several such vessels in 1866, Vice-Admiral Sir Robert Spencer Robinson, stated that they were 'intended either for coast defences, or the attack of shipping in an enemy harbour.'... This was never systematically codified as anything like a 'strategy' in the modern sense of the word, and indeed for every blazing reference to 'assaulting an enemy's coast' in British newspapers, many more authorities expressed their professional doubts. In short, the Royal Navy never really developed an alternative strategy to the close blockade, an alternative built round destroying enemy vessels before they could utilize their ability to evade blockaders. The 'coast defence' battleships, along with the gun- and later torpedo boats were, in the words of Andrew Lambert, 'the cutting edge of British strategy, their function... to destroy fleets sheltering inside their bases..." But a plan was never actually formulated (the closest being the disastrous Dardanelles campaign in the First World War) and coastal defence counter-measures—iron-plated granite forts mounting the heaviest ordnance possible, mines, and obstructions--'counter deterred' much more effectively, cheaply and reliably.

Historian John Beeler speculated that "Throughout the 1860s [Robert] Spencer Robinson consistently rated the British ironclad fleet inferior to its cross-Channel rival, in order to lend weight to his campaigns for enlarged and accelerated shipbuilding programmes. In late 1867, for instance, he wrote that a 'comparison was made between the armoured ships of England and those of France; it was pointed out [in the autumn of 1866] that, on the whole we were manifestly inferior in the number of our ironclads to that Power, taking into account those that were building... The inferiority in the number of ironclad ships, which existed in 1866 still exists in 1867.' [Robert] Spencer Robinson counted thirty-nine English ironclads to forty-six French." Beeler claimed that "At no time after 1865 was Britain's lead in completed ironclads endangered. [Robert] Spencer Robinson [and his colleagues] Milne and Corry thus serves as wonderful examples of what defence analyst Edward Luttwak has termed 'amoral navalism'; professionals agitating for the enlargement of the force at their disposal without regard for either the constraints imposed by politics and foreign policy (or any other factors for that matter), or the actual menace posed by rival forces." While Robinson and other prominent Board members did worry about Britain's real 'supremacy' at sea, at least in terms of ironclads afloat and the power of the guns they carried, there is no actual evidence to support Beeler's theory that they were somehow putting on a show for gullible members of Parliament (including those with naval experience themselves). Problems with ironclad construction, arguments over design in everything from turrets to plating schemes to ordnance, and rising costs were real. Other powers were investing in both sea-going ironclads and coastal defence measures, which increasingly put the British Royal Navy under pressure to remain at par, let alone 'undisputed', at sea—and certainly not indomitable against a rival maritime power's own coastline.

In the 1868 General Election. the Liberals, won a majority, and William Ewart Gladstone became Prime Minister on 9 December 1868. The custom in those days was for the Board of Admiralty to resign when there was a change of government. On 18 December 1868, Vice-Admiral Robinson was given a seat on the Board of Admiralty as well as holding the office of Controller, becoming the Third Lord and Controller. The new First Lord of the Admiralty, Hugh Culling Eardley Childers "initiated a determined programme of cost and manpower reductions, fully backed by the Prime Minister, Gladstone described him [Childers] as 'a man likely to scan with a rigid eye the civil expenses of the Naval Service'. He got the naval estimates just below the psychologically important figure of £10,000,000. Childers strengthened his own position as First Lord by reducing the role of the Board of Admiralty to a purely formal one, making meetings rare and short and confining the Sea Lords rigidly to the administrative functions... Initially Childers had the support of the influential Controller of the Navy, Vice-Admiral Sir [Robert] Spencer Robinson."

According to Beeler, "In 1870 [Robert] Spencer Robinson counted the British ironclad force at thirty-nine ships, and that of France at forty-one, claiming that France had a superiority of numbers in heavy guns, and concluded that '[a]t this moment an alliance between France and so small a naval power as Holland would turn most seriously the naval preponderance against England...' With all this [the First Naval Lord] [Admiral S.C.] Dacres cordially concurred, pointing out especially that '[t]there is no doubt that we are outnumbered by some ten vessels of the special service class [i.e. coast and harbour defence vessels] of French ships.'"" After the end of the Franco-Prussian War and "Robinson's departure from the Admiralty, calmer more balanced heads prevailed, and more rational assessments of the technological disparity between the two battlefleets were soon forthcoming." The earliest French ironclads were wooden-hulled—though fully armoured, unlike HMS Warrior for example—and there was the likelihood of hull-rot. But by the time these vessels were in anything like real danger (as late as 1877 they were still reported as perfectly sea-going) technology had already made both their 4.75-inch-thick iron armour plating and their capacity for mounting the latest heavy guns (over 30 tons each) hopelessly obsolete. Warrior, with her fine iron hull by contrast, remained afloat, also obsolete and largely out of the picture. The French were the first to introduce steel hull-construction, in 1876. The British Admiralty followed suit years later. Technology remained a double-edged sword for both Britain and France in this period.

When Robinson's subordinate, the Chief Constructor, Edward Reed resigned in July 1870, Robinson described this as a national disaster.

On 2 June 1870 Robinson had been placed on the retired list against his will, courtesy of Childers' new scheme of naval retirement. His name was kept on the active list as supplementary while in office. His second five-year term as Controller came to an end on 9 February 1871, and he was succeeded as Third Lord and Controller by Captain Robert Hall.

== Retirement ==
He was promoted to Admiral on the retired list on 14 July 1871. In 1871 he wrote "Results of Admiralty Organisation as Established by Sir James Graham and Mr Childers".

The New York Times published the following on 13 September 1871: "The entire ship-building interest of Hull, England, is reported to have been purchased by a Company, of who the leading officers are Vice-Admiral Robert Spencer Robinson and Naval Constructor Reid [sic]."

It has been claimed that Robinson stood at the 1873 Kingston upon Hull by-election, but he was never nominated, his friend Reed stood (and was defeated) instead.

== Death ==
Robinson died at his residence 61 Eaton Place, London on 27 July 1889, and is buried in Kensal Green Cemetery.

== See also ==
- O'Byrne, William Richard (1849). "Robinson, Robert Spencer" . A Naval Biographical Dictionary . John Murray – via Wikisource.

== Footnotes ==
Military offices
Preceded by Sir Baldwin Wake Walker	Controller of the Navy; 1861–1871	Succeeded by Robert Hall
Preceded by Henry Seymour as Third Naval Lord	Third Lord of the Admiralty; 1869–1871	Succeeded by Robert Hall
