= Frederick Hutton (Royal Navy officer) =

British naval officer (1801–1866)

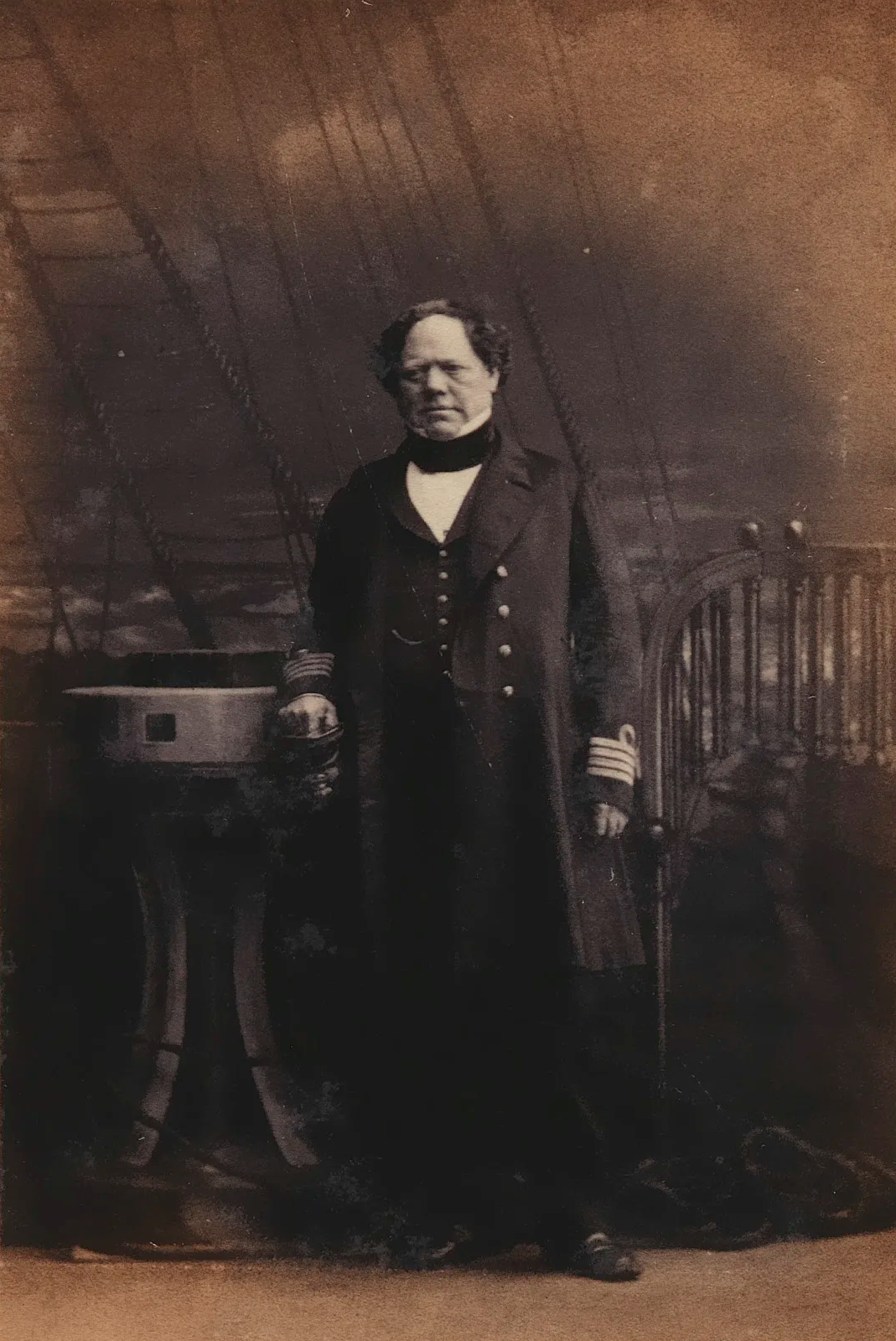
Hutton in 1862

Rear-Admiral Frederick Hutton (1801 – 6 March 1866) was a British naval officer.

Hutton was born in 1801, and entered the Royal Navy in early 1813. He rose through the ranks, becoming a lieutenant in 1825, a commander in 1838, and a captain on 3 July 1844. He served as Administrator of Ascension Island from 1847 to 1851, before returning to active naval duties. In April 1863 he was appointed to the rank of Rear admiral.

Hutton's commands included captaincy of the store ship Tortoise (1846–47), which brought with it the governorship of Ascension Island, the Prince Regent (1852–54), and the Neptune (1854–56), the latter two being flagships of Rear admiral Armar Lowry Corry, firstly out of Portsmouth, and then in the Baltic Sea during the Crimean War. Hutton captained Rear admiral James Plumridge's flagship the Royal William from 1856 to 1857, before becoming captain of the Bermuda-based guard ship Terror in 1857.

Rear admiral Frederick Hutton died at Tunbridge Wells on 6 March 1866.

Government offices
Preceded by Arthur Fleming Morrell	Administrator of Ascension Island; 1847–1851	Succeeded by William Hewgill Kitchen
