= George Truman Morrell =

British naval officer (1830–1912)

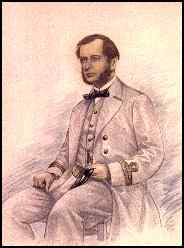
- Commander George Truman Morrell, RN
- Born: 29 January 1830; Dinan, France
- Died: 7 May 1912 (aged 82) Belvedere, Kent, England
- Allegiance: United Kingdom of Great Britain and Ireland
- Branch: Royal Navy
- Service years: 1842-1873
- Rank: Commander
- Commands: HMS Investigator HMS Sparrow

Commander George Truman Morrell RN (29 January 1830 – 7 May 1912) was a British naval, officer and explorer active during the Victorian era.

== Early years ==
George Truman Morrell was born 29 January 1830 in Dinan, Brittany, France, a British subject. He was the second son of a naval officer, Arthur Fleming Morrell, and Elizabeth Reid, who was the daughter of a pay officer at the Plymouth Dockyard. His eldest brother, Charles Walter Morrell, died in 1839, aged 11.

His younger brother, Arthur Morrell, also born in Dinan became a Rear-Admiral in the Royal Navy.

== Career ==
He joined the Royal Navy in 1842 at age 10, a first class volunteer aboard HMS Calcutta, Captain George Frederick Rich commanding.

He would spend seven years as a midshipman, before becoming a mate aboard HMS Excellent in 1849. He was then acting lieutenant on several occasions, before being confirmed to that rank in 1851.

In 1866, the Foreign Office reported on "great judgement" displayed by Morrell during a daring expedition up the Niger River aboard HMS Investigator, a journey he documented in his journal.

During his naval career, Morrell served aboard the following ships:

- 1842, HMS Calcutta
- 1842–1843, HMS Monarch
- 1843–1845, HMS Aigle
- 1845, HMS Formidable
- 1845, HMS Siren
- 1849, HMS Excellent
- 1849–1850, HMS Phoenix
- 1850–1851, HMS Helia
- 1851–1852, HMS Philomel
- 1852–1853, HMS Daring
- 1853–1856, HMS Imaum
- 1861–1865, HMS Wellesley
- 1865, HMS Espoir
- 1865, HMS Investigator
- 1865–1866, HMS Sparrow
- 1866, HMS Espoir
- 1866–1867, HMS Wellesley
- 1867, HMS Fisgard
- 1867–1868, HMS Wellesley
- 1869–1873, HMS Trafalgar

He was paid off from the navy in 1869, and then served for a short period with the coast guard in Sligo, Ireland, as a division lieutenant. He documented his final year of service in Ireland in another journal, filled with details such as the loss of ships and crew, the recovery of drowning victims ("30th June - Bodies of two young women aged about 16 & 18 both sweetly pretty, laying in our boat house, having been brought off Black rocks near L. House on Saturday, to await coroner's inquest on Monday, 30th June"), and discipline meted out to coast guardsmen ("Sept. 9th - Mr. King to lose one good conduct stripe").

== Marriage and family ==
Morrell married Ellen Mary Stretton (born c. 1835 - died 21 December 1903), of Islington, in a ceremony on 29 August 1861, at St Michael, Highgate, Middlesex. The family was mainly settled in Kent, however his son Patrick was born in Dublin, Ireland, during his service in the coast guard.

Together, they had at least 10 children:

- Arthur Wellesley Morrell, who also joined the Royal Navy, becoming a Paymaster Captain
- William George Henry Morrell, who was a cable ship captain
- Rosa Elizabeth Morrell
- Douglas Henry Morrell, another merchant seaman, who died in 1903
- Alice Fanny Morrell
- Maud Lucy Morrell
- Patrick Frank Arthur Morrell, later a vicar
- Edith Georgina Morrell
- George Edwin Morrell, a merchant engineer officer
- Frank Alfred Morrell

== Death ==
George Truman Morrell lived in Belvedere, Kent, at the time of his death on 7 May 1912.

== First West Africa expedition ==
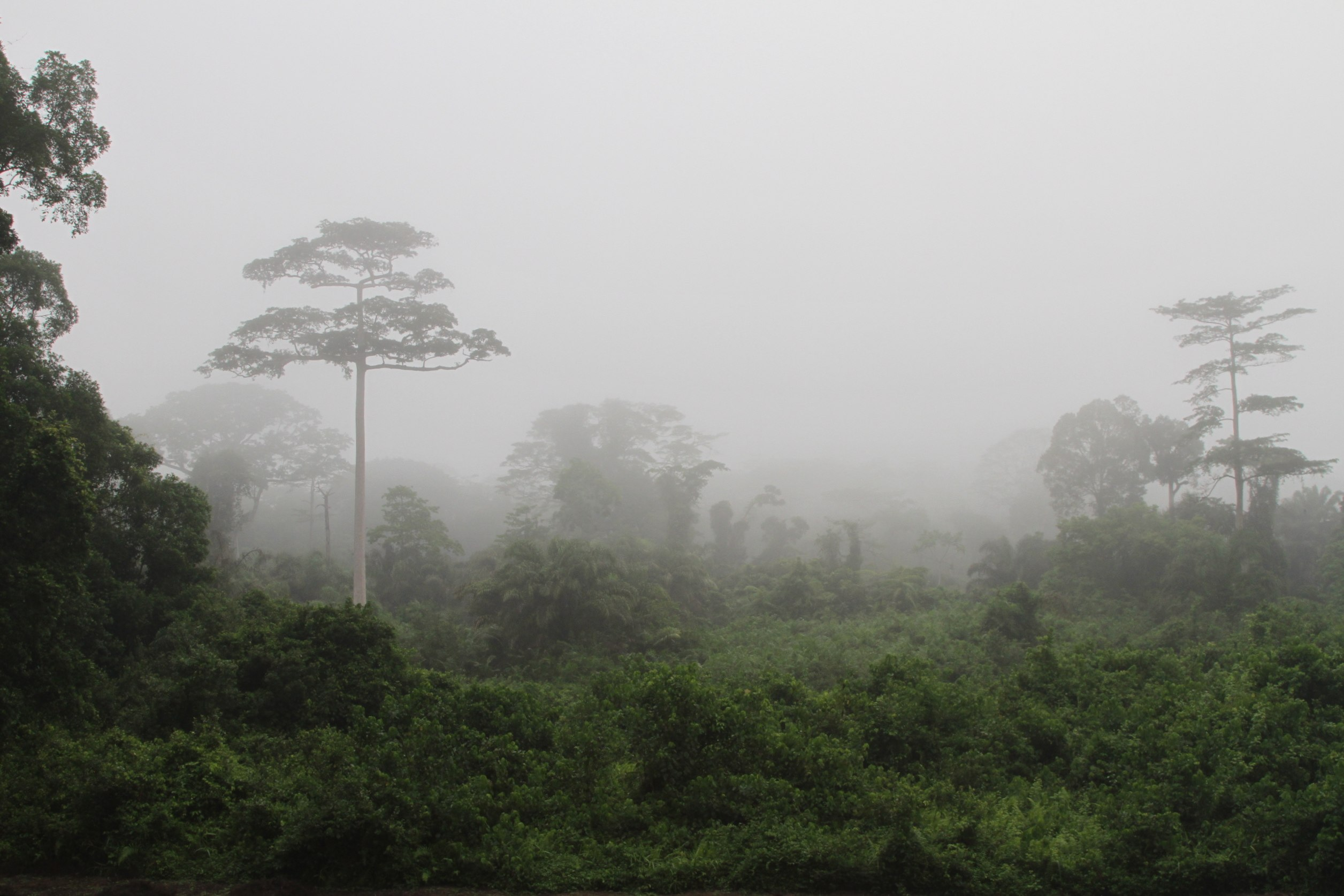
The area in what has since become southwestern Ivory Coast explored by Morrell

In the early 1860s Morrell made maps of several parts of the coast of West Africa, including what has since become the southwestern parts of Ivory Coast.

He also observed native fauna in that region such as the pygmy hippopotamus and western chimpanzee. People in the region spoke the Guéré language which Morrell attempted to document. Travelling further along the coast on the same expedition he made extensive maps of an area further east, near the settlement of Assinie-Mafia where he made maps of the Aby Lagoon and the surrounding area.

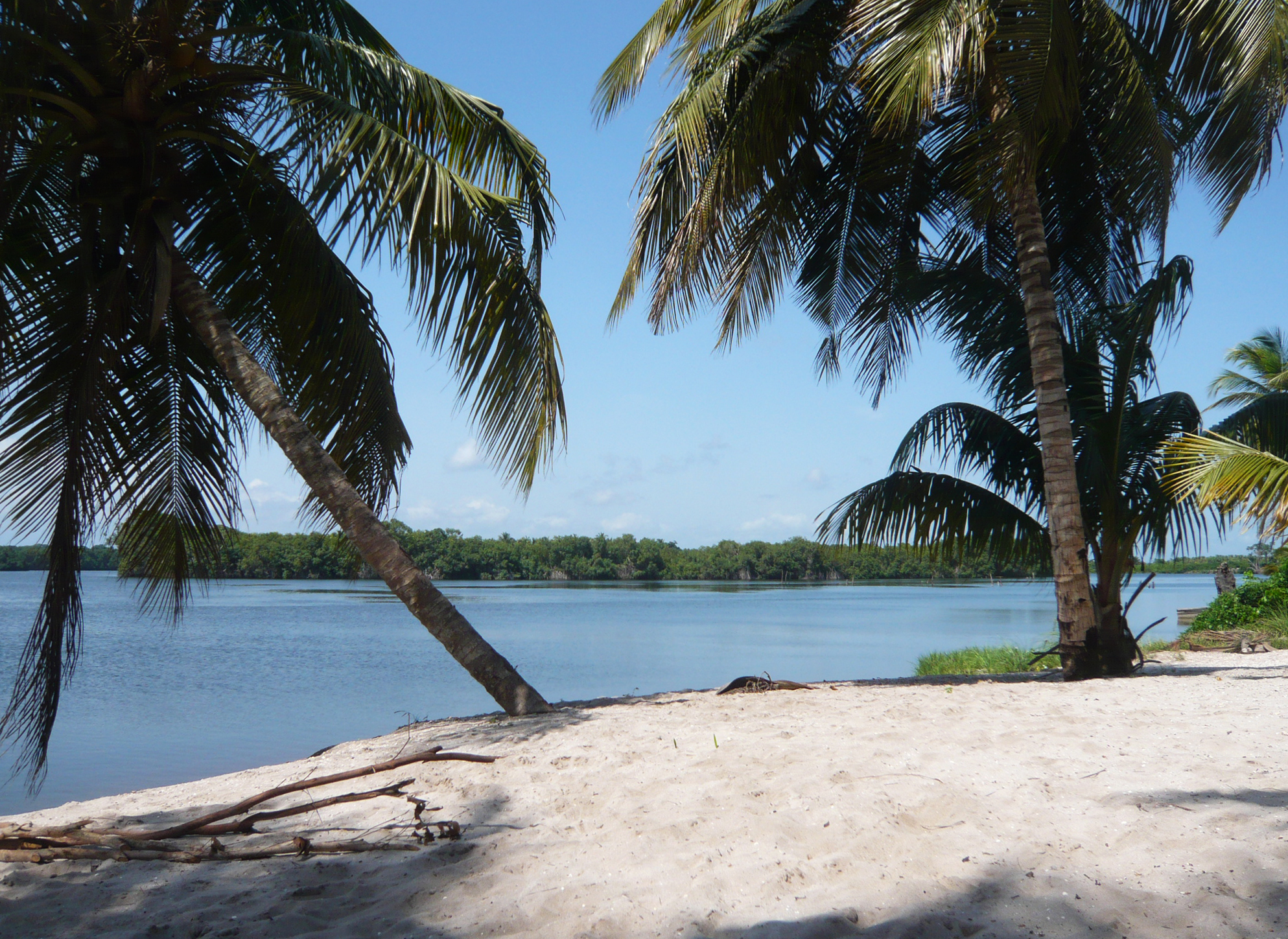
The area near the Aby Lagoon which was mapped by Morrell

After this Morrell returned to England and took up residency in the Cotswolds region.

== Niger River expedition ==
Due to the success of his previous mission to West Africa, Morrell was given command of another, far more ambitious expedition.

In late 1865, Morrell, who was then a lieutenant, was given command of HMS Investigator, a steam-powered, flat-bottomed British navy gunship. He spent the next several months steaming the ship up the Niger River, bringing gifts from the British government, in Queen Victoria's name, to tribal kings and elders along the river.

During the voyage, Morrell mediated a dispute between British colonists and Obi Akazue, who reigned amongst the people at Onitsha, Nigeria. He observed first-hand the slave trade, which flourished locally despite the cessation of the trade throughout most of the western world.

He recorded his interactions in a handwritten diary, including coloured illustrations of aspects of contemporary West African life along the river, such as this drawing of a brass canoe fitted with an awning and armed with cannons, used for local trade along the river.

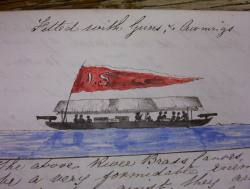
Brass canoe "fitted with guns & awnings"
