= HMS Investigator (1861) =

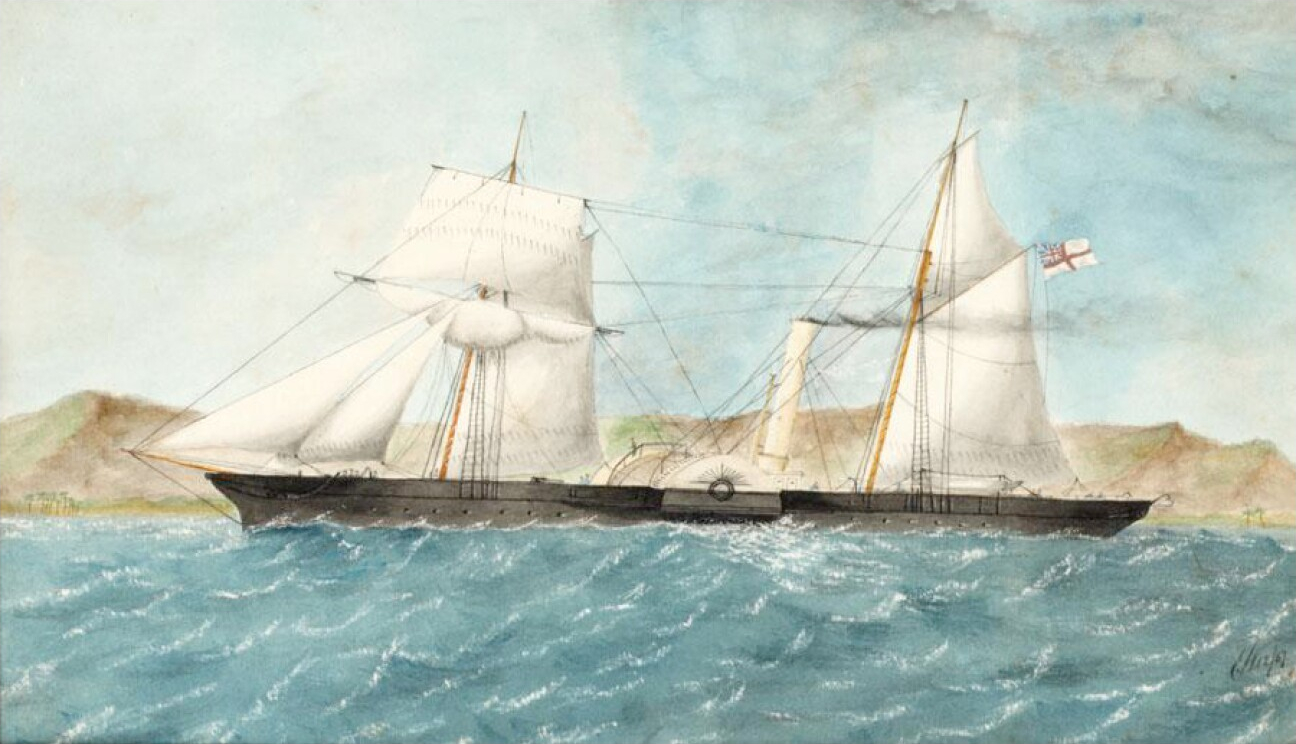
- Investigator off the coast of Africa in 1867

History

United Kingdom
- Name: HMS Investigator
- Builder: Deptford Dockyard
- Laid down: 15 June 1861
- Launched: 16 November 1861
- Fate: Sold to the local authorities at Lagos in 1869

General characteristics
- Class & type: Paddle survey vessel
- Tons burthen: 149 tons
- Length: 121 ft (37 m)
- Beam: 16 ft (4.9 m)
- Draught: 7 ft 5 in (2.26 m)
- Propulsion: Paddle wheels; 34 nhp
- Armament: 2 guns

HMS Investigator was a wooden paddle survey vessel of the Royal Navy, built to carry out an expedition on the Gabon River in Africa.

Investigator was laid down on 15 June 1861 at Deptford and was launched on 16 November 1861. She was initially commanded by Lieutenant Benjamin Langlois Lefroy off the west coast of Africa. On 1 September 1863, Lieutenant Commander William Digby Dolben of Investigator drowned while crossing the bar of Lagos when the gig, a four-oar whaler, was swamped. He was succeeded by Lt Charles Knowles, later Vice Admiral Sir Charles Knowles, 4th baronet whose expedition August–October 1864 up the Niger was published in the Royal Geographical Society Journal in January 1865. He was succeeded by George Truman Morrell in 1865, under whose command she sailed up the River Niger, making contact with local tribes. In 1867, she ran aground in the River Niger and came under attack from hostile inhabitants, who were armed with cannon. Two of her crew were killed. She was refloated after 11 days and taken in to Lagos in a severely damaged condition. Investigator was sold to the local authorities at Lagos in 1869.
