= Sir Edward Hughes (1784 EIC ship) =

Transport ship turned Royal British frigate

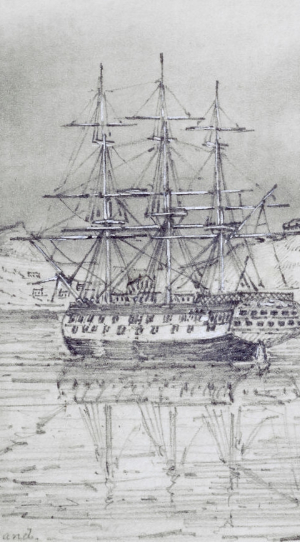
- HMS Tortoise, 1 Sept 1853

History

East India Company
- Name: Sir Edward Hughes
- Namesake: Sir Edward Hughes
- Builder: Bombay Dockyard
- Launched: 22 March 1784, or 1788
- Fate: Sold

Great Britain
- Name: HMS Sir Edward Hughes
- Renamed: HMS Tortoise
- Fate: Lost in 1859, or broken up in 1860 or 1863

General characteristics
- Type: East Indiaman
- Tons burthen: 957, or 95768/94, or 960, or 9625/94 (bm)
- Length: Overall; 146 ft 8 in (44.7 m) or; 147 ft 2 in (44.9 m); Keel: 116 ft 10 1/2 in (35.6 m) or; 118 ft 4 7/8 in (36.1 m)
- Beam: 39 ft 3 in (12.0 m); 39 ft 1 in (11.9 m)
- Depth of hold: 14 ft 0 in (4.3 m); 19 ft 4 1/2 in (5.9 m)
- Sail plan: Full-rigged ship
- Complement: 1794: 99; 1803:205; Storeship:90
- Armament: 1794: 26 × 9- & 4-pounder guns; 1803: 40 × 9- & 12- & 18-pounder guns; Frigate:38 guns; Storeship: Upper deck: 20 × 9-pounder guns; Fc: 2 × 9-pounder guns; Convict transport: 2 × 18-pounder carronades; Ascension Island: 10 guns
- Notes: Three decks. Teak built.

Sir Edward Hughes was launched in 1784 as an East Indiaman for the British East India Company (EIC). She spent four years as a country ship, i.e., sailing in the East Indies but without going to Britain. Then between 1788 and 1803 she made eight voyages to India and China for the EIC. In 1804 the EIC sold Sir Edward Hughes to the British Royal Navy, which commissioned her as a 38-gun frigate. The Navy renamed her Tortoise in 1807 and converted her to a storeship in 1808. After the end of the Napoleonic Wars she became variously a coal depot, a hulk, and then a convict transport. In 1844 she became a receiving ship at Ascension Island. She was lost there in 1859, or broken up there in 1860, or 1863.

== Design issues ==
Indian shipwrights built water tanks or cisterns into their vessels that made the use of water butts or casks unnecessary. These tanks were perfectly water tight and saved stowage and manual labour. However, in their designs, the shipwrights did not prioritize sailing speed.

== EIC service ==
She was named after Admiral Sir Edward Hughes, the outgoing Commander-in-Chief, East Indies Station, who retired in 1784. Between 1784 and 1788, Sir Edward Hughes traded locally in India. Thereafter she made nine voyages to China or India, with one to the West Indies under contract to the Navy in between the voyages for the EIC.

=== First EIC voyage (1788–1789) ===
Captain Joseph Smith left Bombay on 21 August 1788. Sir Edward Hughes arrived at Whampoa anchorage on 14 October. Outward bound, she crossed the Second Bar on 26 December, reached St Helena on 19 March 1789, and arrived at the Downs on 17 May.

=== Second EIC voyage (1790–1791) ===
Captain Robert Anderson left the Downs on 14 March 1790, reached Madras on 1 July and Penang on 15 August, before arriving at Whampoa on 4 October. Homeward-bound, Sir Edward Hughes crossed the Second Bar on 18 December, reached the Cape on 9 April 1791, and St Helena on 28 April, and arrived at the Downs on 28 June.

=== Third EIC voyage (1792–1793) ===
Captain Anderson left Falmouth on 15 February 1792, reached Madras on 9 June, Penang on 29 July, and Malacca on 30 August. They arrived at Whampoa on 26 September. Homeward-bound, she crossed the Second Bar on 26 November, arrived at St Helena on 19 March 1793, and arrived at Portsmouth on 9 June.

=== Fourth EIC voyage (1794–1795) ===
Captain Anderson received a letter of marque on 16 January 1794. However, he did not sail Sir Edward Hughes again. Instead, Captain James Urmston received a letter of marque on 10 May.

Under Urmston'a command, Sir Edward Hughes left Plymouth on 22 June 1794. She arrived at the Cape on 9 September, and Bombay on 1 December. She left Tellicherry on 18 January 1795, reached St Helena on 18 March, and arrived at the Downs on 23 July.

=== West Indies voyage (1795-6) ===
In 1796, Sir Edward Hughes sailed as part of Admiral Hugh Cloberry Christian's expedition to the West Indies. She carried hospital tents, bedding, and stores. After numerous starts aborted by weather issues, the fleet sailed on 20 March, to invade St Lucia, with troops under Lieutenant-General Sir Ralph Abercromby. St Lucia surrendered to the British on 25 May. The British went on to capture Saint Vincent and Grenada. Sir Edward Hughes returned to Britain in September 1796.

=== Fifth EIC voyage (1797-1798) ===
Captain Urmston and Sir Edward Hughes left Plymouth 22 February 1797. She reached the Cape on 4 May, and arrived at Bombay on 4 July. She then sailed back and forth along the Malabar and Coromandel coasts. She visited Tellicherry (9 October), Cochin (18 October), Anjengo (24 October), Calicut (1 November), Tellicherry (14 November), Calicut (25 November), Cannanore (1 December), Tellicherry (7 December), Cannanore (16 December), and Tellicherry 28 December. She was at Bombay on 9 January 1798. (She had carried Major Lachlan Macquarie, Jonathan Duncan Governor of Bombay, and General Stuart from Calicut to Bombay. By 28 April, she had reached the Cape, and by 26 May, St Helena. She arrived at the Downs on 2 August.

=== Sixth EIC voyage (1799–1800) ===
Urmston sailed Sir Edward Hughes from Portsmouth on 2 April 1799, and arrived at Bombay on 23 July. She was at Goa on 6 September, Managalore on 18 September, Calicut on 24 September, and Madras on 5 October. She reached the Cape on 30 December, and St Helena on 27 January 1800, before arriving at the Downs on 30 May.

=== Seventh EIC voyage (1800–1) ===
Sir Edward Hughes left Portsmouth on 5 September 1800, and reached Madeira by 23 September. Sir Edward Hughes, Price William Henry, Basket, master, and Hawke, Baker, master, were reported to have been "all well" on 11 November at 28°11′S 27°23′W. She reached Madras on 29 January 1801. She then visited Masulipatam (23 March), Narsipore (25 March), Coninga (28 March), and Vizagapatam (31 March). She reached the Cape on 12 July, and St Helena on 14 August. She arrived at the Downs on 31 October.

=== Eighth voyage (1802–1803) ===
Captain Urmston was still in command of Sir Edward Hughes when she sailed from the Downs on 18 April 1802. She was reported to have been "all well" on 5 May at 28°35′N 19°14′W. She reached Johanna on 9 August, and arrived at Bombay on 29 August. She visited Surat on 13 October, but returned to Bombay by 22 October. She then visited Tellicherry (2 November), Cochin (12 November), Calicut (19 November), Mahé (24 November), Tellicherry (25 November), and Managalore (29 November), before returning to Bombay by 8 December. When she left Bombay she again carried Lachlan Macquarie, who was returning to Britain. Sir Edward Hughes was at Mahé on 13 January 1803 and Calicut two days later. She reached the Cape on 5 March, and St Helena on 25 March, before arriving back at the Downs on 9 May.

On her return to Britain, the EIC had Sir Edward Hughes fitted as a frigate. Captain Thomas Barrow received a letter of marque on 3 October 1803. This showed her as having doubled her armament and her complement relative to her service as an Indiaman. Barrow sailed from Portsmouth 26 October 1803, with destination Madras and with the EIC intending her to remain in the Far East.

=== Ninth EIC voyage (1804) ===
On this voyage, she was reported to have been "all well" at 40°N 15°W on 11 November. On 19 June 1804, she sailed from Madras to Bombay to go into dock to fix leaks. Still, on 12 July, she captured the French slave ship Jeune Clementine at 4°18′S 64°0′E. Jeune Clementine had a crew of 15 men and was carrying 180 captives.

== Royal Navy ==
=== Transfer to the Navy ===
The Royal Navy purchased Sir Edward Hughes in May 1804 in India for £35,000. However, the notice of her capturing Jeune Clementine in July still refers to Sir Edward Hughes as belonging to the EIC. Furthermore, some records state that the EIC presented her to the Navy in 1805. (Note: On 21 May 1806, the Court of Directors of the EIC held a meeting to suspend a portion of the Company's by-laws to enable the company to purchase or build two ships to replace Sir Edward Hughes, and Britannia. Britannia had been wrecked on the Brazilian coast on 1 November 1805, while participating in Sir Home Popham's expedition to the Cape. Her cargo was charged to the British government.)

=== HMS Sir Edward Hughes ===
The Royal Navy commissioned Sir Edward Hughes in 1805, under the command of Commander Hood Christian. Immediately Rear-Admiral Sir Edward Pellew, Commander-in-Chief of the East Indies Station, had her escorting convoys.

In 1806, Captain Gilbert Heathcote replaced Christian. On 6 June 1806, Sir Edward Hughes escorted Ganges to Bombay as Ganges was leaky and had to interrupt her return to Britain in order to undergo repairs. (Note: Ganges then remained at Bombay until 27 February 1807.) In September, Captain Edward Ratsey replaced Heathcote.

In December, Sir Edward Hughes was part of a squadron under Rear-Admiral Sir Thomas Troubridge, in Blenheim, and including Harrier. By 27 March 1807, Sir Edward Hughes was at Madras.

By April, the three warships were at Pulo Aura awaiting four East Indiamen coming from China. On 6 April, Blenheim grounded on a sandbank in the Straits of Malacca. It took four days before she could be righted to enable her to return to Penang. Sir Edward Hughes took off her stores, though the heaviest had had to be thrown overboard.

Sir Edward Hughes was next reported to have been near the Equator on 1 June 1807, escorting a convoy to the Cape.

On 19 September Sir Edward Hughes and Scorpion were in company and so shared in the proceeds of the capture on that day of the Danish ship Christle.

Tortoise arrived at Sheerness on 9 October and two days later sailed to Woolwich. There she was put in ordinary in December.

=== HMS Tortoise ===
Sir Edward Hughes was renamed HMS Tortoise on 28 November 1807. Between March and July 1808, Tortoise was at Woolwich being fitted as a storeship for the Royal Navy. In May, Commander Thomas Cook recommissioned her. She was in the Mediterranean in 1812, and at Gibraltar in 1813.

==== Immediate post-war ====
On 2 April 1817, Tortoise was at St Helena. Her captain, Cooke, had an audience with Napoleon.

Between September and November 1824, Tortoise was at Portsmouth being fitted as a coal depot. She was at Milford until 1838.

==== Convict transport ====
Between January and August, Porpoise was at Chatham being fitted for a storeship. James Wood was appointed on 22 May 1841, as master of Tortoise. However, Tortoise's next task was to transport convicts to Van Diemen's Land.

On 12 August, Wood received orders take on convicts, carry them to Van Dieman's Land, and then sail to New Zealand to gather timber and spars for the Navy. Wood had been captain of HMS Buffalo when she had wrecked at Mercury Bay off Whitianga in 1840, on an identical mission. The actual task of identifying trees to be cut down, and marking them, was the responsibility of the Navy's Purveyor of Timber, Thomas Laslett, who had accompanied Wood in Buffalo.

Tortoise departed Plymouth on 26 October, and arrived at Hobart on 19 February 1842, having travelled via the Cape. She had embarked 400 male prisoners, of which three were re-landed and three died on the voyage, and so disembarked 394. The 96th Regiment of Foot provided 103 officers and men to serve as the guard force. There were also some 50 soldiers' wives and children on board.

While Tortoise was at Hobart, HMS Beagle, with Charles Darwin on board, came into port. On 9, or 16 March, Tortoise left Hobart for New Zealand.

==== Gathering wood in New Zealand ====
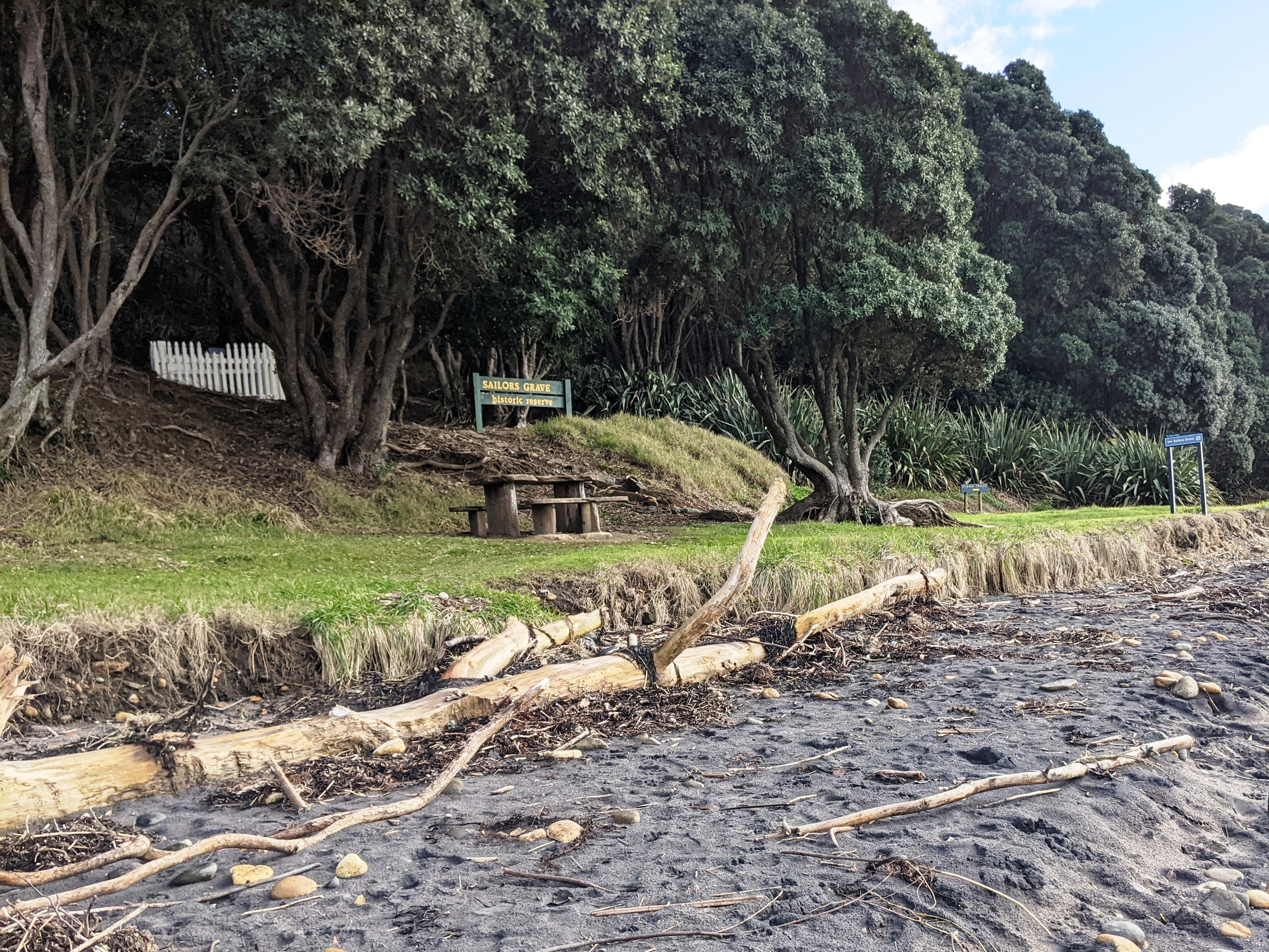
Grave of Able Seaman William Sampson at Te Karo Bay

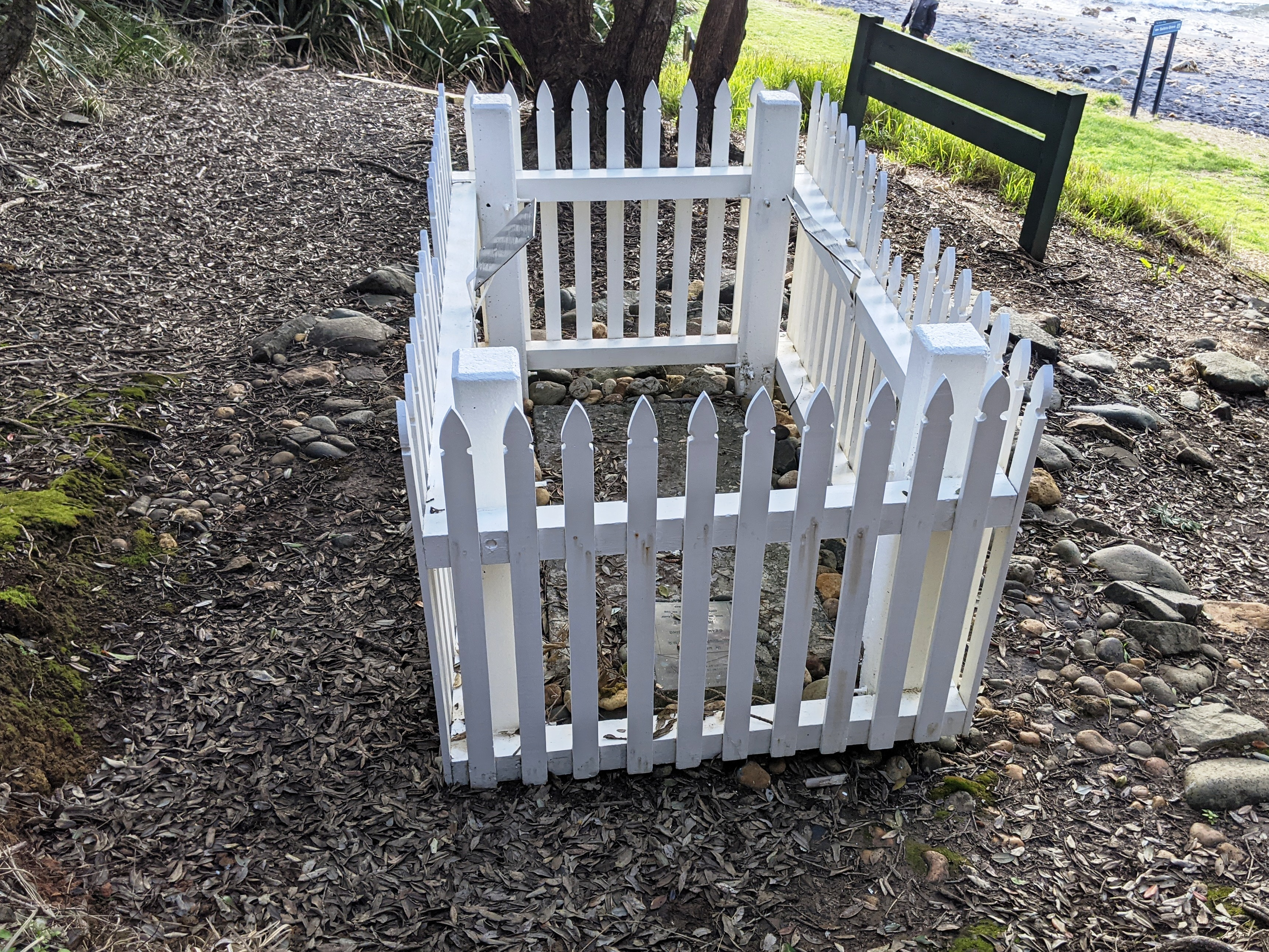
Grave of William Sampson

Tortoise sailed to the Bay of Islands to gather Kauri wood (Agathis australis) for spars for the Navy. Between 21 March and 19 June, Tortoise succeed in gathering 103 masts along New Zealand's Coromandel Coast. While she was at Te Karo Bay on 6 May, Able Seaman William Sampson drowned when her jolly boat overturned in the surf. He was buried in a grave that the Royal New Zealand Navy still maintains.

In 1842, Major Bunbury, of the 80th Regiment of Foot, took 40 to 50 men, half of the force he had brought in 1840 to Auckland from Sydney, and launched a punitive expedition against the Te Arawa tribe at Tauranga. Tortoise provided some support for the expedition. She contributed two 18-pounder carronades, 100 round shot, and 50 rounds of canister, as well as sailors and marines. The Acting Governor of New Zealand exercised some mediation and then withdrew his force when he realised that it was too small to prevail and that the Māori resented the English interfering in their intertribal wars. After the British left, the locals ate some of their prisoners, which is the last recorded incident of this kind in New Zealand. The fortuitous presence of the Tortoise's carronades was essential in giving the expedition gravitas.

Tortoise's expedition was the third, and last, that the Royal Navy mounted to gather kauri-wood spars. (The first had consisted of HMS Coromandel and HMS Dromedary in 1821.) After her return to Britain in October 1843, Tortoise was at Chatham where between December and March 1844, she underwent fitting out as a receiving ship for Ascension Island.

==== Ascension Island ====
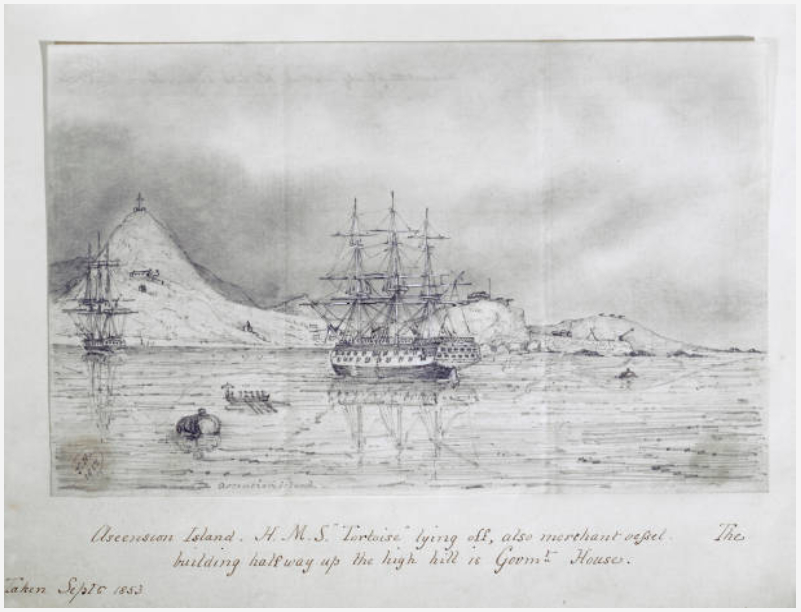
HMS Tortoise at Ascension Sept 1853

Commander William Finlaison sailed Tortoise to Ascension Island in spring 1844. He had been appointed Administrator of the island, but resigned due to poor health after a few months, and was replaced by Commander Arthur Fleming Morrell that October.

On 12 November 1846, Captain Frederick Hutton replaced Morrell in command of Tortoise and as Administrator of Ascension Island. The island was a supply depot for the Royal Navy's West Africa Squadron, which had the task of suppressing the slave trade. In support of that mission, Tortoise had a ship's tender, Snap.

In March 1847, fire broke out in the coal Torotise's hold. Her crew and men from the garrison worked for four days and nights before they could clear all the hold and subdue the fire. Even so, her beams were burnt 3 to 5 inches through.

On 19 August 1848, Rapid, Dart, and Snap were in company when they captured the slave ship Tentador. Tortoise shared Snap's portion of the bounties for the capture. Tentador, of 183 tons, was captured at 6°34′S 12°8′E. The Vice admiralty court at St Helena condemned Tentador. She was subsequently destroyed.

In 1852, William Hewgill Kitchen replaced Hutton. In 1854, Captain William Farquharson Burnett was captain of Tortoise. Then in 1855, Captain G.A.Seymour replaced Burnett.

The merchant vessel The Abyssinian, of 1000 tons, arrived at Ascension Island on 16 May 1856, in a sinking state with five feet of water in her hold and the water rising at a rate of two feet an hour. The master and crew were exhausted from pumping and stated that they were going to abandon her. Instead, between 18 May and 22 July, 111 men, crew from Tortoise and 24 Africans, removed 800 tons of cargo from The Abyssinian, uncovering the leak, which they fixed. Then over 17 days Tortoise's boats returned the cargo. The master tendered a payment of £800. She then continued on her journey to London. The salvors took the case to court, which found that value of the salvage was £23,464. The court ruled that given the value of the vessel and cargo, her state, and the amount of effort expended to save the voyage and cargo, £800 was too little. It awarded them £1,500. Shares were allocated in proportion to the number of days each salvor was employed on the occasion.

Capt. J Elliott replaced Seymour in 1857.

== Fate ==
The fate of Tortoise is a little unclear. The Admiralty issued an order on 18 October 1859, that she be broken up at Ascension Island. However, in 1979, a Royal Navy team of divers searching the waters around Ascension Island for any trace of William Dampier's ship Roebuck, found a number of other wrecks. They identified three: HMS Maeander, lost in 1870; Normandie, an iron sailing ship of 1900, and Soudan, lost in 1892. They also found an older wreck that they speculated was Tortoise, which "broke away from its moorings in 1859". Other reports have her being broken up at Ascension in 1860, or 1863.
