= Arthur Morrell (Royal Navy officer) =

British officer (1788–1880)

Captain Arthur Morrell
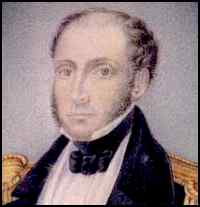

13th Commandant of Ascension Island
- In office 11 October 1844 – 18 January 1847
- Preceded by: John Fraser
- Succeeded by: Frederick Hutton

Personal details
- Born: Arthur Fleming Morrell; 10 November 1788 Stoke Damerel, England
- Died: 13 September 1880 (aged 91) Dartford, Kent, England
- Children: George Truman Morrell
- Awards: Polar medal

Military service
- Allegiance: United Kingdom
- Branch/service: Royal Navy
- Service years: 1801–1856
- Rank: Captain
- Commands: HMS Calcutta; HMS Espoir; HMS Tortoise; HMS Hydra
- Battles/wars: French Revolutionary Wars; Napoleonic Wars; Blockade of Saint-Domingue

Captain Arthur Fleming Morrell (10 November 1788 – 13 September 1880) was a British officer of the Royal Navy, an explorer, and Commandant of Ascension Island, who saw service spanning the end of the Napoleonic era and well into the Victorian era.

== Early life ==
Arthur Morrell was born in 1788 in Stoke Damerel, Devon, the second son of a Royal Navy lieutenant, John Morrell. His father had been an able seaman, rising to the warrant officer's rank of gunner by the time his sons entered the Royal Navy.

== Career ==
=== Royal Navy ===
Morrell's brother was John Arthur Morrell, who became a commander and served aboard HMS Eagle during an 1806 attack on Naples, then held by Napoleon's brother, Joseph Bonaparte. Morrell joined the Royal Navy at the age of about twelve or thirteen as a first class volunteer. He served first on HMS Doris, a 38-gun fifth rate ship in the Channel fleet that took several French ships as prizes during the years Morrell served on her.

He then moved to the Caribbean on board HMS Pique, and was by now a master's mate. It was aboard Pique, a captured French ship formerly named Pallas, that he would take part in the blockade of Saint-Domingue in 1803, serving off Cape Francois. A boat from the Pique, commanded by Lieutenant Nesbit Willoughby, was dispatched to capture the French frigate Clorinde as she fled the rebellious Haitians led by Jean-Jacques Dessalines. Morrell was part of the crew that brought Clorinde under a British flag to Jamaica. Pique later took part in an abortive attempt to capture Curaçao, which in 1804 had been retaken from Britain by a Dutch-French force.

After nine years in the Caribbean, Morrell found himself in the Mediterranean in a succession of ships including HMS Termagant, from which he beheld the fall of Genoa in 1814, one of his last naval actions during the Napoleonic Wars. At the end of hostilities, Britain turned to Arctic exploration to employ its navy and to attempt to discover a shorter route to the resource-rich Pacific.

=== Arctic exploration ===
In 1818, Morrell took part in a "perilous voyage of discovery" to Spitsbergen, in search of the Northwest Passage, in what was one of the earliest voyages of Arctic discovery. The voyage was unsuccessful, but Morrell would later be awarded the Arctic Medal, 1818–55. Captain David Buchan commanded HMS Dorothea, while Morrell served as first lieutenant. The Dorothea was accompanied by HMS Trent, commanded by John Franklin.

As first lieutenant, Morrell kept a detailed log book which provided meteorological observations and navigational notes. The expedition eventually failed to penetrate thick pack ice. The expedition returned to England without having achieved its goal. It would be nearly 40 years before Arctic exploration would be recognized, and in 1856 the Arctic Medal was struck and issued retroactively for various polar voyages starting with 1818, the year of Buchan's expedition.

=== Ascension Island ===
After a brief period commanding HMS Espoir, which included successfully interdicting slave ships off the west coast of Africa, Morrell, now a commander, was in 1844 appointed Commandant of Ascension Island, an island in the Atlantic that held strategic value to Britain, due to its proximity to both Africa and South America.

He served as the island's 16th commandant for nearly three years, during which time the Royal Navy continued to engage the slave trade, and would have used the island as a base of operations and victualling stop.

=== Service history ===
- 1801: entered the Royal Navy as a first class volunteer aboard HMS Doris.
- 1803–1804: served on HMS Pique, 36
- 1806: Promoted to master's mate aboard HMS Redbridge, 12
- 1808: Served on board HMS Polyphemus, 64, Captain William Pryce Cumby commanding
- 1809: Confirmed to the rank of lieutenant.
- 1814: Served on board HMS Termagant, Captain John Lampeu Manley commanding
- 1818: Appointed first lieutenant of HMHS Dorothea, under Commander David Buchan
- 1821: First lieutenant aboard HMS Révolutionnaire, 46, Captain Fleetwood Pellew
- 1823–1841: On half-pay
- 1843: Commander of HMS Espoir, 10
- 1844–1847: Commandant of Ascension Island
- 1846: Commander of HMS Hydra
- 1856: Promoted to captain and awarded the Arctic Medal (1818–55) on retirement from the Royal Navy

== Marriage and family ==
In 1820, Morrell married Elizabeth Reid, daughter of the "first pay clerk of wages" at Devonport, William Reid. Morrell was promoted to the rank of commander in 1821, but with peace, much of the Royal Navy was on half-pay. In between periods at sea, it seems that Morrell and Elizabeth lived in or near Devonport. But by 1830, the family had moved to Dinan, in France, where two of his sons were born, George Truman Morrell and another Arthur Morrell, both of whom would also serve in the Royal Navy. Elizabeth later died aged 61, on 29 September 1862, by which time the family had settled in Dartford, Erith, Kent. They had eight children together, of whom six would survive into adulthood.

1. Anna Harriett Cumberland Pellew Morrell
2. Lucy Elizabeth Haynes Morrell, who later married Scottish surgeon and botanist Edward George Irving
3. Charles Walter Morrell
4. Eliza Truman Morrell
5. George Truman Morrell, explorer and later a commander in the Royal Navy
6. Arthur Morrell, later a rear admiral in the Royal Navy
7. Eliza Mary Anne Morrell
8. Isabella Cunard Morrell

Morrell returned to sea service in 1843, on being given command of HMS Espoir.

Government offices
Preceded by John Fraser	Commandant of Ascension Island; 1844–1847	Succeeded by Frederick Hutton
