= Keith Inch Castle =

16th century castle, Aberdeenshire, Scotland

Coordinates: 57.5015°N 1.7714°W

Keith Inch Castle (also known as the Tower of Keith Inch) was a 16th-century L-plan tower house and courtyard, about 1.0 mile (1.6 km) east of Peterhead, Aberdeenshire, Scotland. It stood on Keith Inch, to the north of Peterhead Bay.

An alternative name was Keith Insch Castle.

== History ==
The tower, probably built soon after 1589, belonged to the Keith Earls Marischal. It was extended with artillery fortifications which, in 1715, included seven Spanish cannons.

The castle was occupied by 500 Cromwellian soldiers in 1644 who used it as a base of operations. In 1645 the Covenanter soldiers were ravaged by a plague in Peterhead.

In the Jacobite Rising of 1715, the 10th Earl Marischal George Keith supported the rebellion, with The Old Pretender landing from France in Peterhead. After the Battle of Sherriffmuir lead to the defeat of the rebellion, and the exile of James Stuart, the castle was sacked and looted in the first week of February 1716 by Hanoverian troops who had been tasked with putting down further Jacobite unrest in Peterhead.

It was bought by the Arbuthnotts after 1715. They built a new house, to the north of the tower, and the tower fell into disuse. It was subsequently used as partly as a fish-house and partly as boilyards.

== Structure ==
The castle had four storeys and a garret; the wing was a later addition. The tower itself was round, and the addition, an unadorned house, was on the landward side. It is thought that the castle was modelled on Kronborg Castle in Denmark.

About 1813 the castle was demolished to make way for harbour and other improvements. The last of its remains disappeared in the late 19th century, although, according to Charles McKean, as of the 1990s, "the occasional massive stone wall can be discovered". The structure's past is now recollected only in the name of Castle Street.
