= HMS Hydra (1838) =

Sloop of the Royal Navy

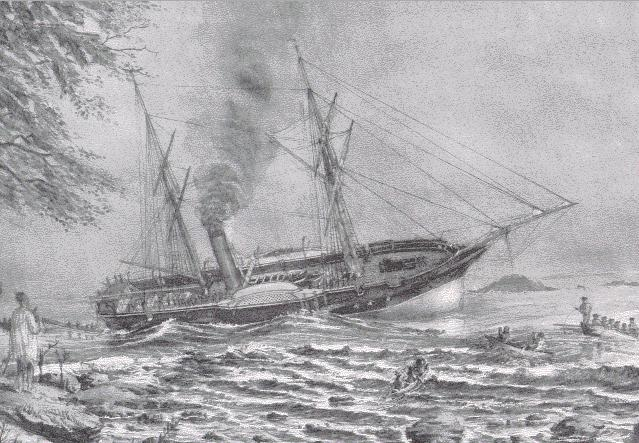
- Hydra's sister-ship, Hecate, aground near Cape Flattery in 1861

History

United Kingdom
- Name: HMS Hydra
- Namesake: Hydra
- Ordered: 18 September 1837
- Builder: Chatham Dockyard
- Cost: £37,239
- Laid down: January 1838
- Launched: 13 June 1838
- Out of service: 13 May 1870
- Fate: Sold for breaking up

General characteristics
- Class & type: Hydra-class sloop
- Displacement: 1,096 long tons (1,114 t)
- Tons burthen: 814 91/94 bm
- Length: 165 ft (50 m) (gundeck); 143 ft 7 1/4 in (43.77 m) (keel)
- Beam: 32 ft 10 in (10.01 m)
- Draught: 13 ft (4.0 m)
- Depth of hold: 20 ft 4 in (6.20 m)
- Installed power: 220 nhp
- Propulsion: Boulton and Watt 2-cylinder side lever steam engine; Iron tubular boilers; Paddles
- Sail plan: Brig rig
- Speed: 9 knots (17 km/h; 10 mph) (under steam)
- Complement: 135
- Armament: 2 × 32-pounder (50 cwt) guns; 2 × 8 in (200 mm) (65 cwt) guns

Service record
- Commanders: Cdr. Anthony W. Milward (1839-40); Cdr. Robert S. Robinson (1840); Cdr. Alexander Murray (1840-42); Cdr. Horatio B. Young (1843-46); Cdr. Arthur F. Morrell (1846-47); Cdr. Grey Skipwith (1847-49); Cdr. Thomas Belgrave (1852); Act.-Cdr. Wm. E. A. Gordon (1852-53); Cdr. Henry G. Morris (1853-56); Cdr. Richard V. Hamilton (1858-62); Cdr. Arthur L. Mansell (1865-66); Capt. Peter F. Shortland (1866-68)
- Operations: Syrian War (1840); Blockade of Africa (1843-49)

HMS Hydra was the lead ship of her class of wooden steam paddle sloops of the British Royal Navy, launched in 1838 at Chatham Dockyard. After taking part in operations during the Syrian War in 1840, she then served on anti-slavery operations and also as a survey vessel. She was scrapped in 1870.

== Ship history ==
Hydra was commissioned on 19 January 1839 under Commander Anthony William Milward to operate in the Mediterranean Sea. After Milward's death in early 1840 Commander Robert Spencer Robinson was appointed to her. Hydra then saw action during the Syrian War, as part of a squadron under the command of Commodore Charles Napier (the ships Powerful, Ganges, Edinburgh, Revenge, Benbow, frigate Pique, and steamer Gorgon) operating off the coast of Ottoman Syria. In Admiral Sir Robert Stopford's report on the Anglo-Austrian-Turkish landings in September 1840 he noted that the steam vessels had been "eminently useful in constantly moving along a great extent of coast with troops and arms, and taking part in the attacks upon the different forts".

From 26 December 1840 until 21 August 1842 she was commanded by Commander Alexander Murray on the North America and West Indies Station.

On 7 August 1843 she was recommissioned at Woolwich by Commander Horatio Beauman Young to take part in the anti-slavery operations of the West Africa Squadron. During this time she captured the following slavers:

- Cyrus, on 6 June 1844.
- Africano (Brazilian), on 30 July 1845.
- Amelia (Brazilian), on 13 September 1846.
- Isabel (Brazilian), on 30 September 1846.

Commander Arthur Fleming Morrell was appointed to command her in November 1846, and further anti-slavery operations followed on the African coast, until she was paid off at Woolwich on 20 April 1847.

From 2 December 1847, under Commander Grey Skipwith she operated off south-east coast of America where she captured the ships:

- Uniao, on 2 March 1849.
- Fidalga, on 14 July 1849.
- Slave vessel, name unknown (possibly Imogene), on 15 October 1849. By 1850 she was at Sheerness.

She then undertook a cruise to the Cape Colony as a survey vessel. Commander Thomas Belgrave was appointed to her on 17 January 1852. From February to April 1852 she surveyed from Sierra Leone to the Cape of Good Hope, and on 28–29 April 1852 while at Simon's Town made a survey from Simon's Bay to Danger Point. On 10 August 1852 Commander Belgrave left the ship owing to ill health, and Lieutenant William Everard Alphonso Gordon from Styx was appointed acting commander, serving until 21 January 1853, when Commander Henry Gage Morris was appointed to her. In July–August 1853 Hydra was surveying between the Comoros Islands and the Cape of Good Hope. She undertook another survey cruise from False Bay at the Cape, to the Comoros Islands and back from 5 January to 3 April 1854. Hydra was paid off on 10 May 1856.

Hydra was recommissioned on 9 June 1858, under Commander Richard Vesey Hamilton, and served on the North America and West Indies Station until 1862. On 10 June 1861, she ran aground in the West Indies. Repairs cost £2,018.

Commander Arthur Lukis Mansell was appointed to command her in January 1865 and she was once again employed as a surveying ship, first in the Ionian Sea, with the resulting Admiralty chart "West Coast of Morea to the Island of Zante" being published in 1867. Captain Peter Frederick Shortland took command in 1866 for her most notable task — a deep-sea cruise in 1867–1868 in the Mediterranean and in the Atlantic Ocean, and a sounding from Aden to Bombay.

== Fate ==
Hydra was paid off in 1868, and was laid up at Sheerness, until sold in 1870.
