= Edward Irving (plant collector) =

Scottish surgeon and plant collector

Edward George Irving (c. 1816–1855) was a Scottish surgeon who served in the Royal Navy. He was also a collector of plants, and the plant family Irvingiaceae, and genus Irvingia are named after him.

== Marriage and Family ==
He married Lucy Elizabeth Haynes Morrell, second daughter of Arthur, a British naval officer and Elizabeth, on 25 July 1848, at Kingston, Portsmouth, Hampshire.

Their children were Edward Arthur Irving, who became an archdeacon in Canada, Minnie Irving, and John Henry Irving.
