= Peterhead Bay =

Bay in Aberdeenshire, Scotland

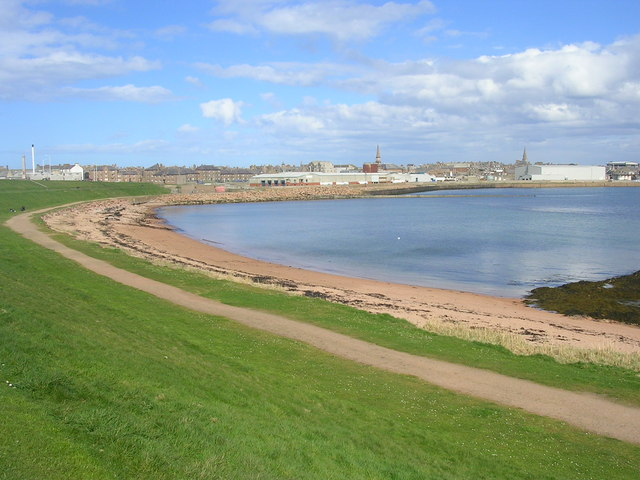
- Peterhead Bay coast showing the town in the distance.

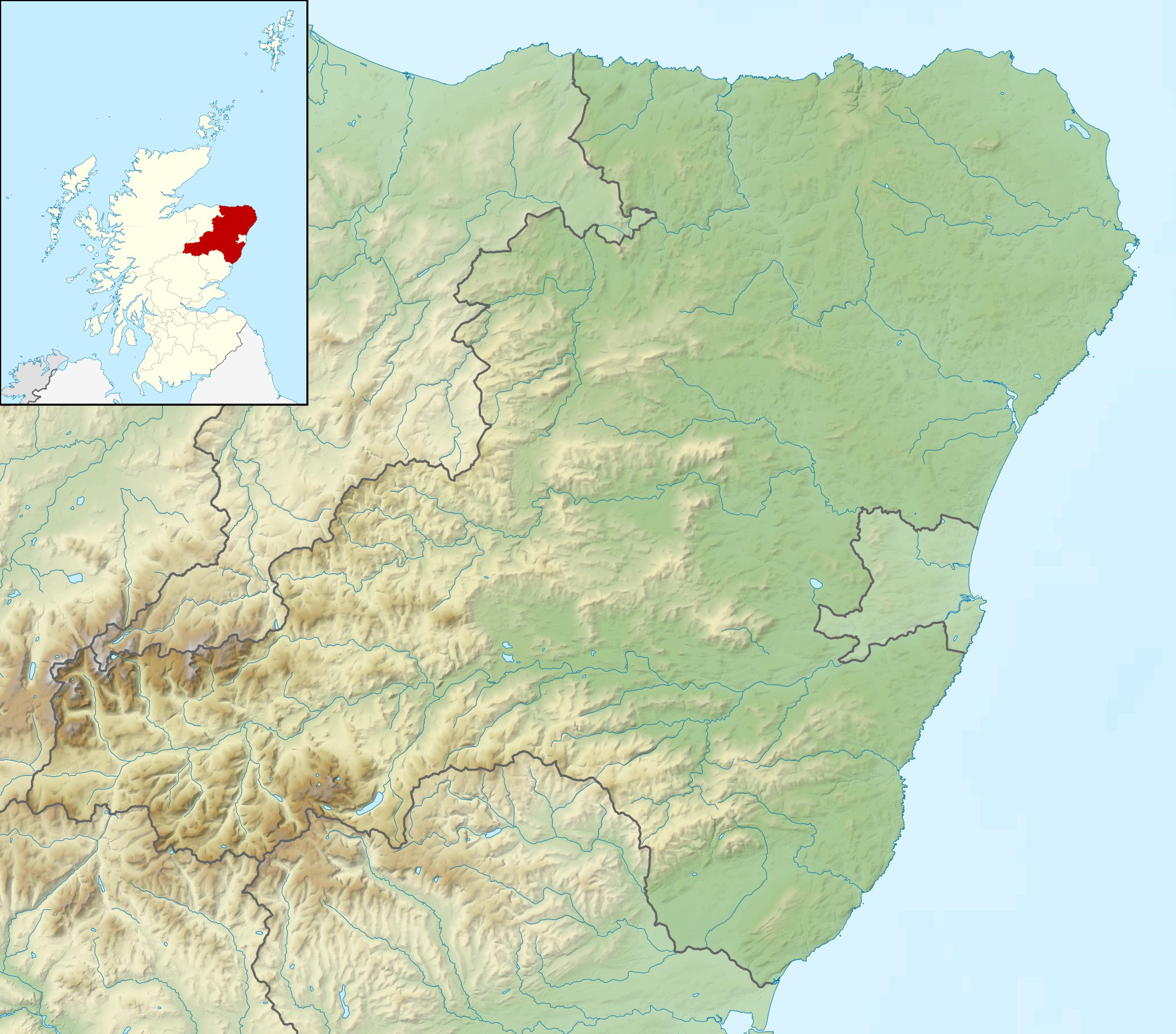
- Location within Aberdeenshire
- Location: Buchan, Aberdeenshire Scotland
- Coordinates: 57°29′57.9660″N 1°46′57.2376″W
- Ocean/sea sources: North Sea
- Basin countries: Scotland
- Max. length: 6.43738 km (4.00000 mi)
- Max. width: 4.82803 km (3.00000 mi)
- Average depth: 20 metres (66 ft)

Peterhead Bay is a large remote industrial tidal 120° facing coastal embayment, located next to the planned community, commercial fishing and ship building town of Peterhead in the Presbytery of Deer, Buchan, Aberdeenshire, and is near the most easternmost point in mainland Scotland. The bay lies to the south of the town, forming a large natural harbour. It was enclosed by breakwaters, to turn the natural harbour into a marina and port, that is now owned by the Port of Peterhead. It was here, on 25 December 1715, that the old pretender, James Francis Edward Stuart, landed and resided at a house at the south end of Longate, owned by Mr James, and being visited by his friends, including George Keith, the Earl Marischal.

== History ==
In 1593, the construction of Peterhead's first harbour, Port Henry basin, began in the bay.

Keith Inch was formerly an island, originally separated from the mainland; it contained the Abbey of Deer. At streamtide, water ran from the north harbour to the south. It carried a fishing village before Peterhead existed. A large amount of soil and rubble was applied to connect the island to the mainland in 1739. A castle stood on the south side of Keith Inch, built in the 16th century by George Earl Marischal. A small fort and guardhouse were also built, and contained 7 brass cannon, which were retrieved from the vessel St Michael of the Spanish Armada which foundered and wrecked on the coast, close to the bay. The Meikle battery, shaped as a half moon, commanded the South harbour, and was stocked with 4 x 12 pound guns and 4 x 18 pound guns and was built around 1780.The Little Battery which was built in 1784 to command the entrance the bay, and occasionally borrowed guns from the larger battery.

In 1773, civil engineer John Smeaton built the south harbour, which was originally called Sackit-hive.

In 1808, civil engineer William Wallace was appointed, on the recommendation of Scottish civil engineer John Rennie to build the north harbour. Rennie had prepared a report in February 1806 on improving the harbour, including alterations to the existing south harbour, creation of a new dock and north harbour. The report was endorsed by Thomas Telford. Wallace's task was to deepen the harbour, create a quay wall on the west pier and use any waste material to create a new embankment. More than 39000 cubic yards were removed from the harbour, much from solid rock. The harbour was deepened by 6 feet and a 500 feet embankment formed. Under Wallace's supervision, the main contract was completed in March 1812. £13,000 had been spent, on the contract of works, £6,000 more on the original estimate.

On 11 October 2010, construction began on a new deep water harbour, in a £33.5 million pound project, called Smith Quay In November 2015, a £49 million pound project was undertaken to build a new large state of the art fish market and inner harbour reconstruction.

== Piracy ==
During the 17th and 18th centuries, both shipping in the harbour and the town of Peterhead itself, were prone to attacks by pirates.

At the beginning of King William's War in 1688, a French privateer of 24 guns, opened fire on the harbour and town, causing considerable damage to the town and harbour, including blowing off the pocket of a woman from her side, while she was standing in her own shop door. The privateer plundered the town of sheep and cattle. A lack of gunpowder in the town at the time, meant that only two cannon in the fort were loaded to ensure the privateer did not land in the town.

Later a privateer followed a vessel belonging to Borrowstouness (Bo'ness), which had to run to shore in the bay. After being assisted by the people of Peterhead by using small arms fire, the privateer was forced to withdraw. A similar incident occurred later, when an English ship from the Virginia (Virginia) was chased into the harbour, and the towns people and the fort batteries were utilised to force it to withdraw. A later attack occurred when two privateers, shott [lowered] their longboats with an intent to sack the town, but the fort's 18-pounders were used to drive them off. A Leith ship heading to Norway took refuge in the bay, when another privateer attacked them. The 18-pounders were used so effectively, that the privateer had to tack to escape. McKenzie, the master of a ship from Inverness, was chased by a privateer into the North Bay when the 18-pounders were again brought into use to drive the privateer about.

At another time, Captain Alex Taylor of Bo'ness arrived in the bay, and was attacked from the sea in the 1780s, by a notorious English pirate and privateer, Daniel Fall, who had been plaguing the bay for some time. Two guns from the south battery were fired upon her, which forced the privateer to withdraw, outside the range of the guns. During the night, the privateer shott her longboat, with a design to attack ship in the harbour. The longboat came close to the harbour, attacking the guard upon the pier head, with small arms fire returned so briskly, that forced the longboat to withdraw. The next day, the privateer still continued to anchor at the other side of the bay. The townspeople decided to load their biggest 18-pounder gun with an extraordinary charge of powder and fired on the ship, forcing her to withdraw with some damage, which was attested by one Patrick Cruickshank, a Peterhead man, who was being ransomed aboard the vessel at the time.

In 1704, when Admiral Baron de Pointis (Admiral Ponti in the vernacular) attacked and burnt Dutch vessels up the east coast, at least 100 vessels were protected in the bay and the guns of the Fort. Scarcely a week passed during King William's War or Queen Anne's War when ships were saved by fleeing to the bay.

== Ship building ==
Shipbuilding in Peterhead Bay has been undertaken since the early 17th century. Vessels were built for the Western India, American, Baltic and the Mediterranean trade. Associated industries such as rope and nail makers were present in Peterhead to support the shipbuilding industries. In the 17th century, most shipping built, was for Greenland whale fishing. A typical whaling ship would be fitted out at a cost between £8000-£10000, each with between six and seven boats with six men in each, with lances and ropes for catching the whale. Vessels were built for common fishing for cod, and other fishing around Barra Head, and off the coast of Norway and Spain. Ships were later built for export of fish, butter, cheese, grain, and non-consumables such as granite. Imports included coal and iron.

== Whaling and fishing ==
In its earliest days, in the mid-16th century, the island Keith Inch in the bay, was a rendezvous for Dutch fisherman, who traveled the bay to catch Cod and Ling.

The whaling years at Peterhead Bay, were between 1788 and 1893. By 1840, Peterhead harbour was the major whaling port of the Britain with over half the whaling fleet sailing from the bay. David Gray Jr, who was part of a well known Peterhead whaling family, was the most successful captain of Peterhead's whaling fleet, starting work at the age of 14, with a trip to Greenlands whaling grounds. During 43 seasons of whaling, he captured 197 whales and 168,000 seals, becoming known as the Prince of Whalers. Gray was a keen amateur zoologist who made some important contributions to Arctic biology, giving an account of whale behaviour and history that were reported by the Zoological Society of London. He also made some anatomical diagrams. Gray estimated that Peterhead whalers had killed 4,195 whales between 1788 and 1879.

Peterhead harbour now operates a large whitefish fishery fleet and is the largest whitefish port in Britain.

== Oil ==
Peterhead bay and harbour became a major oil and gas port that began servicing the offshore oil and gas industry in 1973, principally because of the deep water harbour and the short steaming time to the oil fields. It was found out that the Scottish Secretary of State had responsibility for the harbour, in an 1886 act, that prohibited development in the harbour, except as a Haven of Refuge. A bill was introduced in May 1972 permitting other uses. The Scottish Office and Sidlaw Industries, an Aberdeen company made an agreement to lease the harbour quay, and dredging began in January 1972, to increase the depth of the harbour areas. By 1973, a large investment was made to improve the harbour facilities and to facilitate the building of a gas and oil terminal. Oil and gas from the North Sea flow through Peterhead Bay.

== Geography ==
Immediately south of the bay is Sandford Bay. On the North Harbour lies the former island of Keith Inch where the north breakwater is anchored. Further north of the bay is the South Head rocks, forming the east most promontory. From that point on, the land curves in a north by north west direction to the North Head rock promontory. The small Almanythie Creek flows into the North Sea at that point.

== Marina and harbour ==
The port consists of two areas, which are Peterhead Bay Harbour and the Harbours of Peterhead. Peterhead Bay Harbour comprises the deep water inlet, and is specifically used for the oil and gas industry. The Harbours of Peterhead service the fishing industry and bulk cargo industries.

The harbour has two massive breakwaters, enclosing an area of approximately 300 acres in Peterhead bay. The south breakwater, about 2700 ft long, was constructed in 1892–1912 using convict labour from the prison at HM Prison Peterhead. The north breakwater, constructed 1912–56, is approximately 1500 ft long. The north breakwater is built of granite which is 18 metres wide and 14 metres deep. Vessels up to 96,000 tonnes have been accommodated on the breakwater.

The following are the different areas that are part of the harbour facilities within Peterhead Bay:

Port and Harbour Area's	Comments
Smith Embankment	The Smith embankment which became the Smith Quay' is a large, deep-water berth which was added to the North harbour to large, deep-drafted vessels that need to offload/onload large amounts of cargo for subsea, renewable energy, fabrication and project cargo. The berth is 200 metres in length with a quay height of 6.2 metres above chart datum with a 500-tonne lift crane.
South Base	This base designed to ensure the quick turnaround of vessels for the North Sea oil and gas industry. It is use by oil platform support and anchor handling vessels, tankers and bulk carriers.
North Base	The North Base has the breakwater and the North Base Jetty. The jetty is an open pile concrete jetty offering two berths, one at each side. The jetty was modernised in 2003 as it constituted the oldest part of the harbour.
Tanker Jetty	The tanker jetty was designed to deliver fuel to Peterhead Power Station. The jetty is big enough to berth tankers up to 50,000 tonnes, of under 280 metres in length. The jetty is also used for the repair of vessels.
Princess Royal Jetty	This jetty was designed to service ships for the oil and gas industry. It has three berths. Berth 2 and 3 are 170 metres in length. Berth 1 is 90 metres in length.
Peterhead Bay Marina	Peterhead marina, is located in the south west corner, next to the South Bay harbour. Peterhead marina is a purpose-built leisure facilities, which enable vessels up to 22 metres to berth. The water in the marina is 2.3 metres below chart datum and enables vessels with up to a 2.8 draft.
Albert Quay	Albert Quay has very deep water and used for handling project cargo and supporting diving support vessels.
Merchant Quay	The Merchant Quay is where the Peterhead Bay whitefish fishery fleet operates from. Peterhead harbour is the largest whitefish port in Britain.

== Settlements ==
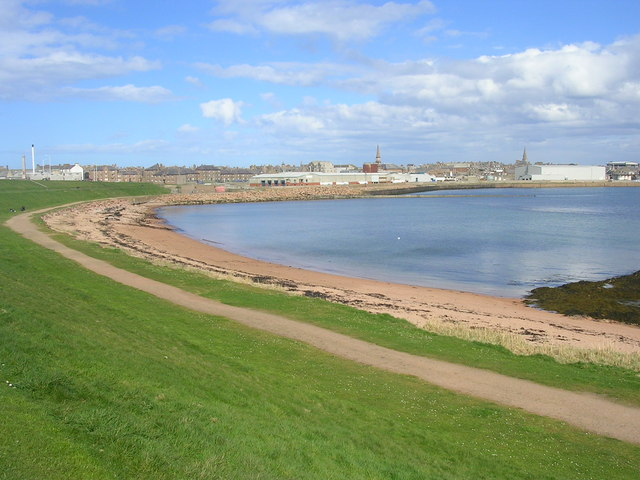
Peterhead Bay

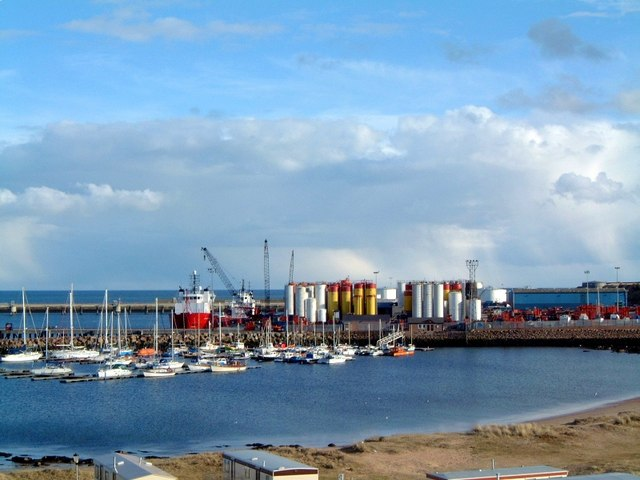
Peterhead Bay. In the background the breakwater built by convict labour. In the middle distance silos of drilling mud for the offshore oil industry and yachts berthed in the Peterhead marina. In the foreground the roofs of holiday caravans and the "Lido" sands.

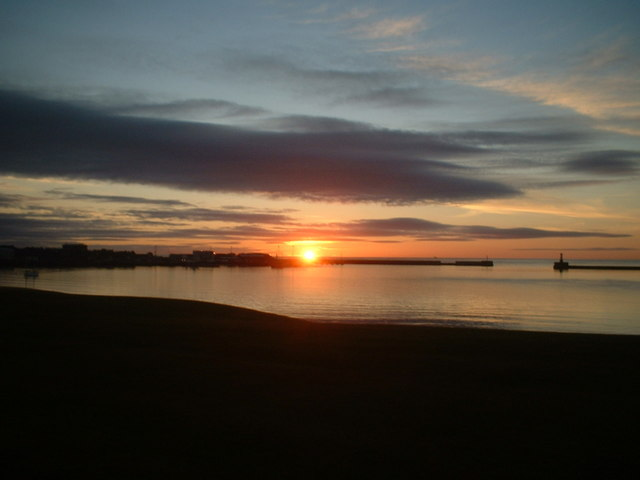
Peterhead Bay. 0630, calm summer's morning. (L-R) 'downtown – harbour – north breakwater – south breakwater. foreground – above the Lido.

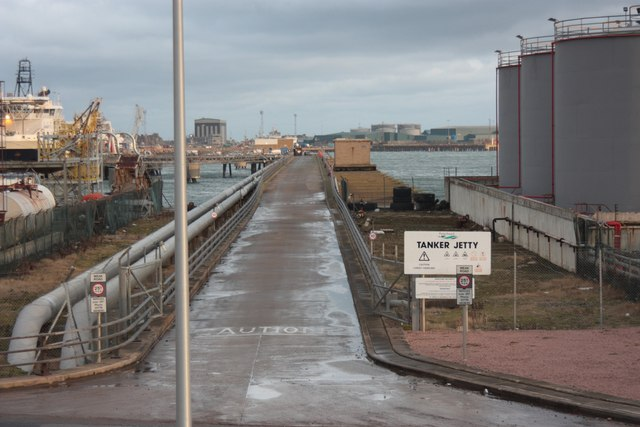
Jetty at Peterhead Bay

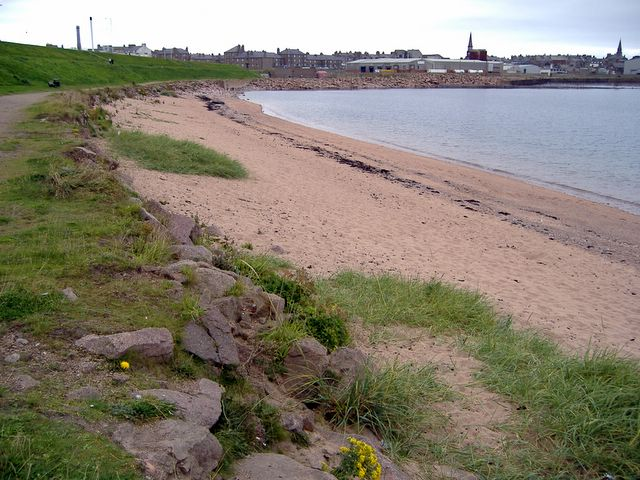
Peterhead Bay, shoreline A popular dog walking/exercising area.

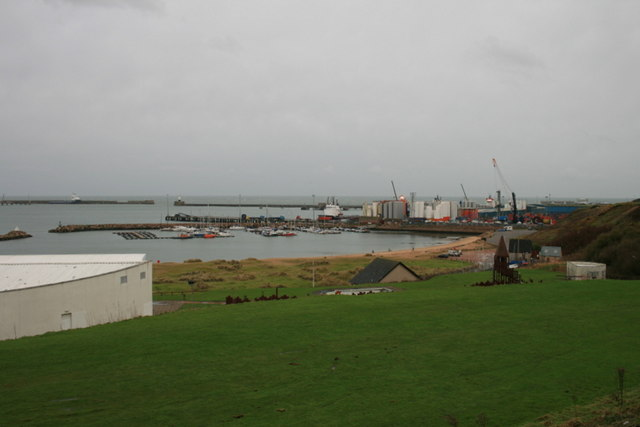
The marina on the south shore of Peterhead Bay.

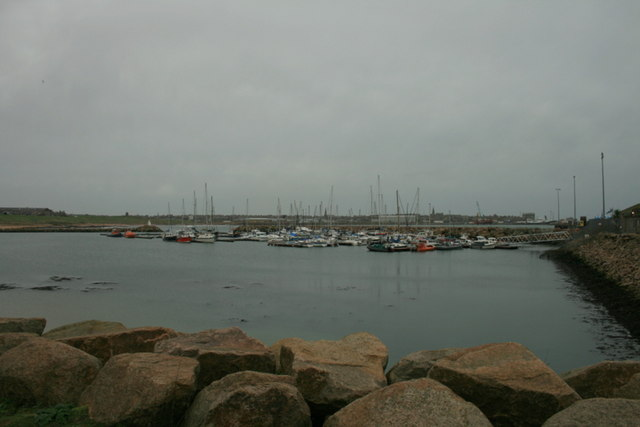
Peterhead Bay marina and jetty facility.

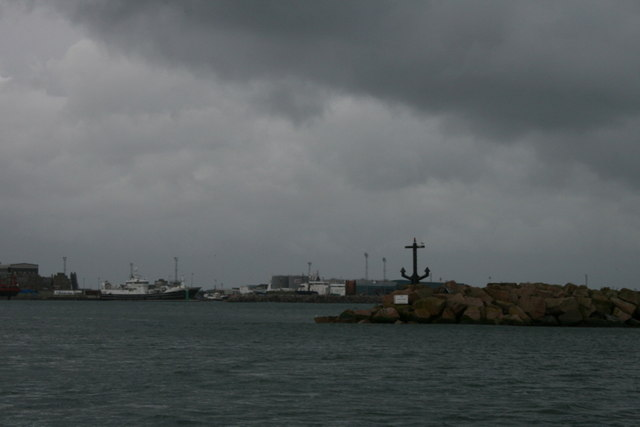
Leaving the marina and entering Peterhead Bay.

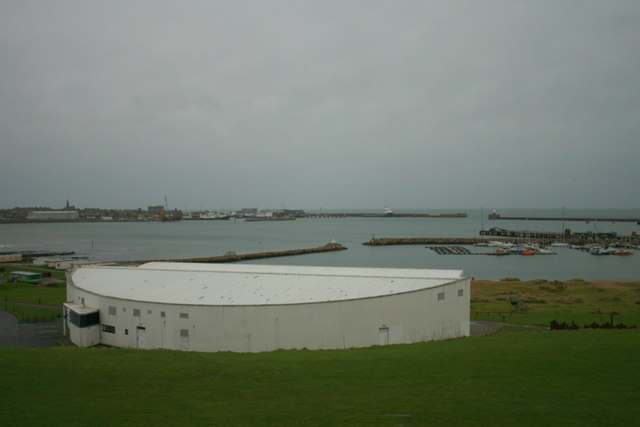
The Heritage Centre overlooking Peterhead Bay.

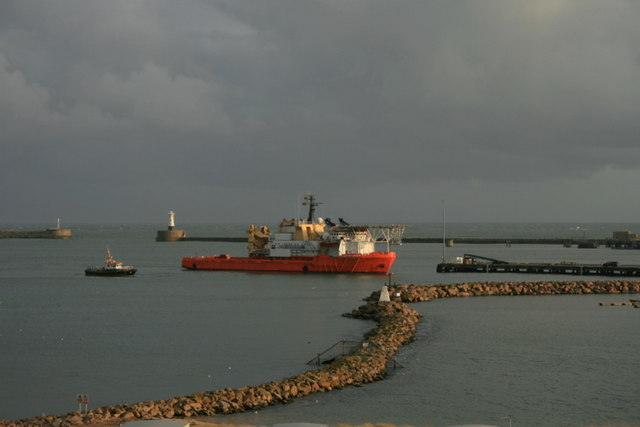
A ship bound for the cement works in Peterhead Bay.

== General references ==
- "History of Peterhead". National Trust for Scotland A Place for Everyone. The National Trust for Scotland. Archived from the original on 25 September 2015.
