= Digby Mackworth Dolben =

English poet (1848–1867)

Digby Mackworth Dolben

Digby Augustus Stewart Mackworth Dolben (8 February 1848 – 28 June 1867) was an English poet who died young from drowning. He owes his poetic reputation to his cousin, Robert Bridges, poet laureate from 1913 to 1930, who edited a partial edition of his verse, Poems, in 1911.

He was born in Guernsey, and brought up at Finedon Hall in Northamptonshire. His father, William Harcourt Isham Mackworth (1806–1872), a younger son of Sir Digby Mackworth, the 3rd Baronet, took the additional surname Dolben after he married Frances, the heiress of Sir John English Dolben, the 4th Baronet.

He was educated at Cheam School and Eton College, studying under the influential Master William Johnson Cory whose principles of pedagogy and collection of verses Ionica inspired his own poetry. At Eton, his distant cousin Bridges was his senior and took him under his wing.

Dolben caused considerable scandal at school by his behaviour. He marked his romantic attachment to another pupil a year older than he was, Martin Le Marchant Gosselin, by writing love poetry. He also defied his strict Protestant upbringing by joining a High Church Puseyite group of pupils. He then claimed allegiance to the Order of St Benedict, affecting a monk's habit. He was considering a conversion to Roman Catholicism.

In 1865 on his seventeenth birthday, he was introduced by Bridges, by then an undergraduate at Corpus Christi College, Oxford, to Gerard Manley Hopkins who was at Balliol. According to the account given by his biographer Norman White, this encounter greatly perturbed Hopkins.

Hopkins's biographer Robert Bernard Martin asserts that Hopkins's meeting with Dolben, "was, quite simply, the most momentous emotional event of [his] undergraduate years, probably of his entire life". He writes:

Hopkins was completely taken with Dolben, who was nearly four years his junior, and his private journal for confessions the following year proves how absorbed he was in imperfectly suppressed erotic thoughts of him.

Hopkins kept up a correspondence with Dolben, wrote about him in his diary and composed two poems about the youth, "Where art thou friend" and "The Beginning of the End." Hopkins's High Anglican confessor seems to have forbidden him to have any contact with Dolben except by letter. Dolben's death greatly affected Hopkins, although his feeling for Dolben seems to have cooled by that time.

Dolben drowned in the River Welland when bathing with the ten-year-old son of his tutor, Rev. C. E. Prichard, Rector of South Luffenham in Rutland. Dolben was then aged 19 and preparing to go up to Oxford.

Bridges guaranteed Dolben's reputation with Three Friends: Memoirs of Digby Mackworth Dolben, Richard Watson Dixon, Henry Bradley (1932), as well as the careful editing of his poetry. Subsequently, The Poems and Letters of Digby Mackworth Dolben 1848–1867 (1981) has given a less selective picture.

Hopkins' infatuation for Dolben and Dolben's tragic death feature in Simon Edge's novel The Hopkins Conundrum (2017).

== Bibliography ==
- Norman White, Hopkins: A Literary Biography, OUP (1992).
