= HMS Phoenix (1832) =

Sloop of the Royal Navy

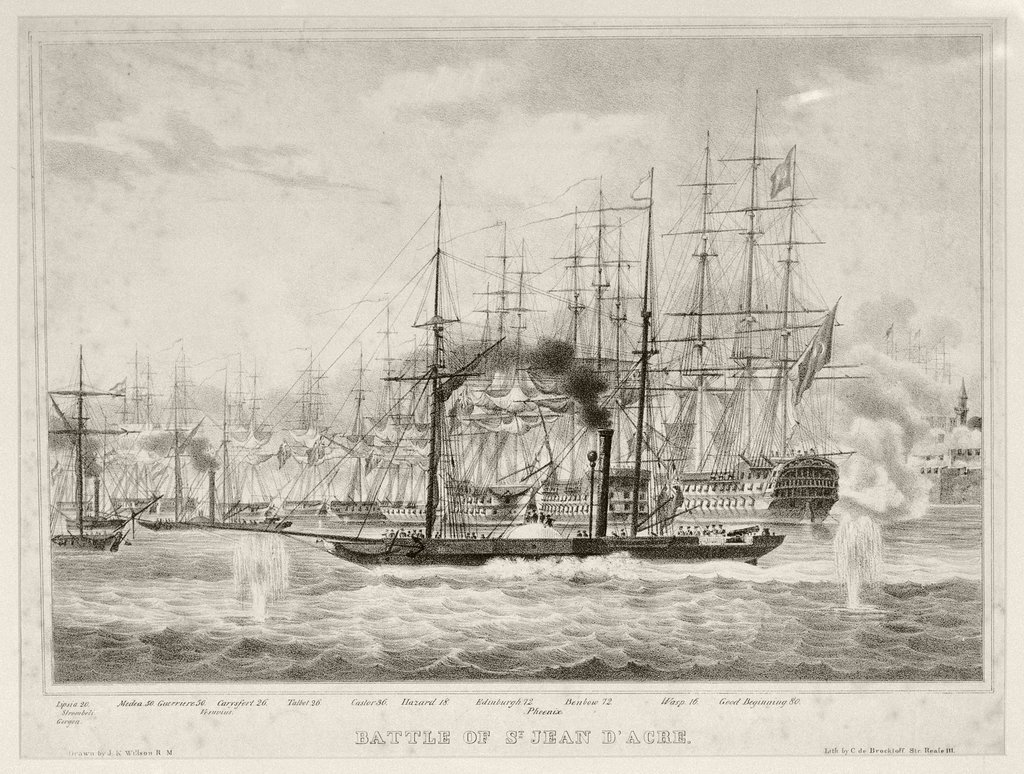
- HMS Phoenix at the Bombardment of Acre

History

United Kingdom
- Name: HMS Phoenix
- Ordered: 12 January 1831
- Builder: Devonport Dockyard
- Laid down: May 1831
- Launched: 25 September 1832
- Commissioned: 7 January 1834
- Fate: Sold for breaking on 26 January 1864

General characteristics As paddle sloop (1832 - 1844)
- Class & type: Steam vessel; (later second-class sloop)
- Tons burthen: 812 bm
- Length: 174 ft 7 in (53.2 m)
- Beam: 31 ft 10 in (9.7 m)
- Draught: 12 ft 6 in (3.8 m)
- Depth of hold: 16 ft 9 in (5.1 m)
- Installed power: 220 nhp, 2-cyl. side lever steam engine
- Propulsion: Sidewheels
- Complement: 135
- Armament: 10-inch (84cwt) pivot-mounted gun; 8-inch (52cwt) pivot-mounted gun; 4 × 32-pdr (17cwt) carronades
- Notes: Converted to a screw sloop at Deptford, from 1844 to 1845

General characteristics As screw sloop (1845 - 1864)
- Class & type: Screw sloop; (later corvette)
- Tons burthen: 809 bm
- Length: 174 ft 7 in (53.2 m)
- Beam: 31 ft 10 in (9.7 m)
- Depth of hold: 12 ft 3 in (3.7 m)
- Installed power: 1 × 260 nhp, 489 ihp (365 kW), 2-cyl. vertical steam engine; tubular boilers
- Propulsion: Single screw
- Speed: 8.8 kn (16.3 km/h)
- Complement: 135
- Armament: 10-inch (84cwt) pivot-mounted gun; 8-inch (52cwt) pivot-mounted gun; 8 × 32-pdr (17cwt) carronades
- Notes: Fitted for Arctic service in 1851

HMS Phoenix was a 6-gun steam paddle vessel of the Royal Navy, built in a dry dock at Chatham in 1832. She was reclassified as a second-class paddle sloop before being rebuilt as a 10-gun screw sloop in 1844–45. She was fitted as an Arctic storeship in 1851 and sold for breaking in 1864.

== Design ==
The vessel was designed by Robert Seppings, and built in a drydock at Chatham Dockyard. She was engined by Maudslay, Sons and Field with a two-cylinder side lever steam engine developing 220 nominal horsepower. She was armed with a single 10-inch (84cwt) pivot-mounted gun, an 8-inch (52cwt) pivot-mounted gun and four 32-pounder (17cwt) carronades.

On 22 March 1831, before the keel was laid down, the ship was renamed Charon, but the name Phoenix was restored less than a fortnight later.

== Service as a paddle sloop ==
The Phoenix was commissioned on 6 November 1833 under Commander Robert Oliver, for the Channel Fleet. From 9 September 1835 to June 1838 she was commanded by Commander William Honyman Henderson, including service off coast of Spain during the First Carlist War. Captain Lord John Hay commanded her on the same duty from 19 November 1836 to 1838. From July 1838 she was under Commander Anthony W. Milward and from 1839 she spent her life in the Mediterranean, first under Commander Robert Spencer Robinson from 20 July 1839, and then, from 1 March 1840, under Commander Robert Fanshawe Stopford. Stopford was in command when she took part in the Bombardment of Acre on 3 November 1840. Subsequently, she was commanded from 26 December 1840 by Commander John Richardson until she paid off on 1 January 1842.

== Conversion to screw sloop ==
In April 1844 Phoenix was converted to a screw sloop by Curling & Young's at Limehouse to a design by Oliver Lang. She received a John Penn & Son 260-nominal horsepower two-cylinder vertical single-expansion steam engine driving a screw propeller. The conversion was finished by February 1845, and the 489 indicated horsepower (365 kW) developed by her new engine, combined with the more efficient screw propulsion, gave her a speed under steam of about 8.8 knots (16.3 km/h). A further benefit of screw propulsion was the loss of the large paddle boxes, which allowed more of her deck to be used for guns; a further four carronades were fitted, making her a 10-gun ship. She was re-docked at Deptford on 1 April 1844 to be fitted with "Mr Steinman's patent submarine propeller".

The conversion from paddle propulsion to screw propulsion in 1843 cost £18,663. The redundant paddle engine from Phoenix was re-used in 1844 in HMS Firefly.

== Service as a screw sloop ==
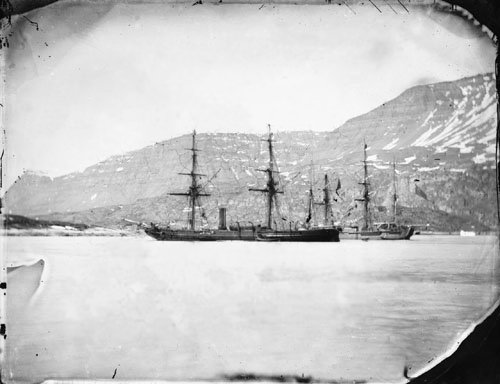
Phoenix together with HMS Diligence at Qeqertarsuaq in Greenland, in 1854

Between 1845 and 1847 she served on the Home Station and then the Mediterranean Station under the command of Commander James Dennis. On 6 February 1846 she was docked at Woolwich to have a false keel fitted to reduce her excessive rolling motion. From 1849 Commander George Wodehouse took her to the West coast of Africa, and she served there under Commander Thomas Lysaght from 1850 until she paid off on 15 August 1851.

Fitted for Arctic service, she commissioned at Deptford under Captain Edward Inglefield in February 1853 with experienced Arctic captain Donald Manson as ice-master, and was used to supply Sir Edward Belcher's expedition at Beechey Island. Inglefield carried the news of the discovery of the Northwest Passage by Robert McClure back to England in October 1853. Inglefield remained in command when she recommissioned at Woolwich on 21 February 1854, and she returned to Beechey Island to re-supply Belcher. Inglefield brought home the ship's company of HMS Investigator, which had become trapped in the ice.

As an Arctic storeship, she was ideal for employment in the Russian Arctic during the Russian War of 1853–1856. She was commanded by Captain John Hayes, including service in the White Sea, from 10 February 1855 until she paid off at Sheerness.

== Fate ==
On 26 January 1864 Phoenix was sold to Castle for breaking up at Charlton.
