= Keith Inch =

Easternmost point of mainland Scotland, Aberdeenshire

Keith Inch Keith Insche (Scottish Gaelic)
- Headland
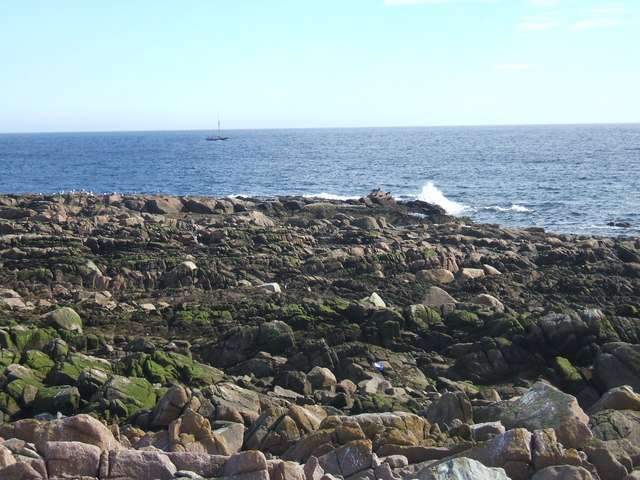
- Shore at Keith Inch

- Location within Scotland
- Coordinates: 57°30′10″N 01°45′51″W
- Grid position: NK 14232 45865
- Location: Peterhead, Aberdeenshire, Scotland

Keith Inch (originally Keith Insche, Keithinche or Caikinche) is the easternmost point of mainland Scotland, having formerly been an island. It is located in Peterhead in Aberdeenshire, forming the north point of Peterhead Bay. It is now joined to Greenhill, another former island, previously separated from Keith Inch by the Poolmouth. Greenhill Road leads the motorist onto Greenhill from the town via Alexandra Parade.

It forms part of Peterhead Harbour. Inch is a common Scottish word for an island, such as Inchcolm, Inchkenneth and na h-Innse Gall (Hebrides), and derives from the Scottish Gaelic innis.

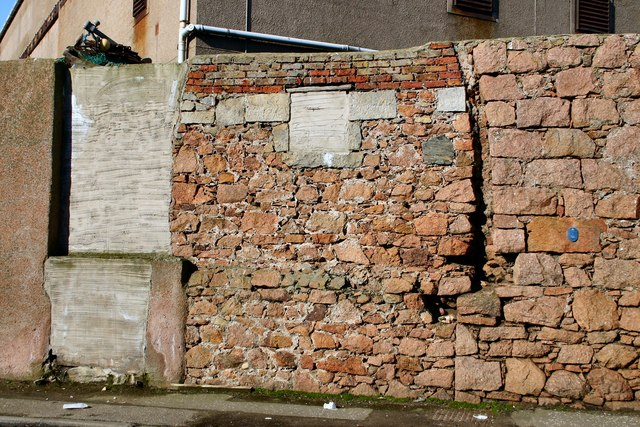
Remains of the whale bone arch in Peterhead Harbour

It was used in the whaling industry, and boil yards were here; the remains of a whale bone arch can be seen.

== Castle of Keith Inch ==
On the island of Keith Inch once stood a castle built by George Keith, 5th Earl Marischal, in the late 16th century. The castle is thought to have been modelled on the castle of Kronborg in Denmark. In 1644 about 500 of Oliver Cromwell's English soldiers rampaged in the Peterhead area. They were encamped on Keith Inch, with their headquarters in the castle.

After 1715, it was purchased by Thomas Arbuthnot, who built a modern house to the north of the island. When it was abandoned, it was converted into partly a fish-house and partly into boil yards. The final complete vestiges were removed in the late 19th century, although an occasional "massive" stone wall can be found.

== See also ==
- Dunnet Head – Scotland's most northerly point on the mainland
- Mull of Galloway – Scotland's most southerly point
- Corrachadh Mòr – Scotland's most westerly point on the mainland
- List of extreme points of the United Kingdom
