= Maud Junction railway station =

Disused railway station in Maud, Aberdeenshire

Maud
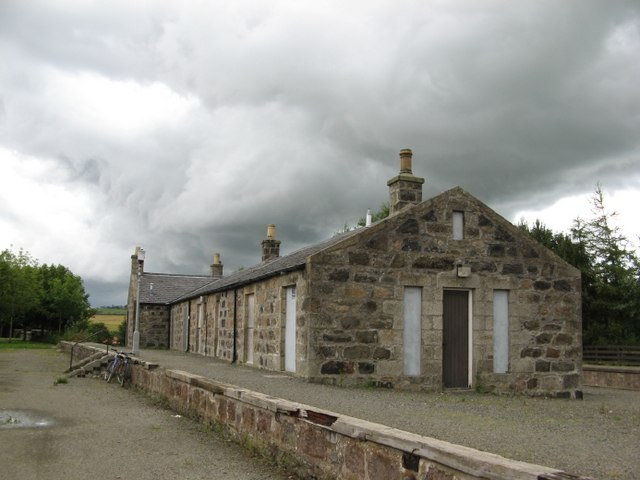
- The station in 2007

General information
- Location: Maud, Aberdeenshire; Scotland
- Coordinates: 57.5210°N 2.1256°W

Other information
- Status: Disused

Key dates
- 18 July 1861: Opened as New Maud Junction
- 1866: Renamed Maud Junction
- 1925: Renamed Maud
- 1965: Closed for passengers
- 1979: Closed for freight
Location

Maud Junction railway station was a railway station in Maud, Aberdeenshire, Scotland. It was a junction where the line north from Aberdeen split into two routes to the coastal town stations of Peterhead and Fraserburgh, both of which are now closed.

== History ==
The 29 miles (47 km) long railway from Dyce to Mintlaw opened on 18 July 1861, with the extension to Peterhead opening the following year. The final section north to Fraserburgh opened in 1865. Dyce was on the Great North of Scotland Railway north from Aberdeen Waterloo station. The line was built by the Formartine and Buchan Railway Company, which became part of the GNSR in 1866. In 1923, the GNSR was incorporated into the London and North Eastern Railway, which was in turn nationalised on 1 January 1948. Passenger services on the Buchan lines were withdrawn in 1965 as part of the Beeching cuts. Freight trains continued to operate to Peterhead until 1970 and to Fraserburgh until 1979. The track through Maud station was subsequently lifted.

Maud Junction was a major railhead for N. E. Scotland cattle transport. An auction mart in the village was the source of Aberdeenshire beef cattle for transport to all parts of Great Britain. On market days special arrangements were made to accommodate heavy cattle traffic on the single track line to Dyce given the shortage of sidings at Maud.

There was no engine shed at Maud, even though it had a turntable. Each morning a locomotive came down from Fraserburgh to collect the Fraserburgh coaches from the first train from Aberdeen which then proceeded to Peterhead. The last engine at night went back "light engine" to the Fraserburgh shed.

== Current status ==
Today, the station building houses the small Maud Railway Museum and some vacant business units. The museum can be opened by special request to Aberdeenshire Council. Great North of Scotland Railway Association volunteers open the museum on selected weekends most years. The station site is open to be explored and has been mainly preserved but the track is lifted. The remains of the turntable can be seen, along with the cattle loading platforms.

The Formartine and Buchan Way long-distance footpath follows the line of the old track.

Former services

Preceding station	Historical railways	Following station
Auchnagatt	Great North of Scotland Railway; Formartine and Buchan Railway; Fraserburgh Line	Brucklay
Auchnagatt	Great North of Scotland Railway; Formartine and Buchan Railway; Peterhead Line	Abbey of Deer Platform
