= Mintlaw Academy =

Location
- Station Road; Mintlaw; Aberdeenshire, AB42 5FN; Scotland; 57.524789°N 2.013193°W

Information
- Type: State comprehensive
- Motto: Learning together
- Established: 1981
- Local authority: Aberdeenshire Council
- Head Teacher: Sharon Noble
- Staff: 69.9 wte
- Years: S1-S6
- Gender: Co-educational
- Age: 11 to 18
- Enrolment: 858
- Houses: 4
- Website: http://www.mintlawacademy.aberdeenshire.sch.uk

Mintlaw Academy is a secondary school in Aberdeenshire, Scotland.

== History ==
The school opened in 1981 with about 600 enrolled students and a capacity of 1,000. By August 2003, it had about 920 enrolled students. The rector is Sharon Noble, who started as full time headteacher in August 2025 . The school serves the rural communities of Central Buchan and draws pupils from the villages of Mintlaw, Fetterangus, Longside, Maud, New Deer, New Pitsligo, Strichen, Auchnagatt, Stuartfield and the surrounding area.

At Mintlaw Academy there are four houses. Brucklay (named after Brucklay estate between Maud and New Deer), Deer (named after Deer Abbey a few miles from the school), Mormond (named after Mormond Hill near Strichen) and Ugie (named after the river Ugie flowing past Mintlaw). There used to be another house, Aden, (named after Aden Country Park) though this house was stopped due to a falling roll at the end of the 2008–2009 school year.

== Community School Network ==
In addition to Mintlaw Academy, the Mintlaw Community School Network consists of Auchnagatt Primary School, Fetterangus Primary School, Kininmonth Primary School, Longside Primary School, Maud Primary School, Mintlaw Primary School, New Deer Primary School, New Pitsligo & St John's School, Pitfour Primary School, Strichen Primary School and Stuartfield Primary School.

== Former pupils ==
- Kim Little – international footballer
- Nikki Kidd – international field hockey player
