= New Leeds =

Coordinates: 57.582°N 2.008°W

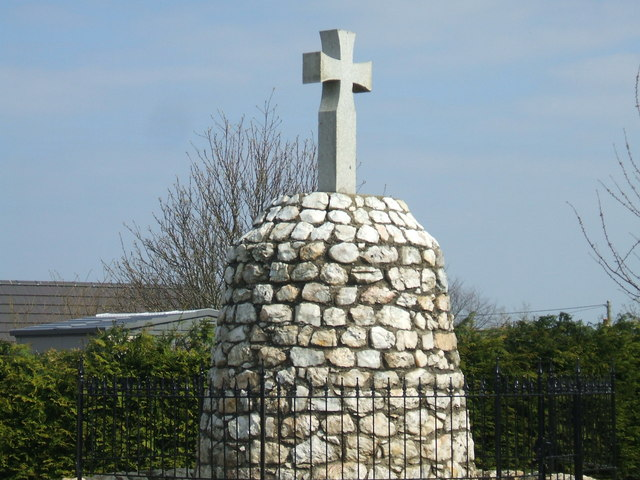
- War Memorial at New Leeds

- Location within Aberdeenshire
- OS grid reference: NJ996546
- Council area: Aberdeenshire
- Lieutenancy area: Aberdeenshire
- Country: Scotland
- Sovereign state: United Kingdom
- Post town: PETERHEAD
- Postcode district: AB42
- Dialling code: 01346 (Lonmay)
- Police: Scotland
- Fire: Scottish
- Ambulance: Scottish
- UK Parliament: Aberdeenshire North and Moray East
- Scottish Parliament: Aberdeenshire East

New Leeds is a planned village in the Buchan area of Aberdeenshire, Scotland, situated 5.1 kilometres (3.2 mi) east of Strichen at the foot of Mormond Hill.

Nowadays New Leeds serves chiefly as a dormitory village for Aberdeen and Fraserburgh.

== Transport ==
Regular bus services operate to Fraserburgh and Aberdeen, and an on-demand Dial-a-bus service is also available.

New Leeds is adjacent to the A952 road, which links with the A90 road north to Fraserburgh and south to Aberdeen and beyond.

The nearby Mormond railway station closed in 1979, and now offers an access point to the Formartine and Buchan Way, the long-distance path that follows the route of the former railway.

== Landmarks ==
On the slopes of Mormond Hill above the village is the White Stag of Mormond, a hill figure marked with quartz stones, first laid out by Mr F. W. Cordiner of Cortes to mark his wedding in 1870.

A more modern landmark is the pair of wind turbines erected in 2008 at Redbog, 1 kilometre (0.62 mi) north of the village. A further turbine at nearby West Cockmuir is planned.

== Schools ==
Primary education is provided at Kininmonth School, 1.9 kilometres (1.2 mi) south of the village, whilst secondary pupils travel to Mintlaw Academy, 6.4 kilometres (4.0 mi) away.

== Churches ==
New Leeds Church was built between 1853 and 1854, and is located in the south-west end of the village. The church and attached manse have been converted into a private house.

== History ==
New Leeds was founded in the late 18th century by Alexander Fraser 8th of Strichen (fl. 1764), whose ambition was that the village would grow to rival Leeds in Yorkshire as a place of wool manufacture. Such ambitions were not to be realised, and by 1912 the village was suffering declining population, with many dwellings abandoned.

Burnshangie Farm dates to 1800, while nearby Howford Old Farm followed a little later.

== Bibliography ==
- McKean, Charles (1990), Banff & Buchan, Royal Incorporation of Architects in Scotland, ISBN 978-1-85158-231-0
