= Mintlaw =

Village in Aberdeenshire, Scotland

Coordinates: 57.525°N 2.001°W

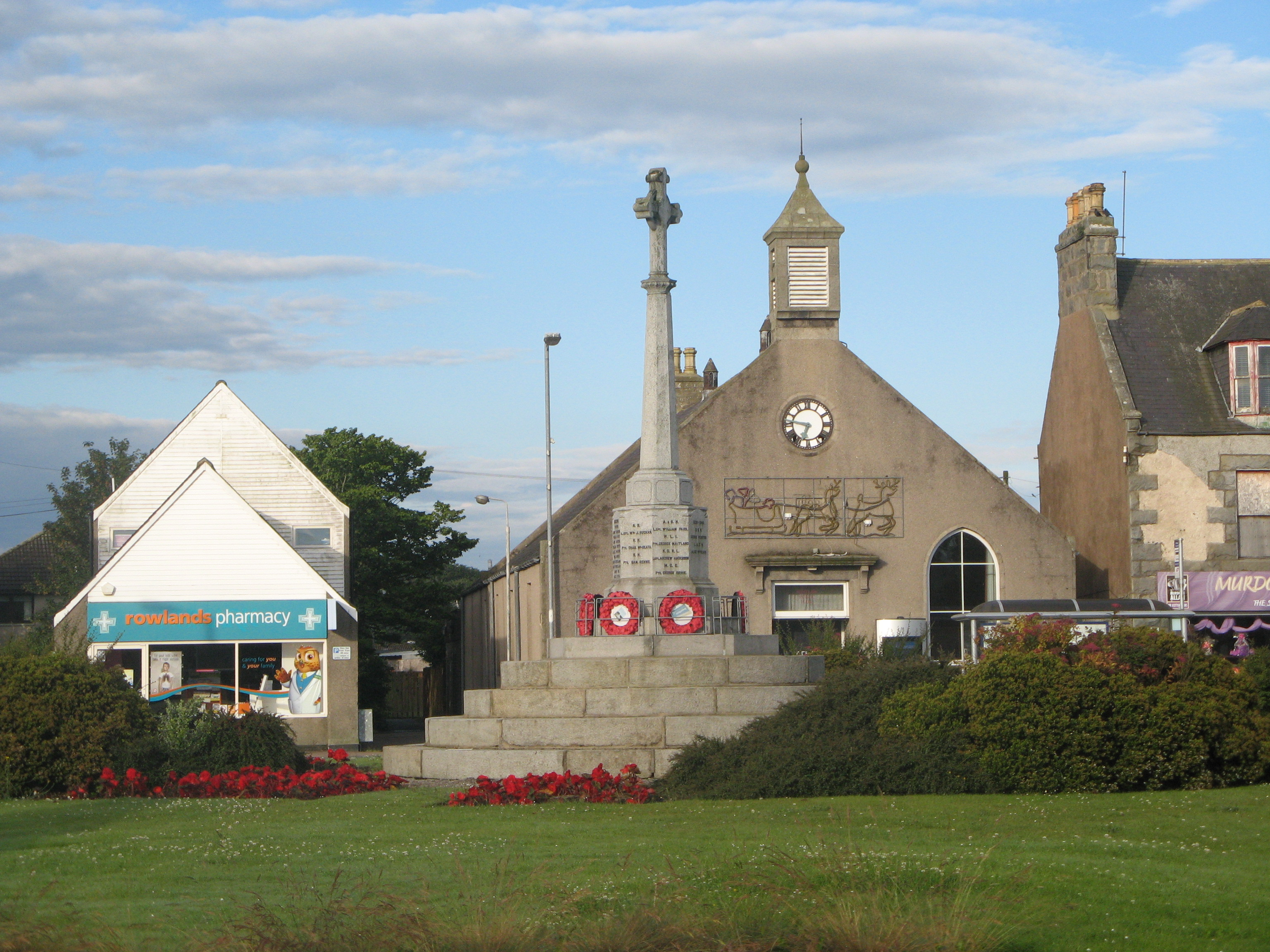

- Location within Aberdeenshire
- Population: 2,800 (2020)
- OS grid reference: NK000483
- Council area: Aberdeenshire
- Lieutenancy area: Aberdeenshire
- Country: Scotland
- Sovereign state: United Kingdom
- Post town: PETERHEAD
- Postcode district: AB42
- Dialling code: 01771
- Police: Scotland
- Fire: Scottish
- Ambulance: Scottish
- UK Parliament: Aberdeenshire North and Moray East
- Scottish Parliament: Aberdeenshire East
- Website: aberdeenshire.gov.uk

Mintlaw (literally meaning a smooth, flat place) is a large village in Aberdeenshire, Scotland. It lies at the intersection of the A950 and A952 roads, west of Peterhead. The 2001 UK census records a population of 2,647 people.

It supports a number of shops and local amenities such as a police station, library, dental surgery and group doctors' practice.

Aberdeenshire Museums Service is based in a new purpose-built museum building housing Aberdeenshire's large reserve collections, a conservation laboratory and the Discovery Centre. The service also runs another three museums: the nearby Aberdeenshire Farming Museum at Aden Country Park, home to the service nationally recognised agricultural collection, Arbuthnot Museum in Peterhead and Banchory Museum. Aden Country Park also contains a ruined mansion house, forest walks and a theme park.

== History ==
The local area is rich in prehistory and historical features. Somewhat to the south of Mintlaw are a number of prehistoric monuments including Catto Long Barrow, Silver Cairn and many tumuli. In that same vicinity of the Laeca Burn watershed is the point d'appui of historical battles between invading Danes and indigenous Picts.

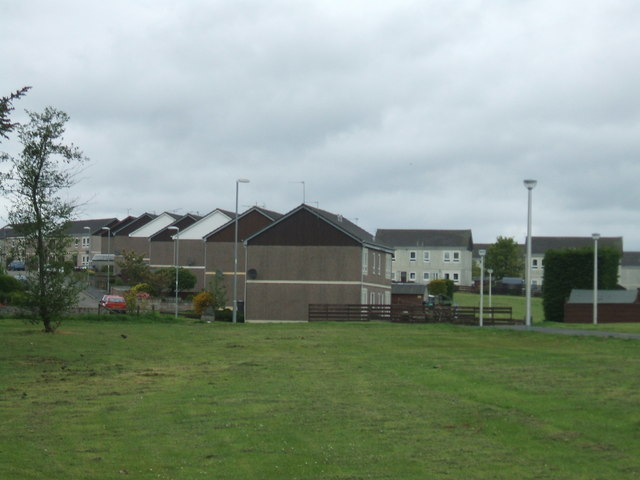
Modular housing built at Mintlaw in the 1980s

Mintlaw was formed as a planned village around 1813 by James Ferguson the third Laird of Pitfour. Unlike many planned villages of the time, trees lined the streets and instead of having a square at the centre of the village, it was diamond-shaped. It was later redesigned to become a roundabout on the main route between Aberdeen and Fraserburgh.

Victorian times saw the coming in the 1860s of the Formartine and Buchan Railway from Dyce via Maud Junction to Peterhead. Mintlaw was a scheduled stop on this line. Old Deer and Mintlaw railway station was built a little to the west of the village, perhaps because this was more convenient for the Ferguson family of Pitfour and the Russell family of Aden. More affluent homes were built on Station Road to house businesses and professional people. The Post Office moved closer to the railway and became a Crown Office. Mintlaw Station was the postal address for this whole district for many years. The Crown Post Office was combined with that in Peterhead with the railway closure in the 1960s, and the village post office moved back to South Street. Telephone numbers, too, were Mintlaw Station until the early 1970s when the word Station was dropped.

Although the date of the village's founding is not known for sure; 2013 was marked as its bicentenary year.

== Governance ==
Mintlaw is in the Buchan administrative area of Aberdeenshire and as of 2012 was the second-largest settlement of the area after Peterhead. For elections to the Scottish Parliament, the village is in the Aberdeenshire East and the North East Scotland electoral region. For elections to the House of Commons, Mintlaw is in the Aberdeenshire North and Moray East constituency, having been within the Banff and Buchan constituency before the 2024 general election.

== Schools ==
Mintlaw has two primary schools: Mintlaw Primary School and Pitfour School.

Mintlaw Academy, on Station Road, is a local authority-run comprehensive secondary school serving Central Buchan. Prior to its opening on 9 December 1981, pupils in the school's catchment area travelled to academies in either Fraserburgh, Peterhead, Turrif or Ellon.

== Notable people ==
- Kim Little (born 1990), footballer and former vice-captain for the Scotland national team.
