= Formartine and Buchan Way =

Great Trail in Aberdeenshire, Scotland

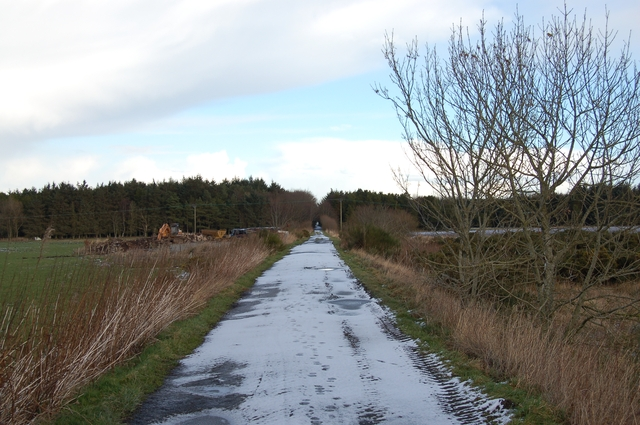
- Formartine and Buchan Way at Logierieve.
- Length: 64 km (40 mi) to Fraserburgh, plus 21 km (13 mi) spur to Peterhead.
- Location: Aberdeenshire, Scotland
- Designation: Scotland's Great Trails
- Trailheads: Dyce railway station 57.2056°N 2.1923°W; Fraserburgh 57.6933°N 2.0037°W or; Peterhead 57.5088°N 1.7935°W
- Use: hiking, cycling, horse riding
- Elevation gain/loss: 420 metres (1,380 ft) gain
- Season: All Year
- Website: https://www.aberdeenshire.gov.uk/paths-and-outdoor-access/long-distance-routes/formartine-and-buchan-way/

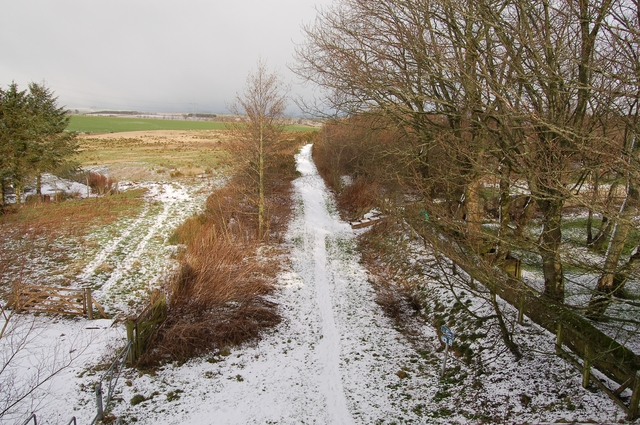
Udny Station looking along the footpath.

The Formartine and Buchan Way is a long-distance trail in Scotland, extending from Dyce north to Peterhead and Fraserburgh in the Buchan and Formartine districts of Aberdeenshire in Scotland. It follows the track of a former railway line, the Formartine and Buchan Railway, and is open to walkers, cyclists and horse riders. The railway closed in 1979 (Fraserburgh) and 1970 (Maud-Peterhead). The walkway opened in the early 1990s, and is managed by Aberdeenshire Council. It is listed as one of Scotland's Great Trails by NatureScot. Highlights along the route include Aden Country Park, Deer Abbey at Old Deer, the White Horse at Mormond Hill, and several sites associated with the area’s railway heritage.

The total path is around 85 kilometres (53 mi) long if both spurs are travelled and can be accessed relatively easily by public transport or car. An information pack detailing the route has been produced by Aberdeenshire Council: the pack can be purchased from local tourist information centres and is also available to download. The route is also marked on OS maps. The path is well signposted and is easy to follow. The track is relatively flat and undulates only when roads have to be crossed. It is mostly well mowed. The Maud to Strichen section has a detour because of overgrown shrubbery, marshy conditions and impassable fencing.

Much of the route is not suitable for those on adapted cycles, due to frequent access barriers, except where the route is shared by National Cycle Network Route 1, between Auchnagatt and Maud.

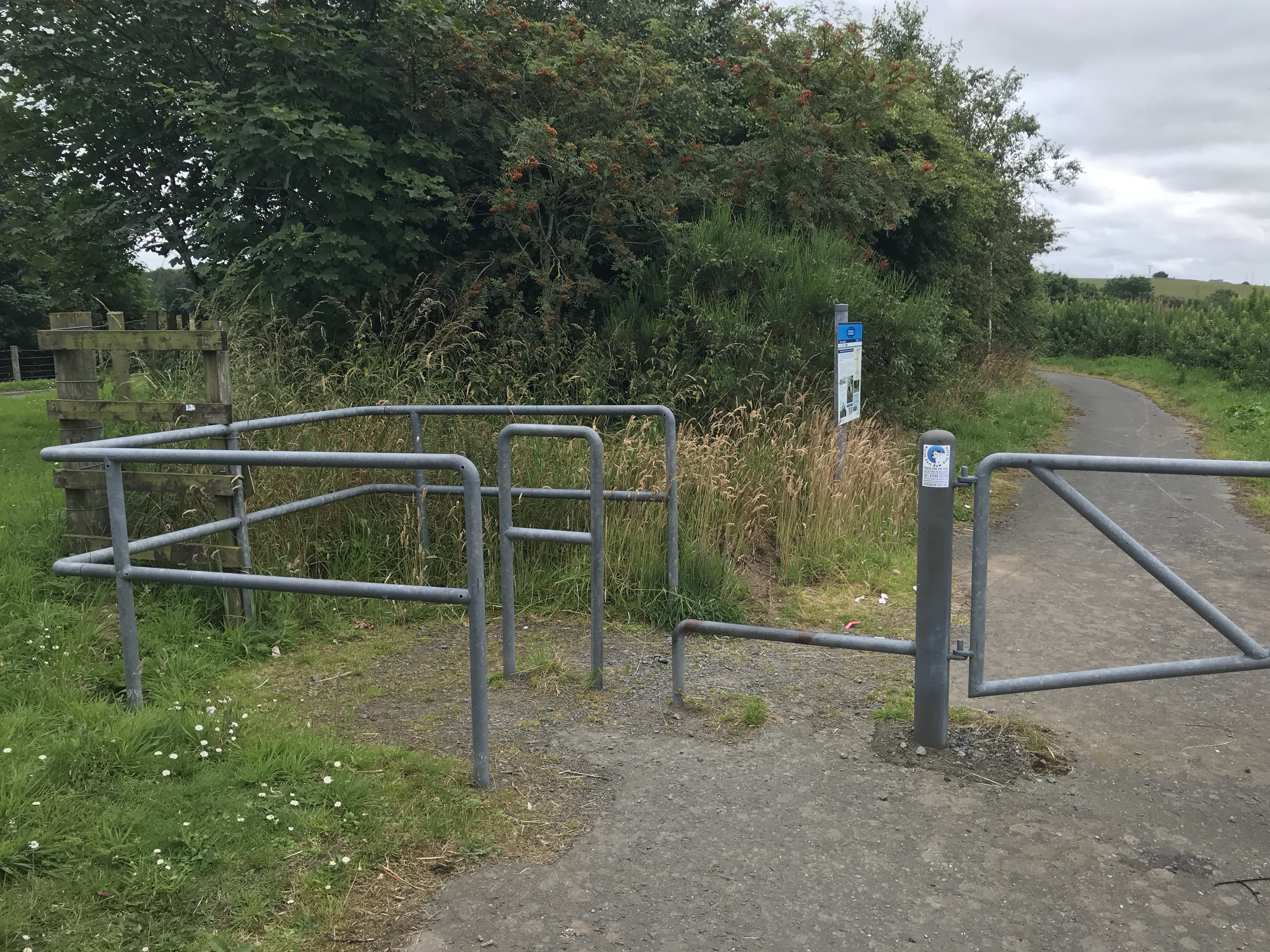
Access barrier at Auchnagatt.

== Sections ==
Start point	End point	Length		Notes
Start point	End point	km	mi	Notes
Dyce	Udny Station	13	8.1	
Udny Station	Ellon	8	5.0	
Ellon	Auchnagatt	12	7.5	
Auchnagatt	Maud	7	4.3	
Maud	Strichen	9	5.6	
Strichen	Fraserburgh	17.5	10.9	
Dyce	Fraserburgh	64	40	Total excluding Peterhead branch
Maud	Longside	11.5	7.1	Peterhead branch
Longside	Peterhead	10.5	6.5	Peterhead branch
Maud	Peterhead	21	13	Total for Peterhead branch
Complete route		85	53	

== History of the route ==
The 29-mile (47 km) long railway from Dyce to Mintlaw railway station opened on 18 July 1861, with the 13-mile (21 km) section from Maud to Peterhead railway station opening the following year. A 15-mile (24 km) long section north to Fraserburgh railway station opened on 24 April 1865. Passenger services were withdrawn by the Scottish Region of British Railways in 1965 as part of the Beeching cuts. Freight trains continued to operate to Peterhead until 1970 and Fraserburgh until 1979. This was in spite of the fact a considerable amount of freight traffic was being generated by the off-shore oil and gas industry. Conversion of the line to a footpath and cycleway started in 1987, and was led by the Buchan Countryside Group.

== See also ==
- Deeside Way
