= Abbey of Deer Platform railway station =

Disused railway station in Maud, Aberdeenshire

Coordinates: 57.5229°N 2.0579°W

Abbey of Deer Platform

General information
- Location: Maud, Aberdeenshire; Scotland
- Platforms: 1

Other information
- Status: Disused

History
- Opened: 1932
- Closed: 1938
- Original company: London and North Eastern Railway
Location

Abbey of Deer Platform was a small railway station on the branch line from Maud to Peterhead in the Scottish county of Aberdeenshire.

== History ==
The station was opened by the London and North Eastern Railway. It was built to serve the needs of pilgrims visiting the nearby Roman Catholic Abbey and was not an advertised stop. Opening and closing dates are not recorded however it was actively used in the 1930s and 1940s.

It was the shortest platformed halt on the old Great North of Scotland Railway system and was a single wooden railway sleeper depth and length only, accessed by steps down from the adjacent road over bridge. By 1954 it had been fenced off at the platform edge and access steps.

The line itself closed to passengers in 1965 and freight in 1970.

== Services ==
Preceding station	Disused railways	Following station
Maud; Line and station closed	London and North Eastern Railway	Mintlaw; Line and station closed
