= Brucklay railway station =

Disused railway station in Brucklay, Aberdeenshire

Coordinates: 57.54431°N 2.12367°W

Brucklay
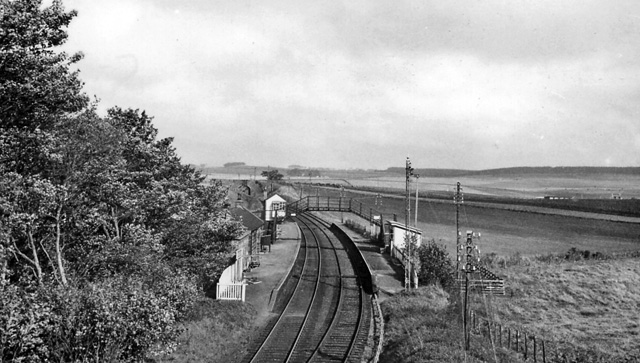
- The station in 1961

General information
- Location: Brucklay, Aberdeenshire; Scotland
- Platforms: 2

Other information
- Status: Disused

History
- Original company: Formartine and Buchan Railway
- Pre-grouping: Great North of Scotland Railway
- Post-grouping: LNER

Key dates
- 24 April 1865: Opened
- 4 October 1965: Closed to passengers
- 28 March 1966: closed for goods
Location

Brucklay railway station was a former railway station in Brucklay, Aberdeenshire.

== History ==
The station was opened on 24 April 1865 by the Formartine and Buchan Railway. On the northbound platform was the station building on the west side was the goods yard and on the north end of the northbound platform was the signal box, which opened in 1891. It closed in 1959 and was replaced by a ground frame. The station closed on 4 October 1965 and closed to goods on 28 March 1966.

Preceding station	Disused railways	Following station
Strichen; Line and station closed	Great North of Scotland Railway; Formartine and Buchan Railway	Maud; Line and station closed
