= Newseat Halt railway station =

Disused railway station in Newseat, Aberdeenshire

Coordinates: 57.5226°N 1.8717°W

Newseat Halt
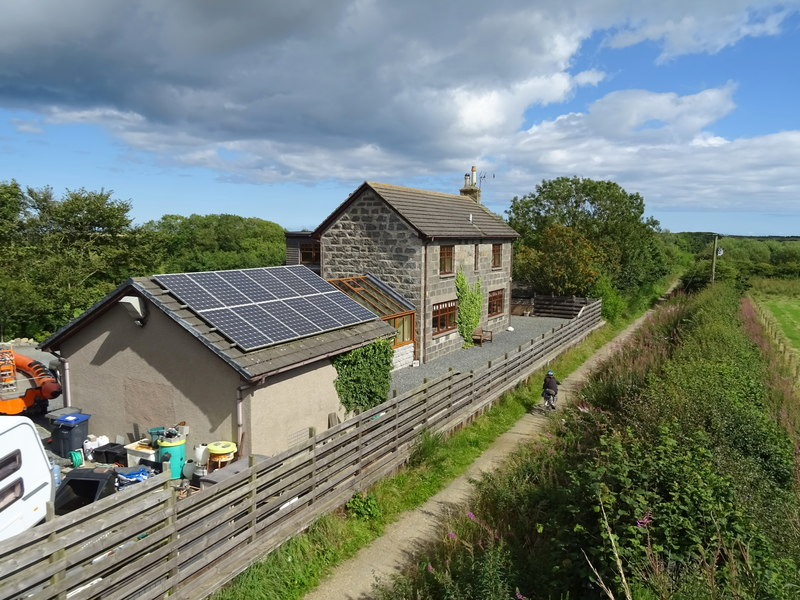
- The former station house in 2020

General information
- Location: Newseat, Aberdeenshire; Scotland
- Platforms: 1

Other information
- Status: Disused

History
- Original company: Formartine and Buchan Railway
- Pre-grouping: Great North of Scotland Railway
- Post-grouping: London and North Eastern Railway

Key dates
- 3 July 1862: Opened as Newseat
- 22 September 1930: Name changed to Newseat Halt
- 3 May 1965: Closed
Location

Newseat Halt railway station was a railway station in Newseat, Aberdeenshire.

== History ==
The station was opened on 3 July 1862 by the Formartine and Buchan Railway. It was known as New Seat until 1884 in the timetable. Its name was changed Newseat Halt on 22 September 1930. It was closed to passengers under the Beeching Axe on 3 May 1965.

Preceding station	Disused railways	Following station
Longside; Line and station closed	Great North of Scotland Railway; Formartine and Buchan Railway	Inverugie; Line and station closed
