= Longside railway station =

Disused railway station in Longside, Aberdeenshire

Coordinates: 57.5217°N 1.9359°W

Longside
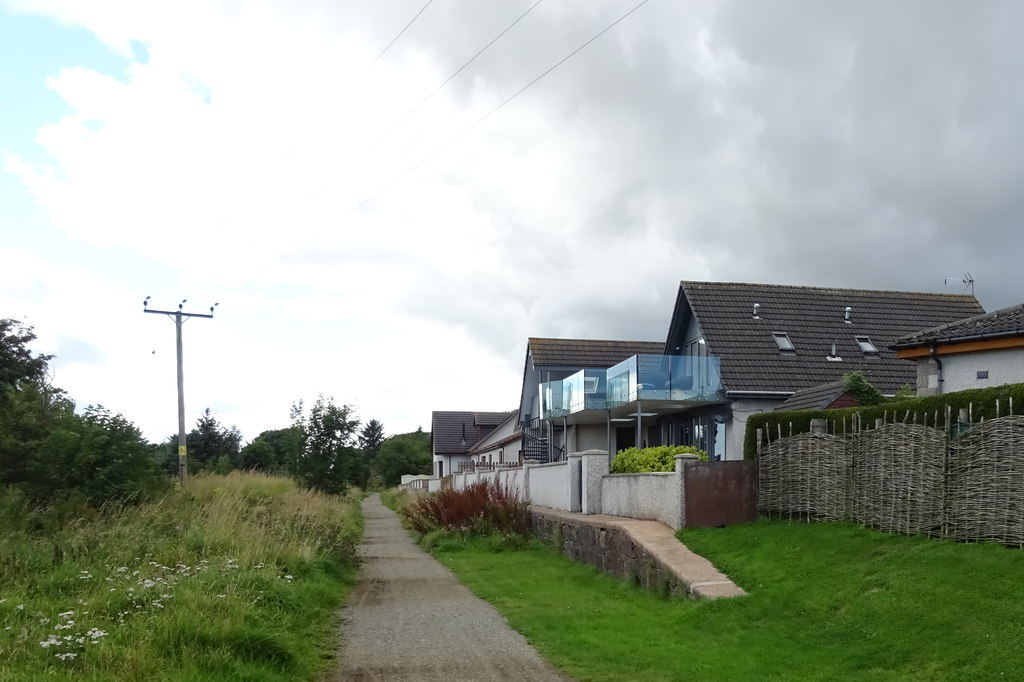

General information
- Location: Longside, Aberdeenshire; Scotland
- Platforms: 2

Other information
- Status: Disused

History
- Original company: Formartine and Buchan Railway
- Pre-grouping: Great North of Scotland Railway
- Post-grouping: London and North Eastern Railway

Key dates
- 3 July 1862: Opened
- 3 May 1965: Closed
Location

Longside railway station was a railway station in Longside, Aberdeenshire.

== History ==
The station was opened on 3 July 1862. On the north side was the goods yard. There were two signal boxes, North and South, both opening in 1890. The north signal box was at the west end of the westbound platform and the south signal box was at the east end of the eastbound platform. After resignalling in 1918, the south signal box closed. The north signal box was renamed to Longside box. The station was closed to passengers under the Beeching Axe on 3 May 1965. The signal box closed along with it. The tracks were lifted in 1970.

Preceding station	Disused railways	Following station
Mintlaw; Line and station closed	Great North of Scotland Railway; Formartine and Buchan Railway	Newseat; Line and station closed
