= List of listed buildings in Old Deer, Aberdeenshire =

This is a list of listed buildings in the parish of Old Deer in Aberdeenshire, Scotland.

== List ==
Name	Location	Date Listed	Grid Ref. (Note: Sometimes known as OSGB36, the grid reference (where provided) is based on the British national grid reference system used by the Ordnance Survey. • "Guide to National Grid". Ordnance Survey. • "Get-a-map". Ordnance Survey.)	Geo-coordinates	Notes	LB Number (Note: Historic Environment Scotland assign a unique alphanumeric identifier to each designated site in Scotland, for listed buildings this always begins with "LB", for example "LB12345".)	Image
North-East Bridge The Lake, Pitfour (Captain Curzon)	Pitfour estate			57°31′47″N 2°02′05″W	Category B	19773	Upload another image
Saplinbrae				57°31′32″N 2°02′49″W	Category B	16061	Upload Photo
South Lodge Gates, Pitfour	Pitfour estate			57°31′30″N 2°02′17″W	Category B	16063	Upload Photo
1, 3, 5 Kirkgate				57°31′09″N 2°02′14″W	Category C(S)	16086	Upload Photo
Deer Abbey, Enclosing Wall And Adjoining Walled Garden				57°31′24″N 2°03′06″W	Category B	16105	Upload Photo
St. Drestan's Episcopal Church, Old Deer				57°31′09″N 2°02′17″W	Category B	16116	Upload Photo
The Stables, Pitfour (Mr. Watson)	Pitfour estate			57°31′59″N 2°02′07″W	Category B	16070	Upload another image
Windhill Farm				57°30′32″N 2°04′50″W	Category B	16103	Upload Photo
Parish Church				57°31′09″N 2°02′13″W	Category B	16113	Upload Photo
4,6 Kirkgate				57°31′08″N 2°02′15″W	Category C(S)	13882	Upload Photo
Pitfour Estate, Station Lodge, Including Gates And Gatepiers	Pitfour estate			57°31′43″N 2°01′38″W	Category C(S)	18834	Upload Photo
North Auchmachar, Farmhouse				57°32′42″N 2°04′37″W	Category B	16078	Upload Photo
North Lodge, Aden	Aden Country Park			57°31′34″N 2°01′37″W	Category C(S)	16097	Upload another image
1 Abbey Street And 2 Kirkgate Old Deer				57°31′09″N 2°02′15″W	Category B	16115	Upload Photo
Walled Garden Including Bothy, Potting Shed And Head Gardener's House	Aden Country Park			57°31′15″N 2°01′50″W	Category C(S)	50906	Upload Photo
13, 15, 17 Abbey Street				57°31′10″N 2°02′21″W	Category C(S)	19774	Upload Photo
Pitfour West Lodge	Pitfour estate			57°32′10″N 2°04′46″W	Category C(S)	18963	Upload Photo
Bruxie Lodge, Pitfour	Pitfour estate			57°31′45″N 2°04′06″W	Category B	16064	Upload Photo
Temple Of Theseus, The Lake, Pitfour (Captain Curzon)	Pitfour estate			57°31′42″N 2°02′38″W	Category B	16068	Upload another image
The Larder, Pitfour (Mr. Watson)	Pitfour estate			57°32′01″N 2°02′17″W	Category C(S)	16071	Upload Photo
The Observatory, Drinnie's Wood, Pitfour (Forestry Commission)	Pitfour estate			57°32′20″N 2°02′45″W	Category B	16074	Upload another image
Emah Roo. (Old Tollhouse) Near Coilsmore				57°32′04″N 2°05′35″W	Category C(S)	16077	Upload Photo
Aden Arms Hotel				57°31′10″N 2°02′23″W	Category C(S)	16082	Upload Photo
2, 4 Abbey Street				57°31′10″N 2°02′16″W	Category C(S)	16083	Upload Photo
Bridge Of Deer Over South Ugie Water				57°31′12″N 2°02′13″W	Category B	16087	Upload Photo
Aden Icehouse				57°31′13″N 2°02′06″W	Category C(S)	16094	Upload Photo
Biffie Farmhouse				57°30′56″N 2°02′57″W	Category B	16098	Upload Photo
Milladen, Mill				57°30′46″N 2°01′43″W	Category B	16100	Upload Photo
11 Abbey Street				57°31′09″N 2°02′20″W	Category C(S)	16118	Upload Photo
Cheverton House				57°30′46″N 2°02′24″W	Category B	19775	Upload Photo
Waulkmill, Quartalehouse				57°30′28″N 2°02′35″W	Category B	19776	Upload Photo
Pitfour Estate, South Lodge	Pitfour estate			57°31′30″N 2°02′18″W	Category C(S)	18975	Upload Photo
Ardallie Manse				57°26′30″N 1°59′17″W	Category C(S)	16058	Upload Photo
'The Boathouse', The Lake, Pitfour (Captain Curzon)	Pitfour estate			57°31′48″N 2°02′37″W	Category C(S)	16067	Upload another image
The Kennels Cottage, Pitfour (Captain Curzon)	Pitfour estate			57°31′53″N 2°02′42″W	Category B	16069	Upload Photo
Fetterangus Church				57°32′43″N 2°01′58″W	Category C(S)	16079	Upload Photo
Old Bridge Of Gaval Over North Ugie Water				57°33′20″N 2°00′36″W	Category B	16080	Upload Photo
Aden House	Aden Country Park			57°31′14″N 2°02′04″W	Category B	16093	Upload another image
3, 5 Abbey Street				57°31′09″N 2°02′18″W	Category C(S)	16117	Upload Photo
North East Folklore Archive, Former Laundry	Aden Country Park			57°31′16″N 2°02′01″W	Category C(S)	50905	Upload Photo
Brae Of Coynach House				57°29′12″N 2°01′04″W	Category B	16055	Upload Photo
Skelmuir House				57°28′34″N 2°02′01″W	Category C(S)	16056	Upload Photo
Ardallie Church				57°26′29″N 1°59′16″W	Category B	16057	Upload Photo
Cartlehaugh				57°31′30″N 2°02′10″W	Category B	16062	Upload Photo
The Laundry, Pitfour (Mr. Watson)	Pitfour estate			57°32′00″N 2°02′22″W	Category C(S)	16072	Upload Photo
Mill Of Clackriach, House				57°31′13″N 2°06′32″W	Category C(S)	16075	Upload Photo
Mill Of Clackriach, Mill				57°31′13″N 2°06′32″W	Category B	16076	Upload Photo
West Lodge, Aden				57°31′17″N 2°02′15″W	Category C(S)	16091	Upload Photo
Brae Of Biffie Farmhouse				57°30′29″N 2°03′25″W	Category B	16099	Upload Photo
Grain Mill, 31 Mill Street, Stuartfield				57°30′04″N 2°02′49″W	Category B	16102	Upload Photo
Deer Abbey				57°31′23″N 2°03′15″W	Category B	16104	Upload Photo
Newlands				57°31′27″N 2°03′12″W	Category B	16060	Upload Photo
South East Bridge, The Lake Pitfour (Captain Curzon)	Pitfour estate			57°31′40″N 2°02′13″W	Category C(S)	16065	Upload Photo
North-West Bridge, The Lake, Pitfour (Captain Curzon)	Pitfour estate			57°31′50″N 2°02′49″W	Category C(S)	16066	Upload Photo
New Bridge Of Gaval Over North Ugie Water				57°33′07″N 2°00′09″W	Category C(S)	16081	Upload Photo
Clydesdale Bank, Abbey Street				57°31′10″N 2°02′17″W	Category B	16084	Upload Photo
Post Office, Abbey Street				57°31′10″N 2°02′19″W	Category B	16085	Upload Photo
Manse Of Old Deer				57°31′17″N 2°02′29″W	Category B	16088	Upload Photo
The Cottage, Russell Street				57°31′07″N 2°02′25″W	Category C(S)	16090	Upload Photo
Bridge Over South Ugie Water In Aden Policies S Of Items 15 And 20				57°31′11″N 2°02′09″W	Category C(S)	16095	Upload Photo
Aberdeenshire Farming Museum, Formerly Aden House Stables	Aden Country Park			57°31′18″N 2°01′58″W	Category A	16096	Upload another image
Old Parish Church And Churchyard				57°31′10″N 2°02′12″W	Category B	16114	Upload Photo
Abbey Bridge				57°31′24″N 2°03′28″W	Category B	16059	Upload Photo
The Chapel, Pitfour (Mr. Watson)	Pitfour estate			57°31′56″N 2°01′54″W	Category C(S)	16073	Upload another image
Manse Of Old Deer, Offices				57°31′15″N 2°02′27″W	Category C(S)	16089	Upload Photo
Bridge Over South Ugie Water In Aden Policies E Of Bridge Of Deer				57°31′07″N 2°02′09″W	Category C(S)	16092	Upload Photo
The Sycamores, Quartalehouse				57°30′29″N 2°02′34″W	Category C(S)	16101	Upload Photo

== Key ==
The scheme for classifying buildings in Scotland is:

- Category A: "buildings of national or international importance, either architectural or historic; or fine, little-altered examples of some particular period, style or building type."
- Category B: "buildings of regional or more than local importance; or major examples of some particular period, style or building type, which may have been altered."
- Category C: "buildings of local importance; lesser examples of any period, style, or building type, as originally constructed or moderately altered; and simple traditional buildings which group well with other listed buildings."

In March 2016 there were 47,288 listed buildings in Scotland. Of these, 8% were Category A, and 50% were Category B, with the remaining 42% being Category C.

== See also ==
- List of listed buildings in Aberdeenshire
