= Mintlaw railway station =

Disused railway station in Mintlaw, Aberdeenshire

Coordinates: 57.5268°N 2.0191°W

Mintlaw
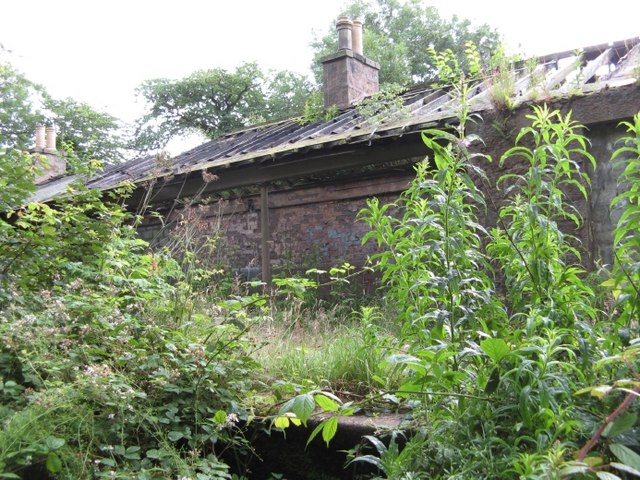
- The site of the station in 2007

General information
- Location: Mintlaw, Aberdeenshire; Scotland
- Platforms: 1 (initially); 2 (later added)

Other information
- Status: Disused

History
- Original company: Formartine and Buchan Railway
- Pre-grouping: Great North of Scotland Railway
- Post-grouping: London and North Eastern Railway

Key dates
- 18 July 1861: Opened as Old Deer and Mintlaw
- 1 December 1867: Name changed to Mintlaw
- 3 May 1965: Closed
Location

Mintlaw railway station was a railway station in Mintlaw, Aberdeenshire (Scotland).

== History ==
The 29 mile long railway from Dyce to Mintlaw opened on 18 July 1861, with the extension to Peterhead opening the following year. This station opened as Old Deer and Mintlaw. The station building was on the westbound platform and the goods yard was on the south side. Two signal boxes opened in 1888: the north box, which was at the east end of the westbound platform and the south box, which was to the west of the eastbound platform. The north box closed in 1927 and the south box closed in 1959, being replaced by a ground frame. Passenger services on the Buchan lines were withdrawn on 3 May 1965 as part of the Beeching cuts. Freight trains continued to operate to Peterhead until 1970. The track through Maud station was subsequently lifted and the route now forms part of the Formartine and Buchan Way. The station building and the platforms remain.

Preceding station	Disused railways	Following station
Abbey of Deer Platform; Line and station closed	Great North of Scotland Railway; Formartine and Buchan Railway	Longside; Line and station closed
