= Lonmay railway station =

Disused railway station in Lonmay, Aberdeenshire

Coordinates: 57.6186°N 1.9784°W

Lonmay
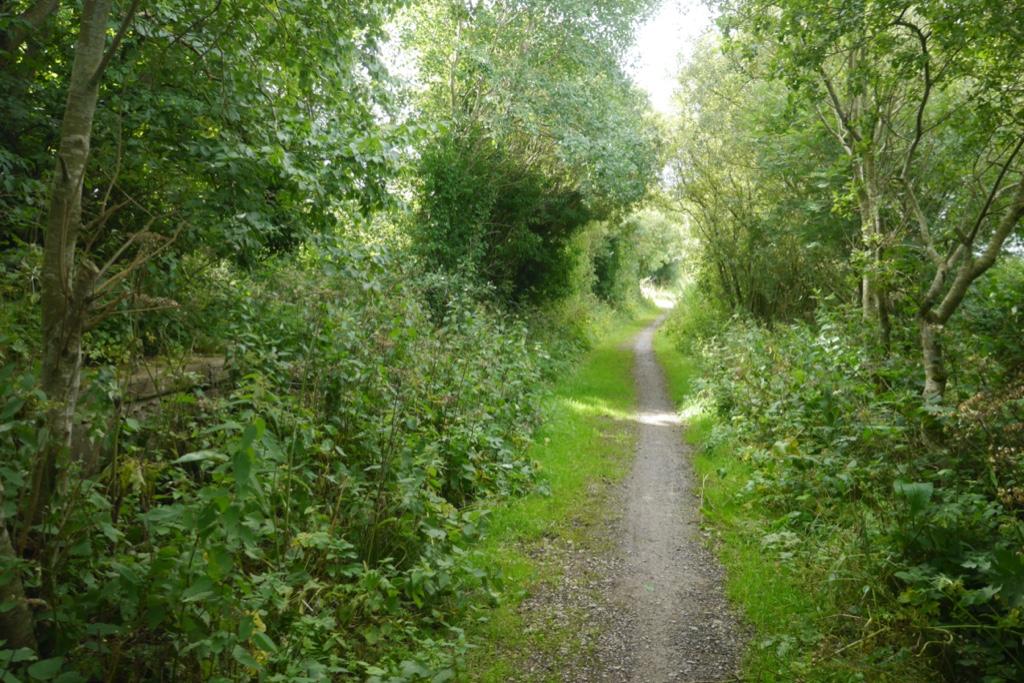
- The site of the station in 2020

General information
- Location: Lonmay, Aberdeenshire; Scotland
- Platforms: 2

Other information
- Status: Disused

History
- Original company: Formartine and Buchan Railway
- Pre-grouping: Great North of Scotland Railway
- Post-grouping: London and North Eastern Railway

Key dates
- 24 April 1865: Opened
- 4 October 1965: Closed
Location

Lonmay railway station was a railway station in Lonmay, Aberdeenshire.

== History ==
The station was opened on 24 April 1865 by the Formartine and Buchan Railway. On the east side was the goods yard and at the north end of the platform was the signal box, which opened in 1892. The station closed on 4 October 1965.

| Preceding station | Disused railways | Following station |
|---|---|---|
| Rathen; Line and station closed | Great North of Scotland Railway; Formartine and Buchan Railway | Mormond; Line and station closed |
