= Auchnagatt railway station =

Disused railway station in Auchnagott, Aberdeenshire

Auchnagatt
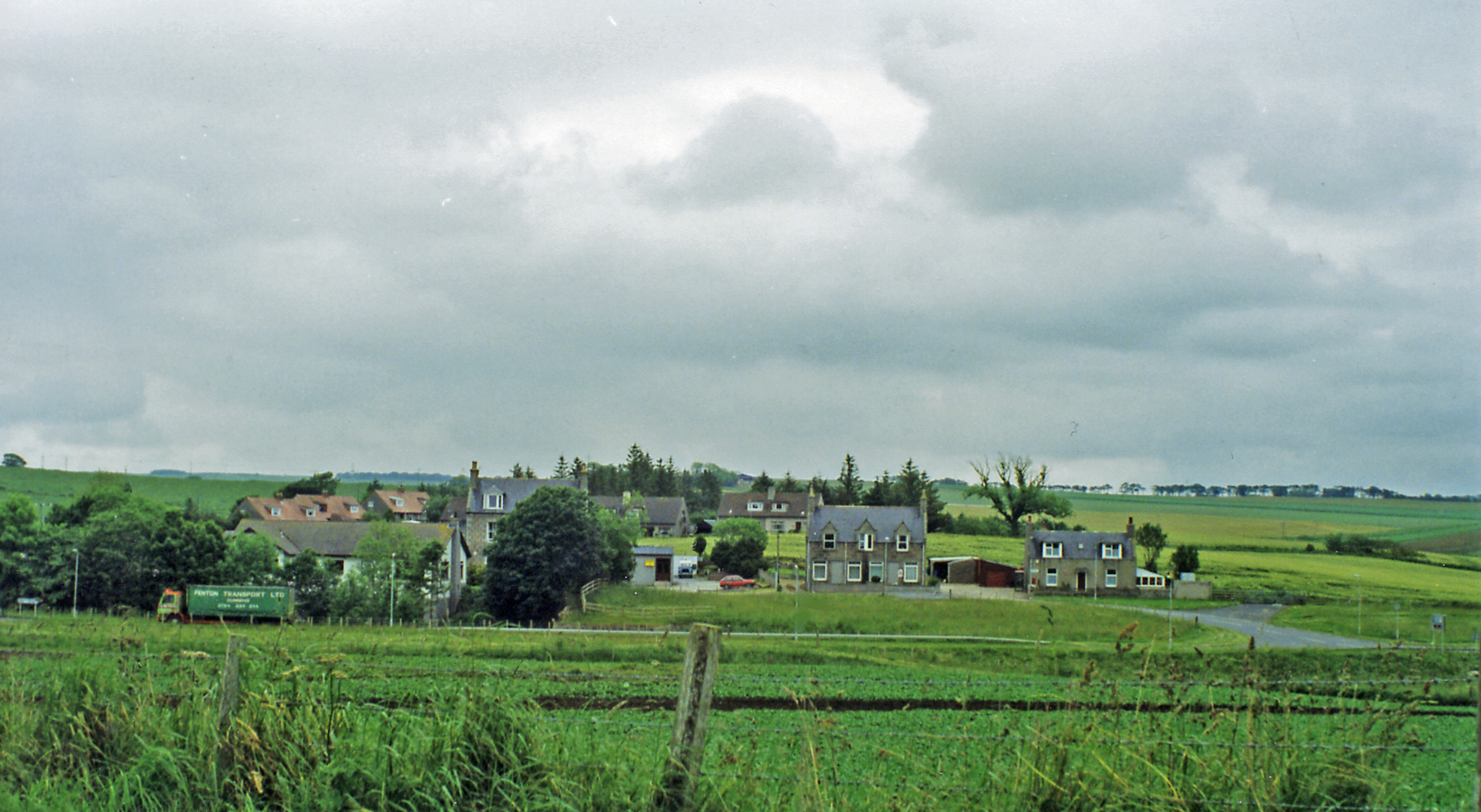
- Location of the station (1997)

General information
- Location: Auchnagatt, Aberdeenshire; Scotland
- Coordinates: 57.467°N 2.117°W
- Platforms: 2

Other information
- Status: Disused

History
- Original company: Formartine and Buchan Railway
- Pre-grouping: Great North of Scotland Railway
- Post-grouping: London and North Eastern Railway

Key dates
- 18 July 1861: Station opened
- 4 October 1965: Station closed
Location

Auchnagatt railway station was a railway station in Auchnagatt, Aberdeenshire. Before its closure, services ran to Fraserburgh, Peterhead and Aberdeen.

== History ==
The station was opened by the Formartine and Buchan Railway, then part of the Great North of Scotland Railway. It became part of the London and North Eastern Railway during the Grouping of 1923, and then passed on to the Scottish Region of British Railways during the nationalisation of 1948. It was then closed to passengers by the British Railways Board in 1965 under the Beeching Axe. It stayed open for goods until 28 March 1966.

== The site today ==
The station is still fairly intact beside the lifted railway. One platform still remains.

Preceding station	Historical railways	Following station
Arnage	Great North of Scotland Railway	Maud
