= Strichen railway station =

Disused railway station in Strichen, Aberdeenshire

Coordinates: 57.5842°N 2.0866°W

Strichen
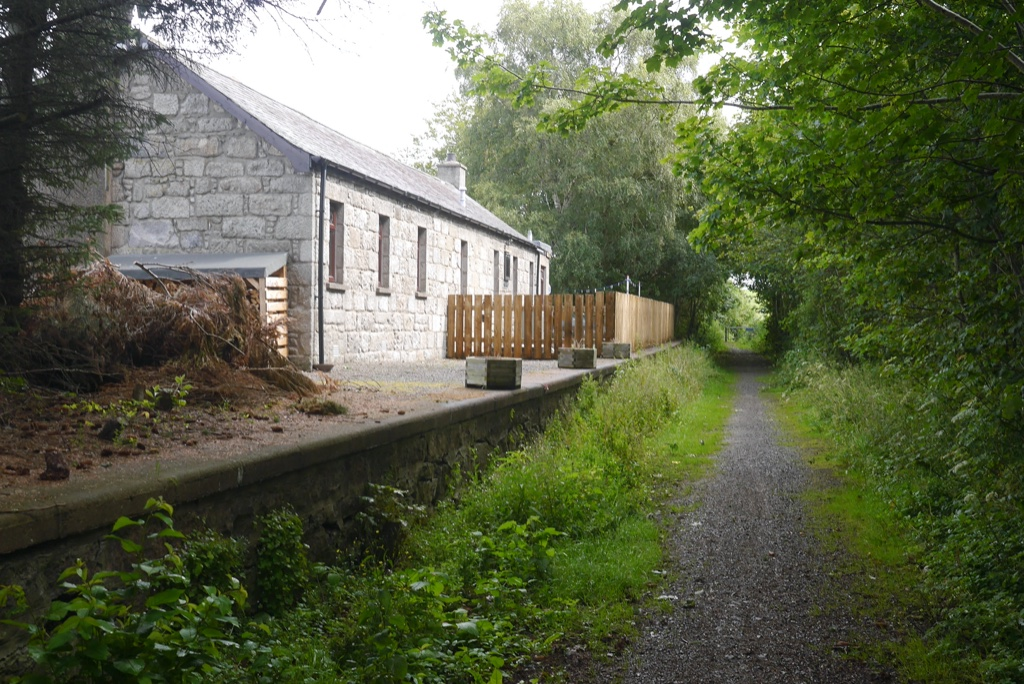
- The site of the station in 2020

General information
- Location: Strichen, Aberdeenshire; Scotland
- Platforms: 2

Other information
- Status: Disused

History
- Original company: Formartine and Buchan Railway
- Pre-grouping: Great North of Scotland Railway
- Post-grouping: London and North Eastern Railway

Key dates
- 24 April 1865: Opened
- 4 October 1965: Closed
Location

Strichen railway station was a railway station in Strichen, Aberdeenshire.

== History ==
The station was opened on 24 April 1865 by the Formartine and Buchan Railway. On the northbound platform was the station building, on the north side was the goods yard and at the west end of the westbound platform was the signal box, which opened in 1891. The station closed on 4 October 1965.

Preceding station	Disused railways	Following station
Mormond; Line and station closed	Great North of Scotland Railway; Formartine and Buchan Railway	Brucklay; Line and station closed
