= Mormond Halt railway station =

Disused railway station in New Leeds, Aberdeenshire

Coordinates: 57.5937°N 2.0258°W

Mormond Halt
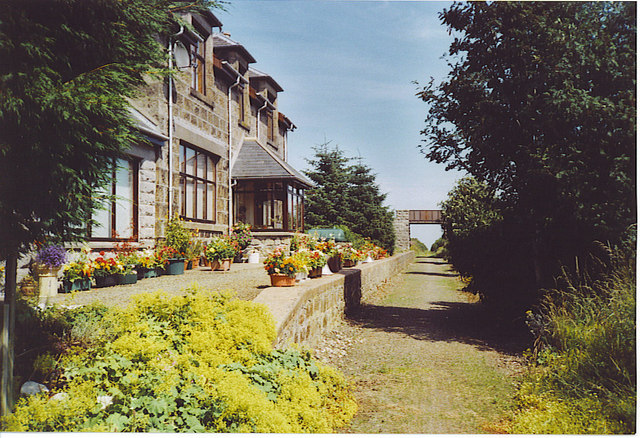
- The site of the station in 2006

General information
- Location: New Leeds, Aberdeenshire; Scotland
- Platforms: 1

Other information
- Status: Disused

History
- Original company: Formartine and Buchan Railway
- Pre-grouping: Great North of Scotland Railway
- Post-grouping: London and North Eastern Railway

Key dates
- 24 April 1865: Opened as Mormomd
- 1 June 1939: Name changed to Mormond Halt
- 2 October 1965: Closed
Location

Mormond Halt railway station was a railway station near New Leeds, Aberdeenshire.

== History ==
The station was opened as Mormond on 24 April 1865. It was named after Mormond Hill, which was nearby. Its name was changed to Mormond Halt on 1 June 1939. It was reduced to a Saturday only service in 1950 and closed on 2 October 1965.

Preceding station	Disused railways	Following station
Lonmay; Line and station closed	Formartine and Buchan Railway	Strichen; Line and station closed
