= Auchnagatt =

Coordinates: 57.466°N 2.114°W

Auchnagatt: Scottish Gaelic: Achadh nan Cat
- Village
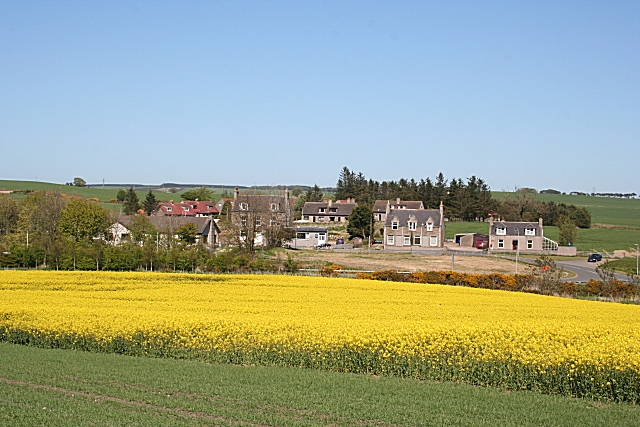
- Auchnagatt

- Location within Aberdeenshire
- OS grid reference: NJ932417
- Council area: Aberdeenshire
- Lieutenancy area: Aberdeenshire
- Country: Scotland
- Sovereign state: United Kingdom
- Post town: ELLON
- Postcode district: AB41
- Dialling code: 01358
- Police: Scotland
- Fire: Scottish
- Ambulance: Scottish
- UK Parliament: Gordon and Buchan
- Scottish Parliament: Aberdeenshire East

Auchnagatt (Scottish Gaelic: Achadh nan Cat) is a village and rural area in Buchan, Aberdeenshire, Scotland, situated on the Ebrie Burn and on the A948 road between Ellon and New Deer.

== Schools ==
Auchnagatt Primary School is situated in the village. The rural areas once supported several primary schools, with those at Clochcan, Knaven and Savoch merging to form Braeside School in 1957. Braeside School in turn was closed in 2005. Arnage School to the south remains open.

Secondary education is provided at Mintlaw Academy, 9 kilometres (5.6 mi) from the village of Auchnagatt.

== Transport ==
Regular public transport is limited to infrequent bus services to Ellon, New Deer and surrounding villages, though an on-demand Dial-a-bus service is also available. The railway station closed to passengers in 1965 and now offers an access point to the Formartine and Buchan Way, the long-distance path that follows the route of the former railway.

== Other facilities ==
Facilities in the village include a village hall and a general store ("Taylor's Emporium") which is now closed. There also used to be a hotel and pub/function room called The Barons which has been closed.

== Sports Team ==
The local football team are called the Auchnagatt Barons, who have been in existence for 36 years. After the 2015/16 season, Auchnagatt Barons achieved promotion to Division 2 of the Aberdeenshire AFA, finishing 2nd in the 3rd division.

== History ==
There is evidence of prehistoric settlement in the area. The remains of two earth houses were found at Windy Hill, south-east of the village, in 1850.

More recent history centred on agriculture until the coming of the railway in the 1860s, when sidings and goods sheds were constructed in the village.

Nowadays Auchnagatt serves largely as a dormitory village for Aberdeen.

== Name ==
Sources dispute the origin of the name Auchnagatt, claiming "field of the wild cats" (Gaelic achadh na' cat), "field of withies" (willows), "place of the roads" (Gaelic achadh nan cat), or a reference to the currachs or wickerwork creels traditionally produced in the area.

== Notable people ==
- Johanna Basford - illustrator and textile designer
