= Clackriach Castle =

16th-century tower house in Scotland

- Near Maud, Aberdeenshire, Scotland

Site information
- Type: Tower house
- Condition: Ruined

Location
- Location in Aberdeenshire
- Coordinates: 57.513734°N 2.114106°W

Site history
- Built: 16th century

Clackriach Castle was a 16th-century tower house, about 11 miles (18 km) north of Ellon, Aberdeenshire, Scotland, and 1 mile (1.6 km) south-east of Maud, south of the South Ugie Water.

Alternative names are Glackriach Castle and Clachraich Castle.

== History ==
The property belonged to the Keiths.

== Structure ==
Only the north-east angle of Clackriach Castle remains, about 7.0 metres (23.0 ft) high. The north wall, which includes part of a window, is about 2.7 metres (8 ft 10 in) long. In the inside angle are remains of a staircase. The walls are roughly coursed with rubble infilling, lime mortared.

The castle was on a slight eminence. It was an oblong building with a projecting wing; there was a turreted staircase, and arched doorway and window, evidence of which remained up to the 19th century.

== Vicinity ==
The disused Mill of Clackriach dates to around 1827. As of 1990, its brick kiln was partly fallen in. Nearby Mill House is of similar age.

Windhill Farm, from the 18th century, sits high on the slopes of the Hill of Dens. It is "a crouching farmhouse with coped chimneys and large granite skew putts with a large porch, c. 1800, and pantiled steading".

== See also ==
- Castles in Great Britain and Ireland
- List of castles in Scotland

== Bibliography ==
- McKean, Charles (1990), Banff & Buchan, Royal Incorporation of Architects in Scotland, ISBN 978-1-85158-231-0
