= Maud, Aberdeenshire =

Coordinates: 57.52210°N 2.12687°W

Maud: Scottish Gaelic: Am Mòd
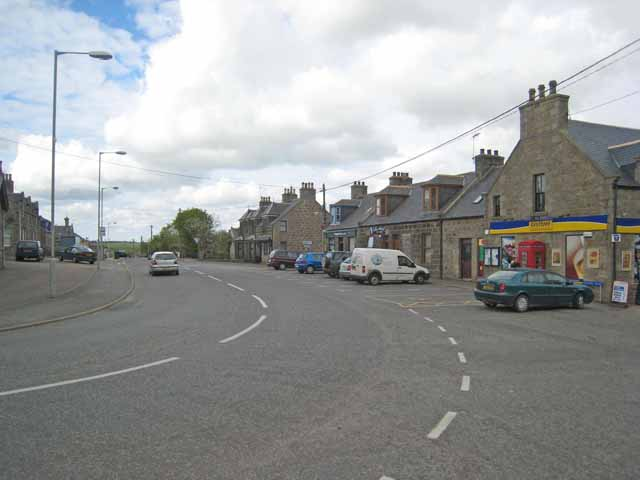
- Maud village centre

- Location within Aberdeenshire
- Population: 910 (2020)
- OS grid reference: NJ925479
- Council area: Aberdeenshire
- Lieutenancy area: Aberdeenshire
- Country: Scotland
- Sovereign state: United Kingdom
- Post town: PETERHEAD
- Postcode district: AB42
- Dialling code: 01771
- Police: Scotland
- Fire: Scottish
- Ambulance: Scottish
- UK Parliament: Gordon and Buchan
- Scottish Parliament: Aberdeenshire East

Maud (Scottish Gaelic: Am Mòd) is a village in the Buchan area of the Scottish county of Aberdeenshire. Located 13 miles (21 km) west of Peterhead on the South Ugie Water, Maud rose to prosperity in the 19th century as a railway junction of the Formartine and Buchan Railway that ran through Maud to Fraserburgh and Peterhead, but has always been the meeting place of six roads. It has had a variety of names:

- Bank of Behitch
- Brucklay
- New Maud, the New having since fallen out of use, leading to the village's current name

== The village ==
Maud features an old railway station, which closed to passengers in 1965. When the railway was active, Maud was where the railway line from Aberdeen split before heading to Fraserburgh and Peterhead. Walks can be taken along the old railway lines which now form part of the Formartine and Buchan Way; the railway tracks were removed following the ending of freight trains in 1979. There was a mart or livestock market until recently, selling local livestock. There is also a hospital for the elderly, which was formerly a poorhouse that opened in 1866, designed by Alexander Ellis.

A modern complex in the centre of the village houses a café, community centre, gym and other facilities; the old town hall, a few minutes walk from the new complex, is also still in regular use by community groups. The village also has a small parade of shops.

The hamlet of Kirkhill Pendicle to the south of Maud has a weather station which features prominently in Met Office weather maps for Aberdeenshire.

== Prehistory and archaeology ==
The local area to the immediate south is rich with prehistory and historical features. There are found a number of prehistoric monuments including Catto Long Barrow, Silver Cairn and numerous tumuli.

In 2001, archaeological work being undertaken in advance of the development of a pipeline discovered an Early Bronze Age cremation cemetery. The cemetery contained 41 pits, of which 29 contained cremated human bone, though representing 42 individuals, as multiple individuals were interred in several pits. Of those 29 burial pits, 11 of them had Collared or Cordoned Urns. The human remains were of adults and children and ranged in age from a fetus to 45+ years old. The cremations were radiocarbon dated to between 2040 and 1500 BC. A diverse range of artefacts were recovered in the graves, including a pair of Golden Eagle talons and a flint foliate knife. A large Mesolithic pit was also found in the cemetery and was dated to 4510–3970 BC. Also, several other pits from the later Neolithic and Early Bronze Age were also found.

== History ==
Catto Long Barrow is the point d'appui of a historic battle between invading Danes and the Picts.

In the era of the railway, the New Maud junction station was situated 298 feet (91 metres) above sea level, with the vicinity rail line being noted for several embankments and shallow rock cuts.

Maud's Gothic church was constructed in 1889.

== Points of interest ==
- Clackriach Castle, a 16th-century tower house

== Notable people ==
- Professor Edward Burns Ross FRSE (1881–1947), mathematician born and raised in Maud
- Jack Webster (1931–2020), journalist and author born and raised in Maud

== Bibliography ==
- McKean, Charles (1990). Banff & Buchan. Royal Incorporation of Architects in Scotland. ISBN 978-1-85158-231-0.
