= Strichen =

Village in Aberdeenshire, Scotland

Coordinates: 57.5865°N 2.0904°W

Strichen: Scottish Gaelic: Srath Fheichein
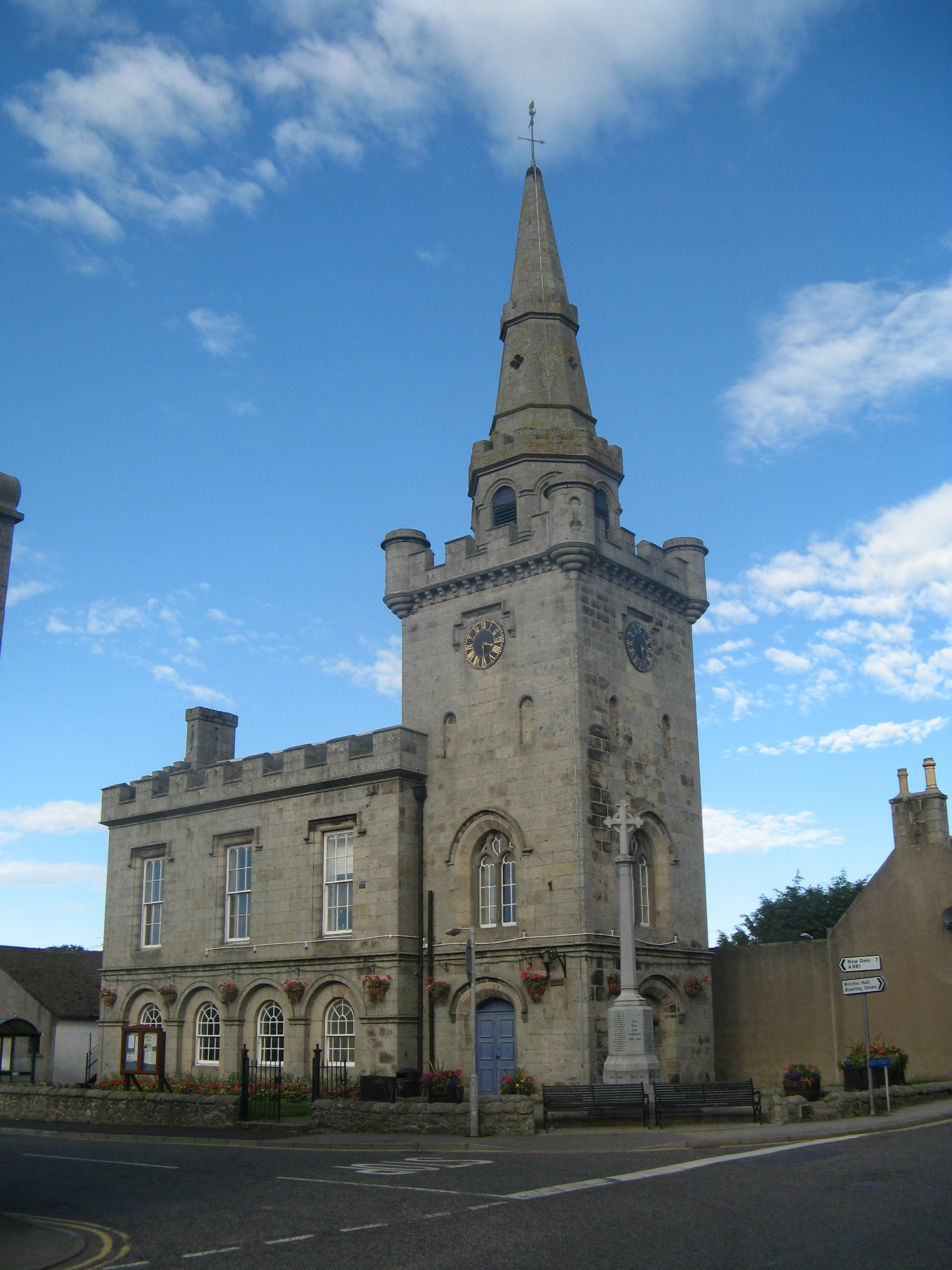
- Strichen Town House

- Location within Aberdeenshire
- Population: 940 (2020)
- OS grid reference: NJ946551
- Council area: Aberdeenshire
- Lieutenancy area: Aberdeenshire
- Country: Scotland
- Sovereign state: United Kingdom
- Post town: FRASERBURGH
- Postcode district: AB43
- Police: Scotland
- Fire: Scottish
- Ambulance: Scottish
- UK Parliament: Aberdeenshire North and Moray East
- Scottish Parliament: Aberdeenshire East

Strichen is a village in Aberdeenshire, Scotland. It sits on the A981, connecting it to New Deer 7.2 miles (12 km) to the southwest and Fraserburgh 8 miles (13 km) to the north-northeast, and the B9093, connecting it to New Pitsligo about 4 miles (6.4 km) due west. The village was founded in 1764, as the village of Mormond, by Alexander Fraser, (Lord Strichen). It is situated on the River Ugie at the foothills of Mormond Hill. The Strichen White Horse is constructed of quartz on Mormond Hill, some 1,500 m (1,600 yd) northeast of Strichen.

== History ==
There is considerable evidence of local habitation by early man in and around Strichen. Strichen Stone Circle can be found near Strichen House in publicly accessible land. Further south lies the Catto Long Barrow and a number of tumuli.

There are several listed buildings within the village. The most significant is the category A listed Strichen Town House constructed to a design by the Aberdeen architect John Smith in 1816. It is described by Historic Scotland as an "excellent example of an early 19th century castellated Town House".

Strichen House, designed in 1821 in a commission for Thomas Fraser, 12th Lord Lovat, is also by John Smith.

Strichen School was designed by Aberdeen architect Robert Gordon Wilson in 1873.

The village was formerly served by Strichen railway station on the Formartine and Buchan Railway.

== Notable residents ==
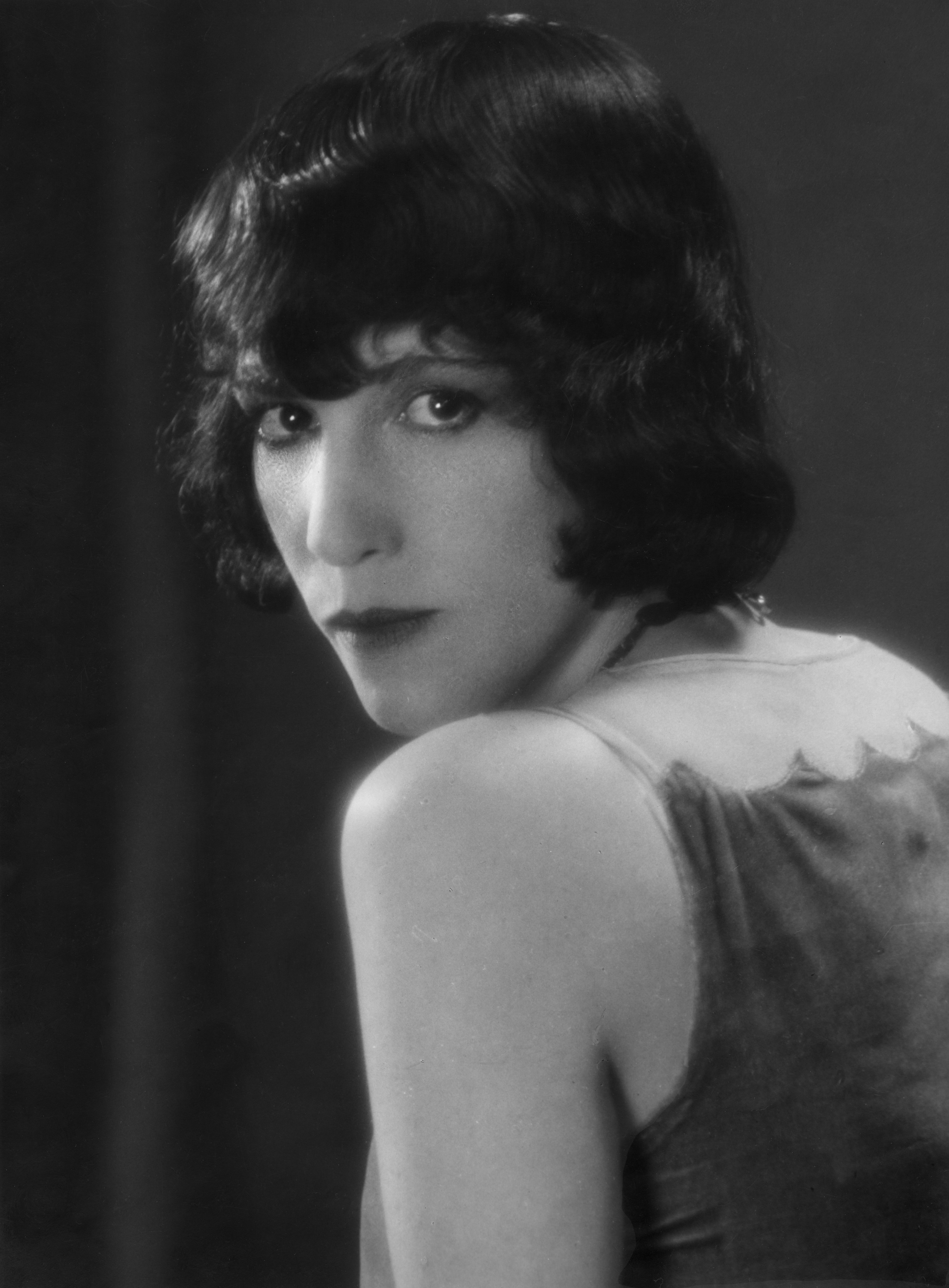
The writer Lorna Moon (1926), was born in Strichen in 1886

Twice Provost of Aberdeen, William Cruden (1726–1807), was born and raised in Strichen.

The former First Minister of Scotland, Alex Salmond, lived in a converted mill in the village with his wife Moira.

Author and screenwriter Lorna Moon was born in Strichen in 1886. Her 1925 collection of short stories Doorways in Drumorty was written when she lived in Hollywood and is based upon her memories of Strichen. Her 1929 novel Dark Star also features scenes of Strichen and Aberdeenshire.

Walter Hamböck, Hitler's former pianist, was the organist at Strichen Parish Church for much of the 1960s.

Serial killer Dennis Nilsen was brought up for part of his childhood in Strichen.

The bacteriologist Robert Cruickshank FRSE was born here.
