= Mormond Hill =

Hill in Aberdeenshire, Scotland

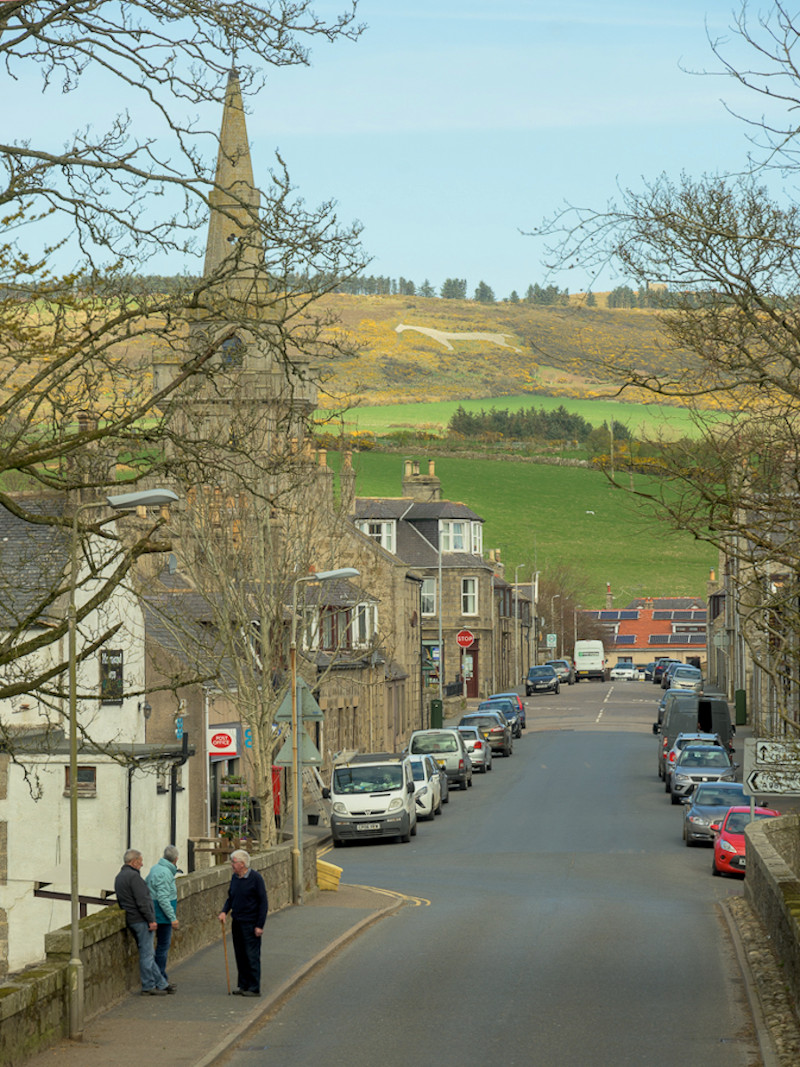
View of Mormond Hill from Strichen, showing the White Horse

Mormond Hill (from Gaelic Mórmhonadh, "big hill") is a broad eminence in Aberdeenshire, Scotland, not far from Fraserburgh. Its twin summits reach heights of 754 feet (230 m) and 767 feet (234 m); the higher of the two is known as Waughton Hill. The hill is surrounded by the low-lying arable region known as Buchan. At its foot are the villages of Strichen and New Leeds.

The hill is mentioned in the folk song "Mormond Braes", about a girl from "Strichen toon" who resolves to make a better match after her lover jilts her. It is also mentioned in the song "Farewell to Tarwathie" by Judy Collins, originally written by George Scroggie.

== History ==
St Eddren's Slack, on the eastern side of the hill, is said to have been the hermitage of Ethernan, an obscure saint who founded the church of Rathen. Before the parish of Strichen was created in the 17th century, the people of the district were obliged to travel north across the hill in order to attend services in Rathen Kirk. The dead were taken there for burial, and a heap of stones known as the Resting Cairn marks the point at which pallbearers would pause before passing over the steepest part of the hill.

Because of its prominence in the flat Buchan countryside, Mormond Hill was an important landmark for navigators. An old rhyme warns sailors to keep the hill at a constant distance so as to avoid veering too close to the dangerous rocks of Rattray Head:

Keep Mormound Hill a handspike high,
And Rattray Brigs you'll not come nigh.

The hill is the site of an 18th-century hunting lodge, now in a ruinous condition. During the Cold War it was the site of Mormond Hill Radio Station, part of the North Atlantic Radio System. The station is now used for commercial purposes.

== White Horse and White Stag ==
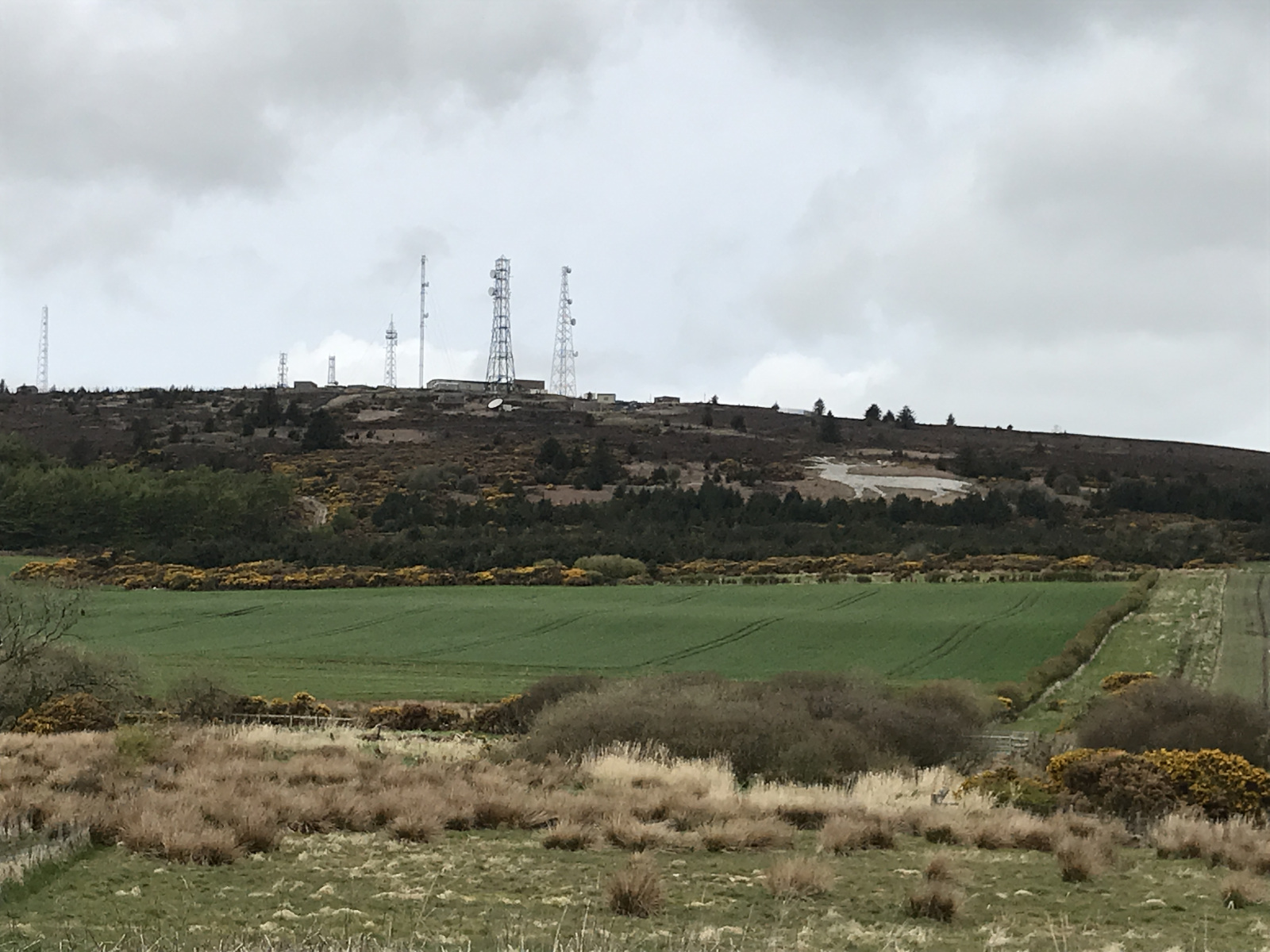
The radio station, with the White Stag below

A 126-foot (38 m) tall horse formed of quartz stones can be seen on the southwestern brow of the hill, overlooking Strichen. (Note: White Horse - 57.599906°N 2.066240°W) It is said to have been created by Captain Alexander Fraser in the late 18th century, in memory of a sergeant who gave up his horse when Fraser's was shot from under him in a skirmish in Holland in 1794 (the sergeant was killed after dismounting).

The stag, on the southeastern brow of the hill, (Note: White Stag - 57.602229°N 2.025149°W) is much larger than the horse, being 240 foot (73 m) tall. It was created in 1870 to mark the marriage of a local laird. There is some disagreement as to whether it was originally a solid figure or merely an outline. At some stage it was an outline only, but it is now solid. The stag was cleaned in 1939, 1946, 1955, 1984, 1994/95, 2006, 2018, 2023 and 2026.

The horse and stag of Mormond are notable for being Scotland's only hill figures. There are various horse figures worldwide, the most famous being the Uffington White Horse, but the stag is thought to be the only one of its kind.
