= Aden Country Park =

Country park in Aberdeenshire, Scotland

Coordinates: 57°31′19″N 2°1′47″W

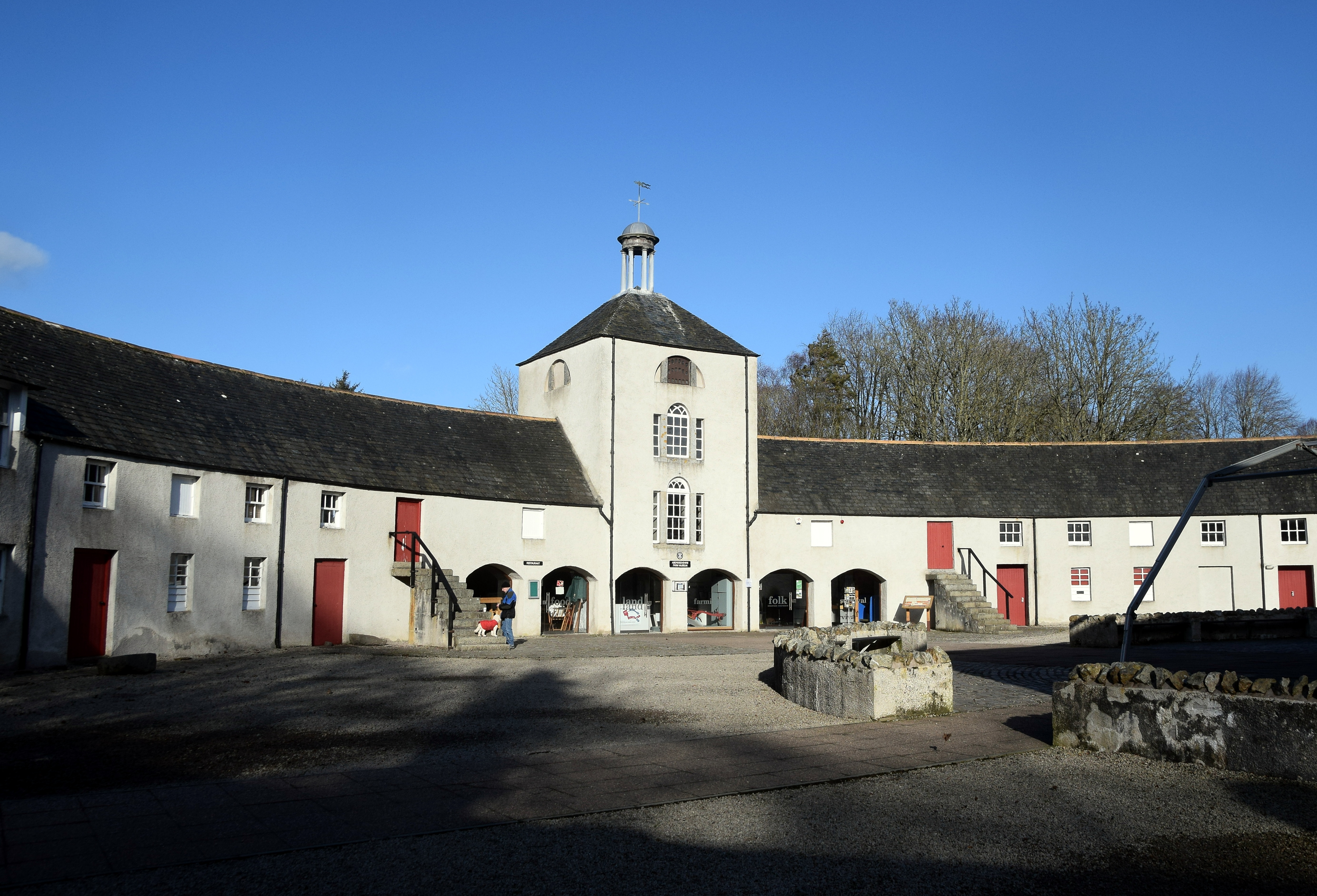
- Established: 1723
- Location: Mintlaw, Aberdeenshire, Scotland

Aden Country Park is located in Mintlaw, Aberdeenshire, Scotland, and is first mentioned in the 10th-century Book of Deer. The park contains landscaped gardens, forest walks, camping and caravan facilities, recreational areas, and the maintained ruins of Aden House. It is also home to the Aberdeenshire Farming Museum.

The park can be accessed from Mintlaw via Station Road or Nether Aden Road, and hosts an annual pipe band contest which attracts bands from across Scotland.

== Aberdeenshire Farming Museum ==
The Aberdeenshire Farming Museum comprises two main features. The early 19th-century semicircular Home Farm steading presents interpretations of life on the 20th-century Aden Estate, including through the use of costumed guides. The "Weel Vrocht Grun" (well-worked ground) contains displays on regional farming history and agricultural innovation over the last two centuries.

The Hareshowe Working Farm was moved to Aden Country Park in the early 1990s. The farmhouse has been restored to a 1950s appearance, with guided tours providing demonstrations of cooking and farm activities.

== Aden House ==
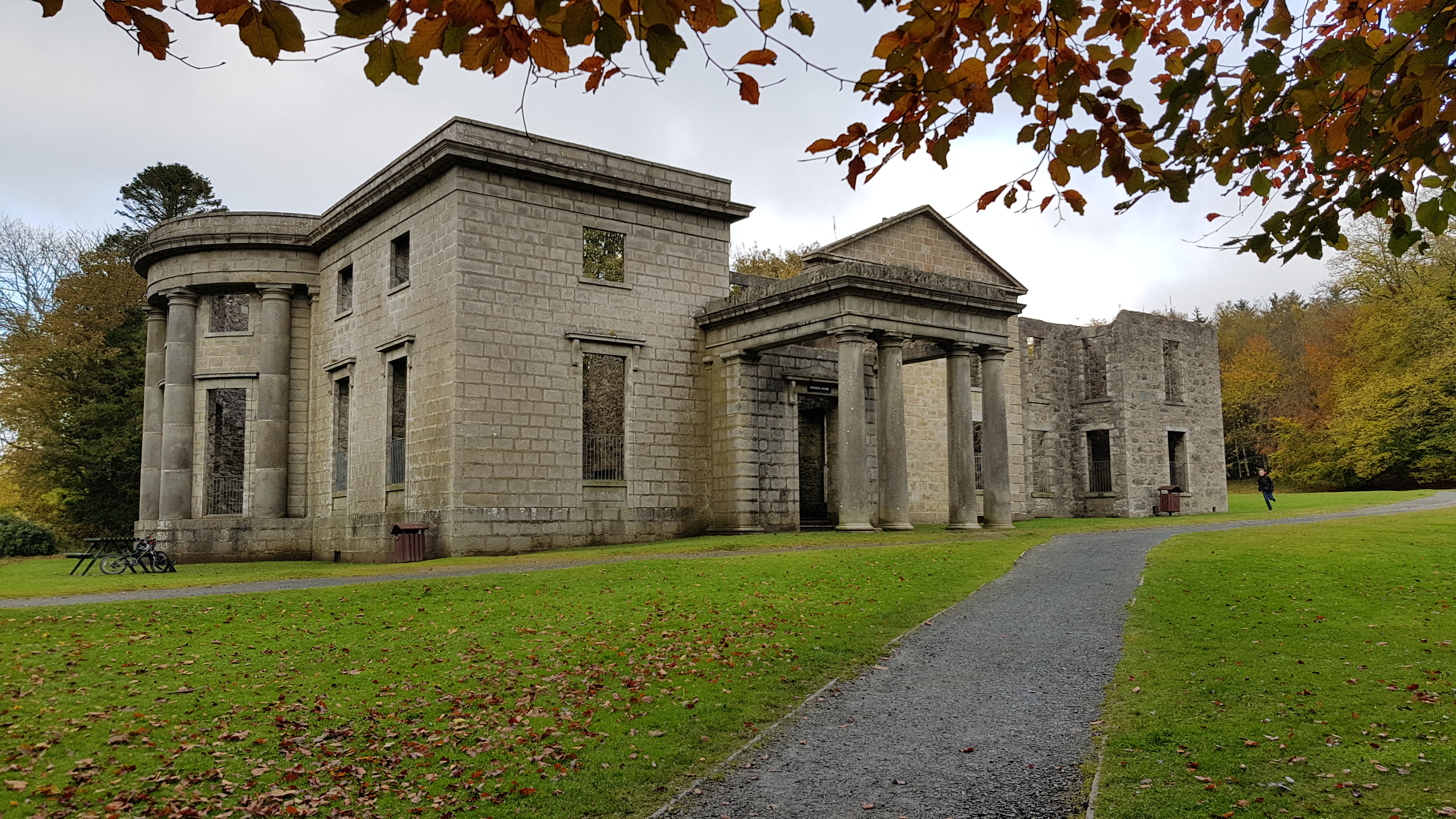
Remains of Aden House, 2020

The mansion house was originally granted to the Keith family in 1324, before passing to the Russells of Montcoffer. It was said to have been beautiful prior to its ruin. Alexander Russell of Montcoffer (1723–98) later purchased the Aden estate in 1758 from James Ferguson of Kinmundy.

John Smith reconstructed the mansion in 1832 with "a magnificent balustraded west wing and Doric-columned, domed, projecting west bow".

Alexander Russell's great-great-grandson, Sidney Russell (1895–1965), was the last Russell laird to live at Aden. He sold the estate in 1937 and moved to Dorset. The Barony of Aden is still held by the Russell family.

During World War II, it was used as an army barracks, and it is said that the interior decoration was damaged and lost its lustre during this period. After the war, the house was left to fall into ruin. As of 1990, only its outer walls remained standing.

The house is made of grey granite.

== Bibliography ==
- McKean, Charles (1990), Banff & Buchan, Royal Incorporation of Architects in Scotland, ISBN 978-1-85158-231-0
