= Peterhead railway station =

Demolished railway station in Peterhead, Aberdeenshire

Coordinates: 57.5095°N 1.7872°W

Peterhead
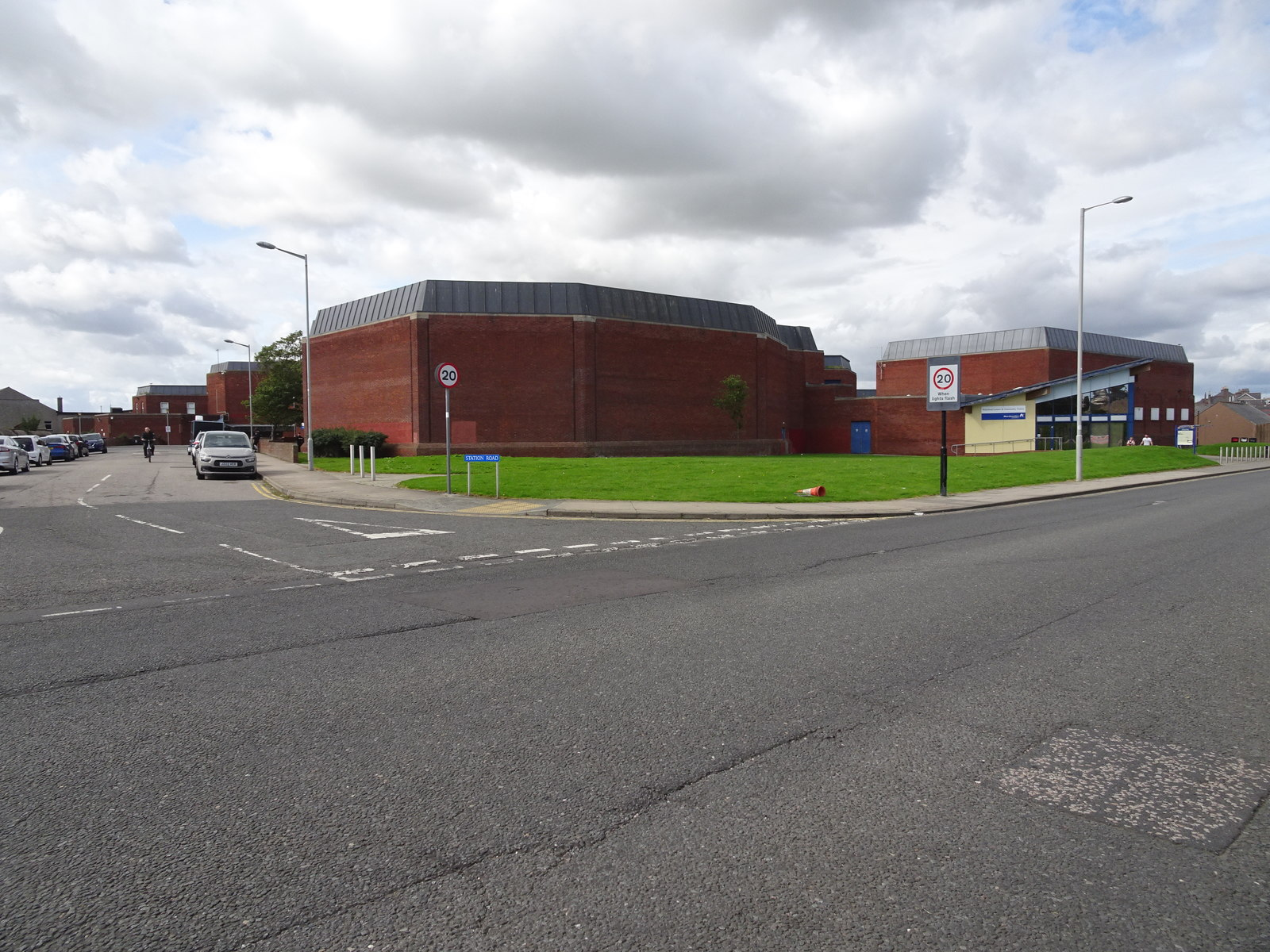
- The site of the station in 2019

General information
- Location: Peterhead, Aberdeenshire; Scotland
- Platforms: 1

Other information
- Status: Disused

History
- Original company: Formartine and Buchan Railway
- Pre-grouping: Great North of Scotland Railway
- Post-grouping: London and North Eastern Railway

Key dates
- 3 July 1862: Opened
- 3 May 1965: Closed for passengers
- 1970: Closed completely
Location

Peterhead railway station was a railway station in Peterhead, Aberdeenshire.

== History ==
The railway station was opened on 3 July 1862 by the Formartine and Buchan Railway. To the north was the goods yard, further north was a locomotive shed and to the west was the signal box, which opened in 1883 and was replaced in 1890. It was closed to passengers on 3 May 1965 and to freight in 1970. The signal box closed in 1966 and was replaced by a ground frame. The track was subsequently removed. The site is now a school.

== See also ==
- Peterhead Docks railway station

Preceding station	Disused railways	Following station
Inverugie; Line and station closed	Great North of Scotland Railway; Formartine and Buchan Railway	Terminus
