= Buchan =

Committee area of Aberdeenshire, Scotland

Coordinates: 57.52°N 2.00°W

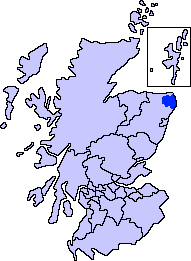
Map of Scotland showing the present-day committee area of Buchan

Buchan /ˈbʌxən/ is a coastal district in the north-east of Scotland, bounded by the Ythan and Deveron rivers. It was one of the original provinces of the Kingdom of Alba. It is now one of the six committee areas of Aberdeenshire.

== Etymology ==
The genesis of the name Buchan is shrouded in uncertainty, but may be of Pictish origin. The name may involve an equivalent of Welsh buwch meaning "a cow". American academic Thomas Clancy has noted cautiously the similarity between the territory names Buchan and Marr to those of the Welsh commotes Cantref Bychan and Cantref Mawr, meaning "small commote" and "large commote", respectively.

== History ==
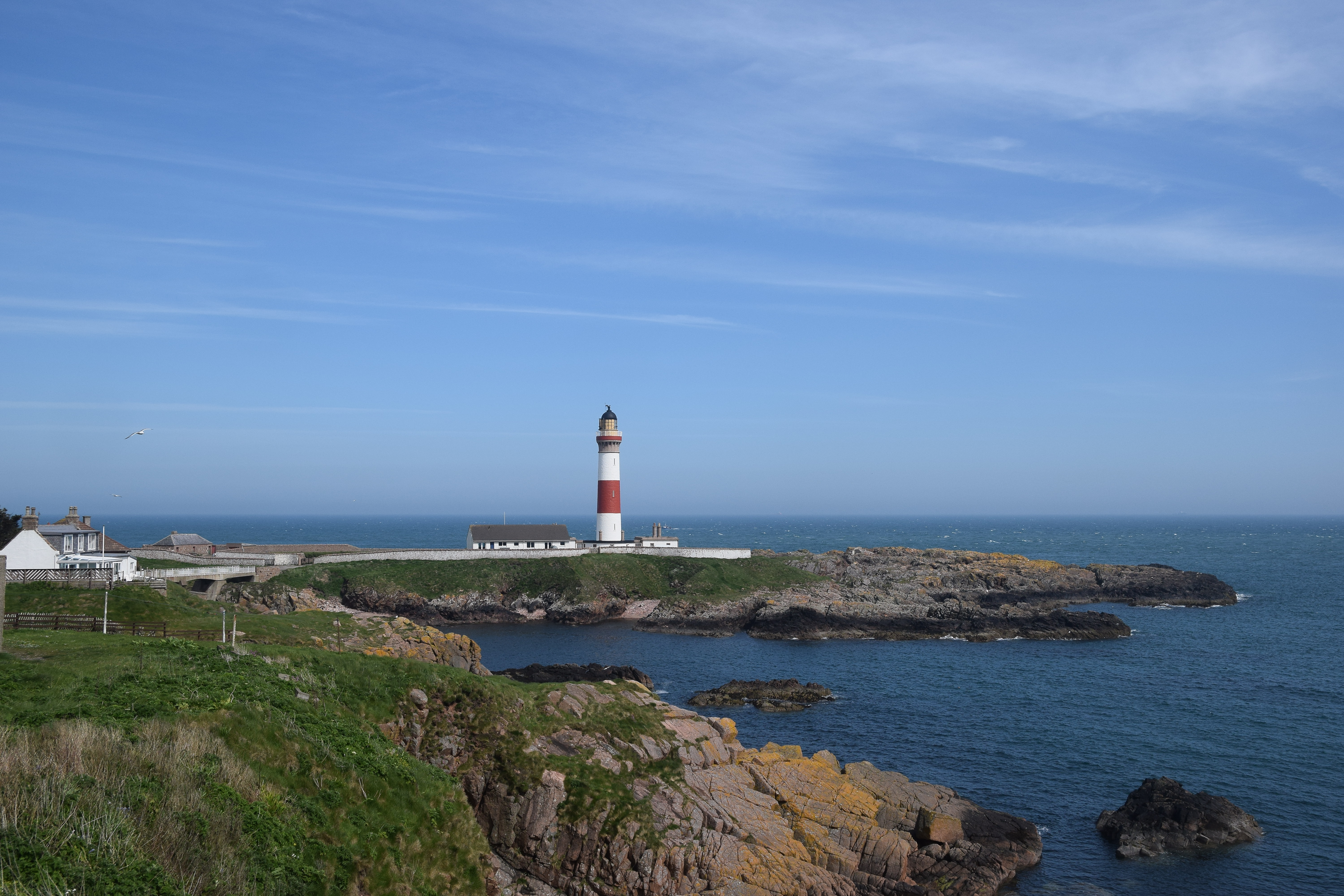
Buchan Ness, near Peterhead

The first documentary record of Buchan is a reference in the Chronicle of the Kings of Alba to the death of King Indulf at the hands of Vikings in Buchan in 962, a death separately recorded in a 12th-century king list as taking place at Cullen. Cullen is to the west of the River Deveron, in an area where the Earls of Buchan held land as late as the 13th century, suggesting that Buchan's boundaries at this time extended as far west as the River Spey.

In Pictish times, Buchan was located within the kingdom of Cé. There is considerable ancient history in this geographic area, especially slightly north-west of Cruden Bay, where the Catto Long Barrow and numerous tumuli are found.

At one time, the district of Buchan comprised all the land between the Don and Deveron, but now the land between the Don and the Ythan is known as Formartine, so Buchan has taken on a restricted sense.

== Features ==
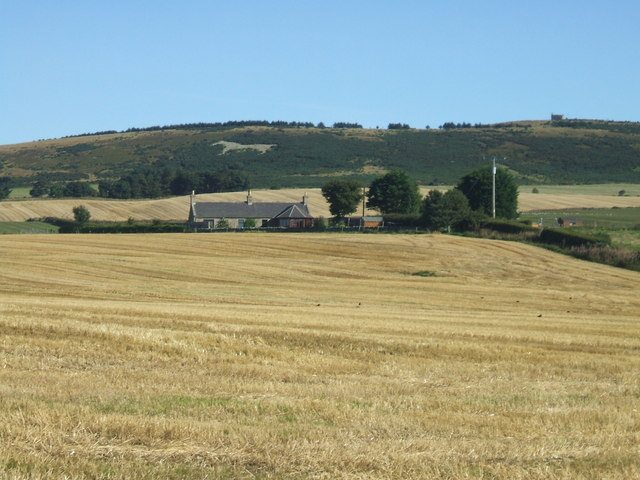
Mormond Hill, Buchan's highest point

The Buchan area has a population of 39,160 (2001 census) and an area of 547 km^{2} (211 sq mi). It contains the town of Peterhead and is adjacent to the committee and administrative areas of Banff and Buchan and Formartine.

Peterhead is the largest town in Buchan and Aberdeenshire; the principal whitefish-landing port in Europe; and a major oil industry service centre. Equally important is the nearby gas terminal at St Fergus. Remote Radar Head Buchan, an RAF air-defence radar unit, is located near Peterhead.

Attempts are being made to counter the negative effects of several recent key company closures and economic threats. Inland, the area is dependent upon agriculture, and many villages have seen a decline in population and services. Issues affecting Banff and Buchan also apply here, as does the future of the oil and gas industry. Part of Buchan benefits from EU aid coverage. Opportunities exist through the Buchan Local Action Plan to safeguard and enhance the economic future of Peterhead and Buchan.

The Formartine and Buchan Way runs through Buchan.

== Bibliography ==
- MacQueen, Hector L. (2008). "Scotland: Politics, Government and Law". In Rigby, S. H. (ed.). A Companion to Britain in the Later Middle Ages. Chichester: John Wiley & Sons. pp. 283–308. ISBN 0470998776.
- Woolf, Alex (2007). From Pictland to Alba 789–1070. Edinburgh: Edinburgh University Press. ISBN 9780748612345.
