= Formartine and Buchan Railway =

Former railway line in Scotland

Overview
- Locale: Scotland

History
- Opened: 23 July 1858
- Closed: 3 July 1966

Technical
- Line length: 57 mi (92 km)
- Track gauge: 1,435 mm (4 ft 8 1/2 in)

The Formartine and Buchan Railway was a railway company operating in the north-east of Scotland. It was built to link the important fishing ports of Fraserburgh and Peterhead with Aberdeen. It had a junction with the main line of the Great North of Scotland Railway (GNoS) at Dyce. Due to shortage of finance, the line was opened in stages as money became available. The section from Dyce to Mintlaw opened in 1861, and from there to Peterhead in 1862. The Fraserburgh line opened in 1865. The company was never profitable, and it was heavily supported financially by the GNoSR; it was formally absorbed by that company in 1866.

The area served was a good agricultural district, and farm produce supplemented the buoyant fish traffic, which included fishing boats' crews travelling home; there was some leisure business, especially connected with a golf course and hotel sponsored by the GNoSR at Cruden Bay.

Ordinary use of the line declined after 1950, although the line fared better than some others because of the poor road network at the time. Nevertheless, the passenger service was withdrawn in 1965. Notwithstanding the development of the offshore oil industry, freight train operation was discontinued to Peterhead in 1970 and to Fraserburgh in 1979. There is now no railway activity on the line.

== Promotion and authorisation ==
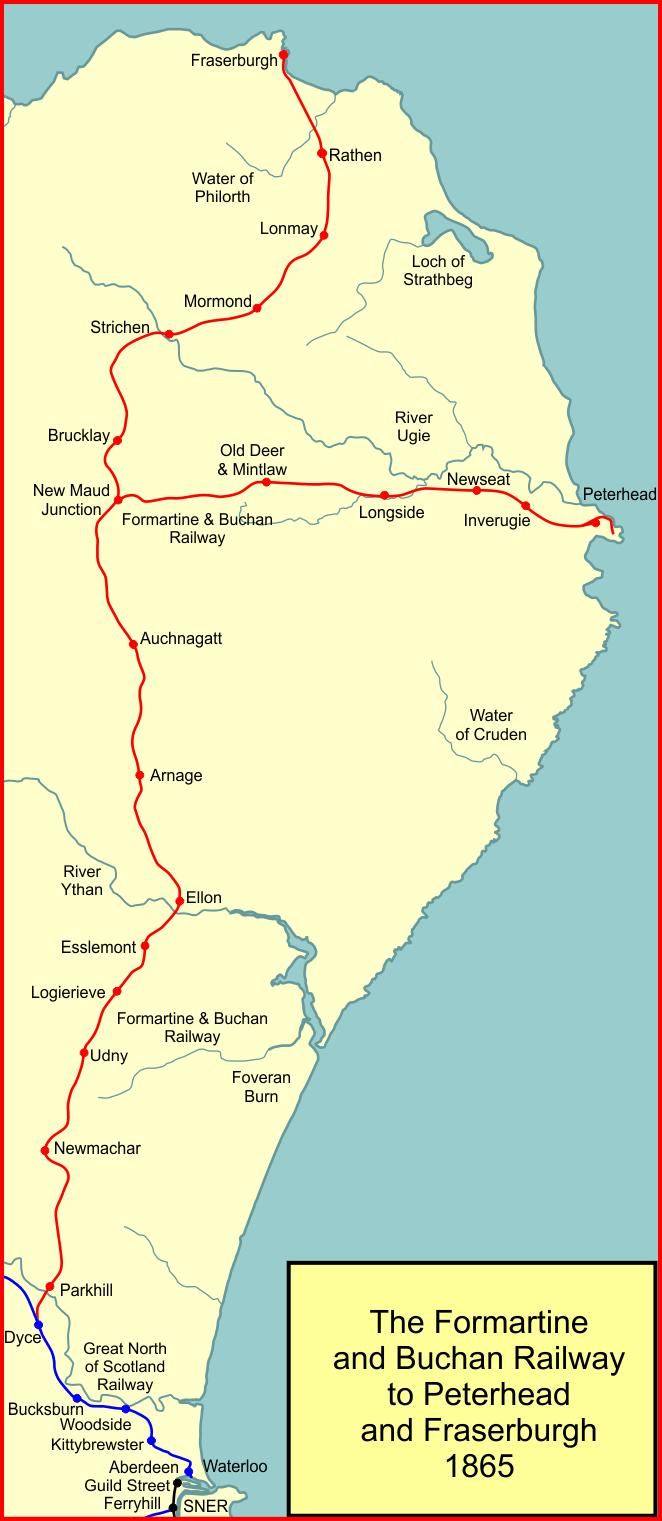
The Formartine and Buchan Railway system in 1865

A branch line to Peterhead and Fraserburgh was contemplated in 1846 but not proceeded with because of the financial collapse following the Railway Mania. The region was one of the most fertile and prosperous parts of Aberdeenshire, and the important fishing ports of Peterhead and Fraserburgh lay in the area.

Formartine and Buchan Railway Act 1858
- Act of Parliament
- Parliament of the United Kingdom
- Long title: An Act for making a Railway from the Great North of Scotland Railway to Old Deer, and thence to Peterhead and Fraserburgh, with a Branch to Ellon, all in the County of Aberdeen, to be called "The Formartine and Buchan Railway."
- Citation: 21 & 22 Vict. c. cviii

Dates
- Royal assent: 23 July 1858

The attempt to promote a railway connection was revived in 1854, and rival schemes were promoted in Parliament. After a series of struggles, the Formartine and Buchan Railway, supported by the Great North of Scotland Railway (GNoSR) was authorised by the Formartine and Buchan Railway Act 1858 (21 & 22 Vict. c. cviii) on 23 July 1858. (Note: Formartine is an ancient name for the area north of Dyce.) It was to run from the main Aberdeen to Keith line at Dyce to Fraserburgh and Peterhead, forking at Mintlaw, with a branch to Ellon. Authorised capital was to be £300,000; the parliamentary process had cost the GNoSR £25,000

The GNoSR had promised a subscription of £50,000 towards the Formartine and Buchan company; Ross comments that the company "was pouring loans and subscriptions into companies which were incapable of repaying or yielding the necessary return, and in whose accounts, prepared by the [GNoSR itself], the debts were kept concealed".

During the parliamentary process, Lord Saltoun succeeded in inserting a condition in the authorising act, requiring a station to be constructed and operated where the line was to cross the avenue leading from Cairnbulg Road to the mansion house. The station at Philorth was stipulated to be for the sole use of his lordship, his heirs and successors, who would have the right to have all passenger and goods trains stopped on request.

Formartine and Buchan Railway (Deviation) Act 1859
- Act of Parliament
- Parliament of the United Kingdom
- Long title: An Act to enable the Formartine and Buchan Railway Company to divert their Railway near Ellon, and to abandon the Branch to Ellon.
- Citation: 22 Vict. c. xii

Dates
- Royal assent: 19 April 1859

The act had indicated a branch line to serve Ellon, but it was decided that the through line could more conveniently be deviated to serve that place, obviating a separate branch, and an amending act of Parliament, the Formartine and Buchan Railway (Deviation) Act 1859 (22 Vict. c. xii) was obtained on 19 April 1859.

== Construction and opening ==
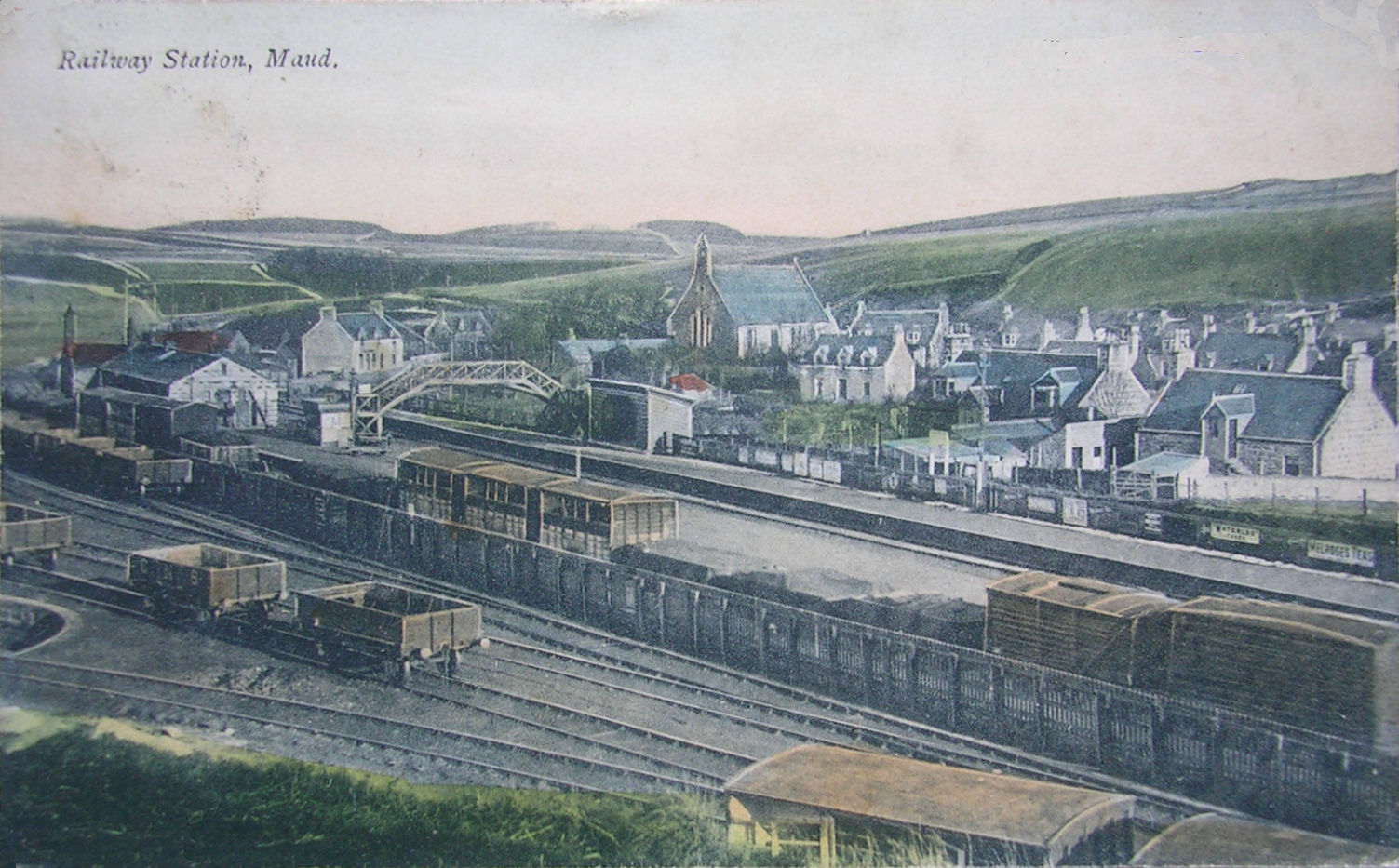
Maud station

Subscription to the share issue was very slow in coming; although the company hoped to open its line to Peterhead in the autumn of 1860, severe weather delayed the work. The bridge over the River Ythan collapsed while under construction on 3 February 1861, and the company decided to complete the line as far as a temporary terminus at Old Deer first. That section of the route was opened on 18 July 1861.

The opening of this section of the line is reported in the Aberdeen Press and Journal for 24 July 1861.

This new line - forming, probably, the most important Branch of the Great North of Scotland Railway - was opened for general traffic on Thursday. The line joins the Great North at Dyce Junction, which is distant from Aberdeen six and a half miles. The Stations on the line, and their distances from the Junction, are as follows :- Parkhill 1¼ miles; New Machar, 5¼ miles; Udny 8¼ miles; Ellon 13¼ miles; Arnage 16¾ miles; Auchnagat 20¾ miles; Brucklay 25½ miles; and Old Deer and Mintlaw Station, the present terminus, 29 miles....The two principal bridges are those over the Don and Ythan. The former of these is of three arches of 50 feet (15 m) span, the height from the surface of the water to the soffit of the centre arch being about twenty-six feet. The bridge over the Ythan is of three arches, with an additional dry arch at the south end. These arches are 60 feet (18 m) in span, and the clear height of the centre one is 45 feet (14 m). The heaviest cutting is on the north side of New Machar - it extends to about half a mile in length - and the greatest depth is 47 feet (14 m). Then on the south end of the Ythan bridge, there is a considerable cutting, the greatest depth being 27 feet (8.2 m). Directly north of Ythan there is an embankment 50 feet (15 m) in height, and then cuttings of considerable length. From Dyce to Ellon the fencing is of larch; and from Ellon to Mintlaw of wire, and, with the gates all through it is the work of Messrs Harper & Co. Aberdeen. The accommodation at the various stations is particularly good. They were erected by various tradesmen. Messrs Smith & Ramage furnished the clocks. The gradients on the line are favourable, not averaging over all higher than 1 in 150, while the steepest on the route is 1 in 75. The curves in general are easy, the quickest curve being 1 in 30 chains or three-eights of a mile; and the draining of the line is generally very complete. The engineer, we may observce, is Alexander Gibb, Esq., and Messrs Milne and Leslie are contractors. Mr. A. Stephen Wilson has been resident engineer between Dyce and Ellon; and Mr. A Fraser - now resident engineer and inspector of way on the Great North line - resident engineer between Ellon and Mintlaw.

Investment finance slowly became available, and the line through to Peterhead was opened on 3 July 1862. The GNoSR had contributed £50,000 to the construction cost of the line. The passenger terminus was some way out of the town to the north-west, and was described as being "practically in the country".

An extension three-quarters of a mile long, was opened on 9 August 1865, to enable goods trains to reach Peterhead harbour. The extension swept round the north of the town, reaching the north and south harbours from the north; the work cost £5,000, excluding land purchase.

Formartine and Buchan Railway Act 1863
- Act of Parliament
- Parliament of the United Kingdom
- Long title: An Act to authorize the Formartine and Buchan Railway Company to abandon the authorized Extension to Fraserburgh, and to make another Line instead thereof; also to make a new Road in connexion with the Peterhead Extension; and for other Purposes.
- Citation: 26 & 27 Vict. c. clxxxix

Dates
- Royal assent: 21 July 1863

Text of statute as originally enacted

Lack of subscription funds had prevented progress on the construction of the Fraserburgh branch, and in fact the company had considered abandoning it. However it decided to alter the route, branching from the Peterhead line at Brucklay (later named Maud) passing through Strichen, and keeping to the east side of Mormond Hill. This required the Formartine and Buchan Railway Act 1863 (26 & 27 Vict. c. clxxxix), passed on 21 July 1863. The branch was opened on 24 April 1865.

== Early train services ==
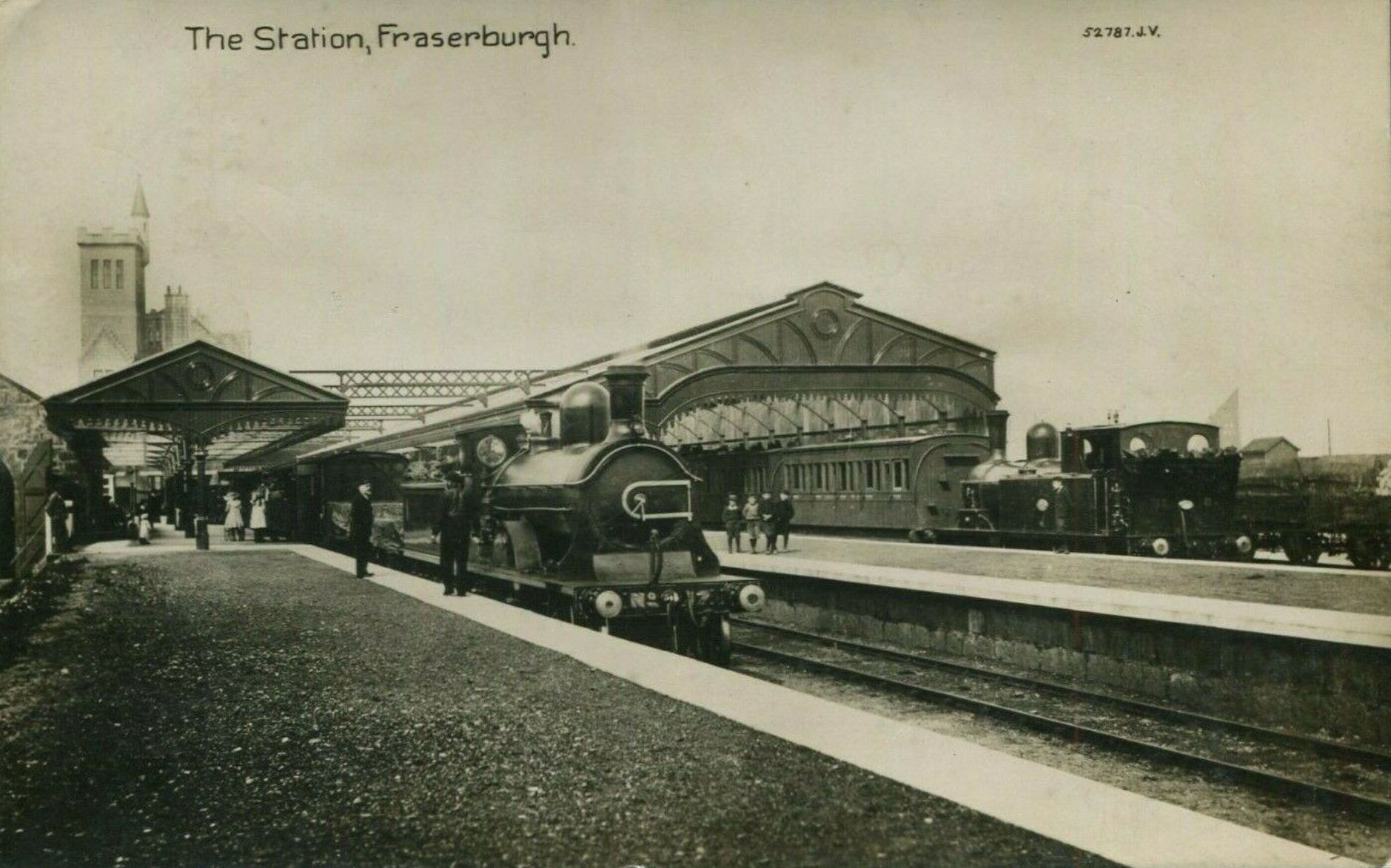
Fraserburgh station

For some time three or four services each way ran between Aberdeen and Peterhead and Fraserburgh. Stops were made at all stations, and the journey time varied from 2 1/2 to 2 3/4 hours; Peterhead and Fraserburgh portions of the trains at joined and separated at Maud. The volume of traffic was such that the main line was doubled between Kittybrewster and Dyce, this being commissioned in July 1861.

== Amalgamation ==
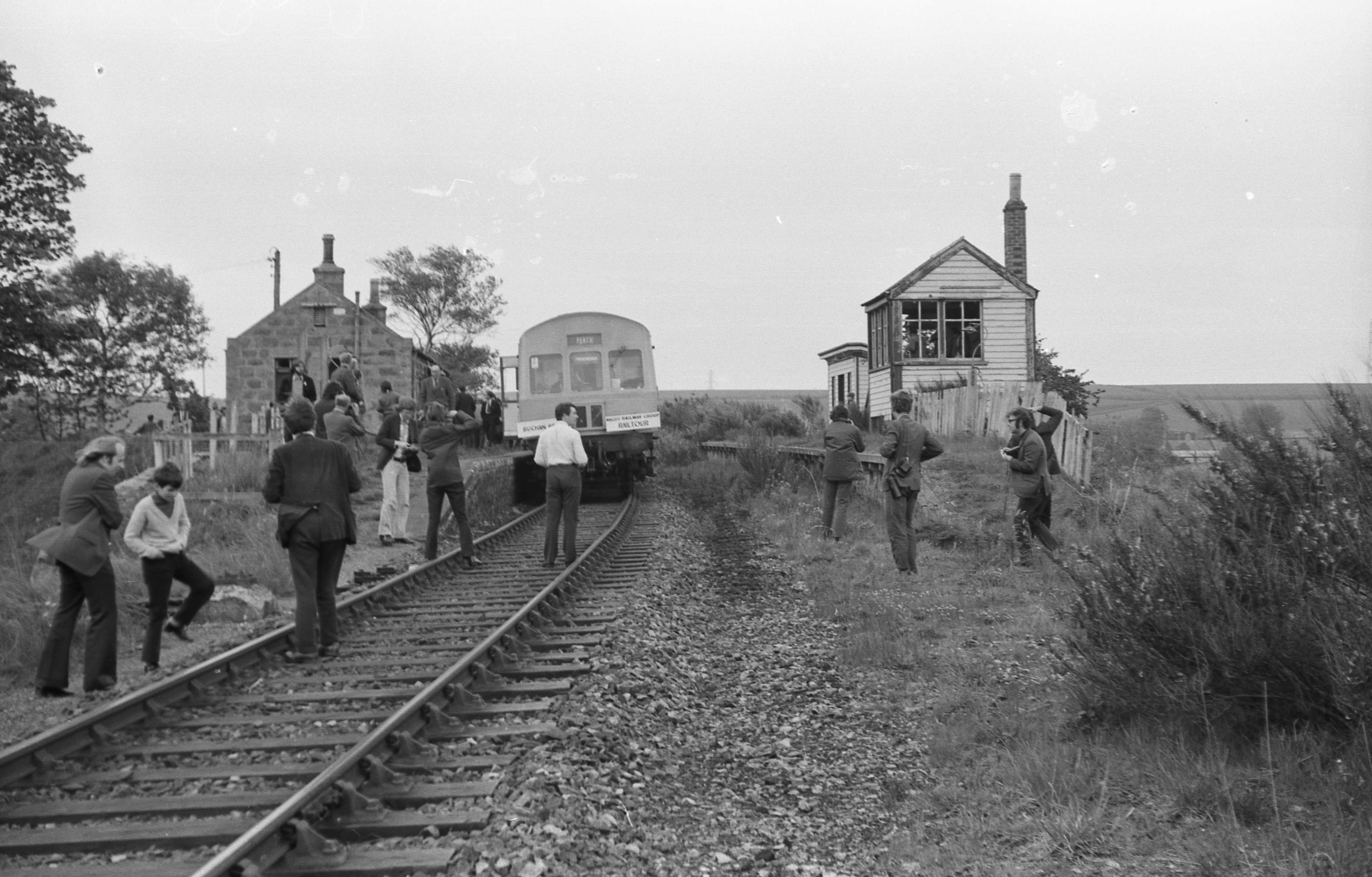
Buchan Belle railtour on 1 June 1974 at Strichen looking north

In 1865 the GNoSR operated a network of lines, but more than 75% were owned by small subsidiary companies; this arrangement was increasingly considered unsatisfactory. On 30 July 1866 the Great North of Scotland Railway (Amalgamation) Act 1866 (29 & 30 Vict. c. cclxxxviii) was passed, bringing these companies into the GNoSR. As of 30 November 1865 the Formartine and Buchan directors reported gross revenue of £25,915, expenses of £13,960, and interest charges of £7,009. The residual profit of £5,216 allowed an ordinary dividend of 1 1/4% after the 5% preference dividend. The Formartine and Buchan Railway shares had been guaranteed financially by the GNoSR, and the special GNoSR shares they now received as a result of the financial restructuring carried a corresponding guarantee.

== Peterhead Harbour of Refuge Railway ==
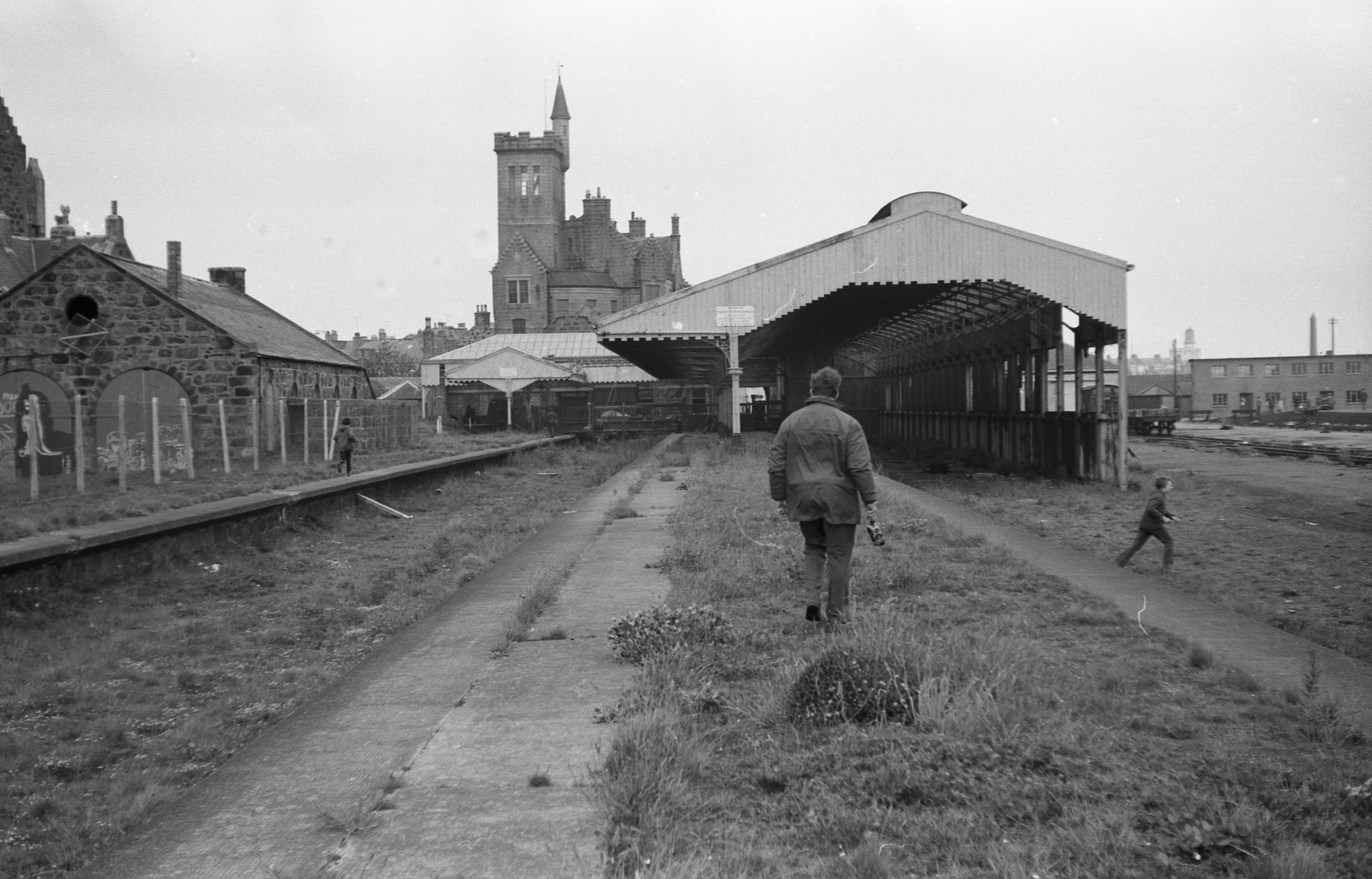
Looking along a platform at Fraserburgh towards the remains of the station buildings. The former two road locomotive shed is on the left.

In 1884 work began on a large breakwater project at Peterhead, designed to protect Peterhead Bay. Stone for the breakwater was brought from Stirling Hill, about 2 1/2 miles south of the breakwater's location, and a railway known as the Peterhead Harbour of Refuge Railway was constructed to convey the stone; it opened in 1887 or 1888, and was not commercially connected with the GNoSR. Peterhead prison opened in 1888 and from the following year convict labour was used in the quarry. The railway was properly constructed using signal boxes and the absolute block system. Prisoners were conveyed to the quarry in special passenger trains. Four Hunslet 0-6-0T locomotives were employed on the line. A second line was built on the north side of the bay in connection with the North Breakwater about 1910. The Quarry line to the South Breakwater continued in existence until the 1950s.

== Dominance of fish traffic ==
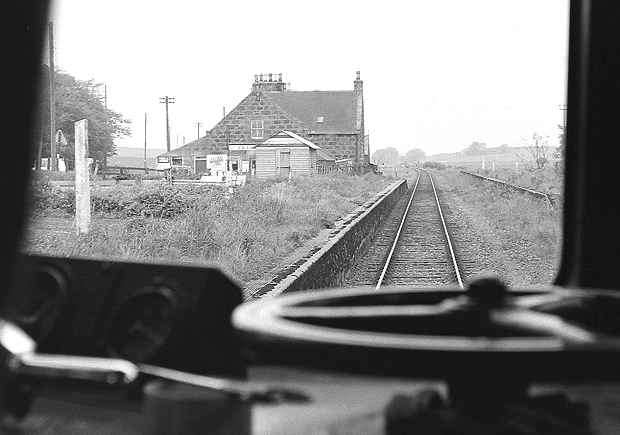
Logierieve station looking south

In the mid-1870s there was a remarkable rise of the herring catch off eastern Scotland. The number of herring boats operating from GNoSR ports increased accordingly, with 736 at Fraserburgh and 621 at Peterhead. As well as the actual fish traffic, there were a considerable number of passenger journeys of the crews travelling home.

Fish traffic to London was especially profitable, and when the 1879 fishery reports showed that Fraserburgh and Peterhead were exporting large amounts of fish to Baltic ports, the GNoSR made arrangements to charter a steamer at Aberdeen and quote the fish-sellers a through rate by rail from the Buchan ports to Aberdeen and thence to Stettin (as it was then called), undercutting the smaller vessels.

Traffic on this line was very seasonal; the herring season on the north coast was from June to August, but the season in East Anglia was later, and the crews migrated every year accordingly. Before the decline of whaling in the 1880s whale and seal oil was sent from Peterhead to Dundee for use in the jute industry.

The London fish traffic was also prominent, particularly during the war years when it was necessary to minimise coastal The cattle market in Maud was exceptionally busy and generated much traffic in the transport of cattle to southern markets.

Acworth, writing in 1890, described the traffic of the line:

Fraserburgh probably does not see a dozen tourists in a twelvemonth. Fraserburgh subsists mainly on herrings; Peterhead has two additional strings to its bow, whales and convicts. The convicts are occupied in constructing a harbour of refuge, a mile or so south of the town, a job that, from what I saw of the obstinacy of Peterhead granite, is likely to last them for some time to come. As for the whales, according to all precedent, they ought to come to Peterhead ships to be killed. But of late years they have shown an increasing disinclination to do so. In the last five years the value of the produce of the whale-fishing, taking Peterhead and Dundee together, has declined steadily and continuously from £88,000 in 1884 to £12,000 in 1888.

Acworth described how the fish traffic was actually worked:

The fishing fleet gets in, say to Peterhead and Fraserburgh, at nine o'clock in the morning. The fish are sorted out on the quay, sold by auction, packed and sent up to the station. They are loaded instantly upon trucks, and by one o'clock an engine starts from each place with perhaps 20 tons of fish. A dozen miles off at Maud Junction, the two trains of, say, 15 trucks are united, and thence they are run away straight for the markets of the south: a special train for 600 miles at express speed throughout. It will probably be a week before the empty trucks get home again. To show the solicitude with which the fish traffic is watched over, let me narrate a personal experience. I left Peterhead for London one day last spring by the 2.45 p.m. train. A few miles outside Aberdeen we were stopped, and learnt that the fish special, which had started in front of us, had broken down. Matters were, how ever, soon put right· the fish train and the passenger tram were amalgamated and we ended in reaching Aberdeen only about 20 minutes late. Meeting there the superintendent of the line, who was on the look-out for our arrival, I expressed regret that the London express would be delayed. "Oh never mind the express," was his reply, "what I want to do is get the fish special away to Perth in front of you."

== Brucklay collision, 1889 ==
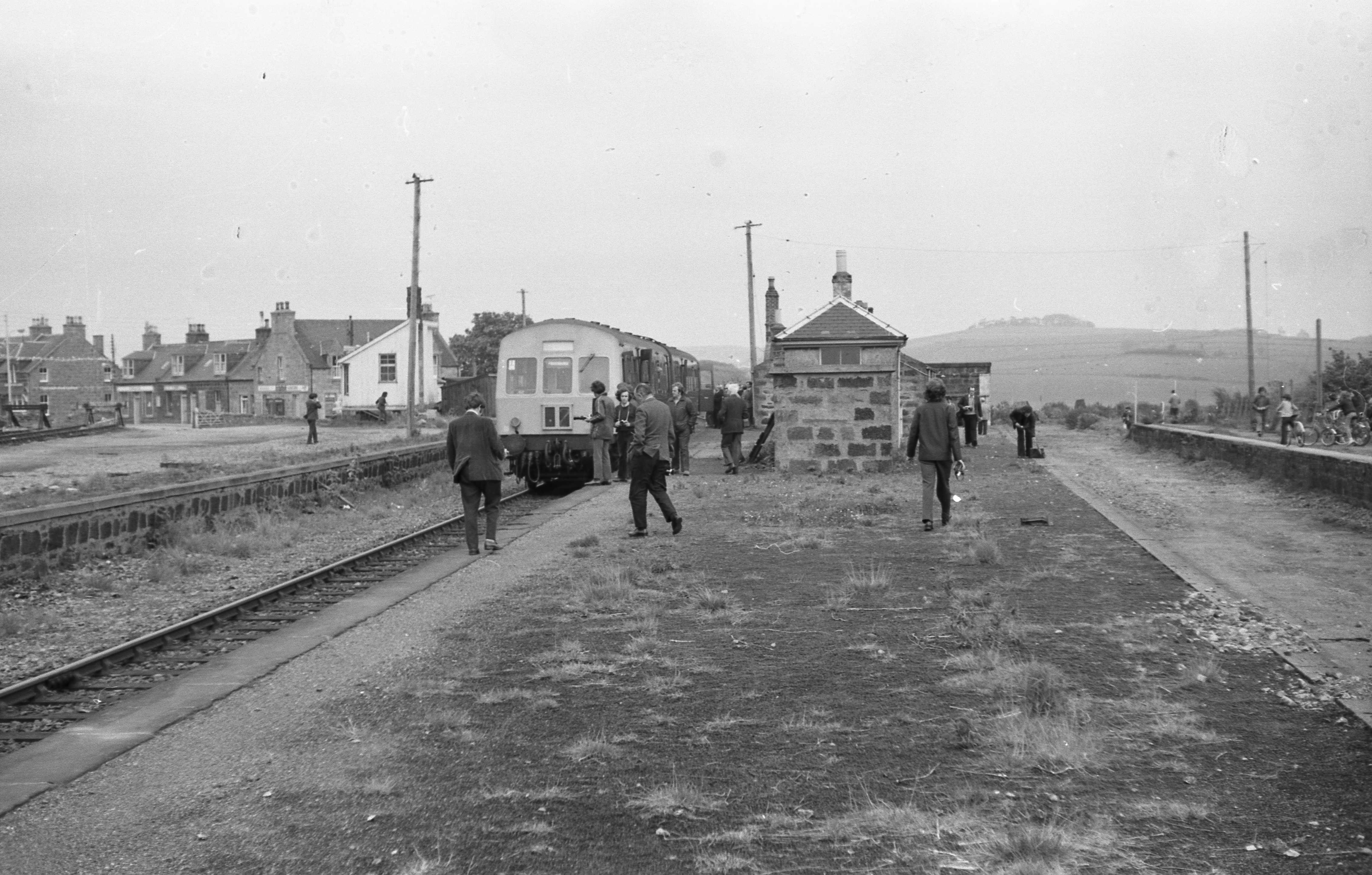
Buchan Belle railtour on 1 June 1974 at Maud station with the line to Fraserburgh on the left and the trackbed to Peterhead on the right

On 25 July 1889, a train was approaching Brucklay; it was called on into the station by a pointsman waving a white flag, but the points were set for sidings and the train ran into the siding, colliding with stationary vehicles. A cartage driver in the goods yard was killed and seven passengers in the train and the guard were injured. The points were not interlocked with the signalling, and the distant signal was improperly at clear.

Colonel Rich of the Board of Trade found that the immediate cause was that the young and inexperienced pointsman called the train on with his flag, but Rich said that

All the circumstances connected with this collision point to gross neglect on the part of the Company.

1st. There is a single line which is worked without a train staff or train tablet.
2nd. There are facing-points on the passenger line which are not interlocked with the signals, although this is absolutely necessary to provide for safe running, and the system of interlocking has been in use for 30 years.
3rd. A young and inexperienced man was employed to work the points.

I recommend that all these deficiencies should be altered without further delay."

== Branches ==
=== Boddam branch line ===
In 1897 the GNoSR opened a branch line to the small fishing port of Boddam, where there was also a quarry. A significant part of the purpose of the branch line was to serve a new luxury resort hotel the GnoSR was building, the Cruden Bay Hotel. It was associated with a new golf course; the branch joined the Buchan lines at Ellon. There was a protest from certain members of the community when the railway company started offering cheap Sunday fares to golfers who were attracted to the new course which had opened at Cruden Bay. It was felt that these golfers were desecrating the sabbath. The hotel never achieved its commercial objective, and the traditional branch line business also failed to develop as hoped. The passenger service on the line was discontinued in 1932, and the hotel was requisitioned by the military early in World War II, and never reopened. Goods traffic continued for a brief period, but the branch closed completely on 31 December 1948.

=== St Combs branch line ===
On 1 July 1903 a short branch from Fraserburgh to St Combs was opened. Its purpose was to serve the small ports of Inverallochy and St Combs, but more particularly the luxury resort hotel and golf course planned by the GNoSR at Cruden Bay. The hotel and the entire branch line was a financial failure, and the passenger service on the line was discontinued from 31 October 1932. The hotel continued in use until 1940 when it was requisitioned by the military; after World War II it never re-opened, and was demolished. The good service on the line was terminated on 31 October 1948.

== The twentieth century to 1947 ==
In 1914 extensions to the harbour facilities at Peterhead resulted in the shortening of the harbour branch, which by that time had become little used. It was cut back to a terminus at Roanheads, on the edge of the docks. There was a boom in the herring fishing industry in the 1930s requiring enlargements at the port, and there were further removals. The track was lifted right up to the passenger station after nationalisation.

During World War I Peterhead Harbour was used for bunkering mine sweepers and other vessels. For this purpose the Buchan line conveyed over 88,000 tons of coal to the port.

In addition, the Admiralty had established an Airship Station, RNAS Longside, at Lenabo about 3 1/2 miles from Longside Station; the on-site complement was about 500. The GNoSR built a line to it to help in its construction and supply, in 1916. (Note: Barclay-Harvey; Ross says "late in the war" and quotes mid-1918, but this seems to be a mistake.) The branch line carried a total of 31,913 tons of war material, chiefly coal, for the gas works on the site. The RNAS was created specifically for spotting U-boats, as auxiliaries to the fleet at Peterhead.

The branch was used for passenger as well as goods traffic. Passenger traffic comprised drafts of naval ratings who were sometimes accommodated in through carriages off south trains at Aberdeen or changed into the 'Lenabo Special' (usually a single coach), which often had attached vans and trucks containing supplies.

After the war the branch line was closed in 1920 and lifted in 1923.

In 1923 the GNoSR was incorporated into the London and North Eastern Railway (LNER) under the Railways Act 1921.

== British Railways, and closure ==
In 1948 the LNER was taken into national ownership, as part of British Railways. At first relatively little changed, except for the introduction of diesel multiple unit passenger trains in June 1959. However the transfer of traffic to the roads, which had been evident before the war, accelerated now, as widespread road improvement schemes were implemented in the early 1960s. Financial losses grew considerably. Eventually this situation was considered unsustainable, and passenger services were withdrawn between Maud and Peterhead on 3 May 1965, followed by the closure of freight services on that line on 7 September 1970. The Dyce to Fraserburgh section closed to passengers on 4 October 1965, and to freight on 6 October 1979.

As on other branches much of the staple traffic was diverted to the roads but the final closure of the Buchan line in 1979 took place against a background of considerable traffic in fertiliser, and pipes for offshore gas pipelines. Such traffic was subsequently taken by road from Inverurie.

The track was subsequently lifted and much of the route now forms the Formartine and Buchan Way, a long-distance footpath and cycle path.

== Campaign for reopening ==
A group called Campaign for North East Rail was launched in April 2021, and is campaigning for the reopening of parts of the Buchan line, although with substantial sections of completely new route. However the proposed scheme has been left out of the Scottish Government's latest Strategic Transport Projects Review (STPR2).

In September 2023, the Campaign for North East Rail was awarded £250,000 by the Scottish government to conduct a Sustainable Transport Study into rail links to Peterhead and Fraserburgh.

== Locations ==
=== Dyce to Peterhead ===
- Dyce; station on GNoSR main line; opened 20 September 1854; closed 6 May 1968;
- Park Hill; opened 18 July 1861; renamed Parkhill 3 April 1950; closed 3 April 1950;
- New Machar; opened 18 July 1861; renamed Newmachar 1904; closed 4 October 1965;
- Udny; opened 18 July 1861; closed 4 October 1965;
- Newburgh Road; opened 18 July 1861; renamed Logierieve 1862; closed 4 October 1965;
- Esslemont; opened 18 July 1861; closed 15 September 1952;
- Ellon; opened 18 July 1861; closed 4 October 1965; junction for Boddam branch;
- Arnage; opened 18 July 1861; closed 4 October 1965;
- Auchnagatt; opened 18 July 1861; closed 4 October 1965;
- Brucklay; opened 18 July 1861; renamed New Maud Junction 24 April 1865; renamed Maud Junction 1866; renamed Maud 21 September 1925; closed 4 October 1965; junction for Fraserburgh line;
- Abbey of Deer; special platform for pilgrimages, opened 17 July 1932; probable last use 2 July 1939;
- Old Deer & Mintlaw; opened 18 July 1861; renamed Mintlaw 1 December 1867; closed 3 May 1965;
- Longside; opened 3 July 1862; closed 3 May 1965;
- New Seat; opened 3 July 1862; renamed Newseat 1884; closed 3 May 1965;
- Inverugie; opened 3 July 1862; closed 3 May 1965;
- Peterhead; opened 3 July 1862; closed 3 May 1965;
- Peterhead docks.

=== Maud to Fraserburgh ===
- Brucklay (Maud); above;
- Strichen; opened 24 April 1865; closed 4 October 1965;
- Mormond; opened 24 April 1865; closed 4 October 1965;
- Lonmay; opened 24 April 1865; closed 4 October 1965;
- Rathen; opened 24 April 1865; closed 4 October 1965;
- Philorth; opened privately for Saltoun House 24 April 1865; public 26 July 1926; closed 4 October 1965;
- Philorth Bridge; opened 1 July 1903; closed 3 May 1965;
- Fraserburgh; opened 24 April 1865; closed 4 October 1965; connection to Fraserburgh and St Combs Light Railway.
