= Pitfour =

Pitfour may refer to:

- Pitfour estate, Aberdeenshire, Scotland, seat of the Fergusons of Pitfour
- Pitfour Castle, Perth and Kinross, Scotland
- James Ferguson, 1st Laird of Pitfour (1672-1734), Scottish lawyer
- James Ferguson, Lord Pitfour (1700–1777), Scottish advocate, 2nd Laird
- James Ferguson (Scottish politician) (1735-1820), Scottish advocate and politician, 3rd Laird
- George Ferguson (Lt Governor of Tobago) (1748-1820), 4th Laird
