= James Ferguson of Pitfour =

James Ferguson of Pitfour may refer to:

- James Ferguson, 1st Laird of Pitfour (1672–1734), Scottish lawyer
- James Ferguson, Lord Pitfour (1700–1777), Scottish advocate
- James Ferguson (Scottish politician) (1735–1820), Scottish advocate and Tory politician
