= George Ferguson (colonial administrator) =

British colonial administrator (1748–1820)

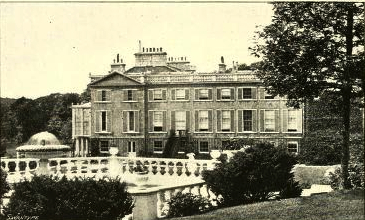
A side view of Pitfour House, c. late 19th century

George Ferguson (1748 – 29 December 1820) was the fourth Laird of Pitfour, a large estate in the Buchan area of Aberdeenshire, Scotland, that became known as The Blenheim of the North.

He lived much of his life in Tobago and became lieutenant governor in 1779. He surrendered the island to the French after a battle in 1781. Accusations were made by the commander of the British Fleet that the island was surrendered too easily but Ferguson was cleared of any blame at a subsequent enquiry. He is usually referred to as the "Governor" to help differentiate between the generations, as men of the next generations were also named George Ferguson.

Ferguson was only Laird of Pitfour for about three months before his sizeable estate, including the plantations in the Caribbean, passed to his illegitimate son.

== Early life and family ==
Ferguson was born at Pitfour in the Buchan area of Aberdeenshire in the north east of Scotland in 1748. His father was James Ferguson who had been raised to the bench in 1764 becoming Lord Pitfour. His mother was Anne Murray (1708–1793) who was a sister of Patrick Murray, 5th Lord Elibank and James Murray a British Army officer who became Governor of Quebec. He had two older brothers, the eldest James (1736–1820) who became a politician and was the third Laird of Pitfour; and Patrick (1744–1780) who invented the Ferguson rifle, which was a breech-loading flintlock weapon. He also had three sisters, named Ann, Elizabeth and Jane.

Ferguson was not healthy as a child and his sister wrote this description of him: "George, who is going on fourteen, has been tender, has more genious than application with a heart as warm and honest as you could wish". His older brother Patrick referred to him as "little man monster".

== Tobago ==
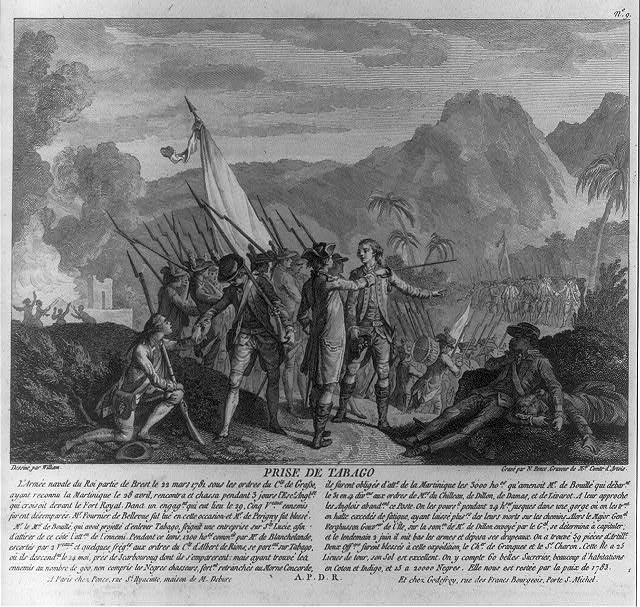
A painting from 1784 depicting the French attack on the British island of Tobago in 1781 when Ferguson was governor.

In 1770 his older brother Patrick purchased the Castara estate in Tobago. Ferguson subsequently went to Tobago in the early 1770s and managed the estate on his brother's behalf.

He developed it into a successful enterprise and exports of rum, sugar and molasses were made back to the UK from the estate. Ferguson purchased land in Tobago himself in 1778 and later, after he inherited the Castara estate on Patrick's death, he became one of the most important landowners on the island. An exceptional income was made from the sugar plantation and a large workforce of slaves was used.

In 1779, when Ferguson was in his early thirties, he was designated Lieutenant Governor of Tobago; he is generally referred to as the "Governor" to differentiate from following generations, a reflection of this position.

Britain had secured the island of Tobago as one of its colonies in 1762 and this was confirmed at the end of the Seven Years' War in 1763. However, on 23 May 1781 a fleet of nine French ships under the command of viscount de Blanchelande arrived to re-capture the island for the French. The first landing was unsuccessful due to inclement weather but 3000 men were landed the next day on the west coast of the island, near Plymouth. Ferguson held out until the French troops began to burn the sugar plantations but he eventually surrendered on 2 June.

The Governor returned to Britain with Major Henry Fitzroy Stanhope, who was a son of the British politician the 2nd Earl of Harrington. Stanhope had commanded the troops on Tobago. Admiral Rodney had been in command of the British fleet overseeing the Invasion of Tobago and he levelled accusations against Stanhope and the Governor stating the island had been surrendered too easily. These accusations were emphatically denied. An official enquiry was launched into the Governor's actions during the battle and Stanhope faced a court martial. After the trial in June 1783 Stanhope was acquitted. The Governor was also cleared of any blame by the enquiry.

== Later life ==
Although the Governor had returned to Britain, the generous terms of the surrender allowed him to retain ownership of all his property on the island, including a considerable number of slaves.

The Governor was based in Jermyn Street, London for a short period around October 1781 as he sent a letter to The London Gazette vigorously denying the charges Admiral Rodney was trying to lay against him. He then lived with his older brother James at 333 High Street, Edinburgh.

The Scottish author Robert Chambers is reported to have written about the two brothers living at the High Street: "Don's Closes, in the Luckenbooths, and bearing the number 333, stands a land of no great antiquity or peculiar appearance, but remarkable for containing the house of Lord Pitfour, whose two sons continued to reside in it till their deaths in 1820... This is remarkable for having been the last house in the old town inhabited by a gentleman of fortune and figure..." Chambers then goes on to describe the many differences between the two stating James was "remarkably fat" whereas his brother was "tall, slim, erect, and nimble".

The Governor never married although he was said to enjoy entertaining. He had an illegitimate son, also named George who was born in April 1788 and a daughter born a year or so later named Isabella. The mother of the children was never identified but it was generally accepted she was a married woman of some standing in Edinburgh.

The Governor still continued to buy estates in the Caribbean and when the islands of Trinidad and Tobago returned to British sovereignty after the French Revolution in 1793 he returned to Tobago. He returned to Britain in 1810 leaving his extensive estates on the islands under the management of factors. Despite the decline of the sugar trade, the estates still provided the Governor with a considerable income.

== Pitfour ==
The Pitfour estate in the Buchan area of north east Aberdeenshire, Scotland had been purchased in 1700 by the first Laird, the Governor's grandfather. The first Laird had extended the lands owned and it had been expanded even further by the second Laird, Lord Pitfour. By the time the Governor returned to Britain, his older brother James had inherited the estate and was the third Laird. He had also carried out extensive work and re-modelling on the estate including constructing an artificial lake. The estate was described by Charles McKean as 'The Blenheim of Buchan' but it has also been referred to as 'The Blenheim of the North' and 'The Ascot of the North'.

The Governor divided his time between the family property in Edinburgh and his brother's mansion at Pitfour after his final return to Britain in 1810 and helped his brother with the continued development of the estate and its policies.

The third Laird died unmarried and childless in September 1820. Despite being a solicitor, no will had been drawn up. Normally the estate would have passed to Patrick who was the younger brother of the third Laird and older brother of the Governor; however, Patrick had been killed in action in 1780 and was also a childless bachelor. Although the Governor was terminally ill and in his seventies, he became the fourth Laird of Pitfour and the estate passed to him in the autumn of 1820.

== Death and legacy ==
Scottish law in the early 19th century was very strict about the sequence of inheritance and particularly as the Governor was elderly and in very poor health, he had to act quickly to ensure his illegitimate son could inherit his valuable estate and assets. If the confines of the law could not be met, the properties would all pass to the descendants of James Ferguson who owned the Kinmundy estate, which was adjacent to the lands of Pitfour.

The law stated the Governor would have to survive for 60 days after he made his will for his illegitimate son to inherit; a further legal condition was that he had to be seen walking in public. On 17 October 1820 the legal declaration was prepared and it was signed by the Governor and two witnesses less than a week later on 23 October 1820. Within a few days he was seen walking through Edinburgh to St Giles Cathedral from the house in the High Street to further comply with the legal requirements.

The Governor died at Pitfour on 29 December 1820 and during mid January 1821 he was the last of the family to be buried in the family vault at Greyfriars Kirkyard, Edinburgh.

The inheritance which then passed to his illegitimate son came to a phenomenal amount as it was assessed to be comparable to £30,000,000 in 2008. It included the extensive lands of Pitfour, which by that time stretched to over 30,000 acres, as well as all properties, sugar plantations and slaves in Trinidad and Tobago. This was received with great chagrin by the neighbouring Kinmundy line of Fergusons, especially as the Governor's son was already heavily in debt at the time of his inheritance."

Despite inheriting such a large and valuable estate, the extravagant lifestyle of the Governor's son, who had been described by the neighbouring landowners as: "the upstart spawn of an Edinburgh strumpet", the fifth Laird and his son after him, decimated the wealth built up by the first four generations; this resulted in the downfall and ruin of one of the largest estates in north east Scotland.

Government offices
| Preceded by John Graham | Lieutenant Governor of Tobago; 1781 | Succeeded by Philibert Francois Rouxel de Blanchelande |
