= Deer Abbey =

Ruins in Aberdeenshire, Scotland

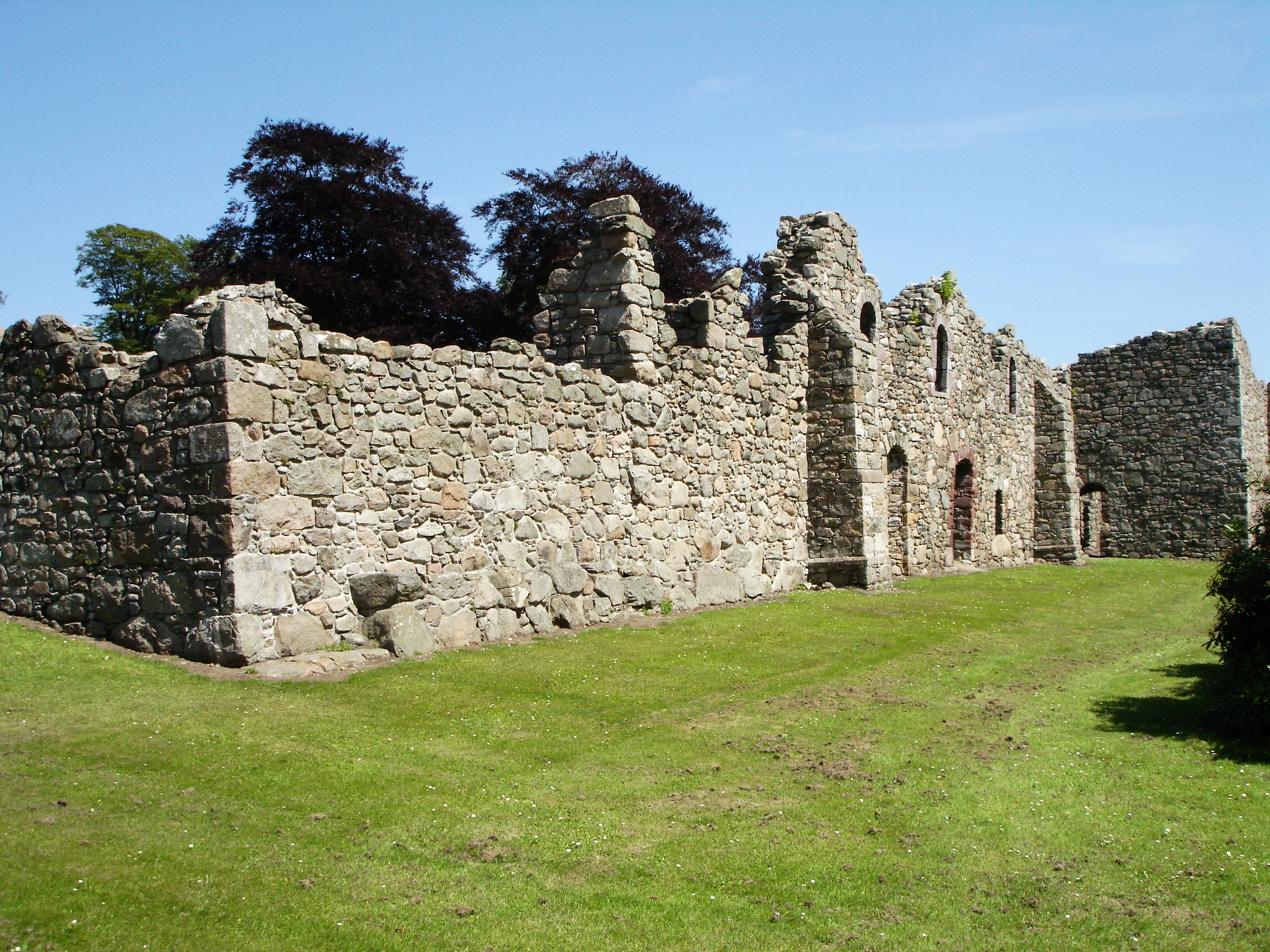
- Deer Abbey ruins in 2006
- Interactive map of Deer Abbey

Monastery information
- Order: Cistercian
- Established: 1219
- Disestablished: 1587
- Mother house: Kinloss Abbey
- Diocese: Diocese of Aberdeen
- Controlled churches: Deer; Foveran; Kinedward; Peterugie

People
- Founder: William Comyn, Earl of Buchan

Site
- Coordinates: 57.523305°N 2.0540304°W

Scheduled monument
- Official name: Deer Abbey
- Type: Ecclesiastical: abbey
- Designated: 6 February 1996
- Reference no.: SM90093

Deer Abbey was a Cistercian monastery in Buchan, Scotland. It was founded by 1219 under the patronage William Comyn, jure uxoris Earl of Buchan, who is also buried there.

== History ==
There was an earlier community of Scottish monks or priests, never numbering more than fifteen. The notitiae on the margins of the Book of Deer record grants made to the Scottish religious community in the 12th century and a claim that it was founded by Saint Columba and Saint Drostan.

In 1219 the Earl of Buchan founded the Cistercian abbey of New Deer about two miles westward of the old foundation, granting to the new abbey a portion of the lands of Old Deer, the rest going to the maintenance of a parochial church. William brought Cistercian monks from Kinloss Abbey near Elgin to establish the new monastery. The old religious community was probably absorbed by the new foundation, which was dedicated to the Blessed Virgin. Deer Abbey was always a small community, with never more than 15 monks at any one time. The history of the abbey after the 1210s is obscure until the 16th century, when it was beginning to be secularized. The abbey was turned into a secular lordship for Commendator Robert Keith II (becoming Lord Altrie) in 1587.

The church was cruciform in shape, 157 feet (48 m), with a north aisle to the nave. Some fragments of this remain, along with a piscina. Considerable portions of the south range of the cloisters remain, approximately 70 feet (21 m) by 90 feet (27 m).

The Abbey was included in the lands obtained by James Ferguson, Lord Pitfour, and became part of the Pitfour estate in 1766. His son, the third laird, built the 5 metres (16 ft) high enclosing wall in 1809 and used the grounds as an orchard. The four-columned Doric pedimented portico was taken from an earlier mausoleum. He also discovered some of the graves but did not disturb them. The fifth laird had the site cleared and used the stones from the Abbey building to have a mausoleum constructed in which to bury his daughter when she died aged 21 years in 1851. The only other person buried in the mausoleum was Ferguson's mother-in-law.

By the early 1900s, the estate was bankrupt. The property was acquired around 1926 by the Roman Catholic Diocese of Aberdeen, which shortly thereafter gave custody to the Ministry of Works. The house, which was in poor repair, was demolished; much of its stone was said to have been used for the construction of council houses in Aberdeen. The mausoleum was removed in the 1930s and parts of it were used to build an entrance; however this was undertaken without disturbing the graves of Lady Langford and Ferguson's daughter, Eliza. The property is managed by Historic Scotland.

== Burials ==
- William Comyn, Lord of Badenoch
- Alexander Comyn, Earl of Buchan
- Alexander Comyn (died 1308)

== Antiquities ==
There is considerable evidence of prehistory in the local area, most notably in the form of the Catto Long Barrow and numerous tumuli slightly to the south.

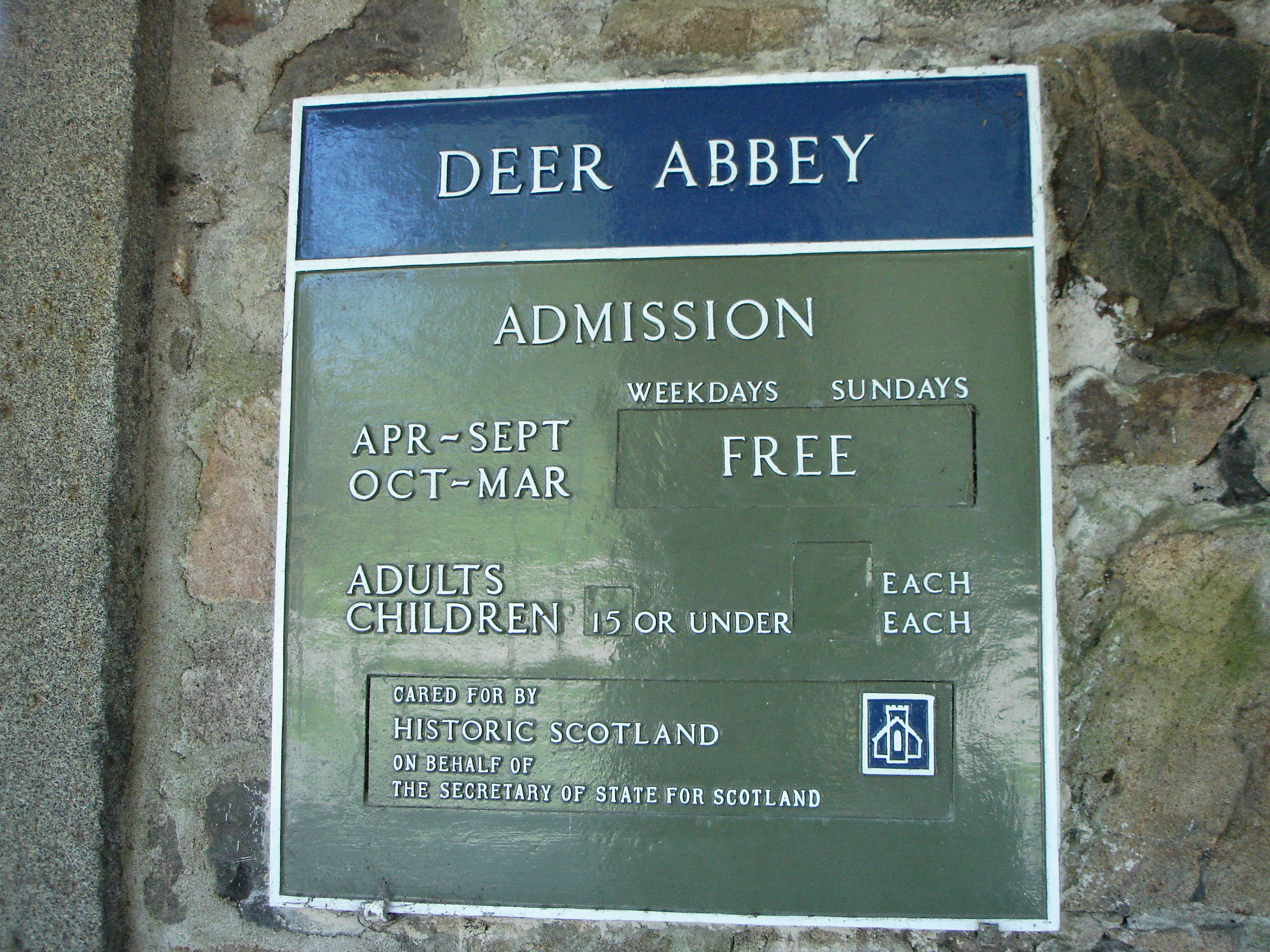
Entrance sign to the modern ruins

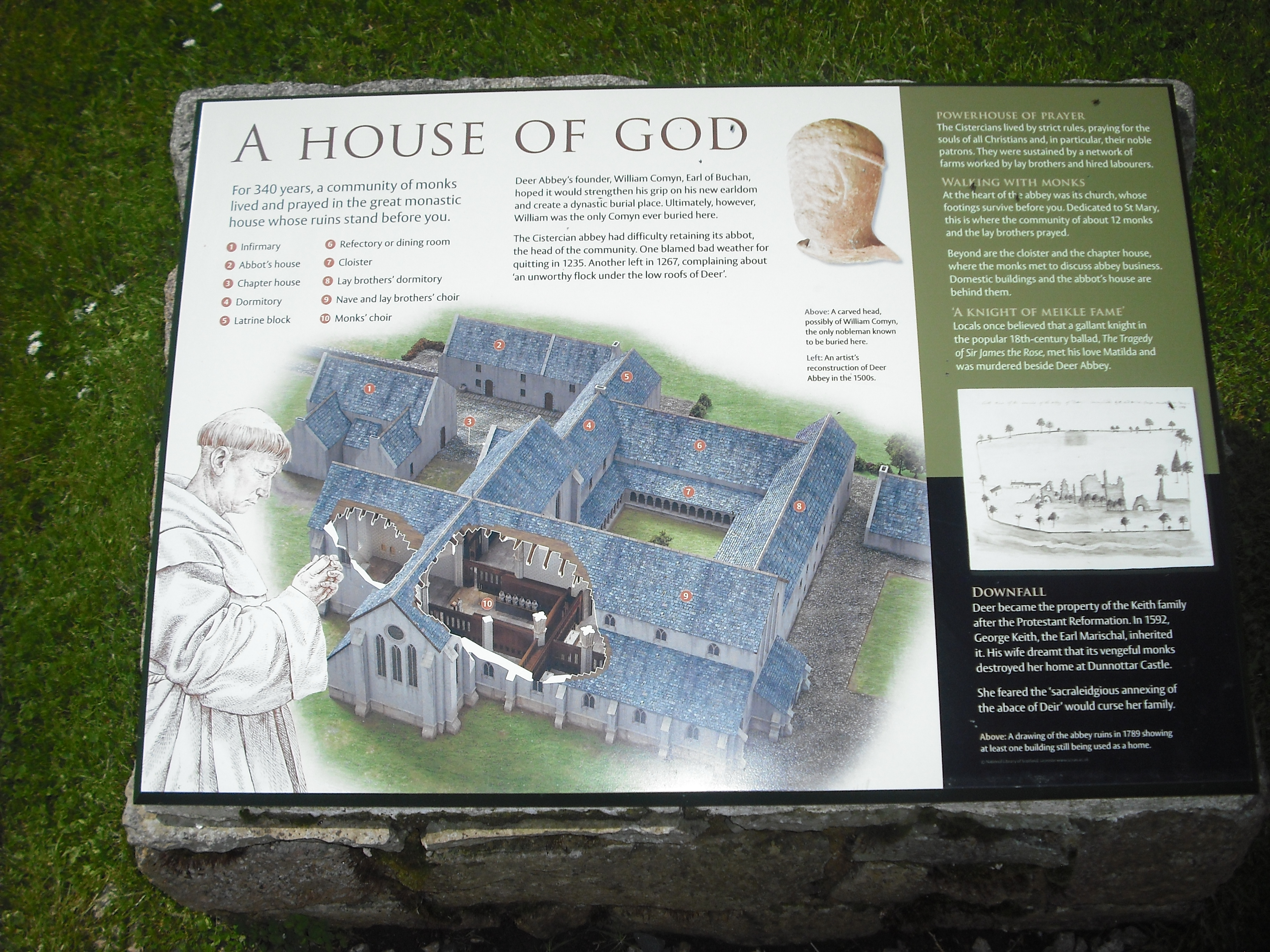
Main information plaque at the abbey

== See also ==
- Abbot of Deer, for a list of abbots and commendators of the Cistercian monastery
- River Ugie

== Bibliography ==
- Ian B. Cowan and David E. Easson (1976) Medieval Religious Houses: Scotland With an Appendix on the Houses in the Isle of Man, Second Edition, London, pp. 47, 74
- D.E.R. Watt and N.F. Shead (eds.) (2001) The Heads of Religious Houses in Scotland from the 12th to the 16th Centuries, The Scottish Records Society, New Series, Volume 24, Edinburgh, pp. 54–8
- C. Michael Hogan (2008) Catto Long Barrow fieldnotes, The Modern Antiquarian
