= George Skene (politician) =

Scottish soldier and politician (1749–1825)

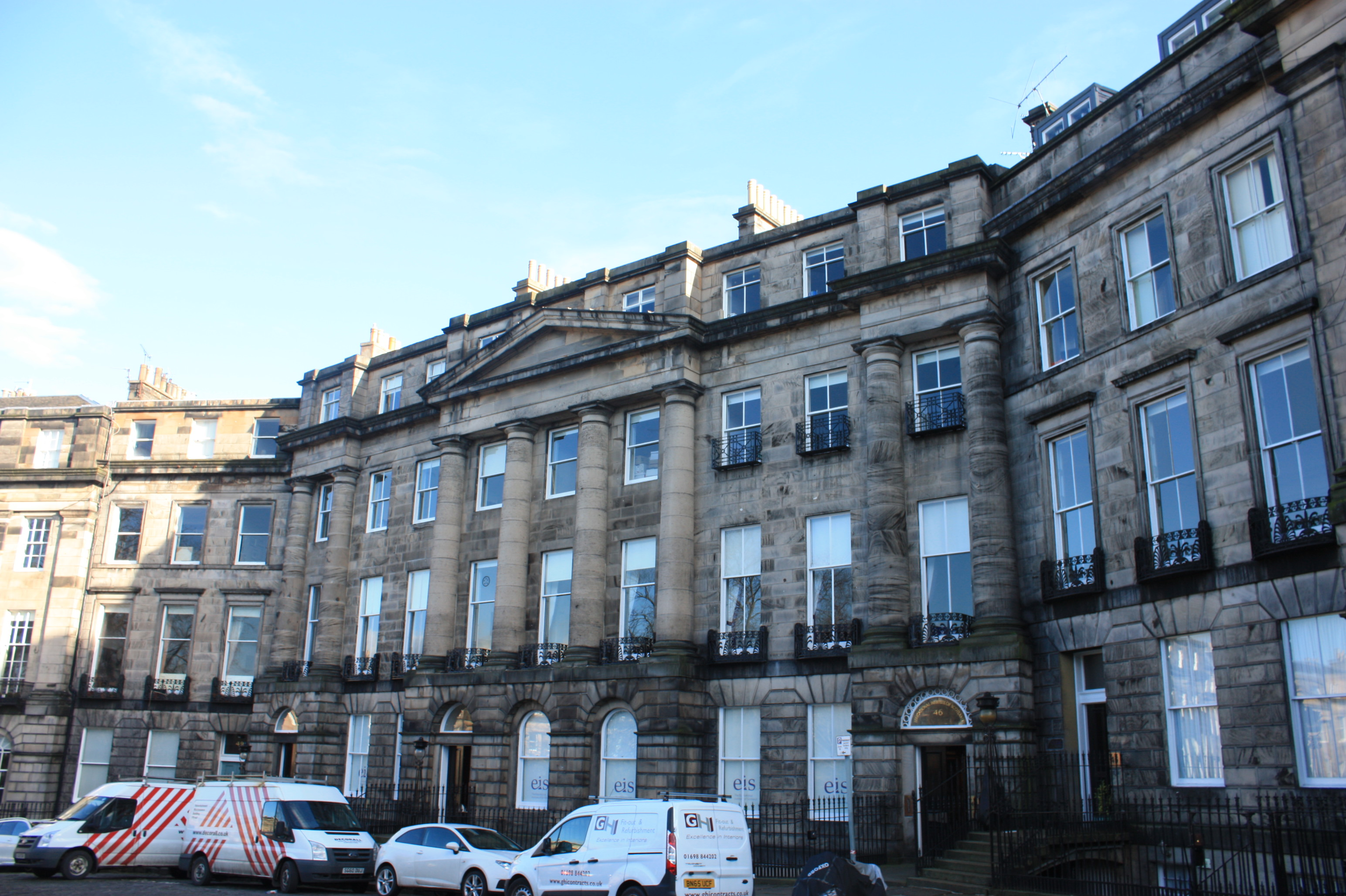
46 to 48 Moray Place, Edinburgh: Skene's house is the right hand section of the palace front

George Skene (9 May 1749 – 27 April 1825), of Skene, was a Scottish army officer and politician.

== Life ==
The eldest son of George Skene of Skene, George the younger was educated for the law, and became an advocate at the Scottish bar, although he never practised. He subsequently entered the army, and rose to the rank of captain in the 81st Highlanders in 1781, the year he succeeded his father in the estate of Skene.

Skene was a committed Whig and supporter of Charles James Fox. He was elected as the member of parliament (MP) for Aberdeenshire at a by-election in 1786, defeating the Tory James Ferguson, but declined to contest the latter for the seat in 1790. He briefly returned to Parliament, representing Elgin Burghs, from 1806 to 1807.

His "violent" Whiggery and alcoholism much impaired his political career, but he remained influential in the public affairs of Aberdeenshire, in part due to his pleasant manner. Upon his death, he was succeeded by his brother Alexander Skene, who was deaf, dumb, and nearly blind; upon Alexander's death two years later, an entail enacted by George brought the Skene estates to his nephew, the Earl Fife.

At the end of his life he was living at 46 Moray Place in the fashionable Moray Estate on the west side of Edinburgh.

== Sources ==
- William Forbes Skene, ed. (1887). Memorials of the Family of Skene of Skene. Aberdeen, Printed for the New Spalding Club. pp. 45–47.

Parliament of Great Britain
Preceded by Alexander Garden	Member of Parliament for Aberdeenshire; 1786–1790	Succeeded by James Ferguson
Parliament of the United Kingdom
Preceded by Francis Ogilvy-Grant	Member of Parliament for Elgin Burghs; 1806–1807	Succeeded by Archibald Campbell-Colquhoun
