= Robert Ferguson (minister) =

Scottish presbyterian minister, conspirator and political pamphleteer

Robert Ferguson (c. 1637–1714) was a Scottish presbyterian minister, conspirator and political pamphleteer, known as "the Plotter".

== Ancestry ==
He was the eldest son of William Ferguson (d. 1699) of Badifurrow, Aberdeenshire, Scotland and Janet Black. His father disinherited him so the lands of Badifurrow passed to Ferguson's younger brother William, who pre-deceased William senior, so the lands were inherited by James Ferguson who immediately sold the estate and purchased Pitfour. Another younger brother was Major General James Ferguson.

== Life ==
After receiving a good education, probably at the University of Aberdeen, became a Presbyterian (Church of Scotland) minister.

According to Bishop Burnet he was cast out by the Presbyterians, but whether this be so or not, he soon made his way to England and became vicar of Godmersham, Kent, from which living he was expelled by the Act of Uniformity 1662.

Some years later, having gained a reputation as a theological controversialist and become a person of importance among the Nonconformists, he attracted the notice of Anthony Ashley-Cooper, 1st Earl of Shaftesbury and the party which favoured the exclusion of the Duke of York from the throne, and he began to write political pamphlets just at the time when the feeling against the Roman Catholics was at its height. In 1680 he wrote "A Letter to a Person of Honour concerning the 'Black Box,'" in which he supported the claim of the Duke of Monmouth to the crown against that of the Duke of York [there was said to be a black box that contained a marriage contract between Charles II and Lucy Walter]. Returning to the subject after Charles II had solemnly denied the existence of a marriage between himself and Lucy Walter.

He took an active part in the controversy over the Exclusion Bill, and claimed to be the author of the whole of the pamphlet "No Protestant Plot" (1681), parts of which are usually ascribed to Shaftesbury. Ferguson was deeply implicated in the Rye House Plot, although he asserted that he had frustrated both this and a subsequent attempt to assassinate the king, and he fled to the Netherlands with Shaftesbury in 1682, returning to England early in 1683.

For his share in another plot against Charles II he was declared an outlaw, after which he entered into communication with Archibald Campbell, 9th Earl of Argyll, Monmouth and other malcontents. Ferguson then took a leading part in organizing the rising of 1685. Having overcome Monmouth's reluctance to take part in this movement, he accompanied the duke to the west of England and drew up the manifesto against James II, escaping to the Netherlands after the Battle of Sedgemoor. He landed in England with William III of Orange in 1688, and aided William's cause with his pen, but William and his advisers did not regard him as a person of importance, although his services were rewarded with a sinecure appointment in the Excise.

Chagrined at this treatment, Ferguson was soon in correspondence with the exiled Jacobites. He shared in all the plots against the life of William, and after his removal from the Excise in 1692 wrote violent pamphlets against the government. Although he was several times arrested on suspicion, he was never brought to trial. He died in great poverty, leaving behind him a great and deserved reputation for treachery.

It has been thought by Macaulay and others that Ferguson led the English government to believe that he was a spy in their interests, and that his frequent escapes from justice were due to official connivance. In a proclamation issued for his arrest in 1683 he is described as "a tall lean man, dark brown hair, a great Roman nose, thin-jawed, heat in his face, speaks in the Scottish accent, a sharp piercing eye, stoops a little in the shoulders."

== Works ==
Besides numerous pamphlets, Ferguson wrote: No Protestant-plot; or, the present pretended conspiracy of Protestants against the king and government, discovered to be a conspiracy of the Papists against the king and his Protestant-subjects (1682), History of the Revolution (1706); Qualifications requisite in a Minister of State (1710); and part of the History of all the Mobs, Tumults and Insurrections in Great Britain (London, 1715).
