= HMS Spey (1814) =

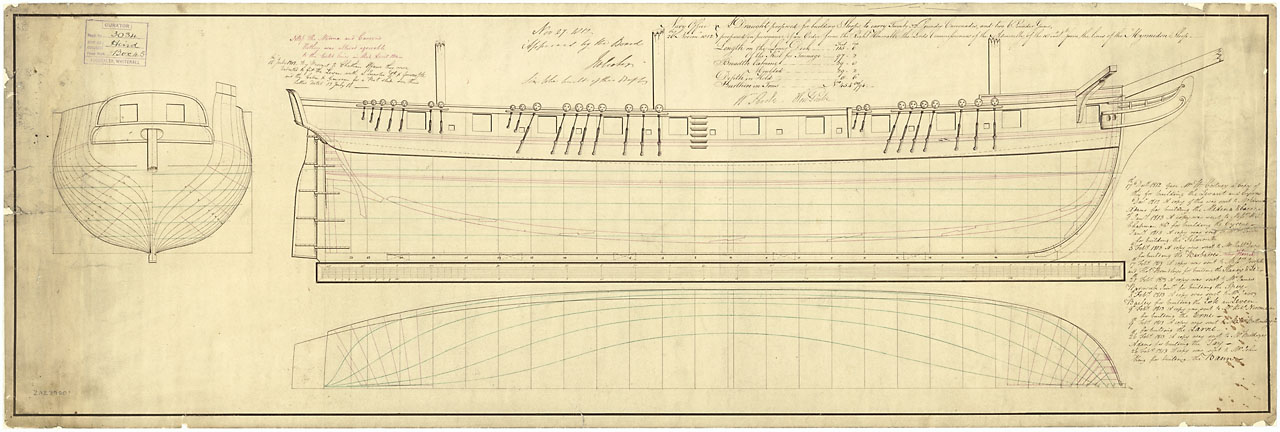
- Spey

History

United Kingdom
- Name: HMS Spey
- Namesake: River Spey
- Ordered: 18 November 1812
- Builder: James Warwick, Eling
- Laid down: May 1813
- Launched: 8 January 1814
- Fate: Sold 1822

Gran Colombia
- Name: Boyacá
- Namesake: Battle of Boyacá
- Owner: Navy of Gran Colombia
- Acquired: 1822 by purchase
- Fate: Laid up 1826

General characteristics
- Class & type: Cyrus-class ship-sloop
- Type: Ship-sloop
- Tons burthen: 46344/94 (bm)
- Length: Overall:115 ft 8 3/8 in (35.3 m); Keel:97 ft 4 1/2 in (29.7 m)
- Beam: 29 ft 11 in (9.1 m)
- Depth of hold: 8 ft 6 in (2.6 m)
- Crew: 135
- Armament: Upper deck:20 × 32-pounder carronades + 2 × 6-pounder chase guns

HMS Spey was a sixth rate post ship, launched for the Royal Navy in 1814 towards the end of the Napoleonic Wars. She had a short naval career, serving on the St Helena and Malta stations. While on the Malta Station in 1819, she was instrumental in the apprehension of a British pirate vessel.

The Navy sold Spey in 1822. She then was sold to the government of Gran Colombia and renamed Boyacá. The vessel participated in the Battle of Lake Maracaibo in 1823, and took part in the capture of numerous Spanish vessels, including the Spanish frigate Ceres, in 1824. She was laid up in 1827, and thereafter disappears from naval records.

== Royal Navy ==
Spey immediately went into Ordinary after launch. Then in 1814 Spey was under the command of Captain Hew Stewart. She received a double bottom to the line of flotation and was fitted for sea at Portsmouth between December 1814 and 7 February 1815.

Captain George Fergusson commissioned her in December 1814, and she was fitted for foreign service at Woolwich between September and December 1815. Captain John Lake recommissioned her in October.

On 15 November 1816 Captain James Arthur Murray was promoted to post captain and command of Spey. He then sailed her for the Cape of Good Hope and St Helena. In 1818 she was under the command of Captain James Kearney White, and then on 12 August 1819 Captain Frederick Noel was promoted to post captain and command of Spey for the Mediterranean.

=== Capture of a pirate ===
On 3 October the brig Frederick, under the command of Lieutenant William Hobson, of Spey, brought the brig William, of Liverpool, into Malta with Delano, her master, and her entire crew (less the steward who had escaped), in chains. It was expected that Captain Delano and his men would be tried on 26 October at Malta for piracy and possibly murder, William's mate being missing.

William had earlier left Malta and then plundered an American vessel and a Portuguese one. One vessel she had plundered was Helen, Cornish, master, that had been on her way from Liverpool to Leghorn and Genoa. Merchants in Malta requested assistance from the Royal Navy to chase William and apprehend the pirates. However, Spey was to sail to Genoa and Racehorse was not ready for sea. The insurance companies in Malta hired Frederick to look for William. Noel contributed Lieutenant Hobson to command Frederick, and Spey and Racehorse also contributed a midshipman and 18 seamen to man Frederick. She had two men from Helen aboard and they identified William in the harbour at Smyrna. Hobson put his men into two boats, one towing the other, which was covered, and they rowed up to William, boarded her, and arrested the crew. Frederick and William arrived back at Malta on 3 October.

The pirates were found guilty and eight were sentenced to death, though the Governor of Malta extended clemency to two. The death sentence stipulated that William be painted black and towed out to the middle of the harbour of Valletta, and that the pirates be hanged on her. Captain Charles Christopher Delano and five of his men were hanged on 4 February 1820. The bodies were then taken down and those of Delano and three of his men were placed in gibbets erected at Fort Ricasoli. (The remaining two hanged pirates were buried below the gibbets.)

In 1820 Spey was under the command of Commander John Boswell, who had joined Spey on 12 August 1819, and who had returned with her to Portsmouth on 9 August 1821. In September 1821 Commander Charles Phillips replaced Boswell. Spey was paid-off on 28 September 1821.

=== Disposal ===
The "Principal Officers and Commissioners of His Majesty's Navy" offered "Spey sloop, of 20 guns 463 tons", "lying at Chatham", for sale on 18 April 1822. She was sold on that day to Mr. Vincent for £1,350.

== Navy of Gran Colombia ==
On 27 February 1821 the representative of the New Granada Patriots in London, Luis López Méndez (the Extraordinary and Plenipotentiary Minister of Venezuela), agreed to a loan of £150,000 from the merchant James Mackintosh to cover the purchase of arms and equipment for 10,000 men, and three vessels. López Méndez was not authorized to sign such an agreement and Mackintosh may have known it. The Colombia government never ratified the agreement.

Mackintosh acquired three vessels, Tarántula, Lady Boringdon, and Spey, and in 1822 sent them out. The Colombians initially refused to accept the cargo, but the fall of Maracaibo to the Royalists on 7 September 1822 caused them to change their minds. They then took the equipment and took over the three vessels for their navy. Tarantula appears to have retained her name, or perhaps was sent on her way. Lady Boringdon became Constitución and Spey Boyacá. (Note: In December 1824, eight months after it had signed a treaty of amity and commerce with the United Kingdom, the Colombian Government signed an agreement to pay MacIntosh £187,500 for the supplies and the three vessels he had bought. The Colombian government made only a partial payment until in 1851 it signed a new agreement to pay £150,000 in bonds receivable for customs duties. The matter was finally settled in 1873 when Colombia made the last of several installment payments. Although Colombia ended up paying much more than the original loan due to cumulative interest payments, Mackintosh received none of the money as he had died.)

In 1823 Boyacá participated in the Battle of Lake Maracaibo.

Later in 1823 and 1824 she was a member of a small squadron under Rene Beluche that patrolled the Caribbean. Boyacá and Bolivar reportedly freed a number of British and French ships that the Spanish Royalists had captured. They also captured 15 Royalist vessels.

A list of vessels making up a Colombian squadron cruising in the Gulf of Maracaibo in 1823 under the command of Rene Beluche included "Bolivar corvette", of 25 guns and 250 men. (Note: A report from Paris dated 22 April 1826 stated that two Spanish frigates had captured Bolivar as she was on her way to the United States with officers for the Columbian squadron being formed there.) The list did not include Boyacá.

On 4 April 1824 Boyacá, Captain Brown, and Bolivar, Captain Clark, with Beluche the overall commander, encountered the Spanish frigate Ceres just off Havana.

- Bolivar: 22 × 32-pounder carronades + 1 × 12-pounder gun, and 156 men
- Boyacá: 22 × 32-pounder carronades + 2 × 32-pounder gunnades, and 140 men
- Ceres:26 × French 18-pounder long guns + 2 chase guns, and 396 men

In the subsequent action Ceres suffered 30 men killed and 60 wounded, half of whom died of their wounds. The Colombian Patriots had five wounded, including Beluche. The Colombians captured Ceres and took her into Pensacola, Florida, arriving there on 25 April. The Colombian vessels underwent repairs. Ceres was so damaged that she had to be scrapped.

== Fate ==
Lloyd's List reported on 15 May 1827 that Boyacá, of 22 guns, had been laid up at Cartagena (Colombia) in a dismasted state.
