= James Ferguson, Lord Pitfour =

Scottish advocate and judge (1700–1777)

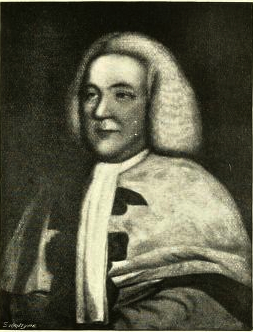
- Lord Pitfour
- Born: 1700; Pitfour, Aberdeenshire, Scotland
- Died: 25 June 1777 (aged 76–77); Gilmerton, Midlothian, Scotland
- Education: Marischal College, Aberdeen; University of Edinburgh
- Occupation: Advocate

James Ferguson, Lord Pitfour (1700 – 25 June 1777) was a Scottish advocate and second Laird of Pitfour, a large estate in Buchan. His flourishing law practice was sited opposite Parliament House in Edinburgh. He became Dean of the Faculty of Advocates in 1760 and was elevated to the bench as Lord Pitfour, in 1764.

Pitfour was described as one of the greatest lawyers in the country. However, by the time he became a Senator of the College of Justice he was past his prime intellectually and thus did not make much of an impact in that role. A Jacobite sympathiser, he is best known for his defence of rebels standing trial at Carlisle after the Jacobite risings.

Ferguson inherited the Pitfour estate on the death of his father, James Ferguson, 1st Laird of Pitfour. He purchased additional lands and expanded the estate, which became known as "the Blenheim of the North". A staunch Episcopalian, he had a private Qualified Chapel built on the estate. He also established a small village and arranged for plantations of Douglas firs near the mansion house.

== Ancestry and early life ==
Ferguson was born at Pitfour in 1700 shortly after his father, also named James, had purchased the estate. Ferguson's father was the first Laird of Pitfour and previously had the honorific James Fergusson of Badifurrow. His mother was Ann Stuart. In 1733 Ferguson married Anne Murray (1708–1793), a sister of Patrick Murray, 5th Lord Elibank and James Murray, a British army officer who became Governor of Quebec. They had three sons. The eldest, James (1736–1820), became a politician; Patrick (1744–1780) invented the Ferguson rifle, a breech-loading flintlock weapon; and the youngest, George (1748–1820), became Lieutenant Governor of Tobago in 1779. Ferguson also had three daughters: Ann, Elizabeth and Jane.

In his memoirs, John Ramsay of Ochtertyre described the first Laird was as "having been an adventurer in the South Sea" and that he "would have been a ruined man, but for his son's exertions." Wilson-Smith interprets this to mean the first Laird had lost a great deal of money investing in the South Sea Company, but the expansive lands he procured generated sufficient revenue to continue payments on the debts until the situation was later fully remedied via the financial acumen of his son, Lord Pitfour.

== Career ==
Ferguson studied at the Marischal College in Aberdeen from 1711 to 1715. He then studied law at the University of Edinburgh before completing his education at Groningen and Utrecht. He became a member of the Faculty of Advocates on his return to Edinburgh in early 1722. He was appointed as Vice-Dean of the Faculty of Advocates in January 1759 and became Dean when Robert Dundas was elevated to Lord President of the Court of Session in June 1760.

In 1764, the Earl of Mansfield successfully petitioned George III to allow Ferguson to be promoted to fill the vacant position of judge sitting in the Court of Session. Ferguson became a Senator of the College of Justice in June 1764. This entitled him to thereafter be addressed as "Lord Pitfour".

The law practice was at one point based in a substantial seven-storey tenement house purchased by Ferguson at 333 High Street, Edinburgh, opposite Parliament House. The law practice occupied the four upper floors of the building; shops were on the lower level. Pitfour's legal services were in great demand and he was able to charge twice the fees of his associates.

His law practice had many influential clients, including Lord Braco and the sons of Lord Fraser of Lovat. Pitfour was one of 15 advocates acting in a case raised by Alexander Fraser against Lord Fraser claiming the liferents to the Lovat estates. Eventually a compromise was reached; Lovat retained the liferents and Fraser gained a monetary sum instead. As the negotiations had taken many hours of legal deliberation over a three-year period, the case proved very profitable for Pitfour.

Ferguson was a Jacobite. The records of the Spalding Club include a soldier's letter which indicates it is likely Ferguson was willing to offer refuge to Jacobites who participated in the Battle of Culloden. Jacobite rebels captured from throughout Scotland were taken to stand trial at Carlisle Castle in 1746. Ferguson and fellow advocate Alexander Lockhart argued in their defence. Prosecutors showed little mercy, calling for the rebels to be executed by hanging. Since the prosecution assumed anyone dressed in tartan was guilty, Ferguson and Lockhart had their servants dress in tartan and appear along with the other defendants. They called each other to the stand to testify as to the whereabouts of the servants and proved that, despite their tartan dress, the defendants could not have taken part in the rebellion. Many were found guilty, but the tactic succeeded, as some of the accused were acquitted, including the Laird of Dunfallandy, a kinsman of Ferguson.

The 1773 papers of George III contain details of Pitfour accompanying Lord Justice Clerk Thomas Miller on the Northern Circuit from the end of April until 20 May. Among the cases heard were the trial of a servant accused of murdering another servant on Skye, and the case of Edward Shaw McIntosh, a Borlum gentleman of rank who together with his brother and some of their servants was accused of several instances of housebreaking which had escalated to murder and highway robbery. Some of the gang was caught, but McIntosh remained an outlaw.

Lord Pitfour was widely admired and often dined with fellow lawyer and biographer James Boswell, who declared Pitfour to be one of the greatest Scottish lawyers. This was endorsed by the diarist John Ramsay of Ochtertyre (1736–1814), who remarked that Pitfour was one of a small number of barristers who he found satisfying to hear speak. Pitfour practised law in Edinburgh at the height of the Scottish Enlightenment and was a member of The Poker Club.

Lord Pitfour is described as being good humoured but of a "somewhat awkward manner" and small in stature. His voice was shrill and he had poor eyesight. He was shrewd, kind and sympathetic, which put him at odds with some of his colleagues on the bench. Serving at the same time as Lord Braxfield, who had a reputation for handing down severe sentences, Pitfour was viewed as indecisive and too lenient. His desire to be fair and reach compromise had stood him in good stead as an advocate, but as a judge, these characteristics drew criticism from his contemporaries. Lord Kames was critical of him, maintaining that Pitfour did not want anyone to be hanged. Writing in 2008, local historian Alex Buchan speculated that Pitfour's hard life travelling around Scotland took too much of a toll on him, leading to a rapid decline in his health and ability. At 64 years of age at his appointment as a judge, he was likely too old to be effective.

== Pitfour ==
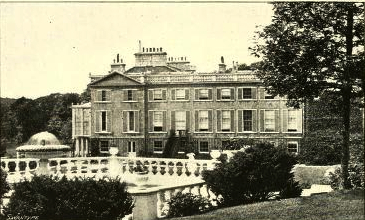
A side view of Pitfour House, c. late 19th century

Ferguson inherited the expansive Pitfour estate on the death of his father, the first Laird, in 1734. The second Laird expanded the estate and continued the work that developed it into one of the largest and most lavish estates in Scotland. The estate was described by Charles McKean as "the Blenheim of Buchan" but it has also been referred to as "the Blenheim of the North" and "the Ascot of the North". The village of Fetterangus was established by Pitfour just over a mile north of the mansion house in 1752.

In 1766, Lord Pitfour paid £15,000 to add further land to the estate. The land had been forfeited to the crown and subsequently purchased by the York Buildings Company after George II instigated an attainder against George Keith, the final Earl Marischal, who was pardoned in 1761. After the Earl Marischal returned to favour and the York Buildings Company suffered financial difficulties, he bought the land back for £31,000 at an auction, to the delight of friends and others present. He displayed little interest in the property and sold it to Lord Pitfour. Furtive negotiations had taken place between Pitfour and the Earl Marischal to conclude the transaction, as the Earl Marischal did not want the details publicly known, fearing reproaches from his friends. The land, adjacent to the Pitfour property, incorporated St Fergus and Inverugie Castle, the former seat of the Earls Marischal. The 8,000 acres (32 km^{2}) was predominantly peat bogs, woods and uncultivated land. The addition of this extensive property made Pitfour the largest estate in the area, stretching over 30,000 acres (120 km^{2}) from Buchanhaven in Peterhead and along the course of the River Ugie to Maud. Pitfour had handled the Earl Marischal's complex legal requirements over a lengthy period, but the purchase of the land led to ill feeling and insinuations against Pitfour of underhand dealing from other landowners. He never regained popularity in the area and subsequently spent less time at the estate.

Pitfour, an Episcopalian, had a small Qualified Chapel built on the estate at Waulkmill in 1766. This large plain building could accommodate up to 500 parishioners. Saplinbrae, a house that was initially used as a coaching inn after its construction on Pitfour's instruction in 1756, was used as the minister's manse. Douglas firs were planted near Saplinbrae and Deer Abbey from seed sent from Canada by Pitfour's brother-in-law, General James Murray.

== Death and legacy ==
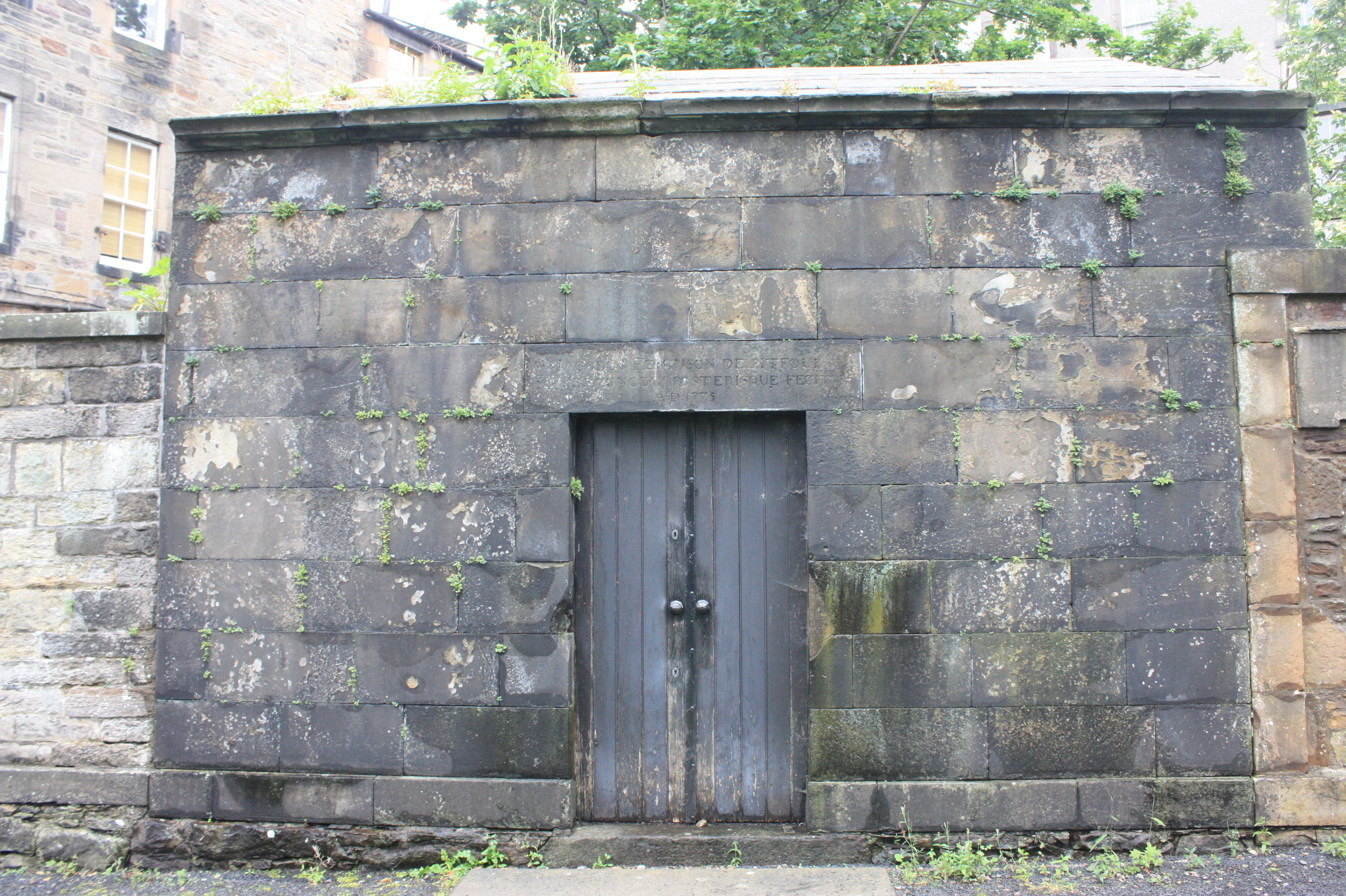
The tomb of James Ferguson, Lord Pitfour, Greyfriars Kirkyard

Lord Pitfour suffered from poor health in his later years, and he resigned from the judiciary in 1776. Correspondence between Pitfour's two brothers-in-law, Lord Elibank and General Murray, shortly after Pitfour died describes how "he had in a manner lost his senses". After his death at Gilmerton on 25 June 1777, he was buried in a vault that he had paid to be built two years previously in Greyfriars Kirkyard, Edinburgh. One of several vaults situated in the southern boundary wall, it is described by Buchan as "a plain, even ugly, pitched-roof building". Fitted with a heavy freestone slab roof to hinder bodysnatchers, it bears the simple inscription: "Jacobus Ferguson de Pitfour. Sibi. conjugi, posterisque fecit. A. D. 1775." Also housed in the vault are the coffins of Pitfour's wife, two female relatives and two of Pitfour's sons. Lord Pitfour was succeeded by his eldest son, James.
