= Fetterangus =

Village in the United Kingdom

Coordinates: 57.54739°N 2.02337°W

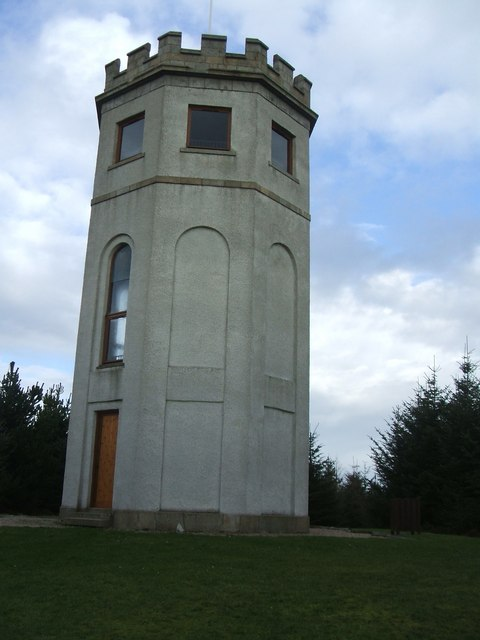
Drinnie's Observatory

Fetterangus (Scottish Gaelic: Fothair Aonghais, Scots: Fishie) is a small village in Aberdeenshire, Scotland, located just to the north of Mintlaw. Fetterangus is often called "Fishie", though the origin of this nickname is unknown.

Lord Pitfour is credited with establishing the village of Fetterangus in 1752 as it fell within the lands of the Pitfour estate.

Fetterangus was in Banffshire until 1891.

Though only having a population of 400, the village has an active community association that has erected a community owned windturbine near the village to earn an income for community projects by selling power to the national grid.

A nearby visitor attraction is Drinnie's Observatory, which was built in 1845 and offers attractive views over the Buchan countryside for miles in all directions.

Fetterangus has its own primary school, though secondary pupils have a 2-mile journey to Mintlaw Academy.

== Prehistory ==
The local area is rich with prehistory and historical features. Somewhat to the south of Fetterangus are a number of prehistoric monuments including Catto Long Barrow, Silver Cairn and many tumuli. In the same vicinity of the Laeca Burn watershed is the point d'appui of historic battles between invading Danes and indigenous Picts.

== Notable people ==
- Elizabeth Stewart (singer), (1939-2022)
