= Invasion of Tobago =

French invasion of the British-held island of Tobago in 1781

- Part of the Anglo-French War (1778–1783) and the American Revolutionary War
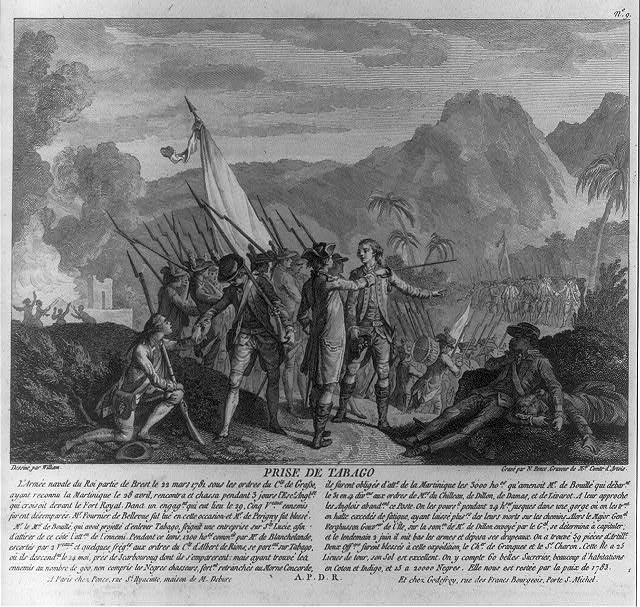
- French depiction of the invasion
Date	24 May – 2 June 1781 (1 week and 2 days)
Location	Tobago and St. Lucia
Result	French victory

Belligerents
Great Britain	France

Commanders and leaders
George Brydges Rodney; George Ferguson; Anthony St Leger; Francis Samuel Drake	Comte de Grasse; Marquis de Bouillé; Philibert François Rouxel de Blanchelande; Albert de Rions

Strength
800 regulars and militia 6 ships of the line	4,500 troops 24 ships of the line

Casualties and losses
800; Unknown troops lost to heat or captured, the rest surrendered 1 ship of the line lost	46 killed 105 wounded

The French invaded the British-held island of Tobago in 1781 during the Anglo-French War. On 24 May 1781, the fleet of Comte de Grasse landed troops on the island under the command of General Marquis de Bouillé. By 2 June 1781, they had successfully gained control of the island.

== Background ==
Following the Battle of Fort Royal, Hood's retreat had left Santa Lucia exposed to a French invasion. Additionally, two French ships of the line and 1300 troops sailed from Martinique against Tobago.

De Grasse met with Martinique's governor, Marquis de Bouillé, and developed a plan for capturing Tobago. The French forces were to be divided, with one convoy accompanied by a small number of battle ships to head for Tobago, with the rest of the forces to land on St. Lucia as a diversion. The forces used in the diversion would then be withdrawn and sent to Tobago, reinforcing the first convoy.

Led by de Bouillé and accompanied by de Grasse, the St. Lucia division withdrew from Martinique on 8 May 1781. The Tobago-bound division, led by Blanchelande and accompanied by two ships of the line and a number of frigates, departed on 9 May 1781.

== Attack on St. Lucia ==
Bouillé's force, numbering between 1,200 and 1,500, landed at Gros Islet, a village at the northern tip of St. Lucia, early on 10 May. They surprised the small British garrison there, taking about 100 prisoners and seizing military supplies. This prompted General Anthony St Leger, the island's lieutenant governor, to organise the defence of Castries and fortify the slopes of Morne Fortune above that port.

However, the defenses Rodney had erected on Pigeon Island ensured the French invasion was a failure. De Grasse returned to Martinique, but promptly departed for Tobago on 25 May. On the 29th, Rodney dispatched a squadron six ships of the line, under the command of Admiral Francis Samuel Drake, to help defend Tobago.

== Invasion of Tobago ==
On 24 May, the detachment of General Blanchelande arrived at Tobago. Under cover fire from the Pluton and the Experiment, his troops landed near the port of Scarborough. They quickly overran the town's forts, and Governor George Ferguson led his remaining forces into the hills. These forces, three to four hundred regulars and four to five hundred militia, established a strong position fortified by cannons on the interior ridge. Blanchelande followed, but decided to wait for reinforcements rather than attack the position. De Grasse then landed troops on both sides of the island the next day, and Bouillé made a junction with Blanchelande outside the British line of defence. They decided to attack the next day. With the arrival of French reinforcements, Ferguson decided to abandon his position, and began a retreat that night.

On 30 May, de Grasse and Drake encountered each other, but Drake retreated, and arrived back in Barbados on 3 June. Rodney then sailed for Tobago with his entire fleet. On 4 June, Rodney arrived off Tobago, only to learn the island had been captured on 2 June.

== Aftermath ==
On 9 June, Rodney, returning to Barbados, spotted de Grasse's fleet. Rodney was to windward, with 20 ships against 23, but decided to avoid action, fearing the currents could possibly put him between St. Vincent and Grenada, exposing Barbados.

When Ferguson reached London, he and Rodney engaged in a highly public war of words over Rodney's failure to relieve the island in a timely manner.

De Grasse returned to Martinique, then on 5 July, sailed for Cap-Français, reaching it on 26 July. Awaiting him were dispatches from Washington and Rochambeau, requesting he bring his French fleet to Chesapeake Bay or New York. De Grasse's fleet then played a pivotal part in the subsequent Battle of the Chesapeake and Siege of Yorktown.

The island of Tobago remained in French hands under the terms of the 1783 Treaty of Paris that ended the war; it was again fought over during the Napoleonic Wars, and fell definitively under British control with the 1814 Treaty of Paris.

== Additional reading ==
- De Grasse, François Joseph Paul. The Operations of the French fleet under the Count de Grasse in 1781-2
- Colomb, Philip Howard. Naval warfare, its ruling principles and practice historically treated
- Lewis, Charles. Admiral de Grasse and American Independence
- Southey, Thomas. Chronological history of the West Indies: in Three Volumes Volume 2 (contains Governor Ferguson's statement on the invasion)
