= Patrick Ferguson =

British Army officer (1744–1780)

Coordinates: 35.11935°N 81.39359°W

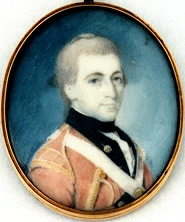
- c. 1774–1777 portrait
- Born: 4 June 1744; Pitfour estate, Aberdeenshire
- Died: 7 October 1780 (aged 36); York County, South Carolina
- Military career
- Allegiance: Great Britain
- Branch: British Army
- Service years: 1758–1780
- Rank: Major
- Units: Royal North British Dragoons; 70th Regiment of Foot
- Commands: Ferguson's Corps of Riflemen; American Volunteers; 71st Regiment of Foot
- Conflicts: Seven Years' War; American War of Independence; Philadelphia campaign; Battle of Brandywine (WIA); Battle of Chestnut Neck; Affair at Little Egg Harbor; Battle of Kings Mountain †

Major Patrick Ferguson (4 June 1744 – 7 October 1780) was a British Army officer who served in the Seven Years' War and American War of Independence. Born in the Pitfour estate in Aberdeenshire, Ferguson was commissioned into the Royal North British Dragoons at the rank of cornet in 1758 and was sent with his regiment to Continental Europe in 1760. He served in Flanders and Germany until returning to Britain due to a leg ailment. Following his recovery Ferguson served on garrison duty before transferring to the 70th Regiment of Foot at the rank of captain in 1768 and commanding a battalion company in Tobago. Following his return to Britain in 1774 Ferguson undertook light infantry training and invented the Ferguson rifle.

In March 1777 Ferguson left Britain and sailed to North America, where he raised Ferguson's Corps of Riflemen to serve in the American War of Independence. Ferguson participated in the Philadelphia campaign and was wounded at the Battle of Brandywine in September. Though his unit was disbanded the day after the battle Ferguson remained in North America and in October 1778 carried out two raids on American forces at Chestnut Neck and Little Egg Harbor. In October 1779 he was promoted to major in the 71st Regiment of Foot and in May 1780 was sent to North Carolina to recruit Loyalist soldiers. Pursuing a force of Patriot militia to the Appalachian Mountains, Ferguson was killed at the Battle of Kings Mountain in October 1780.

== Early life ==
Patrick Ferguson was born on 4 June 1744 in the Pitfour estate in Aberdeenshire. He was the second son and fourth child of the Scottish advocate James Ferguson and his wife Anne Murray, a sister of the literary patron Patrick Murray, 5th Lord Elibank. Through his parents, Ferguson knew a number of major figures in the Scottish Enlightenment, including the philosopher and historian David Hume, on whose recommendation he read Samuel Richardson's 1748 novel Clarissa; or, The History of a Young Lady when he was fifteen, and the dramatist John Home. Ferguson had numerous first cousins through his mother's family: these included Sir William Pulteney, George Johnstone and Sir James Pulteney.

== Seven Years' War and rifle invention ==
Ferguson's family had a long tradition of military service and encouraged by his maternal uncle Lieutenant-colonel James Murray he decided to pursue a career as a soldier from a young age. In 1756 Ferguson was sent to study at the Royal Military Academy, Woolwich and after graduating Ferguson's father purchased a cornet's commission for him in the British Army's 2nd (Royal North British) Regiment of Dragoons in 1758. Ferguson was sent with his regiment to Continental Europe in 1760 as part of the Seven Years' War, serving in Flanders in Germany until a leg ailment – most likely tuberculosis in the knee – forced him to return home. After recovering he served with his regiment on garrison duty in Britain, as the war ended in 1763.

In 1768 Ferguson's father purchased him a captain's commission in the 70th Regiment of Foot, which was then stationed in the British West Indies; the rank meant Ferguson commanded a regimental company, with his being stationed in Tobago. Ferguson set sail from Britain for Tobago in late 1768 and upon his arrival assumed command of his company. In 1770 Ferguson purchased the "Castara" slave plantation in Tobago and after his death the plantation was inherited by his younger brother George, who had managed it since the early 1770s and developed it into a successful enterprise which exported rum, sugar and molasses to Europe.

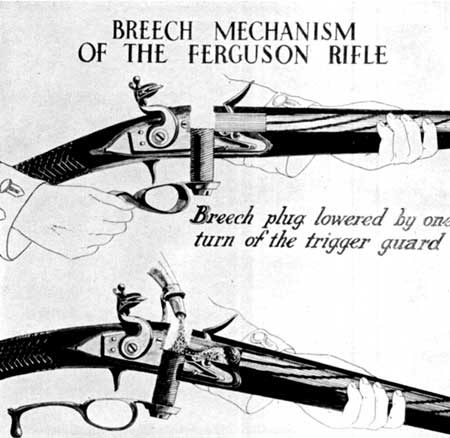
British Army manual for the Ferguson rifle

Showing great care for his company, Ferguson ordered them to take advantage of the tropical climate of Tobago and grow vegetables to supplement their rations, which primarily comprised corned beef. While in Tobago Ferguson contracted a disease which was most likely extrapulmonary tuberculosis, which compounded the tubercular arthritis he already had in his knees. Ferguson briefly visited the Thirteen Colonies of British America before returning to Britain in 1774. Following his return home Ferguson took part in light infantry training, coming to the attention of Major-general William Howe.

A major concern for Ferguson during this period was the British army's lack of rifles. Inspired by the earlier designs of the Huguenot gunsmith Isaac de la Chaumette, he began developing a breech-loading rifle and in 1774 contracted the head armourer at the Tower of London John Cooper to design such a rifle to his specifications. Over the course of the same year Ferguson's and Cooper's efforts resulted in the invention of the Ferguson rifle. The new rifle used an innovative falling screwed breechblock and was capable of firing between six and eight rounds a minute under any weather condition.

Ferguson patented his new rifle in 1776 and on 1 June of that year demonstrated it at Woolwich in windy and rainy conditions in front of several high-ranking British officers, who were impressed by the gun's rate of fire, accuracy, ability to be fired while prone and immunity to poor weather. Ferguson subsequently demonstrated the rifle in front of George III and Queen Charlotte at Windsor Castle to the same result. Ferguson's superiors proceeded to place an order for 100 copies of his new rifle, which were to be used by a new light infantry unit which Ferguson would raise in North America for service in the ongoing American War of Independence.

As Ferguson prepared to set sail for North America complications arose over the manufacture of his new weapon. Though the Industrial Revolution had already begun Britain lacked the factories necessary to mass-produce firearms; instead, all guns made in Britain were produced by individual gunsmiths. As Ferguson's rifle took much longer time to produce than the British army's standard issue Brown Bess musket only 67 were ready by the time Ferguson was ready to travel to North America. In March 1777 Ferguson set sail to North America along with all 67 copies of his rifle to join Howe's army, which was then stationed in New York and New Jersey as part of the campaign to control both regions.

== American War of Independence ==
=== New York, Pennsylvania and New Jersey ===
In Spring 1777 Ferguson arrived North America and began travelling among the various British infantry regiments stationed there to demonstrate his new rifle. Recruiting 100 men, mostly from the light companies of the 6th Regiment of Foot and 14th Regiment of Foot, he raised a new unit which was known as Ferguson's Corps of Riflemen. Ferguson trained his men to use his new rifle, though 33 soldiers had to be equipped with Brown Bess muskets due to the remaining rifles not being sent from Britain until June. When he deemed them ready Ferguson led his unit to join the command led by Lieutenant-general Wilhelm von Knyphausen in New York.

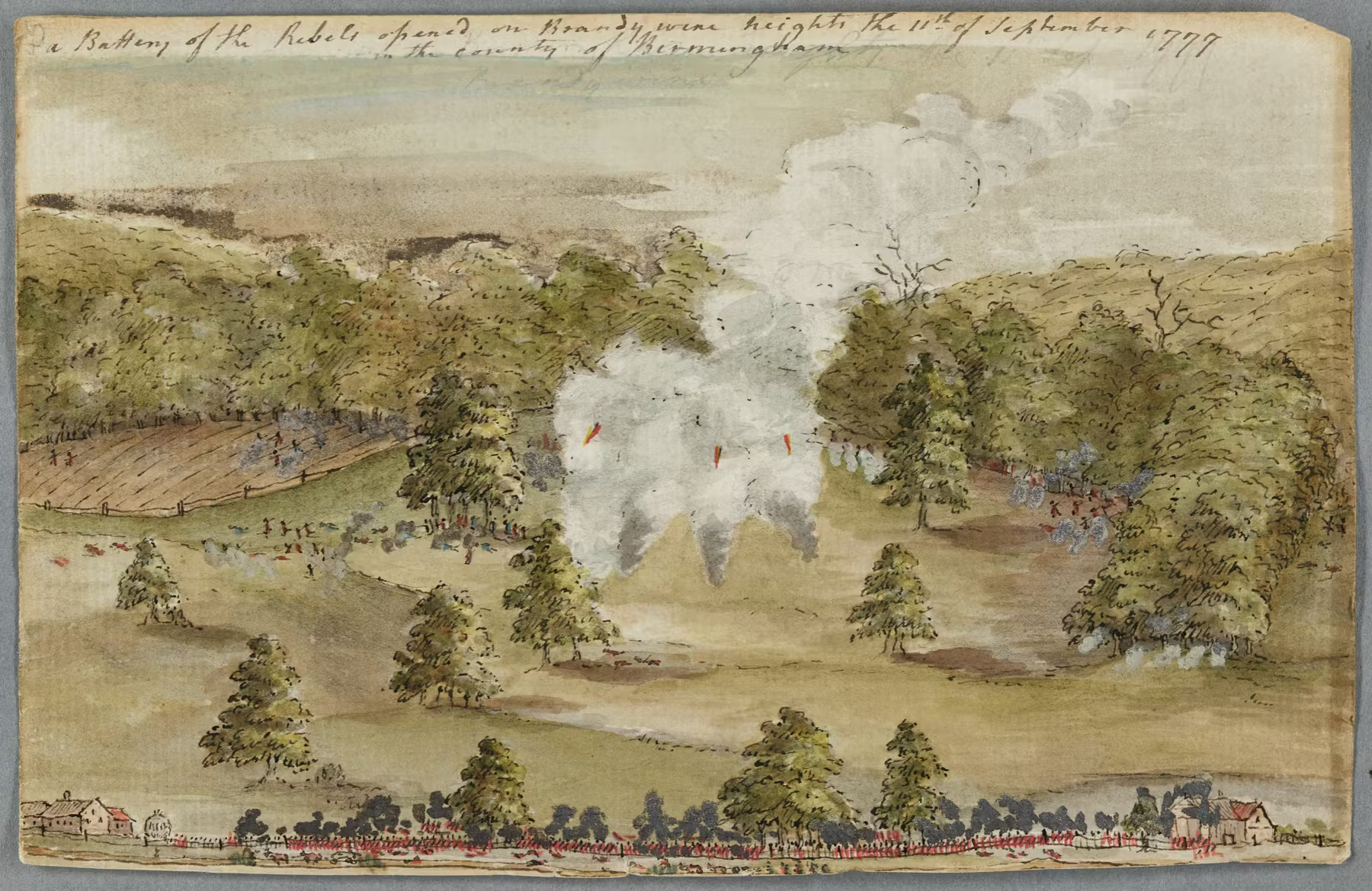
The Battle of Brandywine, at which Ferguson was wounded

Ferguson's Corps of Riflemen proceeded to participate in the Philadelphia campaign, where Ferguson was wounded on 11 September 1777 at the Battle of Brandywine when he was shot through the right elbow joint. At the battle he had had the chance to shoot two American officers but decided not to do so. A surgeon told Ferguson in the hospital that wounded American officers had said that General George Washington had been in the area at the time. Ferguson subsequently wrote that even if the officer was Washington he did not regret his decision. The officer's identity remains uncertain; some historians have suggested that instead of Washington one of the officers was Casimir Pulaski.

Howe disbanded Ferguson's unit on 12 September; the men were returned to their units and the rifles placed into storage or given to other units. For several months after being wounded Ferguson was at risk of having his arm amputated. During this time he received news that his father had died on 25 June. Ferguson eventually recovered and although his right arm was permanently crippled resumed military duties in May 1778 under the command of Lieutenant-general Sir Henry Clinton. In October Ferguson was assigned to lead a raid in southern New Jersey to counter American privateers based around Chestnut Neck in the Little Egg Harbor River who had been attacking British shipping. On 6 October Ferguson led 300 British regulars and 100 New Jersey Loyalists in an inconclusive attack on Chestnut Neck, capturing and destroying supplies before withdrawing.

About a week after the attack Ferguson was notified by a Hessian defector who had returned to the British side after an argument with the American Lieutenant Colonel Carl Von Bose that a detachment of Pulaski's troops under Von Bose's command was located nearby. Ferguson marched 250 Loyalist troops to the site of Bose's outpost which comprised fifty men and was a short distance from Pulaski's main encampment. At first light on 15 October 1778 Ferguson ordered his men to use bayonets to attack the sleeping American soldiers, killing 45 men and capturing five more in what became known as the affair at Little Egg Harbor. Pulaski eventually led his Pulaski's Legion forward, causing Ferguson's force to retreat to their boats. Ferguson reported his losses as two killed, three wounded, and one missing.

=== Southern theatre and death ===
In 1779 Ferguson raised the Loyalist American Volunteers and was promoted to major in the 71st Regiment of Foot on 25 October. In early 1780 British forces under the overall command of Lieutenant-general Lord Cornwallis began invading the Carolinas as part of the war's Southern theatre, and Ferguson was sent southwards to assist them. Clinton appointed Ferguson as the Inspector of Militia Corps on 22 May 1780 and ordered to go to Tryon County, North Carolina and recruit troops from the Loyalist population there to protect the left flank of Cornwallis' army at Charlotte, North Carolina. By this time Ferguson had acquired the nickname of "Bulldog" among Loyalist troops. Cornwallis, who had occupied Charlotte in summer 1780 following the British capture of Charles Town, divided his army and gave command a Loyalist militia battalion to Ferguson.

On 18 August 1780 two hundred mounted Patriot partisans defeated 500 Loyalist regulars and militia, 300 of whom were on their way to join Ferguson, at the Battle of Musgrove Mill in Laurens County, South Carolina. Following the battle several Patriot commanders floated the idea of attacking the Loyalist stronghold at Ninety Six, South Carolina but hurriedly dispersed after hearing of the crushing American defeat at Camden on 16 August. Patriot forces under Colonel Isaac Shelby were pursued by Loyalist troops under Ferguson for 60 miles before managing to escape. The American victory at Musgrove Mill heartened local Patriots following the defeat at Camden.

Shelby's force crossed back over the Appalachian Mountains and fled to the territory of the Watauga Association at Sycamore Shoals. On 2 September Ferguson, leading a force of Loyalists, began marching west toward the Appalachian Mountains in pursuit of Shelby and his troops. By 10 September Ferguson had established a camp at Gilbert Town, North Carolina and allegedly issued a challenge to the Patriot leaders to lay down their arms or otherwise he would "lay waste to their country with fire and sword." Shelby and Colonel John Sevier met and agreed to combine their forces against Ferguson's. On 25 September Shelby, Sevier and fellow colonel Charles McDowell combined the 600 Overmountain Men they collectively commanded with 400 Virginia militia under Colonel William Campbell at the Sycamore Shoals.

Ferguson being shot and injured at the Battle of Kings Mountain

On 7 October a Patriot force of 910 militia clashed with Ferguson's army of 1,125 Loyalist regulars and militia at King's Pinnacle in the Battle of Kings Mountain. The battle went badly for the Loyalists, who were positioned high on the mountain ridge, though Ferguson rode back and forth to encourage his men. During the fighting Ferguson was shot from his horse and with his foot still in the stirrup was dragged to the Patriot side. When a Patriot officer approached Ferguson for his surrender the major drew his pistol and shot him before being immediately being killed by angered Patriot soldiers, who stripped Ferguson's body of clothing and urinated on him before burial. The Patriots buried Ferguson in an oxhide near the site of his death, and Colonel Benjamin Cleveland claimed Ferguson's white stallion as a prize of war and rode it home to his estate of Roundabout.

A female companion and possible mistress of Ferguson, Virginia Sal, was also killed in the battle and was buried with the officer. In the 1920s, the U.S. government erected a marker at Ferguson's gravesite, which today is a part of the Kings Mountain National Military Park, administered by the National Park Service. Ferguson's personal correspondence reveals a man of intelligence, humour and charm. He also wrote several articles, satirical in tone, for publication in Rivington's Royal Gazette, under the pseudonyms Egg-Shell, Memento Mori and John Bull. He was survived by his mother, his brothers James and George, and sisters Annie, Elizabeth (Betty) (Mrs Scrymgeour-Wedderburn of Birkhill), and Jean.
