= Elizabeth Stewart (singer) =

Scottish singer (1939–2022)

Elizabeth Campbell Stewart
- Born: 13 May 1939; Fetterangus, Aberdeenshire
- Died: 13 October 2022
- Known for: Folk musician and singer from Aberdeenshire who championed Traveller folk traditions

Elizabeth Campbell Stewart (13 May 1939 to 13 October 2022) was a folk musician and singer from Aberdeenshire who championed Traveller folk traditions.

== Biography ==
Stewart was born in the village of Fetterangus, Aberdeenshire, to Jean and Donald Stewart. She was born into a family of musicians, which included her mother, Jean, and her aunt, Lucy Stewart. By the age of 3, Stewart was able to play “My Aul Wife an Your Aul Wife”, showing her musical talent from a young age.
