= James Ferguson, 1st Laird of Pitfour =

Scottish lawyer

James Ferguson (29 September 1672 – 1 January 1734) was a Scottish lawyer and was also the 1st Laird of Pitfour, a large estate in the Buchan area of north-east Scotland, which became known as 'The Blenheim of the North'. Prior to the purchase of the Pitfour estate, he had the honorific 'James Ferguson of Badifurrow', the estate he eventually inherited after his grandfather cut all ties with Ferguson's uncle, Robert Ferguson, who was in hiding to attempt to avoid treachery charges.

Ferguson was later known as the 'Sheriff', a reference to the post he held in Aberdeenshire from 1710. This helps differentiate him from men of subsequent generations bearing the same name. Although he was a staunch Jacobite, he had no compunction about purchasing lands forfeited by the Earl Marischal when these became available; Deer Abbey was also part of his portfolio.

He died at Slains Castle, the home of the Countess of Erroll, on 1 January 1734.

== Family and early life ==
Ferguson's surname is sometimes spelt as Fergusson, and he was initially known as James Ferguson of Badifurrow. He was born at Crichie, Garioch and was the son of William Ferguson, Laird of Badifurrow, who in turn was the younger brother of Robert Ferguson, who became known as 'the Plotter', and elder brother of Major General James Ferguson, who served at the Battle of Blenheim with the Duke of Marlborough.

Ferguson's mother was William's first wife, Jean Elphinstone. Ferguson's grandfather disinherited his eldest son, the Plotter, in favour of Ferguson's father. However, Ferguson's father died in 1694 while Old Ferguson was still alive, so Ferguson only became the heir apparent to the Badifurrow lands. By the time Old Ferguson died in 1699, Ferguson was already practising law and he raised a court action requiring his uncle, the conspirator Robert Ferguson, to appear at court if he wished to challenge the inheritance; the Plotter was already in hiding because of his treachery against the crown so did not appear, consequently the court confirmed Ferguson's inheritance in mid June 1700.

In 1697 Ferguson married Ann Stuart. Their first child, a daughter who they named Elizabeth, was born at Badifurrow in 1698. Ferguson's grandfather was still alive and lived with Ferguson and his family. In 1699 after his grandfather's death and on receipt of the court's confirmation of his inheritance, Ferguson promptly sold the lands at Badifurrow.

Ferguson purchased the Pitfour estate in 1700 so becoming the 1st Laird of Pitfour. This had been a timely purchase as his wife Ann Stuart was heavily pregnant with their second child, a son, also named James, who was born at Pitfour very soon after they moved in.

Although taking no part in the disturbances, the family were unfaltering Jacobites. However, Ferguson's Jacobite ideologies did not prevent him purchasing lands forfeited by the Earl Marischal at a knock-down price. When lands became available through the York Buildings Company he took full advantage of the reluctance of other landowners, who were afraid to be seen to exploit the downfall of fellow Jacobites, and bought extensively. It was during this time that he also acquired Deer Abbey.

== Pitfour ==
Ferguson became the 1st Laird of Pitfour when he purchased the estate in 1700 and held the title until his death in 1734. The lands purchased by Ferguson in 1700 were earlier recorded in a charter granted by Charles II in 1667 as encompassing "the lands and Barony of Toux and Pitfour in the Parish of Old Deer and Sheriffdom of Aberdeen including the towns and lands of Mintlaw, Longmuir, Dumpston in the Parish of Longside, and County of Aberdeen." There were several other lands individually listed, including "the Barony of Aden with the Tower, Fortaliss, Mains and Manor Place therof and pertinents of the same called Fortry, Rora Mill thereof, Croft Brewerie, Inverquhomrie and Yockieshill." The estate cost him in the region of 10,000 pound Scots, the equivalent of around £835, as the 18th-century rate of exchange was considered as twelve pound Scots to £1 sterling.

Over the years, Ferguson continued to add to the estate's portfolio and purchased land in Longside, Bruxie, New Deer and Old Deer. By this time the estate covered over 20,000 acres. He also secured other land at Old Deer and Aden on behalf of his nephew to add to the Kinmundy estate.

In his architectural guide to Banff and Buchan, Charles McKean describes the estate as the "Blenheim of Buchan" and "the Blenheim of Northern Scotland". The estate was further expanded and developed by Ferguson's son, Lord Pitfour and grandson the third Laird before being decimated by the extravagance of successive generations.

== Career ==
Ferguson was admitted to the Faculty of Advocates in 1697 after studying law at Edinburgh University. He was also a member of the Society of Writers to the Signet. He established a flourishing law practice and one of his clients was his uncle Major General James Ferguson of Balmakelly. Ferguson visited the Major General, who was fighting in Maastricht, in 1704 and drew up his will. At the end of October 1705 the Major General died suddenly in suspicious circumstances and Ferguson was his executor. He organised the purchase of the Kinmundy estate for the Major General's successor, his ten-year-old son. The Kinmundy estate was adjacent to Ferguson's own Pitfour land.

The 1st Laird is usually referred to as 'the Sheriff' to help differentiate between the generations, as men of the next three generations were named James Ferguson. Despite Aberdeenshire Sheriff Court records not showing the 1st Laird in this appointment, the Society of Advocates did recognise him as such. The family records of the clan Ferguson also record him as being appointed Sheriff Depute of Aberdeenshire in 1710. Writing in 1878 Davidson attributes him as Sheriff Substitute to his cousin Sir John Elphinstone of Logie.

John Ramsay of Ochtertyre is reported to have stated in his memoirs that "James Ferguson, Laird of Pitfour, having been an adventurer in the South Sea, would have been a ruined man, but for his son's exertions." Wilson-Smith attributes this to mean Ferguson had lost a great deal of money by investing in the South Sea Company but the expansive lands Ferguson had procured were sufficient to withstand the debts until the situation was fully remedied in later years by the financial acumen of his son.

The 1st Laird died while visiting the Countess of Erroll at her home, Slains Castle, on New Year's Day in 1734. He is buried in the kirkyard at Old Deer and the epitaph on his headstone reads:

Beneath this stone lies buried James Ferguson of Pitfour, advocate in the supreme courts of the realm, endowed with a rare kindness of heart. He left two children, a son and a daughter. Born on the Feast of St. Michael and All Angels [29 September] 1672. Died on the Feast of the Circumcision of our Lord and Saviour, Jesus Christ [1 January] 1734. James Ferguson, his son, caused this stone to be placed here in dutiful affection toward a parent who well deserved it.

His successor was his son, also James, who went on to become Lord Pitfour.
