= James Ferguson (Scottish politician) =

Scottish politician & 3rd Laird of Pitfour (1735 – 1820)

James Ferguson 3rd Laird of Pitfour
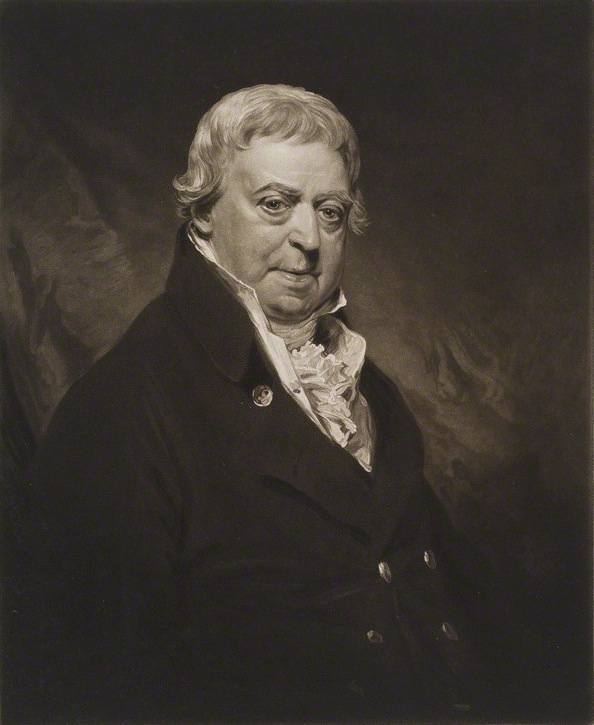
- A mezzotint portrait of Ferguson by William Ward, after Sir William Beechey, published 1818

Member of Parliament for Aberdeenshire
- In office 1790–1820
- Preceded by: George Skene
- Succeeded by: William Gordon

Member of Parliament for Banffshire
- In office 1789–1790
- Preceded by: Sir James Duff
- Succeeded by: Sir James Grant, Bt

Personal details
- Born: 25 May 1735 Pitfour, Aberdeenshire, Scotland,
- Died: 6 September 1820 (aged 85)
- Occupation: Advocate and politician

James Ferguson FRSE (25 May 1735 – 6 September 1820) was a Scottish advocate and Tory politician and the third Laird of Pitfour, a large estate in the Buchan area of north east Scotland, which is known as the 'Blenheim of the North'.

Ferguson studied law in Edinburgh, qualifying in 1757 to gain membership of the Faculty of Advocates. He then undertook a tour of Europe throughout 1758 before following in his father's footsteps by joining the Scottish legal profession. Later in life his interests turned to politics and he became a Scottish Tory politician.

Among the extensive work carried out by Ferguson at Pitfour, he is also credited with beginning work on a canal between the Pitfour estate and the sea at Peterhead in order to transport agricultural produce. Despite planning objections from neighbours, work began in 1797. He is also credited with establishing the planned village of Mintlaw in 1813.

== Ancestry and early life ==
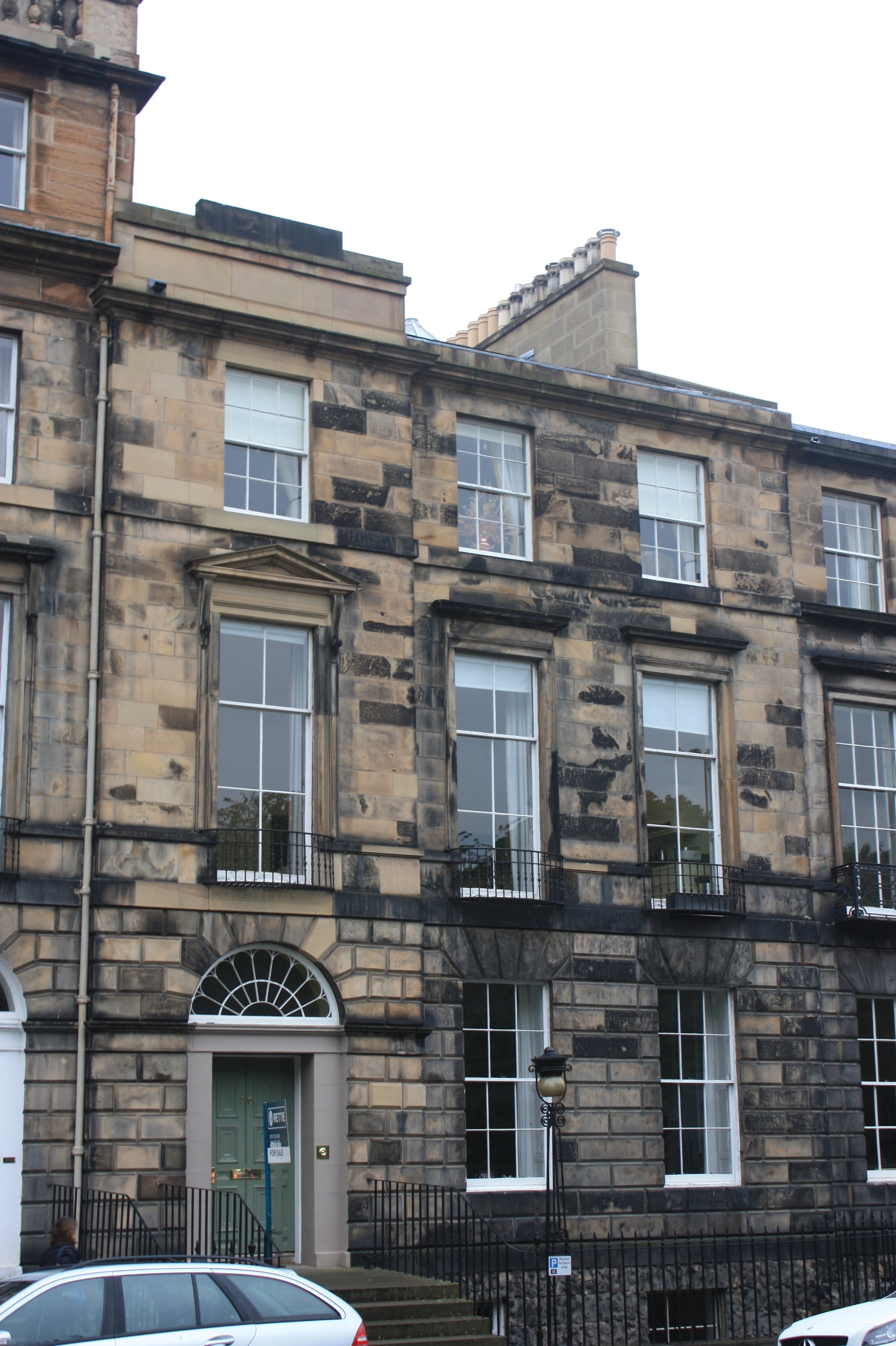
30 Heriot Row, Edinburgh

James Ferguson was born at Pitfour on 25 May 1735. He was the eldest son of James Ferguson (1700–1777) and Ann Murray (1708–1793). His parents were married on 3 February 1733, and he was born three years later. They had five other, younger children.

Before undertaking a grand tour of Europe during 1758, Ferguson continued the family tradition of studying law in Edinburgh. After qualifying, he gained membership of the Faculty of Advocates and Society of Writers to the Signet in July 1757.

Ferguson spent a great deal of time at Pitfour but also had an apartment in St James Place, Westminster, Middlesex. Ferguson became the third Laird of Pitfour on the death of his father, Lord Pitfour, in 1777.

The Third Laird was a known associate of James Boswell and together with his brother Patrick, who was the designer of the Ferguson rifle, breakfasted with Boswell in November 1762. Other close associates were William Pitt the Younger and Henry Dundas, 1st Viscount Melville. He was the Rector at Aberdeen University from 1794 to 1796.

In a confidential report titled "View of the political state of Scotland" published in 1788, Ferguson was described as "a man of real good sense, but indolent." The document was published in 1887 but covered the personal circumstances of those involved in county elections in Scotland during the previous century. Ferguson was not a good-looking man and appeared plain, small and stocky. His mother once wrote to him:

Never expose yourself, James, to the charge of rape, for your broad shoulders will cause the jury to think it probable that you made the attempt, and your face will make it manifest that it must have been against the will.

He remained a bachelor although there was speculation he yearned for Jane Gordon, Duchess of Gordon. She was born in Edinburgh in 1749, and was a Scottish Tory political hostess who was shrewd, sharp-witted and humorous but good-natured. In a riddle written by the Duchess, the last two lines refer to Ferguson (Laird of Pitfour) and confirm that he was not an attractive man. It reads:

My first is found upon the banks of Tyne
My second is scarce quite half of nine
My whole a laird of Aberdeenshire race
An honest fellow with an ugly face

Around 1813, he established the planned village of Mintlaw, and he is also credited with expanding Longside in 1801.

Prior to his death his Edinburgh address was 30 Heriot Row in the Second New Town.

He died without issue, and on his death in St James' Place, London, in September 1820, the estate passed to his younger brother, George Ferguson (1748–1820), who was then 72 years old and in poor health. He was said to have died "without a struggle" of "apoplexy".

== Political career ==
Ferguson became a Scottish Tory politician. He sat in the House of Commons of Great Britain from 1788 to 1800, and then in the House of Commons of the United Kingdom until his death in 1820.

He unsuccessfully contested Aberdeenshire at a by-election in 1786 with the support of the Duke of Gordon. George Skene—proposed by the Earl of Fife, who held tremendous sway in the political circles of that time—defeated him. The total electorate for Aberdeenshire was 190, and Ferguson was defeated by ten votes. Ferguson was again nominated for Aberdeenshire in July 1790 and was appointed after Skene withdrew when his alcoholism began to blight his political career.

Ferguson was elected as the Member of Parliament (MP) for Banffshire at a by-election in 1789, holding that seat until 1790. He was elected at the 1790 general election as MP for Aberdeenshire, and held that seat until his death 30 years later.

The Member became a close associate and political friend of the Prime Minister William Pitt the Younger. After Pitt's death in 1806, Ferguson did not so easily retain his seat in Parliament. In the elections of 1806, he retained the seat by just two votes, and his opponent General Alexander Hay demanded he be investigated for bribery and corruption. Ferguson again beat Hay in the contest for the seat in June 1807, but this time with a more convincing majority of 54 to 39 votes. Ferguson was unopposed in the next three elections. Some records indicate that Ferguson never spoke in the Commons except to complain about a broken window behind his seat causing a draught. He is actually recorded as speaking on at least five occasions over the years.

The diarist and fellow lawyer Henry Crabb Robinson gave an indication of Ferguson's political party affiliation when he recorded in his diary of 1826:

Late at the Athenaeum. Hudson Gurney was there. He related with great effect the experience of Ferguson of Pitfour, which he used to repeat when an old man, for the benefit of young Members: 'I was never absent from any division I could get at. I have heard many arguments which convinced my judgement, but never one that influenced my vote. I never voted but once according to my own opinion, and that was the worst vote I ever gave. I found that the only way to be quiet in Parliament was always to vote with the ministers, and never to take a place'.

It was not until after 1832 and the introduction of the Scottish Reform Act 1832 that control of Scottish politics was taken from the hands of landowners and a small number of merchants. The Friends of the People Society in the 1790s was opposed by those landed gentry politicians. After the Act came into effect, the constituencies were changed, and this raised the electorate from under 5,000 to 65,000.

== Pitfour ==
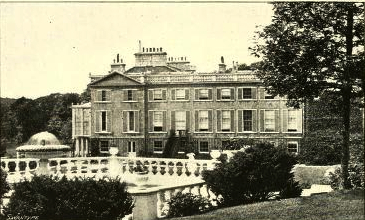
Side view of Pitfour House around the late 1800s

The Pitfour Estate beside Mintlaw in the Buchan area of north-east Scotland became one of the country's most extensive and lavish estates during the 18th and 19th centuries. The Pitfour estate is shown on old maps as Petfouir or Petfour. The estate was purchased by Ferguson's grandfather, the first Laird, in 1700 and was developed and extended by both the Sheriff and Lord Pitfour. Covering a large area of Buchan, the policies stretched to around 50 square miles and would be valued at £30m at its peak in the 18th century. The third Laird is attributed with much of the development work on the mansion house which was designed by architect John Smith in 1809. In his architectural guide to Banff and Buchan, Charles McKean describes the estate as the "Blenheim of Buchan" and "the Blenheim of Northern Scotland".

Pitfour's canal and lake

Ferguson was Laird of Pitfour during the period known as the Industrial Revolution in Britain. He began work on a canal between Pitfour and Peterhead in 1797 despite major opposition from adjoining landowners. The canal was proposed to cover about ten miles following the course of the River Ugie. References also refer to Pitfour's canal as the St Fergus and River Ugie Canal. A project Ferguson had considered since 1793, it was never completed owing to "difficulties in effecting the necessary arrangements with neighbouring heritors." The objections were particularly raised by the Merchant Maiden Hospital, which owned the land on the south side of the Ugie. Despite being advised to take out an interdict to prevent the work, in January 1797 the Hospital did not feel it had a strong enough case. However, four months later when two miles of the canal had been dug up to where the north and south Ugie joined, the Hospital did apply for an interdict, and this was granted in July 1797.

A few years after starting work on the canal, the Member had an artificial lake built on a flat piece of land to the front of the mansion house. The landscape gardener William S Gilpin was carrying out work on the adjacent Strichen estate at about the same time, and it is assumed he gave help with the work at Pitfour. The lake extends to almost 50 acres and was based on the artificial lake at Windsor Great Park.

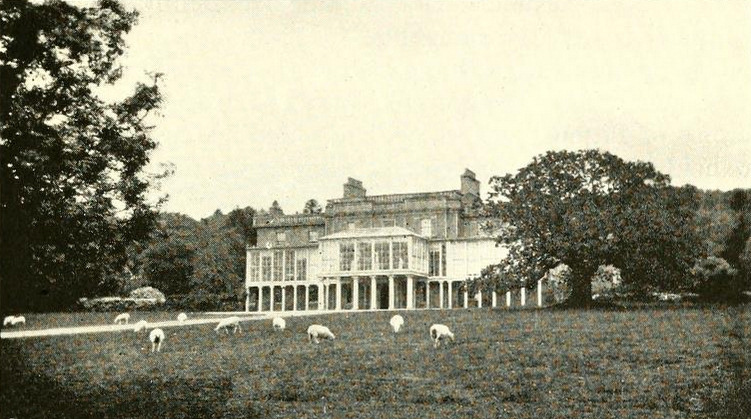
Pitfour House around the late 1800s

Later history of the estate

After the death of the Member intestate in 1820, the estate was inherited by his younger brother George Ferguson (1748–1820), who died shortly after inheriting the estate. He was succeeded by his illegitimate son George Ferguson who, despite incurring severe debts, continued to develop the estate by adding a stable block, race course, an observation tower and other follies. He had huge gambling debts, and although the estate had been valued at £300,000 when he inherited it, he sold off many of the farms and other parts of the estate to raise funds. Despite these injections of funds, when he died the estate was mortgaged to the extent of £250,000. It was further decimated by his son, George Arthur Ferguson (1835–1924). George Arthur was sequestrated, and what remained of the estate was marketed in 1909. It was eventually sold in mid-1926, and the mansion house was knocked down.

Parliament of Great Britain
Preceded by Sir James Duff	Member of Parliament for Banffshire; 1789–1790	Succeeded by Sir James Grant, Bt
Preceded by George Skene	Member of Parliament for Aberdeenshire; 1790–1800	Succeeded by Parliament of the United Kingdom
Parliament of the United Kingdom
Preceded by Parliament of Great Britain	Member of Parliament for Aberdeenshire; 1801–1820	Succeeded by William Gordon
