= James Ferguson (Scottish general) =

Scottish major-general

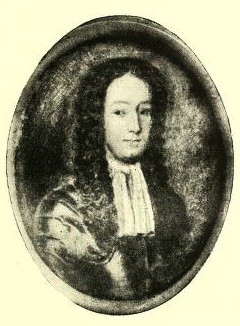
- James Ferguson of Balmakelly
- Born: Aberdeenshire, Scotland, UK
- Died: 1705
- Occupations: Major General, Colonel of the Cameronian regiment

James Ferguson (before 1677–1705) of Balmakelly and Kirtonhill, Kincardineshire, was a Scottish major-general, colonel of the Cameronian regiment.

Ferguson was the third son of William Ferguson, laird of Badifurrow, who represented Inverurie in the first Scottish parliament after the Restoration, remembered for its demonstrative loyalty as the ‘drunken parliament.’ James was a younger brother of Robert Ferguson 'the Plotter'.

== Military career ==
Ferguson appears to have entered the Scots brigade in the pay of Holland, probably as a gentleman volunteer, sometime during the reign of Charles II. His first commission, that of quartermaster in Colonel Macdonald's battalion of the brigade, was dated 12 June 1677. He became an ensign in the battalion in September 1678, and lieutenant in February 1682. His battalion was one of those brought over to England in 1685 at the time of Monmouth's rebellion. He became captain in 1687, and in 1688 landed with William of Orange at Torbay. His regiment, then known as Balfour's, afterward as Lauder's, was one of those first landed, and soon after despatched from London to Leith under Mackay. The fight at Killiecrankie, where he is said to have been taken prisoner, left him a regimental major; and in March 1690 he was despatched by General Mackay, who described him as 'a resolute, well-affected officer,’ in whose discretion and diligence he had full reliance, at the head of six hundred men, to reduce the western isles, a service he accomplished satisfactorily with the aid of the Glasgow authorities and the co-operation of Captain Pottinger of the Dartmouth frigate (Ferguson, pp. 15–16).

In 1692 he was back in the Low Countries and was present with his regiment (Lauder's) at the battle of Steenkirk. A few days after, on 1 August 1692, he was appointed lieutenant-colonel of Monro's (late Angus's, now the 1st Cameronians, Scottish rifles), which at the time was in Dutch pay. Ferguson led the regiment at the battle of Landen and the siege of Namur. On 25 August 1693, he had been appointed to the colonelcy, which he held up to his death. Owing to the reductions after the peace of Ryswick the regiment was retained in the Netherlands, (Note: Historically, the Netherlands were inaccurately described as 'Holland' and Holland is used in many older references.) but in December 1700 it was finally transferred to the British service, and was brought to Scotland. Ferguson had meanwhile married and been left a widower, and had acquired the estates of Balmakelly and Kirtonhill, on the Kincardineshire bank of the North Esk. Ferguson went with his regiment to the Netherlands under Marlborough in 1702. In 1703 he was in command at 's-Hertogenbosch, (Note: Bois-le-Duc is the French translation for 's-Hertogenbosch and was frequently the term used in older British writing.) with the rank of brigadier-general. In the campaign of 1704 he commanded a brigade that led the attack on the heights of Schellenberg, and at Blenheim shared with Row's brigade the protracted fighting around the strongest part of the enemy's position.

About Christmas the same year Ferguson married his second wife.

In the campaign of the year following he had a brigade at the forcing of the enemy's lines in Brabant, and afterward commanded, with the rank of major-general, at 's-Hertogenbosch, where he died very suddenly—the family tradition says by poison—on 22 Oct. 1705. An old manuscript states that 'he served in four reigns, still maintaining the character of a brave, valiant, and prudent officer, until, his fame raising envy in the breast of the then commanding officer, he was cut off by very sinister means' (ib. p. 46). Contemporary writers are discreetly silent on this ugly story, but all agree in regretting his loss as a brave and experienced officer. He was buried in St. Jan's Kerk, (Note: Also known as St John's Cathedral or Sint-Janskathedraal. The history of the Cathedral can be accessed in this book (in Dutch).) 's-Hertogenbosch, where there is a small tablet to his memory. There is also a memorial in Old Deer Churchyard.

== Personal life ==
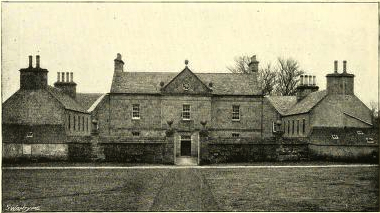
Kinmundy House, Aberdeenshire

Ferguson's first wife was Helen, daughter of James Drummond of Cultmalindie, Perthshire, by whom he had a son and daughter; his second, Hester Elizabeth, daughter of Abraham Hibelet, pastor of the Walloon Church, survived him and remarried Captain Hendrik Chombach. By her Ferguson had a daughter, who in 1730 married M. Gerard Vink, advocate, 's-Hertogenbosch. Ferguson's son James succeeded him and died in 1777. He was only ten years old when his father died. The General's will had been drawn up by his nephew James Ferguson and as executor, he sold the estates of Balmakelly and Kirtonhill and bought those of Kinmundy and Coynach, (now part of the settlement of Clola), Aberdeenshire (Burke, Landed Gentry, 1886, vol. i.), now held by his descendants. The Kinmundy estate was listed as extending to 4,068 acres with an annual income valued at £3,900 in 1883.
