= George Ferguson (Royal Navy officer) =

Royal Navy Admiral, politician and slave trade profiteer (1788–1867)

Admiral George Ferguson
- Born: April 1788; Edinburgh, Scotland
- Died: 15 March 1867 (aged 78); 37 Charles Street, Berkeley Square, London
- Burial place: Kensal Green Cemetery
- Relatives: George Ferguson (father)
- Military career
- Allegiance: United Kingdom of Great Britain and Ireland
- Branch: Royal Navy
- Service years: 1798–1867
- Rank: Admiral
- Commands: HMS Pylades; HMS Spey
- Conflicts: French Revolutionary Wars; Napoleonic Wars
- Other work: Member of Parliament for Banffshire

George Ferguson (April 1788 – 15 March 1867) was a Scottish officer of the Royal Navy. He served during the French Revolutionary and Napoleonic Wars, and rose to the rank of admiral. He was also a Tory politician who sat in the House of Commons from 1832 to 1837.

He was the fifth laird of Pitfour in Aberdeenshire from 1821 until his death in 1867.

== Family ==
Ferguson was the illegitimate son of George Ferguson (1748–1820) the fourth Laird of Pitfour, a large estate in the Buchan area of north east Scotland. His father was usually referred to as "the Governor" and Ferguson inherited the sizeable estate, money and also property in Trinidad and Tobago. As he shared the same name as his father, to help differentiate the two, he is generally known as the "Sailor" or the "Admiral", an acknowledgement of his naval career. Ferguson was the fifth laird of Pitfour and held the title from 1821 until 1867. He enjoyed a lavish lifestyle and squandered much of his inheritance gambling. In 1812 he married the heiress Elizabeth Holcombe and received an annuity from her wealthy father, John Woodhouse of Aramstone in Hereford. She died a few weeks after giving birth to their only child, a daughter, in early 1814.

His second marriage was on 7 April 1825. This was to Elizabeth Jane Rowley, the eldest daughter of Clotworthy Rowley, 1st Baron Langford and a niece of the Duke of Wellington. The couple had five children: four daughters – Frances Harriet, Georgina Harriet, Elizabeth Ann and Emily Ann – and a son, George Arthur.

== Career ==
In 1798, aged ten, Ferguson volunteered to join the navy but never actually served on HMS Vestal. He was midshipman on HMS Hussar, a 38-gun frigate before continuing his career on HMS Loire. At 17 years of age he was promoted to lieutenant. He continued to rise through the ranks until he left the service in September 1815, at age 27.

In November 1811, Ferguson was commander of the sloop HMS Pylades. Together with HMS Fly, the Pylades had towed two damaged ships to Peterhead harbour. Ferguson then went to visit his father at Pitfour. However, early the next morning while Ferguson was still ashore, the Pylades broke anchor and was grounded on rocks. Local inhabitants helped throw all the guns overboard and cut away the mast, which successfully re-floated it. The Admiralty refused Ferguson's request for a court-martial to clear his name.

Ferguson went back to sea after his first wife died shortly after giving birth in spring of 1814 and served on HMS Spey. He rose to the rank of rear-admiral in 1849, vice-admiral at the beginning of 1856 and admiral in February 1861 by which time he was 72 years of age.

Electoral reforms were scheduled to be enacted in 1832; Ferguson sought election for the Banffshire constituency in 1831 when only landowners were eligible. The seat was, however, retained by the sitting candidate. At the 1832 general election Ferguson was elected Member of Parliament (MP) for Banffshire. He held the seat until 1837.

According to the Legacies of British Slave-Ownership at the University College London, Ferguson was awarded a payment as a slave trader in the aftermath of the Slavery Abolition Act 1833 with the Slave Compensation Act 1837. The British Government took out a £15 million loan (worth £1.54 billion in 2025) with interest from Nathan Mayer Rothschild and Moses Montefiore which was subsequently paid off by the British taxpayers (ending in 2015). Ferguson was associated with "T71/891 Tobago no. 67", he owned 299 slaves in Tobago and received a £5,724 payment at the time (worth £589,080 in 2025).

== Death and legacy ==
Ferguson died in March 1867 at 37 Charles Street, in Berkeley Square, London, a mansion he had purchased from the Marquess of Bute a number of years earlier despite his financial difficulties. He is buried in a family vault at Kensal Green Cemetery. His second wife and two unmarried daughters are also buried there. His estate passed to his son, George Arthur.

Parliament of the United Kingdom
Preceded by John Morison	Member of Parliament for Banffshire; 1832 – 1837	Succeeded by James Duff
