= John Ramsay of Ochtertyre =

Scottish writer and antiquarian

John Ramsay of Ochtertyre FRSE FSAScot (1736–1814) was a Scottish writer and antiquarian. A renowned letter-writer even in his own lifetime, most of his extensive correspondence has since been lost. His home in Stirlingshire is near Blair Drummond, in the parish of Kincardine-in-Menteith. Sometimes referred to as Oughtertyre or Auchtertyre, it is not to be confused by the larger Ochtertyre estate in Perthshire, owned by the Murray family.

== Life ==
He was born at Ochtertyre House on 26 August 1736 the son of Anne Dundas, daughter of General Ralph Dundas of Manor, and her husband, James Ramsay WS (d.1748), a lawyer. Ramsay succeeded to his father's lairdship at the age of 12, in 1748. He was educated at Dalkeith Grammar School under a Mr Barclay, then studied classics at the University of Edinburgh. In the summers of 1752 and 1753 he spent much time at Menstrie Castle at the home of George Abercromby (1705-1800) where he spent time with the teenage Ralph Abercromby (who went on to a famous military career).

Ramsay then trained at his late father's law firm until he was admitted to the Faculty of Advocates, however he never practised.

He instead retired to the family estate at Ochtertyre House, on the south bank of the River Teith, to the east of Blair Drummond House in the parish of Kincardine-in-Menteith. Here “he lived a life of elegant ease, like a classical Roman in his villa, looking after his estate, observing life, reading and writing notes on 18th-century Scotland which eventually filled 10 folio volumes”. In 1785 he was elected a Fellow of the Royal Society of Edinburgh. His proposers were John Walker, James Hutton and Joseph Black. He was visited by Robert Burns in 1787, during Burns' visit to Harviestoun near Dollar, and was visited by Walter Scott in 1793. Scott's character, Jonathan Oldbuck in "The Antiquary" was based partly on Ramsay. He was also a friend of Lord Kames.

He died on 2 March 1814 and is buried in the parish churchyard of Kincardine-in-Menteith, slightly west of Ochtertyre House.

== Works ==
- Highland Vocal Airs (1784)
- Scotland and Scotsmen in the Eighteenth Century, 18 volumes
- Letters of John Ramsay of Ochtertyre, 1799-1812
- An account of the game of Curling, with Songs for the Canonmills curling club
- Lord Byron and his Times
