= Ferguson rifle =

Breech-loading rifle

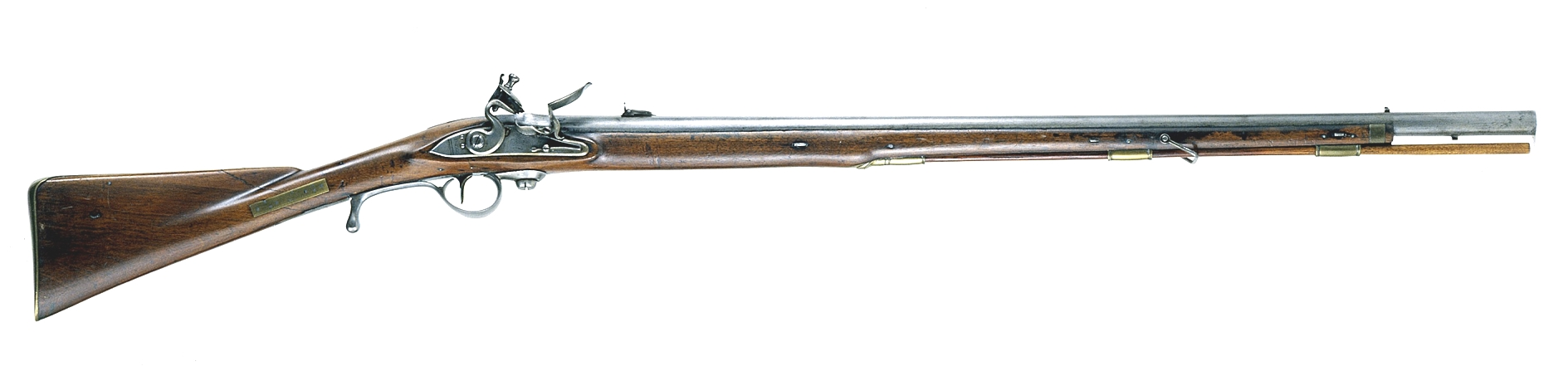
- A Ferguson rifle on display at the National Museum of American History
- Type: Breech-loading rifle
- Place of origin: Great Britain

Service history
- In service: 1777
- Used by: British Army
- Wars: American Revolutionary War

Production history
- Designer: Patrick Ferguson; John Cooper
- Designed: 1774
- Produced: 1776–1777
- No. built: 100

Specifications
- Mass: 7.5 lbs (3.5 kg)
- Length: various: 48 to 60 in (1,200 to 1,500 mm)
- Barrel length: 49 in (1,200 mm)
- Cartridge: .615 in (15.6 mm)
- Calibre: .650 in (16.5 mm)
- Action: single-shot
- Rate of fire: 6-8 rounds per minute
- Muzzle velocity: Variable
- Effective firing range: 200 and 300 yards (180 and 270 m) sights on the Ordnance Rifle
- Feed system: Breech-loaded

The Ferguson rifle is a breech-loading rifle manufactured between 1776 and 1777. Designed by Major Patrick Ferguson and the armourer John Cooper in 1774, the rifle fired a standard British carbine ball of .615" calibre and was one of the first breech-loading rifles to see military service. Adopted by the British army for use in the American Revolutionary War, approximately 100 rifles were produced and distributed to a newly-formed experimental light infantry unit, Ferguson's Corps of Riflemen, when it was raised in Spring 1777. The new unit fought in the Philadelphia campaign, including at the Battle of Brandywine, before being disbanded the day after the battle on 12 September 1777, with the rifles being put into storage.

The rifle, which was possibly used at the 1780 siege of Charleston, ultimately did not see mass adoption despite its vastly superior firepower due to being too expensive and time-consuming to produce along with being prone to becoming damaged while being difficult to maintain. Ferguson was killed at the Battle of Kings Mountain in 1780, ending the possibility of his rifle seeing further active service. Despite this the concept of rifle units would continue to be experimented with in the British Army, culminating in the raising of the Experimental Corps of Riflemen in 1800.

== Details ==
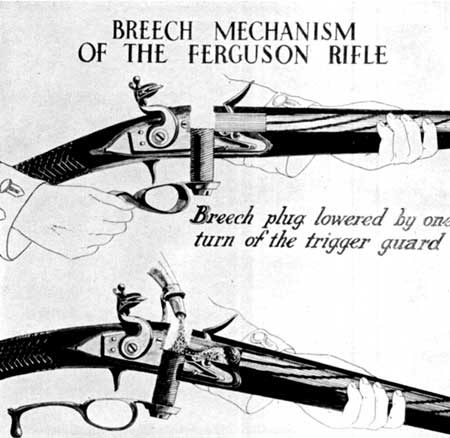
British Army manual for the Ferguson rifle

The breech of the weapon is closed by 11 starting threads on a tapered screw, and the trigger guard serves as the crank to rotate it. One complete turn dropped the screw low enough to drop a round ball into the exposed breech followed by a slight overcharge of powder, which was then sheared to the proper charge by the screw as it closed the breech. Since the weapon was loaded from the breech, rather than from the muzzle, it had an amazingly high rate of fire for its day, and in capable hands, it fired six to ten rounds per minute. To prove the potency of his invention, Patrick Ferguson conducted a series of tests in which he, with a high degree of accuracy, fired 6 shots per minute at a target 200 yards distant from a stationary position, and 4 shots per minute while advancing at a marching pace. He then wet the inside of the barrel, waited another minute, and then fired the weapon again, to prove its reliability regardless of weather conditions.

The action was adapted by Ferguson from a 1720 design by the Huguenot gunsmith Isaac de la Chaumette. Ferguson redesigned it in 1774 with the help of the head armourer at the Tower of London John Cooper and received an English patent in December of 1776 (number 1139) on details of the design.

Roughly one hundred of the rifles were manufactured by four British gunsmiths, Durs Egg being the most notable, and issued to Ferguson's unit when its members were drawn from the light companies of the infantry regiments serving in the army of Major General William Howe. The largest battle in which the rifles were used was the Battle of Brandywine, in which Ferguson was wounded. While he recuperated, his unit was disbanded the day after the battle. This was in no way due to "excessive losses" or any political machinations; the unit was an experiment, and the men were always slated to return to their original units.

Ferguson's men went back to the light infantry units they had originally come from, and his rifles were eventually replaced with the standard Brown Bess musket. But as most surviving Ferguson rifles known to exist in the US today were spoils of war taken north during the American Civil War, the usage of these weapons remain in dispute as to any possible deployment of Ferguson rifles in the southern theater of the American Revolutionary War.

The two main reasons that Ferguson rifles were not used by the rest of the army:

- The gun was difficult and expensive to produce using the small, decentralized gunsmith and subcontractor system in use to supply the British military during the late 18th century.
- The guns broke down easily in combat, especially in the wood of the stock around the lock mortise. The lock mechanism and breech were larger than the stock could withstand with rough use. All surviving military Fergusons feature a horseshoe-shaped iron repair under the lock to hold the stock together where it repeatedly broke around the weak, over-drilled out mortise.

However, despite an unsubstantiated claim that one of the actions was found at the battle site of Kings Mountain, South Carolina, where Ferguson was killed in action, the only piece of a Ferguson ever found in America from a gun used in action is a trigger guard found in excavations of a British Army camp in New York City. The only association the Ferguson rifle has with the Battle of Kings Mountain is that Ferguson was there.

Experience with early modern replicas, made before the proper screw and thread pitch of the breechblock were rediscovered, seemed to indicate that while reloading was rapid, it seemed to be necessary to first lubricate the breech screw (originally with a mixture of beeswax and tallow) or else the (replica) rifle would foul so much that it needed cleaning after three or four shots. However, through the research efforts of DeWitt Bailey and others, the properly made reproduction Ferguson rifle, made according to Patrick Ferguson's specifications of the 1770s, can fire beyond sixty shots.

== See also ==
- British military rifles
- Whitworth rifle
- Needle gun
