= New Pitsligo =

Village in Aberdeenshire, Scotland

Coordinates: 57°35′33″N 2°11′50″W

New Pitsligo: Scottish Gaelic: Cabhach; Scots: Pitsligae; Cyaak
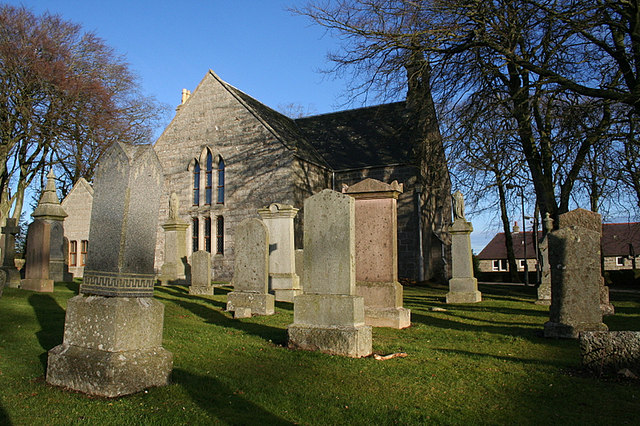
- Church of Scotland kirk in New Pitsligo

- Location within Aberdeenshire
- Population: 1,100 (2020)
- OS grid reference: NJ883557
- Council area: Aberdeenshire
- Lieutenancy area: Aberdeenshire
- Country: Scotland
- Sovereign state: United Kingdom
- Post town: FRASERBURGH
- Postcode district: AB43
- Police: Scotland
- Fire: Scottish
- Ambulance: Scottish
- UK Parliament: Aberdeenshire North and Moray East
- Scottish Parliament: Aberdeenshire East

New Pitsligo (Scots: Pitsligae), also known as Cavoch (locally Cyaak), is a village in Aberdeenshire, Scotland, near Fraserburgh.

== Overview ==
A small village in the North East of Scotland, it lies about 5 miles (8 km) inland from Pennan and around 10 miles (16 km) south-west of Fraserburgh on the A950. It has a sub-post office located in a convenience shop, a chip shop, tandoori restaurant and a Chinese takeaway. There is also a public library and a doctor's surgery. There are several parks in the village, two pubs, a car sales garage and a MOT and repair garage.

Pitsligo Arms Hotel, on High Street, was built in 1790 to provide accommodation for William Forbes upon his visits.

By 1864, the village had just under two thousand inhabitants; as of 2006, it was 907.

New Pitsligo is built on Turlundie Hill leading down to the valley between it and Balnamoon Hill. It looks on to Mormond Hill.

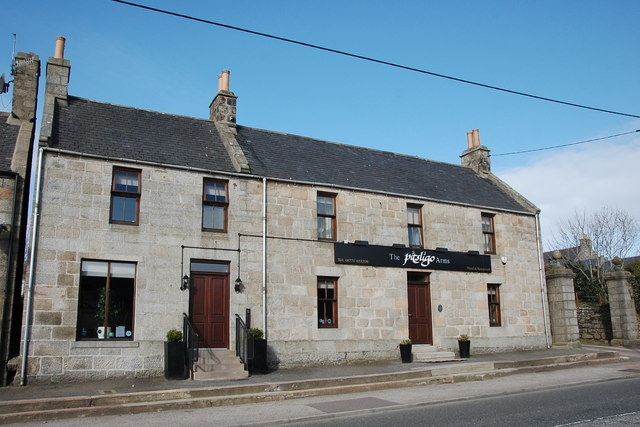
Pitsligo Arms Hotel, High Street, built in 1790

== History ==
The local area to the immediate south is rich with prehistory and historical features. There are found a number of prehistoric monuments including Catto Long Barrow, Silver Cairn and numerous tumuli. In that same vicinity of the Laeca Burn watershed is the point d'appui of historic battles between invading Danes and indigenous Picts.

Pitsligo was an area originally owned by the Lords Pitsligo, however after the Jacobite rising of 1745 these lands were forfeited because of the last Lord's support for the losing side. Part of the estate eventually passed to William Forbes of Monymusk who founded the village of New Pitsligo on the site of the existing hamlet of Cyaak. The boundaries of the original hamlet run roughly from the woods, where the small stream runs through the village, north towards the Fraserburgh end of the village. However now the village as a whole is referred under this name.

== Recreation ==
Although it is one of the bigger villages within the area, recreational facilities are limited. There is the village hall, which can be rented out to use for clubs and holds the long-standing Visual Arts Exhibition.

There is a football pitch, situated next to Low Street, which has changing rooms on site. Also below there is a second field, which in years past has been used as a playing field for youngsters and was provided with goals including nets. However these no longer exist. There is a third, small football pitch in one of the fields behind the school, which has recently been upgraded.

There is a local Freemason's Lodge which is situated in School Street. Established in 1872.

== Employment ==
Historically, many people from the village were employed in quarrying for granite.

Also, many people worked on the peat moss which lies in the area between the east of the village and Strichen.

The village is also famous for New Pitsligo lace.

== Notable people ==
- Robert Gordon Wilson (1844–1931), church architect
- Bill Gibb (1943-1988), fashion designer
- Patrick John Murdoch (1850-1940), Presbyterian minister and grandfather of Rupert Murdoch

== Bibliography ==
- McKean, Charles (1990), Banff & Buchan, Royal Incorporation of Architects in Scotland, ISBN 978-1-85158-231-0
