= Clola =

Village in Aberdeenshire, Scotland

Coordinates: 57.485°N 2.001°W

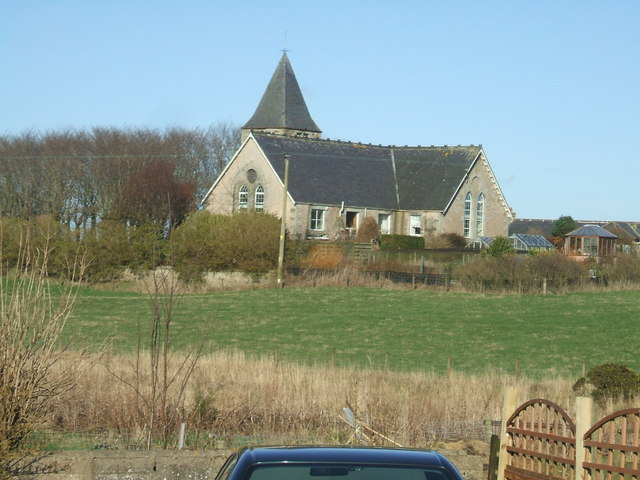
- Church Croft, Clola

- Location within Aberdeenshire
- OS grid reference: NK000438
- Council area: Aberdeenshire
- Lieutenancy area: Aberdeenshire
- Country: Scotland
- Sovereign state: United Kingdom
- Post town: PETERHEAD
- Postcode district: AB42
- Dialling code: 01771 (Mintlaw)
- Police: Scotland
- Fire: Scottish
- Ambulance: Scottish
- UK Parliament: Gordon and Buchan
- Scottish Parliament: Aberdeenshire East

Clola is a hamlet in Buchan, Aberdeenshire, Scotland. Clola is situated on the A952 road. There is considerable evidence of local habitation by early man in the vicinity of Clola. Some of these nearby human traces are evident in Catto Long Barrow, a massive stone structure now surrounded by agricultural fields.

== Geography and architecture ==
The scattered residential and farming community of Clola, about three miles north of Ardallie, is centred on Clola crossroads on the A952 some 2.5 miles south of Mintlaw. The neighbourhood extends to a radius of a little over a mile around the former Church. 18th century spellings are Clolloch and Clolah, which probably came from the Gaelic clach or clachach meaning stony place.

== Church ==
The church building stands to the east of the crossroads. While it is now a dwelling house, its exterior form has been retained, bearing witness to its original function. The first church at Clola was a simple heather thatched stone and clay structure on the opposite side of the A952, near the latter day manse. This was superseded in 1784 by a new building on the present site. In the secessions of the early 19th century Clola became part of the Free Church of Scotland, in opposition to the Established Church, and in keeping with its new status the church was rebuilt in its present form in 1864. The construction of the third church cost £1,500 and was mainly funded by donations from the congregation. The plans were drawn up by Campbell Douglas and James Stevenson from Glasgow. It featured a stained glass window to the memory of William Ferguson of Kinmundy, at one time chairman of the Great North of Scotland Railway Company and this window survives in the private dwelling. The Free Church re-united with the Church of Scotland in 1929. Population drifts in the post-War years led to Clola being linked with Ardallie, and this linked charge in turn finally united with Deer Parish on 4 May 1975. The last service at Clola had been held eight months earlier on 31 August 1974.

== Toll house ==
Quarter of a mile south of the Church is the former Toll House (Shannas Tollhouse). It is one of a small number of Tollhouses still used as a domestic dwelling and considered a good example of vernacular buildings. It sits adjacent to an old stretch of road beside the A952. Under the Turnpike Act of 1795 the minimum distance between toll bars was six miles. The Toll of Birness (the junction of the A952 Fraserburgh road and A92 Peterhead road) to the south of Ardallie is six miles from Clola. The Tollhouse is home to Shannas Gordon Setters which have produced many champions in the breed in both the UK and overseas. The Toll House has an Ordnance Survey cut mark, a basic type of Benchmark on the corner of the house.

== Shannas school ==
The former school for Clola primary children was Shannas School south of the Toll house on the A952. It closed in 1967 at a time of "educational re-organisation". Clola children are now educated at Mintlaw, which has two primary schools and an academy taking children through to their sixth year of secondary education.

== Durie ==
Half a mile east of Clola Church is the former weaver's hamlet of Durie. As elsewhere in Clola, modern homes have been built here in recent years. Durie is mentioned in records as far back as 1588, when it was spelt Dowrie. By 1600 the modern day spelling is adopted. The name is believed to come from the Gaelic dobhar or dobhran meaning a small stream, and the name Durie was originally applied to the Clola Burn which runs nearby.

== Kinmundy, Coynach and Shannas ==
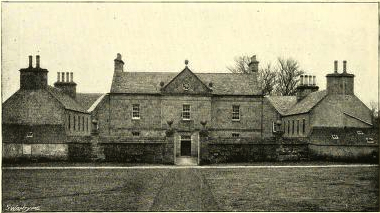
Kinmundy House, Aberdeenshire, before it was derelict

South of Durie is the site of Kinmundy House, once home to the Fergusons of Kinmundy. Like so many of Scotland's former mansion houses, the roof was removed (presumably for tax purposes) in the early 1950s, and part of the house was later converted into farm buildings. McKean describes Kinmundy House as being "classical 18th century".

To the west of Clola crossroads are Shannas Farm (which gave its name to the school), Brae of Coynach and Aulton of Coynach. Brae of Coynach is renowned for its herd of prime cattle, taking prizes at major events throughout the U.K. It is listed as category B by Historic Scotland. The house was built in 1851 to a design by Mackenzie and Matthews.

The road leads across to Skelmuir House, home in earlier times to a branch of the Gordon family.

== Recent history ==
The age of commuting and ease of travel have wrought many changes in Clola. Recent years have seen old properties modernised and new homes built, and as a community Clola is increasing in size. But businesses which once made itself supporting have gone. South of the church are the former Joiner's Croft and Smiddy (Smithy), and Church Croft was the site of Foggie's Shop seventy years ago. To the north is the former Meal Mill, which operated into the early 1960s. The dwelling on the right to the north of the meal mill was a shop and local post office until the late 1960s. A track on the left beyond this leads to the ruins of a shoemaker's shop and twelve cottages, abandoned in the 1920s, which housed workers employed at Millbreck Woollen Mill. Bridgestone Cottages were also built for mill workers. The Woollen Mill stood in the clump of mature trees by the roadside leading to Barnyards farm and was famed for the quality of its blankets, tweed, wood and Winsey aprons. The Millbreck Woollen Mill was established by Thomas and Joshua Smith when they commenced woollen manufacture in Millbreck Mill in 1818. The lease of the land there expired circa 1909 when they concentrated all work in Peterhead at their Kirkburn Mill. Barnyards today is home to a flock of Suffolk sheep. New enterprises have set up in more recent times; including an antique dealer, plant hire contractor, kennels, a joinery business, a pine furniture shop and a farm shop.

== See also ==
- Bogbrae
- Laeca Burn
- Cruden Bay
