= A950 road =

Road in Scotland

Coordinates: 57.521906185°N 1.95806431°W

A950

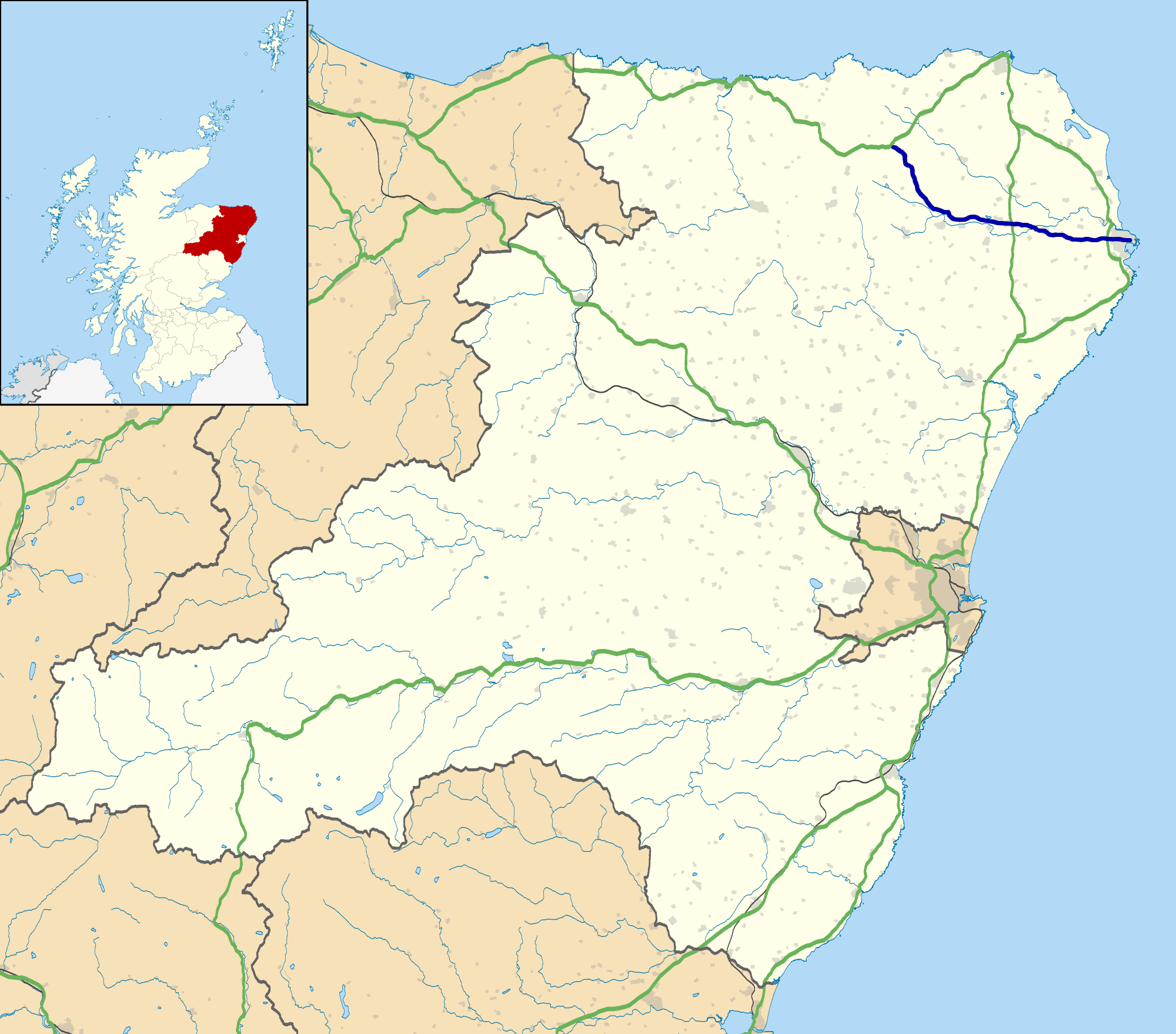

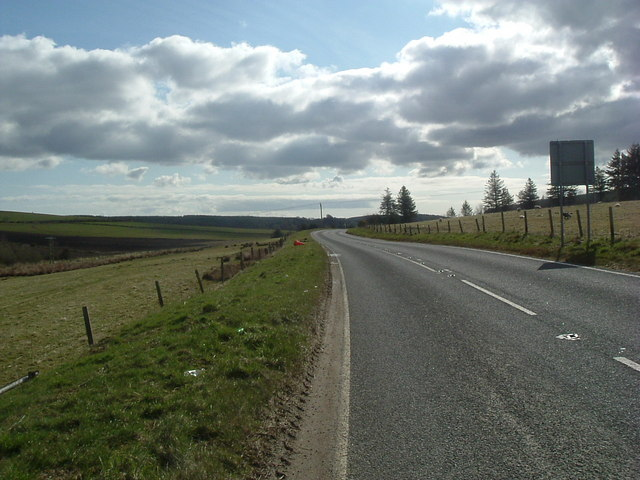
- Looking southeast along the A950 between Whitehill and Old Deer

Route information
- Length: 19.2 mi (30.9 km)

Major junctions
- Northeast end: A98
- A981 A952 (North Street/South Street); A90

- Southwest end: A982 (South Road/King Street)

Location
- Country: United Kingdom
- Primary destinations: New Pitsligo; Old Deer; Mintlaw; Longside; Peterhead

Road network
- Roads in the United Kingdom; Motorways; A and B road zones

The A950 is a road in rural Aberdeenshire, Scotland. It runs for 19.2 miles (30.9 km), and was first classified in 1922.

== Route ==
The road begins as an eastbound junction of the A98, just northwest of New Pitsligo. It continues southeast, passing through Craigculter and Whitehill. The A981 crosses it as an offset junction northeast of Brucklay. Approaching Old Deer, the road turns east, passing south of Pitfour Lake. It continues east through Mintlaw, as Main Street, where it crosses the A952 (as North and South Streets, respectively). On the eastern side of Longside, where the road is named Longside Road, it turns southeast again, a direction it maintains through Flushing, before turning east as it passes through Thunderton and Blackhills.

Southeast of Inverugie, the road crosses the A90, near the Howe o' Buchan, via a roundabout. Two more roundabouts (Waterside Road and Windmill Road/Meethill Road) follow in quick succession as it enters Peterhead as West Road.

The road terminates at another roundabout, this one shared with King Street and South Street (as the A982) and Kirk Street. It formerly terminated around 850 metres (2,790 ft) further east, travelling along King Street, Errol Street, Marischal Street (now pedestrianised) and Broad Street, before reaching Peterhead harbour at Seagate and Union Street.
