= Staging area =

Location where items are gathered before use

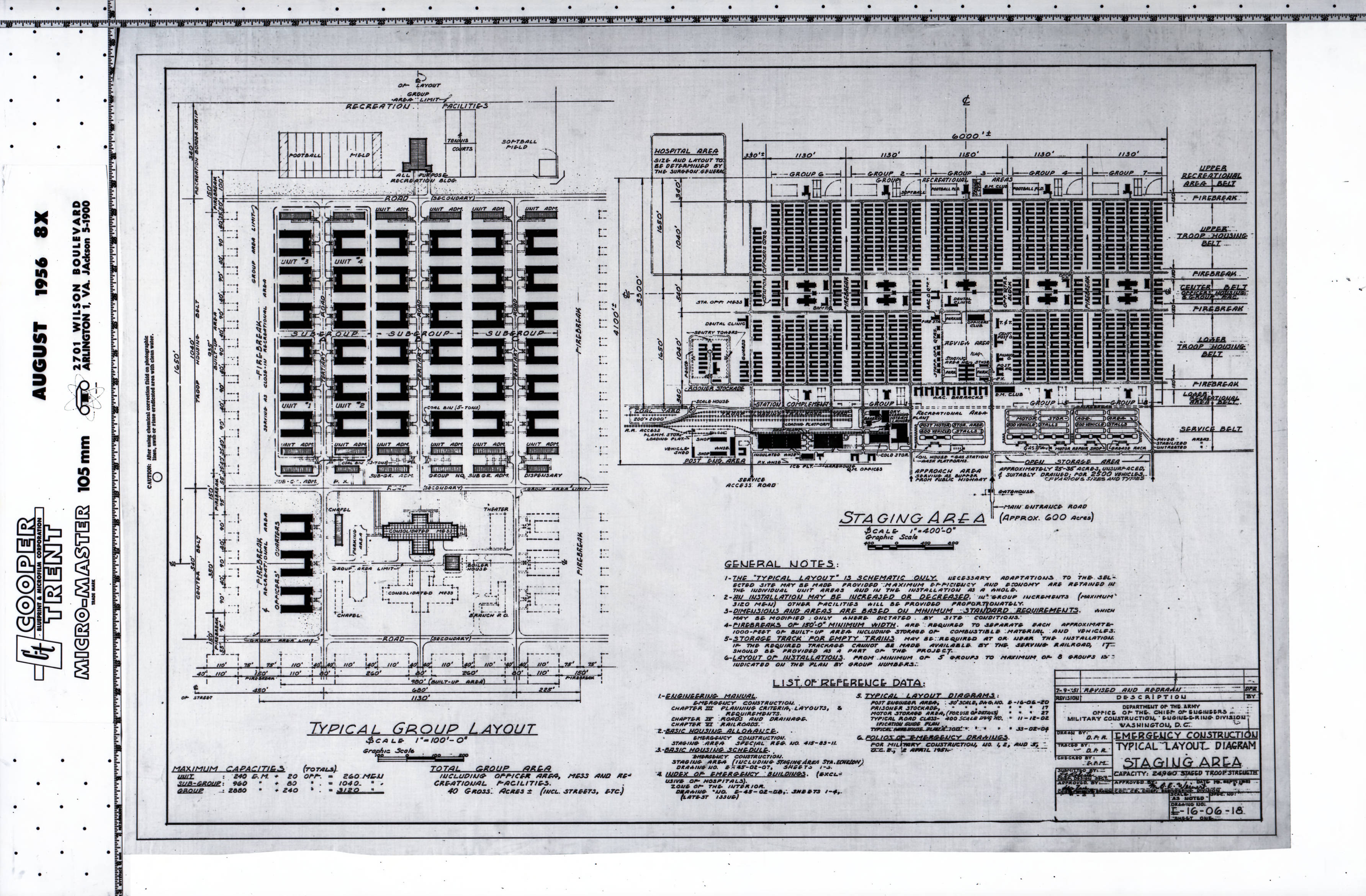
1951 US Army plan of a staging area designed for ~25,000 soldiers

A staging area (otherwise staging base, staging facility, staging ground, staging point, or staging post) is a location in which organisms, people, vehicles, equipment, or material are assembled before use. It may refer to:

- In aviation, a designated area where equipment can be staged prior to the arrival or departure of an aircraft.
- In construction, a designated area in which vehicles, supplies, and construction equipment are positioned for access and use to a construction site.
- In ecology, the resting and feeding places of migratory birds.
- In entertainment, places designated for setting up parades and other elaborate presentations.
- In real estate, the use of furniture to stage an area of one's home to prepare it for sale.
- In media, designated places for news conferences placed near locations of high media interest.
- In space exploration, an area where final assembly is done on space vehicles before they are moved out to their launch pad.
- In data management, an intermediate storage area between the sources of information and the data warehouse (DW) or data mart (DM). It is usually of temporary nature, and its contents can be erased after the DW/DM has been loaded successfully (see data staging).
- In software development, an environment for testing that exactly resembles a production environment. It seeks to mirror an actual production environment as closely as possible and may connect to other production services and data, such as databases.

In military usage, a staging area is a place where troops or equipment in transit are assembled or processed. The US Department of Defense uses these definitions:

(DOD) 1. Amphibious or airborne – A general locality between the mounting area and the objective of an amphibious or airborne expedition, through which the expedition or parts thereof pass after mounting, for refueling, regrouping of ships, and/or exercise, inspection, and redistribution of troops.

(DOD) 2. Other movements – A general locality established for the concentration of troop units and transient personnel between movements over the lines of communications. Also called SA. See also airborne; marshalling; stage; staging.

Often and historically, this military staging area has been termed a point d'appui, which is often on high ground and sometimes coincident with a significant prehistoric monument, as in the case of Catto Long Barrow in Aberdeenshire, Scotland. Unlike normal bases, the facilities of a staging area are temporary, mainly because for a certain time it will hold much more troops and materiel than would be reasonable in peacetime.

Militaries use staging areas to deploy military units, aircraft, and warships and materiel ahead of an attack or invasion. In former times, this used to be generally the border area of one's own country, but in recent wars (Gulf War, Kosovo War, Iraq War), it may also be the border area of another unrelated country granting access.

== See also ==
- List of aviation, avionics, aerospace and aeronautical abbreviations
- Glossary of military abbreviations
- List of government and military acronyms
- List of established military terms
- Military logistics
