= Wheelbarrow =

Small hand-propelled vehicle

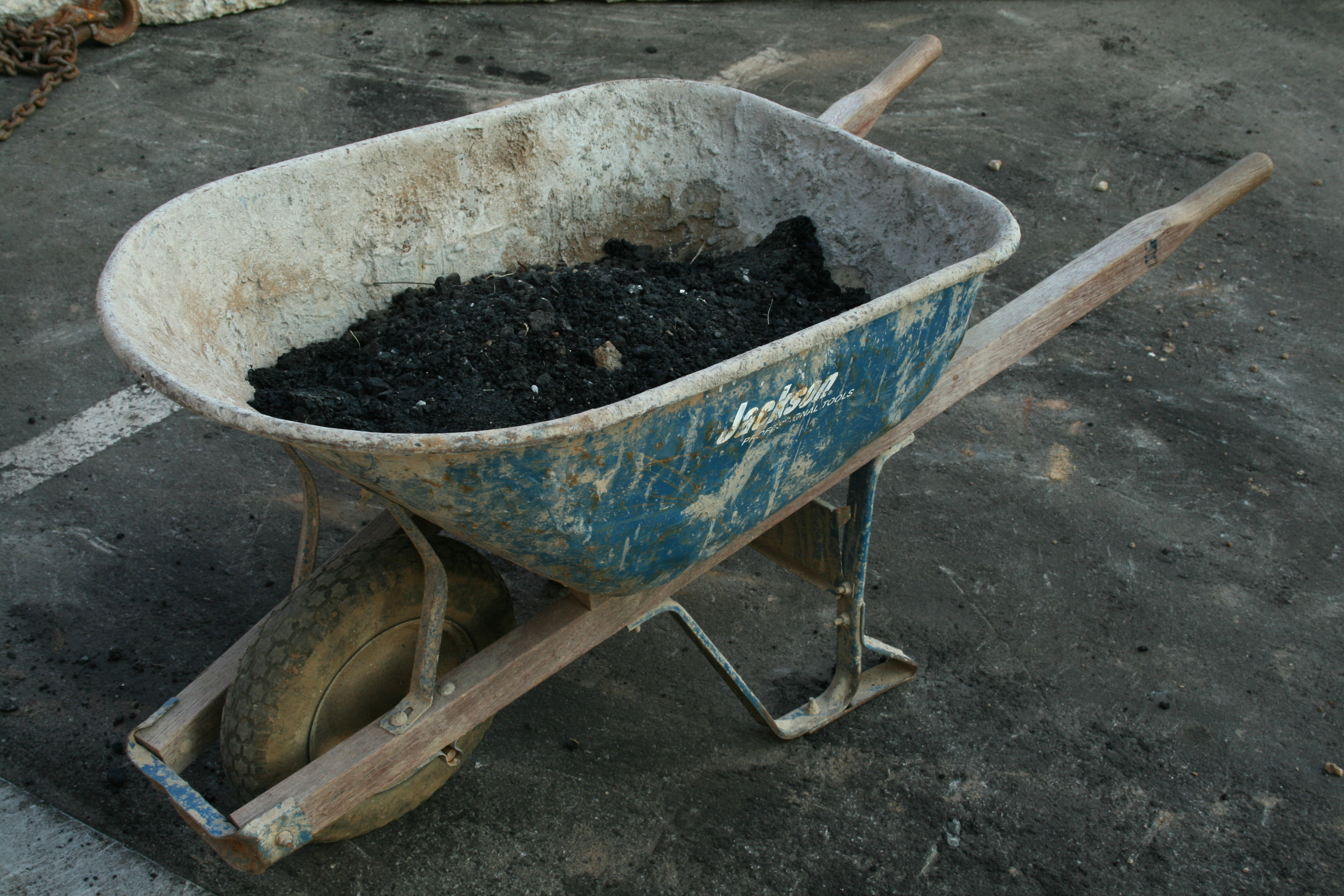
A common wheelbarrow

A wheelbarrow is a small hand-propelled load-bearing vehicle, usually with just one wheel, designed to be pushed and guided by a single person using two handles at the rear. The term "wheelbarrow" is made of two words: "wheel" and "barrow." "Barrow" is a derivation of the Old English "barew" which was a device used for carrying loads.

The wheelbarrow is designed to distribute the weight of its load between the wheel and the operator, so enabling the convenient carriage of heavier and bulkier loads than would be possible were the weight carried entirely by the operator. As such it is a second-class lever. Traditional Chinese wheelbarrows, however, had a central wheel supporting the whole load. Use of wheelbarrows is common in the construction industry and in gardening. Typical capacity is approximately 100 litres (3.53 cubic feet) of material.

A two-wheel type is more stable on level ground, while the almost universal one-wheel type has better maneuverability in small spaces, on planks, in water, or when tilted ground would throw the load off balance. The use of one wheel also permits greater control of the deposition of the load upon emptying.

== History ==
=== China ===
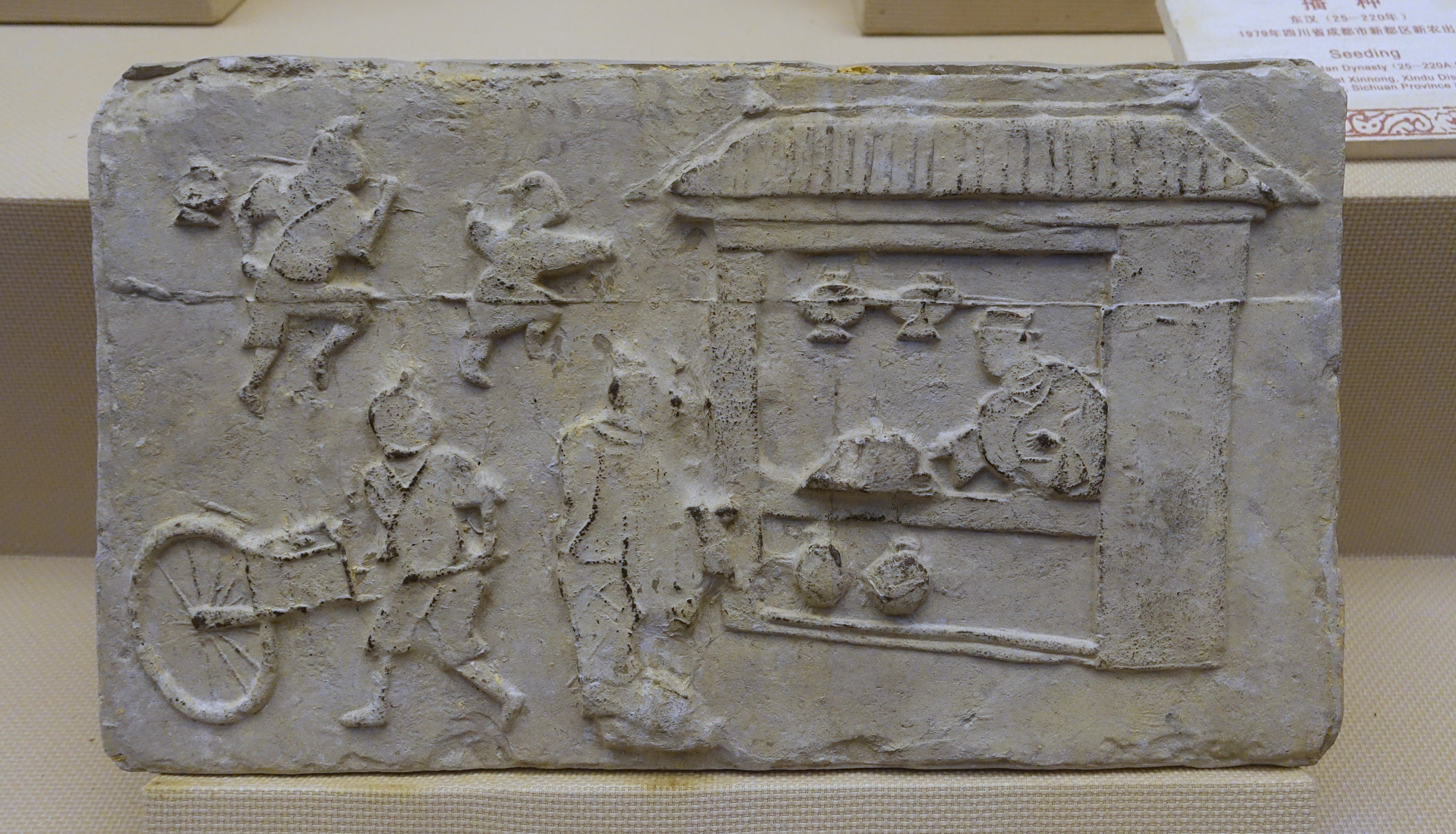
Han dynasty tomb brick showing a wheelbarrow

The earliest wheelbarrows with archaeological evidence in the form of a one-wheel cart come from second-century Han dynasty Emperor Hui's (d. 188 BC) tomb murals and brick tomb reliefs. The painted tomb mural of a man pushing a wheelbarrow was found in a tomb at Chengdu, Sichuan province, dated precisely to 118 AD. The stone carved relief of a man pushing a wheelbarrow was found in the tomb of Shen Fujun in Sichuan province, dated circa 150 AD. And then there is the story of the pious Dong Yuan pushing his father around in a single-wheel luche barrow, depicted in a mural of the Wu Liang tomb-shrine of Shandong (dated to AD 147). Earlier accounts dating to the 1st century BC and 1st century AD that mention a "deer cart" (鹿車, luche) might also have been referencing a wheelbarrow.

The 5th-century Book of Later Han stated that the wife of the once poor and youthful imperial censor Bao Xuan helped him push a lu che back to his village during their feeble wedding ceremony, around 30 BC. Later, during the Red Eyebrows Rebellion (c. 20 AD) against Xin dynasty's Wang Mang (45 BC–23 AD), the official Zhao Xi saved his wife from danger by disguising himself and pushing her along in his lu che barrow, past a group of brigand rebels who questioned him, and allowed him to pass after he convinced them that his wife was terribly ill. The first recorded description of a wheelbarrow appears in Liu Xiang's work Lives of Famous Immortals. Liu describes the invention of the wheelbarrow by the legendary Chinese mythological figure Ko Yu, who builds a "Wooden ox".

Nevertheless, the Chinese historical text of the Sanguozhi (Records of the Three Kingdoms), compiled by the ancient historian Chen Shou (233–297 AD), credits the invention of the wheelbarrow to Prime Minister Zhuge Liang (181–234 AD) of Shu Han from 197–234. It was written that in 231 AD, Zhuge Liang developed the vehicle of the wooden ox and used it as a transport for military supplies in a campaign against Cao Wei.

==== Centrally mounted wheel ====
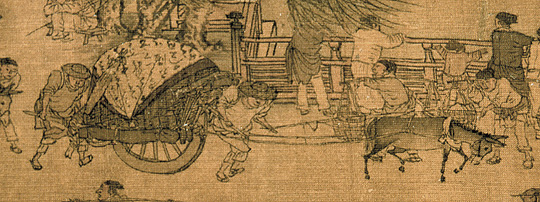
The one-wheeled Chinese wheelbarrow, from Zhang Zeduan's (1085–1145) painting Along the River During Qingming Festival, Song dynasty.

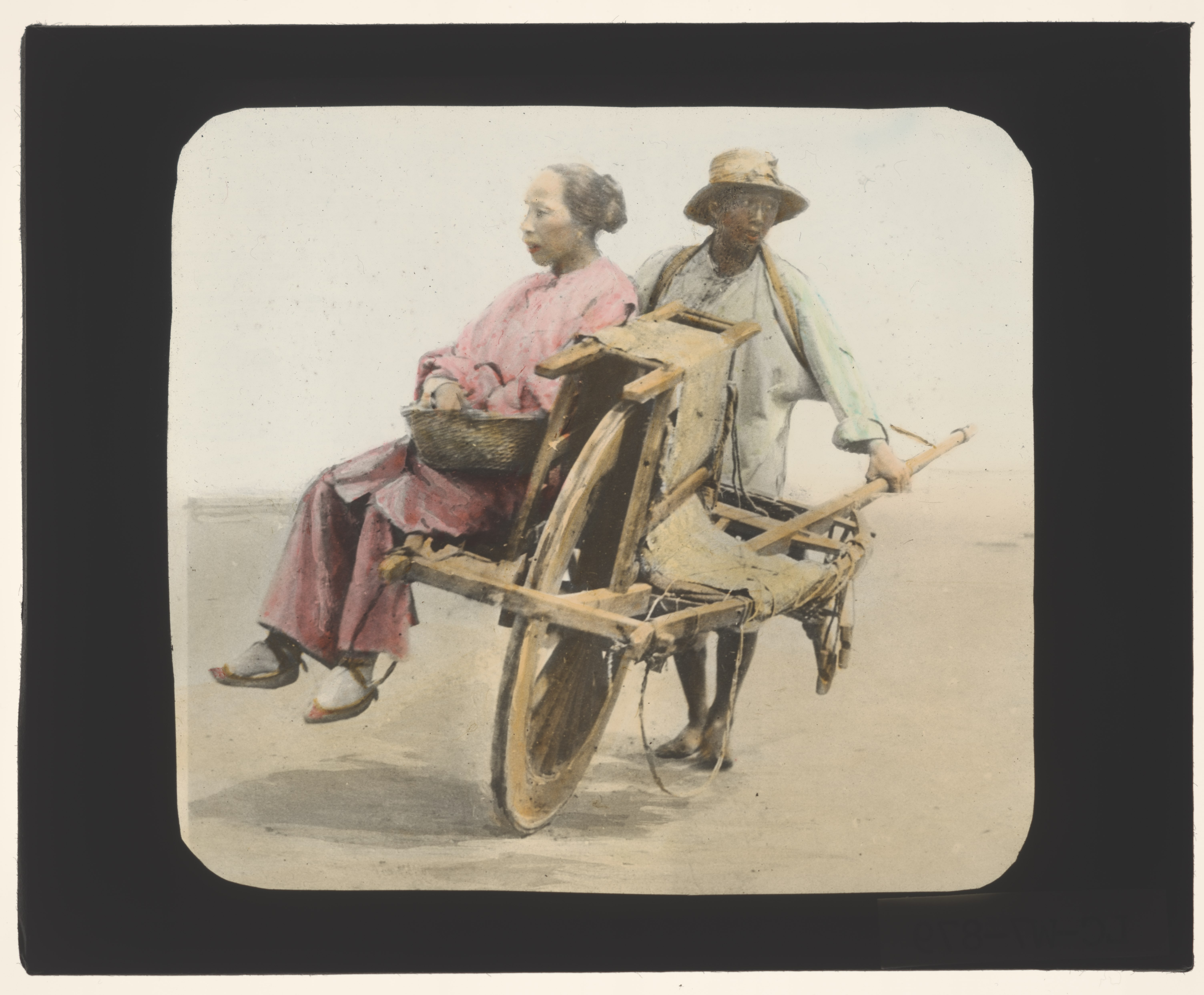
A wheelbarrow rickshaw under the Qing (1895)

Further annotations of the text by Pei Songzhi (430 AD) described the design in detail as a large single central wheel and axle around which a wooden frame was constructed in representation of an ox. Writing later in the 11th century, the Song dynasty (960–1279) scholar Gao Cheng wrote that the small wheelbarrow of his day, with shafts pointing forward (so that it was pulled), was the direct descendant of Zhuge Liang's wooden ox. Furthermore, he pointed out that the third century 'gliding horse' wheelbarrow featured the simple difference of the shaft pointing backwards (so that it was pushed instead).

Wheelbarrows in China came in two types. The more common type after the third century has a large, centrally mounted wheel. Prior types were universally front-wheeled wheelbarrows. The central-wheeled wheelbarrow could generally transport six human passengers at once, and instead of a laborious amount of energy exacted upon the animal or human driver pulling the wheelbarrow, the weight of the burden was distributed equally between the wheel and the puller. European visitors to China from the 17th century onwards had an appreciation for this, and it was given a considerable amount of attention by a member of the Dutch East India Company, Andreas Everardus van Braam Houckgeest, in his writings of 1797 (who accurately described its design and ability to hold large amounts of heavy baggage). These wheelbarrows continued in use into the twentieth century, and a good example of this is the 'Piepkar', which is a wheelbarrow on rails, and was found in Sumatra on Billiton Island. However, the lower carrying surface made the European wheelbarrow clearly more useful for short-haul work. As of the 1960s, traditional wheelbarrows in China were still in wide use.

==== Chinese sailing carriage ====
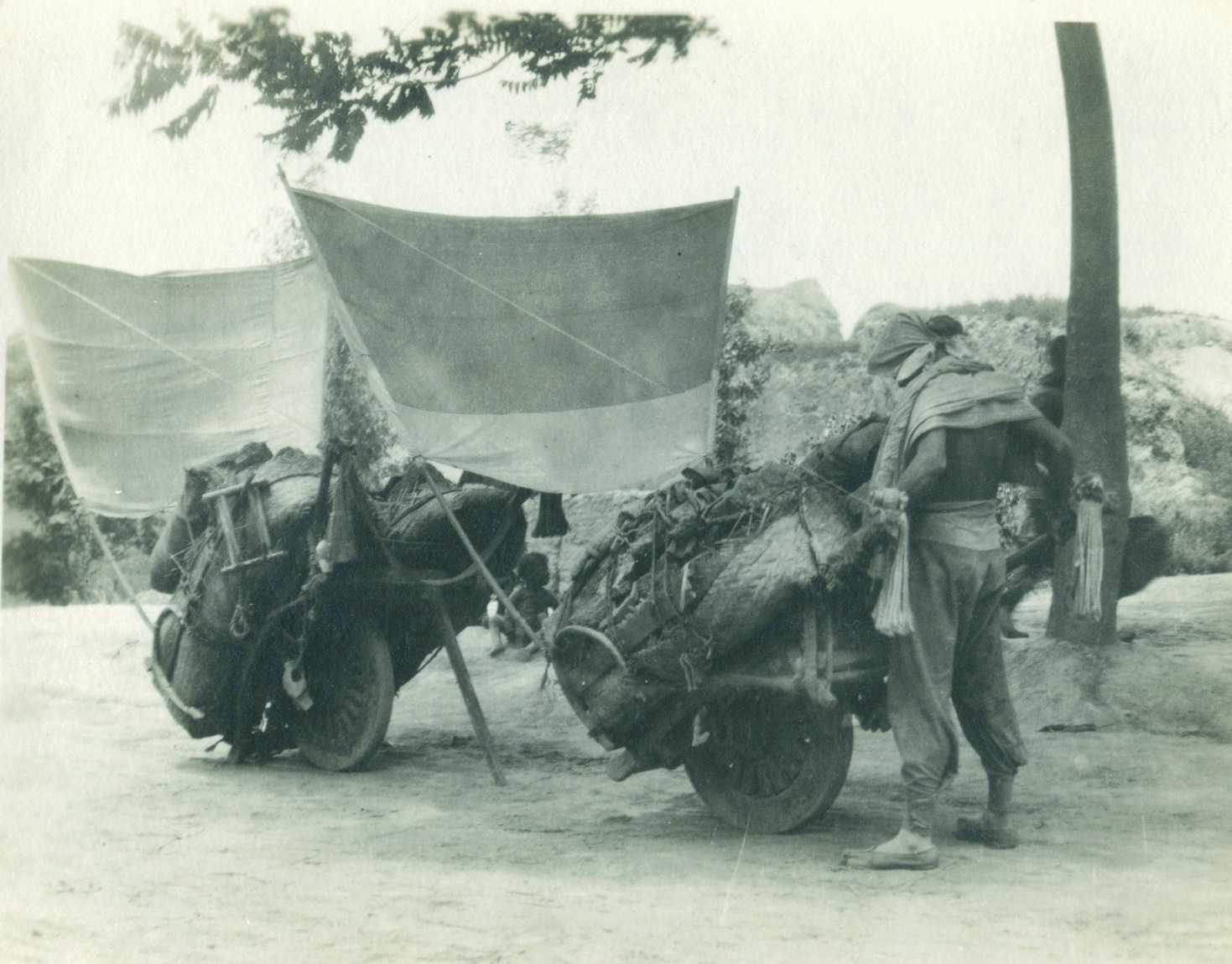
Wheelbarrows near Xi'an, c.1905 by Baptist missionary John Shields

Although there are records of Chinese sailing carriages from the 6th century these land sailing vehicles were not wheelbarrows, and the date of which the sail assisted wheelbarrow was invented is uncertain. Engravings are found in van Braam Houckgeest's 1797 book.

European interest in the Chinese sailing carriage is also seen in the writings of Andreas Everardus van Braam Houckgeest in 1797, who wrote:

Near the southern border of Shandong one finds a kind of wheelbarrow much larger than that which I have been describing, and drawn by a horse or a mule. But judge by my surprise when today I saw a whole fleet of wheelbarrows of the same size. I say, with deliberation, a fleet, for each of them had a sail, mounted on a small mast exactly fixed in a socket arranged at the forward end of the barrow. The sail, made of matting, or more often of cloth, is five or six feet (152 or 183 cm) high, and three or four feet (91 or 122 cm) broad, with stays, sheets, and halyards, just as on a Chinese ship. The sheets join the shafts of the wheelbarrow and can thus be manipulated by the man in charge.

=== Ancient Greece and Rome ===
M. J. T. Lewis surmised the wheelbarrow may have existed in ancient Greece in the form of a one-wheel cart. Two building material inventories for 408/407 and 407/406 B.C. from the temple of Eleusis list, among other machines and tools, "1 body for a one-wheeler (hyperteria monokyklou)", although there is no evidence to prove this hypothesis. (ὑπερτηρία μονοκύκλου in Greek):

Since dikyklos (δίκυκλος) and tetrakyklos (τετράκυκλος) mean nothing but "two-wheeler" and "four-wheeler," and since the monokyklos (μονόκυκλος) body is sandwiched in the Eleusis inventory between a four-wheeler body and its four wheels, to take it as anything but a one-wheeler strains credulity far beyond breaking point. It can only be a wheelbarrow, necessarily guided and balanced by a man...what does now emerge as certainty is that the wheelbarrow did not, as is universally claimed, make its European debut in the Middle Ages. It was there some sixteen centuries before.

M. J. T. Lewis admits that the current consensus among technology historians, including Bertrand Gille, Andrea Matthies, and Joseph Needham, is that the wheelbarrow was invented in China around 100 AD and spread to the rest of world. However, Lewis proposes that the wheelbarrow could have also existed in ancient Greece. Based on the Eleusis list, Lewis states that it is possible that wheelbarrows were used on Greek construction sites, but admits that evidence for the wheelbarrow in ancient farming and mining is absent. He surmised that wheelbarrows were not uncommon on Greek construction sites for carrying moderately light loads. He speculates the possibility of wheelbarrows in the Roman Empire and the later Eastern Roman, or Byzantine Empire, although Lewis concludes that the evidence is scarce, and that "most of this scenario, perforce, is pure speculation." The 4th century Historia Augusta reports emperor Elagabalus to have used a wheelbarrow (Latin: pabillus from pabo, one-wheeled vehicle) to transport women in his frivolous games at court. While the present evidence does not indicate any use of wheelbarrows into medieval times, the question of continuity in the Byzantine Empire is still open, due to a lack of research yet. Currently, there is no evidence for the wheelbarrow in ancient Greece and Rome.

=== Medieval Europe ===
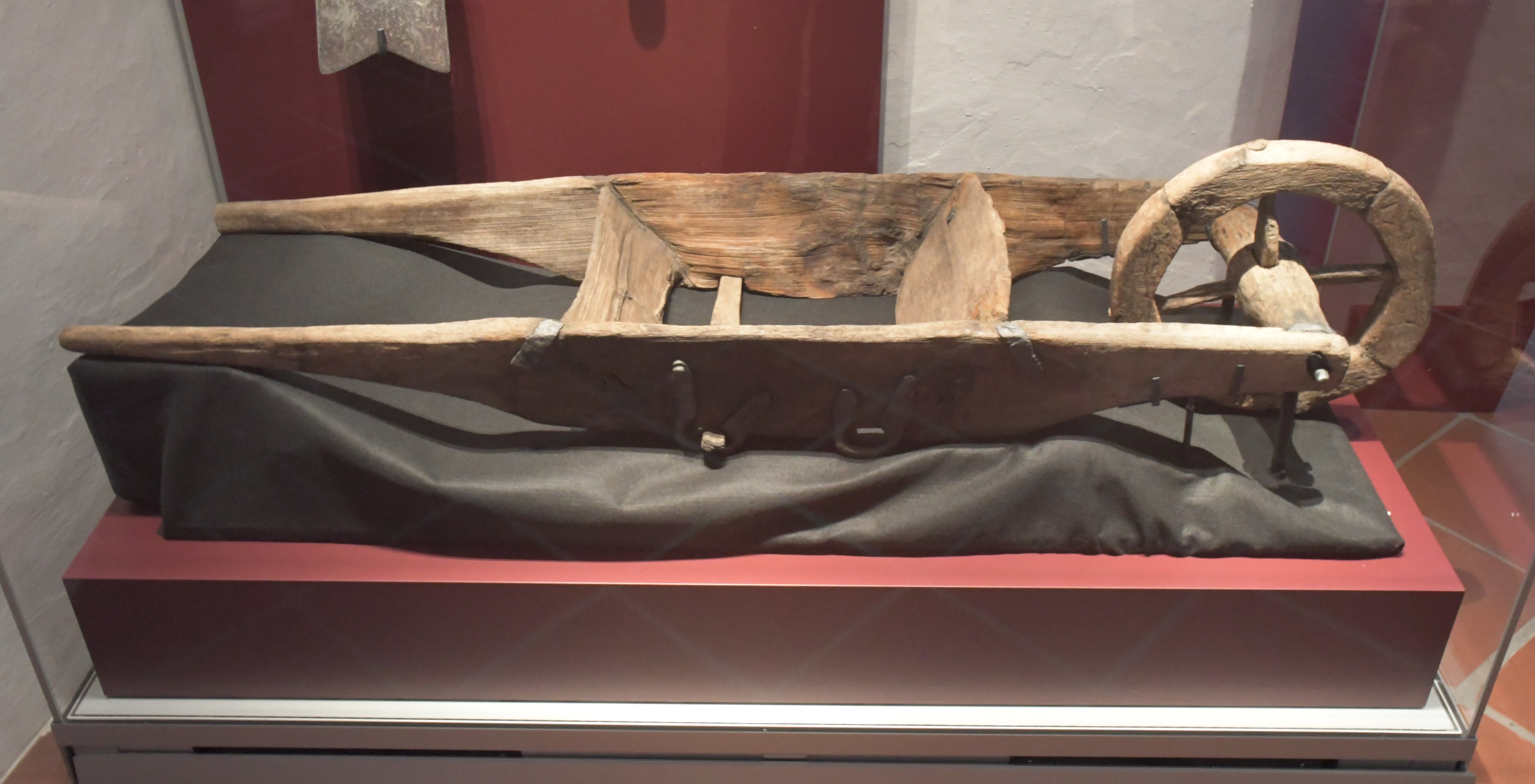
Europe's oldest surviving wheelbarrow, from Ingolstadt, ca. 1537

The first wheelbarrows in medieval Europe appeared sometime between 1170 and 1250. In contrast to the ones which typically have a wheel in the center of the barrow and were preferred in China, the types mostly used in Europe featured a wheel at or near the front, the arrangement of most wheelbarrows today.

Research on the early history of the wheelbarrow is made difficult by the marked absence of a common terminology. The historian of technology M.J.T. Lewis has identified in English and French sources four mentions of wheelbarrows between 1172 and 1222, three of them designated with a different term. According to the medieval art historian Andrea Matthies, the first archival reference to a wheelbarrow in medieval Europe is dated 1222, specifying the purchase of several wheelbarrows for the English king's works at Dover. The first depiction appears in an English manuscript, Matthew Paris's Vitae duorum Offarum, completed in 1250.

By the 13th century, the wheelbarrow proved useful in building construction, mining operations, and agriculture. However, going by surviving documents and illustrations the wheelbarrow remained a relative rarity until the 15th century. It also seemed to be limited to England, France, and the Low Countries.

The oldest wheelbarrows preserved from Central Europe were found in 2014 and 2017 during archaeological excavations in Ingolstadt, Germany. The felling dates of the trees that make up the wheelbarrow boards could be dendrochronologically dated to 1537 for one wheelbarrow and the 1530s for the other.

=== Modern wheelbarrows ===
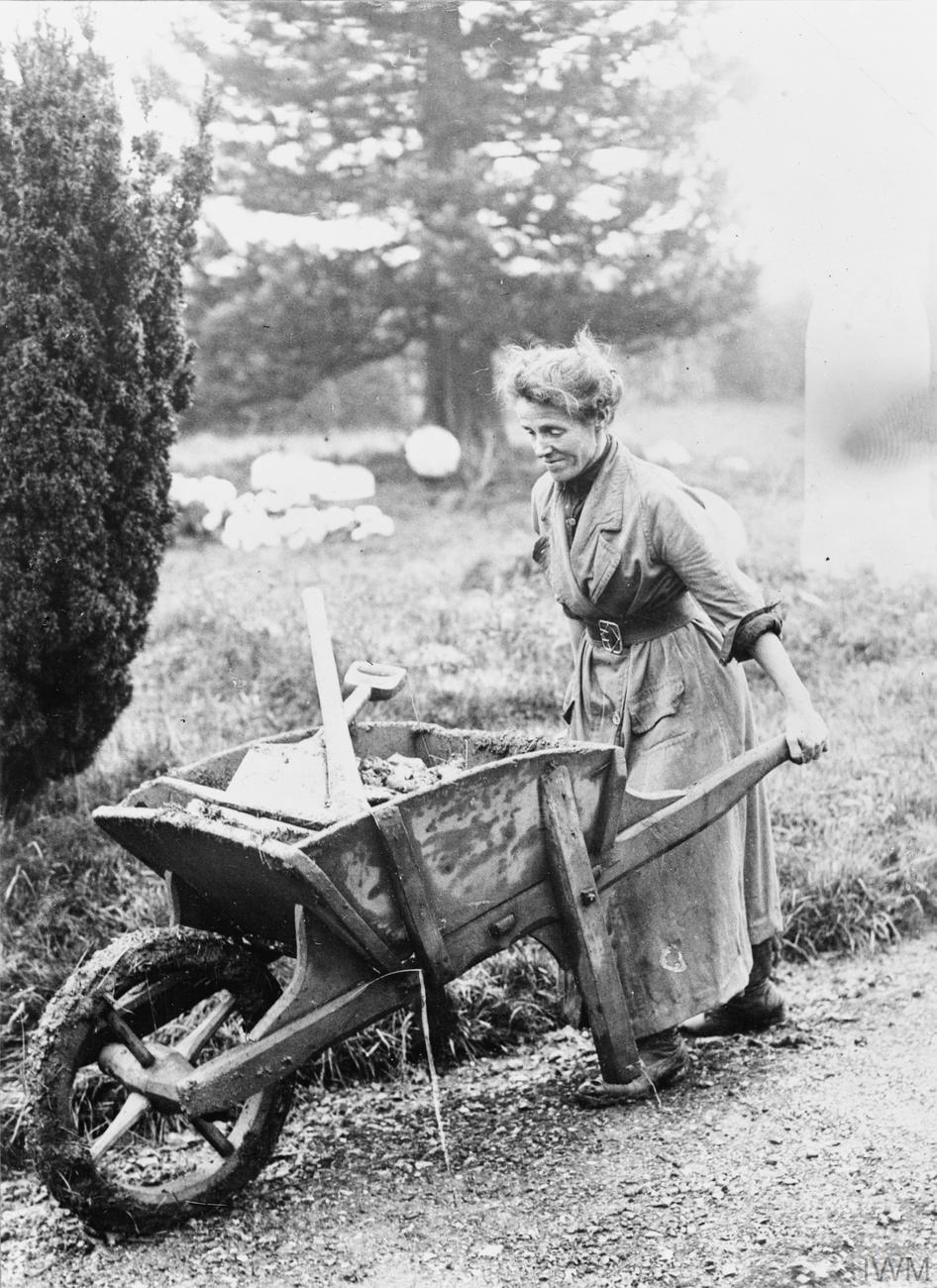
A gravedigger pushing a wheelbarrow, c. 1918

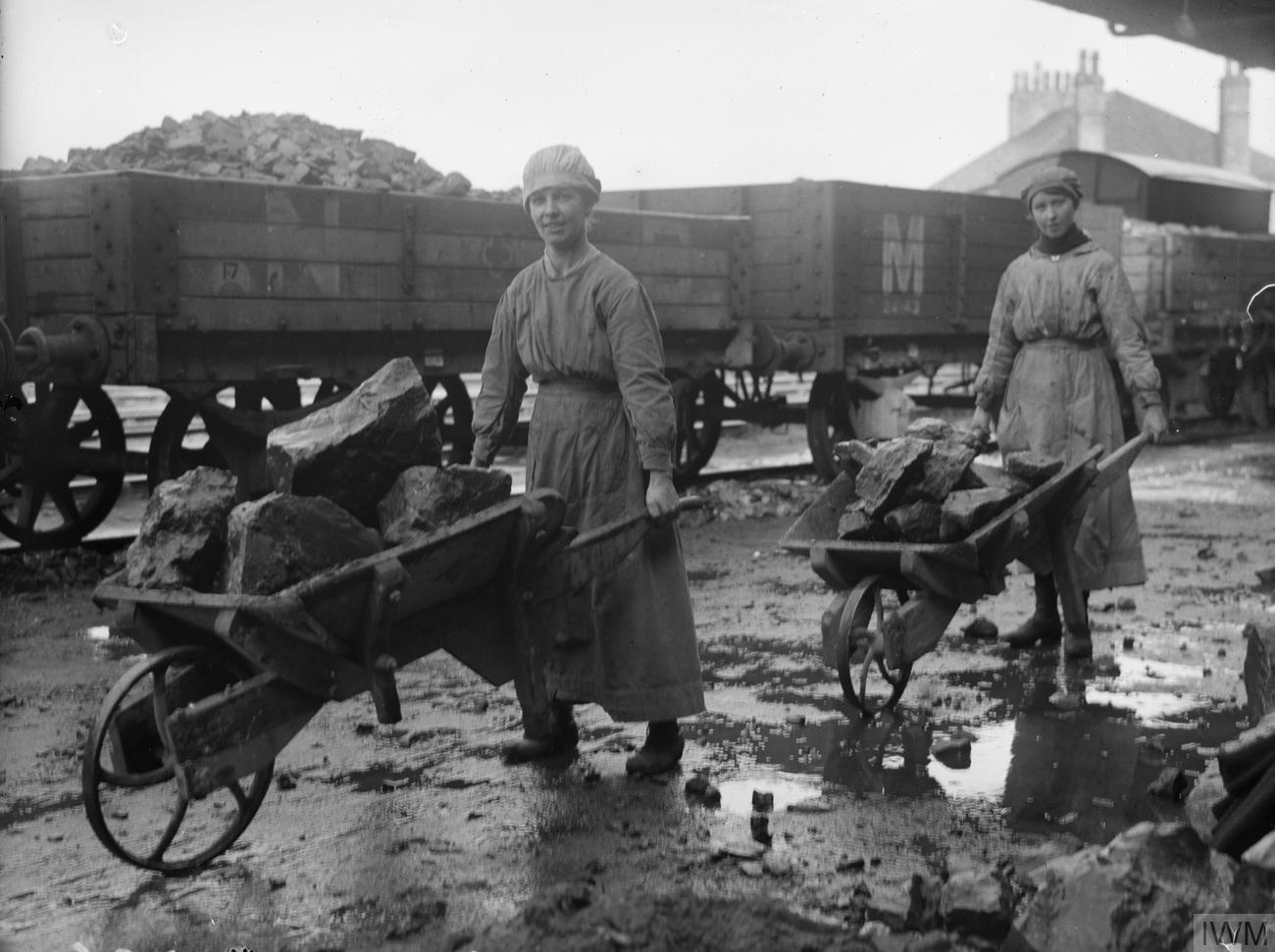
Workers transporting limestone blocks at a cement factory during World War I

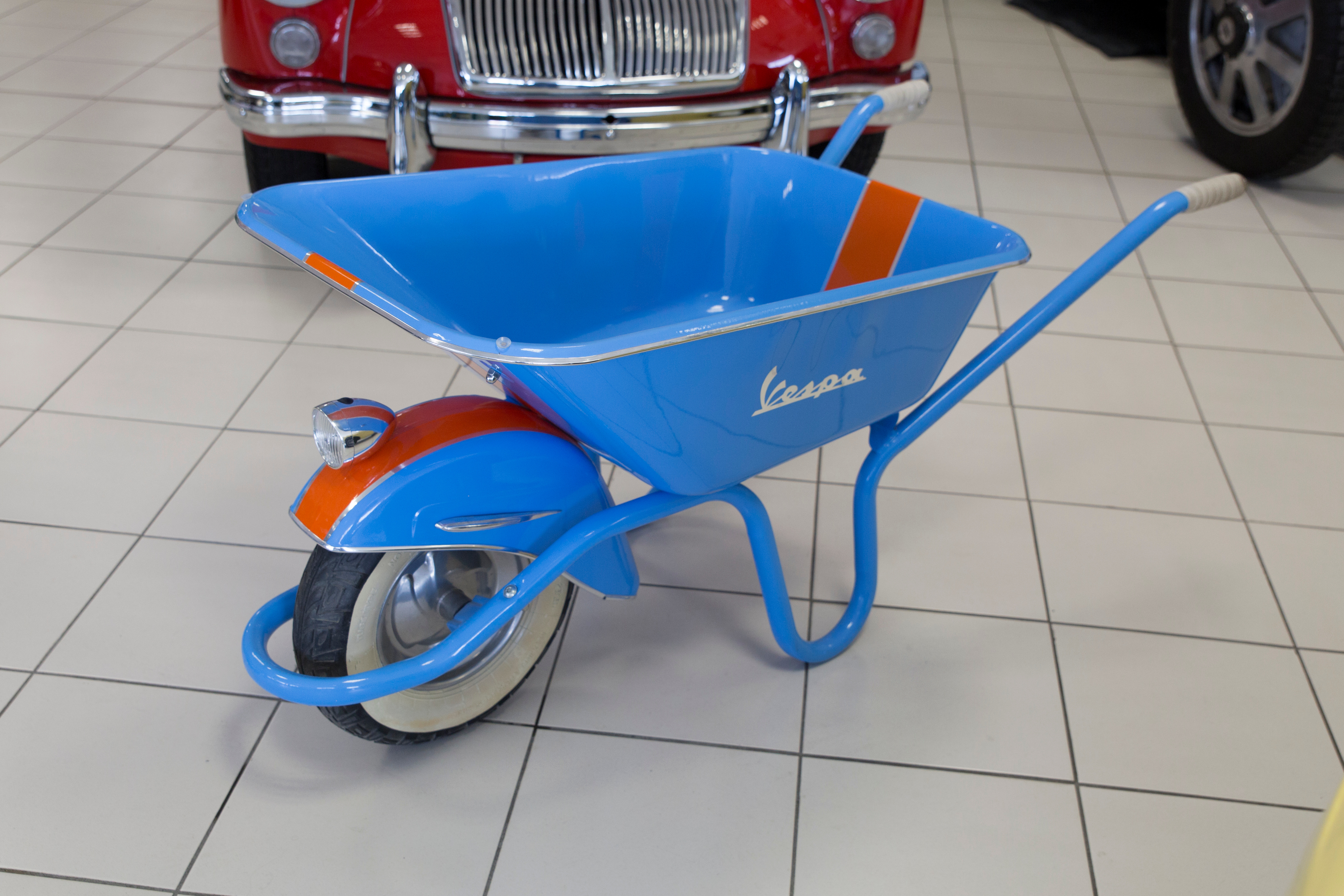
A novelty wheelbarrow designed to resemble a Vespa scooter

Modern day wheelbarrows are generally made from plastic or metal and generally come with either a pneumatic tire, semi-pneumatic tire, or solid tire. Modern wheelbarrows come in four standard shapes, the home gardener shallow-tray variety, the builder's barrow, the square tray utility barrow and the brick barrow.

Plastic wheelbarrows can be beneficial as they are light in weight reducing physical demand on the user. But plastic wheelbarrows are also suited to lighter loads.

Steel wheel barrows can handle heavier loads with carrying capacities of up to 110 L (4 cu ft) wet, or 160 L (6 cu ft) dry. Steel wheelbarrows more effectively transport heavy, jagged material without damaging the wheelbarrow and are often better suited to construction applications.

=== Modern variations ===
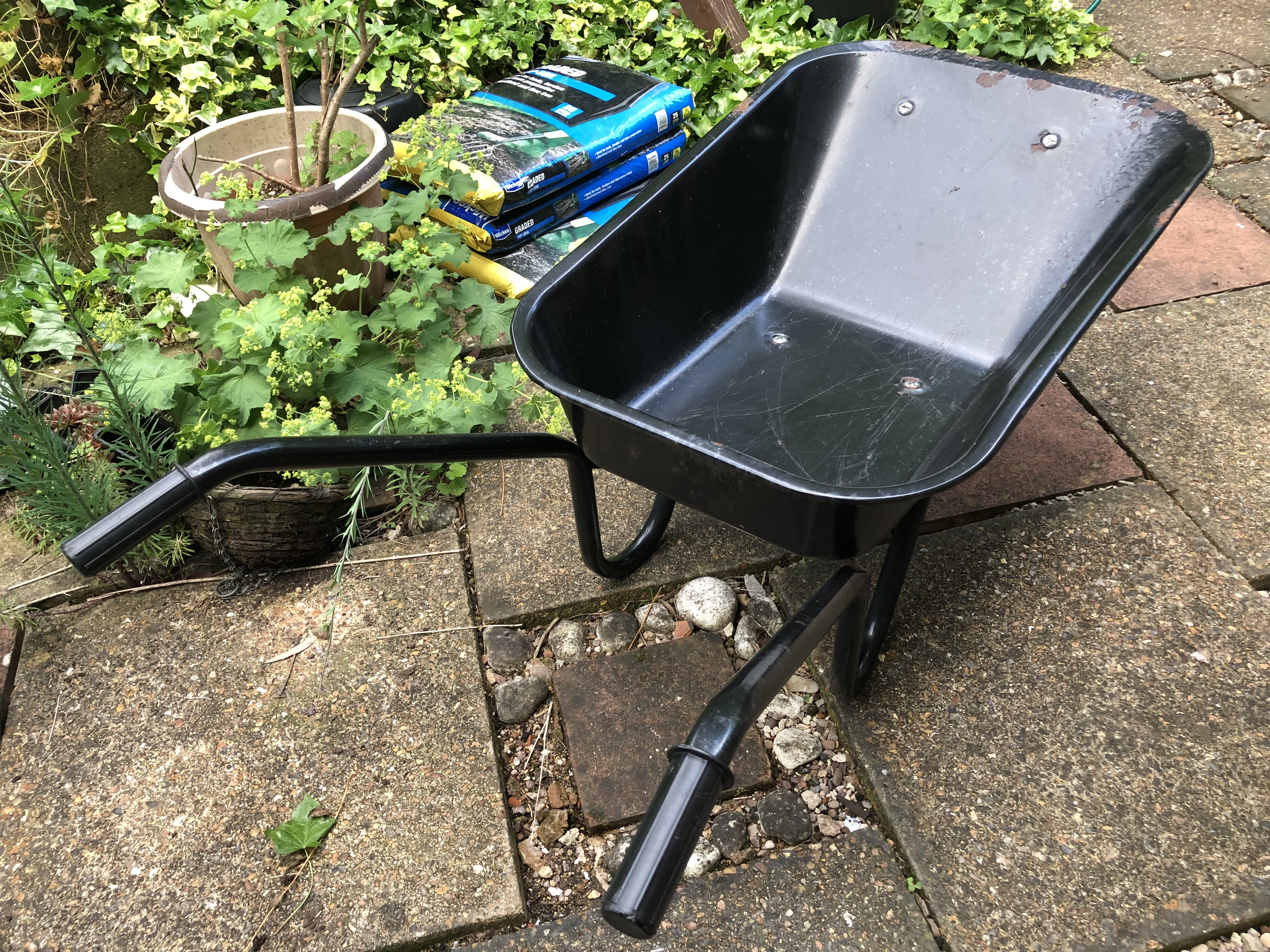
A black wheelbarrow

In the 1970s, British inventor James Dyson introduced the Ballbarrow, an injection-molded plastic wheelbarrow with a spherical ball on the front end instead of a wheel. Compared to a conventional design, the larger surface area of the ball made the wheelbarrow easier to use in soft soil, and more laterally stable with heavy loads on uneven ground.

Power-assisted wheelbarrows are now widely available from a number of different manufacturers. Powered wheelbarrows are used in a range of applications; the technology has improved to enable them to take much heavier loads, beyond weights that a human could transport alone without assistance. Motorized wheelbarrows are generally either diesel powered or electric battery powered. Often used in small-scale construction applications where access for larger plant machinery might be restricted.

== See also ==
- Cart
- Dolly
- Flatbed trolley
- Hand truck
- Handbarrow
- Wheelbarrow race
- Wheelbarrow Olympics
