= Hill of Aldie =

Hill in Aberdeenshire, Scotland

Coordinates: 57°27′51″N 1°54′24″W

The Hill of Aldie is an elevated landform in the east of Aberdeenshire, Scotland. Nearby is the prehistoric monument Catto Long Barrow.

== See also ==
- Laeca Burn
