= Bogbrae =

Hamlet in Aberdeenshire, Scotland

Coordinates: 57.4088°N 1.9478°W

Bogbrae is a hamlet in northeastern Aberdeenshire, Scotland. The location was mentioned in geographical literature as early as 1869, in reference to the infilling of a natural bog. There is considerable evidence of early human activity in the area around Bogbrae. Some of this is evident at Catto Long Barrow, a massive stone structure now surrounded by agricultural fields.

== See also ==
- Laeca Burn
