= Lonmay =

Coordinates: 57.6182°N 1.9779°W

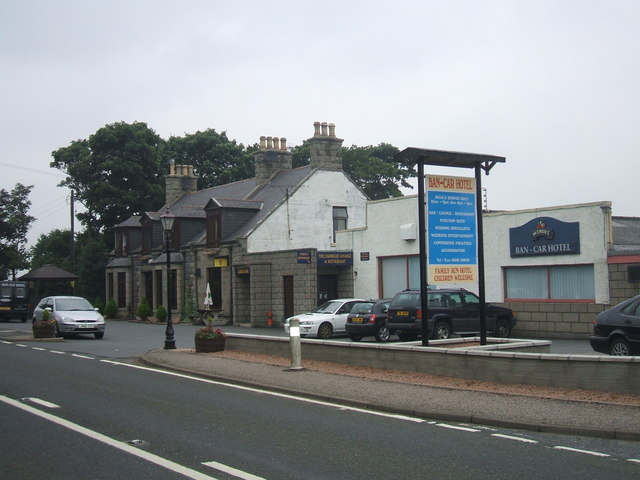

Lonmay (Scottish Gaelic: Lòn Magh) is a hamlet and parish in the Buchan area of Aberdeenshire, Scotland. It lies along the A90 road, between Peterhead and Fraserburgh, near to the junction with the A952 road at Cortes. The parish also encompasses the coastal village of St Combs. Lonmay had a station on the Formartine and Buchan Railway, but this closed in 1965. The present Lonmay Kirk dates from 1786.

Lonmay is largely agricultural and has several historic properties, notably Cairness House.

Lonmay is said to be the home of the ancestors of Elvis Presley.
