= List of listed buildings in Longside, Aberdeenshire =

This is a list of listed buildings in the parish of Longside in Aberdeenshire, Scotland.

== List ==
Name	Location	Date Listed	Grid Ref. (Note: Sometimes known as OSGB36, the grid reference (where provided) is based on the British national grid reference system used by the Ordnance Survey. • "Guide to National Grid". Ordnance Survey. • "Get-a-map". Ordnance Survey.)	Geo-coordinates	Notes	LB Number (Note: Historic Environment Scotland assign a unique alphanumeric identifier to each designated site in Scotland, for listed buildings this always begins with "LB", for example "LB12345".)	Image
50 South Street				57°31′19″N 2°00′01″W	Category C(S)	9430	Upload Photo
Bridge Of Rora				57°32′02″N 1°55′54″W	Category B	9422	Upload Photo
Glenugie Bridge Over South Ugie Water				57°31′15″N 1°57′19″W	Category C(S)	9424	Upload Photo
Inverquhomery Steading				57°30′31″N 1°58′00″W	Category B	9425	Upload Photo
Baluss Bridge Over South Ugie Water				57°30′46″N 1°59′54″W	Category B	9427	Upload Photo
Old Parish Church Of Longside				57°30′55″N 1°56′21″W	Category A	9410	Upload another image
Rowanlea, Main Street				57°31′05″N 1°56′32″W	Category B	9417	Upload Photo
Inverquhomery, Group Of 3 Dovecots				57°30′29″N 1°58′02″W	Category B	9426	Upload Photo
Dun-Na-Cluach (Former Manse Of Longside)				57°30′50″N 1°56′29″W	Category C(S)	9414	Upload Photo
Churchyard Of Longside Parish Church				57°30′56″N 1°56′21″W	Category C(S)	9413	Upload Photo
St. John's Episcopal Church, Longside				57°30′53″N 1°56′05″W	Category B	9419	Upload Photo
Millbank House				57°31′53″N 1°55′42″W	Category B	9421	Upload Photo
Mill Of Rora House				57°32′15″N 1°55′55″W	Category B	9423	Upload Photo
42, 44, 46 And 48 South Street				57°31′19″N 2°00′01″W	Category C(S)	9429	Upload Photo
Duncan, Street Of Rora				57°32′44″N 1°53′53″W	Category B	9431	Upload Photo
Bruce Arms Hotel, Main Street And Inn Brae				57°31′01″N 1°56′22″W	Category C(S)	9415	Upload Photo
Viewfield, Inverquhomery Rd				57°30′55″N 1°56′26″W	Category C(S)	9418	Upload Photo
Cairngall House And Garden Walls				57°30′59″N 1°55′54″W	Category C(S)	9420	Upload Photo
Parish Church Of Longside				57°30′56″N 1°56′21″W	Category B	9411	Upload Photo
Churchyard Gateway, Longside Parish Church				57°30′56″N 1°56′21″W	Category A	9412	Upload another image
Marshlands, Main Street				57°31′03″N 1°56′24″W	Category B	9416	Upload Photo
Lambhillock, South Street				57°31′25″N 2°00′01″W	Category C(S)	9428	Upload Photo

== Key ==
The scheme for classifying buildings in Scotland is:

- Category A: "buildings of national or international importance, either architectural or historic; or fine, little-altered examples of some particular period, style or building type."
- Category B: "buildings of regional or more than local importance; or major examples of some particular period, style or building type, which may have been altered."
- Category C: "buildings of local importance; lesser examples of any period, style, or building type, as originally constructed or moderately altered; and simple traditional buildings which group well with other listed buildings."

In March 2016 there were 47,288 listed buildings in Scotland. Of these, 8% were Category A, and 50% were Category B, with the remaining 42% being Category C.

== See also ==
- List of listed buildings in Aberdeenshire
