= A952 road =

Road in Scotland

Coordinates: 57.4891°N 1.99893°W

A952

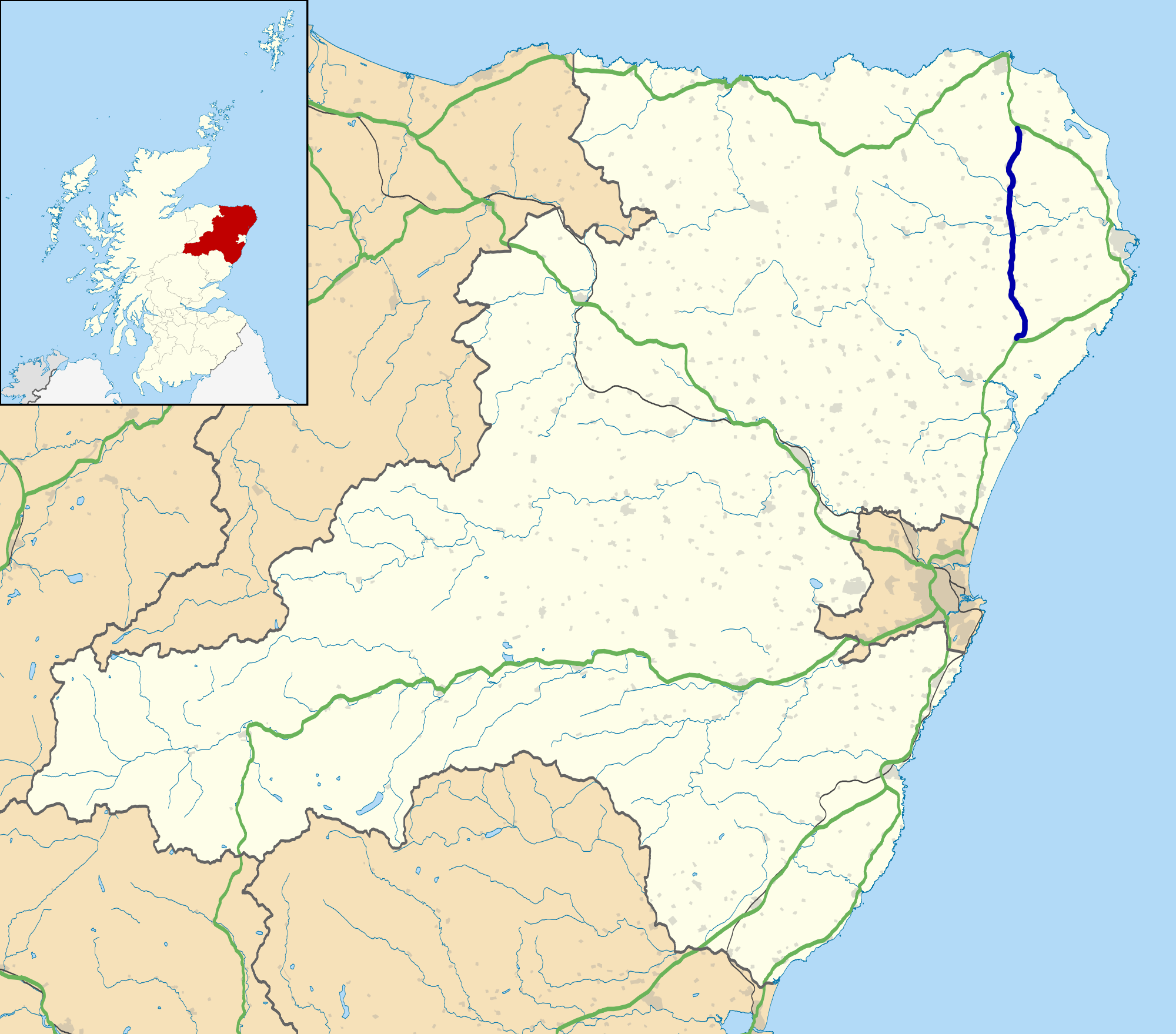

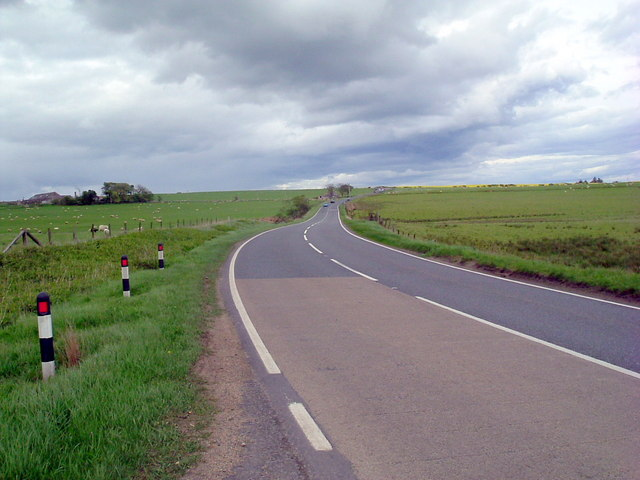
- A952 road northbound near Toll of Birness

Route information
- Length: 16.5 mi (26.6 km)

Major junctions
- From: A90 at Toll of Birness
- A90 A950; A90
- To: A90 at Cortes

Location
- Country: United Kingdom
- Constituent country: Scotland

Road network
- Roads in the United Kingdom; Motorways; A and B road zones

The A952 road is a main road in Aberdeenshire, Scotland. This roadway is a north–south connector that serves as an inland bypass to the more coastally aligned A90 road. It runs from Toll of Birness in the south to Cortes in the north, passing through the communities of Ardallie, Clola, Mintlaw and New Leeds. It has been noted that traffic accidents are most frequent at pronounced road bends along the A952.

== History ==
The local area is rich with prehistorical and historical features. Somewhat to the east of the A952 road are a number of prehistoric monuments including Catto Long Barrow, Silver Cairn and many tumuli. In that same vicinity of the Laeca Burn watershed is the point d'appui of historic battles between invading Danes and indigenous Picts.
