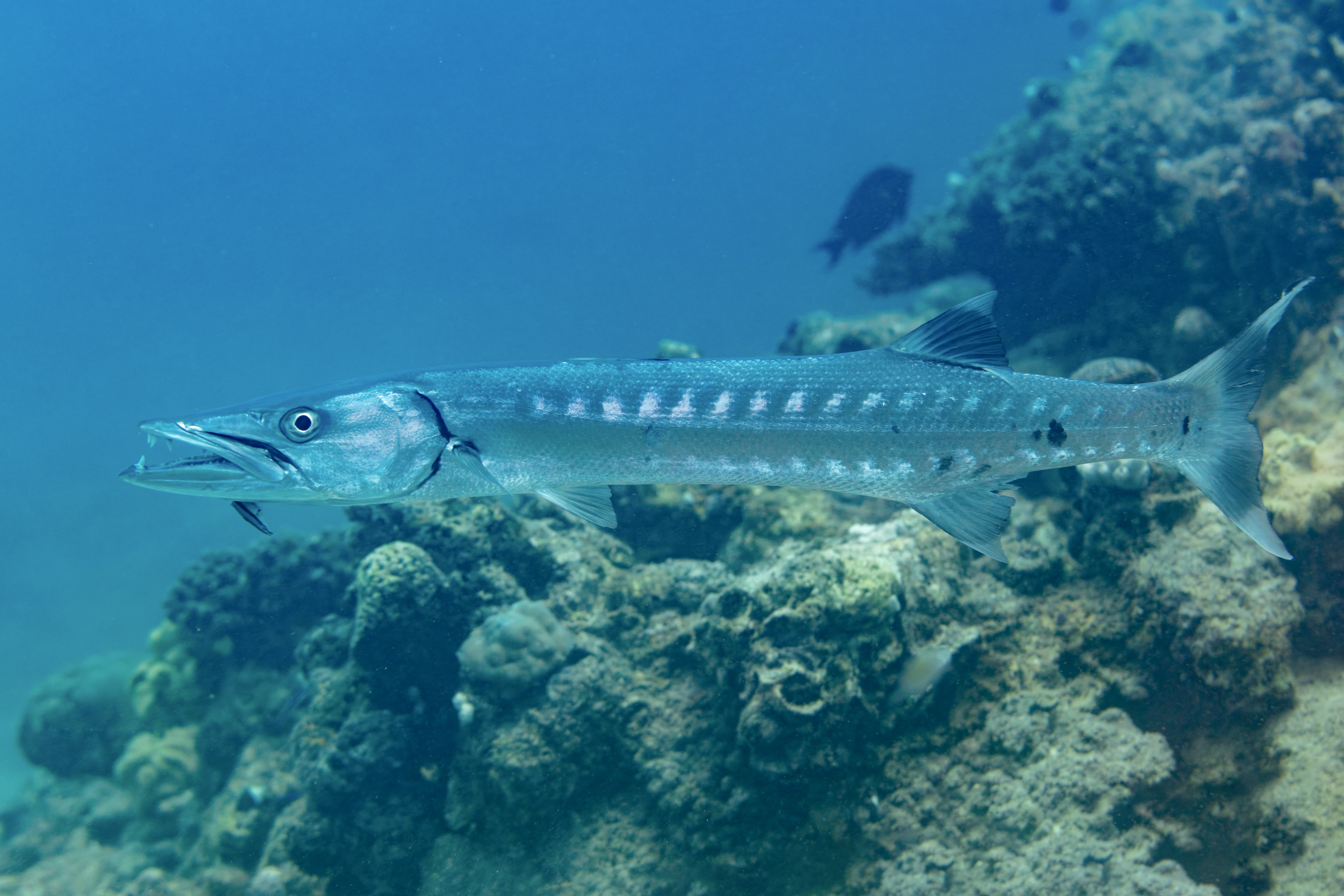
- In the Red Sea

Conservation status
- Least Concern (IUCN 3.1)

Scientific classification
- Kingdom: Animalia
- Phylum: Chordata
- Class: Actinopterygii
- Division: Teleostei
- Order: Carangiformes
- Suborder: Centropomoidei
- Family: Sphyraenidae
- Genus: Sphyraena
- Species: S. barracuda

Binomial name
- Sphyraena barracuda (Edwards in Catesby, 1771)

Synonyms
- List: Sphyraena barracuda Walbaum, 1792; Agrioposphyraena barracuda (Walbaum, 1792); Esox barracuda Walbaum, 1792; Esox barracuda Edwards, 1771; Sphyraena becuna Lacépède, 1803; Sphyraena commersonii Cuvier, 1829; Sphyraena dussumieri Valenciennes, 1831; Sphyraena picuda Bloch & Schneider, 1801; Sphyraena sphyraena picuda Bloch & Schneider, 1801

= Great barracuda =

Great barracuda Temporal range: Miocene–Present

Species of fish

Sphyraena barracuda, commonly known as the great barracuda, is a species of barracuda, a genus of 27 species of large ray-finned fish found in subtropical oceans worldwide.

== Distribution and habitat ==
The great barracuda is present in tropical to warm temperate waters, in subtropical parts of the Indian, Pacific, and Atlantic oceans. Primarily found in oceans near the equator, the great barracuda finds refuge in mangroves to deep reefs, and seagrass beds, up to depths of 110 m (360 ft). Juveniles and small adults typically inhabit locations near the shore, such as mangroves and seagrass meadows, while adults are typically found further away from shore around artificial structures, reefs, and rock outcroppings. These fish use these structures as a form of refuge. Studies conducted by a research group that tagged and monitored these fish in the Bahamas concluded that a significant proportion of the population stayed in their residential habitats for a long period of time; however, a small portion of the population have traveled outwards, suggesting they are capable of large-scale migration.

== Description ==
Showing both dorsal fins, in Brazil

Great barracudas are elongated fish with powerful jaws. The lower jaw of their large mouth juts out beyond their upper one. Barracudas possess strong, fang-like teeth that are unequal in size, set in sockets in the jaws and on the roof of the mouth. Their head is quite large, pointed and pike-like in appearance.

In the Caribbean

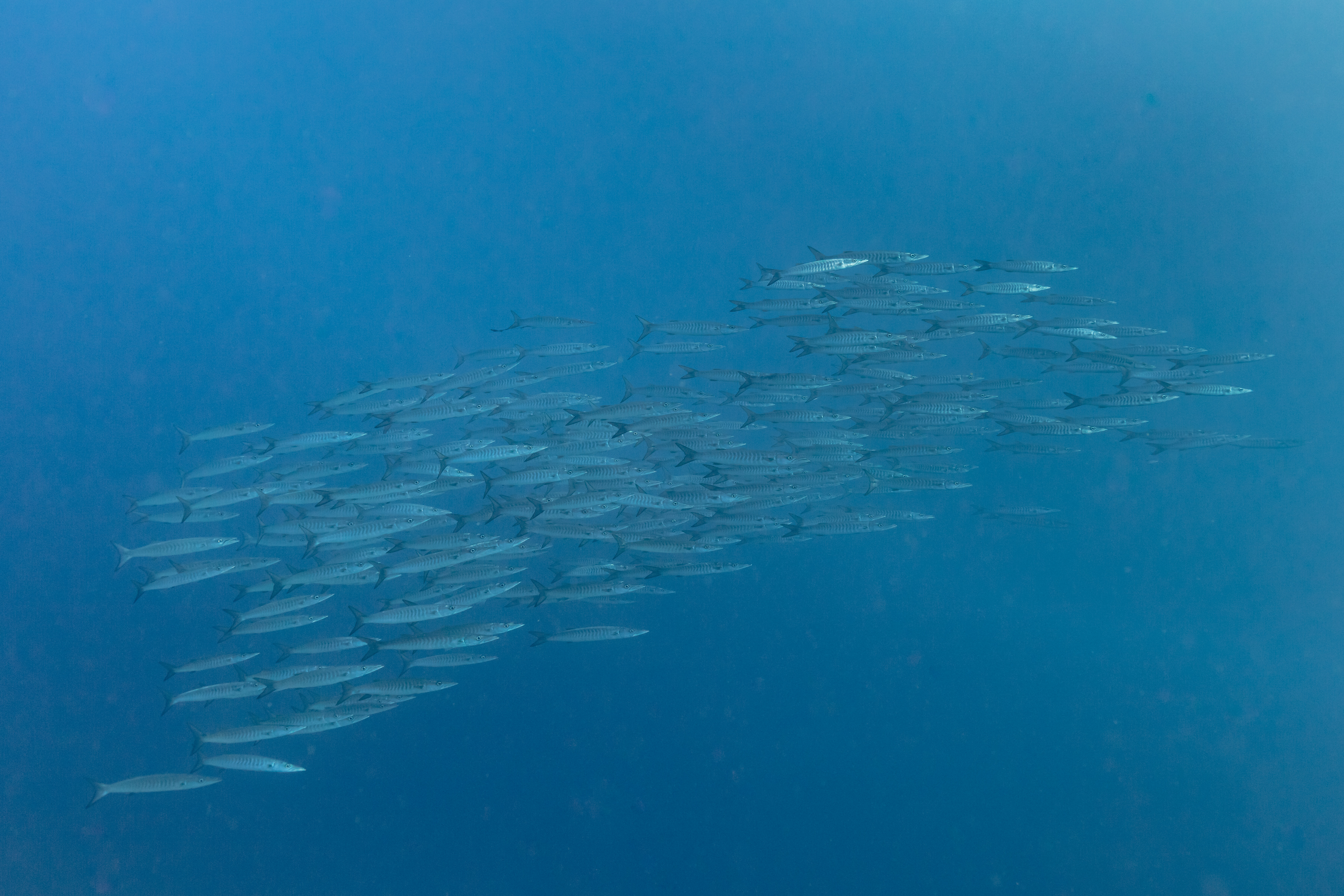
School of great barracudas in the Red Sea

The great barracuda is blue gray above, fading to silvery and chalky-white below. Sometimes, a row of darker stripes occurs on its upper side, with black blotches on each lower side. The second dorsal fin, as well as the anal and caudal fins, range from dark violet to black with white tips.

Great barracudas are also large fish, and the largest of its genus. Mature specimens are usually around 60–100 cm (24–39 in) in length and weigh 2.5–9.0 kg (5.5–19.8 lb). Exceptionally large specimens can exceed 1.5 m (4.9 ft) and weigh over 23 kg (51 lb). A record-sized specimen caught on rod-and-reel weighed 46.72 kg (103.0 lb) and measured 1.7 m (5.6 ft), while an even longer specimen measured 2 m (6.6 ft). The largest great barracuda was said to have measured 3 m (9.8 ft).

== Behavior and biology ==
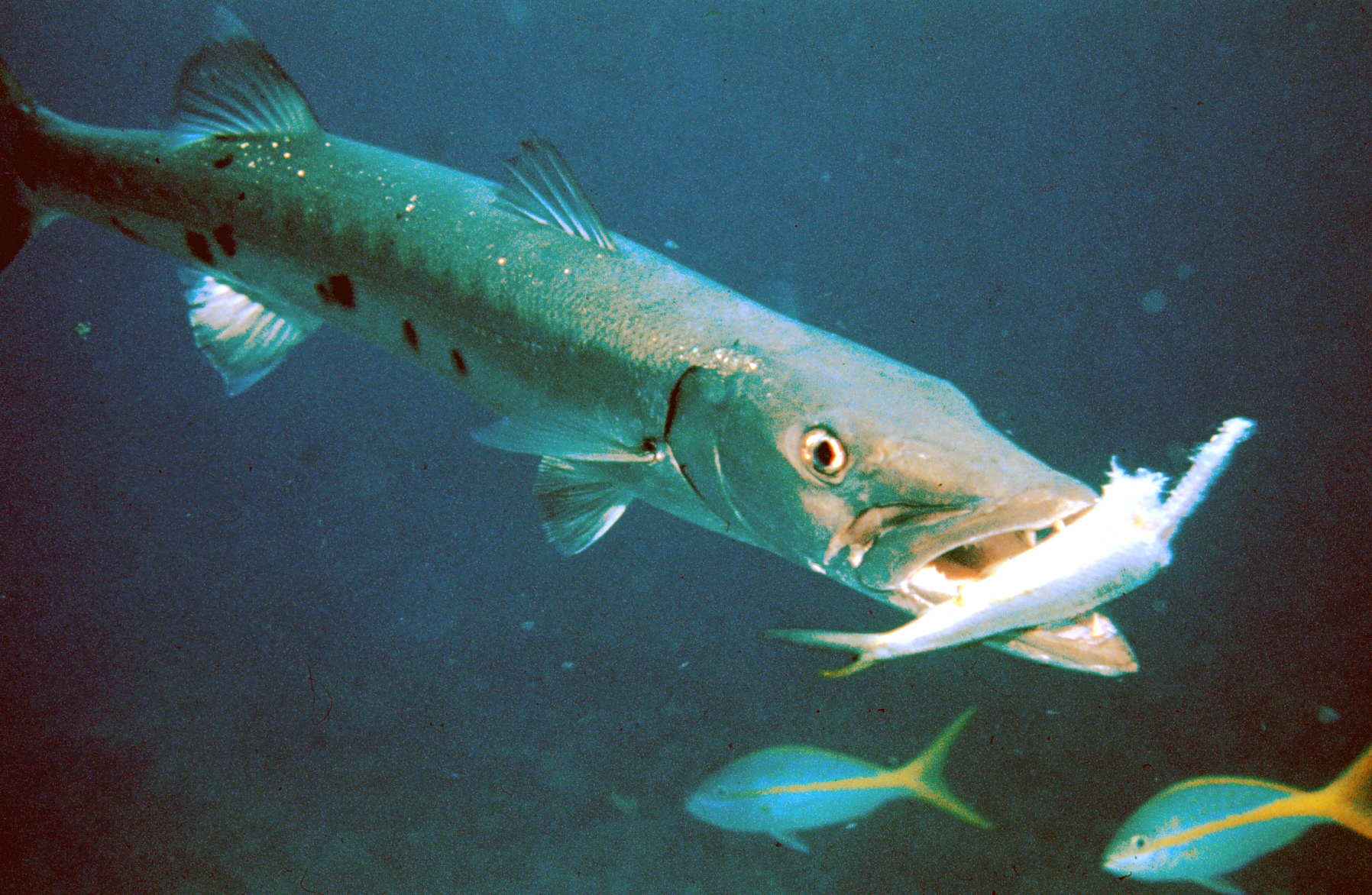
Great barracuda with prey

Barracudas live in open seas. They are voracious predators and hunt by ambush. They rely on surprise and short bursts of speed up to 36 mph (58 km/h) to overrun their prey, sacrificing maneuverability. The Barracuda's dorsal and anal fin are located in the posterior segment of its body. This is an evolutionary trait that allows the fish to move quickly and have an ambush attack style. The gill covers do not have spines and are covered with small scales. The two dorsal fins are widely separated, with the first having five spines and the second having one spine and nine soft rays. The second dorsal fin equals the anal fin in size and is situated more or less above it. The lateral line is prominent and extends straight from head to tail. The spinous dorsal fin is situated above the pelvis. The hind end of the caudal fin is forked or concave, and it is set at the end of a stout peduncle. The pectoral fins are low down on the sides. The barracuda has a large swim bladder.

Barracudas are more or less solitary. Young and half-grown fish frequently congregate in schools. The great barracuda captures small prey through the ram-capturing method. This is done by opening their mouth and engulfing the prey with just one bite. While with bigger prey, the ram capture method is still used. But requires multiple bites and lateral shaking of the head to reduce the prey to smaller pieces and move towards the anterior portion of the mouth to be eaten.

Hanging vertically while attended by bluestreak cleaner wrasse, in the Red Sea

Barracudas can reach at least 14 years of age. The spawning season lasts from April to October. Females can release about 5,000 to 30,000 eggs. The highest spawn rate occurs in July, August, and September, then drops off in the months after (especially in winter). Studies conducted on S. barracuda in Florida have found that females reach sexual maturity as early as 1–2 years of age and males at 3–4 years of age, concluding that females reach maturity about 1 year earlier than males.

The diets of these top predators are composed almost totally of fish (such as killifishes, herrings, sardines, gobies, silversides, anchovies, small mullets, and lizardfish), cephalopods, and occasionally shrimp. Large barracudas, when gorged, may attempt to herd a school of prey fish in shallow water, where they guard over them until they are ready for another hunt.

== Relationship with humans ==
Barracudas are scavengers, and may mistake snorkelers for large predators, following them in hopes of eating the remains of their prey. Swimmers have been reported being bitten by barracuda, but such incidents are rare and possibly caused by poor visibility. Barracudas may mistake objects that glint and shine for prey.

Barracuda attacks on humans are rare, although bites can result in lacerations and the loss of some tissue. They are a popular target for recreational fishing, due to the strong fight they put up when hooked. However, they are also known for the pungent odor they release upon being caught, and their meat has a chance of causing Ciguatera fish poisoning when eaten.

== Conservation status ==
Great barracudas are reportedly declining in Florida, and the Florida Fish and Wildlife Conservation Commission is considering imposing catch limits. Studies have proven that fishing-related stressors can reduce the barracuda's physical capability of evading to a refuge for protection. Having impaired cognitive or visual acuity limits their ability to locate their refuge areas, increasing their chances of being preyed upon. There have been some instances of sightings and catches of great barracudas outside their normal subtropical and tropical habitats, such as the Canadian oceans and the North-East Atlantic. One can assume this can be caused by factors like global warming habitat destruction and other factors that could affect these fish to swim offshore toward new deeper waters seeking new refuge or prey.
