= Skelmuir Hill =

Hill in Aberdeenshire, Scotland

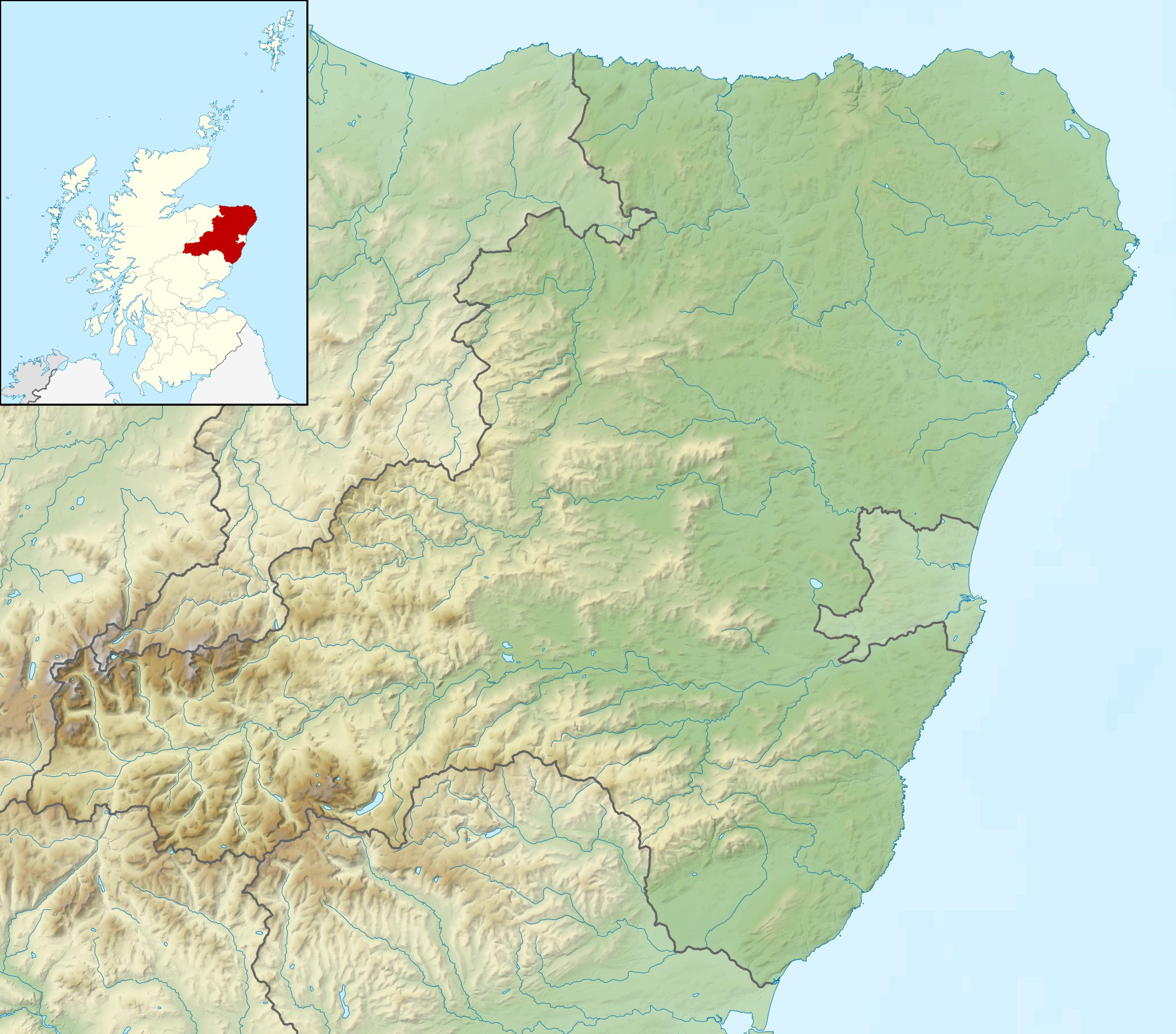
- Location within Aberdeenshire

Highest point
- Coordinates: 57.4633°N 2.0247°W

Geography
- Location: Aberdeenshire, Scotland

Skelmuir Hill is a hill in Aberdeenshire, Scotland. It is the location of a trig point, an official government survey marker. Skelmuir Hill is the site of two prehistoric standing stones and lies in the vicinity of another ancient monument, Catto Long Barrow.

== See also ==
- Laeca Burn – Stream in northeastern Aberdeenshire, Scotland
