= Point d'appui =

Type of location in military theory

A point d'appui (French for fulcrum), in military theory, is a location where troops are assembled prior to a battle. Often a monument is erected to commemorate the point d'appui for notable battles. In some battles there may be more than a single point d'appui.

== Examples ==
An example is the Catto Long Barrow in eastern Aberdeenshire, Scotland, which is located at the point d'appui of a historic battle between Vikings and Picts.

== See also ==
- Maneuver
- Schwerpunkt, a term with a similar literal meaning though not a similar military meaning
- Staging area
