= RNAS Longside =

RNAS Longside RNAS Lenabo RAF Longside
- Longside, Aberdeenshire Scotland in United kingdom of Great Britain

Site information
- Type: Royal Air Force station
- Owner: Air Department 1915–1918; Air Ministry 1918–1920
- Operator: Royal Naval Air Service; Royal Air Force
- Open to the public: Yes, as a woodland

Location
- Shown within Aberdeenshire RNAS Longside (the United Kingdom)
- Coordinates: 57.474°N 1.950°W

Site history
- Built: 1915
- In use: 1916 - 1920
- Battles/wars: First World War

RNAS Longside is a former Royal Naval Air Service airship station located 3.2 miles (5.1 km) south of Longside, Aberdeenshire and 3.7 miles (6.0 km) north of Hatton, Aberdeenshire, Scotland. It was constructed in 1915 and was operational from 1916 until 1920 when the extensive buildings were demolished. It is sometimes referred to as RNAS Lenabo particularly by locals who termed the airships 'Lenobo Soo' a reference to the name of the area combined with the local dialect for a pig. It was the most northerly air ship station in mainland Britain. The air ships also used a small mooring site near Montrose in bad weather. The remit was to patrol the shipping lanes in the North Sea and the north east coast.

Since the airship station was decommissioned, it has been used as a forestry plantation and there is little indication of its former use.

== History ==
The land at Lenabo was a large piece of bog land and when it was decided to commission it to be used as the most northerly British air base station before any building could start, the land had to be cleared. The meaning of Lenabo is taken from the Gaelic 'Lannam bo' that means 'wet meadow of the cows' and was an apt description of the land. The excavations were carried out by thousands of Irish and Scottish labourers drafted into the area. A large amount of peat was removed from the 950 acre site using basic equipment such as steam scoops and bucket cranes.

The buildings on the site were extensive and included three airship sheds that were 100 ft (30 m) high and could be seen on the horizon for miles as the land was flat. There were also two 66 ft (20 m) high chimneys as well as stores, workshops and administration areas together with barracks. Unlike most sites constructed for use during the war, which were of an easily removed nature, the buildings at the base were built to last and were heavy concrete and brickwork. The main entrance had two concrete pillars adorned with elaborate globes mounted at the top.

Four airships could be accommodated in the biggest shed while one or two could be housed in the smaller hangars.

There were 1,500 personnel based at the station and the facilities included a swimming pool, shops, a theatre and a church. There was also a gas works within the site.

The arrival by rail of two deflated airships in 1916 signified the base becoming operational. There was an extensive community stationed at the base and it is referred to in the book "Longside: a parish and its people" as a township. A magazine titled "The Battlebag" was regularly produced and distributed at the base.

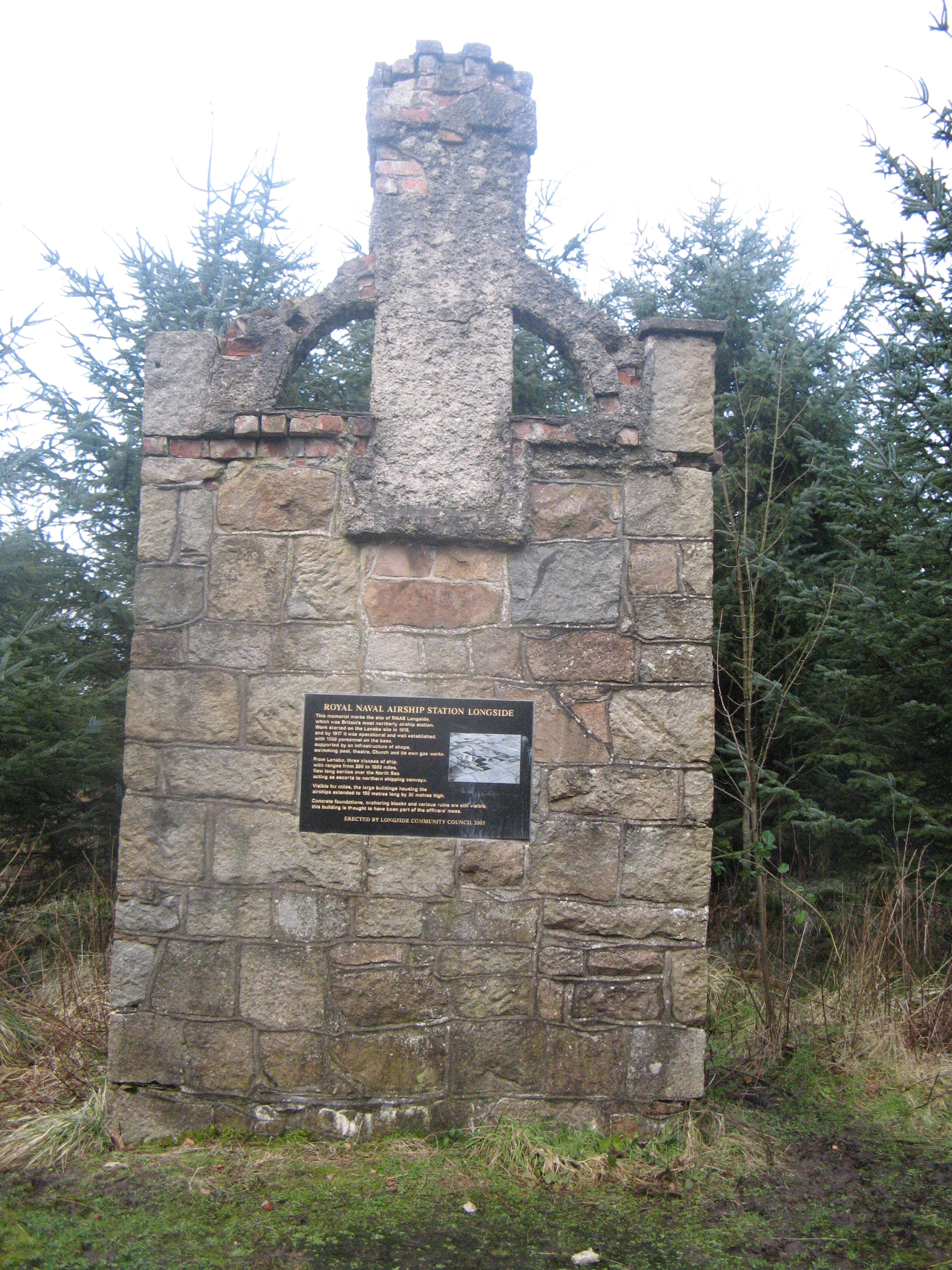
Part of building which still remains in early 2013

There was a railway line operated by the Great North of Scotland Railway, which ran from Longside to the base. The spur was solely used to service the air station and was operational from late 1916; 31,913 tons of coal were brought in on the railway branch line. A local landowner was paid £2,500 to compensate for the use of the part of his land the railway line ran through although the land was returned to him when the base was closed. In 1920 the first fatal car accident in Buchan occurred when a train on the rail line to the base hit a car.

The three large airship hangars at the base had massive doors ranging from 80 ft (24 m) high with a width of 113 ft (34 m) through to 105 ft (32 m) by 150 ft (46 m) and these doors were on rollers to ease opening and closing them. According to Hughes, the common Royal Air Force term 'Two six heave' was first coined by personnel trying to open the doors.

== Operations ==
The commander was Lieutenant Commander Robinson and his second in command was Squadron Commander Moyes.

The site was used by the NS class blimps N.S.3, 4, 6, 11 and 12.

In June 1918 an airship was damaged over the Firth of Forth and five crew members were lost. The following month another airship and crew was lost in the North Sea. A wooden propeller was eventually found and is kept in St John's Church, Longside as a memorial to the lost crew.

There were strong gales at the end of September 1918 causing difficulties landing the airships returning to the base. The extreme conditions resulted in four of the airships having to be 'ripped' once they had been maneuvered into the shelter of the hangars. Ripped is the term used when the rip cord attached to the control car is deliberately pulled to deflate panels sited on the airships. The airships ripped included a C10A and a SSZ65.

During the coal strike of 1919, airmen from the base used their trucks to carry mail. As the war drew to a close, there were 12 airships at the base. Locals called the airships "Lenobo Soo". 'Soo' is the local derivative for a sow or pig. The base was very quickly closed by the Air Ministry in 1920 and it was purchased by demolition companies for a nominal amount. The majority of the buildings were eventually demolished.

== Ancillary site ==
A smaller site at Auldbar, near Montrose was utilised to moor the airships if they were unable to return to the main base station in bad weather. Situated 70 miles (110 km) south of Lenabo, it was the only mooring station in Scotland. Four bases for the airships were cleared in the forested area and used as 'nests'. The trees gave protection from the wind so, in comparison to the main base, only a skeleton staff was required. Little remains of the sub-station site except some traces of the mooring pit.

== Current use ==
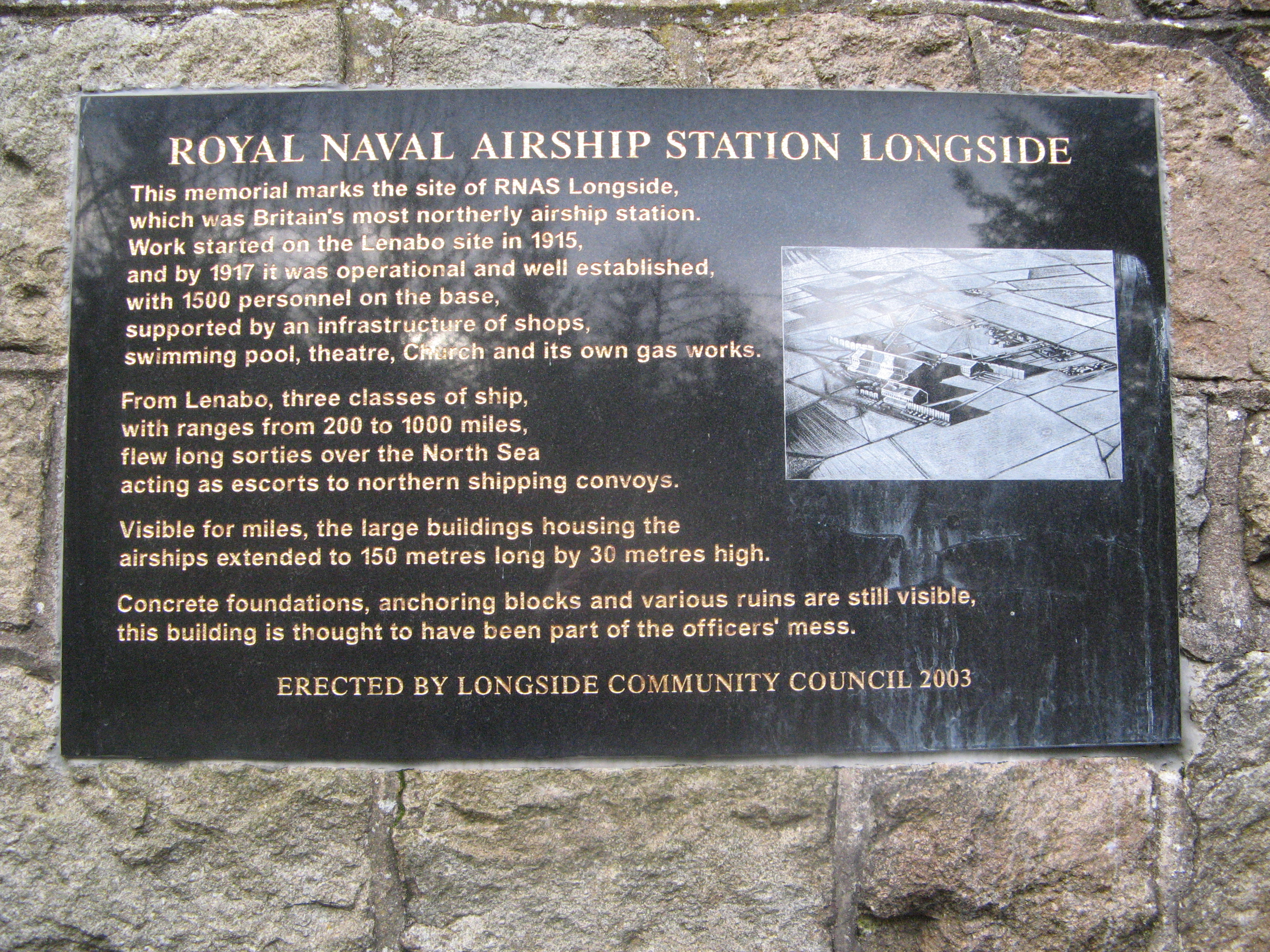
Memorial plaque

After the site was closed in 1920, the site was forested during the 1920s and when the trees were felled in the 1960s and 1970s it was discovered that some of the buildings still remained. The chimneys and entrance pillars were demolished in 1966 as the structures were thought to be unsafe.

As of early 2013, the site is currently woodland. It is difficult to find the original layout of the airfield from remains but there are still some concrete floors, mooring blocks and other massive bits of concrete within the trees.

In 2003, Longside Community Council had a memorial plaque mounted on to a structure that is thought to have been part of the officer's mess. The structure is just beside the small parking area at the entrance to the forest. The plaque incorporates a photo of the base, which is held at the RAF Museum.

== See also ==
- List of former Royal Air Force stations

== Bibliography ==
- Hughes, Jim (March–April 1997). "'Forgotten' Airship Base: Royal Naval Airship Station Longside". Air Enthusiast. No. 68. pp. 52–55. ISSN 0143-5450.
- May & Hay, Vi & Sandy, Gordon (2000). Longside: A parish and its People. Peterhead: Longside Parish Church. ISBN 09539586-0-4.
- Hughes, Jim (2003). Airfield Focus, RNAS Longside (Lenabo). Peterborough: GMS Enterprises. ISBN 1-904514-09-X.
