= Cortes, Aberdeenshire =

Coordinates: 57.623°N 1.991°W

Cortes: Scottish Gaelic: Cuairt Dheas
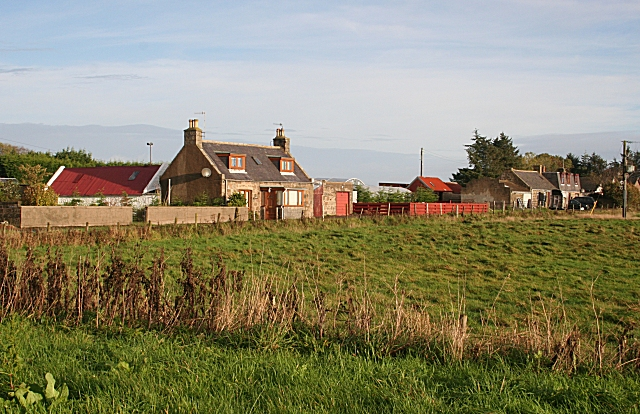
- Cortiebrae Cottages, Cortes

- Location within Aberdeenshire
- OS grid reference: NK006592
- Council area: Aberdeenshire
- Lieutenancy area: Aberdeenshire
- Country: Scotland
- Sovereign state: United Kingdom
- Post town: FRASERBURGH
- Postcode district: AB43
- Dialling code: 01346 (Lonmay)
- Police: Scotland
- Fire: Scottish
- Ambulance: Scottish
- UK Parliament: Aberdeenshire North and Moray East
- Scottish Parliament: Banffshire and Buchan Coast

Cortes is a rural settlement in the Banff and Buchan area of Aberdeenshire, Scotland, situated in the parish of Rathen, 7.8 kilometres (4.8 mi) south of Fraserburgh.

The area stretches from the grounds of Cortes House in the west to Cortes Village in the east on the border with the adjacent parish of Lonmay.

== Schools ==
Primary education is provided at Rathen School, whilst secondary pupils travel to Fraserburgh Academy.

== Transport ==
Cortes lies at the northern end of the A952 road at its junction with the A90 road.

Regular bus services connect the area to Fraserburgh, Peterhead and Aberdeen, and an on-demand Dial-a-bus service is also available.

The nearby Lonmay railway station closed in 1979, and now offers an access point to the Formartine and Buchan Way, the long-distance path that follows the route of the former railway.

== Landmarks ==
To the south lies Mormond Hill, on the slopes of which a hill figure known as the White Stag of Mormond, marked with quartz stones, was first laid out by Mr F. W. Cordiner of Cortes to mark his wedding in 1870.

== History ==
The name Cortes is said to derive from a Gaelic word meaning circle, in reference to a structure that was described as a Druid temple in the New Statistical Account of Scotland (1845), but is now believed to be the remains of a recumbent stone circle.

Another stone circle, of which only three stones remain, is situated on farmland at Cortie Brae.

Cortes House is a granite-built Regency mansion, built in 1810.
