= Morris Wells =

Natural springs in Scotland

Coordinates: 57.4694°N 1.8780°W

Morris Wells are a series of natural springs in eastern Aberdeenshire, Scotland. This water source has historically been a water supply for the town of Peterhead.

== See also ==
- Laeca Burn
- Catto Long Barrow
