= Handbarrow =

Type of human-powered transport

The handbarrow, also spelled hand-barrow and hand barrow, is a type of human-powered transport. It was originally a flat, rectangular frame used to carry loads such as salt cod, cheese and guano. It has handles on both ends, so two people are needed to use it. In Dutch cheese markets, official porters (kaasdragers) still use traditional barrows, albeit with straps, to transport cheese. A special handbarrow was built to move the Stone of Destiny around Westminster Abbey. Modern usage has expanded the definition to include the wheelbarrow or any wheeled cart or box propelled by hand.

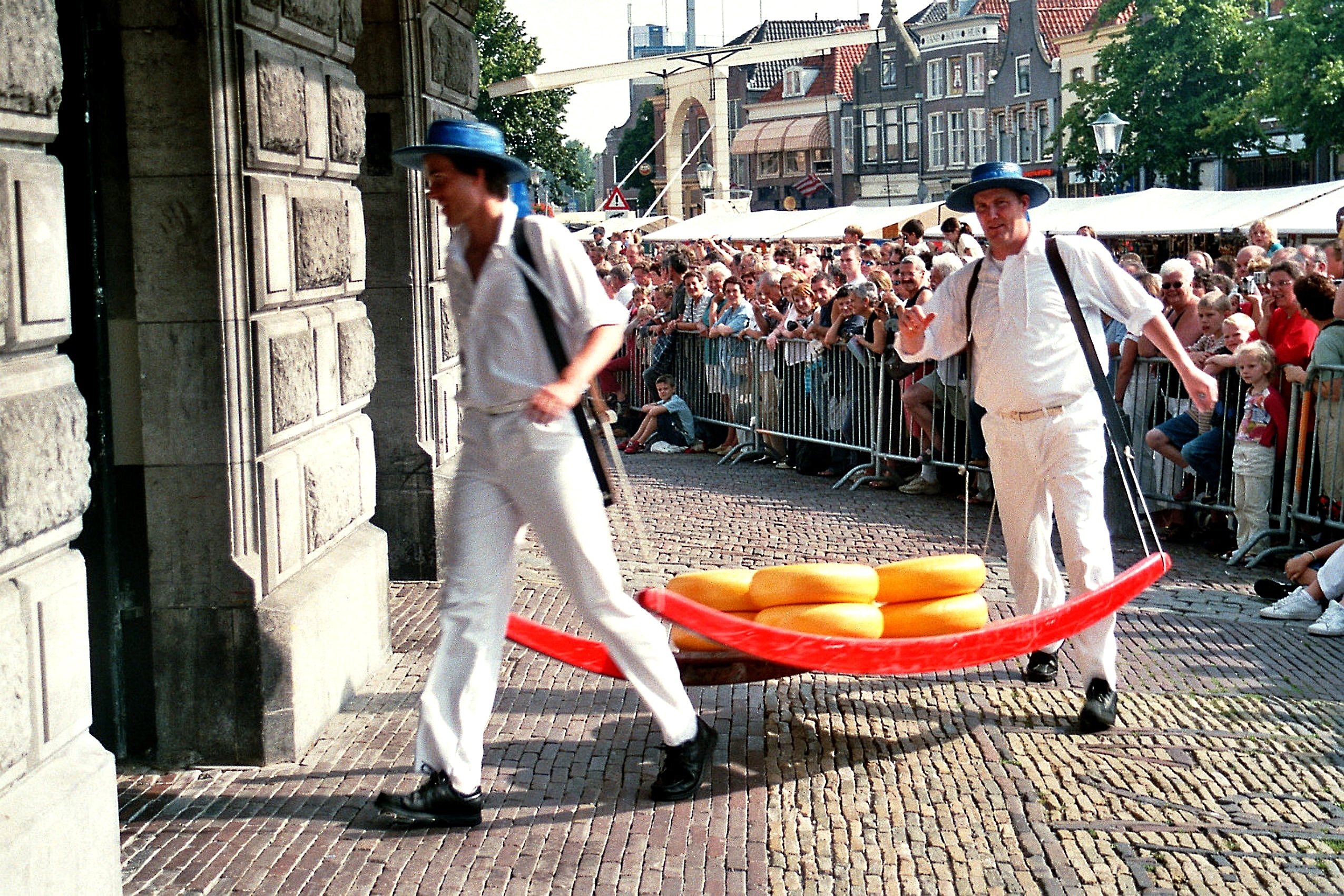
Traditional Dutch barrow for hauling and weighing cheese, used with shoulder straps

Scholars such as Lynn Townsend White Jr., Albert Leighton and Andrea Matthies suggest it may have inspired the invention of the wheelbarrow. The addition of a wheel meant it only required one person. (Leonardo da Vinci is sometimes credited as the inventor, but a crude form of the wheelbarrow was in use in England in the early 14th century, predating da Vinci by a century.)

The Middle English word barwe means handbarrow, litter or stretcher, the last two being similar in construction to the handbarrow, only with the "cargo" being a person.
