= Maneuverability =

== See also ==
- Maneuver (disambiguation)
- Supermaneuverability
