= Longside =

Coordinates: 57.5167°N 1.933°W

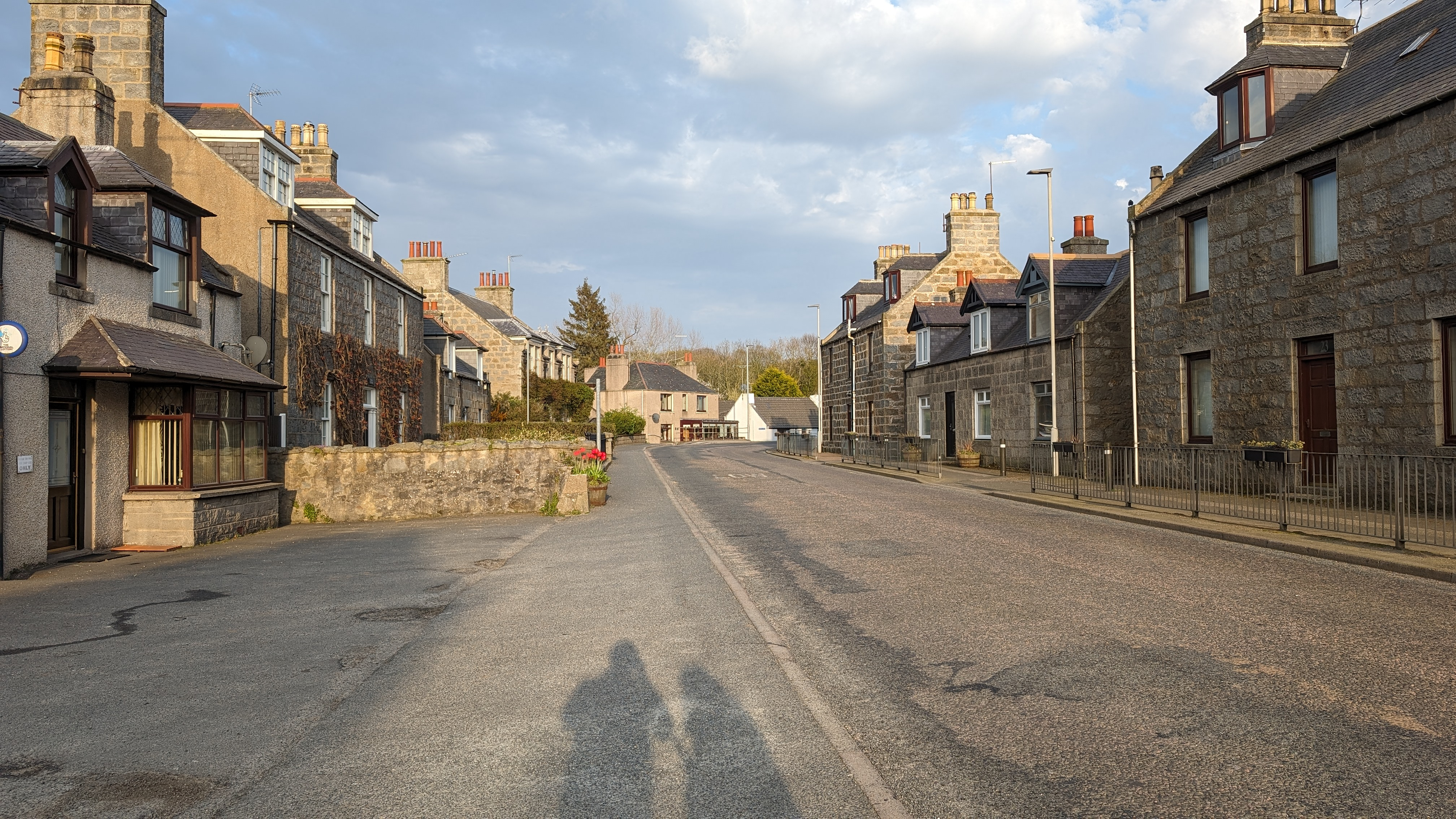
- Longside's Main Street (the A950), looking east

- Location within Aberdeenshire
- Population: 1,030 (2020)
- OS grid reference: NK036474
- Council area: Aberdeenshire
- Lieutenancy area: Aberdeenshire
- Country: Scotland
- Sovereign state: United Kingdom
- Post town: PETERHEAD
- Postcode district: AB42
- Dialling code: 01779
- Police: Scotland
- Fire: Scottish
- Ambulance: Scottish
- UK Parliament: Aberdeenshire North and Moray East
- Scottish Parliament: Aberdeenshire East
- Website: aberdeenshire.gov.uk

Longside is a town located in Aberdeenshire, Scotland, consisting of a single main street. It lies seven miles inland from Peterhead and two miles from Mintlaw on the A950. Its population in 2001 was 721. The River Ugie flows through it.

It lies in the centre of what was the ancient parish of Longside, which was established in 1641 and covered an extensive area. There are a number of listed buildings in the village. During the First World War, the most northerly Royal Navy air station was based within the parish and there was also an active airfield used during World War II on a different site close to the village.

Amenities include a local Parish Church, a primary school, and a junior football club, Longside F.C. There is also a golf club, Longside Golf Club, which was opened in 1979 and its course was extended to 18 holes in 1996. There are also local shops; businesses; a community hall; and tennis courts.

== History ==
There is considerable evidence of prehistoric activity in the nearby area, most notably in the form of the Catto Long Barrow and numerous tumuli.

The records of the Parliament of Scotland shows an act was passed in November 1641 to allow the erection of a kirk at Longside. A church had previously been sited in Longside dating back to 1620.

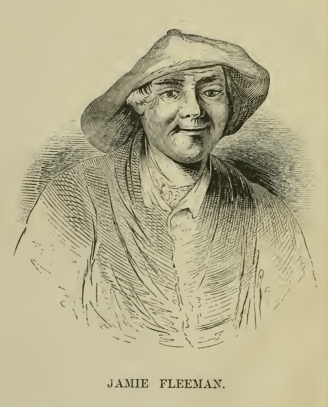
Jamie Fleeman, the Laird of Udny's Fool

Almost a century later following the Penal Act 1746 (19 Geo. 2. c. 38), the Episcopal Church at Longside was burnt down by the Hanoverians. Rev John Skinner of Longside spent six months in prison after evading a strict Penal Act 1748 (21 Geo. 2. c. 34) which decreed that Episcopalian ministers could only preach to his own family. Skinner had tried to circumvent the act by preaching from his cottage window to a congregation outside. Skinner is buried in the parish churchyard and his grave is marked by a monument.

The grave of Jamie Fleeman (1713–1778) who was better known as 'the Laird of Udny's Fool' is also at Longside and a monument to mark his grave was erected in 1861. He was born in Longside and died at nearby Kinmundy. His notoriety in the area is best exampled by his mention in the New Statistical Account of Scotland 1845, where under Section II, eminent characters, it states:

"No offence is meant by introducing here the name of an individual who had a county (if not a national) reputation, and whose printed memorabilia have gone through several editions. This was Jamie Fleeman (or Fleeming), "the Laird of Udny's fool," who flourished here about the middle of last century. His name appears frequently in the session's list of paupers and his sayings and doings have been a theme of wonderment to a generation or two."

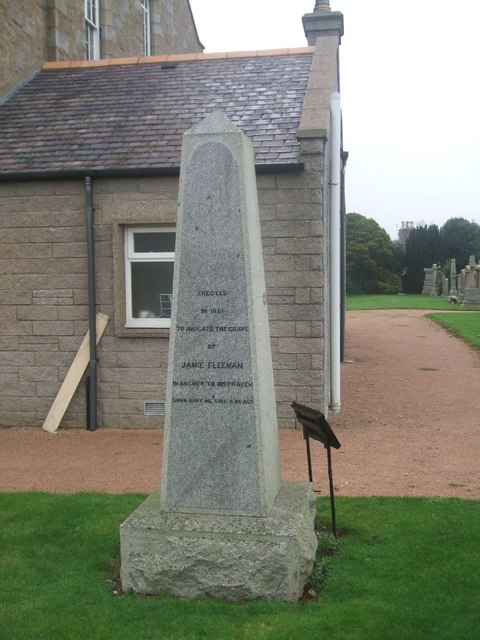
Jamie Fleeman's grave, Longside

The village was extended by the Laird of Pitfour, James Ferguson (the Member) in around 1801 as part of the planned village’s development in the area.

The village population in 1831 was recorded as 316. It steadily increased to 447 in 1861 with a further increase to 584 ten years later in 1871. By 1881, the population had dropped back to 474.

In 1882, there were two schools recorded at Longside. The first was just given as Longside and it had accommodation for 135 with an average attendance figure of 107. This attracted a government grant of £93 2s. There is also a listing for Longside girls' school. The figures quoted for this are accommodation 120; average attendance 96 and the grant was £84.

Longside railway station was part of the rail link between Mintlaw and Peterhead which was opened to both freight and passengers on 3 July 1862. It was a station on the Formartine and Buchan Railway until the service was terminated as part of the Beeching cuts of the 1960s. The platform can still be seen situated adjacent to the golf course.

=== Cairngall ===
Slightly to the east of the village and close to the railway was the Cairngall estate. This had a mansion and extensive granite quarries. The quarries were first worked around 1808. It is known the land there was originally little more than a waste moorland but sometime prior to 1841 it was reclaimed and became highly productive. In 1808, the foundations for Bell Rock Lighthouse were supplied from Cairngall. The new London Bridge, the pier walls of the new Houses of Parliament, pillars in Covent Garden Market and the pillars of St George's Hall in Liverpool were just some of the other well-known structures with granite from the Cairngall quarries used in their construction. In the Statistical Account for Scotland 1791–99 granite from Cairngall is described as "very beautiful" but it also goes on to state "its hardness renders it unfit for any except the plainer orders of architecture". Cairngall House and its garden walls were first built with two floors and two windows in the 18th century. In the 19th century the house was extended and the windows changed. Both the house and the garden walls are included on Historic Environment Scotland's category C statutory listing.

=== Airfields ===
Longside Airfield
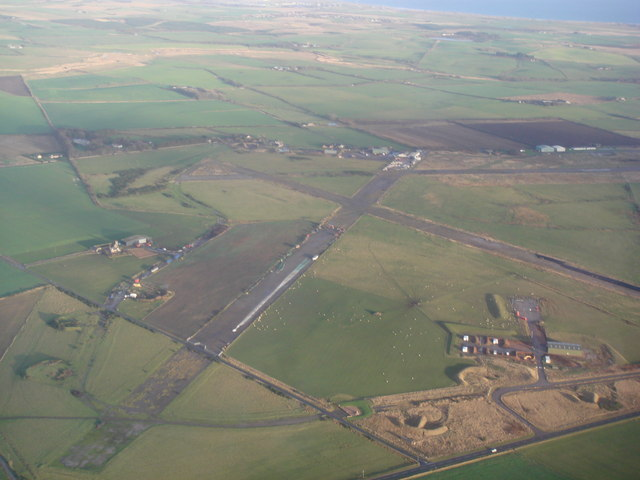
- The airfield in 2006, looking north
- IATA: none; ICAO: AG5458

Summary
- Airport type: Private
- Owner: Aberdeenshire Council
- Operator: The Buchan Aero Club
- Serves: Longside, Aberdeenshire, Scotland
- Opened: 1941; 85 years ago
- Elevation AMSL: 120 ft / 37 m
- Website: www.buchanaeroclub.co.uk

Map
- Location in Aberdeenshire

Runways
Direction	Length		Surface
Direction	m	ft	Surface
10/28	500	1,640	Asphalt

There was a Royal Navy Air Service base built at Lenabo to the south of the village in 1915–16; it is referred to as RNAS Longside or sometimes RNAS Lenabo. It was the most northerly of the twelve airship stations operated by the Royal Navy to defend the British coast during the First World War. The buildings on the site were extensive and included three airship sheds that were 100 ft (30 m) high and could be seen on the horizon for miles as the land was flat. There were also two 66 ft (20 m) high chimneys as well as stores, workshops and administration areas together with barracks. Unlike most sites constructed for use during the war, which were of an easily removed nature, the buildings at Lenabo were built to last and were heavy concrete and brickwork. The main entrance had two concrete pillars adorned with elaborate globes mounted at the top. There were 1500 personnel based at the station and the facilities included a swimming pool, shops, a theatre and Church. There was also a gas works within the site. The base was disbanded in 1920 and it is now a forestry plantation with little indication of its former use. Longside Community Council raised funds to have a plaque mounted on the remains of a building at the entrance to the site in 2003.

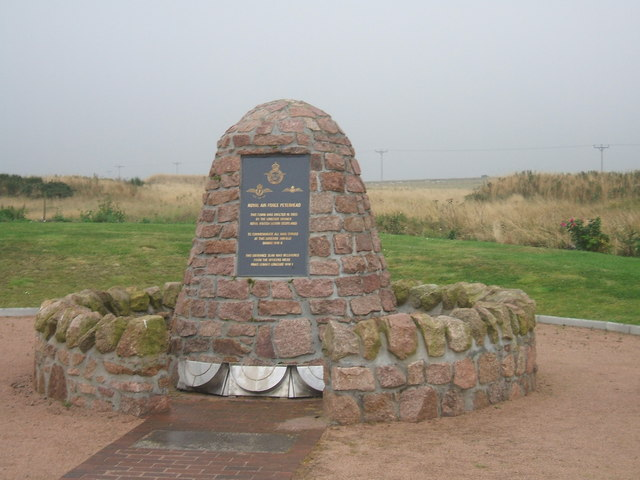
RAF Cairn in memory of WW2 squadron, Longside Airfield

Originally a World War II airfield, Longside Airfield was also known as RAF Peterhead or Peterhead Airfield and is situated to the east of the village adjacent to the A950 road.

The airfield was built in 1941 and disbanded in 1945. During this period there could be up to 2,000 RAF personnel based there including around 250 WAAF. A large number of RAF squadrons from a variety of nations used the five accommodation camps there.

In November 1941 it was hit by two bombs from a Ju 88 bomber causing one person to be killed and three to be injured. Hurricane, Spitfire and Mustang aircraft are recorded as flying from Longside airfield to provide protection for eastern convoys.

During the 1990s, the airfield site was inspected and aerial photographs were taken as part of an assessment for a proposed pipeline running between St Fergus and Peterhead Power Station. These reports and photographs showed pillboxes and many buildings still survived, although most of the land had by then returned to agricultural use. The control tower had been demolished. In November 2004, further investigation was undertaken. The report compared photographs from 1946 which showed the airfield and all its ancillary buildings with photographs taken in June 1969. By then the hangars had been removed but many other buildings and pillboxes still survived. Bond Helicopters and Bristows have used the airfield as a refuelling point for helicopters servicing North Sea oil platforms, roughly a 45-minute flight.

In 2003, after funds were successfully raised by the local branch of the Longside British Legion, a cairn monument was erected in memory of those who had served at RAF Peterhead, Longside airfield. At the time of the unveiling ceremony of the monument on 14 September 2003, there was a flypast from a Dakota of the Battle of Britain Memorial Flight.

More recently a stretch of the runway is used for flying radio-controlled model aircraft.

The airfield is owned by Aberdeenshire Council and on a 99-year lease to a North Sea Helicopter operator through acquisitions. The airfield, which is strictly Prior Permission Required (PPR), is used regularly by the Buchan Aero Club as a goodwill gesture from the helicopter operator. The airfield qualifies for zero business rates through club status and does not operate or promote commercial activity to remain within this agreement.

The airfield's radio frequency is 118.280 MHz (callsign "Longside Radio"). Circuits are at 1,000 ft on Aberdeen QNH; right-hand on runway 10, and left-hand on runway 28.

== Transport ==
Longside was a mainstay of the turnpike system as it was crossed by two turnpikes; one running a mail coach twice a day and a stage coach running between Peterhead and Banff and returning in the evening. The twelve-mile stretch of road from Peterhead to Pitfour and then on to Coilsmore ran through Longside and was completed in 1810. It was partly funded by James Ferguson (the member) but he sold it to a Peterhead merchant, James Hutchison, in January 1809.

== Listed buildings ==
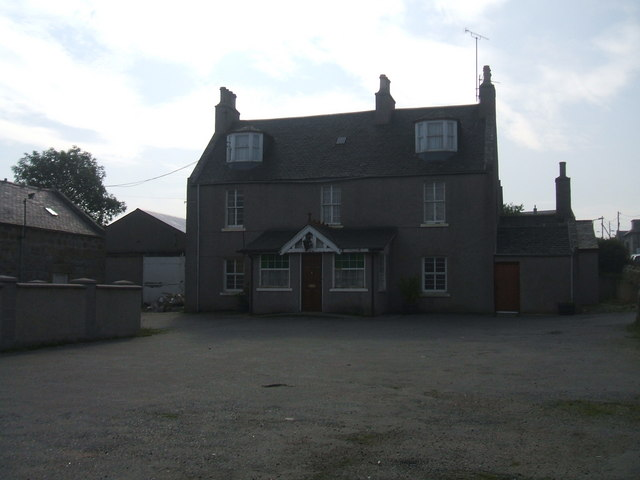
The former Bruce Arms Hotel, pictured in 2006

Both the Old Parish Church dating back to 1620 and the Churchyard Gateway, which is on Inn Brae, are category A listed buildings on the Historic Environment Scotland register. The church was built with rubble and the windows conveyed an unbalanced appearance. The bellcote is thought to date from 1637. The Gateway also dates back to 1620 with the finial at the top added in 1705.

St John's Episcopal Church was built in 1853 to the design of the architect William Hay. Hay was particularly renowned for his work overseas but undertook this work and also built a house in Broad Street, Peterhead for his mother during the same period. St John's is a category B listed building.

The slightly earlier Parish Church at Longside was built in 1835-6 and is also a category B listing. Its construction is attributed to the architect John Smith who undertook a lot of work in the area, including designs for James Ferguson at Pitfour, Peterhead Prison and the remodelling of Slains Castle. A vestry was added to the church in 1889.

=== Other structures ===
The former Bruce Arms Hotel, on Main Street, was built around 1845. Charles McKean noted it on his pre-1990 visit to the village, but it is now closed.

Kininmonth House was built in 1740, while the nearby Kininmonth Church followed about a century later.

The Toll House is in Main Street, Longside; as the Toll House was sympathetically extended in 2008, it still allows the original features of the toll houses to be seen.

== Expansion ==
In 2007, the village was expanded when a residential housing development of 33 houses was undertaken adjacent to Skinner Road, on the western edge of the village opposite the golf course. A further 21 houses were built on the same development in 2008. Further residential development is planned through to 2015.

== Events ==
Each year, an annual gala is held in May. The Longside Gala is the first Gala held in the area each season. Always well supported by the local community, the weekend of events includes activities ranging from a parade, five a side football, netball and Tae Kwon Do. There is an outside stage set up for various entertainments; a gala dance in a marquee on Saturday evening and various events are also held throughout the Sunday.

The Local Community Council works closely with the Gala committee and it also organises an annual Gardens competition, an environmental project which has run for many years. A stretch of the Formartine and Buchan Railway Line runs alongside the village and the Community Council provided seating along the walk, a welcome facility popular with local cyclists, walkers and dog walkers.

== People ==
- George Gatherer Wilson (1872-1949), son of Rev Thomas Lockerby Wilson (1810-1894) of the Free Church of Scotland in Longside. Working in a mission in Peking in the early 1900s he was awarded the Imperial Chinese Order of the Double Dragon by the Emperor in 1911 for his work in the city during the pneumonic plague.
