= Maneuver =

Maneuver (American English), manoeuvre (British English), manoeuver, manœuver (also spelled, directly from the French, as manœuvre) may refer to:

== Military or naval ==
- Maneuver warfare
- Military exercise
- Military strategy
- Military tactics
- Naval strategy
- Naval tactics

== Controlled change in movement ==
- Aerobatic maneuver
- Orbital maneuver

== Skilled movement or procedure ==
- Credé's maneuver
- Gowers's maneuver
- Heimlich maneuver, abdominal thrusts to relieve choking
- Kocher maneuver
- Leopold's maneuvers
- McRoberts maneuver
- Müller's maneuver
- Phalen's maneuver
- Pringle maneuver
- Sellick maneuver
- Valsalva's maneuver

== Other ==
- Moose test
