= Laeca Burn =

Stream in northeastern Aberdeenshire, Scotland

Coordinates: 57.4694°N 1.8780°W

Laeca Burn is a stream in northeastern Aberdeenshire, Scotland. There are numerous archaeological sites in the Laeca Burn watershed, "especially on the eastern side of Laeca Burn", where Catto Long Barrow is situated.

== See also ==
- Hill of Aldie
- Morris Wells
- Skelmuir Hill
- Tumulus
