= Cairn Catto =

Neolithic long cairn

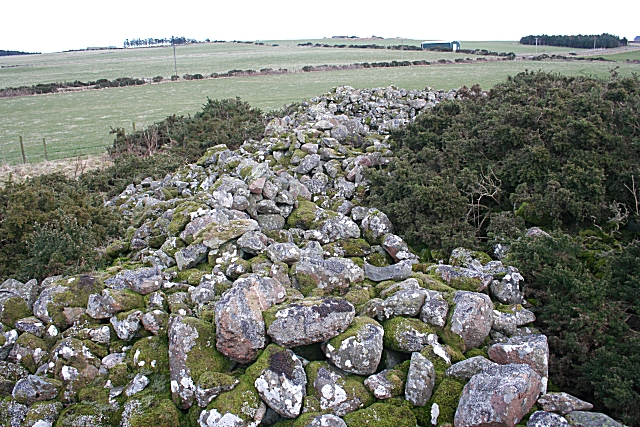
- Photographed in 2010
- Interactive map of Cairn Catto
- 57.4694°N 1.8780°W
- Type: Long cairn
- Periods: Neolithic
- Location: Near Longside, Aberdeenshire, Scotland

Site notes
- Area: 47.18 by 18.28 metres (154.8 ft × 60.0 ft)

Scheduled monument
- Official name: Cairn Catto
- Type: Prehistoric ritual and funerary: long cairn
- Designated: 6 July 1973
- Reference no.: SM3276

Cairn Catto is a Neolithic long cairn near the village of Longside, Aberdeenshire, Scotland. It was designated a scheduled monument by Historic Environment Scotland on 6 July 1973.

== Description ==
Cairn Catto is located southeast of Longside, in Aberdeenshire, Scotland. The site is four miles north-west of Cruden Bay, to the west of the minor road between the A952 and the A950.

The cairn measures about 48 metres (157 ft) in length and tapers in breadth towards the north-west. It is a wedge-shaped cairn aligned north-west to south-east, built of boulders of pink granite. The south-west side of the cairn has been heavily robbed. Various deep holes and quarry scoops are visible at the south-east end where stones have been removed. The Arbuthnot Museum in Peterhead houses two stone axes that were found at Cairn Catto in 1885.

== See also ==
- Longman Hill
- Morris Wells
- Skelmuir Hill
