= Ellon Park and Ride =

Park and ride facility near Ellon, Scotland

Ellon Park and Ride is a park and ride facility near Ellon, UK.

== History ==
The facility opened in 2000. In 2012, expansion plans were approved by the council. In 2014, the first stage of the work was completed with 40 parking spaces added. However, the remainder of the expansion was delayed due to uncertainty over who owned an area of land that was to be compulsorily purchased, and the discovery that a water went across the area to be developed. The COVID-19 pandemic was cited as a reason for further delays. In late 2021, new stances were installed.

The improvement project was completed in October 2022.

== Services ==
=== Current ===
- Buchan Express

=== Withdrawn ===
- 747 Aberdeen Airport–Peterhead
