= Aberdeen Western Peripheral Route =

Road in Scotland

Aberdeen Western Peripheral Route
- City of Aberdeen Bypass

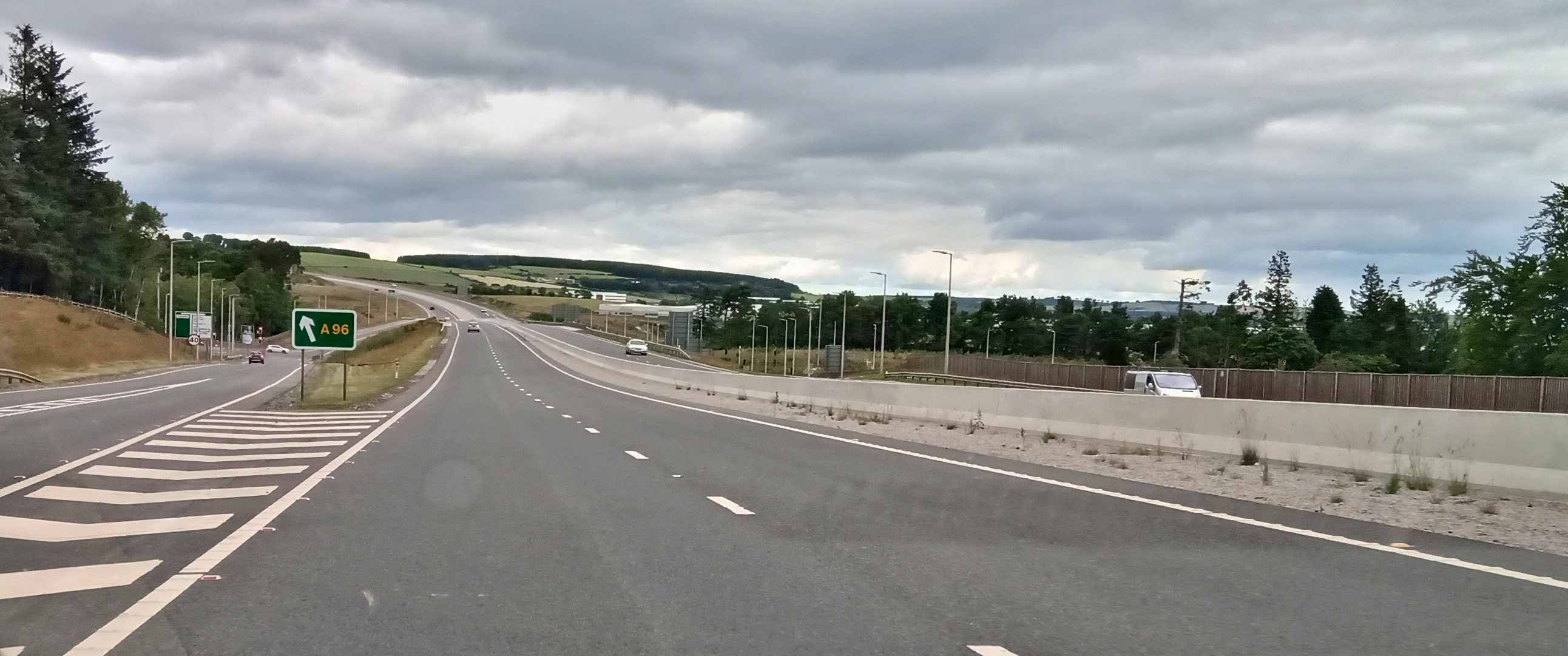
- AWPR (A90) Northern Leg, approaching the A96 junction at Craibstone

Route information
- Maintained by Aberdeen Roads Limited
- Length: 26 mi (42 km)
- Existed: 2015–present
- History: Opened: 2018; Completed: 2019

Major junctions
- South end: A92 north of Stonehaven
- A956 (Trunk Spur) A93 A944; A96 A947
- North end: A92 at Blackdog

Location
- Country: United Kingdom
- Constituent country: Scotland
- Counties: Aberdeen and Aberdeenshire
- Primary destinations: Dundee, Forfar, Stonehaven, Aberdeen, Peterhead and Fraserburgh

Road network
- Roads in the United Kingdom; Motorways; A and B road zones

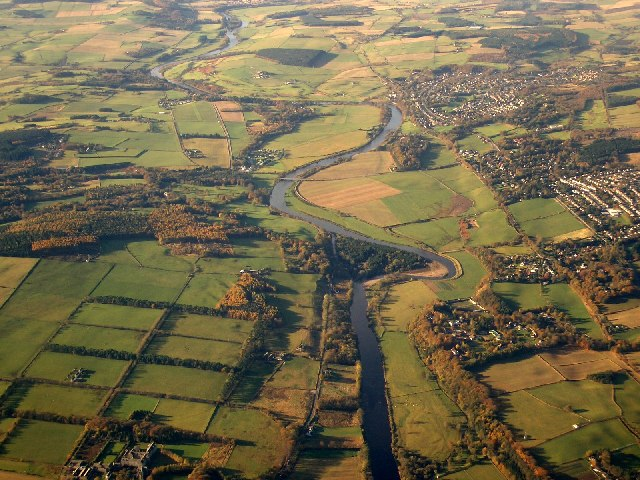
Maryculter Bridge in 2005, prior to the construction of the AWPR. The River Dee Crossing now stands to the east

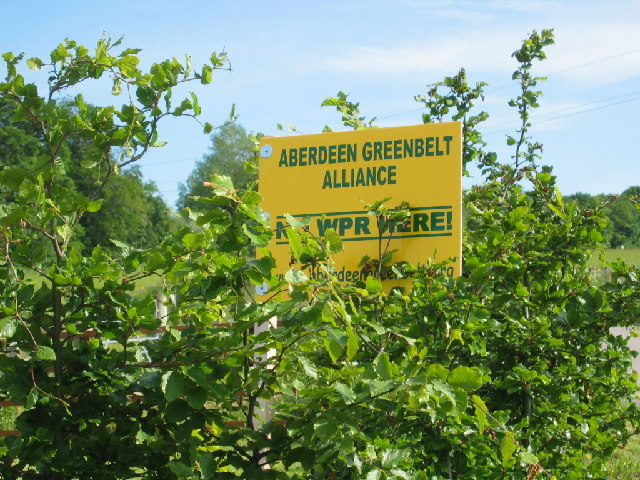
Original Aberdeen Greenbelt Alliance protest poster

The Aberdeen Western Peripheral Route (AWPR), unofficially also the City of Aberdeen Bypass, is a major road that wraps around the city of Aberdeen, Scotland. The road stretches north from Stonehaven through Kincardineshire and crosses both the River Dee and River Don before terminating at Blackdog. The main stretch of the AWPR is 22 miles (35 km) in length.

The AWPR also includes the 4-mile (6.4 km) A956 spur that links the bypass to the A92. The construction of the AWPR was coupled with extensive upgrades to the A90 continuing north with the 9-mile (14 km) Balmedie to Tipperty dual carriageway, supplanting the existing road which was subsequently detrunked and is now the B977. The AWPR's primary route is designated as part of the A90, with the original A90 now renamed the A92, which now connects with the AWPR at both of its ends.

The road is predominantly rural, crossing mainly through farmland and forest while skimming past built-up areas. The AWPR is legally classed as a special road by the Scottish Government. This means that the bypass is governed under motorway restrictions. The road itself is near-motorway grade with all junctions being grade-separated with adjoining slip roads (the only exception being the Cleanhill roundabout), a full-length continuous concrete step barrier, large road signage, legal prohibition of stopping and reversing alongside restriction to Class I and II vehicles, barring non-motorway traffic from using the bypass altogether. The road however lacks hard shoulders and instead includes emergency lay-bys. The regulations governing the AWPR are not those of a standard primary A-road and are very similar to those found on motorways, however the road is not classed as a motorway under its statutory instrument.

The Balmedie to Tipperty road is not part of the bypass despite being built in conjunction with it and therefore not bound by the AWPR's statutory instrument, making it an ordinary dual carriageway. First announced in January 2003, the road was approved by Scottish Ministers in late 2009 with the original costs estimated at between £295 million and £395 million. Construction on the AWPR began on 19 February 2015. The final section opened exactly four years later on 19 February 2019.

== Background ==
Prior to the introduction of the AWPR, the only dual carriageway route heading from north to south was Anderson Drive, the city's original bypass constructed in the 1930s. By the 1950s, Anderson Drive had been swallowed into the rapidly-expanding Aberdeen with the creation of new post-war suburbs such as Northfield, Mastrick and Garthdee. The road was unsuitable for heavy goods vehicles as they could not cross the Bridge of Dee at its south end, therefore large vehicles were forced to detour along the B9077 across King George VI Bridge before returning to Anderson Drive via Broomhill Road, resulting in local and strategic traffic coming into conflict in a built-up area which caused serious safety concerns.

The idea for a new bypass for Aberdeen was first proposed in 1952. Following decades of discussion and low-level planning, the Scottish government's plan to construct the bypass were announced in 2003, by the then first minister. In 2012, following lengthy legal delays, the project was approved. Construction began in February 2015, supported by both Aberdeen and Aberdeenshire councils in addition to Nestrans, the statutory Regional Transport Partnership for Aberdeen and Aberdeenshire. By 2016, the total cost of the bypass was projected to have a significantly higher cost of £745 million.

The AWPR was opened in segments, starting with between the Blackdog and Goval junctions which was soon followed by the Balmedie to Tipperty stretch. By December 2018, the AWPR had fully opened to motorists with the exception of between the Craibstone and Goval junctions which was due to concrete problems at the River Don Crossing. The entire road became operational on 19 February 2019 - later than planned partly due to weather issues and the January 2018 collapse of contractor Carillion. Giving evidence to the Rural Economy and Connectivity Committee in December 2018, a spokesman for Balfour Beatty agreed that the total cost of the bypass could be "in the area of" £1 billion.

== Congestion relief ==
The road was designed to have a positive impact on traffic along routes which are congested during rush hour, particularly Aberdeen's Anderson Drive, King Street and Union Street. Other intentions of this project included slight reductions in traffic congestion on local bridges heading into Aberdeen city centre, which is sandwiched between the Rivers Dee and Don, this would be achieved by reducing the volume of heavy goods vehicles that do not need to enter the city. The project was also intended to dial back the level of traffic heading towards Aberdeen Airport, the adjacent industrial estates at Dyce and the new Aberdeen International Business Park. Aberdeen City Council constructed a new six-lane extension of Argyll Road to connect Aberdeen Airport and the AIBP with the A96 and AWPR, the road opened in late 2016 and is now the B984.

== Inquiry and preparation ==
It was repeatedly argued that the road was important to keep the local economy active. This was in addition to alleviating traffic in the city centre and reducing road accidents.

A public local inquiry (PLI) was held during 2008 to 2009. The PLI recommended adoption of the route and it was subsequently approved by Scottish Ministers, the route passed the Scottish Parliament on 3 March 2010. An appeal was made to the Court of Session based on points including the limited remit of the PLI. The appeal was dismissed, a further appeal was then made to the Inner House, the appellate division of the Court of Session. A yet further appeal was afterwards made to the UK Supreme Court. This appeal also failed to overturn the decision to proceed with the route.

In 2010, the International School of Aberdeen moved to a new campus to make way for the construction of the road. The rebuilding of the school was funded by the Scottish Government.

== Construction ==
=== Contract award ===
On 19 October 2012, a notice was published advising the market that expressions of interest for contractors to construct the route would be made at the beginning of 2013, this was with a view to commence construction of the AWPR in late 2014. The initial shortlist of four preferred bidders was reduced to three with the withdrawal of the Scotia Roads Group consortia in September 2013. This left Granite City Roads (Macquarie Capital Group Limited: Vialia; Iridium; Kier Project Investment Limited), North East Roads Partnership (Cintra Infraestructuras, S.A.; John Laing Investments Limited) and Connect Roads (Balfour Beatty Investments Limited; Carillion Private Finance (Transport) Limited; Galliford Try Investments Limited) as the remaining bidders. Keith Brown, the then Cabinet Secretary for Infrastructure, Investment and Cities also advised that the scheme may open in stages where possible in an effort to relieve existing traffic, with the announcement of the preferred bidder for the contract expected in the summer of 2014.

The official estimate of the cost of the AWPR was initially between £295 to £395 million, although reported figures were in the region of £653 million. Transport Scotland quoted the scheme at £745 million in 2012 prices. The contracts for associated preparatory works were announced on the Public Contracts Scotland website in 2016.

The contract award was announced on 11 June 2014 with Connect Roads, advised by Pinsent Masons, named as the preferred bidder. Advance works were then already underway, with Keith Brown making the announcement of the winning bid from the site of construction works at Findon Junction. A series of public exhibitions around Aberdeen and Aberdeenshire in June 2014 were also announced by Transport Scotland in order to inform the public regarding progress, advance works, the route and environmental aspects. An £8 million "pre-start works agreement" was announced between Transport Scotland and Connect Roads, with the bidder starting fencing, environmental surveying and ground investigations ahead of the main works contract commencing later in the year. Other site clearing works and environmental works, such as the relocation of protected badgers also continued.

The completion of construction works was anticipated in the later half of 2017, about 6 months before the original timescale. The Craibstone roundabout was expected to be completed in the second half of 2016, alongside the Balmedie to Tipperty section a few months later. Main sub-contracts for the construction phase were published on the Public Contracts Scotland website, with most indicated to begin in January 2015. Transport Scotland also added a current activity page to their AWPR/B-T area, which detailed ongoing works on the project.

Local campaigners in Stonehaven raised concerns over the proposed design for the interchange of the existing A90 dual carriageway and the new Fastlink section of the AWPR. A local farmer offered land for free to support an alternative design for the interchange, but Transport Scotland said changes at this point would add delay and jeopardise the now late completion date of 2017, this was due to road orders and other legal instruments having already been made. They also said the alternative design had been considered and discounted by the design team.

=== Project mobilisation ===
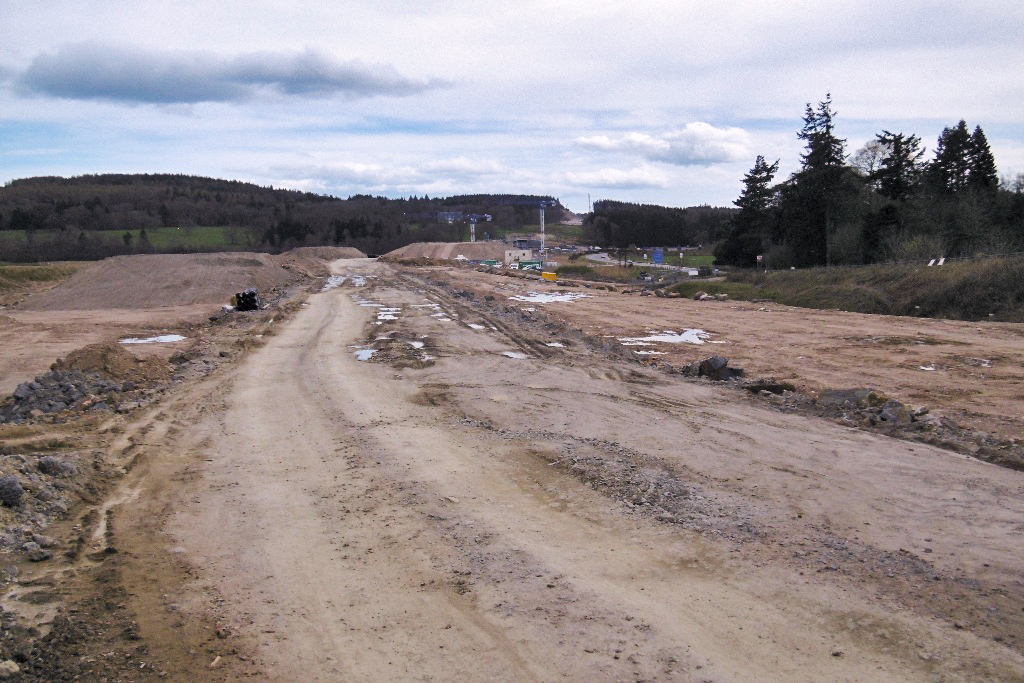
AWPR between Milltimber and Peterculter as photographed during construction

Financial close on the project with the winning bidder, now known as Aberdeen Roads Limited was achieved on 15 December 2014. It was also announced that lifetime costs for the project were down by £220 million thanks to innovative new features on the AWPR such as more durable long-life road surfacing. Aberdeen Roads Limited will construct and operate and maintain the route for a period of 30 years. It was also announced that the consortium would be bringing forward the scheduled completion dates for the Craibstone and Dyce junctions by Autumn 2016, to be soon followed by the Balmedie to Tipperty dual carriageway by the first half of 2017, following requests from stakeholders. Scottish First Minister Nicola Sturgeon, along with Cabinet Secretary Keith Brown, Leader of Aberdeen City Council, Jenny Laing and Leader of Aberdeenshire Council, Jim Gifford attended the site at Balmedie on 16 February 2015 to perform the ceremonial ground-breaking and officially commence the start of the construction programme.

The main site office was constructed at Ury, Stonehaven with a local firm successfully tendering for and providing the temporary accommodation units. Clearance works for the Balmedie site office were performed during the official ground-breaking ceremony and visit of the First Minister, with the first overhead line safety systems being erected and Flannery Plant heavy machinery preparing for the works start. The first major traffic management systems for the works included a new 30 mph speed limit around the local roads in the vicinity of Dyce, Goval and Parkhill. In addition, traffic lights and lane closures on the A93 North Deeside Road at Milltimber Brae during May and June were implemented to allow for trial digs and work concerning the re-routing of utilities. Aberdeen Roads Limited published its first project update newsletter in the spring of 2015, detailing current and future works plus traffic management measures.

=== Project delays and cost overruns ===
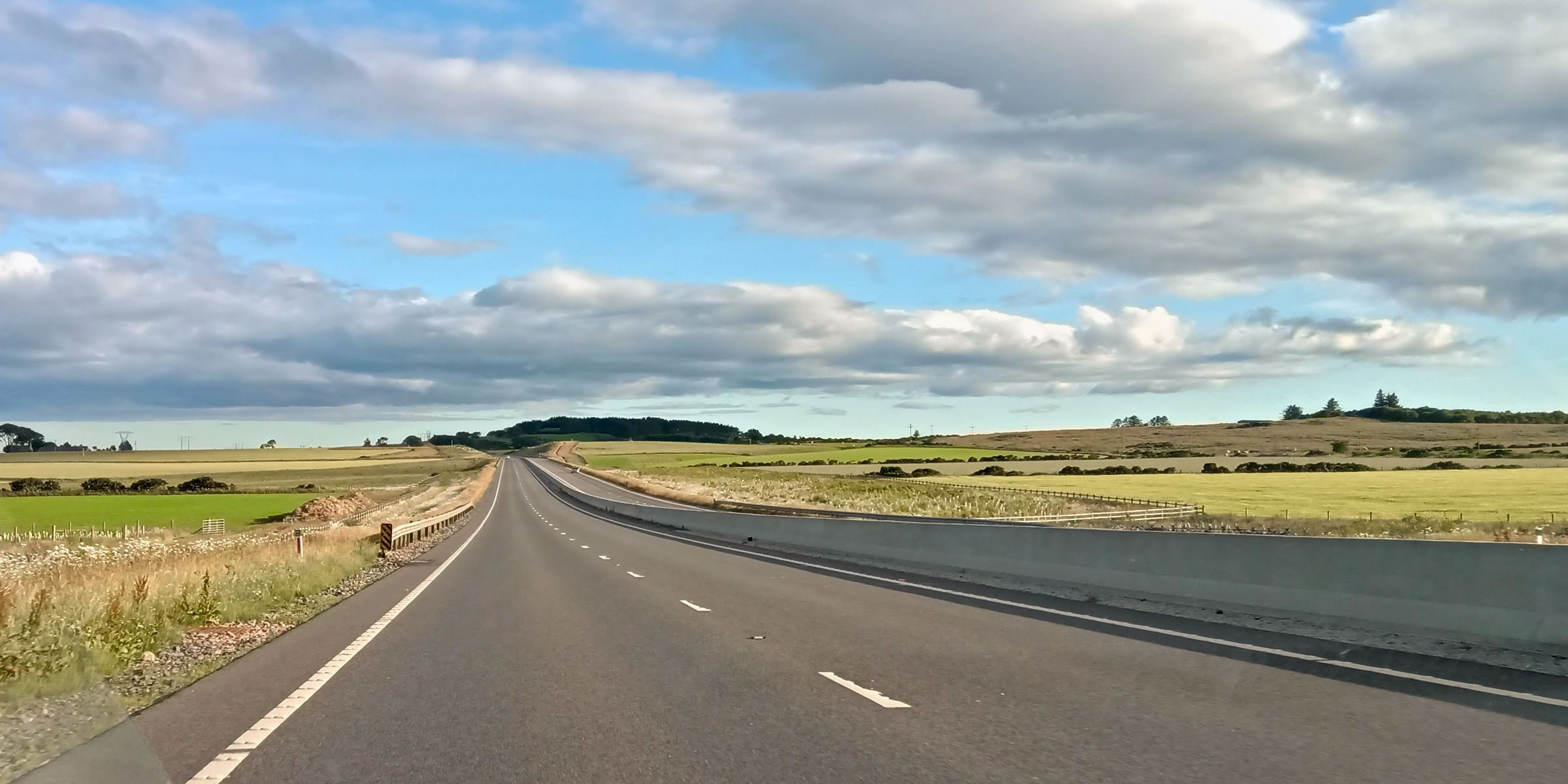
Stonehaven Fast Link, heading southbound

Cost overruns on the project were a contributing factor to the January 2018 collapse of Carillion. Connect Roads joint venture partners Balfour Beatty and Galliford Try became jointly liable for additional cash contribution totalling between £60 and £80 million; Balfour Beatty estimated a lower cost of between £35 and £45 million while Galliford Try sought to raise £150 million and cut its dividend to support its balance sheet claiming Carillion's collapse had "increased the group's total cash commitments on the project by in excess of £150m". In August 2018, Balfour Beatty said its liabilities on the Aberdeen project had risen by a further £23 million and were forecast to reach £135 million. In November 2018, Galliford Try said delays would cost an extra £20 million, taking its total project hit to £143 million.

The first section, a four-mile (7 km) stretch between Parkhill and Blackdog opened in June 2018, and the Balmedie to Tipperty section soon after during August 2018. Carillion's collapse and weather interruptions delayed overall completion of the project; in March 2018, Balfour Beatty said the project would open by the second half of the year, a date which then slipped to December 2018, partly due to problems involving concrete cladding panels at the crossing over the River Don. In December 2018, MSPs heard the final cost of the Aberdeen bypass would exceed £1 billion while a 20-mile (32 km) section of the route would open during the week of 10 December. The majority of the bypass was now open to motorists with the completion of the Stonehaven Fast Link and Southern Leg by mid-December. However the final 4.5-mile (7.2 km) section between Parkhill and Craibstone (which included the Don Crossing), was delayed until after Christmas 2018. With the final section still unopened in the New Year at the end of January 2019, Scottish transport secretary Michael Matheson demanded an urgent meeting with Balfour Beatty and Galliford Try bosses over the continuing delays. The final section opened on 19 February 2019, bringing the four year construction period to a close.

In May 2018, Aberdeenshire Council said it would seek compensation from the Balfour Beatty/Galliford Try joint venture for "significant damage" caused to some local roads by the transport of thousands of tonnes of materials to the AWPR site.

=== Modifications ===
Following a local campaign, a new shared use path was opened allowing users of the Deeside Way to cross the AWPR safely in March 2019. Despite a route being included in public consultations back in 2014, the bypass had opened without a safe path for people using the Deeside Way to cross it.

Due to a high number of road traffic accidents, traffic lights were added to the South Kingswells roundabout in early 2020.

== Junctions ==
In total the bypass consists of nine junctions, two of which are on-grade. However all means of getting on and off the AWPR involve the use of slip roads as opposed to direct intersections which are found on the rest of the A90. Signs listing prohibited classes of traffic are displayed on all access points to the AWPR. Ordinary dual carriageway standards cease and the statutory instrument takes over on entering any one of these slip roads.

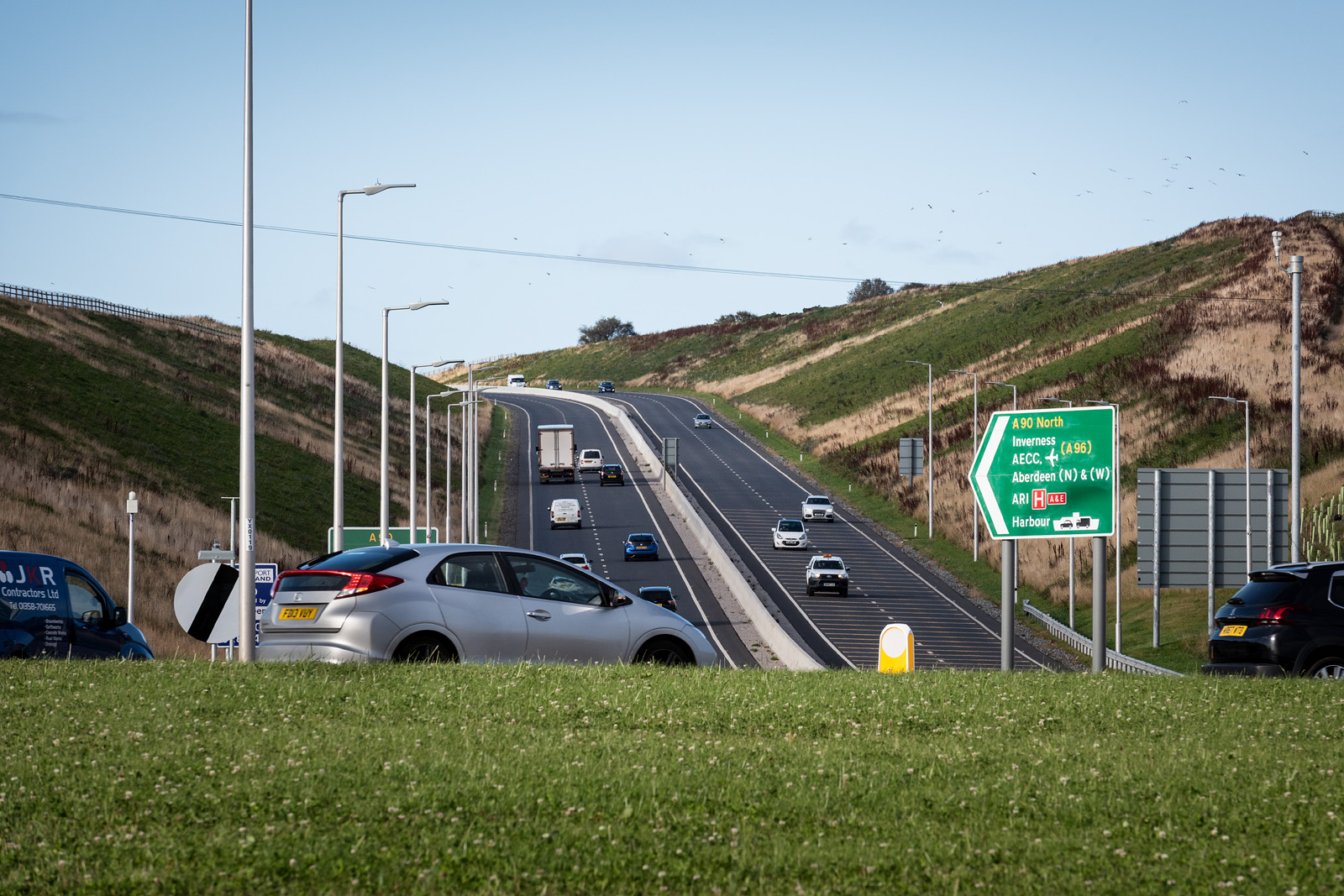
Stonehaven Fast Link as pictured from the roundabout, the difference between the AWPR and the rest of the A90 immediately becomes apparent

=== Junction 1: Stonehaven North ===
Heading north as the Stonehaven bypass, the A90 gradually sweeps around the town towards the east before traffic bound for the AWPR can cross a large flyover, from here there is a turn off to the left via a slip road. Southbound traffic can also come off the dual carriageway to a crossroads and then turn right onto a short stretch of the A90 which passes under the flyover, both of these lead to the Stonehaven roundabout. It is a large three-lane intersection which also provides access to the B979, but most importantly is the starting point of the AWPR. Traffic continuing along the A90 can here turn onto the Fast Link while gaining speed through a steep uphill section. The bypass proceeds sharply northbound; with the exception of some isolated dwellings and occasional local overpasses, the road continues without pause through fields.

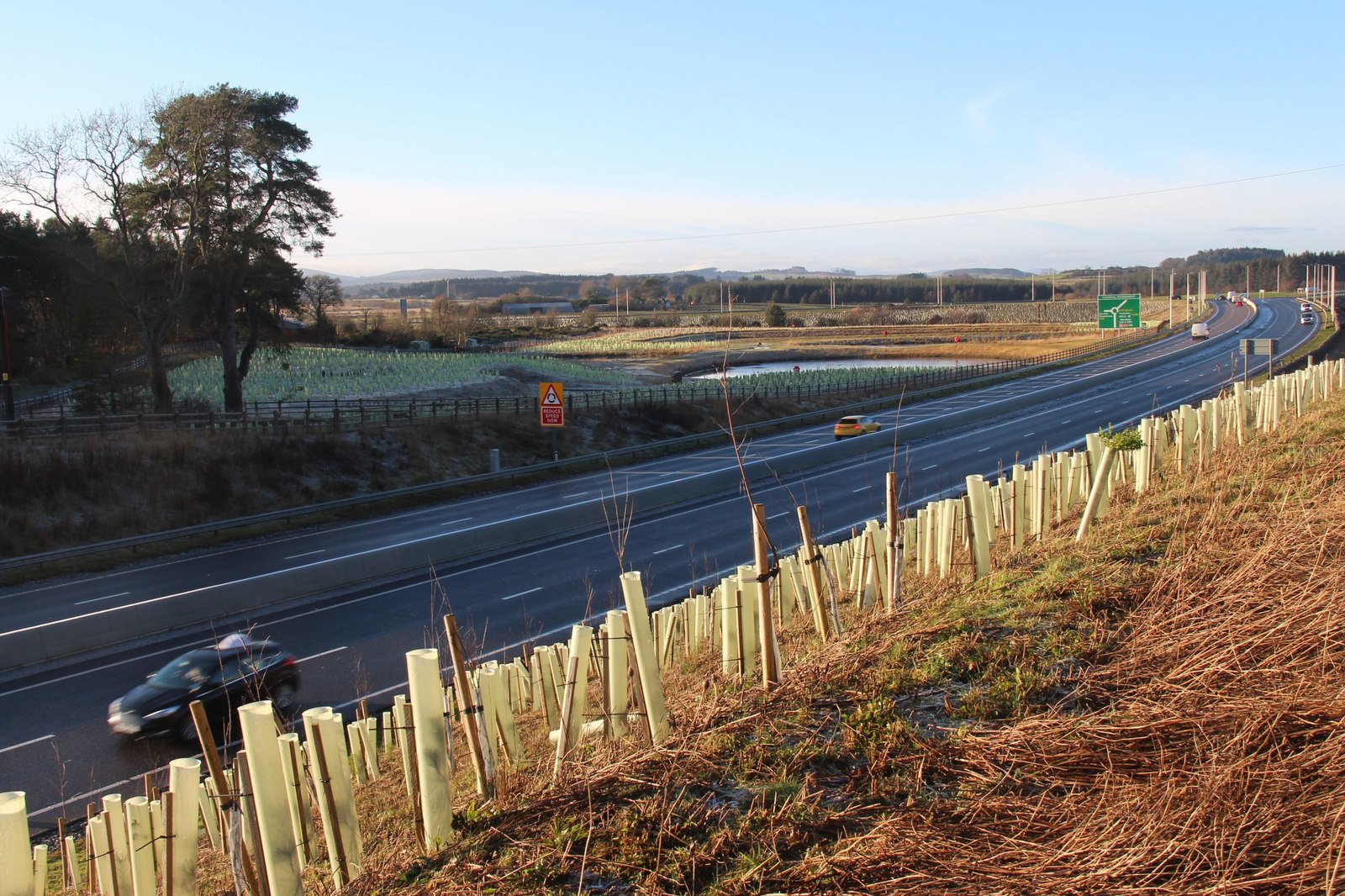
Approaching Cleanhill via the A956

=== Junction 2: Cleanhill ===
Still in Aberdeenshire, the Stonehaven Fast Link terminates at the Cleanhill roundabout. It is the only junction in Scotland where three special road segments converge at one at-grade point, the roundabout itself is slightly smaller than at Stonehaven and instead of three lanes; has two. From here, motorists can continue onto the Southern Leg of the AWPR via the A90 or the A956 Spur. The former heading north through Aberdeen's westernmost suburbs and the latter to the east into the south of the city. Either way, both directions will take drivers into Aberdeen's local authority area. Cleanhill has been recognised as a pressure point on the bypass due to cost-cutting involved in its construction, being deemed necessary at the time by designers due to the topology of the area, local roads and streams discounting the possibility of an overpass which would possibly incur tens of millions of pounds in additional costs. Reluctance from local landowners resulted in project engineers having to work within a very small footprint for a junction of major importance.

The junction has become a spotlight of criticism due to reoccurring accidents which have included collisions between cars and HGVs in addition to vehicles overshooting the roundabout. The design of the roundabout requires motorists to gradually slow down well in advance of reaching it, collisions at this part of the bypass have been attributed by Transport Scotland to speeding and ignoring road signs. It was announced shortly after the full opening of the AWPR that the road's contractor (Aberdeen Roads Ltd.) had been in consultation with Police Scotland and Transport Scotland, the outcome of this was the installation of rumble strips on all approaches to Cleanhill with an additional 50 mph speed limit within the immediate vicinity of the roundabout. Like all other junctions on the bypass, Cleanhill has been future-proofed and is cleared for improvement.

=== Junction 3: Charleston ===
Heading eastbound from Cleanhill takes motorists along the A956 Spur, a special road extension of the primary route which originally started as a trumpet junction on the old A90 that proceeded into Aberdeen. This is still the case today, however the trumpet has since been demolished and replaced with a signal-controlled diamond interchange that provides slip roads onto the A92. Like the Stonehaven Fast Link, the A956 Spur moves in a straight line that is flanked by rural farmland on both sides. On arriving at Charleston, motorists enter the city proper and the bypass terminates. Primary routes then head north, south or east through the A92 and the citybound A956.

=== Junction 4: Deeside ===
Continuing north along the A90 will take motorists across the River Dee and into Aberdeen along the Southern Leg. The A90 then slopes uphill between the suburbs of Peterculter and Milltimber, passing underneath the Deeside Way. Slip roads in both directions connect the AWPR to a roundabout and a short spur of the A93 on its western side, access to Aberdeenshire and the Cairngorms is gained here at a signalised crossroads. Southbound traffic utilises a flyover to join or leave the bypass, whereas northbound traffic turns on or off the side of the road. The creation of this junction has resulted in the re-alignment of the B979, drivers can still use this route to gain access to local roads in Aberdeenshire. Since the AWPR opened, Peterculter is now the only built-up area in the city which is outside of the road.

=== Junction 5: South Kingswells ===
The AWPR continues unabated through rural landscape before reaching South Kingswells. Unlike other junctions, this is an ordinary roundabout interchange such as those found on motorways. The A944 provides access to Westhill, Kingswells, Countesswells, Prime Four Business Park and the West End of the city. The A90 continues overhead with long slip roads providing entry to and from the A944. Tailbacks and collisions at this junction resulted in the addition of traffic lights to the roundabout which was carried out in the summer of 2020, later than expected due to the COVID-19 pandemic. The lack of existing infrastructure prior to construction resulted in no concessions having to be made during the design process. From here, the bypass heads slightly north-east past Brimmond Hill.

=== Junction 6: North Kingswells ===
A half-diamond intersection that connects to the C89C Chapel of Stoneywood - Fairley Road, the only part of the AWPR that provides access to an unclassified road. It is also the only one on the AWPR where only traffic coming to and from the north have access, vehicles heading to or from the south must use either the South Kingswells or Craibstone junctions to come on or off the A90. The C89C also forms the locally-named "Kingswells Bypass" which can be used to reach the A944. The slip roads at this junction do not merge into the road, they continue along the sides to Craibstone; making this section of the bypass the only one with six lanes in total. At this point, the Northern Leg of the AWPR begins.

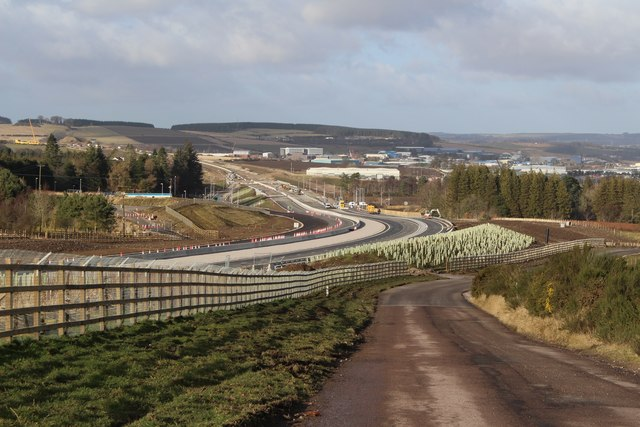
Craibstone Interchange looking north, the Kirkhill Industrial Estate can be seen in the distance

=== Junction 7: Craibstone ===
The largest junction on the A90 as a whole. Craibstone consists of a diamond interchange and three-lane roundabout which are connected by a short trunk spur. Access to the A96, B984 and C89C is made available here. The A96 continues north-west into Aberdeenshire, the dual carriageway segment ends at Port Elphinstone however the road continues to Inverness where it terminates at Raigmore. The citybound A96 takes motorists back into Aberdeen where it meets the A92 at the Haudagain roundabout and terminates at Mounthooly in the city centre. Within the vicinity of Craibstone, access is supplied to Aberdeen International Airport along the B984 Argyll Road, Craibstone Park and Ride, Bucksburn, Dyce and the P&J Live. The Craibstone roundabout was one of the first sections of the bypass to open in order to continue the traffic flow through the A96. The A90 continues past Craibstone and Kirkhill Forest before curving back east across the River Don Crossing.

=== Junction 8: Parkhill ===
Motorists reach Parkhill after crossing the River Don and entering Aberdeenshire again, it is the northernmost junction on the AWPR. The A90 is connected to the A947 on the northbound side while the B977 serves southbound traffic from Blackdog. Both sides consist of long slip roads connecting to roundabouts which can then be used to head back south to Dyce and Bridge of Don or north to Newmachar. Unlike other intersections on the bypass, Parkhill is spread out over a wide area. The road continues east back into the city's border before crossing back into Aberdeenshire at Blackdog.

=== Junction 9: Blackdog ===
The northern terminus of the AWPR, it is a roundabout interchange similar to South Kingswells junction; however it serves more unclassified routes. Access to Blackdog is provided here alongside the C1C that takes drivers to Potterton and Belhevie. Despite the remoteness of the junction, continual traffic flow from the A92 and the A90 can make this junction congested at times. The bypass and its restrictions end on arriving at Blackdog, from here motorists can continue north along the realigned A90 to Balmedie and Ellon or head south onto the detrunked A92 that will return to the city.

== Public transport ==
In January 2019, two bus services were introduced on the AWPR by Stagecoach. Service 747 ran from Montrose to Ellon via Aberdeen Airport, with some services continuing to Peterhead. Service 757 ran from Newtonhill and Portlethen to the airport. In August 2019, it was announced that service 757 would be withdrawn. In April 2020, the 747 service between Stonehaven and the airport was withdrawn. There was no public transport using the AWPR until July 2025, when Ember announced route E11, which uses the Airport - Peterculter part of the road.

== See also ==
- New Aberdeen Stadium, a major construction project for the local football club sited alongside the AWPR at the A944
