= Aberdeen International Business Park =

Coordinates: 57.195382°N 2.206771°W

Aberdeen International Business Park (AIBP) is a major commercial building project located on the south eastern edge of Aberdeen International Airport, at Dyce, with direct road links to the Scottish motorway network, and close to Dyce railway station. The park's 40 acres will eventually provide up to 92,000 sq m of development, including offices, shops, leisure facilities and at least one 4-star hotel.

AIBP's first phase set records in 2014 as Scotland's biggest single office-letting deal, after Norwegian oilfield services giant Aker Solutions leased 31,100 sq m of space, including its own purpose-built leisure facilities.

== Amenities ==
The current Phase 1 building includes:

- Coffee Shop
- Restaurant
- Juice Bar
- Nursery
- Gym
- Sports Hall
- Outdoor Sports Pitch
- Squash Courts

== History of the site ==
Plans for the Aberdeen Western Peripheral Route (AWPR) outlined in early 2013's Aberdeen Airport Master Plan, opened up access to 93 acres of farmland to the south east of the airport.

Also contained in the plan was the construction of a link road between Dyce Drive and the existing A96 as part of the expansion of Aberdeen Airport at Dyce, making this parcel more accessible both to the airport and the wider road network to the city of Aberdeen and beyond.

The final section of the Aberdeen Western Peripheral Route between Craibstone and Parkhill, opened to traffic in Feb 2019, providing road users’ access to the entire 36 mile (58 km) route.

This dual carriageway has significantly reduced congestion and improved accessibility to the wider Dyce area. The City Council also commissioned a new six-lane Airport Link Road (ALR) together with an adjacent 1,000 space Park and Ride facility which opened in Aug 2016, connecting Aberdeen Airport and AIBP with the A96 and AWPR.

Aberdeen City Council's planning committee approved Aberdeen International Business Park’s first phase in June 2013, to include 27,400 sq m of office space and 3,700 sq m of leisure space, containing dining facilities, a day nursery, fitness amenities and a small shop.

The entire 31,100 sq m was leased to Norwegian oilfield services giant Aker Solutions in August 2014 in what was Scotland's single largest office leasing deal. The initial rent, under the 20-year lease, was struck at almost £8 million per annum.

The developer of AIBP is Fornebuporten UK AS, a subsidiary of Norwegian investment company Aker ASA, in a joint venture with Abstract Group. The architect for Phase 1 was Keppie Design and the main contractors were Bowmer & Kirkland.

In May 2015, plans to relocate the Aberdeen Exhibition and Conference Centre from its current Bridge of Don site to a nearby plot at the junction of Dyce Drive and the main A96 trunk road, on the site of the former Rowett Institute, were presented to the city council. AECC is Aberdeen's largest Conference Centre and home to the biennial Offshore Europe exhibition, a major conference in the global oil and gas calendar. The £333 million project is a joint venture between Aberdeen City Council and developer Henry Boot. The new facility opened in summer 2019.

== Phase 2 ==
When completed, AIBP 2 will comprise about 66,500 sq m in total with seven office buildings including at least one 6,600 sq m 4-star hotel, opposite Aberdeen Airport. There are also plans for more than 2,000 car-parking spaces for the office premises.
