= X60 =

X60 may refer to:

- Lifan X60, a 2011–present Chinese compact SUV
- SL X60, a commuter train used in Stockholm, Sweden
- ThinkPad X60, a series of laptops and tablets
- Saber Radar X60, an air defense radar unit developed by the Brazilian Army
- Williston Municipal Airport, located in Williston, Florida, United States, IATA code X60
- Generation Orbit X-60, an air-launched single stage suborbital rocket vehicle
- X60, a bus route in Scotland operated under the Buchan Express brand
- X60, the ICD-10-CM diagnosis code for Suicide by poisoning
