= Haddigan =

Haddigan may refer to:

- Flynn Haddigan, stage name Bl3ss, English DJ and producer
- Mark Haddigan, British actor

== See also ==
- Haudagain roundabout, Aberdeen
