= Seagate bus station =

Bus station in Dundee, Scotland

Dundee City Centre Seagate Bus Station
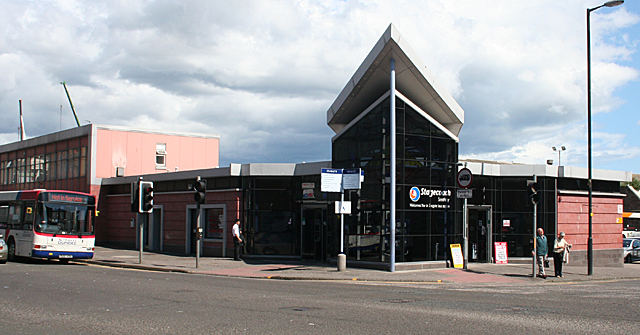
- Bus station in 2011

General information
- Other names: Dundee Bus Station or Seagate Bus Station
- Location: 132 Seagate, Dundee, DD1 2HR; Dundee; Scotland
- Coordinates: 56.46324°N 2.96563°W
- Transit authority: Transport Scotland
- Bus stands: 8
- Bus operators: Stagecoach South Scotland; Megabus Europe; Scottish Citylink
- Connections: Dundee railway station (800 metres)

Other information
- Status: Staffed

History
- Opened: 1956
Location

Seagate Bus Station serves Dundee, Scotland. It has eight stances. The Seagate Bus Station is the main stop for journeys leaving the city, run by Stagecoach South Scotland. Apart from Megabus and Citylink, no other bus companies go through or stop at Seagate Bus Station.

The station was opened in 1958, replacing W. Alexander & Sons' bus station on Lindsay Street and South Ward Road.

Located a five minutes' walk east from Dundee's High Street, it has bus links to many Scottish towns and cities. It also serves as a home to a café, newsagents, and public toilets.

The bus station is located about 100 metres to the east of the site of the 1906 Dundee fire.

== Services ==
=== Stagecoach South Scotland ===
A list of bus services from the bus station run by Stagecoach South Scotland with information found on the Stagecoach Website.

- X7 Coastrider to Aberdeen
- 16/B to Perth
- 20/C to Kirriemuir or Glamis
- 21/A/B/D to Kirriemuir or Glamis
- 22 to Kirriemuir
- 40 to Glenrothes
- 41 to Cupar
- 42 to Tayport
- 46 to Kirkcaldy
- 57 to Coupar Angus
- 57/A to Perth
- 59 to Blairgowrie
- 99/99S to St Andrews

==== Citylink ====
A list of bus services from the bus station run by Citylink and Megabus with information found on the Megabus Website & Citylink Website.

- M8 to Glasgow
- M9 to Glasgow or Aberdeen
- M92 to Edinburgh or Aberdeen

=== Other Services ===
Other services run by Xplore Dundee, Moffat & Williamson, Flixbus & Ember stop elsewhere from the bus station instead of entering it.
