= Craibstone Park and Ride =

Park and ride facility near Dyce, Scotland

Coordinates: 57°11′33.27″N 2°12′48.12″W

Craibstone Park and Ride is a park and ride facility near Dyce, Scotland. It is one of three such facilities near the city of Aberdeen, the other two being situated at Kingswells and Bridge of Don.

== History ==
The Park and Ride was expected to open in autumn 2016, but was delayed. On 30 January 2017, the route of the existing Jet 727 bus service was adjusted to serve the new Park and Ride. However, in May 2017 the change was reverted. On 13 June 2017, the waiting room building was opened.

The number 16 bus operated by First Aberdeen served the Park and Ride until its withdrawal in 2018 due to low passenger numbers.

== Usage ==
In 2019, only one bus service called at the facility, the half-hourly number 37. It has since ceased calling at the facility. In 2019, a freedom of information request revealed that an average of 14 cars per day used the Park and Ride in 2017, and eight cars per day in 2018. A councillor from Aberdeen City Council cited declining bus passenger numbers across Scotland.

== Facilities ==
The Park and Ride is located at the junction between the A90 and the A96. It was built at a cost of £15.2 million and has a capacity of 996 vehicles. A building contains a waiting room, toilets, bicycle lockers, and showers.
