= Kirkhill Forest =

Forest in Scotland

Coordinates: 57.194262°N 2.241597°W

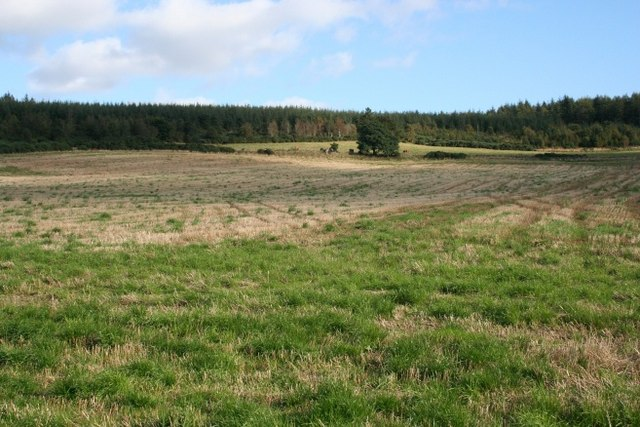
Looking Towards Kirkhill Forest

Kirkhill Forest is a forest in Aberdeenshire, Scotland, situated to the north-west of Aberdeen, on the north side of the A96 between the villages of Dyce and Blackburn. Kirkhill is a working forest with a network of paths for walking, a permanent orienteering trail, and a mountain bike fun park. The forest includes the Tappie Tower, a 19th-century folly offering panoramic views across the surrounding area.
