= Dyce =

Suburb town of Aberdeen, Scotland

Coordinates: 57.2031°N 2.1920°W

Dyce: Scottish Gaelic: Deis
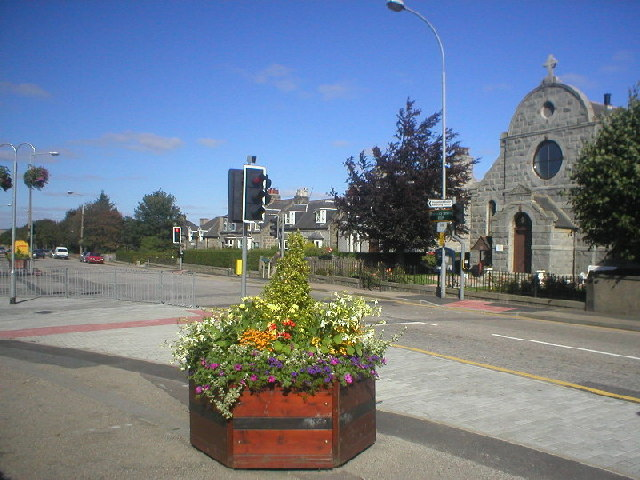

- Location within the City of Aberdeen
- Population: 6,350 (2020)
- Language: English; Scots (Doric)
- OS grid reference: NJ885125
  - Edinburgh: 99 mi (159 km)
  - London: 408 mi (657 km)
- Council area: Aberdeen
- Lieutenancy area: Aberdeen
- Country: Scotland
- Sovereign state: United Kingdom
- Post town: Aberdeen
- Postcode district: AB21
- Dialling code: 01224
- Police: Scotland
- Fire: Scottish
- Ambulance: Scottish
- UK Parliament: Aberdeen North
- Scottish Parliament: Aberdeen Donside
- Website: aberdeencity.gov.uk

Dyce (Scottish Gaelic: Deis) is a suburban town in Aberdeen, Scotland, situated on the River Don about 6 mi (10 km) northwest of the city centre. It is best known as the location of Aberdeen Airport.

== History ==
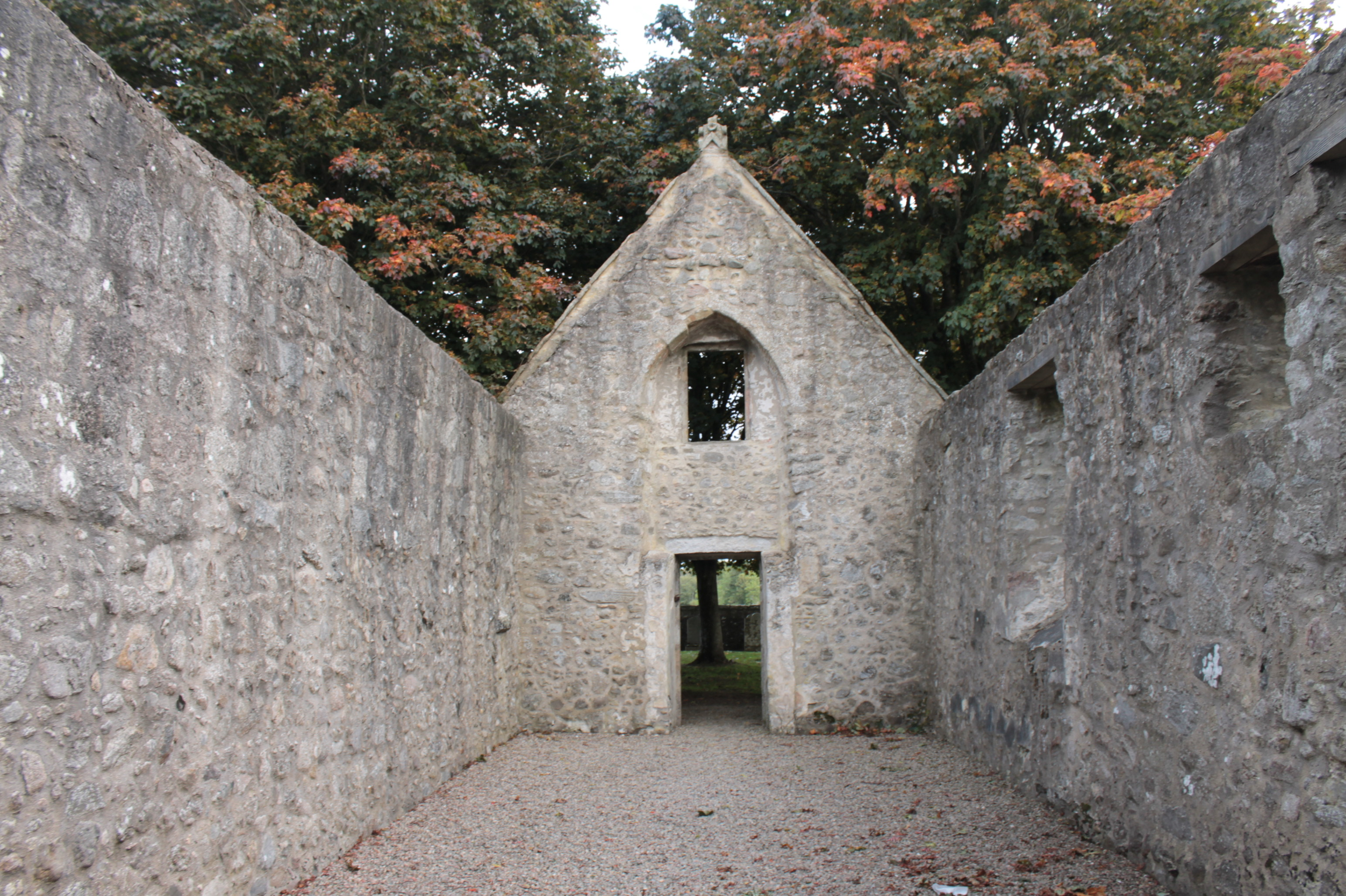
Old Dyce church interior

Dyce is the site of an early medieval church dedicated to the 8th century missionary and bishop Saint Fergus, otherwise associated with Glamis, Angus. Today the cemetery, north of the airport, and overlooking the River Don, hosts the roofless but otherwise virtually complete former St Fergus Chapel. Within the chapel, Pictish and early Christian stones from the 7th–9th centuries, found in or around the churchyard, are displayed (Historic Scotland; open at all times without entrance charge).

The chapel is a unicameral late medieval building with alterations perhaps of the 17th or 18th century. Two further carved stones, of uncertain (though probably early) origin, were discovered re-used as building rubble in the inner east gable and outer south wall during the chapel's restoration. They were left in situ and are readily visible. A broken font, somewhat resembling a round-backed chair in its present condition, lies outside the site of the church, and may also be of early medieval date.

The graveyard surrounding the old church was used into the 20th century, and retains almost no old gravestones. There is a small morthouse in one corner of the enclosure, which is adjoined by a modern extension, still in use for burials. During World War I conscientious objectors laboured at Dyce Work Camp at Dyce Quarries. One of these is believed to be the Tyrebagger Quarry just north of Aberdeen to the east of the A96.

A major employer in the village was the firm Lawsons which was a meat producer, mainly of pork and ham. In the 1920s a small local farmers' cooperative, which had been mothballed, was taken over by the Lawson family, originally from Dunfermline. The site was developed and eventually employed around 1,800 people at its peak. They supplied products throughout Scotland and had a major contract to supply Marks & Spencer under licence. Lawsons closed the factory in 1986. McIntosh of Dyce later operated the factory until 2002.

== Climate ==
Climate data for Dyce-Aberdeen (ABZ), (Note: Weather station is located 6 miles (10 km) from the Aberdeen city centre.) elevation: 65 m or 213 ft, 1981–2010 normals, extremes 1960–present
Month	Jan	Feb	Mar	Apr	May	Jun	Jul	Aug	Sep	Oct	Nov	Dec	Year
Record high °C (°F)	17.2 (63.0)	17.2 (63.0)	21.6 (70.9)	23.7 (74.7)	24.4 (75.9)	26.7 (80.1)	29.8 (85.6)	29.7 (85.5)	26.0 (78.8)	22.1 (71.8)	18.8 (65.8)	15.1 (59.2)	29.8 (85.6)
Mean daily maximum °C (°F)	6.5 (43.7)	6.8 (44.2)	8.8 (47.8)	10.9 (51.6)	13.6 (56.5)	16.1 (61.0)	18.5 (65.3)	18.3 (64.9)	15.8 (60.4)	12.4 (54.3)	8.9 (48.0)	6.6 (43.9)	12.0 (53.6)
Daily mean °C (°F)	3.6 (38.5)	3.8 (38.8)	5.4 (41.7)	7.2 (45.0)	9.7 (49.5)	12.4 (54.3)	14.7 (58.5)	14.4 (57.9)	12.2 (54.0)	9.2 (48.6)	5.9 (42.6)	3.7 (38.7)	8.5 (47.3)
Mean daily minimum °C (°F)	0.6 (33.1)	0.8 (33.4)	1.9 (35.4)	3.4 (38.1)	5.7 (42.3)	8.6 (47.5)	10.8 (51.4)	10.5 (50.9)	8.6 (47.5)	5.9 (42.6)	2.9 (37.2)	0.7 (33.3)	5.1 (41.2)
Record low °C (°F)	−19.3 (−2.7)	−18.2 (−0.8)	−15.8 (3.6)	−6.8 (19.8)	−4.2 (24.4)	−0.3 (31.5)	0.1 (32.2)	−0.2 (31.6)	−2.4 (27.7)	−4.4 (24.1)	−15.6 (3.9)	−18.1 (−0.6)	−19.3 (−2.7)
Average precipitation mm (inches)	67.6 (2.66)	55.1 (2.17)	59.8 (2.35)	58.8 (2.31)	56.9 (2.24)	61.2 (2.41)	61.6 (2.43)	60.5 (2.38)	67.9 (2.67)	96.2 (3.79)	93.3 (3.67)	76.1 (3.00)	814.9 (32.08)
Average precipitation days (≥ 1.0 mm)	12.3	10.5	11.6	10.8	10.6	10.4	11.4	10.7	10.5	13.6	13.8	12.3	138.6
Mean monthly sunshine hours	58.3	81.3	121.8	149.4	199.4	166.4	165.3	157.8	123.7	99.8	66.2	46.1	1,435.7
Source 1: Met Office
Source 2: KNMI

Climate data for Dyce-Aberdeen (ABZ), (Note: Weather station is located 6 miles (10 km) from the Aberdeen city centre.) elevation: 65 m or 213 ft, 1961-1990 normals and extremes
Month	Jan	Feb	Mar	Apr	May	Jun	Jul	Aug	Sep	Oct	Nov	Dec	Year
Record high °C (°F)	14.6 (58.3)	16.6 (61.9)	20.4 (68.7)	23.7 (74.7)	24.3 (75.7)	26.6 (79.9)	28.0 (82.4)	28.4 (83.1)	24.5 (76.1)	21.3 (70.3)	18.8 (65.8)	15.7 (60.3)	28.4 (83.1)
Mean daily maximum °C (°F)	5.7 (42.3)	6.0 (42.8)	8.0 (46.4)	10.3 (50.5)	13.0 (55.4)	16.3 (61.3)	17.8 (64.0)	17.7 (63.9)	15.5 (59.9)	12.5 (54.5)	8.2 (46.8)	6.5 (43.7)	11.5 (52.6)
Daily mean °C (°F)	2.7 (36.9)	2.9 (37.2)	4.5 (40.1)	6.3 (43.3)	9.0 (48.2)	12.1 (53.8)	13.8 (56.8)	13.6 (56.5)	11.7 (53.1)	9.0 (48.2)	5.0 (41.0)	3.5 (38.3)	7.8 (46.1)
Mean daily minimum °C (°F)	−0.3 (31.5)	−0.2 (31.6)	1.1 (34.0)	2.4 (36.3)	5.1 (41.2)	8.0 (46.4)	9.8 (49.6)	9.6 (49.3)	7.9 (46.2)	5.5 (41.9)	1.9 (35.4)	0.6 (33.1)	4.3 (39.7)
Record low °C (°F)	−19.3 (−2.7)	−18.2 (−0.8)	−15.8 (3.6)	−6.8 (19.8)	−4.2 (24.4)	−0.1 (31.8)	0.1 (32.2)	−0.2 (31.6)	−2.4 (27.7)	−4.3 (24.3)	−15.6 (3.9)	−14.2 (6.4)	−19.3 (−2.7)
Average precipitation mm (inches)	82.0 (3.23)	51.0 (2.01)	58.0 (2.28)	53.0 (2.09)	59.0 (2.32)	53.0 (2.09)	60.0 (2.36)	75.0 (2.95)	68.0 (2.68)	77.0 (3.03)	75.0 (2.95)	73.0 (2.87)	784 (30.86)
Average precipitation days (≥ 1.0 mm)	13.0	10.0	12.0	11.0	10.0	9.0	11.0	11.0	11.0	11.0	13.0	13.0	135
Average snowy days	8.0	7.0	6.0	4.0	0	0	0	0	0	trace	3.0	6.0	34
Average relative humidity (%)	82.5	80.5	78.5	77.5	78.0	78.0	78.0	80.0	80.5	82.5	82.5	82.5	80.1
Mean monthly sunshine hours	51.7	72.8	112.0	145.5	176.3	173.2	157.2	151.3	115.6	93.4	62.3	42.5	1,353.8
Source: NOAA

== Economy ==
Dyce has one main shopping centre which includes an Asda store, with a Boots chemist, a hairdresser, a charity shop, an optometrist and several empty units.

=== Oil ===
Aker Solutions, the Norway-based oilfield services giant, runs its UK operations from Dyce, at the Aberdeen International Business Park. The North Sea headquarters of BP are located at the Farburn Industrial Estate.

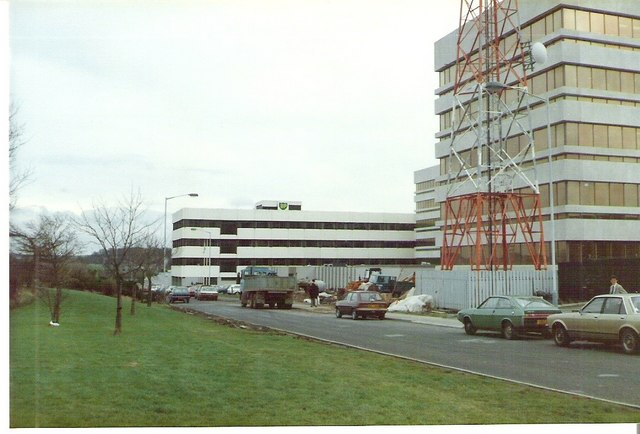
BP (British Petroleum) offices in 1985

All of BP's UK fields are operated from the office building pictured. The Queen, the Duke of Edinburgh, Harold Wilson (Prime Minister) and Prince Andrew came to the BP offices on 3 November 1975 to switch on the supply of oil from the BP Forties Oil Field. The oil came inland at Cruden Bay, and ended up 130 miles away at Grangemouth Refinery. Development of the field had cost around £750m. Britain became self-sufficient in oil by 1980. The Auk oilfield was the next main field to bring oil ashore.

Charles III, then Prince Charles, visited Dyce on 3 September 1992 to BP to officially inaugurate the Miller oilfield; he later met people with the Prince's Scottish Youth Business Trust (now called Youth Business Scotland).

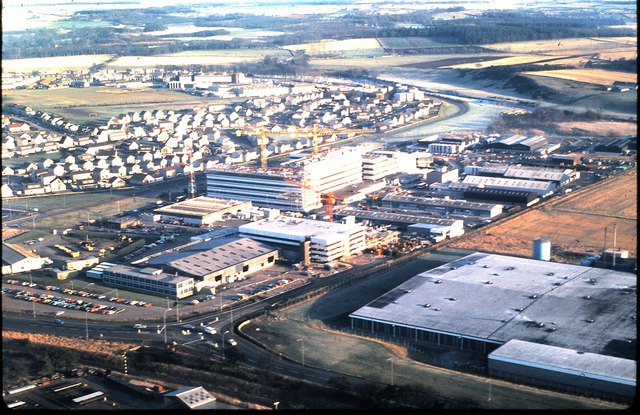
BPPD (BP Petroleum Development) offices seen from the air in November 1981

== Transport ==
Aberdeen Airport (ABZ) is located in Dyce. Dyce railway station is served by ScotRail trains on the Aberdeen to Inverness Line. The Aberdeen Airport grounds are also home to the heliport, which is the busiest heliport in the world.

The Formartine and Buchan Way, a pedestrian and cycle path, starts at Dyce railway station and continues to Newmachar, Ellon, and onward to Peterhead and Fraserburgh. It follows the trackbed of the former Formartine and Buchan Railway.

The Aberdeen Western Peripheral Route circles west and north of the suburb.

== Education ==
The local secondary school, Dyce Academy, has about 500 pupils. Dyce Academy is home to the Aberdeen City Music School. There is also a primary school, Dyce Primary School.

Dyce was the location for the Cordyce School, a secondary school serving pupils who require additional support, primarily those with behavioural difficulties. In November 2017, Cordyce School suffered extensive damage following a fire that engulfed most of the building. following the fire, four young boys, three aged fifteen and one aged fourteen, were charged. The grounds Cordyce School was formerly on suffered more fire damage in 2020. The Cordyce grounds have since had homes built upon them, also construction is incomplete as of 2026.

Dyce was also the location for Carden School, which was located near the Dyce Primary School grounds. The building closed for educational purposes in 2010 but continued to be used for other activities, specifically storage. Demolition of the building began in 2025. Aberdeen City Council, which manages public schools in Dyce, cited health and safety concerns being the reason for its demolition.

== Parks and recreation ==
The area of Aberdeen has sports facilities including the local junior football team Dyce F.C who currently play in the Scottish Junior Football Association North Region and the cricket team.

Dyce (Aberdeen) Amateur Swimming Club (established 1977) runs its own Swim School. It is based at the Dyce Academy swimming pool. The club and swim school are both affiliated to the Scottish Amateur Swimming Association to help swimmers compete up to North District and Scottish National Level.

== People from Dyce ==
- Alexander Chalmers (1645–1703), Mayor of Warsaw, Poland
- Rev William Robinson Pirie (1804–1885) Minister of Dyce 1830 to 1846, Principal of Aberdeen University and Moderator of the General Assembly of the Church of Scotland in 1864.
- Dr James Edward Crombie FRSE (1862–1932), philanthropist and seismologist, of the Crombie clothing empire, lived at Parkhill House just outside Dyce.

Duncan Liddell (1561–1613) Mathematician, settled on the Pitmedden Estate, Dyce 1607. In 1612 he gave land to the University of Aberdeen for the education and support of six poor scholars. Monument erected on the Pitmedden Estate 1614.
