= X7 Coastrider =

Bus route in Scotland

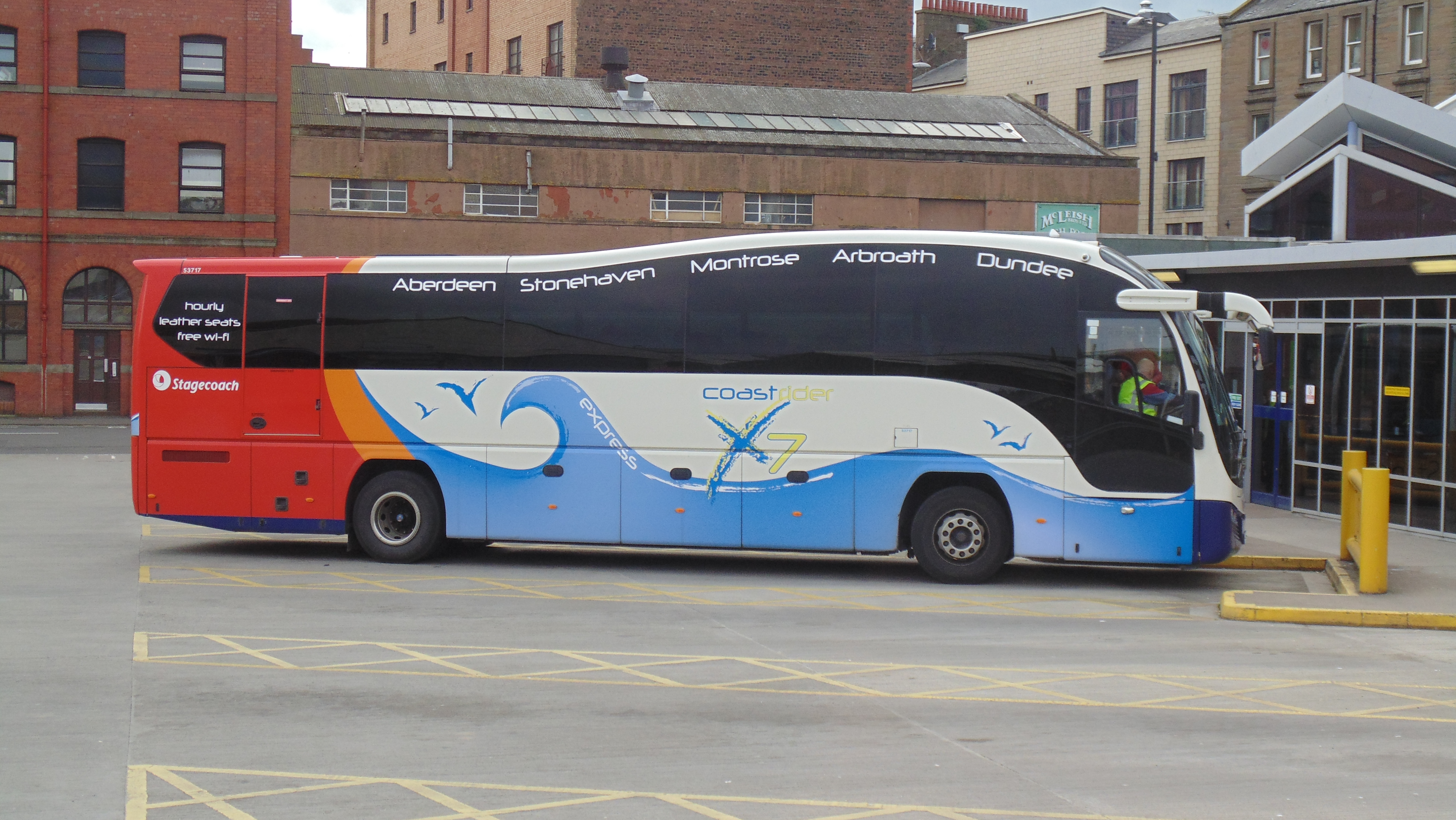
- An X7 bus, prior to the introduction of new coaches and extension of the route.

Overview
- Operator: Stagecoach South Scotland
- Began service: 12 September 2011 (14 years ago)

Route
- Start: Aberdeen bus station
- Via: Stonehaven, Montrose and Arbroath
- End: Dundee Seagate Bus Station

Service
- Frequency: Hourly (end-to-end) at busiest times, with some additional services between Aberdeen and Stonehaven operated by Stagecoach Bluebird.

The X7 Coastrider is an hourly bus route between the Scottish cities of Dundee and Aberdeen, via Arbroath and Montrose, operated by Stagecoach South Scotland. The service runs seven days a week.

== History ==
The route was introduced on 12 September 2011 and was initially operated by a fleet of six new Plaxton Elite bodied Volvo B9R coaches. In 2014, Stagecoach purchased eight new Volvo B11RT Plaxton Elite-i interdeck coaches for the route. These began service on 24 November. At this time, the southern terminus of the service was also extended from Dundee to Perth. The extension replaced route number 333, which operated between Perth Royal Infirmary and Dundee's Ninewells Hospital. A ninth coach was subsequently acquired for the route. In 2020, additional services numbered X7 were introduced between Aberdeen and Stonehaven, some of which continue through Stonehaven, providing an additional town service.

In April 2024, it was announced services X7 and 16/B will no longer operate between Dundee and Perth. On 13 May 2024, these changes took place. An extended service 39 and new services 39A/39B replaced them. Just one year later, in March 2025, the 39, 39A and 39B were axed and replaced by the reintroduced 16/B.

=== Tayway Services ===
Around late 2024 and early 2025, the timetable for Tayway bus services was updated.

Previously the 73 route had done the Ninewells to Arbroath bus service, however the new revisions saw that service 72 would offer an alternative from Ninewells to Arbroath, sticking mainly to the A92 after leaving Dundee, however this was slower than the X7. Despite the slightly lengthened journey time compared to the X7, the fact that the bus would usually be a low floored bus instead of a coach makes it a more desirable service for disabled passengers, especially those in wheelchairs.

Service 73/A/B (and service 73C during the evening) also provided journeys to Arbroath, however the fact that it would stop by dozens of suburbs and towns stretched the journey out and made it undesirable against the more efficient X7.

== Route ==
From the south, the route begins at Dundee Bus Station, before travlling along the A92 to Arbroath. From there, the bus continues along the A92, through Marywell, and then to Inverkeilor, and then through the town of Montrose, connecting with the Montrose Railway Station. The bus heads north, through St Cyrus, bypassing Johnshaven and Gourdon, and then through Inverbervie. The route continues north through Kinneff and then into Stonehaven town centre. The bus continues northwards, stopping only on a few stops along the A92 to serve Newtonhill, Portlethen and Hillside. The route then enters into Aberdeen, crossing the King George IV Bridge and ending at Aberdeen Bus Station.

== Criticism ==
The introduction of new coaches has been criticised by passengers who claim that they have insufficient space for wheelchair users, and that the steep stairs are hard to climb. The service is used by patients at Perth Royal Infirmary and Ninewells Hospital in Dundee. In response, Stagecoach stated that the vehicles meet Disability Discrimination Act standards and all had a space for a wheelchair user. The company stated in 2018 that the coaches were necessary to meet demand for the X7 service and that low-floor vehicles would have insufficient capacity.

Despite this, in September 2017, the company introduced a service numbered X8 to increase the frequency of service between Perth and Arbroath and "providing an alternative option for customers who may struggle with the stairs on the X7". The X8 route was withdrawn in 2018.

== See also ==
- Public transport in Perth and Kinross
