= Jet 727 =

Airport bus service in Aberdeen, Scotland

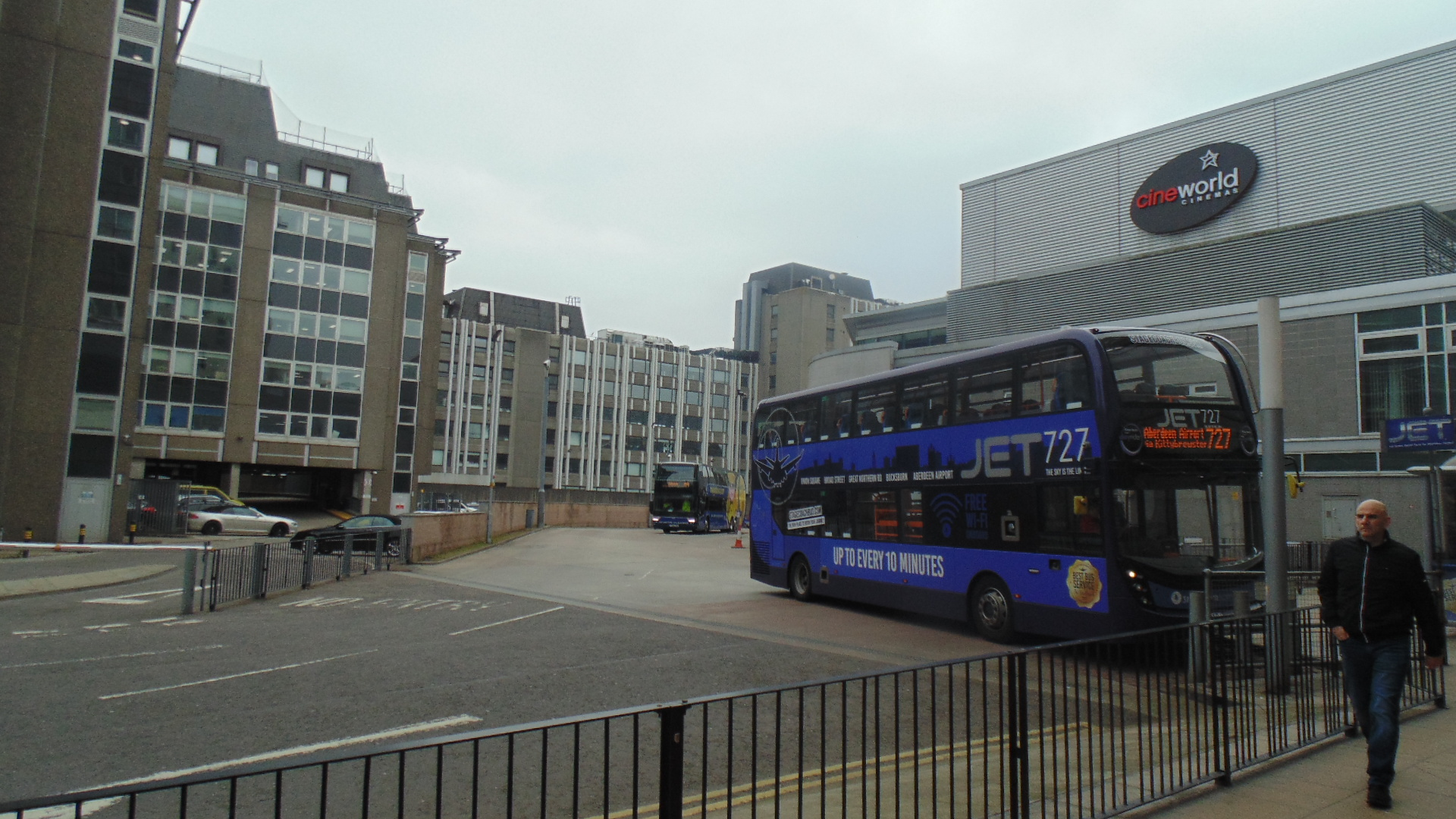
- A 727 service at Aberdeen bus station

Overview
- Operator: Stagecoach Bluebird
- Began service: August 2010

Route
- Start: Aberdeen bus station
- Via: P&J Live
- End: Aberdeen Airport

Service
- Frequency: Up to every 15 minutes

The Jet 727 is an airport bus service between Aberdeen bus station and Aberdeen Airport via the P&J Live operated by Stagecoach Bluebird.

== History ==
The route was introduced by Stagecoach Bluebird in partnership with Aberdeen City Council in August 2010. On 6 May 2016, a newly purchased fleet of Alexander Dennis Enviro400 double-decker buses began operating the route. Previously, the route was operated by single-decker Optare Versas.

On 30 January 2017, the route was adjusted to serve the newly opened Craibstone Park and Ride facility. However, in May 2017 the change was reverted due to passenger feedback.

On 8 July 2019, 24-hour service was introduced, with an hourly service in the late evening and early morning. The service is the first in Aberdeen to operate 24 hours per day.

In February 2021, the vehicles used on the service were rebranded to reflect the role of the service in transporting people to and from the P&J live, which was being used as a vaccination centre during the COVID-19 pandemic. The slogan "from station to vaccination" was added.

In September 2021, Stagecoach announced that the route would soon be operated using electric buses. When these were introduced, the route had lost its JET branding, with the new buses being a mix of the local and electric liveries.

== Route ==
Following its departure from Aberdeen bus station, the service heads via Market Street, Union Street, and the Gallowgate, where it passes the North East Scotland College campus. At the end of the Gallowgate, the service continues on the A96 through Kittybrewster, Woodside, and Bucksburn. It then leaves the A96 and heads for the airport, via the P&J Live.

As of 2022, the route operates with a maximum frequency of a bus every 15 minutes. It has previously operated with a maximum frequency of up to a bus every 10 minutes.

== See also ==
- 747 Aberdeen Airport–Peterhead
