= Gary Riddell =

Scottish footballer

Personal information
- Date of birth: 9 August 1966
- Place of birth: Ellon, Scotland
- Date of death: 11 June 1989 (aged 22)
- Place of death: Dunfermline, Scotland
- Position: Central defender

Senior career*
Years	Team	Apps	(Gls)
1983–1987	Aberdeen	0	(0)
1987–1989	Dunfermline Athletic	44	(0)
Total		44	(0)
- * Club domestic league appearances and goals

Gary Riddell (9 August 1966 – 11 June 1989) was a Scottish professional footballer who played as a central defender.

== Career ==
Born in Ellon, Riddell played for Aberdeen and Dunfermline Athletic.

He died while on a charity half-marathon raising money for the Hillsborough disaster.
