= 747 Aberdeen Airport–Peterhead =

747

Overview
- Operator: Stagecoach Bluebird
- Status: Withdrawn
- Ended service: April 2021

Route
- Start: Peterhead
- Via: Ellon, Balmedie
- End: Aberdeen Airport

The 747 was an airport bus service which ran from Peterhead to Aberdeen Airport via Ellon.

== History ==
The route was extended south starting on 21 January 2019 to also serve Montrose and Stonehaven, replacing the existing 107 service that operated between the two towns. The extension was added along with a new service, the 757, following public timetable consultations in September 2018. The routes were the first to use the newly opened Aberdeen Western Peripheral Route. The new services operated on an hourly frequency and used Alexander Dennis Enviro200 single-decker buses.

Passenger levels on services 747 and 757 were lower than expected. In August 2019, Stagecoach announced that it would withdraw service 757 completely and revise the route of the 747 to serve Balmedie.

In April 2020, following continued low passenger numbers, the 747 service between Montrose and Aberdeen Airport was withdrawn. The 107 between Montrose and Stonehaven was reinstated, and the southern terminus of the 747 reverted to Aberdeen Airport. In April 2021, the service was suspended. This was part of wider service cuts caused by a reduction in subsidies from Aberdeenshire Council. In September 2021, the council announced that the majority of cut services were to be reinstated in October; however, the 747 service would not be reinstated due to low usage.

== Name ==
The 747 and Jet 727 were named after the Boeing 7x7 series of aircraft.

== Route ==
The route formerly ran from Montrose to Stonehaven along the A92 before joining the A90 north of Stonehaven and continuing north to Kingswells Park and Ride and Aberdeen Airport. It then continued to Ellon, with some journeys continuing to Cruden Bay and Peterhead. Prior to withdrawal, the service only operated between Aberdeen Airport and Peterhead.
