= Aberdeen bus station =

Bus station in Aberdeen, Scotland

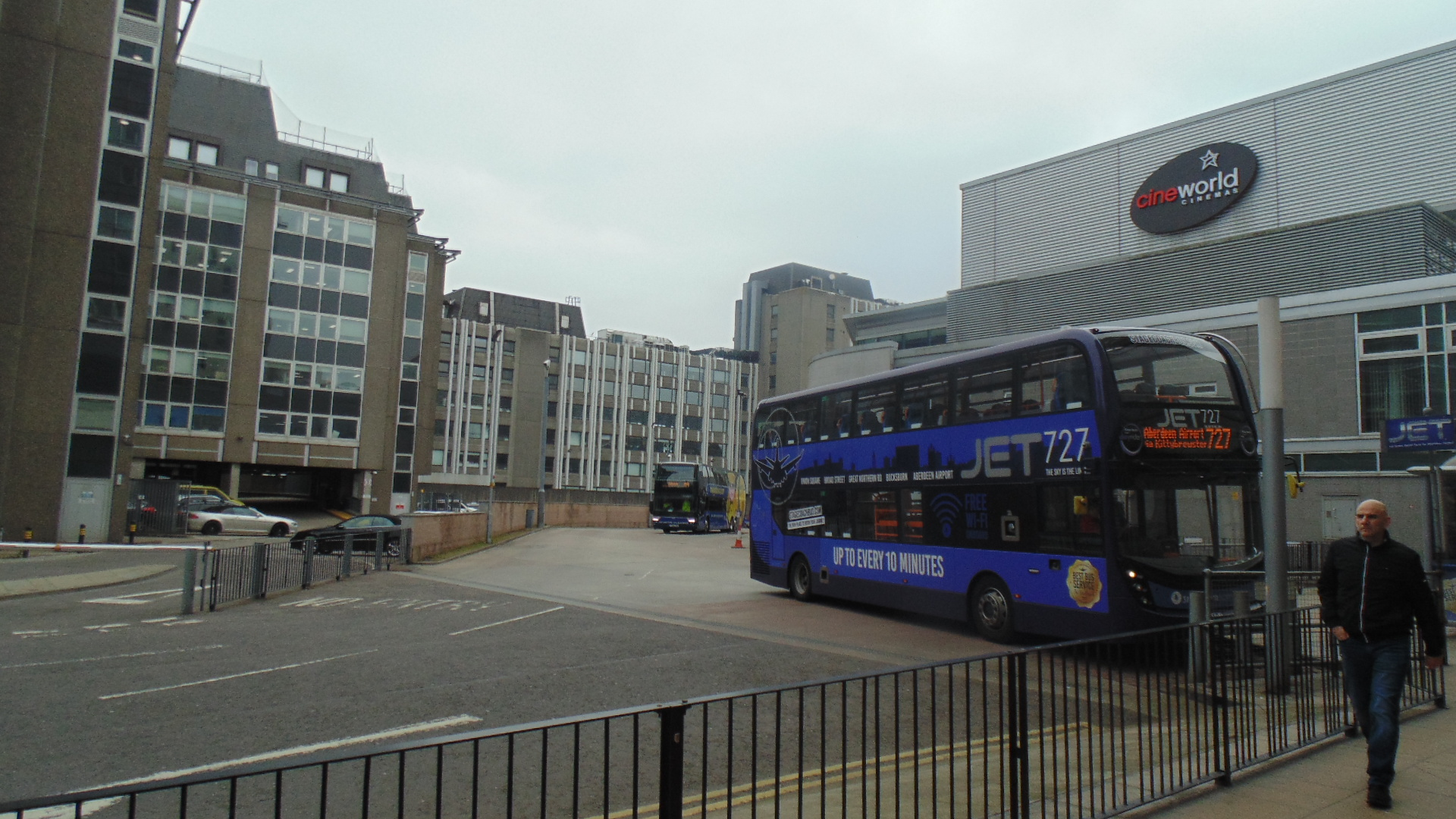

General information
- Location: Aberdeen, Scotland; Aberdeen City Council
- Bus operators: FlixBus; Scottish Citylink; Stagecoach Bluebird
- Connections: Aberdeen railway station

History
- Opened: 15 April 1963
Location

Aberdeen bus station is a bus station in Aberdeen, Scotland. It is operated by Stagecoach Group.

== History ==
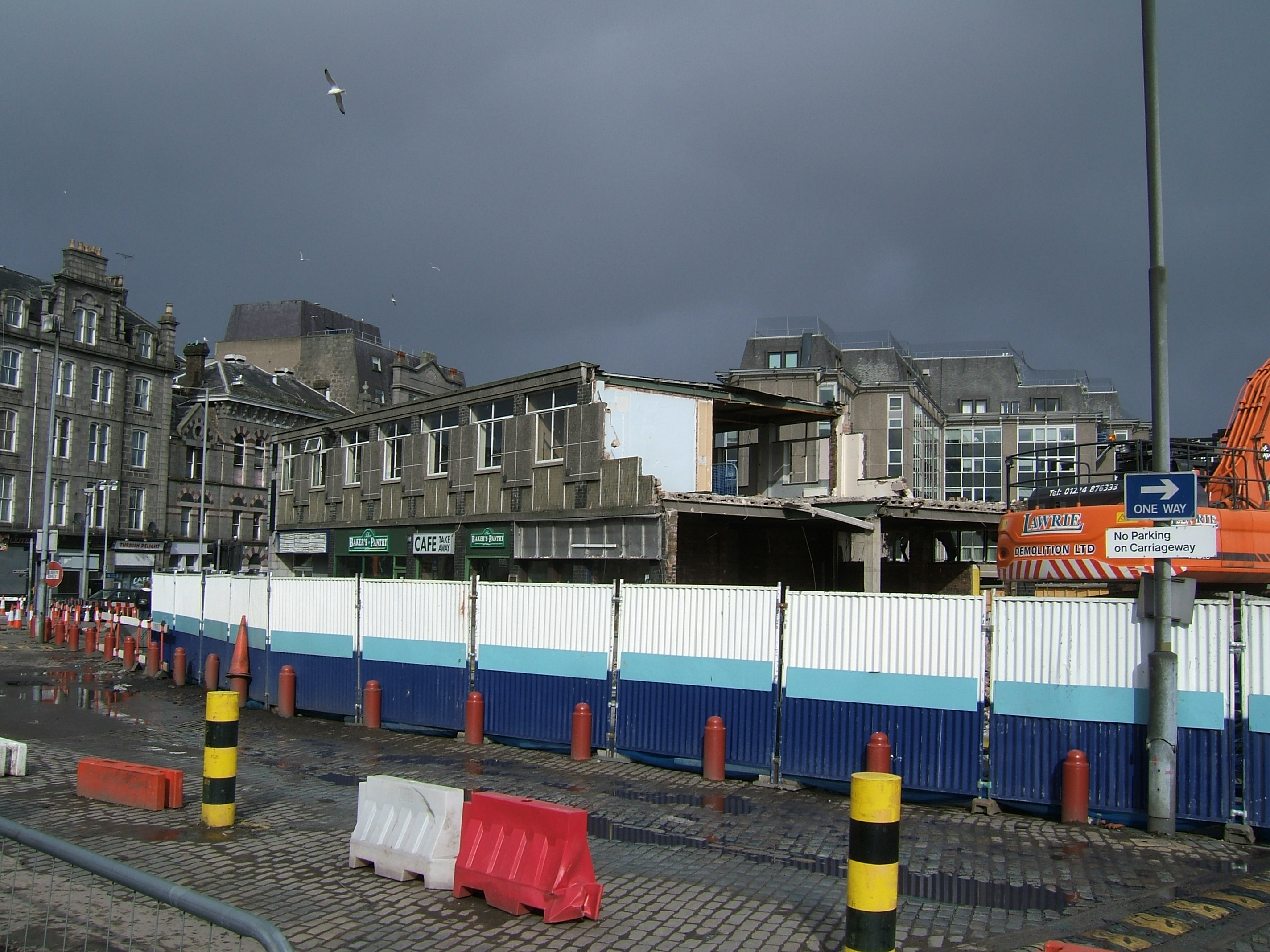
Demolition of the old bus station in March 2008

A single central bus station in Aberdeen was first considered in the 1950s, with a site in Upper Denburn selected by W. Alexander & Sons. At the time, there were several bus stations in use in Aberdeen. However, in March 1960, the company announced that it did not intend to develop the Upper Denburn site and had instead selected a site on the grounds of the Joint Railway Station (now Aberdeen railway station).

The new bus station opened on 15 April 1963.

Redevelopment of the bus station was included in the Union Square project which saw former railway land replaced with retail. The first phase of this project saw the existing bus station demolished and rebuilt, and was completed in February 2008.

== Layout ==
The station has two vehicular entrances, on Guild Street and Market Street. The station is connected to Union Square which itself is connected to the railway station, creating a covered interchange. The station also houses offices for Stagecoach (formerly Bluebird Buses).

== Services ==
The station is the terminus for services to surrounding towns and villages, including the X7 Coastrider to Perth via Dundee, and the Buchan Express services north to Peterhead and Fraserburgh. The Jet 727 service to Aberdeen Airport also starts here. Many internal Aberdeen services call at the adjacent Guild Street but do not enter the bus station itself.
