= Haudagain roundabout =

Roundabout in Aberdeen, Scotland

Coordinates: 57.1730°N 2.1451°W

The Haudagain roundabout /ˈhædəɡən/ is a roundabout in Aberdeen that bisects the A92 and A96.

As all traffic going northbound to Inverness via the A96 or southbound to Dundee via the A92 must pass through this roundabout, it is a busy junction with large queues approaching all directions to the roundabout, especially during rush hour. It has been referred to as 'Scotland's worst roundabout'.

The construction of Aberdeen Western Peripheral Route is aimed at reducing the congestion due to traffic passing through Aberdeen. In addition improvements are planned to help ease the congestion at the roundabout.

== Bypass ==
Following an evaluation of various options for improving traffic flow at the roundabout, a bypass to the south-west of the roundabout, linking the A92 and the A96, was selected. In 2008, this was expected to cost £14.5 million. The project required 127 flats to be demolished, this occurred in 2018. In December 2019, the construction company Farrans was appointed as contractor for the project. In January 2020, the project cost was quoted as £49.5 million, up from £17.6 million in December 2018.

The project was originally expected to be completed by spring 2021; however, this was pushed back to winter 2021. The road was officially opened on 16 May 2022 by Jenny Gilruth, who was then Scotland's minister for transport. It was named Brian Adam Road in honour of Brian Adam, the MSP for the Aberdeen Donside constituency which covers the area until his death in 2013.
