= Buchan Express =

Series of bus routes in Scotland

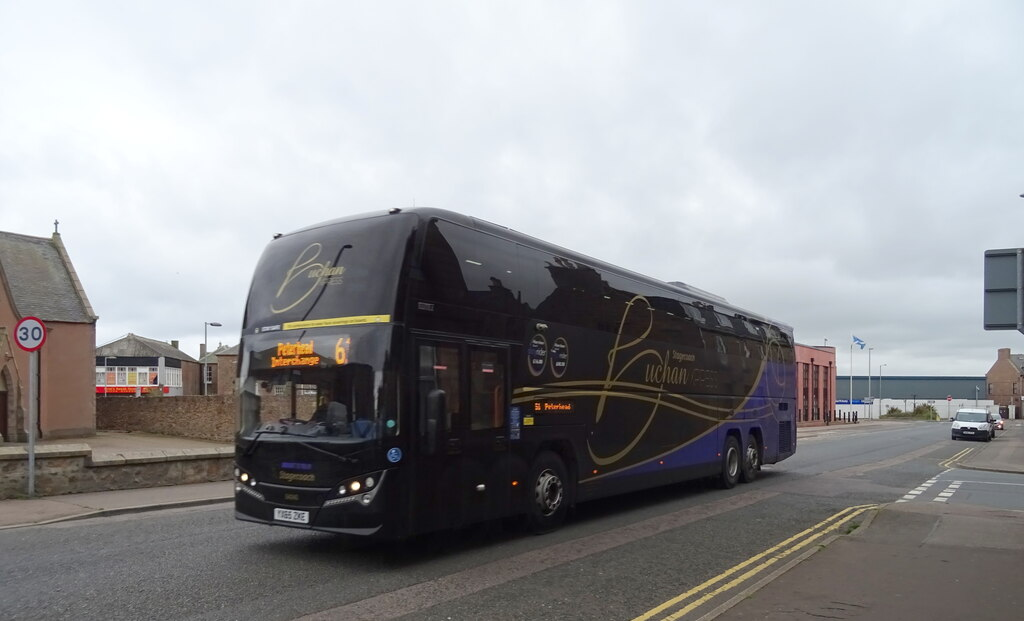
- Stagecoach Bluebird Plaxton Elite bodied Volvo B11RT on route 61 in Peterhead in August 2020

Overview
- Operator: Stagecoach Bluebird

The Buchan Express is a series of bus routes starting in Aberdeen. It is operated by Stagecoach Bluebird.

== History ==
The Buchan Express brand was introduced in 2015, coinciding with the introduction of 17 new Plaxton Elite-i vehicles. The routes previously operated under the Buchan Link brand. At this time, the routes were carrying around 25,000 people per week.

== Criticism ==
The new coaches were criticised for multiple accessibility problems, despite meeting disability regulations. As a result, in 2017 the steps within the coaches were modified and additional bell pushes were added.

== Routes ==
Number	Start	End	Via	Ref.
X60	Aberdeen bus station	Peterhead	Balmedie (Sunday Only), Ellon, Hatton	
61	Bus station	Peterhead	Balmedie, (Most Services), Newburgh (Most Services), Ellon, Hatton	
X63	Bus station	Peterhead	Balmedie, Newburgh, Cruden Bay	
X65	Bus station	Ellon	Balmedie, Foveran	
X67	Bus station	Fraserburgh	Ellon, Clola, Mintlaw, New Leeds	
(X)68	Bus station	Fraserburgh	Ellon, Clola, Mintlaw, Fetterangus, Strichen, Memsie	
