= Aberdeen Airport =

International airport in Aberdeen, Scotland

Aberdeen International Airport

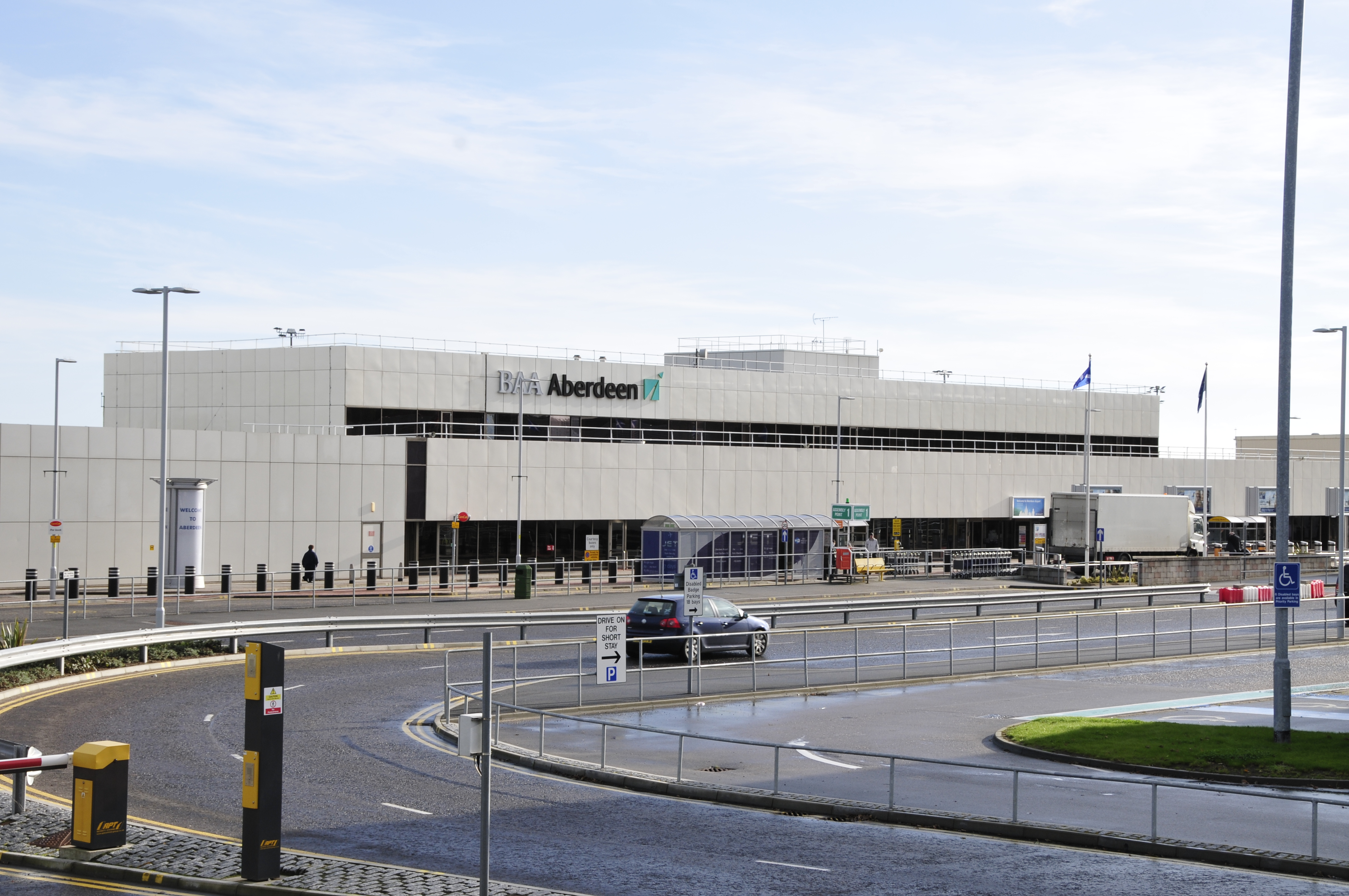
- IATA: ABZ; ICAO: EGPD

Summary
- Airport type: Public
- Owner: AGS Airports
- Operator: Aberdeen International Airport Ltd.
- Serves: Aberdeen
- Location: Dyce, Scotland
- Opened: 28 July 1934
- Hub for: Loganair
- Elevation AMSL: 215 ft (66 m)
- Coordinates: 57°12′09″N 002°11′53″W
- Website: www.aberdeenairport.com

Map
- Location of airport in Aberdeen

Runways
Direction	Length		Surface
Direction	m	ft	Surface
16/34	1,953	6,407	Asphalt

Helipads
Number	Length		Surface
Number	m	ft	Surface
H05/H23	476	1,562	Asphalt
H14/H32	581	1,906	Asphalt
H36	260	853	Asphalt

Statistics (2025)
- Passengers: 2,301,978
- Passenger change 2024-25: ▲0.1%
- Aircraft movements: 65,611
- Movements change 2024-25: ▼9.0%
- Sources: UK AIP at NATS; Statistics: UK Civil Aviation Authority

Aberdeen International Airport (IATA: ABZ, ICAO: EGPD) is an international airport, located in the Dyce suburb of Aberdeen, Scotland, approximately 6 miles (10 km) northwest of Aberdeen city centre. As of 2025, 2.3 million people used the airport.

The airport is owned and operated by AGS Airports, which also owns and operates Glasgow and Southampton airports. It was previously owned and operated by Heathrow Airport Holdings (formerly known as BAA). Aberdeen Airport is a base for Loganair. The airport also serves as the main heliport for the offshore North Sea oil and gas industry. With the utilisation of newer aircraft, helicopters can reach northernmost platforms on both the east and west of Shetland.

The airport has a main passenger terminal, serving all scheduled and charter holiday flights. In addition, there are four terminals dedicated to North Sea helicopter operations, used by Bristow Helicopters, CHC Helicopter, NHV and Babcock Mission Critical Services Offshore. There is also an additional small terminal adjacent to the main passenger terminal, used only for specific oil company charter flights to Sumburgh in Shetland.

== History ==
=== Early years ===
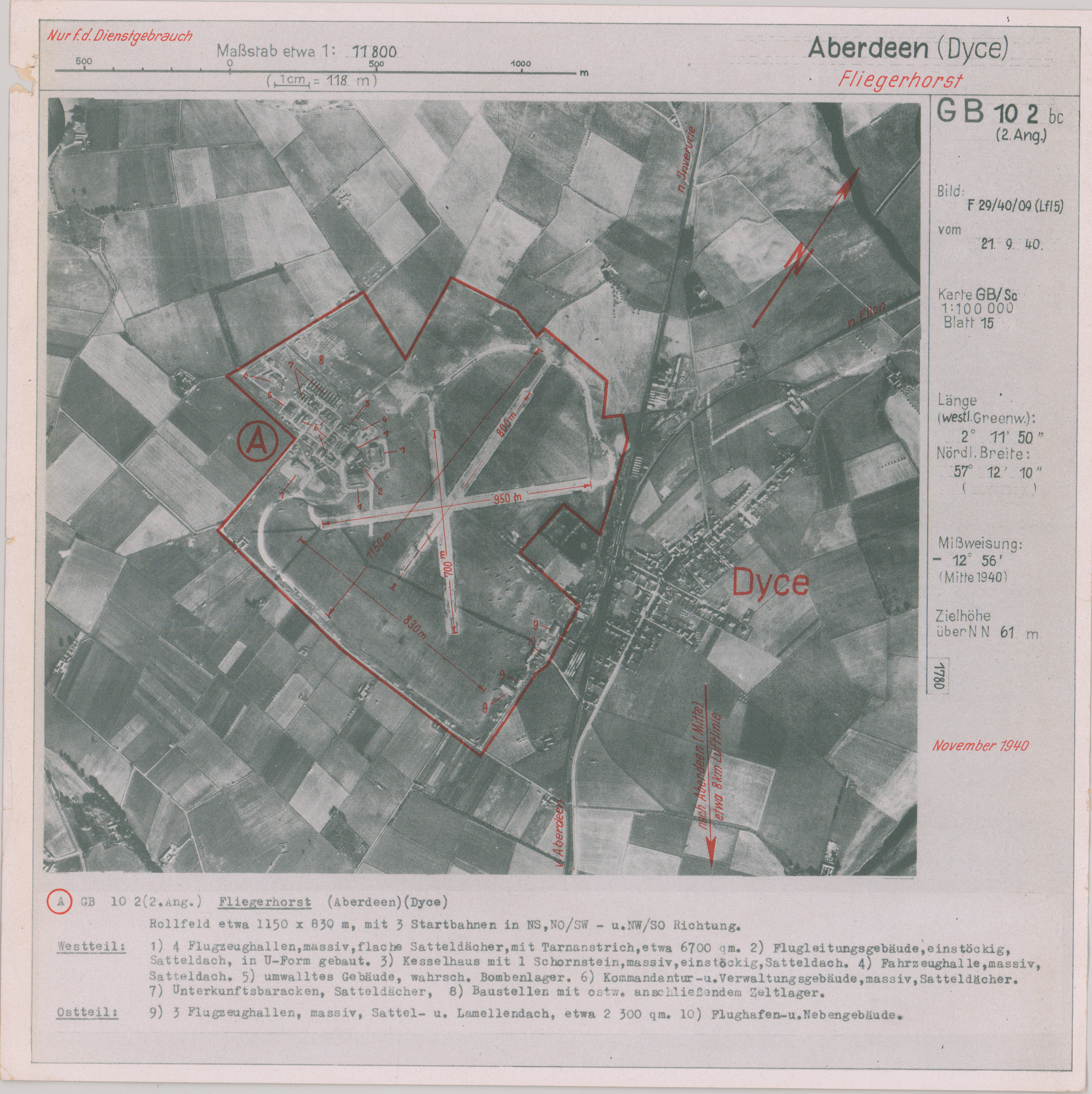
Target dossier of the airport, German Luftwaffe, 1940

The airport opened on 28 July 1934 as Dyce Aerodrome. It was established by Eric Gandar Dower for his enterprises including Aberdeen Flying School, Aberdeen Flying Club, and his airline, Aberdeen Airways.

During the Second World War, the airfield became a Royal Air Force station known as Royal Air Force Dyce, or more commonly RAF Dyce. It was the site of the Dyce Sector Operations Room within No. 13 Group. Although fighter aircraft were based at Dyce throughout the Battle of Britain to provide protection from German bombing raids launched from Occupied Norway, it was mainly used as a photographic reconnaissance station. Anti-shipping operations by RAF Coastal Command were carried out from RAF Dyce as well as convoy escort. The airfield was bombed by the Luftwaffe on 26 July 1940 and 27 August 1940, however no damage was reported. A decoy site ('Q' Site) was located at Harestone Moss near Whitecairns. The aim of this site was to create the impression of an active airfield during the night. The decoy worked on around four occasions, where several raids resulted in bombs being dropped on the decoy site. The decoy site had a small underground bunker that housed a generator. This was used to power a decoy 'flarepath' in addition to a rotating lamp to give the impression of a taxiing aircraft. Near the airport off the A96 road, to deter German gliders landing to attack RAF Dyce, the flat areas across from Concraig Farm (between Blackburn and Kintore) had wooden poles erected as anti-glider landing poles. A Supermarine Spitfire IIa crashed at the east side of the airfield on 19 November 1941 during attack practice with a target glider being towed. Flying Officer Zaoral is buried in the old Dyce graveyard. Also buried in the graveyard is a German aircrew who crashed in Aberdeen in 1940.

In May 1943, a German Junkers Ju 88 night-fighter landed at Dyce; it was flown to Scotland by its crew, who wanted to defect to the Allies. The surrender of this aircraft was of great intelligence value at the time, as it was fitted with the latest FuG 202 Liechtenstein BC A.I radar. The aircraft survives and is displayed in the Royal Air Force Museum in London.

On 17 August 1943, a de Havilland Mosquito crashed following a stall in the circuit, crashing onto 5 John Street in Dyce village; another Mosquito crashed on 10 April 1944 whilst on approach to the airfield. On 26 December 1944, a Messerschmitt Bf 109G signalling intentions to surrender, crash landed at the airfield. On 16 May 1945, two pilots were killed when a Vickers Wellington bomber crashed on landing, wrecking a goods train in Dyce railway station. During air-raids in the Second World War, aircraft were moved to East Fingask beside Oldmeldrum. One RAF building still remains at East Fingask, where aircrews waited for the "All Clear" before returning to Dyce airfield.

The following units have been based at Aberdeen Airport:

- No. 1 Coastal Patrol Flight RAF
- No. 2 Radio Servicing Section RAF
- No. 4 Fighter Command Servicing Unit RAF
- No. 5 Gliding School RAF
- No. 8 (Coastal) Operational Training Unit RAF
- No. 9 Blind Approach Training Flight RAF
- Detachment of No. 662 Gliding School RAF
- No. 663 Gliding School RAF (1970 - June 1973)
- No. 1509 (Beam Approach Training) Flight RAF
- No. 2737 Squadron RAF Regiment
- No. 2784 Squadron RAF Regiment
- Aberdeen University Air Squadron
- 2368 (Aberdeen Airport) Squadron Air Training Corps
- No. 612 (County of Aberdeen) Squadron RAuxAF

=== Post-RAF use ===
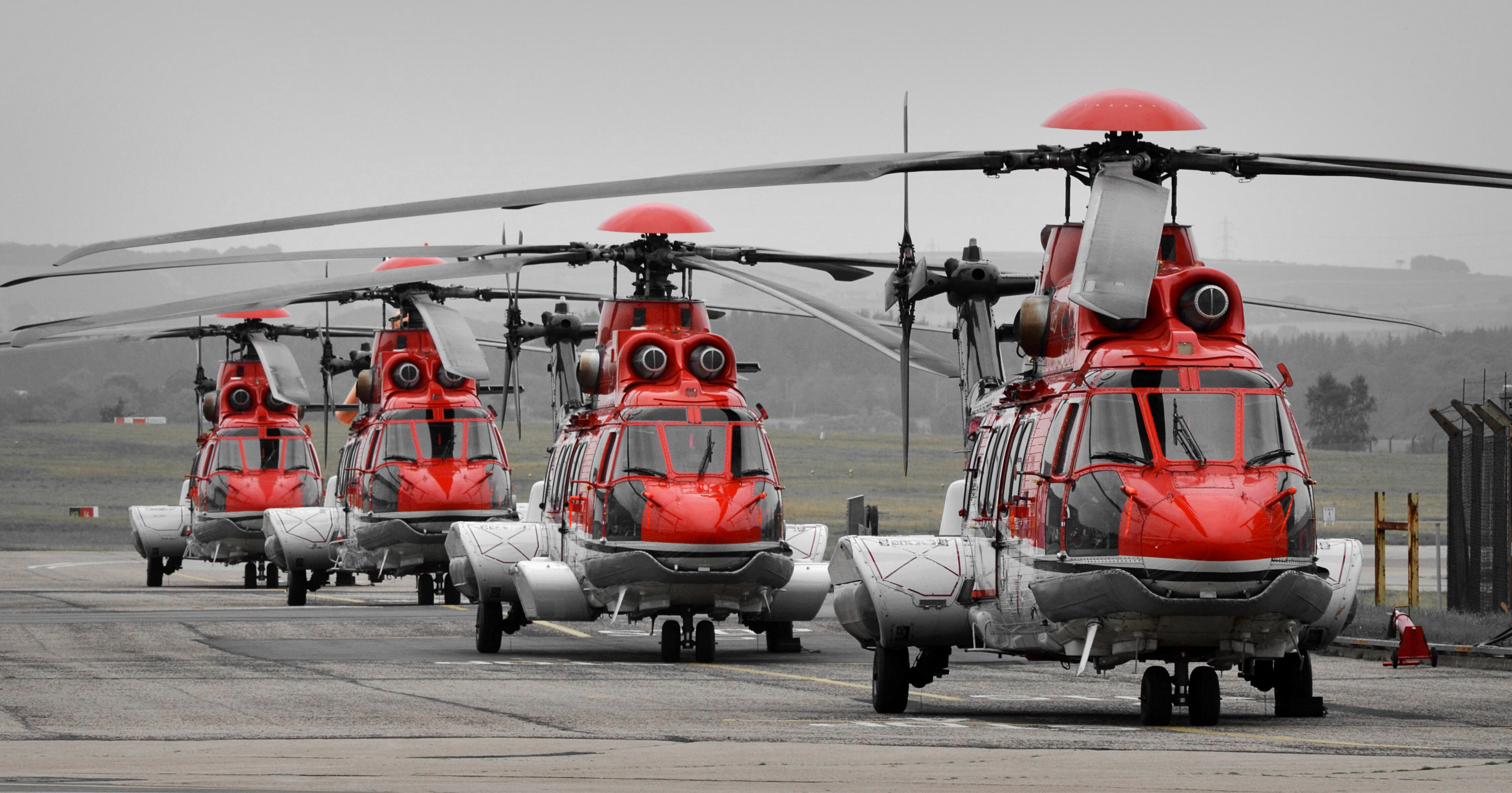
The airport is the world's busiest heliport. Here four helicopters are lined up in the morning waiting to begin the day's operations.

Virtually nothing remains from the war era at the airport due to expansion and development of the industrial estates around it. The original airport terminal was located at the east side where the Bond Offshore Helicopters Terminal 2 is located, a new terminal was built along with a new control tower to handle the increase in air traffic. The airport was nationalised in 1947 and was transferred to the control of the British Airports Authority (BAA) in 1975. From 1967 and 1970 there were regular flights to Moscow and Toronto; these were later stopped due to cost related problems.

With the discovery of North Sea oil, helicopter operations began in 1967, linking the growing number of oil platforms to the mainland. As Aberdeen became the largest oil-related centre in Europe, the airport became the world's largest commercial heliport. Today, Aberdeen Airport handles more than 37,000 rotary wing movements carrying around 468,000 passengers annually. Helicopters account for almost half of all aircraft movements at the airport.

=== Development since the 2000s ===
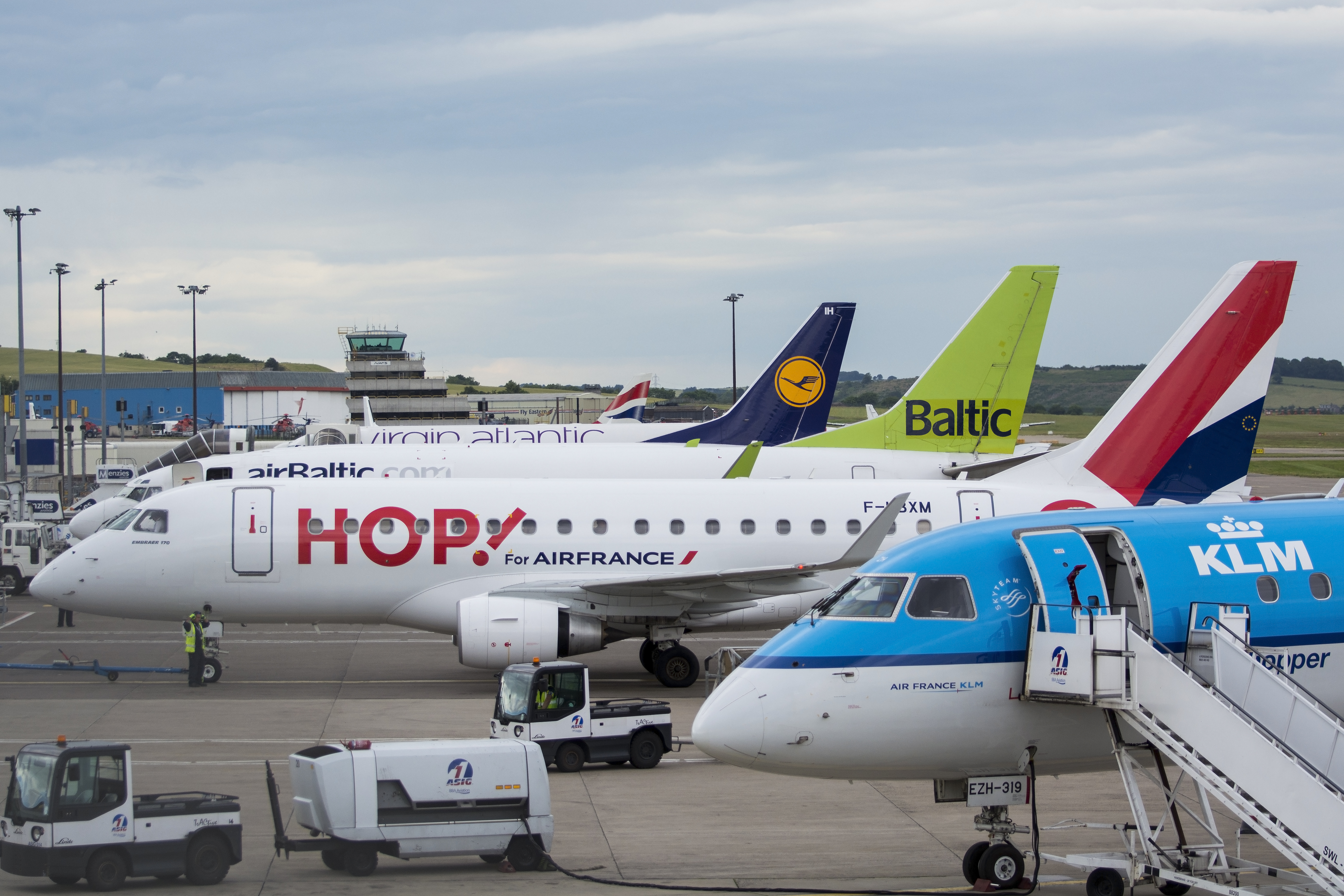
Various aircraft at Aberdeen International Airport in 2014

Until March 2005, aircraft were not allowed to take-off or land between 22:30 and 06:00 local time due to noise constraints. The city council overturned this curfew, however, despite some Dyce residents' objections, and the airport is now open 24 hours a day to fixed-wing aircraft with a quota count of QC4 or below, and the overnight restrictions still apply to helicopters.

General aviation flight training for private pilots licences takes place from the east side of the airport. Signature Flight Support also handles most of the private flights and corporate jets that park on the Eastside Apron. An air ambulance (fixed wing) is based on the eastside in a dedicated hangar, Gama Aviation operates the Super King-Air aircraft. There is an additional air ambulance Eurocopter EC145helicopter based at the airport for use during daylight hours to attend emergency incidents.

Aberdeen, being a major city in the oil industry has a number of oil company charter flights, these have included flights to South America and also Korea (via Abu Dhabi). Flights from the USA are regular visitors as well as the occasional military or VVIP flight.

In May 2011, Azerbaijan Airlines commenced service to Baku, another important city in the oil industry. The carrier flew an Airbus A319 on the route. Five months later, a 124-metre extension to the main runway at the airport was opened, almost eight months ahead of schedule. Azerbaijan Airlines discontinued its flight to Baku in October 2012. On 8 January 2013, the airport was renamed Aberdeen International Airport.

In October 2014, Heathrow Airport Holdings reached an agreement to sell the airport, together with Southampton and Glasgow, to AGS Airports for £1 billion. The airport handles around 500,000 passengers per year by helicopter for the North Sea oil fields. making it the world's busiest heliport.

A total of just under 3.1 million passengers used the airport in 2017, an increase of 4.6% compared with 2016. The airport's Master Plan 2013 forecast growth to 5.09 million passengers a year by 2040. A major three-year project (2016–2019) aims to transform the passenger terminal and increase space by 50%.

In 2019 the airport was ranked worst in Scotland and sixth worst in the UK by Which? magazine in a ranking of 30 airports for customer satisfaction, with a score of 50%. Edinburgh performed better on 61% while Glasgow International achieved the top rank in Scotland at 64%. In the 2023 edition of the survey Aberdeen was ranked second in Scotland with a score of 55%.

== Airlines and destinations ==
=== Passenger ===
The following airlines operate regular scheduled flights to and from Aberdeen:

Airlines	Destinations
Aer Lingus	Dublin
Air Charter Scotland	Wick
British Airways	London–Heathrow
EasyJet	Belfast–International (begins 4 January 2027), London–Gatwick, London–Luton, Paris–Charles de Gaulle; Seasonal: Barcelona (begins 31 March 2027), Geneva, Palma de Mallorca (begins 3 May 2027)
KLM	Amsterdam
Loganair	Belfast–City, Birmingham, Bristol, Dublin, Esbjerg, Kirkwall, Manchester, Norwich, Sumburgh
Ryanair	Alicante, Krakow; Seasonal: Faro, Málaga
Scandinavian Airlines	Seasonal: Copenhagen
TUI Airways	Seasonal: Corfu, Dalaman, Palma de Mallorca, Reus, Tenerife–South
Widerøe	Bergen, Stavanger
Wizz Air	Gdańsk

=== Cargo ===
Airlines	Destinations
West Atlantic	East Midlands

== Statistics ==
=== Annual traffic ===
Year	Passengers (Note: Number of passengers including domestic, international and transit.)	Aircraft movements (Note: Number of movements represents total takeoffs and landings during that year.)
2008	3,290,920	119,831
2009	2,984,445	109,876
2010	2,763,708	102,396
2011	3,082,816	108,862
2012	3,330,126	115,013
2013	3,440,765	118,219
2014	3,723,662	124,282
2015	3,469,525	112,357
2016	2,955,338	96,156
2017	3,090,642	97,007
2018	3,056,018	91,279
2019	2,912,883	91,248
2020	994,077	59,250
2021	1,075,639	62,986
2022	1,960,307	74,098
2023	2,229,918	73,442
2024	2,300,657	72,100
2025	2,301,978	65,611
Source: UK Civil Aviation Authority (2018 data)

=== Busiest routes ===
Busiest international routes from Aberdeen (2025)
Rank	Destination	Passengers	Change 2024–2025
1	Amsterdam	308,920	▲3%
2	Stavanger	75,755	▲1%
3	Dublin	75,382	▲6%
4	Gdańsk	67,399	▲23%
5	Bergen	47,698	▲18%
6	Alicante	36,588	▲16%
7	Málaga	32,319	▲50%
8	Faro	27,965	▲31%
9	Kraków	27,494	N/A
10	Palma de Mallorca	24,502	▲1%
Source: CAA Statistics

Busiest domestic routes from Aberdeen (2025)
Rank	Destination	Passengers	Change 2024–2025
1	London–Heathrow	555,033	▼3%
2	London–Gatwick	202,456	▲3%
3	Sumburgh	127,855	▲1%
4	London-Luton	62,803	▼11%
5	Manchester	53,233	▼14%
6	Birmingham	49,711	▼8%
7	Kirkwall	42,881	▲12%
8	Norwich	28,228	▼5%
9	Belfast–City	16,659	▼10%
10	Newquay	15,764	▲1%
Source: CAA Statistics

== Facilities ==
Aberdeen International Airport has one fixed-wing aircraft runway (16/34) which is 1,953 m (6,407 ft) long and surfaced with grooved asphalt. Three further runways: H14/H32 581 m (1,906 ft), H05/H23 476 m (1,562 ft) and H36 260 m (850 ft) are available for helicopter use only.

The main terminal has 19 stands adjacent to it. Remote parking is available on other aprons located around the airfield. Four offshore helicopter operators each have their own aprons and hangars, with Bristows and CHC-Scotia located on the western side of the airfield and NHV and Babcock on the eastern side.

Several hotels are situated adjacent to the airport, including Crowne Plaza, Holiday Inn Express, Courtyard by Marriott, Leonardo Inn, Moxy Hotel and Jurys Inn. Other nearby hotels include the Hallmark Hotel, Hampton by Hilton, Marriott, and Premier Inn.

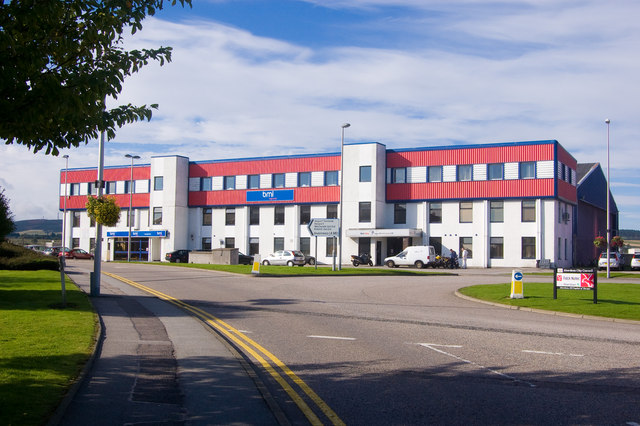
Former head office of BMI Regional

For flight training, Airbus/Eurocopter and Bristow Helicopters both have helicopter flight simulators in buildings at the airport. Alexander Air also operate GA flight training based from Aberdeen Airport.

== Accidents and incidents ==
- On 22 May 1978, a British Airways Hawker Siddeley Trident (G-AWZU) overshot the runway ending up 200 ft into the grass at the northern end of runway 35 (now 34) due to wet weather. All 120 passengers survived with no injuries, and the aircraft was quickly returned to service. It was retired in December 1985 and after scrapping the forward fuselage of this aircraft went to the Jet Age Museum, Gloucester.
- On 4 July 1983, Bristow Helicopters AS332L Super Puma (G-TIGD) crashed on landing at Aberdeen. During the approach from the North Hutton offshore platform, a loud bang was heard, followed by severe vibration. A distress call was made to air traffic control by the crew. Shortly before landing control was lost and the helicopter struck the runway heavily on its side. Ten of sixteen passengers received serious injuries. A tail boom panel had become detached in flight and damaged all five tail rotor blades. The resulting imbalance to the tail rotor assembly led to the separation of this unit and subsequent loss.
- On 31 March 1992, BAe 146-300 (G-UKHP) overran runway 34 after landing during wet conditions with a high crosswind. The pilot failed to deploy the spoilers and ran off the end of the runway. The aircraft sustained only minor damage and no passengers were injured.
- On 24 December 2002, a Swearingen Metroliner III (OY-BPH) of Danish operator North Flying crashed after takeoff from Aberdeen on a positioning flight to Aalborg in Denmark. Immediately after take-off the aircraft was suspected to have suffered a major power loss in its right engine and crashed into a field just to the south of the airport. It slid along the field and through a fence onto Dyce Drive, a main road into the airport, where it hit a moving car and then came to rest. The two crew and driver of the car survived the accident, with only one crew member sustaining minor injuries.
- On 22 June 2006, a City Star Airlines Dornier 328 (TF-CSB) operating a passenger flight from Stavanger, Norway, overshot the end of the airport's runway by several hundred yards as it came in to land. None of the 16 passengers and 3 crew members on board were injured.
- On 16 June 2020, a former Flybe Bombardier Q400 (G-JECK) made a low speed rear end ground collision with a stationary Loganair Embraer ERJ-145EP (G-SAJS), the former becoming wedged under the latter. There were no passengers on either plane and no injuries.

== Ground transport ==
=== Rail ===
The Aberdeen–Inverness railway line and Dyce railway station are located alongside the eastern boundary of the airport. Between 2012 and 2017 a shuttle bus (No. 80 Dyce Airlink) provided transport between the station and the terminal. The service ceased operation due to low passenger numbers, attributed by the operator to lower activity in the North Sea oil and gas industry.

=== Bus ===
Aberdeen Airport is served by Stagecoach Bluebird's dedicated 24/7 Jet 727 bus service up to every 15 minutes to the main bus and rail station in Aberdeen, as well as occasional journeys to and from Dyce Railway Station, Portlethen and Stonehaven. 747 Aberdeen Airport–Peterhead formerly linked the airport with Balmedie, Ellon, and Peterhead. In 2025, Stagecoach introduced a 737 service, which linked the airport with Dyce railway station and Blackburn. This route was cancelled in May 2026.

Ember operate services E7 & E11 via the Airport (prebooked), linking the Airport to places such as Inverness, Dundee & Braemar.

=== Road ===
The airport lies on the main A96 Aberdeen to Inverness road, being only a few kilometres from the city centre itself.

The airport is connected to the Aberdeen Western Peripheral Route at the Craibstone exit which is around 1 mile drive away from the Main terminal.

== Future ==
A range of proposals to better connect Dyce railway station to the main passenger terminal have been suggested over the years. A rail link between the two was ruled-out in 2019 as being too expensive, with an estimated cost in excess of £100 million. Options such as walking long distance travelators or covered walkways, bus services or fixed trams as well as the possibility of a railway station at nearby entertainment venue P&J Live are still being considered.
