= Ellon, Aberdeenshire =

Town in northern Scotland

Coordinates: 57.366°N 02.086°W

Ellon: Scottish Gaelic: Eilean
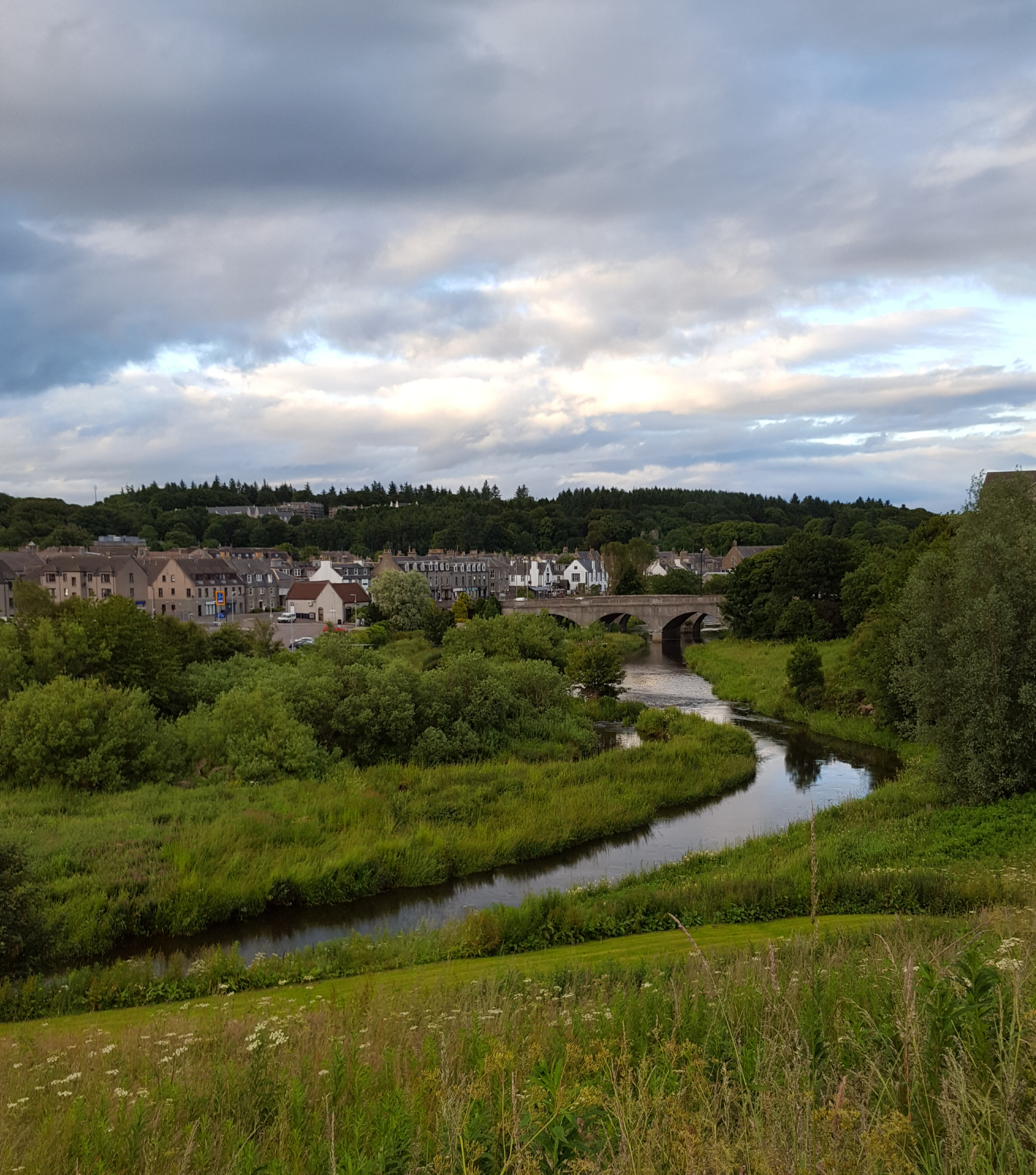
- Ellon Town Centre and the River Ythan

- Location within Aberdeenshire
- Population: 10,126 (2022)
- OS grid reference: NJ948306
  - Edinburgh: 106 mi (171 km)
  - London: 412 mi (663 km)
- Council area: Aberdeenshire
- Lieutenancy area: Aberdeenshire
- Country: Scotland
- Sovereign state: United Kingdom
- Post town: ELLON
- Postcode district: AB41
- Dialling code: 01358
- Police: Scotland
- Fire: Scottish
- Ambulance: Scottish
- UK Parliament: Gordon and Buchan
- Scottish Parliament: Aberdeenshire East

Ellon (derived from Scottish Gaelic: Eilean) is a town in Aberdeenshire, Scotland, approximately 16 miles (26 kilometres) north of Aberdeen, lying on the River Ythan, which has one of the few undeveloped river estuaries on the eastern coast of Scotland. It had a population of 10,126 in 2022.

It is in the ancient region of Formartine. Its name is believed to derive from the Gaelic term Eilean, meaning island, reflecting the town’s historical position at a ford on the River Ythan. In 1707 it was made a burgh of barony for the Earl of Buchan.

== Places of interest ==
Places of interest within the town include Ellon Castle Gardens, a historic garden complex restored by volunteers and open to the public. The gardens contain a collection of ancient English yew trees thought to be at least 500 years old, along with the ruins of the old Ellon Castle. Ellon also has Auld Brig, the Old Bridge of Ellon, a Category A listed bridge across the River Ythan, built in 1793 and no longer carrying vehicular traffic.

The Riverside Park offers walkways alongside the Ythan, from which herons, salmon, trout and otters may be observed.

In 2013, BrewDog built a 5 1/2-acre (2.2-hectare) brewery at a cost of £7.8 million in a greenfield site just outside of Ellon. The brewery is designed to minimise carbon emissions with the use of treatment plants, biogas technology and since 2021, an anerobic digestion plant. In 2016, the brewery was expanded at a cost of £5 million including the addition of a new 300-hectolitre (hL) brew house.

The ruins of the Kinmuck Castle are located about 4.0 miles (6.4 km) north-east of Ellon. That castle was dismantled in 1413 to build the old Ellon Castle.

== Education ==
The town has three primary schools:

- Ellon Primary School
- Auchterellon Primary School
- Meiklemill Primary School

These schools feed into Ellon Academy, the local secondary school. A new purpose-built Ellon Academy Community Campus opened to pupils in August 2015 on the outskirts of the town.

== Leisure ==
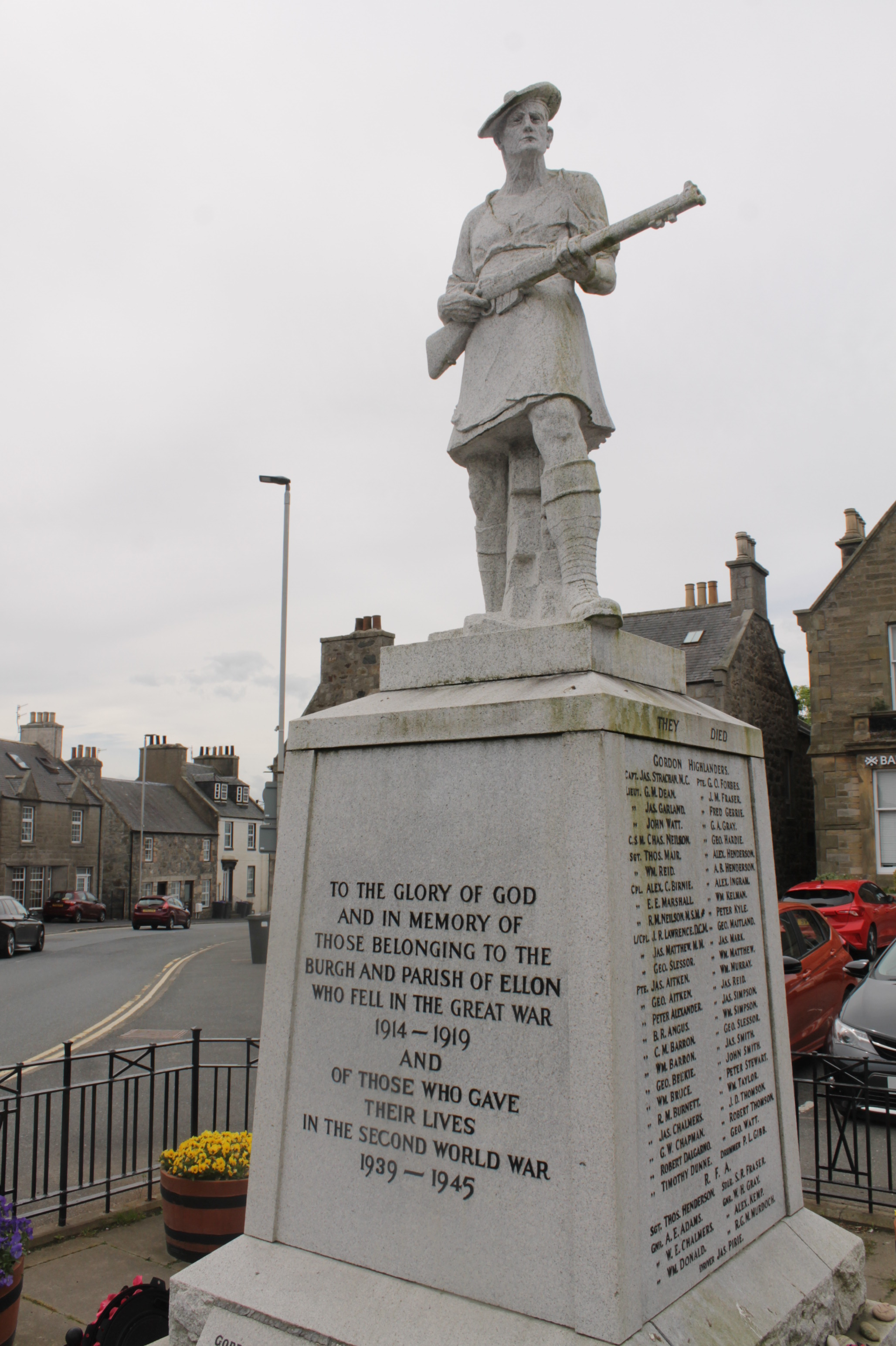
Ellon War Memorial

Ellon has a community centre at the Ellon Academy Community Campus, which includes a swimming pool.

The Ythan Centre was formerly used by Aberdeenshire Council’s community learning and development service and had been vacant since February 2016. In January 2019, Ellon Baptist Church began using the council-owned building under a five-year lease as a community and religious hub.

The Meadows sports centre, located on the outskirts of Ellon, has many sporting facilities and clubs, including football and rugby pitches, an astroturf pitch for hockey, a gym, and a multi-use sports hall. The Meadows is also home to Ellon United football team, the Ellon Rugby Club and Ellon Hockey Club.

== Media ==
The town has a local newspaper, the Ellon Times.

== Housing ==
Ellon has benefited from the North Sea oil demand, and is one of the main dormitory towns for Aberdeen. It is part of the proposed Energetica corridor of development.

== Transport ==
Ellon is bypassed by the A90 road, which offers convenient access to Aberdeen to the south and Peterhead and Fraserburgh to the north. Other major road links are the A920 west to Oldmeldrum and Huntly, and the A948 north to New Deer.

Regular and frequent bus services link Ellon with Aberdeen, Inverurie, Peterhead, Fraserburgh and surrounding towns and villages. Services operate from both the town centre and Ellon Park and Ride at the eastern edge of the town.

Ellon railway station opened in 1861 on the Formartine and Buchan Railway, later becoming part of the Great North of Scotland Railway. It became a junction station in 1897 with the opening of the Boddam Branch, but lost this status when the branch closed in 1932. Passenger services on the Buchan line were withdrawn in 1965 as part of the Beeching Axe.

The former railway line is now part of the Formartine and Buchan Way, a long-distance walking and cycling route that follows the track of the disused Formartine and Buchan Railway through Aberdeenshire.

Due to the population expansion since the North Sea Oil boom, the A90 has become overloaded between Aberdeen, Ellon and Peterhead. The Aberdeen Crossrail project has looked at reopening sections of the former railway, however as of March 2009 this is still unlikely.

== Twin town ==
Ellon is twinned with:

- Chièvres, Hainaut Province, Belgium.

== Notable people ==
- Patrick Gordon of Auchleuchries (1635–1699), general and rear admiral in Russia, chief advisor to Tsar Peter the Great
- James Gordon (British Army officer, died 1783), a British Army officer who fought in the American Revolutionary War
- Rev James Robertson (1803–1860) later Moderator of the General Assembly of the Church of Scotland and first person in Britain to use bone meal as a fertiliser (on the church glebe)
- Alexander Mitchell (1817–1887), U.S. Representative from Wisconsin
- Sir James Reid, 1st Baronet (1849–1923), Physician-in-ordinary to Queen Victoria
- Teddy Scott (1929–2012), footballer, coach for Aberdeen F.C.
- Tom Patey (1932–1970), mountaineer and doctor
- John MacLeod of MacLeod (1935-2007), 29th Chief of Clan MacLeod
- Patrick Wolrige-Gordon (1935–2002), Politician
- Iain Sutherland (1948–2019), musician of The Sutherland Brothers
- Paul Sturrock (b. 1956), footballer
- Evelyn Glennie (b. 1965), percussionist
- Gary Riddell (1966-1989), footballer
- Fiona Campbell (b. 1981), international cricketer
- Natalie Ross (b. 1989), footballer
