= Fraser (surname) =

- Pronunciation: /ˈfreɪ.zər/

Origin
- Languages: English, French, Gaelic, Scots
- Origin: France, Scotland
- Region of origin: Scotland

Other names
- Variant forms: Fraiser, Frasier, Frashier, Frazer, Frazier

Fraser is a Scottish surname, connected to the Clans Fraser and Fraser of Lovat. It is most commonly found in the United Kingdom, Canada, the United States, Australia, and New Zealand.

Notable people with the surname include:

== A ==
- Adam Fraser (1871–?), Scottish footballer
- Alasdair Fraser (born 1955), Scottish fiddler
- Alec Fraser (disambiguation)
- Alex Fraser (disambiguation)
- Alexander Fraser (disambiguation)
- Alistair Fraser (1885–1964), Canadian politician
- Alison Fraser (born 1955), American actress and singer
- Allan Fraser (disambiguation)
- Andrew Fraser (disambiguation)
- Andy Fraser (1952–2015), English musician and songwriter, member of the rock band Free
- Angus Fraser (born 1965), English international cricketer
- Antonia Fraser (born 1932), British author
- Archibald Campbell Fraser of Lovat (1736–1815), British consul
- Arvonne Fraser (1925–2018), American politician and writer

== B ==
- Barbara Wall Fraser (born 1947), American politician
- Barry Fraser (1940–2022), Canadian ice hockey executive
- Bernie Fraser (disambiguation)
- Bill Fraser (disambiguation)
- Bonnie Fraser, lead singer of Australian pop-punk band Stand Atlantic
- Brad Fraser (born 1959), Canadian playwright
- Brendan Fraser (born 1968), Canadian-American actor
- Brooke Fraser (born 1983), New Zealand singer-songwriter
- Bruce Fraser (disambiguation)

== C ==
- Carol Hoorn Fraser (1930–1991), American-born Canadian figurative artist
- Cecil Fraser (born c. 1892), Australian pianist and composer for radio
- Charles Fraser (disambiguation)
- C. Gerald Fraser (1925–2015), American journalist
- Chase Fraser (born 1995), Canadian lacrosse player
- Chelsea Curtis Fraser (1876–1954), Canadian-born American author and illustrator of nonfiction children's books
- Cherry-Ann Fraser, (born 1999), Guyanese and West Indies cricketer
- Chick Fraser (1873–1940), American Major League Baseball pitcher
- Christine Marion Fraser (1938–2002), Scottish author
- Christopher Fraser (born 1965), British Member of Parliament
- Christopher Finlay Fraser (1839–1894), Canadian lawyer and politician
- Christopher Neil Fraser (born 1974), British-born Australian businessman
- Colin Fraser (disambiguation)

== D ==
- Daniel Fraser (disambiguation)
- David Fraser (disambiguation)
- Dawn Fraser (born 1937), Australian swimmer
- Donald Fraser (disambiguation)
- Donna Fraser (born 1972), English track athlete
- Doug Fraser (disambiguation)
- Douglas Fraser (1916–2008), American union leader
- Douglas M. Fraser (born 1953), American general
- Drew Fraser (born 1944), Canadian academic
- Duncan Fraser (disambiguation)

== E ==
- Eadie Fraser (1860–1886), Scottish footballer
- Elisabeth Fraser (1920–2005), American actress
- Eliza Fraser (c. 1798–1858), Scottish shipwreck survivor
- Elizabeth Fraser (born 1963), Scottish singer
- Eric Fraser (disambiguation)
- Etty Fraser (1931–2018), Brazilian actress
- Evan Fraser of Balconie, 19th-century Scottish officer in the British Army, and landowner

== F ==
- Flora Fraser (disambiguation)
- Francis Fraser (disambiguation)
- Frankie Fraser (1923–2014), British gangster and ex-convict once dubbed 'the most dangerous man in Britain'
- Frank L. Fraser (1854–1935), American politician
- Franklin D. Fraser (1819–1879), Florida Supreme Court justice

== G ==
- George Fraser (disambiguation)
- Giles Fraser (born 1964), English Anglican priest and journalist
- Gord or Gordon Fraser (disambiguation)
- Graham Fraser (born 1946), Canadian journalist

== H ==
- Hadley Fraser (born 1980), English actor and singer
- Hamish Fraser (1913–1986), Scottish communist turned Catholic anti-communist journalist and activist
- Harold Fraser (disambiguation)
- Harry Fraser (disambiguation)
- Helen Fraser (disambiguation)
- Henk Fraser (born 1966), Dutch footballer
- Henry Fraser (disambiguation)
- Herbert MacKay-Fraser (1922–1957), American racing driver
- Hew Fraser (1877–1938), Scottish field hockey player
- Honor Fraser (born 1974), Scottish art dealer and fashion model
- Hugh Fraser (disambiguation)

== I ==
- Iain Fraser (disambiguation)
- Ian Fraser (disambiguation)
- Isaac Fraser (1779–1858), Canadian politician

== J ==
- Jack Fraser (disambiguation)
- James Fraser (disambiguation)
- Jill Fraser (1946–2006), British theatre owner and director
- Jim Fraser (disambiguation)
- J. Keith Fraser (born 1922), Canadian geographer
- Jo Fraser (born 1986), Scottish painter
- Joan Fraser (born 1944), Canadian senator
- John Fraser (disambiguation)
- Josh Fraser (born 1982), Australian rules footballer
- Julian Fraser (born 1950), British Virgin Islands politician
- Juliette May Fraser (1887–1983), American artist
- Julius Thomas Fraser (1923–2010), Hungarian-born American author and interdisciplinary scholar of time

== K ==
- Karen Fraser (born 1944), Washington State Senator
- Katharine Fraser, 22nd Lady Saltoun (born 1957), Scottish noble
- Kathleen Fraser (disambiguation)
- Keath Fraser (born 1944), Canadian author
- Keith Fraser (disambiguation)
- Kelly Fraser (1993–2019), Inuk-Canadian Inuktitut-language singer-songwriter
- Kerry Fraser (born 1952), Canadian ice hockey referee
- disappearance of Krystal Fraser – Unsolved 2009 disappearance of 23-year-old from Victoria
- Kristin Fraser (born 1980), American ice dancer

== L ==
- Laura Fraser (born 1976), Scottish actress
- Leo Fraser (1926–2013), American lawyer, businessman and politician
- Lindley M. Fraser (1904–1963), British economist
- Liz Fraser (1930–2018), English actress
- Louis Fraser (1810–1866), British zoologist
- Louis James Fraser (before 1870?–before 1917?), Scottish pioneer in Malaysia - see Fraser's Hill

== M ==
- Malcolm Fraser (disambiguation)
- Marcus Fraser (golfer) (born 1978), Australian golfer
- Marcus Fraser (footballer) (born 1994), Scottish footballer
- Margaret Marjory Fraser (1885–1918), Canadian military nurse
- Mark Fraser (disambiguation)
- Marion Fraser (1932–2016), Scottish music educator
- Martin Fraser (born 1970), Irish civil servant
- Mary Isabel Fraser (1863–1942), New Zealand teacher and advocate for girls' education
- Mat, Matt or Matthew Fraser (disambiguation)
- Maxwell Fraser, British musician, rapper, singer, songwriter and DJ Maxi Jazz
- Michael Fraser (basketball) (born 1984), Canadian basketball player
- Michael Fraser (footballer) (born 1983), Scottish football goalkeeper
- Michael Fraser, Baron Fraser of Kilmorack (1915–1996), British political administrator
- Moyra Fraser (1923–2009), British actress
- Murdo Fraser (born 1965), Scottish politician

== N ==
- Nancy Fraser (born 1947), American philosopher and political theorist
- Nathan Fraser (born 2005), Irish soccer player
- Neale Fraser (1933–2024), Australian tennis player
- Neil Fraser (disambiguation)
- Norman Fraser (1904–1986), Chilean-born English pianist and composer

== P ==
- Paul Fraser (born 1955), British entrepreneur
- Peter Fraser (disambiguation)
- Phyllis Fraser (1916–2006), American actress

== R ==
- Raymond Fraser (1941–2018), Canadian author
- Rhoda Fraser (1918–1970), Scottish communist and peace campaigner
- Richard Fraser (disambiguation)
- Robert Fraser (disambiguation)
- Robin Fraser (born 1966), Jamaican soccer coach and former player
- Ron Fraser (1933–2013), American college baseball coach
- Ronald Fraser (disambiguation)

== S ==
- Sally Fraser (1932–2019), American actress
- Sarah Fraser (died 1880), Australian brothel keeper
- Scott Fraser (disambiguation)
- Sean Fraser (disambiguation)
- Sheila Fraser (born 1950), Auditor General of Canada
- Shelagh Fraser (1920–2000), English actress
- Shelly-Ann Fraser-Pryce (born 1986), female Jamaican Olympic sprinter
- Simon Fraser (disambiguation)
- Steve Fraser (born 1958), American Greco-Roman wrestler
- Stuart Fraser (disambiguation)
- Suzie Fraser (born 1983), Australian water polo player
- Sylvia Fraser (born 1935), Canadian novelist and travel writer

== T ==
- Thomas Fraser (disambiguation)
- Tom Fraser (1911–1988), British politician
- Tommy Fraser (born 1987), English footballer
- Tomiko Fraser (born 1968), American actress and fashion model

== V ==
- Valerie Fraser, American politician

== W ==
- William Fraser (disambiguation)

== Fictional characters ==
- Benton Fraser, in the TV series Due South

== See also ==
- Lord Fraser, in the Peerage of Scotland
- Baron Fraser of Allander
- Frasers of Philorth, a Scottish family
- Frasier (disambiguation)
- Frazer (name)
- Frazier (disambiguation)
- Fraser syndrome
