= Bill Fraser (disambiguation) =

Bill Fraser (1908–1987) was a Scottish actor.

Bill Fraser may also refer to:

- Bill Fraser (New Zealand politician) (1924–2001), New Zealand politician
- Bill Fraser (ice hockey) (1916–1997), Canadian ice hockey goaltender
- Bill Fraser (Canadian politician), politician in the province of New Brunswick, Canada
- Bill Fraser (Australian footballer) (1867–1938), Australian rules footballer
- Bill Fraser (English footballer) (1907–?), English footballer with Northampton Town and Southampton
- Billy Fraser (born 1945), Scottish footballer with Huddersfield Town and Heart of Midlothian
- Billy Fraser (footballer, born 1868) (1868–?), Scottish footballer with Renton and Stoke City

== See also ==
- William Fraser (disambiguation)
