= Francis Fraser =

Francis Fraser may refer to:

- Francis Charles Fraser (1903–1978), cetologist
- Frankie Fraser (1923–2014), English criminal
- Francis Fraser (politician) (1833–1911), New Zealand politician
- Francis Richard Fraser (1885–1964), Scottish physician

== See also ==
- Frank Fraser (disambiguation)
- Francis Frazer, fictional character
- Frances Frazier, 1988 Miss Georgia
- Frank Frazier (1960–2000), American football player
- Fraser (surname)
