= Ian Frazer (disambiguation) =

Ian Frazer (born 1953) is a Scottish-born Australian immunologist.

Ian Frazer may also refer to:

- Ian Frazer (poker player), English poker player and commentator
- Ian Frazer (cricketer) (born 1966), cricketer

== See also ==
- Ian Frazier (disambiguation)
- Ian Fraser (disambiguation)
- Iain Fraser (disambiguation)
