= William Fraser =

William Fraser may refer to:

== Military people ==
- William W. Fraser (1844–1915), American Civil War soldier and Medal of Honor recipient
- William Archibald Kenneth Fraser (1886–1969), British army officer
- William Fraser (British Army officer) (1890–1964), British army officer
- William M. Fraser III (born 1952), United States Air Force general

== Politicians ==
- William Fraser, of Fraserfield (1691–1727), Scottish landowner and politician, MP for Elgin Burghs 1722–25
- Sir William Fraser, 1st Baronet (1737–1818), Scottish shipowner
- William Fraser (Clerk of the Signet) (died 1802), British politician, Clerk of the Signet and an Undersecretary of State
- Sir William Fraser, 4th Baronet (1826–1898), English politician
- William Fraser (New Zealand politician, born 1827) (1827–1901)
- William Fraser (Canadian politician) (1832–1909), member of the Legislative Assembly of Northwest Territories, 1872–1875
- William Fraser (New Zealand politician, born 1840) (1840–1923)
- William Alexander Fraser (politician) (1886–1962), Canadian politician
- Ian Fraser, Baron Fraser of Lonsdale or William Jocelyn Ian Fraser (1897–1974), British politician and chairman of St Dunstan's
- William Henry Fraser, Canadian politician
- Bill Fraser (New Zealand politician) (William Alex Fraser, 1924–2001), New Zealand politician

== Sportspeople ==
- William Lovat Fraser (1884–1968), Scottish cricketer and rugby union player
- Willie Fraser (footballer) (1929–1996), Australian footballer who played for A.F.C. Sunderland
- Willie Fraser (born 1964), baseball player
- William Fraser (rugby union) (born 1989), English rugby union flanker
- Bill Fraser (ice hockey) (William Fraser, 1916–1997), Canadian ice hockey goaltender
- Bill Fraser (Australian footballer) (William Fraser, 1867–1938), Australian rules footballer
- Bill Fraser (English footballer) (William Fraser, 1907–?), English footballer with Northampton Town and Southampton
- Billy Fraser (William Thomas Fraser, born 1945), Scottish footballer with Huddersfield Town and Heart of Midlothian
- Billy Fraser (footballer, born 1868) (William Fraser, 1868–?), Scottish footballer with Renton and Stoke City

== Other people ==
- William Alexander Fraser (writer) (1859–1933), Canadian writer
- William Fraser (bishop of St Andrews) (died 1297), bishop of St Andrews, guardian of Scotland
- William Fraser, 12th Lord Saltoun (1654–1715), Scottish peer and the 11th Laird of Philorth
- William Fraser (British administrator), working in Madras, India, 1709–1711
- William Fraser (bishop of Arichat) (1779–1851), Canadian Roman Catholic bishop
- William Fraser (British India civil servant) (1784–1835)
- William Fraser (historian) (1816–1898), professor of Scottish history
- William Smith Fraser (1852–1897), American architect
- William Fraser (architect) (1867–1922), Scottish architect
- William Mackenzie Fraser (1878–1960), New Zealand labourer, civil engineer and ethnological collector
- William Fraser, 1st Baron Strathalmond (1888–1970), Scottish businessman and chairman of the Anglo-Iranian Oil Company
- William Kerr Fraser (1929–2018), British civil servant and University of Glasgow vice-chancellor
- William Fraser, 3rd Baron Strathalmond (born 1947), Scottish peer
- William Fraser (moderator) (1851–1919), Free Church of Scotland minister
- Bill Fraser (William Simpson Fraser, 1908–1987), Scottish actor

== See also ==
- Bill Fraser (disambiguation)
- William Frazer (disambiguation)
