= James Earle Fraser =

James Earle Fraser may refer to:

- James Earle Fraser (sculptor) (1876–1953), American sculptor
- James E. Fraser (historian), Canadian historian

== See also ==
- James Fraser (disambiguation)
