= Frazar =

Frazar is a surname. Notable people with the surname include:

- Harrison Frazar (born 1971), American golfer
- Lether Frazar (1904–1960), American politician

== See also ==
- Frazer (name)
