= Sir Simon Fraser =

Sir Simon Fraser may refer to:

- Sir Simon Fraser (died 1306), fought in the Wars of Scottish Independence
- Sir Simon Fraser (Australian politician) (1832–1919), member of the Australian Senate
- Sir Simon Fraser (diplomat) (born 1958), British Permanent Under-Secretary of the Foreign and Commonwealth Office 2010–2015

== See also ==
- Simon Fraser (disambiguation)
