= Charles Fraser =

Charles Fraser may refer to:

- Charles Fraser (artist) (1782–1860), American miniature painter
- Charles Fraser (botanist) (1788–1831), botanist and explorer of Australia
- Charles Fraser (ice hockey) (1897–1970), ice hockey player
- Charles Fraser (missionary), missionary with the Scottish Missionary Society to Russian Tatary
- Charles Fraser (rugby league) (1893–1981), Australian rugby league footballer and coach
- Charles Fraser (surgeon), American heart surgeon
- Charles 'Pop' Fraser (1915–1994), South African military commander
- Charles Craufurd Fraser (1829–1895), Victoria Cross recipient
- Charles Torquil de Montalt Fraser (born 1960), High Sheriff of West Sussex in 2006–2007
- Charles Fraser (footballer) (born 1907), English professional footballer
- Charles Fraser (minister) (1823–1886), New Zealand minister, educationalist and journalist
- Charles Fraser (businessman) (born 1928), Scottish businessman
- Charles E. Fraser (1929–2002), real estate developer in South Carolina
- Charles Frederick Fraser (1850–1925), established the Halifax School for the Blind
- Charles Fraser (cricketer) (1896–1929), Scottish cricketer and officer in the British Indian Army
- Charles Fraser (rugby union) (1868–1916), Scotland international rugby union player
- Charles Ian Fraser (1903–1963), Scottish British Army officer, historian and officer of arms

== See also ==
- Charles Frazer (disambiguation)
- Frasers of Inverallochy for Charles Fraser
- Charlee Fraser (born 1995), Australian fashion model and actress
