= Alexander Fraser =

Alexander Fraser may refer to:

== Lords Saltoun ==
- Alexander Fraser, 11th Lord Saltoun (1604–1693), Scottish peer
- Alexander Fraser, 14th Lord Saltoun (1710–1751)
- Alexander Fraser, 16th Lord Saltoun (1758–1793)
- Alexander Fraser, 17th Lord Saltoun (1785–1853), Scottish peer and British Army general
- Alexander Fraser, 19th Lord Saltoun (1851–1933), Scottish peer
- Alexander Fraser, 20th Lord Saltoun (1886–1979), Scottish peer

== Others ==
- Alexander Fraser (died 1623), founder of Fraserburgh
- Alexander Fraser of Touchfraser and Cowie (died by 1332)
- Alexander Mackenzie Fraser (1756–1809), British general
- Alexander Fraser (Upper Canada politician) (1786–1853), soldier and political figure in Upper Canada and Canada West
- Alexander George Fraser (1786–1865), Scottish painter

- Alexander Fraser (painter) (1827–1899), Scottish landscape painter and son of Alexander George Fraser

- Alexander Fraser (Victorian politician) (1802–1888), member of the Victorian Legislative Council 1858–1881
- Alexander Campbell Fraser (1819–1914), Scottish philosopher
- Alexander Fraser (Ontario politician) (1824–1883), member of the 1st Parliament of Ontario
- Alexander Fraser (British Army officer, born 1824) (1824–1898), General, Royal Engineer who served in Burma
- Alexander Fraser (Australian politician) (1892–1965), senator in the Australian Parliament, later a Victorian Legislative Assembly member
- Alexander E. Fraser (1843–1905), merchant and political figure in Nova Scotia, Canada
- Alexander Cumming Fraser (1845–1944), politician in Manitoba, Canada
- Alexander G. Fraser (1937-2022), American computer scientist
- Alexander V. Fraser (1804–1868), 1st Captain-Commandant of the US Revenue Marine
- Alexander Fraser, 4th Lord Lovat (1527–1557), Scottish peer
- Alexander Fraser (archivist) (1860–1936), Canadian historian
- Alexander Fraser (Royal Navy officer) (1747–1829), Royal Navy officer who rose to the rank of vice-admiral
- Alexander Fraser (1789-1872), Scottish soldier and hero of the Battle of Stoney Creek in the War of 1812

== See also ==
- Alex Fraser (disambiguation)
- Alec Fraser (disambiguation)
- Fraser (surname)
- Alexander Fraizer (1610–1681), Scottish physician
- Alexander Fraser Campbell, George Cross recipient
- Fraser (disambiguation)
