= James Frazer (disambiguation) =

James Frazer was an anthropologist and mythology writer.

James Frazer may also refer to:

- James S. Frazer, American politician, lawyer, and judge
- Private James Frazer, fictional character in the TV series Dad's Army

== See also ==
- James Frazier (disambiguation)
- James Fraser (disambiguation)
