= Ian Frazier (disambiguation) =

Ian Frazier (born 1951) is an American writer.

Ian Frazier may also refer to:

- Ian Frazier (born 1982) is an American musician, multi-instrumentalist and singer-songwriter who wrote "The Ballad of Jonah Hex"
- Ian Frazier, character in 2004 romantic comedy film Wimbledon (film)
- Ian S. Frazier, designer of 2005 computer game Ultima V: Lazarus

== See also ==
- Ian Frazer (disambiguation)
- Ian Fraser (disambiguation)
