= Ian Fraser =

Ian Fraser may refer to:

- Ian Fraser, Baron Fraser of Lonsdale (1897–1974), British politician and businessman
- Sir Ian Fraser (surgeon) (1901–1999) Irish surgeon
- Ian Fraser (cricketer) (1902–1990), New Zealand cricketer
- Ian Fraser, Baron Fraser of Tullybelton (1911–1989), British judge
- Ian Fraser (Plymouth Sutton MP) (1916–1987), British politician, MP for Plymouth Sutton
- Ian Edward Fraser (1920–2008), British Royal Navy officer and Victoria Cross recipient
- Ian Fraser (Royal Navy pilot) (1921–2015), British Royal Navy officer and diplomat
- Ian Fraser (Canadian Army officer) (1932–2026), producer of large-scale military tattoos and events in Canada and overseas
- Ian Fraser (composer) (1933–2014), British composer, nominee for the Academy Award for Original Music Score
- Ian Fraser (broadcaster) (born 1948), New Zealand television interviewer and executive
- Ian Fraser (naturalist) (born 1951), Australian naturalist
- Ian Fraser (New Zealand politician), New Zealand politician, founder of Libertarianz political party
- Ian Fraser (playwright) (born 1962), South African activist and playwright

== See also ==
- Iain Fraser (disambiguation)
- Ian Frazer (disambiguation)
- Ian Frazier (disambiguation)
