= Robert Frazer (disambiguation) =

Robert Frazer may refer to:

- Robert Frazer (1891–1944), American actor who appeared in over 200 films from the 1910s to the 1940s; played the title role in the 1912 film Robin Hood
- Robert Frazer (Lewis and Clark), private on the Lewis and Clark Expedition that kept an unpublished journal
- Robert Frazer (diplomat), United States Envoy to El Salvador (1937–1942)
- Robert Frazer (engineer), British engineer that assisted in building the Grand Crimean Central Railway
- Bob Frazer (born 1971), Canadian actor
- Robert S. Frazer (1849–1936), chief justice of the Supreme Court of Pennsylvania, 1930–1936
- Robert Caine Frazer, one of the pen names of English writer John Creasey (1908–1973)

== See also ==
- Robert Frazier (disambiguation)
- Robert Fraser (disambiguation)
