= Bruce Fraser =

Bruce Fraser may refer to:

- Bruce Fraser, 1st Baron Fraser of North Cape (1888–1981), British admiral during World War II, Admiral of the Fleet
- Sir Bruce Fraser (civil servant) (1910–1993), British civil servant and humorist
- Bruce Fraser (author) (1954–2006), author that specialized in digital color technology
- Bruce Fraser (basketball) (born 1964), American basketball coach
- Bruce Fraser (athlete) (born 1946), English athlete
