= Robert Fraser =

Robert Fraser may refer to:

- Robert Fraser (art dealer) (1937–1986), London art dealer of the 1960s and beyond
- Robert Fraser (bishop) (1858–1914), Scottish Roman Catholic Bishop of Dunkeld
- Robert Fraser (cricketer) (born 1954), Australian cricketer
- Robert Fraser (ITV) (1904–1985), Australian journalist
- Robert Fraser (politician) (c. 1843–1918), Member of the Legislative Assembly, for Electoral district of Brisbane North, Queensland
- Bob Fraser (TV producer) (1945–2011), American television producer, writer and actor
- Bob Fraser (footballer), Scottish football player (Aberdeen FC)
- Robert Fraser (writer) (born 1947), British author and biographer
- Robert Henry Fraser (1869–1947), New Zealand stained glass artist

== In fiction ==
- Sergeant Robert Fraser, a character in the television series Due South (1994–1999)

== See also ==
- Robert Frazer (disambiguation)
- Robert Frazier (disambiguation)
- Robert C. Frasure (1942–1995), U.S. diplomat
