= James Frazier =

James Frazier may refer to:

- James B. Frazier (1856–1937), American politician, U.S. senator, governor of Tennessee
- James B. Frazier Jr. (1890–1978), American politician, U.S. representative
- James Frazier (conductor) (1940–1985), American orchestral conductor
- J. J. Frazier (born 1995), American basketball player
- James Frazier (academic administrator) (21st century), dancer and dean of the Florida State University College of Fine Arts
- James Frazier (high jumper) (born 1959), American high jumper, 1979 and 1980 NCAA outdoor runner-up for the Arizona Wildcats track and field team

== See also ==
- James Fraser (disambiguation)
- James Frazer (disambiguation)
- Jim Frazier (disambiguation)
