= Doug Fraser =

Doug Fraser may refer to:

- Doug Fraser (Australian footballer) (1886–1919), Australian rules footballer
- Doug Fraser (Scottish footballer) (born 1941), Scottish football player and manager
- Doug Fraser (rugby union) (born 1992), Canadian rugby union player
- Douglas Fraser (1916–2008), American labor leader
- Douglas M. Fraser (born 1953), US Air Force general
