= Charles Frazer =

Charles Frazer or Frazier may refer to:

- Charles Frazer (cricketer) (1905–1971), Australian-born English cricketer
- Charles Frazer or Charles Fraser (botanist) (1788–1831), Colonial Botanist of New South Wales, 1821–1831
- Charles Frazier (born 1950), American novelist
- Charlie Frazer (1880–1913), Australian politician
- Charley Frazier (1939–2022), American football player

== See also ==
- Charles Fraser (disambiguation)
