= Caroline Hodgson =

Australian brothel proprietor (died 1908)

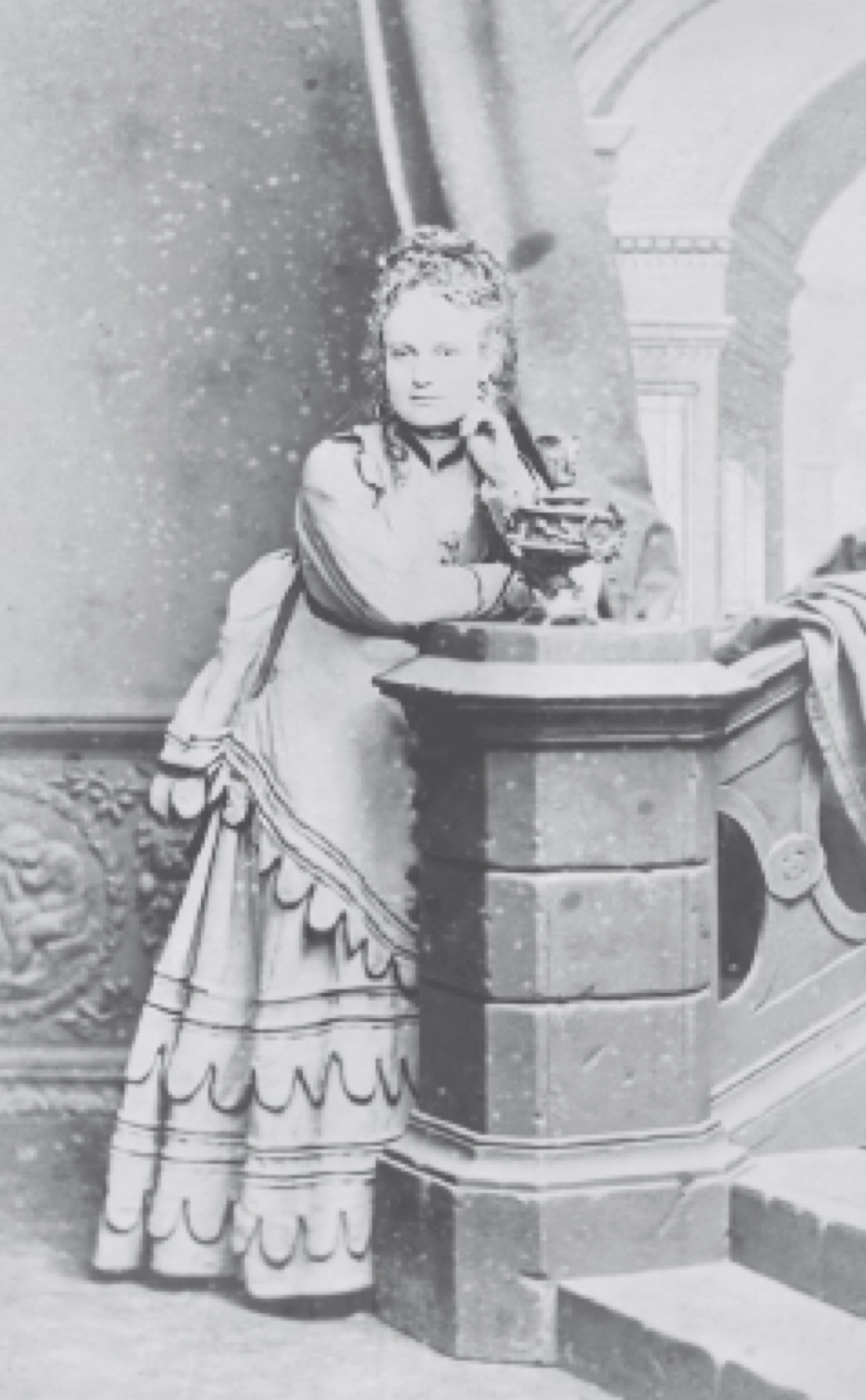
- Hodgson in the 1870s
- Born: 1846–47 or 1851; Potsdam, Prussia
- Died: 11 July 1908; Melbourne, Australia
- Other name: Madame Brussels

Caroline Hodgson (d. 11 July 1908), also known as Madame Brussels, was an Australian brothel madam. She owned a number of establishments in Melbourne's Little Lon district and became one of the city's most successful and best-known madams. Persistently targeted by police, she faced multiple trials under the colony's vagrancy laws. By 1907, all her brothels had closed.

Hodgson was born in Prussia and emigrated to Australia with her husband in 1871. The couple separated soon after their arrival and she began to support herself by operating a boarding house. In 1874 she opened a brothel next door and soon expanded her business to multiple premises. She operated a number of establishments on Lonsdale Street, including an opulent gentleman's club that was frequented by many of the city's elites.

While prostitution had once been reluctantly tolerated, over the course of her career the city grew increasingly hostile to sex workers. Hodgson was targeted by anti-prostitution campaigners, vilified in the press, and faced a series of prosecutions. Her first trial in 1889 ended in an acquittal, while the second in 1898 resulted in a conviction but no real penalty. In 1906 she was brought to trial again and was the subject of a series of exposés in the newspaper Truth; she closed her brothels and retired in order to avoid a conviction.

Hodgson's main establishment at 34 Lonsdale Street has been described as the most famous high-end brothel of its era. She maintained close ties with members of Melbourne's elite, including with the politicians David Gaunson and Samuel Gillott who defended her at trial. Today, a cocktail bar and a laneway in central Melbourne bear the name "Madame Brussels" in reference to her assumed name.

== Early life ==
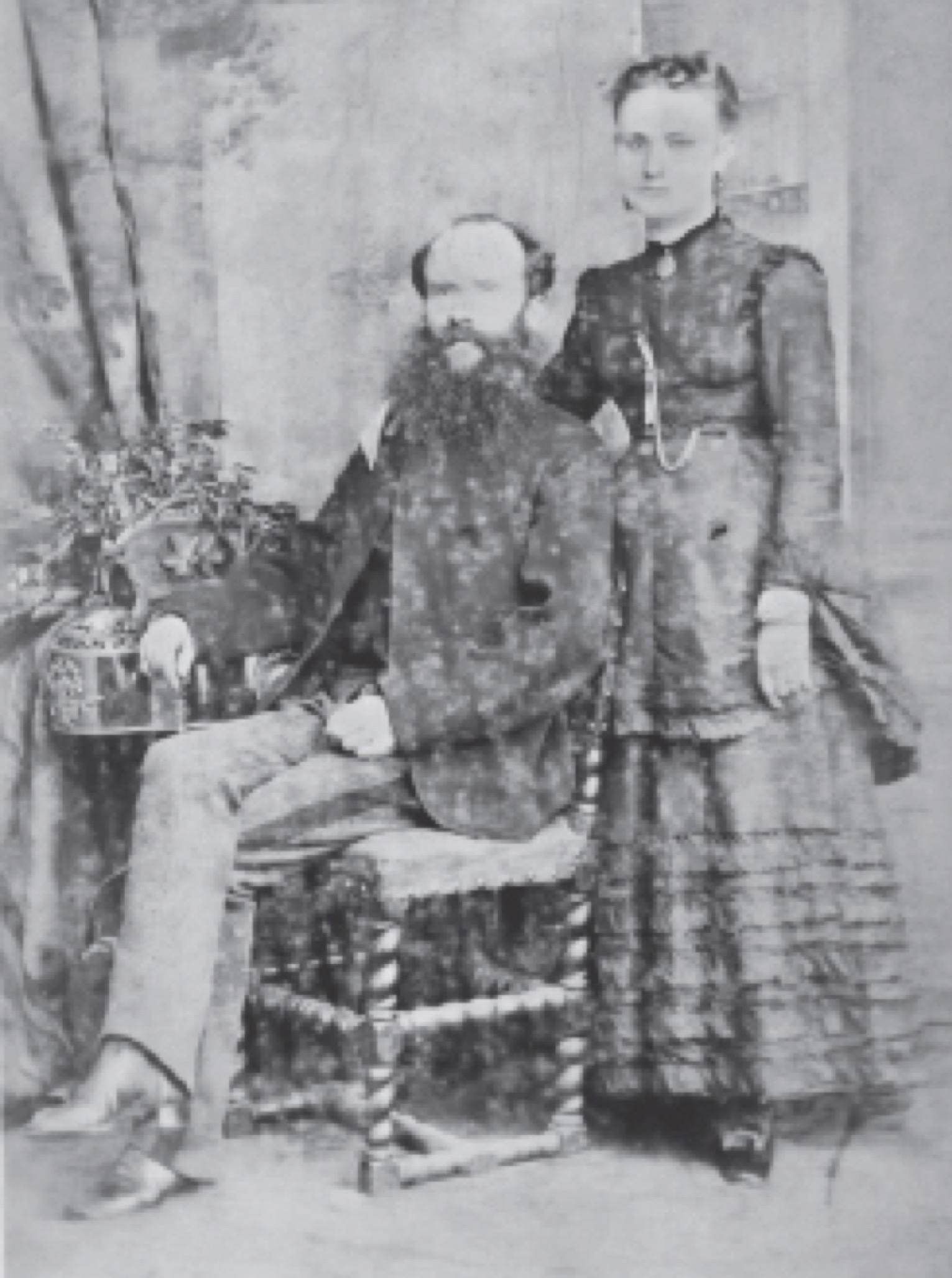
Caroline Hodgson and her husband Studholme at the time of their wedding

Caroline Hodgson was born in the town of Beelitz near Potsdam, Prussia. The year of her birth is unknown; her entry in the Australian Dictionary of Biography gives 1851 as her birth year, while the historian Barbara Minchinton believes she was more likely born in either 1846 or 1847. She was likely illegitimate, but eventually took the name of her stepfather Johann Baptist Lohmar. By her early teenage years her mother, stepfather, and stepmother had all died, leaving Caroline and her older sister to care for their three younger siblings. Minchinton believes that it is possible that she worked in a high-class brothel in Brussels, either as a sex worker or as a domestic servant, during her teenage years.

On 18 February 1871 she married Studholme George Hodgson in London. The couple moved to Australia and arrived in Melbourne in July 1871, where they joined Studholme's brother and his family. Studholme initially took a job with the Melbourne Omnibus Company, possibly as a clerk, and then became a police officer in late 1872. He was soon posted to Mansfield in country Victoria while Caroline remained in Melbourne. From that point on the couple had effectively separated, although they remained close throughout their lives.

== Career ==
=== Expansion of brothels ===
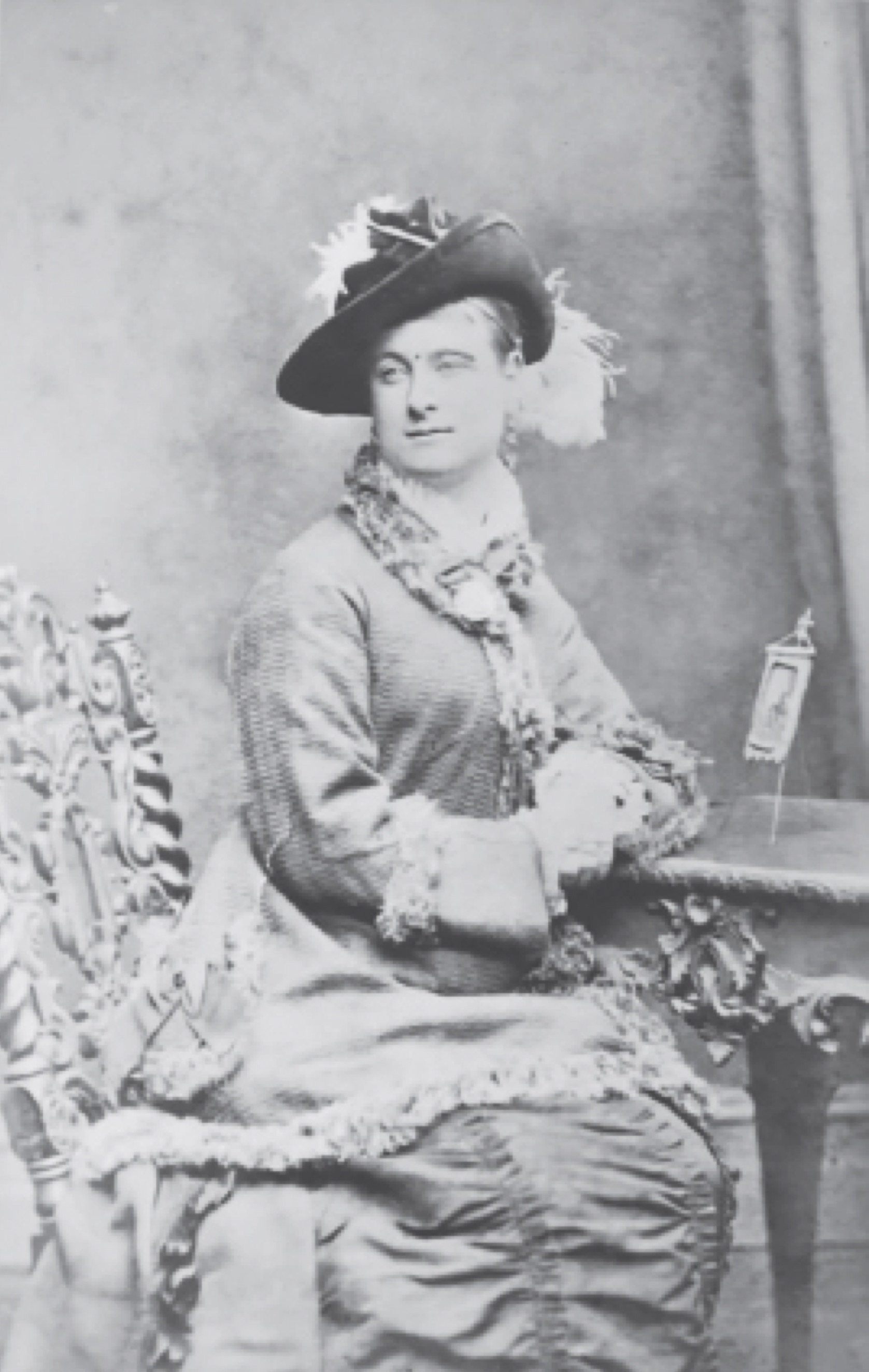
Caroline Hodgson, pictured c. 1875–1880

In 1873, with her husband posted to the country and her brother-in-law recently bankrupt, Caroline began making her living by operating a boarding house in Hotham. By December 1874 she had constructed a new six-room house next door, where she began to operate a brothel. Sex work was legal in Melbourne, but the colony's vagrancy laws meant that brothel keepers were often charged with being the "keeper of a disorderly house" and sex workers were frequently charged with "having no visible lawful means of support". Until the late 19th century, sex work was largely reluctantly tolerated in the city. But from the 1870s onwards, prostitution began to attract greater public condemnation.

After two years, she had earned enough from her business to purchase a house at 169 Lonsdale Street East for £850, borrowing part of the sum from the politician Samuel Gillott. By 1879 Hodgson had adopted the name "Madame Brussels" and was renting three additional premises on Lonsdale Street. She extended her home at 169 Lonsdale Street East a few years later and bought the adjoining properties at 171 and 167 Lonsdale Street East.

In the 1880s the police began to make greater efforts to police sex work and reduce its visibility within the city. The police cleared many of the brothels from Stephen Street and other "respectable" areas in preparation for the 1880 Melbourne International Exhibition. Hodgson's brothels were also helped by the death of the competing madam Sarah Fraser in 1880, allowing her to build a thriving business amid Melbourne's economic boom of the 1880s.

By the mid-1880s, Hodgson was using her three adjoining properties at 167–171 Lonsdale Street East (later renumbered as 32–34 Lonsdale Street) as an exclusive gentlemen's club and as her personal residence, while operating cheaper brothels from her other rented houses on the street. She named her private home at 34 Lonsdale Street "Studholme Villa" after her husband. She also bought another home in St Kilda next door to the home of her future lawyer David Gaunson. In 1888 Hodgson adopted a baby named Lily who had been abandoned by her mother and named her Irene Hodgson.

In the late 1880s, many of the slums that housed brothels were also torn down. The area surrounding Hodgson's brothels in the north-east corner of the city grid—near to Melbourne's centres of power—became a hub for sex workers who found themselves increasingly unwelcome elsewhere in the city. The area eventually grew into a red light district known as Little Lon. Sex work was generally tolerated within the district by police, despite the complaints of some residents. Hodgson was among the beneficiaries of the centralisation of sex work in the Little Lon district, and likely also benefited from police protection.

=== Trial and first retirement ===
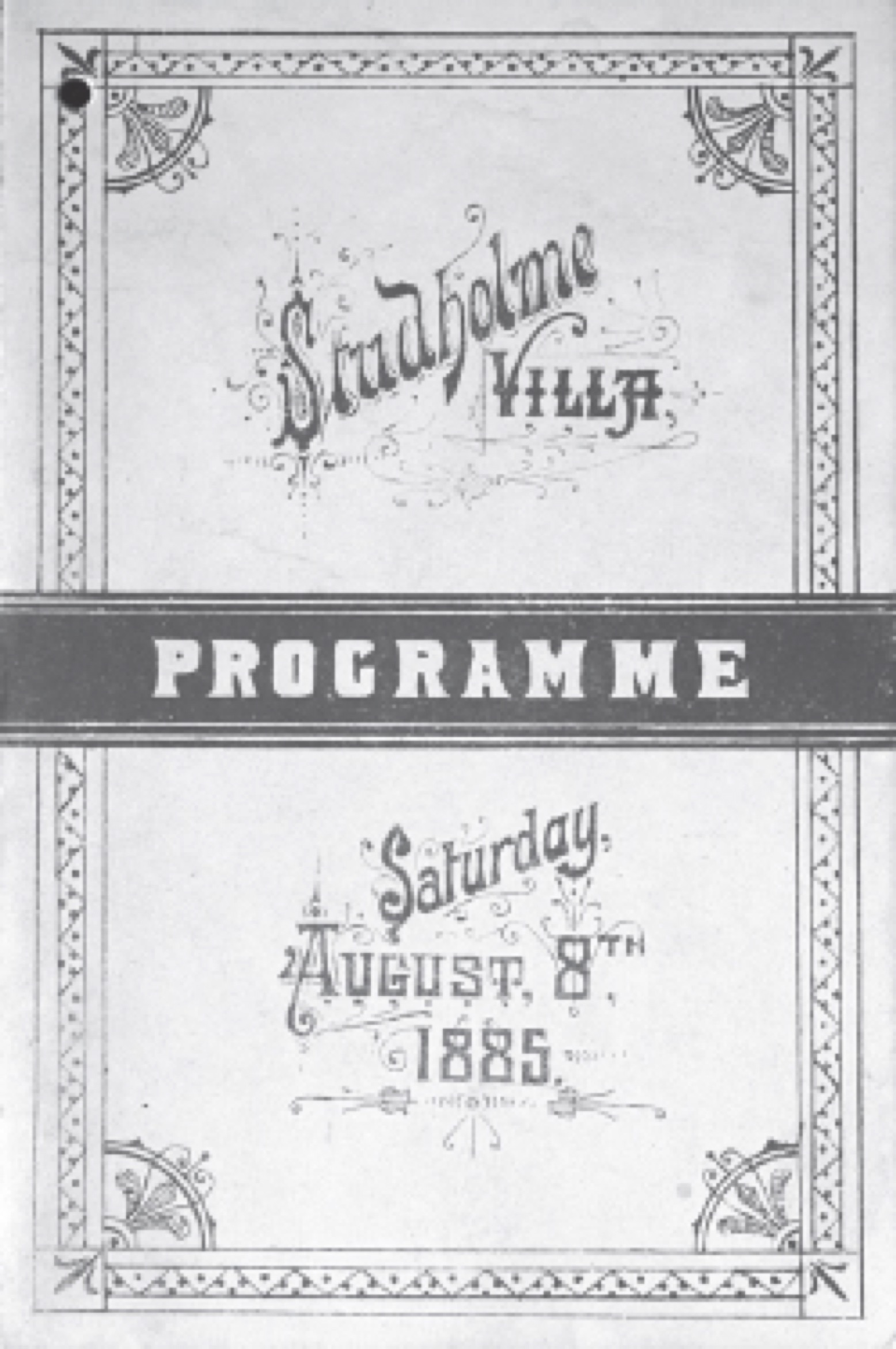
Dance card for an 1885 event hosted at Caroline Hodgson's home

Several religious groups, including the Catholic Church and the Salvation Army, set up missions in the Little Lon district in the 1880s and began to target Hodgson. The preacher and moral campaigner Henry Varley condemned her in speeches while threatening to reveal the names of her wealthy clients. Varley accused Hodgson of luring young girls into prostitution, which had become the cause of a widespread moral panic as a result of the 1885 Eliza Armstrong case. Varley and the Salvation Army began preparing a private prosecution of Hodgson under the colony's vagrancy laws. Rather than addressing Hodgson's specific alleged offence, the 1889 trial centred on two questions: whether Hodgson was truly procuring innocent young women into prostitution (several women from the brothel testified to the contrary), and whether closing Hodgson's brothels would be a net positive for the city. According to Minchinton, the defence's argument was "effectively that brothels cannot be eliminated and that Caroline Hodgson's brothel was a good deal better managed than most". Hodgson was ultimately acquitted by a split panel of judges.

Melbourne's newspapers widely condemned the acquittal and ridiculed the judges. Varley, furious at the judgement, launched a private prosecution against another brothel owner, Madame Vine, and succeeded in obtaining a 12-month jail sentence for her and her business partner. Varley also attempted to launch a boycott of businesses that sold goods to Hodgson's brothels. As Varley's campaign continued to pick up pace, Hodgson began to prepare to exit the industry. In 1891 Varley and the Society for the Promotion of Morality succeeded in lobbying for new laws that increased the legal exposure of sex workers and brothel owners.

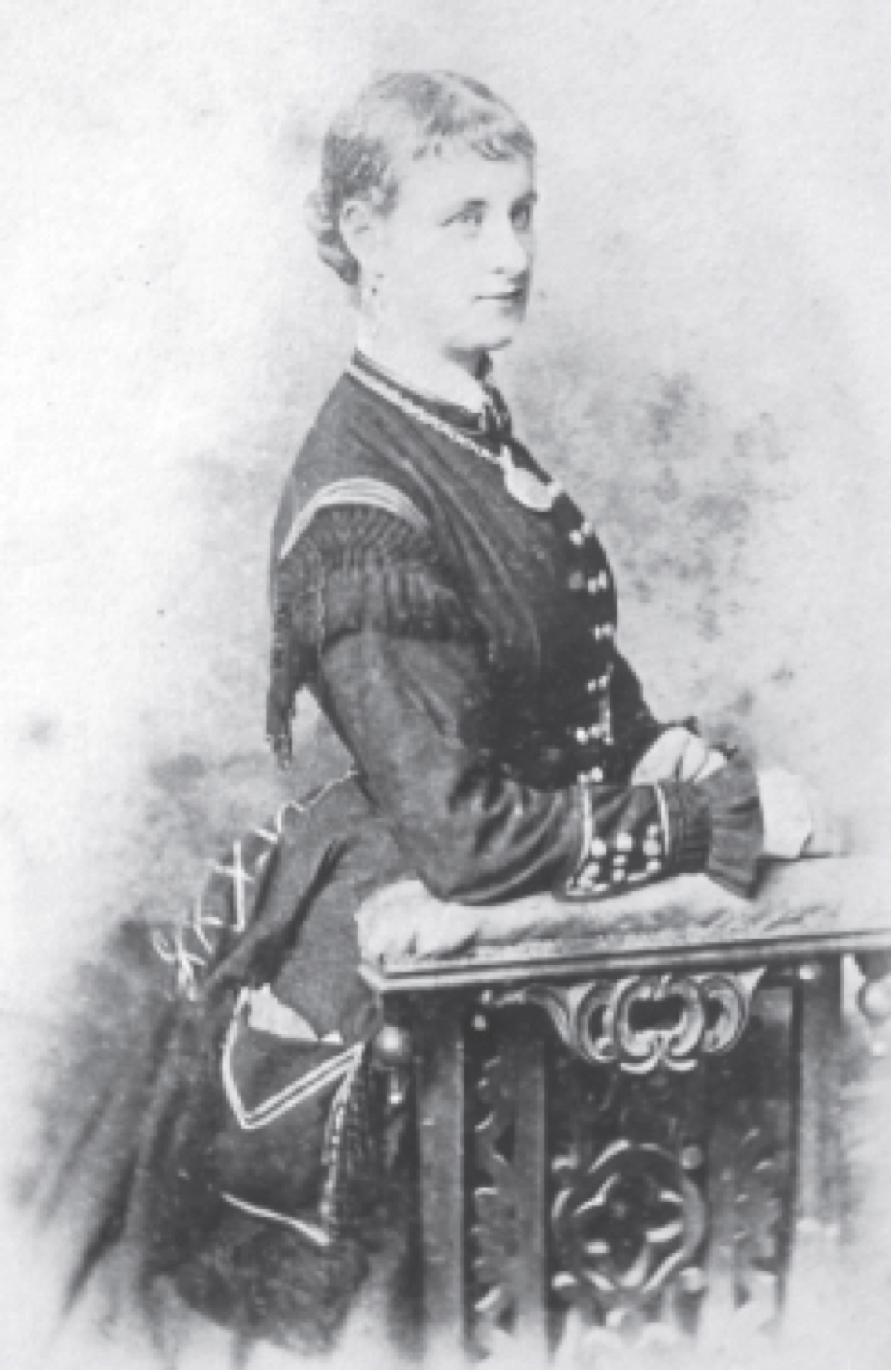
Caroline Hodgson, pictured c. 1875–1879

As part of Varley's campaign against Hodgson, he revealed that one of her customers was the composer and music critic Alfred Plumpton. One 1903 newspaper article would later suggest that Plumpton and Hodgson were romantically involved and that they had had a daughter together. Minchinton is sceptical of this claim and believes that it is relatively unlikely that Hodgson was the mother of Plumpton's daughter Cara. Varley's campaign against both Hodgson and Plumpton eventually drove Plumpton to return to England.

In 1890 Hodgson purchased a home in St Kilda, likely in preparation to retire with her adopted daughter. In 1891, after the end of the Melbourne Centennial Exhibition and amidst the beginnings of an economic depression in Melbourne, Hodgson scaled down her business, closing her cheaper brothels and continuing her operations solely at 32–34 Lonsdale Street. Despite their decades of separation, she cared for her husband Studholme at her home in St Kilda in the months leading up to his death in February 1893. Her housekeeper, Martha Burrell, likely continued to operate her brothels in her absence.

In 1894, Hodgson travelled to Europe and visited her sisters in Germany, with Burrell once again managing her business in her absence. She left her daughter Irene in Germany and returned to Melbourne in April 1895. Just days after her return, she married a German man named Jacob Pohl. After her marriage to Pohl, she appears to have closed her brothels entirely. She returned to Europe with Pohl in early 1896, but soon after their arrival Pohl left Hodgson to visit his parents and then informed her by letter that he had decided to leave for South Africa and would contact her in a couple of years. At the end of that year, Caroline returned to Australia with Irene. She moved into her home at 34 Lonsdale Street and sent Irene away to boarding school. She had continued to earn an income by collecting rent on her home in St Kilda, but had been affected by Melbourne's depression and was in need of money. Despite the increasingly anti-prostitution climate, she reopened her brothel in 1897.

=== Brothel reopening and second trial ===
By the time Hodgson restarted her business, the police magistrate Joseph Panton and the superintendent Thomas O'Callaghan had implemented far stronger anti-prostitution measures. There was also greater competition in the Little Lon district, with Hodgson's brothel at 32–34 Lonsdale Street no longer secure in its position as the city's most high-class establishment. In February 1898 six other brothel owners were charged under the colony's vagrancy laws, although the cases were all eventually withdrawn. By May, there were no more brothels on Exhibition Street, and the number on Lonsdale Street had declined from 13 to eight. By August, that number had been reduced to just three.

Hodgson was brought back to court in August of that year along with the women who were operating the two other remaining brothels on Lonsdale Street. Her defence lawyer argued that if the brothels in Little Lon were to close, the practice of prostitution would simply spread elsewhere in the city and the street would become filled with "Syrians, Hindus and Chinese". The panel of magistrates agreed and dismissed the case. The decision was condemned by the city's newspapers, with one paper pointing out that "the magistrates had driven away all the poorer class of brothels, but the swell brothelkeepers were to be privileged". The prosecutors appealed the dismissal to the Supreme Court, which overturned the decision, effectively ordering the lower court to convict the three defendants. The magistrates of the lower court once again suggested that they would prefer to allow the three brothels in Lower Lon to continue operating, as the alternative would be for sex work to spread across the city but the magistrates convicted the women as ordered and sentenced them to confinement "during the sitting of the court", leaving them free as soon as the day's court session ended.

After the conclusion of the case, the Daily Telegraph accused Hodgson of employing young girls as prostitutes, (Note: In her biography of Hodgson, Barbara Minchinton wrote that there was no evidence that Hodgson ever used coercion or employed girls under the age of consent in her brothels.) and of employing blackmail to gain influence with her customers and the police. It was also suggested that the panel of magistrates had been "stacked"—both by supporters and opponents of the brothel owners—in what was a common corrupt practice at the time. Hodgson was free to continue operating her business, but maintained a discreet profile for the next eight years.

=== Third trial and death ===
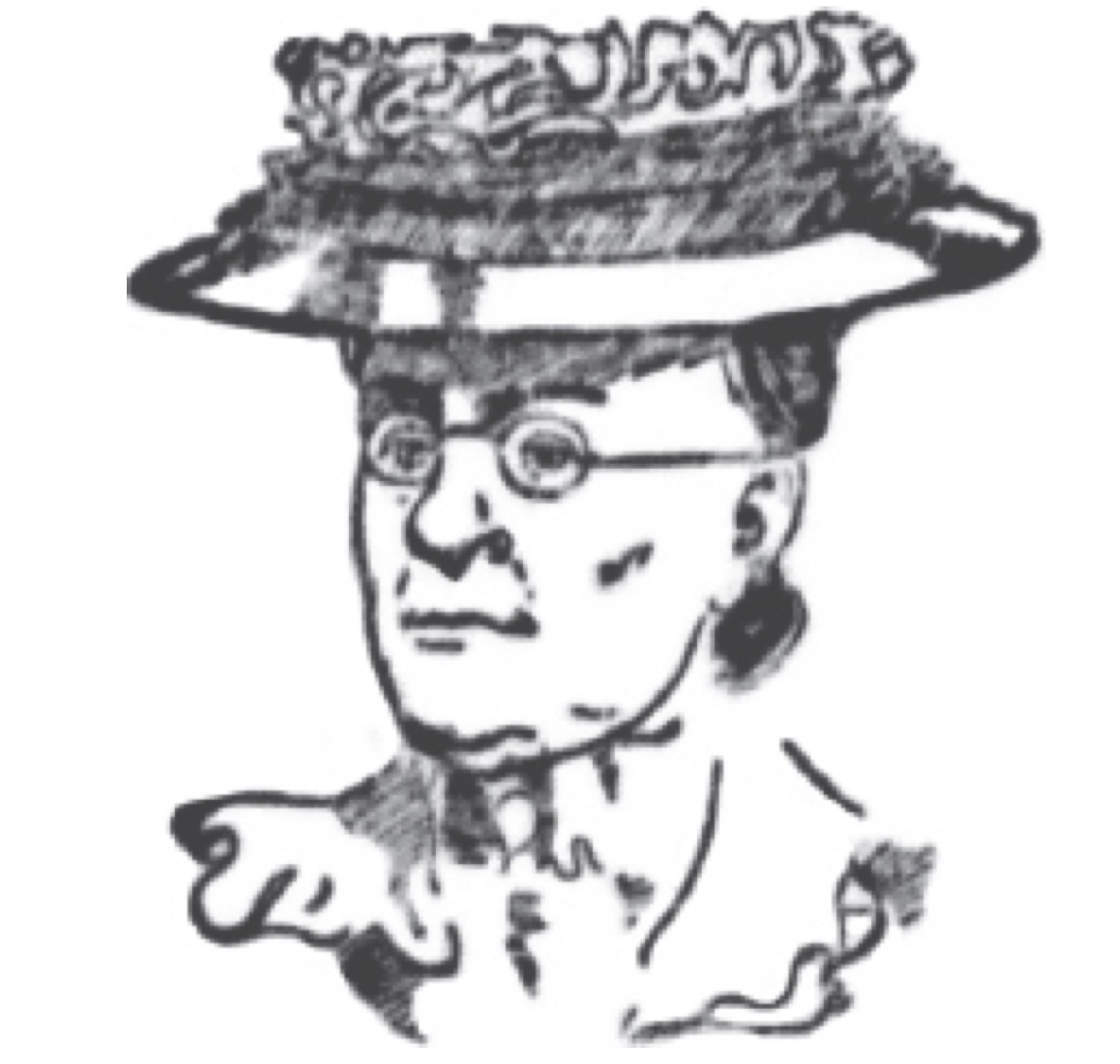
Sketch of Caroline Hodgson published in Truth in 1906

In the late 1890s Jacob Pohl returned to Australia, but soon left Hodgson again; she eventually divorced him in 1906 on the grounds of desertion. By 1899 she had reopened her brothel at 32 Lonsdale Street. In 1902, she reopened her cheaper brothels at 6–8 Lonsdale Street. While she was not making nearly as much as she had at her peak of success in the 1880s, she was once again able to make a substantial living. While "Madame Brussels" was still notorious—her name synonymous with the city's high-end brothels—her establishments were increasingly rundown and her clientele list featured fewer wealthy and powerful names.

In 1906 the brothel at 32 Lonsdale Street was raided after the theft of a watch from a customer. Hodgson was charged with being the "keeper of a disorderly house". Maud Gamble, who had been working in the house, was acquitted of the theft. Hodgson was criticised by the magistrate for operating a house of "harpies", but the panel ultimately released her without conviction, ruling that "the publicity given to the case will be sufficient punishment".

Also in 1906 Truth published an exposé on the politician Samuel Gillott revealing that he had loaned Hodgson money for the purchase of her properties. The paper soon published several more pieces condemning Hodgson, branding her the "wickedest woman in Melbourne". Panton, the police magistrate, had lost patience with the district's brothel keepers; he sentenced another madam to prison, declaring that the brothels were "nests of vampires". Seven more madams, including Hodgson, were soon charged. In anticipation of her court date on 18 April, Hodgson gave up her brothels and closed her business. Panton did not record a conviction, but told Hodgson that she must sell her home at 34 Lonsdale Street and move out within 14 days. Truth celebrated her fall, writing a mock obituary that declared that it represented "the extermination of at least one plague spot in the city, and the greatest one of them all".

The historian Raelene Frances writes that the exposé of Gillott and the retirement of Hodgson marked the end of the era of the "grand brothel" in Melbourne. The exposé ended Gillott's political career, driving other powerful men to avoid publicly associating themselves with sex workers, and forced the government to take action to crack down on prostitution. In 1907, shortly after Hodgson's retirement, the Victorian parliament passed a new law prohibiting sex work and criminalising landlords who rented their properties for use as brothels. The new law all but banished prostitution from the public eye. The Little Lon district had by this point begun to be inhabited by a greater number of first generation immigrants and was home to warehouses, factories, and shops. While Hodgson had been given just 14 days to move out of her house at 34 Lonsdale Street, she was still living there when she died a year later. She had developed diabetes and chronic pancreatitis and died in her home on 12 July 1908. Hodgson was buried beside her husband Studholme in St Kilda Cemetery. After her death, her brothel was purchased by the businessman Alexander Lugton and redeveloped into an engineering workshop.

== Legacy ==
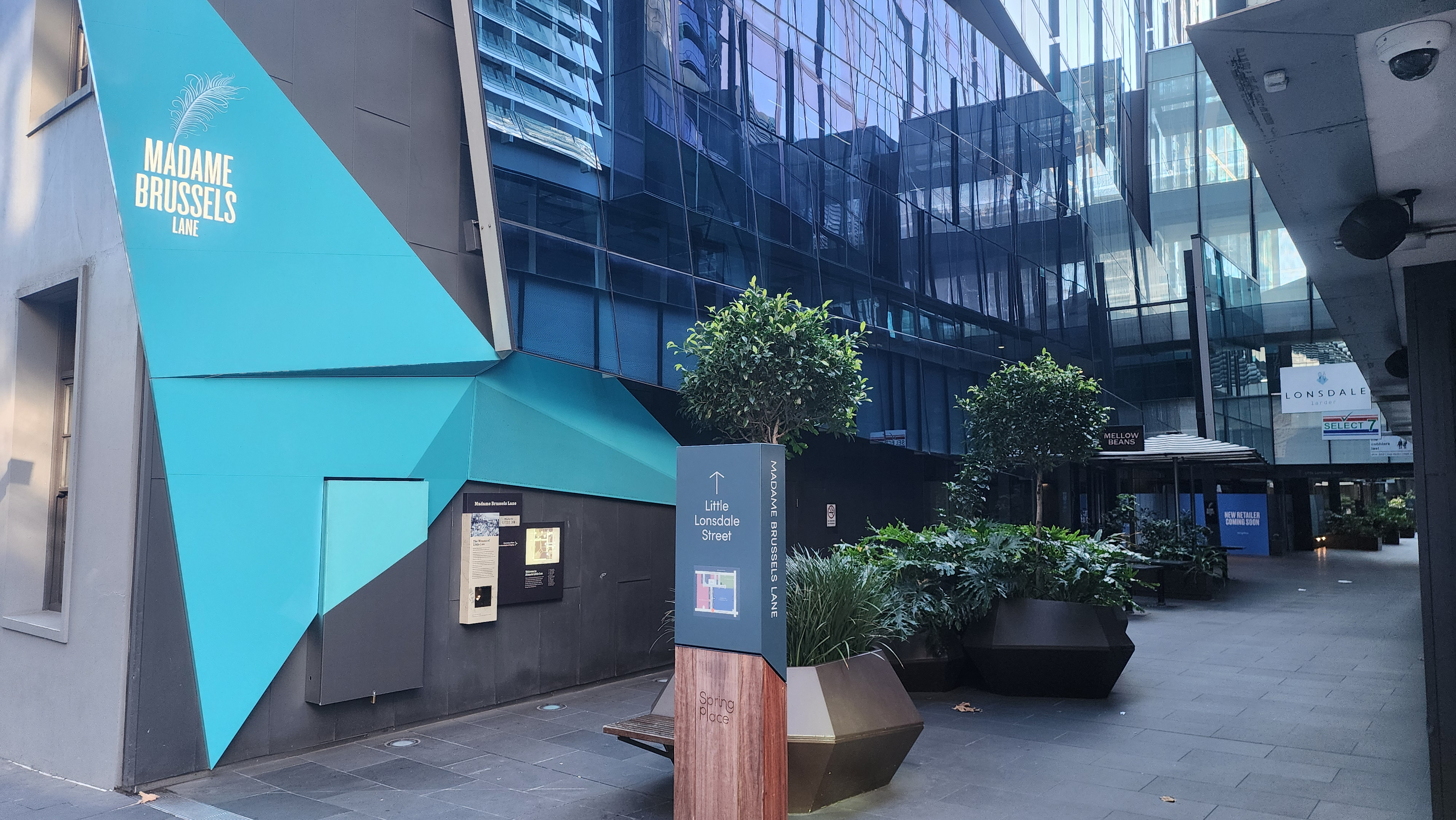
The entry of Madame Brussels Lane from Lonsdale Street

Hodgson was one of the most notorious brothel keepers of her era. The historian Raelene Frances has described Hodgson's premises at 32 Lonsdale Street as the most famous of Melbourne's high-end brothels. Hodgson's biographer Barbara Minchinton writes that her life mirrored Melbourne's own trajectory, writing that she "rode the wave of Melbourne's boom in the 1880s, weathered the storm of the depression years in the 1890s and suffered as a result of the outburst of moral panic in the 1900s".

While sex work was tolerated in Melbourne during Hodgson's lifetime, the practice was prohibited and banished from public view in the city in the years following her death. The Little Lon district was redeveloped in the 1940s and became the site of multiple archaeological excavations exploring its past as a slum and red light district from the late 1980s onwards. According to Minchinton, Hodgson is today regarded as something of a cult figure. A bar and laneway in central Melbourne bear the name "Madame Brussels". In 2018, the first photos of Hodgson were rediscovered by one of her descendants and were donated to the State Library of Victoria. Minchinton's biography of Hodgson was published in 2024 and was shortlisted for the National Biography Award by the State Library of New South Wales.

== See also ==
- Sarah Fraser
