= Andrew Frazer =

Andrew Frazer may refer to:

- Andrew Frazer, a pen name of the American author Stephen Marlowe (1928–2008)
- Andrew Frazer (British Army officer) (died 1792)

== See also ==
- Andrew Fraser (disambiguation)
