= Robert Frazier =

Robert Frazier may refer to:

- Robert Frazier (writer) (born 1951), American writer
- Rob Frazier (born 1953), American Christian musician
- Robert F. Frazier (born 1949), American politician from Pennsylvania
- Robert Frazier (boxer), US Golden Globe light welterweight champion in 1992

== See also ==
- Robert Frazer (disambiguation)
- Robert Fraser (disambiguation)
