= Frazer (name) =

Frazer is both a given name and a surname.

Notable people with the name include:

== Given name ==
- Frazer Hines, British actor
- Frazer Irving, British comic artist
- Frazer Richardson (born 1982), English footballer

== Surname ==
- Augustus Simon Frazer (1776–1835), British Army officer during the Napoleonic Wars
- Bob Frazer, Canadian actor
- Charles Fraser (botanist) (1788–1831), Scottish-born botanist and explorer in Australia
- Dan Frazer, American actor
- Gordon Frazer, Australian engineer
- Ian Frazer, Scottish-Australian physician and scientist, joint inventor of the HPV vaccine
- Jendayi Frazer, U.S. Assistant Secretary of State for African Affairs
- James George Frazer (1854–1941), Scottish social anthropologist, author of The Golden Bough
- James S. Frazer (1824–1893), American judge and politician
- John Frazer, British architect
- June Frazer (1936–2024), American politician
- J. D. Frazer, pen name Illiad, artist and writer of the webcomic User Friendly
- Joseph W. Frazer, American automobile executive
- Lily Frazer (born 1988), British actress
- Lucy Frazer, British M.P.
- Margaret Frazer (1946–2013), American writer
- Nathan Frazer (born 1998), ring name of English professional wrestler Benjamin Timms
- Persifor Frazer (1736–1792), American Revolutionary officer
- Rolando Frazer (born 1958), Panamanian basketball player
- Ron Frazer (1928–1983), Australian actor and comedian
- Tess Frazer, American actress
- William C. Frazer (1776–1838), U.S. federal territorial judge
- Will Frazer (1959–), American Educator

== Fictional characters ==
- Frazer Yeats, a character from the Network Ten soap opera Neighbours
- Chloe Frazer, a character from the video game Uncharted franchise
- Private James Frazer, a character in the British television sitcom Dad's Army

== See also ==
- Fraser (surname)
