= Neil Fraser =

Neil Fraser (or similar) may refer to:

- Mad Professor (born 1955), British music producer born Neil Joseph Stephen Fraser in Guyana
- Neil Fraser, guitarist with Asphalt Ribbons and Tindersticks
- Neil Fraser (civil servant), Canadian civil servant sacked for his opposition to the metric system
- Neil Fraser (Canadian football) from 1984 CFL draft
- Neil Frazer (artist), New Zealand artist and 1992 Frances Hogkins Fellow
- Neil Frazer (karate)
- Neil Frazer (rugby league), English rugby league player (Workington Town)

== See also ==
- Fraser (surname)
