= Alex Fraser =

Alex Fraser may refer to:

== People ==
- Alex Fraser (scientist) (1923–2002), Australian scientist
- Alex Fraser (politician) (1916–1989), Canadian politician
- Alex Fraser (Australian footballer) (1908–1983), Australian rules footballer for St Kilda
- Alex Fraser (Scottish footballer), Scottish footballer for Rangers
- Henry Brinton (1901–1977), who wrote under the pseudonym "Alex Fraser"

== Other uses ==
- Alex Fraser Bridge, British Columbia, Canada
- Alex Fraser Research Forest, British Columbia, Canada

== See also ==
- Fraser (surname)
- Alexander Fraser (disambiguation)
- Alec Fraser (disambiguation)
- Fraser (disambiguation)
