= Sarah Fraser =

Australian brothel keeper

Sarah Fraser, also called Mother Fraser (died 1880) was an Australian brothel keeper.

She was the daughter of a British convict. She established a brothel in the Little Lon red light district in Melbourne in the mid-19th century. Her brothel was the perhaps most expensive and famed brothel in Australia prior to that of Madame Brussels, and she was referred to as the Queen of Brothels.

In 1867, when Queen Victoria's son Alfred, Duke of Saxe-Coburg and Gotha visited Australia, police official Frederick Standish escorted the prince to the brothel of Fraser, where he bought sex from his mistress, Sarah Saqui. This attracted great attention, and according to urban myth Fraser claimed her brothel had royal protection and had the royal banner raised above it.
