= Jim Frazier =

Jim Frazier may refer to:

- Jim Frazier (American football) (born c. 1941), American football coach
- Jim Frazier (inventor) (1940–2022), Australian inventor, naturalist and cinematographer
- Jim Frazier (politician) (born 1959), American politician

== See also ==
- James Frazier (disambiguation)
