= Frank Fraser =

Frank Fraser may refer to:

- Frank Clarke Fraser (1920–2014), Canadian medical geneticist
- Frank L. Fraser (died 1935), American lawyer and politician

== See also ==
- Frank Frazier (1960–2000), American football guard
- Frankie Fraser (1923-2014), English gangster
