= Donald Allan Fraser =

Donald Allan Fraser (24 November 1793 – 7 February 1843) was a Scottish-born Presbyterian minister in Nova Scotia and Newfoundland.

The son of Alexander Fraser, a Church of Scotland minister, and Isabella Maclean, he was born in Torosay, Isle of Mull and was educated in Edinburgh and at the University of Edinburgh. In 1814, he was ordained as a minister and, in the same year, married Catherine Isabella Maclean. After serving congregations on Mull, in London and at Tain, he came to Pictou County, Nova Scotia in 1817 in response to the requirement there for a Gaelic-speaking minister. In 1833, he was chosen as the first moderator of the Synod of Nova Scotia for the Church of Scotland. Fraser moved to Lunenburg County in 1838. He also served as commissioner of schools there. In 1841, Fraser moved to St. John's to lead the first Presbyterian congregation there.

Fraser died in St. John's at the age of 49.

His son James Oliphant Fraser and his grandson James Oliphant Fraser, Jr. both served in the Newfoundland assembly.
