= Donald Fraser =

Donald or Don Fraser may refer to:

== Law and politics ==
- Donald F. Fraser (1872–1946), Canadian politician
- Donald M. Fraser (British politician) (1904–?), British politician, chair of the Common Wealth Party
- Donald J. Fraser (1908–1982), Canadian politician in Nova Scotia
- Donald M. Fraser (1924–2019), U.S. congressman from Minnesota
- Donald Fraser (Ohio politician) (1927–2010), American politician, member of the Ohio House of Representatives

== Religion ==
- Donald Allan Fraser (1793–1843), Scottish Presbyterian minister in Nova Scotia and Newfoundland
- Donald B. Fraser (1868–1952), British Unitarian minister and political activist
- Donald Fraser (missionary) (1870–1933), Scottish missionary in Africa

== Sports ==
- Donald Fraser (Scottish footballer) (fl. 1889–1890), Scottish footballer
- Don Fraser (footballer, born 1882) (1882–1963), Australian rules footballer for Collingwood
- Don Fraser Sr. (1901–1978), Australian rules footballer for Oakleigh and Richmond
- Mopsy Fraser (Donald William James Fraser, 1922–1987), Australian rules footballer for Richmond, Port Melbourne and Prahran, son of the above
- Don Fraser (figure skater) (born 1955), Canadian pair skater

== Others ==
- Donald A. S. Fraser (1925–2020), Canadian statistician
- Donald Hamilton Fraser (1929–2009), British landscape painter
- Donald Fraser (geologist) (born 1949), British geologist
