= Richard Fraser =

Richard Fraser may refer to:

- Richard Fraser of Touchfraser (13–14th century), Scottish noble
- Richard Fraser (lyricist), English roadie and lyricist for Emerson, Lake and Palmer
- Richard Duncan Fraser (c. 1784–1857), Canadian fur trader and businessman
- Richard Fraser (actor) (1913–1971), English actor
- Richard S. Fraser (1913–1988), American Trotskyist and revolutionary integrationist
- Richard Fraser (curler), Canadian wheelchair curler
- Rick Fraser (politician) (born 1972), Canadian politician

== See also ==
- Ricky Frazier (born 1958), American basketball player
