= Alec Fraser =

Alec Fraser may refer to:

- Alec Fraser (actor) (1884–1956), British actor
- Alec Fraser (footballer), Scottish footballer
- Alec Garden Fraser (1873–1962), educator

== See also ==
- Alec Fraser-Brunner, British ichthyologist
- Fraser (surname)
- Alex Fraser (disambiguation)
- Alexander Fraser (disambiguation)
