= James Fraser =

James Fraser or James Frazer may refer to:

== Politics ==
- James Fraser (businessman) (c. 1760–1822), merchant, judge and politician in New Brunswick
- James Fraser (Lower Canada politician) (c. 1785–1844), merchant and political figure in Lower Canada
- James S. Frazer (1824–1893), Justice of the Indiana Supreme Court
- James Oliphant Fraser (1826–1904), businessman and political figure in Newfoundland
- James Harshaw Fraser (1841–1899), lawyer and political figure in Ontario
- James A. Fraser (1843–1937), gold miner and Canadian politician
- James Oliphant Fraser Jr. (1858–1896), lawyer and politician in Newfoundland
- James Fraser (Western Australian politician) (1889–1961), trade unionist and politician
- Jim Fraser (politician) (1908–1970), Australian politician, member of the Australian Parliament

== Sports ==
- James Fraser (footballer) (fl. 1880s), Scottish footballer
- Jim Fraser (Australian footballer) (1896–1975), Australian rules footballer
- Jim Fraser (American football) (1936–2020), American football linebacker
- Jimmy Fraser (born 1948), Australian football goalkeeper
- Jim Fraser (Scottish footballer) (fl. 1960s)
- James Fraser (rugby union) (1859–1943), Scotland international rugby union player
- James Fraser (cricketer) (1840–1913), Scottish cricketer and merchant

== Others ==
- James Fraser of Brea (1639–1699), Scottish Covenanter
- James Fraser of Castle Leathers (1670–1760), Scottish soldier
- James Fraser (minister) (1700–1769), Scottish minister
- Lt. Col. James Fraser (executed 1813), British military in Kedopok War
- James Baillie Fraser (1783–1856), Scottish author
- James Stuart Fraser (1783–1869), British army officer in the Madras army in India
- James Fraser younger of Belladrum (died 1832), Scottish slave owner
- James John Fraser (1789–1834), 3rd Baronet of Leadclune, lieutenant-colonel in the British Army
- James Fraser (publisher) (died 1841), Scottish publisher associated with Thomas Carlyle
- James Fraser (police officer) (1816–1892), British army officer and police officer
- James Fraser (bishop) (1818–1885), English religious leader
- Sir James George Frazer (1854–1941), Scottish social anthropologist and folklorist
- James Fraser (railways administrator) (1861–1936), railways commissioner in New South Wales
- Sir James Fraser (1863–1936), British psychologist and creator of the Fraser spiral illusion
- James Earle Fraser (sculptor) (1876–1953), American sculptor
- James O. Fraser (1886–1938), Missionary to China, creator of the Lisu alphabet
- Sir James Fraser, 2nd Baronet (1924–1997), Scottish academic surgeon
- James W. Fraser (active 1968–2014), American educationalist, pastor, and academic administrator
- James Fraser (university administrator) (born 1948), principal of the University of the Highlands and Islands, Scotland
- James E. Fraser (historian) (fl. 2000s), Canadian historian

== Fictional ==
- Jamie Fraser (character), a character in the Outlander series of novels by Diana Gabaldon
- James Fraser (Home and Away), a character on the Australian soap opera Home and Away
- Private James Frazer, a character in the TV series Dad's Army

== See also ==
- James Fraser Stoddart (1942–2024), British chemist
- James Frazier (disambiguation)
