= William Frazer =

William Frazer may refer to:

- Willie Frazer (1960–2019), Loyalist campaigner from Northern Ireland
- Will Frazer, former coach of the Buchholz High School math team and current director of The Frazer School in Gainesville, Florida.
- William Frazer (sport shooter) (1884–1963), United States sportsman
- William C. Frazer (1776–1836), United States territorial judge
- William Miller Frazer (1864–1961), Scottish landscape painter
- William Frazer (Australian politician) for Electoral district of Creswick

== See also ==
- William Fraser (disambiguation)
- Willie Frazier, American football player
- Frazer Will, Canadian athlete
