= Charles Fraser (minister) =

New Zealand minister, educationalist and journalist

Charles Fraser (c. 1823 – 25 August 1886) was a New Zealand minister, educationalist and journalist. He was born in Aberdeen, Aberdeenshire, Scotland, in c. 1823.
