= Robert Henry Fraser =

New Zealand stained glass artist

Robert Henry Fraser (10 December 1869 – 30 May 1947) was a New Zealand stained glass artist. He was born in Dunedin, New Zealand on 10 December 1869.
