= Alexander V. Fraser =

1st Chief of the Revenue-Marine Bureau
- In office 1843–1848
- Preceded by: None
- Succeeded by: Captain Richard Evans, U. S. Revenue-Marine

Personal details
- Born: April 20, 1804 New York, New York
- Died: 1868 (aged 63–64) Brooklyn, New York
- Education: Mathematical, Nautical & Commercial School, New York
- Profession: Merchant seaman Marine insurance agent Revenue-Marine officer

Captain Alexander V. Fraser, U. S. Revenue-Marine, (April 20, 1804 – 1868) was an American seaman, who served as the first Chief of the Revenue-Marine Bureau, Department of the Treasury, one of the predecessor agencies of the United States Coast Guard.

== Biography ==
=== Early life and career ===
Fraser was born in New York City to a family of Scottish descent. After attending the Mathematical, Nautical and Commercial School in New York, he began his sea-faring career in the merchant service, in the East India trade. Fraser was a master mariner when he joined the Revenue-Marine in 1832, and was appointed second lieutenant of the cutter Alert, commanded by W. A. Hammond. Stationed at Charleston during the Nullification Crisis, Fraser's duty was to board ships bringing sugar from Cuba and collect import taxes. In 1836 he took leave of absence to command the merchant ship Himmaleh on a voyage to Japan, China and the Malay Archipelago.

After two years he returned to the Revenue-Marine and was appointed first lieutenant of Alert. By now Congress had passed a law (dated December 22, 1837) ordering the Revenue-Marine to render assistance to vessels in distress. In 1842 Fraser was appointed captain of the new cutter Ewing.

=== Chief of the Revenue Marine Bureau ===
On November 1, 1843 Secretary of the Treasury John C. Spencer created the Revenue-Marine Bureau to institute centralized control of the Revenue-Marine. (Previously cutters were controlled by the Collector of Customs at the port to which it was assigned.) Fraser was appointed the Bureau's first Chief. From his office at the Treasury Fraser was in charge of all financial, material and personnel matters concerning the service, with a single lieutenant to assist him. He promptly introduced a new system of promotion based on examination, and an increase in pay for non-commissioned and enlisted men. He also prohibited the use of slave labor, and the drinking of alcohol aboard revenue cutters. He also supported the building of iron-hulled steam vessels rather than wooden-hulled sailing ships.

In his first report of January 9, 1844 Fraser stated:

The principle advantages arising from the use of iron are; economy in the original construction; durability, lightness of material, and consequently, increased buoyancy; increased strength, particularly in the ability to withstand shocks sustained by taking the ground when passing shoal water bars; and the value when worn out, of the old materials.

In fact the Revenue-Marine had first requested the introduction of steam vessels in 1837, and had finally placed contracts for six steam cutters in 1840. The Legare and Jefferson were built to a design by John Ericsson using screw propellers, while the Spencer, Bibb, Dallas, and McLane were built using the Hunter Wheel design. None proved satisfactory, and the Walker and Polk, which followed in 1844 and 1845 were built using conventional side-wheel paddles. This experiment proved to be a failure as the ships proved to be expensive to build and maintain, slow, leaky and fuel-inefficient, and by 1852 all but three had been disposed of or transferred to the United States Coast Survey.

Fraser also made regular inspection tours to lighthouses and other aids to navigation, as well as the lifesaving stations. He also attempted to have the Revenue-Marine merged with the Life-Saving Service and the Lighthouse Board. (The Revenue Cutter Service was eventually merged with the Life-Saving Service on January 28, 1915, to form the United States Coast Guard.)

=== Later career ===
Fraser was eventually replaced as Chief of the Bureau by Captain Richard Evans on November 15, 1848. He then took command of the Revenue-Marine cutter Lawrence for a voyage around the Cape of Good Hope to San Francisco, California to enforce the revenue laws there. (Note: USRC Lawrence was sometimes referred to as USRC C.W. Lawrence; the source of her name is unclear. C.W. Lawrence was possibly Cornelius W. Lawrence, once the Collector of Customs of the Port Of New York) Despite many members of his crew deserting to take part in the Gold Rush, Fraser continued to carry out his duties of aiding distressed ships, collecting revenue, and surveying the ports and coast of California, until finally returning to New York in 1852.

In 1856, Fraser successfully lobbied for the building of a new steam-powered cutter, Harriet Lane, at New York, despite the previous failures. However this brought him into conflict with the Assistant Secretary of the Navy, who opposed the project, and he was removed from the service. He then became a marine insurance agent in New York.

Fraser attempted to rejoin the Revenue-Marine during the Civil War as President Lincoln signed a commission reinstating Fraser as a captain, however he was unable to serve. He died in Brooklyn in 1868.

== See also ==
- Commandant of the Coast Guard
- Californian, a replica of the USRC C. W. Lawrence

== Notes ==
Footnotes

Citations

References used

- "C. W. Lawrence, 1848" (PDF). Cutters, Craft & U.S. Coast Guard-Manned Army & Navy Vessels. U.S. Coast Guard Historian's Office.
- Canney, Donald L. (1995). U.S. Coast Guard and Revenue Cutters, 1790–1935. Naval Institute Press, Annapolis, Maryland. ISBN 978-1-55750-101-1.
