= Peter Fraser (disambiguation) =

Peter Fraser (1884–1950) was prime minister of New Zealand from 1940 to 1949.

Peter Fraser may also refer to:

== Politics ==
- Peter Fraser (merchant) (1765–1840), merchant and politician in New Brunswick
- Peter Gordon Fraser (1808–1888), Scottish public servant, later politician and artist in Van Diemen's Land
- Peter Fraser (Northwest Territories politician) (1921–2000), Canadian politician
- Peter Fraser, Baron Fraser of Carmyllie (1945–2013), Scottish politician and advocate

== Arts and culture ==
- Peter Fraser (1888–1950), cartoonist, book illustrator, and regular contributor to Punch magazine
- Peter Fraser (screenwriter) (Alexander Peter Fordham Watt, 1915–1965), British screenwriter, playwright and short story writer known for Dancing with Crime (1947)
- Peter Fraser (actor) (born 1932 or 1933), Scottish retired actor, known for Doctor Who: The Dalek Invasion of Earth (1964)
- Flip Fraser (Peter Randolph Fraser, 1951–2014), editor of The Voice and writer of the musical Black Heroes in the Hall of Fame

== Other ==
- Peter Fraser (athlete) (1913–1961), Welsh athlete
- Peter Fraser (classicist) (1918–2007), classical scholar
- Peter Fraser (photographer) (born 1953), British photographer
- Peter Fraser (judge) (born 1963), British barrister and judge
- Peter Fraser, fictional character in the Australian soap opera Home and Away
