= Harold Fraser =

Harry Fraser may refer to:

- Harold Fraser (cricketer) (1915–1993), Guyanese cricketer
- Harold Fraser (golfer) (1872–1945), American golfer
- Harold Fraser (weightlifter) (born 1937), South African weightlifter
- Harry Pollard (1889–1962), born Harold Fraser, best known as Snub Pollard, Australian-born silent movie comedian, popular in the 1920s
- Harold John Fraser (1893–1975), lawyer and politician in Saskatchewan, Canada
- Harold Livingstone Fraser (1890–1950), Australian aviator
- Harold Fraser-Simson (1872–1944), English composer

== See also ==
- Harry Fraser (disambiguation)
