= Ian Fraser (cricketer) =

New Zealand cricketer

Personal information
- Full name: Ian Comyn Fraser
- Born: 25 August 1902; Inverness, Scotland
- Died: 2 February 1990 (aged 87); Shrewsbury, England

Domestic team information
- Years: Team
- 1918/19: Otago
- Source: CricInfo, 10 May 2016

Ian Comyn Fraser (25 August 1902 – 2 February 1990) was a cricketer. He played one first-class match in New Zealand for Otago during the 1918–19 season.

Fraser was born ar Inverness in Scotland in 1902. He was educated at Otago Boys' High School and later qualified as a doctor. As well as cricket, Fraser played association football for Otago.
