= Scott Fraser =

Scott Fraser may refer to:

- Scott Fraser (footballer, born 1963), Scottish footballer (Rangers, Berwick Rangers)
- Scott Fraser (footballer, born 1995), Scottish footballer (Dundee United, Burton Albion, Charlton Athletic)
- Scott Fraser (ice hockey) (born 1972), retired ice hockey player
- Scott Fraser (politician), Canadian politician
- Scott E. Fraser, American biophysicist
- Scott Fraser (diplomat), Canadian ambassador to Finland
- Scott Fraser (orienteer) (born 1986), British orienteer
- Scott Fraser (racing driver) (1970–2004), Canadian racecar driver
