= Gordon Fraser =

Gordon Fraser may refer to:

- Gordon Fraser (cyclist) (born 1968), Canadian road bicycle racer
- Gord Fraser (ice hockey) (1902–1966), Canadian professional hockey player
- Gordon Fraser (publisher) (1911–1981), British publisher
- Gordon Fraser (politician) (1891–1960), Canadian Member of Parliament
- Gordon Fraser (footballer) (born 1943), Scottish footballer
