= Kathleen Fraser =

Kathleen Fraser may refer to:

- Kathleen Fraser (canoeist) (born 1986), Canadian sprint kayaker
- Kathleen Fraser (poet) (1935–2019), American poet
