= Gordon Frazer =

Australian electrical engineer

Gordon Frazer from the Defence Science and Technology Organisation, Edinburgh, Australia was named Fellow of the Institute of Electrical and Electronics Engineers (IEEE) in 2015 for contributions to advanced over-the-horizon radar.
