= David Fraser =

David Fraser may refer to:

- David Fraser (bowls) (1878–?), Scottish lawn bowler
- David Kennedy Fraser (1888–1962), Scottish psychologist, educator and amateur mathematician
- David Fraser (British Army officer) (1920–2012), British general and author
- David W. Fraser (born 1944), Swarthmore College president, epidemiologist and nonprofit leader
- David Fraser (Canadian general) (fl. 1980–2011), Canadian general
- David B. Fraser (fl. 2015), screenwriter and winner of the 2015 Canadian Screen Awards for The Captive
- David Fraser (footballer) (1937–2019), Scottish footballer
