= Keith Fraser =

Keith Fraser may refer to:

- Keith Fraser (footballer) (1913–2003), Australian rules footballer
- Sir Keith Fraser, 5th Baronet (1867–1935), British Member of Parliament for Harborough
- J. Keith Fraser (born 1922), Canadian physical geographer
- Keith Fraser (Bay Area sportsman) (born 1937), American fisherman
- Keith Fraser (skier) (born 1968), Scottish-born skier who represented Swaziland at the 1992 Winter Olympics
- Keith Fraser (police officer), Chair of the Youth Justice Board of England and Wales, and senior UK police officer
