= Rhoda Fraser =

Scottish communist and peace campaigner

- Born: Rhoda Jupp; 23 February 1918; Edinburgh
- Died: 9 March 1970 (aged 52); Edinburgh
- Other name: Crae Ritchie
- Years active: 1944–1969
- Known for: Communist organising, peace activist and poet

Rhoda Mary Napier Fraser (born Jupp; 23 February 1918 – 9 March 1970) was a Scottish communist and peace campaigner, known for her leading role in the Communist Party of Great Britain in the 1940s and 1950s, and her continuing public agitation in the 1960s against the Vietnam War and for nuclear disarmament. Under the pseudonym Crae Ritchie she was also a published poet.

== Early years ==
Fraser was born in Edinburgh to Ethel Jupp and her husband George, who was a clerk in the Board of Works in February 1918. She became a nurse. When the children's nursery in Glasgow that she was matron of was threatened with closure during WW2, she organised the mothers in a successful protest to keep it open.

== Political career ==
=== 1940s and 1950s ===
Fraser joined the Communist Party of Great Britain in her early 20s. In 1944, she became Scottish women's organiser and, later, secretary of the Scottish Women's Advisory Committee (SWAC). She campaigned on popular women's issues, including food prices, rents and childcare, and worked to make women a prominent feature of communist-backed demonstrations and pickets. Inspired by the World Congress for Peace in 1949, Fraser organised a 'peace bus' which toured Scotland during June of that year, alerting people to the dangers of nuclear warfare. The tour started with a send-off by Helen Crawfurd in her final public appearance.

Fraser wanted to build broad-based women's campaigns with a strong Communist influence, and in 1953 established Scotland's first national women's assembly, aimed towards "a united women's movement in Scotland". This brought her into conflict with the Scottish party leadership, who felt her priority should be building the CPGB's women's groups. In 1955, she was removed as secretary of the SWAC and left the Executive Committee.

A year later, Fraser left the Communist Party — not because of her disagreements with its Scottish leadership, but due to her disillusionment with the international communist movement after Khrushchev's secret speech and the 1956 Soviet invasion of Hungary.

=== 1960s ===
Fraser moved back to her hometown of Edinburgh in the 1960s and joined the Campaign for Nuclear Disarmament (CND). In 1969, as part of her campaigning against the Vietnam War, she interrupted a reception for the ambassador of South Vietnam to denounce his government.

== Poetry career ==
Writing as Crae Ritchie, Fraser had two books of poetry published, one posthumously. Her work was also published in journals and other outlets. She also used her work to raise funds for the causes she supported.

== Death ==
Following a struggle with major depressive disorder, Fraser took her own life in 1970. The following year, her friend and fellow poet, Joan Ure, published a poem about Fraser's death.
