= James Fraser younger of Belladrum =

Scottish slave owner (died 1832)

James Fraser younger of Belladrum (died 1832), also known as James Fraser 8th of Belladrum, was a Scottish slave owner.

He was one of three sons and three daughters of Colonel James Fraser (1732–1808), 7th of Belladrum, Scotland, and his wife Hannah Baillie, sister of Evan Baillie. Colonel Fraser had interests in Tobago by 1784. James Fraser was in Demerara before 1795. His brother Simon came to own two plantations in British Guiana; and his brother Evan owned an estate there in 1806.

Fraser was the co-owner of the Pin Dochfour plantation in Berbice from 1798 to 1803 with Edward Satchwell Fraser of Reelig, and the plantation Union from 1800 with William Fraser of Culbokie and Colin Mackenzie of Mountgerald. Fraser was also the owner and later co-owner of the Golden Fleece plantation from 1818 to 1831. In partnership with Reelig, Francis Mackenzie, 1st Baron Seaforth and William Munro he was further involved in the purchase of land on the east and west coasts of Berbice from the Dutch Society of Berbice. He was married to Mary Fraser (née Fraser of Achnagairn).

Fraser took one of his enslaved domestic workers, Archy, back to Britain with him, returning to Berbice in 1812 or 1813. In 1814 Archy was involved in a slave uprising.
