= Andrew Fraser =

Andrew Fraser is the name of:

== People ==
- Andrew Fraser, 3rd Lord Fraser, Lord Fraser
- Andrew Fraser, Baron Fraser of Corriegarth (1946–2021), a British former banker and Conservative politician
- Andrew Fraser (New South Wales politician) (born 1952), New South Wales Legislative Assembly member
- Andrew Fraser (Queensland politician) (born 1976), former Deputy Premier and Treasurer of Queensland
- Sir Andrew Henderson Leith Fraser (1848–1919), lieutenant-governor of Bengal, 1903–1908
- Andrew Fraser (lawyer), Australian lawyer imprisoned on drug charges
- Andy Fraser (1952–2015), English musician
- Drew Fraser (born 1944), Canadian-born Australian academic, law professor at Macquarie University in Sydney, New South Wales

== Fictional characters ==
- Andrew Fraser (Emmerdale), a fictional character from the ITV soap opera Emmerdale
- Andrew Fraser (First Among Equals), a fictional character from the novel First Among Equals by Jeffrey Archer

== See also ==
- Andrew Frazer (disambiguation)
