= Eric Fraser =

Eric Fraser may refer to:

- Eric Malcolm Fraser (1896–1960), Director-General at the British Ministry of Aircraft Production during the Second World War
- Eric Fraser (Canadian football) (born 1987), Canadian football player
- Eric Fraser (illustrator) (1902–1983), British illustrator and graphic artist
- Eric Fraser (rugby league) (1931–2000), English rugby league footballer
