= Bruce Fraser (author) =

Bruce Angus Fraser (9 January 1954 – 16 December 2006) was an author that specialized in digital color technology, including hardware and software for creating and managing color images and publications. He was a founding member of PixelGenius, LLC.

== Awards ==
Fraser received the first National Association of Photoshop Professionals (NAPP) Lifetime Achievement Award in 2006.

He also was inducted in the Photoshop Hall of Fame in 2006.

== Publications ==
- Many of Fraser's books were published by Peachpit Press.
- He was a contributing editor for Macworld and CreativePro.com.
