= Matthew Fraser =

Mat, Matt or Matthew Fraser may refer to:

- Mat Fraser (actor) (born 1962), English performance artist and rock musician
- Mat Fraser (athlete) (born 1990), American CrossFit Games winner
- Matt Fraser (born 1990), Canadian ice hockey player
- Matt Fraser (psychic) (born 1991), American medium
- Matthew Fraser (journalist) (born 1958), Canadian media academic and TV presenter
- Matthew Fraser, American student and plaintiff in the Supreme Court case Bethel School District v. Fraser

== See also ==
- Matt Frazer, American racing driver 98th in 2008 ASA Midwest Tour season
