= Barbara Wall Fraser =

American politician

Barbara Wall Fraser (born June 17, 1947) is a former American Democratic politician who served in the Missouri House of Representatives.

Born in Raleigh, North Carolina, she attended Meredith College, University of North Carolina at Chapel Hill, and Washington University in St. Louis. She previously worked as a high school history teacher and served as an elected member for the school board of University City, Missouri.
