= Charles Fraser (rugby union) =

Scotland international rugby union player & referee

- Born: Charles Frederick Pollock Fraser; 5 May 1868 Paisley, Renfrewshire, Scotland
- Died: 10 December 1916 (aged 48) Glasgow, Scotland

Rugby union career
- Position: Half back
Amateur team(s)
| Years | Team | Apps | (Points) |
- Glasgow University
| – | West of Scotland | | |
Provincial / State sides
| Years | Team | Apps | (Points) |
| 1885 | Glasgow District | | |
| 1886 | West of Scotland District | | |
International career
| Years | Team | Apps | (Points) |
| 1888-89 | Scotland | 2 | (0) |
Refereeing career
| Years | Competition | | Apps |
| 1895-98 | Scottish Unofficial Championship | | |

Charles Fraser (5 May 1868 – 10 December 1916) was a Scotland international rugby union player.

== Rugby Union career ==
=== Amateur career ===
He went to Glasgow University.

Fraser then played rugby union for Glasgow University. He captained the side.

He occasionally played for West of Scotland.

=== Provincial career ===
He played for Glasgow District in their inter-city match against Edinburgh District on 6 December 1885.

He played for West of Scotland District in their match against East of Scotland District on 30 January 1886.

=== International career ===
Fraser was capped 2 times by Scotland in the period 1888 to 1889.

=== Administrative career ===
He was one of Glasgow District's representatives on the Scottish Rugby Union board.

=== Refereeing career ===
He refereed Scottish Unofficial Championship matches.

== Other sports ==
He played cricket for Glasgow Academy, as well as Glasgow University.

He was a noted sprinter.

== Military career ==
He joined the 1st Lanarkshire Rifle Volunteers in 1897 as a 2nd Lieutanent.

== Law career ==
He became a solicitor.

== Family ==
He was the son of the Rev. Fraser of Paisley.

His brother M. P. Fraser was a well known Edinburgh advocate.

He married Janet Anderson.

== Death ==
His death was announced in the Daily Record newspaper of 12 December 1916 as 'suddenly, after an operation'.

He left an estate of £1434, 8 shillings and 6 pence.
