= Colin Fraser =

Colin Fraser may refer to:

- Colin Fraser (Australian politician) (died 1877), Australian politician
- Colin Fraser (Canadian politician) (born 1978), Canadian politician
- Colin Fraser (ice hockey) (born 1985), Canadian professional ice hockey player
- Colin Fraser (rugby league) (born 1963), Australian rugby league player
- Colin Fraser (mining) (1875–1944), mining engineer and executive
