= Bernie Fraser =

Bernie Fraser may refer to:

- Bernie Fraser (economist) (born 1941), Australian economist
- Bernie Fraser (rugby union) (born 1953), New Zealand rugby union player
