= Duncan Fraser =

Duncan Fraser may refer to:

- Duncan Fraser (moderator) (1903–1977), moderator of the General Assembly of the Church of Scotland
- Duncan Cameron Fraser (1845–1910), Canadian politician
- Duncan Fraser (actor), Canadian actor
- Duncan Fraser, a character in Best Friends Together
- Duncan Fraser, a character in Eliza Fraser
- Duncan & Fraser, a former vehicle manufacturer in Australia
