= Sean Fraser =

Sean Fraser may refer to:

- Sean Fraser (politician) (born 1984), Canadian politician from Nova Scotia
- Sean Fraser (soccer) (born 1980), former Canadian soccer player
- Sean Fraser (Jamaican footballer) (born 1983), Jamaican association football player
- Sean Fraser (swimmer), Scottish swimmer
- Shaune Fraser (born 1988), a Cayman Islands swimmer
