= James Oliphant Fraser =

Newfoundland politician (1826–1904)

The Honourable James O. Fraser MLC MHA
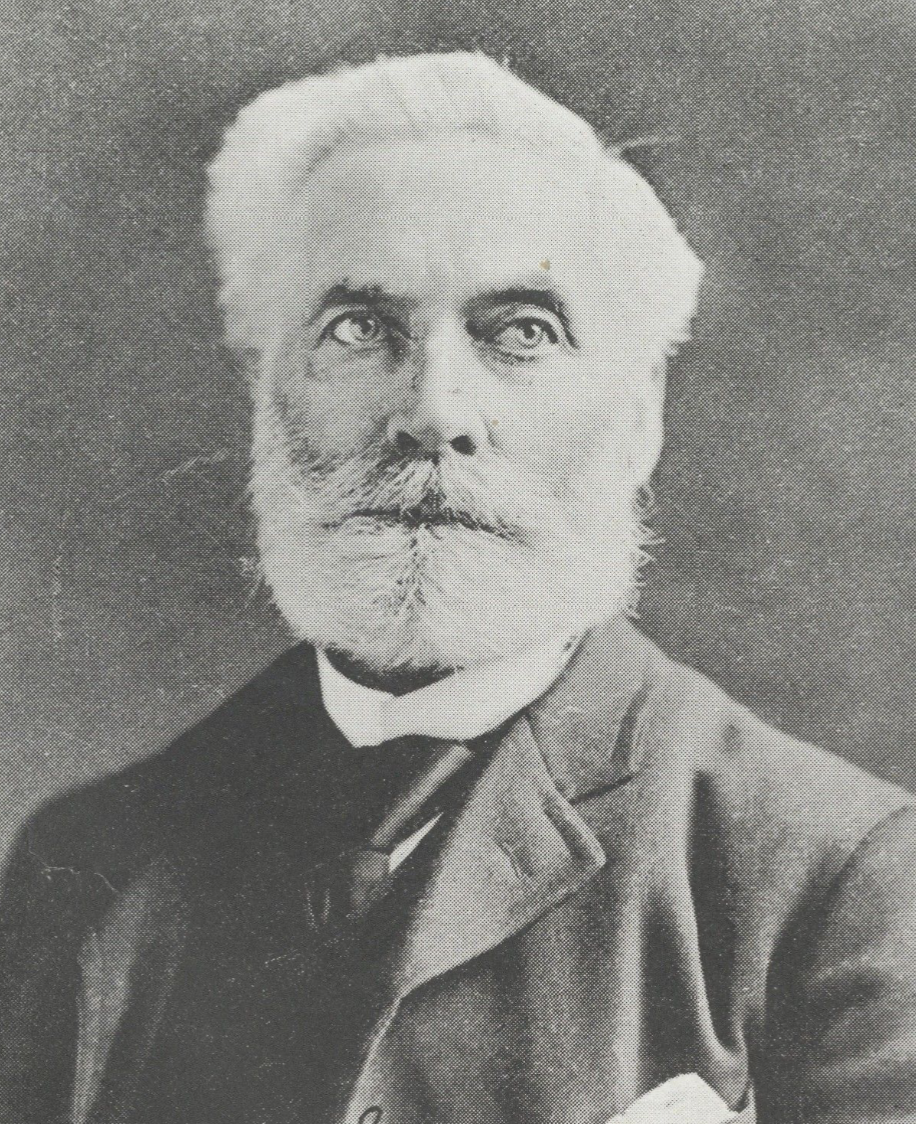
- Fraser in 1894

Postmaster General of Newfoundland
- In office 1885–1902
- Premier: Robert Thorburn; William Whiteway; Augustus Goodridge; Daniel Greene; Robert Bond
- Preceded by: John Delaney
- Succeeded by: Henry J. B. Woods

Surveyor General
- In office 1882–1885
- Premier: William Whiteway
- Preceded by: William Donnelly
- Succeeded by: Alfred Penney

Member of the Newfoundland House of Assembly for Fortune Bay
- In office November 9, 1878 – October 31, 1885
- Preceded by: Robert Alexander
- Succeeded by: Robert Bond

Member of the Legislative Council of Newfoundland
- In office 1864–1878
- Appointed by: Hugh Hoyles

Personal details
- Born: October 2, 1826 Saint John, New Brunswick
- Died: February 14, 1904 (aged 77) St. John's, Newfoundland Colony
- Spouse: Eliza Ewing (m. 1853)
- Children: James Oliphant Fraser Jr.
- Relatives: Donald Allan Fraser (father)
- Occupation: Businessman

James Oliphant Fraser (October 2, 1826 – February 14, 1904) was a businessman and political figure in Newfoundland. He represented Fortune Bay in the Newfoundland and Labrador House of Assembly from 1878 to 1885.

== Early life, business career, and politics ==
Fraser was born on October 2, 1826 in Saint John, New Brunswick as one of ten sons and eleven children of Presbyterian minister Donald Allan Fraser and Catherine (née McLean). The family moved to St. John's, Newfoundland in 1842 when Rev. Fraser took up his post as the colony's first Presbyterian minister. Initially finding employment with Rennie, Stewart and Co., Fraser established his own business in St. John's in 1846. He was a member of the Legislative Council of Newfoundland from 1864 to 1878. He served as chairman of the Board of Works from 1879 to 1882 and as surveyor general from 1882 to 1885. After he retired from politics, Fraser was Postmaster General from 1885 to 1902. He died in St. John's at the age of 77.

His son James Oliphant Fraser, Jr. also served in the Newfoundland assembly.
