= Malcolm Fraser (disambiguation) =

Malcolm Fraser (1930–2015) was an Australian politician who served as Prime Minister of Australia from 1975 to 1983.

Malcolm Fraser may also refer to:

- Sir Malcolm Fraser (surveyor) (1834–1900), British surveyor and administrator in Australia
- Malcolm Fraser (artist) (1868–1949), Canadian-born artist and illustrator
- Malcolm Fraser (statistician) (1872–1949), New Zealand government statistician
- Sir Malcolm Fraser, 1st Baronet (1878–1949), British newspaper editor and political agent
- Malcolm Fraser (philanthropist) (1903–1994), American philanthropist and businessman who founded the Genuine Parts Company and the Stuttering Foundation of America
- Malcolm Fraser (architect) (born 1959), founder of Malcolm Fraser Architects
- Eadie Fraser (1860–1886), full name Malcolm James Eadie Fraser, Scottish footballer
