= Ian Frazer (cricketer) =

Personal information
- Full name: Ian Douglas Frazer
- Born: 7 September 1966 (age 60)
- Batting: left-handed
- Role: batsman

Domestic team information
- Years: Team
- 1986/87–1989/90: Victoria

Career statistics
Competition	First-class	List A
Matches	17	2
Runs scored	758	52
Batting average	26.13	26.00
100s/50s	0/6	0/0
Top score	90	47
Catches/stumpings	9/–	0/–
- Source: ESPNcricinfo, 6 March 2014

Ian Douglas Frazer (born 7 September 1966) is an Australian cricket coach, sports scientist and biomechanist. He played first-class cricket from 1986 to 1990. In 2005, Frazer was appointed assistant team coach and biomechanist for India's national team, working with head coach Greg Chappell. They both resigned in 2007.

== Biography ==
Ian Douglas Frazer was born in Lilydale, Victoria, a suburb of Melbourne, on 7 September 1966. Having been a student at the Commonwealth Bank Cricket Academy, he began playing first-class and List A cricket for Victoria in 1986 as a left-handed batsman; his career lasted until 1990. After the end of his playing career, Frazer worked for some time in business and computing technology, before collaborating with Greg Chappell to develop a cricket training programme called "The Chappell Way".

== Stint with India ==
In 2005, Chappell was appointed head coach of the Indian team, and chose Frazer as both his assistant and the team's biomechanist. Frazer enforced Chappell's training regime to increase the physical fitness of the players, and defended Chappell against criticism by the media. Frazer emphasised the introduction of younger players into the national team to replace older, more experienced veterans.

Although he was praised by some players, Frazer was criticised in the media because of the perceived ambiguity of his role. Chappell insisted that Frazer's involvement was important for his coaching vision, but critics accused them of doing no more than conducting basic training practice. Calls increased for the appointment of a specialist bowling coach. Among the criticisms was Frazer's lacklustre first-class playing credentials, which were cited as insufficient. Frazer resigned, along with Chappell, after India's poor performance in the 2007 Cricket World Cup.

== See also ==
- List of Victoria first-class cricketers
