= Richard Fraser of Touchfraser =

13th-14th century Scottish noble

Sir Richard Fraser was a Scottish noble of the late thirteenth and early fourteenth centuries. He succeeded to the lands of Touchfraser (or Tulchfraser) in Stirlingshire upon the death of his grandfather, Sir Gilbert Fraser (d. c 1263).

== Life ==
The son of John Fraser of Touchfraser and Alicia de Conigburg, Sir Richard Fraser first appears in the records when he served as a witness to the resignation of Pencaitland in East Lothian from John de Pencaitland to Herbert de Maxwell in 1276 at which time he is recorded as having the rank of miles (knight). In 1289, he, along with his cousin Sir Simon Fraser, Sir John de Lindesay, and several monks and clergy, was sent to Carham on Tweed to a court hearing ordered by England’s King Edward I. At issue was the justice of a claim made by a merchant of Gascony that King Alexander III of Scotland had died greatly indebted to him.

In the interregnum following the death of Margaret, Maid of Norway, in 1290, Sir Richard, like all Frasers of the period, supported John Balliol. On 8 July 1291 Sir Richard swore fealty to Edward I, who appointed him one of the auditors of the pleadings presented by the various competitors to the Scottish crown, which was ultimately awarded to Balliol. The following year on two occasions, Sir Richard was among the witnesses when Balliol paid homage to Edward: the first at Norham on 20 November 1292, and the second at Newcastle upon Tyne on 26 December.

At about the same time, on 14 November, Edward granted Sir Richard the wardship of the lands of the late Richard de Glen in Peeblesshire, including the maritagium, that is, the right to determine the marriage of the heir, Richard, son of Duncan de Glen. For this privilege, Fraser paid 100 merks in four installments of 25 each. Balliol appointed Fraser vicecomes (sheriff) of Berwick in 1293. In 1296, when Balliol and Edward quarreled over the status of William Thorold, an English malefactor who had fled to Scotland. In negotiations with his English counterpart, the sheriff of Northumberland, Sir Richard dissembled, saying he could not rightly judge the matter as he had not held his office long enough to know what Balliol would have him do. As a consequence, Edward stripped Richard of his lands in Peeblesshire. Though Sir Richard was reportedly taken prisoner when Edward besieged Berwick Castle on Good Friday, his lands were restored when he submitted to Edward on 3 September.

At Berwick, on 28 August 1296, Sir Richard swore an oath of loyalty to Edward I for his lands in Stirlingshire and Dumfriesshire. He is not believed to have been one of the Scots carried to England after the Battle of Dunbar, for, while the captive barons were forced to serve Edward in his war with France in May 1297, Fraser, by contrast, was sent an invitation to serve. He then stood as surety for his cousin, Sir Simon Fraser, one of the captive Scots, when the two were at Bamburgh Castle in Northumberland on 28 May.

It is unclear whether Sir Richard actually took part in the expedition, because on 26 September he was among the barons summoned to assist Bryan Fitzallan against William Wallace. In 1306, he apparently fought for Robert the Bruce at the Battle of Methven, for it is known that various English soldiers sought possession of lands confiscated from him in the aftermath. Specifically, John de Luc asked for the lands of Tulchfraser in Stirling; John de Bristow requested lands in Dumfries; and Alexander de Balliol also put in a request.

The last mention of Sir Richard in the historical record is in 1307 when he communicated with Edward I to recover expenses for his guardianship of Richard de Glen, the son of Duncan de Glen. However, Edward refused his request, calling him a rebel. It is not known whether Fraser married or when and where he died.

Arms of Richard Fraser of Touchfraser: Azure, six cinquefoils argent, 3, 2, and 1.

His seal bore on a triangular shield six rosettes or cinquefoils 3, 2, and 1.

== Descendants ==
He is thought to have had one son, Andrew Fraser (d. ante 1297). His grandsons were Sir Alexander Fraser (d. 1332), who inherited Richard’s lands of Touchfraser and from whom came the Frasers of Philorth, Lords Saltoun; Sir Simon Fraser (d. 1333), from whom came the Frasers of Lovat, Lords Lovat; Sir Andrew Fraser (d. 1333); and Sir James Fraser, 1st of Frendraught (d. 1333).

== Legacy ==
Alexander Fraser, 18th (traditionally 17th) Baron Saltoun, lamented in 1879 that Sir Richard Fraser had not been given “the very high rank in the family that the account of his career, meagre as the record may be, shows him to have held.”
