= Harry Fraser =

Harry Fraser may refer to:

- Harry W. Fraser (1884–1950), American railway labor leader
- Harry Fraser (director) (1889–1974), American film director and screenplay writer

== See also ==
- Harold Fraser (disambiguation)
- Henry Fraser (disambiguation)
