= Ronald Fraser =

Ronald Fraser may refer to:

- Ronald Fraser (actor), (1930–1997), Scottish actor
- Ronald Fraser (historian), (1930–2012), British historian
- Ron Fraser (1933–2013), American college baseball coach
- Ronnie Fraser (1929–2010), Scottish journalist and politician
- Ron Frazer (1924–1983), Australian actor, comedian, and screenwriter
