= Flora Fraser =

Flora Fraser may refer to:

- Flora Fraser (writer)
- Flora Fraser, 21st Lady Saltoun
