= Christine Marion Fraser =

Scottish author

Christine Marion Fraser (24 March 1938 – 22 November 2002) was a Scottish author of popular fiction.

== Background ==
She was born in Govan, Glasgow, and was raised in a tenement, the eighth child of a shipyard worker and his wife. As a child, she developed a calcium condition and became a wheelchair user for life.

== Works ==
Fraser was best known for her four continuing family sagas, all of them set in Scotland. Her books sold over three and a half million copies, mostly in her native Scotland but also across the English-speaking world.

Her first novel Rhanna was published in 1978 and was followed by seven sequels. The Rhanna series detailed the lives of the residents of a small fictitious Hebridean island of the same name.

Her second series was the five-book King's Croft series, begun in 1986, which was set in 19th century Aberdeenshire. She followed that in 1994 with the Noble series, set in Victorian-era Argyll.

Her fourth and final series, begun in 1998, were the Kinvara stories, four novels about lighthouse keepers on an Outer Hebridean island.

She also wrote a series of autobiographical novels related to her life and upbringing in Scotland.

== Bibliography ==
=== Rhanna ===
- Rhanna (1978)
- Rhanna at War (1980)
- Children of Rhanna (1983)
- Return to Rhanna (1984)
- Song of Rhanna (1985)
- Storm Over Rhanna (1988)
- Stranger on Rhanna (1992)
- A Rhanna Mystery (1996)

=== Kings ===
- King's Croft (1986)
- King's Acre (1987)
- King's Exile(1989)
- King's Close (1991)
- King's Farewell (1993)

=== Noble ===
- Noble Beginnings (1994)
- Noble Deeds (1995)
- Noble Seed (1997)

=== Kinvara ===
- Kinvara (1998)
- Kinvara Wives (1999)
- Kinvara Summer (2000)
- Kinvara Affairs (2001)

=== Autobiographical series ===
- Blue Above the Chimneys (1980)
- Roses Round the Door (1986)
- Green Are My Mountains (1990)
- Beyond the Rainbow (1994)

=== Other work ===
- Ullin Macbeth (1996)
- The Poppy Field (1997) (with Frank Ian Galloway)
- Out of the Past (1997)
- Wild Is the Day (1997)
