= Little Lon district =

Slum and red light district in Melbourne, Victoria, Australia

Little Lon was the popular name for a slum and red-light district in Melbourne, Australia.

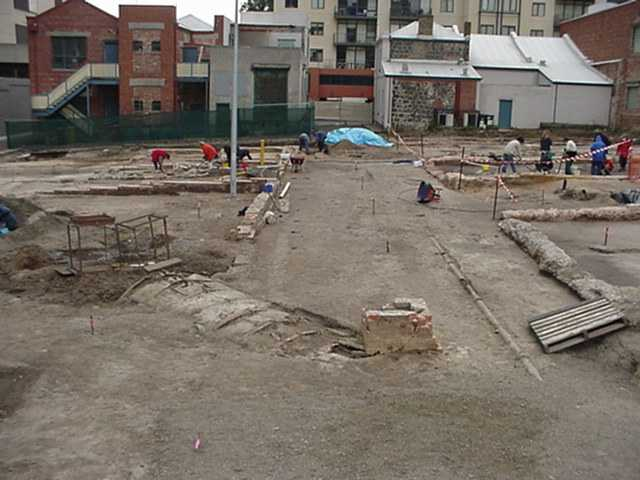
Archaeologists at work amongst building footings at Little Lon, in 2002.

The area was roughly bounded by Lonsdale, Spring, Stephen (later Exhibition) and La Trobe streets. Little Lonsdale Street itself ran through the block, and the area was further divided by numerous narrow laneways. In the nineteenth century the area consisted of timber and brick cottages, shops and small factories and was home to an ethnically diverse and generally poor population. Today there are few reminders of the area's former notoriety.

== Prostitution, petty crime and larrikinism ==
Archaeologist Justin McCarthy suggests that by 1854, only twenty years after Melbourne was established as a city, the area was well established as a notorious "red light" and slum district. It was associated with prostitution, petty crime and larrikinism. The numerous narrow back alleys and small cottages of this area housed, by this time, a growing number of prostitutes, The Argus newspaper at the time complaining of "females of the lowest and most disreputable class, who pursued their calling with the lowest and most filthy language and conduct." Prostitution was linked with "larrikinism" in official reports, as in the following description of the corner of Little Lonsdale and Leichardt Street from 1882:

From 11 o'clock in the forenoon till 3 or 4 next morning - there is fully thirty larrikins from 14-22 years of age...[that] live entirely on their prostitutes... they watch during the night for men intoxicated to rob them...they know the time the police is due [so] they disperse until they pass.

In 1891, Melbourne city's back slums were described by evangelist Henry Varley as "a loathsome centre in which crime, gambling hells, opium dens and degraded Chinese abound, and where hundred of licentious and horribly debased men and women are herded like swine". These places were "a disgrace to any civilized city on earth." Fergus Hume's immensely popular The Mystery of a Hansom Cab, written in 1887, described life in a slum in the nearby lanes behind Little Bourke Street, as exposed by its middle class heroes. Writing in 1915, C. J. Dennis's humorous novel The Songs of a Sentimental Bloke spoke of the "low, degraded broots" (brutes) of Little Lon.

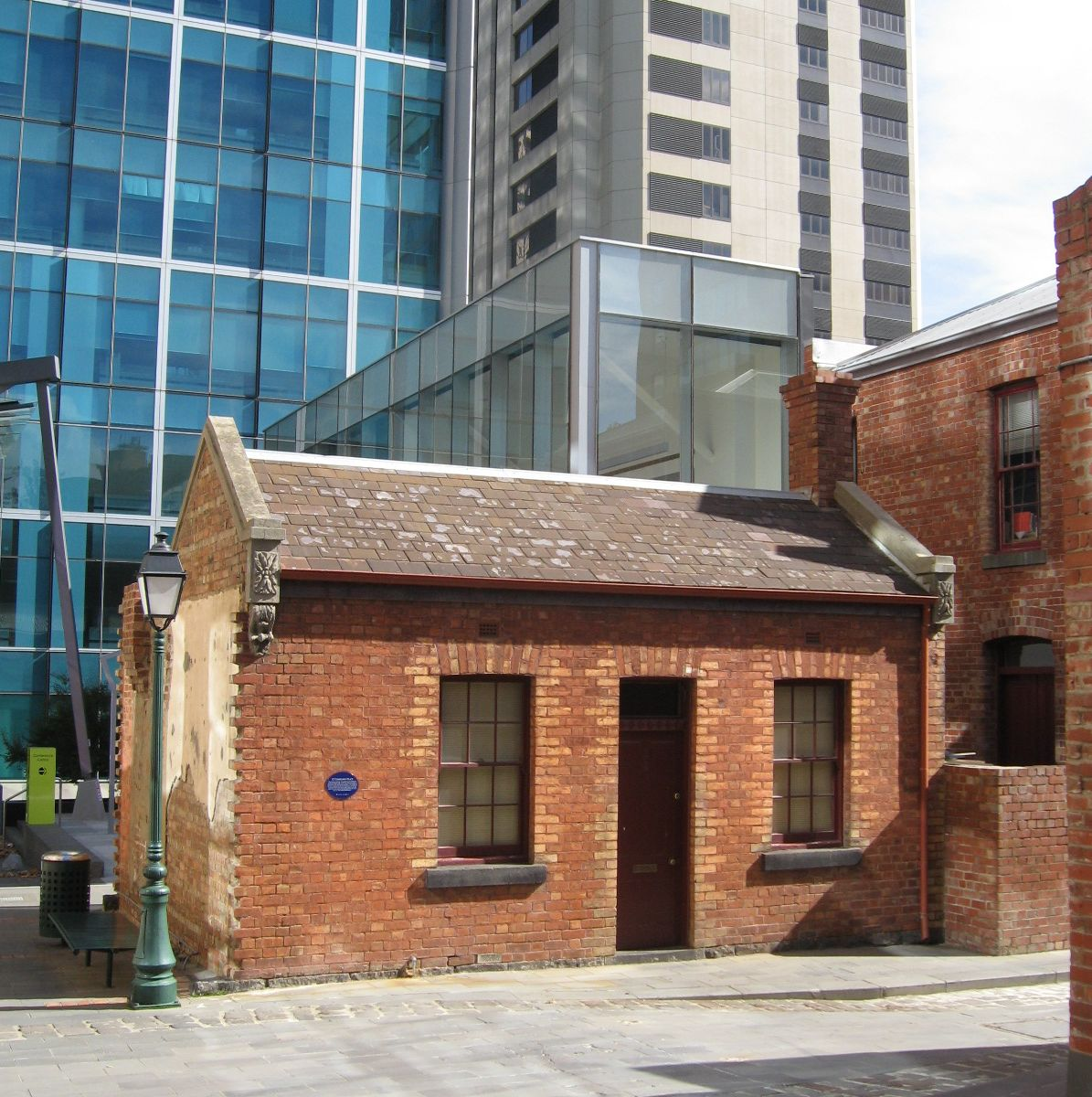
A former house built in 1877 at 17 Casselden Place. Originally part of a terrace of six dwellings

Little Lon's most opulent brothels tended to face main streets, but were discreetly run. "Disorderly" or "low class" brothels tended to be in the narrower laneways behind. Tobacconists, confectionery, cigar and fruit shops in the area also sometimes acted as fronts for prostitution. In the small houses of the laneways, single or small groups of prostitutes also ran the most primitive cottage brothels. For example, the still extant Number 17 Casselden Place was operated by a single Chinese prostitute known as "Yokohama" (Tiecome Ah Chung) as late as the 1920s.

"Madam Brussels", facing Lonsdale Street, attracted a wealthy class of clientele, and consequently also greater notoriety, although prostitution itself was not illegal in 19th century Victoria. In 1878 a Select Committee Report on the Prevention of Contagious Diseases included the following evidence about Madam Brussel's brothel at 32-34 Lonsdale Street, from Sergeant James Dalton:

Q. How many brothels does Mrs B. keep? A. She has two splendid houses in [Lonsdale] Street that cost her £1,300, and those two houses are her own property… and then she has two cottages in – Street and she has …in – Street too.

Madam Brussels was far from the only elite brothel in the area. In 1867 Police Commissioner Standish introduced the visiting Prince Alfred, Duke of Edinburgh, to a brothel run in Stephen Street by Sarah Fraser. Other "orderly" brothels also included those of "Scotch Maude" and Biddy O’Connor.

In October 1891, the mace of the Victorian parliament was stolen. It was claimed that it had found its way to Annie Wilson's "Boccaccio House", in the Little Lon district, where it was supposedly used in a mock parliament. It was not recovered. The connection between Victoria's politicians and the brothels of Little Lon was reinforced when Chief Secretary Sir Samuel Gillott was revealed to have had ongoing financial dealings with Madam Brussels.

== Understanding the people of Little Lon ==
Recent writers have emphasized the vibrancy and complexity of Little Lon's population of migrants and itinerant workers, and challenged the stereotype of the area as a miserable slum. This also seems to have been born out by the major archaeological studies conducted in the area in 1988 and 2002, which discovered a wide variety of objects from abandoned cesspits and rubbish dumps. Many were typical of domestic use in the nineteenth century, but a number gave indications of a flourishing community and occasionally, prosperity. Dr. Alan Mayne has commented; "Little Lon was clearly not, as the slummer genre would have it, an unstable mishmash of listless and directionless deviants. Nor were its inhabitants passive victims to poverty." By the end of the nineteenth century, the area had become home to a diverse migrant population of Chinese, German Jews, Lebanese and Italians.

== Changes in the early twentieth century ==
Leanne Robinson comments that in the early twentieth century the Little Lon district began to change significantly. Newspapers had increasingly demanded a cleanup of the area, John Norton's The Truth being particularly vocal in its attacks, especially on Madam Brussels, the "queen of harlotry." Workshops and small factories increasingly took over the area. Many of the hotels and brothels were gradually being demolished and "prostitutes found themselves forced into... areas such as Gore Street and the notorious 'Narrows' around the Fitzroy Town Hall" Policemen had greater powers and prostitutes were subject to new laws. Around 1914, the buildings between 6 and 34 Lonsdale street, including Madam Brussels former brothel (which had closed in 1907) were demolished and replaced by small factories.

However, people continued to live in the area until the 1950s, when much of the district was compulsorily acquired for redevelopment by the Federal Government. In the early 1990s, a former resident of the Little Lon district was interviewed. Marie Hayes lived in her parents' home in Cumberland Place (in the northern half of the district) until she married in 1940. She reported that later in life, her mother Bridget said of Little Lon

This area used to have a bad name. Some of these streets were not pleasant, but everyone has always been kind to us. No one has ever molested us, or even made us afraid. When you have lived so long in the heart of the city, you want to stay here always.

== The area today ==
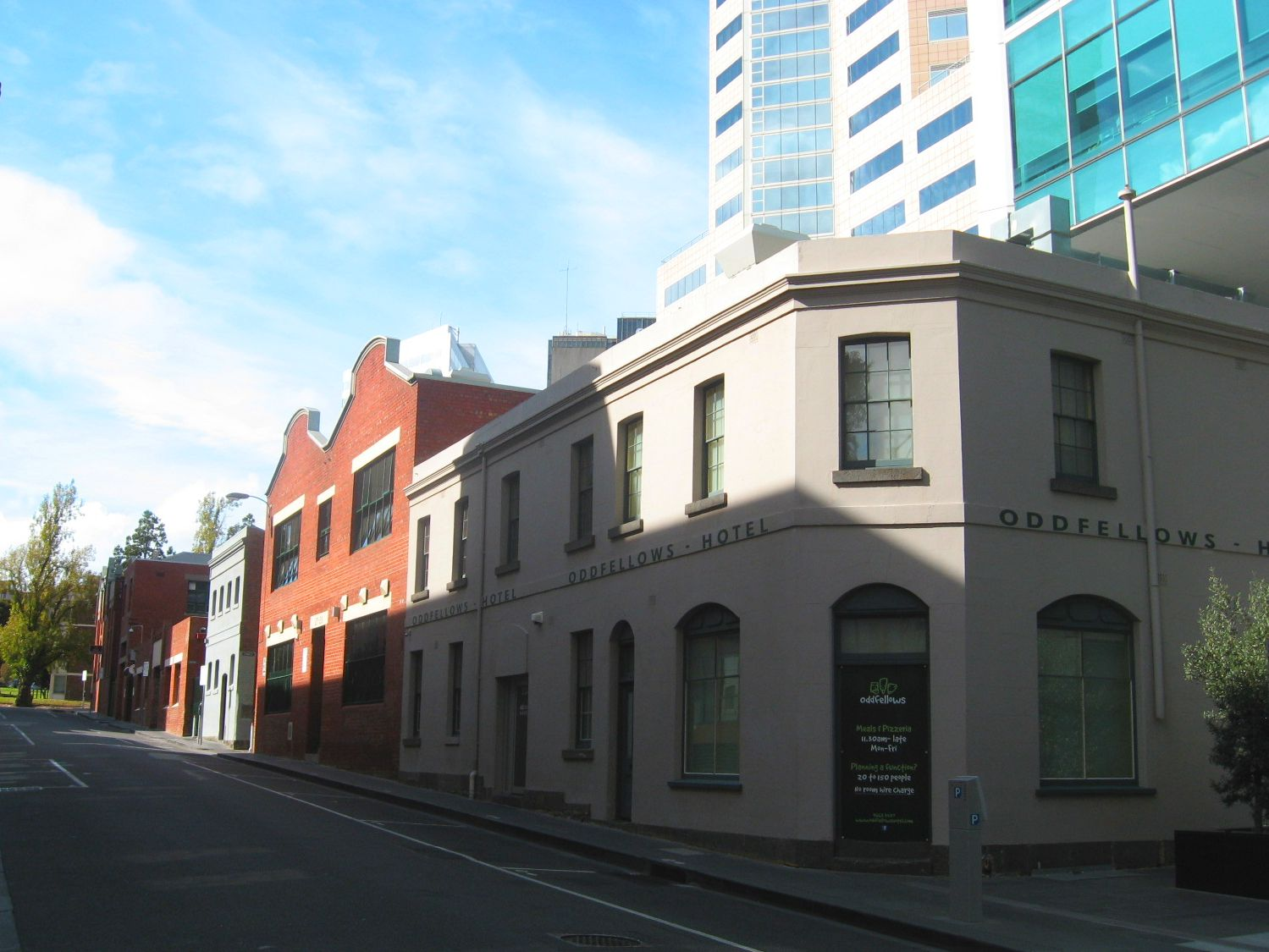
The Oddfellows Hotel, built in 1853, on the corner of Little Lonsdale Street and "Madam Brussels Lane" (Little Leichardt Street)

In the northern half of the district, all buildings and streets were demolished in the late 1950s to make way for Commonwealth buildings. Today, only a few nineteenth century buildings survive in the southern half of the area. These include

- 17 Casselden Place, a former house built in 1877. Typical of cottages built in the mid nineteenth century and originally one of a terrace of six. This is the only nineteenth century single story dwelling in the area to survive.
- Oddfellows Hotel, built c.1853 at 35-9 Little Lonsdale Street. Although now a licensed premises, this building has had a number of uses, including a Chinese furniture maker's factory.
- Black Eagle Hotel built c.1850 at 42-4 Lonsdale Street, now a shop.
- Factory at 25 Little Lonsdale Street. A former shop and forge, built about 1868 for engineer Alexander Lugton. This is one of few surviving examples of the small businesses that operated in the area in the nineteenth century. The company expanded in the late nineteenth century and eventually took over a number of buildings in the district.
- Elms Family Hotel, on the corner of Spring Street and Little Lonsdale Street. This is the only commercial business in the area that has operated continuously on the same spot in the district since the mid nineteenth century, although the building has been remodeled. The hotel ceased operation in 2016.
- Church of England Mission building, next to the Elms Family Hotel, one of a number built in the district by Church missions to cater for local residents.
- 118-162 Little Lonsdale Street, 100 metres west of the area. A small streetscape of former shops and dwellings between Exploration lane and Bennetts Lane, that most resembles the Little Lon of the nineteenth century.

Several other buildings in the district have been redeveloped or incorporated into modern office blocks.

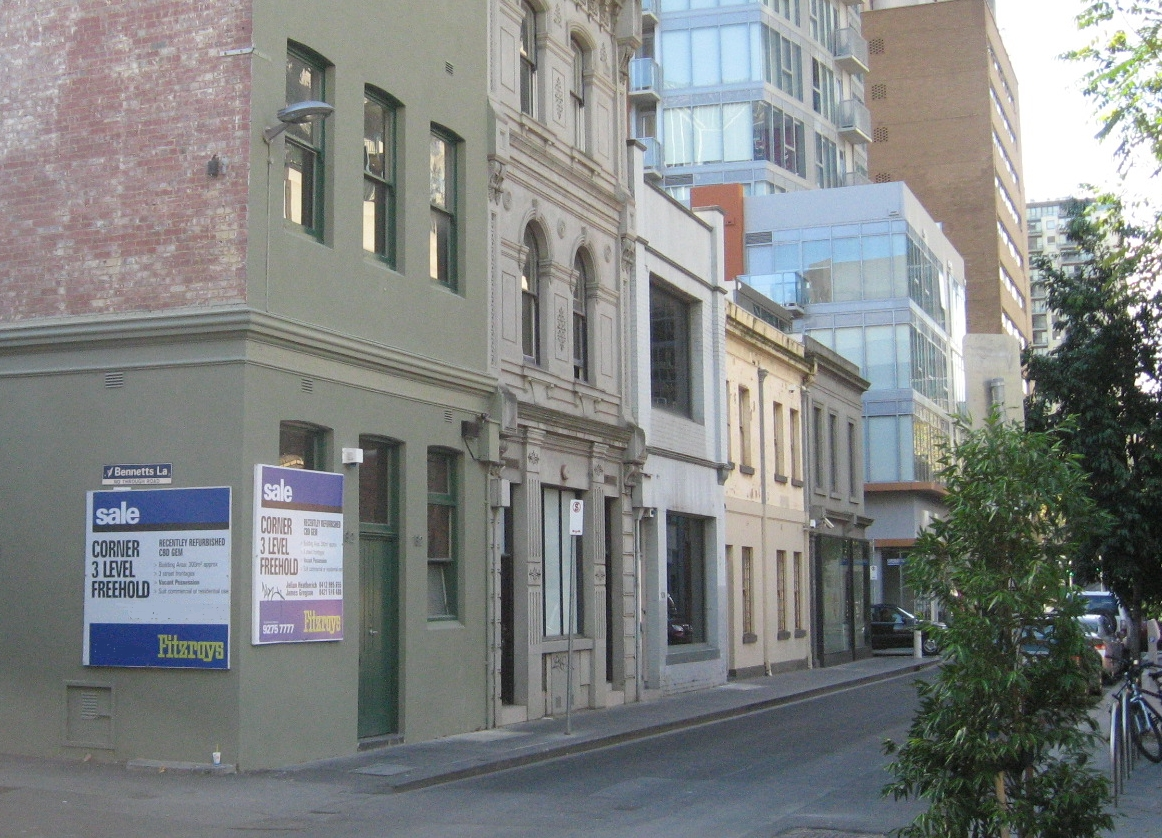
Buildings in Little Lonsdale Street, numbers 118-162, between Exploration Lane and Bennetts Lane.

These include

- "P.N.Hong Nam" Building at 268 Exhibition Street. This was built as a factory and shop c.1910.
- "Khyat and Co" Building at 76 Lonsdale Street. Built as a factory in 1922.
- "Coopers Hotel" at 282 Exhibition Street. Originally built as a hotel for James Cooper in the 1850s, but later delicensed. The building served as a Mission building, a home for girls, and later a post office before being reopened as a hotel.

Major archeological digs were conducted in the area in 1988 and 2002. Many of the objects uncovered are on display at Museum Victoria in a recreated "Little Lon" streetscape.

== See also ==
- Geography of Melbourne
