= Mark Fraser =

Mark Fraser may refer to:

- Mark Fraser (footballer, born 1971), Australian rules footballer and umpire
- Mark Fraser (footballer, born 1959), Australian rules footballer for South Melbourne
- Mark Fraser (ice hockey) (born 1986), Canadian ice hockey player
- Mark Fraser (secretary), Australian general secretary
