= Helen Fraser =

Helen Fraser may refer to:

- Helen Fraser (actress) (1942–2026), English actress
- Helen Fraser (executive) (born 1949), British executive and businesswoman
- Helen Fraser (feminist) (1881–1979), Scottish suffragist, feminist, educationalist and politician
