= Allan Fraser =

Allan or Alan Fraser may refer to:

- Allan Fraser (Australian politician) (1902–1977)
- Allan Fraser (musician) (born 1948), Canadian folk musician and songwriter
- Allan Fraser (Canadian politician) (1906–1969)
- Allan Fraser (footballer) (born 1982), Scottish footballer in Hong Kong
- Allen Fraser (New York politician) in 44th New York State Legislature
- Alan Fraser (cricketer) (1892–1962), Scottish cricketer

== See also ==
- Alan Fraser Davies (1924–1987), Australian political scientist and author
