= Iain Fraser =

Iain Fraser may refer to:

- Iain Fraser (ice hockey) (born 1969), NHL ice hockey player
- Iain Fraser (soccer) (born 1964), former Canadian international

== See also ==
- Ian Fraser (disambiguation)
