= Simon Fraser =

Simon Fraser may refer to:

== Arts and entertainment ==
- Simon Fraser (musician) (1772/3–1852), Scottish musician
- Simon Alexander Fraser (1845–1934), Australian bagpiper
- Simon Fraser (comics), British comic artist

== Law and politics ==
- Simon Fraser (Queensland politician) (1824–1889), Australian politician
- Sir Simon Fraser (Australian politician) (1832–1919)
- Sir Simon Fraser (diplomat) (born 1958), British diplomat

== Military ==
- Sir Simon Fraser (d. 1306), Scottish knight
- Simon Fraser of Lovat (1726–1782), British general and Jacobite leader
- Simon Fraser of Balnain (1729–1777), British general
- Simon Fraser, the younger of Lovat (1765–1803), Scottish military commander

== Nobility ==
- Simon Fraser, 1st Laird of Lovat (died 1333)
- Simon Fraser, 6th Lord Lovat (1572–1633)
- Simon Fraser, 11th Lord Lovat (1667–1747)
- Simon Fraser, 13th Lord Lovat (1828–1887)
- Simon Fraser, 14th Lord Lovat (1871–1933)
- Simon Fraser, 15th Lord Lovat (1911–1995)
- Simon Fraser, Master of Lovat (1939–1994)
- Simon Fraser, 16th Lord Lovat (born 1977)

== Others ==
- Simon Fraser (explorer) (1776–1862), Canadian explorer
- Simon Fraser (Australian sportsman) (1886–1919), Australian rules footballer and rower
- Simon Fraser (American football) (born 1983), American football defensive end

== Other uses ==
- Simon Fraser University, Canadian university
- CCGS Simon Fraser, Canadian Coast Guard buoy tender
