= Bill Fraser (ice hockey) =

Canadian ice hockey and soccer player

- Born: January 31, 1916 Winnipeg, Manitoba, Canada
- Died: January 15, 1997 (aged 81)
- Height: 6 ft 1 in (185 cm)
- Weight: 197 lb (89 kg; 14 st 1 lb)
- Position: Goalie
- Played for: Weyburn Beavers; Buffalo Bisons; Ottawa Senators
- Playing career: 1937–1952

William Fraser (January 31, 1916 – January 15, 1997) was a Canadian athlete who played as an ice hockey goaltender and a centre half in soccer.

== Early life ==
Fraser was born in Winnipeg. He played junior hockey for the Winnipeg Maple Leafs before playing for Winnipeg CNR and the Weyburn Beavers. He then moved to Nova Scotia where he played for Sydney and Glace Bay before switching to the Quebec league where he played for the Montreal Sr. Canadiens.

== Career ==
Fraser played for the Buffalo Bisons before joining the Ottawa Senators' senior team where he played from 1945 to 1952.

In soccer, he initially played as a centre forward. In 1939, he helped Winnipeg Irish win the Manitoba Cup and reach the semi-finals of the Canadian National Championships. He then played for Dome Mines in 1940. He then helped Winnipeg Scottish FC win Manitoba Cup provincial titles in 1947, 1949, 1950 and 1951. The team were eliminated in the national semi-finals in 1949 and 1951, but reached the final in both 1947 and 1950.

Alongside hockey and soccer, he also played softball as a second baseman. After retiring as an athlete, Fraser worked as a head coach in the Saskatchewan Junior Hockey League with the Melville Millionaires, Prince Albert Mintos and Moose Jaw Canucks.

== Awards and achievements ==
- MJHL Championship (1936)
- Allan Cup Championship (1949)
- "Honoured Member" of the Manitoba Hockey Hall of Fame
- Manitoba Cup soccer Championship (1939, 1947, 1949, 1950, 1951)
