= Douglas M. Fraser =

US Air Force general

General Douglas M. Fraser
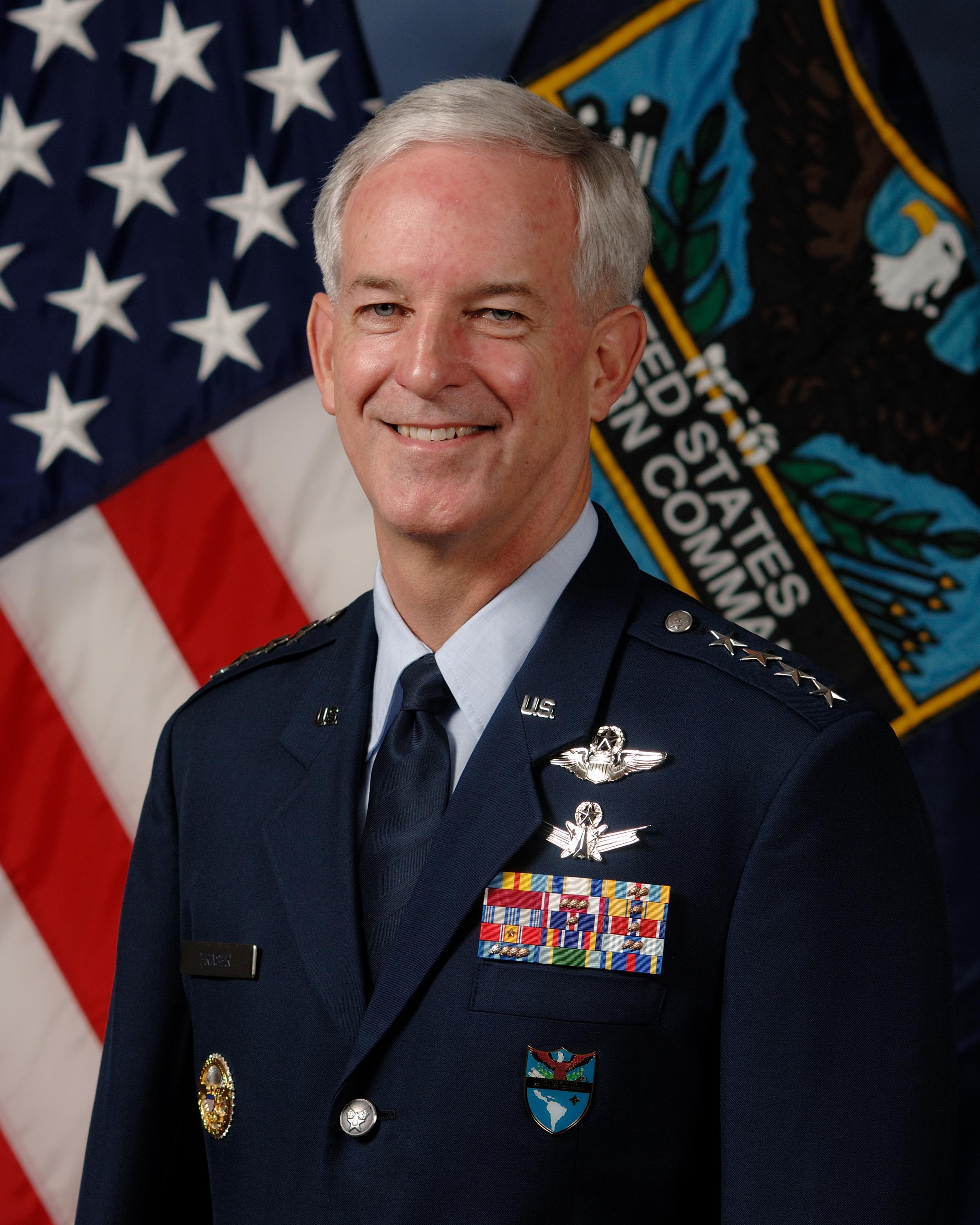
- Born: Douglas Malcolm Fraser; April 16, 1950 (age 76); Phoenix, Arizona, U.S.
- Military career
- Allegiance: United States
- Branch: United States Air Force
- Service years: 1972 – 2013
- Rank: General
- Nickname: Doug
- Commands: U.S. Southern Command; Alaskan Command
- Conflicts: Afghanistan, Yemen, Ukraine, Syria
- Awards: See below

Douglas Malcolm Fraser (born April 16, 1950) is a United States Air Force (USAF) general who served as the Commander, United States Southern Command (USSOUTHCOM). He was the first USAF officer to become USSOUTHCOM's combatant commander. He previously served as Deputy Commander, United States Pacific Command from April 2008 to June 24, 2009. He assumed his final assignment on June 25, 2012.

== Military career ==
General Fraser earned his commission upon graduation from the United States Air Force Academy in 1975. A qualified Command Pilot in fighter aircraft, his operational assignments include Europe, the Pacific, Air Combat Command and Air Force Space Command. He has previously served as Commander, Space Warfare Center, Schriever Air Force Base, Colorado; as well as Commander, Alaskan Command, United States Pacific Command; Commander, 11th Air Force, Pacific Air Forces; and Commander, Alaskan North American Defense Region, with headquarters at Elmendorf Air Force Base, Alaska.

== Education ==
Fraser earned a Bachelor of Science in political science from the United States Air Force Academy in Colorado Springs, Colorado, in 1975. He attended Squadron Officer School at Maxwell Air Force Base, Alabama, in 1979, and returned to Maxwell Air Force Base in 1987 for the Air Command and Staff College. That same year, he earned a Master of Science in political science from Auburn University. In 1992, he attended the National War College at Fort Lesley J. McNair, Washington, D.C. He completed the Senior Executives in National and International Security program at the Harvard Kennedy School in 2004, the Joint Flag Officer Warfighting Course at Maxwell Air Force Base in 2005, and Pinnacle in Norfolk, Virginia, in 2006.

== Assignments ==
1. August 1975 - July 1976, student, undergraduate pilot training, Vance Air Force Base, Oklahoma
2. September 1976 - March 1977, F-15 student, 405th Tactical Training Unit, Luke Air Force Base, Arizona
3. June 1977 - May 1980, F-15 pilot, 36th Tactical Fighter Wing, Bitburg Air Base, West Germany
4. June 1980 - June 1983, F-15 squadron weapons officer, 405th Tactical Training Wing, Luke Air Force Base, Arizona
5. July 1983 - June 1985, flight commander, 49th Tactical Fighter Wing, Holloman Air Force Base, New Mexico
6. July 1985 - July 1986, aide to the Commander, 12th Air Force, Bergstrom Air Force Base, Texas
7. August 1986 - June 1987, student, Air Command and Staff College, Maxwell Air Force Base, Alabama
8. July 1987 - July 1989, fighter programmer, Directorate of Programs and Resources, Headquarters United States Air Force, Washington, D.C.
9. July 1989 - May 1991, member, Chief of Staff of the Air Force Staff Group, Headquarters United States Air Force, Washington, D.C.
10. July 1991 - June 1992, Commander, Weapons and Tactics Flight, 18th Operations Support Squadron, Kadena Air Base, Japan
11. June 1992 - October 1992, Director of Operations, 44th Fighter Squadron, Kadena Air Base, Japan
12. October 1992 - July 1993, Commander, 12th Fighter Squadron, Kadena Air Base, Japan
13. August 1993 - June 1994, student, National War College, Fort Lesley J. McNair, Washington, D.C.
14. July 1994 - July 1996, analysis assistant, Office of Assistant Secretary of Defense for Strategy and Requirements, Washington, D.C.
15. July 1996 - June 1997, Director, Chief of Staff of the Air Force Operations Group, Headquarters U.S. Air Force, Washington, D.C.
16. July 1997 - January 1999, Commander, 366th Operations Group, Mountain Home Air Force Base, Idaho
17. February 1999 - January 2000, executive assistant to the Commander in Chief, United States Pacific Command, Camp H.M. Smith, Hawaii
18. January 2000 - April 2002, Commander, 3d Wing, Elmendorf Air Force Base, Alaska
19. April 2002 - June 2003, Commander, Space Warfare Center, Air Force Space Command, Schriever Air Force Base, Colorado
20. May 2003 - October 2005, Director of Air and Space Operations, Headquarters Air Force Space Command, Peterson Air Force Base, Colorado
21. October 2005 - April 2008, Commander, Alaskan Command, United States Pacific Command; Commander, 11th Air Force, Pacific Air Forces; and Commander, Alaskan North American Defense Region, Elmendorf Air Force Base, Alaska
22. April 2008 - June 2009, Deputy Commander, United States Pacific Command, Camp H.M. Smith, Hawaii
23. June 2009 - November 2012, Commander, United States Southern Command, Miami, Florida

== Flight information ==
- Rating: Command pilot
- Flight hours: More than 3,100
- Aircraft flown: F-15A/B/C/D, F-15E, F-16 and C-37

== Awards and decorations ==
Personal decorations
	Defense Distinguished Service Medal
	Air Force Distinguished Service Medal
	Defense Superior Service Medal with two bronze oak leaf clusters
Width-44 crimson ribbon with a pair of width-2 white stripes on the edges	Legion of Merit
	Meritorious Service Medal with three bronze oak leaf clusters
	Air Force Commendation Medal with bronze oak leaf cluster
	Air Force Achievement Medal
Unit awards
	Joint Meritorious Unit Award
	Outstanding Unit Award with bronze oak leaf cluster
	Organizational Excellence Award with bronze oak leaf cluster
Campaign and service medals
	National Defense Service Medal with bronze service star
	Global War on Terrorism Service Medal
Service, training, and marksmanship awards
	Air Force Overseas Long Tour Service Ribbon with two bronze oak leaf clusters
	Air Force Longevity Service Award with silver and three bronze oak leaf clusters
	Small Arms Expert Marksmanship Ribbon
	Air Force Training Ribbon
Foreign awards
	Order of the Sun of Peru, Grand Cross
	Order of Merit of Duarte, Sánchez and Mella, Grand Officer (Dominican Republic)
	Order of Military Merit Antonio Nariño (Colombia)
	Grand Cross of the Air Force Cross of Aeronautical Merit (Colombia)
	Military Medal "Faith on the Cause" (Colombian Air Force)
	Medal of the Ministry of Defence (Colombia)

Other accoutrements
U.S. Air Force Command Pilot Badge
Master Space Operations Badge
Office of the Secretary of Defense Identification Badge
United States Southern Command Identification Badge

=== Other foreign awards ===
- Chilean Joint Staff Badge

== Effective dates of promotion ==
Promotions
Insignia	Rank	Date
	General	June 25, 2009
	Lieutenant General	October 11, 2005
	Major General	August 1, 2004
	Brigadier General	July 1, 2001
	Colonel	February 1, 1995
	Lieutenant Colonel	April 1, 1990
	Major	October 1, 1986
	Captain	June 4, 1979
	First Lieutenant	June 4, 1977
	Second Lieutenant	June 4, 1975

== Succession ==
Military offices
Preceded by James G. Stavridis	United States Southern Command; July 1, 2009 – November 19, 2012	Succeeded by John F. Kelly
