= James Oliphant Fraser Jr. =

Newfoundland politician

James Oliphant Fraser Jr. (1858 – April 22, 1896) was a lawyer and politician in Newfoundland. He represented Fortune Bay in the Newfoundland House of Assembly as a Tory from 1893 to 1896.

The son of James Oliphant Fraser, who also represented Fortune Bay in the assembly, Fraser was born and educated in St. John's. He went on to study law, practised as a solicitor, and was called to the Newfoundland bar in 1888. Additionally, he served as an agent for the Scottish Provident Institution and the Dominion Safety Fund Life Association.

Fraser died in office in 1896.
