= Bill Fraser (Australian footballer) =

Australian rules footballer

Personal information
- Full name: William Fraser
- Born: 29 March 1867; Merton, Victoria
- Died: 21 February 1938 (aged 70); Mansfield, Victoria
- Original team: Port Melbourne (VFA)
- Position: Utility

Playing career^{1}
Years	Club	Games (Goals)
1889–1893	Port Melbourne	98 (137)
1895–1896	South Melbourne (VFA)	35 (30)
1897–1904	South Melbourne	88 (18)
Total		221 (185)
- ^{1} Playing statistics correct to the end of 1904.

William 'Buns' Fraser (29 March 1867 – 21 February 1938) was an Australian rules footballer who played for South Melbourne in the Victorian Football League (VFL), and for both South Melbourne and Port Melbourne in the Victorian Football Association.

Fraser joined Port Melbourne in 1889, and established himself as a forward. He was Port Melbourne's leading goalkicker each year from 1890 to 1893, including kicking 40 goals in the 1892 season. Highly sought after, he joined the neighbouring South Melbourne Football Club – at that time a bitter rival of Port Melbourne – in 1894; but Port Melbourne refused to transfer him, and he ultimately stood out of football for the whole of the 1894 season.

Prior to 1895, he was finally cleared to South Melbourne, where he played in both the VFA and VFL until 1904. Fraser captained South Melbourne in its first two VFL seasons. He could play a variety of positions and was used as a winger, forward and centreman during his career. Fraser was a forward pocket in the 1899 VFL Grand Final loss to Fitzroy.
