= Billy Fraser (footballer, born 1868) =

Scottish footballer

Personal information
- Full name: William Fraser
- Date of birth: 1868
- Place of birth: Glasgow, Scotland
- Position: Right half

Senior career*
Years	Team	Apps	(Gls)
1890	Renton		
1891–1892	Stoke	3	(0)
1892	Renton		
- * Club domestic league appearances and goals

William Fraser (1868 – unknown) was a Scottish footballer who played in the Football League for Stoke.

== Career ==
Fraser was born in Glasgow and played for Renton before joining English side Stoke in 1891. He played three matches for Stoke during the 1891–92 season before returning to Renton.

== Career statistics ==
Club	Season	League			FA Cup		Total	
Club	Season	Division	Apps	Goals	Apps	Goals	Apps	Goals
Stoke	1891–92	The Football League	3	0	0	0	3	0
Career Total			3	0	0	0	3	0
