= Frank Frazier =

American football player (1960–2000)

No. 61, 57, 76
- Position: Guard

Personal information
- Born: June 15, 1960; Tampa, Florida, U.S.
- Died: November 3, 2000 (aged 40); Miami, Florida, U.S.
- Listed height: 6 ft 5 in (1.96 m)
- Listed weight: 290 lb (132 kg)

Career information
- High school: Tampa Bay Tech
- College: Miami
- NFL draft: 1982: undrafted

Career history
- San Francisco 49ers (1982)*; Oakland Invaders (1983); Oklahoma Outlaws (1984); Washington Redskins (1987)
- * Offseason or practice squad member only

Career NFL statistics
- Games played: 3
- Stats at Pro Football Reference

Frank Lee Frazier (June 15, 1960 – November 3, 2000) was an American professional football guard in the National Football League (NFL) for the Washington Redskins in 1987. He played college football at the University of Miami.
