= Will Frazer =

American educator

William Frazer
- Born: November 28, 1958 (age 67); Gainesville, Florida
- Education: BS in Accounting from University of Florida
- Occupations: Math educator, Former bond trader
- Years active: 1997–present
- Spouse: Jennifer Frazer
- Parents: William Frazer II (father); Mary Ann (mother)

William "Will" Frazer III (born 1958) is an American educator.

Frazer worked as a bond trader on Wall Street before becoming a teacher at Buchholz High School in Gainesville, Florida, where he created and coached the nationally recognized math team, leading them to 16 of 17 consecutive Mu Alpha Theta national math championships.

In 2024, Frazer opened The Frazer School, an independent K-12 school in Gainesville that focuses on competitive academics.

== Early life and education ==
Frazer was born and raised in Gainesville, Florida. His father, William Frazer II, was an economics professor at the University of Florida's Warrington College of Business. His mother, Mary Ann, was the city clerk of Gainesville and worked as a realtor.

Frazer attended Buchholz High School, where he was the first golfer to qualify for the state championship. He graduated in 1976, then earned a bachelor's degree in accounting from the University of Florida's Fisher School of Accounting in 1980.

== Finance career ==
In the early 1980s, Frazer worked at Lazard Frères as a bond trader. Years later, he said he hated the finance-industry culture, in which he "just didn't feel healthy".

He retired from the industry at age 27, bought two Ferraris, and moved to Black Diamond Ranch, a luxurious golf club in Lecanto, Citrus County. He moved back to Gainesville a few years later, began coaching golf at P.K. Yonge High School and Buchholz High School, and served on the City of Gainesville's pension board.

== Teaching career ==
Frazer started teaching mathematics at Buchholz High School in spring 1997. He initially inquired about teaching a finance course at Buchholz's finance academy, but there were none available, so Buchholz offered Frazer a math course instead. He founded the Buchholz math team in 1998, and under his leadership, the math team achieved success in state and national competitions. From 2007 to 2016, the team won ten consecutive Mu Alpha Theta national championships, then six of the next seven.

In 2022, this success drew national media coverage. The Wall Street Journal described the team as "America's greatest math team" and a “dynasty built by one teacher.” Frazer appeared on Fox & Friends to discuss the team's achievements. The Florida Department of Education recognized the Buchholz math program as a model for other schools. Several Florida senators met with Frazer to discuss how the state could reproduce his success.

The following year, Frazer said he would leave Buchholz to open an independent academic institution in Gainesville that would focus on competitive academics. The Frazer School opened in August 2024. It won the 2025 PhysicsBowl World Championship and won the 2025 Mu Alpha Theta national championship. They won the Mu Alpha Theta national championship again in 2026.
