= Kappa Mu Epsilon =

American mathematics honor society

- ΚΜΕ
- Founded: April 18, 1931; 94 years ago Northeastern State University
- Type: Honor
- Affiliation: ACHS
- Status: Active
- Emphasis: Mathematics
- Scope: National
- Motto: "Develop an appreciation for the beauty in mathematics"
- Colors: Pink and Silver
- Symbol: Five-pointed star and the pentagon
- Flower: Pink wild rose
- Publication: The Pentagon
- Chapters: 150
- Members: 88,000+ lifetime
- Headquarters: c/o Prof. Steven Shattuck; School of Computer Science and Mathematics; University of Central Missouri; P.O. Box 800; Warrensburg, Missouri 64093; United States
- Website: kappamuepsilon.org

Kappa Mu Epsilon (ΚΜΕ) is an American mathematics honor society. It was founded by Emily Kathryn Wyant in 1931 at Northeastern Oklahoma State Teachers College to focus on the needs of undergraduate mathematics students. There are now over 80,000 members in about 150 chapters. It is a member of the Association of College Honor Societies.

== History ==
In 1931, Emily Kathryn Wyant founded Kappa Mu Epsilon at Northeastern Oklahoma State Teachers College in Tahlequah, Oklahoma. Wyatt was professor of mathematics and worked to turn the campus math club that was established in 1927 into a national honor society that would focus on the needs of undergraduate mathematics students. She was assisted by L. P. Woods, head of the Department of Mathematics and Dean of Men. Woods created the initiation rituals for members and officers.

The founding members included Wyant and Woods, along with 22 other faculty and students. Wyant served as its first president.

The five goals of Kappa Mu Epsilon are to further interest in mathematics, emphasize the role of mathematics in the development of civilization, develop an appreciation of the power and the beauty of mathematics, recognize the outstanding mathematical achievement of its members, and familiarize members with the advancements being made in mathematics.

A second chapter, Iowa Alpha, was chartered at Iowa State Teachers College on May 27, 1931. This was followed by Kansas Alpha, at Kansas State Teachers College on January 30, 1932. Missouri Alpha was established at Southwest Missouri State College on May 20, 1932. On May 30, 1932, Kappa Mu Epsilon merged with a math society at Mississippi State College, forming Mississippi Alpha.

Kappa Mu Epsilon became publishing its journal, The Pentagon, in the fall of 1941. The organization became an official member of the Association of College Honor Societies in 1968. It has chartered 205 chapters with more than 88,000 members as of 2018.

== Symbols ==
The Kappa Mu Epsilon motto is A-na-ptus-se-te tan ek-te-ma-sin too kal-loos ton matha-ma-ti-kon or "Develop an appreciation for the beauty of mathematics." Its symbols are the five-pointed star and the pentagon, chosen to mimic those of the Pythagoreans.

Taking from the equation ρ=asin(5θ), its flower is the pink wild rose because its five petals fit into a pentagon. The society's colors are pink and silver, with pink coming from the wild rose and silver from the star.

The society's badge is a pentagon with slightly concave sides. Its upper half has a five-leaf rose and the lower half has the Greek letters ΚΜΕ. The Kappa Mu Epsilon seal is a circle with a five-pointed star that encloses a five-leaf rose and is encircled by the legend "Kappa Mu Epsilon, Founded 1931."

Its crest is a shield with a five-pointed star, with a graph of the rose ρ = a sin (5 θ) in its center. The star is surrounded by a conventionalized butterfly that represents the biological sciences; a moon and three stars representing the physical sciences; the symbol S angle n represents the business world; a shamrock and a slide rule for the engineering; and a book of knowledge symbolizing the students and teachers. The badge of the society is above the shield. Below the shield is a streamer with the Greek motto.

== Membership ==
Membership is open to students and faculty. Students must be in the top 35 percent of the class with at least three completed semesters. In addition, the student must have completed three college mathematics courses, including calculus, with a B or better average.

== Activities ==
The society sponsors a biennial national conference as well as regional conventions on alternate years which allow both for the sharing of ideas and the opportunity for students to present papers, preparing them for the graduate research experience.

KME produces a yearly journal called The Pentagon with student articles on mathematical topics. The society presents the George Mach Service Award for major contributions to the society.George Mach Service Award.

== See also ==
- Mu Alpha Theta, ΜΑΘ (mathematics, high school)
- Mu Sigma Rho, ΜΣΡ (statistics)
- Pi Mu Epsilon, ΠΜΕ (mathematics)
- Association of College Honor Societies
