= Emily Kathryn Wyant =

American mathematician

- Born: January 16, 1897; Ipava, Illinois, US
- Died: July 16, 1942 (aged 45)
- Known for: founder of Kappa Mu Epsilon

Academic background
- Education: University of Missouri, BA 1921, MA 1922, PhD 1929
- Thesis: The Ideals in the Algebra of Generalized Quaternions over the Field of Rational Numbers (1929)
- Doctoral advisor: George E. Wahlin

Academic work
- Discipline: Mathematics
- Institutions: Northeastern State Teachers College; Athens College

Emily Kathryn Wyant (January 16, 1897 – July 16, 1942) was an American mathematician known as the founder of Kappa Mu Epsilon, a mathematical honor society focusing on undergraduate education.

== Early life ==
Wyant was born on January 16, 1897, in Ipava, Illinois. Her father was a student in Illinois and later a shopkeeper in Bolivar, Missouri, where she graduated from high school in 1914. She attended the University of Missouri on a part-time and summer basis while supporting herself as a school teacher, finally completing a bachelor's degree in education in 1921.

She became a mathematics instructor at Missouri while continuing her education there. She earned a master's degree in physics in 1922, with a minor in mathematics, and completed her Ph.D. in 1929. Her dissertation, The Ideals in the Algebra of Generalized Quaternions over the Field of Rational Numbers, concerned algebraic number theory and was supervised by George E. Wahlin. As part of her doctoral studies, she also minored in astronomy.

== Career ==
In 1930, Wyant took a position at the Northeastern State Teachers College in Tahlequah, Oklahoma, as a professor of mathematics. In 1933, she left Northeastern State to become a postdoctoral researcher at the University of Chicago. In 1934, she took another faculty position, as head of the mathematics department at Athens College in Athens, Alabama. She became head of the mathematics department there but took an early retirement in 1940 due to poor health.

Wyant was active in the mathematical honor society Pi Mu Epsilon, in the mathematical graduate student sorority Sigma Delta Epsilon, and in the Mathematical Association of America. She became the national president of Sigma Delta Epsilon in 1926 and chaired the Missouri section of the Mathematical Association of America in 1927, as its first female officer.

During Wyant's time at Northeastern, she worked to transform the local mathematics club, founded three years before her arrival, into another national honor society, Kappa Mu Epsilon. The society itself was officially founded in April 1931, and Wyant was elected as its first leader, under the title "President Pythagoras". Through Wyant's efforts in making connections with faculty at other colleges and universities, the group quickly spread. She was succeeded in 1935 by the group's second president, J. A. G. Shirk of Pittsburg State University. Later, she became the society historian, and despite her failing health, she traveled with a nurse to the group's national convention in Missouri in 1941.

== Personal life ==
She died on July 16, 1942.
