= List of killings by law enforcement officers in the United States, July 2025 =

This is a list of people reported killed by non-military law enforcement officers in the United States in July 2025, whether in the line of duty or not, and regardless of reason or method. The listing documents the occurrence of a death, making no implications regarding wrongdoing or justification on the part of the person killed or officer involved. Killings are arranged by date of the incident that caused death. Different death dates, if known, are noted in the description. The table below lists 135 people.

== July 2025 ==
Date	Name (age) of deceased	Race	Location	Description
2025-07-31	John Horton (82)	White	Athens, Ohio	During a pursuit, a police vehicle driven by a state trooper struck an unrelated vehicle which was attempting to make a left turn, killing the couple and their dogs.
2025-07-31	LeAnn Horton (82)	White	Athens, Ohio	During a pursuit, a police vehicle driven by a state trooper struck an unrelated vehicle which was attempting to make a left turn, killing the couple and their dogs.
2025-07-31	Ramon Flores Jr. (57)	Hispanic	Hacienda Heights, California	Los Angeles deputies responded to reports of a man assaulting a woman with a knife. When they entered, they heard a woman screaming before a deputy shot Flores, who charged at them while he was armed with two knives. The footage was released.
2025-07-31	James Andrew Jennings (54)	White	Otisville, Michigan	A domestic violence suspect who barricaded himself at a home stated that he had not intentions of going to jail and fired at police. State troopers returned fire, killing him.No body camera footage of the incident has been shared with the public as of January, 2026.
2025-07-31	John Edgar Beck (83)	White	Summit, Utah	A deputy performed a PIT maneuver on a vehicle that had fled a traffic stop. The driver died of the injuries resulted from the crash.No body camera footage of the incident has been shared with the public as of January, 2026.
2025-07-31	unidentified	Unknown	Granbury, Texas	While Hood County deputies were serving a warrant in Indian Harbor subdivision, the suspect reportedly presented a gun toward them. They fatally shot the suspect.No body camera footage of the incident has been shared with the public as of January, 2026.
2025-07-31	Akintunde Campbell (38)	Black	Rochester, New York	Police responded to reports of a suspicious male. When officers found the man, there was an altercation, and police fatally shot the man when he pulled out a handgun and refused to drop it. The footage was released by police.
2025-07-31	Carlos Jackson (18)	Black	St. Louis, Missouri	Police were investigating a carjacking when a group of people arrived. When officers approached, Jackson ran, and officers chased him. Police shot Jackson, who they said was armed with a handgun.No body camera footage of the incident has been shared with the public as of January, 2026.
2025-07-31	Clayton Bailey (34)	White	Muskogee, Oklahoma	Police were called after a man reportedly pointed a rifle at a code enforcement officer. When officers arrived, the man shot at them, striking a Lenco BearCat, and police shot and killed the suspect. The footage was released during the news conference.
2025-07-31	unidentified male (28)	Unknown	South Fulton, Georgia	Fairburn Police were chasing a kidnapping suspect who was fleeing in a car. During the chase, officers performed a PIT maneuver on the suspect's vehicle, causing it to flip and crash, striking a wall. The suspect was ejected and died from the impact.No body camera or dashcam footage of the incident has been shared with the public as of January, 2026.
2025-07-30	Cody Haffner (33)	White	Lathrop, California	CHP troopers responded to a crash on the freeway. When they are on scene, they exchanged fire with the suspect. The suspect was pronounced deceased in the hospital.No body camera or dashcam footage of the incident has been shared with the public as of January, 2026.
2025-07-30	Brandon Whitcomb (36)	White	Vancouver, Washington	A Clark County deputy spotted a man who had been called for breaking in his parents house and threatened to kill them. The deputy shot and killed him. He was armed. The sheriff's office released the bodycam footage on Youtube.
2025-07-30	Daniel Aron Kahn (38)	White	Springfield, Oregon	Officers responded for a person acting disorderly inside a business. Upon arrival, both Springfield officers were stabbed by the suspect. Responding Oregon State Police fatally shot the suspect.No body camera or dashcam footage of the incident has been shared with the public as of January, 2026, though it was mentioned in the investigation.
2025-07-29	Tyson Reach (19)	Black	Indianapolis, Indiana	IMPD responded to a stolen car report before an officer was shot and injured by one of the suspects while they were apprehending them. The officer returned fire. Reach was shot and died on August 22nd. Three other suspects were in custody and charged.The footage was released.
2025-07-29	Morton Clauschee Clark (48)	Native American	Chinle, Arizona	Clark barricaded himself with an axe while US Marshals and Navajo PD attempted to serve a federal arrest warrant. He reportedly approached SWAT members with the axe before being fatally shot.No body camera or dashcam footage of the incident has been shared with the public as of January, 2026.
2025-07-29	Samuel Edgardo Rivera (44)	Hispanic	Gainesville, Florida	SWAT team members were serving a narcotics warrant on the suspect. The suspect barricaded himself and fired at them. At some point, a deputy shot and killed him. The footage was released.
2025-07-29	David Martin (46)	Black	Gary, Indiana	A SWAT team went to a home to serve a narcotics warrant. During the encounter, a man ran out of the house and engaged officers with a gun. They fatally shot him.No body camera or dashcam footage of the incident has been shared with the public as of January, 2026.
2025-07-29	Shawn R. Phillips (38)	White	Berlin Township, New Jersey	Two state troopers assigned to a U.S. Marshals task force shot and killed a man involved in an investigation. Few details were released. Police said the man had a revolver.The footage was released in April 2026.
2025-07-28	Briana Leigh Cisick (33)	White	Apache Junction, Arizona	A woman reportedly ran onto the roadway before being struck and killed by a patrol SUV.No body camera or dashcam footage of the incident has been shared with the public as of January, 2026.
2025-07-28	Dakota Hawver (26)	White	Reno, Nevada	Grand Sierra Resort shooting: A gunman opened fire into a crowd of people at the valet area of the Grand Sierra Resort, killing two and critically injured three others. He then fled through the parking lot, exchanged fire with a security guard, and killed another man who was driving by. Police shot and wounded him during the encounter. He died on July 31st. Reno Police released the footage of the fatal shootout.
2025-07-28	Bernardo Pedraza (35)	Hispanic	Brownsville, Texas	Brownsville Police officers followed a woman into her residence after she had an altercation with the suspect, Pedraza. Pedraza was waiting there and killed the woman when they encountered him. Officers returned fire, killing Pedraza.No body camera or dashcam footage of the incident has been shared with the public as of January, 2026.
2025-07-28	Lucas James-Erick Alvesteffer (22)	Native American	Cody, Wyoming	An officer attempted to pull Alvesteffer over for not having a license plate. After the truck suffered a mechanic failure and stopped, police fatally shot Alvesteffer in a confrontation.No body camera or dashcam footage of the incident has been shared with the public as of January, 2026.
2025-07-27	Michael Redding (55)	White	Santee, California	San Diego deputies responded to a call about an assault with a firearm and criminal threats. Later they learned that the suspect had barricaded himself, was armed, and had felony warrants. During the standoff, deputies deployed chemical agent into the resident, forcing the man the came out. The man then fired shots at them before being fatally shot.The footage was released.
2025-07-27	Paul Scott Wier (51)	White	Okeechobee, Florida	A homicide suspect was killed in a shootout with deputies after killing two neighbors.No body camera or dashcam footage of the incident has been shared with the public as of January, 2026.
2025-07-26	John Mullins (79)	Unknown	Jensen Beach, Florida	A deputy fatally struck a bicyclist with his vehicle while responding to a separate crash.
2025-07-26	Jared Randell Nelson (35)	White	Blue Lake, California	Humboldt County Deputies attempted to arrest a man for brandishing a firearm. Deputies chased the man into the woods and shot him after Nelson fired a pistol at them. Only one of the four deputies’ body cameras was activated during the shooting. The footage was released by the sheriff's office.
2025-07-26	Ryan Kade Delahunt (33)	White	New Braunfels, Texas	New Braunfels Officers responded to a residence for a disturbance. The male subject reportedly lunged toward them with a knife before they shot and killed him.No body camera or dashcam footage of the incident has been shared with the public as of January, 2026.
2025-07-26	Scott H. McDonald (44)	White	De Pere, Wisconsin	Officers fatally shot a man who produced a rifle after negotiation efforts failed at a boat launch.No body camera or dashcam footage of the incident has been shared with the public as of January, 2026.
2025-07-25	Weston R. Stewart (38)	White	Needles, California	An off-duty San Bernardino sergeant was involved in a fatal boat collision on the Colorado River. He was charged with negligent use of watercraft under the influence (BUI).
2025-07-24	Mauricio Quas (33)	Hispanic	Thousand Oaks, California	Hospital staff called for help after Quas, a felon, broke free from soft medical restraints, removed his IV lines, resisted treatment, and armed himself with scissors and a syringe filled with medication and threatened to stab himself or others. A Ventura County Sheriff's Office deputy responded and stunned him with a taser before handcuffing him. About 20 minutes after the taser use, he suffered a medical emergency while receiving care and died 15 days later. The Ventura County Medical Examiner's autopsy (completed December 10, 2025) classified the manner of death as homicide. The footage was released.
2025-07-24	Benjamin Alstoft (40)	White	Cartersville, Georgia	During a high speed pursuit, Cobb County deputies performed a PIT maneuver on the suspect's car, causing it to crash. The man, Alstoft, was ejected from the car and died from the injuries.No body camera or dashcam footage of the incident has been shared with the public as of January, 2026.
2025-07-24	Todd St. John (21)	White	Corbin, Kentucky	A Knox County deputy cruiser collided with a vehicle during a traffic stop. The driver died from his injuries.
2025-07-24	Rodney Aubrey (64)	White	Kansas City, Missouri	Police shot and killed a man while trying to take him into custody. Police said the man had pointed a gun at an ambulance.No body camera or dashcam footage of the incident has been shared with the public as of January, 2026.
2025-07-24	Joanna Rebecca Rogers (43)	Black	Lewisville, Texas	Police pursued a woman who fled a traffic stop. The chase ended in a shopping center parking lot, where police shot and killed the woman after she allegedly pulled out a gun and refused to drop it.No body camera or dashcam footage of the incident has been shared with the public as of January, 2026.
2025-07-24	Walter McNary (76)	Black	Indianapolis, Indiana	Police pursued a man believed to have killed his wife at their home. The man shot at police several times during the chase, which ended on a dead-end road. Police shot and killed the man when he pointed a rifle at them. The footage was released.
2025-07-24	Nehemiah Flemming (19)	Black	Wichita, Kansas	Police said an officer was unloading equipment in a police station parking lot when Flemming and another male approached him. Police said Flemming asked the officer about Wichita Police's policy about shooting people armed with guns before producing a handgun. Two other officers noticed Flemming and the first officer struggling and shot him. A few still images regarding the incident were released in a press conference.
2025-07-23	unidentified juvenile	Unknown	Austin, Texas	A Travis County corrections officer and a teenage girl were found fatally shot. Officials believe the corrections officer shot the teenager before turning the gun on himself.
2025-07-23	Quaincy Tyron Page (31)	Black	Haltom City, Texas	Police responded to a 911 hang-up call at an apartment complex and shot Page after a confrontation. Few details were initially released. Page produced a large knife and attempted to attack the officers. Perceiving an imminent threat of serious bodily injury or death, the officers drew their duty weapons and discharged them, striking the suspect.
2025-07-23	Michael Parker (28)	White	Lorain, Ohio	While Lorain officers were having lunch in their patrol vehicles, Parker ambushed them with a rifle. Other responding officers killed Parker in a shootout. Three officers were shot, one of whom died of his injuries. The fallen officer, Phillip Wagner, had previously issued Parker a citation for negligently operating a vehicle.Elyria Police released the footage.
2025-07-22	Michael Crawford (39)	White	Starke, Florida	Deputies were attempting to contact a man who made verbal threats toward a Florida Credit Union employee earlier that day. He exited his residence with two firearms before being shot dead.
2025-07-21	Erick Charles Roberson (38)	White	Chattanooga, Tennessee	Officers along with Hamilton County deputies surrounded Roberson's vehicle in a parking lot after he evaded the police and had multiple warrants for his arrest. He reportedly rammed into officers and patrol vehicles before being fatally shot.
2025-07-21	Christopher James Stutler (51)	White	Fort Wayne, Indiana	Fort Wayne officers responded to reports of a man making concerning statements. Officers shot and killed him after he reportedly brandished a gun at them.
2025-07-20	Daniel L. Westrich (27)	White	Seville, Ohio	Ohio State troopers responded to a call for a man walking on the highway. A cruiser struck and killed him.
2025-07-20	Kyle Davis Graham (47)	White	Deer Island, Oregon	Sheriff's deputies pursued Graham, who had evaded police in Washington the previous day. After crashing near a creek, Graham was shot by a deputy. Police said Graham was armed.
2025-07-20	Craig Patrick Handzel (52)	White	Fayetteville, North Carolina	The Pearce's Mill Fire Department called for assistance due to a man with a firearm at the scene of a brush fire. Responding deputies located the man and shot him when he allegedly pointed the gun at them.
2025-07-20	Nathan Burney (72)	Black	Kinston, North Carolina	Police responded to a report of a man threatening a woman at a home. When police arrived, the man allegedly produced a firearm at the door, leading police to shoot.
2025-07-19	Samuel Hayes Jr. (31)	Black	St. Louis, Missouri	Hayes Jr. was taken and be placed onto a restraint chair after an altercation with his cellmate. He died two hours later. Hayes was imprisoned for felony counts of first-degree murder back in April, 2024.
2025-07-19	Darrin Laudermilk (65)	White	Wickes, Arkansas	A Grannis Police officer was responding to a call at a residence when Laudermilk allegedly walked onto his driveway and fired at police. The officer fired back, killing Laudermilk.
2025-07-19	Likune Sisay (46)	Black	Claremont, California	LA deputies responded to a report about a man threatening suicide. Upon arrival, the man, Sisay, reportedly charged at them with a knife as they attempted to detain him, forcing deputies to fatally shoot him.
2025-07-19	Juwan Harris (31)	Black	Tupelo, Mississippi	Officers and state troopers were pursuing a vehicle which reportedly contained a hostage. The vehicle later crashed along the highway before the driver, Harris, pointed a weapon at them. They fatally shot him.
2025-07-19	Lawrence W. Sullivan (71)	White	Jacksonville, Florida	JSO officers responded to a crash. According to the report, the male driver, who was armed with a gun, began wandering around and making suicidal statements. Officers negotiated with the man for 20 minutes before he turned toward a bicyclist, while armed. Officers then fatally shot him. The footage was released.
2025-07-18	Christopher J. Martin-Holmes (26)	Black	Macon, Georgia	A driver fled a traffic stop during the encounter with police. He later crashed the vehicle. When deputies approached it, the driver and the passenger inside opened fire. The deputy returned fire, killing one. The other suspect was arrested.
2025-07-18	Brian Prine (59)	White	Security-Widefield, Colorado	Deputies responded to a fight which possibly involving a gun. When police contacted a man and woman inside a house, the man reportedly became aggressive. A fight then ensued when deputies attempted to detain him, during which, he grabbed a deputy's taser and fired at them. They fired back. A gun was found in the driveway.
2025-07-18	Mark McMillin (60)	White	Winkelman, Arizona	Deputies were searching for a suspect who was wanted in connection with sex crimes against children. They shot and killed him at a house after he reportedly pulled out a gun.
2025-07-17	Rigoberto Lopez (32)	Hispanic	Ivanhoe, California	Detectives were called for a man wanted in connection of a shooting back on July 7th. When they were searching the apartments for Lopez, he reportedly fired at them. They retreated and returned fire, killing him.
2025-07-17	Harrison Charles Deppe (52)	White	Woodbridge, Virginia	Officers responded to a report about a man displaying a gun. They surrounded the suspect's car and tried to negotiate with him when they arrived. Hours later, the suspect exited the car and reportedly ran toward a mall with a crossbow. At which point, officers shot and killed him.
2025-07-17	Melissa Mills (46)	White	San Tan Valley, Arizona	Police pursued a woman who failed to stop for a traffic stop for five to ten minutes. Police shot and killed the woman, who allegedly fired at police.
2025-07-17	Christopher Pierce (52)	White	Jackson, Tennessee	Police responded to a road rage call in a parking lot. Pierce allegedly fired a shot as officers approached his vehicle, and police shot him.
2025-07-17	Jeremy Jackson Bonham (39)	White	Gastonia, North Carolina	A stand-off occurred after police responded to an assault report at a home. After two hours, Bonham allegedly fired at police with a rifle, and officers shot him.
2025-07-17	Alejandro Torres III (48)	Hispanic	St. Croix, United States Virgin Islands	A mother called Virgin Islands Police for her son's behavior. When officers encountered the suspect, a fight broke out between him and the two officers. One of the officers fired a shot during the struggle, killing him.
2025-07-16	Bryan Daniel Hall (32)	White	Opelika, Alabama	Police responded to a domestic violence call in which a man barricaded himself in his home with a woman and 2-year-old. The woman was able to leave the home without injury. Police later shot the man.
2025-07-16	Amir Bradshear (26)	Black	Jacksonville, Florida	JSO officers responded to a home for domestic dispute. Upon arrival, they encountered a man pulling a pregnant woman's her, screaming, while the woman was holding another child. Tasers were ineffective. Police talked to the man for half an hour but he did not comply and kept chewing the woman's ripped off hair. A violent fight later ensued between the man and officers, forcing three of them to shoot the man.Police released the report and footage "outside the residence". Footage recorded inside the private residence is not included in the public release. Under Florida Statute 119, such recordings are confidential due to the resident's reasonable expectation of privacy. JSO stated they would pursue legal action to release it.
2025-07-16	Orlando Silva-Lemus (25)	Hispanic	Galveston, Texas	A Harris County deputy spotted a stolen truck near William P. Hobby Airport. The driver sped off. The man later sped down the freeway, toward additional responding officers, during which, the first shootout ensued. After the first shootout, the chase continued for more than 30 minutes, ending on Galveston Island, where the armed man exited the truck before being shot dead by police.
2025-07-15	Sammy Jenkins (69)	Unknown	Albuquerque, New Mexico	Police responded to a domestic incident and found a suicidal man barricaded himself inside. After an hour of negotiation, the man started firing from the second story of the residence, forcing four Albuquerque officers to return fire, killing him. The footage was released.
2025-07-15	Nadine Osuch (63)	White	Livingston County, New York	A woman was struck and killed by a vehicle driven by an off-duty State Park police officer.
2025-07-15	Adam Clinton Wolf (57)	White	Normanna Township, St. Louis County, Minnesota	St. Louis County deputies along with other emergency services responded to a reported arson. When officers and a volunteer firefighter arrived, the suspect shot at them with a rifle. Deputies later engaged the suspect near the area. The suspect fired at them. Five deputies returned fire and killed him. The footage was released.
2025-07-15	Domonick Knight (38)	Black	Fall River, Massachusetts	Family members called the police to report that Knight was armed and was expressing suicidal statements. After unsuccessful negotiation attempts, Fall River officers breached the door. Knight then fired at them, prompting a shootout. He was killed during the incident. The footage was released.
2025-07-14	unidentified male	Unknown	Beaumont, California	Task Force members and Beaumont Police attempted to serve a warrant on the suspect, during which, they encountered the suspect armed with a gun. Police fatally shot him.
2025-07-14	Derek Fyffe (37)	White	Worland, Wyoming	Police responded to reports of a man acting erratically under a bridge. An officer shot Fyffe after he pulled out a gun and shot at police. One officer was injured.No body camera footage of the incident has been shared with the public.
2025-07-14	Hector Rincon (47)	Hispanic	Corpus Christi, Texas	Corpus Christi Police responded to an assault with a weapon. When the officer arrived, he got into a struggle with the suspect. The suspect reportedly tried to run the officer over before he opened fire, killing the suspect.No body camera footage of the incident has been shared with the public.
2025-07-14	Jeremy Flores (26)	Hispanic	Los Angeles, California	A man who was armed with an airsoft rifle and barricaded himself inside a van was fatally shot by LAPD in Boyle Heights neighborhood. The footage was released by police.
2025-07-14	Terrell Carter Jr. (39)	Black	Toledo, Ohio	Toledo Police received a report of a man shooting another man. Upon arrival, Carter fled on foot, before pulling out a gun and firing at officers. They fired 73 rounds in total at him, killing him.The footage was released during a press conference.
2025-07-13	Gurpreet Singh (35)	Asian	Los Angeles, California	A man waving a machete in the middle of downtown near Crypto.com Arena was shot by LAPD after he crashed his car while waving the weapon, exited, and charged officers. He died on July 17th. Bodycam footage capturing the incident has since been released.
2025-07-13	Derik Bonet-Rodriguez (31)	Hispanic	Kissimmee, Florida	An Osceola County deputy tried to detain Bonet-Rodriguez after spotting him running in and out traffic, which led to a physical altercation. During which, a taser was deployed. Shortly after him being handcuffed, he was found unresponsive. He was pronounced deceased in a hospital.
2025-07-13	Anthony Mendenhall (41)	White	Fanning Springs, Florida	Mendenhall was lying in a dark parking lot. A deputy didn't see him and ran him over with his patrol car.
2025-07-13	unidentified male (40s)	Unknown	Guadalupe, Arizona	After being involved in a minor car accident, a man ran from the scene and ran to Guadalupe, where his family called to report he was making suicidal comments. Sheriff's deputies found him near town hall, where he allegedly made more suicidal comments and pulled out a bladed weapon. Two deputies shot and killed him.
2025-07-13	Mateusz Dzierbun (48)	White	San Jose, California	San Jose officers confronted Dzierbun for he reported someone fatally stabbed his 9-year-old son. During the encounter, he stood up and charged at them with a kitchen knife. At which point, two officers fatally shot him. Police believed Dzierbun murdered his son and committed suicide by cop after later investigation.Police released the footage.
2025-07-13	Xavier Guadalupe Hernandez (30)	Hispanic	El Paso, Texas	Officers responded to a traffic hazard caused by a pedestrian standing in the roadway. He ignored officers' commands, resisted, and was tased by an officer. A bystander and an officer later restrained the man. The man, Hernandez, died in the hospital.The footage was released by police.
2025-07-13	Emilson Yoan Ordonez-Vanegaz (29)	Black	Centereach, New York	Suffolk County Police responded to a report indicating that Ordonez-Vanegaz had stabbed a man in the neck. When they were providing aid to the wounded man, they confronted Ordonez-Vanegaz with a knife. An officer shot him dead as he approached the victim, attempting to stab him again. The footage was released.
2025-07-13	Ronald Hazen Kerr (60)	Unknown	Middletown, Ohio	Middletown Police responded to a residence after a man shot and killed his wife. When they arrived, the man barricaded himself inside the building and fired at them during the negotiation. Officers killed the man in the shootout.
2025-07-13	Guy House (47)	White	Lexington, Kentucky	House shot and wounded a state trooper during a traffic stop near the Blue Grass Airport. He then stole a vehicle and drove it to a church, where he shot four people, killing a woman and her mother. Three responding officers shot and killed House.
2025-07-13	Jacob B. Hutchinson (27)	White	Montgomery, Alabama	Police pursued motorcyclist Hutchinson from Prattville to Montgomery. Following the chase and a foot pursuit, state troopers shot Hutchinson when he allegedly pulled out a knife.
2025-07-12	Charles Craig (54)	White	Dubach, Louisiana	Lincoln Parish deputies attempted to stop an armed suspect in a vehicle, who fled, which led to a chase. After the chase, deputies ordered the suspect to drop the gun, who ignored and reportedly made movement perceived as a threat. Deputies then fatally shot him.
2025-07-11	Jeffrey Daniel Foreman (53)	Unknown	Anchorage, Alaska	An inmate died after officers used force to subdue him during a fight in Anchorage Correctional Complex.
2025-07-11	Francis Gigliotti (43)	White	Haverhill, Massachusetts	Police responded to a call about a man acting erratically and running into oncoming traffic. During the encounter, multiple officers attempting to restrain him by holding him face down on the ground. He became unresponsive and died.Essex County DA released 28 minutes of edited video including CCTV and bystander video in a news conference. The bodycam footage was not shown.
2025-07-11	Arval Gross (63)	White	Thomson, Georgia	Deputies shot and killed Gross after he reportedly raised a shotgun toward them following a domestic dispute call.
2025-07-10	James Tullous (63)	Black	Los Angeles, California	An LAPD officer shot and killed a man who was in a physical altercation with another person in the Hyde Park neighborhood when he fired a round at them. The footages were released.
2025-07-10	Ladavian Kaliq Pearson (26)	Unknown	Euless, Texas	Euless Police stopped a Plano murder suspect after spotting him on the road. He exited his vehicle and fired at officers. They fired back, killing him.
2025-07-10	Troy Cannata (36)	White	Aventura, Florida	Police shot and killed an armed man during a confrontation at a beauty salon after a reported knife threat.
2025-07-10	Dale White (65)	Unknown	Silver Lake, Indiana	County Sheriff's Offices and SWAT team attempted to serve warrants for White. White reportedly pointed a gun at them before an officer shot him.
2025-07-10	Duane Butts (46)	White	Wheat Ridge, Colorado	A Wheat Ridge officer shot a suspect with a felony warrant during a struggle between the two of them.
2025-07-09	Ryder Houser (15)	White	Cleveland, Mississippi	A collision involving a Bolivar County deputy killed two teenagers driving to summer football practice.
2025-07-09	Joshua Willoughby (16)	White	Cleveland, Mississippi	A collision involving a Bolivar County deputy killed two teenagers driving to summer football practice.
2025-07-09	unidentified female (39)	Unknown	Houston, Texas	Houston SWAT team responded to a home with hostages inside for a woman in mental episode on Tuesday evening. On Wednesday morning, the woman came outside with a bulletproof vest and a pointed a rifle SWAT team members, forcing a SWAT officer to shoot her. The footage was released by HPD
2025-07-09	Jamari Rashaud Akins (20)	Black	Jacksonville, Florida	A robbery suspect shot a Jacksonville officer during a foot chase. The officer returned fire and killed the suspect. The footage was released.
2025-07-09	Jake Miller (37)	White	Dallas, Texas	A man kicked other residences' doors and reportedly stabbed himself with a knife he was holding. When officers arrived, the man advanced toward them with the knife before an officer opened fire. The footage was released.
2025-07-08	Jesse Duane Soderstrom (45)	Unknown	Spencer, North Carolina	Spencer Police shot and killed Soderstrom after he brandished a hammer at police following a traffic accident.
2025-07-08	Dante Romearo Smith (28)	White	Barnesville, Georgia	DNR game wardens responded to a report indicating that Smith was trespassing on a person’s property. When game wardens located him, he reportedly lunged at one of them with a knife. In response, the game warden shot and killed him.
2025-07-08	John Michael Jesse (54)	Unknown	Pueblo, Colorado	Pueblo Officers responded to a domestic dispute. The suspect reportedly pointed a gun at them before an officer shot him dead.
2025-07-07	Carlton Herndon (56)	Black	Forestville, Maryland	Off-duty officer Anthony Coleman who was driving a Ford truck struck Herndon's vehicle, killing him. Police believe speed and alcohol were contributing factors. Herndon was also a former Washington D.C. detective.
2025-07-07	David Erwin Jordan (60)	Unknown	Sheridan, Oregon	A Yamhill County deputy shot and killed a suspect who stabbed two people when the man brandished a knife.
2025-07-07	Scott Garvey (55)	White	Putney, Vermont	A state trooper shot Garvey following a stand-off at an apartment building that stemmed from a mental health call. State Police said Garvey was holding an object the trooper believed was a gun, though it was not stated what Garvey was holding. No guns were found in the home.
2025-07-07	Ted Feasel (54)	White	Greenfield, Indiana	Police shot Feasel at his home during a domestic disturbance call. Feasel allegedly pointed a handgun at officers.
2025-07-07	Holly Edward Oliver (59)	White	Brownwood, Texas	A woman reported to Brownwood Police that her husband, Oliver, was shooting a gun in the yard out of control. Oliver later went to another address. When officers located him, he drove toward police cars and opened fire, striking an officer multiple times during the shootout. They returned fire and killed him.The footage and police report were released.
2025-07-07	Ryan Louis Mosqueda (27)	Hispanic	McAllen, Texas	Mosqueda shot at United States Border Patrol agents outside a facility, hitting one. Other agents returned fire and killed him.
2025-07-06	Jeremy Lawrence Stahl (41)	White	Roy, Washington	Stahl fled a traffic stop when officers attempted to pull him over for speeding. During the chase, he struck a bystander with his vehicle. His car spun and crashed into a police cruiser that was pursuing him. He was ejected from his car and died from the injuries.
2025-07-06	Brendan Devonne Brown (26)	Black	Houston, Texas	Houston Police learned that an armed man tried to forced entry into a woman's apartment and assaulted her. When patrol officers arrived, a foot pursuit ensued before the suspect ran toward a sergeant while he was armed with a handgun. The sergeant shot and killed the suspect in response. The footage was released by HPD.
2025-07-06	Miftau Oladipo (35)	Black	Stafford, Texas	Stafford Officers responded to a robbery where they pursued the suspect. An officer shot and killed him when he reportedly charged at them with a knife and a brick. Tasers were ineffective.
2025-07-06	Raul Alberto Rivera (30)	Hispanic	Pisgah, North Carolina	Deputies located a man in a Pizza Hut parking lot for a welfare check. The man opened fire on them before they returned fire.
2025-07-06	Karim Kahn (37)	Asian	San Jose, California	A San Jose officer shot and killed a man when they responded to a family disturbance call. Kahn, who was under mental health crisis, pointed a rifle and fired at them during the confrontation. He was shot dead in the shootout. The footage was released by police.
2025-07-05	Charles Adair (50)	Black	Kansas City, Kansas	Adair was arrested and jailed on failure to appear for traffic violations. As he was returning to his cell from the infirmary, he began yelling and resisting, so sheriff's deputies were called in to restrain him. Deputies restrained him in his cell; shortly after, medical staff found he was unconscious. Adair died, and his death was ruled a homicide due to mechanical asphyxia. Deputy Richard Fatherley has been charged with second-degree murder and an alternative count of involuntary manslaughter.
2025-07-05	Jackson Cunningham (20)	White	Perdido Key, Florida	Two pedestrians were fatally struck by an unmarked patrol car driven by an off-duty Escambia County Sheriff's deputy.
2025-07-05	Nicole Grace Moore (20)	White	Perdido Key, Florida	Two pedestrians were fatally struck by an unmarked patrol car driven by an off-duty Escambia County Sheriff's deputy.
2025-07-05	Landon Watson (18)	White	Daytona Beach, Florida	Volusia County deputies responded to a stabbing incident scene where they found two victims who sustained multiple stab wounds. When they were searching for other victims in a residence, the suspect charged at them with a knife before they shot him dead.
2025-07-05	Danielle Lee Fisher (49)	White	Tulsa, Oklahoma	Police responded to a domestic disturbance and found a naked woman holding a butcher knife. An officer shot and killed the woman.The partial footage edited by KJRH News was released.
2025-07-05	unidentified male	Unknown	Tama, Iowa	Police received two calls that a man with a gun was going to harm himself. An officer found the man and shot him.
2025-07-05	Terrence Hastings Jr. (17)	Black	Lubbock, Texas	Police responded to a fight and found Hastings pointing a gun at other people. An officer chased the suspect and shot him after he allegedly fired at the other people. Five other people were taken to the hospital for injuries.No body camera or dashcam footage of the incident has been shared with the public as of January, 2026, though it was mentioned and reviewed by investigators.
2025-07-05	Alex Martinez-Sarmiento (26)	Hispanic	Colorado Springs, Colorado	Police responded to reports that a man was displaying a gun near several nightclubs. When officers found the man, he ran and reached for his waistband, leading an officer to shoot him. A loaded Glock 17 with an illegal extended magazine was found at the scene. The bodycam and CCTV footage were released.
2025-07-05	Anthony Pursley (38)	Black	Baton Rouge, Louisiana	Baton Rouge Police responded to a call of a distressed individual. Police said the man had a sharp object, and officers shot him after a taser was ineffective. BRPD released the footage.
2025-07-04	William Fregoso (36)	Hispanic	East Los Angeles, California	In the City Terrace neighborhood, sheriff's deputies responded to a shots fired report. The suspect fired at deputies who returned fire and killed them.The footage was released by LASD.
2025-07-04	Ricardo Sosa (40)	Unknown	Philadelphia, Pennsylvania	Officers responded to a domestic incident involving an armed man in the Fairhill neighborhood. Upon arrival, the man reportedly fired at them. They retreated and returned fire.No body camera or dashcam footage of the incident has been shared with the public as of January, 2026, though the footage exists.
2025-07-03	Nathan Daniel Edwards (32)	White	Tom Bean, Texas	Initial reports indicate sheriff's deputies responded to a disturbance involving a man with a gun. After a confrontation where he held his wife hostage with a knife, deputies shot the man. No body camera or dashcam footage of the incident has been shared with the public as of January, 2026, though the footage exists, which was mentioned by the sheriff's office.
2025-07-03	Michael Griffin Jr. (34)	Black	Milwaukee, Wisconsin	In Shorewood, a man killed a woman in a domestic violence shooting and injured two others, including a Shorewood Police officer. Later that day the subject was located in the Halyard Park neighborhood of Milwaukee and a shoot-out occurred, during which police fatally shot the suspect. The shooting footage was released.
2025-07-03	unidentified male	White	Dallas, Texas	Cedar Hill Police pursued a suspected drunk driver into Dallas. After the vehicular pursuit ended, an officer shot the man as he fled into a wooded area on foot.No body camera or dashcam footage of the incident has been shared with the public as of January, 2026.
2025-07-03	unidentified male (16)	Unknown	Detroit, Michigan	Detroit Officers wanted to contact three individuals with masks on, standing next to a building. As they detained one of them, the two others ran off. One shot an officer in the hand before being shot dead during a struggle. Another is still on the run.No body camera or dashcam footage of the incident has been shared with the public as of January, 2026, though it was mentioned in the investigation.
2025-07-03	Diamonte Lafanette (23)	Black	Lake Charles, Louisiana	Lafanette opened fire on officers after brandishing a gun at passing motorists. A brief exchange followed, then Lafanette fled on foot, being surrounded, re-emerged, and again shot at officers whom returned fire and struck him.No body camera or dashcam footage of the incident has been shared with the public as of January, 2026.
2025-07-02	John Franklin Carter (50)	White	Lufkin, Texas	Angelina County deputies attempted to initiate a traffic stop to serve a felony warrant on Carter. During the stop, both the female driver and Carter exited the vehicle. Carter was reportedly holding a replica gun and refused to drop it before a deputy opened fire. Police described it as a "suicide by cop" incident.No body camera or dashcam footage of the incident has been shared with the public as of January, 2026.
2025-07-02	unidentified	Unknown	Anniston, Alabama	An Oxford officer struck and killed a pedestrian with a vehicle.
2025-07-02	Marchello Woodard (43)	Black	Erie, Pennsylvania	Parole agents were performing compliance checks when they noticed Woodard in a vehicle and approached him. Police said Woodard drove off after agents identified themselves and dragged one agent, who shot and killed Woodard. In December, the agent was charged with criminal homicide.The parole agents weren't equipped with bodycams at the time of the incident.
2025-07-01	Dominic Saad (23)	Middle Eastern	Thousand Oaks, California	Deputies along with city police officers responded to a report of an armed suspect experiencing a mental health issue. When the man came to the balcony and fired a shot from a shotgun, an officer shot back, killing him. The footage was released by police.
2025-07-01	Pedro Leal (67)	Hispanic	Zillah, Washington	Police were called for a man who was inside his neighbor’s home. Zillah and Granger officers responded to the scene, and Leal refused to leave the house as officers negotiated with him for more than an hour. A confrontation ensued after which Leal was forcibly taken into custody and later died. Leal’s cause of death is listed as a broken vertebrae in his neck with damage to the spinal cord, and blunt-force trauma to the neck. His death was ruled a homicide.No body camera or dashcam footage of the incident has been shared with the public as of January, 2026.
2025-07-01	Justin Lawrence Hunt (37)	White	Warsaw, Kentucky	Hunt fled from a traffic stop for speeding which led to a pursuit. Hunt later lost control of his motorcycle, resulting in him leaving the road and going into a grassy area and down a steep embankment. A deputy chasing him was unable to stop his cruiser and fatally struck Hunt. No body camera or dashcam footage of the incident has been shared with the public as of January, 2026.
2025-07-01	Andrew Biscay (40)	White	Los Osos, California	Sheriff's deputies responded to a call and found Biscay in a vehicle. He exited and pointed a pellet handgun at them, and deputies shot and killed him after he approached them still holding the gun.A still image from bodycam footage of Biscay pointing a pellet gun at deputies was shown in the report.
2025-07-01	James Sherrill (36)	Unknown	Cascade, Iowa	During a traffic stop, the subject of the stop pulled out a handgun and shot a sheriff's deputy, injuring him. Sheriff's deputies shot and killed the suspect. The footage was released and the shooting was justified by the Iowa Attorney General’s Office. The raw footage was not disclosed.
2025-07-01	Cameron Dennett (25)	White	Lamar, South Carolina	Darlington County Deputy Devin Mason and his partner responded to a home for a wanted person, later identified as Dennett. Dennett ambushed both of them, killing Mason and injuring his partner. Other responding officers shot and killed him. Another person at the scene was in custody for unrelated charges.No body camera or dashcam footage of the incident has been shared with the public as of January, 2026.

== See also ==
- Death in custody § United States
- Henry A. Wallace Police Crime Public Database
- List of cases of police brutality
- List of countries with annual rates and counts for killings by law enforcement officers
- List of law enforcement officers killed in the line of duty in the United States
- List of law enforcement officers convicted for an on-duty killing in the United States
- List of shootings by US immigration agents
- List of police reforms related to the George Floyd protests
- List of unarmed African Americans killed by law enforcement officers in the United States
- Lists of killings by law enforcement officers
- Police brutality in the United States
- Police misconduct § United States
- Police riot § United States
- Police use of deadly force in the United States
