= Marleigh Chandler Sheaff =

American physicist

Marleigh Chandler Sheaff (1935–2017) was an American physicist whose research involved the development of instrumentation for particle physics. She was also known for helping to build international collaborations in physics.

== Life and career ==
Sheaff was born on March 18, 1935, in Springfield, Massachusetts, and grew up as an only child in Freeport, New York, on Long Island. She became a student at Barnard College, but interrupted her studies to marry and raise two children with Edmund H. Sheaff, seven years her senior, who became a medical laboratory specialist for the United States Navy. They moved to Montana, where both continued their schooling; Sheaff received a bachelor's degree from Montana State University, and was initiated into the Pi Mu Epsilon mathematics honor society, in 1961.

They moved to Berkeley, California, where Sheaff worked on bubble chamber experiments at the Lawrence Radiation Laboratory. Then in 1965 Sheaff moved to Madison, Wisconsin, where she completed her Ph.D. at the University of Wisconsin in 1978. She remained at the University of Wisconsin as a research scientist, also associated with Fermilab, until retiring in 1996. For the next two years she held a visiting position at CINVESTAV in Mexico until issues with her husband's health brought her back to Wisconsin.

Sheaff's husband died in 2002. Sheaff partnered with Steve Bracker, another physics instrumentation expert, splitting their retirement life between Wisconsin, Florida, and British Columbia. She died of pancreatic cancer on June 23, 2017.

== Recognition ==
Sheaff was named as a Fellow of the American Physical Society (APS) in 1994, after a nomination from the APS Forum on International Physics, "for her efforts in continuing and strengthening physics relations between the United States and developing countries".
