= Jordan Ross (American football) =

American football player

No. 29 – LSU Tigers
- Position: Defensive end
- Class: Junior

Personal information
- Listed height: 6 ft 5 in (1.96 m)
- Listed weight: 246 lb (112 kg)

Career information
- High school: Vestavia Hills (Vestavia Hills, Alabama)
- College: Tennessee (2024–2025); LSU (2026–present)
- Stats at ESPN

Jordan Destin Ross is an American college football defensive end for the LSU Tigers. He previously played for the Tennessee Volunteers.

== Early life ==
Ross is from Vestavia Hills, Alabama. He attended Vestavia Hills High School where he played football as a defensive end. As a junior in 2022, he helped Vestavia Hills to the second round of the Class 7A playoffs while posting 49 tackles, 16 tackles-for-loss and 2.5 sacks, as well as scoring two defensive touchdowns. He then totaled 72 tackles, 23 tackles-for-loss and 12.5 sacks as a senior, earning selection to the Under Armour All-America Game. Ross was named the 7A Defensive Player of the Year by Around The State Sports and as the Defensive Player of the Year by the Over the Mountain Journal.

A five-star recruit, Ross was ranked a top-10 player nationally as well as the best edge rusher in the nation by 247Sports and On3.com. He committed to play college football for the Tennessee Volunteers. He was the highest-ranked member of Tennessee's 2024 recruiting class.

== College career ==
Ross entered his true freshman season in 2024 as a backup defensive end, behind James Pearce Jr., Joshua Josephs and Caleb Herring. He was used mainly on special teams and posted three tackles, 1.5 tackles-for-loss and blocked a punt which he returned for a touchdown, earning selection to the Southeastern Conference (SEC) All-Freshman team. After Pearce graduated, Ross began seeing more significant playing time as a sophomore in the 2025 season.
