= Vann Stuedeman =

US softball coach

Current position
- Title: Head coach
- Team: UTSA
- Conference: American Athletic Conference

Biographical details
- Born: September 11, 1972 (age 54); Birmingham, Alabama, U.S.

Playing career
- 1991–1994: Huntingdon

Coaching career (HC unless noted)
- 1995–1996: West Alabama (GA)
- 1997–1999: Alabama-Huntsville (asst.)
- 1999–2000: East Limestone County HS
- 2000–2011: Alabama (asst.)
- 2011–2019: Mississippi State
- 2023: Illinois (asst.)
- 2024–Present: UTSA

Head coaching record
- Overall: 275–188 (.594)
- Tournaments: NCAA: 7–14 (.333)

Vann Stuedeman (born September 11, 1972) is an American softball coach who is the current head coach at UTSA. She also the former head coach of the Mississippi State Lady Bulldogs softball team, which represents Mississippi State University in the Southeastern Conference. She has led the Lady Bulldogs to NCAA Tournament appearances in seven of her eight years as head coach.

Stuedeman was previously the pitching coach at Alabama, where she helped lead the Crimson Tide to six Women's College World Series appearances and an NCAA Tournament appearance each year. She was also the pitching coach at Illinois for one season.

== Coaching career ==
=== Mississippi State ===
On July 16, 2019, it was announced that Vann Stuedeman would not return as head coach.

=== Illinois ===
On August 25, 2022, Vann Stuedeman was announced as an assistant coach and pitching coach for the Illinois softball program. On May 24, 2023, Stuedeman departed from the softball staff at Illinois.

=== UTSA ===
On June 22, 2023, Stuedeman was announced as head coach of the UTSA Roadrunners softball program.

== Head coaching record ==
Record table
| Season | Team | Overall | Conference | Standing | Postseason |
|---|---|---|---|---|---|
Mississippi State (Southeastern Conference) (2012–2019)
| 2012 | Mississippi State | 33–24 | 12–16 | 7th | NCAA Regional |
| 2013 | Mississippi State | 32–24 | 8–16 | 10th | NCAA Regional |
| 2014 | Mississippi State | 39–21 | 10–14 | 10th | NCAA Regional |
| 2015 | Mississippi State | 36–21 | 10–14 | 9th | NCAA Regional |
| 2016 | Mississippi State | 26–31 | 3–21 | 12th | |
| 2017 | Mississippi State | 36–22 | 10–14 | 8th | NCAA Regional |
| 2018 | Mississippi State | 38–22 | 7–17 | 11th | NCAA Regional |
| 2019 | Mississippi State | 35–23 | 9–15 | 12th | NCAA Regional |
| Mississippi State: | | 275–188 (.594) | 69–127 (.352) | | |
UTSA Roadrunners (American Athletic Conference) (2024–Present)
| 2024 | UTSA | 15–42 | 5–22 | | |
| 2025 | UTSA | 21–34 | 6-21 | | |
| UTSA: | | 39–76 (.339) | 11–43 (.204) | | |
| Total: | | 311–264 (.541) | | | |
National champion Postseason invitational champion Conference regular season champion Conference regular season and conference tournament champion Division regular season champion Division regular season and conference tournament champion Conference tournament champion

== Personal ==
Stuedeman is a 1990 graduate of Vestavia Hills High School in Vestavia Hills, Alabama. She earned a Bachelor of Accounting degree from Huntingdon College in 1994 and a Master's in Elementary Education from the University of West Alabama in 1996. Both she and here sister, Lorraine “Les” Stuedeman, played softball at Huntingdon and are members of The Huntingdon College Athletic Hall of Fame.
