= Buchholz High School =

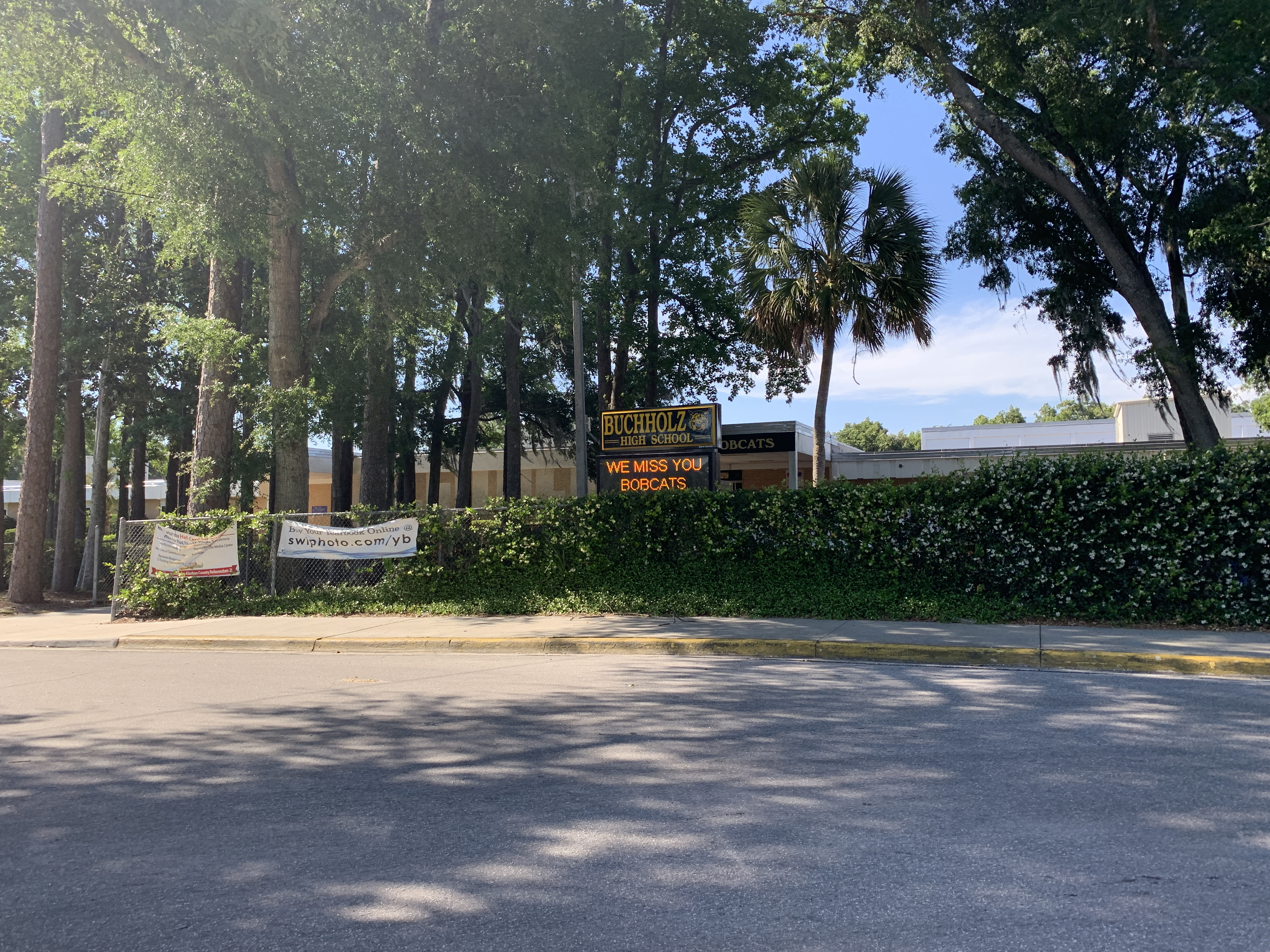
- Exterior of the main Buchholz High School building.

Location
- 5510 NW 27th Avenue; Alachua County; Gainesville, Florida 32606; United States; 29.67777°N 82.401367°W

Information
- School type: Public high school
- Opened: 1971
- School district: Alachua County Public Schools
- Superintendent: Kamela Patton
- Principal: Kevin Purvis
- Teaching staff: 90.20 (FTE)
- Grades: 9–12
- Enrollment: 2,444 (2023-2024)
- Student to teacher ratio: 27.10
- Hours in school day: 6
- Campus: Suburban
- Colors: Gold and black
- Mascot: Bobcat
- Rival: Gainesville High School; Eastside High School
- Website: www.alachuaschools.net/o/buchholz

F. W. Buchholz High School (commonly referred to as Buchholz (pronounced /bjuˈhoʊlds/) or BHS) is a high school in Gainesville, Florida, United States. Buchholz is one of seven high schools in Alachua County. Opened in January 1971, it is the largest school in Alachua County, with 2,444 students in the 2023–2024 school year. The Buchholz math team, formerly led by Will Frazer, was dubbed "America's greatest math team" in 2022 by The Wall Street Journal.

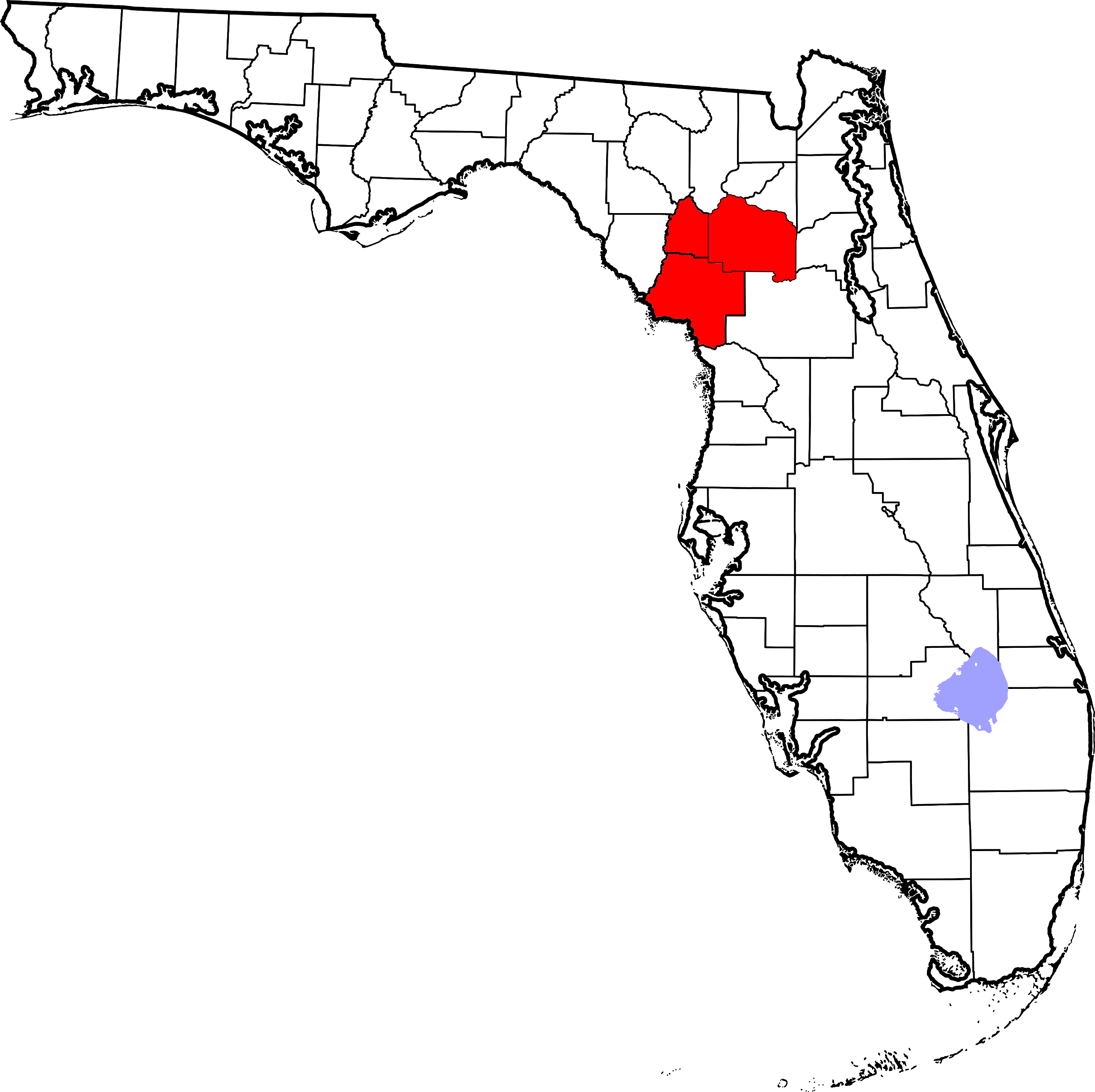
Locator map of the Gainesville Metropolitan Statistical Area in the northern part of the U.S. state of Florida.

== History ==
=== Establishment ===
The School Board of Alachua County began construction in 1968 for two new high schools in the rapidly expanding suburbs of Gainesville, Florida, to supplement the city's two existing public high schools. The new school in the northwest suburbs was named F.W. Buchholz, in honor of a distinguished Alachua County educator who had died a few years earlier, while the school in the eastern suburbs was named Eastside High School. The school board hoped to open both schools in September 1970 and to open them without the upper classes (grades 11 and 12) in order to allow the new schools to expand gradually, while also allowing students in the upper grades at Gainesville High School (GHS) to remain there for their final years. The slow roll-out at Buchholz and Eastside also spread the need to hire new teachers over several years, and allowed the school board to alter the grade structure in the junior and senior highs.

The school board began designating faculty members while the new buildings were under construction. Gainesville's predominately black high school, Lincoln High, was scheduled to close at the end of the 1969–70 academic year. Its football coach, Jessie Heard, was named in 1969 to be the head coach at Buchholz for the 1970 season. Coach Heard selected the school's colors of black and gold, because he was impressed with the black and gold uniforms worn by the Vanderbilt University football team when they came to Gainesville to play the Florida Gators on October 25, 1969. The freshman class of 1970–1971 voted on what the school's mascot would be; this was between a Bobcat and a Golden Knight.

Gainesville and Alachua County elementary schools served grades K-6 in the 1960s, while junior high schools consisted of grades 7, 8 and 9. The school board planned to realign junior high class distribution once Buchholz and Eastside opened, elevating grade 9 to the high schools. Further, because it would open the two new schools without upperclassmen, Buchholz and Eastside would temporarily serve as combined junior-senior highs. Alachua County moved away from the junior high structure in the late 1970s, opening new middle schools to serve grades 6, 7 and 8.

Construction of the sprawling Buchholz campus cost $2.4 million. Progress lagged behind schedule in spring and summer 1970, forcing the school board to develop an improvised class schedule for the fall. When the new school year resumed after Labor Day 1970, students living within the prospective Buchholz school zone who were entering grade 10 remained at Westwood Junior High School, which shifted to a split, double-shift schedule. Construction of Eastside High was also behind schedule, forcing its prospective students to remain at Howard Bishop Jr. High, which also operated on a double-shift schedule. Buchholz's first football team, a Junior Varsity squad, played its first season out of Westwood in fall 1970, utilizing two trailers (one for the offense and one for the defense.)

The new school building opened midway through the 1970–71 academic year as F.W. Buchholz Junior-Senior High, with Principal James "Jim" Temple. The school opened for its first classes at 7 am on Wednesday January 6, 1971. Principal Temple had received special permission from the school board to use Monday and Tuesday for teacher orientation and planning, before welcoming students on Wednesday: those two days were "made up" by canceling teacher work days planned for February 5 and 12. Because of overcrowding at GHS and a limited fleet of school buses, the school board was hard-pressed to develop a city- and county-wide bus plan capable of carrying out a court-ordered cross-bussing integration plan. Of the initial 1,160 students attending Buchholz that first year, nearly 800 rode buses. There simply were not enough buses to allow every school to begin classes at a "normal" hour, so Buchholz (and Westwood) were shifted to an "early" day schedule, with classes held from 7am to 1pm for the remainder of the academic year.

Rather than holding classes on a rigid schedule of six fixed periods, Buchholz experimented with an innovative system of modular scheduling. The school day was divided into 21 mods, each 17 minutes long, and class length varied from one to three mods, depending on subject matter and day of the week. The traditional ringing bell to signal the end (and start) of a "period" was replaced with an electronic chime for each mod. The modular day included blocks of free time for students, designated Individual Directed Study time (IDS). In a January 1971 interview for the Gainesville Sun newspaper, Principal Temple explained that in a conventional school with a normal six and one-half hour day, students spend 275 minutes per week in each of six classes. In its first year operating on an abbreviated, "early" schedule, Buchholz students spent 260 minutes per-week, per-class; this increased to 275 minutes the following school year, when the county's acquisition of a dozen new school buses allowed Buchholz to begin classes at a "normal" time.

In addition to the 9th and 10th graders brought over from Westwood, the school also included grades 7 and 8 for its first two years, because there was no grade 11 or 12. Grades 11 and 12 were added in succession in the following years, and the junior high was eliminated after the 1971–72 school year.

Buchholz High's first graduating class, the Charter Class of 1973, had about 265 students. The Charter Class had the unique experience of being the "Senior Class" at BHS for three years, and of having been de facto "seniors" for their last four years of public school (since starting 9th grade).

=== Namesake ===
Buchholz High School was named for Frederick "Fritz" William Buchholz (1885–1965), who came to Gainesville in 1914 as a teacher and coach of the football team at Gainesville High School (GHS). He was appointed principal of GHS in 1917 and served in the school system until his retirement in 1951, including as Superintendent of Alachua County Public Schools.

Buchholz's experience in coaching the GHS football team led to his instrumental role in the founding of the Florida High School Athletic Association (FHSAA), during a meeting of 29 high school principals from across the state, held at the University of Florida in Gainesville on April 9, 1920. He served as its vice president from 1920 to 1923, again from 1925 to 1929, as president of the FHSAA from 1929 to 1933, and, finally, as executive secretary (Commissioner) from 1933 to 1936. (In April 2001, Buchholz was posthumously elected to the FHSAA Hall of Fame.)

== Student body ==
Buchholz contains two magnet programs: the Academy of Finance and the Academy of Entrepreneurship. As a result, the school contains a credit union known as the "Bobcat Branch," which is a division of the Florida Credit Union, and operated by students in the Academy of Finance. The "Spirit Spot" is a retail outlet whose products are envisioned and marketed by the Academy of Entrepreneurship.

The students hail from all over the city due to their county school board's zoning laws, and represent the vast ethnic and religious diversity that is ever-present in Gainesville.

A vast array of classes and activities are available to the student body, from "Student Cabinet" (a student-run organization designed to involve students in the affairs of the school) to Advanced Placement courses. Buchholz is also known locally for its school spirit in all facets of student activity within the school.

Students enroll from grades 9 through 12.

== Programs ==
=== Golden Regiment and Band ===
In November 2000, the Golden Regiment marched in the Macy's Thanksgiving Day Parade in New York and was the featured band performing live on NBC's Today Show. In 2008, the Golden Regiment progressed towards the Florida State Championships for the first time in history, claiming the fourth-place trophy in 5A category on November 22. In 2013, the band placed first in class 4A with their show "Carmen 2.0". The next year, the band won the same champion title with their show "Four", a depiction of the four seasons. In 2009, the Buchholz Wind Symphony performed at the Midwest Clinic. They also performed at Midwest in 2014.

The Wind Symphony (the principal concert ensemble) performed at the College Band Directors National Association and National Band Association Southern Regional Conference in Atlanta, Georgia in February 2002. In December 2002, they performed at the Midwest Clinic, an International Band and Orchestra Conference in Chicago, Illinois. In 2006, the Wind Symphony was invited to the Grand National Adjudicators Invitational in Chattanooga, Tennessee. The Wind Symphony was awarded Superior Scores from all adjudicators as well as the First Place Honor Band Award. The French Horns and the entire Woodwind Section were awarded Outstanding Sections.

In 2009 the Wind Symphony traveled to New York City to perform in Carnegie Hall. The band received the Gold Level award for its performance. In the 2013 season, the band won the Florida Marching Band Coalition State Finals Competition in class 4A, with their show "Carmen 3.0". Following this, the Buchholz Wind Symphony performed for the FMEA State Convention, CBDNA/NBA Southern Division Conference, and the ABA National Convention. The subsequent marching season, the Golden Regiment again won the FMBC State competition with their show "4: A musical and visual depiction of the four seasons of the year." In 2014 the Wind Symphony won the Midwest Clinic.

In 2019 the Golden Regiment was the overall grand champion in the 2019 Crown Jewel Marching Band Festival.

=== Theater program ===
Buchholz High School is also home to an active theater program. Under the guidance of Ted Lewis as of 2018, this program teaches students the ins and outs of what it takes to put on a show. From creating a hand-crafted set to acting out characters in a musical, the Buchholz's theater club gives students real experience in the world of show business. This program is known to put on a wide variety of content, ranging from Shakespearean plays like The Taming of the Shrew to 2018's performance of The Evil Dead: The Musical. The Buchholz Players also perform at the district and state levels of competition.

== School sports and competitions ==
Buchholz has teams in the following sports: cross-country, track and field, soccer, lacrosse, basketball, football, Baseball/Softball, wrestling, girls' volleyball, men and women's swimming and diving, men's and women's golf, tennis, and weightlifting.

=== Championships ===
- The math team, formerly led by Will Frazer, was called "America's greatest math team" by The Wall Street Journal. Frazer led the math team to win 16 out of 17 consecutive Mu Alpha Theta national championships from 2007 to 2023. Frazer left Buchholz to open an independent K-12 institution called the Frazer School in 2024.
- The girls' cross country team won the 2005 (4-A), 2021 (4-A) and 2022 (4-A) state championships.
- The boys' track and field teams won the 1993 (4-A), 1994 (4-A), 1995 (5-A), and 2004 (4-A) state championships
- The boys' cross country team won the 1989 (3-A), 1990 (3-A), 1993 (4-A) and 1994 (5-A) state championships
- The football team won the 1990 state championship.
- The girls' soccer team won the 1983 State Championship.
- The girls' volleyball team won the 2007 6-A state girls' volleyball title.
- The girls' swimming/diving team won the 2009 3-A state title.
- The girls' basketball team won the 2013 7-A state title.
- The marching band won the 2013-2014 and 2014-2015 4-A state title.

== Notable alumni ==
- Dan Berger, economist and president and chief executive officer of the National Association of Federally-Insured Credit Unions.
- Kevin Bradshaw, NCAA basketball record-holder for points in a single game, player in the Israeli Basketball Premier League
- Lisa Nicole Carson, television and film actress
- Malcolm Gets, actor, best known for playing Richard in the American television sitcom Caroline in the City (1995–99)
- Myles Graham, college football linebacker for the Florida Gators
- Todd Harrison, former NFL tight end for the Tampa Bay Buccaneers and the Minnesota Vikings
- Ivy Joe Hunter, former American football fullback for the Indianapolis Colts and New England Patriots
- Tammy Jackson, former professional basketball player for the Houston Comets
- Doug Johnson, former American football quarterback for the Atlanta Falcons, Jacksonville Jaguars, Cincinnati Bengals, Cleveland Browns, and the Tennessee Titans
- Billy Latsko, former college football player for the University of Florida and NFL Fullback for the Carolina Panthers, Pittsburgh Steelers, and the San Diego Chargers
- Fred Marion, former American football player for the New England Patriots
- Vernon Maxwell, former professional basketball player for the San Antonio Spurs, Houston Rockets, Philadelphia 76ers, Orlando Magic, Charlotte Hornets, Sacramento Kings, Seattle SuperSonics, and the Dallas Mavericks
- Chrissy Metz, actress and singer, Emmy and Golden Globe Award nominee
- Andrew Miller, former professional baseball pitcher for the Detroit Tigers, Florida Marlins, Boston Red Sox, Baltimore Orioles, New York Yankees, Cleveland Indians, and the St. Louis Cardinals
- Susan Louise O'Connor, film and stage actress
- Justin Rascati, American football coach and former player
- Chris Rumph II, American football outside linebacker for the Los Angeles Chargers
- Thomas Sanders, singer, actor, scriptwriter, and internet personality
- Ben Shelton, professional tennis player
- Allison Silverman, head writer and executive producer for The Colbert Report.
- Lamar Thomas, American football coach and former player for the Tampa Bay Buccaneers and the Miami Dolphins
