= Mu Alpha Theta =

International honor society for mathematics

- ΜΑΘ
- The ΜΑΘ logo is a visual demonstration of the Pythagorean theorem
- Founded: 1957; 69 years ago University of Oklahoma
- Type: Honor
- Affiliation: Independent
- Status: Active
- Emphasis: Mathematics; High school and 2-yr Colleges
- Scope: International
- Colors: Turquoise blue and Gold
- Symbol: Pythagorean theorem
- Publication: The Mathematical Log
- Chapters: 2,420
- Members: 100,000 lifetime
- Headquarters: c/o University of Oklahoma; 3200 Marshall Avenue, Suite 150; Norman, Oklahoma 73019; United States
- Website: mualphatheta.org

Mu Alpha Theta (ΜΑΘ) is an International mathematics honor society for high school and two-year college students. As of June 2015, it served over 108,000 student members in over 2,200 chapters in the United States and 20 foreign countries. Its main goals are to inspire keen interest in mathematics, develop strong scholarship in the subject, and promote the enjoyment of mathematics in high school and two-year college students. Its name is a rough transliteration of math into Greek (Mu Alpha Theta).

== History ==
The Mu Alpha Theta National High School and Three-Year College Mathematics Honor Society was founded in 1957 by Dr. Richard V. Andree and his wife, Josephine Andree, at the University of Oklahoma. In Andree's words, Mu Alpha Theta is "an organization dedicated to promoting scholarship in mathematics and establishing math as an integral part of high school and junior college education".

Pi Mu Epsilon, the National Collegiate Honor Society of Mathematics, contributed funds for the organization's initial expenses; the University of Oklahoma provided space, clerical help, and technical assistance. The Mathematical Association of America, a primary sponsor of the organization since 1958, and the National Council of Teachers of Mathematics nominated the first officers and Board of Governors. The Society for Industrial and Applied Mathematics became an official sponsor in 1998, followed by The American Mathematical Association of Two-Year Colleges in 2002.

The official journal of Mu Alpha Theta, The Mathematical Log, was first issued in 1957 on mimeograph and was in printed form starting in 1958. It was published four times during the school year until 2002 and featured articles, reports, news, and problems for students.

As of June 2015, Mu Alpha Theta served over 108,000 student members in over 2,200 chapters in the United States and 20 foreign countries. Its headquarters are located in Norman, Oklahoma.

== Symbols ==
The name Mu Alpha Theta is a rough transliteration of math into Greek (Mu Alpha Theta). Its colors are turquoise blue and gold. Its symbol is the Pythagorean theorem.

== Activities ==
=== Awards and scholarships ===
Mu Alpha Theta presents several awards, including the Kalin Award to outstanding students. The Andree award is awarded to students who plan to become mathematics teachers. Chapter sponsors are also recognized by the Regional Sponsor Award, the Sister Scholastica, and the Huneke Award for the most dedicated sponsors. The Rubin Award is presented to a chapter doing volunteer work to help others to enjoy mathematics. Mu Alpha Theta presents numerous scholarships and grants to its members.

=== National conventions ===
The first Mu Alpha Theta national convention was held at Trinity University in San Antonio, Texas in 1968. Each year the convention brings together hundreds of teachers and students from across the country for five days of math-related events. The location of each national convention is announced at the convention held the previous year.

Year	Host city	National champions	References
2026	Frisco, TX	Frazer School	
2025	Orlando, FL	Frazer School	
2024	Las Vegas, NV	Buchholz High School	
2023	Fayetteville, AR	Buchholz High School	
2022	Washington, D.C.	Buchholz High School	
2021	Virtual and In-Person	Buchholz High School	
2019	Las Vegas, NV	Buchholz High School	
2018	Colorado Springs, CO	Buchholz High School	
2017	Buffalo, NY	American Heritage School	
2016	St. Louis, MO	Buchholz High School	
2015	Salt Lake City, UT	Buchholz High School	
2014	Orlando, FL	Buchholz High School	
2013	San Diego, CA	Buchholz High School	
2012	Boston, MA	Buchholz High School	
2011	Dallas, TX	Buchholz High School	
2010	Washington, D.C.	Buchholz High School	
2009	Knoxville, TN	Buchholz High School	
2008	Sacramento, CA	Buchholz High School	
2007	Tampa, FL	Buchholz High School	
2006	Fort Collins, CO	Vestavia Hills High School	
2005	Honolulu, HI	Vestavia Hills High School	
2004	Huntsville, AL	Marjory Stoneman Douglas High School	
2003	Atlanta, GA	Marjory Stoneman Douglas High School	
2002	Starkville, MS	Marjory Stoneman Douglas High School	
2001	Denver, CO	Vestavia Hills High School	
2000	San Diego, CA	Marjory Stoneman Douglas High School	
1999	Gatlinburg, TN	Vestavia Hills High School	
1998	Chicago, IL	Vestavia Hills High School	
1997	Seattle, WA	Vestavia Hills High School	
1996	Orlando, FL	Marjory Stoneman Douglas High School	
1995	Carrabassett Valley, ME	Vestavia Hills High School	
1994	New Orleans, LA	Vestavia Hills High School	
1993	Laie, HI	Vestavia Hills High School	
1992	Princeton, NJ	Vestavia Hills High School	
1991	Huntsville, AL	Vestavia Hills High School	
1990	DeKalb, IL	Vestavia Hills High School	
1989	Tampa, FL	Vestavia Hills High School	
1988	Knoxville, TN	Vestavia Hills High School	
1987	Seattle, WA	Vestavia Hills High School	
1986	Coral Gables, FL		
1985	Honolulu, HI	Virgil I. Grissom High School	
1984	New Orleans, LA	Virgil I. Grissom High School	
1983	Norman, OK	Virgil I. Grissom High School	
1982	St. Louis, MO	Virgil I. Grissom High School	
1981	Los Angeles, CA	Virgil I. Grissom High School	
1980	Atlanta, GA	Virgil I. Grissom High School	
1979	Athens, AL		
1978	Stevens Point, WI		
1977	Dubuque, IA	New Trier East High School	
1976	West Chester, PA		
1974	Fayetteville, AR	Thomas Jefferson High School	
1973	Milwaukee, WI		
1972	New Orleans, LA		
1970	Pittsburgh, PA		
1968	San Antonio, TX		

== Competitions ==
ΜΑΘ is primarily a venue for mathematical competition. Different competitions have varying ways to test the student's mathematical knowledge.

Competition is divided into six levels or divisions, calculus, pre-calculus, algebra II, geometry, algebra I, and statistics. At state and national competitions, only three levels are used: Theta (geometry and Algebra II), Alpha (pre-calculus), and calculus. There is only a Mu division at the national level. Additionally, there are usually open tests, which can be taken by students from any division, including Statistics, number theory, and the history of math. Most students start at the level of math that they are currently enrolled in or have last taken and progress to higher levels. A student can begin at another level, but it must be higher. The only exception to this is that students enrolled in either Algebra II or geometry can take whichever of the two they want because not all schools offer these courses in the same sequence. Students competing in a higher level, such as pre-calculus cannot then go back and compete at the algebra II level. This encourages students to compete with other students who are taking classes of similar mathematical difficulty.

=== Structure of competitions ===
==== Individual test ====
Each student who chooses to participate in a competition takes an "individual" test that corresponds to his or her level of competition. All competitions include this feature. Most individual tests consist of 30 multiple-choice questions (not including tie-breakers), A-E, where answer choice "E" is "None of the Above", or "None of These Answers"; abbreviated NOTA. Students are typically allotted 1 hour for the entire test. In most states they are graded on the following scale: +4 points for a correct answer, −1 points for an incorrect answer that was chosen, and 0 points if the question was left blank. This scoring system makes guessing statistically neutral. 120 points is considered a perfect score. Some competitions (e.g., Nationals and—as of the 2012/13 season—Florida) use alternate but equivalent systems of scoring, such as +5 for a correct answer, 0 for an incorrect answer, and +1 for a blank. A perfect score under this system would be 150. Calculators are never allowed to be used in competitions; the statistics division is the exception to this rule. This rule is in place for multiple reasons, the first being that modern calculators may include the ability to solve entire problems without any analysis of the equation, which would mean that students not having the mathematical knowledge but the ability to use a calculator could unfairly get problems correct. The second reason is so problems can remain arithmetically simple, in other words, so that a problem can utilize simple numbers and focus on the concepts without worrying that a calculator would give an advantage of some sort. Statistics is an exception because the field of statistics utilizes calculators and computers tremendously and not allowing calculators would require the students to carry out unavoidable tedious calculations by hand, thus taking away focus from the concepts.

Tie-breakers are only done for students who tie but do not get a perfect score. They are sometimes used in the case when money or prizes are being distributed to the winners of the competition, and a tiebreaker will be used even if both students have a perfect score. Tie-breakers are conducted according to the "sudden death" method. For example, in a tie-breaker, if student A scored the same as student B, and each missed 1 question, the student who missed question #5 will win over the student who missed question #3; students who start missing questions last are ranked higher, given the same scores. If the sudden death method doesn't resolve the tie, in other words, both students have the same answers, then a tie-breaker question is made and the person to turn in the correct answer the fastest wins the tie. If both get it wrong or if both turn in the correct answer at the same time then the process is repeated until the tie is resolved. All students who get a perfect score are considered to place 1st. Due to the large number of students, as compared to a typical high school classroom, who participate in competitions, scantrons are used as answer sheets; their main advantage is that they can be graded by a computer. These are similar in type to the answer sheets used in standardized tests such as the SAT and the ACT.

==== Team round ====
In most competitions, the sponsor or "coach" is allowed to select 4 students per division to participate in a "team" test (formally called "Team Bowl".) Each team member sits with the rest of their team and is allowed to communicate and collaborate during the team round. A few competitions do not allow the team members to sit together; rather every member of the division takes the team test alone and without conversing, then the 4 highest scores are averaged together; these 4 people are on the team. Some competitions allow each school to have a second team for each division, "Team II". When there is enough space, schools may take advantage of this multiple-team rule and have up to four teams in one division's team round, though only the first two teams are considered for the Sweepstakes.

The grading scale is different for the team round. Questions are given one by one, whereas in the individual round students are given the test in its entirety. There are usually 12 questions (not including tie-breakers), and each team has 4 minutes to answer the question. If they answer the question correctly before the first minute, they receive 16 points, if they answer before the second they receive 12 points, before 3 minutes, 8 points, 4 points before 4 minutes has expired, and 0 points for anything, even the correct answer, after 4 minutes. In some competitions, a sliding scale is used. For example, if no team turned in an answer to a particular question in the first minute but another team answered correctly in the second minute, the team will be awarded the full 16 points even though they answered it in the second minute; a third minute-answering team would get twelve points; and the fourth minute-answering team would get eight points. The answer is usually written in and the students are not penalized for guessing. The team score from the team round is then summed up with the score of the individuals on the team to acquire the total team score used in rankings. The same calculator rule in the individual round is in effect in the team round; with statistics still the exception to the rule.

==== Ciphering ====
States and nationals include a ciphering round that is not present at other competitions. Students are given a stack of ten questions. They have three minutes to complete each question. For solving it in the first minute, they receive twelve points, during the second minute, eight points, and during the third minute, four points. At the competitions with this test, it is included along with the individual test scores and team score for the total team score.

==== Disputes ====
For fifteen minutes after the individual round and fifteen minutes after the team round students can file what are known as "Disputes". If a student is confident that they arrived at the correct answer and that the given answer is incorrect they can fill out a dispute form showing their work and explaining why their answer is the correct one. A resolution committee then reviews all disputes submitted and either denies them or accepts them based on the correctness of the student's reasoning. In this case, the official answer is changed and each student/team's score is recalculated using the new answer. Most competitions have an errata sheet and verification forms to provide a central location for accepted and denied disputes.

Disputes can change the accepted answer, accept two answers if they are both valid according to competition rules, or more rarely throw out a flawed question. There is an extremely rare status given to a dispute that is called a "unique interpretation". This occurs when a student interprets a problem in a drastically different, yet completely legitimate, way than the problem intended and thus changes the problem entirely. In this case only that student is given credit for their answer and the original answer remains the same for the rest of the competitors.

==== Sweepstakes ====
"Sweepstakes" awards are given to the top (normally ten) schools whose students average the best performance in each test or division. Sweepstakes points are awarded on a transformed t-score based system, which awards points not only for relative place but for relative scores. Students or teams who win by a large margin, relative to the standard deviation of the rest of the group, contribute higher t-scores to their teams. T-scores from each test and team round are weighted and added to comprise the total sweepstakes score of a school.

Note that the T-scores used in scoring are a transformation of the statistical T-score:

$T_{scoring} = 50 + 10(T_{stats})$

Some tests, such as trivia competitions, may be excluded from sweepstakes calculations. They include the Gemini, Mental Math, and Speed Math competitions available at some States' and the National competitions.

== See also ==
- Kappa Mu Epsilon, ΚΜΕ (mathematics)
- Mu Sigma Rho, ΜΣΡ (statistics)
- Pi Mu Epsilon, ΠΜΕ (mathematics)
