= Vestavia Hills City Schools =

School district in Alabama

Location
- Vestavia Hills, Alabama Alabama United States

District information
- Type: Public
- Motto: Learning Without Limits
- Grades: K–12
- Established: 1970
- Superintendent: Todd Freeman
- Schools: 8
- Budget: $69.6 million
- NCES District ID: 0103430

Students and staff
- Students: 6,762
- Teachers: 423
- Staff: 342

Other information
- Website: http://www.vestavia.k12.al.us/

The Vestavia Hills City School System is the school system of the Birmingham, Alabama, suburb of Vestavia Hills. Vestavia Hills City Schools serve 6,965 students and employ 947 faculty and staff. The district includes five elementary schools, two middle schools, and one high school. Vestavia Hills City Schools was led by William T. Clark as their first superintendent from 1970 to 1979, and their current superintendent is Todd Freeman.

== Student Profile ==
Vestavia Hills City Schools serve all students living within Vestavia Hills city limits. The student population is 83% white, 8% African-American, 5% Asian, and 3% Hispanic. Surrounding Jefferson County is 53% White 42% Black and 1.4% Asian. Approximately 10% of students qualify for free or reduced price lunch, a proxy for poverty. Two percent are English Language Learners (ELL), and 7% have Individualized Education Programs.

Vestavia Hills City Schools have an overall graduation rate of 99%. Approximately 95% of Vestavia Hills students meet or exceed state proficiency standards in mathematics, and about 97% meet or exceed standards in reading.

== Schools ==
The system consists of nine schools: five elementary schools, two middle schools, a ninth grade campus, and one high school.

=== Elementary schools ===
- Vestavia Hills Elementary East
- Vestavia Hills Elementary West
- Vestavia Hills Elementary Cahaba Heights
- Vestavia Hills Elementary Liberty Park
- Vestavia Hills Elementary Dolly Ridge

=== Middle schools ===
- Louis Pizitz Middle School
- Liberty Park Middle School

=== High schools ===
- Vestavia Hills High School Freshman Campus
- Vestavia Hills High School

== Mascot Controversy ==
In the wake of the Charleston church shooting in June 2015, The Birmingham News highlighted this racially charged history and called for a removal of the Vestavia Hills mascot, the Rebel Man, which resembled the same mascot used by the University of Mississippi until 2003. Meanwhile, the school superintendent called it 'a "point of contention for some members" of the community.' By early July 2015, some Vestavia Hills residents wrote an op-ed in The Birmingham News calling on the school board to change its name. By the middle of July 2015, comedian John Oliver made fun of the claim that it was "heritage, not hate" on national television. He argued, "Your logo is a plantation owner. [...] And saying that the image of a plantation owner is not used in a racist way is a bit like arguing the Hitachi magic wand is only used as a back massager."

The Vestavia Hills School System decided to keep the Rebels name but initiate a "rebranding" process.

As of the 2016-2017 school year, the Rebel Man mascot is no longer being used by the high school.
