= Kittinger =

Kittinger can refer to:

In business:

- The Kittinger Company, a furniture company based in Buffalo, New York, United States

People with the surname Kittinger:

- Joseph Kittinger (1928–2022), United States Air Force pilot, set parachute and balloon records for altitude
- Jo Kittinger (born 1955), American children's book author
