= Marcia Gumpertz =

American statistician

Marcia Lynn Gumpertz is an American statistician known for her research on agricultural statistics, spatial analysis, the design of experiments, and plant disease epidemiology. She has also studied employment issues for women and members of underrepresented minorities in science and technology. She is a professor of statistics at North Carolina State University.

== Education and career ==
Gumpertz earned a bachelor's degree in philosophy from the University of California, Berkeley in 1973, and a master's degree in statistics from Oregon State University in 1979. She completed her Ph.D. at North Carolina State University in 1989. Her dissertation, Simple Estimators for the Linear Random Coefficient Regression Model and the Nonlinear Model with Variance Components, was jointly supervised by Sastry Pantula and John Rawlings.

She worked as a scientist for Northrop Services Inc., in Oregon, from 1980 to 1984, doing research for the Environmental Protection Agency, and joined the North Carolina State University on completing her doctorate in 1989. At North Carolina State University, she has also served as assistant vice provost for faculty diversity.

== Book ==
With Francis G. Giesbrecht, Gumpertz is the co-author of the book Planning, Construction, and Statistical Analysis of Comparative Experiments (Wiley, 2004).

== Recognition ==
Gumpertz was president of Mu Sigma Rho, the US national statistics honor society, for 2004–2006. She was elected as a Fellow of the American Statistical Association in 2006, and given the Distinguished Achievement Award of the American Statistical Association Section on Statistics and the Environment in 2008.
