= Steven Black (gridiron football) =

American gridiron football player (born 1986)

No. 16
- Position: Wide receiver

Personal information
- Born: December 10, 1986 (age 39); Birmingham, Alabama
- Listed height: 6 ft 3 in (1.91 m)
- Listed weight: 210 lb (95 kg)

Career information
- High school: Vestavia Hills (AL)
- College: Memphis
- NFL draft: 2009: undrafted

Career history
- Pittsburgh Steelers (2009)*; BC Lions (2010–2011); Spokane Shock (2012–2013); Pittsburgh Power (2013); Spokane Shock (2014)*
- * Offseason or practice squad member only

Career CFL statistics
- Receptions: 24
- Yards: 387
- Average: 16.1
- Long: 65
- Touchdowns: 5
- Stats at CFL.ca (archived)

Career AFL statistics
- Receptions: 90
- Yards: 976
- Touchdowns: 18
- Tackles: 12
- Stats at ArenaFan.com

Steven Black (born December 11, 1986) is a former professional American football wide receiver. Black signed as a free agent with the BC Lions on May 19, 2010. He played college football for the Memphis Tigers.

== College career ==
Black played collegiately at Memphis.

== Professional career ==
=== BC Lions ===
Black was signed by the BC Lions of the Canadian Football League on May 19, 2010.

=== Spokane Shock ===
Black was a member of the Spokane Shock of the Arena Football League in 2012. Black re-signed with Shock for the 2013 season. Black was released on July 3, 2013.

=== Pittsburgh Power ===
Black was claimed off of reassigned by the Pittsburgh Power on July 5, 2013, and was placed on the refused to report list on July 6.

=== Return to Spokane ===
Black was assigned to the Shock on May 15, 2014.
