= Vestavia Hills High School =

Coordinates: 33°25′12″N 86°46′49″W

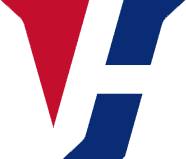

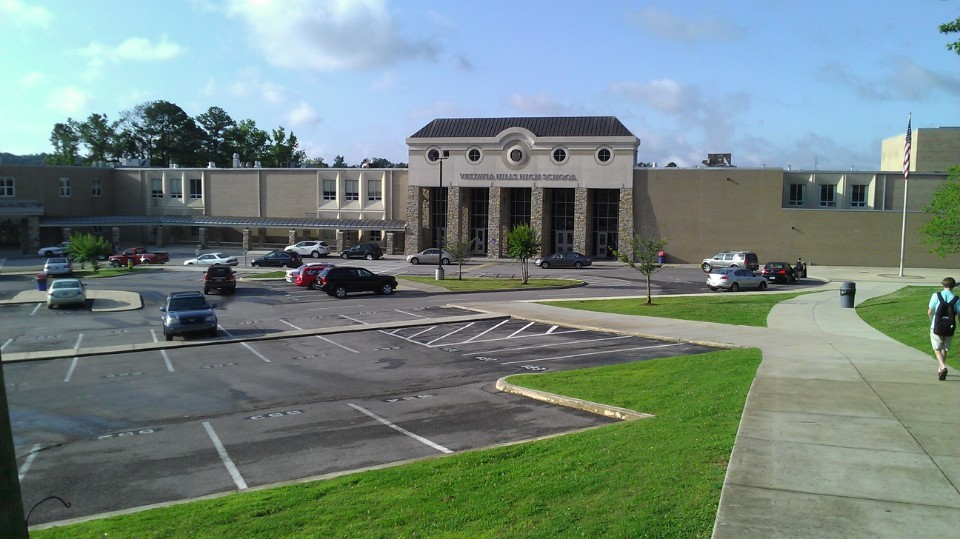

Location
- 2235 Lime Rock Road; Vestavia Hills, Alabama 35216; United States

Information
- Type: Public
- Established: 1970 (56 years ago)
- CEEB code: 012768
- Principal: Blair Inabinet
- Teaching staff: 115.50 (FTE)
- Grades: 9–12
- Enrollment: 1,624 (2023-2024)
- Student to teacher ratio: 14.06
- Colors: Red and blue
- Team name: Rebels
- Newspaper: The Pillar
- Yearbook: The Reveille
- Website: vhhs.vhcs.us

Vestavia Hills High School (VHHS), founded in 1970, is a public high school in Vestavia Hills, Alabama, a suburb of Birmingham, Alabama, United States. It is part of the Vestavia Hills City Schools.

A number of teachers in the school are Nationally Board Certified, and two are nationally recognized James Madison Scholars.

Vestavia Hills High School has a strong reputation for academic success with 24 National Merit Semifinalists in the 2025-26 school year, the highest in the state of Alabama.

== History ==
The land was acquired by Louis Pizitz, a Polish immigrant who settled in Birmingham in 1889. Pizitz lived here with his wife, Minnie and their son, Hortense. After their death, their son Hortense sold the land to the City of Vestavia Hills in the 1960s.

The school was built in the 1970s, in the context of the establishment of segregation academies in the 1970s, which enabled white children to segregate themselves from black children, who remained in public schools. Until 2016 the school mascot, known as Rebel Man, was a plantation owner. The school "picked a Confederate Flag-waving Civil War Rebel because it saw itself as rebellious."

In the wake of the Charleston church shooting in June 2015, The Birmingham News highlighted this history and called for a removal of the mascot. Meanwhile, the school superintendent called it 'a "point of contention for some members" of the community'. By early July 2015, some Vestavia Hills residents wrote an op-ed in The Birmingham News calling on the school board to change its name. By the middle of July 2015, comedian John Oliver made fun of the claim that it was "heritage, not hate" on national television. He argued, "Your logo is a plantation owner. [...] And saying that the image of a plantation owner is not used in a racist way is a bit like arguing the Hitachi magic wand is only used as a back massager."

The Vestavia Hills City Schools System decided to keep the Rebels name but initiate a "rebranding" process. The new branding was approved by the school board on May 18, 2016. The new branding replaced the objectionable mascot and instituted the new slogan "You play one Rebel you play us all."

== Academics ==
Vestavia has 150 courses available on yearly basis. Vestavia offers a number of AP courses—including World History (Modern), U.S. History, European History, Human Geography, English Language & Lit., Calculus AB, Calculus BC, Computer Science Principles, Computer Science A, Psychology, Physics 1, Statistics, Biology, Chemistry, French, Latin, Spanish, German, Government, Microeconomics, Macroeconomics, Studio Art, Environmental Science, and Comparative Government. Vestavia also offers Honors courses for all core subjects to all grades. Dual Enrollment classes are available for both English and Math.

The school has a music department. It publishes a digital newspaper, Pillar, and a literary and visual arts magazine, The Muse.

=== Achievements ===
The school was recognized with the national Blue Ribbon School of Excellence by the United States Department of Education in both 1991 and 2009.

The debate team has won seven national championships and multiple state championships, with the added distinction of being the first team in history to win both Lincoln-Douglas Debate and Policy Debate in the National Speech and Debate Association's National Speech and Debate Tournament. In addition, only one other school has won two national championships in Lincoln-Douglas debate at the Tournament of Champions national high school debate tournament.

The math team amassed 15 first place finishes at the Mu Alpha Theta national championships from 1987 to 2006. Over the same period, the team dominated most regional events throughout the Southeast, including four victories at the Furman University Wylie Mathematics Tournament from 1999 to 2004.

In 2008, the school won the "Adam Smith Division" in the Council for Economic Education's National Economics Challenge, and its students finished runner up in the national finals of the 22nd annual We the People: The Citizen and the Constitution competition in 2009. Also, in 2023, the school was the runner-up in the Council for Economic Education's Nationwide Personal Finance Competition.

== Athletics ==
Vestavia Hills High School fields varsity teams in football, cheerleading, basketball, baseball, soccer, wrestling, golf, tennis, softball, swimming, volleyball, cross country, flag football, and indoor and outdoor track and field.

VHHS has won AHSAA state championships in the following sports:

- Baseball (1991, 1992, 1994, 1995, 1996, 1997, 1998, 1999, 2000)
- Boys' Basketball (1992, 2009)
- Girls' Basketball (1987)
- Boys' Cross Country (1987, 2013)
- Girls' Cross Country (1981)
- Football (1980, 1998)
- Boys' Golf (1991, 1994)
- Girls' Golf (1973, 1974)
- Girls' Indoor Track (2005)
- Boys' Soccer (1991, 1995, 2013, 2014)
- Girls' Soccer (2001, 2005, 2007)
- Boys' Tennis (1995, 2011, 2012, 2013, 2014)
- Girls' Tennis (1989, 1991, 1992, 1993, 1998, 1999, 2007, 2008, 2009, 2010, 2013, 2016)
- Boys' Outdoor Track & Field (2008)
- Wrestling (1976, 1985, 1986, 1991, 1993, 1994, 1998, 1999, 2000, 2001, 2007, 2008, 2009, 2016, 2017)

Buddy Anderson Field (at Thompson Reynolds Stadium) is home of the Vestavia Hills Rebels football team. The field is named after former head coach Buddy Anderson. Anderson started coaching at Vestavia in 1972, and was the head coach from 1978 to 2020.

== Performing arts ==
VHHS has a competitive show choir, "Singers".

== Notable alumni ==
- Colter Bean (1995), Major League Baseball pitcher (New York Yankees)
- Steven Black, professional football player
- Jarred Brookins (2009), Oregon State Beavers men's soccer head coach
- Will Brooks (2020), college football safety
- Chris Hammond (1984), Major League Baseball pitcher
- Josh Hancock (1996), former Major League Baseball pitcher (St. Louis Cardinals)
- Trey Hardee (2002), track and field athlete, Olympian
- Smylie Kaufman (2010), professional golfer and winner on PGA Tour
- Jo Kittinger (1974), children's book author
- Rebecca Moore, Miss Alabama USA 2006
- Michael Papajohn (1983), actor, film producer and stunt performer
- Jordan Ross (2023), college football defensive end for the LSU Tigers football team
- Mike Shaw, member of the Alabama House of Representatives
- Vann Stuedeman, head coach of the Mississippi State Lady Bulldogs softball team
- Jordan Swing, professional basketball player
- Ethan Strand, track and field athlete
- Abbie Stockard (2021), Miss America 2025
