= Todd Harrison (American football) =

American football player (born 1969)

No. 89
- Position: Tight end

Personal information
- Born: March 20, 1969 (age 57); Gainesville, Florida, U.S.
- Listed height: 6 ft 4 in (1.93 m)
- Listed weight: 260 lb (118 kg)

Career information
- High school: Buchholz (Gainesville)
- College: NC State
- NFL draft: 1992: 5th round, 134th overall pick

Career history
- Chicago Bears (1992)*; Tampa Bay Buccaneers (1992); Minnesota Vikings (1993)
- * Offseason or practice squad member only
- Stats at Pro Football Reference

Todd Lewis Harrison (born March 20, 1969) is an American former professional football player who was a tight end in the National Football League (NFL).

Harrison was born in Gainesville, Florida and attended Buchholz High School. He played college football for the NC State Wolfpack and was selected by the Chicago Bears in the fifth round of the 1992 NFL draft, the 134th overall pick. He played one game in the NFL, playing for the Tampa Bay Buccaneers in 1992.

Harrison was also signed with the Minnesota Vikings in 1993.

He has two older siblings, a brother named Keith and a sister named Dianne.
