= Richard V. Andree =

American mathematician and computer scientist (1919–1987)

Richard Vernon Andree
- Scientific career
- Fields: Computer science
- Workplaces: University of Oklahoma

Richard Vernon Andree (16 December 1919 – 8 May 1987) was an American mathematician and computer scientist.

Andree taught at the University of Oklahoma for 37 years. He wrote a book on abstract algebra entitled Selections From Modern Abstract Algebra which was first published in 1958. Andree and his students developed the ALPS programming language for the Bendix G-15 computer.

Andree was influential in the national collegiate mathematical organization Pi Mu Epsilon, having served as President, Secretary-Treasurer, and editor of their Journal. The Richard V. Andree Awards are given by the organization to undergraduates whose articles in the Pi Mu Epsilon Journal have been judged as containing the best content for the year.
