= Jo Kittinger =

American writer

Jo Linda Susenbach Kittinger (born October 7, 1955) is an Alabama native known for her many children's books and for her participation in many local, national and international organizations. She is an active member of the Leaky Pens (a bi-weekly book authors group), and SCBWI (The Society of Children's Book Writers and Illustrators). Kittinger served as a Co-Regional Advisor of the Southern Breeze chapter (Alabama, Georgia and Mississippi) of SCBWI for eleven years and now holds the rank of Regional Advisor Emeritus.

== Biography ==
Kittinger was born October 7, 1955, in Miami, Florida. She is an alumna of Vestavia Hills High School and of the University of Montevallo where she received a Bachelor of Fine Arts, summa cum laude.

Kittinger's interest in publishing began early. She was editor of her high school yearbook and began submitting original craft designs for publication shortly after college. Her projects may be found in numerous books and magazines published through Oxmoor House Books and Heritage House Publishing. Kittinger began writing for children in 1991. In addition to her books, Jo has published articles in various books and magazines including Pockets, Boys Quest and The Flicker. She has written numerous feature articles which have appeared on the Just For Kids page of the Birmingham News and a number of items for Harcourt Brace Educational Measurement and CTB/McGraw-Hill.

== Awards ==
Rosa's Bus: the Ride to Civil Rights was honored with a Crystal Kite award through the SCBWI. The House on Dirty-Third Street was the recipient of a Christopher Award in 2013. This picture book also received the first ever Social Justice Literature Award from the International Reading Association in 2013.

== Bibliography - books published in the United States ==
- 2019 - Light - Children's Press/Scholastic - ISBN 978-0-53113-140-4
- 2018 - South Dakota - Children's Press/Scholastic - ISBN 978-0-53123-580-5
- 2018 - Alabama - Children's Press/Scholastic - ISBN 978-0-53123-161-6
- 2014 - The Beauty of Dreams - American Bar Association Publishers - ISBN 978-1-62722-693-6
- 2013 - Helping A Hero - American Bar Association Publishers - ISBN 978-1-62722-195-5
- 2012 - A Breath of Hope - American Bar Association Publishers - ISBN 978-1-61438-448-9
- 2012 - The House on Dirty-Third Street - Peachtree Publishers -ISBN 978-1561456192
- 2010 - Rosa's Bus: The Ride to Civil Rights - Calkins Creek - ISBN 978-1-59078-722-9
- 2005 - Who is George Washington Carver - Children's Press - ISBN 0-516-24939-8
- 2005 - Who is Jane Goodall - Children's Press - ISBN 0-516-24940-1
- 2004 - Moving Day - Children's Press - ISBN 0-516-22846-3
- 2004 - When I Grow up - Children's Press - ISBN 0-516-23611-3
- 2003 - A Lunch with Punch - Children's Press - ISBN 0-516-22879-X
- 2002 - Going to the Beach - Children's Press - ISBN 0-516-22535-9
- 2001 - Birds of North America West - DK Publishing, Inc. - ISBN 0-7894-7901-X
- 2001 - Birds of North America East - DK Publishing, Inc. - ISBN 0-7894-7899-4
- 1998 - Stories in Stone: The World of Animal Fossils - Franklin Watts Publishing - ISBN 0-531-20384-0
- 1998 - A look at Minerals: From Galena to Gold - Franklin Watts Publishing - ISBN 0-613-18903-5
- 1997 - A Look at Rocks: From Coal to Kimberlite - Franklin Watts Publishing - ISBN 0-531-15887-X
- 1996 - Dead Log Alive! - Franklin Watts Publishing - ISBN 0-531-20237-2
- 1996 - The Joy of Cats - Meadowbrook Press, Inc. - ISBN 0-671-31726-1

== Bibliography - books published with Korean publishers ==
- 2014 - What Are You Drawing? - Tuntun/Unibooks, Co., Ltd., Seoul, Korea -
- 2014 - Time For Lunch - Tuntun/Unibooks, Co., Ltd., Seoul, Korea -
- 2014 - It is Showtime! - Tuntun/Unibooks, Co., Ltd., Seoul, Korea -
- 2013 - I Want To Be an Inventor - Tuntun/Unibooks, Co., Ltd., Seoul, Korea -
- 2012 - I Jump Up, I Come Back Down - Tuntun/Unibooks, Co., Ltd., Seoul, Korea -
- 2012 - The Boy Who Cried Wolf - Tuntun/Unibooks, Co., Ltd., Seoul, Korea -

=== Birmingham News articles by Jo Kittinger ===
"Plan the Perfect Staycation," June 7, 2009 "Just Like NO ONE Used to Make," April 22, 2009 "Christmas Around the World," December 21, 2008 "A Primer to the Week's Holidays," December 21, 2008 ""Spring Break Adventures" March 13, 2008 For Easter Fun, Think Outside the Basket" March 8, 2008 "Mom's Little Helpers," December 11, 2007

"New Twist on Old Yarns," September 15, 2007 "Fun at Camp Papa" August 2, 2007 "Annual Rodeo Rounds Up Fish and Fun" May 31, 2007 "Get in the Swim" May 24, 2007 "Festival a Throwback to Negro League Baseball" April 12, 2007 "The Drama of Equalization" January 25, 2007 "

- Worm learning Hemphill students get to heart (5) of the matter

Birmingham News (Alabama), January 11, 2007, Thursday, LIFESTYLE; Pg. 8E, 683 words, JO KITTINGER For The Birmingham News

- Annual rodeo rounds up FISH and FUN FISHING IN THE PARK Annual East Lake Family Fishing Rodeo lures young anglers / XX

Birmingham News (Alabama), May 31, 2007, Thursday, LIFESTYLE; Pg. 8E, 505 words, JO S. KITTINGER For The Birmingham News

- GET IN THE SWIM! (or other summer activity) With all that's going on, there's no time for boredom; fun is just a registration form away

Birmingham News (Alabama), May 24, 2007, Thursday, LIFESTYLE; Pg. 8E, 1504 words, JO S. KITTINGER For The Birmingham News

- BLACK DIAMONDS Baseball fans in for treat as former Negro League players tell their stories

Birmingham News (Alabama), April 12, 2007, Thursday, LIFESTYLE; Pg. 8E, 707 words, JO S. KITTINGER For The Birmingham News

- The drama of equalization Director's life experience leads to an honored play

Birmingham News (Alabama), January 25, 2007, Thursday, LIFESTYLE; Pg. 8E, 447 words, JO S. KITTINGER For The Birmingham News

- 'That Fat Cat' inspires scholarship program

Birmingham News (Alabama), December 28, 2006, Thursday, LIFESTYLE; Pg. 10E, 466 words, JO S. KITTINGER For The Birmingham News

- The price of ice Local figure-skating pair take the spills in stride

Birmingham News (Alabama), November 9, 2006, Thursday, LIFESTYLE; Pg. 8E, 625 words, JO S. KITTINGER For The Birmingham News

- AMAZING MAZE Teen triplets help parents make Columbiana maze Teen triplets help parents create twisting, turning fall fun in Columbiana

Birmingham News (Alabama), October 5, 2006, Thursday, LIFESTYLE; Pg. 8E, 513 words, JO S. KITTINGER For The Birmingham News

- Migrating monarchs headed our way Colorful butterflies pretty but poisonous

Birmingham News (Alabama), September 7, 2006, Thursday, LIFESTYLE; Pg. 8E, 495 words, JO S. KITTINGER For The Birmingham News

- Get ready to wiggle! Lovable preschool kids' band to stop here July 28

Birmingham News (Alabama), July 20, 2006, Thursday, LIFESTYLE; Pg. 8E, 446 words, JO S. KITTINGER For The Birmingham News

- Cash in on Fun

Birmingham News (Alabama), June 29, 2006, Thursday, LIFESTYLE; Pg. 8E, 312 words, JO S. KITTINGER For The Birmingham News

- Dora sets sail for adventure Dora the Explorer sets sail for adventure at BJCC next week

Birmingham News (Alabama), February 9, 2006, Thursday, LIFESTYLE; Pg. 10E, 212 words, JO S. KITTINGER For The Birmingham News

- Disney on Ice comes to life Popular princesses and their loves discover whole new world in Magic City

Birmingham News (Alabama), November 3, 2005, Thursday, LIFESTYLE; Pg. 8E, 437 words, JO S. KITTINGER For The Birmingham News

- Soaring to new heights Flight museum's classes take off, teach how airplanes work

Birmingham News (Alabama), October 13, 2005, Thursday, LIFESTYLE; Pg. 8E, 496 words, JO S. KITTINGER for The Birmingham News

=== Newspaper references of Jo Kittinger ===
- December 7, 2005: Wednesday, "City resident finds way to talk to kids - in books", COMMUNITY NEWS; Pg. 4H, 678 words, JEREMY GRAY News staff writer
- LECTURES/ LITERARY

Birmingham News (Alabama), April 27, 2007, Friday, LIFESTYLE; Pg. 33G, 450 words

- CALENDAR - LOOKING AHEAD EVENTS

Birmingham News (Alabama), April 20, 2007, Friday, LIFESTYLE; Pg. 34G, 2918 words
