= Pi Mu Epsilon =

American mathematics honor society

- ΠΜΕ
- Founded: May 24, 1914; 111 years ago Syracuse University
- Type: Honor
- Affiliation: Independent
- Status: Active
- Emphasis: Mathematics
- Scope: National
- Motto: Τὴν παίδευσιν καὶ τὰ μαθηματικὰ ἐπισπεύδειν "To promote scholarship and mathematics"
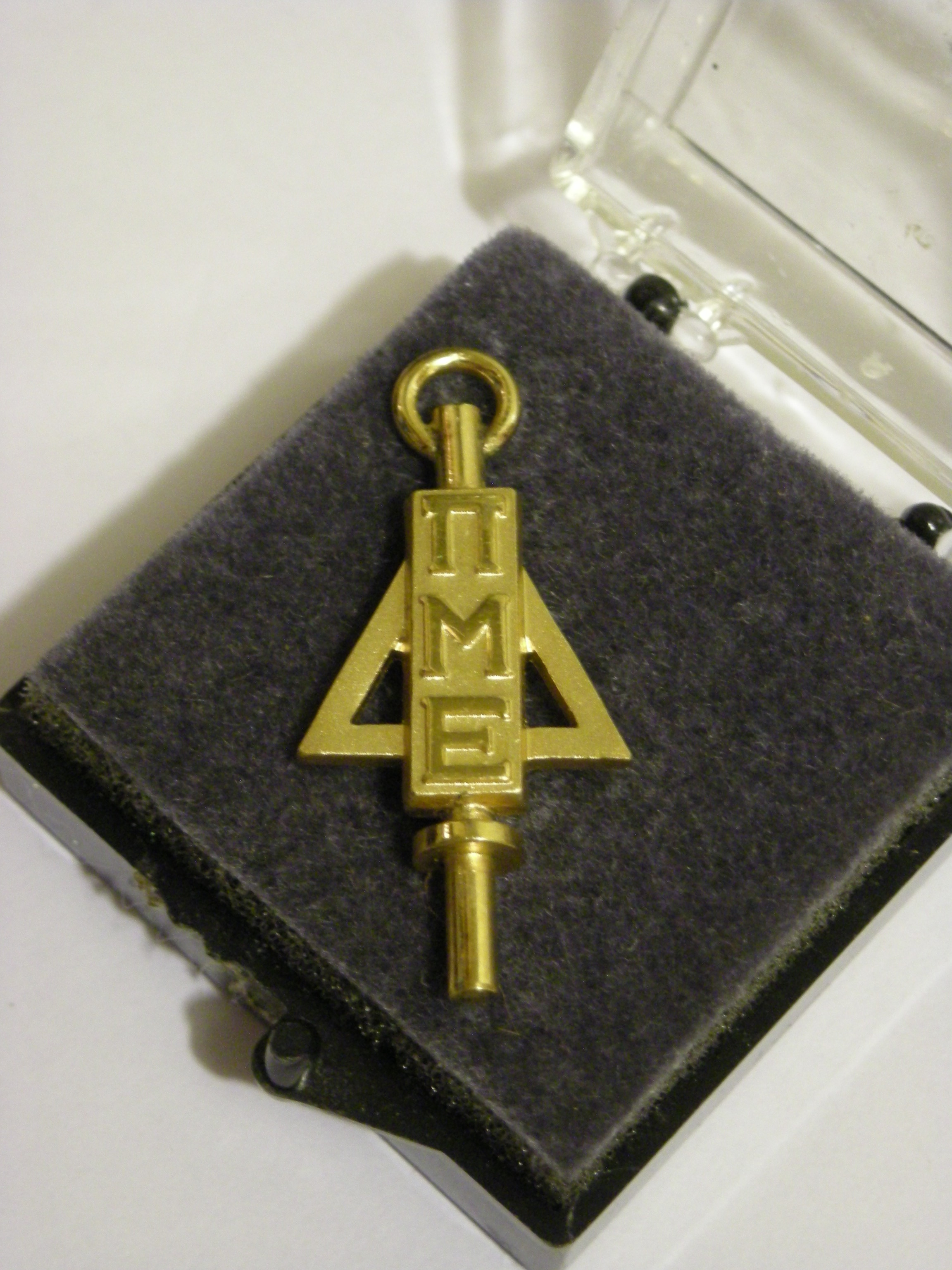
- Member badge
- Colors: Violet, Gold, and Lavender
- Flower: Violet
- Chapters: 371
- Headquarters: c/o Michelle Ghrist; Department of Mathematics; Gonzaga University; 502 East Boone Avenue; Spokane, Washington 99258; United States
- Website: www.pme-math.org

Pi Mu Epsilon (ΠΜΕ or PME) is the U.S. honorary national mathematics society. The society currently has chapters at over 400 institutions across the U.S.

== History ==
Pi Mu Epsilon was founded at Syracuse University on May 25, 1914, by Professor Edward Drake Roe, Jr. Pi Mu Epsilon is dedicated to the promotion of mathematics and recognition of students who successfully pursue mathematical understanding. To promote mathematics, the National Pi Mu Epsilon Council co-sponsors an annual conference in conjunction with the Mathematical Association of America.

Eileen Poiani was the first woman to be elected as president of Pi Mu Epsilon, serving as president for 1987–1990.

== Symbols ==
Pi Mu Epsilon's motto is Τὴν παίδευσιν καὶ τὰ μαθηματικὰ ἐπισπεύδειν or "To promote scholarship and mathematics". Its colors are violet, gold and lavender. Its flower is the Violet.

== Activities ==
The society also publishes a semi-annual journal, the Pi Mu Epsilon Journal, which both presents research papers particularly focusing on student authored papers, as well as a problem section.

The Richard V. Andree Awards are given by the organization to undergraduates whose articles in the Journal have been judged as containing the best content for the year. Andree served as the editor of the journal, as well as President and Secretary-Treasurer of the organization.

== Membership ==
A person meeting any one of the following four sets of qualifications may be elected to membership by a chapter. This election shall be irrespective of sex, religion, race, or national origin:

- Undergraduate students who have completed at least the equivalent of two semesters of calculus and two additional courses in mathematics, at or above the calculus level, all of which lead to the fulfillment of the requirements for a major in the mathematical sciences. In addition, such students must have maintained a grade point average equivalent to that of at least 3.0 on a 4-point scale, both for all courses that lead to fulfillment of requirements for a major in the mathematical sciences, and also for all courses that lead to fulfillment of requirements for an undergraduate degree.
- Graduate students whose mathematical work is at least equivalent to that required of qualified undergraduates, and who have maintained at least a B average in mathematics during their last school year prior to their election.
- Members of the faculty in mathematics or related subjects.
- Any person who has some special distinction in mathematics (e.g. major math publication of importance, Putnam competition winners).

== See also ==
- Kappa Mu Epsilon, ΚΜΕ (mathematics)
- Mu Alpha Theta, ΜΑΘ (mathematics, high school)
- Mu Sigma Rho, ΜΣΡ (statistics)
- Professional fraternities and sororities
