= Florida Credit Union =

Financial services institution headquartered in Gainesville, Florida

- Formerly: Alachua County Teachers Credit Union
- Company type: Credit union
- Industry: Financial services
- Founded: 1954
- Headquarters: Gainesville, Florida
- Number of locations: 13 branches
- Area served: North Central Florida
- Key people: Mark Starr (President and CEO)
- Website: www.flcu.org

Florida Credit Union is a member-owned financial services institution headquartered in Gainesville, Florida, and serving the North Central Florida area. As of September 2018, Florida Credit Union had over $1.09 billion in assets and has more than 101,000 members. FCU is regulated under the authority of the National Credit Union Administration (NCUA). CEO and President Mark Starr has been working for the company since 1996.

== History ==
Established in 1954 as a state-chartered credit union, FCU was originally called the Alachua County Teachers Credit Union and was owned and run by teachers in the Alachua County School System. The credit union is now open for membership to anyone who lives or works in one of 36 North Central Florida counties: Alachua, Baker, Bradford, Brevard, Citrus, Clay, Columbia, Dixie, Duval, Flagler, Gilchrist, Hamilton, Hernando, Hillsborough, Indian River, Jefferson, Lake, Leon, Levy, Madison, Marion, Nassau, Osceola, Orange, Pasco, Pinellas, Polk, Putnam, Seminole, St. Johns, Sumter, Suwannee, Taylor, Union, and Volusia.

Despite its expansion, the credit union still maintains a close relationship with the school systems. This includes a partnership with the Alachua County Public Schools Foundation and the Alachua County Tools for Schools Program. FCU also participates in Marion, Levy, Union, Gilchrist, Bradford, Volusia and Columbia County School Systems' "Back to School" and Teacher Appreciation events throughout the year.
