= Mu Sigma Rho =

American statistics honor society

- ΜΣΡ
- Founded: 1968; 58 years ago Iowa State University
- Type: Honor
- Affiliation: Independent
- Status: Active
- Emphasis: Statistics
- Scope: National
- Member badge
- Publication: The Mu Sigma Rhover
- Chapters: 36
- Headquarters: c/o Lynne Seymour, PhD; Secretary, Mu Sigma Rho; Department of Statistics; University of Georgia; Athens, Georgia 30602; United States
- Website: www.stat.purdue.edu/msr/

Mu Sigma Rho (ΜΣΡ) is an American national honor society for statistics. It was established at Iowa State University in 1968.

== History ==
Mu Sigma Rho was founded by Ted Bancroft, David Huntsberger, and Oscar Kempthorne at the Statistical Laboratory and Department of Statistics at Iowa State University in 1968. It was formed as the National Statistics Honor Society. Mu Sigma Rho seeks to promote and encourage scholarly activity in statistics, and to recognize outstanding achievement of students, faculty, and professional statisticians in academic and non-academic institutions.

The society was incorporated in the state of Iowa. Its first chapter, Alpha, was established at towa State University. Donald K. Hotchkiss was the first president of the national society, while Eric West was the first president of the Alpha chapter.

In February 2005, the society began allowing American Statistical Association chapters to join Mu Sigma Rho as affiliate chapters. The allows students to join the society who attend universities and colleges that do not have a Mu Sigma Rho chapters.

== Activities ==
Mu Sigma Rho provides outreach and professional service. Some chapters host speakers and provide tutoring services to other students. The society publishes an occasional newsletter, The Mu Sigma Rhover.

Mu Sigma Rho presents annual awards, including the William D. Warde Statistics Education Award and the Mu Sigma Rho Early Career Undergraduate Impact Award. The Early Career Undergraduate Impact Award is presented to a statistics faculty member for contributions to the success of undergraduate students. The Warde Statistics Education Award known as the Statistics Education Award before 2000, is presented to a statistics instructor for excellence in the classroom and a lifetime of commitment to statistics education. Faculty at any academic institution in the United States are eligible; recipients do not have to work for Mu Sigma Rho member institutions. The names and photos of the winners are on the Mu Sigma Rho website.

== Membership ==
Mu Sigma Rho's membership consists of undergraduate students, graduate students, faculty, and honorary members.

To be eligible for membership, undergraduates must have completed two years of college and eight semester hours of statistics courses, including five hours at a junior level, with a 3.40 GPA in those courses and a 3.20 GPA overall. Graduate students seeking membership must have completed twelve semester hours with a 3.50 GPA.

== Chapters ==
Following is a list of Mu Sigma Rho chapters. Active chapters are in bold. Inactive chapters are in italics.

Chapter	Former chapter name	Charter date and range	Institution	Location	Status	Ref.
**Iowa State**	Iowa Alpha	1968	Iowa State University	Ames, Iowa	Active	
**Medical University of South Carolina**	South Carolina Alpha	August 30, 1979	Medical University of South Carolina	Charleston, South Carolina	Active	
**Virginia Tech**	Virginia Alpha	1979	Virginia Tech	Blacksburg, Virginia	Active	
**Oklahoma State University**	Oklahoma Alpha	Before 1982	Oklahoma State University–Stillwater	Stillwater, Oklahoma	Active	
	West Virginia Alpha	Before 1982	West Virginia University	Morgantown, West Virginia	Inactive	
	Colorado Alpha	Before 1986	Colorado State University	Fort Collins, Colorado	Inactive	
North Carolina State University	North Carolina Alpha	1986	North Carolina State University	Raleigh, North Carolina	Active	
	Utah Alpha	Before 1988	Utah State University	Logan, Utah	Inactive	
**Brigham Young University**	Utah Beta	1988	Brigham Young University	Provo, Utah	Active	
**University of South Carolina**	South Carolina Beta	1988	University of South Carolina	Columbia, South Carolina	Active	
	Alabama Alpha	Before 1989	University of Alabama	Tuscaloosa, Alabama	Inactive	
	Louisiana Alpha	Before 1989	McNeese State University	Lake Charles, Louisiana	Inactive	
	New York Alpha	Before 1989	Cornell University	Ithaca, New York	Inactive	
	Pennsylvania Alpha	Before 1989	Temple University	Philadelphia, Pennsylvania	Inactive	
	Ohio Alpha	Before 1992	Bowling Green State University	Bowling Green, Ohio	Inactive	
**University of Vermont**	Vermont Alpha	April 18, 1994	University of Vermont	Burlington, Vermont	Active	
**University of Florida**	Florida Alpha	1995	University of Florida	Gainesville, Florida	Active	
**Virginia Commonwealth University**	Virginia Beta		Virginia Commonwealth University	Richmond, Virginia	Active	
	Wyoming Alpha		University of Wyoming	Laramie, Wyoming	Inactive	
**Bryant University**			Bryant University	Smithfield, Rhode Island	Active	
**Butler University**			Butler University	Indianapolis, Indiana	Active	
**Cal Poly**			California Polytechnic State University, San Luis Obispo	San Luis Obispo, California	Active	
**Cal - Riverside**			University of California, Riverside	Riverside, California	Active	
**Eastern Kentucky University**			Eastern Kentucky University	Richmond, Kentucky	Active	
**Florida State University**			Florida State University	Tallahassee, Florida	Active	
**George Mason University**			George Mason University	Fairfax, Virginia	Active	
**Grand Valley State University**			Grand Valley State University	Allendale, Michigan	Active	
Kennesaw State University			Kennesaw State University	Kennesaw, Georgia	Inactive ?	
**New York University**			Steinhardt School of Culture, Education, and Human Development	New York, New York	Active	
**Penn State University**			Pennsylvania State University	University Park, Pennsylvania	Active	
**Purdue University**			Purdue University	West Lafayette, Indiana	Active	
**Texas A&M**			Texas A&M University	College Station, Texas	Active	
**University of Georgia**			University of Georgia	Athens, Georgia	Active	
**University of Louisville Biostatistics**			University of Louisville	Louisville, Kentucky	Active	
**University of Maryland, Baltimore County**			University of Maryland, Baltimore County	Catonsville, Maryland	Active	
**University of Nebraska**			University of Nebraska–Lincoln	Lincoln, Nebraska	Active	
**Boston Chapter of ASA**		2005	Colby College and Saint Michael's College	Boston, Massachusetts	Active	
**Cleveland Chapter of ASA**		After 2005	Cleveland State University	Cleveland, Ohio	Active	
**Dayton Chapter of ASA**		After 2005		Dayton, Ohio	Active	
**Kentucky Chapter of ASA**		After 2005	University of Kentucky	Lexington, Kentucky	Active	
**Pittsburgh Chapter of ASA**		After 2005		Pittsburgh, Pennsylvania	Active	(Note: Chapter covers the greater Pittsburgh area, including Carnegie Mellon University, Indiana University of Pennsylvania, Slippery Rock University, and the University of Pittsburgh.)
**Southern California Chapter of ASA**		After 2005	University of California, Los Angeles	Los Angeles, California	Active	
**Albuquerque Chapter of ASA**		2006	University of New Mexico	Albuquerque, New Mexico	Active	
**Winona State University**		2007	Winona State University	Winona, Minnesota	Active	
**Washington, D.C. Chapter of ASA**		2008		Washington, D.C.	Active	
**Kansas Western Missouri Chapter of ASA**		2012	University of Central Missouri	Warrensburg, Missouri	Active	
**Elon University**		January 2016	Elon University	Elon, North Carolina	Active	
**University of Arizona**		April 2021	University of Arizona	Tucson, Arizona	Active	
**St Lawrence University**		2023	St. Lawrence University	Canton, New York	Active	

== Notable members ==
- Marcia Gumpertz, professor of statistics at North Carolina State University

== See also ==
- List of academic statistical associations
- Professional fraternities and sororities
