= Vestavia Hills, Alabama =

City in Alabama, United States

- City
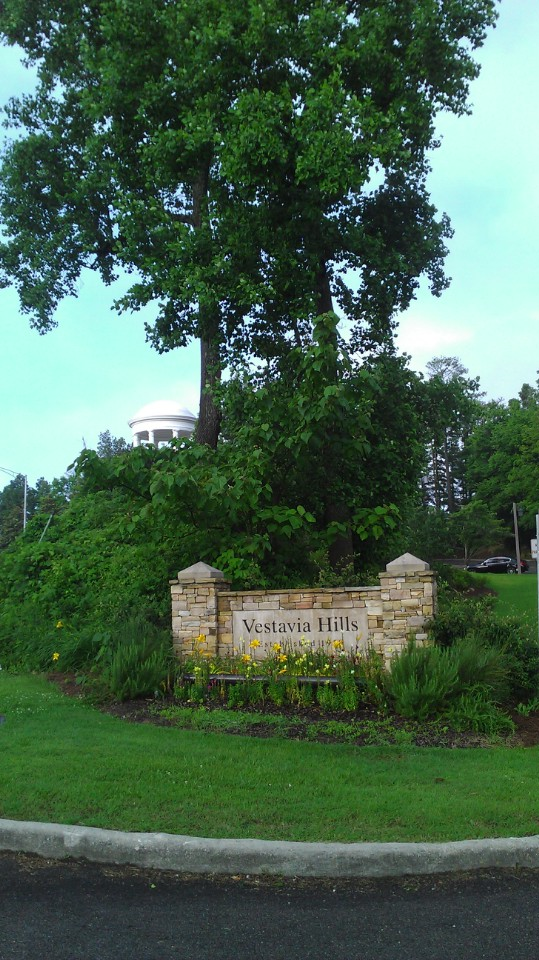
- Entrance to Vestavia Hills from Highway 31

- Flag Logo
- Interactive map of Vestavia Hills, Alabama
- Location within Alabama
- Coordinates: 33.4625°N 86.7395°W
- Country: United States
- State: Alabama
- Counties: Jefferson, Shelby
- Established: 1950
- Incorporated: November 8, 1950
- Named for: Vestavia

Government
  - Type: Council–Manager
  - Mayor: Ashley Curry
  - Mayor Pro Tempore: Rusty Weaver
  - City Manager: Jeff Downes; Cinnamon McCulley
  - City Council: Kimberly Cook; Michael Vercher; Ali Pilcher

Area
  - City: 20.352 sq mi (52.711 km^{2})
  - Land: 20.111 sq mi (52.087 km^{2})
  - Water: 0.241 sq mi (0.625 km^{2}) 1.18%
- Elevation: 705 ft (215 m)

Population (2020)
  - City: 39,102
  - Estimate (2025): 38,306
  - Rank: US: 1092nd AL: 14th
  - Density: 1,944.3/sq mi (750.71/km^{2})
  - Urban: 774,956 (US: 58th)
  - Metro: 1,197,766 (US: 48th)
- Time zone: UTC–6 (Central (CST))
  - Summer (DST): UTC–5 (CDT)
- ZIP Codes: 35216, 35226, 35242, 35266
- Area codes: 205 and 659
- FIPS code: 01-78552
- GNIS feature ID: 2405646
- Website: vhal.org

Vestavia Hills, colloquially known simply as Vestavia, is a city in Jefferson and Shelby Counties, Alabama, United States. The population was 39,102 as of the 2020 census, and was estimated at 38,306 in 2025, making it is the third-largest city in Jefferson County, after Birmingham and Hoover, and making it is the fourteenth-largest city in Alabama. It is a suburb of Birmingham and it is made up of Vestavia, Liberty Park, and Cahaba Heights.

== History ==
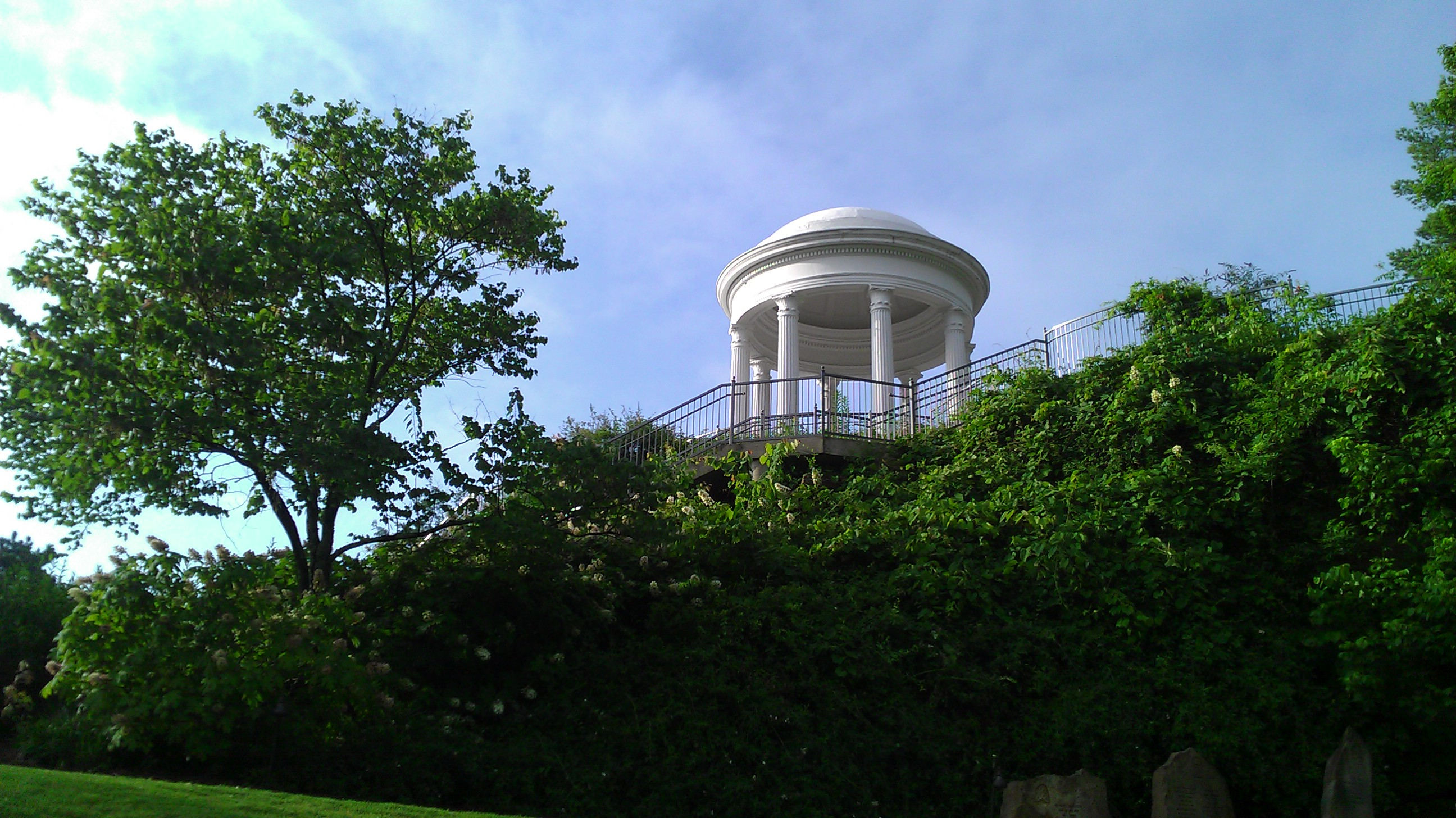
Sibyl Temple

Vestavia Hills is named for the 20-acre (8.1 ha) estate of former Birmingham mayor George B. Ward. It was situated on the crest of Shades Mountain in what is now the northern edge of the city. Ward's mansion at the Vestavia estate became a landmark in the area as soon as it was completed in 1925. The 2 1/2-story house was patterned after the circular Temple of Vesta in Rome, with dark pink sandstone walls encircled by 20 massive white Doric columns surmounted by a carved entablature. The extensive gardens, populated by statuary and peacocks, surrounded a smaller domed gazebo patterned after the Temple of Sibyl in Tivoli.

After Ward's death, the house, something of a tourist stop near the highway between Birmingham and Montgomery, was used as a tearoom and reception hall before being purchased by Vestavia Hills Baptist Church. The church met in the temple like structure for several years before demolishing a portion of the building in 1971 to make way for a larger building; a central portion of the original building remains. The local garden club moved the gazebo to a prominent outcropping closer to the highway, there to serve as a landmark gateway into the community.

The development of Vestavia Hills as a residential suburb began in 1946, when developer Charles Byrd planned a subdivision for approximately 1,000 people on the southern flank of Shades Mountain. The suburb was incorporated as a separate city on November 8, 1950, and has since grown, by rapid development and annexation, into a thriving small city of over 39,000 by 2020.

== Geography ==
The city is located along U.S. Route 31, which runs north to south through the city, leading north 7 mi (11 km) to downtown Birmingham and southwest 4 mi (6 km) to Hoover.

According to the United States Census Bureau, the city has an area of 20.352 square miles (52.71 km^{2}), of which 20.111 square miles (52.09 km^{2}) is land and 0.241 square miles (0.62 km^{2}) (1.18%) is water.

== Demographics ==
Historical population
Census	Pop.	Note	%±
1960	4,029		—
1970	12,250		204.0%
1980	15,722		28.3%
1990	19,749		25.6%
2000	24,476		23.9%
2010	34,033		39.0%
2020	39,102		14.9%
2025 (est.)	38,306		−2.0%
U.S. Decennial Census; 2020 Census

According to realtor website Zillow, the average price of a home as of July 31, 2026, in Vestavia Hills was $573,031.

As of the 2024 American Community Survey, there were 13,840 estimated households in Vestavia Hills with an average of 2.56 persons per household. The city has a median household income of $134,369. Approximately 10.0% of the city's population lives at or below the poverty line. Vestavia Hills has an estimated 59.0% employment rate, with 65.3% of the population holding a bachelor's degree or higher and 93.9% holding a high school diploma. There were 15,014 housing units at an average density of 746.56 per square mile (288.25/km^{2}).

The top five reported languages (people were allowed to report up to two languages, thus the figures will generally add to more than 100%) were English (92.1%), Spanish (2.1%), Indo-European (2.3%), Asian and Pacific Islander (2.5%), and Other (1.0%).

The median age in the city was 41.7 years.

=== Racial and ethnic composition ===
Vestavia Hills city, Alabama – Racial and ethnic composition Note: the US Census treats Hispanic/Latino as an ethnic category. This table excludes Latinos from the racial categories and assigns them to a separate category. Hispanics/Latinos may be of any race.
Race / Ethnicity (NH = Non-Hispanic)	Pop 1980	Pop 1990	Pop 2000	Pop 2010	Pop 2020	% 1980	% 1990	% 2000	% 2010	% 2020
White alone (NH)	15,405	19,060	22,892	30,245	32,578	97.98%	96.51%	93.53%	88.87%	83.32%
Black or African American alone (NH)	14	223	453	1,274	1,816	0.09%	1.13%	1.85%	3.74%	4.64%
Native American or Alaska Native alone (NH)	20	14	26	60	42	0.13%	0.07%	0.11%	0.18%	0.11%
Asian alone (NH)	168	294	604	1,300	2,197	1.07%	1.49%	2.47%	3.82%	5.62%
Native Hawaiian or Pacific Islander alone (NH)	x	x	12	6	3	x	x	0.05%	0.02%	0.01%
Other race alone (NH)	16	0	14	25	127	0.10%	0.00%	0.06%	0.07%	0.32%
Mixed race or Multiracial (NH)	x	x	141	288	1,079	x	x	0.58%	0.85%	2.76%
Hispanic or Latino (any race)	99	149	334	835	1,260	0.63%	0.75%	1.36%	2.45%	3.22%
Total	15,722	19,749	24,476	34,033	39,102	100.00%	100.00%	100.00%	100.00%	100.00%

=== 2020 census ===
As of the 2020 census, there were 39,102 people, 15,187 households, and 10,545 families residing in the city. The population density was 1,959.21 inhabitants per square mile (756.46/km^{2}). There were 15,883 housing units at an average density of 795.82 per square mile (307.27/km^{2}). The racial makeup of the city was 83.89% White, 4.71% African American, 0.15% Native American, 5.63% Asian, 0.01% Pacific Islander, 1.14% from some other races and 4.48% from two or more races. Hispanic or Latino people of any race were 3.22% of the population.

=== 2010 census ===
As of the 2010 census, there were 34,033 people, 13,987 households, and 9,268 families residing in the city. The population density was 1,753.46 inhabitants per square mile (677.01/km^{2}). There were 14,952 housing units at an average density of 770.36 per square mile (297.44/km^{2}). The racial makeup of the city was 90.38% White, 3.76% African American, 0.20% Native American, 3.83% Asian, 0.02% Pacific Islander, 0.81% from some other races and 1.01% from two or more races. Hispanic or Latino people of any race were 2.45% of the population.

There were 14,952 housing units and 13,987 households, with a home ownership rate of 76.8%. The average household size was 2.47 and the average family size was 3.03. The median value of owner-occupied housing units was $318,200. The median household income was $87,154 with 4.0% of the population below the poverty line. The per capita income for the city was $50,017.

In the city the population was spread out with 25.3% under the age of 18, and 15.3% who were 65 years of age or older. The median age was 41 years. 52.4% of the population was female.

=== 2000 census ===
As of the 2000 census, there were 24,476 people, 9,841 households, and 6,878 families residing in the city. The population density was 1,672.66 inhabitants per square mile (645.82/km^{2}). There were 10,523 housing units at an average density of 719.13 per square mile (277.66/km^{2}). The racial makeup of the city was 94.46% White, 1.85% African American, 0.11% Native American, 2.47% Asian, 0.10% Pacific Islander, 0.35% from some other races and 0.67% from two or more races. Hispanic or Latino people of any race were 1.36% of the population.

There were 9,841 households out of which 34.2% had children under the age of 18 living with them, 61.1% were married couples living together, 7.2% had a female householder with no husband present, and 30.1% were non-families. 26.6% of all households were made up of individuals and 13.1% had someone living alone who was 65 years of age or older. The average household size was 2.48 and the average family size was 3.03.

In the city the population was spread out with 25.8% under the age of 18, 6.0% from 18 to 24, 25.9% from 25 to 44, 26.1% from 45 to 64, and 16.2% who were 65 years of age or older. The median age was 41 years. For every 100 females there were 88.6 males. For every 100 females age 18 and over, there were 83.3 males.

The median income for a household in the city was $70,623, and the median income for a family was $89,746. Males had a median income of $72,837 versus $37,083 for females. The per capita income for the city was $40,392. 3.1% of the population and 2.2% of families were below the poverty line. Out of the total people living in poverty, 1.6% were under the age of 18 and 4.5% were 65 or older.

== Education ==
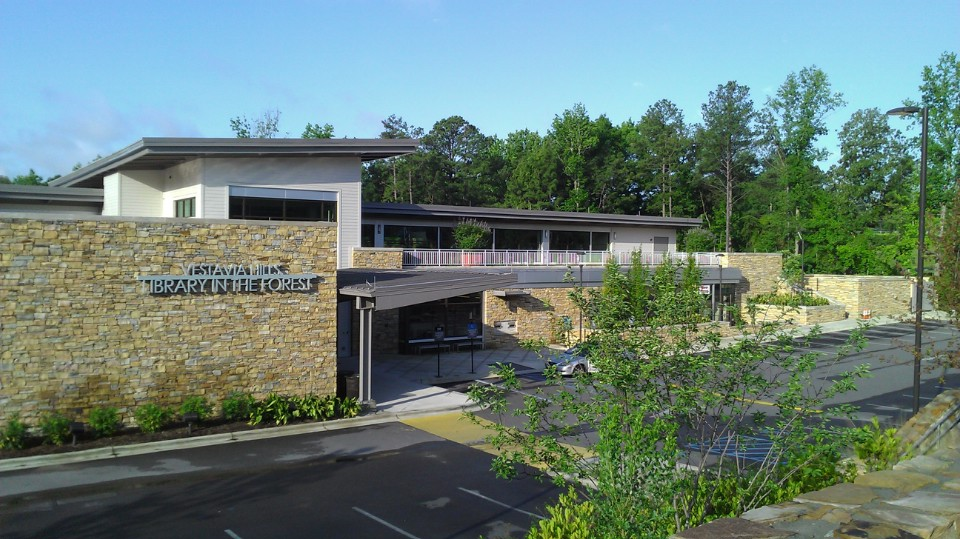
Library in the Forest

The high quality of the school system in Vestavia Hills has been recognized by the Wall Street Journal and other sources. It comprises five elementary schools, two middle schools, one alternative school and one high school, with a total enrollment of some 6,000 students. Vestavia Hills High School is known for the success of its math and debate teams, which have each won several national competitions. The schools' band and baseball programs have also received much recognition. The 2008/2009 boys' basketball team won the Alabama state championship in division 6A. Vestavia Hills’ wrestling team won the 7A AHSAA State Championship in 2016 and 2017, and holds the record for state championship titles in Alabama state history with 15 Wrestling State Championships. Vestavia opened its 8th school in August 2008, Liberty Park Middle School.

In Fall 2006, the Vestavia Hills Board of Education moved to petition the federal government to end the required desegregation busing of predominantly black students from the Shannon/Oxmoor Valley area due to overcrowding. The Unitary Status court settlement was federally approved in July 2007. Any students currently enrolled at any Vestavia Hills' school will be allowed to continue in the system until graduation.

== Parks and recreation ==
Vestavia Hills offers its citizens many open spaces for families to enjoy the day, participate in sporting events, and take part in community events. Many of the public spaces are regulated by the Vestavia Hills Parks and Recreation Department.

The city offers many club sports. The city of Vestavia supports youth baseball, softball, girls and boys basketball, wrestling, soccer, lacrosse, football, flag-football, cheerleading, tennis, pickleball, swimming, eSports, volleyball, Miracle League baseball, and a selection of adult and senior sports.

Wald Park is one of the biggest parks in the main part of Vestavia. The park sits on top of a hill right next to Vestavia Hills Elementary West and overlooks Vestavia Hills Elementary Central. The park includes many community areas such as the Vestavia Hills Swimming Pool, the Civic Center, and the Senior's Lodge. Wald Park has five baseball fields, a walking track, picnic areas, community playgrounds, a dog park, tennis courts, and pickleball courts. The park is open every day from 5:00 a.m. until 9:30 p.m. Pets are allowed, but must be kept on a leash.

Byrd Park is a smaller local park, located next to Vestavia Hills Elementary East. It is a small area encircled by a walking path and offers a picnic area and a playground for the children.

McCallum Park is an open area park offering only pavilions, restrooms, and a walking track. There is a large open field often used for picnics and family or community events. The park opens at 6:00 a.m. every day and closes at sunset. Pets are welcome, but must remain on a leash.

Liberty Park Sports Complex is located in the heart of Liberty Park behind the elementary and middle schools. It is home to nine softball fields, four youth fields and five adult fields. The complex also offers one football field and four natural grass soccer fields. The fields are the home to the local youth soccer club, Vestavia Hills Soccer Club. The fields open at daybreak and close at 9:30, except when events are going on. Pets are welcome.

Sicard Hollow Athletic Complex, or colloquially known as the SHAC, is an extension of the Liberty Park Sports Complex and is located on the road that runs behind it. Sicard Hollow is a growing complex that currently consists of a turf football and lacrosse field that double as soccer fields and an additional two turf soccer fields. Restrooms, concessions, score towers, and bleachers are available. There are plans to expand the complex to include an amphitheater, water area, dog park, and walking trails.

Cahaba Heights Athletic Fields are located directly behind Vestavia Hills Elementary, Cahaba Heights and is home to three youth baseball fields and one multipurpose field.

== Transportation ==
Transit service in Vestavia Hills is provided by Birmingham-Jefferson County Transit Authority, which operates Max Transit bus service.

== Notable people ==
- Spencer Bachus – former U.S. Representative from Alabama's 6th congressional district
- Abby Champion – model
- Pat DuPré – former top 20 professional tennis player; collegiate star at Stanford
- Eli Gold – sportscaster
- Chris Hammond – baseball pitcher (Reds, Marlins, Braves, Yankees, A's, Padres)
- Josh Hancock – baseball pitcher; World Series Champion 2006 for St. Louis Cardinals
- Smylie Kaufman – PGA Tour member
- Hudson Meek – actor
- Rebecca Moore, Miss Alabama USA
- Michael Papajohn – actor, producer and stuntman
- Richard Scrushy – founder and former CEO of physical rehabilitation healthcare HealthSouth
- Don Siegelman – former governor of Alabama (D)
- Abbie Stockard – Miss America 2025
- Ethan Strand – runner; NCAA Record holder in the mile and 3000m; competed at the 2025 World Athletics Championships
- Jabo Waggoner – state senator
- George B. Ward – former mayor of Birmingham

== See also ==
- Vestavia Hills High School
- "Vestavia Hills" by Jason Isbell, on the album Weathervanes
