= Clan Fraser =

Lowland Scottish clan

- Na Frisealaich
- Crest: On a mount a flourish of strawberries leaved and fructed Proper
- Motto: All my hope is in God.

Profile
- Region: Lowlands
- Plant badge: Yew

Chief
- Katherine Fraser
- The Rt. Hon. The Lady Saltoun
- Seat: Philorth Castle (Cairnbulg Castle)
- Historic seat: Oliver Castle; Pitsligo Castle; Castle Fraser
Clan branches
Lord Saltoun (chiefs)
Frasers of Philorth
Frasers of Muchalls
See also:
Clan Fraser of Lovat
Frasers of Strichen
Frasers of Inverallochy

Clan Fraser is a Scottish clan of the Scottish Lowlands. It is not to be confused with the Clan Fraser of Lovat who are a separate Scottish clan of the Scottish Highlands (though with a common ancestry). Both clans have their own separate chief, both of whom are officially recognized by the Standing Council of Scottish Chiefs.

== History ==
=== Origins of the clan ===
The exact origins of the surname "Fraser" cannot be determined with any great certainty. The Frasers are believed to have come from the County of Anjou in France somewhere in the 11th century, and some possible places of origin have been suggested throughout the years, with La Frezelière (at La Roche-Neuville) and Fréteval being the most common.

Traditionally, the surname is thought to be of French origin, but the Oxford Dictionary of Family Names (2016) notes there is no place name in France corresponding with the earliest spellings of the name "de Fresel", "de Friselle", and "de Freseliere", and suggests the possibility it represents a Gaelic name "corrupted beyond recognition by Anglo-French scribes".

The name Fraser may be an altered form of the French patronymic Fresel. The French surname Fresel meant "ribbon, braid" in Old French and was probably the nickname for such merchants. In fact, the surnames Fresel and Frezel are now centred on Normandy and Artois/French Flanders and not in Anjou because Fresel/Frezel were historically Plantagenet. It sounds like a derived form of fraise which means "strawberry" in French and such popular etymologies explain many badges and coats of arms.

The first Frasers to appear in Scottish records were the following:

- Simon Fraser (fl. 1160-1202), who held lands at Keith in East Lothian and left an only daughter and heiress named Eda, who married Hugh Lorens before 1210.
- Gilbert Fraser (fl. 1164-1182), probably a brother of the precedent. He was at William The Lion's court and witnessed various charters at Roxburgh, Coldingham and Melrose between 1164 and 1182. He married a woman named Christiana and had at least two sons named John and Bernard.
- Bernard Fraser (fl. 1186-1188), probably a brother of the precedent. He appeared in a charter at Haddington in 1179 and held lands at Drem in 1186.
- Udard Fraser (fl. 1179), probably a son of Gilbert. He married a sister of Oliver fitz Kylvert, the founder of Oliver Castle in upper Tweedsdale. They had three sons; Bernard, Gilbert and Adam.

=== Wars of Scottish Independence ===
About five generations after the first Simon Fraser, another Simon Fraser was captured fighting for Robert the Bruce and was executed in 1306 by Edward I of England. Simon's cousin was Alexander Fraser of Cowie who was Bruce's chamberlain. He married Bruce's sister Mary. Alexander Fraser's younger brother was another Sir Simon Fraser, from whom the chiefs of the Clan Fraser of Lovat are descended. One of Simon Fraser's grandsons was Sir Alexander Fraser of Cowie and Durris. This Alexander Fraser acquired a castle now called Cairnbulg Castle and the lands of Philorth by marriage to Joanna, younger daughter and co-heiress of the Earl of Ross in 1375.

=== Frasers of Philorth ===
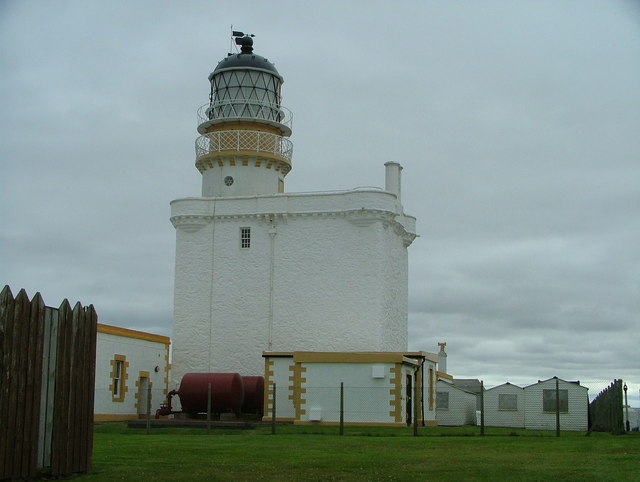
Kinnaird Head Lighthouse, formerly Kinnaird Castle, formerly Fraserburgh Castle.

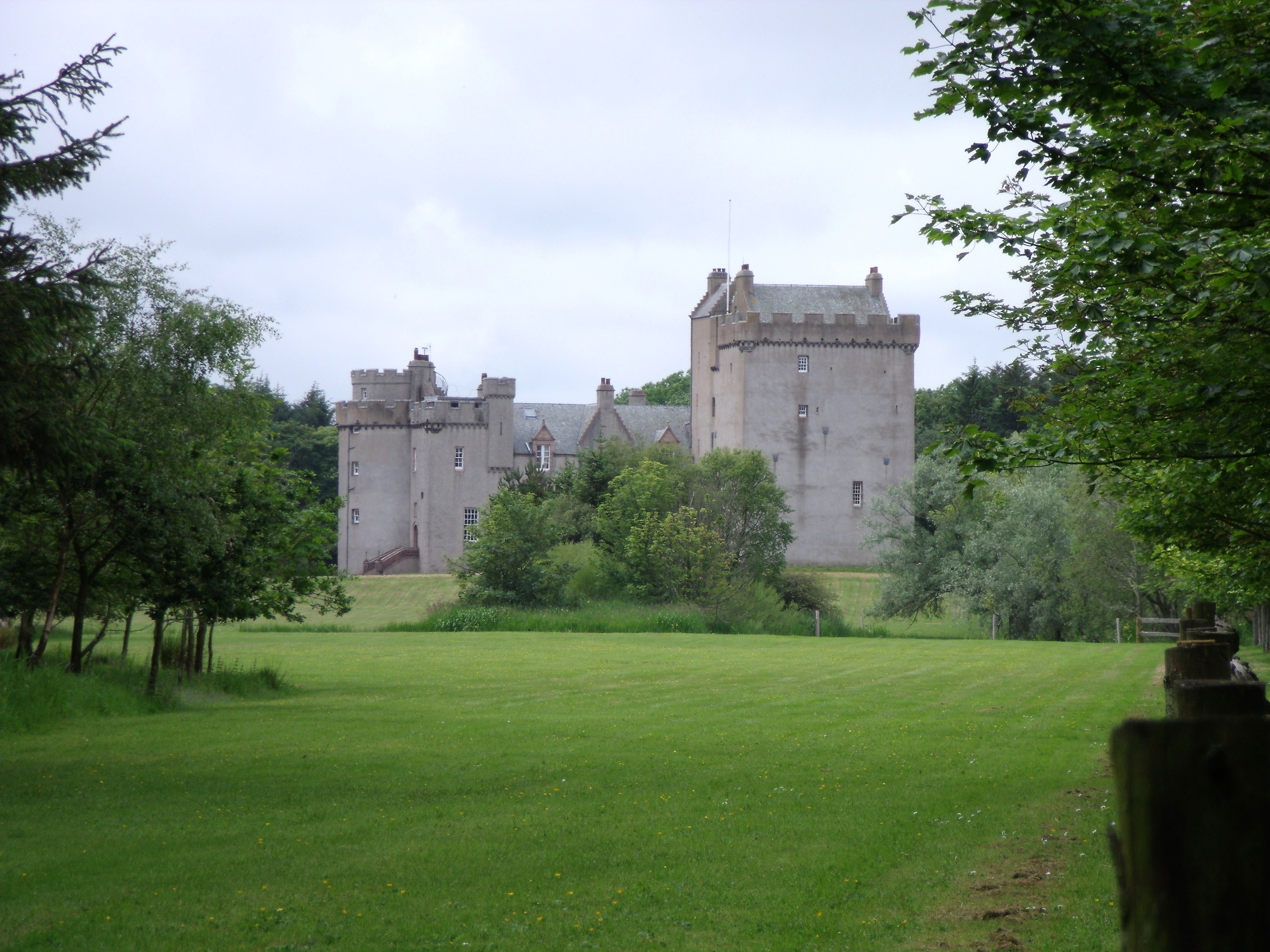
Cairnbulg Castle, formerly Philorth Castle.

In 1592, Sir Alexander Fraser of Philorth received charters from James VI of Scotland for the fishing village of Faithlie which later became the town of Fraserburgh. Sir Alexander Fraser was also authorized to found a university in the town but this scheme was short-lived due to the religious troubles of the time.

The eighth Laird of Philorth built Fraserburgh Castle, which later became the Kinnaird Head lighthouse. This bankrupted him and Philorth Castle was lost from the family for over three hundred years until 1934 when it was bought back by the 19th Lord Saltoun.

=== Lords Saltoun ===
==== 17th and 18th centuries ====
The ninth Laird of Philorth married the heiress of the Abernethy Lords Saltoun. Their son, Alexander Fraser, 11th Lord Saltoun, was severely wounded at the Battle of Worcester in 1651. He survived thanks to his servant, James Cardno, who rescued him from the battlefield. In 1666 the tenth Lord built Philorth House a mile from Fraserburgh which remained the family seat until it burned down in 1915.

Sir Alexander Fraser of Durris was personal physician to Charles II of England. He was educated at Aberdeen and accompanied the king on his campaign throughout 1650. After the Restoration he sat in the Scottish Parliament and he featured in the diaries of Samuel Pepys.

The Fraser family took no part in the Jacobite risings, although their distant Highland relatives in the Clan Fraser of Lovat were Jacobites.

==== 19th and 20th centuries ====
The sixteenth Lord Saltoun commanded the Light Companies of the First Guards at the Battle of Waterloo in 1815. The nineteenth Lord Saltoun was a prisoner of war during World War I in Germany. Later, in 1936 he became a member of the House of Lords and promoted the Royal National Lifeboat Institution.

== See also ==
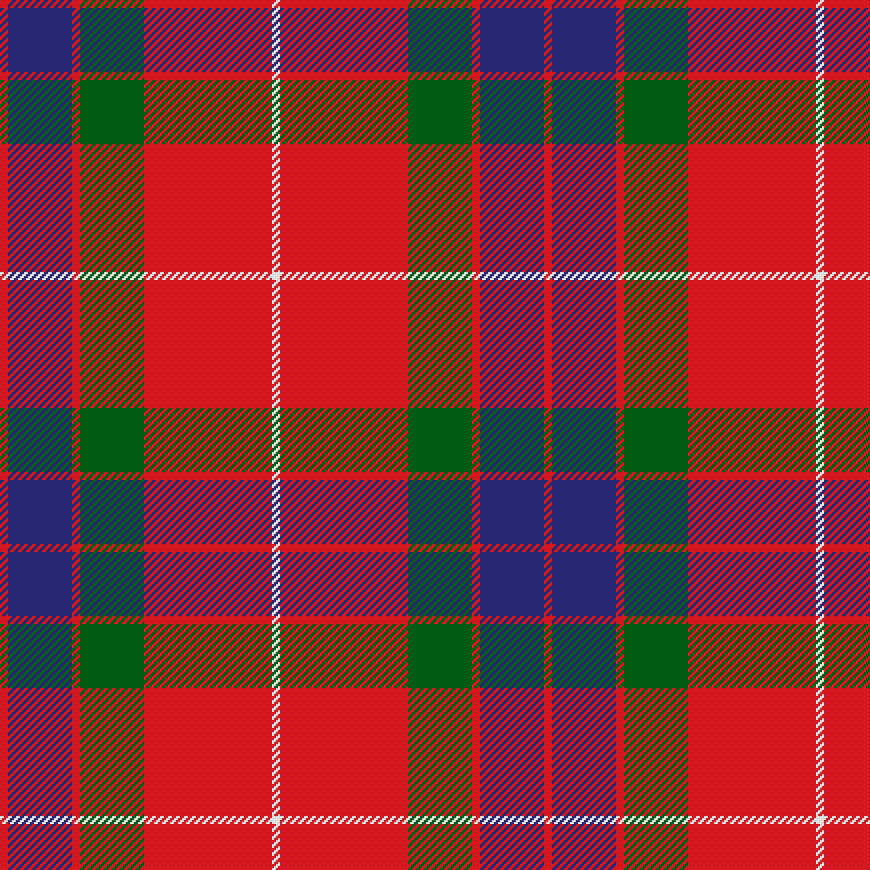
Clan Fraser Tartan

- Clan Fraser of Lovat
- Scottish clan
- Georgina Fraser Newhall, author of "Fraser's Drinking Song"
