= Frasers of Philorth =

The Frasers of Philorth are a Scottish Lowlands family, originally from the Anjou region of France. Castle Fraser, their family seat, is in Sauchen, Aberdeenshire, Scotland. Since the time of Alexander Fraser, 11th Lord Saltoun, the heads of the Philorth family are the Lords Saltoun. The current head of the Frasers of Philorth is Katharine Fraser, 22nd Lady Saltoun, who is Chief of the Name and Arms of Clan Fraser. The family's arms are "azure, three cinquefoils argent"—three silver strawberry flowers on a field of blue. The heraldic cinquefoil is a stylized five-point leaf; the cinquefoils which appear on the Fraser of Philorth coat-of-arms are specifically strawberry flowers. Only the Lady or Lord Saltoun is permitted to display these arms plain and undifferenced.

== History ==
Fraserburgh Alexander's grandson, also Alexander, married a daughter of the Earl of Ross, acquiring the lands of Philorth in Buchan, plus the castle of Cairnbulg, which has been the seat of the Fraser chiefs from that time forward.

In 1504, the family purchased a fishing community called Faithlie, by Kinnaird Head. On coming into possession in 1569, Sir Alexander, 8th Lord of Philorth, began to build "a large and beautiful town". He laid the foundation of the Tower of Kynnairdshead, since called the Castle of Fraserburgh, and built a church.

They created a burgh of barony in 1546.

In 1592, Alexander was given a charter by James VI for Faithlie. He improved the harbour, making the area a thriving town, which soon became a free port and burgh called Fraserburgh, a rival of Aberdeen.

Around 1596, the family built Pittulie Castle.

Fraserburgh was to have had a university, but the religious troubles and competition from Aberdeen stemmed the town’s growth. By building Fraserburgh Castle the Laird bankrupted himself, and had to sell the Philorth Castle, which passed out of the family for over 300 years until Alexander Fraser, 19th Lord Saltoun, bought it back in 1934. Alexander, 9th Lord of Philorth, married the heiress of the Lord Saltoun, a title borne by the Clan Fraser chiefs since that time.

The Chiefship was in dispute between the Frasers of Philorth and another branch, which also came from Tweeddale, the Frasers of Muchalls. In the reign of Charles I, the Frasers supported his rule in Scotland, as his father had granted them the lordship. In the Anglo-Scottish war, the Frasers fought against Oliver Cromwell. This act of rebellion meant that title of Lord Fraser was not long-lived, as many of the Fraser family began immigrating to the Americas during Cromwell's reign as Lord Protector. Many of the 1st Lord Fraser's sons settled in the newly founded colonies of Massachusetts, Virginia, and Maryland under the name "Frizzell". Many of these descendants married into prominent families in the Colonies, including the Carters of Corotoman, Virginia.

As for those who stayed in Scotland, Andrew, the 2nd Lord Fraser, remained in Kemnay at Castle Fraser until his death in 1623. His eldest son, the 3rd Lord Fraser, Alexander Fraser, 11th Lord Saltoun, and his brothers took part in the 1650 Battle of Dunbar under David Leslie, 1st Lord Newark. One of these brothers, James Fraser, ended up in Massachusetts (US) as "James Frizzell." In 1670, following the ascension of Charles II of England, the 3rd Lord Frazer's (11th Lord Saltoun) title was ratified by Parliament. Following the death of the 3rd Lord Fraser in 1693, the title passed to his grandson, William Fraser, 12th Lord Saltoun. The peerage expired with the 4th Lord Fraser, who died in 1716 while on the run as a result of his participation in The Fifteen.
