= Alexander Ramsay of Mar =

Scottish soldier and aristocrat (1919–2000)

Captain Alexander Ramsay of Mar DL
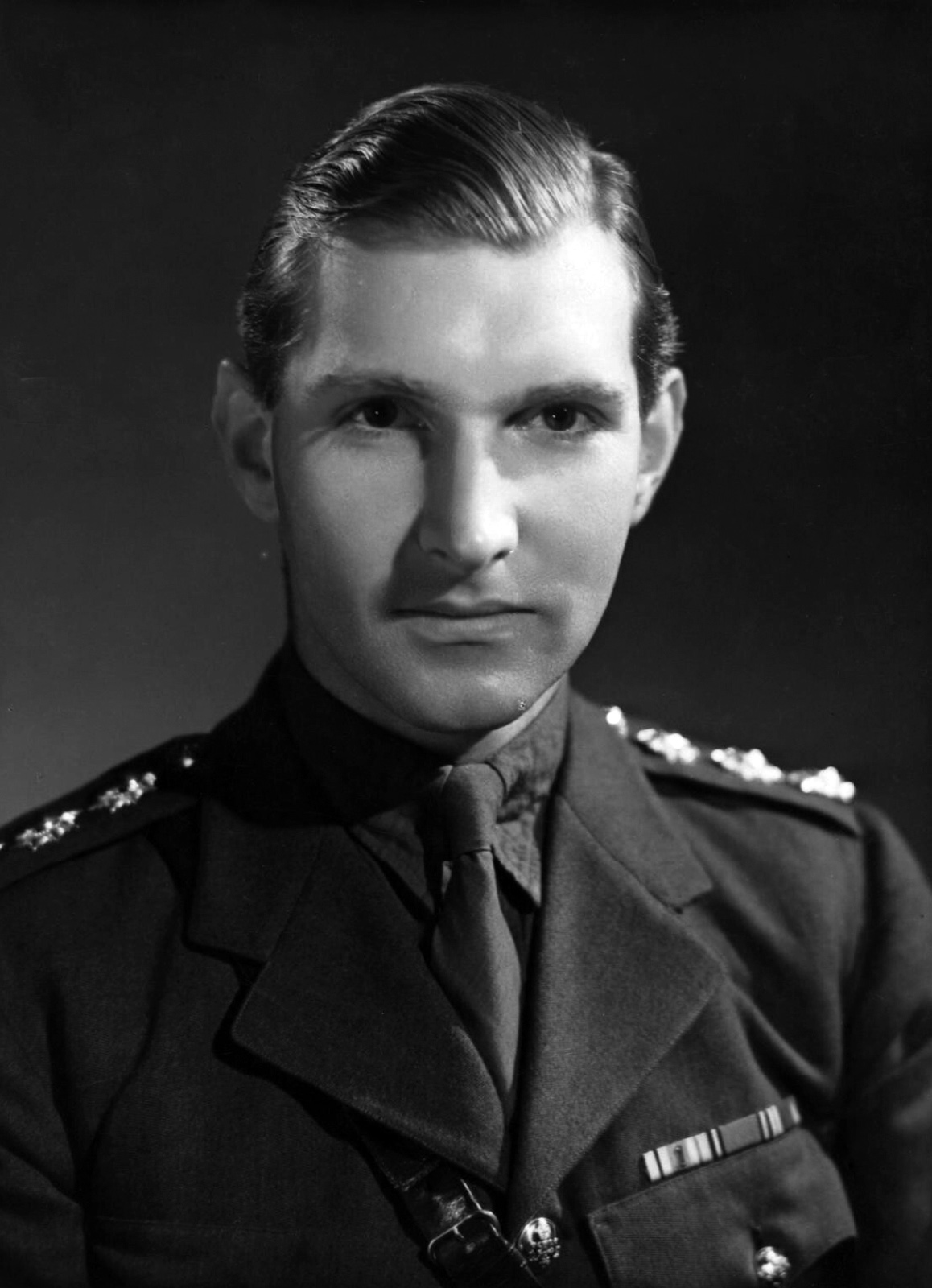
- Capt. Alexander Ramsay of Mar, 1944

Personal details
- Born: Alexander Arthur Alfonso David Maule Ramsay; 21 December 1919 Clarence House, London, England
- Died: 20 December 2000 (aged 80) Mar Lodge Estate, Inverey, Aberdeenshire
- Spouse: Flora Fraser, 21st Lady Saltoun (m. 1956)
- Children: 3; including Katharine Fraser, 22nd Lady Saltoun
- Parent(s): The Hon. Sir Alexander Ramsay; Princess Patricia of Connaught
- Education: Eton College; Trinity College, Oxford

Alexander Arthur Alfonso David Maule Ramsay of Mar, DL (21 December 1919 – 20 December 2000) was the only child of Princess Patricia of Connaught, who renounced her royal title and style when she married then-Captain the Hon. Alexander Ramsay in February 1919. His mother was the youngest child of Prince Arthur, Duke of Connaught, the third son of Queen Victoria and Prince Albert. His father was the third son of John Ramsay, 13th Earl of Dalhousie. Through the marriage of his maternal aunt, Princess Margaret of Connaught, to the Swedish prince who later became King Gustav VI Adolf of Sweden, his first cousins included Prince Gustaf Adolf, Duke of Västerbotten, whose son later became King Carl XVI Gustaf of Sweden; and Princess Ingrid of Sweden, who later became Queen of Denmark after marrying the Danish prince who later became King Frederik IX of Denmark.

== Biography ==
Alexander Arthur Alfonso David Maule Ramsay, Baron of Braemar, was born on 21 December 1919 in his mother's bathroom at Clarence House, then the London residence of his maternal grandfather, the Duke of Connaught. His baptism was held on 23 February 1920 at the Chapel Royal at St James's Palace and attended by King George V and Queens Mary and Alexandra; Princess Louise, Duchess of Argyll; and Princess Victoria. His godparents were the Prince of Wales (later King Edward VIII), King Alfonso XIII of Spain, the Princess Royal, Princess Christian, Princess Helena Victoria, and Commander Bolton Eyres-Monsell.

He, along with his cousin Viscount Lascelles, acted as a page of honour during the coronation of George VI and Elizabeth. After leaving Eton College the same year, he received a commission in the Grenadier Guards. He saw active service in North Africa during the Second World War. He lost his right leg during a tank battle in Tunisia in 1943. In 1944, he joined the staff of his second cousin, the Duke of Gloucester, who was then Governor-General of Australia.

Upon returning to Britain in 1947, he was informed that he would inherit Mar Lodge and its estates from his aunt, Princess Arthur of Connaught, Duchess of Fife. In preparation for this role, he read agriculture at Trinity College, Oxford. After graduating in 1952, he worked for three years as assistant factor on the Linlithgow estates at South Queensferry. Ramsay inherited the Mar estate, becoming the new Laird of Mar and Lord and Baron of Braemar, in 1959. At that point, Lord Lyon King of Arms allowed him to add the designation "of Mar" to his name. Part of the estate had to be sold to pay inheritance tax and became Mar Lodge Estate.

In 1956, Ramsay married Flora Fraser (18 October 1930 – 3 September 2024), the only daughter of Alexander Fraser, 20th Lord Saltoun, and chief of the Name of Fraser. His wife succeeded her father as the 21st Lady Saltoun and chief of the Name of Fraser in 1979. Thereafter, they resided at his wife's family seat, Cairnbulg Castle at Fraserburgh, in Aberdeenshire. In 1971, he became the deputy lord lieutenant for Aberdeenshire.

Although the Ramsays of Mar had no royal titles and carried out no public duties, they attended most major royal events, and were the heads of many Scottish Feudal Baronies, including MacDuff, named for James Duff, 2nd Earl Fife. Alexander Ramsay of Mar died at his estate in Inverey, Braemar, after a short illness, on 20 December 2000—the eve of his 81st birthday.

== Family ==
Captain Alexander Ramsay of Mar and Lady Saltoun had three daughters:

- Katherine Ingrid Mary Isabel Fraser, 22nd Lady Saltoun (born 11 October 1957). She married Captain Mark Malise Nicolson (born 29 September 1954) on 3 May 1980. They have three children:
  - Hon. Louise Alexandra Patricia Nicolson (born 2 September 1984). She married Charles Christopher Thomas Morshead (born December 1981) on 25 May 2013. They have two children:
    - Rory Thomas Malise Morshead (born 27 May 2015)
    - Frederick Charles Merlin Morshead (born 15 March 2018)
  - Hon. Juliet Victoria Katharine Nicolson (born 3 March 1988). She married Simon Alexander Rood (born 1985) on 11 July 2015. They have three children:
    - Albert Alexander Gordon Rood (born 7 June 2018)
    - Edmund Walter Nicolson Rood (born 11 December 2020)
    - Xanthe Victoria Ingrid Rood (born 2 August 2023)
  - Hon. Alexander William Malise Fraser, Master of Saltoun (born 5 July 1990)
- Hon. Alice Elizabeth Margaret Ramsay of Mar (born 8 July 1961, Edinburgh). She married David Ramsey on 28 July 1990. They have four children:
  - Alexander David Ramsey (b. 4 August 1991)
  - Victoria Alice Ramsey (b. 1994)
  - George Arthur Ramsey (b. 28 September 1995)
  - Oliver Henry Ramsey (b. 28 September 1995)
- Hon. Elizabeth Alexandra Mary Ramsay of Mar (born 15 April 1963, Inverness)
