= Quartering (heraldry) =

Method of joining several different coats of arms together

Example of the simplest case of quartering two coats of arms

The royal arms of England under the House of Stuart (1603-1707) with the arms of England and France in "grand quarters" (repeated) and the arms of Scotland and Ireland quartered

The complex quarterings of the grand arms of Francis II, the last Holy Roman Emperor

Quartering is a method of joining several different coats of arms together in one shield by dividing the shield into equal parts and placing different coats of arms in each division.

Typically, a quartering consists of a division into four equal parts, two above and two below (party per cross). Occasionally the division is instead along both diagonals (party per saltire) again creating four parts but now at top, bottom, left, and right.

An example of party per cross is the coat of arms of the United Kingdom, as used outside Scotland, which consists of four quarters, displaying the Arms of England, Scotland and Ireland, with the coat for England repeated at the end. (In the royal arms as used in Scotland, the Scottish coat appears in the first and fourth quarters and the English one second.). An example of party per saltire is the arms of the medieval Kingdom of Sicily which also consists of four sections, with top and bottom displaying the coat of the Crown of Aragon, and left and right the coat of the Sicily branch of the Hohenstaufen dynasty during their reign as Holy Roman Emperors.

In most traditions, there is no limit on the number of divisions allowed. For example, the records of the College of Arms include a shield of 323 quarterings for the family of Lloyd of Stockton. These 323 quarterings include numerous repeated attributed arms assigned to Welsh chieftains from the 9th century or earlier.

Another example of a shield of many quarterings is the coat of arms of the Powys-Lybbe family, which contains 64 quarterings. Different rules apply in Scottish heraldry, and may well apply in other jurisdictions like Canada and South Africa.

The arms of the King of the United Kingdom are arms of dominion, which join together the arms of the ex-kingdoms now part of his kingdom. However, the vast majority of quarterly coats of arms display arms which are claimed by descent: in other words, they join together coats of arms of the ancestors of the bearer of the arms.

Strict rules apply in English Heraldry, both as to what arms may be displayed by way of quarterings, and the order in which they may be displayed. Men and women are always entitled to display the arms of their paternal line but are not usually entitled to display by way of quartering the arms of families from whom there is descent only through a female line (for example, the arms of a mother or grandmother or great-grandmother). An exception is made, however, if the female who breaks the male line of descent is a heraldic heiress—a woman who has no brothers, or whose brothers have died without issue. Such a woman is entitled to transmit her father's arms to her own children, who add them as a quartering. If her father was himself entitled to one or more quarterings, these will pass to his daughters' children as quarterings as well. Quarterings are displayed in the order in which they are acquired by a family by marriage, starting with those acquired by the earliest marriage to bring in quarterings. It is permissible to omit quarterings, but if a quartering was brought in by a later quartering, it is essential to show the whole chain of quarterings leading to the quartering displayed, or else to omit the chain altogether.

Grand quarters of the Dukes of St Albans

The larger the number of quarterings, the smaller the space available for each coat of arms, so that most families entitled to many quarterings make a selection of those they ordinarily use. The Duke of Norfolk, for example, uses only four quarterings, although he is entitled to many more. In Scotland in some cases the plain unquartered coat is the more prized, as entitlement to its use can indicate who is chief of the name and arms and holds the headship of a clan. For example, Flora Fraser, Lady Saltoun of Abernethy had arms as chief of Fraser—the plain coat of 'azure, three fraises argent'—and a 'private' quartered coat. The Powys-Lybbe family appear, likewise, to usually use only the quarterings of Powys and Lybbe. However these are not true quarterings as the arms were changed in 1907 to be an impartible design of the two arms; the personal arms are precisely this design, with no quarterings despite its appearance. (If this were a quartering the following would apply: when only two different coats of arms are shown, each one is repeated twice in order to fill up the minimum number of four quarterings on such a display.) Prior to the 1907 change, the family did quarter their arms with Lybbe but with the Powys arms in the top left quarter as these were the family arms; the new design has Lybbe in the top left as Lybbe is the last part of the name.

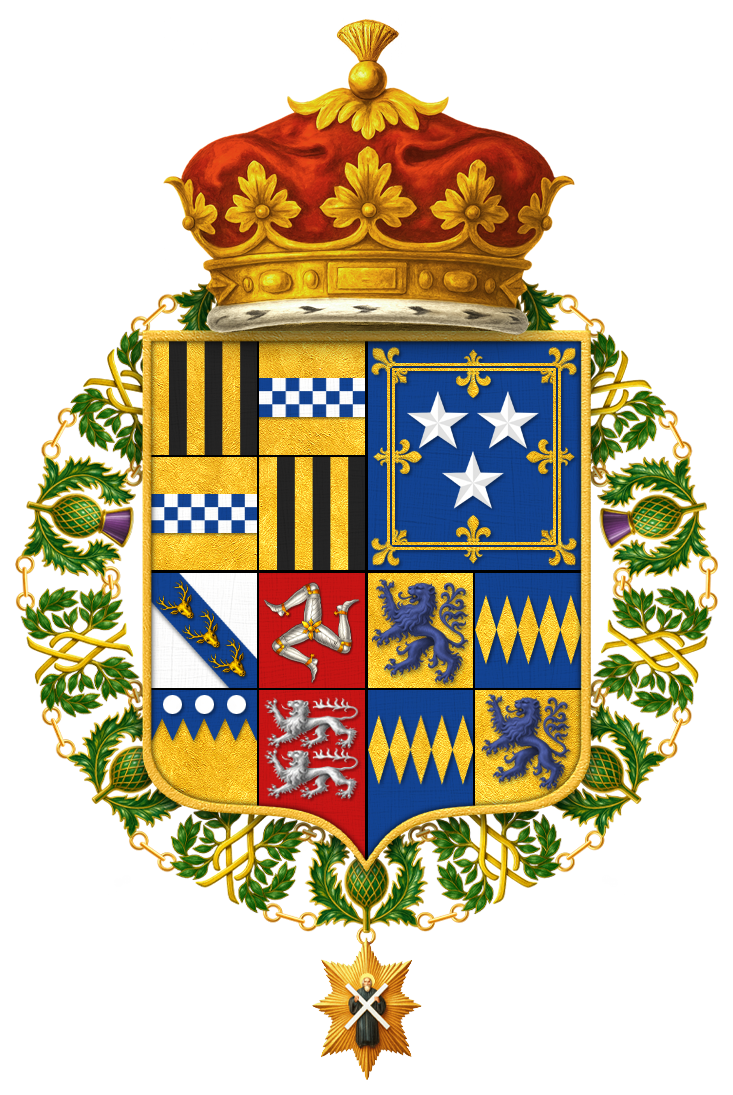
Grand quarterings of the 8th Duke of Atholl KT GCVO CB DSO PC

"Grand quartering", which is where one or more quarters are themselves divided into smaller quarters to accommodate the extra coats, is still widely observed in Scotland, and to some extent in England. A Scottish example is the arms of Lord Elphinstone, where the arms of Elphinstone occupies the first grand quarter, Fullerton the third, Buller the fourth, and the second is itself quartered with the arms of Fleming, Fraser, Keith and Drummond. An English example of grand quartering is the arms of the Latymer School in Edmonton, London, which has Edward Latymer's own arms in the first and fourth grand quarters, and the second and third are quartered with the arms of Freston and Wolverstone.

== See also ==
- Division of the field
- Quartering of Castile and León, the first use of this method
- Seize quartiers [French: "Sixteen Quarters"] - A proof of nobility with an illuminated display of the coats of arms of a armigerous person's four previous generations.
