= Inverallochy Castle =

Coordinates: 57.65641°N 1.93308°W

- near Inverallochy, Aberdeenshire in Scotland
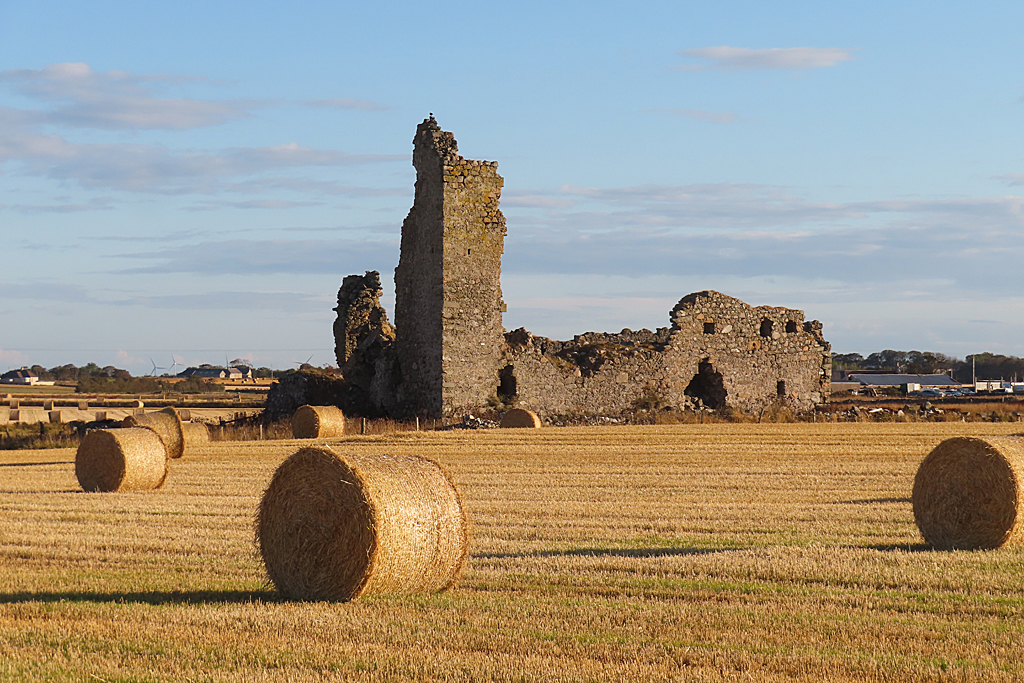
- Ruins of Inverallochy Castle in 2025

Site information
- Condition: Ruined

Scheduled monument
- Official name: Inverallochy Castle
- Type: Secular: castle
- Designated: 11 October 1960
- Reference no.: SM97

Inverallochy Castle is a ruined courtyard castle, near the village of Inverallochy in the Buchan area of North-East Scotland, dating to 1504. It lies 0.5 miles (0.80 km) south of Cairnbulg Castle, near Fraserburgh, and formerly stood beside the now-drained Loch of Inverallochy. It was described by W. Douglas Simpson as one of the nine castles of the Knuckle, referring to the rocky headland of North-East Aberdeenshire.

== Description ==
The remains of buildings are arranged around three sides of a courtyard, with a curtain wall across the south side. A tower in the north-east corner remains largely to its full height, while the remaining curtain wall stands up to 10 m high. The internal walls have largely collapsed. Evidence of a larger outer courtyard measuring approximately 60 metres (200 ft) square to the north and east remains. The ruins are protected as a scheduled monument. The castle appears to have been built all at once, and architectural evidence suggests an early 16th-century date. It may have been the work of Sir William Comyn (or Cumyng) of Inverallochy, who was Lord Lyon in 1512–1519.

== Inscribed stone ==
Until the latter half of the 18th century, there was a stone inserted above the entrance, bearing the sculptured arms of the Comyns, with an inscription "recording that the estate around it was obtained by Jordan Comyn for building the abbey of Deer".
