= Kinnaird Head =

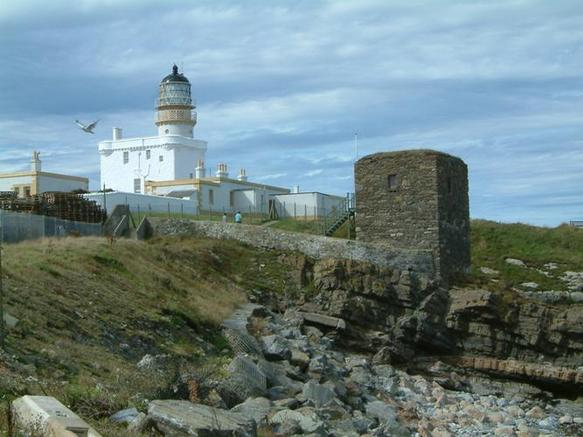
- Kinnaird Head, showing the lighthouse, formerly Kinnaird Castle, and the Wine Tower

- Location within Aberdeenshire
- Coordinates: 57°41′51″N 2°00′14″W
- Country: Scotland
- County: Aberdeenshire
- Town: Fraserburgh

Kinnaird Head (Scottish Gaelic: An Ceann Àrd, "high headland") is a headland projecting into the North Sea, within the town of Fraserburgh, Aberdeenshire, on the east coast of Scotland. The 16th-century Kinnaird Castle was converted in 1787 for use as the Kinnaird Head Lighthouse, the first lighthouse in Scotland to be lit by the Commissioners of Northern Lights. Kinnaird Castle and the nearby Wine Tower were described by W. Douglas Simpson as two of the nine castles of the Knuckle, referring to the rocky headland of north-east Aberdeenshire. The lighthouse is a category A listed building. and the Wine Tower (perhaps from Wynd Tower). is a scheduled monument. The buildings around the base of the lighthouse are the work of Robert Stevenson.

== Kinnaird Castle ==
Kinnaird Head Castle, also known as Fraserburgh Castle and Kinnairdshead Castle, was begun in March 1570. The builder was Sir Alexander Fraser, 8th laird of Philorth (c.1536–1623), who also transformed the fishing village of Faithlie into the burgh of Fraserburgh in the 1590s. However, the building of the castle led to such expenses that he was forced to sell Philorth Castle, the family home.

Alexander, 10th of Philorth, fought for the king at the Battle of Worcester (1651). Despite being badly wounded, he survived to live into his eighties. In 1669 he inherited the title of Lord Saltoun, and in later years he had apartments at Kinnaird Castle The last people to reside in the castle were Henrietta Fraser (1698–1751) daughter of the 12th Lord Saltoun, and her husband John Gordon of Kinellar (1684–1764). In 1787, it was leased to the Trustees of the Northern Lights, who turned it into Kinnaird Head Lighthouse. Designed by Thomas Smith, the lamp was first lit on 1 December. The structure was rebuilt in the 1820s and superseded by a new lighthouse in 1991. It now houses the Museum of Scottish Lighthouses, which incorporates the original lighthouse and a modern building housing collections of lenses and other artifacts from many lighthouses across Scotland.

== Wine tower ==
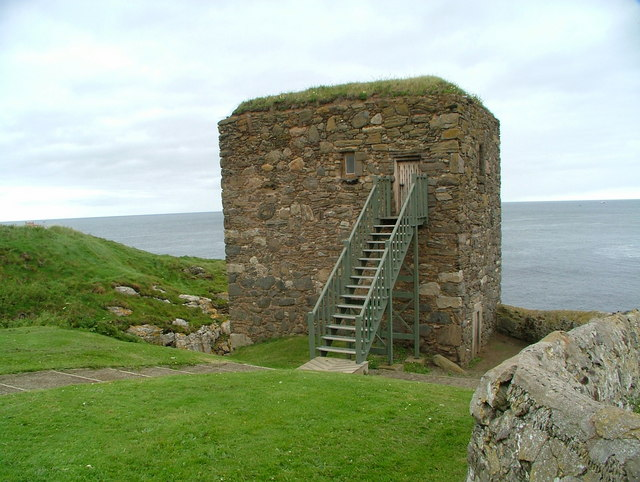
The Wine Tower

The wine tower is a small, three-storey tower located approximately 50 metres (160 ft) from Kinnaird Head Lighthouse. The tower has been dated back to the 16th century and may have gained its name through use as a store associated with the castle. The tower is accessed via the second floor and contains elaborate carved stone pendants, reputedly the result of its use as a covert chapel for the Catholic wife of Protestant Alexander Fraser. It is reputed that in the cave below, one of the Fraser family imprisoned his daughter's boyfriend, leaving him to drown there. The daughter then jumped from the roof of the tower. There is red paint on the rocks below to illustrate her blood. According to local tradition, the tower is said to be haunted.
