= Charles Ferm =

Scottish Presbyterian minister (1566–1617)

Charles Ferme MA
- Born: 1566/7; Edinburgh
- Died: 24 September 1617 (aged 51); Fraserburgh
- Resting place: Kirkton Cemetery, Fraserburgh
- Education: University of Edinburgh
- Occupations: Pastor, Academic
- Title: Principal of Fraserburgh University
- Term: 1600-17
- Children: 1

Charles Ferm, Ferme, Farholme or Fairholm (c. 1566–1617), was a leading campaigning Presbyterian minister in the Church of Scotland, and the Principal of the short lived Fraserburgh University, Scotland.

== Early life and education ==
Ferm was born in Edinburgh of obscure parentage. His name is spelled in diverse ways; he signs himself 'Carolus Pharum' (after 1588), and 'Chairlis Ferm' (21 February 1605). Calderwood spells the name 'Farholme.' Adamson Latinises it 'Fermæus.' He was brought up in the family of Alexander Guthrie, town-clerk of Edinburgh, and entered the University of Edinburgh in 1584. In 1588 he graduated M.A., and in October of that year was an unsuccessful candidate for a regency. On 13 December 1589 he was authorised by the presbytery to preach, when necessary, in the second charge of the High Kirk, Edinburgh. He studied Hebrew and theology, and was elected regent in 1590, in which capacity he graduated a class of nineteen on 12 August 1593, and another of thirty-five on 30 July 1597. Among his pupils were John Adamson, Edward Brice, David Calderwood, Oliver Colt, professor of Latin at Saumur, and William Craig, professor of theology there.

== Church career ==
In 1596 and again in 1597 'Mr. Charles Fairme' was called to the proposed second charge at Haddington, but he preferred his college work. On 12 September 1598 'Mr. Charles Ferume' preached in the High Kirk of Edinburgh, later in the same year he was reported as 'gane to the north parts.' He accepted the charge of Philorth, Aberdeenshire, incorporated in 1613 under the name of Fraserburgh, the intention of the patron, Sir Alexander Fraser (d. 1623), being that Ferm should be the head of a university which he had established. Fraser had obtained a royal grant (1 July 1592), confirming his possession of the lands of Philorth, and giving him powers to erect and endow a college and university. A 'spacious quadrangular building' was erected in the northern part of Fraserburgh. In 1594 the project was approved by parliament, which on 13 December 1597 endowed the university with the revenues of the parishes of 'Phillorthe, Tyrie, Kremound, and Rathyn.' The General Assembly of the Church of Scotland in 1597 sanctioned the appointment of Ferm as principal; but it appears that he expected to resign his pastoral charge. On 21 March 1600, Fraser having 'refusit to intertaine a Pastour ... vnlesse he vndertake both the said charges', the assembly enjoined Ferm to fill both offices.

== Conflict with King and Privy Council ==
Ferm's robust Presbyterianism got him into trouble on the reconstitution of episcopacy. In October 1600 Peter Blackburn was appointed bishop of Aberdeen, with a seat in parliament. Ferm denounced this innovation. In February 1605 he appeared before the Privy Council with John Forbes, to justify their excommunication of the Earl of Huntly. He was a delegate to the General Assembly which met at Aberdeen on 2 July, and was about to hold proceedings, contrary to the king's injunction. For this irregularity, Ferm and around 20 others were arrested and interrogated; some apologised and were released, but thirteen were imprisoned in various castles across Scotland; on 3 October Ferme was confined to Doune Castle, Perthshire, at his own expenses. Confined with him in Doune was another attendee at the Aberdeen general assembly, John Munro of Tain. On 24 October he was summoned to appear before the privy council, but would not own its authority in causes spiritual, and, along with Munro, made his escape. He was again cited for 24 February 1607, appeared before the council on 20 May, and again escaped, hiding himself for four days in Edinburgh.

Although Ferm had been condemned to a period of banishment on the island of Bute, it is by no means certain that he was ever there. His first escape, from the castle of Doune, took place at a time when he was being transferred from Doune into the custody of depute-sheriffs who were due to deliver him to Bute; and after the second escape, from Edinburgh, there is no mention in the records of recapture or imprisonment . A contemporary, John Forbes, suggests that Ferm had indeed been imprisoned on Bute for three years; but Forbes himself had been exiled to France in 1606, and was in no position to know what had happened to his colleagues in Scotland. The minutes of the Presbytery of Deer, to which the Fraserburgh church reported, indicate that Ferm was never absent from Fraserburgh for more than three months between 1607 and 1610.

== Later life ==
He appears to have received the stipend of Philorth (86l. 17s. 9d. – n.b. this was an amount in Pounds Scots) in 1607, but not in 1608, in which year he suffered much privation. At some time after 1609, he was restored to his parish. In 1615, Ferm was twice proposed to fill the vacancy of Principal at Marischal College in Aberdeen, but the appointment went to another candidate. He died on 24 September 1617, aged 51; his gravestone is still visible on the site of the old church of Philorth, in the Kirkton Cemetery in Fraserburgh.

== Family ==
Ferm was married, but neither the name of his wife, nor the date of their marriage, have yet been discovered. The couple had a daughter, named Agnes. She was born in November 1606, probably in Aberdeen, since she was christened in St Nicholas Church there (information from Scotland's People archival records). After Ferm's death, it is likely that both widow and daughter moved to Tain; Agnes married a merchant there, Andrew McCulloch of Glastullich, who subsequently became an MP in the Scottish Parliament. The couple had two sons. McCulloch married for a second time in 1651, so it must be supposed that Agnes had died shortly before then.

== Works ==
Ferm published nothing in his lifetime, but after his death two of his manuscripts were given to Adamson by a pupil, William Rires. Adamson intended to publish them both, but text entitled 'Lectiones in Esterem' ('Commentaries on the Book of Esther' ) was not published, and is lost. The 'Analysis Logica in Epistolam Apostoli Pauli ad Romanos, &c.' ('Logical Analysis of the Epistle of Paul to the Romans'), Edinburgh, 1651, 8vo, is all that remains of Ferm's work. A translation, by William Skae, was issued by the Wodrow Society, 1850, 8vo.

== References and further reading ==
- Alexander, William (1850). A Logical Analysis etc… with a Life of Ferme. Edinburgh, Scotland.
- Calderwood, David (1842). The History of the Kirk of Scotland, Vol.6. Edinburgh, Scotland.
- Cranna, John (1914). Fraserburgh: Past and Present. Aberdeen, Scotland.
- Drummond, Andy (2023). "Debosched Horneris and Contemptuous and Seditious Assemblies: The Life and Times of Charles Ferme (1566-1617)". Scottish Local History (116): 37–43.
- FNR (1890). "The Ross Family". Scottish Antiquary. 5. Edinburgh, Scotland.
- Forbes, John (1846). Certaine Records Touching the Estate of the Kirk etc. Edinburgh, Scotland.
- Masson, David (1885). The Register of the Privy Council of Scotland, Vol.7. Edinburgh, Scotland.
- Spalding, John (1850). Memorialls of the Trubles in Scotland and in England, Vol.1. Edinburgh, Scotland.
- "Ferme, Charles". Our History. University of Edinburgh. 2015.
- Gordon, Alexander (1885–1900). "Ferme, Charles". (revised by Macdonald, Alan R., 2009). Oxford Dictionary of National Biography.
