= Pittulie Castle =

- Rosehearty, Aberdeenshire in Scotland
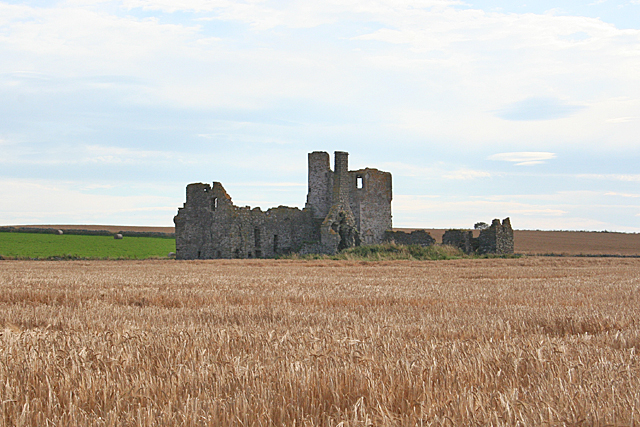
- The castle in 2016

Site information
- Condition: Ruined

Location
- Coordinates: 57.6928°N 2.0939°W

Scheduled monument
- Official name: Pittulie Castle
- Type: Secular: castle; manor house
- Designated: 11 February 1993
- Reference no.: SM5578

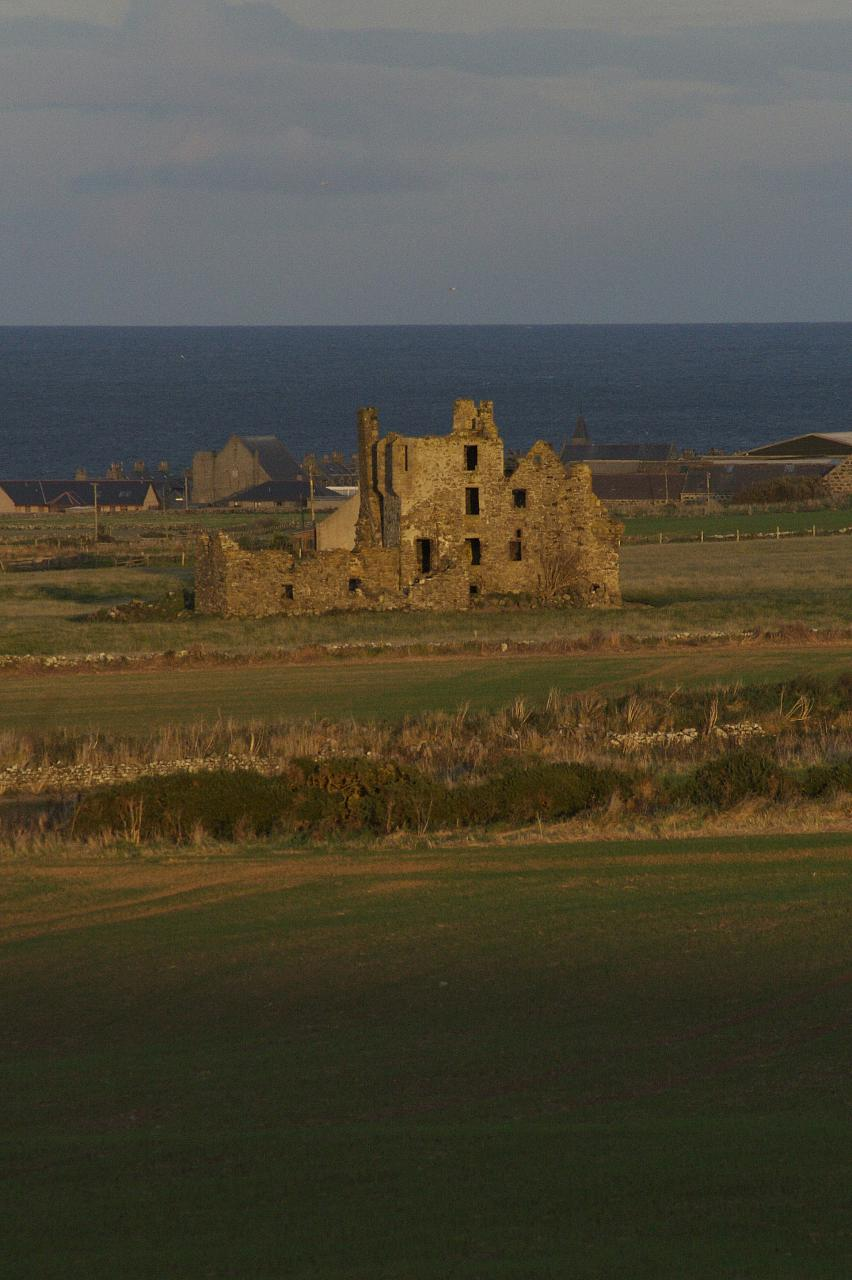
Pittulie Castle from the west

Pittulie Castle is an oblong tower house probably dating from 1596, half a mile from Pitsligo Castle, Rosehearty, Aberdeenshire, Scotland. It is a scheduled monument. Built by the Frasers of Philorth, it was described by W. Douglas Simpson as one of the nine castles of the Knuckle, referring to the rocky headland of north-east Aberdeenshire.

== History ==
The present castle probably replaces a previous castle on the site. It is thought that the castle was built for the marriage of Alexander Fraser and Margaret Abernethy of Saltoun in 1596. This marriage led to the Frasers inheriting the Saltoun peerage. The Cumines acquired and enlarged the property. It was purchased by Sir William Forbes, 6th Baronet, towards the end of the 18th century, but subsequently abandoned.

== Structure ==
The castle comprises an oblong block, which has a square tower at the corner to the north-east. There are angle turrets, where are notably low, on the gables to the south-east and south-west. The main tower has two storeys and an attic. It is decorated with armorial panels, a pediment above the main door and two "beautifully constructed" oriel windows. The main stair only reaches the first floor. From the hall a turreted stair on the north front rises higher. A turreted stair, corbelled out from the second floor, leads to the upper floors. Originally the entrance was by the north front.

== See also ==
- Castles in Great Britain and Ireland
- List of castles in Scotland
