= Nine castles of the Knuckle =

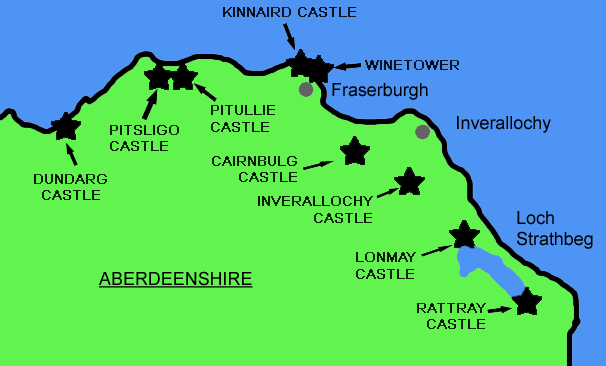
Nine castles of the Knuckle

The nine castles of the Knuckle are a group of ancient castles found in Aberdeenshire in the Buchan area of Scotland. The term was used by historian William Douglas Simpson, who described the promontory between the Moray Firth and the North Sea as "the north-eastern knuckle of Scotland". From west to east, the castles are Dundarg, Pitsligo, Pitullie, Kinnaird, Wine Tower, Cairnbulg, Inverallochy, Lonmay and Rattray. Although Simpson coined the term, he did not draw any connections between the sites, other than their location.

Castle	Image	OS Grid Reference	Built by	Construction date	Destruction date	Current condition
Cairnbulg Castle		NK017640	Comyn family; rebuilt by Fraser Family	13th century; rebuilt c.1380	N/A	Inhabited
Dundarg Castle		NJ895648	Comyn family (?)	13th century	1334	Ruin
Inverallochy Castle		NK040628	Comyn family			Ruin, few remains
Kinnaird Castle		NJ999675	Alexander Fraser of Philorth	1570	N/A	Converted into lighthouse
Lonmay Castle		NK063605				No remains
Pitsligo Castle		NJ937670	Fraser family	1424		Ruin
Pittulie Castle		NJ944670	16th century			Ruin
Castle of Rattray		NK088578	Comyn family (possibly by William Comyn, jure uxoris Earl of Buchan)	Late 12th or early 13th century	15th century	No remains
Winetower		NJ999675	Unknown	16th century	N/A	Preserved
