= Alexander Fraser (died 1623) =

Sir Alexander Fraser of Philorth
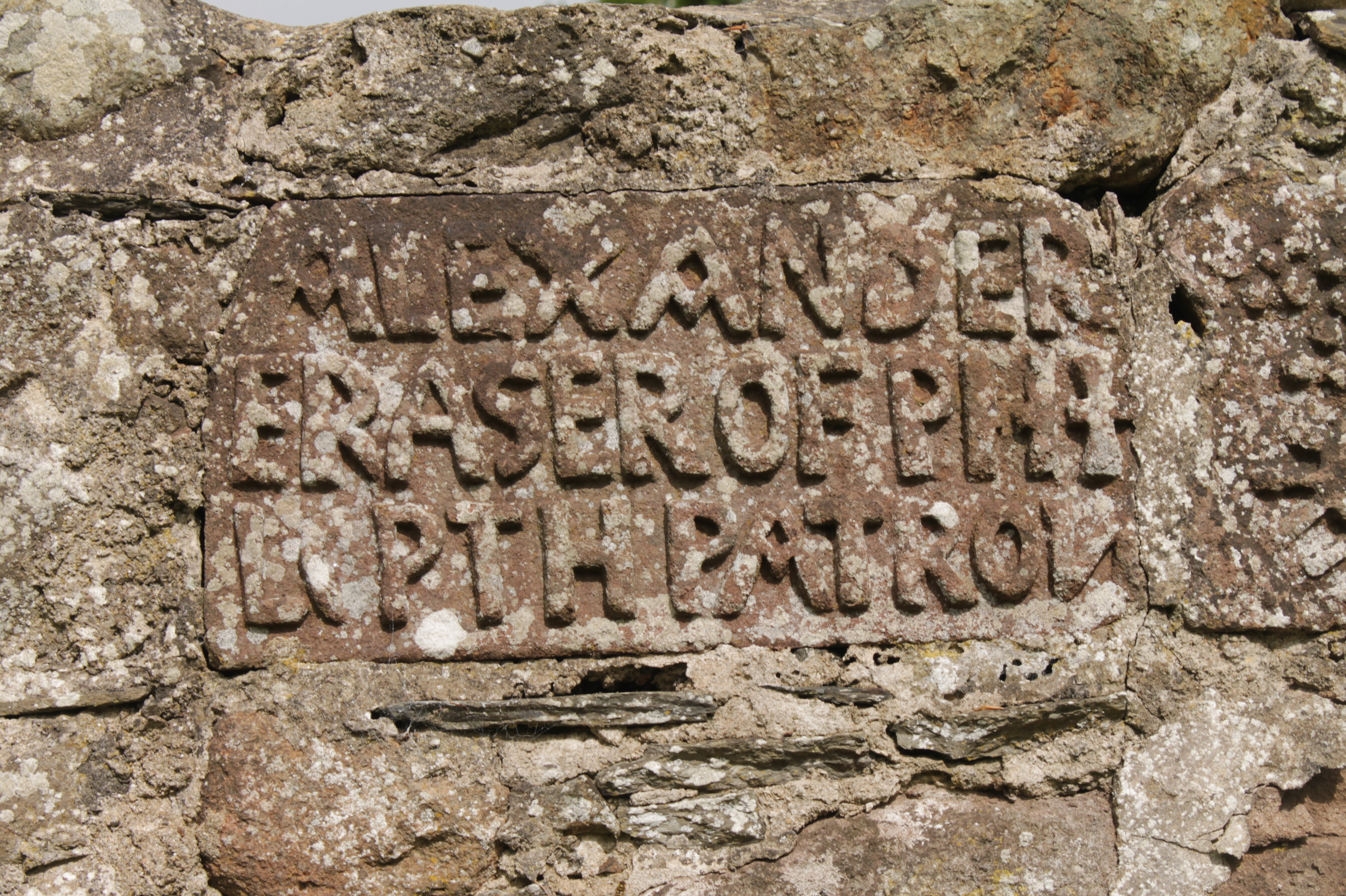
- Patron stone to Alexander Fraser of Philorth, old Rathen church
- Born: 1537?
- Died: 12 April 1623
- Occupations: Noble, Landowner
- Title: 9th Laird of Philorth
- Spouses: Magdalen Ogilvie; Elizabeth Maxwell (1606-)
- Children: Alexander Fraser of Philorth; Margaret Fraser

Alexander Fraser of Philorth (died 1623) was a Scottish landowner and founder of Fraserburgh.

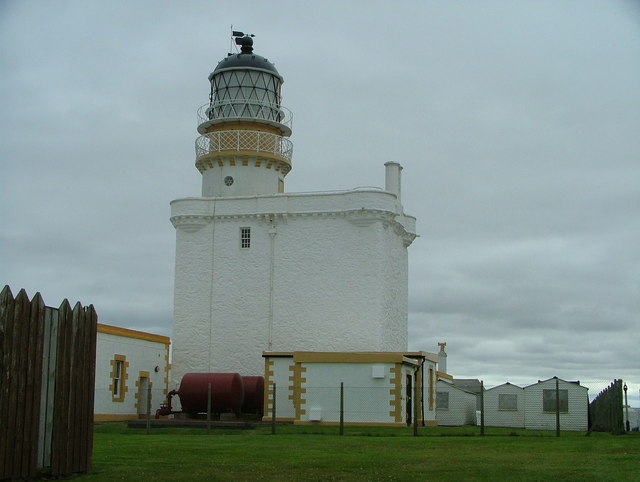
Alexander Fraser's castle at Kinnaird Head was converted into a lighthouse in 1787

He was the eldest son of Alexander Fraser (died 1564) younger of Philorth and Beatrix Keith, a sister of William Keith, 4th Earl Marischal. Their home at Philorth is now known as Cairnbulg Castle.

In March 1570 he started building a tower at Kinnaird Head and a church nearby. He continued to develop the harbour at Faithlie, the modern Fraserburgh, and commenced building a new harbour in 1576. In 1592 he obtained a charter to found a college or university, which was confirmed in 1597, resulting in the short-lived Fraserburgh University, which closed in 1605.

James VI wrote to him in April 1589 asking for money to advance his projected marriage with Anne of Denmark. He was knighted at the baptism of Prince Henry at Stirling Castle on 30 August 1594. Fellow knights, including John Boswell of Balmuto had also contributed to the funds for the royal wedding.

Most sources attest that he died on the 12th of April 1623, though some state July 1623.

There is a portrait of him depicted around the year 1597, including a small dog. The National Museum of Scotland has a pair of small miniatures of Alexander Fraser and his wife Magdalen Ogilvie. These were probably originally set within lockets of gold enamel work like similar Scottish examples.

== Marriages and children ==
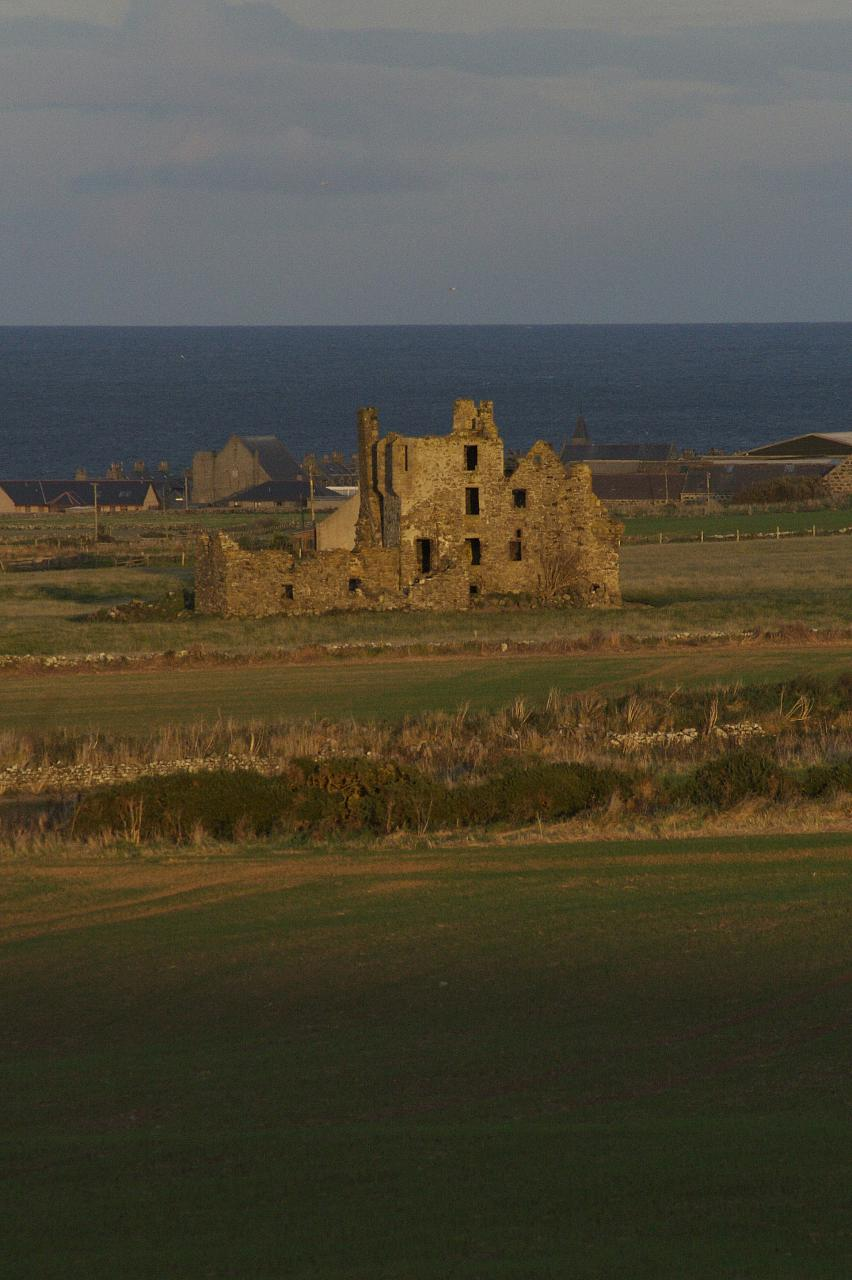
Alexander Fraser younger built Pittulie Castle in the 1590s

Fraser married Magdalen Ogilvie, daughter of Walter Ogilvie of Dunlugas. He married a second wife Elizabeth Maxwell in 1606, a daughter of John, Lord Herries, and widow of John Gordon of Lochinvar. Her son, Robert Gordon of Lochinvar was knighted at Stirling in 1594.

The children of Alexander Fraser and Magdalen Ogilvie included:

- Alexander Fraser of Philorth, who married Margaret Abernethy, a daughter of George Abernethy, Lord Saltoun in 1595. He built a tower and courtyard at Pittullie near Fraserburgh. Their eldest son was Alexander Fraser, 11th Lord Saltoun
- Margaret Fraser, who married William Hay of Urie
