= Flora Fraser, 21st Lady Saltoun =

Scottish hereditary peer (1930–2024)

The Right Honourable The Lady Saltoun
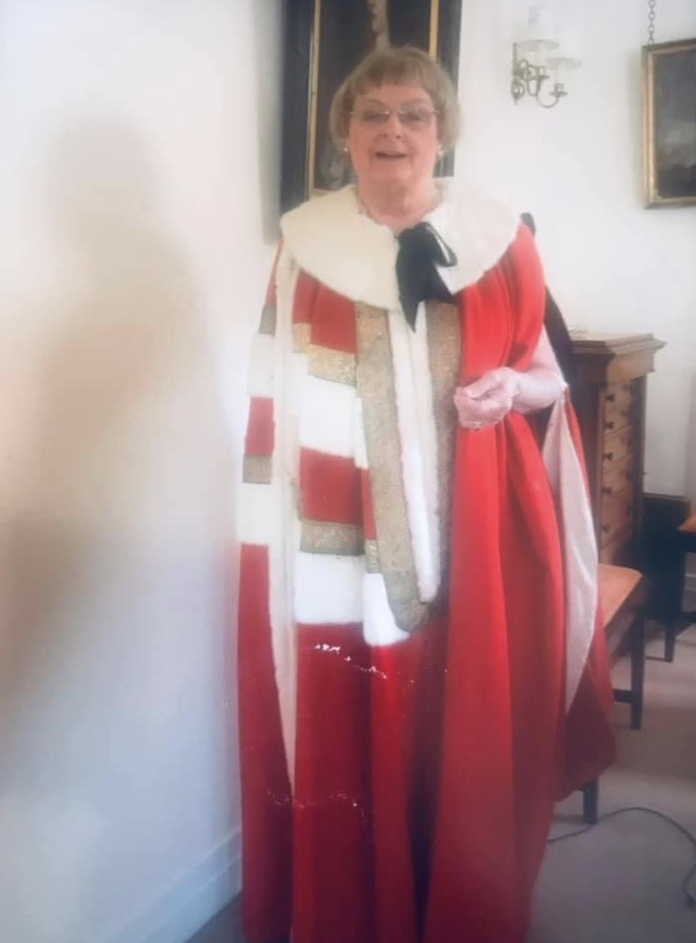
- Saltoun in 2005 in her parliamentary robes

Member of the House of Lords
- Lord Temporal
- Hereditary peerage 3 December 1979 – 11 November 1999
- Preceded by: The 20th Lord Saltoun
- Succeeded by: Seat abolished
- Elected Hereditary Peer; 11 November 1999 – 12 December 2014
- Election: 1999
- Preceded by: Seat established
- Succeeded by: The 16th Earl of Kinnoull

Personal details
- Born: Flora Marjorie Fraser; 18 October 1930 Edinburgh, Scotland
- Died: 3 September 2024 (aged 93) Ballater, Scotland
- Party: Crossbench
- Spouse: Alexander Ramsay of Mar (m. 1956; died 2000)
- Children: 3; including Katharine
- Parents: Alexander Fraser, 20th Lord Saltoun (father); Dorothy Geraldine Welby (mother)

Flora Marjorie Fraser, 21st Lady Saltoun (Note: It has recently been determined that Margaret Abernethy succeeded her brother, Alexander Abernethy, 9th Lord Saltoun, in 1668, but only survived him by about 10 weeks and had not previously been counted in the title's numbering. This new information has resulted in the ordinals in subsequent Saltoun lords being revised. As a result, Flora Fraser is sometimes listed as the 20th Lady Saltoun.) (18 October 1930 – 3 September 2024), was a Scottish noblewoman and Crossbench peer. Until her retirement on 12 December 2014, she was the only holder of a lordship of Parliament with a seat in the House of Lords as an elected hereditary peer.

== Early life ==
Flora Marjorie Fraser was born in Edinburgh on 18 October 1930, the daughter of Alexander, Master of Saltoun (later 20th Lord Saltoun), and Dorothy Geraldine Welby (1890–1985). Her maternal grandfather was Sir Charles Welby, 5th Baronet, Conservative MP for Newark. She was raised at Cairnbulg Castle near Fraserburgh, Aberdeenshire, which her father had purchased in 1934 after it had been sold by Frasers in 1613. She was educated at Heathfield School, Ascot, and St Mary's School, Wantage. She had an elder brother, Alexander Simon Fraser, Master of Saltoun (1921–1944), who was their father's heir apparent. He was killed in action in March 1944 while serving with the Grenadier Guards during World War II, making Flora heir presumptive.

== Career ==
In 1979, Flora succeeded her father as 21st Lady Saltoun. She took her seat in the House of Lords as a crossbencher. On 1 May 1984, a decree by the Court of the Lord Lyon, declared that Saltoun was the Chief of the Name and Arms of Clan Fraser and head of the Scottish lowland family, the Frasers of Philorth.

As chief, she was heavily involved in clan activities, seeing herself as its "matriarch". She published a family history in 1997, maintained an extensive clan website and designed tartans. In 1997, she, with Lord Lovat, hosted a four-day Fraser gathering, attended by 30,000 people.

In the Lords, she sat on the ecclesiastical and procedure committees and spoke on policies such as the Common Fisheries Policy and same-sex marriage. She was a proponent of decorum in the house and was opposed to the removal of hereditary peers. For 25 years, she served as secretary of the Association of Scottish Peers.

In 1999, when the House of Lords Act 1999 removed 662 hereditary peers, Saltoun was one of the ninety hereditary peers elected to remain in the Lords. On 12 December 2014, she retired from the Lords under the House of Lords Reform Act 2014.

== Personal life ==
Flora Fraser met Alexander Ramsay of Mar (1919–2000), son of the former Princess Patricia of Connaught, at the Perth Hunt Ball. They became engaged and Queen Elizabeth II gave her official consent to the marriage under the Royal Marriages Act 1772 on 19 August 1956.

They were married on 6 October 1956 at St. Peter's Episcopal Church, Fraserburgh. Queen Elizabeth The Queen Mother and Queen Ingrid of Denmark (her husband's first cousin) attended. As her father's heir, she kept her maiden surname after marriage. The couple had three daughters:

- Katherine Ingrid Mary Isabel Fraser, 22nd Lady Saltoun (born 11 October 1957); married Mark Nicolson on 3 May 1980 and had issue.
- The Hon. Alice Elizabeth Margaret Ramsay of Mar (born 8 July 1961); goddaughter of Princess Alice, Duchess of Gloucester, married David Ramsey on 28 July 1990 and had issue.
- The Hon. Elizabeth Alexandra Mary Ramsay of Mar (born 15 April 1963)

As Ramsay's wife, she was considered a member of the extended British royal family. They frequently attended garden parties at the Palace of Holyroodhouse and other major royal occasions. Her husband was also closely related to the Swedish and Danish royal families, and they attended the weddings of the future Queen Margrethe II in 1967 and King Carl XVI Gustaf in 1976. After being widowed, the last major occasion she attended in Britain was the wedding of Prince William and Catherine Middleton in 2011.

The couple inherited Mar Lodge near Braemar from his aunt, Princess Arthur of Connaught. They also resided at Cairnbulg Castle and Inverey House, a mock baronial house they built near Ballater.

== Death ==
Saltoun died at her home in Inverey (Braemar) on 3 September 2024, at the age of 93. A memorial service was held on 25 November 2024 at St Peter's Episcopal Church, Fraserburgh. The Duke and Duchess of Fife represented the royal family.

== Bibliography ==
- Saltoun, Flora Marjory Fraser, 20th Lady, Clan Fraser: A History Celebrating over 800 Years of the Family in Scotland. Scottish Cultural Press, 1997. ISBN 1840170107

== Footnotes ==
Peerage of Scotland
Preceded by Alexander Fraser	Lady Saltoun; 1979–2024; Member of the House of Lords (1979–1999)	Succeeded by Katharine Fraser
Parliament of the United Kingdom
New office created by the House of Lords Act 1999	Elected hereditary peer to the House of Lords under the House of Lords Act 1999; 1999–2014	Succeeded by The Earl of Kinnoull
