= List of listed buildings in Pitsligo, Aberdeenshire =

This is a list of listed buildings in the parish of Pitsligo in Aberdeenshire, Scotland.

== List ==
Name	Location	Date Listed	Grid Ref. (Note: Sometimes known as OSGB36, the grid reference (where provided) is based on the British national grid reference system used by the Ordnance Survey. • "Guide to National Grid". Ordnance Survey. • "Get-a-map". Ordnance Survey.)	Geo-coordinates	Notes	LB Number (Note: Historic Environment Scotland assign a unique alphanumeric identifier to each designated site in Scotland, for listed buildings this always begins with "LB", for example "LB12345".)	Image
Pittulie, 38 High Street				57°41′55″N 2°04′11″W	Category C(S)	15903	Upload Photo
Pittulie, 44 High Street				57°41′54″N 2°04′08″W	Category C(S)	15907	Upload Photo
Peathill, Burial Ground				57°41′09″N 2°06′46″W	Category B	15913	Upload Photo
Pittulie, 59 High Street And Rear Cottage				57°41′52″N 2°04′05″W	Category C(S)	15881	Upload Photo
Pittulie, 3 High Street				57°41′54″N 2°04′08″W	Category C(S)	15886	Upload Photo
Pittulie, 12 High Street				57°41′55″N 2°04′15″W	Category C(S)	15891	Upload Photo
Pittulie, 13 High Street				57°41′55″N 2°04′15″W	Category C(S)	15892	Upload Photo
Pittulie, 15 High Street				57°41′56″N 2°04′16″W	Category C(S)	15893	Upload Photo
Pittendrum, Mains Of Pittendrum House				57°41′34″N 2°03′41″W	Category A	15914	Upload another image
Pittulie, 62 High Street				57°41′52″N 2°04′02″W	Category C(S)	15884	Upload Photo
Pittulie, 25 High Street				57°41′57″N 2°04′17″W	Category C(S)	15897	Upload Photo
Pittulie, 41 High Street				57°41′54″N 2°04′09″W	Category C(S)	15905	Upload Photo
Pittulie, 55, 56 High Street				57°41′52″N 2°04′01″W	Category C(S)	15878	Upload Photo
Pittulie, 60 High Street				57°41′52″N 2°04′03″W	Category C(S)	15882	Upload Photo
Sandhaven, Main Street, Sandhaven Mill				57°41′42″N 2°03′28″W	Category B	15885	Upload Photo
Pittulie, 20 High Street				57°41′57″N 2°04′19″W	Category C(S)	15894	Upload Photo
Pittulie, 27 High Street				57°41′56″N 2°04′16″W	Category C(S)	15898	Upload Photo
Pittulie, 29 High Street, House And Store				57°41′56″N 2°04′15″W	Category C(S)	15899	Upload Photo
Pittulie, 40 High Street				57°41′55″N 2°04′10″W	Category C(S)	15904	Upload Photo
Peathill, Glebe House (Former Church Of Scotland Manse), Walled Garden And Steading				57°41′06″N 2°06′43″W	Category B	15910	Upload Photo
Pittulie Castle				57°41′35″N 2°05′37″W	Category A	15915	Upload another image
Pittulie, 49 High Street				57°41′54″N 2°04′05″W	Category C(S)	15873	Upload Photo
Pittulie, 61 High Street				57°41′52″N 2°04′03″W	Category C(S)	15883	Upload Photo
Pittulie, 8 High Street				57°41′54″N 2°04′13″W	Category C(S)	15890	Upload Photo
Pittulie, 21 High Street				57°41′56″N 2°04′16″W	Category C(S)	15895	Upload Photo
Braco Park, Dovecot				57°41′17″N 2°07′52″W	Category C(S)	15908	Upload Photo
Mounthooley Dovecot				57°41′00″N 2°07′41″W	Category A	15909	Upload another image
Pittulie, 58 High Street				57°41′53″N 2°04′04″W	Category C(S)	15880	Upload Photo
Pittulie, 6 High Street				57°41′54″N 2°04′12″W	Category C(S)	15888	Upload Photo
Pittulie, 7 High Street				57°41′54″N 2°04′12″W	Category C(S)	15889	Upload Photo
Pitsligo Castle				57°41′32″N 2°06′24″W	Category A	13884	Upload another image
Pittulie, 24 High Street				57°41′57″N 2°04′17″W	Category C(S)	15896	Upload Photo
Pittulie, 35 High Street				57°41′55″N 2°04′12″W	Category C(S)	15901	Upload Photo
Pittulie, 43 High Street				57°41′57″N 2°04′17″W	Category C(S)	15906	Upload Photo
Peathill, Hill Kirk (Pitsligo Parish Church Of Scotland)				57°41′11″N 2°06′42″W	Category A	15911	Upload another image
Pittulie, 2 High Street				57°41′54″N 2°04′07″W	Category C(S)	15917	Upload Photo
Pittulie, 50 High Street				57°41′54″N 2°04′05″W	Category C(S)	15874	Upload Photo
Pittulie, 53 High Street				57°41′53″N 2°04′04″W	Category C(S)	15876	Upload Photo
Pittulie, 34 High Street				57°41′55″N 2°04′12″W	Category C(S)	15900	Upload Photo
Pittulie, 1 High Street				57°41′54″N 2°04′06″W	Category C(S)	15916	Upload Photo
Pittulie, 47 High Street				57°41′54″N 2°04′06″W	Category C(S)	15872	Upload Photo
Pittulie, 52 High Street				57°41′54″N 2°04′04″W	Category C(S)	15875	Upload Photo
Pittulie, 54 High Street				57°41′53″N 2°04′03″W	Category B	15877	Upload Photo
Pittulie, 37 High Street				57°41′55″N 2°04′11″W	Category C(S)	15902	Upload Photo
Pittulie, 57 High Street				57°41′52″N 2°04′01″W	Category C(S)	15879	Upload Photo
Pittulie, 5 High Street				57°41′54″N 2°04′10″W	Category C(S)	15887	Upload Photo

== Key ==
The scheme for classifying buildings in Scotland is:

- Category A: "buildings of national or international importance, either architectural or historic; or fine, little-altered examples of some particular period, style or building type."
- Category B: "buildings of regional or more than local importance; or major examples of some particular period, style or building type, which may have been altered."
- Category C: "buildings of local importance; lesser examples of any period, style, or building type, as originally constructed or moderately altered; and simple traditional buildings which group well with other listed buildings."

In March 2016 there were 47,288 listed buildings in Scotland. Of these, 8% were Category A, and 50% were Category B, with the remaining 42% being Category C.

== See also ==
- List of listed buildings in Aberdeenshire
