= John Munro of Tain =

John Munro (died c. 1630) was a Presbyterian minister of Tain, in the Scottish Highlands. As a Presbyterian, he resisted the efforts of King James VI of Scotland (later James I of England) to unite the Presbyterian Church of Scotland with the Episcopalian Church of England. As a result he was persecuted for many years.

== Family ==
He was the third son of Hugh Munro, 1st of Assynt, and grandson of Robert Munro, 14th Baron of Foulis. His mother was Christina, a daughter of Robert Munro of Carbisdale. John Munro married Euphemia, a daughter of Andrew Munro, 5th of Milntown, a cousin of her husband. They had no children. A brother of John was Robert Munro, minister of Creich from 1609 to around 1640.

== Early years ==
He was educated for the ministry at St Andrews University, graduating as MA in 1590. He was granted the Chaplainry of Newmore to help pay or his university studies, in accordance with the plans of the reformer John Knox. In 1591 he was a member of the General Assembly of the Church of Scotland. Subsequently he was presented to parish of Tain in 1599, and the charge of St Duthus Church in the burgh. Among the emoluments of this parish were the chaplainries of Newmore, Tarlogie, Cambuscurry, Morangie and Dunskaith. He was also appointed a Sub-Dean of the Diocese of Ross.

== Resistance to the union of Churches, 1605-07 ==
In 1605, King James attempted to unite the Presbyterian Church of Scotland with the Episcopal Church of England. In order to prevent the General Assembly of the Presbyterian Church blocking this, he placed it under an interdict to prevent it from meeting. The Parish of Tain was one of the Presbyteries which opposed the proposed union, and in defiance of James' interdict, they sent John Munro as representative to an Assembly at Aberdeen on 2 July 1605; on that occasion he was nominated as Moderator.

King James had declared the Aberdeen Assembly seditious, so it did little more than convene then disperse, though the fact it had met at all was in defiance of the King. The 19 ministers who had attended the Assembly were summoned before the Scottish Privy Council. Ten of these submitted to the King, while the other seven, John Munro among them, maintained that the Assembly had been a lawful one. These seven dissenting ministers who appeared were banished throughout Scotland, each as far as possible from their own parish. One of them, John Welsh of Ayr, the son-in-law of John Knox, was banished to France. John Munro was to be sent to Kintyre, but in the meantime was imprisoned in Doune Castle, Perthshire, with another of the ministers, Charles Ferm. With the aid of the Constable of the castle, who was subsequently imprisoned for his actions, John escaped.

In 1607 he and 13 others were again summoned before the Privy Council, appearing on 20 May of that year. However, while waiting on the judgement of the Council they went into hiding in Edinburgh, and quietly left the city before they could be arrested. As a result they were declared rebels. In the meantime, King James had been successful in suppressing all but a small number of the dissenters to his plan. However, his success was later undone when the Puritans under Oliver Cromwell came to power in 1649.

== Later years ==
Following his flight from Edinburgh in 1607, Munro made his way to Tain and resumed his ministry among the people there, though without the stipend previously paid by the Crown. He continued to live and minister to the people there for many years after.

On 24 May 1610, the Scottish Privy Council sent a letter to the Provost and Bailies of Tain, admonishing them for permitting the Munro to remain living among them and to continue preaching unmolested. What action was taken is not known, but Munro was still in Tain twenty years later in 1630, though he died shortly afterwards.
