= Coull Castle =

Castle in Scotland

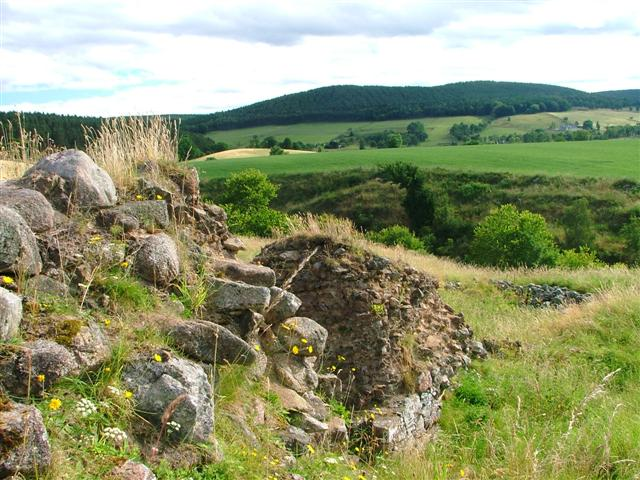

Site information
- Condition: Ruined

Location
- Coordinates: 57.1087°N 2.8063°W

Site history
- Built: 13th century

Coull Castle was a 13th-century castle to the south of Coull, Aberdeenshire, Scotland.

== History ==
The castle occupies an important and commanding position along the northern approach to Aboyne. It was built by the Durwards in the 13th century and was the main stronghold of the barony of O’Neill. The last mention of the intact castle was in a charter dated 17 February 1554 from the Queen Regent, Mary I, which grants "the lands of Cowle with their castle and mill, in the sheriffdom of Aberdeen." The castle was ruined by the first half of the 17th century according to the collections of Sir James Balfour.

The castle ruins were excavated by the landowner Dr Marshall Mackenzie after his purchase of the land in 1912 and the excavations were later continued by W. Douglas Simpson in 1922. The castle consisted of a pentagonal courtyard with at least three flanking towers. Slight traces of the castle are visible above ground.
