= Pitsligo Castle =

Castle in Aberdeenshire, Scotland

Pitsligo castle
- Aberdeenshire, Scotland
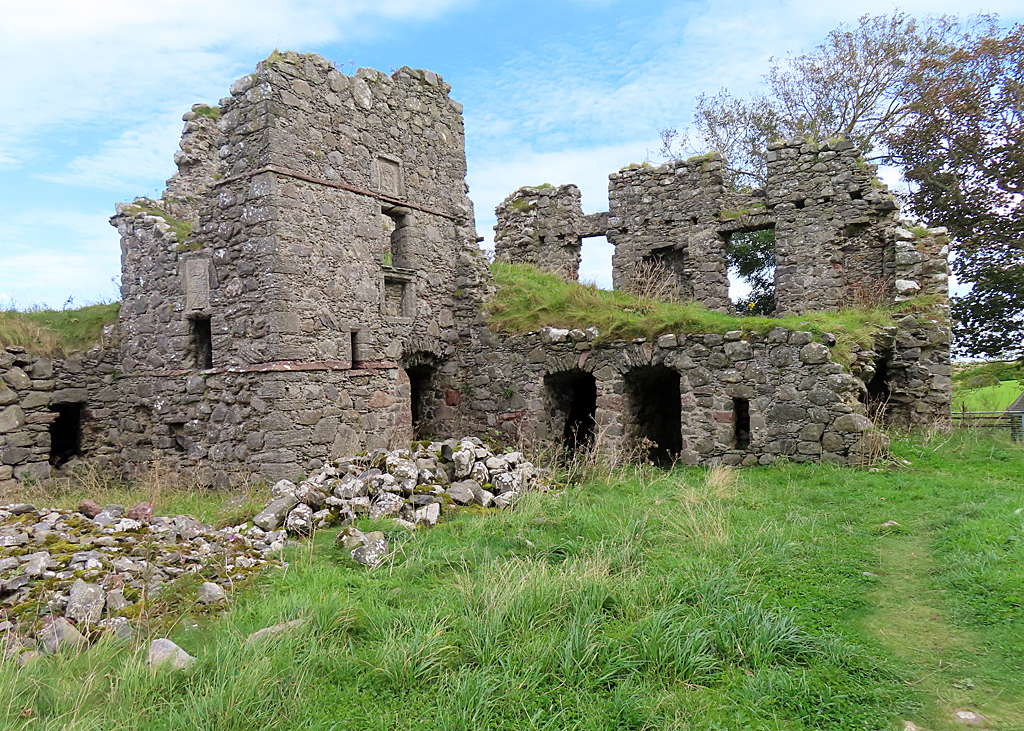
- Pitsligo Castle in 2024

Site information
- Condition: Ruin

Location
- Coordinates: 57°41′32″N 2°06′25″W

Site history
- Built: 15th century

Scheduled monument
- Official name: Pitsligo Castle
- Type: Secular: castle; garden; palace; tower; well
- Designated: 24 January 1995
- Reference no.: SM6146

Pitsligo Castle is a ruined castle half a mile east of Rosehearty, Aberdeenshire, Scotland. Modified in the 1570s by the Forbes of Druminnor, it was described by W. Douglas Simpson as one of the nine castles of the Knuckle, referring to the rocky headland of North-East Aberdeenshire. It is listed by Historic Environment Scotland as a scheduled monument.

== History ==
It originated as a keep, dating to 1424. There is an arched gateway in the west wall of the outer court, with the date 1656 and the arms of the Forbeses and Erskines. In the inner court, the date is shown as 1663. At the north-east angle of the courtyard, there is a tall flanking drum tower, with walls 9 feet (2.7 m) thick, built by the Frasers of Philorth. The main tower had three vaulted storeys, but almost all above the lowest has disappeared. There is a stair tower at the north-east corner which is better preserved. There are several armorial plaques dotted around the castle, including the Pitsligo Arms of 1665 and, over the courtyard doorway, the Royal Arms dated 1577 and 1603.

The castle was looted and destroyed by the Flemish troops of William Lascelles in 1845. Its roof was removed by the Gardens of Troup thereafter.

As of Charles McKean's visit around 1990, "a fine walled garden" was to the north and a walled enclosure to the west. Around the same time, the castle was consolidated by Douglas Forrest architects, for Malcolm Forbes.

== See also ==
- List of castles in Scotland
- Scheduled monuments in Aberdeenshire
