= Battle of Alltan-Beath =

16th-century Scottish clan battle

Coordinates: 58.031°N 4.116°W

- Part of the Scottish clan wars
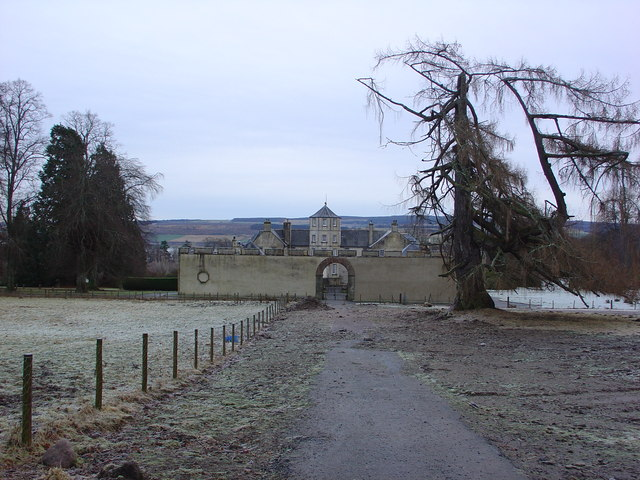
- Foulis Castle where Donald Mackay was imprisoned after the Battle of Alltan-Beath
Date	1542
Location	Knockartel, Scotland
Result	Clan Sutherland victory

Belligerents
Clan Sutherland (Supporters of John Gordon, 11th Earl of Sutherland)	Clan Mackay

Commanders and leaders
Hutcheon Murray of Aberscross; Gilbert Gordon of Garty	Donald Mackay, 11th of Strathnaver

Strength
Unknown	"A company of men"

Casualties and losses
William Sutherland (KIA)	John MacIan-MacAngus (KIA)

The Battle of Alltan-Beath, also known as the Battle of Ailtan-Beath, was a Scottish clan battle said to have taken place in 1542 in the village of Knockarthur (or Knockartel), in Sutherland, in the Scottish Highlands. It was fought between men of the Clan Mackay and men of the Clan Sutherland whose chiefs were the Gordon, Earls of Sutherland.

== Background ==
=== Sir Robert Gordon's account ===
17th-century historian, Sir Robert Gordon, who himself was a son of Alexander Gordon, 12th Earl of Sutherland, wrote an account of the background events leading up to the battle: Gordon states that there was peace between the Mackays and Sutherlands from the death of John Mackay in 1529 until the year 1542 when chief "Donald Mackay came with a company of men to the village of Knockartel, burnt the same, and took a prey of goods from Strathbrory". He goes on to say that the goods were soon recovered and that soon afterwards Donald Mackay again invaded Sutherland and marched as far as Skibo Castle and encamped there.

=== Angus Mackay's account ===
Historian Angus Mackay disputes the version of background events given by Sir Robert Gordon. Angus Mackay states that Robert Stuart, Bishop of Caithness, having departed for England to join his brother the Earl of Lennox, made some arrangements with his relatives, the Earl of Caithness and Donald Mackay, for the protection of his castles and church-lands. As such the Earl of Caithness occupied Scrabster Castle which was near Thurso and Donald Mackay, having advanced into Sutherland, placed a party of his clansmen in Skibo Castle, under the command of Neil Mackay of the Mackay of Aberach branch of the Clan Mackay.

== Battle ==
Neither the Mackay historians nor the 1813 publication of Sir Robert Gordon's History of the Earldom of Sutherland mention an actual battle. However, an account of the Battle of Alltan-Beath was written in the book Conflicts of the Clans which was published by the Foulis Press in 1764 and which was based on Gordon's original 17th century manuscript.

Donald Mackay of Strathnaver, having succeeded his brother, John, taketh the occasion upon the death of Adam, Earl of Sutherland (who left his grandchild, John, young to succeed him) to molest and invade the inhabitants of Sutherland. He came, the year of God 1542, with a company of men to the village of Knockartoll, burnt the same, and took a great prey of goods out of Strathbrora. Sir Hugh Kennedy of Griffen Mains dwelt then in Sutherland, having married John, Earl of Sutherland's mother, after the death of his father, Alexander, Master of Sutherland. Sir Hugh Kennedy being advertised of Mackay's coming into Sutherland, he advises with Hutcheon Murray of Abirscors, and with Gilbert Gordon of Garty, what was best to be done. They resolve to fight the enemy; and so having gathered a company of men, they overtook Mackay, unawares, beside a place called Ailtan-Beath, where they invaded him suddenly; having passed his spies unseen. After a little skirmish the Strathnaver men fled, the booty was rescued, and John MacIan-MacAngus, one of their chieftains, was slain, with divers of the Strathnaver men. Donald Mackay, nevertheless, played the part of a good soldier; for in his flight he killed, with his own hand, one William Sutherland, who most eagerly pursued him in the chase. The inhabitants of Sutherland and Strathnaver (in regard of Earl John's minority) did thus continually vex one another, until this Donald Mackay was apprehended and imprisoned in the Castle of Fowlis, in Ross, by commandment of the Queen Regent and the Governor, where he continued a good while in captivity.

== Aftermath ==
=== Sir Robert Gordon's account ===
Sir Robert Gordon, son of the Earl of Sutherland goes onto say that in that year: The Gordon Earl of Huntly and Gordon Earl of Sutherland both coming north into Sutherland, they did summon Sinclair, Earl of Caithness and Donald Mackay to compear before them at Helmsdale, to answer for their intromission with the bishop's rents, and for the wrongs which they had done, and caused to be done upon the bishop's lands. The Earl of Caithness compeared at the time and place appointed, and yielded himself to their mercy. So, having made a final agreement with them at Helmsdale, he returned again into Caithness. Donald Mackay was also at this time brought to the Earls of Huntly and Sutherland, who (upon Mackay's submission) pardoned him what was past; yet he was at their command imprisoned in the castle of Foulis.

=== Angus Mackay's account ===
This version of events is however disputed by historian Angus Mackay who says that Sir Robert Gordon described it with his "usual untruthfulness". Mackay also quotes historian Sir William Fraser who shows that at the time the Earl of Cathness was sitting hospitably entertaining friends in Castle Sinclair Girnigoe when by contrast Sir Robert Gordon describes him as having been "sprawling in the river of Helmsdale with the terror of the Gordons upon him". Angus Mackay also disputes the account that Donald Mackay of Strathnaver was even taken prisoner.

== Mackay's escape from Foulis Castle ==
17th-century historian Sir Robert Gordon writes of Mackay's imprisonment at Foulis: "where he continued a good while in captivity; from whence he escaped by means of Donald MacK-ean-voyr, (Mackay) a Strathnaver man, who advised him to flee away".

19th-century historian Alexander Mackenzie wrote in his book the History of the Munros of Fowlis (1898):

In this year 1542, a feud broke out between Donald Mackay, Chief of the Clan Mackay, and John Gordon, 15th Earl of Sutherland, during which Mackay committed several depredations. He was ultimately apprehended, and by order of the Gordon Earl of Huntly, Lieutenant of the North, was imprisoned in Fowlis Castle, where he was kept for a considerable time in captivity. He however managed to make his escape through the connivance of one Donald Mackay, a Strathnaver man; and it seems highly probable that Baron Robert Munro of Fowlis was cognisant of the plan adopted to effect the liberation of his prisoner, as the Mackays and Munros were for generations on very friendly terms.
