= Robert Munro, 14th Baron of Foulis =

Scottish clan chief (d. 1547)

Robert Munro, 14th Baron of Foulis (died 10 September 1547) was a Scottish soldier and clan chief of the Highland Clan Munro. He was seated at Foulis Castle. Although he is traditionally the 14th Baron and 17th overall chief of the clan, he is only the 7th Munro chief that can be proved by contemporary evidence.

== Lands and Charters ==
On 22 May 1542 Robert was served heir to his father Hector Munro, 13th Baron of Foulis before John Cuthbert, Sheriff of Inverness and thus inherited his father's lands. Also during 1542, James V of Scotland granted Robert the relief of the lands that had belonged to his father.

In 1542, a feud broke out between Donald Mackay, 11th of Strathnaver, chief of the Clan Mackay and John Gordon, 11th Earl of Sutherland, the chief of Clan Sutherland. The feud resulted in the Battle of Alltan-Beath after which Donald Mackay was captured and imprisoned in the Munro's Foulis Castle. Some accounts say that he escaped, others that he was released by Robert Munro as the Munros and Mackays had been on good terms for generations. According to Fraser's Wardlaw Manuscript written in the 17th century, because of the Munro's kindness and civility towards Donald Mackay "to this day" a correspondence was linked between the Munros and Mackays.

In 1544, Robert Munro, 14th Baron of Foulis signed a bond of kindness and alliance with Alexander Ross, the chief of the Clan Ross of Balnagown Castle. In 1546 Robert Munro, Laird of Foulis received the patronage of the Chaplainory of Obsdale from Angus MacDonald, 7th chief of the Clan MacDonell of Glengarry.

== Battle of Pinkie Cleugh ==
In early September, 1547, Englishman Edward Seymour, 1st Duke of Somerset invaded Scotland. All of the Scottish clan chiefs and noblemen were called to Edinburgh. Robert Munro, 14th Baron of Foulis responded to the call and together with the fighting men of his clan he proceeded to Edinburgh and joined the Scottish army. On 10 September the Battle of Pinkie Cleugh took place where Robert was killed.

== Family and descendants ==
Robert married Margaret Dunbar, only daughter of Sir Alexander Dunbar, Sheriff of Morayshire. They had seven children who produced many of the important branches of the Clan Munro.

1. Robert Mor Munro, 15th Baron of Foulis. (heir and successor).
2. Hector Munro, 1st of Contullich, Gildermorie and Fyrish. From who descend the Monro of Fyrish branch who were a distinguished family of physicians.
3. Hugh Munro 1st, of Assynt, whose third son was Reverend John Munro of Tain.
4. George Munro, 1st of Katewell. According to historian Alexander Mackenzie this George Munro was killed alongside his father in battle in 1547. However, the evidence is against this because the same historian quotes a charter granted to Robert Mor Munro, 15th Baron in 1563 which was witnessed by his brother George, proving that George was still alive years after the battle. James Monroe, fifth president of the United States was descended from the Munro of Katewell branch of the clan.
5. Catherine Munro.
6. Janet Munro.
