= Alexander Fraser, 20th Lord Saltoun =

Scottish peer

The Right Honourable The Lord Saltoun MC, JP, DL

Member of the House of Lords
- Lord Temporal
- as a representative peer 1935–1963
- Preceded by: 19th Lord Saltoun
- Succeeded by: 21st Lady Saltoun

Personal details
- Born: 8 March 1886
- Died: 31 August 1979 (aged 93) Twickenham, England
- Spouse: Dorothy Geraldine Welby
- Children: 2; including Flora Fraser, 21st Lady Saltoun
- Parents: Alexander Fraser, 19th Lord Saltoun (father); Mary Helena Grattan-Bellew (mother)
- Education: Eton College; New College, Oxford

Alexander Arthur Fraser, 20th Lord Saltoun, MC, JP, DL (8 March 1886 – 31 August 1979), styled Master of Saltoun until 1933, was a Scottish peer who was one of the longest-serving representative peers, serving in the House of Lords from 1935 to 1963. With the granting of seats in the House of Lords to all Scottish peers, which took effect in August 1963 (after the Peerage Act 1963), Lord Saltoun remained as a Hereditary Peer.

== Biography ==
He was the eldest son of Alexander Fraser, 19th Lord Saltoun, and Mary Helena Grattan-Bellew, sister of Sir Henry Christopher Grattan-Bellew, 3rd Baronet.

He was educated at Eton College and New College, Oxford. He was commissioned as a 2nd Lieutenant in the Forfar and Kincardine Royal Garrison Artillery (Militia) in 1905. After it was disbanded he transferred to a Special Reserve battalion of the Gordon Highlanders and served as a Captain and Honorary Major in that regiment during World War I, when he was taken prisoner of war.

On 8 June 1920, he married Dorothy Geraldine Welby and they had two children:

- Alexander Simon Fraser, Master of Saltoun (1921–1944), killed in action in the Second World War
- Flora Marjory Fraser, 21st Lady Saltoun (18 October 1930 – 3 September 2024)

He died at Cross Deep, his home in Twickenham, aged 93.

Masonic offices
Preceded by The Lord Belhaven and Stenton	Grand Master of the Grand Lodge of Scotland; 1933–1935	Succeeded by Sir Iain Colquhoun
Peerage of Scotland
Preceded by Alexander Fraser	Lord Saltoun; 1933–1979	Succeeded by Flora Fraser
