= Fraserburgh University =

Shortlived university in Scotland

University of Fraserburgh
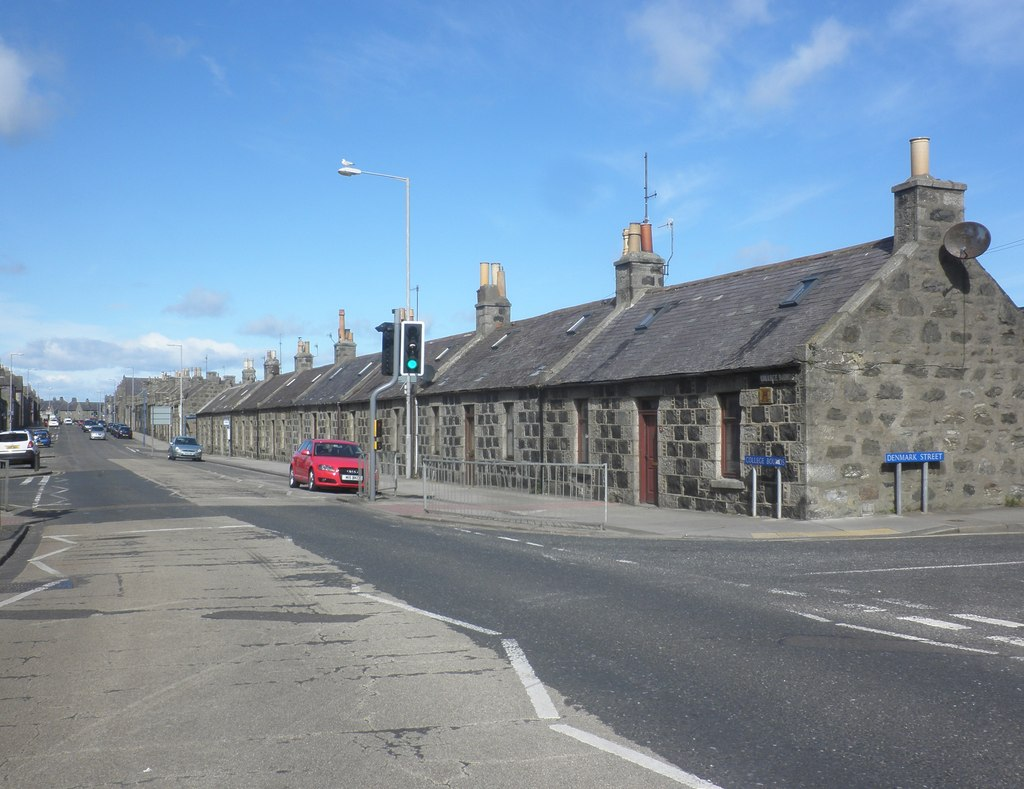
- College Bounds, a possible site of the university.
- Type: Ancient University
- Active: 1592–1617
- Founder: Sir Alexander Fraser
- Religious affiliation: Church of Scotland
- Location: Fraserburgh, Aberdeenshire, Scotland
- Campus: University town

The University of Fraserburgh was a short-lived university founded in 1592 in Fraserburgh, Scotland by Sir Alexander Fraser of Philorth. Despite ambitious plans and parliamentary support, the university ultimately failed to develop fully and closed in 1617, following the death of Charles Ferme, its first and only principal.

== History ==
=== Background ===
In 1588, Sir Alexander Fraser had obtained a charter to have Faithlie, as it was then known, be established as a burgh of barony. Four years later it was renamed Fraserburgh, and became a Burgh of royalty, despite protests from Aberdeen over what they viewed as an infringement on their rights.

=== Establishment ===
In 1592, Fraser was granted a charter to establish a university or college there, with the general assembly of the town quickly supporting it, offering the patronage of two of the town's churches (Tyrie and Rathen). King James conferred onto it all the privileges that other universities were usually granted. It is possible that Earl Marischal's personal rivalry with Fraser resulted in him founding Marischal College in Aberdeen. The university was confirmed on 16 December 1597 by parliament, who agreed to reimburse the costs of establishing it, since Fraser had expended much of his fortune on the scheme. The general assembly of Fraserburgh granted land to Fraser for the university.

Charles Ferme, an alumnus of the University of Edinburgh who had previously been made Minister of Philorth in 1598 (as Fraser had insisted that whoever took the charge as minister would also have to be the principal), was made the principal of the university in 1600, which was at this point a "spacious quadrangular building", three stories in height, located to the west of the town. However, after Ferme was sent to prison for taking part in the disastrous General Assembly of Aberdeen in 1605, the university, now without a principal, fell into abeyance that same year. There is no record of what teaching took place during this period; however, it has been assumed the teaching was similar to that at Marischal College.

=== Later history ===
In 1609, Ferme was restored to his parish and college, where he continued to teach until his death in 1617. The writings by Ferme (such as the lost Lectiones in Esterem and the surviving Analysis logica in epistolam apostoli Pauli ad Romanos) indicate that teaching did take place, with John Adamson noting "with what zeal he taught at Fraserburgh". After the death of Ferme, the college fell into decay, having lost out to Marischal College, and consequently closed for good.

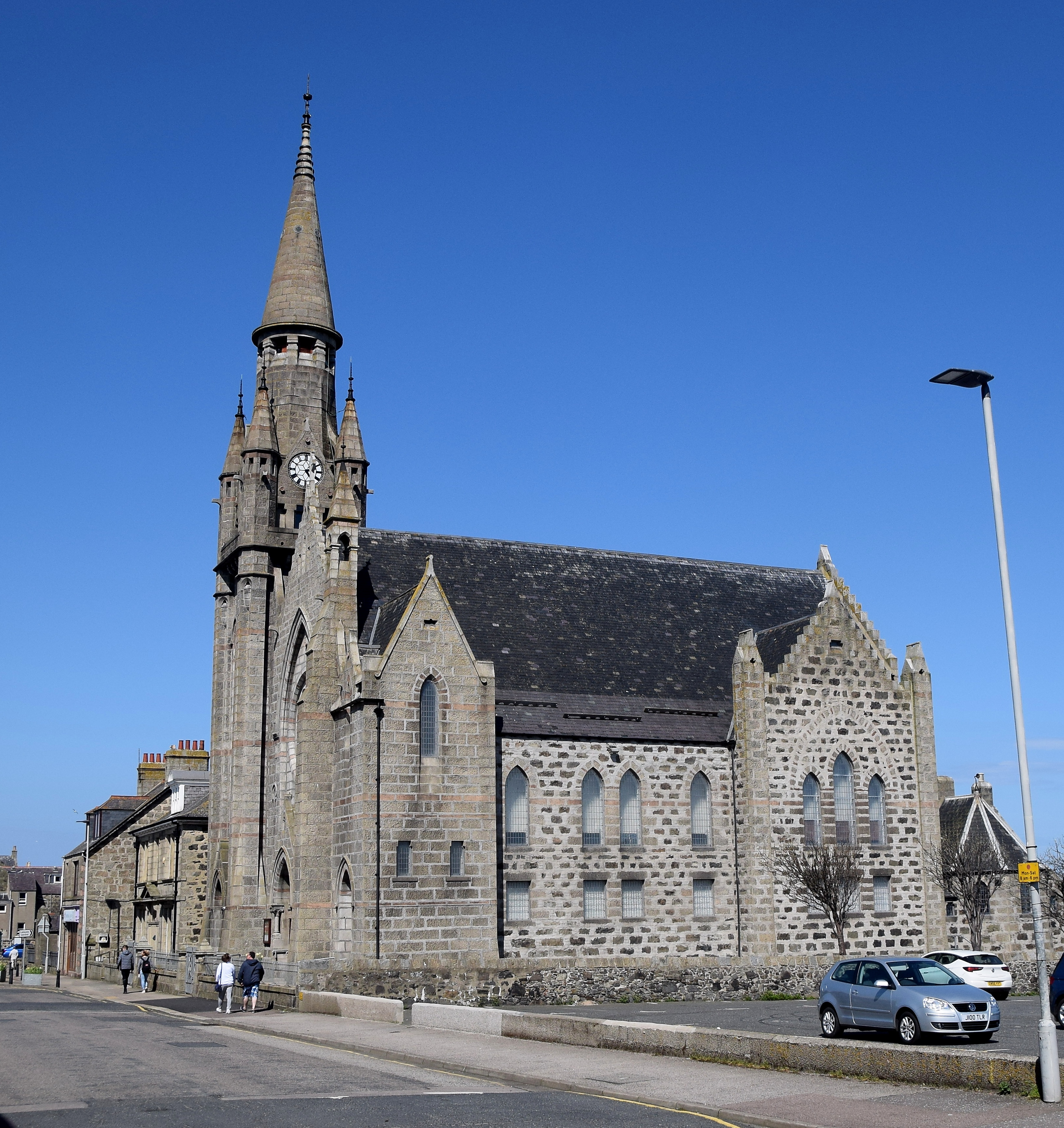
Fraserburgh South Kirk, site of Moses Tablet

During the 1647 plague breakout in Aberdeen, King's College was temporarily moved to the old college buildings.

The college buildings had been mostly demolished by the early 18th century, with the tower being demolished as early as the late 17th century. A house to the west of the town was said to have been built with materials taken from the college, with four of the stones bearing inscriptions. In the mid 19th century, Reverend A. Gruar Forbes described the remains of the college:

The old tower can scarcely be said to be still extant. It has been reduced to a heap, and is almost covered with soil and herbage. Last time I saw it there was a couple of goats feeding on the top of it.

The 1869 and 1874 Ordnance Survey maps of Fraserburgh note the "Site of College" on the west end of the town, which later became known as College Bounds. The only surviving part of the college is the Moses Tablet (also known as the Moses Stone), which was previously set in the wall above the door of the parish school when it was built in 1787, and is now built into the interior wall of the vestry in the Fraserburgh South Parish Church, having been relocated inside the building in October 1969, a move funded by the town council.

== Legacy ==
In the Fraserburgh South Parish Church, there is a plaque commemorating the university's existence (alongside the Moses Tablet). Due to a lack of archaeological excavations, the precise location and nature of the college buildings remains unknown.

== Notable people ==
=== Staff ===
- Charles Ferme

=== Students ===
- William Rires

== See also ==
- Ancient Universities of Scotland
- Medieval university
- List of early modern universities in Europe
- Marischal College
