= Fraser of Muchalls =

Branch of the Fraser clan in Scotland

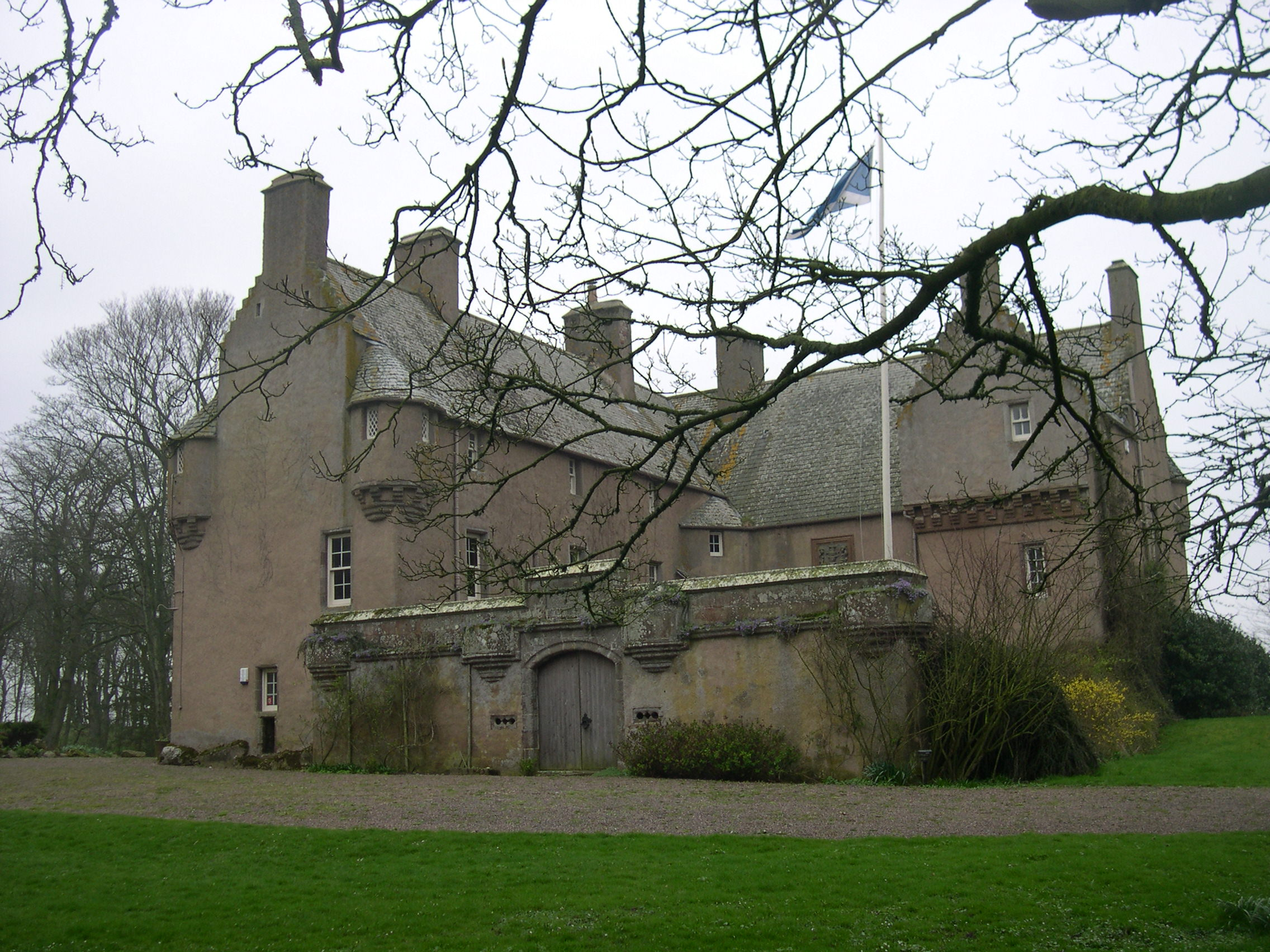
Muchalls Castle

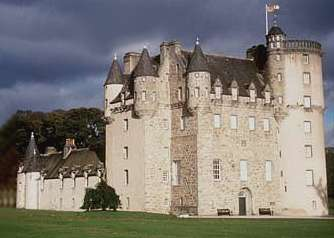
Castle Fraser

The Frasers of Muchal-in Mar, sometimes referred to as the Frasers of Muchalls, were a branch of the Fraser family in Scotland.

In 1366 Thomas Fraser, a descendant of Sir Alexander Fraser of Cornton brother of Sir Richard Fraser of Touch-Fraser, exchanged the lands in Petyndreich, Stirlingshire for those of Kinmundy, Aberdeenshire. His grandson Thomas exchanged the estate of Cornton for Stonywood and Muchalls in Aberdeenshire. It was presumably Thomas who erected the towerhouse stronghold overlooking the North Sea, which is now known as Muchalls Castle, having undergone expansion by the Burnetts of Leys in 1617. His descendant, Andrew Fraser, who was created Lord Fraser in 1633, completed Castle Fraser in 1636. The title became dormant following the premature death in 1716 of Charles, 4th Lord Fraser, a Jacobite who, while trying to escape from Government troops, fell over the cliffs at Pennan, near Peterhead. Castle Fraser, near Inverurie, Aberdeenshire, has been under the care of the National Trust for Scotland since 1976.

== See also ==
- Clan Fraser
