= William Fraser, 12th Lord Saltoun =

Scottish peer

William Fraser, 12th Lord Saltoun (21 November 1654 – 18 March 1715), was a Scottish peer and the 11th Laird of Philorth.

== Early years ==
Fraser was born on 11 November 1654 in the small town of Fraserburgh. His parents were Alexander Fraser, Master of Saltoun (c.1630-1682) and Lady Ann Kerr (1631–1658). When his grandfather, Alexander Fraser, 11th Lord Saltoun died on 11 August 1693, he became 12th Lord Saltoun of Abernethy and inherited the lands of Philorth as 11th Laird.

== Political life ==
On the death of his grandfather in 1693, he also inherited a seat in the old Scottish Parliament. He formally took the seat in 1695, taking the Oath on 9 May of that year. He was key member of the 'Patriot Parliament'. One of the first major causes he fought was for the Scots rights to Darien in the 1700/01 Parliament. More significantly, he consistently voted against the Anglo-Scottish Union from 1705 to 1707. When the Alien Act was passed in England in 1705, Fraser voted against the Act for Union in the Scottish Parliament. His political colours were shown when on 15 November 1706 he supported the Earl Marischal's protest against any future link with England. The protest emphasised the view that with the death of an heirless Queen Anne, "no person can be designed a successor to the Crown of this realm". This was in direct contradiction with the first article of Union, and threatened to end the Regal Union of 1603 which would have severed all ties between the Kingdoms of Scotland and England. He ultimately voted against the final ratification of the Treaty in the Scottish Parliament on 16 January 1707. It has also been written that he was critical of the leadership of the Duke of Hamilton who led the opposition against the Acts of Union. In correspondence to his ally the Earl of Erroll, Fraser told of his belief that Hamilton was on the pay of the English Crown and doubted his real intentions. Given Hamilton's weak leadership and the benefits he reaped from the Union, historians take real note of Fraser's observation when his contemporaries did not.

Given his political patriotism, there is little wonder that Fraser was initially arrested with the outbreak of the Jacobite rebellion in 1708. The warrant for his arrest was quickly dropped as he was gravely ill during the rebellion. There is little doubt that Fraser was a Jacobite sympathiser, not unlike the majority of his neighbouring Buchan Lords. The Fraser family were Episcopalian, and as such more inclined towards Jacobitism. In 1702 he supported the Episcopalians of Fraserburgh when the Presbyterian's attempted to take the High Church. Indeed, Fraser's wife was Margaret Sharp - was daughter of Dr. James Sharp, the Episcopal Archbishop of St. Andrews. Fraser's intentions are, however, ultimately unknown as he died before the rebellion of 1715. His wife was, after 1715, a known Jacobite sympathiser. Also his daughter, Henrietta Fraser (c.1698-1751) married John Gordon of Kinellar (1684–1764) - a Jacobite who entered Aberdeen with Earl Marischal to proclaim James Francis Edward Stuart as King James VIII. Fraser's son and successor, the 13th Lord Saltoun, did not come out for the Jacobites in 1715.

== Family, succession, death ==
Fraser married Margaret Sharp 11 October 1683. She was the daughter of James Sharp, the Archbishop of St Andrews who was murdered by Scottish Covenanters on Magnus Muir in 1679. She survived Fraser, dying in 1734. They had seven children,

- Alexander Fraser, 13th Lord Saltoun, married Lady Mary, daughter of George Gordon, 1st Earl of Aberdeen and Anne Lockhart.
- William Fraser, of Fraserfield (1691–1727), married Anne Erskine, daughter of the David Erskine, 9th Earl of Buchan.
- James Fraser of Lonmay (d.10 Aug 1729), married Lady Eleanor, daughter of Colin Lindsay, 3rd Earl of Balcarres and Lady Margaret daughter of James Campbell, 2nd Earl of Loudoun. No issue.
- Helen Fraser, married James Gordon of Park.
- Henrietta Fraser (1698–1751), married John Gordon of Kinellar (1684–1764), son of Sir James Gordon of Lesmoir.
- Mary Fraser, married William Dalmahoy of Rovelrig.
- Isabella Fraser (d.1772), married Rev. David Brown, minister at Belhavie.

In 1682 Fraser became Master of Saltoun upon the death of his Father. He became 12th Lord Saltoun of Abernethy upon the death of his grandfather in 1693.

William Fraser, the 12th Lord Saltoun, died on 18 March 1715 in his 61st year.

Peerage of Scotland
Preceded by Alexander Fraser	Lord Saltoun; 1693–1715	Succeeded by Alexander Fraser
