= Alexander Fraser, 19th Lord Saltoun =

Scottish peer

The Right Honourable The Lord Saltoun CMG

Member of the House of Lords

Grand Master of the Grand Lodge of Scotland
- In office 1897–1900
- Preceded by: Sir Charles Dalrymple, 1st Baronet
- Succeeded by: James Hozier, 2nd Baron Newlands

Personal details
- Born: 8 August 1851
- Died: 19 June 1933 (aged 81)
- Spouse: Mary Helena Grattan-Bellew
- Children: 5 (including Alexander and William)
- Parent: Alexander Fraser, 18th Lord Saltoun (father)

Alexander William Frederick Fraser, 19th Lord Saltoun CMG (8 August 1851 – 19 June 1933) was a Scottish representative peer, military officer, and freemason.

== Biography ==
He was born on 8 August 1851 as the son of Alexander Fraser, 18th Lord Saltoun.

Lord Saltoun served in the House of Lords as a Scottish representative peer, He was a Freemason and the Grand Master of the Grand Lodge of Scotland from 1897 to 1900.

On 7 July 1885, he married Mary Helena Grattan-Bellew and they had five children:

- Alexander Arthur Fraser, 20th Lord Saltoun (1886–1979)
- Rear-Admiral Hon. George Fraser, RN (born 1887)
- Lieutenant Hon. Simon Fraser, Gordon Highlanders (born 1888, killed in action 29 October 1914).
- Brigadier Hon. William Fraser (1890–1964)
- Hon. Mary Alexandra Fraser (born 1891), married:

(1) Lieutenant-Commander John Codrington (died November 1918)
(2) Major Arthur Ramsay

Lord Saltoun died on 19 June 1933.

Masonic offices
Preceded by Charles Dalrymple	Grand Master of the Grand Lodge of Scotland; 1897–1900	Succeeded by Hon. James Hozier
Peerage of Scotland
Preceded by Alexander Fraser	Lord Saltoun; 1886–1933	Succeeded by Alexander Fraser
