= Alexander Fraser, 11th Lord Saltoun =

British lord (1604–1693)

Alexander Fraser, 11th Lord Saltoun (March 4, 1604 – August 11, 1693), was a Scottish peer and the 10th Laird of Philorth.

== Life ==
Fraser was born in 1604 in the young town of Fraserburgh in Aberdeenshire, Scotland. His father was Sir Alexander Fraser (1570–1636), and his mother was Lady Margaret Abernethy, daughter of Sir George Abernethy, 7th Lord Saltoun of Abernethy. He entered King's College, Aberdeen, in 1619. Upon the death of his father in 1636, he inherited the lands of Philorth as its 10th Laird.

Alexander subscribed the Solemn League and Covenant at Aberdeen in 1638 and was a member of the General Assembly of the Church of Scotland at Glasgow in 1639. Also in 1639, while serving under the Earl of Montrose, he led 200 men against the castles of Kellie and Gight. He was chosen as a commissioner for Aberdeenshire in 1643 and this capacity attended the Convention of Estates in Edinburgh. After King Charles I was apprehended and taken to England, Saltoun took part in the failed rescue mission to England in 1648, commanding a regiment of Scots. In the reign of Charles II, he is known to have lent large sums of money to the king. He was a Member of Parliament for Aberdeenshire twice, first in 1648 and again in 1661-63.

During the English Civil War, he fought in the Royalist cause at the Battle of Worcester (1651) in which he was severely wounded and might have been killed had it not been for his servant, James Cardno, who rescued him, saw to his recovery and returned him to his home at Fraserburgh.

In 1669, Fraser served as commissioner for the visitation of the two colleges of Aberdeen. In 1670, his succession to the Lordship of Saltoun of Abernethy was ratified by King Charles II and confirmed by Act of Parliament.

== Succession and numbering ==
Alexander Fraser, now designated the 11th Lord Saltoun, was traditionally designated the 10th because after the death of the 9th Lord Saltoun (Alexander Abernethy, 1611-1668), his sister Margaret Fraser, née Abernethy (1616-1669), succeeded with the title 10th Lady Saltoun. However, she survived her brother by only two and a half months, and the title passed to Alexander Fraser, cousin of the Abernethys through his maternal line. In recent times, it was realized that Margaret had her title by the old Scots system of succession, and the decision was made to renumber the Lords Saltoun. As a result, Lady Saltoun is designated the 10th in the succession with Alexander Fraser, accordingly, moving from 10th to 11th in the succession.

== Family ==
Fraser married twice. His first wife was Isobel Forbes of Tolquhorn, who bore him one daughter, Janet. His second wife was Elizabeth Urquhart, née Seton, widow of John Urquhart of Craigfintrie and daughter of Alexander Seton of Meldrum. She was the mother of Fraser's son, Alexander, who predeceased him in 1672, necessitating that the title of 12th Lord Saltoun pass to William Fraser (1654-1715), grandson of the 11th Lord.

== Death and memory ==
Alexander Fraser, the 11th Lord Saltoun of Abernethy, died on 11 August 1693 at the age of 89. He was remembered in the registry of the Episcopal Congregation of Fraserburgh in these words:

He was a man that was given to the reading of good books, and very much in the exercise of prayer, both in his closet; and when he had to meet with a minister of churchman of his profession: He would alwise [sic] desire them to pray before they parted with him. He was very civil and kind to all whom he had the freedom to converse with. He was also very charitable to the poor, at all occasions, wherever he and they did meet.

He was buried at Fraserburgh.

== Notes ==
Peerage of Scotland
Preceded by Margaret Abernethy	Lord Saltoun; 1669–1693	Succeeded by William Fraser
