= Lord Saltoun =

Scottish title peerage

Lordship of Saltoun
- Azure three fraises (cinquefoils) argent
- Creation date: 28 June 1445
- Created by: James II
- Peerage: Peerage of Scotland
- First holder: Lawrence Abernethy, 1st Lord Saltoun
- Present holder: Katharine Fraser, 22nd Lady Saltoun
- Heir apparent: Alexander Fraser, Master of Saltoun
- Remainder to: Heirs general
- Subsidiary titles: Master of Saltoun
- Seats: Cairnbulg Castle; Inverey House
- Former seat: Mar Lodge
- Motto: Dexter (over cross): All my hope is in God; Sinister (over crest): In God is All

Lord Saltoun, of Abernethy, is a title in the Peerage of Scotland. It was created in 1445 for Sir Lawrence Abernethy. The title remained in the Abernethy family until the death in 1669 of his descendant the tenth Lady Saltoun. She was succeeded by her cousin Alexander Fraser, the eleventh Lord. He was the son of Alexander Fraser and Margaret Abernethy, daughter of the seventh Lord Saltoun. The title has remained in the Frasers of Philorth family ever since.

The seventeenth Lord was a Lieutenant-General in the Army and sat in the House of Lords as a Scottish representative peer from 1807 to 1853. His nephew, the eighteenth Lord, was a Scottish representative peer from 1859 to 1866. His son, the nineteenth Lord, and grandson, the twentieth Lord, were also Scottish representative peers, between 1890 and 1933 and 1935 and 1963, respectively. From 1979 to 2024, the title was held by the latter's daughter, the 21st Lady Saltoun. She was head of the Frasers of Philorth and was also one of the ninety elected hereditary peers that remain in the House of Lords after the passing of the House of Lords Act 1999 (resigning her seat in the House in 2014).

The family seats are Cairnbulg Castle, near Fraserburgh, Aberdeenshire, and Inverey House, near Braemar, Aberdeenshire.

== Numbering scheme ==
In the 20th century, it was determined that Margaret Abernethy (now 10th Lady Saltoun), succeeded her brother, Alexander Abernethy, 9th Lord Saltoun, in 1668, but only survived him by about 10 weeks and had not previously been counted in the title's numbering. This new information has resulted in the ordinals in subsequent Lords Saltoun being revised. As a result, the later heirs to the title are often referenced with the incorrect numbering.

In reality this may be a point of law. Some transcripts note that Alexander Fraser (traditionally the 10th Lord) was legally recognised at the heir to his cousin, Alexander Abernethy, 9th Lord Saltoun. As such, by Act of Parliament confirmed by a charter from the King, this would make the first Fraser Lord Saltoun the legal successor of the 9th Lord, regardless of the status of Margaret Abernethy. As such there is argument that the traditional numbering should remain in use due to legal technicality. It must also be recognised that it has been known in the historiography since the 19th Century that Margaret Abernethy survived her brother. Sources from the time also confirm knowledge of her existence, yet Alexander Fraser was still confirmed as the 10th Lord, in succession to Alexander and not Margaret. As far as is known Margaret never assumed the title of Lady Saltoun in her lifetime.

== Lords Saltoun (1445) ==
- Lawrence Abernethy, 1st Lord Saltoun (1400–1460)
- William de Abernethy, 2nd Baron of Saltoun (d. 1488)
- James Abernethy, 3rd Lord Saltoun (d. 1505), brother of the 2nd Lord
- Alexander Abernethy, 4th Lord Saltoun (d. 1527)
- William Abernethy, 5th Lord Saltoun (d. 1540)
- Alexander Abernethy, 6th Lord Saltoun (d. 1587)
- George Abernethy, 7th Lord Saltoun (1555–1590)
- John Abernethy, 8th Lord Saltoun (1578–1612)
- Alexander Abernethy, 9th Lord Saltoun (1611–1668)
- Margaret Abernethy, 10th Lady Saltoun (1609–1669) (not traditionally counted)
- Alexander Fraser, 11th Lord Saltoun (1604–1693) (traditionally 10th Lord)
- William Fraser, 12th Lord Saltoun (1654–1715) (traditionally 11th Lord)
- Alexander Fraser, 13th Lord Saltoun (1684–1748) (traditionally 12th Lord)
- Alexander Fraser, 14th Lord Saltoun (1710–1751) (traditionally 13th Lord)
- George Fraser, 15th Lord Saltoun (1720–1781) (traditionally 14th Lord)
- Alexander Fraser, 16th Lord Saltoun (1758–1793) (traditionally 15th Lord)
- Alexander George Fraser, 17th Lord Saltoun (1785–1853) (traditionally 16th Lord)
- Alexander Fraser, 18th Lord Saltoun (1820–1886) (traditionally 17th Lord)
- Alexander William Frederick Fraser, 19th Lord Saltoun (1851–1933) (traditionally 18th Lord)
- Alexander Arthur Fraser, 20th Lord Saltoun (1886–1979) (traditionally 19th Lord)
- Flora Marjory Fraser, 21st Lady Saltoun (1930–2024) (traditionally 20th Lady)
- Katharine Ingrid Mary Isabel Fraser, 22nd Lady Saltoun (Note: Lady Saltoun and Alexander Fraser's surnames would all not normally be "Fraser." However, because they are in line to be (or are already) the Chief of the name and arms of Fraser, their surnames have been recognized by the Lord Lyon King of Arms to be "Fraser.") (b. 1957) (traditionally 21st Lady)

The heir apparent is the present holder's son Alexander William Malise Fraser, Master of Saltoun (born 1990), who acted as Page of Honour to Queen Elizabeth II.

== Line of Succession ==
- Flora Fraser, 21st Lady Saltoun (1930–2024)
  - Katharine Fraser, 22nd Lady Saltoun (b. 1957)
    - (1) The Hon. Alexander Fraser, Master of Saltoun (b. 1990)
    - (2) The Hon. Louise Morshead (née Nicolson; b. 1984)
      - (3) Rory Morshead (b. 2015)
      - (4) Frederick Morshead (b. 2018)
    - (5) The Hon. Juliet Rood (née Nicolson; b. 1988)
      - (6) Albert Rood (b. 2018)
      - (7) Edmund Rood (b. 2020)
      - (8) Xanthe Rood (b. 2023)
  - (9) The Hon. Alice Ramsey (née Ramsay of Mar; b. 1961)
    - (10) Alexander Ramsey (b. 1991)
    - (11) George Ramsey (b. 1995)
    - (12) Oliver Ramsey (b. 1995)
    - (13) Victoria Ramsey (b. 1994)
  - (14) The Hon. Elizabeth Ramsay of Mar (b. 1963)

== See also ==
- Lord Saltoun and Auchanachie, a Scottish folk song
