= Katharine Fraser, 22nd Lady Saltoun =

Scottish noble

The Right Honourable The Lady Saltoun DL

Vice Lord-Lieutenant of Aberdeenshire
- Incumbent
- Assumed office 13 June 2025

Personal details
- Born: Katharine Ingrid Mary Isabel Ramsay; 11 October 1957 (age 68) Fraserburgh, Scotland
- Spouse: Mark Nicolson (m. 1980)
- Children: The Hon. Louise Alexandra Patricia Nicolson; The Hon. Juliet Nicolson; The Hon. Alexander Fraser, Master of Saltoun
- Parent(s): Alexander Ramsay of Mar; Flora Fraser, 21st Lady Saltoun

Katharine Ingrid Mary Isabel Fraser, 22nd Lady Saltoun (née Ramsay; born 11 October 1957), is a Scottish peer. She is the daughter of Alexander Ramsay of Mar and Flora Fraser, 21st Lady Saltoun. As the granddaughter of Princess Patricia of Connaught, she is a second cousin of King Carl XVI Gustaf of Sweden and Queen Margrethe II of Denmark, and a distant relative of the British royal family.

== Biography ==
Saltoun was born Katharine Ingrid Mary Isabel Ramsay in Fraserburgh, Aberdeenshire, on 11 October 1957. Her mother, Flora, 21st Lady Saltoun, was the suo jure Lady Saltoun and the Chief of the Name and Arms of Clan Fraser. Her father, Alexander Ramsay of Mar, member of the Ramsay family, was the son of the former Princess Patricia of Connaught and a great-grandson of Queen Victoria. Her godparents included Queen Ingrid of Denmark and the Princess Royal.

Born with her father's surname, and since 1959 having used her father's territorial designation of Mar, the Court of the Lord Lyon recognized her use of the surname Fraser in 1973. As she had no brothers, she was styled as Mistress of Saltoun as her mother's heir presumptive. She succeeded her mother as suo jure 22nd Lady Saltoun and clan chief on 3 September 2024.

On 20 April 2005, Saltoun was appointed a deputy lieutenant of Aberdeenshire. On 13 June 2025, Saltoun was appointed Vice Lord-Lieutenant of Aberdeenshire.

== Marriage and children ==
In February 1980, her engagement to Captain Mark Malise Nicolson (born 29 September 1954), of the Irish Guards, was announced. He is the son of Malise Nicolson and his wife, Vivian Riley. Queen Elizabeth II granted her consent to the marriage under the Royal Marriages Act 1772 on 13 February 1980. They were married on 3 May 1980. They have three children, including the Hon. Alexander Fraser, Master of Saltoun (born 1990), his mother's heir apparent and sometime Page of Honour to Queen Elizabeth II.

Peerage of Scotland
| Preceded by Flora Fraser | Lady Saltoun; 2024–present | Incumbent; Heir apparent: The Hon. Alexander Fraser |
Lines of succession
| Preceded by Princess Theodora of Greece and Denmark | Line of succession to the British throne descendant of Prince Arthur, Duke of Connaught and Strathearn, son of Queen Victoria | Succeeded by Alexander Fraser |
