= W. Douglas Simpson =

Scottish academic and writer

William Douglas Simpson
- Portrait of W. Douglas Simpson by Alberto Morrocco
- Born: 2 August 1896; Aberdeen
- Died: 9 October 1968 (aged 72)
- Occupations: Librarian, archaeologist
- Spouse: Ellen Dorothy Mason

Academic background
- Education: University of Aberdeen

William Douglas Simpson CBE (2 August 1896 – 9 October 1968) was a Scottish academic and writer who focused on the study of medieval architecture and archaeology.

== Career ==
Simpson was appointed Assistant in History at the University of Aberdeen in 1919, before becoming Lecturer in British History in 1920. He was appointed librarian at Aberdeen University in 1926, a post he held for forty years. Simpson later held the honorary positions of Rhind Lecturer in Archaeology (1941) and Dalrymple Lecturer in Archaeology (1950) at the University of Glasgow.

Although not a trained archaeologist, he directed excavations at Kildrummy Castle, Coull Castle, Kindrochit Castle, Doune of Invernochty, Esslemont Castle, Dundarg Castle and Finavon Castle. Although his archaeological findings have been superseded, his detailed studies of buildings and structures remain key documents.

He wrote numerous books and articles based on this and other research, through which he became well known as an authority on the castellated architecture of Scotland and Scandinavia. He held several appointments in relation to this work, including chairman of the Ancient Monuments Board for Scotland and membership of the Royal Commission on the Ancient and Historical Monuments of Scotland. He was a member of the Scottish National Portrait Gallery Advisory Board and Scottish Records Advisory Council.

W. Douglas Simpson was the author of a wide range of publications on architectural matters, from academic papers to general guides aimed at the tourist. Several of his guidebooks remain in print by Historic Scotland. His lectures and talks were hugely successful and well attended not just by students but a more general audience. He was a Commissioner at the RCAHMS.

== Personal life ==
Simpson was born in Aberdeen, one of four children of H.F. Morland Simpson (1859–1920), an antiquarian and Rector of Aberdeen Grammar School and his German wife, Jenny Friderike Dohm (ca. 1866–1949). He joined the 4th Gordon Highlanders in 1913, but was discharged on medical grounds in 1914. He carried out work for the Admiralty in Scotland from 1915 to 1918. He graduated from the University of Aberdeen with a first class honours MA in 1919, and a D.Litt. in 1924.

Simpson was appointed OBE in 1954 and CBE in 1962. He was appointed Commander of the Royal Norwegian Order of St. Olav. He is buried in Springbank Cemetery, Countesswells Road, Aberdeen; his wife, Ellen Dorothy Simpson (née Mason), whom he married in 1935, died in 1984 and was buried with him in the same grave.

== Selected publications ==
- The Historical Saint Columba (1927)
- Castles from the Air (1949)
- Dundarg Castle (1954)
- Dunstaffnage Castle and the Stone of Destiny (1958)
- Scottish Castles: An Introduction to the Castles of Scotland. H.M. Stationery Office. 1959.
- Urquhart Castle Official Guide. H.M. Stationery Office. 1964.
- The Ancient Stones of Scotland (1965)
- The Highlands of Scotland (1976)
