= Cairnbulg Castle =

14th-century castle in Aberdeenshire, Scotland

Coordinates: 57.6656°N 1.9736°W

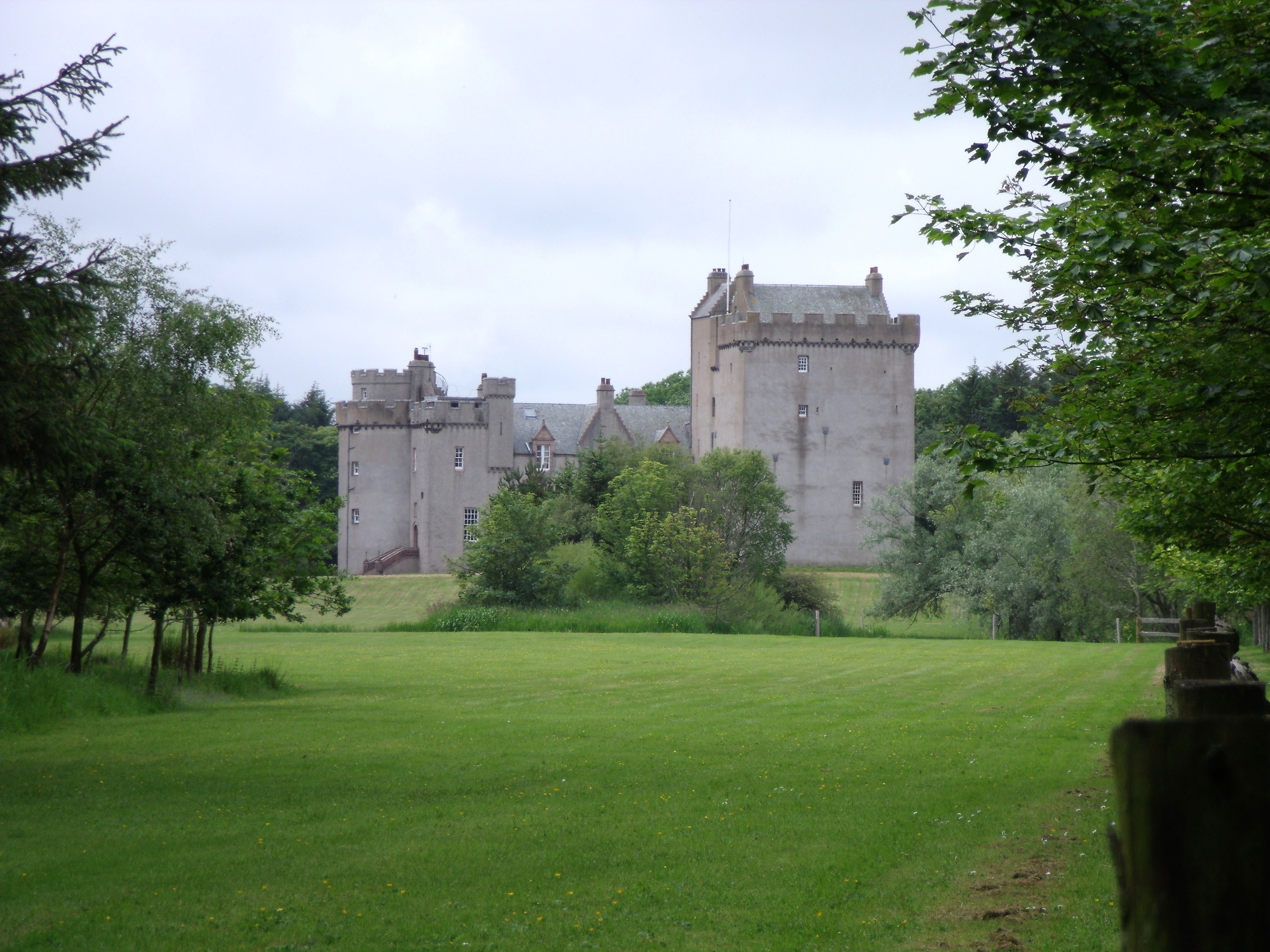
- Cairnbulg Castle in 2011
- Interactive map of the Cairnbulg Castle area

General information
- Location: Scotland

Cairnbulg Castle is a z-plan castle situated in Cairnbulg, Aberdeenshire, Scotland. It was described by W. Douglas Simpson as one of the nine castles of the Knuckle, referring to the rocky headland of north-east Aberdeenshire. It stands by the River Philorth and was originally known as Philorth Castle (or Philorth House). The 17th-century Philorth Castle, an L-plan house consisting of a sizeable crow-stepped block, was demolished after a fire in 1915.

== History ==
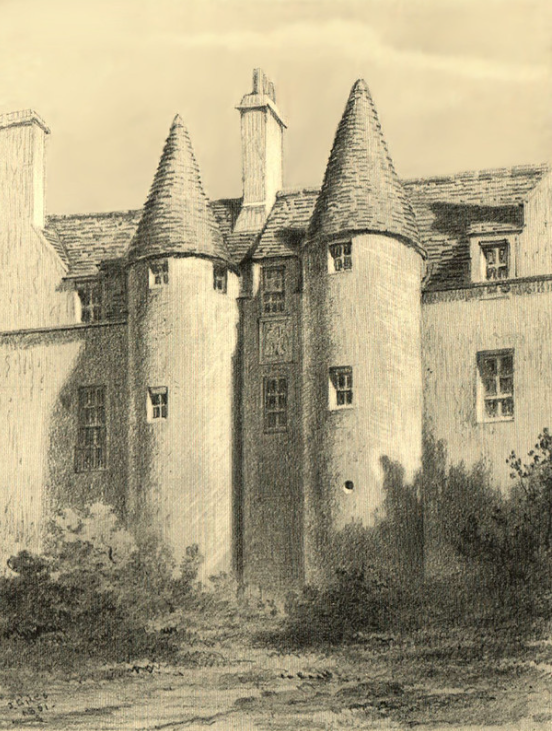
Philorth Castle, demolished in the first half of the 20th century. In view here are the two pepperpot-turreted round towers at its centre

The castle was built in the early 14th century but destroyed in the winter of 1308–1309 in the Wars of Independence. After being owned by the Comyns up until 1375, it was subsequently granted to the Earls of Ross. It was rebuilt in 1380 after the daughter of the 5th Earl married Sir Alexander Fraser of Cowie. In 1545, a second, round, tower, a courtyard and outbuildings were added to the original main square tower.

In 1613, after nearly bankrupting themselves, the Frasers of Philorth sold the castle, which — after passing through several other families of the Fraser clan, including the Frasers of Durris — ended up in 1775 with George Gordon, 3rd Earl of Aberdeen, who removed anything of value. It lay abandoned by 1799.

In 1896, the two towers were restored and its central building rebuilt by Jenkins & Marr for Sir John Duthie, a barrister. In the late Victorian period the castle, by now almost a ruin after a 1915 fire, was purchased and restored by the wealthy Duthie family of Aberdeen. In 1934, it returned to the Fraser family after being bought by Lord Saltoun, a direct descendant of the 8th Laird. Flora Fraser, 21st Lady Saltoun, and her husband, Captain Alexander Ramsay of Mar, who was one of Queen Victoria's great-grandchildren, lived there for a while. Their daughter, Katharine Fraser, Mistress of Saltoun (now 22nd Lady Saltoun), took possession of the castle in 1997. During the Second World War, the castle was used as the Officers' Mess for nearby RAF Fraserburgh.

Philorth Bridge Halt railway station once stood nearby on the old Fraserburgh and St Combs Light Railway.

Cairnbulg Castle is open to the public only by appointment.
