= Groom in Waiting =

The office of Groom in Waiting (sometimes hyphenated as Groom-in-Waiting) was a post in the Royal Household of the United Kingdom, which in earlier times was usually held by more than one person at a time – in the late Middle Ages there might be dozens of persons with the rank, though the Esquires and Knights of the Body were more an important and select group. Grooms-in-Waiting to other members of the Royal Family and Extra Grooms in Waiting were also sometimes appointed. For the general history of court valets or grooms see Valet de chambre.

From the time of the Restoration (1660), the king was attended by Grooms of the Bedchamber, whose functions as attendants on the monarch's person were performed in the reign of Queen Anne by Women of the Bedchamber. By the time of Queen Victoria, however, the majority of political offices no longer involving regular attendance on the sovereign, there were appointed, in addition to the Queen's Women of the Bedchamber, eight Grooms in Waiting who would discharge those political and social functions of the Grooms of the Bedchamber which could not be undertaken by the Queen's attendants of the female sex. After Queen Victoria's reign, the nomenclature of "Grooms in Waiting" was retained in preference to "Grooms of the Bedchamber".

One of the holders of the office was designated the Parliamentary Groom in Waiting from about 1859, when it became customary to appoint a Member of Parliament who was a supporter of the government of the day. In addition to his political functions, the Parliamentary Groom in Waiting was in attendance on the Queen with the other grooms. The office became vacant in 1891, when Brownlow Cecil, Baron Burghley was promoted to the similar political office of Vice-Chamberlain of the Household. The political office fell into disuse in 1892, since which time it has not been revived, although this did not affect the non-political, court position of Groom in Waiting.

== List of Parliamentary Grooms in Waiting ==
- 1859 Robert Nigel Fitzhardinge Kingscote (Liberal-West Gloucestershire)
- 1866 Charles Hugh Lindsay (Conservative-Abingdon)
- 1869 Algernon Fulke Greville (Liberal-Westmeath)
- 1874 Donald Cameron (of Lochiel) (Conservative-Inverness-shire)
- 1880 William Carington (Liberal-Wycombe)
- 1883 William Henry Grenfell (Liberal-not MP at the time)
- 1883 Sir Gerard Smith (Liberal-Wycombe)
- 1885 Sir Henry Aubrey-Fletcher, 4th Baronet (Conservative-Lewes)
- 1886 Charles Robert Spencer (Liberal-Mid Northamptonshire)
- 1886 Brownlow Cecil, Baron Burghley (Conservative-North Northamptonshire)
- 1891 office vacant
- 1892 office abolished

== List of all Grooms in Waiting ==
=== Victoria (1837–1901) ===
In Ordinary

Date								
17 July 1837	General Sir William Lumley	Admiral Sir Robert Otway, Bt	Colonel Thomas Armstrong	Charles Augustus Murray	William Cowper MP	Henry Rich MP	Sir Henry Seton, Bart.	
27 July 1837	General Sir William Lumley	Admiral Sir Robert Otway, Bt	Colonel Thomas Armstrong	Charles Augustus Murray	William Cowper MP	Henry Rich MP	Sir Henry Seton, Bart.	Colonel Sir Frederick Stovin
12 June 1838	General Sir William Lumley	Admiral Sir Robert Otway, Bt	Colonel Thomas Armstrong	George Keppel	William Cowper MP	Henry Rich MP	Sir Henry Seton, Bart.	Colonel Sir Frederick Stovin
7 September 1841	General Sir William Lumley	Admiral Sir Robert Otway, Bt	Captain Henry Meynell	George Keppel	William Cowper MP	Henry Rich MP	Sir Henry Seton, Bart.	Colonel Sir Frederick Stovin
14 September 1841	General Sir William Lumley	Admiral Sir Robert Otway, Bt	Captain Henry Meynell	George Keppel	William Cowper MP	John Ormsby-Gore	Sir Henry Seton, Bart.	Colonel Sir Frederick Stovin
21 September 1841	General Sir William Lumley	Admiral Sir Robert Otway, Bt	Captain Henry Meynell	Captain Alexander Nelson Hood	William Cowper MP	John Ormsby-Gore	Sir Henry Seton, Bart.	Colonel Sir Frederick Stovin
24 September 1841	General Sir William Lumley	Admiral Sir Robert Otway, Bt	Captain Henry Meynell	Captain Alexander Nelson Hood	Arthur Duncombe MP	John Ormsby-Gore	Sir Henry Seton, Bart.	Colonel Sir Frederick Stovin
7 November 1842	Lieutenant-General Berkeley Drummond	Admiral Sir Robert Otway, Bt	Captain Henry Meynell	Captain Alexander Nelson Hood	Arthur Duncombe MP	John Ormsby-Gore	Sir Henry Seton, Bart.	Colonel Sir Frederick Stovin
3 March 1846	Lieutenant-General Berkeley Drummond	Admiral Sir Robert Otway, Bt	Captain Henry Meynell	Captain Alexander Nelson Hood	Major-General Sir Edward Bowater	John Ormsby-Gore	Sir Henry Seton, Bart.	Colonel Sir Frederick Stovin
4 August 1846	Lieutenant-General Berkeley Drummond	Admiral Sir Edward Codrington	Captain Henry Meynell	Captain Alexander Nelson Hood	Major-General Sir Edward Bowater	John Ormsby-Gore	Sir Henry Seton, Bart.	Colonel Sir Frederick Stovin
5 October 1846	Lieutenant-General Berkeley Drummond	Admiral Sir Edward Codrington	Lieutenant Colonel Robert Edward Boyle MP	Captain Alexander Nelson Hood	Major-General Sir Edward Bowater	John Ormsby-Gore	Sir Henry Seton, Bart.	Colonel Sir Frederick Stovin
11 July 1848	Lieutenant-General Berkeley Drummond	Captain Joseph Denman	Lieutenant Colonel Robert Edward Boyle MP	Captain Alexander Nelson Hood	Major-General Sir Edward Bowater	John Ormsby-Gore	Sir Henry Seton, Bart.	Colonel Sir Frederick Stovin
23 March 1852	Lieutenant-General Berkeley Drummond	Captain Joseph Denman	William Stuart Knox MP	Captain Alexander Nelson Hood	Major-General Sir Edward Bowater	John Ormsby-Gore	Sir Henry Seton, Bart.	Colonel Sir Frederick Stovin
13 July 1852	Lieutenant-General Berkeley Drummond	Mortimer Sackville-West	William Stuart Knox MP	Captain Alexander Nelson Hood	Major-General Sir Edward Bowater	John Ormsby-Gore	Sir Henry Seton, Bart.	Colonel Sir Frederick Stovin
3 March 1853	Lieutenant-General Berkeley Drummond	Mortimer Sackville-West	Lieutenant Colonel Robert Edward Boyle MP	Captain Alexander Nelson Hood	Major-General Sir Edward Bowater	John Ormsby-Gore	Sir Henry Seton, Bart.	Colonel Sir Frederick Stovin
23 January 1854	Lieutenant-General Berkeley Drummond	Mortimer Sackville-West	Lieutenant Colonel William Henry Frederick Cavendish	Captain Alexander Nelson Hood	Major-General Sir Edward Bowater	John Ormsby-Gore	Sir Henry Seton, Bart.	Colonel Sir Frederick Stovin
21 January 1858	Lieutenant-General Berkeley Drummond	Mortimer Sackville-West	Lieutenant Colonel William Henry Frederick Cavendish	Colonel George Liddell	Major-General Sir Edward Bowater	John Ormsby-Gore	Sir Henry Seton, Bart.	Colonel Sir Frederick Stovin
25 June 1859	Lieutenant-General Berkeley Drummond	Mortimer Sackville-West	Lieutenant Colonel William Henry Frederick Cavendish	Colonel George Liddell	Major-General Sir Edward Bowater	Colonel Sir Robert Kingscote MP	Sir Henry Seton, Bart.	Colonel Sir Frederick Stovin
24 September 1859	Rear-Admiral Sir Henry Keppel	Mortimer Sackville-West	Lieutenant Colonel William Henry Frederick Cavendish	Colonel George Liddell	Major-General Sir Edward Bowater	Colonel Sir Robert Kingscote MP	Sir Henry Seton, Bart.	Colonel Sir Frederick Stovin
18 November 1859	Rear-Admiral Sir Henry Keppel	Mortimer Sackville-West	Lieutenant Colonel William Henry Frederick Cavendish	Colonel George Liddell	Major-General Sir Edward Bowater	Colonel Sir Robert Kingscote MP	Sir Henry Seton, Bart.	General Sir Henry Bentinck
17 April 1860	Rear-Admiral Sir William Hoste, Bart.	Mortimer Sackville-West	Lieutenant Colonel William Henry Frederick Cavendish	Colonel George Liddell	Major-General Sir Edward Bowater	Colonel Sir Robert Kingscote MP	Sir Henry Seton, Bart.	General Sir Henry Bentinck
26 December 1861	Rear-Admiral Sir William Hoste, Bart.	Mortimer Sackville-West	Lieutenant Colonel William Henry Frederick Cavendish	Colonel George Liddell	Colonel Lord James Murray	Colonel Sir Robert Kingscote MP	Sir Henry Seton, Bart.	General Sir Henry Bentinck
1 August 1866	Rear-Admiral Sir William Hoste, Bart.	Mortimer Sackville-West	Lieutenant Colonel William Henry Frederick Cavendish	Colonel George Liddell	Colonel Lord James Murray	Lieutenant Colonel Charles Hugh Lindsay MP	Sir Henry Seton, Bart.	General Sir Henry Bentinck
1 June 1867	Rear-Admiral Sir William Hoste, Bart.	Mortimer Sackville-West	Lieutenant Colonel William Henry Frederick Cavendish	Colonel George Liddell	Colonel Lord James Murray	Lieutenant Colonel Charles Hugh Lindsay MP	Sir Henry Seton, Bart.	Major-General Francis Seymour
18 January 1868	Rear-Admiral Lord Frederick Kerr	Mortimer Sackville-West	Lieutenant Colonel William Henry Frederick Cavendish	Colonel George Liddell	Colonel Lord James Murray	Lieutenant Colonel Charles Hugh Lindsay MP	Sir Henry Seton, Bart.	Major-General Francis Seymour
21 July 1868	Rear-Admiral Lord Frederick Kerr	Mortimer Sackville-West	Lieutenant Colonel William Henry Frederick Cavendish	Colonel George Liddell	Colonel Lord James Murray	Lieutenant Colonel Charles Hugh Lindsay MP		Major-General Francis Seymour
22 December 1868	Rear-Admiral Lord Frederick Kerr	Mortimer Sackville-West	Lieutenant Colonel William Henry Frederick Cavendish	Colonel George Liddell	Colonel Lord James Murray	Captain Algernon Greville-Nugent MP		Major-General Francis Seymour
1 January 1869	Rear-Admiral Lord Frederick Kerr	Mortimer Sackville-West	Lieutenant Colonel William Henry Frederick Cavendish	Colonel George Liddell	Colonel Lord James Murray	Captain Algernon Greville-Nugent MP	Lieutenant Colonel Ernest Augustus Murray MacGregor	Major-General Francis Seymour
8 March 1869	Rear-Admiral Lord Frederick Kerr	Mortimer Sackville-West	Lieutenant Colonel William Henry Frederick Cavendish	Colonel George Liddell	Colonel Lord James Murray	Captain Algernon Greville-Nugent MP	Colonel Henry Lyndenoch Gardiner	Major-General Francis Seymour
1 October 1872	Rear-Admiral Lord Frederick Kerr	Mortimer Sackville-West	Lieutenant Colonel William Henry Frederick Cavendish	Colonel George Liddell	Colonel Lord James Murray	Captain Algernon Greville-Nugent MP	Lieutenant Colonel Henry Byng	Major-General Francis Seymour
4 November 1873	Rear-Admiral Lord Frederick Kerr	Mortimer Sackville-West	Lieutenant Colonel William Henry Frederick Cavendish	Colonel George Liddell	Colonel Lord James Murray	William Edwardes, 4th Baron Kensington MP	Lieutenant Colonel Henry Byng	Major-General Francis Seymour
13 February 1874	Rear-Admiral Lord Frederick Kerr	Mortimer Sackville-West	Lieutenant Colonel William Henry Frederick Cavendish	Colonel George Liddell	Colonel Lord James Murray	William Edwardes, 4th Baron Kensington MP	John Francis Campbell of Islay	Major-General Francis Seymour
6 March 1874	Rear-Admiral Lord Frederick Kerr	Mortimer Sackville-West	Lieutenant Colonel William Henry Frederick Cavendish	Colonel George Liddell	Colonel Lord James Murray	[[Donald Cameron, 24th Lochiel|Donald Cameron of Lochiel MP	John Francis Campbell of Islay	Major-General Francis Seymour
26 May 1874	Rear-Admiral Lord Frederick Kerr	Mortimer Sackville-West	Lieutenant Colonel William Henry Frederick Cavendish	Colonel George Liddell	Captain John Edmund Commerell	[[Donald Cameron, 24th Lochiel|Donald Cameron of Lochiel MP	John Francis Campbell of Islay	Major-General Francis Seymour
24 February 1876	Rear-Admiral Lord Frederick Kerr	Mortimer Sackville-West	Lieutenant Colonel William Henry Frederick Cavendish	Colonel George Liddell	Captain John Edmund Commerell	[[Donald Cameron, 24th Lochiel|Donald Cameron of Lochiel MP	John Francis Campbell of Islay	Lieutenant Colonel Charles Hugh Lindsay
1 October 1876	Rear-Admiral Lord Frederick Kerr	Captain Charles Edmund Phipps	Lieutenant Colonel William Henry Frederick Cavendish	Colonel George Liddell	Captain John Edmund Commerell	[[Donald Cameron, 24th Lochiel|Donald Cameron of Lochiel MP	John Francis Campbell of Islay	Lieutenant Colonel Charles Hugh Lindsay
21 December 1877	Rear-Admiral Lord Frederick Kerr	Captain Charles Edmund Phipps	Major Arthur Frederick Pickard	Colonel George Liddell	Captain John Edmund Commerell	[[Donald Cameron, 24th Lochiel|Donald Cameron of Lochiel MP	John Francis Campbell of Islay	Lieutenant Colonel Charles Hugh Lindsay
9 December 1879	Rear-Admiral Lord Frederick Kerr	Captain Charles Edmund Phipps	Major Arthur Frederick Pickard	Colonel George Liddell	Major-General Sir Michael Biddulph	[[Donald Cameron, 24th Lochiel|Donald Cameron of Lochiel MP	John Francis Campbell of Islay	Lieutenant Colonel Charles Hugh Lindsay
1 January 1880	Rear-Admiral Lord Frederick Kerr	Lieutenant Arthur Bigge	Major Arthur Frederick Pickard	Colonel George Liddell	Major-General Sir Michael Biddulph	[[Donald Cameron, 24th Lochiel|Donald Cameron of Lochiel MP	John Francis Campbell of Islay	Lieutenant Colonel Charles Hugh Lindsay
22 March 1880	Rear-Admiral Lord Frederick Kerr	Lieutenant Arthur Bigge	Captain Fleetwood Edwards	Colonel George Liddell	Major-General Sir Michael Biddulph	[[Donald Cameron, 24th Lochiel|Donald Cameron of Lochiel MP	John Francis Campbell of Islay	Lieutenant Colonel Charles Hugh Lindsay
20 May 1880	Rear-Admiral Lord Frederick Kerr	Lieutenant Arthur Bigge	Captain Fleetwood Edwards	Colonel George Liddell	Major-General Sir Michael Biddulph	Lieutenant Colonel William Carington MP	John Francis Campbell of Islay	Lieutenant Colonel Charles Hugh Lindsay
24 July 1880	Rear-Admiral Lord Frederick Kerr	Lieutenant Arthur Bigge	Captain Fleetwood Edwards	Colonel George Liddell	Major-General Sir Michael Biddulph	Lieutenant Colonel William Carington MP	Captain Walter Douglas Somerset Campbell	Lieutenant Colonel Charles Hugh Lindsay
9 May 1881	Rear-Admiral Lord Frederick Kerr	Lieutenant Colonel Lord Edward Clinton	Captain Fleetwood Edwards	Colonel George Liddell	Major-General Sir Michael Biddulph	Lieutenant Colonel William Carington MP	Captain Walter Douglas Somerset Campbell	Lieutenant Colonel Charles Hugh Lindsay
29 December 1882	Rear-Admiral Lord Frederick Kerr	Lieutenant Colonel Lord Edward Clinton	Captain Fleetwood Edwards	Colonel Henry Ewart	Major-General Sir Michael Biddulph	Lieutenant Colonel William Carington MP	Captain Walter Douglas Somerset Campbell	Lieutenant Colonel Charles Hugh Lindsay
3 March 1883	Rear-Admiral Lord Frederick Kerr	Lieutenant Colonel Lord Edward Clinton	Captain Fleetwood Edwards	Colonel Henry Ewart	Major-General Sir Michael Biddulph	Colonel Gerard Smith MP	Captain Walter Douglas Somerset Campbell	Lieutenant Colonel Charles Hugh Lindsay
30 June 1884	Rear-Admiral Lord Frederick Kerr	Lieutenant Colonel Lord Edward Clinton	Captain Fleetwood Edwards	Alexander Grantham Yorke	Major-General Sir Michael Biddulph	Colonel Gerard Smith MP	Captain Walter Douglas Somerset Campbell	Lieutenant Colonel Charles Hugh Lindsay
8 July 1885	Rear-Admiral Lord Frederick Kerr	Lieutenant Colonel Lord Edward Clinton	Captain Fleetwood Edwards	Alexander Grantham Yorke	Major-General Sir Michael Biddulph	Sir Henry Aubrey-Fletcher, 4th Baronet	Captain Walter Douglas Somerset Campbell	Lieutenant Colonel Charles Hugh Lindsay
10 February 1886	Rear-Admiral Lord Frederick Kerr	Lieutenant Colonel Lord Edward Clinton	Captain Fleetwood Edwards	Alexander Grantham Yorke	Major-General Sir Michael Biddulph	Charles Robert Spencer MP	Captain Walter Douglas Somerset Campbell	Lieutenant Colonel Charles Hugh Lindsay
13 August 1886	Rear-Admiral Lord Frederick Kerr	Lieutenant Colonel Lord Edward Clinton	Captain Fleetwood Edwards	Alexander Grantham Yorke	Major-General Sir Michael Biddulph	Brownlow Cecil, Baron Burghley MP	Captain Walter Douglas Somerset Campbell	Lieutenant Colonel Charles Hugh Lindsay
8 April 1889	Rear-Admiral Lord Frederick Kerr	Lieutenant Colonel Lord Edward Clinton	Captain Fleetwood Edwards	Alexander Grantham Yorke	Major-General Sir Michael Biddulph	Brownlow Cecil, Baron Burghley MP	Captain Walter Douglas Somerset Campbell	Major Henry Legge
24 November 1891	Rear-Admiral Lord Frederick Kerr	Lieutenant Colonel Lord Edward Clinton	Captain Fleetwood Edwards	Alexander Grantham Yorke	Major-General Sir Michael Biddulph		Captain Walter Douglas Somerset Campbell	Major Henry Legge
31 December 1891	Admiral John Edmund Commerell	Lieutenant Colonel Lord Edward Clinton	Captain Fleetwood Edwards	Alexander Grantham Yorke	Major-General Sir Michael Biddulph		Captain Walter Douglas Somerset Campbell	Major Henry Legge
21 May 1892	Admiral John Edmund Commerell	Lieutenant Colonel Lord Edward Clinton	Captain Fleetwood Edwards	Alexander Grantham Yorke	Major-General Sir Michael Biddulph	Colonel Lord William Cecil	Captain Walter Douglas Somerset Campbell	Major Henry Legge
1 October 1893	Admiral John Edmund Commerell	Lieutenant Colonel Lord Edward Clinton	Captain Fleetwood Edwards	Alexander Grantham Yorke	Major-General Sir Michael Biddulph	Colonel Lord William Cecil	Captain Walter Douglas Somerset Campbell	Captain Malcolm Drummond
1 February 1895	Admiral John Edmund Commerell	Captain Charles Harbord	Captain Fleetwood Edwards	Alexander Grantham Yorke	Major-General Sir Michael Biddulph	Colonel Lord William Cecil	Captain Walter Douglas Somerset Campbell	Captain Malcolm Drummond
6 June 1895	Admiral John Edmund Commerell	Captain Charles Harbord	Colonel Henry Donald Browne	Alexander Grantham Yorke	Major-General Sir Michael Biddulph	Colonel Lord William Cecil	Captain Walter Douglas Somerset Campbell	Captain Malcolm Drummond
16 December 1895	Admiral John Edmund Commerell	Captain Charles Harbord	Colonel Henry Donald Browne	Alexander Grantham Yorke	Lieutenant Colonel Arthur Davidson	Colonel Lord William Cecil	Captain Walter Douglas Somerset Campbell	Captain Malcolm Drummond
30 June 1896	Admiral John Edmund Commerell	Captain Charles Harbord	Colonel Henry Donald Browne	Alexander Grantham Yorke	General Henry Lyndenoch Gardiner	Colonel Lord William Cecil	Captain Walter Douglas Somerset Campbell	Captain Malcolm Drummond
25 December 1897	Admiral John Edmund Commerell	Captain Charles Harbord	Colonel Henry Donald Browne	Alexander Grantham Yorke	Lieutenant-General Godfrey Clerk	Colonel Lord William Cecil	Captain Walter Douglas Somerset Campbell	Captain Malcolm Drummond

Extra

- 17 July 1837–18 December 1842 General Sir Frederick Augustus Wetherall
- 7 November 1842–15 December 1850 General Sir William Lumley
- 31 December 1844–3 June 1895 Charles Augustus Murray
- 24 September 1859–3 May 1860 Lieutenant-General Berkeley Drummond
- 28 March 1860–16 August 1865 General Sir Frederick Stovin
- 1 April 1861–26 December 1861 Colonel Lord James Murray
- 26 December 1861–1 June 1867 Colonel Francis Seymour
- 30 July 1866–22 January 1901 Lieutenant Walter George Stirling
- 24 February 1876–10 July 1890 Lieutenant General Francis Seymour
- 21 December 1877–11 March 1881 Lieutenant Colonel William Cavendish
- 23 October 1878–22 March 1880 Captain Fleetwood Edwards
- 29 December 1882–14 December 1888 Colonel George Liddell
- 13 April 1884–30 June 1884 Alexander Grantham Yorke
- 15 March 1888–22 January 1901 Major-General Thomas Dennehy
- 23 June 1891–31 December 1891 Admiral Sir John Edmund Commerell
- 31 December 1891–15 January 1896 Admiral Lord Frederick Kerr
- 16 December 1895–22 January 1901 General Sir Michael Biddulph

=== Edward VII (1901–1910) ===
In Ordinary

Date							
23 July 1901	Lieutenant Colonel Lord Edward Clinton	Sidney Greville	Harry Stonor	Admiral Sir John Fullerton	Sir Alexander Condie Stephen	General Godfrey Clerk	Captain Walter Douglas Somerset Campbell
14 November 1905	Lieutenant Colonel Lord Edward Clinton	Sidney Greville	Harry Stonor	Arthur Walsh	Sir Alexander Condie Stephen	General Godfrey Clerk	Captain Walter Douglas Somerset Campbell
18 July 1907	Sir Archibald Edmonstone, Bart.	Sidney Greville	Harry Stonor	Rear-Admiral Sir Archibald Berkeley Milne, Bart.]]	Sir Alexander Condie Stephen	General Godfrey Clerk	Captain Walter Douglas Somerset Campbell
4 June 1908	Sir Archibald Edmonstone, Bart.	Sidney Greville	Harry Stonor	Colonel Henry Streatfeild	Sir John Lister-Kaye, Bart.	General Godfrey Clerk	Captain Walter Douglas Somerset Campbell
9 October 1908	Sir Archibald Edmonstone, Bart.	Sidney Greville	Harry Stonor	Commander Charles Cunninghame Graham	Sir John Lister-Kaye, Bart.	General Godfrey Clerk	Captain Walter Douglas Somerset Campbell
30 November 1908	Sir Archibald Edmonstone, Bart.	Sidney Greville	Harry Stonor	Commander Charles Cunninghame Graham	Sir John Lister-Kaye, Bart.	Montague Eliot	Captain Walter Douglas Somerset Campbell

Extra

- 23 July 1901–6 May 1910 The Hon. Alexander Grantham Yorke
- 23 July 1901–6 May 1910 Major-General Sir Thomas Dennehy
- 23 July 1901–1 April 1909 Sir Maurice Holzmann
- 23 July 1901–23 July 1905 General Sir Michael Biddulph
- 23 October 1905–6 May 1910 Admiral Sir John Fullerton
- 25 June 1909–6 May 1910 Sir Donald Mackenzie Wallace

=== George V (1910–1936) ===
In Ordinary

Date									
10 June 1910	Captain Seymour John Fortescue	Sidney Greville	Harry Stonor	Commander Charles Cunninghame Graham	Colonel William Lambton	Edward William Wallington, Esq.	Captain Walter Douglas Somerset Campbell		
2 January 1911	Harry Lloyd-Verney	Captain Philip Hunloke	Harry Stonor	Commander Charles Cunninghame Graham	Colonel William Lambton	Edward William Wallington, Esq.	Captain Walter Douglas Somerset Campbell		
14 April 1916	Harry Lloyd-Verney	Captain Philip Hunloke	Harry Stonor	Commander Charles Cunninghame Graham	Colonel William Lambton	Edward William Wallington, Esq.	Colonel Claude Willoughby		
6 July 1917	Harry Lloyd-Verney	Captain Philip Hunloke	Harry Stonor	Rear-Admiral Henry Hervey Campbell	Colonel William Lambton	Edward William Wallington, Esq.	Colonel Claude Willoughby		
21 March 1919	Harry Lloyd-Verney	Captain Philip Hunloke	Harry Stonor	Rear-Admiral Henry Hervey Campbell	Colonel William Lambton	Edward William Wallington, Esq.	Colonel Claude Willoughby	Richard Molyneux	
3 December 1920	Harry Lloyd-Verney	Captain Philip Hunloke	Harry Stonor	Rear-Admiral Henry Hervey Campbell	Colonel William Lambton	Edward William Wallington, Esq.	Colonel Claude Willoughby	Richard Molyneux	Sidney Greville
12 June 1927	Harry Lloyd-Verney	Captain Philip Hunloke	Harry Stonor	Rear-Admiral Henry Hervey Campbell	Colonel William Lambton	Edward William Wallington, Esq.	Colonel Claude Willoughby	Richard Molyneux	
9 June 1931	Sir Gerald Chichester	Captain Philip Hunloke	Harry Stonor	Rear-Admiral Henry Hervey Campbell	Colonel William Lambton	Edward William Wallington, Esq.	Colonel Claude Willoughby	Richard Molyneux	
6 May 1932	Sir Gerald Chichester	Captain Philip Hunloke	Harry Stonor	Rear-Admiral Henry Hervey Campbell	Colonel William Lambton	Colonel Sir Victor Mackenzie, 3rd Baronet	Colonel Claude Willoughby	Richard Molyneux	
11 October 1932	Sir Gerald Chichester	Captain Philip Hunloke	Harry Stonor	Rear-Admiral Henry Hervey Campbell	Colonel William Lambton	Colonel Sir Victor Mackenzie, 3rd Baronet	Admiral Sir Henry Buller	Richard Molyneux	
26 May 1933	Sir Gerald Chichester	Captain Philip Hunloke	Harry Stonor	Brigadier-General George Paynter	Colonel William Lambton	Colonel Sir Victor Mackenzie, 3rd Baronet	Admiral Sir Henry Buller	Richard Molyneux	

Extra

- 10 June 1910–10 January 1919 Sir Donald Mackenzie Wallace
- 10 June 1910–29 June 1918 Admiral Sir John Fullerton
- 14 April 1916–17 April 1919 Sir Walter Campbell
- 1 May 1924–20 January 1936 Montague Eliot
- 9 June 1931–20 January 1936 Sir Harry Lloyd Verney

=== Edward VIII (1936) ===
In Ordinary

No ordinary grooms-in-waiting were appointed to attend Edward VIII during his reign as King-Emperor.

Extra

- 21 July 1936–11 December 1936 Montague Eliot
- 21 July 1936–11 December 1936 Sir Harry Lloyd Verney
- 21 July 1936–11 December 1936 Sir Harry Stonor
- 21 July 1936–11 December 1936 Major Sir Philip Hunloke
- 21 July 1936–11 December 1936 Colonel Sir Victor Mackenzie, 3rd Baronet

=== George VI (1936–1952) ===
In Ordinary

- 2 March 1937–11 December 1945 Rear-Admiral Sir Basil Vernon Brooke
- 2 March 1937–3 August 1937 Commander Sir Harold George Campbell
- 2 March 1937–6 February 1952 Arthur Horace Penn, Esq.
- 2 March 1937–30 January 1942 Colonel Sir George Sidney Herbert, Bart.
- 3 August 1937–6 February 1952 Captain Richard John Streatfeild (in the room of Commander Sir Harold George Campbell)
- 3 August 1937–6 February 1952 Brigadier-General George Paynter

Extra

- 2 March 1937–6 February 1952 Montague Eliot
- 2 March 1937–28 February 1950 Sir Harry Lloyd Verney
- 2 March 1937–5 May 1939 Sir Harry Stonor
- 2 March 1937–1 April 1947 Major Sir Philip Hunloke
- 2 March 1937–18 April 1944 Colonel Sir Victor Mackenzie, Bart.
- 3 August 1937–27 November 1951 Sir Frank Herbert Mitchell

=== Elizabeth II (1952–2022) ===
In Ordinary

- 5 August 1952–30 December 1960 Sir Arthur Horace Penn

Extra

- 5 August 1952–19 September 1960 Montague Eliot, 8th Earl of St Germans
