= Harold J. Milne =

Scottish politician

Major Harold James Milne, OBE, MC, DL, JP (10 March 1889 – 15 April 1963) was a figure in local government in the north east of Scotland, and a recipient of the Military Cross.

Born in Fraserburgh, he was the son of a prominent local solicitor, James Milne, and Mary Tarras. He followed in his father's footsteps taking up his training at the University of Aberdeen in 1912, but his studies were cut short in 1914 when he volunteered for the Army.

During the First World War, he rose through the ranks to become an Acting Captain in the Gordon Highlanders. During the Battle of Arras in April 1917, he received a gunshot wound to the face, almost losing his left eye. In October 1918, he was awarded the Military Cross for conducting "the advance of his company to a position in front with great gallantry and skill...showing complete indifference to danger while taking up dispositions in a heavily shelled wood".

When the war ended he returned to his hometown of Fraserburgh, being active in the Ex-Servicemens' Association, as well as other community-based organisations. He was an Elder at Fraserburgh Old Parish Church. He was a keen supporter of the Boys' Brigade, serving as the second Company Captain of the 1st Fraserburgh Boys' Brigade from 1924 until the outbreak of war in 1940. He returned to his war duties, attaining the rank of Honorary Major.

He was for many years elected to the Fraserburgh Town Council, serving as a Baillie for the majority of his time there. He was, though, elected as Provost of Fraserburgh in 1950, a role he held until 1956. In 1954, he was appointed a Deputy Lieutenant of Aberdeenshire, also being appointed an OBE in 1954 for services to local government.

He was the first person to be awarded the Freedom of the Town of Fraserburgh.
