= James Ingleby =

James Richard Ingleby CVO DL (born March 1945) was appointed Lord-Lieutenant of Aberdeenshire by Her Majesty The Queen on 13 July 2010 having been made a Deputy Lieutenant in July 1992. He is an associate of the Royal Institution of Chartered Surveyors, a member of the Royal Company of Archers, a former director of Aberdeen and Northern Marts and a past chairman of the North East Landowners Federation and of the North East Sail Training Association. He is currently a partner in a 1,200 acre organic farm and tends 300 acres of forestry. He was appointed Commander of the Royal Victorian Order (CVO) in the 2019 Birthday Honours.

Ingleby is married to Moira Ingleby, a Conservative local authority councillor for Huntly, Strathbogie and Howe of Alford in Aberdeenshire. They have four children. The eldest is Catherine Ingleby, a sporting artist.

Honorary titles
Preceded by Sir Angus Farquharson	Lord Lieutenant of Aberdeenshire; 2010–2020	Succeeded by Alexander Philip Manson
