= William Seymour (cricketer) =

Irish cricketer and clergyman

Personal information
- Full name: William Seymour
- Born: 23 February 1817; Belfast, Ireland
- Died: 18 March 1893 (aged 76); Bournemouth, Hampshire, England
- Batting: Unknown

Domestic team information
- Years: Team
- 1837: Oxford University

Career statistics
Competition	First-class
Matches	1
Runs scored	2
Batting average	1.00
100s/50s	–/–
Top score	2
Catches/stumpings	–/–
- Source: Cricinfo, 25 June 2020

William Seymour (23 February 1817 – 18 March 1893) was an Irish first-class cricketer and clergyman.

Seymour was born in February 1817 to Henry Augustus Seymour and Margaret Williams, in Belfast. His father was the illegitimate son of Francis Seymour-Conway, 2nd Marquess of Hertford and was given family property in Ireland, a secured private income, as well as a position in the customs service. However, this all ended with the succession of the 3rd Marquis of Hertford in 1822, and Henry Seymour was forced to take his family to Brussels, Belgium to reside. Seymour was later educated in England at Harrow School, before going up to Magdalen Hall, Oxford. While studying at Oxford, he made a single appearance in first-class cricket for Oxford University against the Marylebone Cricket Club at Oxford in 1837. Batting twice in the match, he was dismissed without scoring by James Cobbett in the Oxford first innings, while in their second innings he was dismissed by the same bowler for 2 runs. Seymour transferred to Trinity Hall at the University of Cambridge in October 1839.

After graduating from Cambridge, Seymour took holy orders in the Church of England in 1842. He was appointed a priest at Exeter in 1843, before becoming curate of Mavesyn Ridware in Staffordshire from 1842 to 1847. He moved to Cornwall in 1847, where he served as rector of Landulph until 1871. His final appointment was as vicar of Watford, Northamptonshire until 1890, after which he retired to Bournemouth. Seymour died there in March 1893. His siblings included the colonial administrator Frederick Seymour and the British Army officer Sir Francis Seymour.
