= Walter Lumsden =

Royal Navy and Royal Indian Marine officer

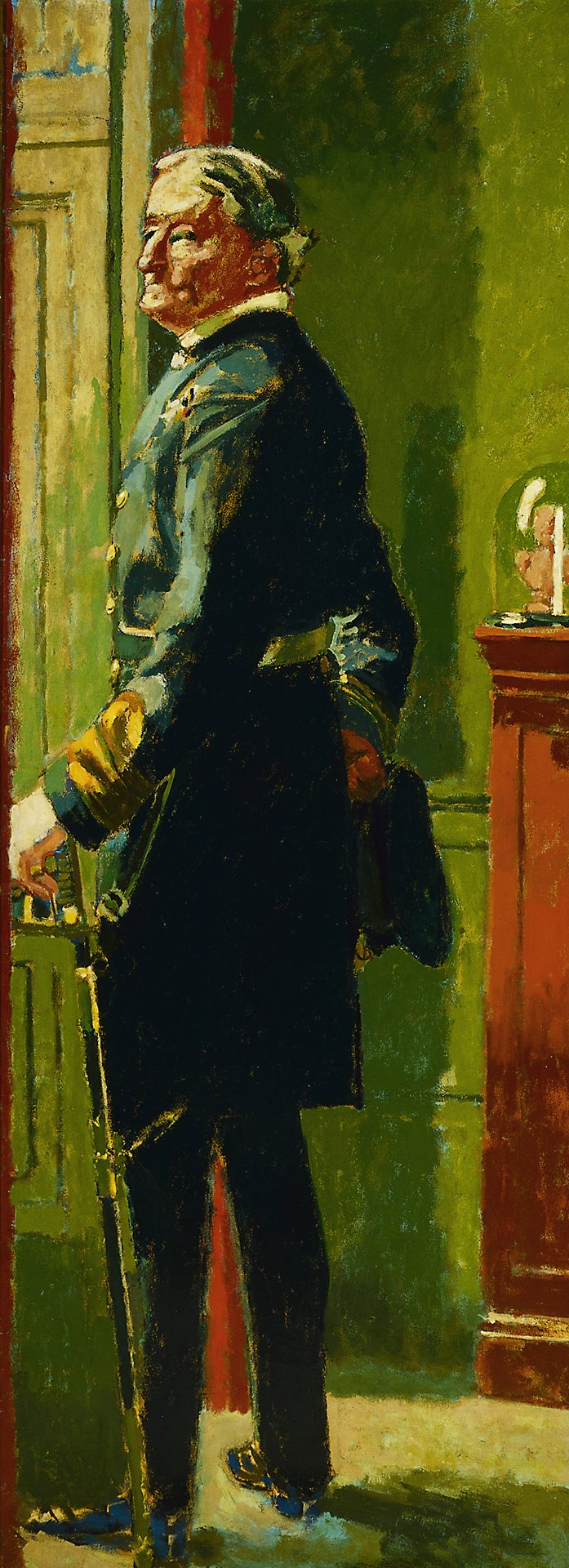
Portrait of Rear Admiral Walter Lumsden

Rear-Admiral Walter Lumsden, CIE, CVO (16 April 1865 – 22 November 1947) was a Royal Navy and Royal Indian Marine officer. He was Director of the Royal Indian Marine from 1909 to 1917.

The son of Colonel Henry Lumsden, of Pitcaple Castle, Aberdeenshire, Walter Lumsden joined the Royal Navy in 1880 and served on HMS Invincible during the bombardment of Alexandria in 1882, where he was slightly wounded. He retired from the Royal Navy in 1909 in order to take up the directorship of the Royal Indian Marine.

In retirement, he returned to Scotland, where he had succeeded to the family estate in Pitcaple in 1918. Lumsden was also a deputy lieutenant of Aberdeenshire.
