= Victor Mackenzie =

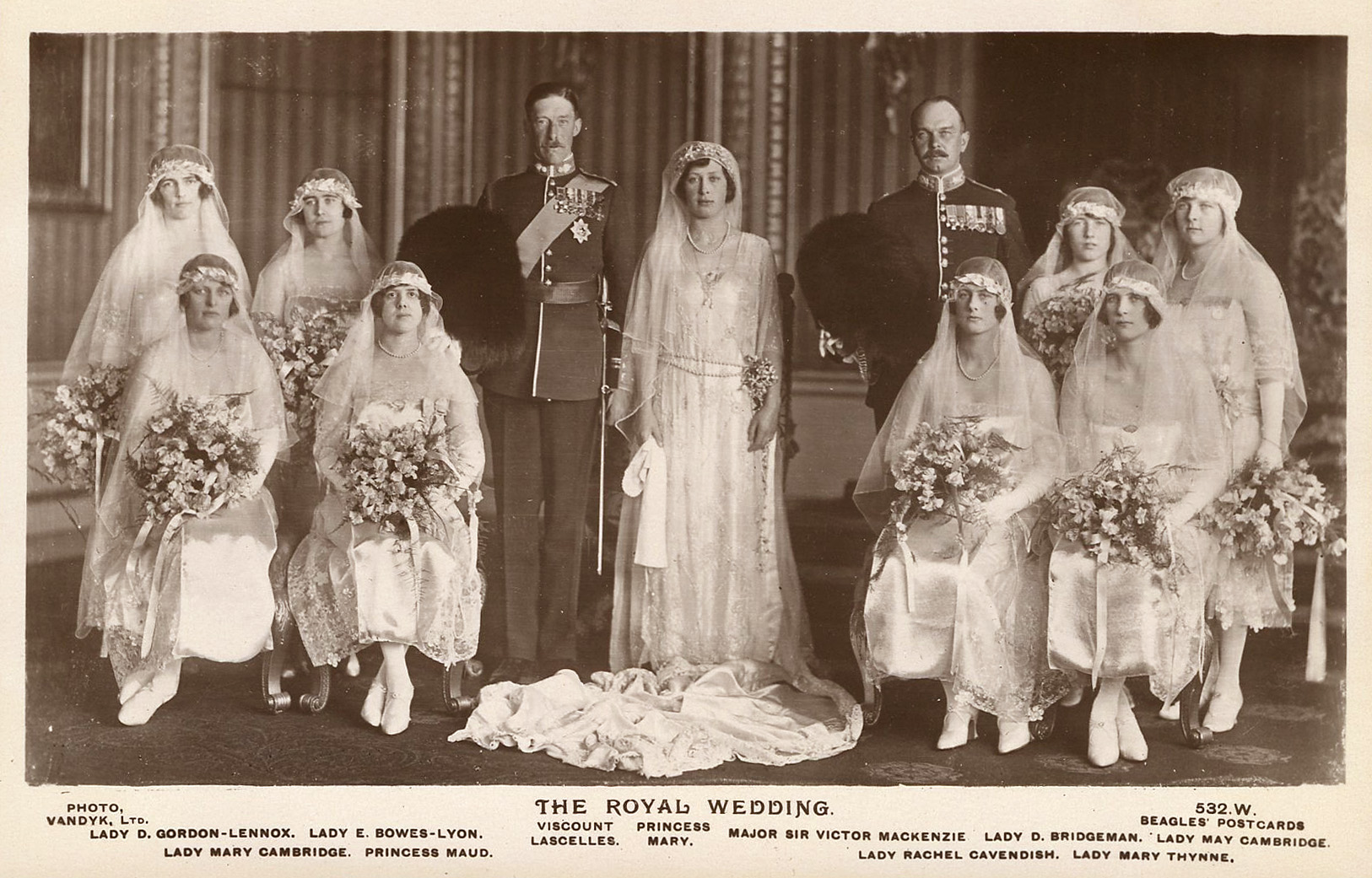
Mackenzie (back row third from right) as best man at the wedding of Princess Mary and Viscount Lascelles, 1922

Colonel Sir Victor Audley Falconer Mackenzie, 3rd Baronet DSO MVO DL (15 December 1882 – 18 April 1944) was a British Army officer, baronet and courtier.

He was the son of Sir Allan Russell Mackenzie, 2nd Baronet and Lucy Eleanora Davidson. After attending the Royal Military College, Sandhurst he was commissioned into the Scots Guards, being promoted to lieutenant in 1902. On 19 August 1906 he succeeded to his father's baronetcy, and he was made a Member of the Royal Victorian Order (5th Class) in the same year. He saw active service in the First World War, during which he was mentioned in dispatches and was wounded twice. In 1916 Mackenzie was awarded the Distinguished Service Order for his service in the war.

In 1920 he was awarded with the Medalla de la Solidaridad (3rd Class) by the government of Panama. In 1922 he acted as best man to Viscount Lascelles in his wedding to Princess Mary. Between 1930 and 1932 he was commander of the 153rd Infantry Brigade. In 1932 he was made Groom in Waiting to George V, serving in the role until 1936. In 1936 he was an Extra Groom in Waiting to Edward VIII, and retained the position in the household of George VI from 1937 until his death in 1944. In 1937 he was made a Deputy Lieutenant of Aberdeenshire.

Baronetage of the United Kingdom
Preceded by Allan Mackenzie	Baronet (of Glen Muick); 1906–1944	Succeeded by Allan Mackenzie
