= Fraserburgh =

Town in Aberdeenshire, Scotland

Coordinates: 57.693°N 2.005°W

Fraserburgh: Scottish Gaelic: Baile nam Frisealach; Scots: The Broch
- Town
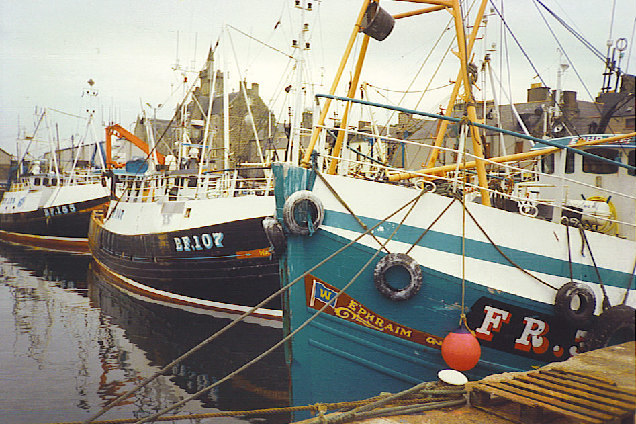

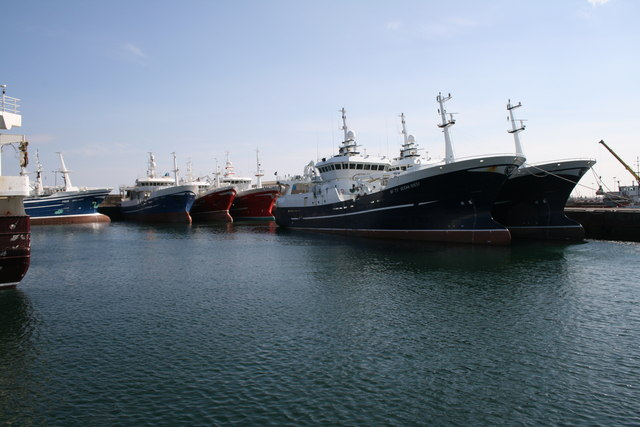
- Fishing boats in Fraserburgh harbour

- Location within Aberdeenshire
- Population: 12,921 (2022)
- OS grid reference: NJ997670
  - Edinburgh: 128 mi (206 km)
  - London: 434 mi (698 km)
- Council area: Aberdeenshire
- Lieutenancy area: Aberdeenshire
- Country: Scotland
- Sovereign state: United Kingdom
- Post town: FRASERBURGH
- Postcode district: AB43
- Dialling code: 01346
- Police: Scotland
- Fire: Scottish
- Ambulance: Scottish
- UK Parliament: Aberdeenshire North and Moray East
- Scottish Parliament: Banffshire and Buchan Coast
- Website: visitfraserburgh.com

Fraserburgh (/ˈfreɪzərbərə/; Scottish Gaelic: Baile nam Frisealach), locally known as the Broch, is a town in Aberdeenshire, Scotland, with a population recorded in the 2022 census as 12,921. It lies in Buchan in the northeastern corner of the county, about 40 miles (64 km) north of Aberdeen and 17 miles (27 km) north of Peterhead. It is the biggest shellfish port in Scotland and one of the largest in Europe, landing over 5,450 tonnes (5,360 long tons; 6,010 short tons) in 2016. Fraserburgh is also a major port for white and pelagic fish.

== History ==
=== 16th and 17th century: Origins ===
The town takes its name from the Fraser family, who bought the lands of Philorth in 1504 and brought about major improvements in the area over the next century.

By 1570, the Fraser family had built Fraserburgh Castle at Kinnaird Head and within a year a church was built for the area. Sir Alexander Fraser built a port in the town in 1579, obtained a charter establishing it as a burgh of barony in 1588 and secured the right to change the name from Faithlie to Fraserburgh in 1592.

A grant from the Parliament of Scotland in 1595 allowed Sir Alexander Fraser to erect the town's first college building, and in 1597 the General Assembly of the Church of Scotland recommended the Rev. Charles Ferme, then minister at the Old Parish, to be its first and only principal.

In 1601, Fraserburgh became a burgh of regality. The college, however, closed only a decade or so after Ferme's arrest on the orders of James VI for taking part in the 1605 General Assembly of Aberdeen, being used again only for a short time in 1647 when King's College, Aberdeen temporarily relocated owing to an outbreak of plague. A plaque commemorating the university's existence may be seen at the Fraserburgh Heritage Centre.

=== 18th and 19th century: Further growth and development ===
During the 18th and 19th centuries the population of Fraserburgh was growing with peaks due to seasonal employment. From a population of an estimated 1682 in 1755, a population of about 2,000 was recorded in 1780, of whom 1,000 resided in the town proper. There were a further 200 people in the village of Broadsea.

In 1787, Fraserburgh Castle was converted to Kinnaird Head Lighthouse, Scotland's first mainland lighthouse and the first in Scotland to be lit by the Commissioners of Northern Lights.

In the 1790s, Rev. Alexander Simpson of the Fraserburgh Old Parish Church described the harbour as "small but good", writing that it had the capability to take vessels with "200 tons burden". The Reverend noted that shipbuilding had become the main industry in the town, especially after 1784, and that the locals were making donations and seeking government assistance to have the harbour enlarged.

In 1803, the original 1571 church building was replaced and enlarged, to a design by Alexander Morrice, to seat 1,000 people. The Auld Kirk was to be the standing authority in the town up until the 1840s. This period also saw the extension of the harbour, with a northern pier of 300 yards (270 m; 900 ft) being built between 1807–1812 and, in 1818, a southern pier being built following an act of Parliament.

Fraserburgh's population boomed in the early 19th century, from 2271 in 1811 to 2954 by 1831. This was primarily put down to the growth in herring fishing, which intensified in 1815. The herring season also brought with it an additional 1,200 people working in the Parish. Contemporary accounts mention the increase in general wealth brought by this increased trade spurring a change in dress and diet as well as a considerable amount of new houses being built in the town.

No less than £30,000 was spent developing the harbour between 1807 and 1840 by which time the harbour held eight vessels of 45–155 long tons (46–157 tonnes) and 220 boats of the herring fishery.

Fraserburgh Town House, which was designed by Thomas Mackenzie of Matthews and MacKenzie, was completed in 1855.

Reporting on Fraserburgh in 1913, the Annual Report of the Fishery Board states: "An increase of 11 steam drifters. Fishermen and all others interested in herring curing have had a remarkably prosperous year."". At this time Fraserburgh, Peterhead, Wick and Aberdeen accounted for 89% of the East Coast catch.

Fishery Statistics

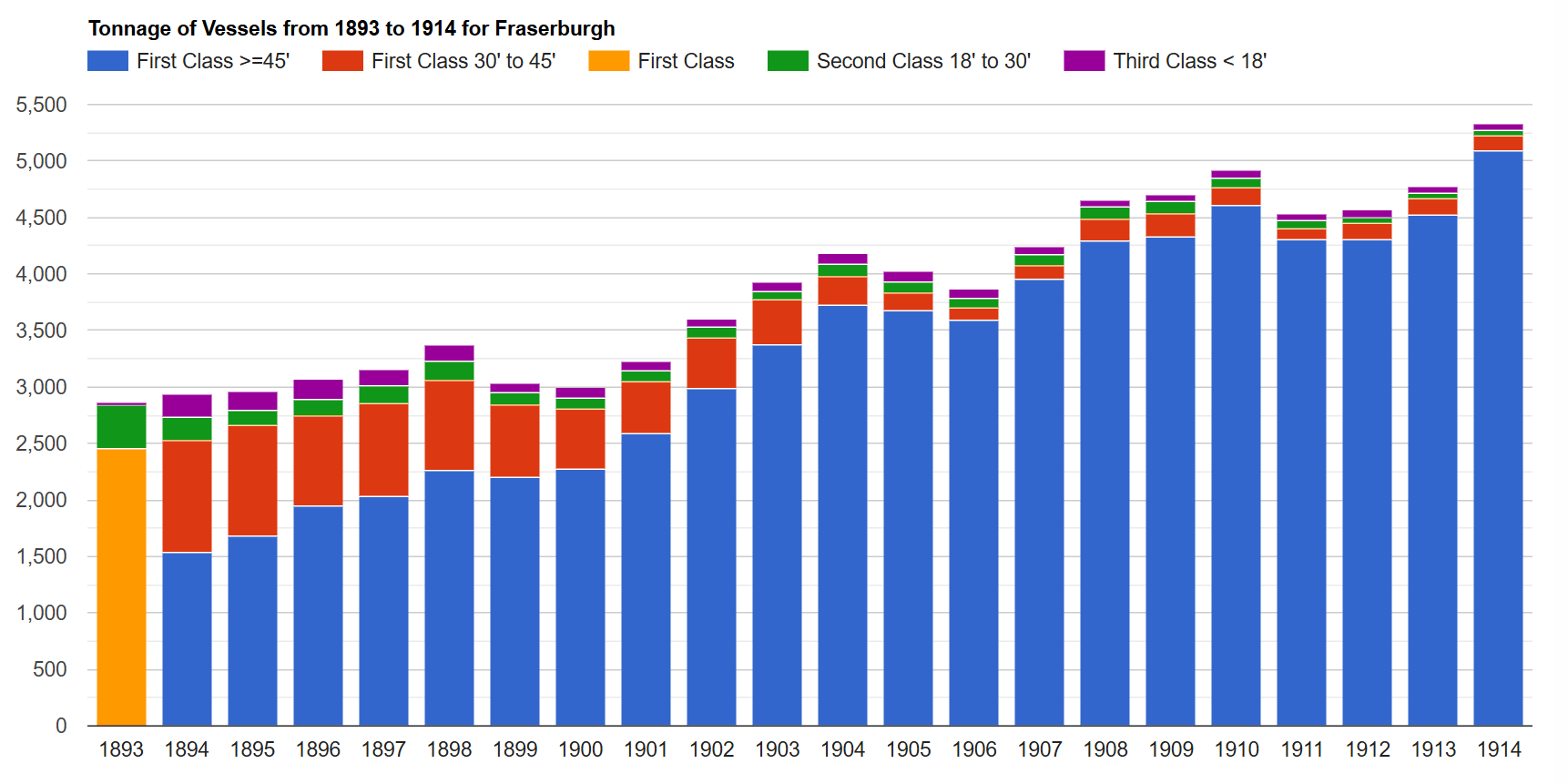
Tonnage of vessels

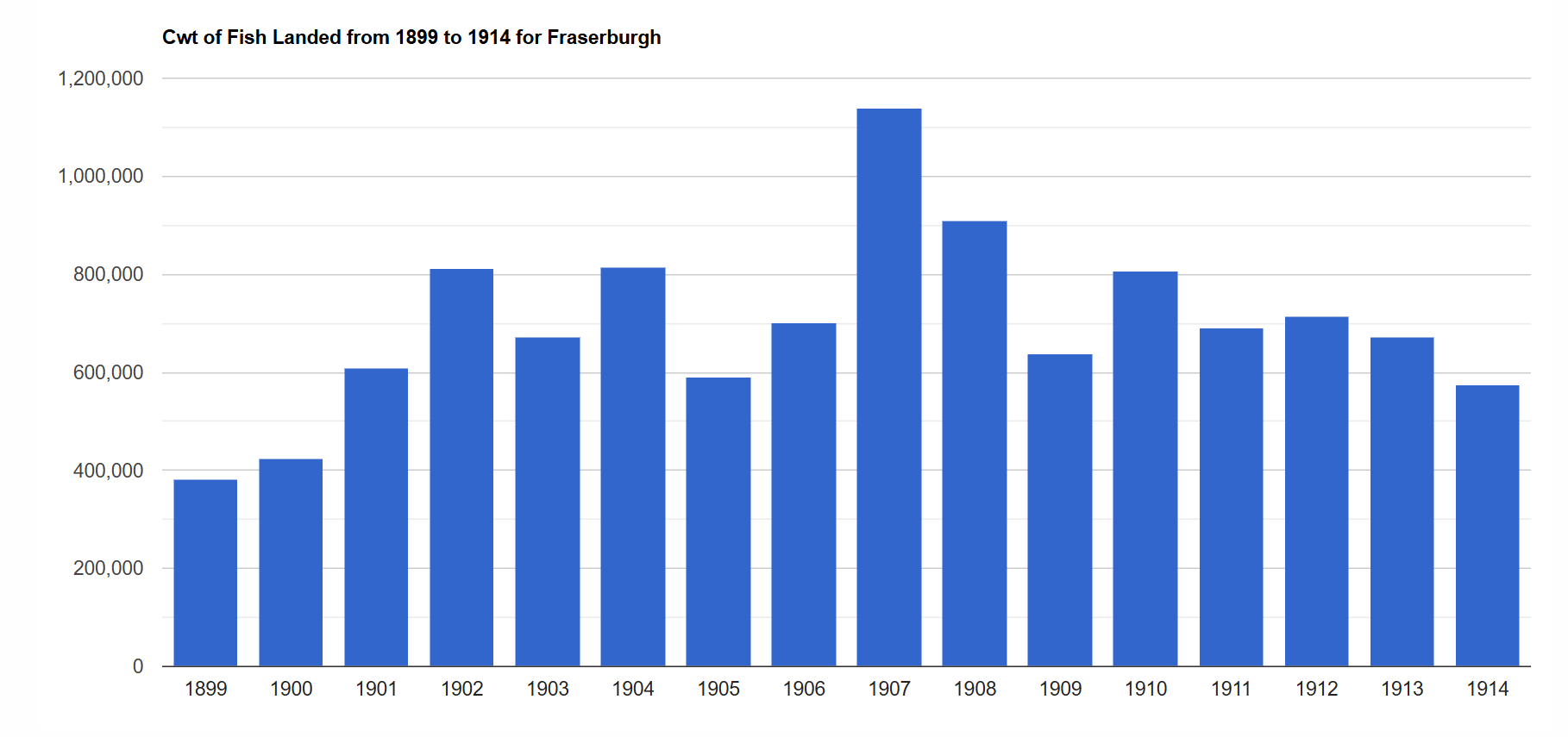
Cwt of fish landed

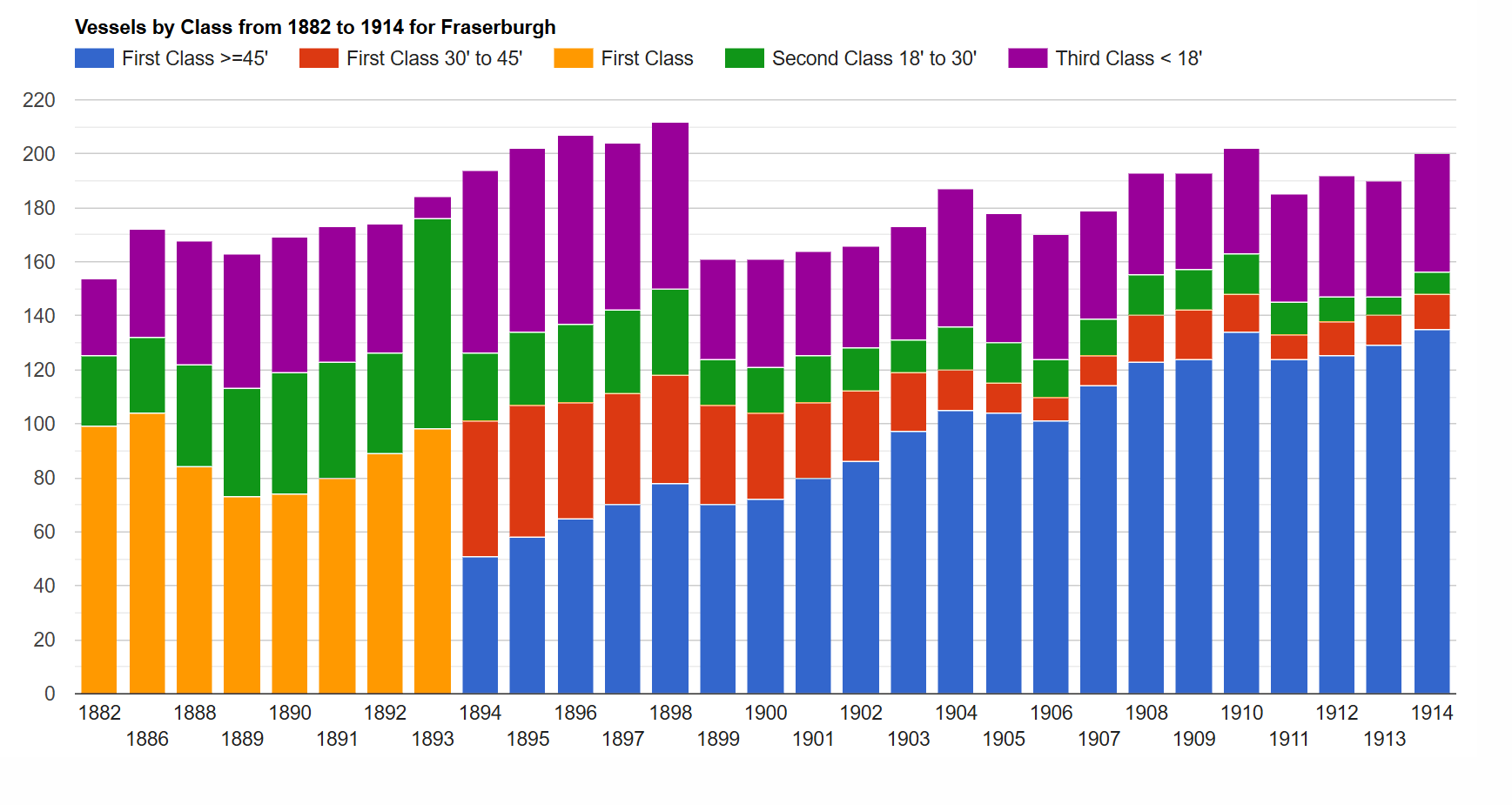
Vessels by class

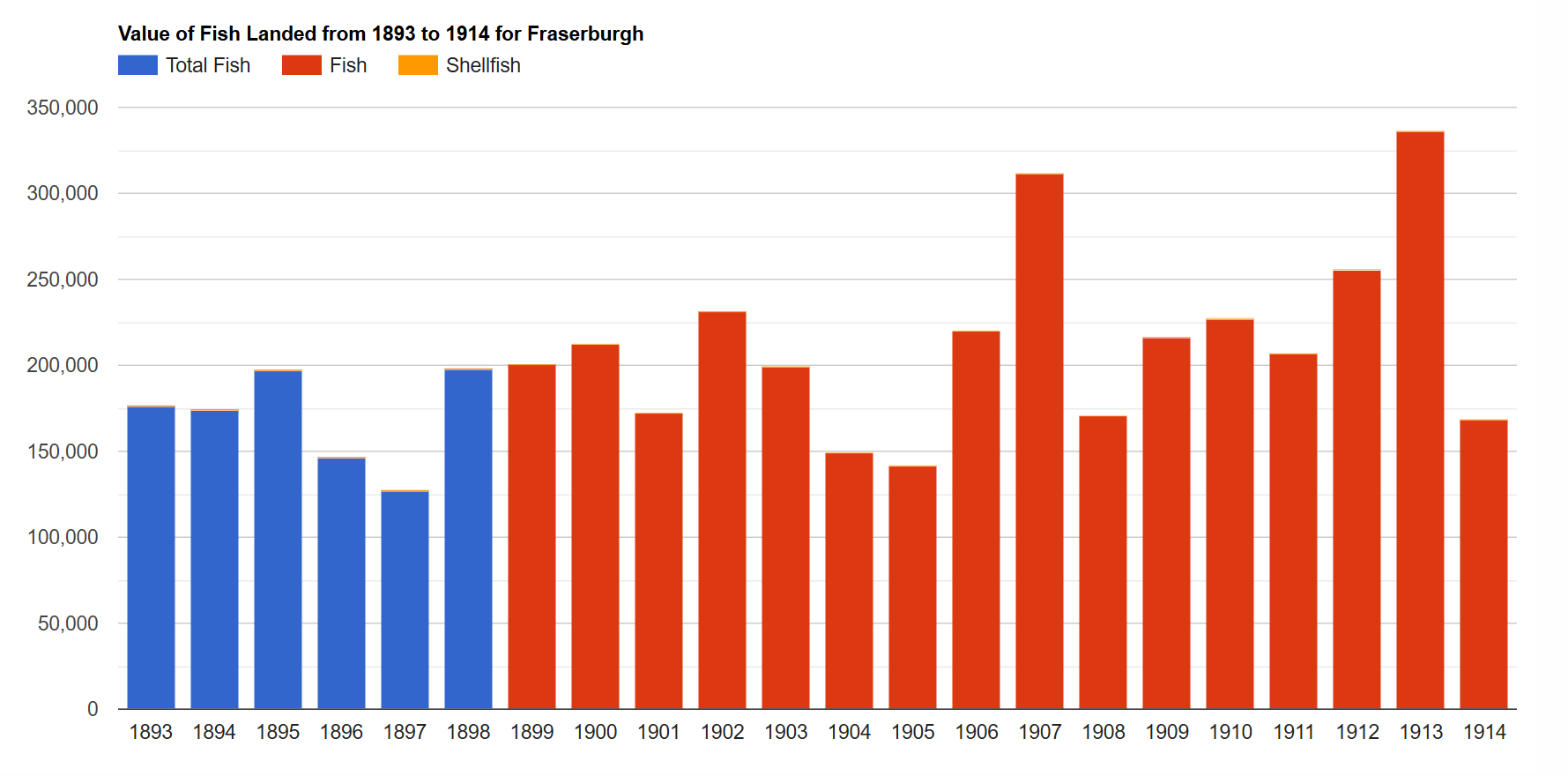
Value (£) of fish landed

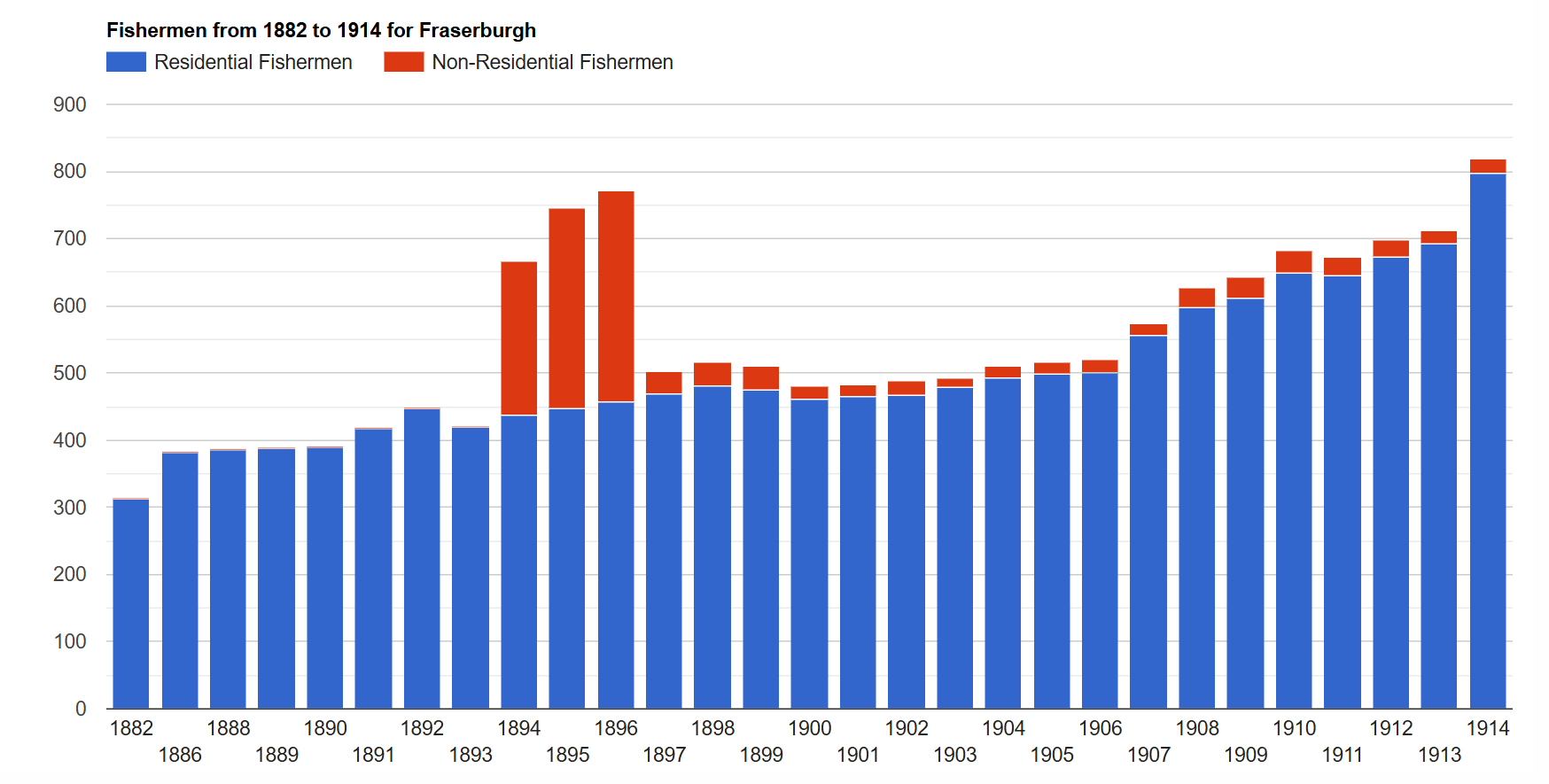
Fishermen

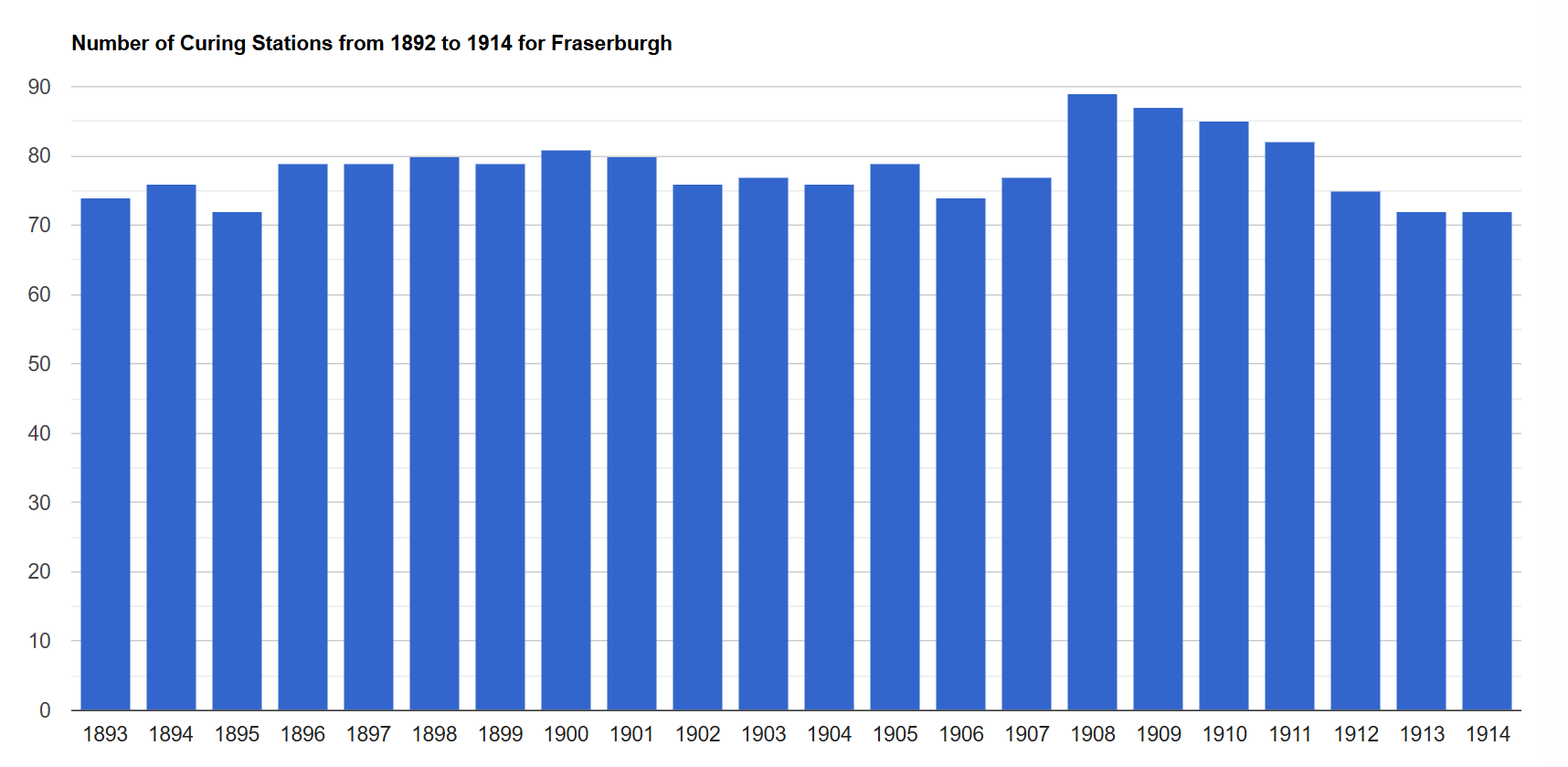
Number of curing stations

=== Lifeboat service ===
The town has had a local lifeboat on service since 1806 which was run privately by the local Harbour Board until the first RNLI operated station opened in 1858. This was the first official RNLI station opened in Scotland.

Throughout the 20th century, Fraserburgh suffered three lifeboat disasters. First, in 1919, the 'Lady Rothes' capsized while assisting HM drifter Eminent. Coxswain Andrew Noble and Acting Second Coxswain Andrew Faquhar drowned. Second, on 9 February 1953, six crew members lost their lives when the lifeboat capsized while escorting fishing vessels to the harbour. On this occasion Coxswain Andrew Ritchie, Mechanic George Duthie, Bowman Charles Tait, Assistant Mechanic James Noble and Crew Members John Crawford and John Buchan all lost their lives - the only survivor was Charles Tait. Lastly, on 21 January 1970 while on service to the Danish fishing vessel Opal, the lifeboat The Duchess of Kent capsized with the loss of five of her crew of six. Those killed were Coxswain John Stephen, Mechanic Frederick Kirkness and crew members William Hadden, James R.S. Buchan and James Buchan.

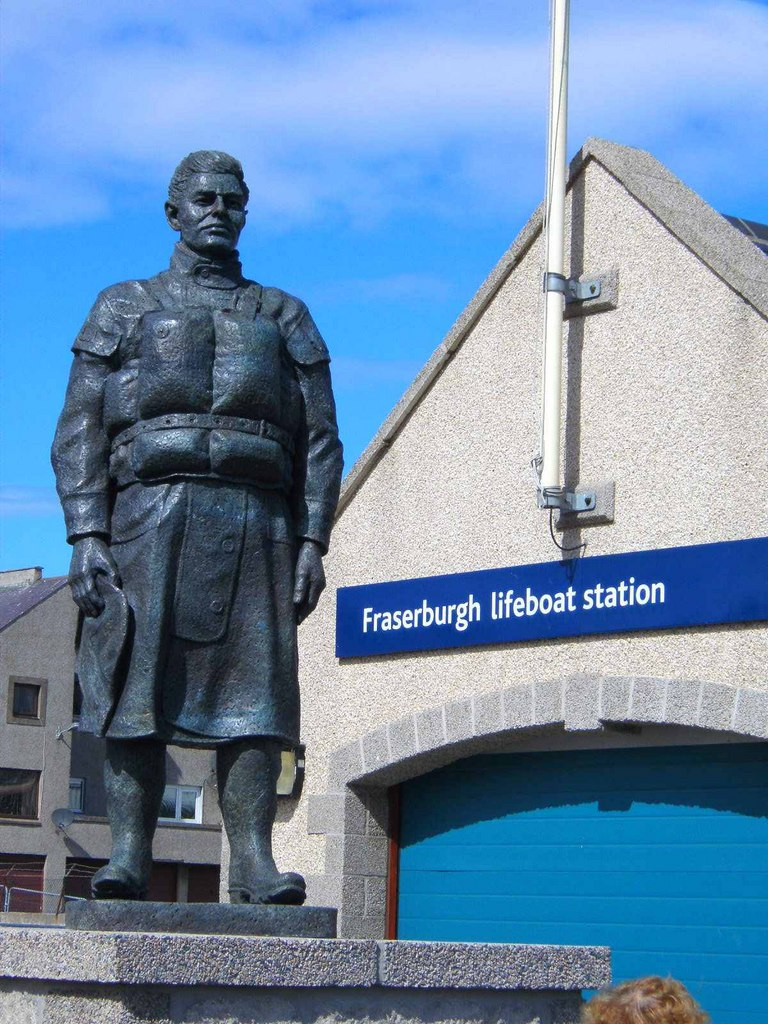
Fraserburgh Lifeboat Memorial - geograph.org.uk - 2026024

In 2009, a local campaign was started to raise £40,000 to erect an official monument to the 14 men who lost their lives whilst serving on the Fraserburgh Lifeboat. The target was successfully achieved and the monument unveiled by Flora Fraser, 21st Lady Saltoun in August 2010.

=== Railways ===
Fraserburgh railway station opened in 1865 and closed to passengers in 1965. The railway line was built by the Formartine and Buchan Railway Company, which became part of the Great North of Scotland Railway. Trains operated to Aberdeen via Maud and Dyce, as well as a short branch line to St Combs via Cairnbulg.

In 1923, the GNSR was incorporated into the London and North Eastern Railway, which was in turn nationalised on 1 January 1948. Passenger services on the Buchan lines were withdrawn in 1965 as part of the Beeching cuts, although freight trains continued to operate Fraserburgh until 1979. The track was subsequently lifted.

Following the opening of the Borders Railway in September 2015, Fraserburgh became the most distant town in UK from the rail network, leading to calls for the lifted track to be reinstated. The nearest operating station is currently Inverurie, 35 miles (56 km) away.

== Climate ==
Fraserburgh has a marine climate heavily influenced by its proximity to the sea. As such, summer highs and winter lows are heavily moderated, with mild winter temperatures for a location so far north. The differences between seasons are narrow as a result, with January and February averaging highs of 7.1 °C (44.8 °F) and August 17.2 °C (63.0 °F).

As a result of its marine influence, there is significant seasonal lag, with September being milder than June, and October having slightly milder nights than May, in spite of a considerable difference in the length of daylight. The climate is overcast and wet with an average of 1,401 hours of sunshine per year. Temperature extremes have ranged from 26.6 °C (79.9 °F) in July 1995 to −14.8 °C (5.4 °F) in February 1991. There is approximately 759.8 mm (29.91 in) of precipitation per annum.

Fraserburgh is also notable for having the highest ever recorded wind speed in the UK at a low altitude. The 142 mph (229 km/h) gust was recorded on 13 February 1989 at Kinnaird Head Lighthouse. The corresponding hourly mean speed was 78 mph (126 km/h).

Climate data for Fraserburgh (14 m asl, averages 1991–2020)
| Month | Jan | Feb | Mar | Apr | May | Jun | Jul | Aug | Sep | Oct | Nov | Dec | Year |
|---|---|---|---|---|---|---|---|---|---|---|---|---|---|
| Record high °C (°F) | 13.5 (56.3) | 14.0 (57.2) | 14.8 (58.6) | 22.1 (71.8) | 23.6 (74.5) | 24.4 (75.9) | 26.0 (78.8) | 25.5 (77.9) | 24.0 (75.2) | 21.3 (70.3) | 16.5 (61.7) | 14.4 (57.9) | 26.0 (78.8) |
| Mean daily maximum °C (°F) | 7.1 (44.8) | 7.1 (44.8) | 8.6 (47.5) | 10.3 (50.5) | 12.7 (54.9) | 14.7 (58.5) | 17.1 (62.8) | 17.2 (63.0) | 15.3 (59.5) | 12.5 (54.5) | 9.6 (49.3) | 7.5 (45.5) | 11.7 (53.1) |
| Daily mean °C (°F) | 4.9 (40.8) | 4.8 (40.6) | 5.6 (42.1) | 7.4 (45.3) | 9.7 (49.5) | 11.9 (53.4) | 14.1 (57.4) | 14.3 (57.7) | 12.5 (54.5) | 9.9 (49.8) | 7.2 (45.0) | 5.4 (41.7) | 9.0 (48.2) |
| Mean daily minimum °C (°F) | 2.7 (36.9) | 2.4 (36.3) | 2.7 (36.9) | 4.5 (40.1) | 6.6 (43.9) | 9.2 (48.6) | 11.1 (52.0) | 11.4 (52.5) | 9.6 (49.3) | 7.2 (45.0) | 4.7 (40.5) | 3.2 (37.8) | 6.3 (43.3) |
| Record low °C (°F) | −7.4 (18.7) | −5.4 (22.3) | −5.4 (22.3) | −4.5 (23.9) | 0.0 (32.0) | 0.5 (32.9) | 6.4 (43.5) | 5.6 (42.1) | −1.5 (29.3) | 0.1 (32.2) | −3.4 (25.9) | −5.4 (22.3) | −7.4 (18.7) |
| Average precipitation mm (inches) | 63.8 (2.51) | 54.6 (2.15) | 51.1 (2.01) | 58.4 (2.30) | 48.7 (1.92) | 51.0 (2.01) | 69.9 (2.75) | 55.8 (2.20) | 60.5 (2.38) | 87.9 (3.46) | 83.8 (3.30) | 74.3 (2.93) | 759.8 (29.91) |
| Average precipitation days (≥ 1.0 mm) | 14.0 | 11.0 | 11.9 | 10.3 | 10.0 | 7.7 | 10.6 | 11.0 | 12.4 | 13.3 | 14.9 | 14.7 | 141.8 |
| Mean monthly sunshine hours | 43.3 | 74.4 | 119.0 | 153.8 | 208.3 | 166.9 | 166.0 | 163.0 | 133.4 | 85.4 | 52.9 | 34.8 | 1,401 |
Source 1: Met Office (precipitation days 1981-2010)
Source 2: Starlings Roost Weather

== Demographics ==
The 2022 census recorded 12,921 residents making Fraserburgh the third largest settlement in Aberdeenshire after Peterhead and Inverurie. However, it was a slight decrease from the 2011 census. Since the accession of Poland and other eastern European countries to the European Union in 2004, there has been an influx of EU citizens to the town, with 5% of residents now speaking Polish as their first language, and a further 6% speaking other languages.

Some 10% of residents stated the Scots language to be their primary language used at home, whilst 63.1% reported being able to speak it.

== Places of interest ==
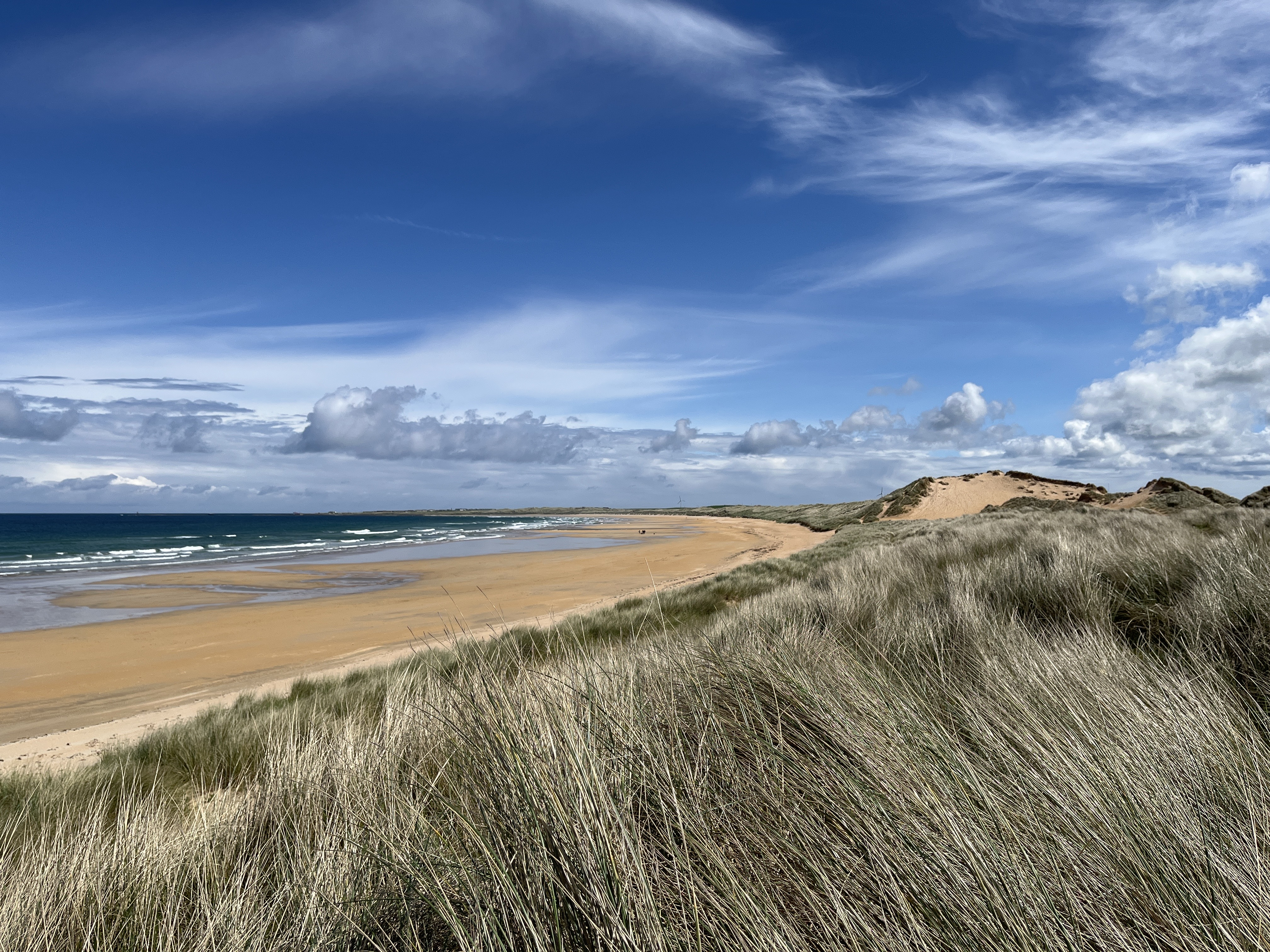
Fraserburgh Beach

The town has several attractions including an award-winning beach, a major commercial harbour, Kinnaird Head Lighthouse, the Museum of Scottish Lighthouses, Fraserburgh Heritage Centre, and the community war memorial by the Scottish sculptor Alexander Carrick.

Fraserburgh is home to a variety of 19th century churches, each in its own distinct style. This includes: Fraserburgh Baptist Church; Fraserburgh Old Parish Church (the oldest); Our Lady, Star of the Sea Roman Catholic Church; South Church; St Peter's Episcopal Church; and West Church.

== Sports and recreation ==
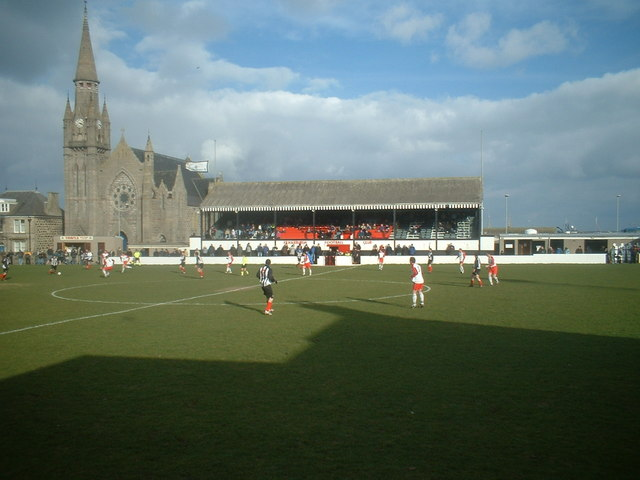
Bellslea Park

Fraserburgh has a number of sporting facilities including a swimming pool, ten-pin bowling alley, tennis courts, martial arts dojo, skatepark and football pitches.

=== Golf ===
Founded in 1777, Fraserburgh Golf Club is the fifth oldest club in Scotland and seventh oldest in the world. It has both an 18-hole and a 9-hole course, and a modern clubhouse. Nearby is the Dunes Golf Centre public driving range and cafe.

=== Football ===
Fraserburgh Football Club is a senior football club that plays in the Highland League, of which they became champions for the 4th time in April 2022. Fraserburgh United F.C. is a junior football club that plays in the Scottish Junior Football North First Division.

=== Cricket ===
Fraserburgh Cricket Club was founded in 1862 and currently competes in the Aberdeenshire Grades Leagues. They play their home matches at Kessock Park. The club celebrated their 150th anniversary in 2012 and in the same year succeeded in gaining promotion to Grade 2.

In 2013, the Club won the Bon Accord Cup for only the second time in their history with a victory over Knightriders CC. In 2014, Fraserburgh Cricket Club gained promotion to Grade 1 by finishing second in Grade 2, meaning that they would play in the top tier of the Aberdeenshire Grades for the first time since 1975.

The club were relegated to Grade 2 in 2015.

In 2018 the club won the Bon Accord Cup for a third time, in a re-vamp T20 competition, at Mannofield Cricket Ground, beating Gordonians.

== Media ==
=== Television ===
Television signals are received from the Durris TV transmitter and the local relay transmitter situated in Rosehearty.

=== Radio ===
Radio stations are BBC Radio Scotland on 93.1 FM, Greatest Hits Radio North East Scotland on DAB, MFR (formerly Kinnaird Radio) on 96.7 FM and Coast Radio, which will broadcast on 101.2 FM on the licence which was previously held by Waves Radio which ceased broadcasting in April 2023, launched on 25th April 2024.

=== Newspapers ===
The town is served by the local newspaper, The Fraserburgh Herald which is owned by The Scotsman.

== Transportation ==
=== Road ===
Fraserburgh is situated at the northern end of the A90 road. It is served by buses, including the Buchan Express to Aberdeen and a town service numbered 76 and 77.

=== Harbour ===
Fraserburgh is a major white fish port and busy commercial harbour. The harbour has a six berth slipway facility, storm gates, a large drydock, and fully refrigerated fish market facilities.

The Apostleship of the Sea, a seafarers charity, has a port chaplain in Fraserburgh.

== Education ==
The town has a variety of educational establishments, including four primary schools (Fraserburgh North School, Fraserburgh South Park School, Lochpots School, St Andrew's School), a secondary school (Fraserburgh Academy), a SEN school (Westfield School), and a campus of a college of further education (North East Scotland College).

=== Fraserburgh Academy ===
The original academy building was opened in 1909. A new, more modern, school was built in the 1950s, and the original building was repurposed to house the academy's art and drama departments.

In early 2009, a group of MPs from the Scottish Parliament held a petition committee meeting in the school. Also in early 2009, the art department of the school organised commemorate photo exhibition in memory of Glover's early years of living in Fraserburgh. These photos were displayed throughout the town, and some of the photos are being used as part of the Homecoming Scotland campaign. See article - Thomas Blake Glover

In September 2009, the school had a visit from the Poet Laureate Carol Ann Duffy who gave a speech to pupils from the school and others from the whole of Aberdeenshire.

== Religion ==
Christianity is the prevalent religion in Fraserburgh and it is home to many congregations from a wide variety of Christian denominations. This includes one united Church of Scotland congregation and four Pentecostal congregations (Elim Pentecostal, Assembly of God, Calvary Chapel and Emmanuel Christian Fellowship). Additionally, there are also congregations of Baptists, Roman Catholics, Scottish Episcopalians, Evangelists, Congregationalists, Brethren, Jehovah's Witnesses and Salvationists.

== Notable people ==
=== 16th century ===
- Rev. Charles Ferm (c. 1565–1617): born in Edinburgh; Minister of Fraserburgh Old Parish Church (1598–1617), Principal of the University of Fraserburgh. A notable rebel minister against Episcopacy.

=== 17th century ===
- Alexander Fraser, 11th Lord Saltoun (1604 – 1693): Scottish peer and the 10th Laird of Philorth.
- William Fraser, 12th Lord Saltoun (1654–1715): born in Philorth; voted against ratifying the Treaty of Union.

=== 18th century ===
- James Ramsay (1733–89): born in Fraserburgh; anti-slavery campaigner.
- General Sir John Fraser, (1760 – 1843): British Army officer.

=== 19th century ===
- Charles Rawden Maclean (1815–1880), alias "John Ross" opponent of slavery, was born in Fraserburgh.
- Patrick Gray Cheves (1820 –1883): a farmer in Norway, Wisconsin who served two terms as a member of the Wisconsin State Assembly from Racine County, Wisconsin.
- Sir William Henderson (1826 –1904) was a Scottish merchant, Lord Provost of Aberdeen, and philanthropist.
- Robertson Macaulay (1833–1915): one-time president of Sun Life Assurance Company of Canada.
- Christian Watt (1833–1923): author of "The Christian Watt Papers"
- Thomas Blake Glover (1838–1911): born in Fraserburgh, where his father worked for the coastguard, moved to Japan and assisted in the introduction of modern industries. He remained in the country as a consultant to the Mitsubishi Company and died in Tokyo, a legend in his time.
- Sir George Strahan (1838–87): British colonial governor.
- Colonel William McConnachie of Knowsie, (1848–1932): businessman, local politician and Provost of Fraserburgh.
- Ann Watt Milne (1856 – no earlier than 1928), temperance leader
- Major Harold J. Milne (1889–1963): Provost of Fraserburgh, First Freeman of the Burgh of Fraserburgh.
- George Fowlie Merson (1866–1959): Scottish pharmacist who produced an artificial surgical catgut called Mersuture.
- John Murray (1879 - 1964): Educationalist, Liberal Politician.
- Gordon Mitchell Forsyth (1879-1952): Fraserburgh born artist. Known mainly for his work in ceramics, he tutored many artists at the Burslem School of art including Clarice Cliff and Susie Cooper.
- Charles Jarvis (1881–1948): Recipient of the Victoria Cross.
- Finlay Kennedy (1892 - 1925): Scottish International Rugby Union Player.
- Archibald Russell Johnstone (known as Archie Johnstone) (1896 - 1963): Scottish journalist, hotelier and humanitarian, who defected to the Soviet Union.

=== 20th century ===
- George Bruce (1909–2002): Poet of the Scottish literary renaissance
- Walter Hamböck (1910-1979), musical director of the Fraserburgh Musical Society in the 1960, and Hitler's former pianist.
- James Cardno (1912 – 1975) was a Scottish bobsledder. He won the bronze medal in the four-man event at the 1936 Winter Olympics in Garmisch-Partenkirchen, Germany.
- William Cheyne (1912–1988) sometimes known as Andy Cheyne: was a Scottish footballer, playing for Rangers and Motherwell.
- John Christie (1929 – 2014): a football goalkeeper who played for Southampton F.C. for most of the 1950s.
- Bill Gibb (1943–1988): born near Fraserburgh; became international fashion designer.
- Patrick "Pat" King (1944-2022): a Scottish bassist, best known for his association with Manfred Mann's Earth Band.
- Dennis Nilsen (1945–2018): serial killer; born at Academy Road, Fraserburgh; committed his murders in London in the five years leading up to his arrest in 1983.
- Steve Fairnie (1951–1993): Fraserburgh born musician, painter, sculptor, actor, board game designer, chicken hypnotist, frontman of the post-punk band Writz and half of the Techno Twins.
- Sir Lewis Duthie Ritchie (born 1952) Born in Fraserburgh. Medical doctor and researcher, and James McKenzie Professor of General Practice at the University of Aberdeen.
- Duncan McLean (born 1964): writer and editor.
- Felicity Buchan (born 1970), Conservative MP for Kensington (2019-2024), investment banker.
- James Adams (born 1992/1993), Conservative MSP.
- Jamie Masson (born 1993): Scottish semi-professional footballer who has played for Aberdeen, Formartine United, Elgin City, Brechin City and other clubs.
- Craig Watson (born 1995): Scottish professional footballer who plays as a defender or midfielder for Airdrieonians.

== Twin towns ==
- Bressuire, France
