= William McConnachie =

British politician (1848–1932)

Colonel William McConnachie (10 March 1848 – 27 January 1932) was a Scottish businessman, and politician

He was born on 10 March 1848 in Dufftown, Scotland. After leaving school in 1864 he worked in wholesale and retail business, then started his own business in 1870 as shipbrokers and herring merchants, on Quarry Road, Fraserburgh, which grew to be one of the largest herring exporters in Scotland.

From 1874 he served in a number of positions on the town council, leading to his election as provost of Fraserburgh in July 1898, following the death of Provost Dickson. William also represented Fraserburgh on Aberdeenshire County Council and in 1890 became a justice of the peace for Aberdeenshire and a junior baillie, and from 1896 a senior baillie. Politically he was a Unionist.

In 1884 he also took command of H Company of the local rifle volunteers.

He was involved in the improvements to Fraserburgh harbour and in the successful petitioning to have Fraserburgh made a port of registry, separate from Peterhead. From 1899 he resided at Knowsie House, Lonmay.

He died at Knowsie House, Lonmay, in 1932 aged 84 years.
