= Walter Hamböck =

- Born: May 24, 1909; Vienna
- Died: March 17, 1979 (aged 69); Airdrie

Walter Hamböck was Hitler's pianist who emigrated to Scotland after the second world war. There he was a music teacher, church organist, and musical director of Fraserburgh Musical Society.

== Early life ==
Hamböck was born in Vienna, Austria, on 24 May 1909. He was a young musical prodigy. By the age of ten he was employed to play the piano during silent movies in his home city. In 1933–34 he won a grand piano as a prize for being placed third in an international piano competition in Geneva, representing Austria. The first prize was won by Ignacy Jan Paderewski a former prime minister of Poland, representing that country. Hamböck's performances began fill concert halls. He toured Europe, and gained fame for his performance of Beethoven's work.

== Association with Nazism ==
Hamböck moved to Berlin and, in 1936, was introduced to Adolf Hitler after one of his performances at the Kaiserhof, a hotel in Berlin where Hitler was sworn in as chancellor, was witnessed by Hermann Goering and Joseph Goebbels. two of Hitler's inner circle. Hambock had played at the wedding in 1935 of Goering and his wife, Emmy (Emma Sonnemann).

Hamböck was appointed Hitler's personal pianist. He later recalled "I played often in Hitler's company and in 1938 at the Reich Chancellery there was handed to me a diploma from the head of state himself. It conferred on me an honorary professorship for services to the reich." Hamböck also admitted that he had had in his library a copy of Hitler's Mein Kampf with a personal dedication, signed by Adolf Hitler, "To my young pianist friend."

In 1940 Hamböck accepted an invitation to perform a Liszt concerto with a Jewish conductor in the Netherlands. On his return, as he changed trains at Aachen, he was arrested by the Gestapo. He was taken to Berlin where he was confronted by Martin Bormann, deputising for Hitler. He pointed a pistol at Hamböck and said "You play for our Führer and then you play for a Jew!" Hambock was taken to Dachau concentration camp where he was interned, being made to wear a striped uniform with a red patch – a mark of political unreliability. In time he was moved to Flossenburg camp. His musical fame led to him becoming conductor of the camp orchestra, which led to his life being spared. In 1945 he escaped through the main gate of Flossenburg in a stolen SS officer's uniform. After release he suffered from pneumonia and was hospitalised. Eventually he made his way home, to find that his wife had remarried, assuming that he had died in captivity.

== Post-war life ==
Still in Berlin, Hamböck met and fell in love with Glasgow-born Helen Weir. He followed her back to Scotland where they married in 1962. They found a home in Strichen, Aberdeenshire, where Hamböck secured the position of organist at Strichen Parish Church. His salary was £48 per annum, and they were accommodated at the local manse. He brought to Scotland the grand piano which he had won thirty years earlier, and a blanket from the concentration camp. From the house in Strichen the couple ran a sheet-music publishing business, the Austro-Scotia Music Company in 1965, and was an associate member of the Performing Rights Society. He also became the musical director of Fraserburgh Musical Society. The Fraserburgh Herald and Northern Counties Advertiser reported that "The society has been fortunate in securing the services of Professor Walter Hambock of Strichen, the brilliant Austrian musician and teacher of music."

The couple later moved to Airdrie, Lanarkshire. where Hamböck taught piano to schoolchildren. One of his pupils was Neil Reid, who won Opportunity Knocks in 1972. Aged 12, he was the show's youngest ever winner.

It was reported in 1977 that Hambock had survived "three coronaries and a stroke". Hamböck died on 17 March 1979 in Airdrie.

Hamböck wrote his memoirs, Music Saved My Life, which remain unpublished.
