= Deputy lieutenant of Aberdeenshire =

British government officer

A deputy lieutenant of Aberdeenshire is commissioned by the Lord Lieutenant of Aberdeenshire.

The Lieutenancy Area of Aberdeenshire was previously known as the County of Aberdeen – not to be confused with the former County of the City of Aberdeen.

Deputy lieutenants support the work of the lord-lieutenant. There can be several deputy lieutenants at any time, depending on the population of the county. Their appointment does not terminate with the changing of the lord-lieutenant, but they usually retire at age 75.

== 19th century ==
- 30 June 1849: Francis Alexander Keith Falconer, Earl of Kintore
- 30 June 1849: Alexander Bannerman
- 30 June 1849: James Gordon
- 27 May 1861: Arthur Hamilton Gordon
- 27 May 1861: Colonel Charles Leslie
- 27 May 1861: Mountstuart Elphinstone Grant Duff
- 27 May 1861: Sir James Horn Burnett of Leys
- 27 May 1861: Francis Farquharson
- 27 May 1861: James Dyce Nicol
- 27 May 1861: Arthur Forbes Gordon
- 27 May 1861: Lieutenant-Colonel Henry Knight Erskine of Pittodrie
- 27 May 1861: Lord Lindsay
- 27 May 1861: John Gordon
- 22 September 1862: Thomas James
- 30 September 1864: Charles Gordon-Lennox, 6th Duke of Richmond
- 30 September 1864: The Earl of Aberdeen
- 30 September 1864: Lord Saltoun
- 30 September 1864: Major Charles Keith Falconer
- 30 September 1864: Sir Archibald Grant
- 30 September 1864: Sir William Forbes
- 30 September 1864: Colonel James Ross Farquharson
- 30 September 1864: John Ramsay
- 30 September 1864: James Forbes Leith
- 30 September 1864: John Gordon
- 26 April 1866: Sir William Coote Seton
- 26 April 1866: Henry Lumsden
- 26 April 1866: William Dingwall Fordyce
- 26 April 1866: John Paton Watson
- 26 April 1866: Charles John Forbes
- 26 April 1866: John Elphinstone Dalrymple
- 26 April 1866: Charles Leslie
- 26 April 1866: Frederick Fraser
- 7 December 1869: The Marquis of Huntly
- 7 December 1869: Lord Forbes
- 7 December 1869: Lieutenant-Colonel Ferguson
- 7 December 1869: B. C. Urquhart
- 7 December 1869: A. Forbes Irvine
- 7 December 1869: Colonel Forbes Leslie
- 7 December 1869: Carlos Pedro Gordon
- 7 December 1869: Robert O. Farquharson
- 7 December 1869: James Wilkinson Gordon
- 7 June 1876: Sir Robert John Abercromby
- 7 June 1876: William Leslie
- 7 June 1876: James George Ferguson Russell
- 7 June 1876: Henry Gordon
- 7 June 1876: Andrew Robertson
- 8 June 1876: Alexander Morison Gordon
- 21 November 1877: Alexander Fraser, Master of Saltoun
- 21 November 1877: Robert Farquharson
- 21 November 1877: Ainslie Douglas Ainslie
- 21 November 1877: Robert Grant
- 21 November 1877: William Ferguson
- 23 October 1878: Admiral Arthur Farquhar
- 26 September 1881: Sir Alexander Anderson, Knt.
- 26 September 1881: Sir Robert Burnett, Bart.
- 26 September 1881: Major Arthur Johnston Bannerman
- 26 September 1881: John Crombie, Esq.
- 26 September 1881: Alexander Henry Gordon, Esq.
- 26 September 1881: Henry Wolrige Gordon, Esq.
- 26 September 1881: George Arbuthnot Leslie, Esq.
- 26 September 1881: William Harry Lumsden, Esq.
- 26 September 1881: George Thompson, Esq.
- 26 September 1881: John Comrie Thomson, Esq.
- 26 September 1881: John Turner, Esq.
- 26 September 1881: John Henry Udny, Esq.
- 31 December 1889: Captain Harry Vesey Brooke
- 31 December 1889: William Alexander Brown
- 31 December 1889: Harry Gordon Fellowes-Gordon
- 31 December 1889: Atholl Monson Forbes
- 31 December 1889: Sir Charles Stewart Forbes
- 31 December 1889: Arthur John Lewis Gordon
- 31 December 1889: Sir Arthur Henry Grant
- 31 December 1889: Francis Robert Gregson
- 31 December 1889: George Hamilton
- 31 December 1889: Lieutenant-Colonel Alexander Chambers Hunter
- 31 December 1889: Lieutenant-Colonel William Ross King
- 31 December 1889: Major Thomas Leith
- 31 December 1889: Hugh Gordon Lumsden
- 31 December 1889: Lieutenant-General Sir Peter Stark Lumsden
- 31 December 1889: Colonel Frank Shirley Russell
- 20 December 1900: James Ferguson
- 20 December 1900: Hugh Mackay Gordon
- 20 December 1900: George Gordon, 2nd Marquess of Aberdeen and Temair (he later became Lord Lieutenant of Aberdeenshire)
- 20 December 1900: Walter Lumsden

== 20th century ==
- 30 January 1908: Baron Sempill
- 30 January 1908: Joseph Farquharson
- 11 December 1909: Colonel George Milne
- 11 December 1909: Colonel James Ogston
- 11 August 1921: Lieutenant-Colonel Alexander Haldane Farquharson
- 30 November 1925: Major Atholl Laurence Cunynghame, Baron Forbes
- 30 November 1925: Lieutenant-Colonel Garden Beauchamp Duff
- 18 October 1927: Thomas Coats, Baron Glentanar
- 18 October 1927: Lieutenant-Colonel Alexander James King
- 14 November 1930: Lieutenant General Sir John T. Burnett-Stuart
- 14 November 1930: Brigadier General John George Harry Hamilton
- 16 January 1932: Falconer Lewis Wallace
- 6 July 1933: Lieutenant-Colonel James William Ferguson
- 20 February 1936: Major Alexander Arthur Fraser, Baron Saltoun
- 4 October 1937: Colonel Sir Victor Audley Falconer Mackenzie
- 2 June 1938: Robert Bruce
- 25 November 1938: Captain Sir Alan McLean
- 1 April 1939: Major Alexander Robert Leith
- 26 June 1941: Colonel Robert James Burton Yates
- 26 February 1945: Captain John Steele Allan
- 26 February 1945: Colonel Sir Charles Malcolm Barclay-Harvey}
- 26 February 1945: Major Arthur Brooke
- 26 February 1945: Major John Beauchamp Gordon Duff
- 26 February 1945: Admiral Sir Charles Gordon Ramsey
- 18 March 1949: Rear-Admiral Henry Dalrymple Bridges
- 18 March 1949: Major David George Ian Alexander Gordon
- 18 March 1949: Frederick Martin
- 18 March 1949: Sir George Arthur Drostan Ogilvie-Forbes
- 18 March 1949: Lieutenant-Colonel Charles Henry Turner
- 7 March 1950: Lieutenant-Colonel William Lilburn
- 16 June 1953: Colonel Sir John Stewart Forbes,
- 9 April 1954: Captain Harold James Milne Provost of Fraserburgh 1950-56.
- 14 January 1961: Major George William Bruce
- 14 January 1961: Colonel David Peter Davidson
- 14 January 1961: Observer Lieutenant Henry Quentin Forbes Irvine
- 20 November 1963: Brigadier James Roderick, The Earl of Caithness
- 20 November 1963: Lieutenant-Colonel Patrick Walter Forbes of Corse
- 20 November 1963: Captain Robin Fogg Elliot
- 30 December 1966: Colonel Roger John Gary Fleming
- 30 December 1966: Lieutenant-Colonel Frank Weaver Jack
- 30 December 1966: Major Francis Charles Quentin Irvine of Barra and Straloch
- 30 December 1966: Captain James Malcolm Hay
- 30 December 1966: Colin Andrew Farquharson
- 30 August 1971: June Gordon, Marchioness of Aberdeen and Temair
- 30 August 1971: Captain Alexander Arthur Alfonso David Maule Ramsay of Mar
- 6 September 1973: Major Laurence Ronald Kington Fyffe
- 6 September 1973: Major James Scott Gray Munro
- 6 September 1973: Maitland Mackie
- 26 October 1984: Marion Patricia Campbell
- 26 October 1984: Marc Floyd Ellington
- 26 October 1984: Angus Durie Miller Farquharson
- 19 August 1988: Patricia Mary Godsman
- 19 August 1988: William James Ferguson
- 19 August 1988: Captain Simon Mark Arthur, Baron Glenarthur
- 12 September 1989: James Malcolm Marcus Humphrey of Dinnet
- 12 September 1989: Colonel Rodney Francis Maurice Windsor
- 11 July 1996: Nicola Barbara Bradford
- 11 July 1996: John Alexander Campbell Don
- 11 July 1996: Malcolm Nigel Forbes, Master of Forbes
- 11 July 1996: Bridget Rosemary Zilla Tuck
- 18 February 1998: Alexander Gordon, 7th Marquess of Aberdeen and Temair, Earl of Haddo

== 21st century ==
- 23 May 2001: Clare Judith Thorogood
- 23 May 2001: Richard Laurence Oliphant Fyffe
- 23 May 2001: David Romer Paton
- 22 May 2003: Joanna Clodagh Gordon, Marchioness of Aberdeen
- 20 April 2005: Dr Maitland Mackie
- 20 April 2005: Katharine Ingrid Mary Isabel Nicolson
- 20 April 2005: Major Michael Pilgrim Taitt
- 3 May 2013: John Douglas Fowlie
- 3 May 2013: Fiona Kennedy
- 3 May 2013: Miranda Jane McHardy
- 3 May 2013: Reverend Kenneth Ian Mackenzie
- 3 May 2013: Alexander Philip Manson
- 3 May 2013: Andrew Cameron Salvesen
- 20 August 2018: Jean Catherine Miller Haslam
- 20 August 2018: Rear Admiral Christopher John Hockley
- 20 August 2018: Major Grenville Archer Irvine-Fortescue
- 20 August 2018: Sarah Barbara Mackie
- 20 August 2018: Steven Alexander Mackison
