= Angus Farquharson of Finzean =

British pioneer in sustainable rural community development (1935–2018)

Sir Angus Durie Miller Farquharson of Finzean KCVO OBE CStJ DL (27 March 1935 – 10 January 2018) was a British pioneer in sustainable rural community development, and Lord Lieutenant of Aberdeenshire from 1998 to 2010.

== Career ==
He was commissioned as a Deputy Lieutenant of Aberdeenshire in 1984 and as Vice Lord-Lieutenant in 1987. He became a Commander of the Order of St John in 2009 having been an Officer of the Order since 2002. He was awarded the honour of OBE in 1995 for services to forestry and the community in Aberdeenshire, and upon his retirement as Lord-Lieutenant in 2010 was made a Knight Commander of the Royal Victorian Order.

He served on the Red Deer Commission from 1986 to 1992. He was an elder of the Church of Scotland from 1969 and served on the board of General Trustees from 1995 to 2006. From 2006, Sir Angus was a Director of the Scottish Traditional Skills Training Centre.

== Family ==
Born Angus Roderick Durie Miller, Sir Angus adopted the surname of Farquharson in 1961 upon his marriage to Alison Mary Farquharson of Finzean, daughter of William Marshall Farquharson-Lang CBE, the 14th Laird of Finzean. The couple had two sons and one daughter and resided on the Finzean Estate in Aberdeenshire.

== Death ==
Sir Angus died on 10 January 2018 at the age of 82.

Honorary titles
Preceded by Captain Colin Farquharson	Lord Lieutenant of Aberdeenshire; 1998–2010	Succeeded by James Ingleby
