= Sidney Greville =

British civil servant and courtier

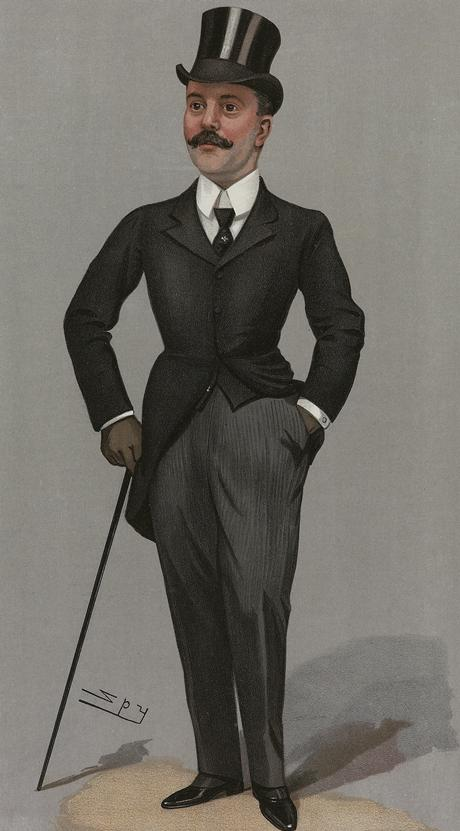
Greville caricatured in Vanity Fair.

Sir Sidney Robert Greville KCVO CB (16 November 1865 – 12 June 1927) was a British civil servant and courtier who held several appointments in the Royal Households of the United Kingdom.

Greville was a younger son of George Greville, 4th Earl of Warwick and Anne Charteris, and was educated at Marlborough College. He served as Assistant Private Secretary to the Under-Secretary of State for India in 1887 and as Private Secretary to Robert Cecil, 3rd Marquess of Salisbury when he was Prime Minister between 1888 and 1892 and from 1896 to 1898. Greville was then appointed Equerry to the Prince of Wales until 1901, when he became Groom in Waiting to Edward VII until the king's death in 1910. He was invested as a Companion of the Order of the Bath in 1899 and as a Commander of the Royal Victorian Order in 1901. He continued in the post under George V until 1920. He was invested as a Knight Commander of the Royal Victorian Order in the 1912 New Year Honours. Between 1901 and 1911 Greville worked as Private Secretary to Alexandra of Denmark and was Paymaster of the Household between 1911 and 1915. He was Comptroller and Treasurer to the Prince of Wales from 1915 to 1920, when he became Groom in Waiting to George V.

Greville received decorations from numerous foreign governments, including being a Commander of the Order of the Dannebrog, a Knight Commander of the Order of Franz Joseph, an Officer of the Legion of Honour and a 2nd class member of the Order of the Red Eagle.
