= Fraserburgh Old Parish Church =

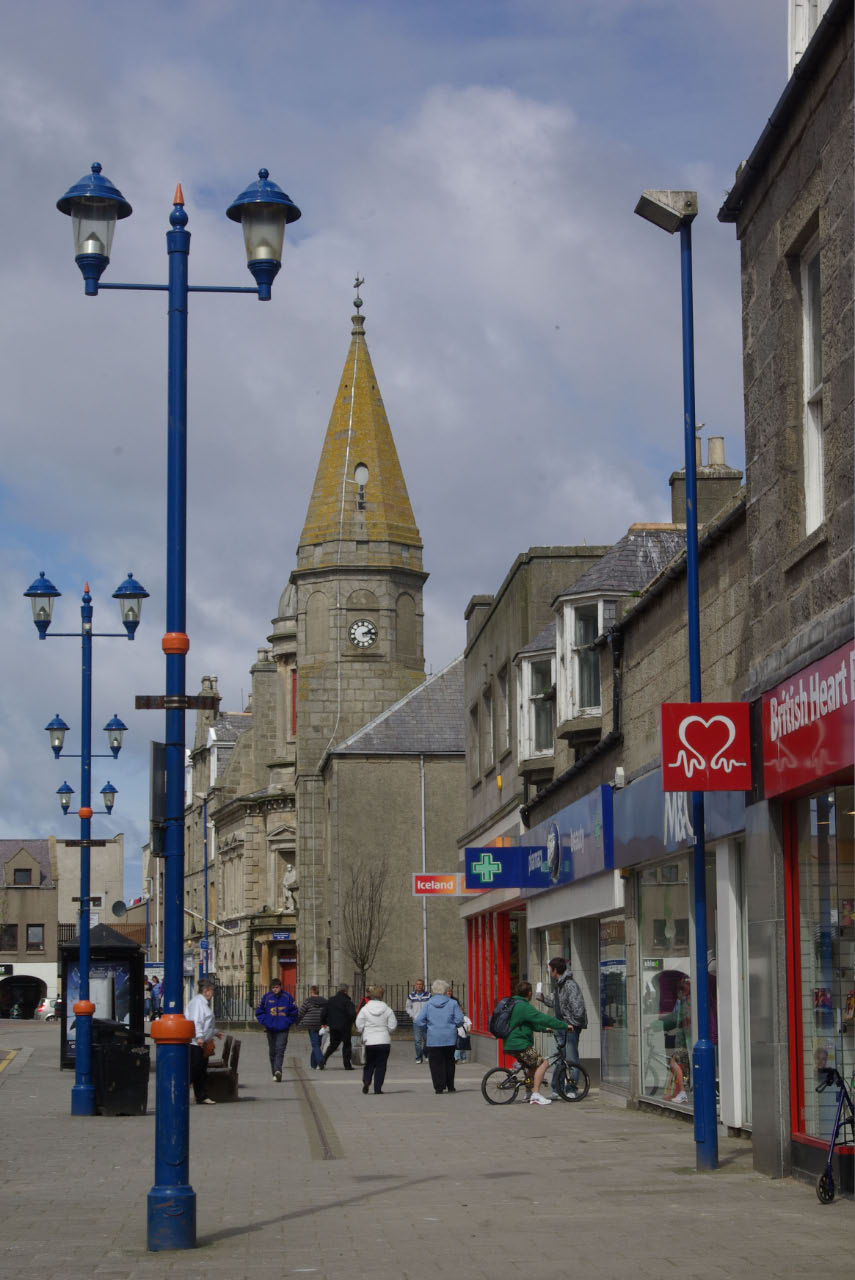

- Location within Aberdeenshire
- 57.694°N 2.009°W
- Location: Fraserburgh
- Country: Scotland
- Denomination: Church of Scotland
- Churchmanship: Reformed
- Website: www.fraserburgholdparishchurch.org.uk

History
- Founded: 1571

Administration
- Parish: Fraserburgh

Fraserburgh Old Parish Church was a congregation of the Church of Scotland in Fraserburgh, Aberdeenshire. The present building was erected in 1803 at the head of the High Street, on the site of a 16th-century church. The church is a category B listed building.

== History ==
The church was founded in 1571 in the village of Faithlie which was soon to be built up into the town of Fraserburgh by the local landowner, Sir Alexander Fraser. The church itself was the first new structure in the town, after the castle at Kinnaird Head.

=== Early troubles ===
From the building of the Kirk in 1571 until 1600, Scotland's official religion was Presbyterian, as a result of the Scottish Reformation of 1560. When King James VI introduced Episcopacy as the official religion in 1600, Fraserburgh had a devout Presbyterian in the pulpit. The Rev. Charles Ferm MA (c.1565–1617), was appointed to the Kirk in 1599 and rejected the King's new style of religious government. Instead he allied himself with the Rev. Andrew Melville (1545–1622), Rector of the University of St Andrews, who is remembered for calling James VI "God's silly vassal". On 2 July 1605, Ferme was one of the 14 ministers who attended the unauthorised General Assembly of Aberdeen. For his part in disobeying the King he was imprisoned in Doune Castle for a year. In 1607 he was summoned before the Privy Council, and was sentenced to confinement on the Isle of Bute, where he was imprisoned for nearly three years. He was restored to his parish in 1609, where he died in 1617. After his death, the Kirk slipped into the Episcopal form of Church Government.

Not much is recorded about the Kirk over the next century. Events seem abnormally quiet for the times which suggest that the Kirk had undergone a contented shift to Episcopacy by the 1640s. In 1684 the Lord Saltoun married off his grandson and heir, William Fraser, 12th Lord Saltoun, to Margaret Sharp, daughter of James Sharp, the Archbishop of St. Andrews who was charged with installing Episcopacy throughout Scotland. Lord Saltoun also appointed the ministers of the High Kirk.

=== Return to Presbyterianism ===
In 1689, after the Revolution of 1688, Presbyterianism was restored as Scotland's established church. Just as in 1600, Fraserburgh had the wrong kind of minister in the pulpit. Furthermore, the people of the town seemed to have no love for the Presbyterian form of Church Government. The Episcopal Minister was allowed to hold his charge until his death - as was agreed in the Scottish Constitution of 1688. The minister at the time, Rev. James Moore, continued his ministry until his death in 1703. His assistant, and son, Rev. Alexander Moore took over the charge in 1703 - an illegal move as far as the law was concerned. Officially the Kirk was declared vacant until 1706 when finally a willing Presbyterian minister (who was either brave or stupid) finally accepted the call. When the unfortunate representative of the Presbytery in 1706 came to declare and induct the new minister, the church was stormed and he was flung from the pulpit. After this event the Master of Saltoun petitioned the Presbytery demanding that the Rev. Moore be allowed to take the charge of Fraserburgh. This was rejected, and in 1707 the Rev. Alexander Auchinleck became the first Presbyterian minister of Fraserburgh in almost a century. Upon taking the Kirk, he found he held only half of the congregation that Moore held. Although the new minister built up the congregation throughout his 47-year ministry, the Episcopalians tried to storm and take the kirk on several occasions up until the 1740s. Since that shaky start to Presbyterian rule in 1707, it has survived to the present date.

=== 19th century ===
This was the last major upheaval that Fraserburgh Old Church experienced. Due to the riots caused in the Kirk in the 18th century, a new church building was erected on the site of the old building in 1802/3 in the ministry of Rev. Alexander Simpson. This building is in use to date, although the interior has been extensively renovated several times since. In 1843 Fraserburgh Old emerged relatively unscathed from the Disruption of the Church of Scotland. The minister at the time, Rev. John Cumming, seemed all set to join the schism but, to the surprise to most, stayed within the Established Church. He was an erratic character known to argue with anyone who would give him the opportunity. In 1852 he oversaw the deposition of one assistant, the Rev. John Lockhart, for "misconduct", and frequently bickered with his second assistant, Rev. John Storrie, until Cumming died in 1857 aged 85. In the 1860s, under the ministry of Rev. Peter McLaren, the Parish State in Fraserburgh branched out to extend education in the parish. McLaren is credited with the founding of no less than three new schools in the parish during his ministry.

It was during McLaren's ministry that the church peaked in both power and influence within the parish. No minister after McLaren was as influential or (arguably) controversial. His successor, Rev. Michael P. Johnstone, oversaw the renovation of the church to how it basically is today. In 1898 the new pipe organ was installed, and 1906 saw the dedication of the impressive Anderson memorial stained-glass window, designed by Douglas Strachan. He demitted office in 1919 due to ill health. His successor, Rev. W. Neil Sutherland, tried in his short ministry to boost congregation numbers by encouraging church social and youth groups. He was relatively successful, and in this pursuit purchased the "Penny Schoolie" as the Old Parish's church hall. Things continued relatively quiet under the next two charges with little to note. The church was almost destroyed during the Second World War. On one occasion a sheet of metal fell through the church roof during a bombing raid, slicing a small chip on the pulpit. To date this mark is referred to as "Hitler's mark" by the congregation.

=== Recent history ===
During the ministry of the late Rev. Douglas R. Clyne, much was done to expand the youth groups of the church. In his ministry the "Penny Schoolie" was renovated in 1976 for better accommodation, a new church centre built in 1990–92, and a special "Youth Dedication Service" has been held annually. Until its closure, the Old Parish Church hosted many youth groups including: the Badminton Club; Boys' Brigade (with band); Covenanters; Girls' Brigade; Junior Choir; as well as Sunday School groups. There were social groups for adults also.

The Rev. Clyne demitted office in 2004, and a three-year vacancy (under Rev. George S. Noble) ensued. Rev. Peter B. Park was inducted in November 2007 and oversaw the development of a hand bell group (The Clangers) which was founded in the last year of the Clyne ministry. Park was also a noted name at the 2009 General Assembly of the Church of Scotland when he openly opposed the appointment of the Rev. Scott Rennie - an openly gay minister and divorced father of one - stating, “There is a danger that we will make a decision [about homosexuality in the ministry] based on the prevailing culture of our time.’ He was defeated. The Rev. Park retired in June 2014 with no replacement appointed thereafter.

As part of the Church of Scotland's Presbytery Mission Planning in 2020's, the Presbytery of the North East and Northern Isles determined that, along with a number of other congregations in the wider Fraserburgh area, the closure of the building of Fraserburgh Old Parish Church should take place. It would involve a union with Fraserburgh West Church, Fraserburgh South Church, Rosehearty Church, Sandhaven Church, Iverallochy Church and Rathen Church to become Fraserburgh and District Church of Scotland. The buildings of Fraserburgh South, Rosehearty and Inverallochy would remain for worship and wider use.

By early 2026, it was listed on the Church of Scotland website for offers over £120,000.
