= Lord Lieutenant of Aberdeenshire =

Ceremonial officer in Aberdeenshire, Scotland

The Lord Lieutenant of Aberdeenshire, is the British monarch's personal representative in an area consisting of the county of Aberdeen as it existed immediately prior to abolition for local government purposes by the Local Government (Scotland) Act 1973 except that part within Aberdeen City council area.

The office was created on 6 May 1794.

== List of Lord Lieutenants of Aberdeenshire ==
- Alexander Gordon, 4th Duke of Gordon 17 March 1794 – 1808
- George Gordon, 5th Duke of Gordon 12 April 1808 – 28 May 1836
- William Hay, 18th Earl of Erroll 6 June 1836 – 19 April 1846
- George Hamilton-Gordon, 4th Earl of Aberdeen 21 April 1846 – 14 December 1860
- Charles Gordon, 10th Marquess of Huntly 13 February 1861 – 18 September 1863
- Francis Keith-Falconer, 8th Earl of Kintore 28 December 1863 – 18 July 1880
- John Hamilton-Gordon, 1st Marquess of Aberdeen and Temair 17 September 1880 – 7 March 1934
- George Gordon, 2nd Marquess of Aberdeen and Temair 11 May 1934 – 1959
- Sir Iain Forbes-Leith, 2nd Baronet 29 January 1959 – 17 March 1973
- David Gordon, 4th Marquess of Aberdeen and Temair 18 June 1973 – 13 September 1974
- Sir Maitland Mackie 11 February 1975 – 1987
- Capt. Colin Farquharson 13 May 1987 – 1998
- Sir Angus Farquharson 19 October 1998 – 2010
- James Ingleby 13 July 2010 – 20 March 2020
- Alexander Philip Manson 2 April 2020 – Present

== Notes and references ==
- Sainty, J. C. "Lieutenants and Lord-Lieutenants of Counties (Scotland) 1794-".
