= Sir Francis Seymour, 1st Baronet =

General Sir Francis Seymour GCB Bt
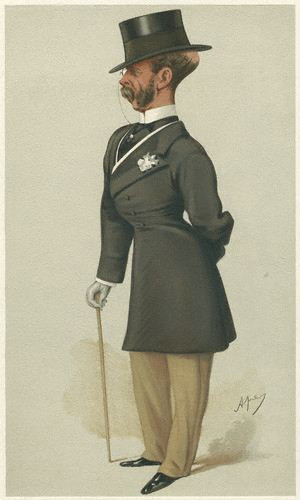
- "Albert's Seymour", as caricatured by Carlo Pellegrini in Vanity Fair, 1877
- Born: 2 August 1813 Lisburn, County Down, Ireland
- Died: 10 July 1890 (aged 76) Kensington Palace, London, England

General Sir Francis Seymour, 1st Baronet, GCB (2 August 1813 – 10 July 1890) was a British Army officer and courtier.

Born 2 August 1813, in Lisburn, County Down, Seymour was the eldest son of Henry Augustus Seymour (1771–1847) and his wife, Margaret (died 1867). In 1834, he was commissioned as an ensign in the 19th Regiment of Foot and promoted to lieutenant in 1837. At the request of Leopold I of Belgium, Seymour accompanied Prince Albert of Saxe-Coburg and Gotha on the latter's visit to Italy in the winter of 1838–1839. Following Albert's marriage to Queen Victoria in 1840, Seymour became his Groom-in-Waiting, an office he continued as such after Albert's death in 1861, to Victoria until 1876, when he became an Extra Groom-in-Waiting.

In 1840, Seymour was promoted to captain and exchanged to the Scots Fusilier Guards in 1842. In 1854, he served with the Guards in the Crimean War and was present at the battles of Alma, Balaclava, and Inkerman. He was wounded at Inkerman and later at the Siege of Sevastopol. In 1854, he was brevetted colonel and appointed a Companion of the Order of the Bath in 1857, having also received the Légion d'honneur (fourth class) and the Medjidie (fourth class).

Promoted to major in 1858, lieutenant-colonel in 1863, and major-general in 1864, Seymour was made a baronet in 1869 and went on to command the troops in Malta from 1872 to 1874. He was promoted to lieutenant-general in 1873, colonel of the 11th (North Devonshire) Regiment of Foot in 1874, Knight Commander of the Order of the Bath in 1875, and general in 1877. He was also appointed Master of the Ceremonies in 1876 and sometime appointed a Knight Grand Cross of the Saxe-Ernestine House Order. He retired in 1881 after being promoted to a Knight Grand Cross of the Order of the Bath that year.

On 25 August 1869, Seymour married Agnes Austin, the eldest daughter of H. D. Wickham, rector of Horsington, Somerset, and they had three daughters and one son, Albert Victor Francis Seymour, who was born when Seymour was seventy-four years old and who later served as a Page of Honour to Queen Victoria. Seymour died at Kensington Palace, London, on 10 July 1890. His baronetcy was inherited by his ten-year-old son.

Court offices
New office	Groom in Waiting to Prince Albert; 1840–1861	Death of Prince Albert
Preceded by Sir Henry Bentinck	Groom in Waiting in Ordinary; 1867–1876	Succeeded by Charles Lindsay
Preceded by Sir Edward Cust	Master of the Ceremonies; 1876 – 1890	Succeeded by Sir Christopher Teesdale
Baronetage of the United Kingdom
New creation	Baronet (of the Army); 1869–1890	Succeeded by Albert Seymour
