= George Liddell (cricketer) =

English cricketer

Personal information
- Full name: George Augustus Frederick Liddell
- Born: 28 July 1812; London, England
- Died: 14 December 1888 (aged 76); Eton, Berkshire, England

Domestic team information
- Years: Team
- 1844: Hampshire
- 1840–1841 & 1846–1851: Marylebone Cricket Club

Career statistics
Competition	FC
Matches	25
Runs scored	386
Batting average	9.41
100s/50s	–/1
Top score	52
Balls bowled	–
Wickets	–
Bowling average	–
5 wickets in innings	–
10 wickets in match	–
Best bowling	–
Catches/stumpings	6/–
- Source: Cricinfo, 1 May 2010

George Augustus Frederick Liddell (28 July 1812 – 14 December 1888) was an English cricketer. Liddell was the son of Thomas Liddell, 1st Baron Ravensworth. Educated at Eton College, Liddell later married Cecil Wellesley, daughter of Gerald Wellesley.

Liddell made his first-class debut for the Marylebone Cricket Club against the Cambridge Town Club in 1840. From 1840 to 1851, he played 18 first-class matches for the club; he scored 311 runs at a batting average of 11.10, with a single half century score of 52.

Liddell also represented Hampshire in a single first-class match in 1844, against the Marylebone Cricket Club. In addition to playing for the Marylebone Cricket Club and Hampshire, he also played first-class cricket for the Slow Bowlers (suggesting Liddell himself was a slow bowler), N Felix's XI, the Gentlemen of England and for England against Surrey in 1849.

In his overall first-class career he scored 386 runs at a batting average of 9.41, with a single half century score of 52. In the field he took 6 catches.

Liddell was also a watercolor artist.

Liddell died on 14 December 1888 at Eton, Berkshire.
