= List of cemeteries in Malaysia =

Here are the list of the cemeteries or graveyards in Malaysia

- Alor Gajah British Graveyard
- Bukit Kiara Muslim Cemetery
- Cheras Christian Cemetery
- Jalan Ampang Muslim Cemetery
- Kuala Lumpur Chinese Cemetery
- Labuan War Cemetery
- Old Protestant Cemetery, George Town
- Taiping War Cemetery
- Taman Selatan
- Tanjung Kupang Memorial
- Jasin Melaka Cemetery
