= Camp Terendak =

Malaysian army military base

- Kem Terendak
- Melaka Tengah / Alor Gajah district Near Sungai Udang, Malacca
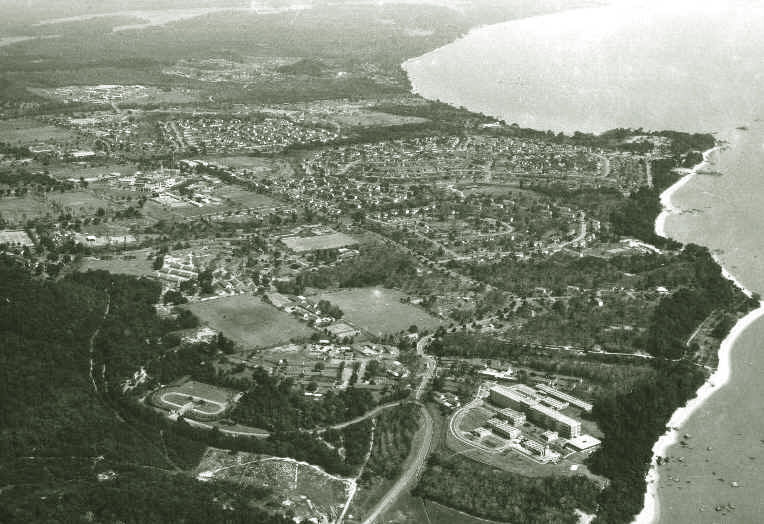
- Military aerial photography of the Camp Terendak and Camp Sungai Udang taken some time in 1963.

Site information
- Type: Military base
- Owner: Malaysian Ministry of Defence
- Controlled by: Malaysian Army
- Open to the public: Yes

Location
- Coordinates: 2.287213°N 102.09728°E

Site history
- Built: 1964
- In use: 1959–present

Garrison information
- Garrison: 3rd Infantry Division; 10th Parachute Brigade; 94 Armed Forces Hospital; 32nd Regiment, Royal Artillery

Airfield information
Runways
Direction	Length and surface
	570 metres (1,870 ft) dirt

Camp Terendak is a Malaysian Army military base located in Sungai Udang, Malacca, Malaysia. It belonged to the Commonwealth of Nations before being handed over to the Malaysian Armed Forces in 1970. It is right next to the Camp Sungai Udang.

== History ==
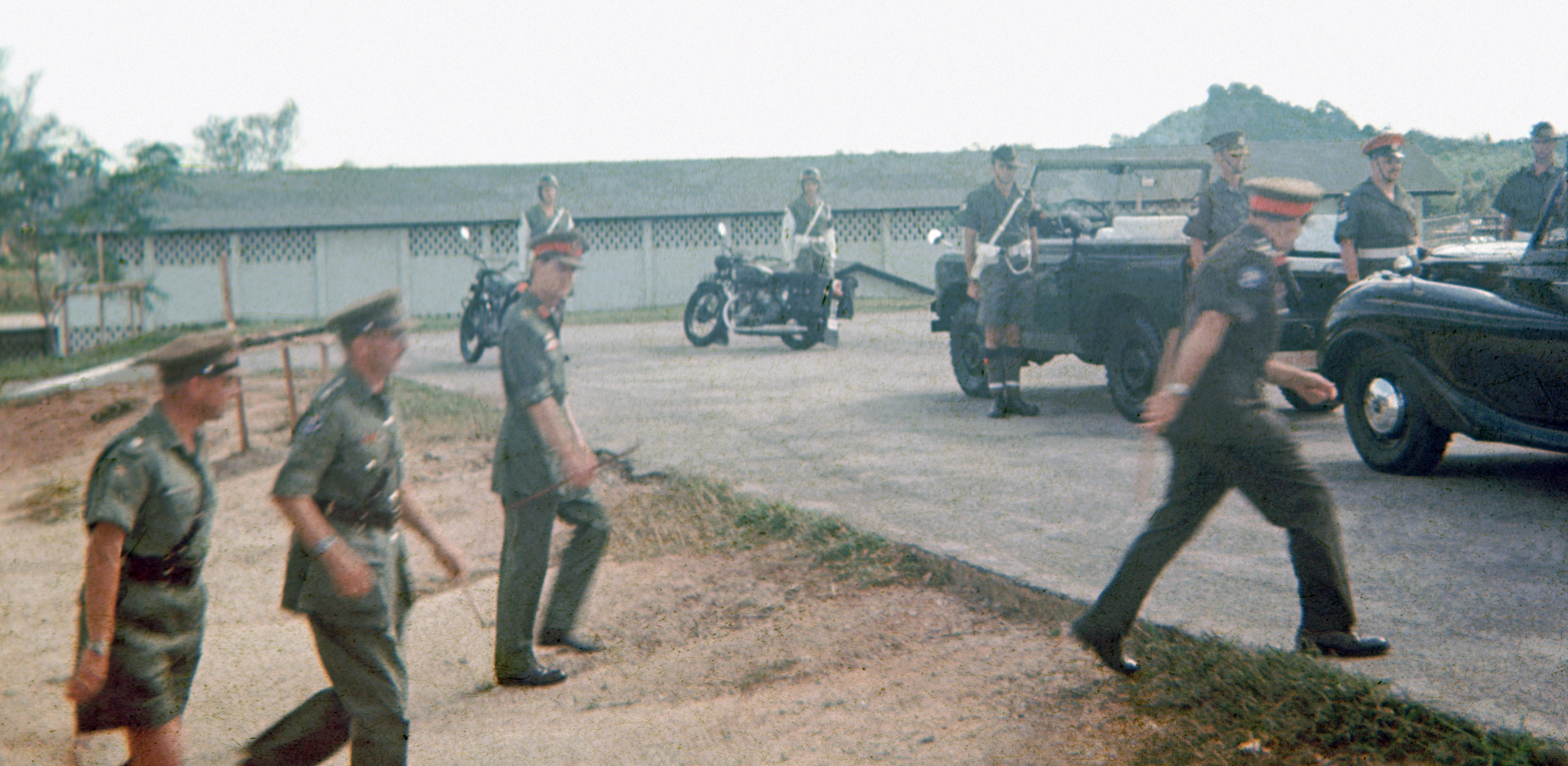
On the occasion of the visit of Prince Philip, Duke of Edinburgh to Terendak Garrison on 18 February 1965. All the schoolchildren and families came to see the royal party.

=== Under the command of the Commonwealth of Nations ===
The camp was constructed to house the 28th Commonwealth Infantry Brigade Group during their relocation from North Malaysia in 1959–1960. The newly built Camp Sungai Udang, which serves as the garrison for the Federation Regiment, was chosen as the location for the camp, dividing the Camp Sungai Udang in two. Construction began in 1957 and was partially funded by the governments of the United Kingdom, Australia, and New Zealand. The camp was originally known as Fort George before being renamed Terendak Garrison, after Terendak Hill on which the camp is located.

Construction of Terendak was started in June 1957 and was completed by 1964. Terendak covered an area of close to 1,500 acres with an additional training area of 3,500 acres.

28th Commonwealth Infantry Brigade occupancy started in late 1959 and by the mid-1960s the camp was fully occupied.

The Garrison consisted of:

- A Military Hospital
- A Transport Unit
- A Supply Depot (Foodstuffs, Fuel, Oil and Lubricants)
- A Education Centre
- A Civil Labour Unit
- A Hygiene and Malaria Control Unit
- Army Depot Police Detachment
- Barracks Services
- Commonwealth Brigade Units were accommodated in the following barrack areas:
  - Brigade Headquarters – Martang-San Lines
  - British Infantry Battalion – Imjin Lines
  - Australian Infantry Battalion – Canberra Lines
  - New Zealand Infantry Battalion – Wellington Lines
  - Artillery Regiment – Solma-Ri Lines
  - Field Engineer Squadron – Kohima Lines
  - Ordnance and Workshops – Arakan Lines
  - Field Ambulance and Hospital – Mandalay Lines

=== Under the command of the Malaysian Armed Forces ===
Terendak was handed over to the Malaysian army by the 28th Commonwealth Infantry Brigade on 28 March 1970, and has been occupied by the 1st Infantry Brigade ever since. The Camp Terendak later housed the 3rd Infantry Division, 10th Strategic Brigade (today known as the 10th Parachute Brigade), 32nd Regiment, Royal Artillery and the 94 Armed Forces Hospital.

== Tenant units ==
- 3rd Infantry Division
  - Division Headquarters
  - 1st Infantry Brigade
- 10th Parachute Brigade
  - Brigade Headquarters
  - 8th Battalion (Parachute), Royal Ranger
  - 9th Battalion (Parachute), Royal Malay
  - 17th Battalion (Parachute), Royal Malay
  - 1st Battalion (Parachute), Royal Artillery
  - 10th Squadron (Parachute), Royal Signal
  - 10th Squadron (Parachute), Royal Engineer
  - 361th Air Defence Battery (Parachute), Royal Artillery
  - 10th Field Workshop Company (Parachute), Royal Electric & Mechanical Engineer
  - Medical Company (Parachute), Royal Medical and Dental
  - Military Police Platoon (Parachute), Royal Military Police
  - Pathfinder Company (Parachute)
  - Support Company (Parachute)
- 12th Squadron, Royal Engineer
- 32nd Regiment, Royal Artillery
- 94 Armed Forces Hospital

== Facilities ==
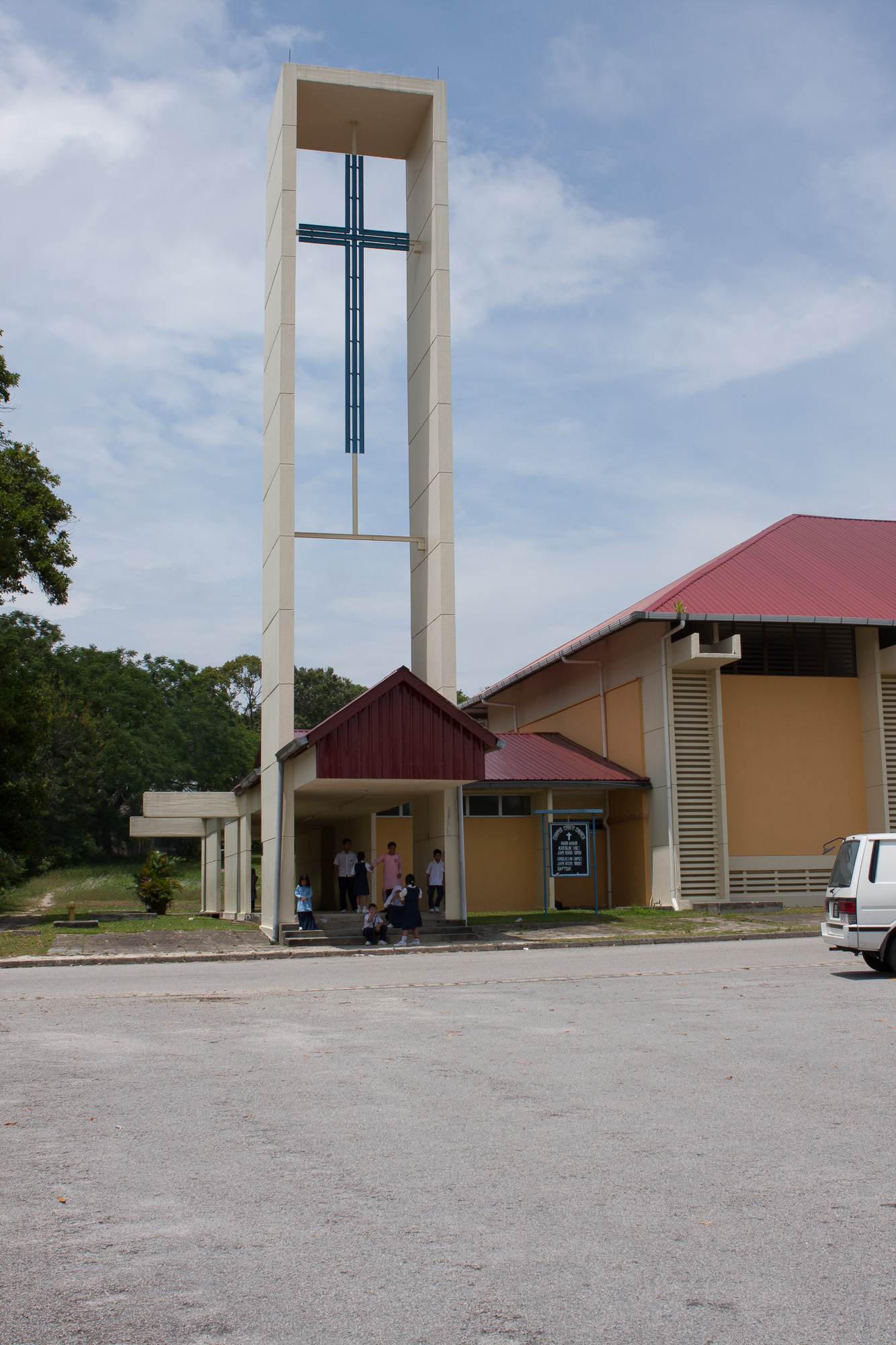
Corpus Christi Church in Camp Terendak.

Within Camp Terendak the following facilities were available:

- Four churches, including:
  - St John's Protestant
  - Corpus Christi Roman Catholic
- A mosque
- Four swimming pools
- Clubs and messes
- Shopping arcades
- A multipurpose hall
- Schools and kindergartens, including:
  - MARA Junior Science College Terendak
  - Slim High School (present-day SMK Kem Terendak)
  - Mountbatten Primary School (present-day SK Kem Terendak 1)
  - SK Kem Terendak 2
- Higher education college
  - Institut Latihan Kesihatan Angkatan Tentera (INSAN) ('Armed Forces Medical Training Institute')
- Military hospital
- Two shooting ranges
- One federal government department responsible for the construction and maintenance of the camp

== Terendak Garrison Cemetery ==
Terendak Garrison Cemetery
- Commonwealth War Graves Commission
- Used for those deceased 1948–1975
- Established: 1960
- Location: near Sungai Udang, Malacca, Malaysia

Burials by nation
- Specific figures are not available

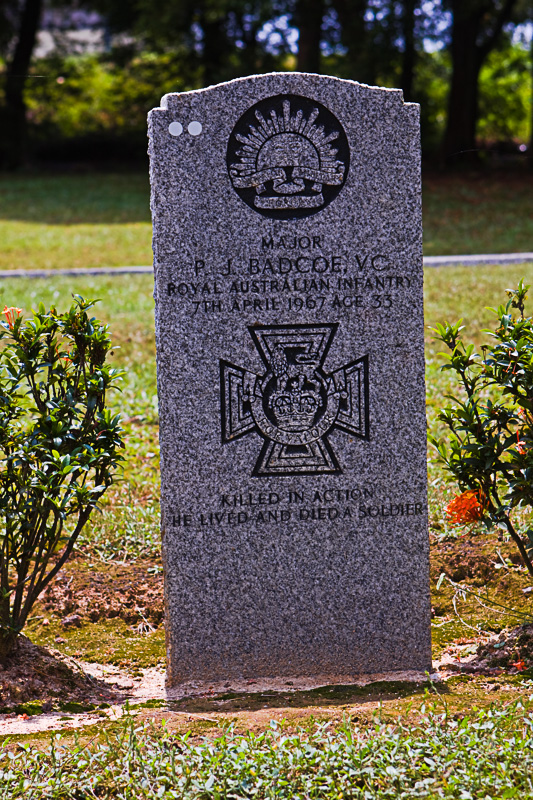
The grave of Peter Badcoe VC at the military cemetery in Camp Terendak

28th Commonwealth Infantry Brigade were actively engaged in the confrontation with Indonesia from 1963 until 1966. Some casualties from this campaign are buried in the Terendak Garrison Cemetery, additionally some Australian and New Zealand casualties from the Vietnam war are also interred at Terendak. Dependents who died of natural causes and the remains of personnel from earlier conflicts are also interred in the Terandak Garrison Cemetery.

There are now 323 non-World War servicemen and dependent burials in the Terendak Garrison Cemetery.

=== Repatriation of Australian war dead ===
On 2 June 2016, the remains of 32 persons interred at Terendak including several family members, plus one Vietnam War soldier interred at Kranji War Cemetery in Singapore, were repatriated to Australia, landing at RAAF Base Richmond on two Royal Australian Air Force C-17s. They had been dis-interred following agreement between the governments.

=== Repatriation of New Zealanders interred at Terendak ===
Between 1960 and August 2018, 18 New Zealanders who had died in Malaysia or South Vietnam were interred in the Terendak Garrison Cemetery. As the Terendak Garrison Cemetery is not a recognised Commonwealth Cemetery and the care and future of the New Zealand graves could not be guaranteed, there was a wish by New Zealand veterans groups and some families to have the remains repatriated to New Zealand for reburial. After considerable consultation and much resistance from the New Zealand Government, in 2017 an offer was finally made to the families of service personnel interred at Terendak to repatriate them at public expense as part of Project Te Auraki (The Return). Project Te Auraki is a New Zealand Government initiative to repatriate the 34 New Zealand service personnel interred in non-Commonwealth War Grave Commission-administrated cemeteries around the world. On 21 August 2018, the 18 New Zealand servicemen interred at Terendak were repatriated to New Zealand, along with the 9 other service personnel and one child interred in various cemeteries in Malaysia and Singapore.

== See also ==
- Cheras War Cemetery
- Kranji War Cemetery
- Labuan War Cemetery
- Taiping War Cemetery
