= Henry Gurney =

British colonial administrator

His Excellency Sir Henry Gurney KCMG KStJ
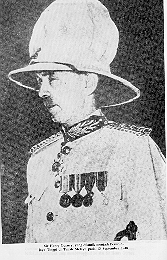

British High Commissioner in Malaya
- In office 1 October 1948 – 6 October 1951
- Preceded by: Sir Edward Gent
- Succeeded by: Field Marshal Sir Gerald Templer

Personal details
- Born: 27 June 1898 Poughill, Bude, Cornwall, England, United Kingdom
- Died: 6 October 1951 (aged 53) Fraser's Hill, Pahang, Federation of Malaya
- Cause of death: Assassination
- Resting place: Cheras Christian Cemetery
- Spouse: Lady Isabel Lowther Weir
- Education: Winchester College

Sir Henry Lovell Goldsworthy Gurney KCMG KStJ (27 June 1898 – 6 October 1951) was a British colonial administrator who served in various posts throughout the British Empire. Gurney was killed by communist insurgents during the Malayan Emergency, while serving as high commissioner in the Federation of Malaya.

== Career ==
As a boy, Gurney was educated at Winchester College. During World War I, he joined the British Army, and served with the King's Royal Rifle Corps from 1917 to 1920.

After a brief spell at University College, Oxford, he joined the British Colonial Service in 1921, and was posted to Kenya as an assistant district commissioner. In 1935, after fourteen years in Kenya, he was appointed Assistant Colonial Secretary to Jamaica. After a brief stint working at the Colonial Office in London, Gurney served as Chief Secretary to the Conference of East Africa Governors from 1938 to 1944, and Colonial Secretary in the Gold Coast from 1944 to 1946. In 1946, he was appointed Chief Secretary to Palestine, serving until the end of British rule there in 1948. While serving in Palestine, Gurney was instrumental in crafting British policy during the Jewish insurgency in Palestine.

In the 1947 New Year Honours, he was promoted to Knight Commander (KCMG) of the Order of St Michael and St George, for his service in Palestine. He had previously been a Companion (CMG) in the same order. In 1949 he was made a Knight of the Venerable Order of Saint John.

On 1 October 1948, Gurney was appointed High Commissioner to Malaya. Gurney assumed his post as the Malayan Emergency was beginning, and over the next three years he became the chief architect of British policy in Malaya.

== Assassination ==
On 6 October 1951, Gurney was killed in an ambush by communist insurgents from the Malayan Communist Party while on his way to a resort at Mile 56 ½, Kuala Kubu Road near Fraser's Hill. According to Communist leader Chin Peng, the ambush was routine and the guerrillas only learned the High Commissioner was among the dead from news reports.

Gurney's funeral took place on 8 October. He was buried in Cheras Christian Cemetery in Kuala Lumpur, in a ceremony that drew thousands of people.

== Honours ==
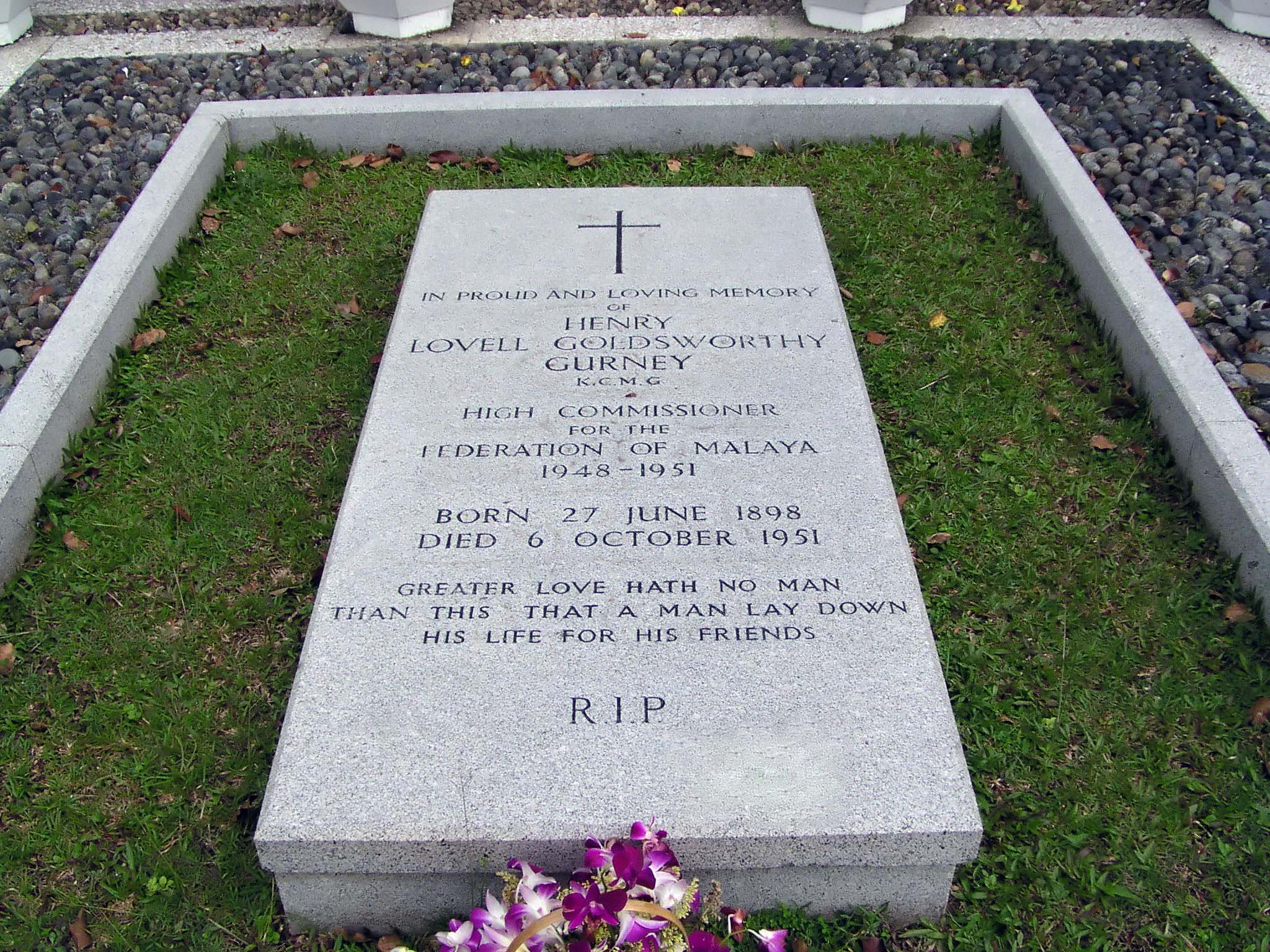
Gurney's grave at Cheras Christian Cemetery

Today, several roads in Kuala Lumpur are named after him. The town named Pekan Gurney in Perak is also named after him. The popular beachfront Gurney Drive, in Penang, is also named after him, as well as the Henry Gurney Prisoners School in Teluk Mas, Malacca. Gurney was buried at Cheras War Cemetery in Kuala Lumpur, Malaysia.

His tombstone is inscribed:

In proud and loving memory of Henry Lovell Goldsworthy Gurney K.C.M.G. High Commissioner for the Federation of Malaya 1948–1951 Born 27 June 1898 Died 6 October 1951 Greater Love Hath No Man Than This That A Man Lay Down His Life for His Friends R.I.P.

Government offices
Preceded by Sir Gerard Edward James Gent	British High Commissioner in Malaya; 1948–1951	Succeeded by Sir Gerald Walter Robert Templer
Preceded by Sir John Valentine Wistar Shaw	Chief Secretary of Mandatory Palestine; 1946–1948	Succeeded by Office abolished
