= Fraser's Hill =

Hill station in Pahang, Malaysia

Fraser's Hill Bukit Fraser
- Hill station
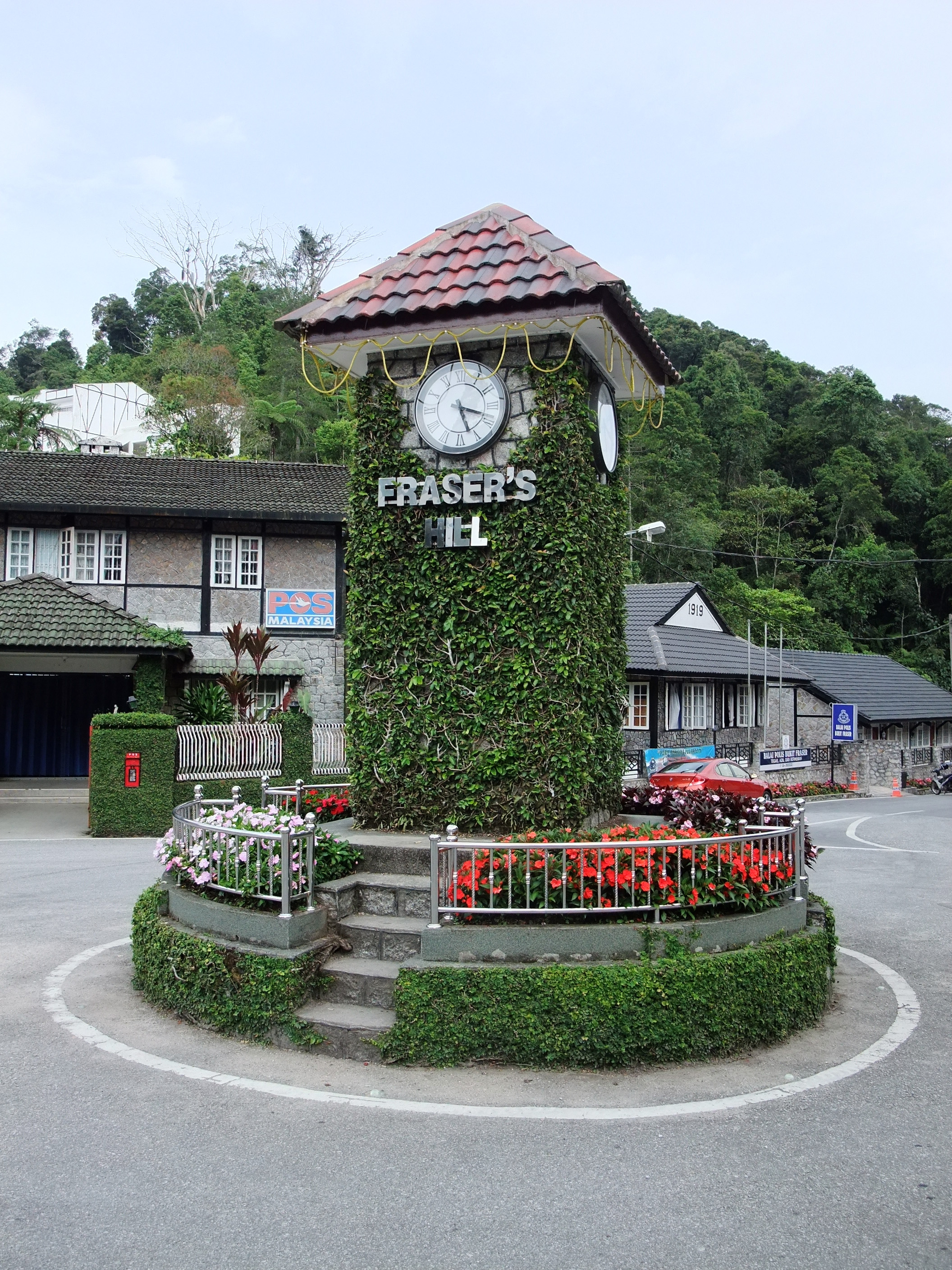
- Fraser's Hill clock tower

- Seal
- Etymology: Founder's name, Louis James Fraser
- Nickname: Little England of Malaysia
- Location within Malaysia Location within Pahang
- Coordinates: 03°42′43″N 101°44′11″E
- Country: Malaysia
- State: Pahang
- District: Raub District
- Founded: 1890 (as tin mining area)
- Converted to resort: 1922
- Founder: Lewis James Fraser

Area
  - Total: 830 km^{2} (320 sq mi)
  - Urban: 2,829 ha (6,990 acres)
- Elevation: 1,456 m (4,777 ft)

Population (2013)
  - Total: 1,000
  - Density: 1.2/km^{2} (3.1/sq mi)
- Time zone: UTC+08:00 (MST)
- Postcode: 49000
- Telephone area code: +6-09
- Website: pkbf.gov.my

Fraser's Hill (Malay: Bukit Fraser) is a hill resort in Raub District, Pahang, Malaysia, on the Pahangese and Selangorean sections of the Titiwangsa Mountains. It is about 100 km (62 mi) north of Kuala Lumpur. In 1890, Lewis James Fraser established the area as a tin mining community known as Pamah Lebar when he discovered rich tin deposits and opened a tin mining facility. Mining activity there was short-lived, as the tin ore was depleted in 1913. This led many miners and farmers to abandon the area. Fraser reportedly disappeared in 1910, but research in 2019 concluded that he retired from his position and returned to Great Britain in 1900. He died in 1906 while travelling in Austria-Hungary.

An attempt by J. Ferguson-Davie to locate Fraser in the area failed. While he searched for Fraser, Ferguson-Davie recognised the area's potential as a suitable location to set up a hill station. Its cool climate made Pamah Lebar an ideal retreat to escape from the usually hot climate in Malaysia. Construction began in October 1919 to convert the mine area into a resort. The site was renamed Fraser's Hill and opened to visitors in 1922. Subsequent development occurred in the 1970s in response to increased tourism activity. While this provided room for more visitors, it had an impact on the environment, including deforestation and water pollution prompting a halt to further developments in April 2010. Fraser's Hill is known for its vast biodiversity, attracting scientists and researchers. In recent years, Fraser's Hill has increased tourist activities. These include hiking, cycling and golfing with other sports such as archery, paddle boat, horseback riding, tennis, swimming and squash are available. The population of Fraser's Hill was 1,000 in 2013.

== History ==
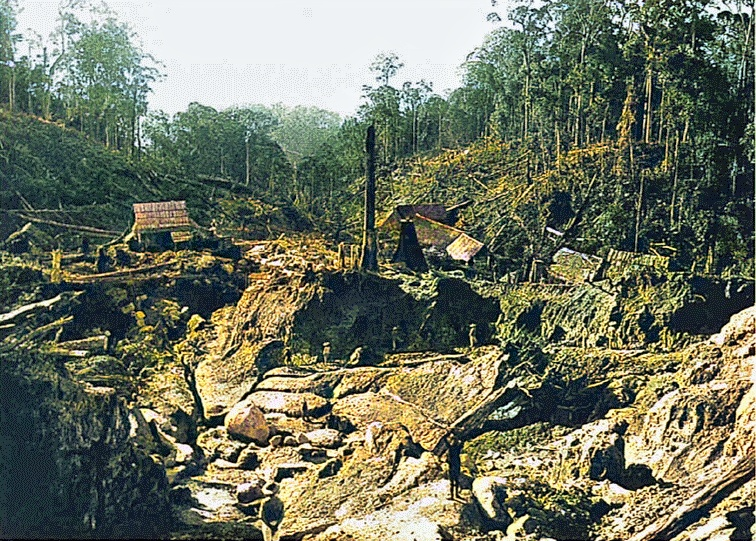
Tin mining in Fraser's Hill. Fraser's Hill was a mining community before it opened as a hill resort in 1922.

Fraser's Hill is named after Lewis James Fraser (1841–1906), a Scottish trader and accountant. After a failed gold mining venture in Australia, he migrated to the Federated Malay States in 1890 looking for a new venture in tin mining. He set up a tin-ore trading post in Tras. As mining activity flourished at the foot of Fraser's Hill, Fraser became a tin merchant and bought crude tin ore from Malay and Chinese miners in Tras and Sempam and used mules to transport the ores to Kuala Kubu. He later recruited guides and coolies and formed an expedition to search the upper ridges for valuable minerals such as gold. The expedition found an ancient forest of moss-draped trees and ferns that resembled prehistoric forests. A cloud layer kept the vegetation constantly moist. At the same time, Fraser found rich tin deposits on the hill and recruited Chinese miners to open a mine known as Pamah Lebar which would later become the current location of Fraser's Hill golf course. A track was then constructed for mules to carry tin ore to The Gap and Kuala Kubu. Fraser then moved his tin ore trading base from Tras to Fraser's Hill. The first mining lease was officially issued to Abu Suradi in November 1899; the last one was issued in 1906 to Robert Lewis and the Sempam Mining Company Limited. However, as the tin ore was depleted quickly by 1913, mining activity declined, and many Chinese miners and farmers moved away from the town.

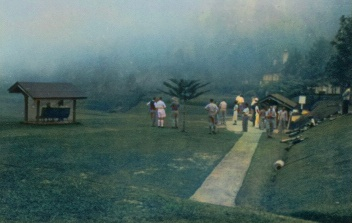
Fraser's Hill golf course in 1935. This land previously housed a tin mining facility until the tin was exhausted and it closed down in the 1900s.

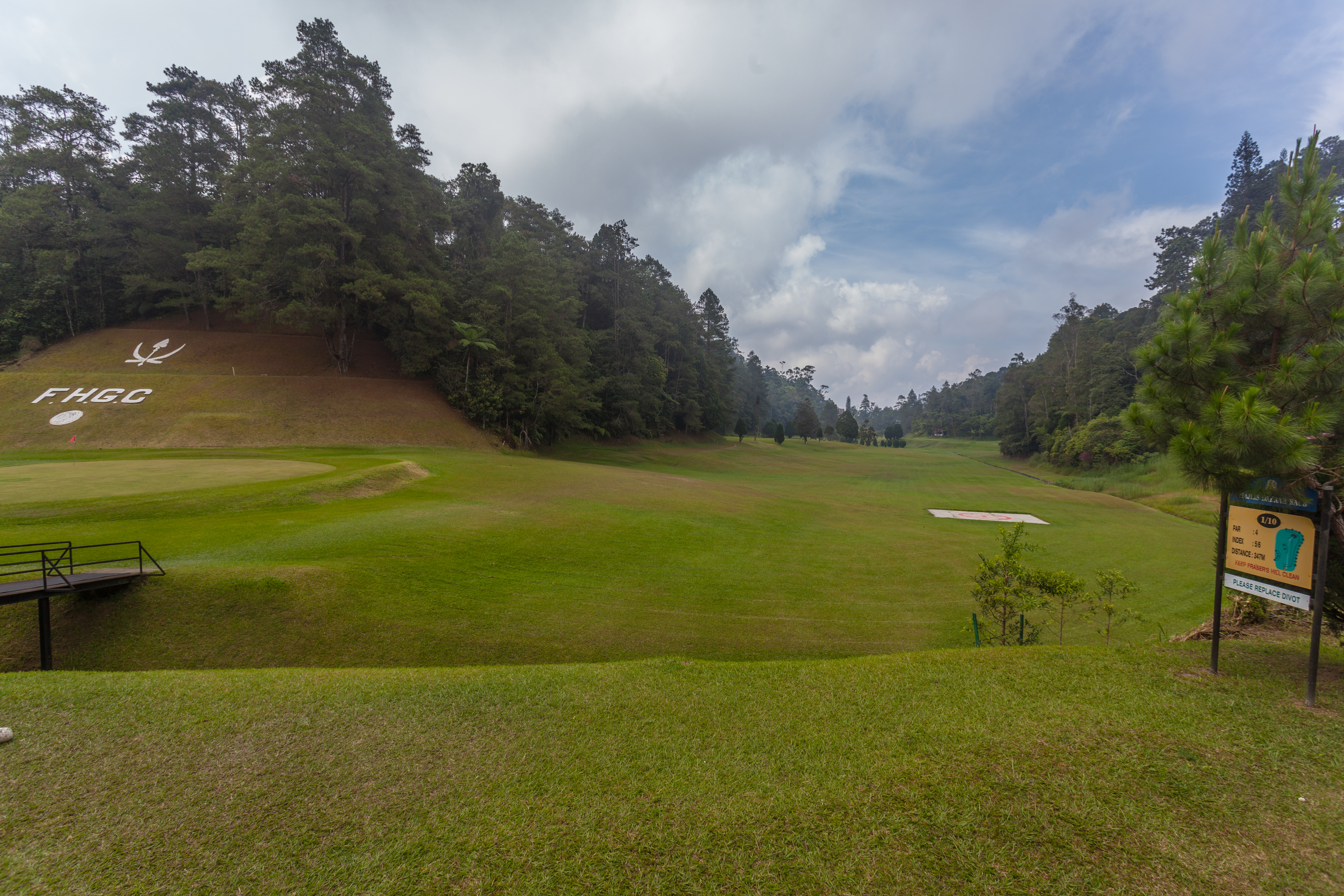
Fraser's Hill golf course in 2012. Looking downhole 1 fairway.

Initially, Fraser was reported as having disappeared in 1910, however, the latest research by R. Hale in 2019 uncovered that he retired from his position and returned to Great Britain in 1900 and died while vacationing in Austria-Hungary in 1906. When C. J. Ferguson-Davie, the bishop of Singapore, attempted to find Fraser in 1917, he was unable to find him. Instead, he discovered the place was suitable for building a hill station as a retreat from the valley's hot climate. He wrote a report to the high commissioner and chief secretary of the Federated Malay States to suggest that a hill station be built at this location. A preliminary topographical survey was drawn up in August 1919, which confirmed the area was a suitable location for a hill station. Later, R.C.M. Kindersley, an unofficial member of the Federal Council, stated that the committee aimed to make the Fraser's Hill area a holiday resort. Construction of Fraser's Hill began in October 1919 when F.W. Mager, Pahang state engineer, surveyed the site for building construction and cleared the land around Fraser's former bungalow to build a road from The Gap to provide access to the hill station. The place was renamed Fraser's Hill and opened to visitors in 1922.

On 7 October 1951, during the Malayan Emergency, the British high commissioner in Malaya, Sir Henry Gurney, was assassinated near Fraser's Hill by Communist guerillas. According to Chin Peng, the guerillas, led by Siew Ma, did not plan the assassination. They were unaware that Gurney was a member of the convoy they had ambushed at The Gap. The guerillas were also unaware that the person they had assassinated was Gurney until Radio Malaya announced the news the following day.

Unlike Genting Highlands and Cameron Highlands, Fraser’s Hill is not a centre for entertainment but rather a place for people to retreat from the hustle and bustle of city life.

— Stated by Mohd Sharkar Shamsuddin, Pahang Arts, Tourism and Culture Committee chairman, during 2015 renovation proposal

The 1970s saw another surge in building development because of optimism over tourism with more investments made by public and private sectors. As a result, 59 new rooms were built for visitors in 1974, with an additional 178 rooms built later. The average annual growth rate for visitors visiting hill stations in Malaysia between 1977 and 1984, including Fraser's Hill, Cameron Highlands and Genting Highlands was eight per cent, which was higher than the national average of five per cent. However, the expansion of tourist development has negatively impacted the environment with deforestation, more species facing extinction and water pollution affecting the lives of the Orang Asli (first people) and residents in other villages. These issues led to the Pahang state government ruling out further development in the virgin forest at Fraser's Hill on 13 April 2010. It was not until May 2015 when The Star reported that some resorts had fallen into disrepair because of a lack of maintenance coupled with infrequent collection of rubbish and some abandoned bungalows had been taken over by squatters. In response, the state government of Pahang proposed renovation in the hill resorts for ten years at the cost of between RM 100 million to RM 200 million. The hill resort's renovation had to be meticulous to not turn Fraser's Hill into a tourist-focused hill station, notably Genting Highlands and Cameron Highlands. Instead, it focused on improving existing facilities and preserving the colonial legacy of the hill station. On 28 April 2019, Fraser's Hill celebrated its 100th year anniversary as a hill station resort. Since further development was halted in 2010, only 10 per cent of Fraser's Hill overall land has been developed. Overdevelopment of the area would result in further destruction of the environment.

== Geography ==
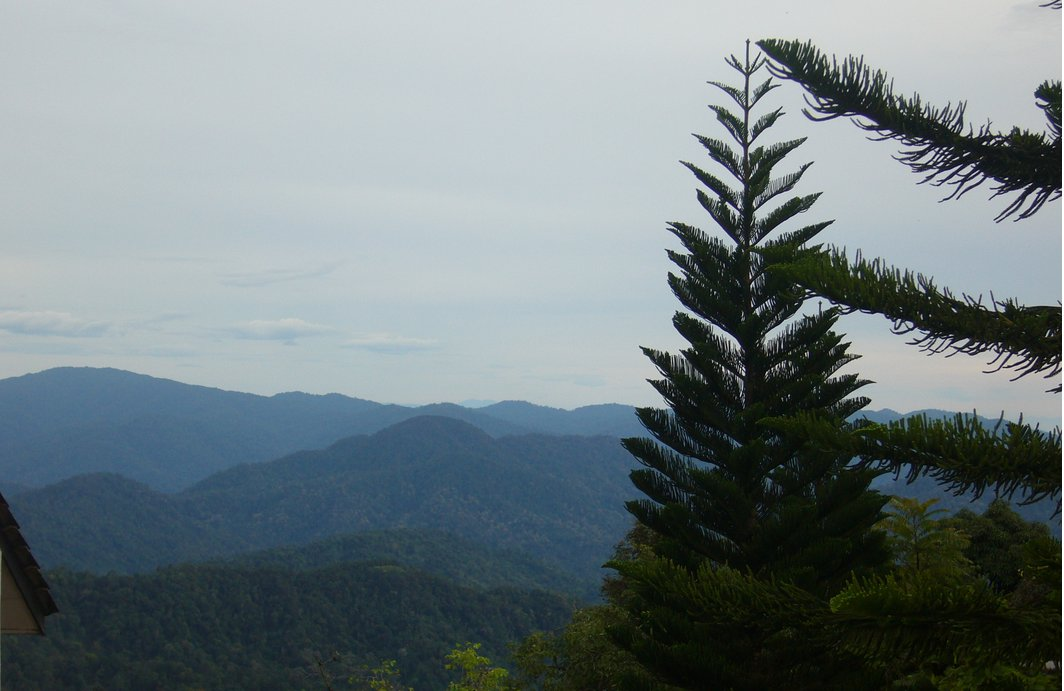
View of the Pahangese/Selangorean Titiwangsa from Fraser's Hill.

Fraser's Hill is a mountainous terrain where the altitude ranges between 320 m (1,050 ft) and 1,460 m (4,790 ft) above sea level. Around 44% of the terrain area is ranked as steep, while flat areas make up 8% of the overall land area. Fraser's Hill's virgin forest coverage is around 92% of the overall land area, with only 1.5% of the area used for a town. 6.5% of the forest area has been cleared for secondary vegetation. Ten river systems in Malaysia originate in Fraser's Hill, including Selangor River, a major water source for Selangor, and Teranum River which forms a major river system in eastern Pahang. The geology of the area is predominantly granite, which forms sandy, porous soil and easily eroded.

=== Climate ===
Fraser's Hill's climate is classified as tropical. Rainfall is significant in this area throughout the year. The climate is Af according to the Köppen-Geiger climate classification system. The temperature here averages 20 °C (68 °F). The average yearly rainfall is 2,665 mm (104.9 in). Precipitation is the lowest in July, with an average of 118 mm (4.6 in). The most precipitation falls in November—an average of 341 mm (13.4 in). With an average temperature of 20.8 °C (69.4 °F), May is the hottest month of the year. January has the lowest average temperature of the year—18.9 °C (66.0 °F). Between the driest and wettest months, the difference in precipitation is 223 mm (8.8 in).

Climate data for Fraser's Hill, elevation 1,301 m (4,268 ft)
Month	Jan	Feb	Mar	Apr	May	Jun	Jul	Aug	Sep	Oct	Nov	Dec	Year
Record high °C (°F)	26.8 (80.2)	27.8 (82.0)	26.8 (80.2)	27.8 (82.0)	28.2 (82.8)	28.8 (83.8)	28.8 (83.8)	28.0 (82.4)	28.2 (82.8)	27.4 (81.3)	26.4 (79.5)	25.6 (78.1)	28.8 (83.8)
Mean daily maximum °C (°F)	21.0 (69.8)	22.0 (71.6)	23.0 (73.4)	23.0 (73.4)	24.0 (75.2)	24.0 (75.2)	23.0 (73.4)	23.0 (73.4)	23.0 (73.4)	23.0 (73.4)	22.0 (71.6)	21.0 (69.8)	22.7 (72.8)
Mean daily minimum °C (°F)	16.0 (60.8)	16.0 (60.8)	17.0 (62.6)	17.0 (62.6)	18.0 (64.4)	17.0 (62.6)	17.0 (62.6)	17.0 (62.6)	17.0 (62.6)	17.0 (62.6)	16.0 (60.8)	17.0 (62.6)	16.8 (62.3)
Record low °C (°F)	13.6 (56.5)	14.2 (57.6)	14.2 (57.6)	14.8 (58.6)	16.0 (60.8)	15.0 (59.0)	14.8 (58.6)	15.1 (59.2)	14.8 (58.6)	15.0 (59.0)	14.4 (57.9)	14.2 (57.6)	13.6 (56.5)
Average rainfall mm (inches)	366.2 (14.42)	332.5 (13.09)	344.2 (13.55)	375.1 (14.77)	429.6 (16.91)	276.6 (10.89)	193.6 (7.62)	237.2 (9.34)	375.2 (14.77)	365.7 (14.40)	474.8 (18.69)	418.6 (16.48)	4,189.3 (164.93)
Average rainy days	18	15	15	18	16	13	15	16	19	23	23	23	214
Average relative humidity (%)	85	81	80	82	79	80	78	78	79	80	84	86	81
Source 1: Malaysian Meteorological Department
Source 2: DTIC

=== Biodiversity ===
Fraser's Hill is located in one of Malaysia's few pristine forests. The high level of biodiversity, first recognised by botanist H. N. Ridley in 1897, has become an area of great interest to scientists and researchers. Over 10% of all plant species discovered in Peninsular Malaysia are located in Fraser's Hill, which is home to 952 indigenous species and 36 endemic species. Thirteen of these were considered extinct and had not been found again for more than 60 years. It is also one of the three available places in the world where the rare Trig Oak (Trigonobalanops verticillata) was discovered.

The most dominant group of animals found on Fraser's Hill are invertebrates including: ants, bees, beetles, cicadas, grasshoppers, moths, spiders and termites. They play an important role in sustaining a healthy ecosystem in the region. According to the IUCN Red List, as of 2013, three mammals are listed as endangered: the Malayan tapir (Tapirus indicus), the siamang (Symphalangus syndactylus) and the Malayan tiger (Panthera tigris jacksoni), while two mammals were listed as vulnerable—the serow (Capricornis sumatraensis) and the Malayan sun bear (Helarctos malayanus). Fraser's Hill hosts 250 migratory and residential bird species. Some migrate from the harsh winter in Russia, China and Japan to Fraser's Hill. Others rest at Fraser's Hill for a few months before flying south to Australia and New Zealand for their warmer climate. Birdlife International has designated this area as an important bird area because of its large number of species.

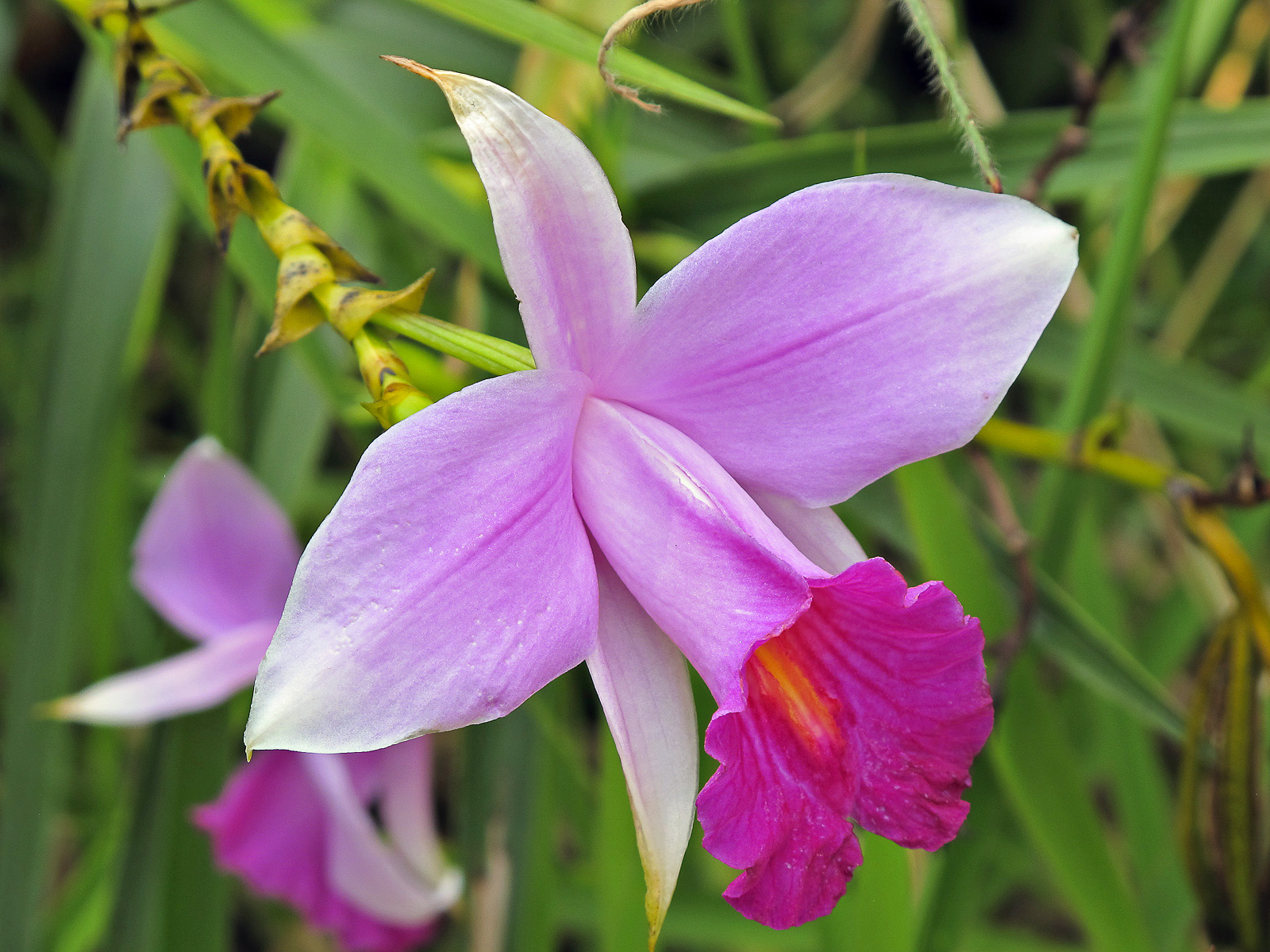
Wild Bamboo Orchid (Arundina graminifolia)

Dusky Langur (Trachypithecus obscurus)

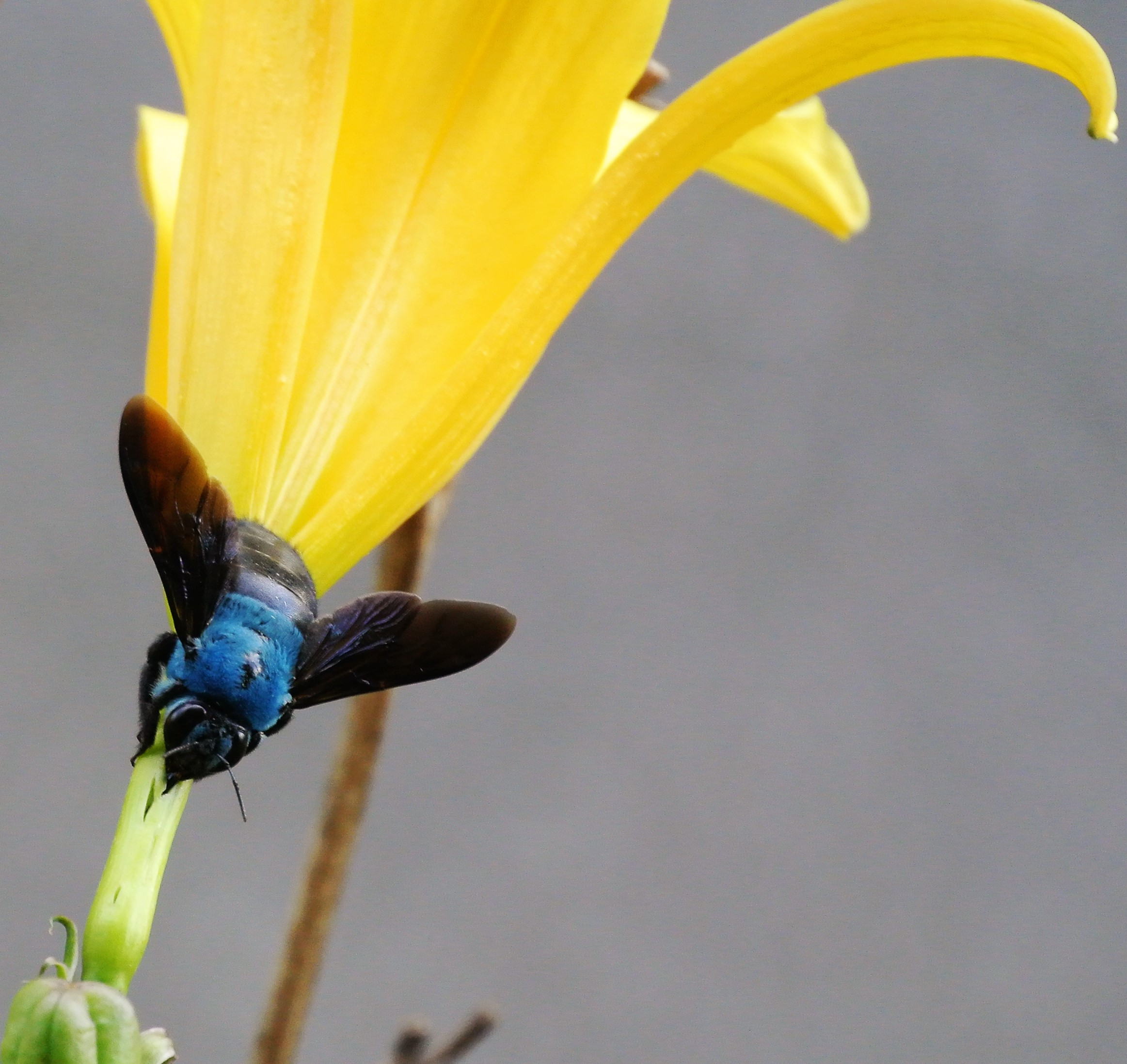
Carpenter bee (Xylocopa caerulea)

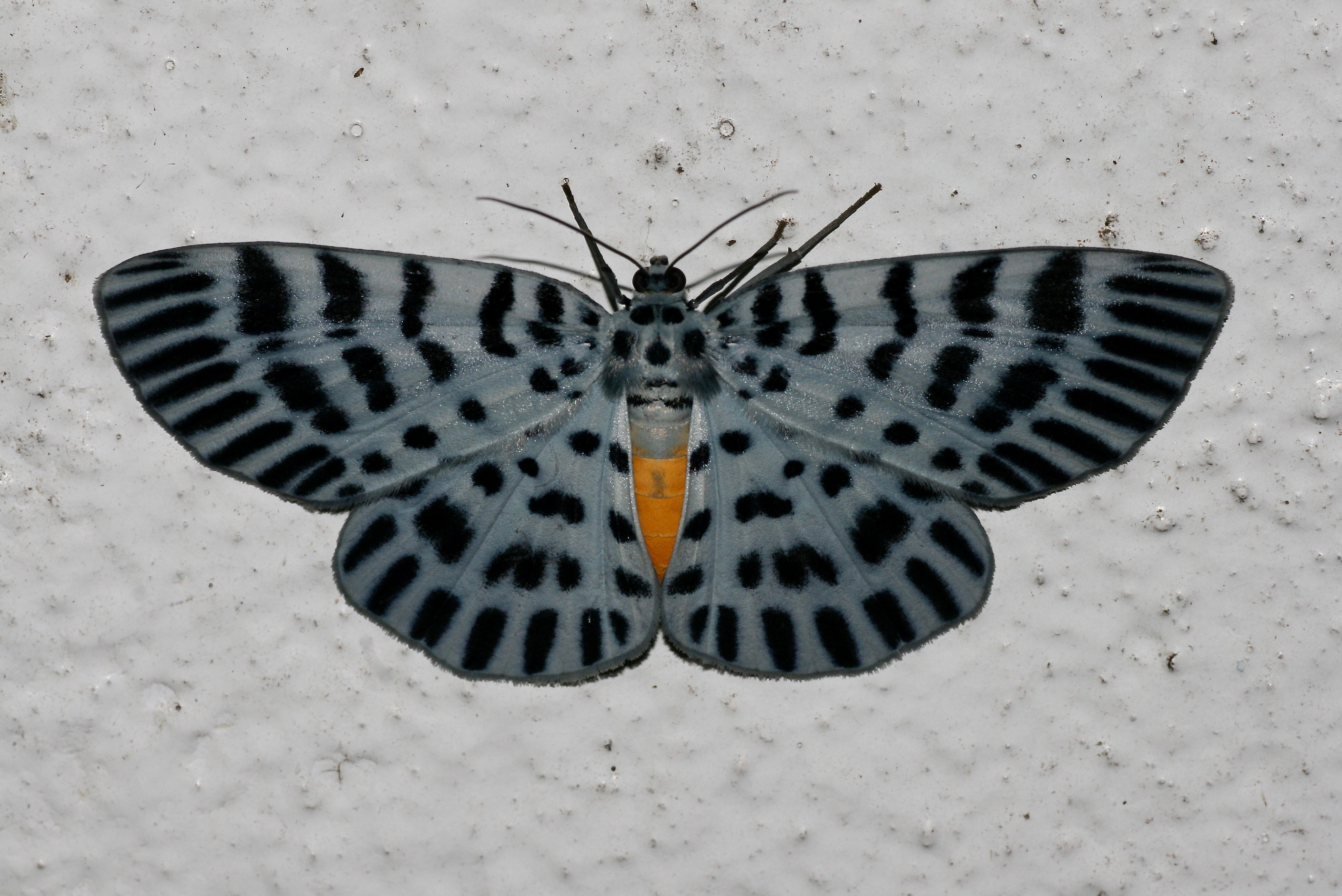
Bracca maculosa

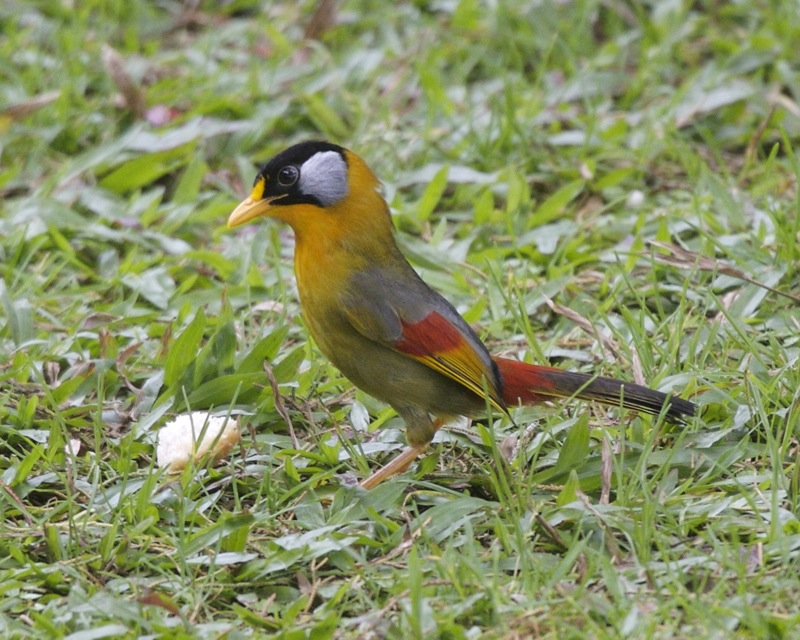
Silver-eared Mesia (Leiothrix argentauris)

=== Environmental issues ===
Deforestation in Fraser's Hill.

The construction of a second golf course near the Jeriau Waterfall involved deforestation, which saw some rare species from its steep slopes. This issue raised concerns among botanists as further development in the area will greatly impact the environment, including the loss of rare and endangered plant species. The second golf course construction also caused Jeriau Waterfall and the Sungai Hijau river to silt. Jeriau Waterfall is a popular Fraser Hill recreation area.

The construction of a new road known as Federal Route 148 also posed environmental threats to Fraser’s Hill. The construction of this new road involved the clearing of forest, which caused habitat fragmentation, and some montane forest was removed during the process. Cracks, road collapse and landslides occur on some parts of the road. Boulders were exposed from slope failures, and some of them are hanging precariously on the hill, with some falling onto the road below. These issues delayed the new road's opening from June 1996 to late 1997, and the new road was finally opened officially to the public in August 2001.

Residents and visitors have reported illegal collection and poaching of wild species to Fraser’s Hill. Flora such as pitcher plants, orchids and herbs with medicinal value and fauna ranging butterflies to insects and birds were targeted for collection. Such illegal activities were possible because the existing trails allowed easy access to the forests. A lack of real-time monitoring of this illegal activity could lead to over-collection of wild species and will deplete their numbers in Fraser’s Hill.

== Demographics ==
As of 2013, the population of Fraser's Hill was only 1,000 residents. Population growth in Fraser's Hill had lagged in the previous 20 years due to the scarcity of available job opportunities in the area, caused by low demand for any form of development, including no residential development since 2000. The absence of a high school in the area has also been attributed to the population decline which forced students to move to larger towns with high schools such as Raub, Kuala Kubu Bharu and Kuala Lumpur. The elderly would also move away when they retired or following the death of family members, or when their children secured jobs elsewhere. As of 2018, only 40 Chinese people remained in the town, a majority of whom were older than 50, a number that has declined from an estimated 100 people in 2015. Fraser’s Hill also suffers from a digital divide resulting from the lack of adoption of information technology. Despite these reasons, some people have moved into Fraser's Hill from urban areas, mainly Kuala Lumpur, due to wanting to experience the tranquility of nature, or having an interest in improving tourism in the area.

== Architecture ==
Fraser's Hill's architecture largely sports a mock Tudor design, reflecting colonial designs and architecture used in the colonial era. This design was used for the Fraser's Hill clock tower as amenities building and bungalows. As of 2019, only 46 of the 79 buildings at Fraser's Hill were listed as heritage buildings built from 1919 to 1957. Each heritage building was categorised into one of five types:

Type	Function	Example
British government-funded bungalows	Resorts and retreats for senior employees	Kindersley Bungalow
Red Cross and the Order of St John of Jerusalem-funded bungalows	Rest area for ex-British armed forces servicemen	Smokehouse (previously Red Cross rehabilitation center)
British private company-owned bungalows	Holiday retreats for a companies' senior employees	Glen Bungalow
Amenities buildings	To serve public functions	Fraser’s Hill post office and police station
Private individuals’ buildings	Buildings owned by individuals or groups of individuals	S.M. Stores

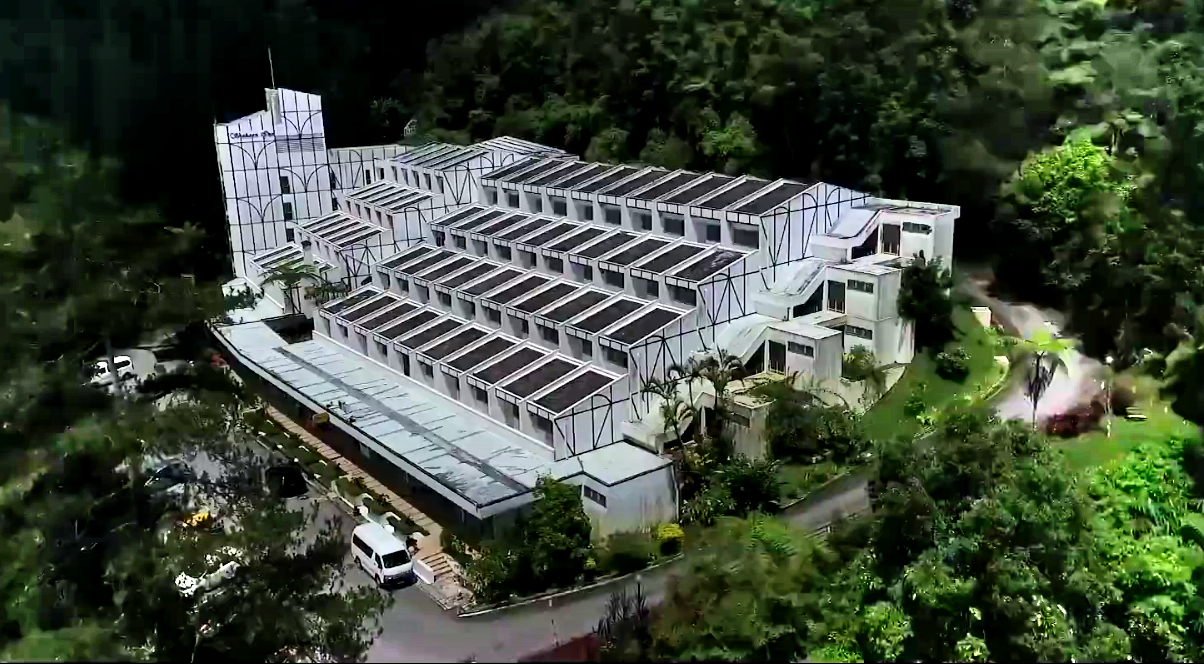
Wyndham Garden Shahzan Fraser's Hill, formerly known as Shahzan Inn, a hotel built in 1976 that utilises modern architecture design instead of Mock Tudor.

Several colonial-era bungalows originally built as residences during the colonial era were converted for a different purpose. Dacres Bungalow and Kindersley Bungalow were repurposed as accommodations with modern facilities. Richmond Bungalow was converted into a restaurant while retaining its British-style interior. The Smokehouse, originally a Red Cross rehabilitation centre opened in 1924, was converted into a hotel with a restaurant that serves British cuisine and has become one of Fraser's notable restaurants. The presence of colonial-era buildings has become an important aspect of promoting tourism in Fraser's Hill. This has successfully attracted tourists to be able to experience a British-styled town without the need to visit the United Kingdom.

Despite being a heritage town, modern-styled building began to appear in the 1970s with the construction of Shahzan Inn (Note: Originally opened as the Merlin Hotel.) which opened on 6 March 1976. The introduction of high-rise apartments such as Fraser’s Silverpark Resort had a visual impact because its height exceeded that of the tree line. The introduction of high-rise buildings in Fraser’s Hill was opposed by the public, especially the proposed construction of the 15-storey Fraser’s Hill Resort and Spa which is to begin in August 2020. Expected to be completed in 2026, it would be the tallest building in Fraser’s Hill. The public were concerned over the demolition of the colonial-styled Maybank Lodge on the construction site, risk of loss of biodiversity as the construction site is a popular birdwatching spot to view rare birds and soil erosion. The Association of Nature and Heritage of Fraser’s Hill (Persatuan Alam & Warisan Bukit Fraset (PAWBF)) filed a petition to review the proposal of the construction the resort which has since led to construction of the resort being suspended as of 13 August 2020.

== Economy ==
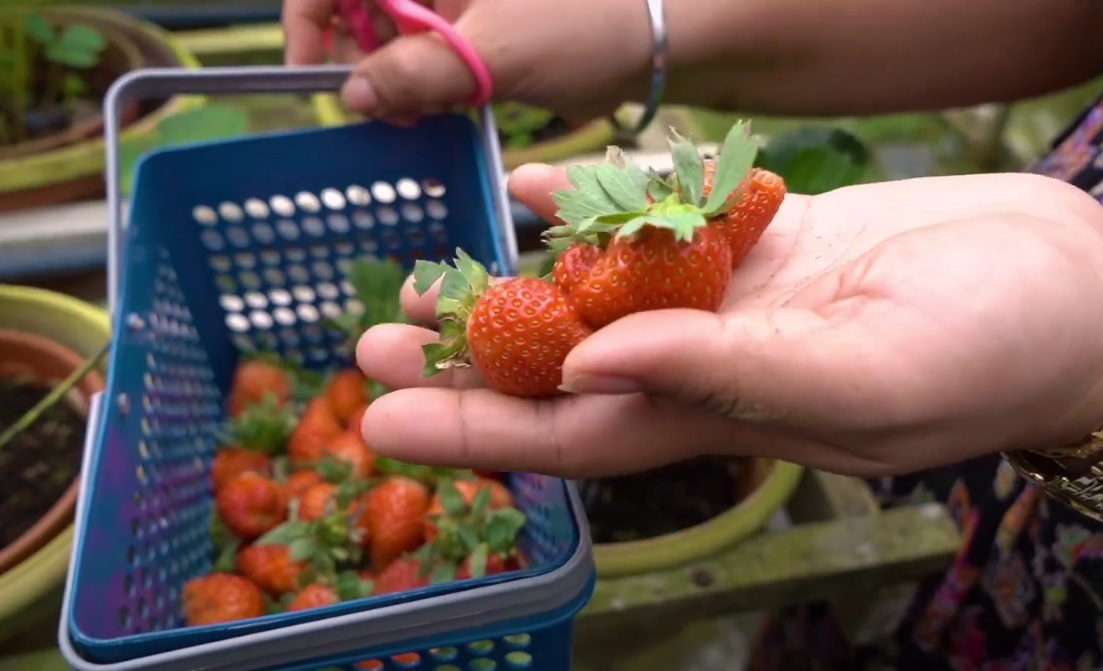
Strawberries grown and picked in Fraser's Hill strawberry farm.

The economy of Fraser's Hill relies heavily on tourism. Approximately half of those employed here work in the hospitality industry, including individuals operating their businesses, while the rest work in the public sector. The commercial sector in Fraser’s Hill is mainly made up of hotels, restaurants, souvenir and retail stores and is an important supplement for the tourism industry in this hill resort.

Agricultural activity began in Fraser's Hill in 1976 when the Fraser's Hill Development Corporation, in partnership with FIMA corporation, established a vegetable and poultry farm covering 180 acres (73 ha) to produce eggs, chickens and vegetables. Crops grown on the vegetable farm include: cabbages, capsicum, carrots, French beans, green peas, lettuce, mandarin oranges, onions, strawberries and tomatoes. A strawberry farm was established in 2018 with 4,800 strawberry plants with plans to plant an additional 30,000 plants after positive response from tourists. The inclusion of a strawberry plantation makes Fraser's Hill only the second region in Malaysia after Cameron Highlands with a strawberry plantation. A flower nursery also operates in Fraser’s Hill selling flowers to residents and visitors as well as large clients including Shah Alam National Botanic Gardens, Kuala Lumpur City Hall and other municipal councils in Malaysia. A small greenhouse known as the Glasshouse was opened in July 2018 which showcases various cacti and includes a café.

Fraser Hill relies on income generated from tourism activities. However, in July 2023, news emerged that Fraser's Hill is in decline due to multiple infrastructure issues including poorly maintained drains and waste management.

== Transport ==
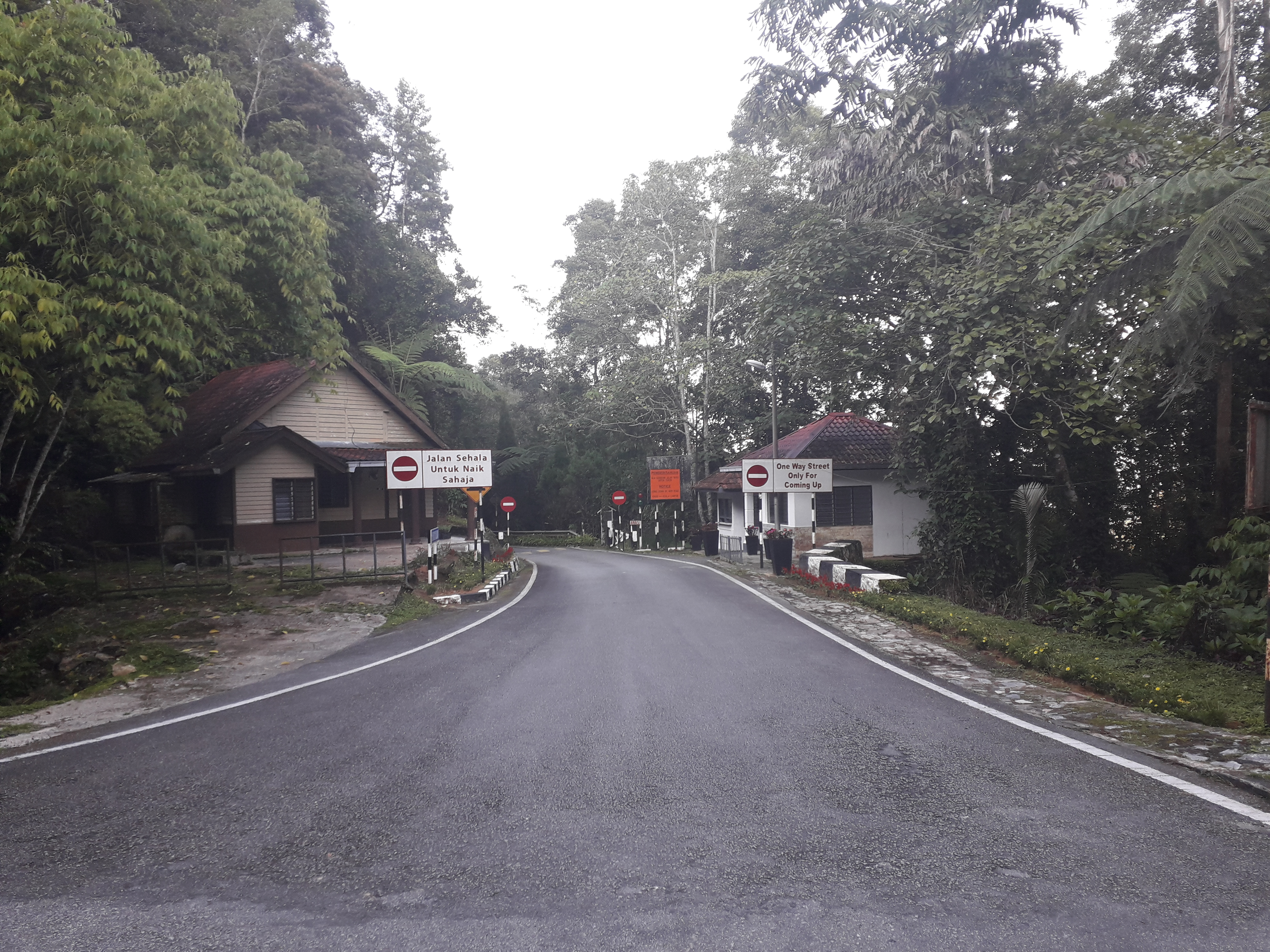
End of Federal Route 56 one-way section at the top of the hill.

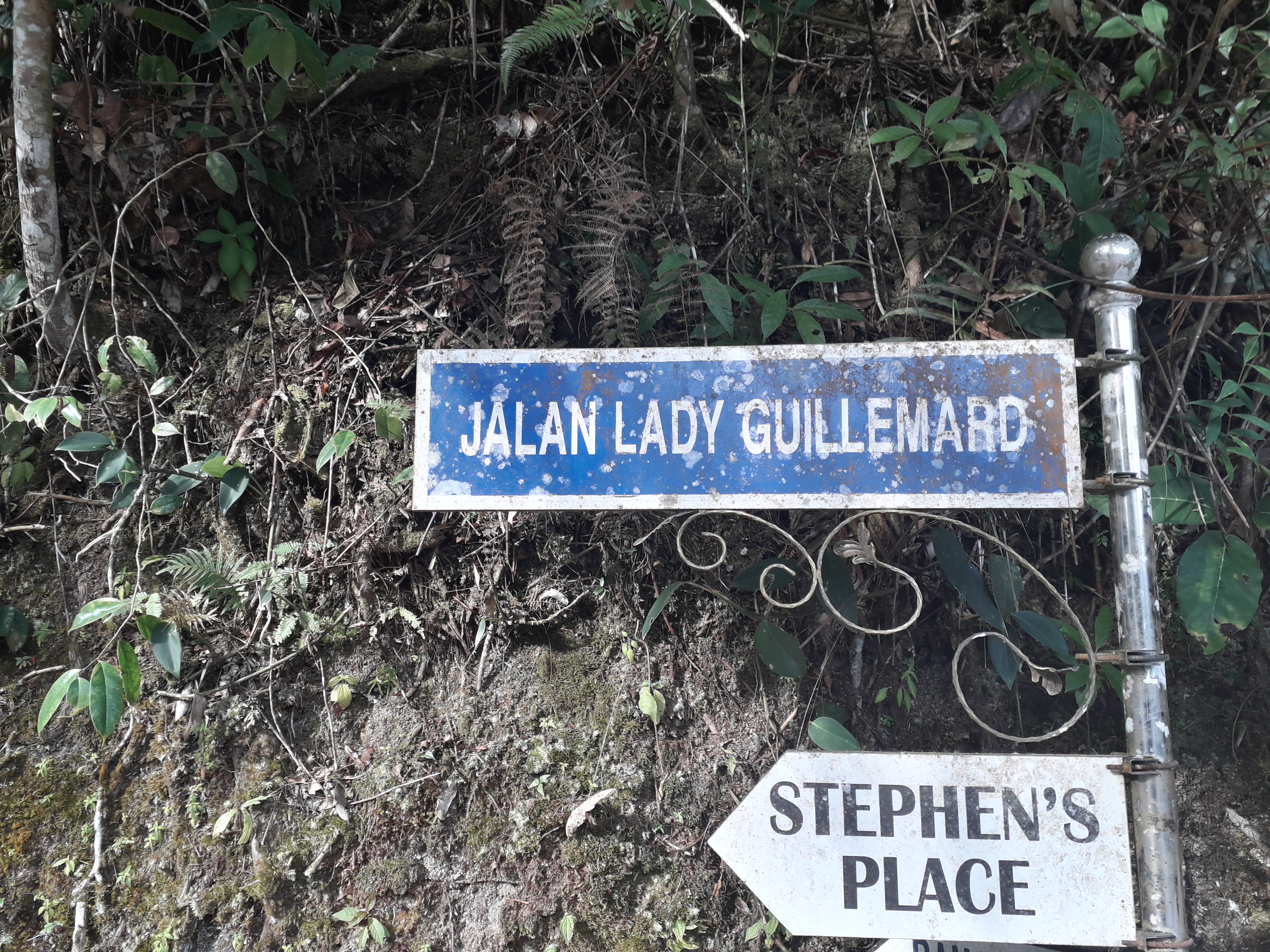
Lady Guillemard Road.

Road crossing through the jungle in Fraser’s Hill (2021)

Before 2001, the only road that linked Fraser's Hill and the rest of Malaysia was Federal Route 56 (also known as Jalan Bukit Fraser 1 or Jalan Gap-Bukit Fraser), which runs from the hill station to The Gap. Unlike most federal roads in Malaysia, Jalan Bukit Fraser is a single-lane federal road whose direction used to be reversed hourly before the newer Jalan Bukit Fraser 2 Route 148 was completed in August 2001 for downhill traffic at a cost of RM 50 million. Now, the older Federal Route 56 is used for uphill traffic at all times and the newer Federal Route 148 is used for downhill traffic. It is maintained by the Malaysian Public Works Department (JKR) and the Fraser's Hill Development Corporation (FHDC). The road can be accessed by car, taxi, motorcycle and bicycle. Double-decker buses are prohibited from using the Fraser's Hill roads. Every area within Fraser's Hill is connected by several roads formerly known as Federal Route 422. Most of the road names inside Fraser's Hill, such as Lady Guillemard Road and Lady Maxwell Road, have remained unchanged since Malaysian independence.

Fraser’s Hill used to have a petrol station that served both residents and visitors to the area but ceased operations in 2001. To overcome this dilemma, individuals sell petrol in bottles in this area to accommodate drivers who need it. Fraser's Hill also used to have public transportation but this service has since been discontinued when the Pahang Lin Siong bus that provided a bus link between Fraser's Hill, Raub and Kuala Kubu Bharu ended their service before 2001. The residents of Fraser's Hill hope that the government will reintroduce bus services in this area in the nearest future.

== Telecommunications ==
As the population declined, so did newspaper sales and they became unavailable in town. Residents have to rely on television, the Internet, or read online newspapers to learn the latest news from around the world.

A UHF microwave base known as Kuala Lumpur–Fraser’s Hill was constructed in January 1971 that allowed wireless communication between Fraser’s Hill, Kuala Lumpur and the rest of the country. A digital television radio tower was constructed in Fraser’s Hill in 2017 that allowed residents in certain parts of the Pahang area near Fraser’s Hill to receive digital terrestrial television service provided by MYTV Broadcasting. In addition, several radio towers belonging to Telekom Malaysia, Maxis and Celcom were also installed in Fraser’s Hill which provides a mobile network to residents and visitors to Fraser’s Hill.

RTM launched 4 radio stations in Fraser's Hill such as Radio Klasik FM 90.9 MHz, Nasional FM 106.2 MHz, Ai FM 97.1 MHz and Pahang FM 102.2 MHz to cover Raub and Lurah Bilut where are a blind spot area of Gunung Ulu Kali coverage.

== Education ==
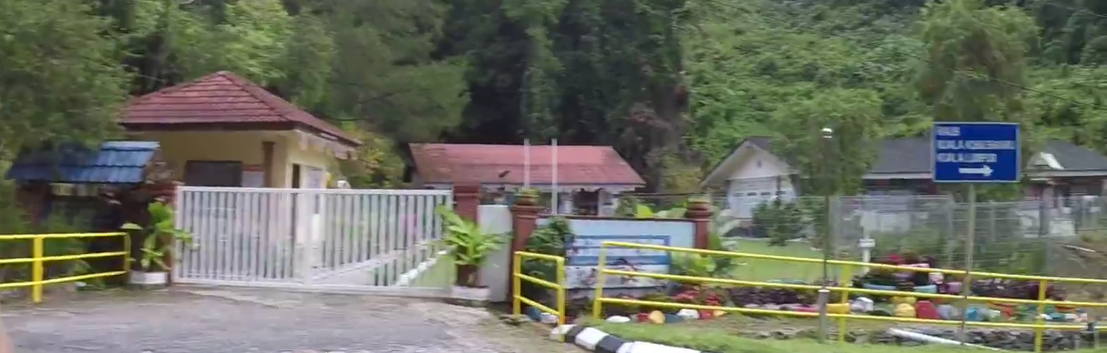
SJK (T) Bukit Fraser.

Fraser's Hill has two primary schools. SK Bukit Fraser and a Tamil school, SJK (T) Bukit Fraser. There used to be a Chinese primary school in this area, SJK (C) Bukit Fraser, which opened in 1938. Former Prime Minister of Singapore, Lee Kuan Yew attended the school to learn Chinese while on vacation in Fraser's Hill. However, the enrollment numbers in the last four years declined to the point where there was no new enrolment in the school leading it to be moved to Teluk Panglima Garang, Selangor in 2018. The new school retained the original name as well. The last student from the original SJK (C) Bukit Fraser graduated on 10 November 2018, which was also the official date of the school's closure. The closure led alumni to return to bid farewell to the original school. The new school in its new location is expected to be completed and open in 2021. While SJK (T) Bukit Fraser also faced low enrollment with only three students and four teachers as of 2018, the school continues to operate as usual. As Fraser's Hill lacks a high school, some students move to other towns with high schools such as Raub, Kuala Kubu Bharu and Kuala Lumpur.

== Culture ==
=== Birdwatching ===
Because the area is rich with diverse bird species, Fraser's Hill has become a notable place for birdwatching aficionados. Birdwatchers from Asia and Europe often visit Fraser's Hill to photograph and study the region's birds. The popularity of birdwatching has led to the creation of an annual event, Fraser's Hill Bird Race, which was first organised in 1988 by the Fraser's Hill Development Corporation and the Malaysian Nature Society. It is usually held in June. The objective is to spot, identify and record species in an official list within the given time limit. The event encourages the preservation of nature and promotes Fraser's Hill as a bird sanctuary. The event attracts participants from various countries and has added to the success of the tourism industry in Fraser's Hill.

Besides, a museum dedicated to birds known as the Bird Interpretive Centre was opened to the public in June 2010. The museum provides information and guided tours on seven trails in Fraser's Hill, and an interactive facility where visitors can learn more about the area's flora and fauna and understand the importance of forest conservation and the beauty of viewing nature.

=== Sports ===
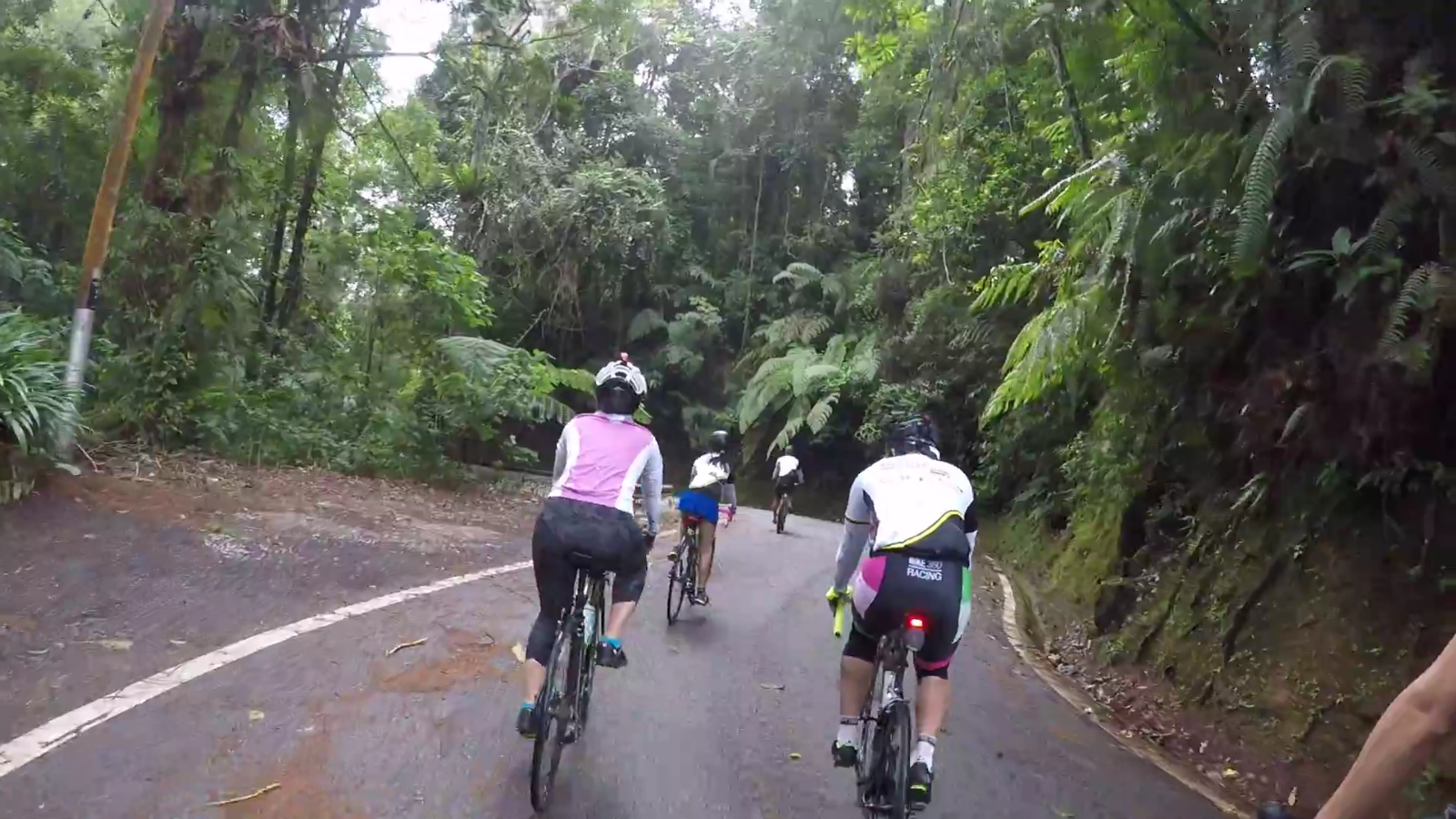
Cycling in Fraser's Hill.

Fraser's Hill has become a popular place for hikers to hike on the well maintained trails in Fraser's Hill. Because of the undisturbed nature of the trails, hikers are exposed to an array of flora and fauna. Hikers who took part in Fraser's Hill centenary celebrations did so to show support for its conservation. The trails are not actively promoted as part of Fraser's Hill tourism programme. The most popular trails for hikers are Bishop Trail, Rompin Trail, Maxwell Trail and Kindersley Trail.

In addition, Fraser's Hill has become a popular cycling area for both road cyclists and mountain bikers. The popularity of cycling in this area is reflected in the annual Fraser's Hill King of Mountain challenge which attracts more than a thousand cyclists. Fraser's Hill was also the site of several international professional road racing and Union Cycliste Internationale (UCI)-sanctioned racing events such as the Tour de Langkawi, Le Tour de Femina and the Malaysian National Road Championships.

Fraser's Hill is also home to one of the oldest golf courses in Malaysia. The nine-hole golf course was constructed in 1925 on a former tin mine which closed after the tin had depleted. A newer 18-hole golf course was built in Jeriau in 1970s. Several high-profile individuals and professional golfers including Tun Abdul Razak, Rodger Davis and Ahmad Shah of Pahang have played the golf course. Other sports activity in Fraser's Hill includes archery, paddle boating, horseback riding, tennis, swimming and squash.

=== Film ===
Kolej 56, a Malaysian period teen film, was filmed in both Fraser's Hill and Cameron Highlands in 1988. These locations were chosen to ensure the film had an authentic 1950s look.

Misteri Dilaila, a Malaysian horror film, was filmed at Fraser's Hill and was released in 2019. The storyline of the film, which involved the disappearance of some characters while on vacation at Fraser’s Hill, is believed to have been inspired by the disappearance of Louis James Fraser in 1910.
