= Arthur Scarf =

Recipient of the Victoria Cross

Arthur Stewart King Scarf
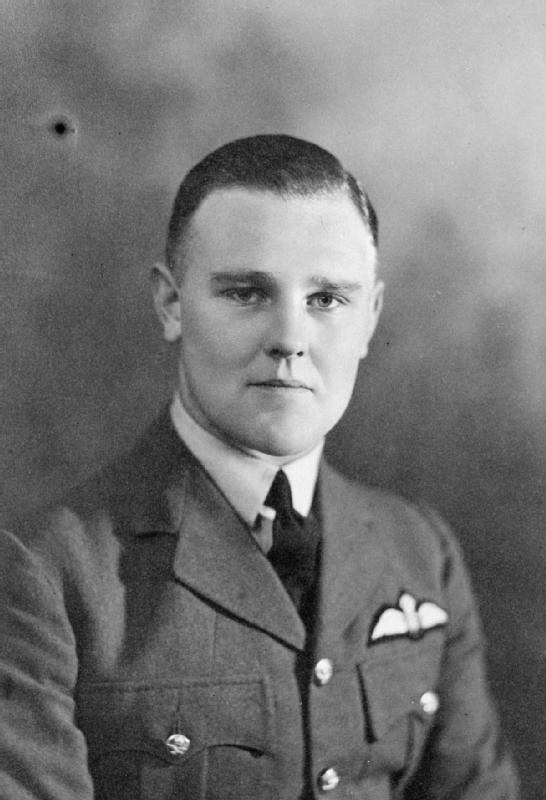
- Arthur Scarf in RAF uniform
- Born: 14 June 1913; Wimbledon, London, England
- Died: 9 December 1941 (aged 28); Alor Star, Kedah, British Malaya
- Burial place: Taiping War Cemetery
- Military career
- Allegiance: United Kingdom
- Branch: Royal Air Force
- Service years: 1936–1941
- Rank: Squadron Leader
- Nickname: Pongo
- Units: No. 62 Squadron RAF
- Conflicts: Second World War: Pacific War; Malayan campaign (DOW)
- Awards: Victoria Cross

Squadron Leader Arthur Stewart King Scarf, VC (14 June 1913 – 9 December 1941) was a Royal Air Force pilot and a recipient of the Victoria Cross, the highest award for gallantry in the face of the enemy that can be awarded to British and Commonwealth forces. He was the only member of the RAF to be awarded the VC for his actions in the Pacific War.

== Early life and career ==
Scarf attended King's College School in Wimbledon, and was a RAF Cranwell trained regular. Scarf joined the Royal Air Force (RAF) in 1936, and was accepted for pilot training. On gaining his wings he was posted to No. 9 Squadron, operating the Handley Page Heyford. In 1937 he transferred to No. 62 Squadron, a light bomber unit which received the Bristol Blenheim in February 1938. Just prior to the outbreak of the Second World War in September 1939, the squadron was detached to bases in northern Malaya. From July 1941, No. 62 Squadron was based at Alor Star near the Thailand border and at the outbreak of hostilities with Japan in December 1941 the squadron came under heavy air attack. On 9 December it was withdrawn to RAF Butterworth in order to regroup.

== Raid on Singora ==
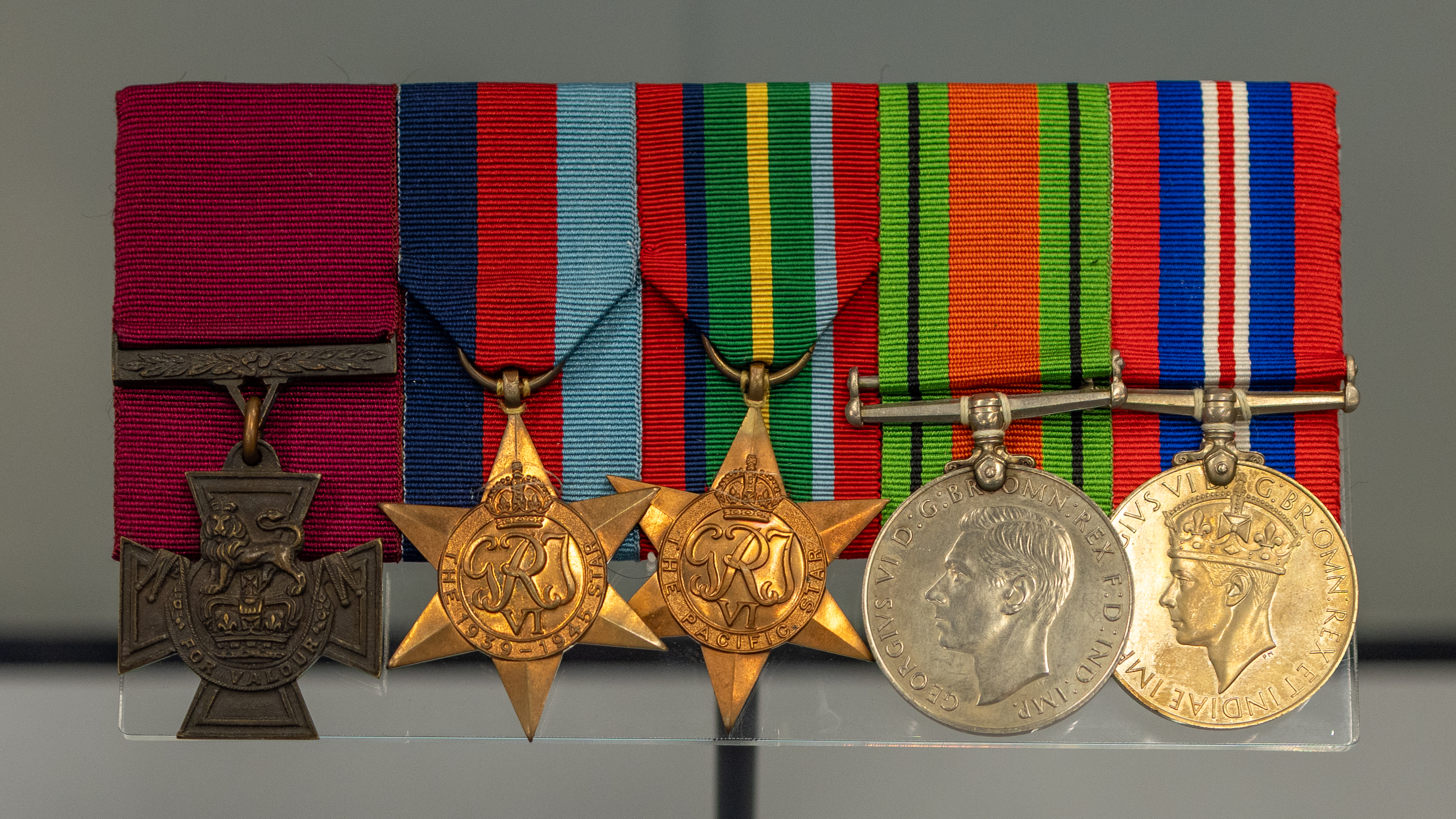
Medals, including Victoria Cross, displayed at the Royal Air Force Museum London

Scarf was 28 years old, and a squadron leader in No. 62 Squadron, when the following deed took place for which he was awarded the Victoria Cross.

On 9 December 1941 in Malaya, near the Thailand border, all available aircraft had been ordered to make a daylight raid on Singora (where the Imperial Japanese Army was invading). Squadron Leader Scarf, as leader of the raid, had just taken off from the base at Butterworth when enemy aircraft swept in destroying or disabling all the rest of the machines. Scarf decided nevertheless to fly alone to Singora. Despite attacks from roving fighters he completed his bombing run and was on his way back when his aircraft became riddled with bullets and he was severely wounded, his left arm had been shattered, he had a large hole in his back and was drifting in and out of consciousness. He managed to crash-land the Blenheim at Alor Star, without causing any injury to his crew, and was rushed to hospital where he died two hours later.

Scarf's Victoria Cross was not gazetted until June 1946. Because of the chaotic nature of the Malayan campaign, the facts concerning Scarf's actions were not known until after the war. At the time of his death he was about to become a father for the first time. His pregnant wife was a nurse based at the Alor Star hospital, but had just been evacuated south. The two other crewmen from Scarf's Blenheim were also given awards after the war for their courage during this action; Sergeant (later Squadron Leader) Paddy Calder was awarded a Distinguished Flying Medal and Sergeant Cyril Rich (killed in action in 1943) received a posthumous Mention in Despatches.

Squadron Leader Scarf (Service Number 37693) is buried in Grave 14, Row G, Section 2 of Taiping War Cemetery, Malaysia.

Scarf's Victoria Cross was displayed at the Royal Air Force Museum London, England. On 27 April 2022, the recipient's family placed the medal up for auction at Spink. It reportedly sold for a world record price of £682,000. On May 1, 2023, the RAF museum announced they had raised the funds to keep the Victoria Cross and medal bar and they will go on display in the museum.

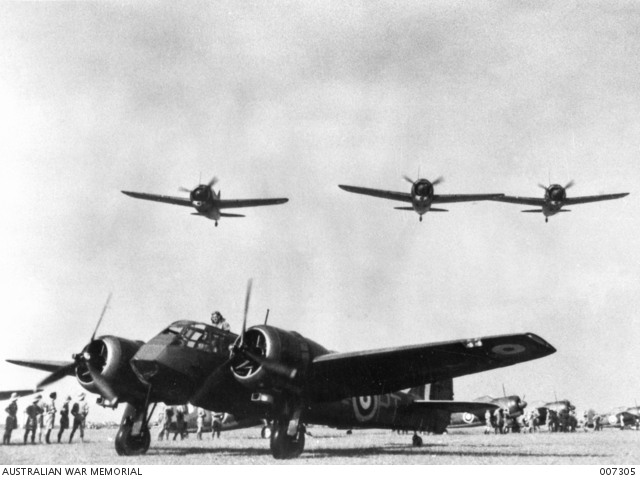
A Bristol Blenheim Mk I fighter believed to be from No. 27 Squadron at RAF Sembawang, Singapore, June 1941. Scarf's aircraft is now believed to be L1134 FX-F of No. 62 Squadron

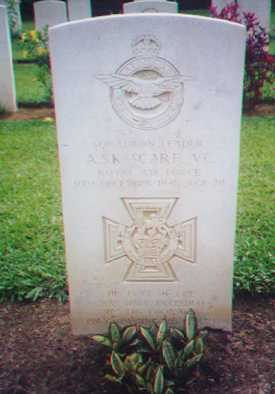
Scarf's headstone at Taiping War Cemetery
