= MRSM Terendak =

MARA Junior Science College Terendak
- Maktab Rendah Sains MARA Terendak
- MRSM Terendak Coat of Arms

Location
- Terendak Camp; Sungai Udang, Malacca City, Malacca, 76200; Malaysia
- Coordinates: 2°17′17″N 102°6′53″E

Information
- School type: Boarding school
- Motto: Berdisiplin, Berilmu, Beramal
- Established: 1983
- School district: Alor Gajah
- Principal: Kadir Bin Dewa
- Age range: 13 to 17
- Education system: MRSM
- Nickname: Terendakian
- Yearbook: Fajar
- Affiliation: Ministry of Defence
- Website: terendak.mrsm.edu.my

Maktab Rendah Sains MARA Terendak (commonly known as MRSM Terendak) is a member school of a group of co-educational boarding schools known as MRSM (abbreviation of Malay: Maktab Rendah Sains MARA) or alternatively known as MARA Junior Science College or MJSC. It is in Terendak Camp, Malacca in Malaysia. The school is on a 19-acre area in Terendak Camp which is the largest military camp in Malaysia. MRSM Terendak can accommodate up to 700 students from the age of 13 (Form 1) to 17 (Form 5).

== History ==
=== Establishment ===
MRSM Terendak was established in cooperation between Majlis Amanah Rakyat (MARA) and the Ministry of Defence. It shares the same vision and mission of MRSM but with a priority towards enrolling selected children from the military families.

The school began its operation in July 1983 with a total of 300 students, including students from MRSM Balik Pulau, Pulau Pinang. The first registration of MRSM Terendak students took place on July 23, 1983. In the first year of its inception, seven teachers were assigned to teach. The first principal was Asrokin bin Sanuji. His two sons, Azharuddin and Akmarizwan graduated from MRSM Terendak in 1994 and 1996 respectively when Mr. Asrokin was the principal at MRSM Jasin (now MRSM Tun Ghafar Baba), Malacca.

MRSM Terendak had its Silver Jubilee Celebration in 2008.

=== Inauguration ===
MRSM Terendak was inaugurated in 1993 by the Honourable Tun Ghafar Baba, who was then the Deputy Prime Minister of Malaysia.

== Campus ==
MSRM Terendak at its inception was made up of a big rectangle building which is known as the Academic Building that consists of 18 classrooms, a Teacher Work Room (Malay: Bilik Kerja Guru (BKG)), an Education Resource Centre (library) (Malay: Pusat Sumber Pembelajaran (PSP)), science labs, a gymnasium, and other rooms. At the centre of the Academic Building is a large hall named Malay: Dewan Budiman that can accommodate 700 people at one time.

The establishment of the student hostels was made in phases throughout the years with blocks A to G. Initially, the boys were placed in block A, while the girls were placed in block B. The student dining hall was next to a lake (now reduced to a proper drain) but the building is now used as a seminar room. The current student dining hall is adjacent to block E, and it is called Malay: Teres Teratai or Lotus Terrace. The PSP was used as a Prayer Hall before the current Musolla was built at the centre of the hostel area. There are several family houses for the teachers who are assigned as wardens.

== Notable alumni ==
The alumni association of MRSM Terendak is known as Persatuan Bekas Pelajar MRSM Terendak (ANSARA Terendak).

- Datuk Seri Razali Ibrahim (Politician, Ex-Minister)
- Datin Dr. Halina Yunos (Medical Doctor, Wife of the first Malaysian Astronaut - Sheikh Muszaphar Shukor)
- IR. Dr. Nadiahnor Md Yusop (Associate Professor UiTM)
- Captain Mushafiz Mustafa Bakri (CEO - Malindo Air)
