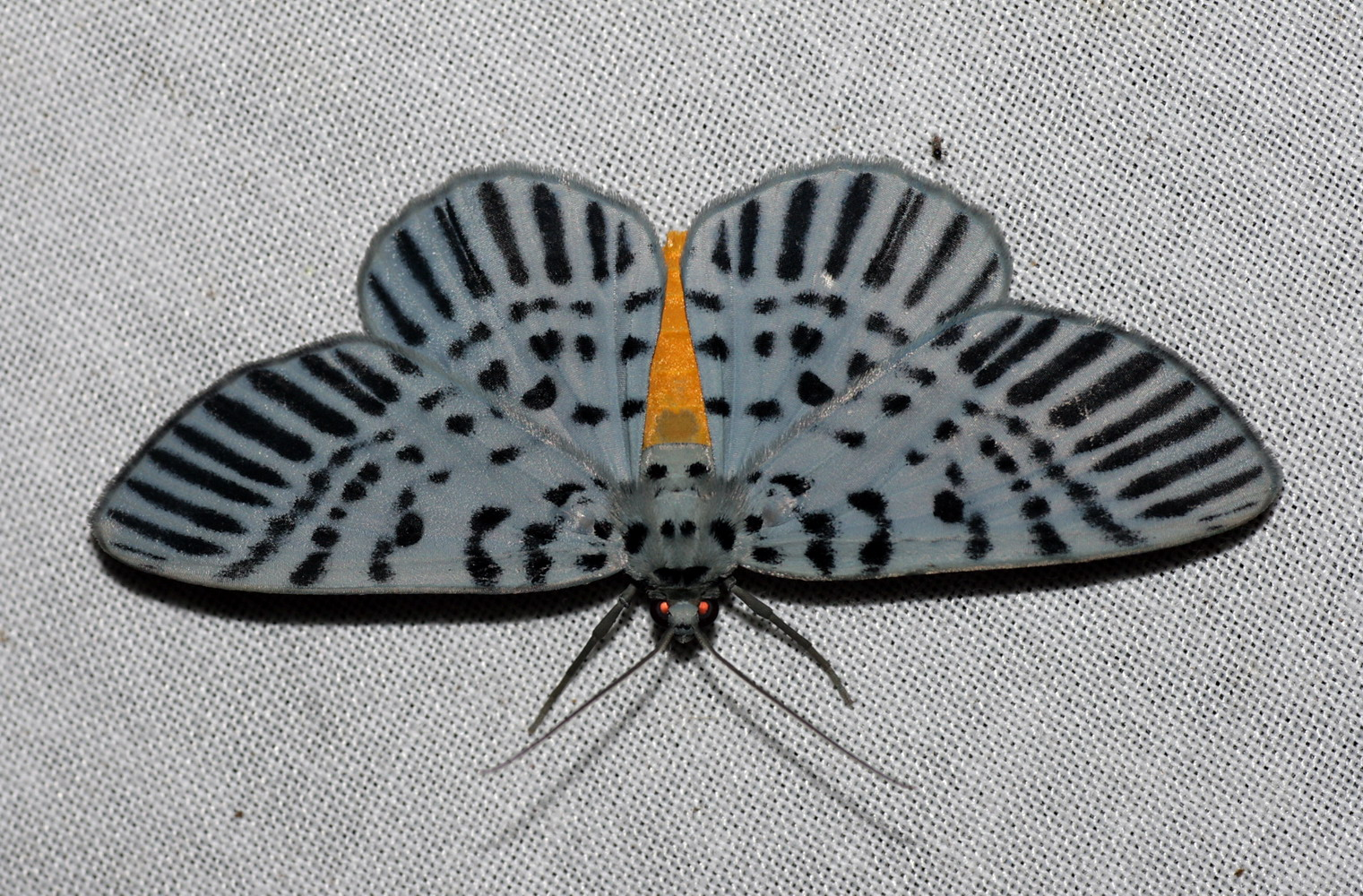

Scientific classification
- Domain: Eukaryota
- Kingdom: Animalia
- Phylum: Arthropoda
- Class: Insecta
- Order: Lepidoptera
- Family: Geometridae
- Subfamily: Ennominae
- Tribe: Boarmiini
- Genus: Bracca
- Species: B. subfumosa

Binomial name
- Bracca subfumosa (Warren, 1897)

Synonyms
- Arycanda subfumosa Warren, 1897

= Bracca subfumosa =

Species of moth

Bracca subfumosa is a moth of the family Geometridae. It is found in Borneo and Sumatra.
