= Sungai Udang =

Town in Central Melaka, Melaka, Malaysia

Coordinates: 2°16′N 102°09′E

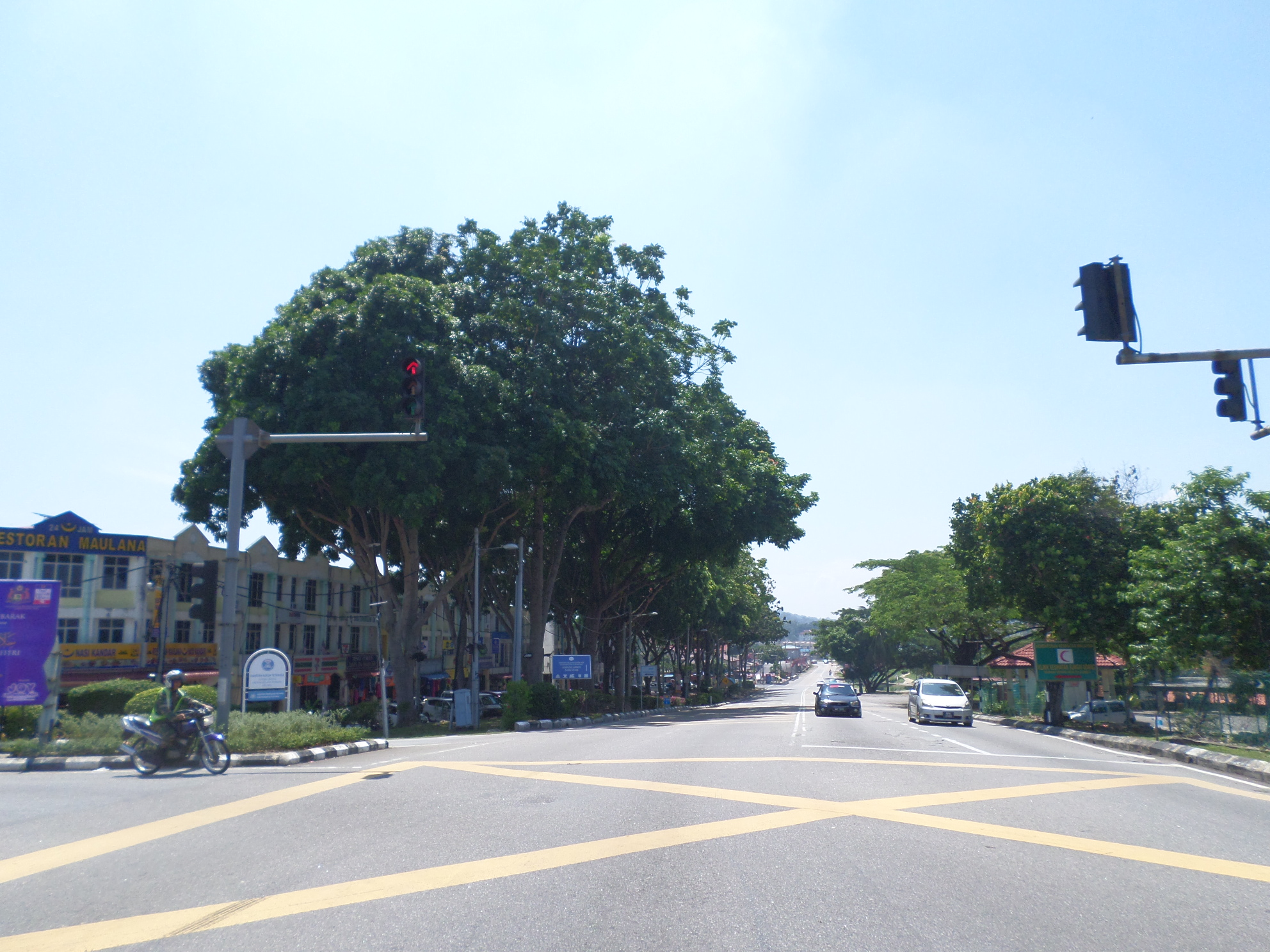
Sungai Udang

Sungai Udang is a mukim and town in Melaka Tengah, Malacca, Malaysia. It is situated within the parliamentary constituency of Tangga Batu.

== Education ==
Name	Description
MRSM Terendak	A member school of a group of co-educational boarding schools known as MRSM (abbreviation of Malay: Maktab Rendah Sains MARA) or alternatively known as MARA Junior Science College or MJSC. The school is located on a 19-acre area in Terendak Camp.

== Military bases ==
Name	Description
Terendak Camp	The largest military camp in Malaysia.

== Tourist attractions ==
Image	Name	Description
	Melaka Tropical Fruit Farm	Fruit Farm.
	Sungai Udang Recreational Forest	A lowland dipterocarp forest under the management of the State Forestry Department, it was declared a reserved area in 1987 with an area of 55 hectares.

== See also ==
- List of cities and towns in Malaysia by population
