= Assassination of Sir Henry Gurney =

1951 assassination in Malaysia

- Part of Malayan Emergency
Date	6 October 1951
Location	Fraser's Hill, Pahang, Malaya
Result	Communist victory • Sir Henry Gurney assassinated.

Belligerents
United Kingdom	Malayan Communist Party

Commanders and leaders
(United Kingdom) Sir Henry Gurney X	Sui Mah; Chin Peng

Strength
13 policemen	38 insurgents

Casualties and losses
2 killed 5 wounded	None

The Assassination of Sir Henry Gurney took place on 6 October 1951 at the height of the Malayan Emergency. Gurney, the British High Commissioner in Malaya, was killed by members of the Malayan Communist Party at Mile 56 ½ of Kuala Kubu Road on his way to Fraser's Hill for a meeting.

Gurney was riding in his Rolls-Royce Silver Wraith with his wife, private secretary D. J. Staples, and his Malayan chauffeur as part of a convoy that included an armoured scout car, a police wireless van, and a Land-Rover with six Malayan policemen sitting in its open back. Eight miles from the ambush site, the wireless van developed engine trouble, and the commander advised Gurney to wait, but Gurney decided to press ahead with the rest of the convoy.

About 60 miles (97 km) north of Kuala Lumpur, as the convoy rounded a curve in the road, it was ambushed by a force of 38 Malayan Communist Party guerrillas, who opened fire on the convoy with three Bren guns, Sten guns, and rifles. Gurney and five of the six Malayan policemen in the Land-Rover were wounded, and his chauffeur was killed. Both vehicles came to a halt as bullets punctured their tyres. Gurney pushed his wife and private secretary into the footwell of the car, then got out and staggered forward towards the ambush site to draw the insurgents' fire away from the car and towards himself. The guerrillas fired in his direction, fatally hitting him.

The armoured scout car pushed ahead of the Rolls-Royce with some difficulty to get help from a nearby police station. The insurgents stayed in the area for about ten more minutes, firing intermittently at anything that moved. A bugle call then sounded, and the insurgents pulled back.

When the firing eased, Lady Gurney crawled out of the Rolls-Royce, only to discover her husband's body lying in a roadside ditch. Twenty minutes later, the officer in charge of the armoured scout car arrived at the scene with reinforcements from the police station.

According to Communist leader Chin Peng, the ambush was routine, the killing by chance, and the guerrillas only learned the High Commissioner was among the dead from news reports.
