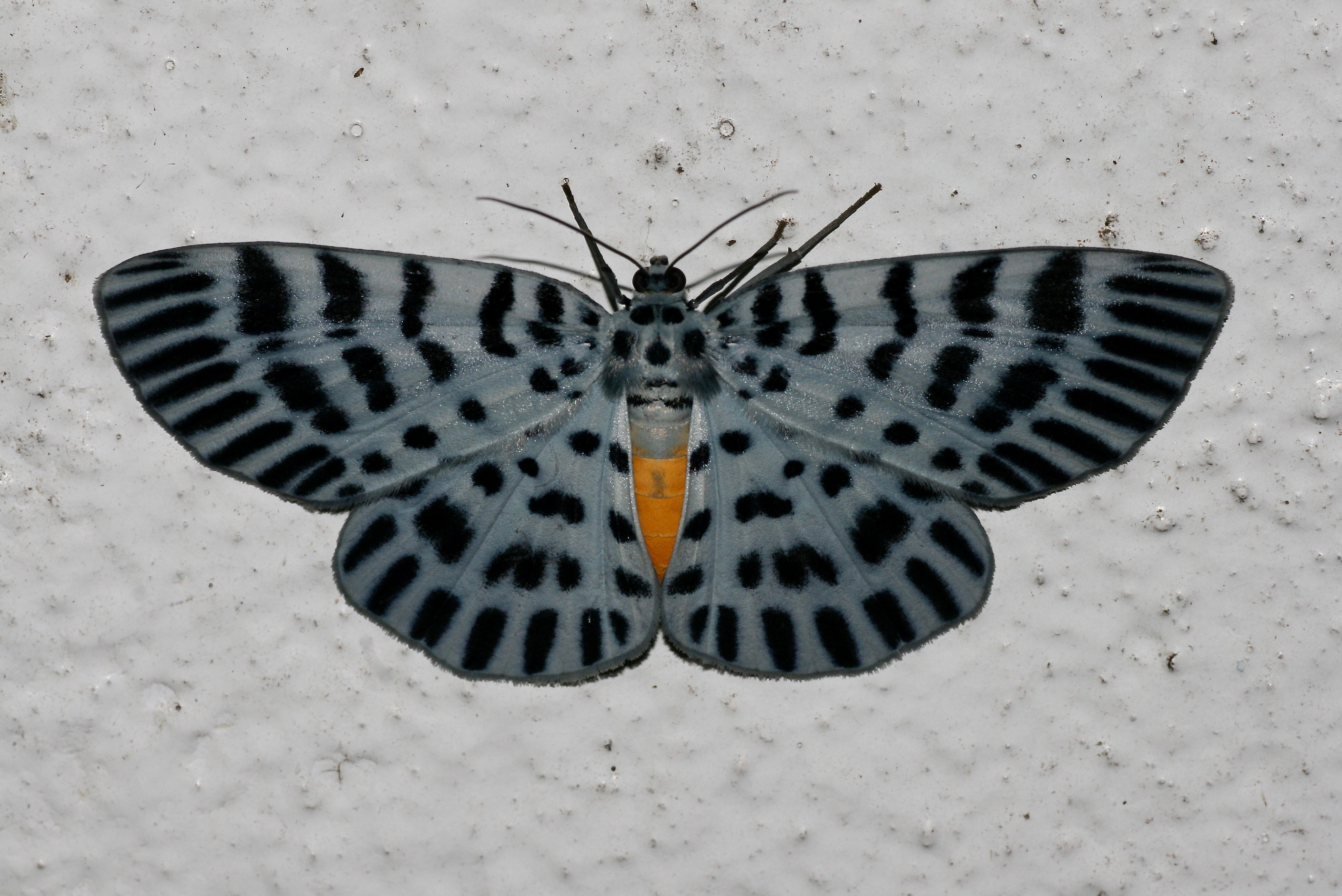

Scientific classification
- Kingdom: Animalia
- Phylum: Arthropoda
- Clade: Pancrustacea
- Class: Insecta
- Order: Lepidoptera
- Family: Geometridae
- Subfamily: Ennominae
- Tribe: Boarmiini
- Genus: Bracca; Hübner, [1820]

Synonyms
- Cosmethis Hübner, [1820]; Tigridoptera Herrich-Schäffer, [1855]; Tigridoptera Herrich-Schäffer, [1856]; Arycanda Walker, 1856; Panaethia Guenée, 1857; Duga Walker, [1865]

= Bracca (moth) =

Genus of moths

Bracca is a genus of moths in the family Geometridae erected by Jacob Hübner in 1820.

== Species ==
- Bracca bajularia (Clerck, 1764)
- Bracca barbara (Stoll, [1781])
- Bracca emolliens (Walker, 1865)
- Bracca exul (Herrich-Schäffer, [1856])
- Bracca georgiata (Guenée, 1857)
- Bracca maculosa (Walker, 1856)
- Bracca matutinata (Walker, 1862)
- Bracca ribbei (Pagenstecher, 1886)
- Bracca rosenbergi (Pagenstecher, 1886)
- Bracca rotundata (Butler, 1877)
- Bracca subfumosa (Warren, 1897)
