= Kuala Lumpur and Selangor Chinese Assembly Hall =

Nonprofit building in Kuala Lumpur

- Dewan Perhimpunan China Kuala Lumpur Dan Selangor; 吉隆坡暨雪兰莪中华大会堂
- The building in 2014

General information
- Architectural style: Neoclassical
- Location: No.1, Jalan Maharajalela, 50150 Kuala Lumpur, Malaysia
- Coordinates: 3°8′21″N 101°41′53″E
- Completed: 1934
- Cost: 200,000 Straits dollars

Design and construction
- Architect: Berthel Michael Iversen

Website
- klscah.org.my

The Kuala Lumpur and Selangor Chinese Assembly Hall (KLSCAH; Dewan Perhimpunan China Kuala Lumpur Dan Selangor; 吉隆坡暨雪兰莪中华大会堂 (隆雪华堂)), formerly the Selangor Chinese Assembly Hall (SCAH; Dewan Perhimpunan China Selangor; 雪兰莪中华大会堂 (雪华堂)), is a community centre and associated nonprofit management group in Kuala Lumpur, Malaysia. Constructed to provide a communal space for the growing ethnic Chinese population of Kuala Lumpur and wider Selangor during British rule, the building played an important role in the lead-up to independence, being the site of the founding of the Malaysian Chinese Association and the later establishment of an electoral pact between that political party and the United Malays National Organisation. Following independence, the KLSCAH continued to advocate for issues relating to the Malaysian Chinese community, as well as larger national issues.

The KLSCAH building is an example of neoclassical architecture. It originally sat on a larger plot of land, with its surrounding land later being acquired for infrastructure. It is a listed national heritage site, and continues to serve as a communal centre and event space.

== History ==
Around the turn of the 20th century, the ethnic Chinese population of Kuala Lumpur was growing rapidly. This created a need for a central body that could handle issues such as marriages and organise cultural activities. The site of the building was originally set aside for tin miners. Its purpose was changed after Loke Yew suggested the site could host a communal space for all ethnic Chinese. Loke Yew and his family contributed 90,000 of the 200,000 Straits dollars needed to fund construction. Construction on the building began in 1910, and the SCAH organisation was founded in 1923. (At this time, Kuala Lumpur was part of Selangor rather than being a separate territory.) Due to financing issues and disputes, such as whether to name the main hall after Loke Yew or Sun Yat-sen, construction was slow, only finishing in 1934.

The building went on to serve as a meeting point for Chinese societies, allowing these societies to meet at a venue not defined by familial or occupational ties. During the Second World War, the building was occupied by Japanese forces. Following the war, the SCAH became involved in establishing war memorials.

During discussions about the possible independence of British Malaya, SCAH advocated for the full citizenship of the ethnic Chinese. The Malaysian Chinese Association was founded in the building. In 1952, the building was the site of discussions that led to an electoral alliance between the Malaysian Chinese Association and the United Malays National Organisation. In the year following the independence of Malaya, the SCAH helped ethnic Chinese individuals, many of whom did not speak Malay, navigate the citizenship process.

Following independence, the SCAH continued to advocate for changes in economic and social policies. The building served as a relief centre during the 13 May incident in 1969. Following this, the SCAH played an important role in the Malaysian Chinese community's response to the Malaysian New Economic Policy and simultaneous limitations on Chinese cultural expression. Before it was replaced by a deliberately created national organisation, the SCAH served as a focal point for Chinese societies in other Malaysian states.

Women's and youth wings were established in 1985. In 1987, the SCAH began advocating for the release of those arrested as part of Operation Lalang. Over time, the SCAH's advocacy efforts extended beyond exclusively Malaysian Chinese issues to broader concerns about national policy and minority groups. UMNO Youth protested outside the building in opposition to the SCAH's electoral views in 1999.

A KLSCAH history society began an annual remembrance ceremony at the Kwong Tong Cemetery in 1995. This marks the fall of Kuala Lumpur to Japanese forces during the Malayan campaign on 11 January 1942.

In 2003, a separate Kuala Lumpur Assembly Hall (itself renamed in 2023 to the Malaysian Chinese Assembly Hall) was established, leading to protests from the SCAH. In 2006, the SCAH was officially renamed to the current Kuala Lumpur and Selangor Chinese Assembly Hall.

The Malaysian government confirmed that the SCAH building would become heritage-listed in June 2005, and that the government would fund restoration. The building was among the initial set of listings, which occurred in 2007.

The cultural relevance of the KLSCAH to the wider Malaysian Chinese community decreased over time. In 2018, work began to open a museum within the building. In February 2026, Prime Minister Anwar Ibrahim called for the building's preservation while attending Chinese New Year celebrations there. The organisation had reported an annual deficit of RM400,000, and sought government assistance with tax and quit-rent. The current title to the property will expire in 2034.

== Structure ==
Roads have been built on land formerly belonging to the building, resulting in a former side door now serving as the main entrance

The building was built along Jalan Maharajalela in central Kuala Lumpur. The design is representative of neoclassical architecture, intended to appear modern at the time of its construction. The Singaporean architectural firm behind it (today named BEP Akitek Sdn Bhd) hired Berthel Michael Iversen to design the building. Some internal elements came from Rodolfo Nolli. The original plot of land the building was built on was much larger; however, land surrounding the building was later acquired by the government and used to build roads. The building's current main entrance was originally a side entrance.

== Management ==
The KLSCAH is a listed heritage site under the National Heritage Act 2005. It is open to the public, and operates as a nonprofit. The society's income comes primarily from fundraising, with smaller amounts coming from building rental and donations. The building hosts events including the Kuala Lumpur Art Book Fair and the KL Zine Fest. It has served as a multi-ethnic wedding venue, with patrons including a Sultan of Selangor and a prime minister.
