= Cheras Christian Cemetery =

Cemetery in Kuala Lumpur, Malaysia

- Interactive map of Cheras Christian Cemetery

Details
- Established: 1900
- Location: Jalan Kuari, Cheras, Kuala Lumpur
- Country: Malaysia
- Coordinates: 3°06′32″N 101°44′21″E
- Type: Public Christian cemetery
- Owned by: Dewan Bandaraya Kuala Lumpur (DBKL)
- Size: 50 acres
- No. of graves: 22,500
- Find a Grave: Cheras Christian Cemetery

The Cheras Christian Cemetery is the largest Christian Cemetery in Malaysia. The cemetery is located in Cheras, Kuala Lumpur and was opened in 1900. The cemetery has a capacity of 22,000 burial plots, all of which were full by January 2012.

The Cheras War Cemetery is located nearby.

== Notable burials ==
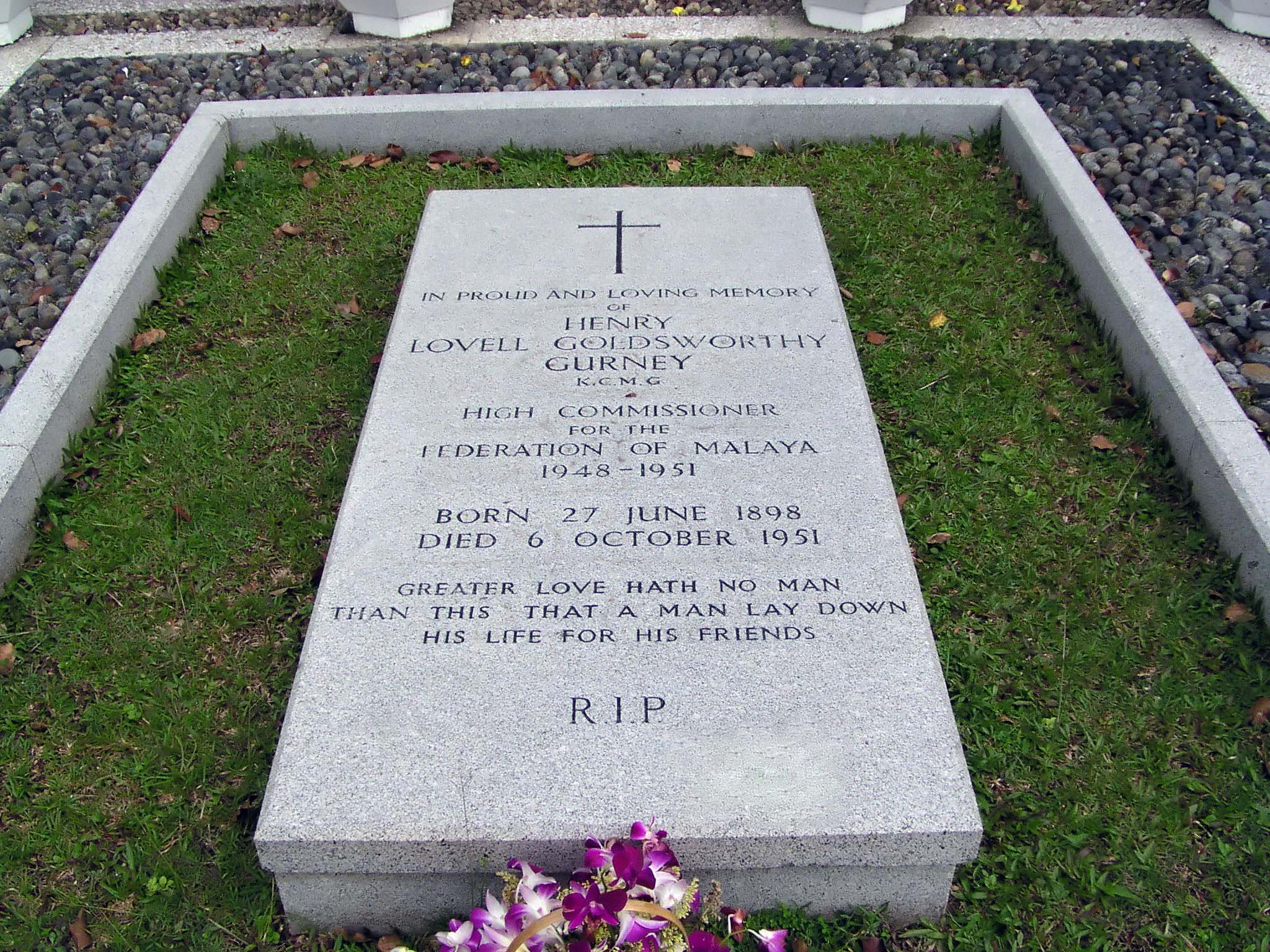
Sir Henry Gurney's grave

- Sir Henry Gurney – British High Commissioner in Malaya.
- Samantha Schubert – Miss Malaysia World 1991
- George Abraham – former RTM producer, newsreader and radio presenter

== Issues ==
=== Insufficient burial space ===
As of 2015, the 22,500 burial plots have been taken up due to high demands from the community and the allocated space by the management failed to meet all the burial requests.

=== Records management problem ===
Cases was reported in 2012, whereby a family which had bought their plots next to their father's grave, was shocked to discover a newly-laid tombstone on their plots. Similarly in 2017, burial plots – bought and paid in 1954, were found to be occupied by new graves.
