= Kwong Tong Cemetery =

Cemetery in Kuala Lumpur, Malaysia

Kwong Tong Cemetery is the largest and oldest cemetery located in Bukit Petaling, Kuala Lumpur, Malaysia. It covers an approximate area of 333 acres of land and is the final resting place of many notable pioneers in Malaysia. In 2007, the 112-year-old cemetery was named a Heritage Park.

The park was opened in 1895.

== Notable graves ==
=== Kapitan Cina of Kuala Lumpur ===
- Kapitan Yap Ah Loy (1837–1885)
- Kapitan Yap Kwan Seng (1846–1902)

=== Prominent People ===
- Cheong Yoke Choy (1873-1958)
- Lim Lian Geok - 林连玉
- Chan Sow Lin

== Memorials ==
=== Nanyang Volunteers Memorial ===
Beside individual graves, the Kwong Tong Cemetery also has a memorial. The Nanyang Volunteers Memorial, which was erected in 1947, honors the contributions of some 3,200 volunteers from Nanyang, modern-day South East Asia. These men and women served as drivers and mechanics for the Chinese during the Second Sino-Japanese War, helping the transportation of war materials into China. These men and women, known collectively as the Nanyang Volunteers, served from February to September 1939.

=== The Japanese War Memorial ===
Occupying 10,000 square feet, this memorial site is a mass grave of those killed during the Japanese occupation. The remains of nearly a thousand victims were exhumed from the Tomb of War Victims of the Compatriots of the Republic of China and relocated here. The memorial is in the Hokkien area, next to Kerayong road. It is not known who erected the monument in 1946. Members of the Kuala Lumpur and Selangor Chinese Assembly Hall's World War II society were planning a monument before coming across the existing one. Beginning in 1995, an annual ceremony has been held at the monument on 11 January to commemorate the fall of Kuala Lumpur to Japanese forces (except from 2021-2023).
