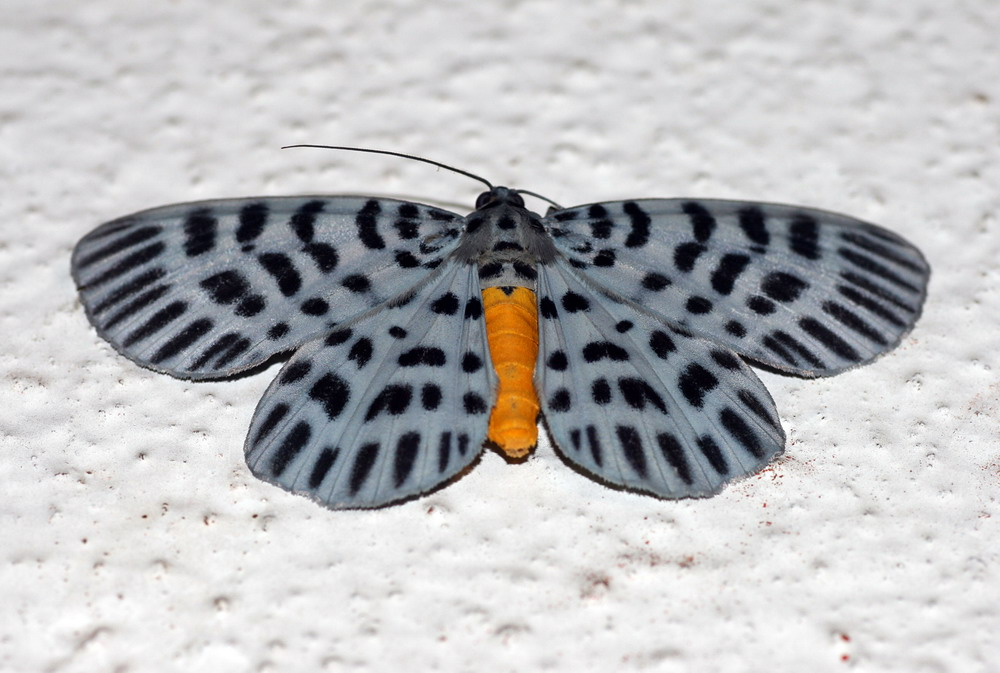

Scientific classification
- Kingdom: Animalia
- Phylum: Arthropoda
- Class: Insecta
- Order: Lepidoptera
- Family: Geometridae
- Subfamily: Ennominae
- Tribe: Boarmiini
- Genus: Bracca
- Species: B. maculosa

Binomial name
- Bracca maculosa (Walker, 1856)

Synonyms
- Arycanda maculosa Walker, 1856; Arycanda absorpta Warren 1897; Arycanda omissa Warren, 1897; Tigridoptera radiolata Warren, 1897; Arycanda apicinigra Bastelberger, 1911

= Bracca maculosa =

Species of moth

Bracca maculosa is a moth of the family Geometridae. It is found in Sumatra, Peninsular Malaysia, Borneo and Palawan.

== Subspecies ==
- Bracca maculosa maculosa (Sumatra, Peninsular Malaysia, Borneo)
- Bracca maculosa radiolata (Palawan)
