= Taiping War Cemetery =

CWGC cemetery in Perak, Malaysia

- Commonwealth War Graves Commission
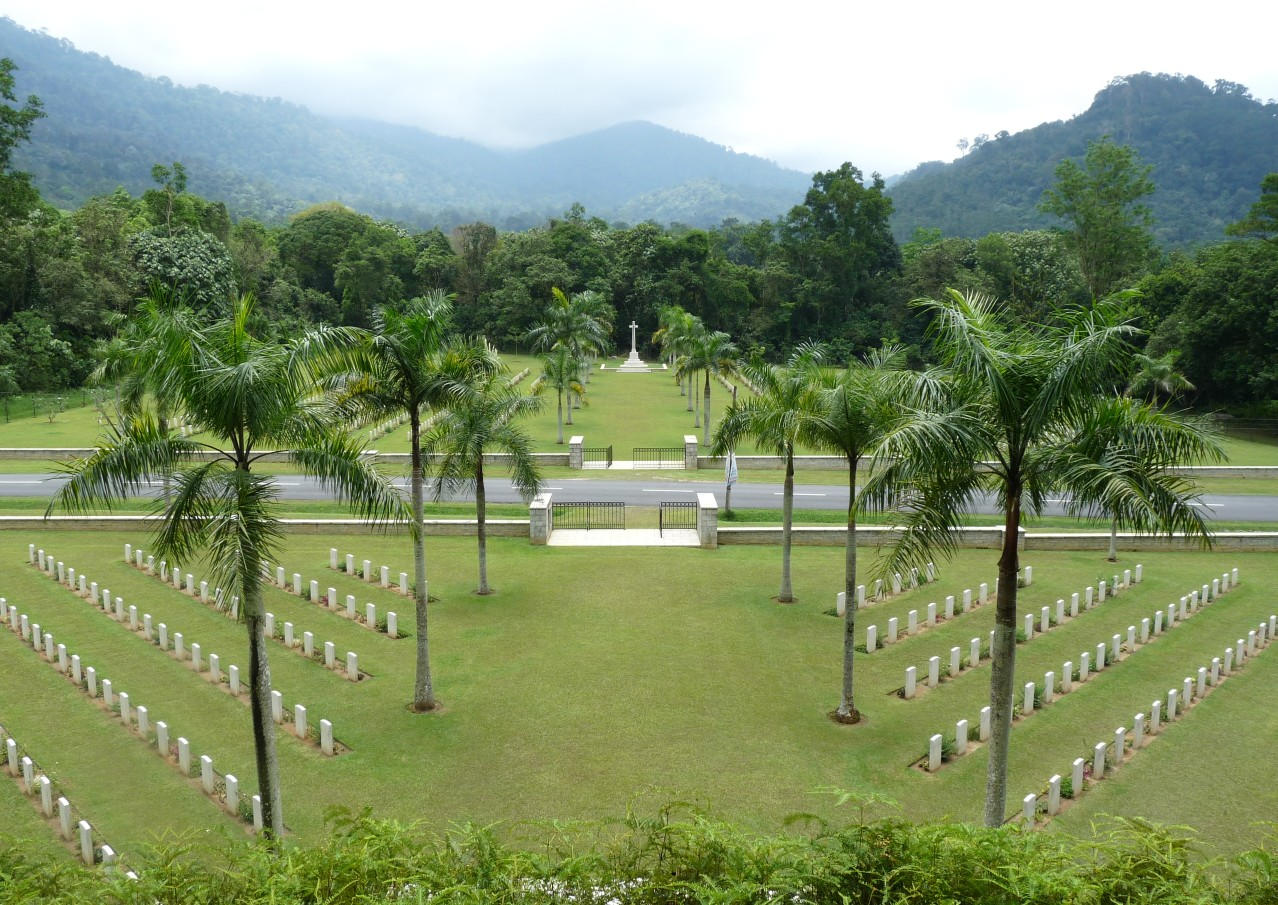
- Used for those deceased 1939–1945
- Established: 1946
- Location: 4°51′31″N 100°45′27″E near Taiping, Perak, Malaysia
- Designed by: J. H. Ingram
- Total burials: Over 850
- Unknowns: Over 500

Burials by nation
- Specific figures are not available

Burials by war
- World War II: Over 850

The Taiping War Cemetery (Malay: Tanah Perkuburan Perang Taiping) is the final resting place for Allied personnel who were killed during World War II, particularly the Malayan Campaign and the Japanese occupation of Malaya following the British occupation and colonization of Malaya. Servicemen who died after the war or during their posting in northern Malaya prior to the Malayan Emergency are also interred here. The cemetery is located in Bukit Larut, Taiping, Perak, Malaysia and was erected and maintained by the Commonwealth War Graves Commission.

There are more than 850 World War II casualties commemorated in this cemetery, including more than 500 who remain unidentified.

== History ==
=== The Malayan Campaign ===
Taiping was on the British line of retreat during the Japanese attempt to overtake the control of Malay Peninsula from the British along the West Coast of the peninsular. Normally hosting a garrison of one Indian Army infantry battalion, the forces in Taiping had been augmented with a casualty receiving station set up and the Indian 20th Combined General Hospital had been posted there.

The town was also used as a rest and refitting centre for the 6th and 15th Indian Infantry Brigade during the ongoing battles in northern Malaya with numerous medical units being stationed there before retreating towards Singapore.

=== Erection of the cemetery ===
After the surrender of Japan and the ending of World War II, the task of identifying of British and Commonwealth war dead in the area was assigned to Major J. H. Ingram who led a War Graves Registration Unit. He designed and supervised the erection of the cemetery for the reception of graves brought from the battlefields, from numerous temporary burial grounds, and from village and other civil cemeteries where permanent maintenance would not be possible.

== Layout ==
The cemetery is divided into two parts with Christian graves located on the southeastern side of the road while non-Christian graves being located on the opposite side. On the Christian section, a Cross of Sacrifice stands on the southeastern boundary while on the non-Christian section, a Stone of Remembrance stands on the northwestern boundary.

A stone dwarf wall flanks both sides of Jalan Bukit Larut, a road which forms the boundary between the Christian and non-Christian sections of the cemetery.

The graves are marked with an upright white granite headstone depicting the deceased's regimental insignia, if known. Muslim graves are aligned facing Mecca as required by their religious convictions.

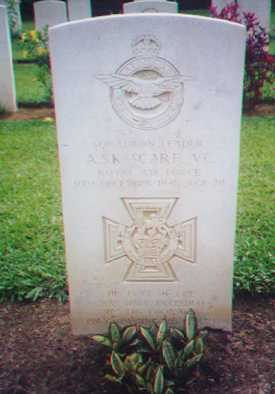
Headstone of Sqn Ldr A. S. K. Scarf VC

== Notable graves ==
- Royal Air Force Squadron Leader, Arthur Stewart King Scarf VC (1913–1941). He was one of the first RAF fatalities in Malaya and was awarded the Victoria Cross posthumously.

== See also ==
- Cheras War Cemetery
- Kranji War Cemetery
- Labuan War Cemetery
- Terendak Garrison Cemetery
