= Cheras War Cemetery =

Allied war cemetery in Malaysia

- Commonwealth War Graves Commission
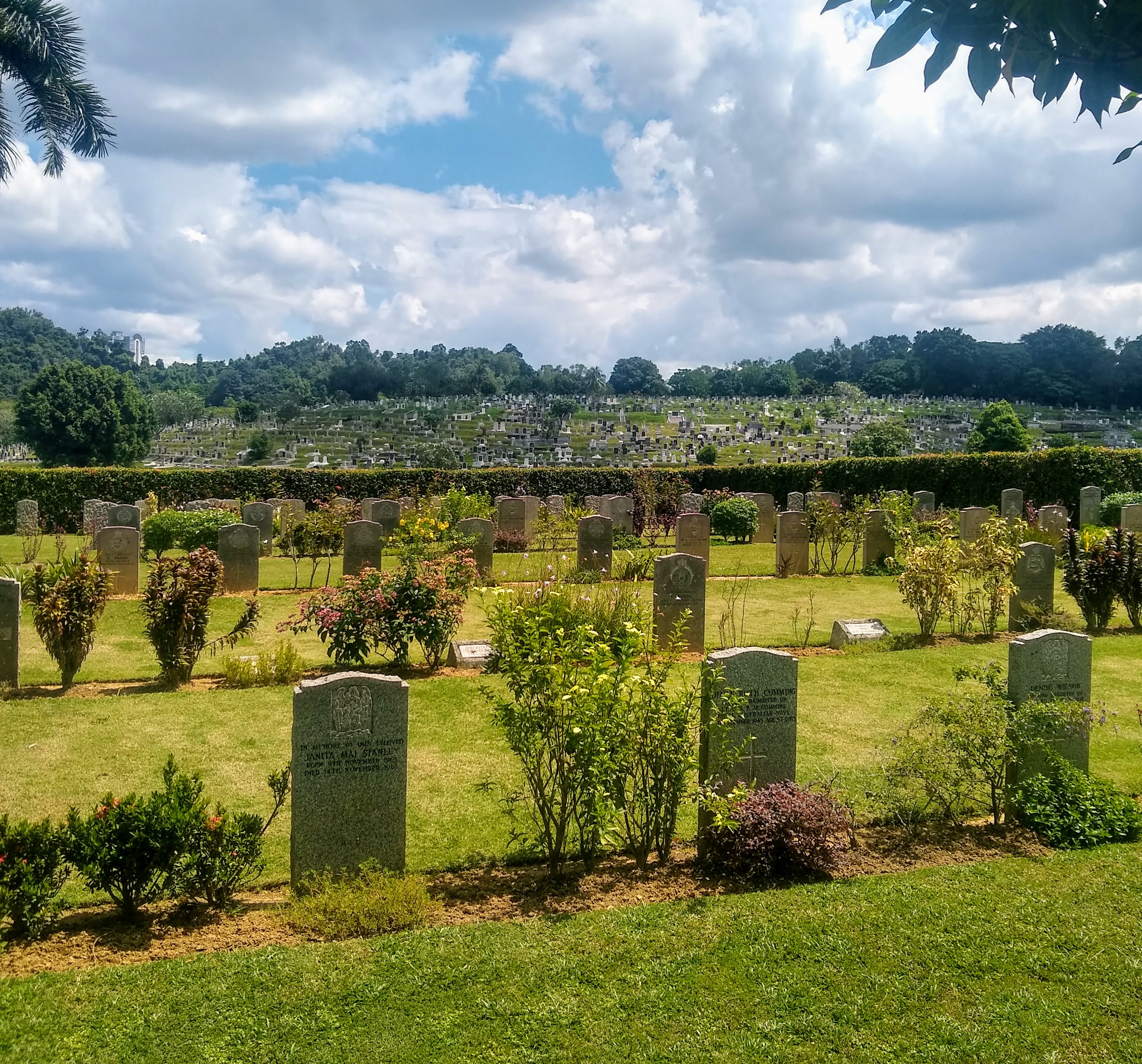
- Used for those deceased 1939–1945
- Established: 1946
- Location: 3.1070°N 101.7316°E near Cheras, Kuala Lumpur, Malaysia
- Total burials: 156 war dead, plus >600 non-war dead

Burials by nation
- Specific figures are not available.

Burials by war
- World War II

The Cheras War Cemetery (Malay: Tanah Perkuburan Perang Cheras) is the final resting place for Allied personnel who were killed during World War II, particularly the Malayan Campaign and the Japanese occupation of Malaya. Servicemen who died after the war or during their posting in northern Malaya prior to the Malayan Emergency are also interred here.

The cemetery is located near Cheras Christian Cemetery, along national highway 1, and was erected and maintained by the Commonwealth War Graves Commission.

== Notable burials ==
- Remains of the Royal Air Force personnel in the RAF Dakota C4 crash at Gua Musang, Kelantan on 25 August 1950 (relocated on 15 March 2012)
- Remains of the Royal Air Force personnel in the RAF B-24 Liberator KL654/R crash at the vicinities of Mount Telapak Buruk, Negeri Sembilan in August 1945 (relocated on 18 October 2012)

== Access ==
KG24 Taman Midah MRT Station

== See also ==
- Taiping War Cemetery
- Kranji War Cemetery
- Labuan War Cemetery
