= Frasor =

Frasor is a surname. Notable people with the surname include:

- Bobby Frasor (born 1986), American basketball player and coach
- Jason Frasor (born 1977), American baseball player

== See also ==
- Frasier (disambiguation)
- Fraser (disambiguation)
- Frazer (disambiguation)
- Frazier
