= Fraser =

Fraser may refer to:

== Places ==
=== Antarctica ===
- Fraser Point, South Orkney Islands

=== Australia ===
- Fraser, Australian Capital Territory, a suburb in the Canberra district of Belconnen
- Division of Fraser (Australian Capital Territory), a former federal electoral division located in the Australian Capital Territory
- Division of Fraser (Victoria), a current federal electoral division located in Victoria
- Fraser Island, along the coast of Queensland

=== Canada ===
- Fraser River
  - Fraser Plateau, a subplateau of the Interior Plateau, named for the river
  - Fraser Basin, a low-lying area, part of the Nechako Plateau, flanking the Fraser River in the Central Interior of British Columbia
  - Fraser Canyon, the stretch of the Fraser River from the city of Williams Lake south to the town of Hope, British Columbia
  - Fraser Valley, the region flanking the lowermost reaches of the Fraser River, from the town of Hope to the sea
  - Fraser Plateau and Basin complex, a World Wildlife Fund-named ecoregion in the Central Interior of British Columbia
- Fraser, British Columbia, a location on the Klondike Highway
- Fraser, Edmonton, a neighbourhood
- Alex Fraser Bridge, between Delta and Richmond, British Columbia
- Fraser Range, a small mountain range north of Nugent Sound on the Central Coast of British Columbia
- Fraser Lake, British Columbia, a village in northern British Columbia

=== Malaysia ===
- Fraser's Hill, Pahang

=== United States ===
- Fraser, Colorado
- Fraser, Idaho
- Fraser, Iowa
- Fraser, Michigan, in Macomb County
- Fraser Township, Michigan, in Bay County
- Fraser Township, Minnesota
- Fraser, New York (disambiguation), various places

== People ==
- Fraser (surname)
- Clan Fraser, a Scottish clan
- Clan Fraser of Lovat, a Scottish clan, distinct from the above
- Fraser Anning (born 1949), an Australian politician
- Fraser Barron (1921–1944), an officer of the Royal New Zealand Air Force
- Fraser Forster (born 1988), English footballer
- Fraser Wilkins (1908–1989), United States diplomat

== Other uses ==
- Fraser fir, the tree species Abies fraseri
- FRASER (Federal Reserve Archival System for Economic Research), a digital archive of the economic history of the United States maintained by the Federal Reserve Bank of St. Louis

== See also ==
- Bethel School District v. Fraser, a US legal case
- Fraser alphabet
- Fraser Institute, a free-market think tank
- Fraser and Neave, a Singapore-based business group
- Fraser syndrome, an autosomal recessive congenital disorder
- Frazier (disambiguation)
- Frazer (disambiguation)
- Frasier (disambiguation)
- Bukit Fraser (disambiguation)
- Justice Fraser (disambiguation)
- Fraisier, a French dessert
