= Frasier (disambiguation) =

Frasier is an American television sitcom.

Frasier may also refer to:

== People ==
- Anne Frasier (born c. 1950s), American author
- Margo Frasier (fl. c. late 20th century), American jurist and law-enforcement specialist
- Mary M. Frasier (1938–2005), American psychologist
- Scottie McKenzie Frasier (1884–1964), American teacher, writer, lecturer and suffragist

== Other uses ==
- Frasier (2023 TV series), a revival of the original series Frasier
- Frasier Crane, a fictional character on television sitcoms Frasier and Cheers
- Frasier syndrome, a genetic abnormality
- Frasier (lion), a captive lion at Lion Country Safari in California

== See also ==
- Fraser (disambiguation)
- Frazer (disambiguation)
- Frazier (disambiguation)
- Fraisier, a French dessert
