= Frazier =

Frazier may refer to:

== People ==
- Frazier (surname)

== Places ==
=== Cities ===
- Frazier Island, Nunavut
- Frazier, Georgia
- Frazier, Missouri
- Frazier Park, California
- Frazier Park (Charlotte, North Carolina)

=== Other places ===
- Frazier History Museum in Louisville, Kentucky
- Frazier School District in Western Pennsylvania
- R.T. Frazier House, NRHP-listed

== See also ==
- Frazer (disambiguation)
- Fraser (disambiguation)
- Frasier (disambiguation)
