= Bukit Fraser (disambiguation) =

Bukit Fraser may refer to:

- Fraser's Hill (Bukit Fraser), hill resort located on the Titiwangsa Ridge in Raub District, Pahang, Malaysia.
- Malaysia Federal Route 56 (Jalan Bukit Fraser 1 or Jalan Gap-Bukit Fraser), federal road in Fraser's Hill, both in Selangor and Pahang state, Malaysia.
- Malaysia Federal Route 148 (Jalan Bukit Fraser 2), second federal road in Fraser's Hill, Pahang, Malaysia.
