= Malaysia Federal Route 218 =

Road in Malaysia

Federal Route 218
- Jalan Lama Bentong–Raub

Route information
- Length: 35.00 km (21.75 mi)
- Existed: 1915–present

Major junctions
- North end: Taman Raub Jaya near Raub
- FT 55 Federal Route 55; FT 8 Federal Route 8
- South end: Bentong

Location
- Country: Malaysia
- Primary destinations: Bentong; Kampung Sungai Penjuring; Sang Lee; Kampung Sungai Chetang; Teranum; Teras; Raub

Highway system
- Highways in Malaysia; Expressways; Federal; State

Federal Route 218, or Jalan Lama Bentong–Raub, is a federal road in Pahang, Malaysia. The roads connects Raub in the north to Bentong in the south. This stretch used to be a part of Federal Route 8. The Kilometre Zero (KM0) of the Federal Route 218 starts at Bentong.

== History ==
The route was first constructed in 1887 as part of the Kuala Kubu Bharu-The Gap-Kuala Lipis road, where a southern extension was built from Teranum to Bentong in 1915, which became the first section of what was later part of the original Federal Route 8 to be built. The Bentong-Teranum-Raub section was then bypassed by straighter super two highway running through FELDA Lurah Bilut, causing this old, winding section to be re-gazetted as the Federal Route 218.

== Features ==
At most sections, the Federal Route 218 was built under the JKR R5 road standard, allowing maximum speed limit of up to 90 km/h.

== List of junctions ==
| Km | Exit | Junctions | To | Remarks |
|---|---|---|---|---|
| | | Raub; Federal Route 8 junction (near Taman Raub Jaya) | North; FT 8 Bentong-Kuala Lipis Road; Raub town centre Benta; Kuala Lipis; Kota Bharu South; FT 8 Bentong-Kuala Lipis Road; Lurah Bilut; Bentong; Bentong East Interchange for East Coast Expressway FT 2 AH141 East Coast Expressway | T-junctions |
| | | Sungai Bilut bridge | | |
| | | SEMOA Farm | | |
| | | Sungai Bilut bridge | | |
| | | Sungai Teras bridge | | |
| | | Teras; Sekolah Jenis Kebangsaan (C) Teras | South; Teras Chinese School | T-junction |
| | | Teras; Teras Town Centre | | Shophouses both sides of road |
| | | Teras; Kampung Baharu Teras | Northwest; C3 Jalan Teras; Kampung Baharu Teras; Teras Valley durian plantations | T-junction |
| | | Teras; Taman Seroja | West; Taman Seroja | T-junction |
| | | Teras; Taman Muhibbah | West; Taman Muhibbah | T-junction |
| | | Sungai Tunggul Bangun bridge | | - |
| | | Teranum | South; FT 55 Jalan Gap-Teranum; Kuala Kubu Bharu; Fraser's Hill via FT 56; Tanjung Malim via FT 1 | T-junctions |
| | | Kampung Sungai Chetang | West; Kampung Sungai Chetang | T-junction |
| | | Sungai Kenung bridge | | |
| | | Sang Lee | | |
Raub–Bentong district border
| | | Caravan Serai | | |
| | | Kampung Sungai Penjuring | West; Kampung Sungai Penjuring | T-junction |
| | | Bentong | North; FT 8 Bentong-Kuala Lipis Road; Lurah Bilut; Raub; Kuala Lipis; Kota Bharu South; FT 8 Bentong-Kuala Lipis Road; Bentong Town Centre; Ketari; Bentong East Interchange for East Coast Expressway FT 2 AH141 Kuala Lumpur–Karak Expressway/East Coast Expressway | T-junctions |

== Gallery ==
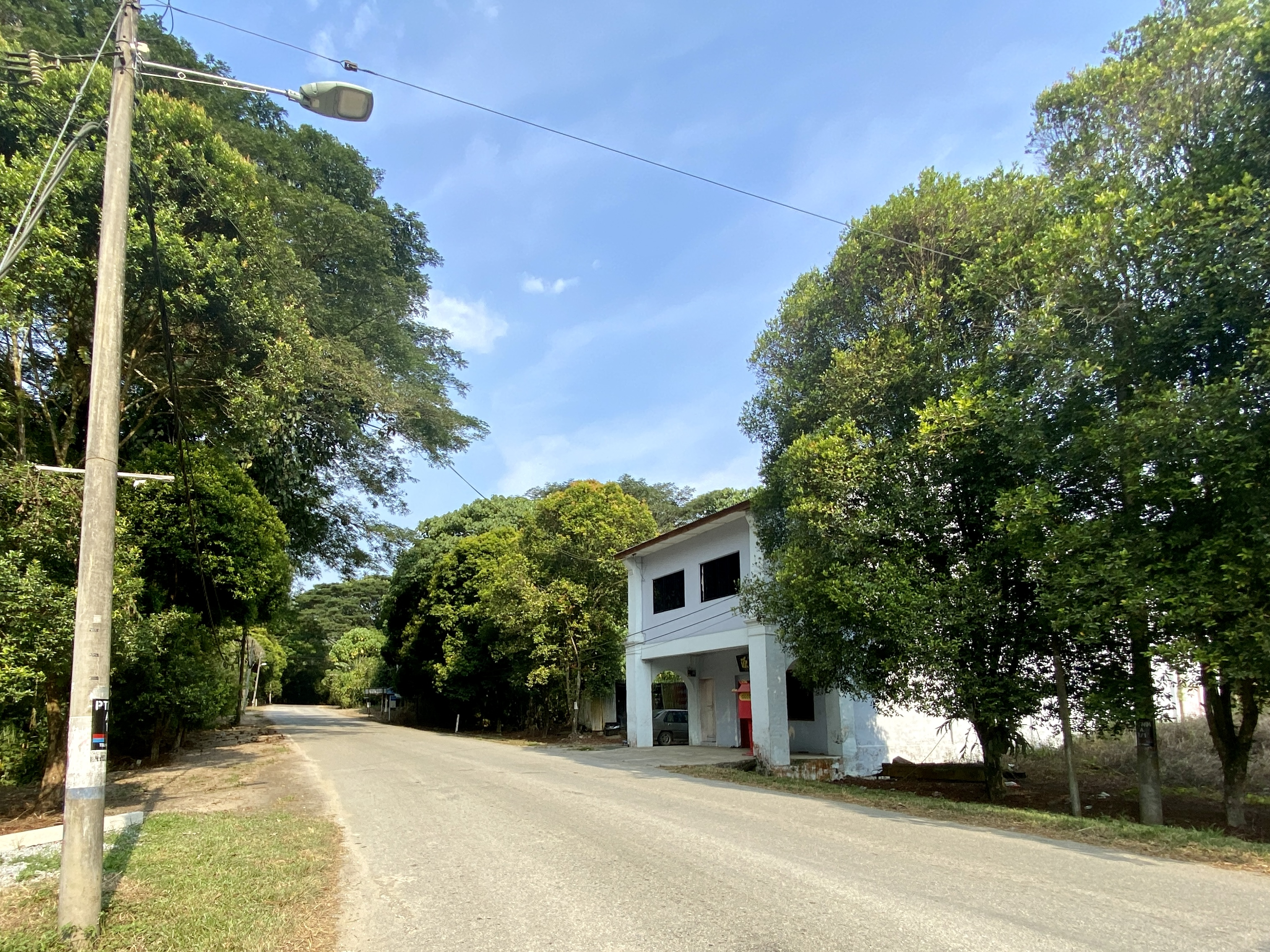
Route 218 at Teranum towards Bentong.

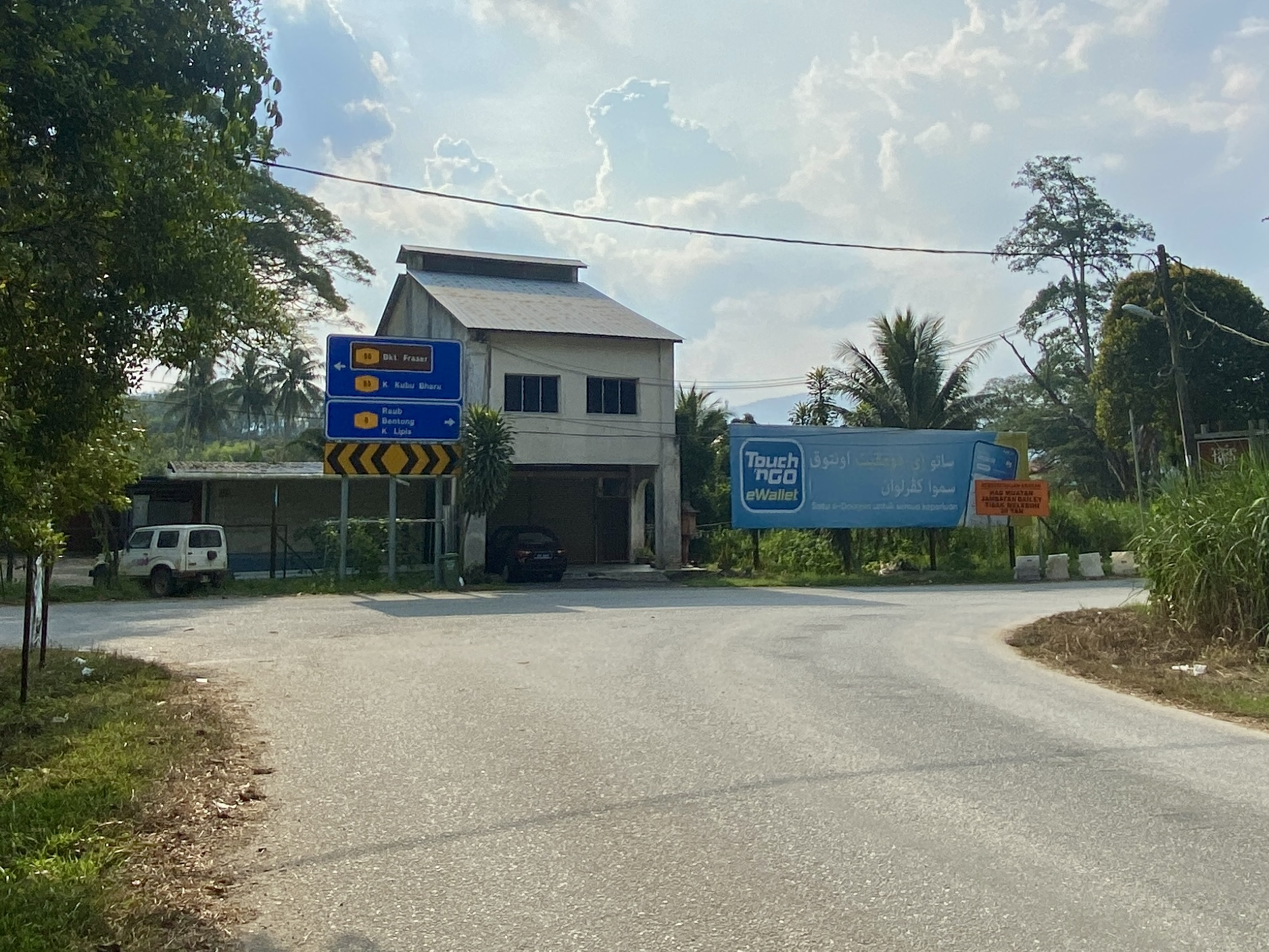
Route 218 at Teranum towards Raub at right. Route 55 towards Kuala Kubu Bharu starts on the left.

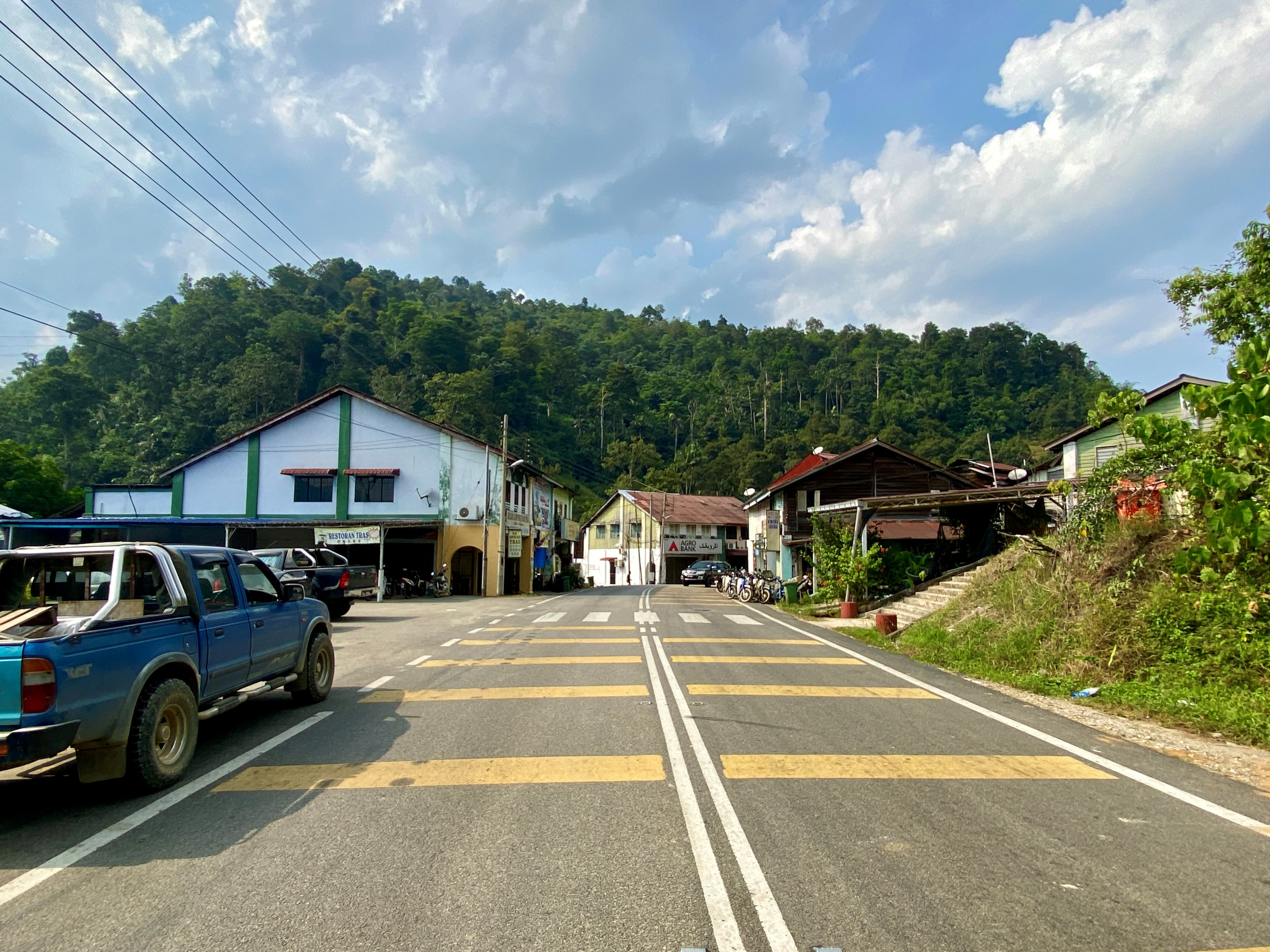
Southern approach to Teras.

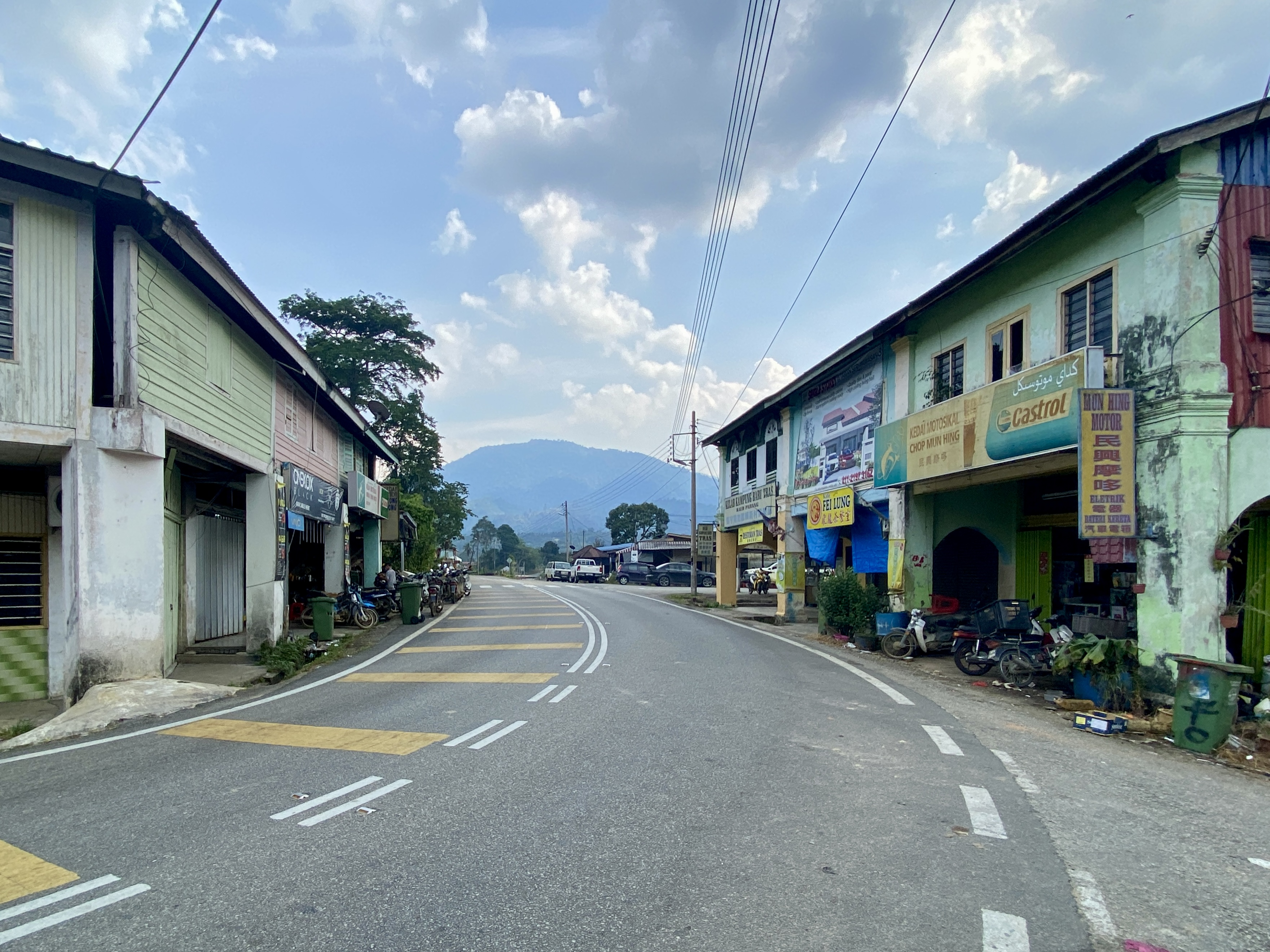
Route 218 going through Teras.

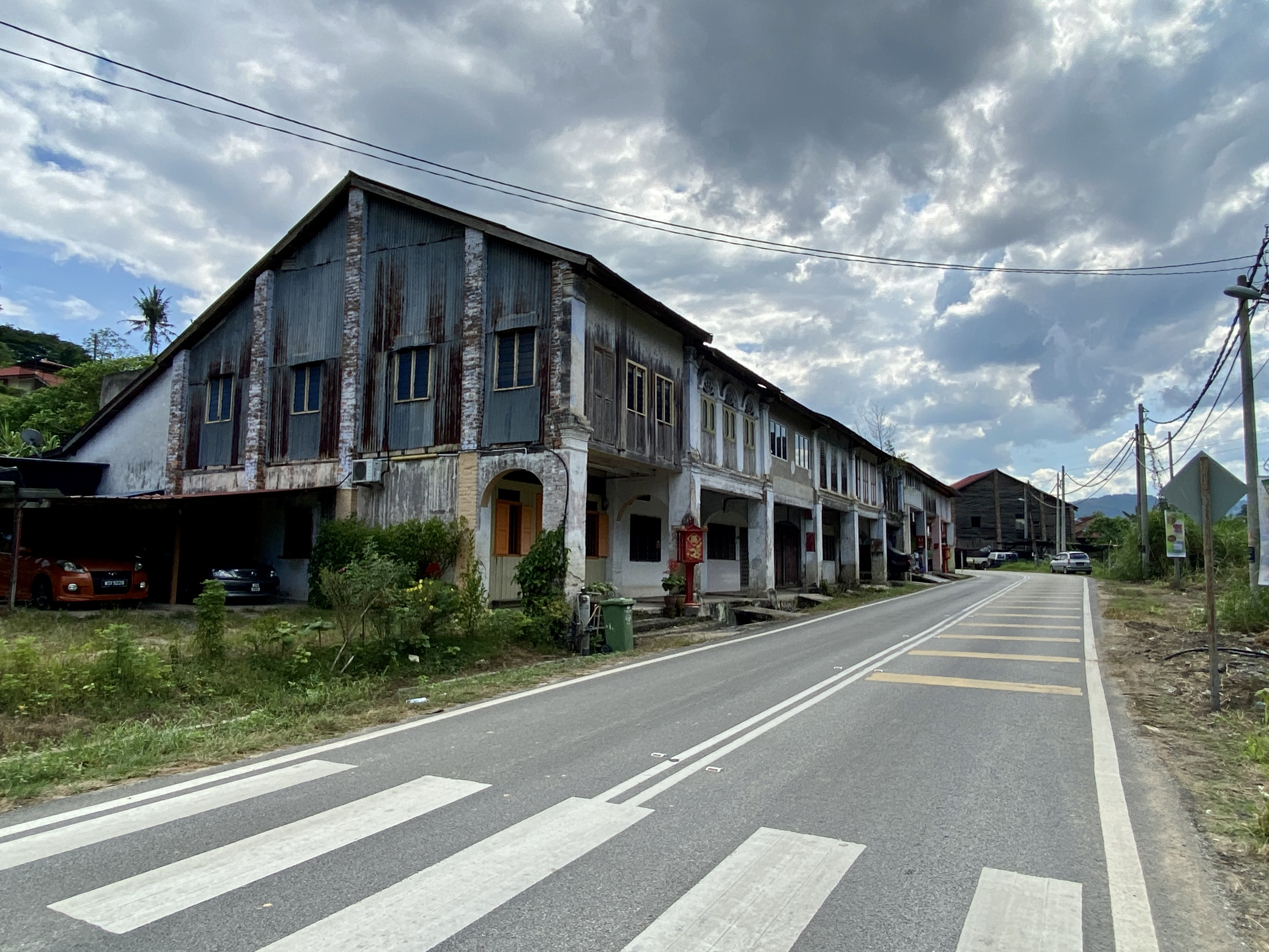
Northern entrance into Teras.
