= Frazier Park =

Frazier Park may refer to:

- Frazier Park, California, an unincorporated village in Kern County, California
- Frazier Park (Charlotte, North Carolina), an urban park in Charlotte, North Carolina
