= Roads in Fraser's Hill =

Roads in Malaysia

Federal Route 422

Route information
- Maintained by Malaysian Public Works Department
- Length: 13.5 km (8.4 mi)
- Status: Become institutional facilities federal roads
- Existed: 1920s–2018

Major junctions
- FT 56 Jalan Bukit Fraser; FT 148 Jalan Bukit Fraser 2

Location
- Country: Malaysia

Highway system
- Highways in Malaysia; Expressways; Federal; State

Roads in Fraser's Hill (formerly Federal Route 422), were a series of federal roads in Fraser's Hill, Pahang, Malaysia from 1920s to 2018 before being become institutional facilities federal roads. The roads are maintained by the Malaysian Public Works Department (JKR) and the Fraser's Hill Development Corporation (FHDC).

There are eleven federal roads in Fraser's Hill including Jalan Mager, Jalan Valley, Jalan Peninjau, Jalan Genting, Jalan Lady Guillemard, Jalan Lady Maxwell, Jalan Quarry, Jalan Red Cross, Jalan Richmond, Jalan Pine Tree and Jalan Megador.

On 30 July 2018, the Malaysian Public Works Ministry had decommissioned the entire FT422 to become institutional facilities federal roads operated by JKR Pahang and JKR Selangor.

The Federal Route 422 had allocated as Persiaran Pelabuhan Kuantan in Kuantan, Pahang.

== Roads in Fraser's Hill ==
Malay name(s)	English name(s)	Length (Kilometers)	Notes
Jalan Mager	Mager Road	0.7	
Jalan Valley	Valley Road	1.5	
Jalan Peninjau	Observation Road	5.5	
Jalan Genting	Genting Road	1.0	
Jalan Lady Guillemard	Lady Guillemard Road	0.4	Named after the wife of Sir Laurence Guillemard. The Shahzan Inn (formerly Merlin Inn) is located in this road
Jalan Lady Maxwell	Lady Maxwell Road	1.4	Named after Lady Evelyn Maxwell, the wife of Sir William George Maxwell. The Silverpark Resort is located in this road
Jalan Quarry	Quarry Road	0.4	
Jalan Red Cross	Red Cross Road	0.5	
Jalan Richmond	Richmond Road	0.7	
Jalan Pine Tree	Pine Tree Road	0.9	
Jalan Megador	Megador Road	0.5	
