= Cat Frazier =

American graphic designer and blogger

- Born: April 5, 1991; Montgomery, Alabama, U.S.
- Died: June 29, 2026 (aged 35); Oakland, California, U.S.
- Education: Pratt Institute (BA)
- Website: http://animatedtext.tumblr.com/ http://www.catfrazierdesign.com/

Catherine Louise Frazier (April 5, 1991 – June 29, 2026) was an American graphic designer and blogger. She is best known for AnimatedText, a blog where she posted original animated text GIFs made on request. Frazier lived in Oakland, California, and worked as a designer for California's Pacific Gas and Electric Company.

Her inspirations included Jeremy Bailey, Paula Scher, and Dominique Falla. She was black and openly queer.

== Career ==
Frazier graduated from the Pratt Institute in 2013 with a degree in critical and visual studies. She worked for a variety of companies as a designer, one being California's Pacific Gas and Electric Company.

She began her Tumblr blog, AnimatedText, in fall 2012. On this blog, she primarily published original animated text GIFs that she made using the programs Xara 3D Maker 7 and Photoshop CS6. Her first GIF to go viral was a spinning, serif font text that read "lol nothing matters". In March 2013, Frank Ocean reblogged her GIF of the text "ur not gucci lol", greatly increasing her follower base.

In 2016 Frazier began a new project called "Ask Cat", through which she bestowed advice to people who anonymously sent her a text. After someone messaged her, she would respond with an animated text GIF and some advice in response to the person's question. This project was in partnership with Useless Press, an online publishing collective that asked her to collaborate.

Frazier was also well-known within the Bay Area, California, punk and alternative music scene as an organizer of local concerts, art markets, and fundraisers.

== Blog ==
The content on Frazier's blog, AnimatedText, has a "retro-maximalist" aesthetic recalling the late 1990s' World Wide Web and early social sites like GeoCities. Frazier was interested in the customizability and appearance of websites she grew up with, particularly sites such as GeoCities, Myspace, and Blingee. This interest began when she came across Internet Archaeology, a website that recovers and shares graphic artifacts from earlier days of internet culture. Frazier realized that she was dissatisfied with the principles of graphic design she had learned in her career (e.g. clean, legible, generic), so she embraced the unapologetic tackiness of the old-Internet graphics that she felt created an "empowerment-through-DIY" via their personalization and non-requirement of design expertise.

== Personal life ==
Frazier was born on April 5, 1991, in Montgomery, Alabama.

Frazier had an ongoing problem concerning her identity: people often assumed that she was a straight white man; Frazier was black and openly queer. In 2015, she began to post selfies of herself to prove that she was not who people assumed she was, opposing the "presumed neutrality" of all people on the internet being "straight, white, and male".

She died on June 9, 2026, at a hospital in Oakland, California, where she had been admitted three weeks earlier for a heart-related emergency.
