= Frazier (surname) =

Frazier is a surname of Scottish origin, and may refer to:

== A ==
- Adam Frazier (born 1991), American baseball player

== B ==
- Blake Frazier (born 2005), American football player
- Brenda Frazier (1921–1982), American “celebutante” socialite during the Depression era

== C ==
- Cat Frazier, American graphic designer and blogger
- Calvin Frazier (1915–1972), American blues guitarist, singer and songwriter
- Charles Frazier (born 1950), American historical novelist
- Clint Frazier (born 1994), American baseball player

== D ==
- Dallas Frazier (1939–2022), American country musician and songwriter
- Darnella Frazier, American awardee of 2021 Pulitzer Prize Special Citations and Awards
- Demetrius Terrence Frazier (1972–2025), American executed murderer
- Dylan Frazier (born 2001), American professional pickleball player

== E ==
- E. Franklin Frazier (1894–1962), American sociologist

== F ==
- Frederick Frazier, American politician from Texas

== J ==
- James Frazier (1940–1981), American orchestral conductor
- James B. Frazier (1856–1937), U.S Senator from Tennessee, 1905–1911
- Jeff Frazier (born 1982), American baseball player
- Jim Frazier (born 1940), Australian inventor, naturalist, and cinematographer
- Joe Frazier (1944–2011), American heavyweight boxing champion
- Joshua Frazier (born 1995), American football player

== K ==
- Kavon Frazier (born 1994), American football player
- Kendrick Frazier (1942–2022), American science writer; magazine editor
- Kenneth Frazier, (born 1954), American business executive; president and CEO of pharmaceutical maker Merck & Co.
- Kevin Frazier, (born 1964), American television host and actor

== L ==
- LaGaylia Frazier (born 1961), American-born, Swedish singer
- LaToya Ruby Frazier (born 1982), American contemporary artist
- L'Merchie Frazier (born 1951), American textile artist
- Lynn Frazier (1874–1947), U.S. Senator from North Dakota, 1923–1941

== M ==
- Marvis Frazier (born 1960), American heavyweight boxer; son of Joe Frazier
- Michael Frazier II (born 1994), American basketball player
- Michele Baldwin (1966–2012) born Michele Frazier also known as Lady Ganga, stand up paddled 700 miles down the Ganges River to raise awareness of cervical cancer

== N ==
- Nate Frazier (born 2005), American football player
- Nia Sioux (born 2001), American dancer and actress born Nia Frazier

== O ==
- Owsley Brown Frazier (1935–2012), American businessman and philanthropist

== R ==
- Ryan Frazier, American basketball coach

== S ==
- Sam Frazier, Jr. (born 1944), American lyricist and blues singer
- Sheila Frazier (born 1948), American television and film actress

== T ==
- Todd Frazier (born 1986), American baseball player
- Tommie Frazier (born 1974), American football player and coach
- Tim Frazier (born 1990), American basketball player

== W ==
- Walt Frazier (born 1945), American basketball player and sportscaster
- Willie Frazier (1942–2013), American football player

== Z ==
- Zah Frazier (born 2000), American football player
