= Malaysia Federal Route 55 =

Road in Malaysia

Federal Route 55
- Jalan Kuala Kubu Bharu–Teranum–Raub; Jalan Pahang (Kuala Kubu Bharu)

Route information
- Maintained by Malaysian Public Works Department
- Length: 54.0 km (33.6 mi)
- Existed: 1887–present

Major junctions
- West end: Kuala Kubu Bharu, Selangor
- FT 1 Federal Route 1 FT 56 Jalan Bukit Fraser; FT 148 Jalan Bukit Fraser 2 FT 218 Federal Route 218
- East end: Teranum, Raub, Pahang

Location
- Country: Malaysia
- Primary destinations: Kuala Kubu Bharu, Peretak, Fraser's Hill, Teranum, Teras, Raub

Highway system
- Highways in Malaysia; Expressways; Federal; State

Federal Route 55 or Jalan Kuala Kubu Bharu–Teranum–Raub (also called Jalan Pahang in Kuala Kubu Bharu) is a 62-km federal road connecting the states of Selangor and Pahang in Malaysia. It is the first federal road ever constructed in Pahang. The road connects Kuala Kubu Bharu, Selangor to Teranum near Raub in Pahang where it meets Federal Route 218. It is the main access route to Fraser's Hill.

== Route background ==
The Kilometre Zero of the Federal Route 55 is located at Kuala Kubu Bharu, Selangor, at its intersection with the Federal Route 1, the main trunk road of the central of Peninsular Malaysia. After passing Kuala Kubu Bharu town centre, it runs along the eastern circumference of the Selangor Dam. Shortly after passing the Selangor Dam, the road becomes winding as it ascends the Titiwangsa Range until its intersection with the uphill road to Fraser's Hill at The Gap on the Selangor–Pahang state border.

Then, the road descends downhill, running in parallel with the Teranum River until Teranum where it intersects with Malaysia Federal Route 218.

As the road winds through mountainous terrain, it is often prone to landslides which result in partial or total closures of the section between Kuala Kubu Bharu and Teranum.

== History ==
=== First East-West Road ===
Built in the 1887, Federal Route 55 is the earliest federal road to be constructed in Pahang and the first road over the Titiwangsa Range or Main Range through the pass at The Gap, linking the West Coast of Peninsular Malaysia with the East Coast. It was constructed as an 80-mile bridle track from Kuala Kubu Bharu to Kuala Lipis known as the Kuala Kubu–Kuala Lipis Road. In 1915, a road was constructed from Teranum to Bentong, forming the southern pioneer route for the Federal Route 8.

In 1919, work started on the access road to the hill station from The Gap and by 1922, the hill station named Fraser's Hill was opened to visitors. The road is now designated as Federal Route 56.

The entire roadway was upgraded and paved in 1928 with the specific cost of RM2,004 per mile (or RM1,237 per kilometre), which was considered as the most expensive road project at that time.

During the Malayan Emergency, Sir Henry Gurney, a British High Commissioner in Malaya, was assassinated by the Malayan Communist Party terrorists at Mile 56 ½, Kuala Kubu Road on 7 October 1951, on his way to Fraser's Hill. The communist terrorists ambushed his Rolls-Royce Silver Wraith and shot him to death. His remains were buried at the Cheras Road Christian Cemetery (now Cheras War Cemetery) at Jalan Cheras, Kuala Lumpur. A memorial signboard was later erected by Malaysian Public Works Department at the site of the incident (location: 3.673596,101.747346 ).

The portion of the Kuala Kubu–Kuala Lipis Road from Teranum to Raub, together with the road from Teranum to Bentong, became part of Federal Route 8 before they were bypassed by a new, straighter super two road through FELDA Lurah Bilut. There after, the bypassed old road between Bentong and Raub including the section between Teranum and Raub was re-gazetted to become the new Federal Route 218.

At the end of the 1990s, a new water dam known as the Sungai Selangor Dam was constructed to cater to the increasing water demand in the Klang Valley. During construction, a 7.7-km super two road was built to replace the existing roadway at the Sungai Selangor Dam construction site. Construction started in 2001 and was completed in 2003. This road has two bridges, the Sungai Selangor bridge and the Sungai Peretak bridge.

== Junction lists ==
Legend:

- I/C - Interchange, I/S - Intersection, RSA - Rest and service area, OBR - Overhead bridge restaurant, R/R - Restaurant and rest plaza, L/B - Layby, V/P - Vista point, TN - tunnel, T/P - Toll plaza, BR - Bridge
- C - Cloverleaf, S - Stack, T-A - Trumpet-A, T-B - Trumpet-B, DT - Directional-T/Y, SDT - Semi-Directional-T/Y, P-Y - Partial-Y, D - Diamond, P-C - Partial cloverleaf, D-D - Diverging diamond, D-R - Direct ramp

State	District	Location	km	mi	Name	Destinations	Notes
Selangor	Hulu Selangor	Kuala Kubu Bharu	0.0	0.0	Kuala Kubu Bharu; Kuala Kubu Bharu-Federal Route 1 I/S	FT 1 Federal Route 1 – Tanjung Malim, Slim River, Ipoh, Universiti Pendidikan Sultan Idris (UPSI), Sabak Bernam, Rasa, Batang Kali, Rawang, Kuala Lumpur; North–South Expressway Northern Route / AH2 – Bukit Kayu Hitam, Ipoh, Kuala Lumpur, Klang; Jalan Stesen Keretapi – Kuala Kubu Bharu railway station	Signalised crossroads
Selangor	Hulu Selangor	Kuala Kubu Bharu			Kuala Kubu Bharu Rest and Service Area		
Selangor	Hulu Selangor	Kuala Kubu Bharu			JPJ district branch office	Malaysian Road Transport Department (JPJ) district branch office	
Selangor	Hulu Selangor	Kuala Kubu Bharu			Kuala Kubu Bharu; Taman Teratai Taman Arif	Jalan Teratai 1 – Taman Teratai, Taman Arif	T-junctions
Selangor	Hulu Selangor	Kuala Kubu Bharu			Kuala Kubu Bharu; Kampung Kelapa	Kampung Kelapa	T-junctions
Selangor	Hulu Selangor	Kuala Kubu Bharu			Kuala Kubu Bharu; Jalan Tun Salleh Ismail	Jalan Tun Salleh Ismail	T-junctions
Selangor	Hulu Selangor	Kuala Kubu Bharu			Sungai Kubu bridge		
Selangor	Hulu Selangor	Kuala Kubu Bharu			Kuala Kubu Bharu; Jalan Syed Masyor	Jalan Syed Masyor – Kuala Kubu Bharu Hospital , Syed Masahor Library (Hulu Selangor District Library)	T-junctions
Selangor	Hulu Selangor	Kuala Kubu Bharu			Al-Rahimiah Jamek Mosque		
Selangor	Hulu Selangor	Kuala Kubu Bharu			Kuala Kubu Bharu Mini Stadium		
Selangor	Hulu Selangor	Kuala Kubu Bharu			MPHS headquarters	Hulu Selangor Municipal Council (MPHS) headquarters – Monument of Kuala Kubu Tragedy	
Selangor	Hulu Selangor	Kuala Kubu Bharu			Kuala Kubu Bharu; Jalan Merdeka	Jalan Merdeka – Town Centre, Kuala Kubu Bharu Post Office	T-junctions
Selangor	Hulu Selangor	Kuala Kubu Bharu			Kuala Kubu Bharu; Jalan Ampang Pechah	Jalan Bukit Kerajaan – Government offices, Hulu Selangor District and Land Offices, Kuala Kubu Bharu Magistrate Court; B54 Jalan Ampang Pechah – Ampang Pechah (Site of the original Kuala Kubu), Rasa, Kuala Lumpur, Darul Quran Jakim	Signalised crossroads
Selangor	Hulu Selangor	Kuala Kubu Bharu			Hindu Temple		
Selangor	Hulu Selangor	Kuala Kubu Bharu			Kuala Kubu Bharu; Jalan Kubu	Jalan Kubu – Town Centre, Hulu Selangor District Police Headquarters	T-junctions
Selangor	Hulu Selangor	Kuala Kubu Bharu			JKR Hulu Selangor District Headquarters	Malaysian Public Works Department (JKR) Hulu Selangor District Headquarters	
Selangor	Hulu Selangor	Kuala Kubu Bharu			Sungai Kubu bridge		
Selangor	Hulu Selangor	Kuala Kubu Bharu			Kampung Asam Kumbang; Jalan Tengah	Jalan Tengah – Kampung Asam Kumbang (Kuala Kubu Bharu New Village)	T-junctions
Selangor	Hulu Selangor	Kuala Kubu Bharu			Taman Bukit Bunga	Taman Bukit Bunga	T-junctions
Selangor	Hulu Selangor	Kuala Kubu Bharu			Kuala Kubu Bharu Ranger Office		
Selangor	Hulu Selangor	Kuala Kubu Bharu			Sungai Kelempung bridge		
Selangor	Hulu Selangor	Kuala Kubu Bharu			Taman Selesa	Jalan Selesa 1 – Taman Selesa	T-junctions
Selangor	Hulu Selangor	Kuala Kubu Bharu			Start/end of narrow roads		
Selangor	Hulu Selangor	Kuala Kubu Bharu			Kampung Gerachi	Jalan Baru Kampung Gerachi – Kampung Gerachi	T-junctions
Selangor	Hulu Selangor	Kuala Kubu Bharu			Selangor River bridge		
Selangor	Hulu Selangor	Peretak			Start/end of dual carriageway		
Selangor	Hulu Selangor	Peretak			Sungai Selangor Dam	Sungai Selangor Dam – Splash visitor centre V	T-junctions
Selangor	Hulu Selangor	Peretak			Start/end of dual carriageway		
Selangor	Hulu Selangor	Peretak			Sungai Peretak bridge		
Selangor	Hulu Selangor	Peretak			Kampung Peretak	Jalan Baru Kampung Peretak – Kampung Peretak	T-junctions
Selangor	Hulu Selangor	Peretak			Start/end of narrow roads		
Selangor	Hulu Selangor	Sungai Chiling			Sungai Chiling bridge (Old bridge, Historical site)		
Selangor	Hulu Selangor	Sungai Chiling			Chiling Waterfalls	Sungai Chiling waterfalls – Sungai Chiling Fish Sanctuary V	
Selangor	Hulu Selangor	Sungai Chiling			Sungai Gumut waterfalls	Sungai Gumut waterfalls – Sungai Chiling Fish Sanctuary V	
Selangor	Hulu Selangor	Sungai Chiling			Sungai Gumut bridge		
Selangor	Hulu Selangor	The Gap			Sir Henry Gurney's murder site Historical site during Malayan Emergency (1948-1960) not marked		
Selangor	Hulu Selangor	The Gap			The Gap Public Toilet (Dismantled)		
Selangor	Hulu Selangor	The Gap			The Gap Pedestrian Suspension Bridge (Abandoned)		
Selangor	Hulu Selangor	The Gap			The Gap Rest House (Abandoned)		
Selangor	Hulu Selangor	The Gap			The Gap Pedestrian Suspension Bridge (Abandoned)		
Selangor	Hulu Selangor	The Gap			The Gap "Welcome to Selangor" Arch		
Selangor	Hulu Selangor	The Gap			The Gap; Fraser's Hill I/S	FT 56 Malaysia Federal Route 56 – Fraser's Hill	Fraser's Hill-bound only T-junctions
Pahang	Raub	The Gap			The Gap Layby		
Pahang	Raub	The Gap			The Gap; Fraser's Hill Downhill Road I/S	FT 148 Malaysia Federal Route 148	Exit only No entry T-junctions
Pahang	Raub	Teranum			Sungai Teranum bridge		
Pahang	Raub	Teranum			Kampung Sungai Terong Manis		
Pahang	Raub	Teranum			Teranum Police Station	Access Road	T-junctions
Pahang	Raub	Teranum	54.0	33.6	Teranum; Old Bentong-Raub Road I/S	FT 218 Old Bentong-Raub Road – Teras, Raub, Kuala Lipis, Kota Bharu, Bentong, Kampung Sungai Chetang, Sang Lee, Kampung Sungai Penjuring Kuala Lumpur–Karak Expressway / FT 2 / AH141 – Kuala Lumpur, Kuantan, Kuala Terengganu	T-junctions
1.000 mi = 1.609 km; 1.000 km = 0.621 mi: Closed/former; Incomplete access

* Note: The Pahang-Selangor border runs along the Titiwangsa drainage divide to the east of the archway then proceeds along the middle of the road before proceeding up the hill slope from the point between sentry hut and the road to Teranum at The Gap-Fraser's Hill Road junction.

== Gallery ==
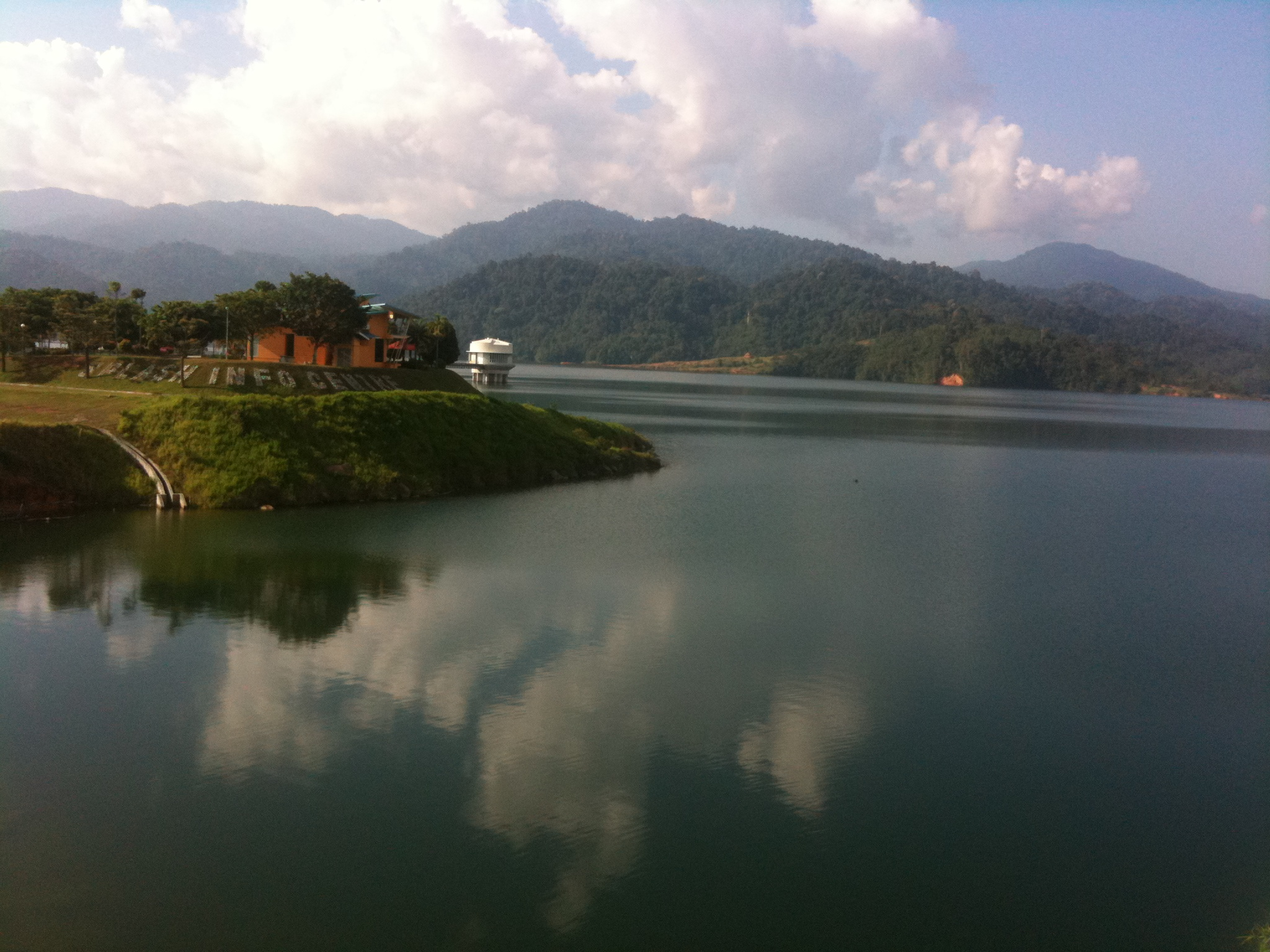
Selangor River Dam on Route 55.

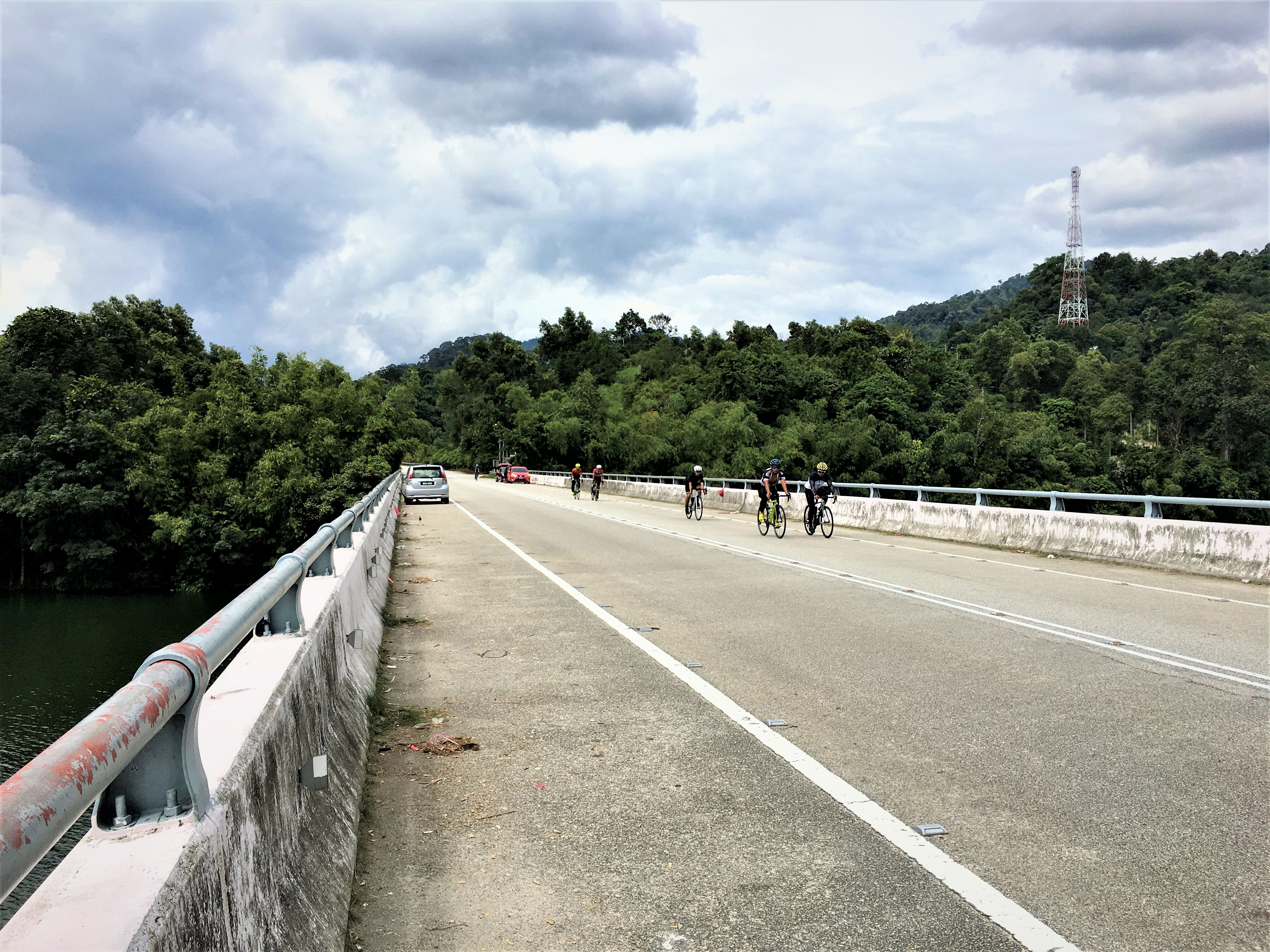
Cyclist on the Selangor Dam bridge near Peretak.

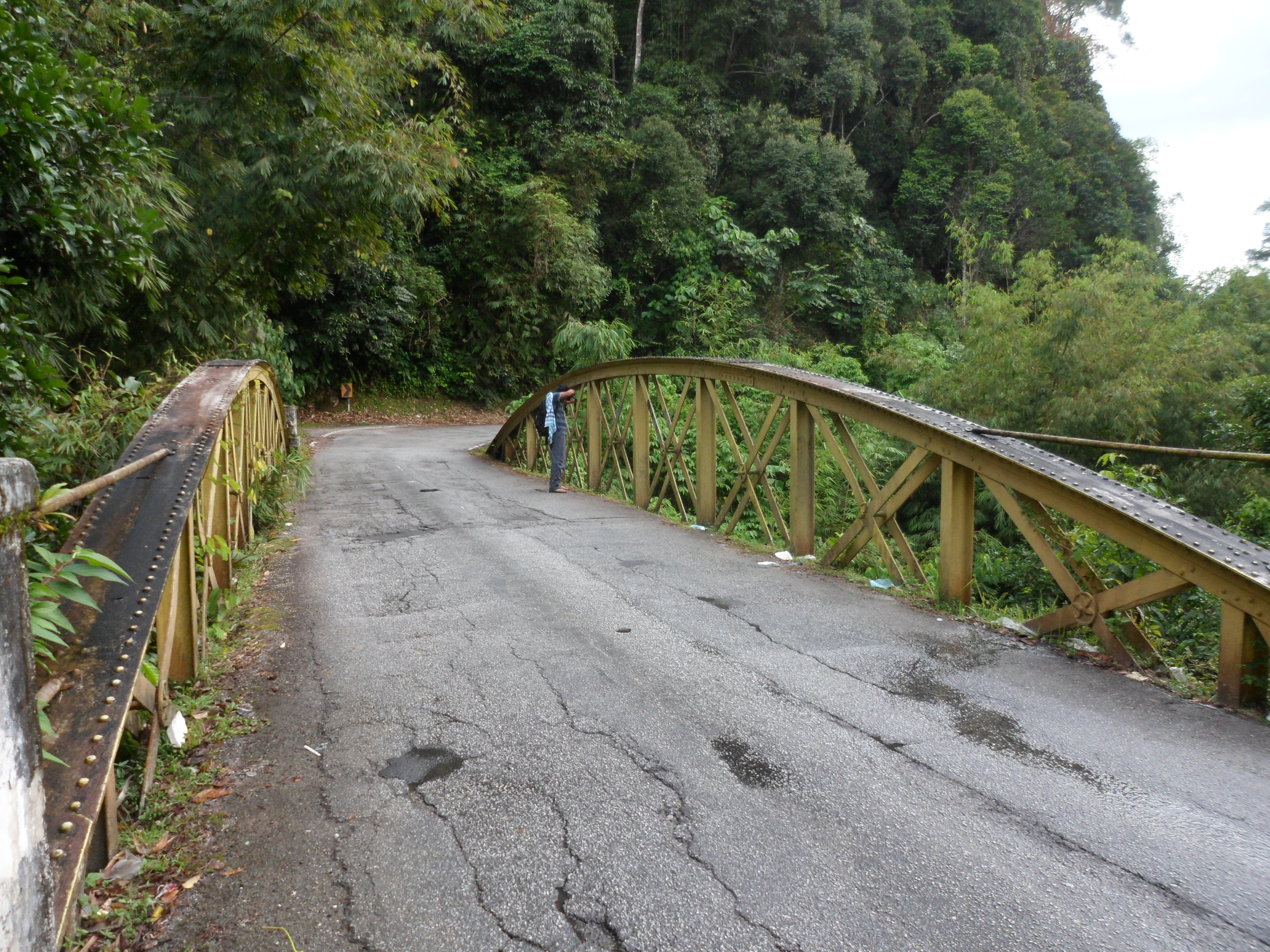
Old Sungai Chiling bridge near Peretak, now replaced with a newer bridge next to it.

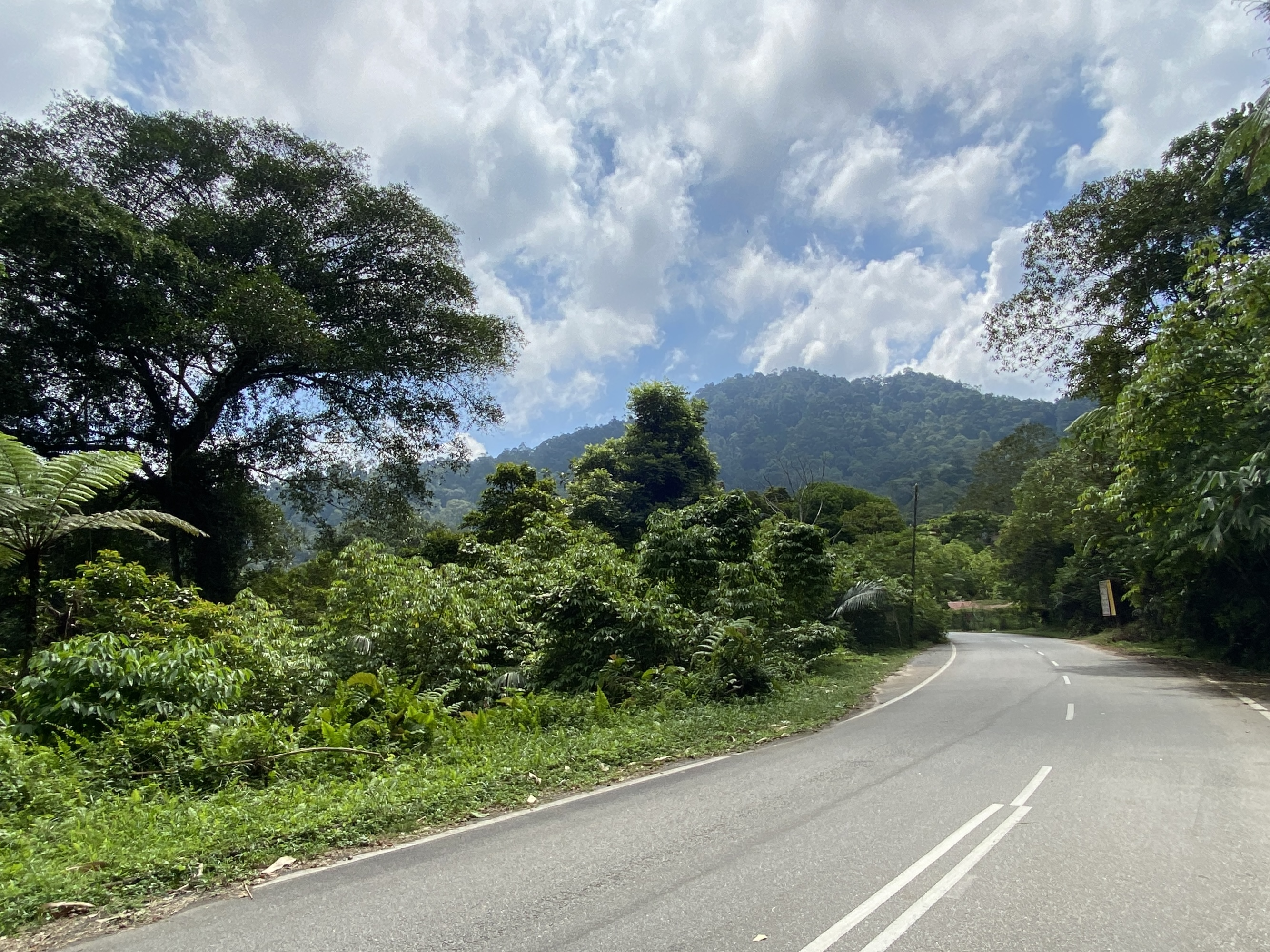
Approaching The Gap on Route 55.

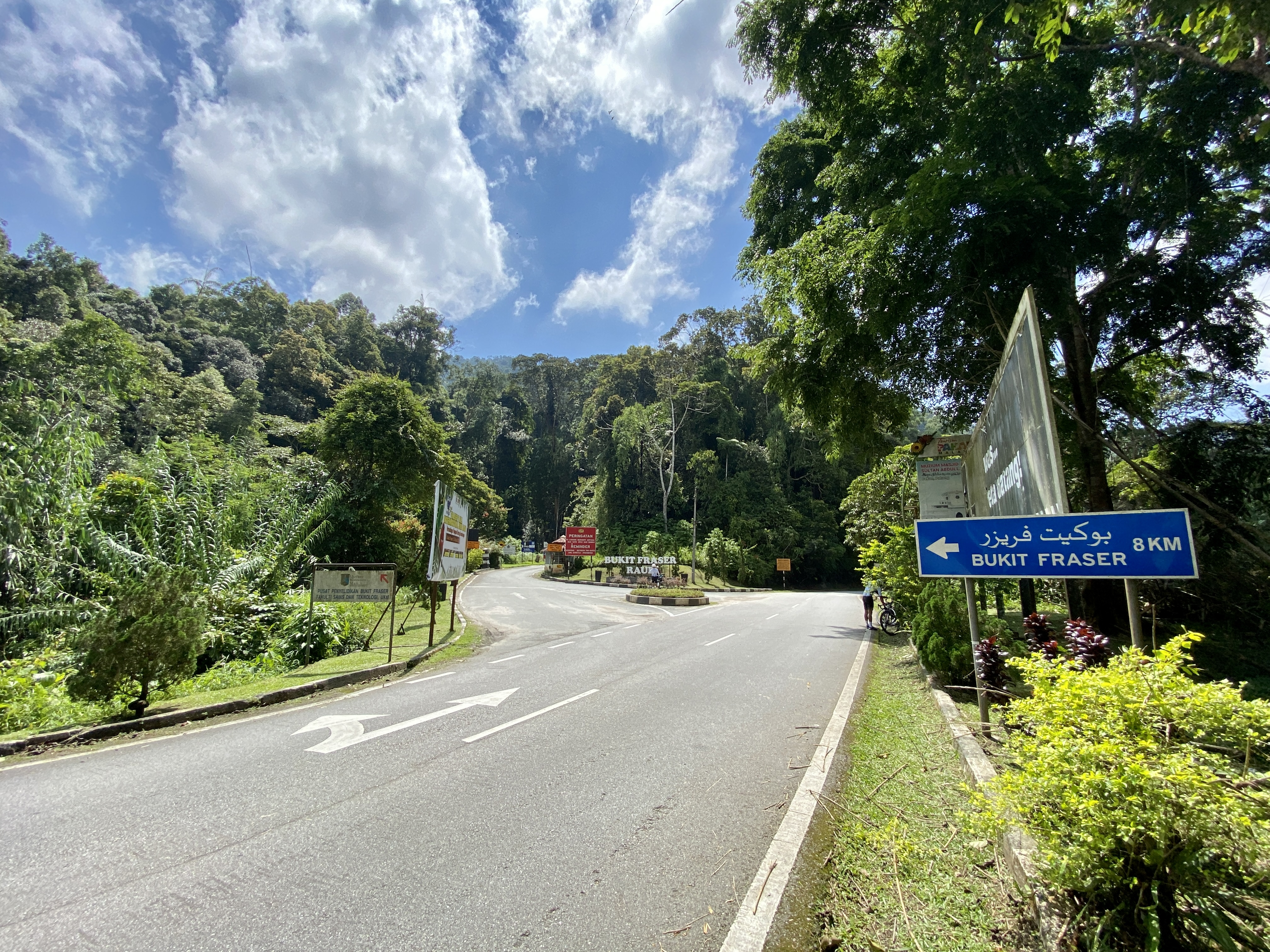
Route 55 at The Gap, with the road to Fraser's Hill to the left.

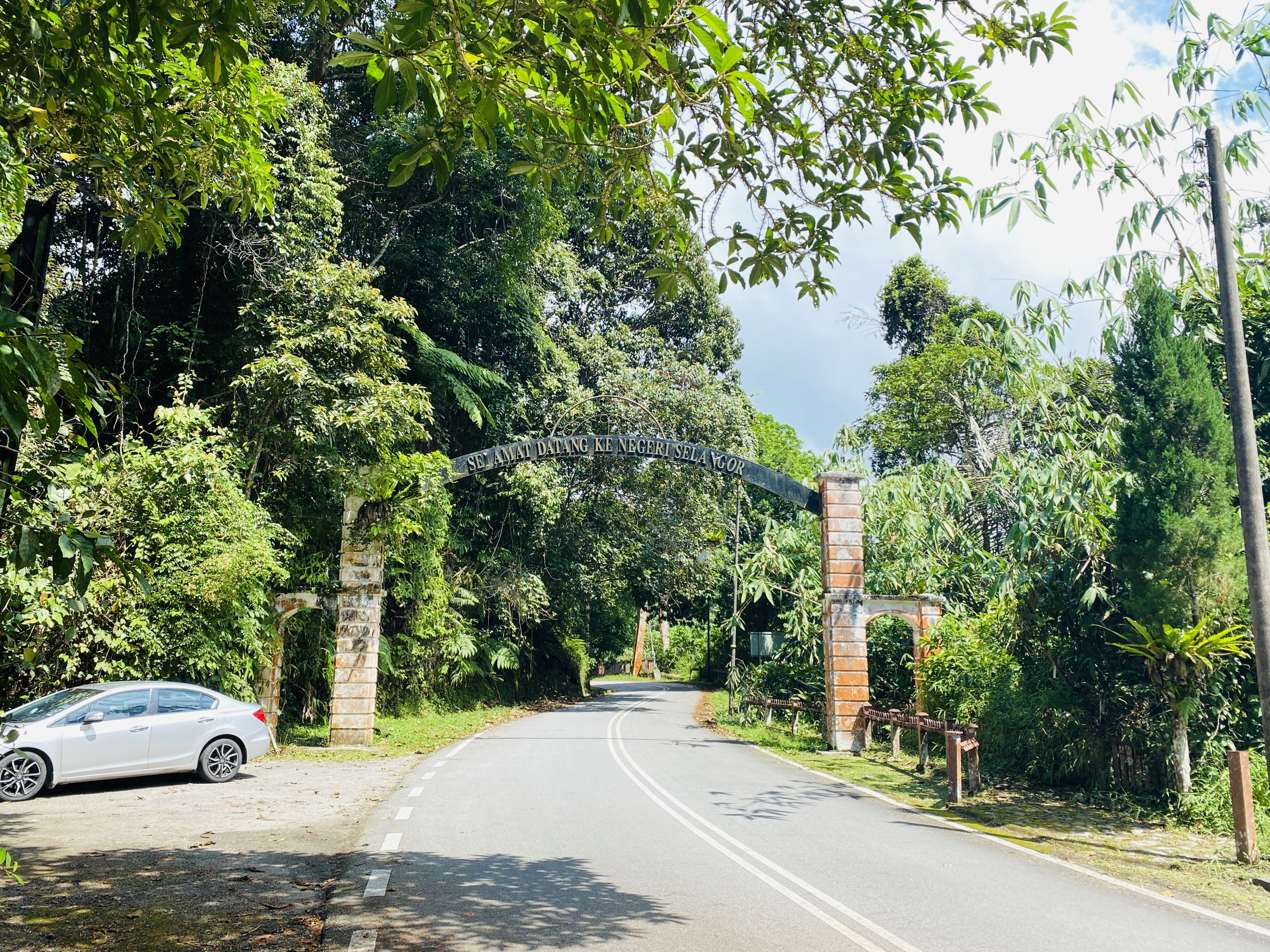
Entering Selangor at The Gap.

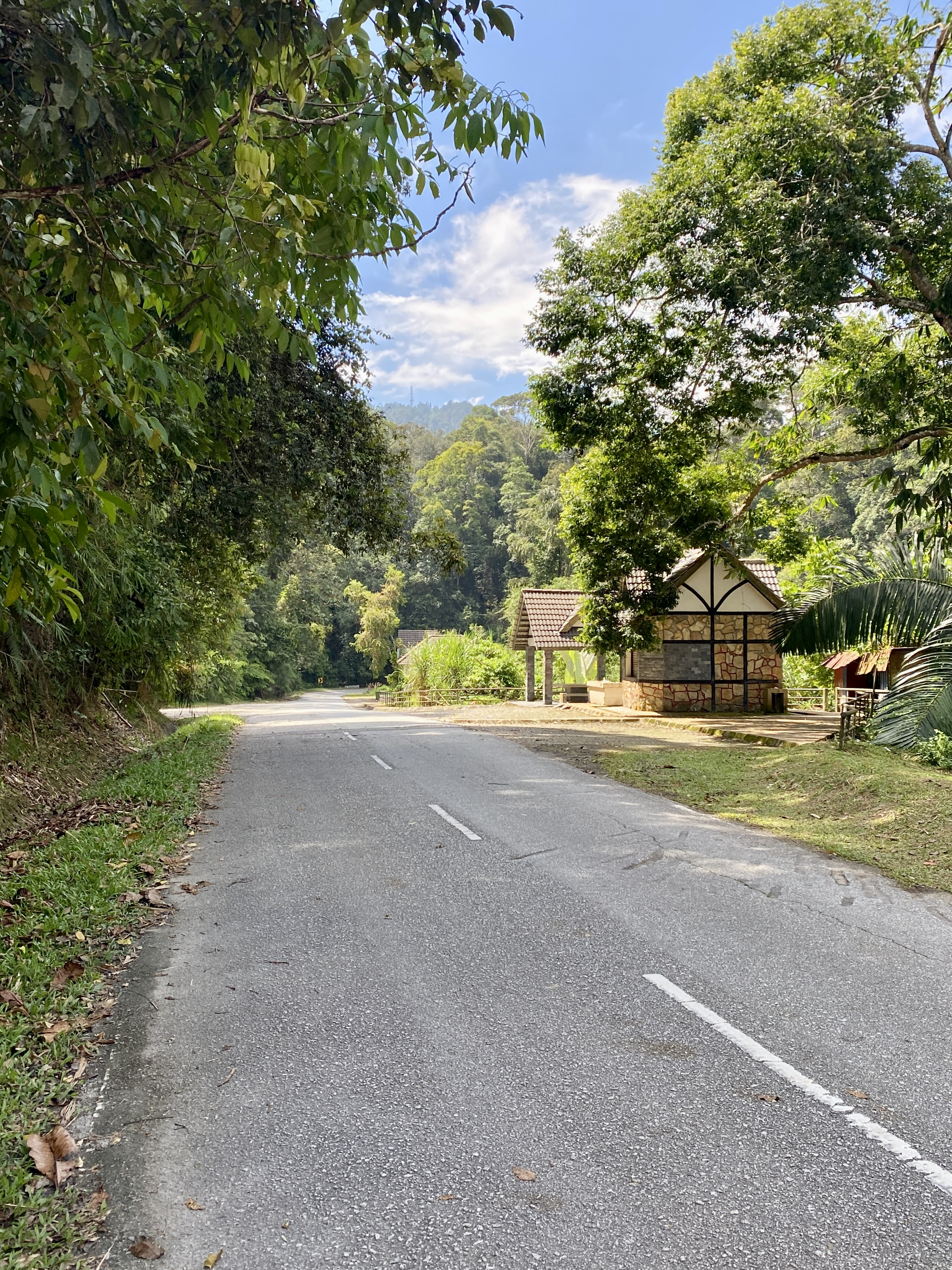
Downhill from The Gap towards Teranum.

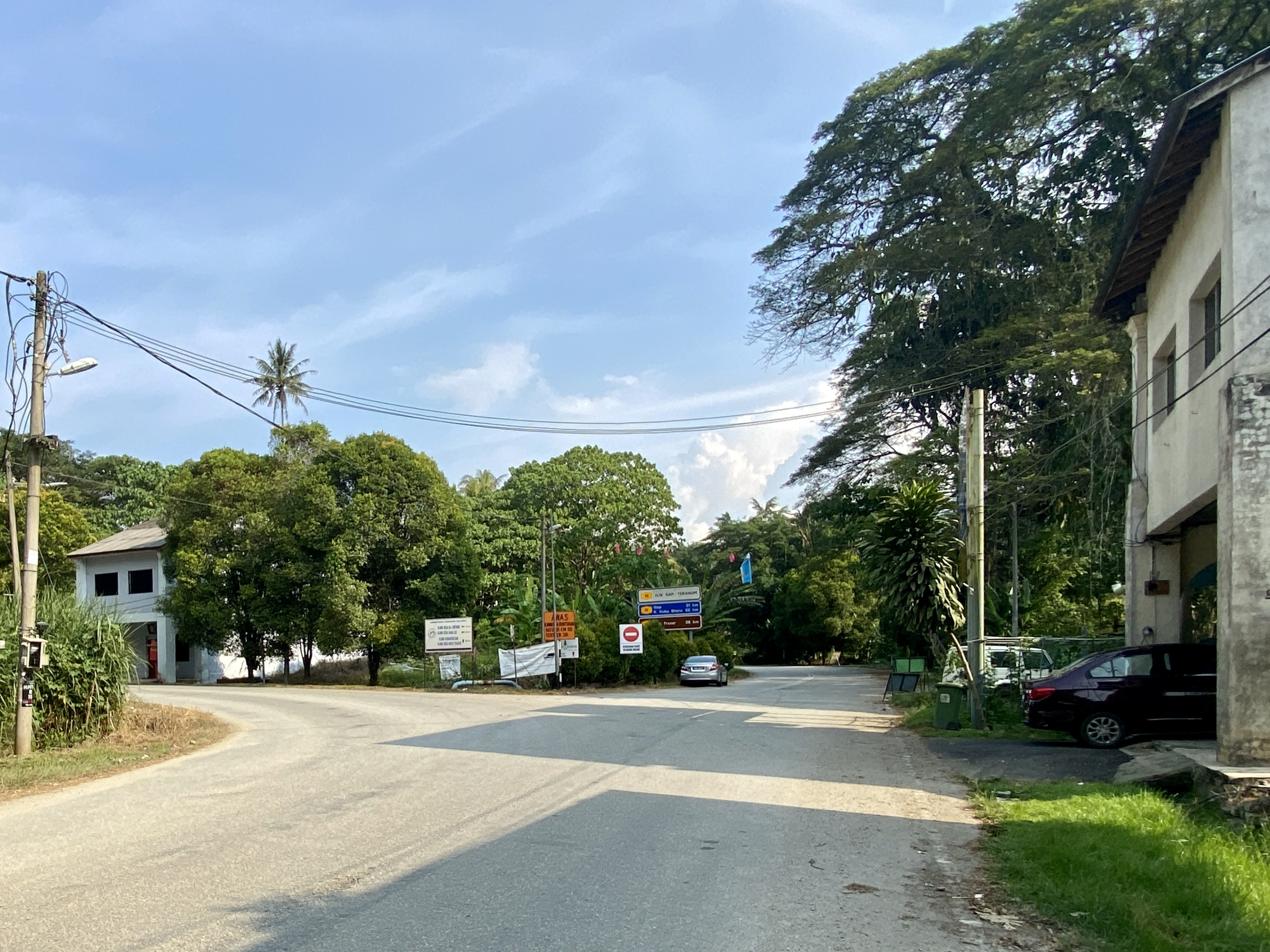
Eastern starting point of Route 55 at intersection with Route 218 at Teranum.

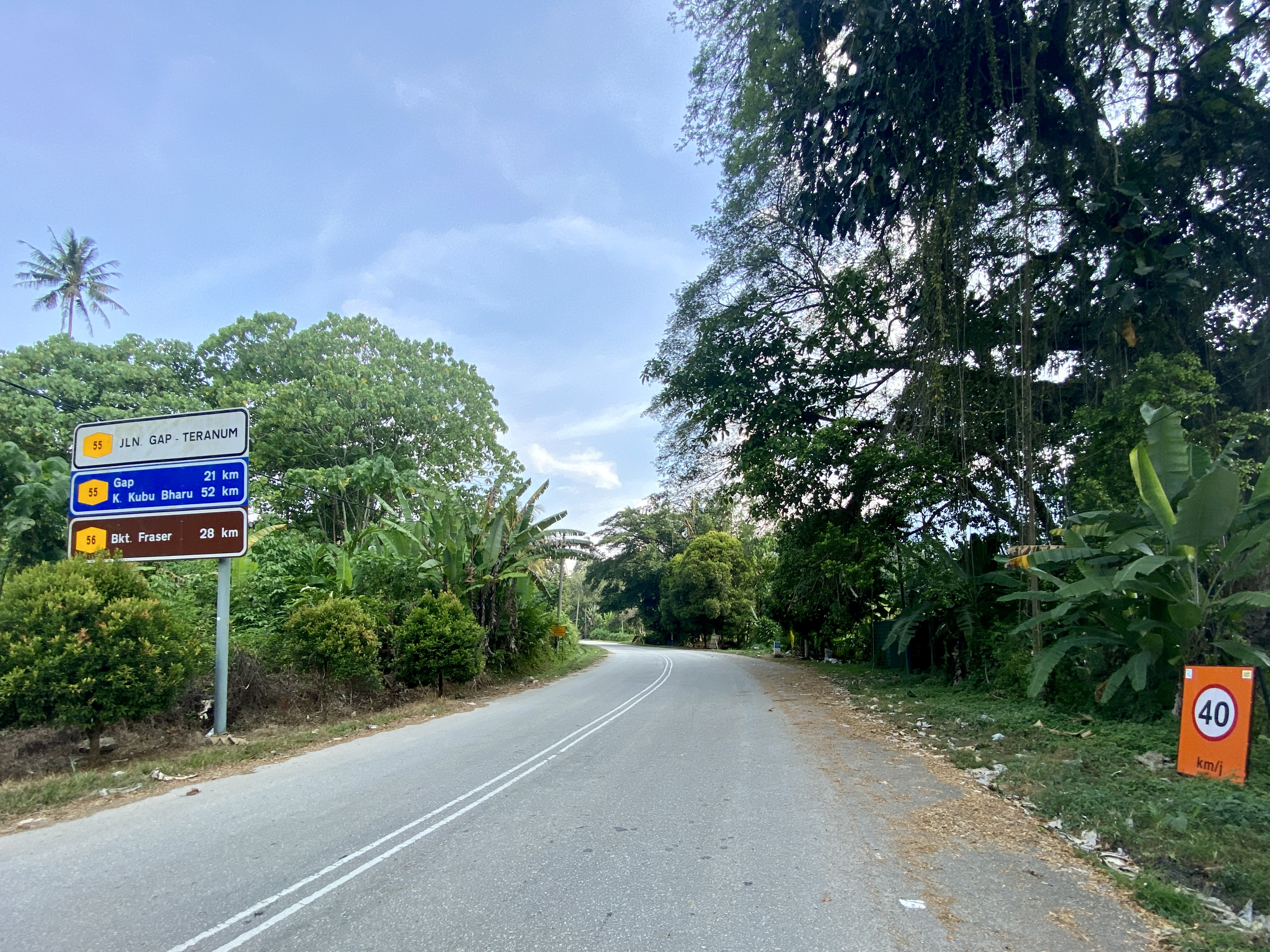
Eastern starting point of Roue 55 at Teranum.

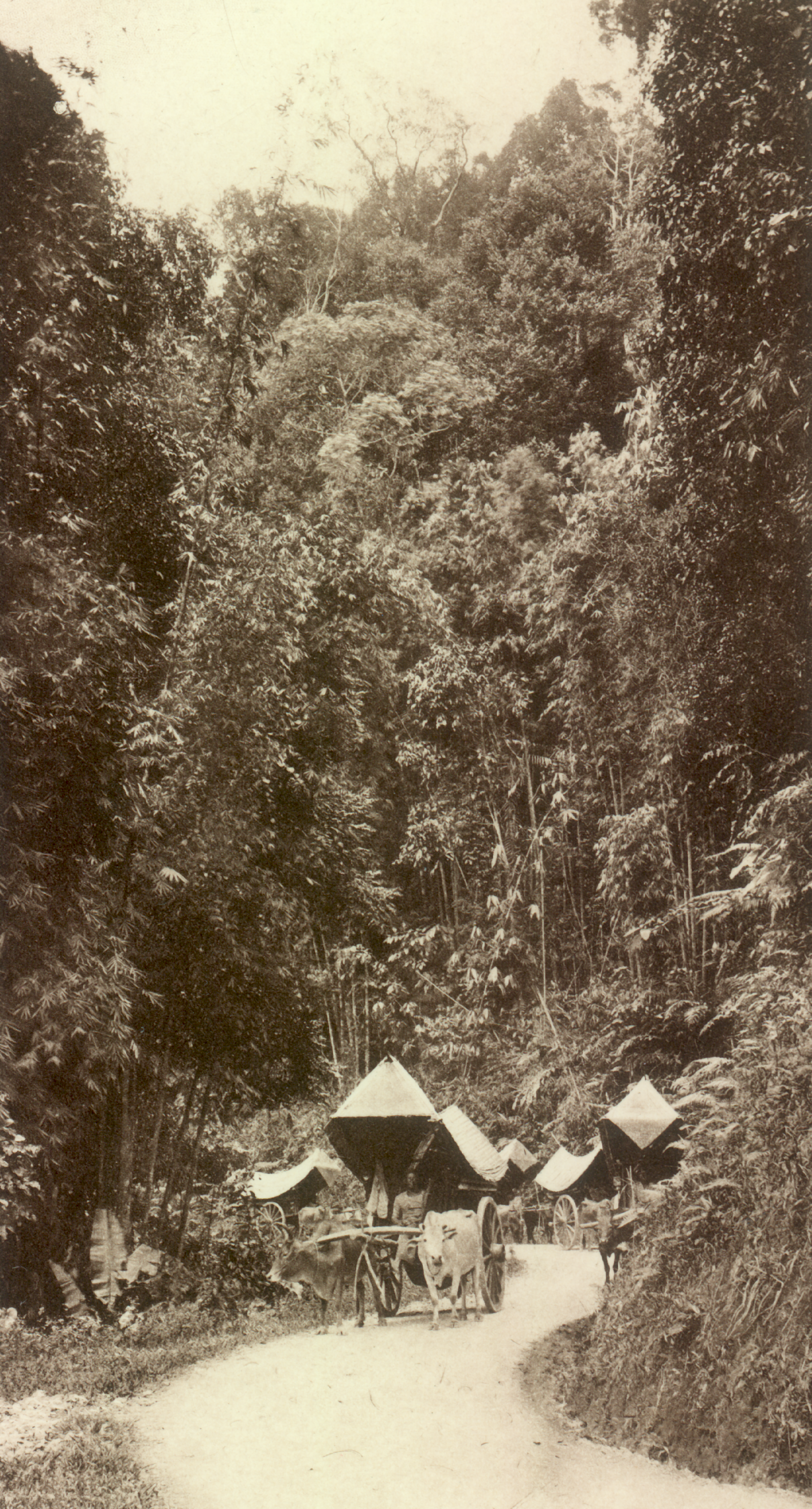
Route 55 circa 1910.
