= Selangor State Route B54 =

Road in Malaysia

Selangor Route 54
- Jalan Ampang Pechah

Major junctions
- North end: Kuala Kubu Bharu
- FT 55 Federal Route 55; FT 1 Federal Route 1
- South end: Rasa

Location
- Country: Malaysia
- Primary destinations: Ampang Pechah

Highway system
- Highways in Malaysia; Expressways; Federal; State

Selangor State Route B54, Jalan Ampang Pechah or Jalan Rasa is a major road in Selangor, Malaysia.

== History ==
On 7-9 May 2026, the Jalan Ampang Pechah closed from 10 pm to 6 am for the road upgrading, from KM 0.0 to KM 0.45, and KM 1.50 to KM 2.50, totally 1.45 km (0.90 mi).

== Junction lists ==
The entire route is located in Hulu Selangor District, Selangor.

Legend:

- I/C - Interchange, I/S - Intersection, RSA - Rest and service area, OBR - Overhead bridge restaurant, R/R - Restaurant and rest plaza, L/B - Layby, V/P - Vista point, TN - tunnel, T/P - Toll plaza, BR - Bridge
- C - Cloverleaf, S - Stack, T-A - Trumpet-A, T-B - Trumpet-B, DT - Directional-T/Y, SDT - Semi-Directional-T/Y, P-Y - Partial-Y, D - Diamond, P-C - Partial cloverleaf, D-D - Diverging diamond, D-R - Direct ramp

Location	km	mi	Name	Destinations	Notes
Kuala Kubu Bharu			Kuala Kubu Bharu	Jalan Bukit Kerajaan – Government Offices, Hulu Selangor District and Land Offices, Kuala Kubu Bharu Magistrate Court; FT 55 Malaysia Federal Route 55 – Town Centre, Tanjung Malim, Kalumpang, Ipoh, Kuala Lumpur, Kuala Kubu Bharu Hospital, Hulu Selangor District Police Headquarters, Fraser's Hill, Raub, Bentong, Kuala Lipis; North–South Expressway Northern Route / AH2 – Bukit Kayu Hitam, Ipoh, Kuala Lumpur, Klang	Junctions
Kuala Kubu Bharu			Kampung Sungai Damar		
Kuala Kubu Bharu			Ampang Pechah (Site of the Original Kuala Kubu)	Jalan Taman Ampang Pechah – Taman Ampang Pechah, Al-Hidayah Mosque (Ampang Pechah Old Mosque), Darul Quran Jakim, MRSM Kuala Kubu Bharu, IKBN Peretak, Kem Bina Semangat	Junctions
Kuala Kubu Bharu			Sungai Selangor bridge		
Kuala Kubu Bharu			Taman Damai-Taman Songket	Jalan Damai – Taman Damai; Jalan Songket – Taman Songket	Junctions
Kuala Kubu Bharu			Ampang Pechah Recreational Park		
Rasa			Taman Bintang		
Rasa			Sungai Rening bridge		
Rasa			Rasa	FT 1 Malaysia Federal Route 1 – Ipoh, Tanjung Malim, Kuala Kubu Bharu, Batang Kali, Serendah, Rawang, Kuala Lumpur; North–South Expressway Northern Route / AH2 – Bukit Kayu Hitam, Ipoh, Kuala Lumpur, Klang	T-junctions
1.000 mi = 1.609 km; 1.000 km = 0.621 mi
