= L'Merchie Frazier =

American textile artist

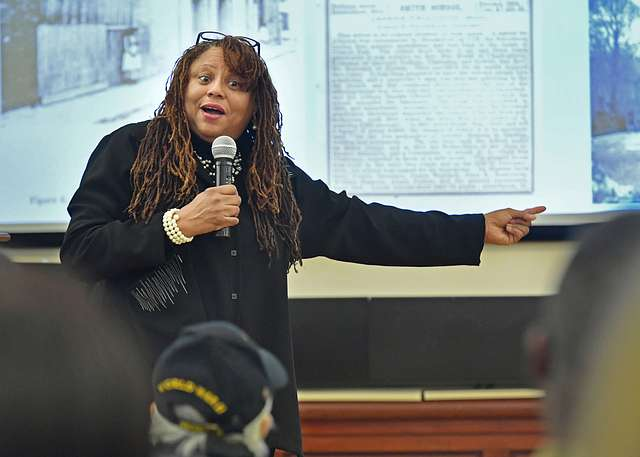
- Born: 1951; Jacksonville, Florida
- Known for: Fabric artist
- Website: lmerchiefrazier.org

L'Merchie Frazier (born 1951, Jacksonville, Florida) is an American artist, educator, and poet. She is best known for fiber art.

Frazier studied at the City College of New York, the University of Hartford, and the School of the Museum of Fine Arts.

Frazier is a past director of education at the Museum of African American History, Boston/Nantucket and the artist in residence for the city of Boston. As the Art Commissioner for the Commonwealth of Massachusetts, she is part of the Massachusetts Senate Art Committee. She is also the Executive Director of Creative and Strategic Partnerships at SPOKE Art. Her work was included in the 2020 exhibition We Are the Story presented by the Textile Center and the Women of Color Quilters Network in Minneapolis, Minnesota, as well as the 2021 exhibition Freedom Rising: I Am the Story at the Minneapolis Institute of Art.

She has taught at Pine Manor College, Wesleyan University, Bunker Hill Community College and MIT.

Frazier was the 2024 artist-in-residence at the Mississippi Museum of Art. The same year her work was included in the exhibition Subversive, Skilled, Sublime: Fiber Art by Women at the Renwick Gallery.

In 2025 her work was included in We Gather at the Edge: Contemporary Quilts by Black Women Artists at the Renwick.

In March 2025, she was awarded one of the inaugural Wagner Foundation's 2025 Arts Fellowships along with Wen-ti Tsen and Daniela Rivera; the award supports Boston-area artists that inspire social change.

Frazier's quilts are in the collection of the Minneapolis Institute of Art and Smithsonian American Art Museum.
