= Mary M. Frasier =

Mary M. Frasier (1938–2005) was a famous African American educator who specialized in the area of gifted education at the University of Georgia.

Frasier was born May 17, 1938, in South Carolina.

Frasier worked to elevate the educational standing of African Americans as well as other minority groups who pass through the educational system, and transformed how people viewed gifted children. She developed the Frasier Traits, Aptitudes, and Behaviors (F-TAB), which is an instrument used by many school systems to identify children for gifted educational services.

Frasier received a bachelor's in music education and a master's in guidance and counseling from South Carolina State College. She earned her PhD in educational psychology from the University of Connecticut.

She died February 3, 2005, in Athens, Georgia.
