= Fraser, New York =

Fraser is the name of two places in the State of New York in the United States of America:

- Fraser, Delaware County, New York
- Fraser, Livingston County, New York
