= Justice Fraser =

Justice Fraser or Justice Frazer may refer to:

- Franklin D. Fraser (1819–1879), associate justice of the Florida Supreme Court
- Thomas B. Fraser (1860–1925), associate justice of the South Carolina Supreme Court
- Robert S. Frazer (1849–1936), associate justice of the Supreme Court of Pennsylvania
- William C. Frazer (1776–1838), associate justice of the Wisconsin Territorial Supreme Court
