= Malaysia Federal Route 148 =

Road in Malaysia

Federal Route 148
- Jalan Bukit Fraser 2 (Jalan Baru Bukit Fraser) (Jalan Pechah Batu)

Route information
- Maintained by Malaysian Public Works Department
- Length: 9.00 km (5.59 mi)
- Existed: 1999–present
- History: Completed in 2001

Major junctions
- Summit end: Fraser's Hill
- FT 55 Federal Route 55; Jalan Quarry
- Downhill end: The Gap

Location
- Country: Malaysia
- Primary destinations: Kuala Kubu Bharu, Teranum, Raub

Highway system
- Highways in Malaysia; Expressways; Federal; State

Jalan Bukit Fraser 2, or Jalan Baru Bukit Fraser and Jalan Pechah Batu, Federal Route 148, is a second federal road in Fraser's Hill, Pahang, Malaysia, designed as a downhill route to Federal Route 55. It is maintained by the Malaysian Public Works Department (JKR) and the Fraser's Hill Development Corporation (FHDC). The Kilometre Zero of the Federal Route 148 starts at the peak of Fraser's Hill.

== Features ==
At most sections, the Federal Route 148 was built under the JKR R5 road standard, allowing maximum speed limit of up to 90 km/h.

== Junction lists ==
The entire route is located within the district of Raub, Pahang. All junctions listed are at-grade intersections unless stated otherwise.

| Location | km | mi | Name | Destinations | Notes |
|---|---|---|---|---|---|
| Fraser's Hill | 0.0 | 0.0 | Fraser's Hill | FT 55 Jalan Quarry (Quarry Road) – Shahzhan Inn, Ye Olde Smokehouse | T-junction |
| Fraser's Hill | | | Fraser Pine Resort | | |
| Fraser's Hill | | | SJKT Bukit Fraser | | |
| Fraser's Hill | | | Sungai Teranum bridge Viaduct | | |
| Fraser's Hill | | | The Gap | FT 55 Jalan Kuala Kubu Bharu-Raub – Kuala Kubu Bharu, Kuala Lumpur, Teranum, Raub | T-junction |
1.000 mi = 1.609 km; 1.000 km = 0.621 mi
