= Frazer =

Frazer may refer to:

== Places in the United States ==
- Frazer, Montana
- Frazer Township, Pennsylvania
- Frazer, Pennsylvania, a community in East Whiteland Township, Pennsylvania
- Frazer Corners, Wisconsin

== Other uses ==
- Frazer (automobile), a line of American automobiles
- Frazer (name)
- Frazer Nash, a British automobile manufacturer

== See also ==
- Fraser (disambiguation)
- Frazier (disambiguation)
- Frasier (disambiguation)
