= Dominique Falla =

Australian designer, artist, and academic

- Education: Swinburne University of Technology; Monash University; Griffith University
- Known for: Tactile typography, graphic design, illustration
- Movement: New aesthetic
- Website: www.dominiquefalla.com

Dominique Falla is an Australian designer, artist, and academic. She is best known for promoting the concept of "tactile typography," an artistic method that integrates traditional craft techniques with digital design principles. Falla is an associate professor of design at the Queensland College of Art and Design at Griffith University and founded Typism, an international community and platform for typography and lettering.

== Biography ==
=== Early life ===
Falla completed her undergraduate training in graphic design at Swinburne University of Technology during the early 1990s. She subsequently pursued postgraduate research, earning a Master of Design from Monash University in 2003 with a focus on production designs for a steampunk film. She later completed a Doctor of Visual Arts at Griffith University, where her doctoral research established the foundational framework for tactile typography.

Falla has held several academic and leadership positions within the Queensland College of Art and Design at Griffith University's Gold Coast campus. Her roles have included Program Director for the Bachelor of Digital Media and Deputy Director of Learning and Teaching. Her contemporary research interests focus on creative entrepreneurship, digital content strategy, and the mechanics of the creator economy. Falla also served as the chair person for the organising committee for the Association Typographique Internationale (ATypI) 2024 conference conducted in Brisbane.

=== Career ===
Following her undergraduate graduation, Falla spent thirteen years working professionally as a freelance illustrator, completing numerous editorial illustrations and children's books before establishing her own studio, Moonsail Design.

Her transition into tactile typography developed during her doctoral studies, as she experimented with translating digital typography into three-dimensional physical forms. Her practice often incorporates string art, the overlapping intersection of thread and nails—frequently used to build letterforms.

In March 2013, Falla founded Typism, an international community and platform dedicated to type design and lettering. The initiative began as an annual conference on the Gold Coast and has since expanded into a digital community that hosts online workshops, international summits, and a regular podcast. Typism regularly publishes curated book collections showcasing global lettering and provides educational content related to lettering and type design.
