= Margo Frasier =

American lawyer and former sheriff

Margo Frasier is an American lawyer and former sheriff. She was sheriff of Travis County, Texas (which includes the city of Austin) from 1997 through 2004.

== Career ==
Frasier, a lawyer, received a J.D. from the Florida State University College of Law.

She joined the Travis County Sheriff's Office as a sheriff's deputy, and eventually became the office's first female lieutenant and the first female captain. She was subsequently elected to two four-year terms as sheriff of Travis County, serving from 1997 through 2004. The sheriff's office had some 1,200 employees at the time of Frasier's tenure. Frasier, a Democrat, was the first woman and the first openly gay person in that post. She was also the first gay or lesbian person elected sheriff in the United States.

During her tenure, Frasier modernized the sheriff's office through greater use of technology and dealt with overcrowding and code violations at the county jail. During her tenure, the sheriff's office put cameras and computers in patrol cars for the first time. After leaving the sheriff's office, Frasier became a professor of criminal justice at Sam Houston State University in Huntsville, Texas. She later returned to Austin to become a consultant at a firm that advises law enforcement agencies. Frasier also testified as an expert witness in court cases.

In January 2011, Frasier became police monitor for the City of Austin. She was the fourth person to hold this post. As police monitor, Frasier had oversight over citizen complaints against the Austin Police Department. She retired from the Office of Police Monitor in January 2017, and later that year was appointed by U.S. District Judge Lance Africk to serve as the lead monitor overseeing the Orleans Parish Sheriff's Office under the terms of a 2013 settlement of a case between the Orleans sheriff's offices and jail inmates over poor conditions at the Orleans Parish Prison.

== Personal life ==
Frasier has a domestic partner and a daughter.
