= Frazier Park (Charlotte, North Carolina) =

Park in North Carolina, US

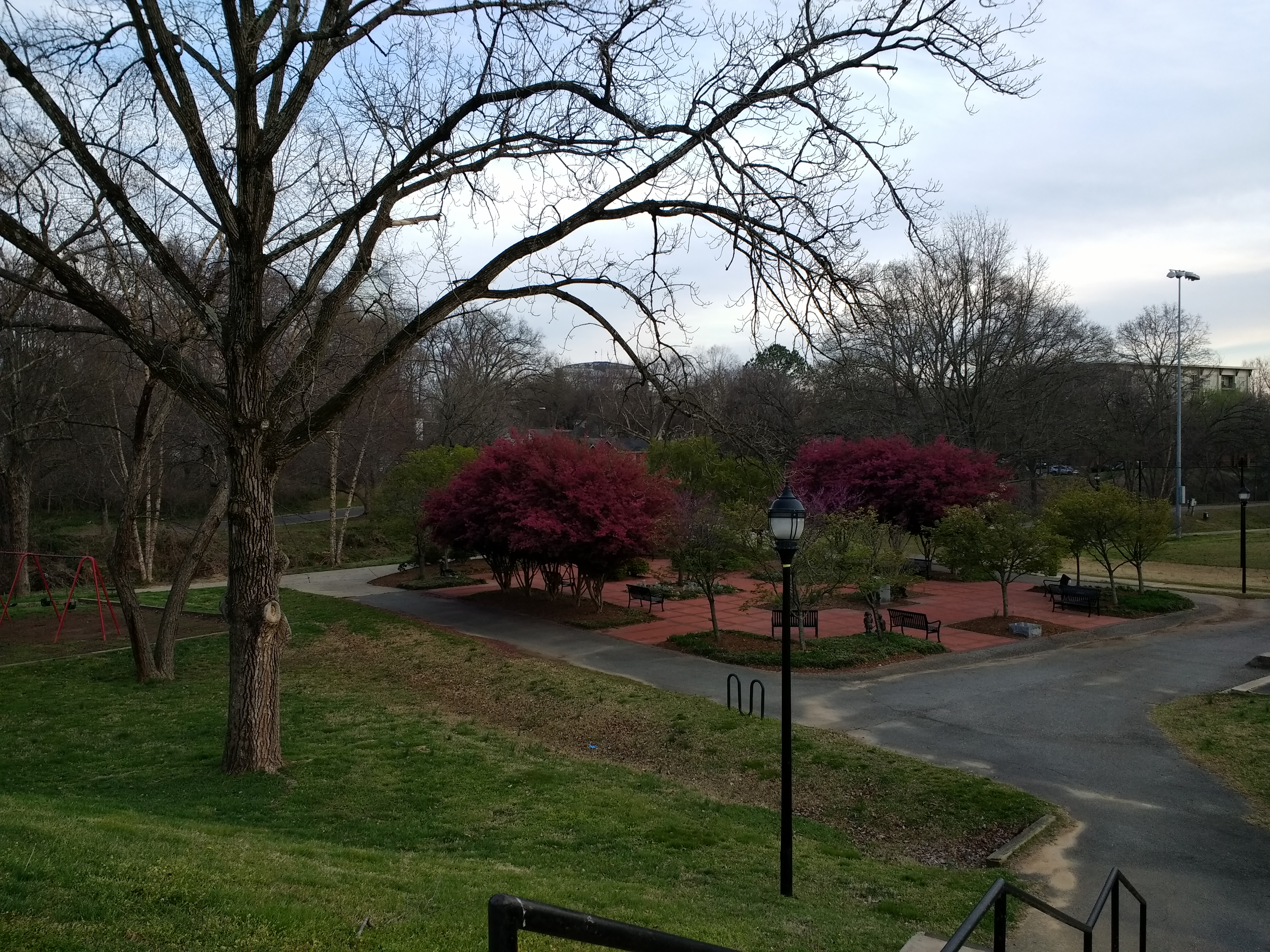
- Interactive map of Frazier Park
- Type: Public park
- Location: Charlotte, North Carolina
- Coordinates: 35.2328°N 80.8576°W
- Area: 16.5 acres (6.7 ha)
- Operator: Mecklenburg County Parks and Recreation
- Website: Frazier Park

Frazier Park is a 16.5-acre (6.7 ha) urban park at 1201 West 4th Street Ext in the Third Ward of Charlotte, North Carolina, United States. It contains fields for soccer and American football, courts for tennis and basketball, creek-side trails, a playground for small children, and a dog park. Part of Charlotte's Irwin Creek Greenway, a paved and gravel greenway, runs through Frazier Park.

Because they are directly adjacent to downtown Charlotte, Frazier Park and Marshall Park are occasionally used as city-approved staging grounds for demonstrations and protest marches.

== Children's Memorial Walkway ==
A special feature of Frazier Park is the Children's Memorial Walkway, a park within a park. Many of the bricks on this walk are engraved and honor the memory of children from Charlotte who have died for any reason — but especially those who have been murdered. Each January the families of homicide victims gather in Frazier Park for a ceremony of remembrance. The associated garden contains cherry trees, benches, sculptures of children at play, and an inscribed monument.
