= Fraisier =

French strawberries-and-cream cake

The fraisier is a strawberry cake made of an almond sponge cake or meringue, pastry cream, and strawberries. The pastry is typically made during strawberry season, as the crucial ingredient is the strawberries. The name derives from the French word for strawberries, fraises. It is a classic among French entremet desserts. According to the New York Times, the required construction is often elaborate.

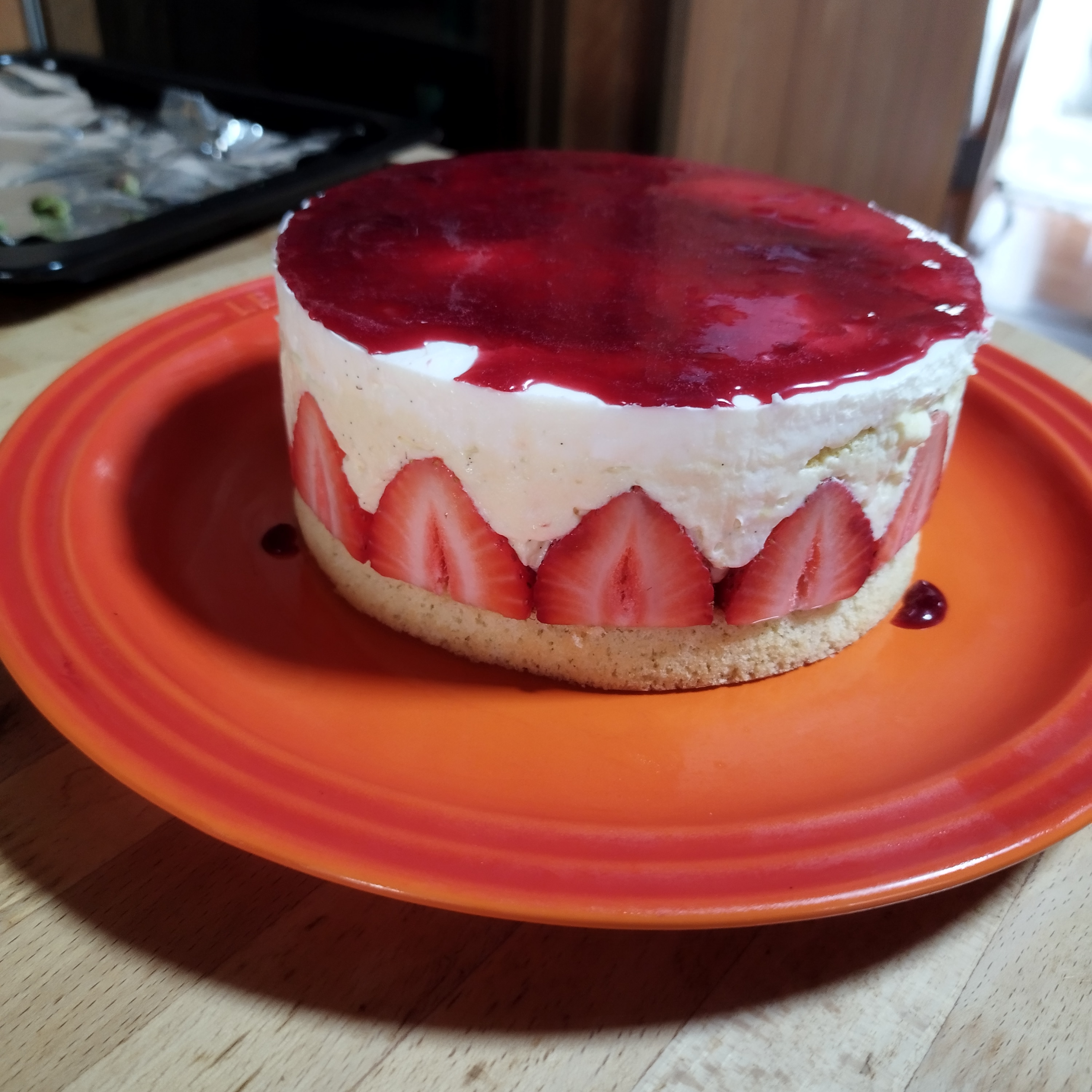
Fraisier (strawberry shortcake)

The cake's origin dates back to a cake created by Auguste Escoffier at the end of the 19th century that included fresh strawberries. The recipe appears in his Guide Culinaire. The initial version evolved as Pierre Lacam designed a strawberry cake with a sponge cake and a touch of kirsch in the 1900s.

The fraisier as known today was created only in 1966 by Gaston Lenôtre. He made a strawberry cake with a sponge cake punched with kirsch, buttercream, and fresh strawberries, then called Bagatelle, in reference to the gardens of Bagatelle located close to Paris.

== See also ==
- Eton Mess
- Strawberry shortcake
- Trifle
