= Malaysia Federal Route 56 =

Road in Malaysia

Federal Route 56
- Jalan Gap-Bukit Fraser

Route information
- Maintained by Malaysian Public Works Department
- Length: 7.72 km (4.80 mi)
- Existed: 1919–present

Major junctions
- Summit end: Fraser's Hill
- FT 55 Federal Route 55; Jalan Genting; Jalan Lady Guillemard; FT 148 Federal Route 148
- Downhill end: The Gap

Location
- Country: Malaysia
- Primary destinations: English Cottage, Hill Resorts

Highway system
- Highways in Malaysia; Expressways; Federal; State

Jalan Bukit Fraser 1 or Jalan Gap-Bukit Fraser, Federal Route 56, is a federal road in Fraser's Hill, both in Selangor and Pahang state, Malaysia. Unlike most federal roads in Malaysia, Jalan Bukit Fraser is a single-lane federal road, which direction was used to be reversed hourly before the newer Jalan Bukit Fraser 2 route 148 was completed in 2001 for downhill traffic. Now the road is used for uphill traffic at all times. The road is only open during daytime for safety reasons. It is maintained by the Malaysian Public Works Department (JKR) and the Fraser's Hill Development Corporation (FHDC).

== Route background ==
The Kilometre Zero of the Federal Route 56 starts at The Gap.

== History ==
The road was constructed by the British on 1919. In 1919, work started on the access road to the hill station from The Gap and by 1922, the hill station named Fraser's Hill was opened to visitors.

== Features ==
- Fraser's Hill border marker line between Selangor and Pahang.

At most sections, the Federal Route 56 was built under the JKR R1 road standard, allowing maximum speed limit of up to 40 km/h.

== Junction lists ==
The entire route is located within the district of Raub, Pahang. All junctions listed are at-grade intersections unless stated otherwise.

Legend:

- I/C - Interchange, I/S - Intersection, RSA - Rest and service area, OBR - Overhead bridge restaurant, R/R - Restaurant and rest plaza, L/B - Layby, V/P - Vista point, TN - tunnel, T/P - Toll plaza, BR - Bridge
- C - Cloverleaf, S - Stack, T-A - Trumpet-A, T-B - Trumpet-B, DT - Directional-T/Y, SDT - Semi-Directional-T/Y, P-Y - Partial-Y, D - Diamond, P-C - Partial cloverleaf, D-D - Diverging diamond, D-R - Direct ramp

State	District	Location	km	mi	Name	Destinations	Notes
Selangor	Hulu Selangor	The Gap	0.0	0.0	The Gap	FT 55 Malaysia Federal Route 55	Entry only from FT55
Selangor	Hulu Selangor	Fraser's Hill			Fraser's Hill; Jalan Mager (Mager Road)	Jalan Mager (Mager Road) – Banglo Sultan Sulaiman (Selangor State Rest House), Sri Berkat Rest House	T-junctions
Pahang	Raub	Fraser's Hill			Fraser's Hill border marker line		
Pahang	Raub	Fraser's Hill			Fraser's Hill	Fraser's Hill police station Fraser's Hill fire station	
Pahang	Raub	Fraser's Hill	7.72	4.80	Fraser's Hill; Fraser's Hill Town Centre (Fraser's Hill clock tower)	Jalan Genting (Genting Road) – Puncak Inn, Jeriau Waterfall, Ye Olde Smokehouse, Pine Tree Trail; Jalan Lady Guillemard (Lady Guillemard Road) – Shahzan Inn, The Gap, Kuala Kubu Bharu, Raub, Kuala Lumpur	Roundabout
1.000 mi = 1.609 km; 1.000 km = 0.621 mi: Incomplete access

== Gallery ==
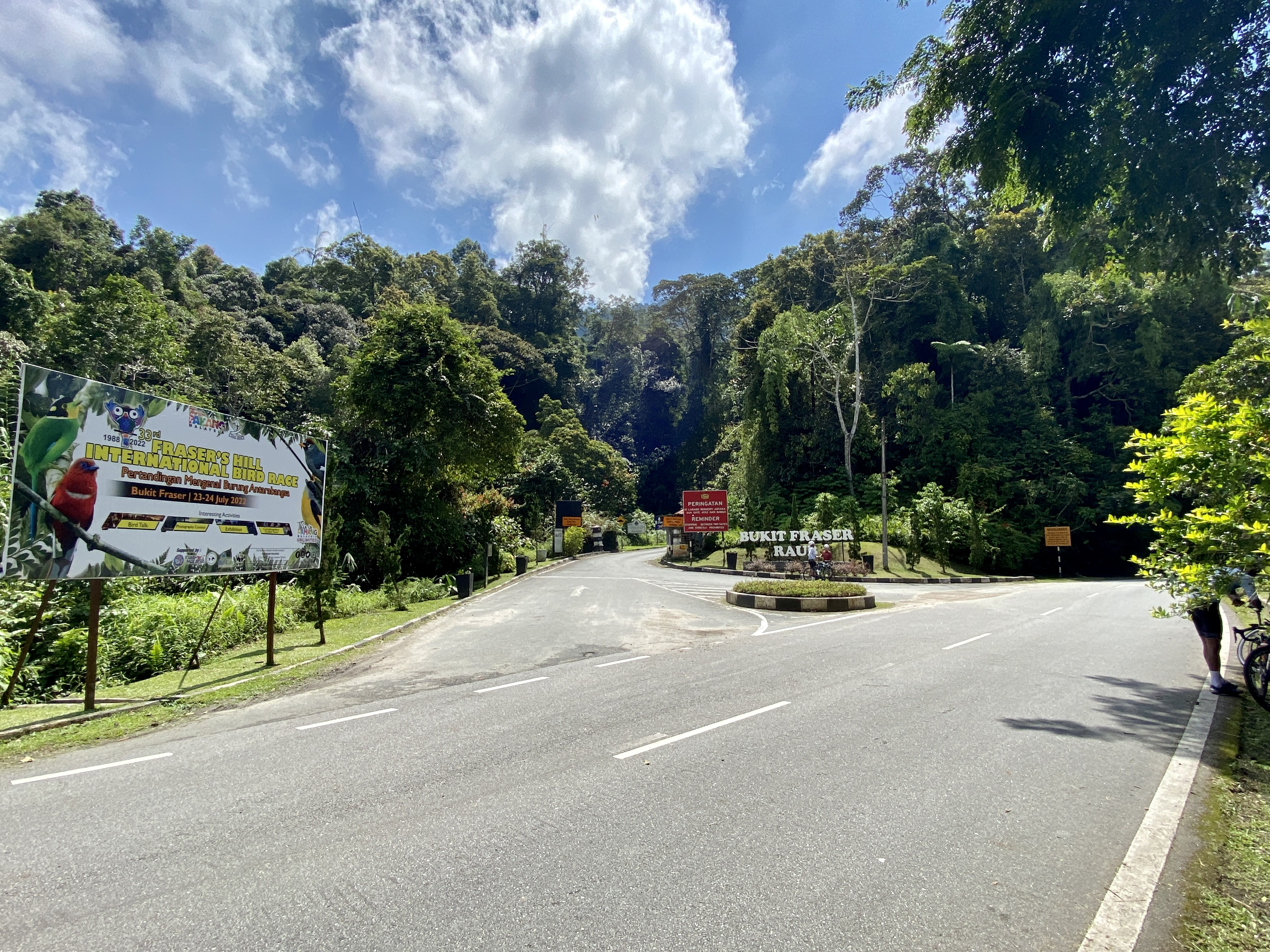
Route 56 intersection with Route 55 (foreground) at The Gap.

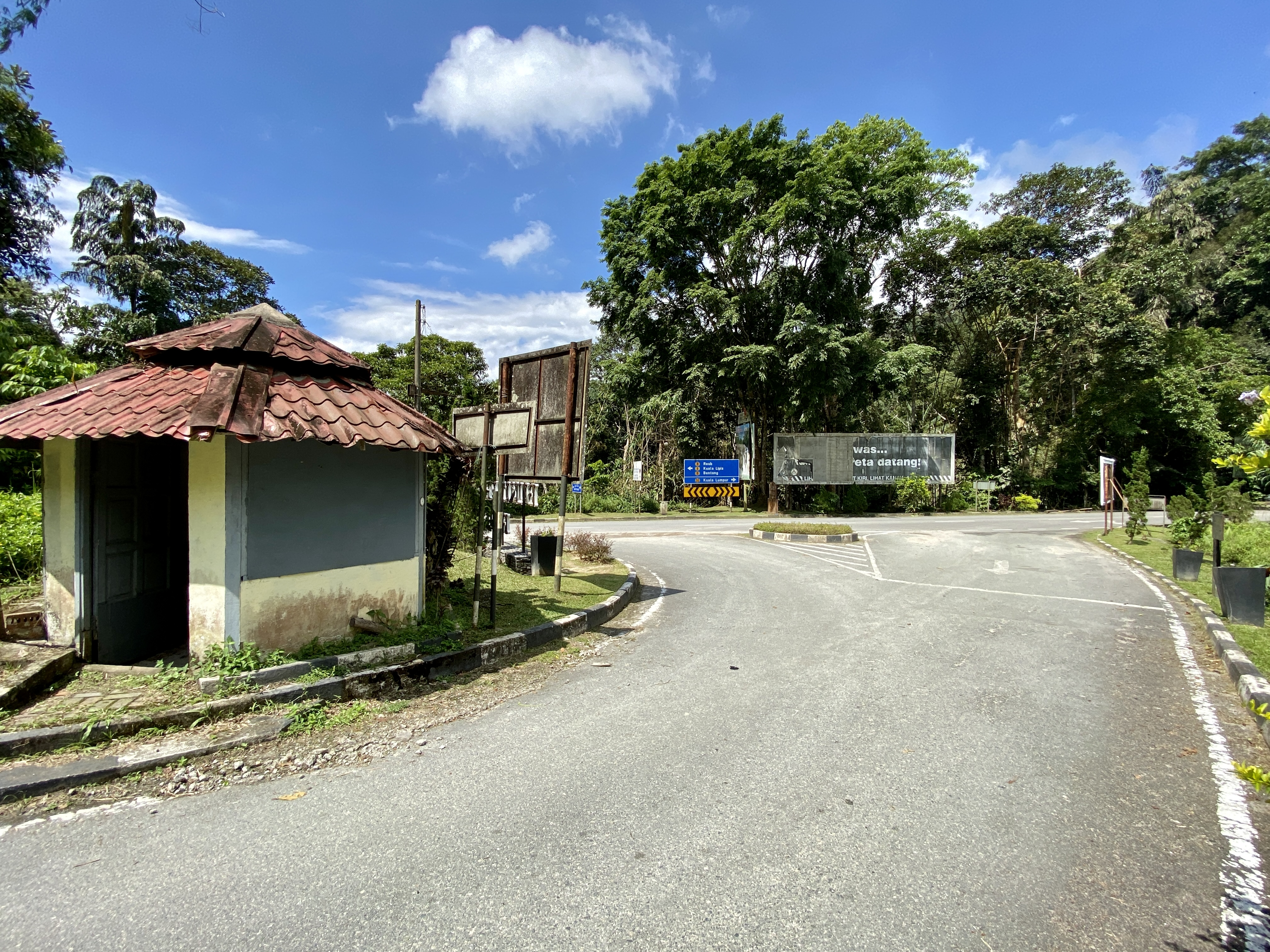
View back towards the intersection with Route 55.

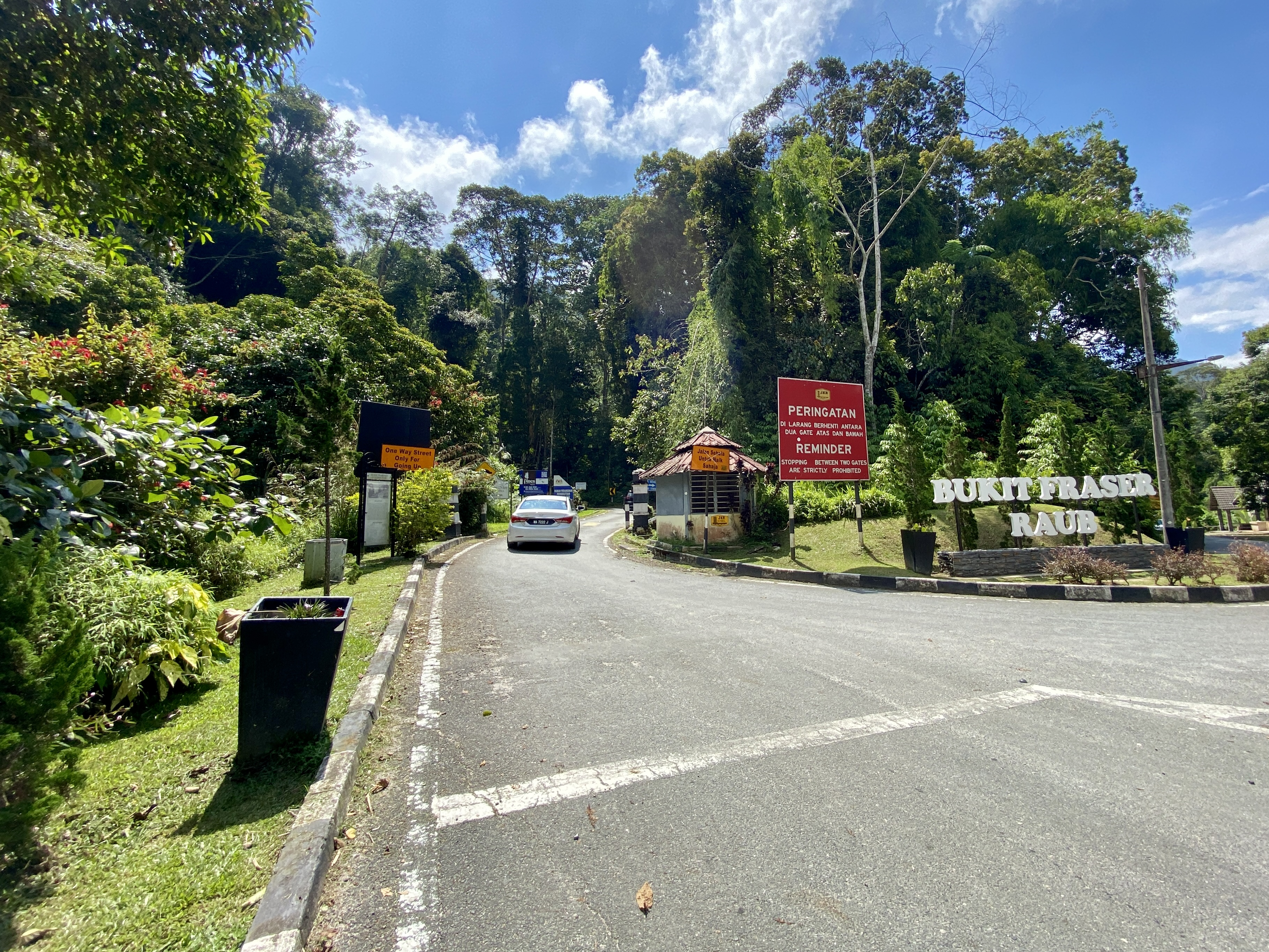
Start of Route 56 just after the intersection.

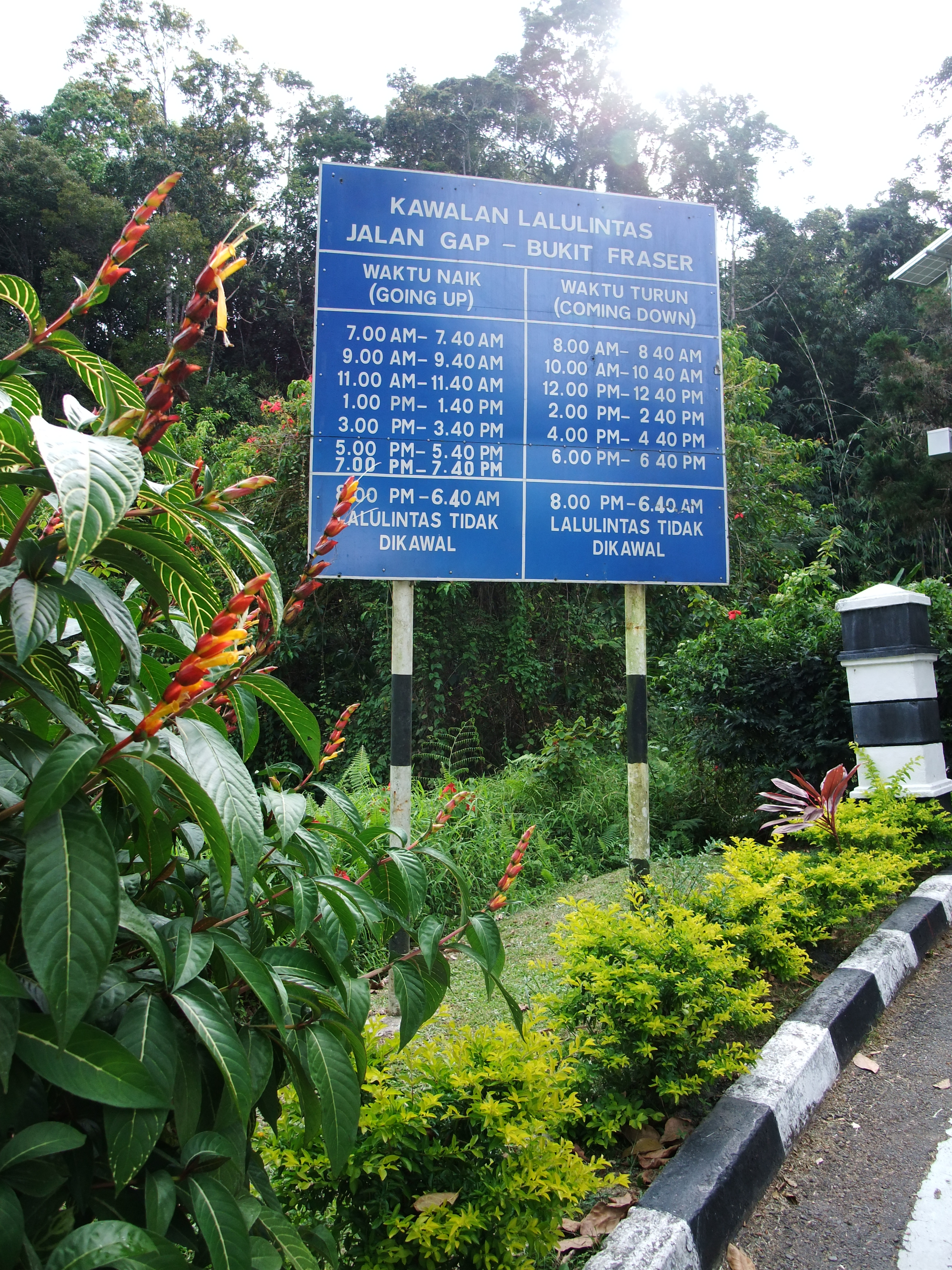
Traffic direction timetable when Route 55 was used for both directions.

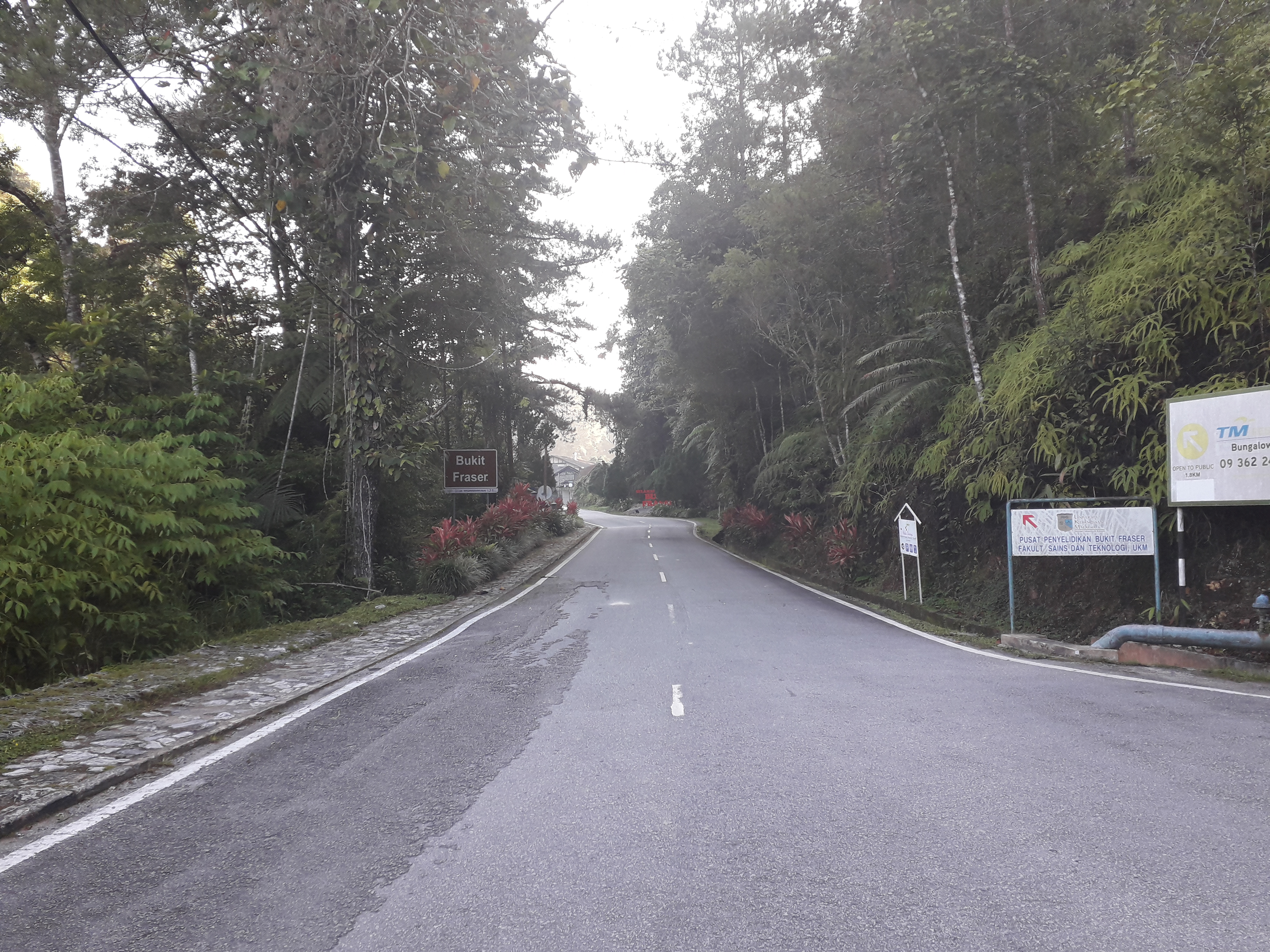
Arriving at Fraser's Hill.

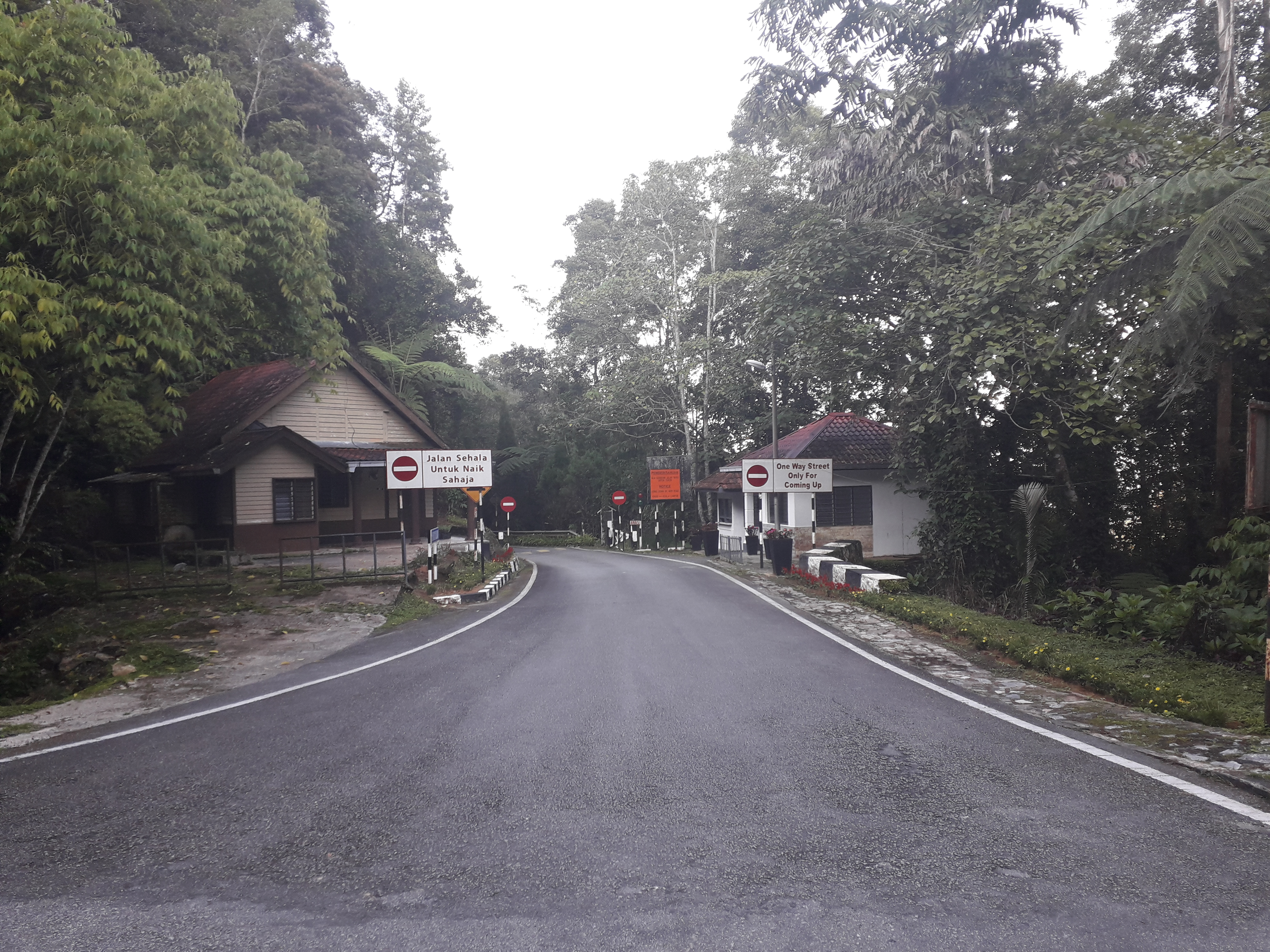
Traffic control gate at Fraser's Hill.

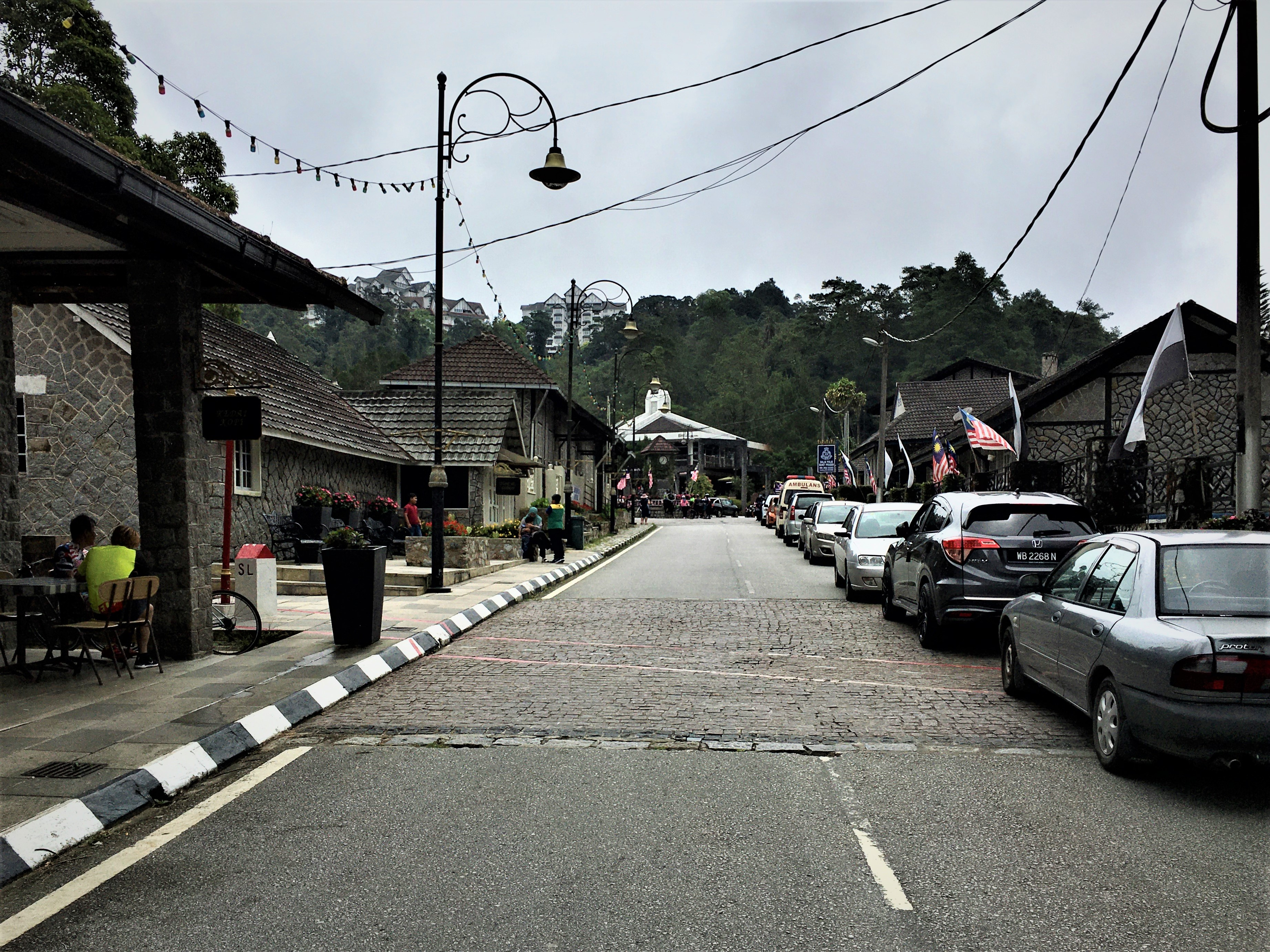
Crossing the Pahang-Selangor border at Fraser's Hill.

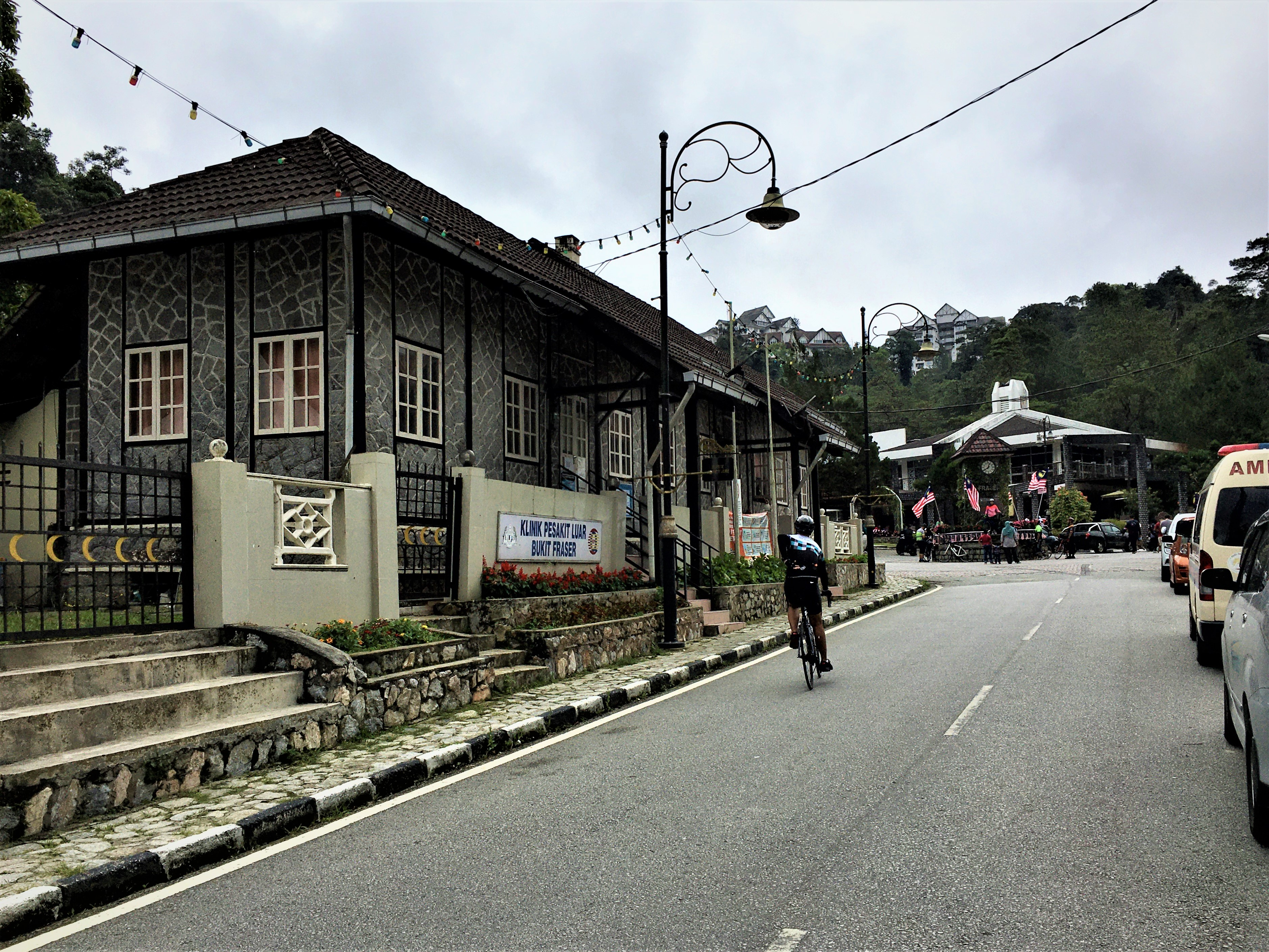
End of Route 56 at the Clocktower roundabout at Fraser's Hill.
