= Index of Selangor-related articles =

The following is an alphabetical list of articles related to Selangor.

== 0-9 ==
- 1 Utama
- 1974 Federal Territory of Kuala Lumpur Agreement
- 1998 Klang Valley water crisis
- 2014 Negeri Sembilan and Selangor water crisis

== A ==
- Abdul Samad of Selangor
- AEON Bukit Tinggi Shopping Centre
- Al-Falah Mosque, Selangor
- Al-Madinah International University
- Ampang (state constituency)
- Ampang and Sri Petaling lines
- Ampang Jaya Municipal Council
- Ampang Recreational Forest
- Ampang, Selangor
- Assunta Hospital

== B ==
- Bandar Baru Klang
- Bandar Bukit Tinggi
- Bandar Klang (state constituency)
- Bandar Saujana Putra
- Bandar Sri Damansara
- Bandar Sunway
- Bandar Utama
- Batu 11 Cheras
- Batu 20, Kuang
- Batu Caves
- Batu Caves (town)
- Batu Dam
- Batu Tiga
- Beranang
- British Malaya
- Bukit Melawati (state constituency)
- Bukit Raja

== C ==
- Chempaka (Selangor state constituency)
- Conference of Rulers
- Country Heights
- Cyberjaya
- Cyberjaya University College of Medical Sciences

== D ==
- Damansara, Selangor
- Damansara-Puchong Expressway
- Dengkil
- Duli Yang Maha Mulia
- Duta-Ulu Klang Expressway

== E ==
- Elections in Selangor
- Empire Subang

== F ==
- Family tree of the Malay monarchs
- Federation of Malaya
- Federated Malay States
- Federated Malay States Railways
- Flag and coat of arms of Selangor
- Football Association of Selangor
- Forest Research Institute Malaysia (FRIM)
- Frank Swettenham

== G ==
- Gabai River
- German-Malaysian Institute
- Gombak (federal constituency)
- Gombak (town)
- Gombak District
- Gurdwara Sahib Klang

== H ==
- Hisamuddin of Selangor
- History of Malaysia
- Hulu Langat (federal constituency)
- Hulu Langat District
- Hulu Selangor (federal constituency)
- Hulu Selangor by-election, 2010
- Hulu Selangor District
- Hulu Selangor District Council

== I ==
- I-City
- Ibrahim Shah of Selangor
- Ijok (state constituency)
- Infrastructure University Kuala Lumpur
- International Islamic University of Malaysia
- International University College of Technology Twintech
- INTI International University
- IOI Mall Puchong
- IPC Shopping Centre
- Istana Alam Shah
- Istana Bukit Kayangan
- Istana Darul Ehsan

== J ==
- Jalan Ampang
- Jalan Ampang-Hulu Langat
- Jalan Batang Kali-Genting Highlands
- Jalan Batang Kali-Ulu Yam
- Jalan Batu Tiga Lama
- Jalan Besar Salak
- Jalan Hulu Langat
- Jalan Kerja Ayer Lama
- Jalan Klang Lama
- Jalan Kuala Selangor-Bestari Jaya
- Jalan Rawang-Bestari Jaya
- Jalan Sabak Bernam-Hulu Selangor
- Jalan Sultan Abdul Samad, Kuala Lumpur
- Jalan Sungai Tengi
- Jalan Sungai Tua
- Jalan Ulu Yam
- Japanese occupation of Malaya
- Jenjarom
- Jeram (state constituency)
- Jugra

== K ==
- Kajang
- Kajang Hospital
- Kajang Municipal Council
- Kampung Kuantan
- Kampung Sungai Pusu
- Kapar
- Kapar (federal constituency)
- KDU University College
- Kelana Jaya line
- Kerling, Selangor
- Klang (city)
- Klang (federal constituency)
- Klang-Banting Highway
- Klang Bell
- Klang District
- Klang Gates Dam
- Klang High School
- Klang Komuter station
- Klang Municipal Council
- Klang Parade
- Klang River
- Klang Royal Town Mosque
- Klang Sentral
- Klang Valley
- Klang War
- Kolej Universiti Islam Antarabangsa Selangor
- Kota Darul Ehsan
- Kota Kemuning
- Kota Raja (Selangor state constituency)
- Kuala Kubu Bharu
- Kuala Langat (federal constituency)
- Kuala Langat District
- Kuala Langat District Council
- Kuala Lumpur
- Kuala Lumpur-Kuala Selangor Expressway
- Kuala Lumpur International Airport
- Kuala Selangor
- Kuala Selangor (federal constituency)
- Kuala Selangor District
- Kuala Selangor District Council
- Kuala Selangor Nature Park
- Kuala Sungai Buloh
- Kuang (town)
- Kundang

== L ==
- Langat River
- Laws of the Constitution of Selangor 1959
- List related to Selangor
  - List of bus routes in Kuala Lumpur
  - List of honours of the Selangor Royal Family by country
  - List of Menteris Besar of Selangor
  - List of monarchies
  - List of people on the postage stamps of Malaysia
  - List of post-nominal letters (Selangor)
  - List of postal codes in Malaysia
  - List of schools in Selangor
  - List of tourist attractions in Selangor
- Limkokwing University of Creative Technology

== M ==
- Malay Annals
- Malaya Command
- Malayan El'Clasico
- Malayan Union
- Malaysia
- Malaysia University of Science & Technology
- Mines Wellness City
- Management and Science University
- Merdeka Square, Kuala Lumpur
- Mestika Palace
- Monarchies in Malaysia
- Morib
- MPPJ F.C.
- Muhammad Shah of Selangor
- Multimedia University
- Musa Ghiatuddin Riayat Shah of Selangor

== N ==
- National Zoo of Malaysia
- National University of Malaysia
- Nature Sites in Selangor
- New Klang Valley Expressway
- New North Klang Straits Bypass
- North Klang Straits Bypass

== O ==
- Order of precedence in Selangor
- Order of Sultan Salahuddin Abdul Aziz Shah
- Order of Sultan Sharafuddin Idris Shah
- Order of the Crown of Selangor
- Orders, decorations, and medals of Selangor
- Orders, decorations, and medals of the Malaysian states and federal territories

== P ==
- Pandamaran
- Pelabuhan Kelang (federal constituency)
- Pelabuhan Klang (state constituency)
- Peninsular Malaysia
- Perbadanan Kemajuan Negeri Selangor Sports Complex
- Permaisuri Siti Aishah
- Perodua
- Petaling (federal constituency)
- Petaling District
- Petaling Jaya
- Petaling Jaya (federal constituency)
- Petaling Jaya City Council
- Petaling Jaya Selatan (federal constituency)
- Petaling Jaya Utara (federal constituency)
- PKNS F.C.
- Port Klang
- Port Klang Komuter station
- PROTON Holdings
- Public Bank F.C.
- Puchong
- Puchong (federal constituency)
- Puchong Jaya
- Pulau Meranti
- Puchong Perdana
- Pulau Ketam
- Putra Heights
- Putra Heights LRT station
- Putrajaya

== R ==
- Raja Lumu
- Rasa, Malaysia
- Rawang (federal constituency)
- Rawang, Selangor
- Rojak Klang
- Royal Family Order of Selangor
- Royal Selangor
- Royal Selangor Club
- Royal Selangor Golf Club

== S ==
- Sabak (state constituency)
- Sabak Bernam (federal constituency)
- Sabak Bernam District
- Sabak Bernam District Council
- Salahuddin of Selangor
- Salak Tinggi
- SEGi University
- Sekinchan
- Selangor Council of the Royal Court
- Selangor FA
- Selangor FM
- Selangor honours list
- Selangor Labour Party
- Selangor League
- Selangor Masters
- Selangor River
- Selangor royal family
- Selangor State Development Corporation
- Selangor state election, 2018
- Selangor State Executive Council
- Selangor State Legislative Assembly
- Selangor State Park
- Selangor State Route B9
- Selangor Sultanate
- Selangor Turf Club
- Selangor United
- Selangor water works
- Selayang
- Selayang (federal constituency)
- Selayang Municipal Council
- Semenyih Dam
- Sepang (federal constituency)
- Sepang District
- Sepang Municipal Council
- Sepang International Circuit
- Serdang (federal constituency)
- Serdang (Selangor state constituency)
- Serdang Hospital
- Serendah
- Seri Kembangan
- Seri Serdang (state constituency)
- Shah Alam
- Shah Alam (federal constituency)
- Shah Alam Circuit
- Shah Alam City Council
- Shah Alam Stadium
- Sharafuddin of Selangor
- Sijangkang
- Simpang Airport
- South Klang Valley Expressway
- SPCA Selangor, Malaysia
- SplashMania Waterpark
- State legislative assemblies of Malaysia
- States and federal territories of Malaysia
- Subang Jaya
- Subang Jaya Municipal Council
- Subang Parade
- Subang, Selangor
- Sulaiman of Selangor
- Sultan Abdul Aziz Royal Gallery
- Sultan Abdul Aziz Shah Airport
- Sultan Abdul Samad Building
- Sultan Abdul Samad Mausoleum
- Sultan of Selangor Cup
- Sultan Salahuddin Abdul Aziz Mosque
- Sultan Salahuddin Abdul Aziz Shah Building
- Sungai Besar
- Sungai Buloh
- Sungai Buloh Hospital
- Sungai Buloh–Kajang MRT line
- Sungai Choh
- Sungai Pinang (Selangor state constituency)
- Sunway Lagoon
- Sunway Pyramid
- Sunway University

== T ==
- Taman Sri Muda
- Taman Templer (state constituency)
- Tanjung Harapan
- Tanjung Sepat, Selangor
- Taylor's University
- Telephone numbers in Malaysia
- Teluk Datok
- Tengku Amir Shah
- Tengku Ampuan Jemaah
- Tengku Ampuan Rahimah
- Tengku Ampuan Rahimah Hospital
- Tengku Permaisuri Norashikin
- Tengku Putra
- Tengku Sulaiman Shah
- Tengku Zatashah
- The Curve (shopping mall)
- Tun Abdul Razak University
- Tun Perak
- TVSelangor

== U ==
- UCSI University
- UEP Subang Jaya
- Ulu Klang
- Ulu Yam
- Universiti Putra Malaysia
- Universiti Teknologi MARA
- Universiti Tenaga Nasional
- Universiti Tunku Abdul Rahman
- University of Selangor

== Y ==
- Yang di-Pertuan Agong
- Yap Ah Loy

== See also ==
- Topic overview:
  - Selangor
  - Outline of Selangor
