= Klang River =

River in Kuala Lumpur and Selangor, Malaysia

Coordinates: 3°00′N 101°23′E

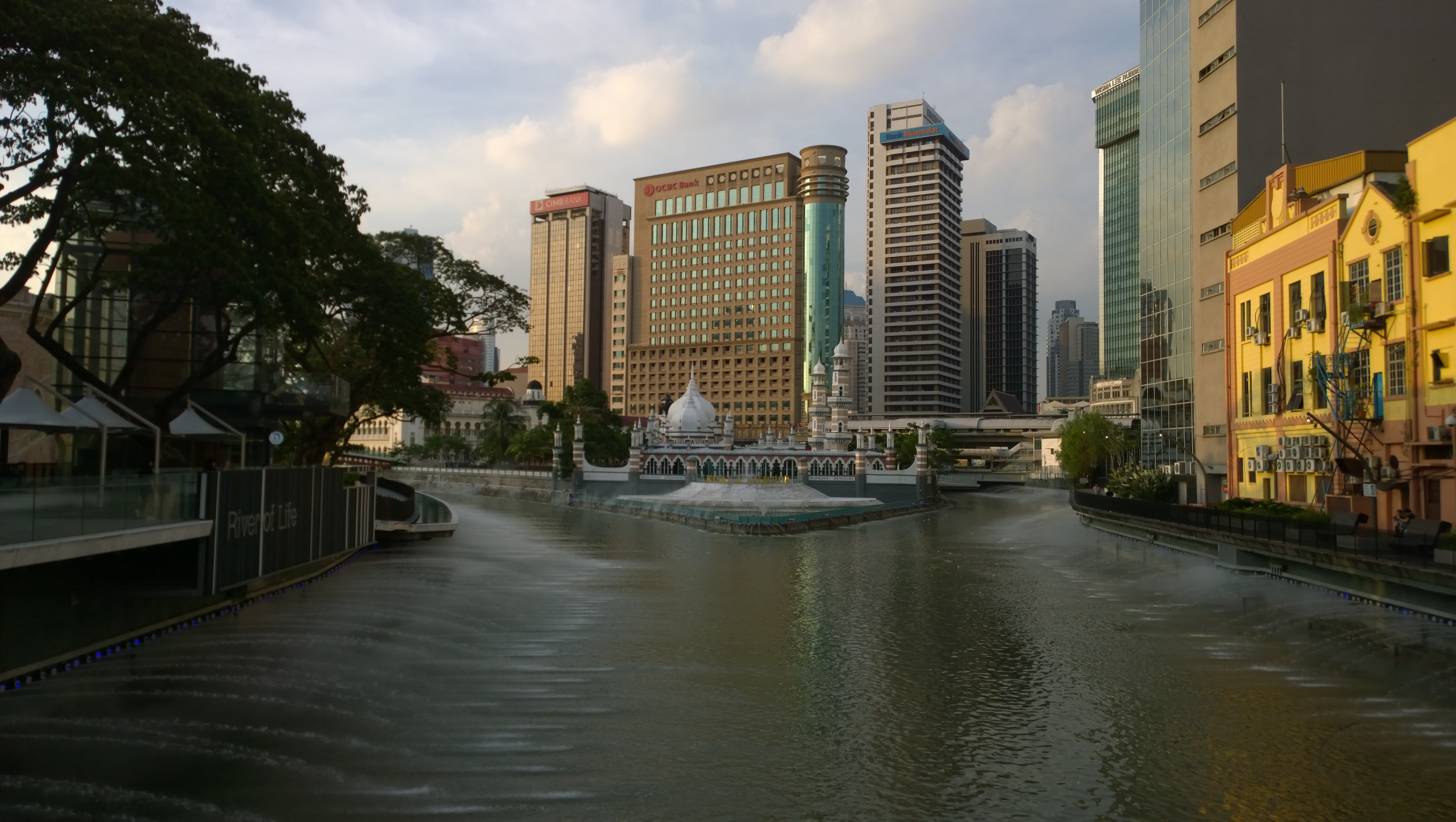
- The Gombak River (left) merges with the Klang River (right) at Kuala Lumpur.
- Native name: Sungai Klang (Malay)

Location
- Country: Selangor and Kuala Lumpur, Malaysia

Physical characteristics
- Source
  - location: Kuala Seleh
  - elevation: 100 m (330 ft)
- Mouth
  - location: Port Swettenham
- Length: 120 km (75 mi)
- Discharge
  - average: 50 m^{3}/s (1,800 cu ft/s)

Basin features
- Tributaries
  - left: Gombak River, Damansara River, Penchala River
  - right: Kerayong River

The Klang River (Malay: Sungai Klang) flows through Kuala Lumpur and Selangor in Malaysia and eventually flows into the Straits of Malacca. It is approximately 120 km (75 mi) in length and drains a basin of about 1,288 km^{2} (497 sq mi). The Klang River has 11 major tributaries.

Because the river flows through the densely populated Klang Valley, home to more than four million people, it is heavily polluted. Significant siltation has resulted from human waste discharged by informal settlers along the riverbanks, as well as from certain business establishments lacking septic tanks or sewage treatment facilities. Additional sediment is carried into the river by mudflows from surrounding mountains. Intensive development has also narrowed several stretches of the river, causing it to resemble a large storm drain in some areas. These factors contribute to frequent flash floods in Kuala Lumpur, particularly following heavy rainfall.

== Course ==
Location of the Klang River

The Klang River originates in the Klang Gates Quartz Ridge in Gombak, near the border with Pahang, 25 kilometres (16 mi) northeast of Kuala Lumpur. It is joined by 11 major tributaries. These include the Gombak River, Batu River, Kerayong River, Damansara River, Keruh River, Kuyoh River, Penchala River and Ampang River. It flows into the Straits of Malacca to the west.

== Places named after the river ==
The river's confluence with the Gombak River gave rise to the name of Kuala Lumpur, Malaysia's capital city. Kuala Lumpur means "muddy estuary", a description that still resonates today owing to the significant siltation noted above. It is also thought that Klang town is named after the river.

== Cities and towns on its banks ==
The river begins in Ampang Jaya, Selangor, and then follows the alignment of the Ampang–Kuala Lumpur Elevated Highway toward the city centre.

Kuala Lumpur is located at the confluence of the Gombak River and the Klang River, a point situated behind Masjid Jamek. From there, the Klang River flows south‑west through Brickfields, Bangsar, Lembah Pantai, Old Klang Road, and Jalan Puchong. It then forms the boundary between Petaling Jaya and Subang Jaya up to PJS7, before passing UEP Subang Jaya and looping through Puchong and Putra Heights.

Further downstream, the river continues through Selangor’s state capital, Shah Alam. The city of Klang lies along the lower reaches of the river.

Malaysia’s largest seaport, Port Klang, is located at the estuary of the Klang River.

== Dams ==
Two major dams lie upstream along the river: the Batu Dam and the Klang Gates Dam. Both structures supply water to the Klang Valley and play an important role in flood mitigation.

== Privatisation ==
The maintenance of the Klang River was privatised from 1996 onwards. Under 30-year concessions, three firms were to manage a river each and ensure cleanliness.

== Flood control ==
Historically, Kuala Lumpur has often suffered from severe flooding from the river water overflowing the banks. In 1926, a particularly severe flood hit Kuala Lumpur, and work on the river then began in an attempt to reduce the risk of flooding.

Part of the Klang River between the Gombak-Klang confluence and Brickfields was straightened, with a channel (part of which runs beside the present Jalan Syed Putra) including flood retention banks being dug to divert the river. This project was completed in 1932. Other stretches downstream and upstream, such as between Abdullah Hukum/Mid Valley Megamall, and from Kampung Baru to Dato' Keramat were also straightened between independence and the 1980s.

=== Kuala Lumpur Flood Mitigation ===
Efforts in controlling flood water is continuing process. Kuala Lumpur Flood Mitigation is a project to mitigate flash floods affecting Kuala Lumpur. In include diverting flood water from the Gombak River into a few stormwater ponds located in Batu, Jinjang and Kepong.

=== SMART Tunnel ===
The SMART Tunnel (Stormwater Management and Road Tunnel) is part of Kuala Lumpur Flood Mitigation Project and functions to reduce both traffic congestion and flooding. It is a submerged tunnel which can carry both vehicular traffic as well as storm runoff on a lower level. When regular drainage infrastructure is overwhelmed, vehicles are evacuated from the tunnel and the entire tube is used as a gigantic storm drain to prevent Kuala Lumpur from flooding. It diverts water flow from the Kampung Berembang Lake, near the Klang River, to Taman Desa Lake, which is near the Kerayong River (one of the Klang River's tributaries). Water flow can also go the opposite direction, from the Kerayong River to the Klang River. SMART opened in May 2007.

=== Clean up efforts ===
In 2010 Selangor has a stimulus bill that included money to help rehabilitate it. The river's condition has been described as "between critical and bad" by Gareth Jones of Wessex Water, a UK-based company that is participating in the project. Kamal Zaharin, the project mastermind, states that the plans include river cleaning, new source of drinking water, environmental protection, flood mitigation, commercial, tourism and land development activities. Gareth Jones also stated that they plan on tapping groundwater in order to have a source of water that is not the sea. The project has been estimated to require 15 years and attract 15 billion dollars of investment.

Since 2019, two units of The Interceptor, a solar-powered river cleaning machine which is the brainchild of Dutch-based non-profit organisation The Ocean Cleanup were installed at the river stretch behind Klang Royal Town Mosque and near Parang Bridge in Port Klang. The total amount of garbage collected from the river between 2019 and 2023 was 87,682 tonnes.

== See also ==
- Water supply and sanitation in Malaysia
