= Selangor water works =

Water supply in Selangor, Malaysia

The Selangor water works provides water supply to the state of Selangor as well as the federal territories of Kuala Lumpur and Putrajaya in Malaysia. The raw water is sourced mostly from surface water collected by several dams, lakes and rivers, and treated at the nearby water treatment plants. The Selangor water works is run by Pengurusan Air Selangor Sdn Bhd (Air Selangor), a Selangor State-owned company.

- Sungai Selangor Dam & Sungai Tinggi Dam
  - Dam capacity 344,529 million litres.
  - Water treatment plant (Sungai Selangor WTP) capacity; WTP1 = 950 million litres per day (mld), WTP2 950 mld, WTP3 = 800 mld.
  - Area served : Klang valley, Kuala Selangor, Hulu Selangor.
- Semenyih Dam
  - Dam capacity 59,071 million litres.
  - Treatment plant (Semenyih WTP) capacity = 545 million liters per day (mld).
  - Area served : Putrajaya, Hulu Langat, Kuala Langat, Sepang, Petaling.
- Sungai Langat Dam
  - Dam capacity 33,785 million litres.
  - Treatment plant (Sungai Langat WTP) capacity = 386 million litres per day (mld).
  - Area served : Hulu Langat, Cheras.
- Klang Gates Dam
  - Dam capacity 25,104 million litres.
  - Treatment plant (Bukit Nanas WTP) capacity = 145 million litres per day (mld).
  - Area served : Kuala Lumpur.
- Subang Dam
  - Dam capacity xx, xxx million litres.
  - Treatment plant (North Hammock WTP) capacity = xxx million litres per day (mld).
  - Area served : Kapar, Meru.
- Sungai Batu Dam
  - Dam capacity 30,199 million litres.
  - Treatment plant (Sungai Batu WTP) capacity = 114 million litres per day (mld).
  - Area served : Gombak.
- Sungai Rasa WTP capacity = 250 million litres per day.
- Combined production of 26 small WTP = 336 million liters per day.
