= IWK =

IWK may refer to:

- IWK Health Centre
- Indah Water Konsortium
- Indigenous Weather Knowledge
- Industrie-Werke Karlsruhe
- Initiativen Wirtschaft für Kunst
- Institut für Wiener Klangstil (Institute for Viennese Sound Style IWK)
- IATA code for Marine Corps Air Station Iwakuni
