= 2014 Negeri Sembilan and Selangor water crisis =

Water shortage in Malaysia

The 2014 Negeri Sembilan and Selangor water crisis was a water crisis that began in the Malaysian states of Negeri Sembilan and Selangor and lasted from February to August 2014. Its roots can be traced to hot and dry climatic conditions in Peninsular Malaysia in early 2014, but other factors, including water infrastructure problems and political deadlock in negotiations between the government and private water concessionaires also played central roles. It was the worst water crisis in the state since the 1998 Klang Valley water crisis.

== Causes ==
=== Meteorological background ===
Peninsular Malaysia experienced unusually hot and dry weather in early 2014, with a lack of rainfall in key catchment areas from which the water supply was sourced. Early speculations linked the dry weather to the El Niño effect, but no El Niño emerged in 2014.

=== Treatment plant shutdown ===
Offline treatment plants have been an ongoing problem in Selangor. In February 2014 two plants in the state were shut down due to ammonia contamination.

=== Politics ===
84% of the Selangor people believe that politics were the main factor responsible for the escalation of water shortages to crisis-level. Disagreements between Syarikat Bekalan Air Selangor (SYABAS) and the state government slowed progress toward a stable water supply. The deadlines for agreement on a water distribution restructuring deal between the government and water concessionaires were postponed several times, while water supply to many households continued to be intermittent.

== Effects ==
=== Negeri Sembilan ===
In Negeri Sembilan, the seven reservoir dams in the state suffered a substantial drop in water level. More than 8,000 homes were affected particularly in the areas of Sendayan, Rasah, Mambau and Seremban. On 19 February 2014, Negeri Sembilan Menteri Besar (Chief Minister), Mohamad Hassan declared a state of crisis following the water shortage – the worst the state has seen in decades.

The announcement had to be made after taps ran dry in several thousand households, due to the unusually long dry spell which has resulted in several water catchment areas drying up.

Natural-disaster relief personnel were dispatched to supply potable water to 8,000 households.

=== Selangor ===
==== Immediate ====
As river sources dried up, water levels fell to critical levels in seven of the state's dams, including as low as 31% of capacity at the Sungai Selangor Dam, which supplies more than 60% of the state's water. These critically low reserve levels prompted water rationing affecting upwards of 6.7 million residents and lasting from March to May. As a result of reduced access to water for commercial use, at least 30 companies in the state, especially in the food and drinks processing, rubber, chemical, electrical and tourism industries, suffered losses greater than MYR1 million.

==== Long-Term ====
In the wake of sustained problems with water infrastructure and supply in Selangor, negotiations are underway to return the four private water concessionaires operating in Selangor to state control. Construction has been approved of the MYR993.89 million Langat 2 water treatment plant which was proposed to increase the state's output of treated water, alleviate pressure on other treatment plants, and provide an additional safety net in times of crisis.

== See also ==
- 1998 Klang Valley water crisis
- Water supply and sanitation in Malaysia
- Syarikat Bekalan Air Selangor
