= Water supply and sanitation in Malaysia =

Data
- Access to an improved water source: 100%
- Access to improved sanitation: 96%
- Average urban water use (L/person/day): 344 (total), 226 (residential)
- Average urban water and sanitation tariff (US$/m^{3}): 0.39 (2007)
- Share of household metering: 100%
- Share of self-financing by utilities: Low
- Share of tax-financing: High

Institutions
- Decentralization to municipalities: Partial (operation and maintenance at the state level)
- National water and sanitation company: Pengurusan Aset Air (Asset ownership for water), Indah Water Konsortium (Sanitation) - both only for peninsular Malaysia
- Water and sanitation regulator: National Water Services Commission (SPAN) - only for peninsular Malaysia
- Responsibility for policy setting: Ministry of Natural Resources, Environment and Climate Change
- Sector law: Water Services Industry Act 2006
- Service providers: 12 (water only)

Water supply and sanitation in Malaysia is characterised by numerous achievements, as well as some challenges. Universal access to water supply at affordable tariffs is a substantial achievement. The government has also shown a commitment to make the sector more efficient, to create a sustainable funding mechanism and to improve the customer orientation of service providers through sector reforms enacted in 2006. The reform creates a modern institutional structure for the water sector, including an autonomous regulatory agency, an asset management company and commercialised state water companies that have to reach certain key performance indicators that will be monitored by the regulatory agency. The government has also stated its intention not to embark on new private sector contracts for water provision, after a bout of such contracts during the 1990s showed mixed results.

A number of challenges remain, only some of which have been addressed by the reforms. First, tariffs are low, thus making cost recovery impossible at current levels so that the sector continues to depend on government subsidies. Second, water losses as well as per capita water use remain high despite efforts at water demand management. Third, a large-scale water transfer project from the Pahang River to Kuala Lumpur is controversial because of its negative social and environmental impacts. Fourth, the development of sewerage and wastewater treatment has lagged behind the development of water infrastructure. For example, much of the collected wastewater is not yet being treated. The sanitation sub-sector has been excluded in the 2006 reforms of the water supply sub-sector.

== Water resources and use ==
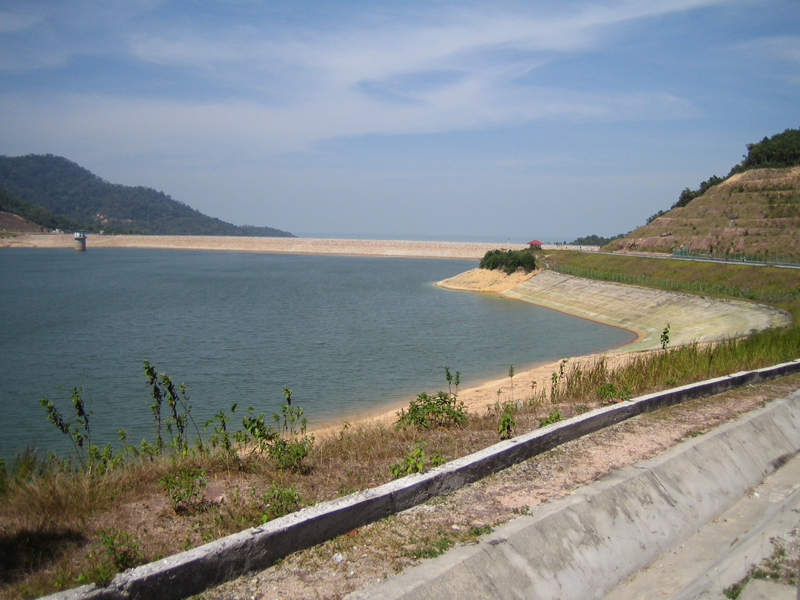
Surface water stored in reservoirs, such as this reservoir supplying Penang, are the most important source of drinking water supply in Malaysia

Water resources in Malaysia are abundant and available throughout the year. They are estimated at 580 km3/year (average 1977-2001), equivalent to more than 3,000 cubic meters per capita and year. In 1995, total water withdrawal was estimated at 12.5 km3, or less than 3 percent of available resources. 76 percent of water was used for agriculture, 11 percent for municipal water supply and 13 percent for industries. Thus only less than 1% of available water resources is used for drinking water supply.

Malaysia is geographically divided in Peninsular Malaysia and Eastern Malaysia. Peninsular Malaysia is drained by a dense network of rivers and streams, the longest being the Pahang River. Other major rivers in the peninsular Malaysia are the Kelantan River, Terengganu River, Dungun, Endau River, Sedili Besar River and Selangor River. The West Coast of Peninsular Malaysia is more urbanised and industrialised than the sparsely populated and water-rich East Coast.

Major rivers in Eastern Malaysia include Malaysia’s longest river, the Rajang River (563 km) in Sarawak.

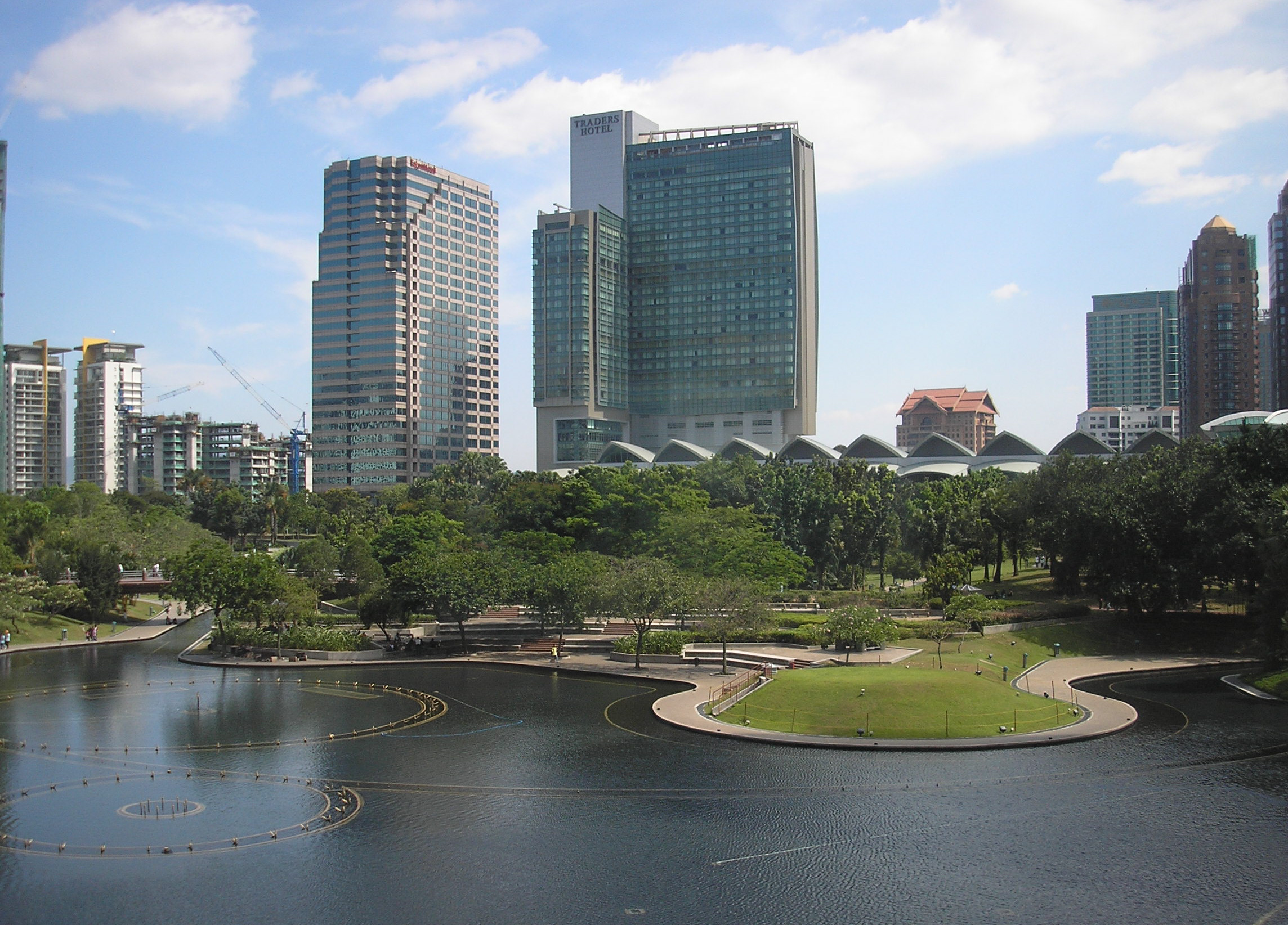
Kuala Lumpur's growing water needs require either better demand management or additional supplies

=== Kuala Lumpur and Selangor ===
The Malaysian capital Kuala Lumpur and Selangor state, which surrounds the capital, are the industrial heartland of the country and home to almost half its population. The constant growth of the metropolitan area increases its water needs. In 1998 the main sources of water supply for the area were the Ampang intake (18 megaliter per day) built in 1906, the Klang Gates Dam (28 megaliter per day) built in 1928, and the Semenyih Dam (545 megaliter per day) completed in 1984. In February 1998 a water crisis had occurred as water levels in all three reservoirs dropped simultaneously. Water rationing had to be introduced shortly before the Commonwealth Games were held in the city. The crisis was blamed on a drought induced by El Nino. However, actual rainfall in the preceding months had not been significantly below average (according to 1998 Klang Valley water crisis). The government used the crisis to justify plans to build a mega project, the Pahang-Selangor Raw Water Transfer Project. The project includes the construction of the Kelau dam on the Pahang river in the neighbouring state bearing the same name, as well as the transfer of water via a tunnel through a mountain range.

Only months after the 1998 Klang Valley water crisis, the Sungai Tinggi Dam had been completed with a capacity of 475 megaliters per day, thus increasing the supply to the Klang Valley by about 80%. The dam was part of the first phase of the Selangor River water supply project. The second phase of the project was completed in December 2000, providing another 475 megaliters per day. The third phase was completed in July 2005, providing an additional capacity of 1050 megaliters per day. The three phases of the project thus increased the water supply capacity in the Klang Valley by 1950 megaliters per day. It thus more than tripled the water supply capacity to the Klang Valley in only seven years. As of 2005, total water resources for the Kuala Lumpur and Selangor area were 2541 megaliter per day for 7.3 million inhabitants. This corresponds to 348 litre per capita and day, which is three times as high as, for example, per capita water use in Germany.

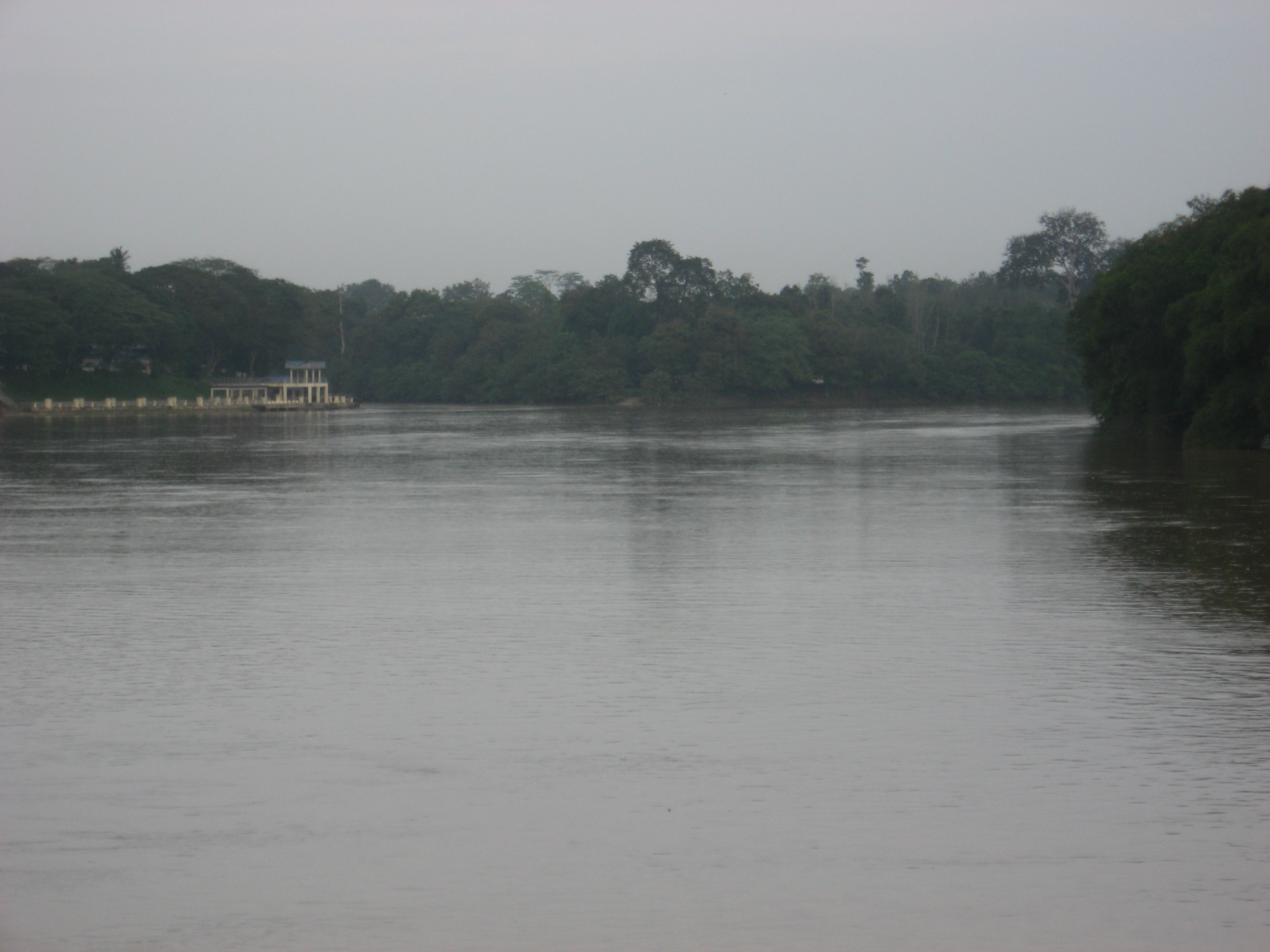
Water from the Pahang River is planned to be diverted to Kuala Lumpur to sastify the increasing water demands of the city and its fast-growing metropolitan area.

Nevertheless, the government states that the existing sources will meet supply only until 2007. Therefore, it continued to pursue the Pahang-Selangor Raw Water Transfer Project, which had received a boost from the 1998 Klang Valley water crisis. An environmental assessment for the project was completed in 1999. In 2005 the Japan Bank for International Cooperation (JBIC) signed an agreement to provide a soft loan with 40 year maturity for the construction of the dam. However, following international protests the building of the Kelau dam was on hold in 2010.

Critics argue that water demand management through the reduction of water losses and higher tariffs that would encourage water conservation can postpone the need for the transfer or even make it unnecessary. Water losses, or more precisely non-revenue water, were estimated at about 40% in 1997. Following a comprehensive loss reduction program initiated in 2000, physical water losses were reduced by 117,000 cubic meters per day until 2006 from half a million before the program. However, non-revenue water at SYABAS still stood at 35% in 2007, which remains higher than good practice for water utilities.

The dam is expected to have significant environmental impacts, including on biodiversity, and social impacts on the indigenous people, the Orang Asli, who would lose some of their ancestral land that would be inundated by the reservoir.

== Access ==
According to the UN’s Joint Monitoring Programme for Water Supply and Sanitation, which bases its estimates on national census and survey data, 100% of the population had access to an improve water source and 96% had access to improved sanitation in 2008, up from 88% and 84% respectively in 1990.

== History ==
=== Colonial history ===
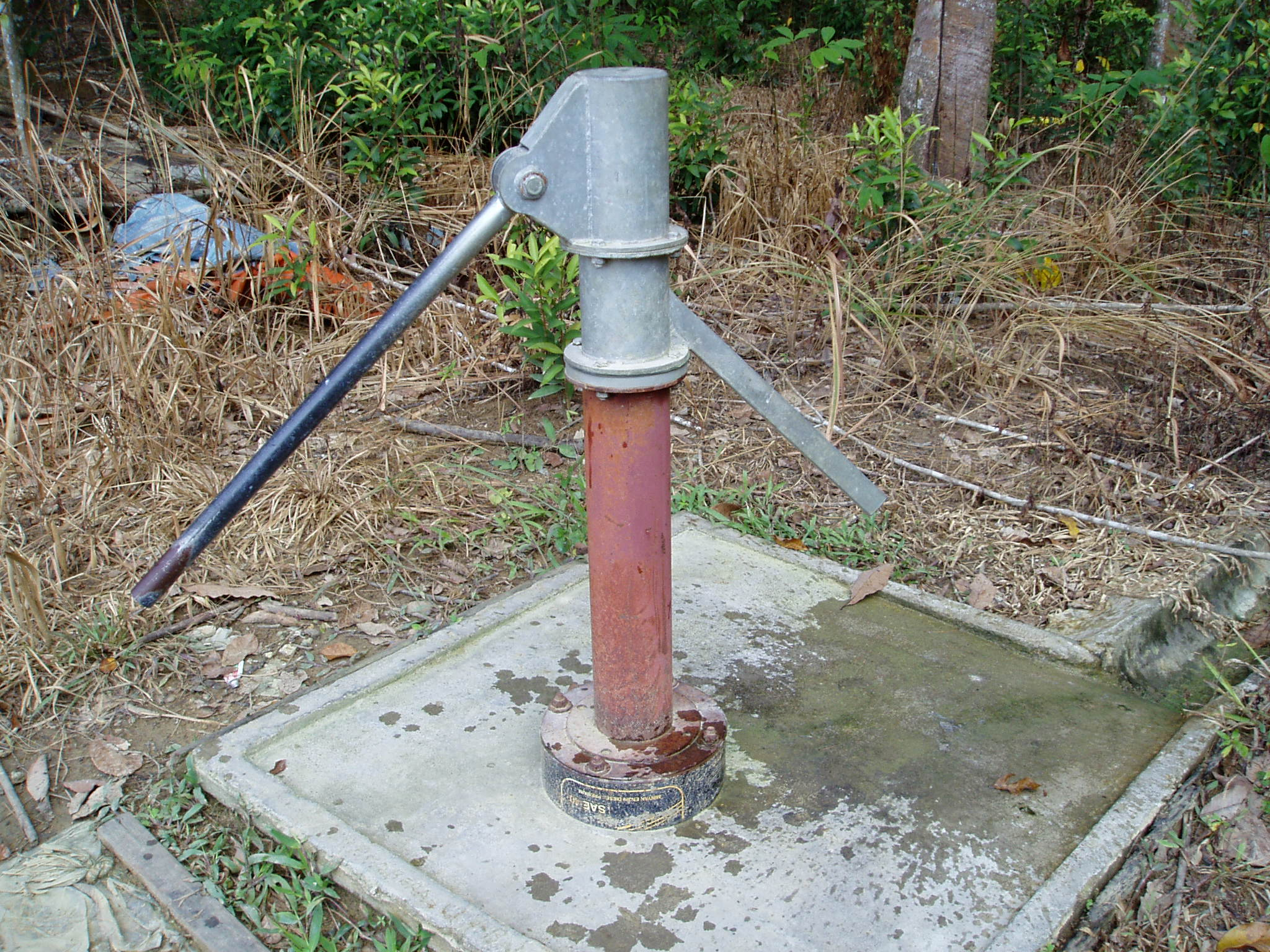
Stand pipes that were a common sight in rural areas have now been largely relegated to the past.

“Over the past 200 years, Malaysia has harnessed (its) abundant (water) resource for agriculture and water supply to industries and homes, where consumers have the convenience of running water at the turn of a tap. Wells have since been relegated to the annals of history and stand pipes where villagers washed, bathed and collected water for cooking and drinking are a rarity. Water delivery tankers, once not an uncommon sight, are now only contingency measures to tide over prolonged periods of drought.”

The foundation for piped water supply was laid by the British in 1804, when the first aqueduct of brick was built to transport water from the hills to the town of Penang. By the end of the 19th century piped water was available to urban households through house taps and stand pipes throughout the country. Piped water was still untreated, as it was common at the time throughout the world. In 1906 the first slow sand filter plant in Malaysia was built at the Ampang Intake for Kuala Lumpur. In 1934 the first rapid sand filter plant was built in Ayer Hitam in Penang. Both plants are still in service today. A report by the Public Works Department of Malaya at the time said: “Malaya had a water supply system and a standard of technical service second to none in the colonial Empire.”

=== Just before, and after independence ===
However, infrastructure was neglected during the Second World War and the subsequent insurgency. Because of this and due to rapid population growth, Kuala Lumpur suffered water shortages. To remedy the situation, the Klang Gates Dam and the Bukit Nanas Treatment Plant were commissioned, and the first phase was completed in 1957 ending a long period of water shortage and water rationing. Water development has since figured prominently in Malaysian Development Plans, focusing initially on urban areas. Beginning with the 3rd Malaysia Plan (1976-1980) rural water supply also received a much needed boost. The share of households in Peninsular Malaysia receiving treated water in both urban and rural areas rose from 23% in 1950 to 85% in 1990. The investments were partly financed with royalties from oil and gas revenues which soared after the 1973 oil price increase.

=== Water privatisation ===
Malaysia embarked on the privatisation of both water services and sanitation services during the 1990s, showing mixed results in both sub-sectors.

==== Water supply ====
In the early 1990s several states of Malaysia embarked on a policy of private sector participation in water and sanitation. A first Build-Operate-Transfer (BOT) contract was awarded in 1992 by Johor state for a water treatment plant for its capital. The bid was won by a consortium led by the Malaysian company Kembangan Dinamik with a minority share by the French firm SUEZ. More than a dozen other contracts followed in the 1990s in Sabah, Penang, Kuala Lumpur, Kedah, Kelantan and Negeri Sembilan. In 2002 the first state government in Malaysia fully privatised its water supply through an outright sale of assets for the entire network (divestiture).

==== Kuala Lumpur and Selangor ====
In the federal capital territory of Kuala Lumpur and the state of Selangor, which completely surrounds the capital territory, a 26-year BOT contract for a 1,120 megaliter per day water treatment plant was signed with Puncak Niaga Holdings in 1994 as part of the Selangor River Water Supply Scheme. The contract included a commitment to invest US$760m. The state government provided a revenue guarantee to make the project financially viable. In 2004 a 30-year concession was awarded without competitive bidding to Syarikat Bekalan Air Selangor Sdn Bhd (SYABAS), a subsidiary of Puncak Niaga Holdings. The concession foresaw investment commitments of US$2.5 billion. It was supported by fixed government payments, since tariffs were too low to make the concession financially viable. The concession contract was signed by the federal government as well as the state government of Selangor. Both contracts were listed as “distressed” in 2010 pending a request of cancellation, according to the World Bank’s Private Participation in Infrastructure database. According to the International Benchmarking Network for Water and Sanitation Utilities, the utility did not recover its operating costs in 2007. Its revenues were equivalent to US$0.45/m3 and its operating costs were US$0.55/m3. Syabas claims US$281 million in compensation because the government did not increase tariffs, as it was foreseen in the concession agreement. The government argues that the company has not met its performance targets and has not disclosed all the information it was obliged to disclose. The state of Selangor has offered to buy back all water concessions in the state. After lengthy discussions about the price and after intervention by the federal government, three of four concessions in the State of Selangor (Syabas as well as PNSB, both owned by Puncak Niaga Holdings, and the smaller state-owned ABASS) were bought back in September 2014 for a price of reportedly €1.9 billion. Services will now be provided by Syarikat Air Selangor, the new state company to treat and distribute most of Selangor’s water, while assets will be owned by the Water Asset Management Company (WAMCO).

==== Sanitation ====
Since investments in sewerage did not keep pace with investments in water supply, the responsibility for sewerage in much of peninsular Malaysia was transferred from local governments to Indah Water Konsortium (IWK) in 1994. IWK was a private company owned by Prime Utilities (70%) and Idris Hydraulic (30%). The contract was awarded by the federal government without competitive bidding. It covered the Indah Region (Kuala Lumpur, Penang, Labuan and Langkawi). In 2000 the concession was cancelled and the federal government took over the ownership of the company.

=== Sector reform ===
Since independence investment in water supply had been a responsibility of the 13 states of Malaysia, with no significant role for the federal government. Although Malaysia is de iure a federal state, de facto most states depend on fiscal transfers from the federal government. Therefore, the country is often considered a de facto unitary state (see Federalism in Malaysia). The federal government thus always played a role in the water sector, although water services were legally an exclusive responsibility of the states.

Faced with an RM8 billions (US$2.2 billions) debt by utilities, poor efficiency and poor cost recovery due to low tariffs, in 2003 the federal government decided to embark on a sector reform. The objective was to make the sector more efficient, to create a sustainable funding mechanism and to improve the customer orientation of service provision. Also, the role of the federal government was strengthened vis a vis the state governments through the reform. A key step of the reform was a constitutional amendment approved in January 2005. Through it water services became a shared responsibility between the States and the Federal Government. Two key laws that enshrined the reform were passed in 2006. The National Water Services Commission, the national regulatory agency for the sector, began its work in January 2008 when the new laws became effective. The reform only applies to peninsular Malaysia.

The government has also declared that no more water services concessions will be awarded. Existing concessionaires that choose to remain with their concession agreements are allowed to operate until the end of their concessions. State water companies now require an operating license and are gradually being corporatised.

== Stakeholders ==
=== Policy and regulation ===
The legal framework for the water and sanitation sector differs between peninsular Malaysia (with its 11 federal states and two federal territories) on the one hand and Eastern Malaysia (with the federal states Sabah and Sarawak and one federal territory) on the other hand. While a water reform was enacted for peninsular Malaysia in 2006, the previous legal and institutional framework was maintained in Eastern Malaysia.

Two main laws passed in 2006 form the legal framework of the water and sanitation sector in peninsular Malaysia. The Water Services Industry Act (WSIA) established a national Water Asset Management Company (WAMCO), called PAAB in Malaysian, and a Water Forum to give voice to hitherto under-represented stakeholders such as consumers. The National Water Services Commission Act established a National Water Services Commission known under its Malay acronym as SPAN. The acts separated the functions of policy making (government), regulation (SPAN), asset ownership (PAAB) and service provision (state water companies) from each other. The laws were enacted after extensive public consultations over two years. As part of the reform process, for the first time in Malaysian history a draft bill had been made available for public discussion before it was presented to Parliament.

SPAN now issues licenses for water operators, mainly state water companies. These licenses can theoretically be revoked if key performance indicators are not met or other standards are not respected. The standards are set and monitored by SPAN.

In Eastern Malaysia water supply remains a responsibility of state governments and sanitation a responsibility of local governments.

Within the executive branch of the federal government, the Ministry of Energy, Green Technology and Water is in charge of setting water supply and sanitation policies. It is assisted by two technical agencies under its supervision: The water supply department (JBA) and the sewerage services department (JPP). The latter was established through the Sewerage Services Act of 1994 as a regulatory agency for the private sanitation company IWK. When IWK was taken over by the government in 2000, the sewerage services department became responsible for the development of infrastructure while IWK remained in charge of operation and maintenance as a publicly owned company. The regulatory functions of JPP ceased in 2007.

A Water Forum, established by law, is tasked with protecting consumers’ interests.

=== Service provision ===
Service provision is clearly separated between water supply on the one hand and sanitation on the other hand. Since the 2006 reforms all water supply assets in peninsular Malaysia are owned by the Water Asset Management Company (WAMCO), called Pengurusan Aset Air Berhad (PAAB) in Malaysian. They are then leased back to public operators (mostly State Water Companies) as well as private operators. All operators have to be licensed by the regulatory agency SPAN and have to achieve certain performance indicators specified in the licenses.

Sanitation (sewerage and wastewater treatment) is organised differently. The largest wastewater operator is Indah Water Konsortium Malaysia (IWK) that handles sewerage and wastewater treatment all over peninsular Malaysia, except for the State of Kelantan and the capital of Johor state. Assets, however, are owned by the 151 local authorities of Malaysia. Where IWK does not operate the sanitation infrastructure, local authorities provide this service directly.

=== Private operators ===
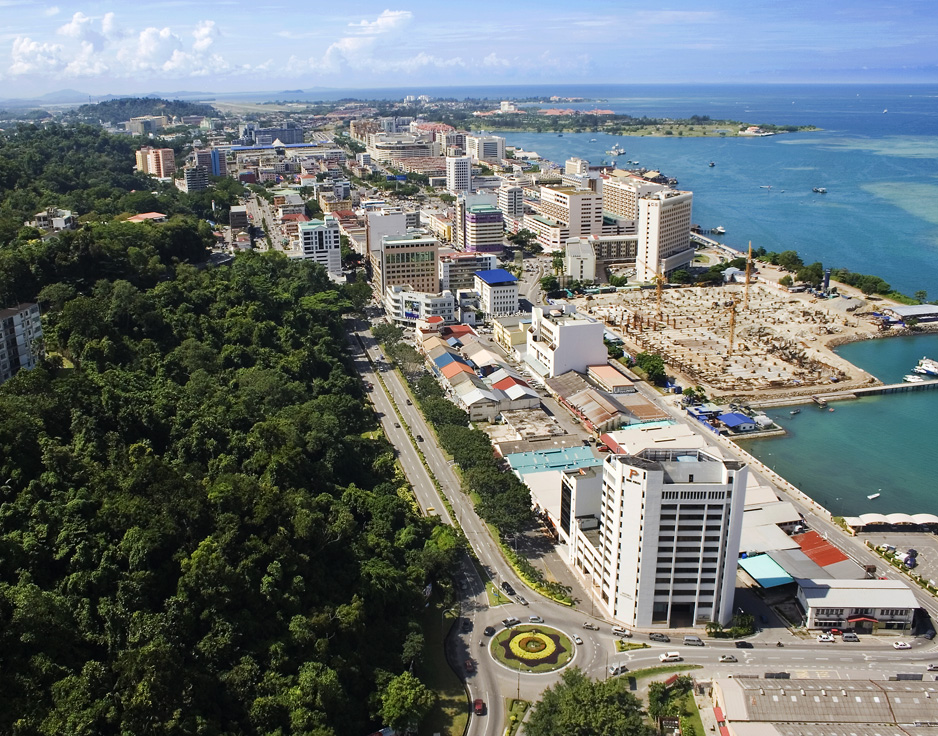
Kota Kinabalu, the capital of Sabah state, is one of many cities in Malaysia that receives its drinking water through infrastructure plant that was financed and is being operated by private companies.

Some private operators hold concessions for water treatment plants. They are usually not directly in touch with customers, but they sell treated water in bulk to water distribution companies. The World Bank’s Private Participation in Infrastructure database showed 14 private water contracts in Malaysia as of 2010, out of which 8 were operational and 6 were “distressed” and had a request for contract termination. The 8 operational projects are the following:

- The Johor Bahru Water Treatment Plant, a 20-year BOT for the capital of Johor state signed in 1992 with a US$284m investment commitment
- The Kota Kinabalu Water Supply Project, a 20-year BOT from a water treatment plant in Sabah state signed in 1993 with a US$141m investment commitment
- The Sandakan and Tawau Water Supply Project, a 20-year BOT in Sabah state signed in 1993 with a US$86m investment commitment
- The Southern Water Corporation Johor Concession covering the districts Muar, Batu Pahat, Segamat and Kluang in Johor state, a BOT for a water treatment plant signed in 1994 with a US$423m investment commitment
- The Langkawi Water Project covering the group of islands of the same name in Pengan state under a 25-year management contract signed in 1996
- The Johor Water Supply, a 30-year BOT for the Semangar Water Treatment Plant signed in 2000 with a US$3.4bn investment commitment
- The Kuala Jelai Phase I and Phase II Water Treatment Plants in Negeri Sembilan, a management contract signed in 2003
- Perbadanan Bekalan Air Pulau Pinang Sdn Bhd (PBAPP), a private company supplying the entire state of Penang on a permanent basis with water.

Some of these contracts were awarded after competitive bidding, such as the Johor Bahru water treatment plant, while others were awarded after direct negotiations, such as the Semangar water treatment plant.

In Penang state water is supplied by Perbadanan Bekalan Air Pulau Pinang Sdn Bhd (PBAPP), a 100% subsidiary of PBA Holdings Bhd, a company traded on the stock exchange. It has been described by a Malaysian NGO as a success story of water privatisation.

== Financial aspects ==
=== Financing ===
Prior to the 2006 reform the federal Government provided loans to state governments for the development of water infrastructure. State governments provided their own funding as well. Malaysia has a vibrant oil and gas industry. The national oil company Petronas provided 44% of federal government revenue in 2008, as well as a substantial share of revenues of some states. These revenues have allowed the country to keep water tariffs low through subsidies, while providing almost universal access to water supply and sanitation. Private concessions are funded predominantly by debt raised at market rates. The cost is passed on to taxpayers that have to shoulder the debt, or to consumers that have to face higher water tariffs.

Through the 2006 reform the responsibility to finance and develop new water infrastructure in peninsular Malaysia has been transferred to the asset management company PAAB. PAAB is financed through an initial equity contribution from the federal government and lease payments that it is due to receive from state water companies. PAAB is in the process of taking over both assets and debt from the state water companies. It is expected to contract debt at commercial rates in the capital market, obtaining favourable rates thanks to guarantees by the federal government. Water infrastructure development in Sabah and Sarawak continues to be financed directly by the federal and state governments.

The Federal Government allocated RM4 billion (US$1.1bn) for water supply projects under the 8th Malaysia Plan (2001-2005). This is almost double the allocation under the 7th Malaysia Plan. The 8th Malaysia Plan also recommends Water Demand Management as a tool to ‘stretch’ existing supplies and delay the development of large capital-intensive projects.

=== Tariffs and cost recovery ===
In the long run, the Federal Government wants the state operators to achieve full cost recovery and attain financial independence. However, this target is still far from being achieved. In 2009 the average domestic water tariff in Malaysia was Ringgit (MYR) 0.65/m3 (US$0.18/m3). There are 14 different regional water tariffs in Malaysia, each corresponding roughly to one state. The lowest domestic tariff is in Penang (MYR0.31/m3), while the highest is in Johor (MYR0.98/m3). The average industrial water tariff in 2009 was MYR1.32/m3 (US$0.37/m3). Domestic water tariffs are thus only a fraction of domestic water tariffs in neighbouring Singapore (US$1.62/m3) or in Jakarta, Indonesia (US$0.77/m3). Nevertheless, according to the International Benchmarking Network for Water Supply and Sanitation Utilities, Malaysian utilities managed to recover, on average, 115% of their operating costs in 2007. But it has to be kept in mind that operating costs are kept low through various subsidies. The full costs of service provision - operating costs plus capital costs - are not covered through revenues.

Despite these low tariffs, some states have further reduced water tariffs. Following an election promise, beginning in 2008 Selangor state is subsidising its consumers with RM132 million/year (about US$40m) as a result of giving “free water” (first 20 m3) to about 1.5 million households. The President of Water Watch Penang, Prof. Dr. Chan Ngai Weng has called for the removal of water subsidies to encourage water conservation. In 2009, the Penang State Government subsidised domestic consumers with RM43 million (about US$12m). The Penang State Government is reluctant to review its low water tariffs, despite the fact that market survey studies conducted by the state water utility and the NGO Water Watch Penang indicate that the majority of water consumers are willing to pay for a "reasonable" tariff increase as long as the service is maintained at a high standard. Although water supply in Penang state is privatised, tariffs are the lowest in Malaysia due to the subsidies. Residential water bills are in the order of RM 2.5 per month. Even with the lowest tariffs in the nation, the Non-Revenue Water (NRW) in Penang was the lowest in the nation at 18.4% in 2010.
