= Gombak River =

River in Kuala Lumpur and Selangor, Malaysia

Coordinates: 3°08′53″N 101°41′43″E

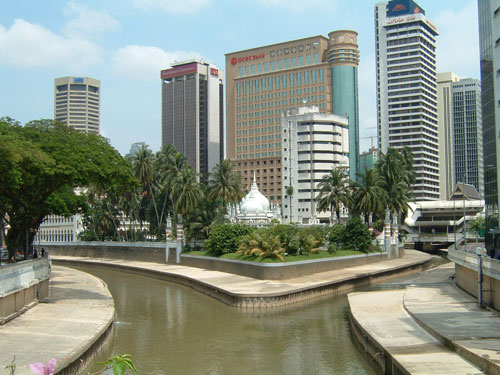
- The Gombak River (left) merges with the Klang River (right) in Kuala Lumpur.
- Native name: Sungai Gombak (Malay)

Location
- Country: Malaysia
- States: Selangor and Kuala Lumpur

Physical characteristics
- Source
  - location: Gunung Bunga Buah
- Mouth
  - location: Confluence with the Klang River at Masjid Jamek, Kuala Lumpur
- Length: 27 km (17 mi)
- Basin size: 122 km^{2} (47 sq mi)

The Gombak River (Malay: Sungai Gombak) is a river which flows through Selangor and Kuala Lumpur in Malaysia. It is a tributary of the Klang River. The confluence where it meets the Klang River is the origin of Kuala Lumpur's name.

Gombak River used to be called the Sungai Lumpur. Kuala Lumpur's name was taken as it was located in Sungai Lumpur's confluence or "Kuala Lumpur".

== History ==
Malay settlements existed near the Gombak-Klang river confluence since the early 1850s. The river banks were used for growing food and collecting jungle produce. The rivers were used for communication and transportation for the villagers.

== Towns along the river basin ==
- Gombak
- Setapak
- Padang Balang
- Batu
- Taman Melawati, Kuala Lumpur
- Wangsa Maju
- Sentul
- Titiwangsa
- Downtown Kuala Lumpur
  - PWTC
  - Bandaraya
  - Jalan Kuching
  - Jalan TAR
  - Masjid Jamek

== See also ==
- List of rivers of Malaysia
