= Sultan Iskandar Reservoir =

Sultan Iskandar Reservoir Takungan Air Sultan Iskandar
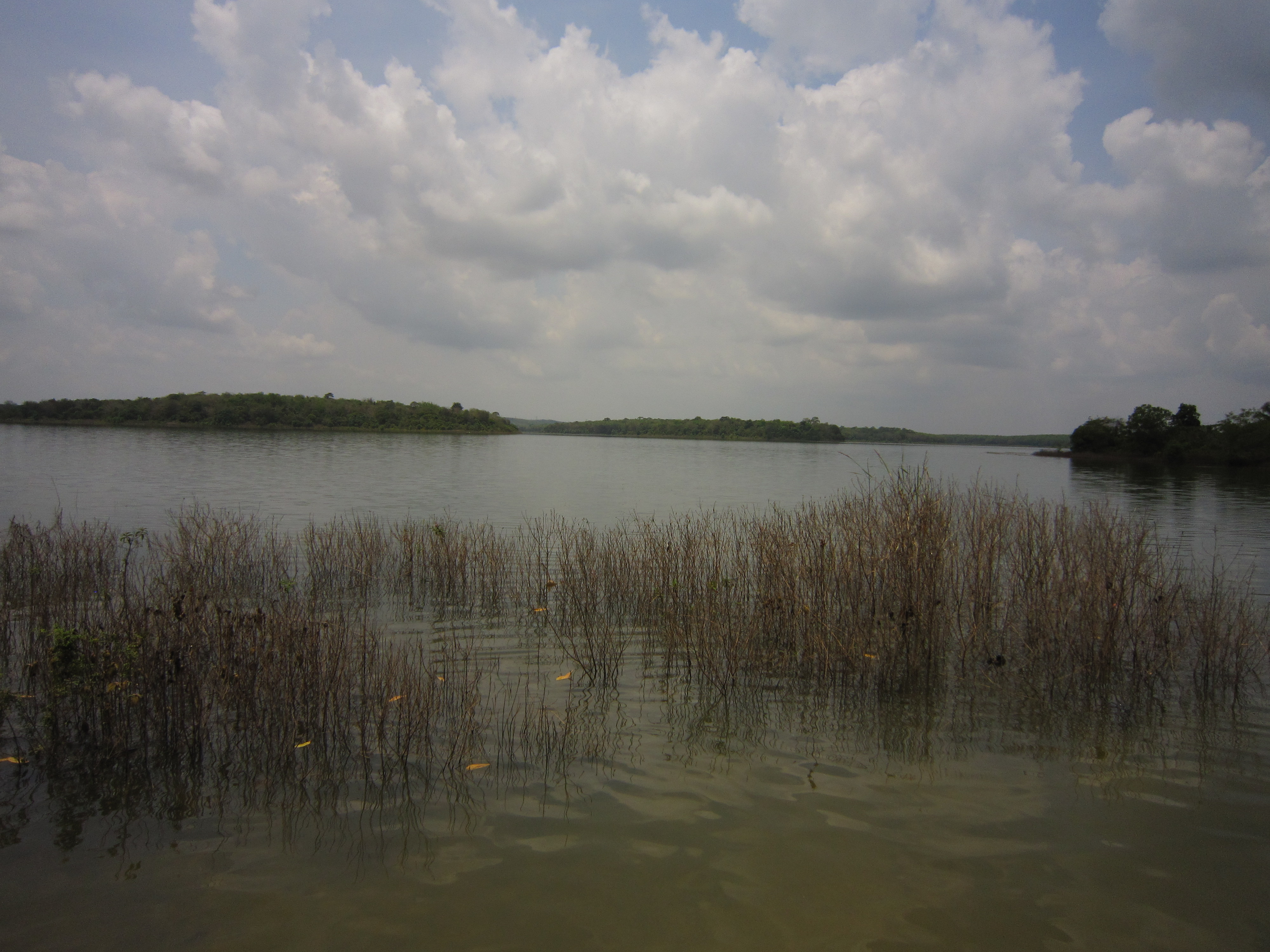
- Interactive map of Sultan Iskandar Reservoir; Takungan Air Sultan Iskandar
- Location: Johor Bahru, Johor, Malaysia
- Coordinates: 01°33′22″N 103°54′37″E

The Sultan Iskandar Reservoir (Malay: Takungan Air Sultan Iskandar or Empangan Sultan Iskandar) is an artificial lake in Johor Bahru, Johor, Malaysia. The reservoir is about 5 km long and 2.5 km at its widest and strongly branches out. It is fed by several small rivers, which flow in long branches, and drained over the Layang River in the Johor River. It was named after the late Sultan of Johor, Almarhum Sultan Iskandar.

== See also ==
- Water supply and sanitation in Malaysia
