= Sungai Jernih MRT station =

MRT station in Kuala Lumpur, Malaysia

KG33 Sungai Jernih
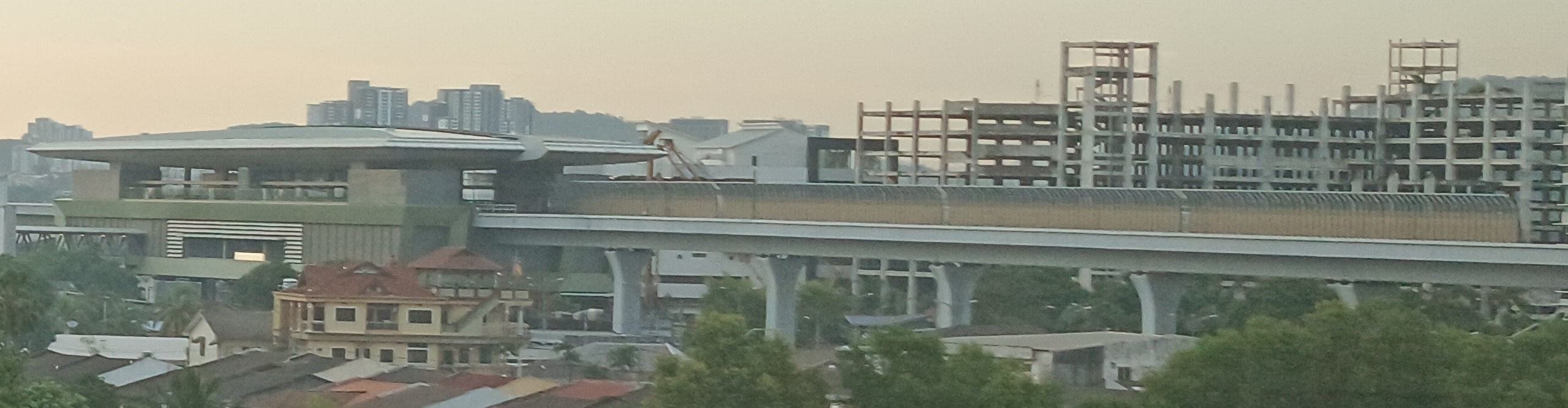
- Bird-eye view of the station.

General information
- Other names: Malay: سوڠاي جرنيه (Jawi); Chinese: 双溪遮内; Tamil: சுங்கை ஜெர்னே
- Location: Jalan Cheras, Sungai Jernih, 43000 Kajang; Selangor; Malaysia
- Coordinates: 3°00′02.7″N 101°47′02.69″E
- System: Rapid KL
- Owner: MRT Corp
- Operator: Rapid Rail
- Line: 9 Kajang Line
- Platforms: 2 side platforms
- Tracks: 2

Construction
- Structure type: Elevated
- Parking: Available with payment. 508 total parking bays; 49 motorcycle bays.
- Cycle facilities: Available. 10 bicycle bays.
- Accessible: Yes

Other information
- Station code: KG33

History
- Opened: 17 July 2017; 9 years ago
- Former names: Saujana Impian, Sungai Kantan

Services
Preceding station		Following station
Bukit Dukung towards Kwasa Damansara	Kajang Line	Stadium Kajang towards Kajang
Location

The Sungai Jernih MRT station is an elevated mass rapid transit (MRT) station on the MRT Kajang Line, located in the northern precincts of downtown Kajang, Selangor, Malaysia. It was opened on 17 July 2017, along with 19 adjoining stations (from Muzium Negara to Kajang) as part of Phase 2 of the system.

The station stands at the northern gateway to Kajang town, along Jalan Cheras (which is part of the Malaysia Federal Route 1) and just south of the southern end of the Cheras-Kajang Expressway (CKE). The Lotus's Kajang branch, as well as the KPJ Kajang Specialist Hospital and the Hulu Langat district education department, are located in the vicinity.

During construction, the station was first provisionally named Saujana Impian, then Sungai Kantan, after the nearby housing project of Saujana Impian and the Kampung Sungai Kantan village. This is one of two stations serving Kajang's town centre, the other being Stadium Kajang.

== Station Background ==
=== Station Layout ===
The station has a layout and design similar to that of most other elevated stations on the line (except the terminal stations), with the platform level on the topmost floor, consisting of two sheltered side platforms along a double-tracked line and a single concourse housing ticketing facilities between the ground level and the platform level. All levels are linked by lifts, stairways and escalators.

L2	Platform Level	Side platform
L2	Platform Level	Platform 1:	9 Kajang Line towards KG35 Kajang (→)
L2	Platform Level	Platform 2	9 Kajang Line towards KG04 Kwasa Damansara (←)
L2	Platform Level	Side platform
L1	Concourse	Facilities (Toilets and Surau), Faregates, Ticketing Machines, Customer Service Office, Station Control, Shops, towards entrances A and B, park & ride walkway
G	Ground Level	Entrances A (to Jalan Cheras/Kuala Lumpur) and B (to KPJ Kajang Hospital/Kajang city), Feeder bus hub, Taxi and e-hailing vehicle lay-by, Jalan Cheras, KPJ Kajang Specialist Hospital

=== Exits and entrances ===
The station has two entrances, each on either side of Jalan Cheras. There is also a direct elevated walkway to the multi-storey park and ride facility located next to the station.

Kajang Line station
Entrance	Location	Destination	Picture
A	West side of Jalan Cheras	Kampung Sungai Jernih, bus stop (Kuala Lumpur-bound)	
B	East side of Jalan Cheras	Feeder bus station, multi-storey park and ride, bus stop (Kajang-bound) KPJ Kajang Specialist Hospital, Lotus's Kajang, Kampung Sungai Kantan	
Park & Ride Walkway		Multi-storey park and ride	

== Bus Services ==
=== MRT Feeder Bus Services ===
With the opening of the MRT Kajang Line, feeder bus service also began operating, linking the station with the Saujana Impian area. The feeder bus operates from the station's feeder bus at Entrance B of the station. However, this bus service was discontinued on 16 January 2026 and replaced with the Rapid on-Demand DRT service. Low ridership was cited as the reason for its termination.

Route No.	Origin	Destination	Via	Terminated
T456	KG33 Sungai Jernih	Saujana Impian	Lotus's Kajang; Persiaran Saujana Impian; Persiaran Impian Perdana	16 January 2026

=== Other Bus Services ===
The MRT is served by some other bus services.

Route No.	Operator	Origin	Destination	Via	Notes
450	Rapid KL	Hentian Kajang	Hub Lebuh Pudu	Reko Sentral; Bandar Kajang; KG34 Stadium Kajang; KG33 Sungai Jernih; Sungai Sekamat; Simpang Balak; KG31 Bukit Dukung; Cheras–Kajang Expressway; Batu 9 Cheras / Taman Suntex; Cheras Sentral / KG26 Taman Connaught; FT 1 Cheras Highway (Jalan Cheras); KG24 Taman Midah; AG13 KG22 Maluri; Jalan Cheras; Jalan Pasar; Jalan Pudu	The station entrance is within walking distance of the bus stop. (For both KL and Kajang-bound)

== Gallery ==
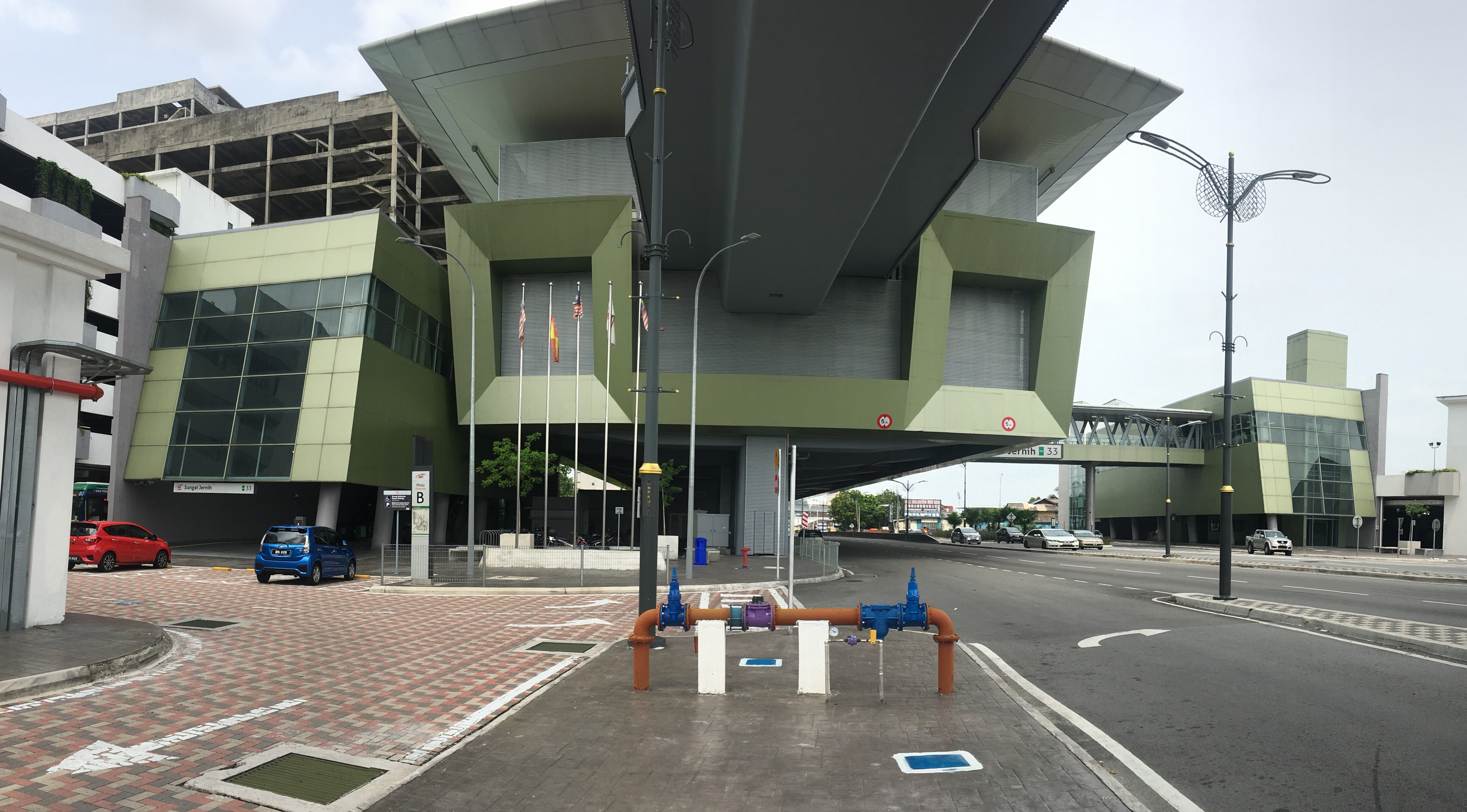
View of the station above Jalan Cheras with Entrance A on the right and Entrance B on the left.

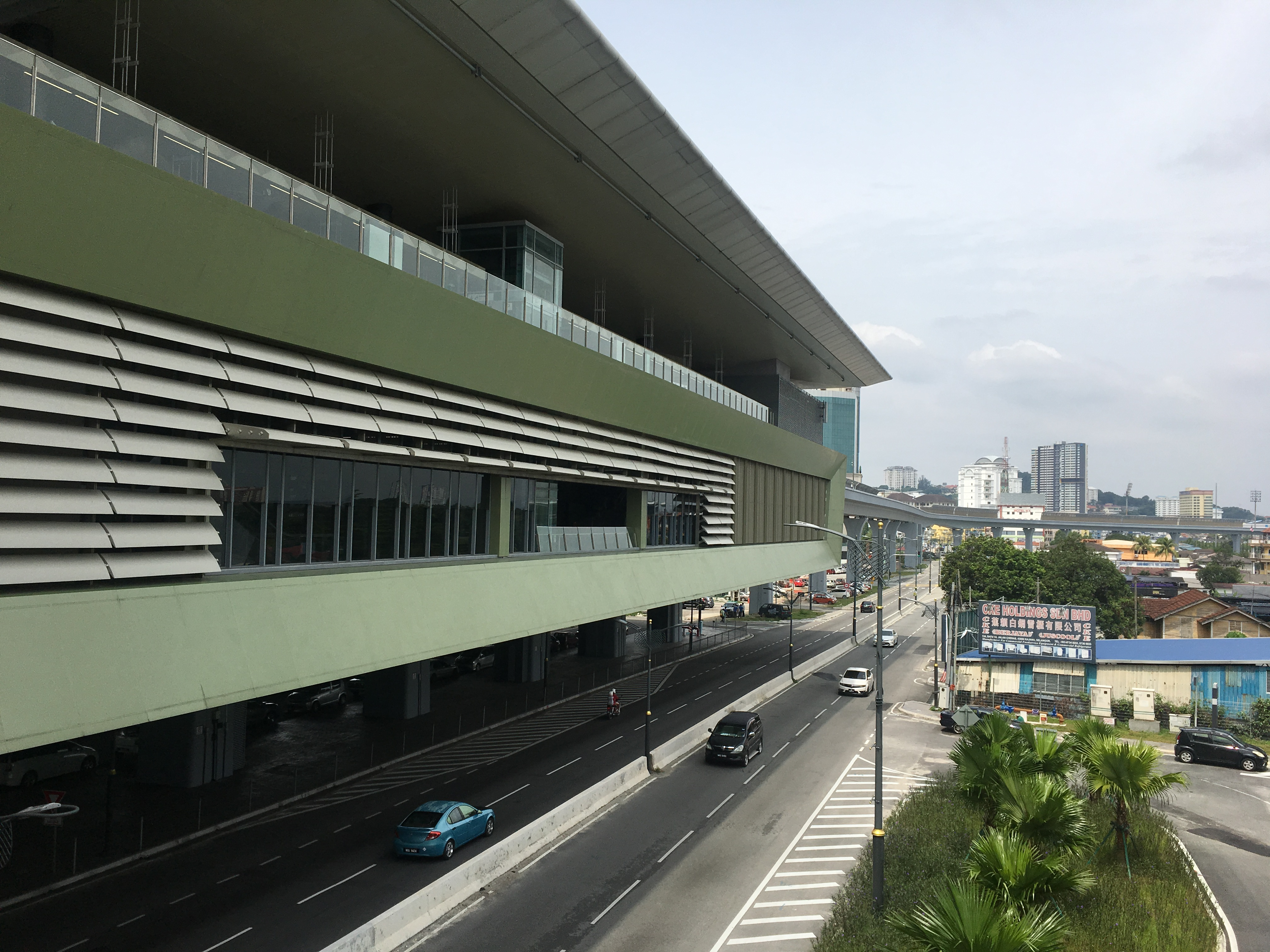
Station above Jalan Cheras, looking to the south towards Kajang town.

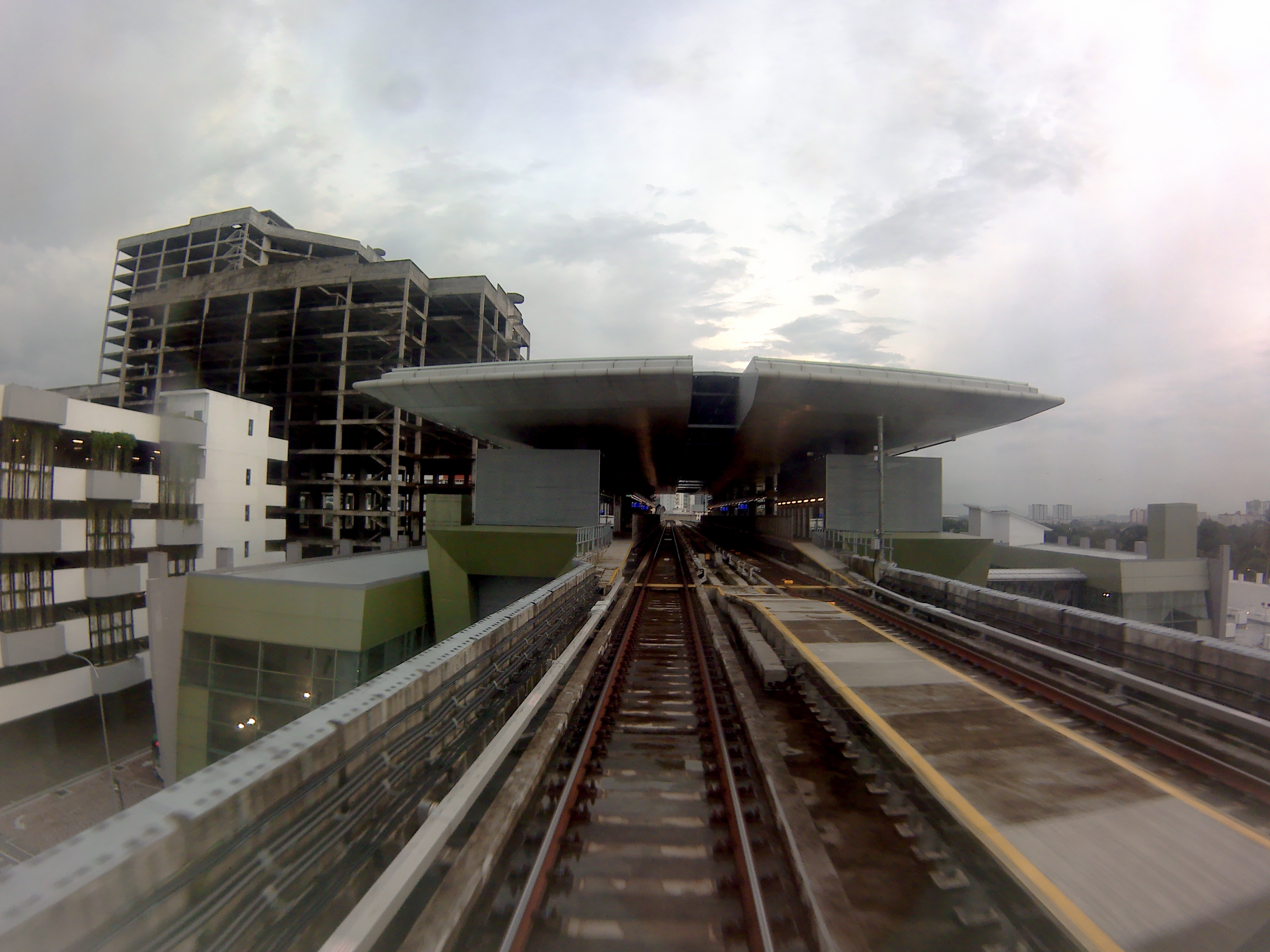
Overall view of the station.

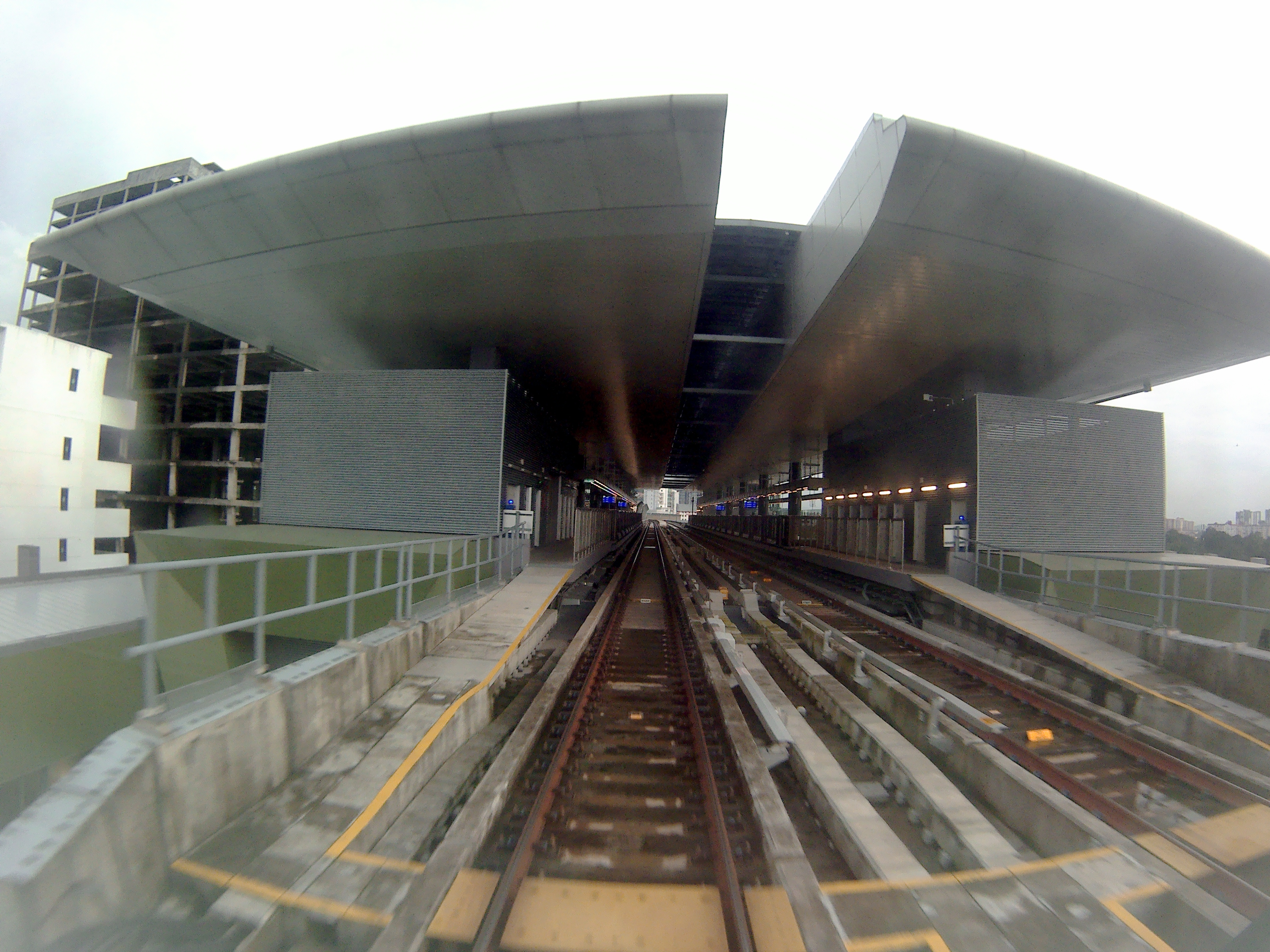
Another overall view of the station.

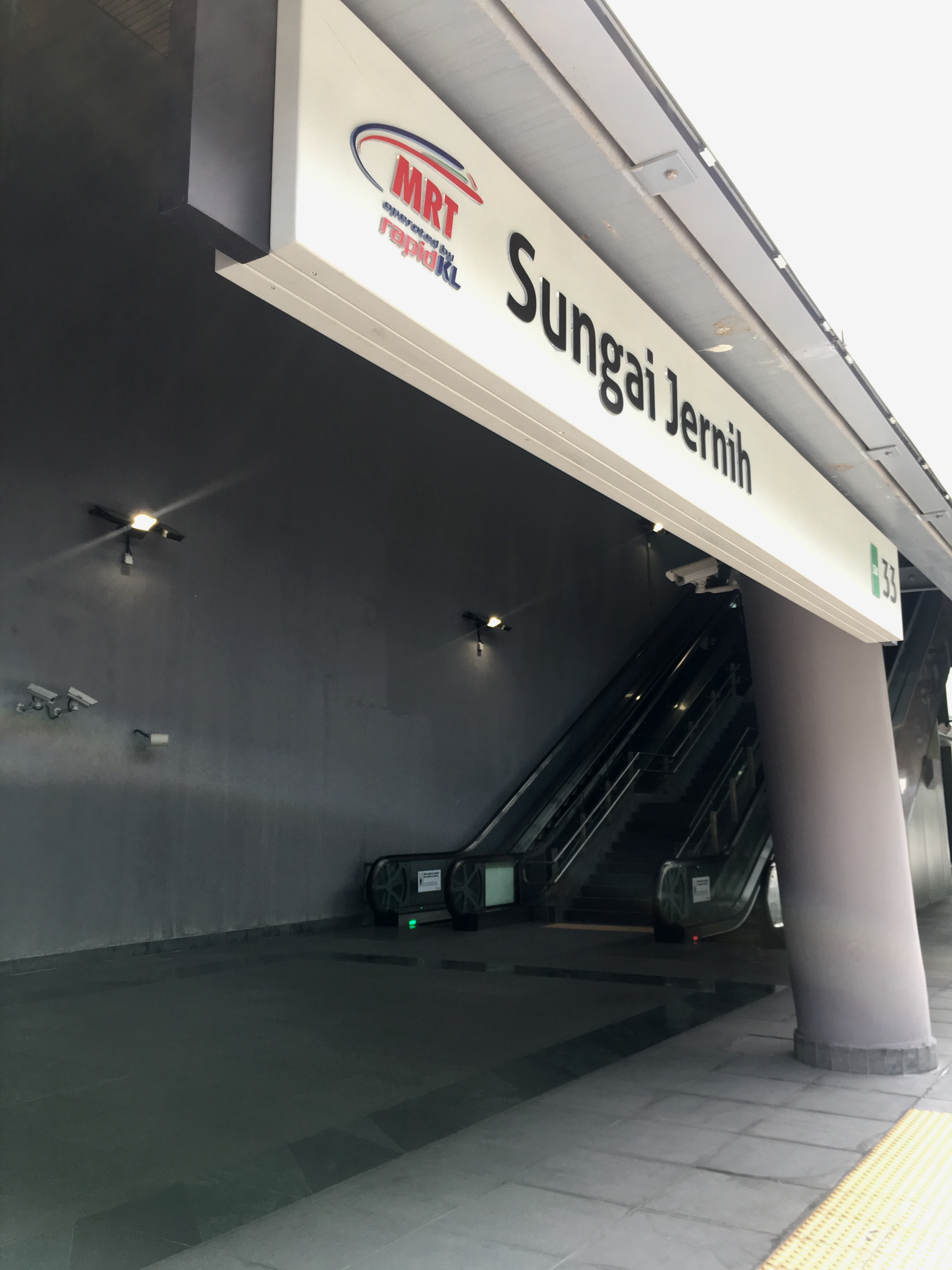
Entrance A of the station.

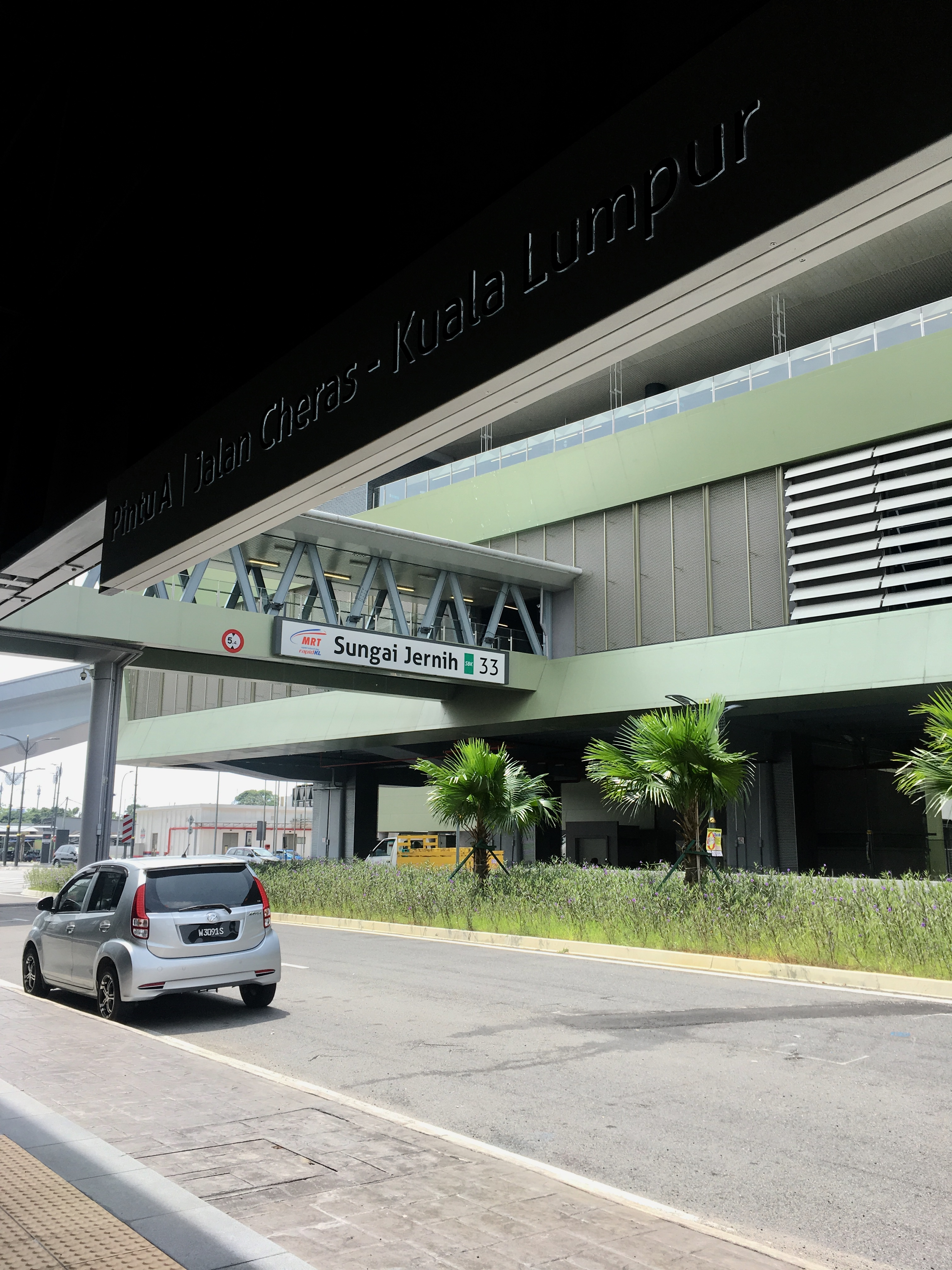
Entrance A of the station.

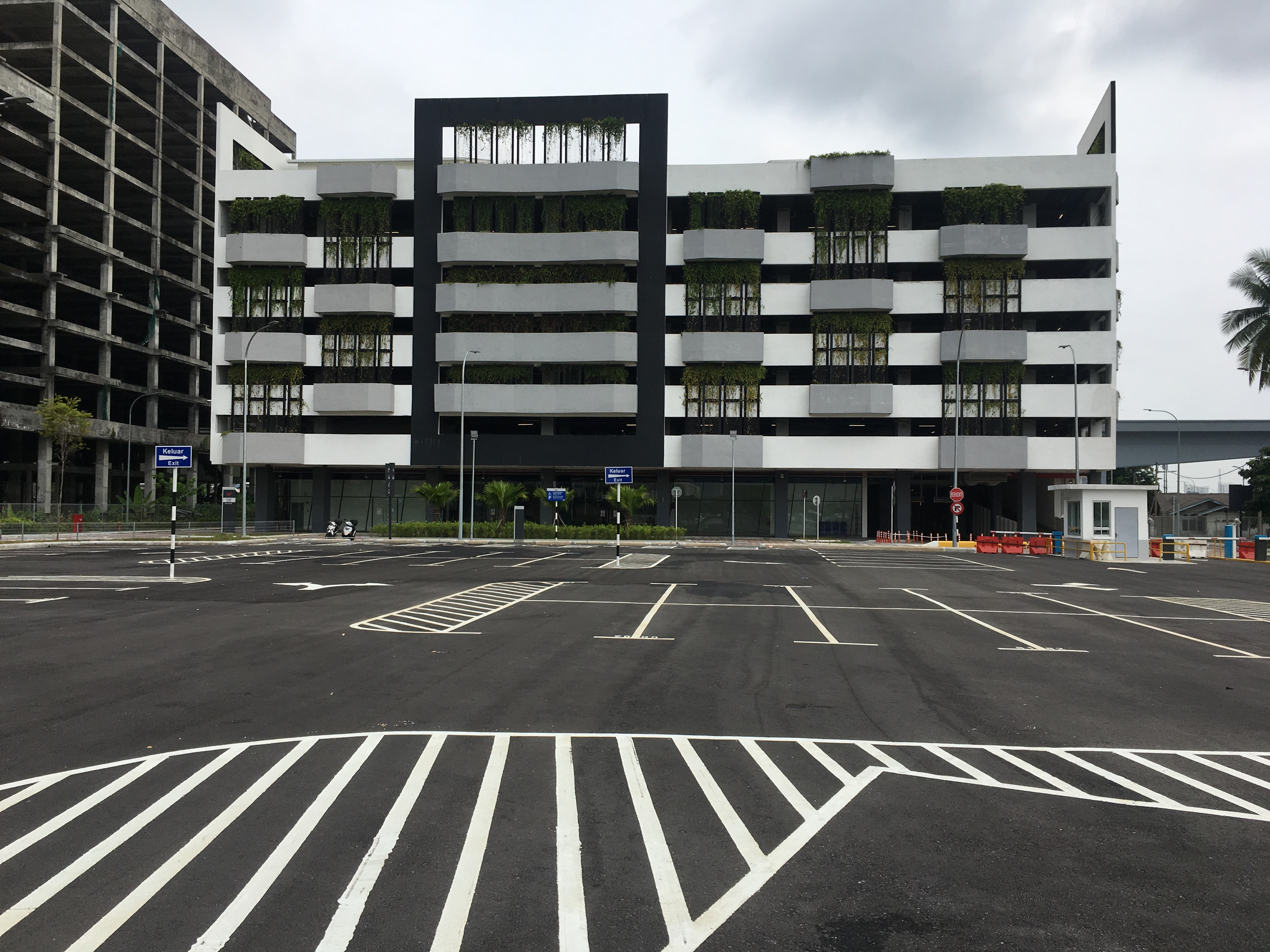
Multi-storey park and ride building next to the station.

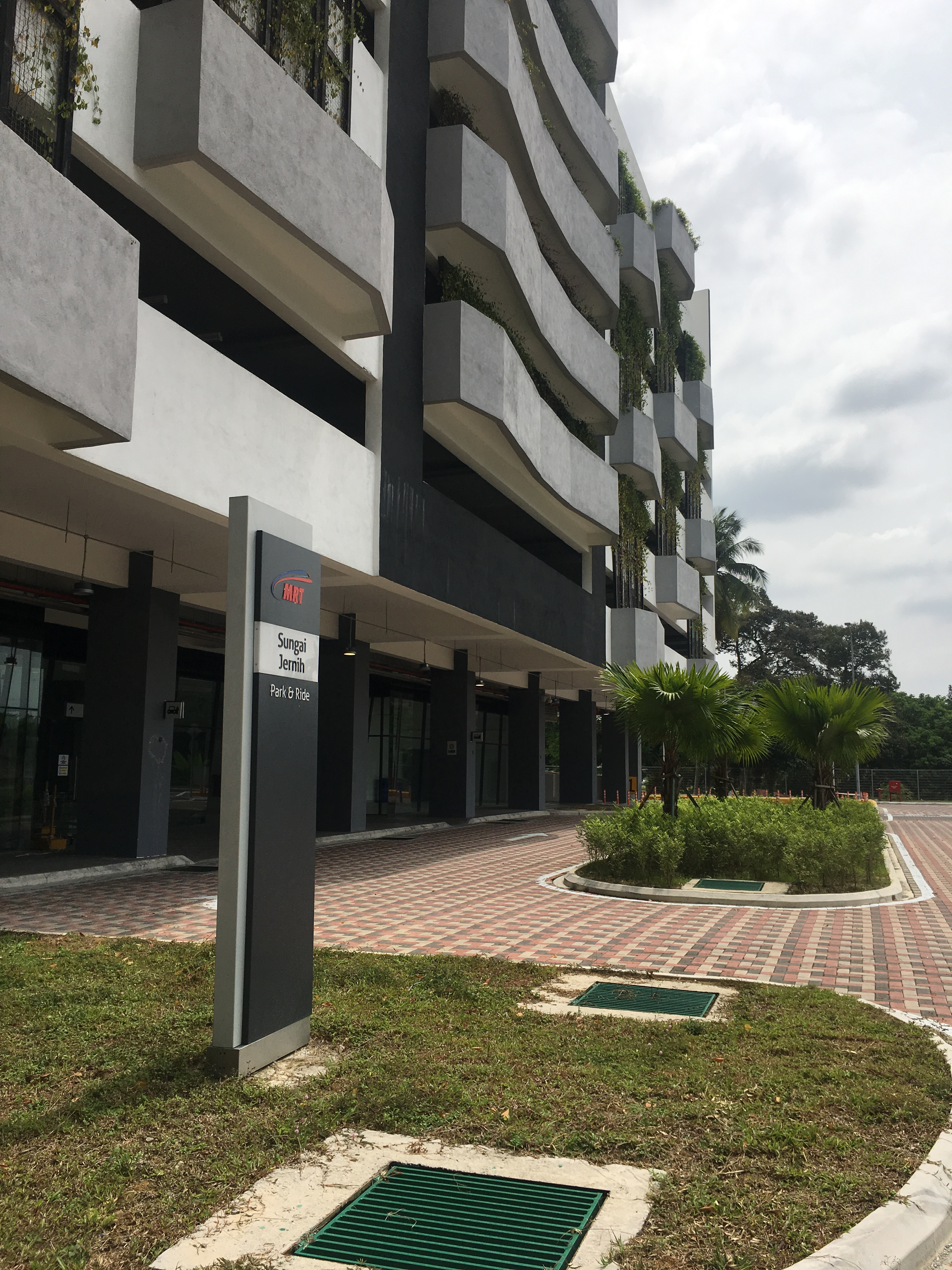
Multi-storey park and ride building next to the station.

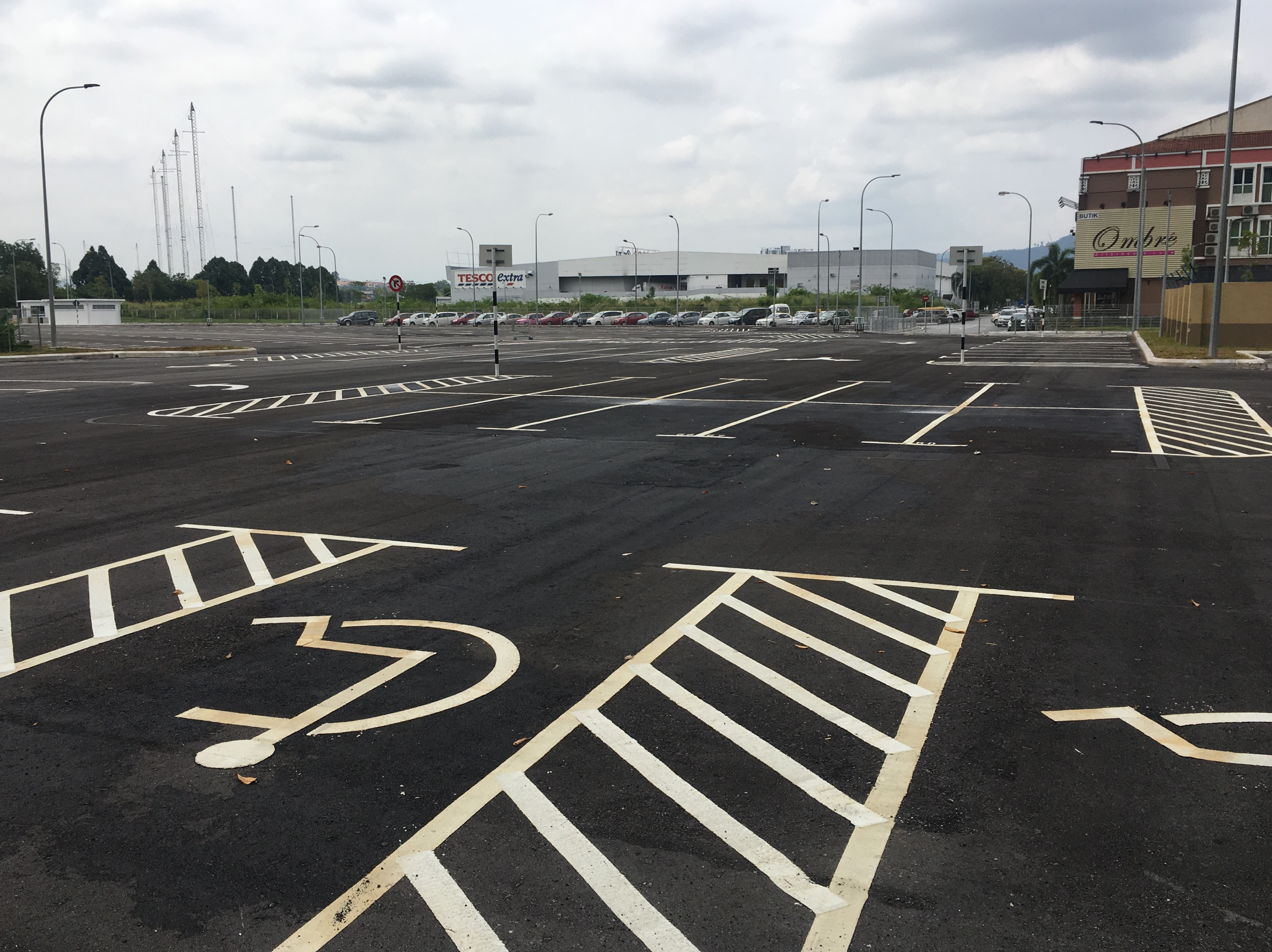
New additional park and ride bays being made available at the station.

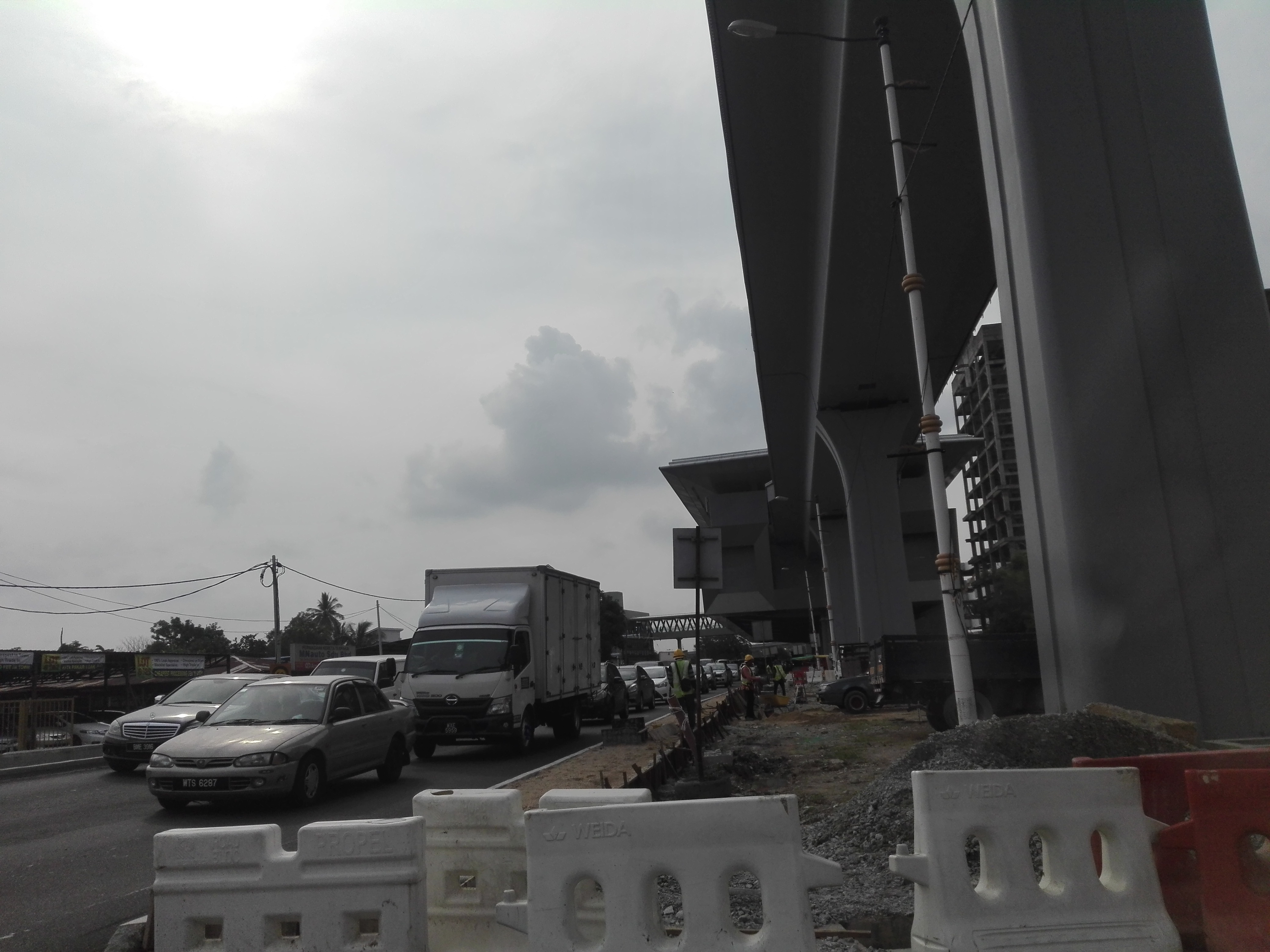
The station under construction 2 months before the completion date.
