= List of dams in Malaysia =

Following is the list of dams in Malaysia:

== Johor ==
Bekok Dam - Juaseh Dam - Linggiu Dam - Machap Dam - Semberong Dam - Layang Dam - Lebam Dam - Labong Dam - Sultan Iskandar Reservoir

== Kedah ==
Beris Dam - Pedu Dam - Muda Dam - Ahning Dam

== Kelantan ==
Pergau Dam - Nenggiri Hydroelectric Dam (under construction)

== Kuala Lumpur ==
Klang Gates Dam

== Malacca ==
Jus Dam - Durian Tunggal Reservoir - Jernih Dam (under construction)

== Negeri Sembilan ==
Gemencheh Dam - Kelinchi Dam - Sungai Terip Dam - Sungai Triang Dam

== Pahang ==
Anak Endau Dam - Chematu Dam - Chereh Dam - Chini Dam - Kelau Dam - Pontian Dam - Sultan Abu Bakar Dam - Ulu Jelai Power Station

== Penang ==
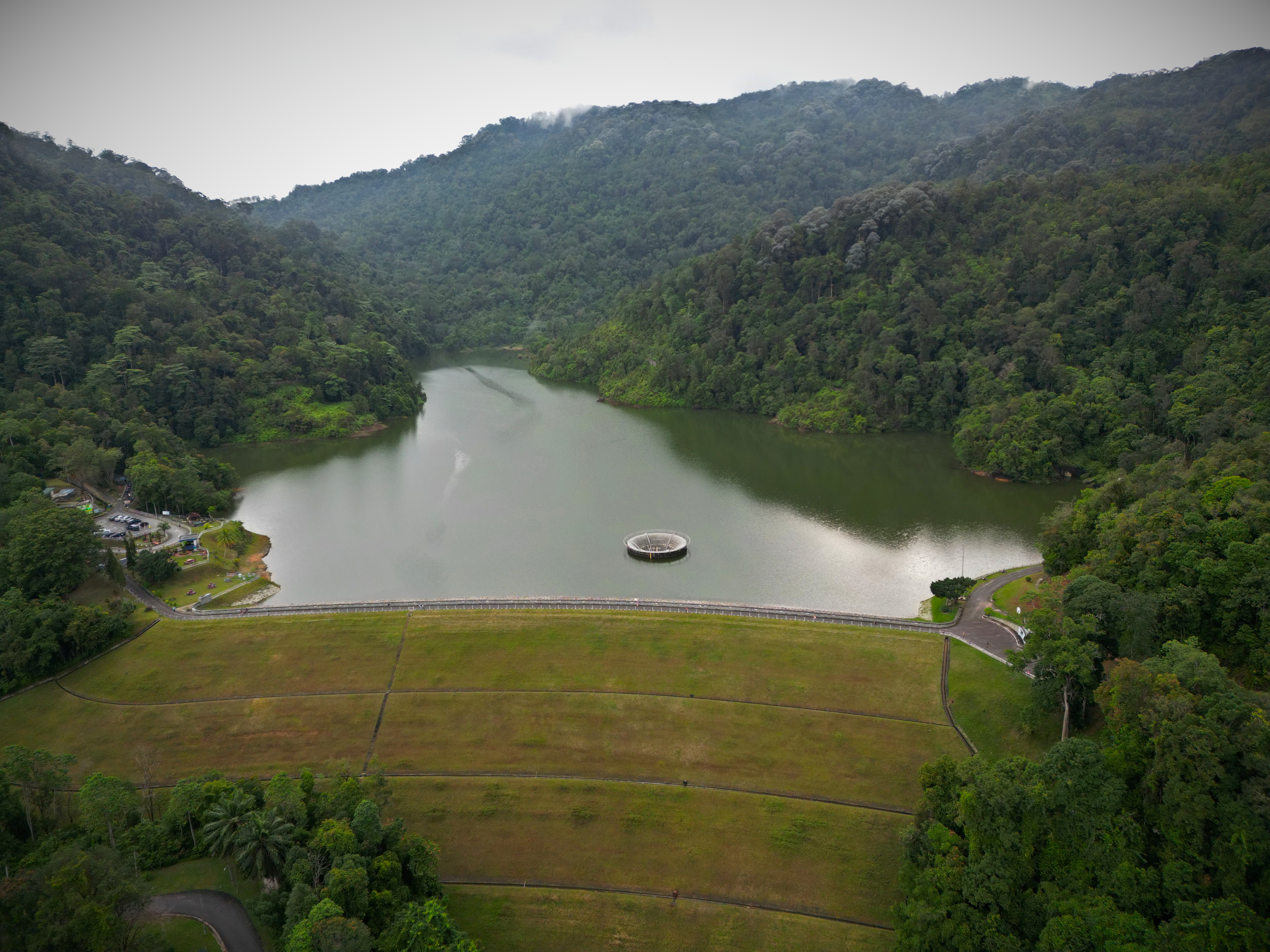
Ayer Itam Dam

Ayer Itam Dam - Mengkuang Dam - Teluk Bahang Dam

== Perak ==
Bersia Dam - Chenderoh Power Station (Chenderoh Dam) - Kenering Dam - Piah Dam - Temenggor Dam - Gopeng Dam - Mahang Dam - Jor Dam

== Perlis ==
Timah Tasoh Dam

== Sabah ==
Babagon Dam - Kaiduan Dam - Tenom Pangi Dam - Ulu Padas Dam (under construction)

== Sarawak ==
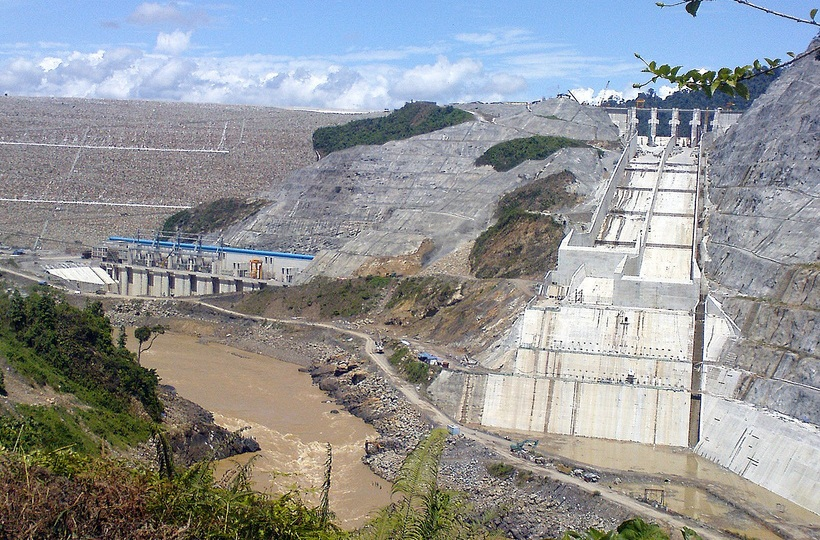
Bakun Dam under construction in June 2009.

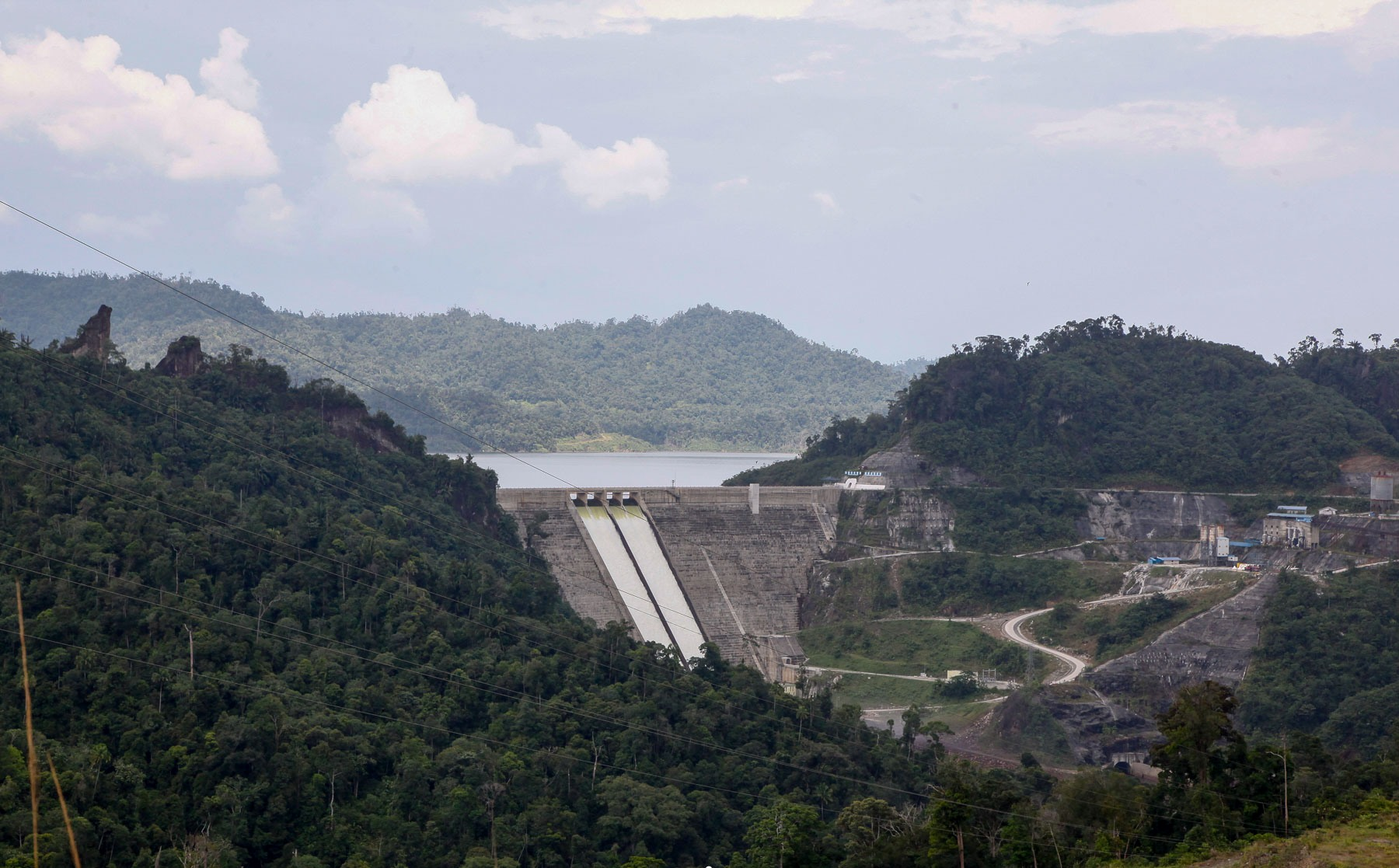
Murum Dam view from afar.

- Bakun Dam
- Baram Dam (proposed)
- Batang Ai Dam
- Bengoh Dam
- Gerugu Dam
- Murum Dam
- Baleh Dam (under construction)
- Trusan Dam (proposed)

== Selangor ==
Batu Dam - Langat Dam - Selangor Dam - Semenyih Dam - Tasik Subang Dam - Tinggi Dam

== Terengganu ==
Kenyir Dam (Sultan Mahmud Power Station)

Puah Dam

Tembat Dam
