= Batu 11 Cheras =

Batu 11 Cheras (Chinese: 蕉赖十一哩) is a Malaysian new village located in Balakong, Selangor, Malaysia. The place was known as 11th miles Cheras during British Colonization in Federation of Malaya. It hosts housing estates and shopping malls and is well connected via highways and trunk roads.

== Transport ==
This village is opposite the Cheras-Kajang Highway (Graand Saga) and the nearest MRT station which is located at Balakong and can reached by walking distance.
