= Klang Royal Town Mosque =

Mosque in Klang, Selangor, Malaysia

Coordinates: 3°02′51.9″N 101°26′44.8″E

Klang Royal Town Mosque Masjid Bandar Diraja Klang
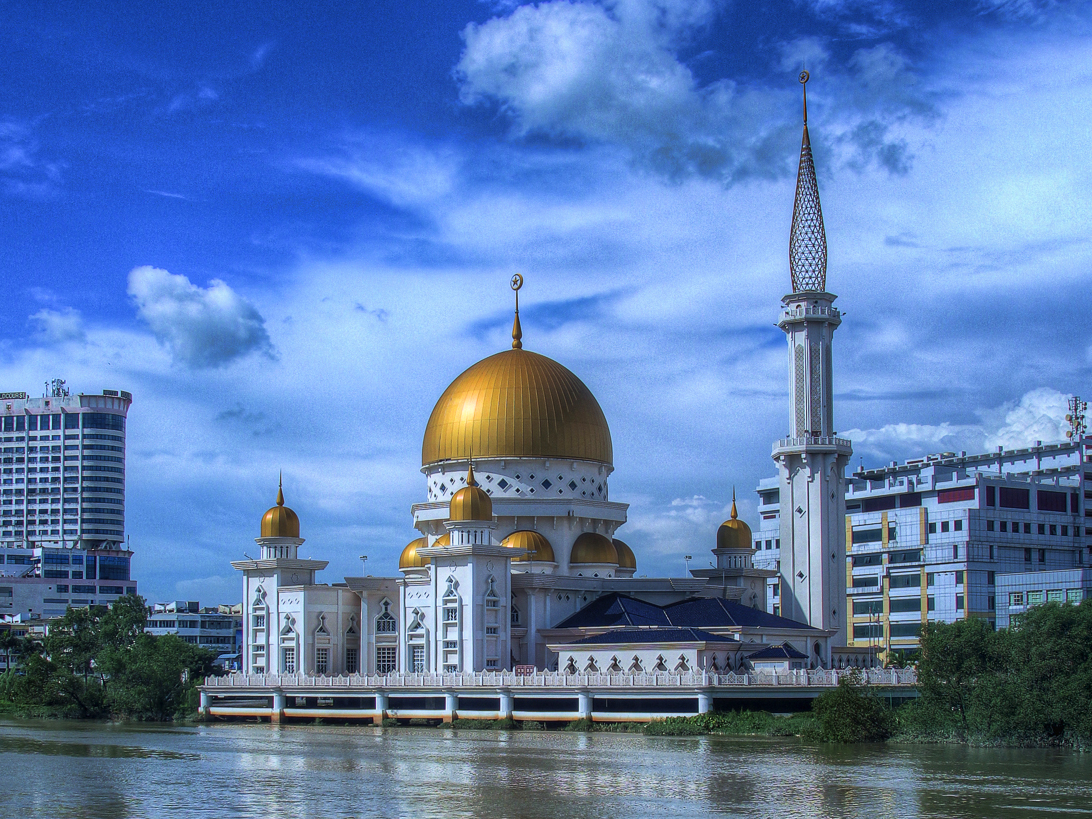

Religion
- Affiliation: Shafi'i

Location
- Location: Selangor, Malaysia
- Municipality: Klang
- Interactive map of Klang Royal Town Mosque; Masjid Bandar Diraja Klang

Architecture
- Founder: Yayasan Islam Nazir-Nazir Masjid Daerah Klang
- Groundbreaking: 2003
- Completed: 2009
- Construction cost: MYR 24.3 million

Specifications
- Capacity: 4000
- Minaret: 1

The Klang Royal Town Mosque (Malay: Masjid Bandar Diraja Klang) is a mosque in Klang, Selangor, Malaysia. The mosque is located at Jalan Pasar on the banks of the Klang River giving the image of a floating mosque.

== History ==
The mosque was built on the site of a smaller mosque known as "Masjid Klang Utara" (Northern Klang Mosque). In 2003, the new mosque was started to be constructed due to bigger crowd faced by nearby mosques, Masjid India and Sultan Sulaiman Mosque. The current mosque was completed in 2009 and was officially opened by Sultan Sharafuddin Idris Shah on 11 December 2009 in conjunction with his birthday celebration.

== Facilities ==
The mosque is equipped with facilities such as the main prayer hall, offices, lecture rooms, outdoor prayer halls, funeral management rooms and catering rooms.

== See also ==
- Islam in Malaysia
