= 1998 Klang Valley water crisis =

Water shortage in Malaysia

Coordinates: 3°15′00.3″N 101°46′05.5″E

The 1998 Klang Valley water crisis occurred in Malaysia in February 1998 when the three reservoir dams in Klang Valley, Klang Gates Dam, Batu Dam and Semenyih Dam suffered a substantial drop in water level following the El Niño phenomenon. The subsequent water shortage affected almost all the residents in the Klang Valley causing the government to impose water rationing prior to the 1998 Commonwealth Games in Kuala Lumpur.

The shortage was blamed on El Nino despite actual rainfall in the months leading up to February 1998 in Federal Territory not being significantly below average. In fact in November 1997, Klang Gates Dam had its highest recorded rainfall. Similarly in October 1997 the Kajang station not far from the Semenyih dam had its highest rainfall in record.

== See also ==
- 2014 Negeri Sembilan and Selangor water crisis
