= Orders, decorations, and medals of Selangor =

The following is the orders, decorations, and medals given by Sultan of Selangor. When applicable, post-nominal letters and non-hereditary titles are indicated.

== Order of precedence for the wearing of order insignias, decorations, and medals ==
Precedence:

1.	Darjah Kerabat Selangor Pertama	D.K. I	--
2.	Darjah Kerabat Selangor Kedua	D.K. II	--
3.	Dato’ Seri Paduka Mahkota Selangor	S.P.M.S.	Dato’ Seri / Datin Paduka Seri
4.	Dato’ Seri Setia Sultan Sharafuddin Idris Shah	S.S.I.S.	Dato’ Setia / Datin Paduka Setia
5.	Dato’ Paduka Mahkota Selangor	D.P.M.S.	Dato’ / Datin Paduka
6.	Dato’ Setia Sultan Sharafuddin Idris Shah	D.S.I.S.	Dato’ / Datin Paduka
7.	Setia Mahkota Selangor	S.M.S.	--
8.	Setia Sultan Sharafuddin Idris Shah	S.I.S.	--
9.	Ahli Mahkota Selangor	A.M.S.	--
10.	Ahli Sultan Sharafuddin Idris Shah	A.I.S.	--
11.	Bintang Perkhidmatan Cemerlang	B.P.C.	--
12.	Pingat Keberanian Yang Terbilang	P.K.T.	--
13.	Pingat Pekerti Yang Terpilih	P.P.T.	--
14.	Pingat Jasa Kebaktian	P.J.K.	--
15.	Pingat Perkhidmatan Cemerlang	P.P.C.	--
16.	Pingat Perkhidmatan Selangor	P.P.S.	--
17.	Watikah Pelantikan Jaksa Pendamai	J.P.	--
---	Dato’ Sri Setia Sultan Salahuddin Abdul Aziz Shah	S.S.S.A.	Dato’ Seri / Datin Paduka Seri	abrogated in 2001
---	Dato’ Setia Sultan Salahuddin Abdul Aziz Shah	D.S.S.A.	Dato’ / Datin Paduka	abrogated in 2001
---	Setia Sultan Salahuddin Abdul Aziz Shah	S.S.A.	--	abrogated in 2001
---	Ahli Sultan Salahuddin Abdul Aziz Shah	A.S.A.	--	abrogated in 2001

== Orders, decorations, and medals ==
The Most Esteemed Royal Family Order of Selangor - Darjah Kerabat Selangor Yang Amat Dihormati

- Founded by Sultan Salahuddin Abdul Aziz Shah on 6 June 1961.
- Awarded to members of the Selangor and other Royal families, and to high officers of state - in two classes :
  - 1. First Class - D.K. I
  - 2. Second Class - D.K. II

The Most Illustrious Order of the Crown of Selangor - Darjah Kebesaran Mahkota Selangor Yang Amat Mulia

- Founded by Sultan Salahuddin Abdul Aziz Shah on 6 June 1961 as a reward for general services to the sultan and state of Selangor.
- Awarded in four classes :
  - 1. Knight Grand Commander or Dato’ Sri Paduka - S.P.M.S.
  - 2. Knight Commander or Dato’ Paduka - D.P.M.S.
  - 3. Companion or Setia - S.M.S.
  - 4. Member or Ahli - A.M.S.

The Order of Sultan Sharafuddin Idris Shah - Darjah Kebesaran Sultan Sharafuddin Idris Shah

- Founded by Sultan Sharafuddin Idris Shah on 14 December 2002.
- Awarded in four classes :
  - 1. Knight Grand Companion or Dato’ Sri Setia - S.S.I.S.
  - 2. Knight Companion or Dato’ Setia - D.S.I.S.
  - 3. Companion or Setia - S.I.S.
  - 4. Member or Ahli - A.I.S.

The Order of Sultan Salahuddin Abdul Aziz Shah - Darjah Kebesaran Sultan Salahuddin Abdul Aziz Shah

- Founded by Sultan Salahuddin Abdul Aziz Shah on 30 September 1985.
- Awarded in four classes :
  - 1. Knight Grand Companion or Dato’ Sri Setia - S.S.S.A.
  - 2. Knight Companion or Dato’ Setia - D.S.S.A.
  - 3. Companion or Setia - S.S.A.
  - 4. Member or Ahli - A.S.A.

Distinguished Service Star - Bintang Perkhidmatan Cemerlang

- Instituted by Sultan Salahuddin Abdul Aziz Shah in 1982 as a reward for distinguished services to the state, in the rank of officer or executive, or above.
- Awarded in a single class, silver star - B.P.C.

Conspicuous Gallantry Medal - Pingat Keberanian Yang Terbilang

- Instituted by Sultan Hishamuddin Alam Shah in 1951 as a reward for supreme acts of gallantry within the borders of the Selangor state.
- Awarded in a single class, silver medal - P.K.T.

Distinguished Conduct Medal - Pingat Pekerti Yang Terpilih

- Instituted by Sultan Hishamuddin Alam Shah in 1951 as a reward for acts of distinguished and gallant conduct within the state of Selangor.
- Awarded in a single class, silver medal - P.P.T.

Meritorious Service Medal - Pingat Jasa Kebaktian

- Instituted by Sultan Hishamuddin Alam Shah in 1951 as a reward for meritorious services to the state, including resourcefulness, devotion to duty, long service, exceptional ability or exemplary conduct.
- Awarded in a single class, silver medal - P.J.K.

Distinguished Service Medal - Pingat Perkhidmatan Cemerlang

- Instituted by Sultan Salahuddin Abdul Aziz Shah in 1982 as a reward for distinguished services to the state, by those in non-executive positions or below.
- Awarded in a single class, silver medal - P.P.C.

Selangor Service Medal - Pingat Perkhidmatan Selangor

- Instituted by Sultan Salahuddin Abdul Aziz Shah in 1977 as a reward for long, meritorious and faithful service to the state of not less than twenty years.
- Awarded in a single class, silver medal - P.P.S.

Coronation Medal 2003 - Pingat Kemahkotaan 2003

- Instituted by Sultan Sharafuddin Idris Shah to commemorate his Coronation in 2003.
- Awarded in a single class, silver medal.

Coronation Medal 1961 - Pingat Kemahkotaan 1961

- Instituted by Sultan Salahuddin Abdul Aziz Shah to commemorate his Coronation on 28 June 1961.
- Awarded in a single class, silver medal.

Silver Jubilee Medal 1985 - Pingat Jubli Perak 1985

- Instituted by Sultan Salahuddin Abdul Aziz Shah to commemorate his Silver Jubilee in 1985.
- Awarded in a single class, silver medal.

== See also ==
- Orders, decorations, and medals of the Malaysian states and federal territories#Selangor
- List of post-nominal letters (Selangor)
