= Indah Water =

Malaysian wastewater company

Indah Water Konsortium Sdn. Bhd. (IWK)
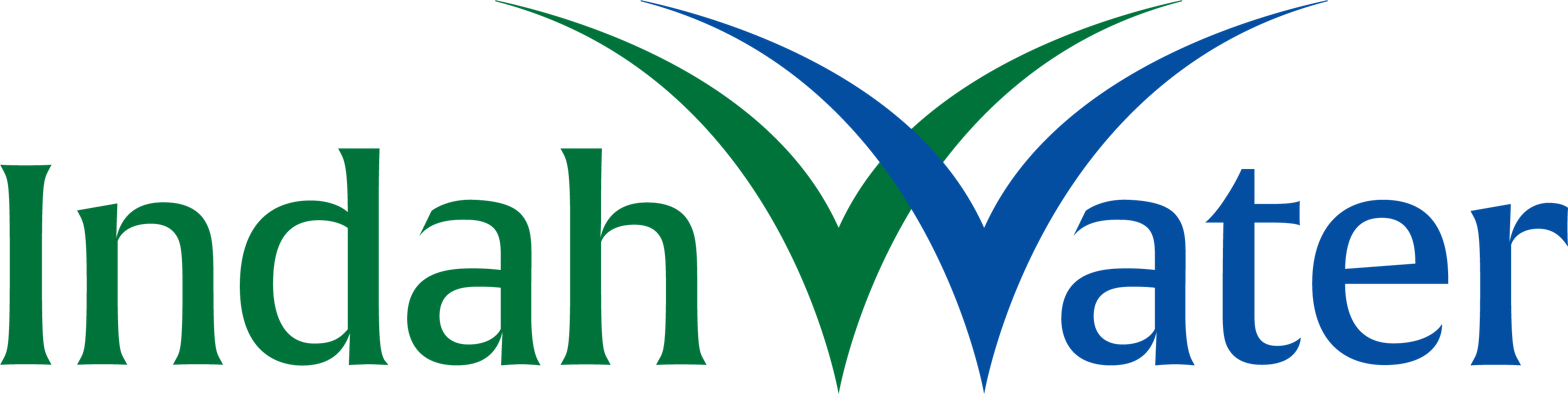
- Company type: State-owned enterprise
- Industry: Waste water and sewerage management
- Founded: 2 April 1994; 32 years ago
- Headquarters: No. 1, Jalan Damansara, 60000 Kuala Lumpur, Malaysia.
- Key people: YB Tuan Haji Ahmad Johnie Bin Zawawi (Chairman); Narendran Maniam (Chief Executive Officer)
- Number of employees: 3,319 (2019)
- Parent: Minister of Finance Incorporated
- Website: www.iwk.com.my

Indah Water Konsortium Sdn. Bhd. (doing business as Indah Water or IWK) is a Malaysian national wastewater and sanitation company. It is a government-owned company under the Minister of Finance Incorporated, which has the task of developing and maintaining a modern and efficient sewerage system for West Malaysia. Its operations and management was well-organized in compliance with standards from the Department of Environment.

== History ==
Indah Water was established on 2 April 1994 when the Federal Government granted the company, a concession for nationwide sewerage services which prior to that, was under the responsibility of local authorities. Since then, the company has taken over the sewerage services from local authorities in all areas except the States of Sabah and Sarawak.

In June 2000, the Government ensured that a well-organized and efficient sewerage system was maintained effectively. The Minister of Finance Incorporated has acquired all equity in Indah Water from its former private owners.

The company shares its wastewater management expertise with several Asian countries under their IWK 2020 Transformation Plan (ITP2020), which was initiated in 2017. The plan will focus on four different pillars namely human capital development, innovation, automation and technology.

As of February 2019, Indah Water served more than 25 million population equivalent, operate and maintain more than 7,000 sewage treatment plants and around 20,000 km underground sewage pipelines.

In December 2019, Indah Water launches a coffee-table book entitled Indah Water Memacu Negara (Indah Water Spurring the Nation) to coincide with its 25th anniversary.

On 1 January 2021, Indah Water took over Kelantan's sewerage.

== Awards and accolades ==
Year	Award-giving body	Category	Recipient	Result	Ref.
2023	2023 Global Water Awards	Distinction Award in the Public Water Agency of the Year	Indah Water	Won	

== See also ==
- Water supply and sanitation in Malaysia
- Sanitation
