= List of post-nominal letters (Selangor) =

Honorific order of the Sultanate of Selangor

This is a list of post-nominal letters used in Selangor. The order in which they follow an individual's name is the same as the order of precedence for the wearing of order insignias, decorations, and medals. When applicable, non-hereditary titles are indicated.

Grades		Post-nominal	Title	Wife's title	Ribbon
The Most Esteemed Royal Family Order of Selangor - Darjah Kerabat Selangor Yang Amat Dihormati
First Class	Darjah Kerabat Selangor Pertama	D.K. I	--	--	
Second Class	Darjah Kerabat Selangor Kedua	D.K. II	--	--	
The Most Illustrious Order of the Crown of Selangor - Darjah Kebesaran Mahkota Selangor Yang Amat Mulia
Knight Grand Commander	Dato' Seri Paduka Mahkota Selangor	S.P.M.S.	Dato' Seri / Datin Paduka Seri	Datin Seri	
Knight Commander	Dato' Paduka Mahkota Selangor	D.P.M.S.	Dato' / Datin Paduka	Datin	
Companion	Setia Mahkota Selangor	S.M.S.	--	--	
Member	Ahli Mahkota Selangor	A.M.S.	--	--	
The Order of Sultan Sharafuddin Idris Shah - Darjah Kebesaran Sultan Sharafuddin Idris Shah
Knight Grand Companion	Dato' Seri Setia Sultan Sharafuddin Idris Shah	S.S.I.S.	Dato' Setia / Datin Paduka Setia	Datin Setia	
Knight Companion	Dato' Setia Sultan Sharafuddin Idris Shah	D.S.I.S.	Dato' / Datin Paduka	Datin	
Companion	Setia Sultan Sharafuddin Idris Shah	S.I.S.	--	--	
Member	Ahli Sultan Sharafuddin Idris Shah	A.I.S.	--	--	
The Order of Sultan Salahuddin Abdul Aziz Shah - Darjah Kebesaran Sultan Salahuddin Abdul Aziz Shah (1985–2001)
Knight Grand Companion	Dato' Sri Setia Sultan Salahuddin Abdul Aziz Shah	S.S.S.A.	Dato' Seri / Datin Paduka Seri	Datin Seri	
Knight Companion	Dato' Setia Sultan Salahuddin Abdul Aziz Shah	D.S.S.A.	Dato' / Datin Paduka	Datin	
Companion	Setia Sultan Salahuddin Abdul Aziz Shah	S.S.A.	--	--	
Member	Ahli Sultan Salahuddin Abdul Aziz Shah	A.S.A.	--	--	
Distinguished Service Star - Bintang Perkhidmatan Cemerlang
Silver Star	Bintang Perkhidmatan Cemerlang	B.P.C.	--	--	
Conspicuous Gallantry Medal - Pingat Keberanian Yang Terbilang
Silver Medal	Pingat Keberanian Yang Terbilang	P.K.T.	--	--	
Distinguished Conduct Medal - Pingat Pekerti Yang Terpilih
Silver Medal	Pingat Pekerti Yang Terpilih	P.P.T.	--	--	
Meritorious Service Medal - Pingat Jasa Kebaktian
Silver Medal	Pingat Jasa Kebaktian	P.J.K.	--	--	
Distinguished Service Medal - Pingat Perkhidmatan Cemerlang
Silver Medal	Pingat Perkhidmatan Cemerlang	P.P.C.	--	--	
Selangor Service Medal - Pingat Perkhidmatan Selangor
Silver Medal	Pingat Perkhidmatan Selangor	P.P.S.	--	--	
Coronation Medal 1961 - Pingat Kemahkotaan 1961
Silver Medal	Pingat Kemahkotaan 1961	--	--	--	
Silver Jubilee Medal 1985 - Pingat Jubli Perak 1985
Silver Medal	Pingat Jubli Perak 1985	--	--	--	
Coronation Medal 2003 - Pingat Kemahkotaan 2003
Silver Medal	Pingat Kemahkotaan 2003	--	--	--	
Silver Jubilee Medal 2026 - Pingat Jubli Perak 2026
Silver Medal	Pingat Jubli Perak 2026	--	--	--	
Justice of the Peace - Watikah Pelantikan Jaksa Pendamai
	Watikah Pelantikan Jaksa Pendamai	J.P.	--	--	None

== See also ==
- Orders, decorations, and medals of Selangor
- Order of precedence in Selangor
