= Gurdwara Sahib Klang =

Gurdwara in Selangor, Malaysia

Religion
- Affiliation: Sikhism

Location
- Location: Klang, Selangor, Malaysia
- Geographic coordinates: 3.0412°N 101.4446°E

Gurdwara Sahib Klang is a Sikh gurdwara located in the town of Klang in Selangor, Malaysia. It was constructed between November 1993 and late 1995. The total cost of the building was nearly RM 2,000,000 and out of which RM 100,000 was donated by the Prime Minister's Department. Donations were received from the Sikh Sangat from all over Malaysia to complete this project.

Before residing at the current location in Jalan Bukit Jawa, it was relocated once, at Jalan Raya Barat beside the Majlis Perbandaran Klang (Klang Municipal Council) Headquarters. It is the main place of worship for Sikhs living in Klang.

The gurdwara was officially opened by the sangat on February 17, 1996. The Sikh Holy Book, the Guru Granth Sahib, was respectfully taken in a procession from the previous Gurdwara Sahib in Jalan Raya Barat to its new location in Jalan Bukit Jawa. The Dasmesh Band headed by Sardar Sukhdev Singh led the procession. Akhand Path prayers were held on the following day.

The top floor comprises the Darbar Sahib, which can accommodate about 1,000 people. The ground floor consists of a langar (dining hall), a kitchen, an office and a library, visitors' rooms and classrooms for holding Punjabi classes. The Granthi's quarters are located in a separate building adjacent to the Darbar Sahib.

== History ==
By the late 19th century, Klang town was an important commercial trading center. Many Sikhs were employed by the Federated Malay States Police to maintain law and order. Gradually, more Sikhs arrived in Klang and became watchmen, money lenders, dairy farmers, bullock cart operators and chauffeurs.

In 1900, there were about 50 Sikhs in Klang. They built their first gurdwara on a piece of land about 500 square feet (46 m^{2}) in size. The first Gurdwara Sahib building was a wooden structure with an "attap" roof. This Gurdwara Sahib land was formally gazetted as a Sikh Temple Reserve in 1931.

By 1930, there were about 200 Sikhs living in and around Klang and the Gurdwara Sahib was inadequate to accommodate the ever-growing sangat. Between 1933 and 1934, a double storey wooden building with a tiled roof was built on the site of the original Gurdwara Sahib. The land area was expanded to 1,200 square feet (110 m^{2}). In 1972, the land area was further expanded by another 600 feet (180 m). The gurdwara building was then repaired, renovated and refurbished.

By 1985, the Sikhs residing in Klang, Kapar, Meru, Kuala Selangor and Banting, who by this time numbered about 1,200 people, were attending religious functions in the Klang Gurdwara Sahib. Therefore, the need for bigger premises arose, but there was no land available to expand the Gurdwara Sahib.

In August 1989, the Government offered the Sikh community of Klang a new site about an acre in size, Lot Number 970, which is the location of the present Gurdwara Sahib.

== Religious activities conducted by the gurdwara ==
There are presently about 300 Sikh families who participate in the religious activities in this Gurdwara Sahib. There are also about 250 students who attend Punjabi classes once a week on Saturday afternoons. The Management Committee comprises the President, Secretary, Treasurer, their assistants and five committee members.

There is a Sikh Assistant Registrar of Marriages in this Gurdwara Sahib who officiates at Sikh marriages. Actual marriage ceremonies are conducted by the Granthi in accordance with Sikh rites.
