= Order of precedence in Selangor =

Relative preeminence of officials for ceremonial purposes

The Selangor order of precedence is a nominal and symbolic hierarchy of important positions within the state of Selangor. It has no legal standing but is used to dictate ceremonial protocol at events of a state nature.

== Order of precedence ==
No.	Description
*	His Royal Highness The Sultan
*	Her Royal Highness The Tengku Permaisuri
*	His Highness The Raja Muda
*	Her Highness The Raja Puan Muda
*	The widows of previous Sultan Permaisuri Siti Aishah Binti Abd Rahman
1	The Prime Minister
2	The Deputy Prime Minister
3	The Menteri Besar
4	The Chief Justice
5	Grand Commanders of the Most Distinguished Order of the Defender of the State (SMN)
6	Grand Commanders of the Distinguished Order of Loyalty to the Crown of Malaysia (SSM)
7	The Judges
8	The Speaker of the Legislative Assembly
9	The Deputy to the Menteri Besar
10	The State Secretary
11	Ex officio member of the Executive Council
12	Federal Ministers
13	Chief Secretary to the Government
14	High Commissioners and Ambassadors
15	Other foreign representatives
16	Federal Deputy Ministers
17	Members of the Legislative Assembly
18	Attorney-General
19	Chief of Armed Forces
20	Inspector-General of Police
21	Mayor of Kuala Lumpur
22	Senators
23	Members of the House of Representatives
24	Chairperson of State Public Service Commission
25	Chief of Army, Navy and Air Forces
26	Officers equivalent to Grade 48 and above
27	Head of Federal and State Departments

== See also ==
- List of post-nominal letters (Selangor)
