= Al-Falah Mosque, Selangor =

Mosque in Shah Alam, Selangor, Malaysia

Al-Falah Mosque
- Masjid Al-Falah
- Location within Selangor

Religion
- Affiliation: Islam
- Branch/tradition: Sunni

Location
- Location: Subang Jaya, Selangor, Malaysia
- Interactive map of Al-Falah Mosque
- Coordinates: 03°04′20″N 101°31′00″E

Architecture
- Type: mosque

The Al-Falah Mosque (Malay: Masjid Al-Falah) is a mosque in Shah Alam, Selangor, Malaysia. It opened in Section 30 on 8 June 2018.

== See also ==
- Islam in Malaysia
