= Batu Dam =

Dam in Gombak, Selangor, Malaysia

- Interactive map of Batu Dam
- Country: Malaysia
- Location: Gombak, Selangor
- Coordinates: 3°16′24.0″N 101°41′10.5″E
- Purpose: Drinking water, Flood control

Reservoir
- Normal elevation: 98 metres

Batu Dam (Malay: Empangan Batu) is a dam in Gombak District, Selangor, Malaysia. The dam is a water supply dam with holding capacity of 30,199 megalitre. The Sungai Batu water treatment plant produces 114 megalitre per day of treated water.

== See also ==
- 1998 Klang Valley water crisis
