= Klang Gates Dam =

Dam in Gombak, Selangor, Malaysia

Coordinates: 3.2354°N 101.7503°E

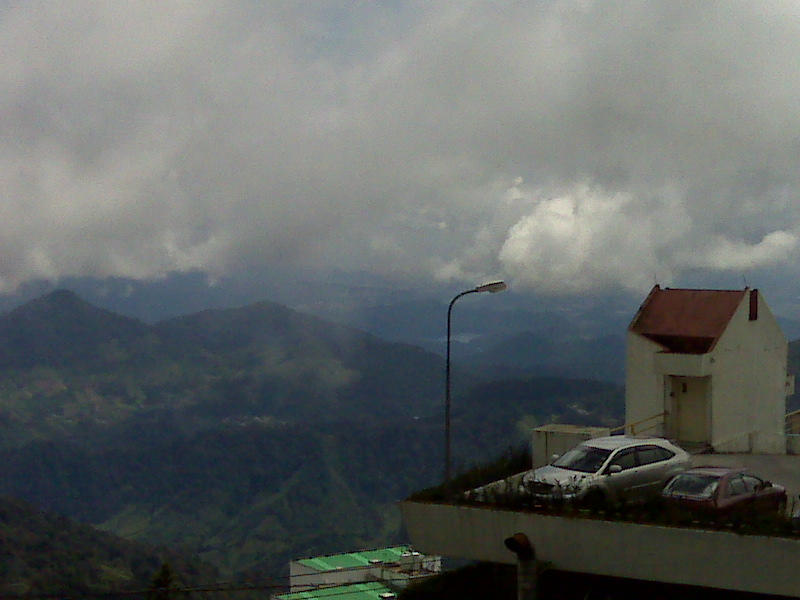
Part of the reservoir, seen from Genting Highlands

Klang Gates Dam (Malay: Empangan Klang Gates) is a dam in Ulu Klang, Gombak District, Selangor, Malaysia. It is also known as the Bukit Tabur Dam. Completed in 1958, the dam is the first dam in Malaysia for water supply. It is a concrete arch dam with a spillway in the centre.

The reservoir impounded by the dam is one of the major sources of drinking water for residents of the Klang Valley, where the national capital, Kuala Lumpur, is located. The dam's water storage capacity is 25,104 million liters. The Bukit Nanas water treatment plant takes raw water from this reservoir and produces 145 million liters of treated water per day.

During the 2014 water crisis, capacity dropped as low as 54%, providing only approximately 80 days of water supply.

Beside the dam is Klang Gate Ridge, the largest quartz ridge in the world. Split into two sections known as Bukit Tabur West and Bukit Tabur East, the ridge is 200m wide and has a length of 22km. It is unique for its sheer size as well as for its four types of quartz formations. The ridge is rich in vegetation, supporting at least 265 plant species including 5 endemic ones. A rare animal, the serow (a mountain goat), is also found on the ridge.

== See also ==
- 1998 and 2014 water crisis
