= Kajang station =

Train station in Kuala Lumpur, Malaysia

KB06 KG35 Kajang
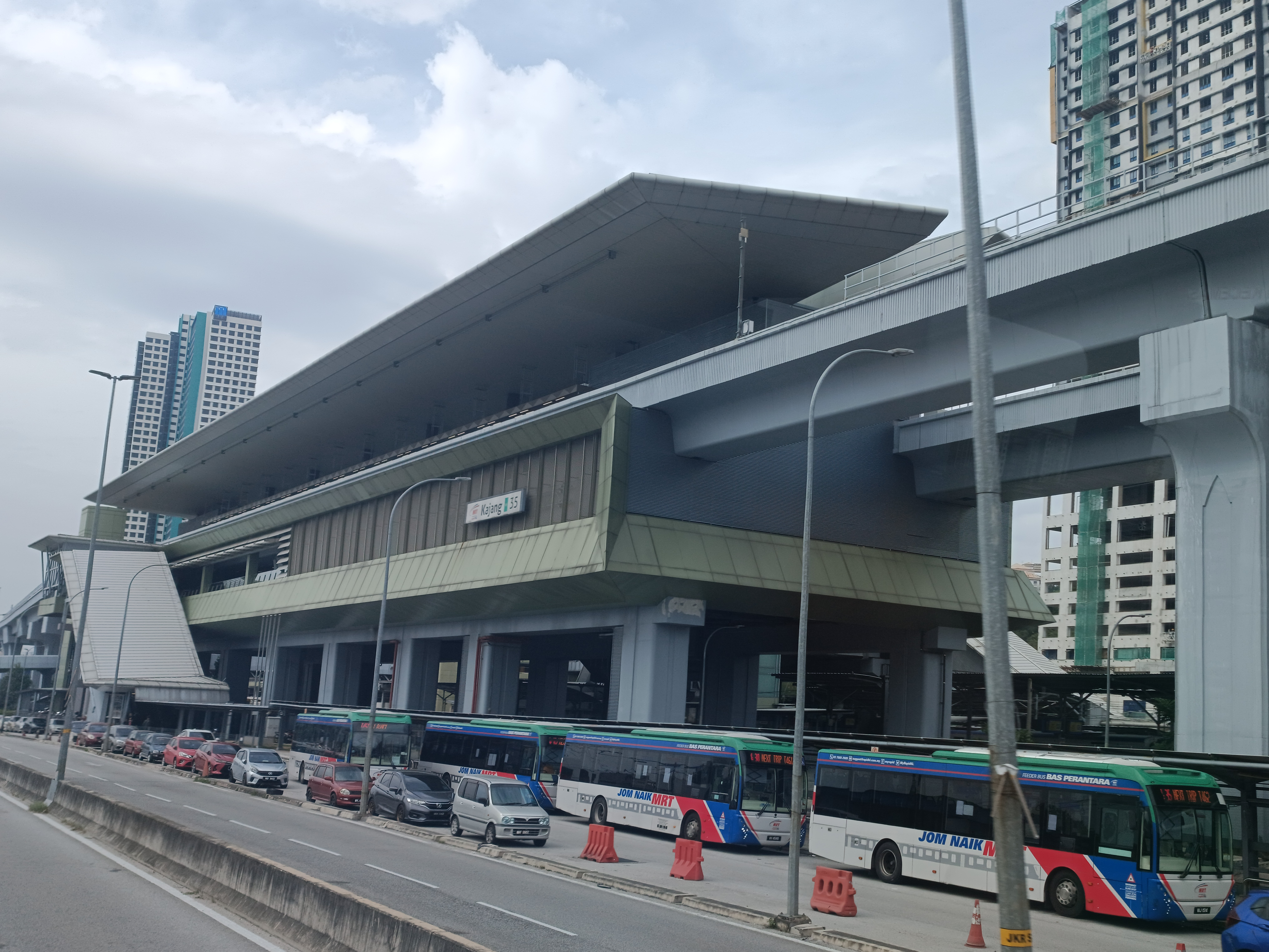
- View of the integrated station building

General information
- Other names: Malay: کاجڠ (Jawi); Chinese: 加影; Tamil: காஜாங்
- Location: Jalan Bukit, 43000 Kajang; Selangor; Malaysia
- Coordinates: 2°58′58″N 101°47′25″E
- System: Rapid KL (MRT)
- Owner: Railway Assets Corporation (KTM); MRT Corp (MRT)
- Operator: Keretapi Tanah Melayu (KTM); Rapid Rail (MRT)
- Lines: West Coast Line; 9 Kajang Line
- Platforms: 1 side platform and 1 island platform (KTM); 1 island platform (MRT)
- Tracks: 4 (KTM); 2 (MRT)
- Connections: Rapid KL : 450, T451, T461, T462, T463, T464

Construction
- Structure type: KB06 Surface; KG35 Elevated
- Parking: Available with payment.1460 parking bays; 600 motorcycle bays.
- Cycle facilities: Available. 31 bicycle bays
- Accessible: Yes

Other information
- Station code: KB06 KG35

History
- Opened: 14 August 1897; 129 years ago (KTM); 17 July 2017; 9 years ago (MRT)
- Rebuilt: 10 November 1995 (KTM), 2017 (MRT & KTM)
- Electrified: 1995 (KTM)

Services
Preceding station	KTM Komuter	Following station
Serdang towards Batu Caves	Batu Caves–Pulau Sebang Line	Kajang 2 towards Pulau Sebang/Tampin
Preceding station	ETS	Following station
Bandar Tasik Selatan towards KL Sentral	KL Sentral–JB Sentral (Platinum)	Seremban towards JB Sentral
Bandar Tasik Selatan towards Padang Besar	Padang Besar–JB Sentral (Gold)	Seremban towards JB Sentral
Bandar Tasik Selatan towards Butterworth	Butterworth–Segamat (Gold)	Seremban towards Segamat
Preceding station		Following station
Stadium Kajang towards Kwasa Damansara	Kajang Line	Terminus
Route map
- Diagram is not to scale Source
Location

Kajang station is a Malaysian railway and rapid transit station located near and named after the town of Kajang, Selangor. The station is situated 1 km (5/8 mi) south of Kajang's town centre. The station is the namesake and southern terminus of the MRT Kajang Line.

== Services ==
The station is currently served by KTM Komuter's Batu Caves–Pulau Sebang Line and KTM ETS train services, as well as Rapid KL's Kajang Line.

The current Kajang Komuter station inherits the original station's branch lines and responsibilities to manage railway switches, railway monitoring and goods delivery. The station employs a number of railway staff. The station is also connected to sheds for railway maintenance vehicles, as well as a warehouse. The station contains three platforms: Platform 1 is a side platform with full-length track and extended shed; Platforms 2 and 3 are an island platform. The platforms are lined along with a set of four main lines; three run between the two platforms and one runs along the other side of the island platform. The line between platforms 1 and 3 is the main route. Platform 2 can be used for any service, while the platform 3 line is only used when platform 2 is occupied by another train.

The MRT platforms are elevated, along with the new KTM concourse, replacing the former ground-level station. Feeder bus services are available as well. Paid-area integration between the KTM and MRT is not available as both systems are owned and operated by different companies; passengers are required to purchase separate tickets to enter each line and system.

== History ==
The original station was opened in 1897. KTM Intercity services were provided for the town from its early years through the 20th century, while KTM Komuter services were introduced in the mid-1990s, when a new station adjoining Jalan Bukit (Malay; English: Hill Road) was completed on the east side of the tracks to replace the older station adjoining Jalan Reko (Reko Road) on the west side of the tracks.

=== Renovations ===
The KTM ground station has undergone a few remodellings throughout its service. The platforms were extended to support KTM Intercity trains that occasionally stretch longer than the station's platforma. A second access area for the station was completed and opened for access at the west side of the tracka in 2004, but has no operational faregates and had only introduced manual ticketing services from early-2007 onwards. The installation of larger platform canopy roofs was also undertaken during the first half of 2007.

=== Mass Rapid Transit (MRT) ===
On 8 July 2011, the final alignment of the MRT Kajang Line was announced with 31 stations; Kajang railway station being one of the interchange stations. Active construction started around August 2012; it was completed and opened to the public on 17 July 2017, along with other Phase 2 stations on the line. At its opening, the station was the southernmost station in Rapid KL's rail network until it was surpassed by Putrajaya Sentral on 16 March 2023.

The MRT construction project included the rebuilding of the KTM station, with a new connecting stairwell and redesigned wayfinding sigsn in similar style to the MRT station. A shared elevated concourse was built over the existing KTM tracks. When the overhead concourse was finished, the KTM ticket counter, customer service counter and offices were moved to the Level 1 of the station beside the MRT customer service counter. The on-ground station building was then demolished, and stairs, escalators and lifts were added to link the platforms with the new concourse.

== Bus Services ==
=== MRT Feeder Bus Services ===
With the opening of the MRT Kajang Line, feeder buses also began operating, linking the station with several housing areas and towns around the Kajang and Bangi areas. The feeder buses operate from the station's feeder bus at Entrance A of the station.

Route No.	Origin	Destination	Via
T451 (As a pass-by)	KG34 Stadium Kajang	National University of Malaysia (UKM)	Jalan Besar; KB06 KG35 Kajang; Jalan Reko; Reko Sentral; KB06A Kajang 2 Hentian Kajang; Sungai Tangkas; KB07 UKM
T461	KB06 KG35 Kajang	Taman Kajang Utama	Jalan Reko; Kajang Dispersal Link Expressway (SILK); Kajang Utama
T462	KB06 KG35 Kajang	Bandar Baru Bangi Seksyen 8	Jalan Reko; Reko Sentral; Bangi Seksyen 4 Tambahan; Bangi Seksyen 7 Sungai Ramal; Kompleks PKNS Bangi; Bangi Seksyen 8 & 9 (Bandar Baru Bangi)
T463	KB06 KG35 Kajang	Bandar Baru Bangi Seksyen 4	Jalan Reko; Reko Sentral; Bangi Seksyen 4 Tambahan; Petronas UNIKEB 2
T464 (As a pass-by)	Bandar Baru Bangi Seksyen 16	KB06 KG35 Kajang	Persiaran Kemajuan; Bangi Gateway; Teras Jernang; National University of Malaysia (UKM); KB07 UKM; Sungai Tangkas; Hentian Kajang; KB06A Kajang 2 Reko Sentral; Jalan Reko; Bandar Kajang; Jalan Besar, Kajang

=== Other Bus Services ===
The station is also served by other bus routes.

Route No.	Operator	Origin	Destination	Via	Remarks
450	Rapid KL	Mydin Sinar Kota, Kuala Lumpur (Hub Lebuh Pudu); AG7 SP7 KJ13 Masjid Jamek	Hentian Kajang	Jalan Pudu; Jalan Pasar; Jalan Cheras; AG13 KG22 Maluri; Taman Pertama; KG24 Taman Midah; KG25 Taman Mutiara / Leisure Mall; Taman Suntex; Cheras–Kajang Expressway; KG31 Bukit Dukung; Simpang Balak; Sungai Sekamat; KG33 Sungai Jernih / KPJ Kajang; Bandar Kajang; KB06 KG35 Kajang; Reko Sentral; KB06A Kajang 2	Some buses may not enter the station's bus stop (for Kajang-bound only). For KL-bound buses, passengers have to cross Jalan Reko to access the station.
451 (Trial run 1 July 2023 to 16 January 2026)(Terminated)	Rapid KL	KB06 KG35 Kajang	KT3 PY41 Putrajaya Sentral	Hentian Kajang; Kompleks PKNS Bangi; SK Kampung Abu Bakar Baginda; Presint 15 Putrajaya; Kompleks F Putra Square, Putrajaya; Presint 2,3,4 Putrajaya	No longer available as of 16 January 2026; Passengers may use alternative services such as interchanging at KG20 PY23 Tun Razak Exchange (via) or KB04 SP15 KT2 Bandar Tasik Selatan (via KTM Komuter and ERL)

== Gallery ==
=== General ===
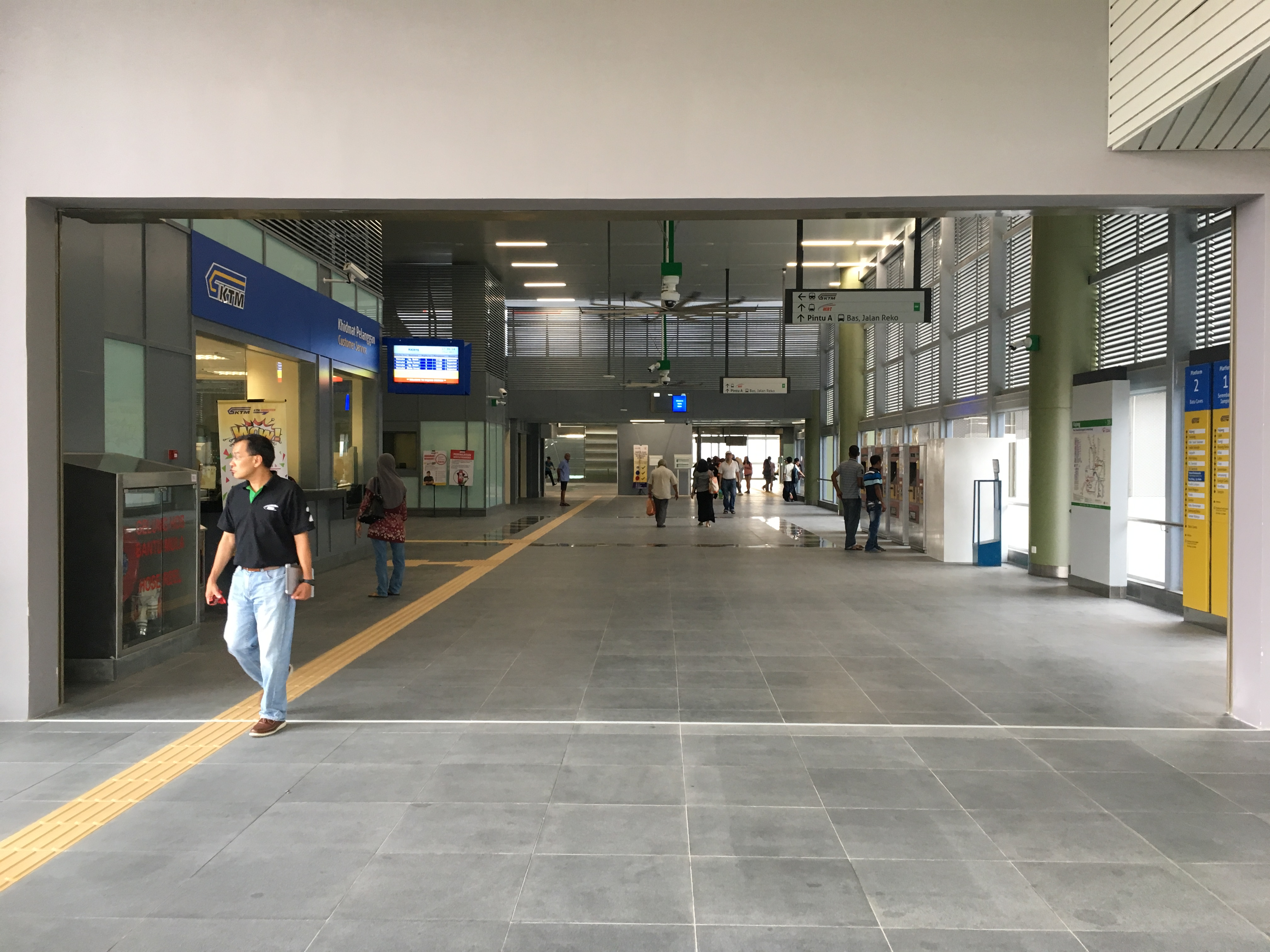
KTM and MRT common concourse of the station

=== KTM station ===
==== Ground level (demolished) ====
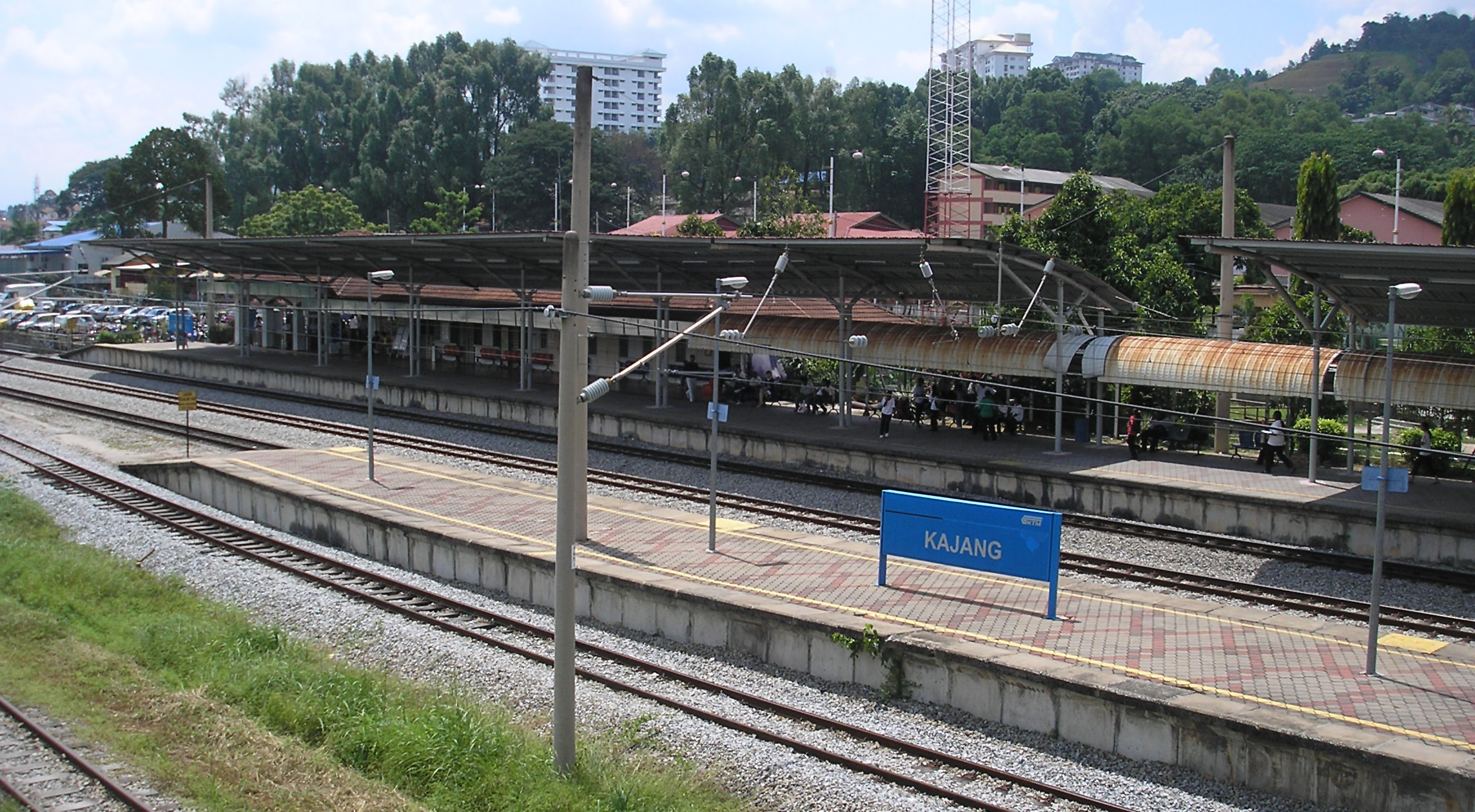
The station in 2007 before the MRT station was built

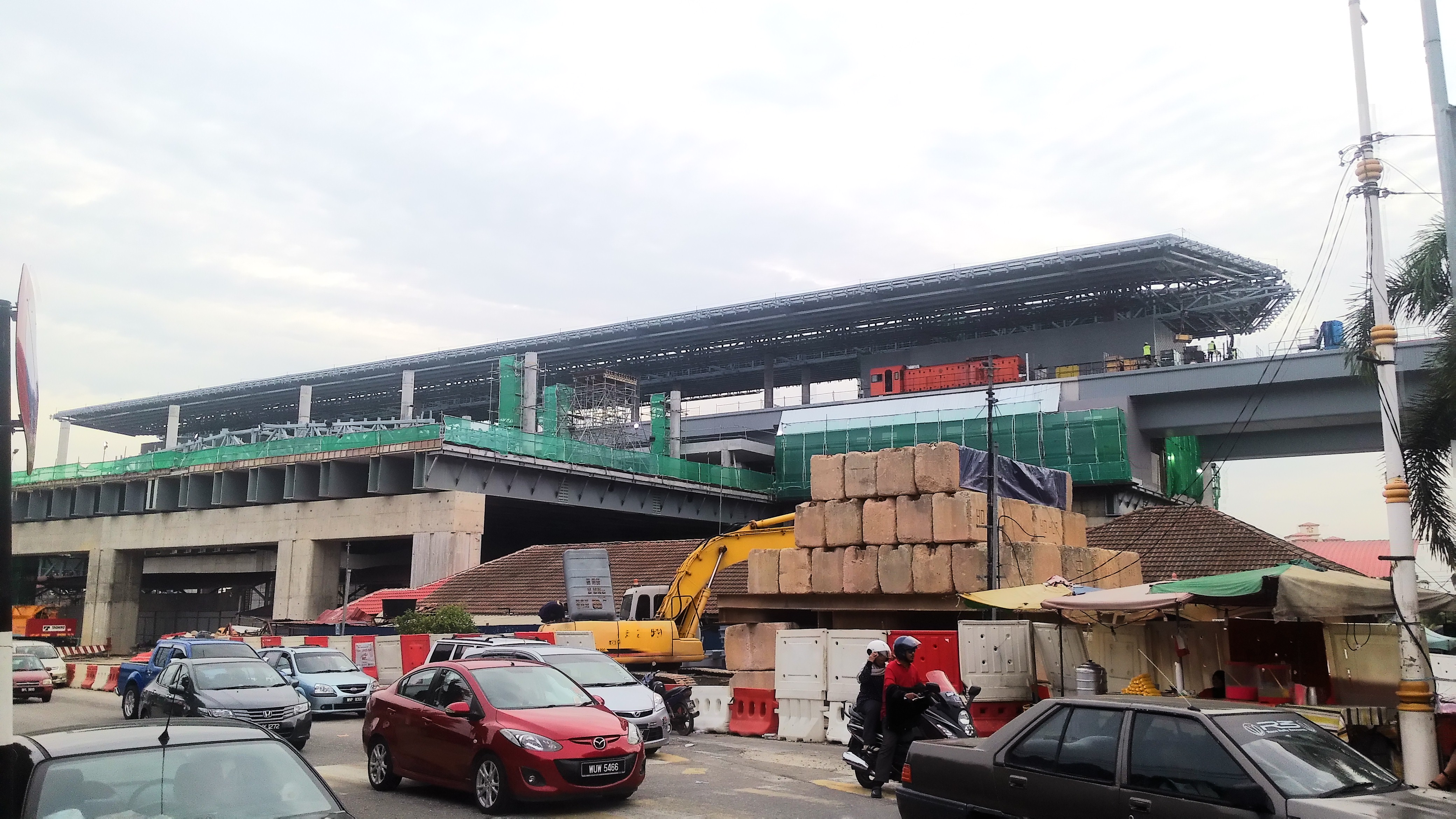
Ground entrance blocked for MRT Kajang Line construction

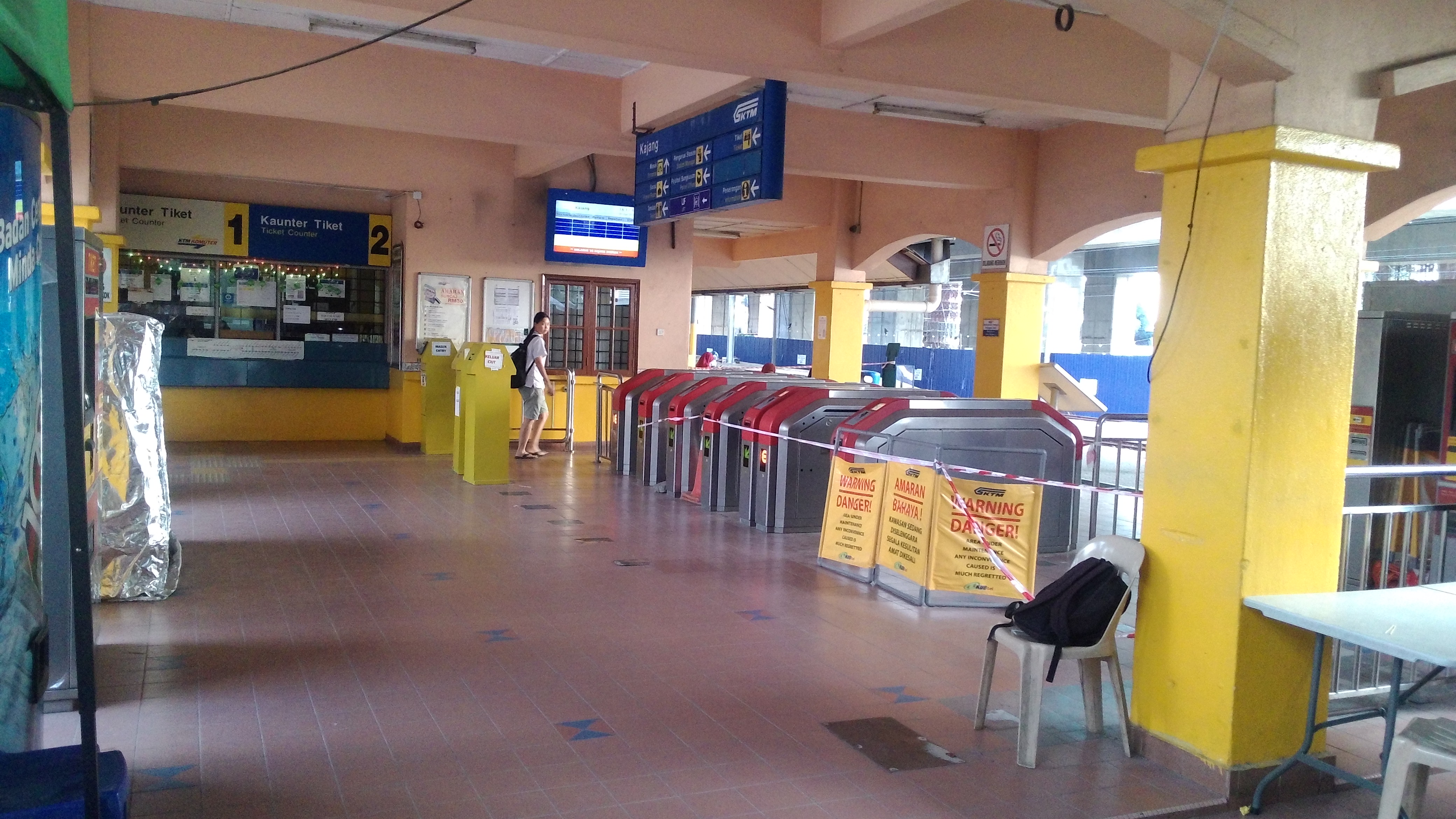
Ticket counter and faregates

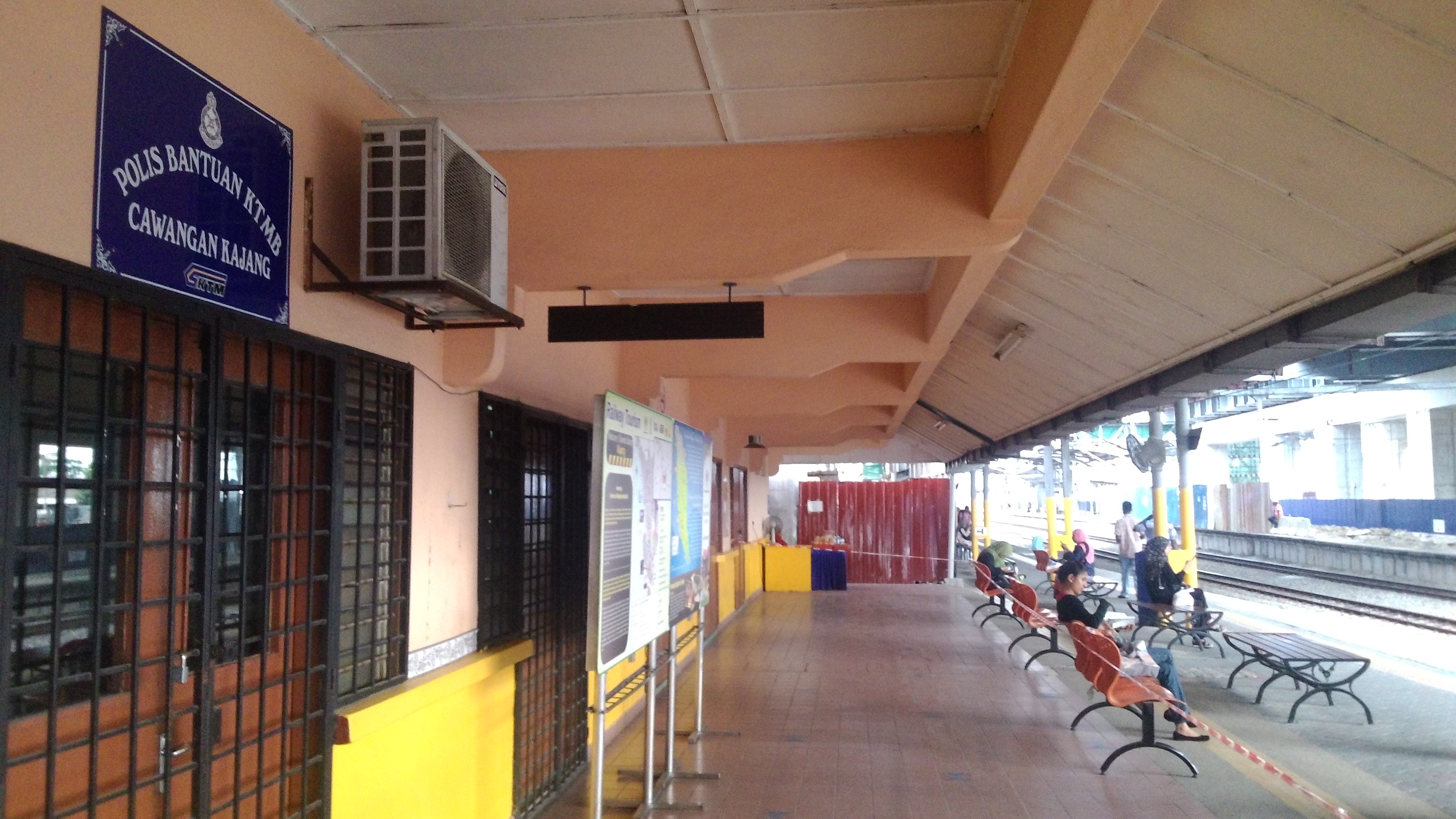
Platform 1 seating area with police station

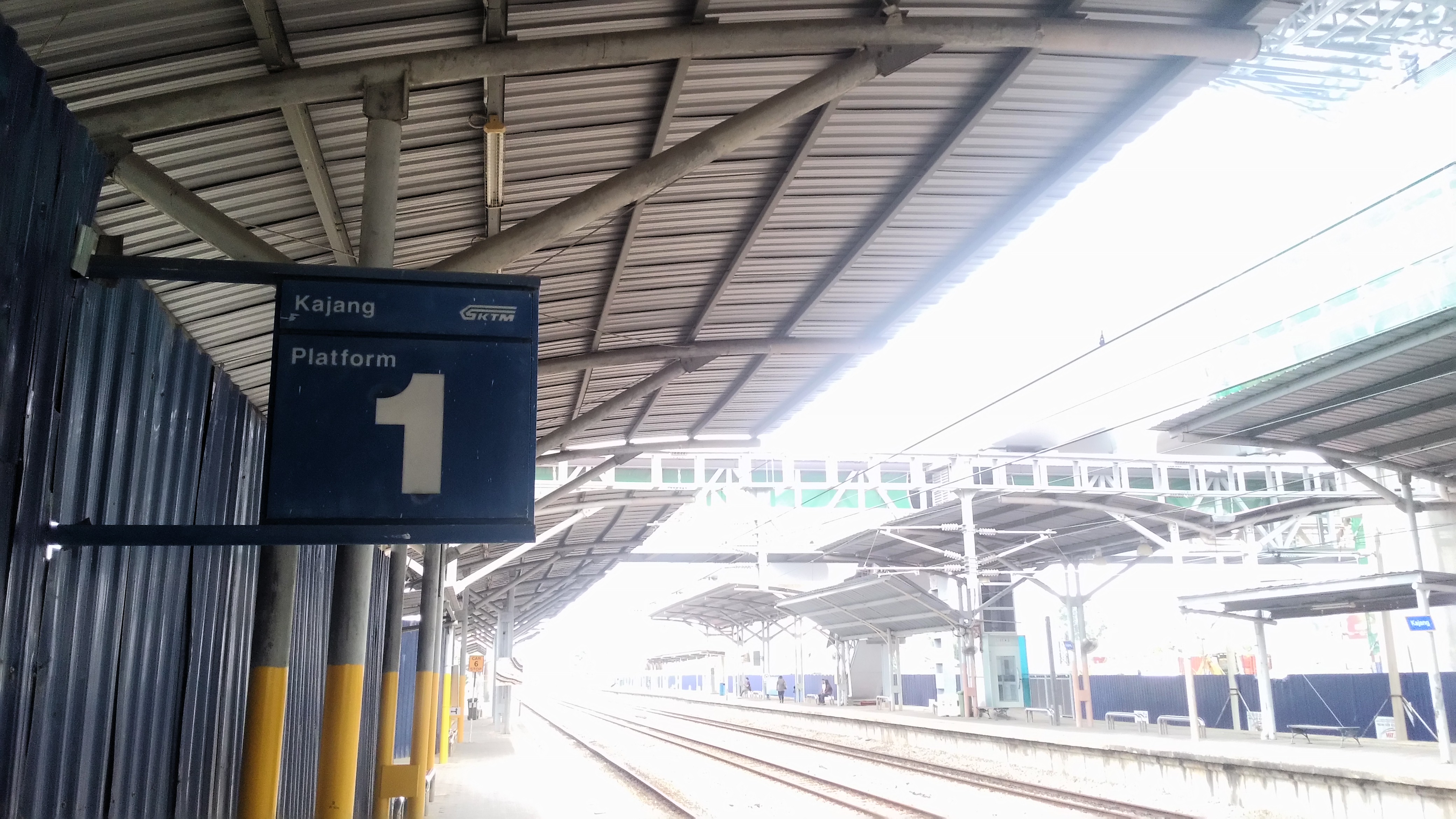
Platform 1 sign

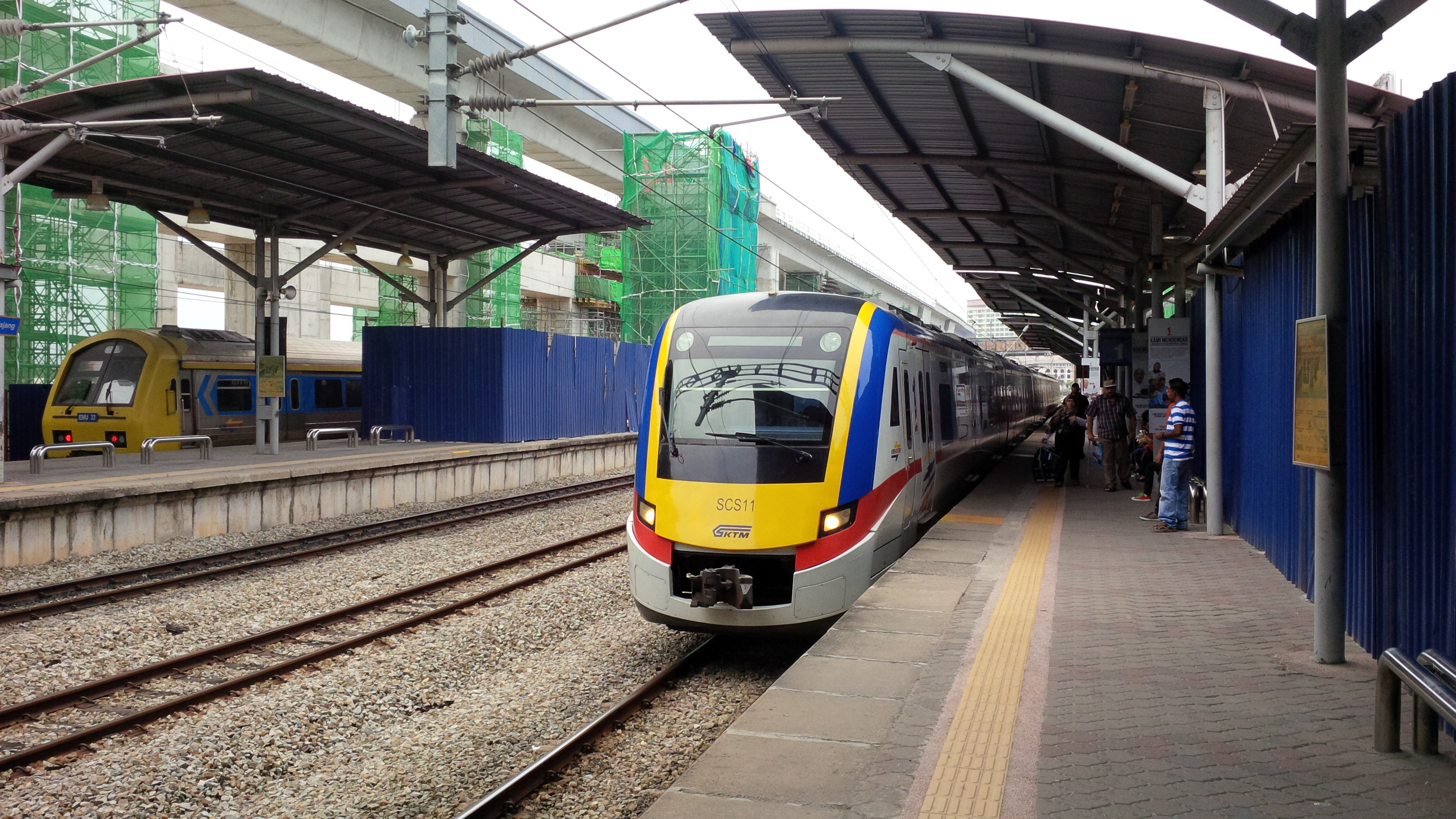
KTM Komuter train at the KTM platform, with the MRT station construction in progress in the background

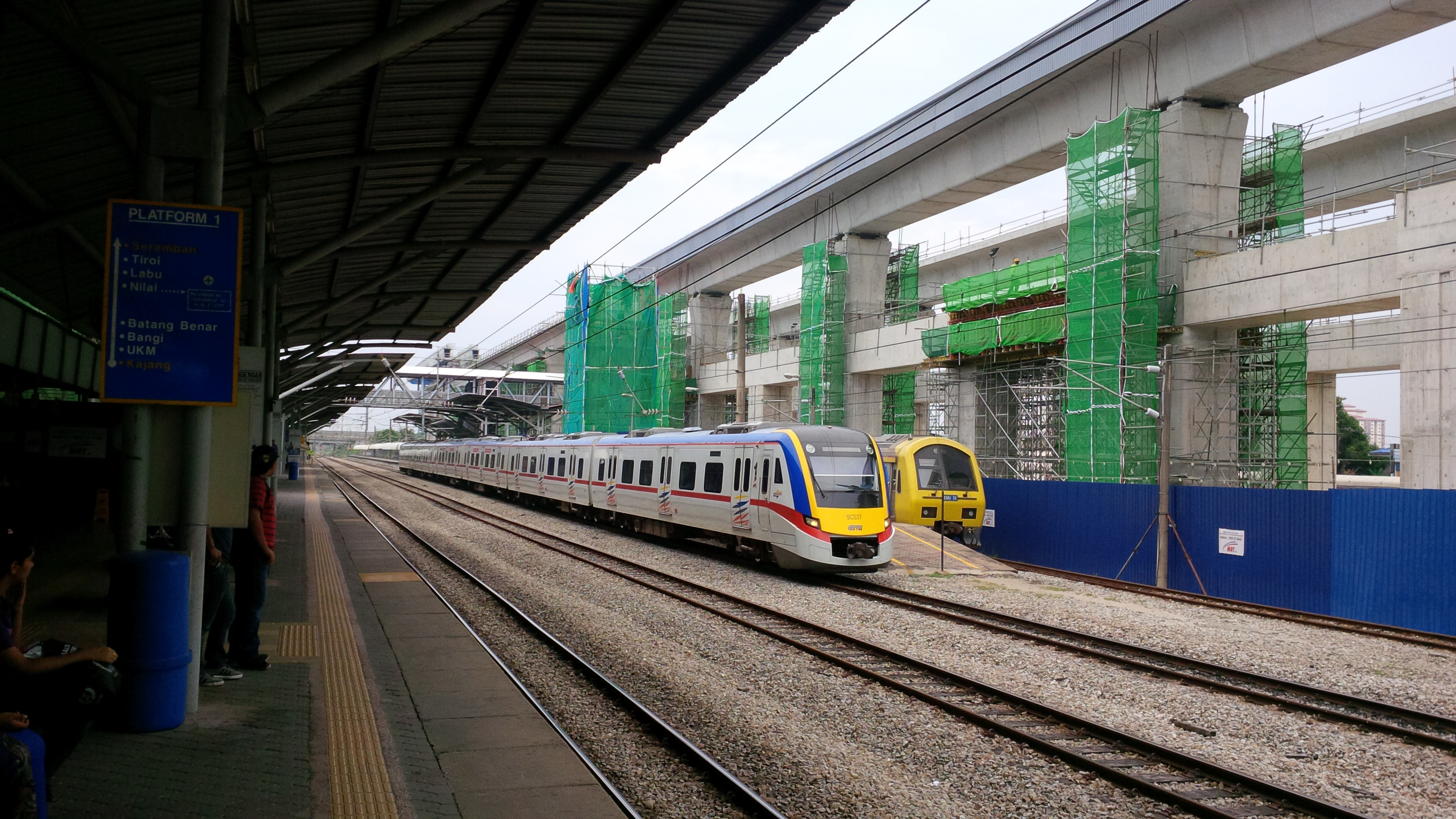
KTM station with the MRT station construction in the background

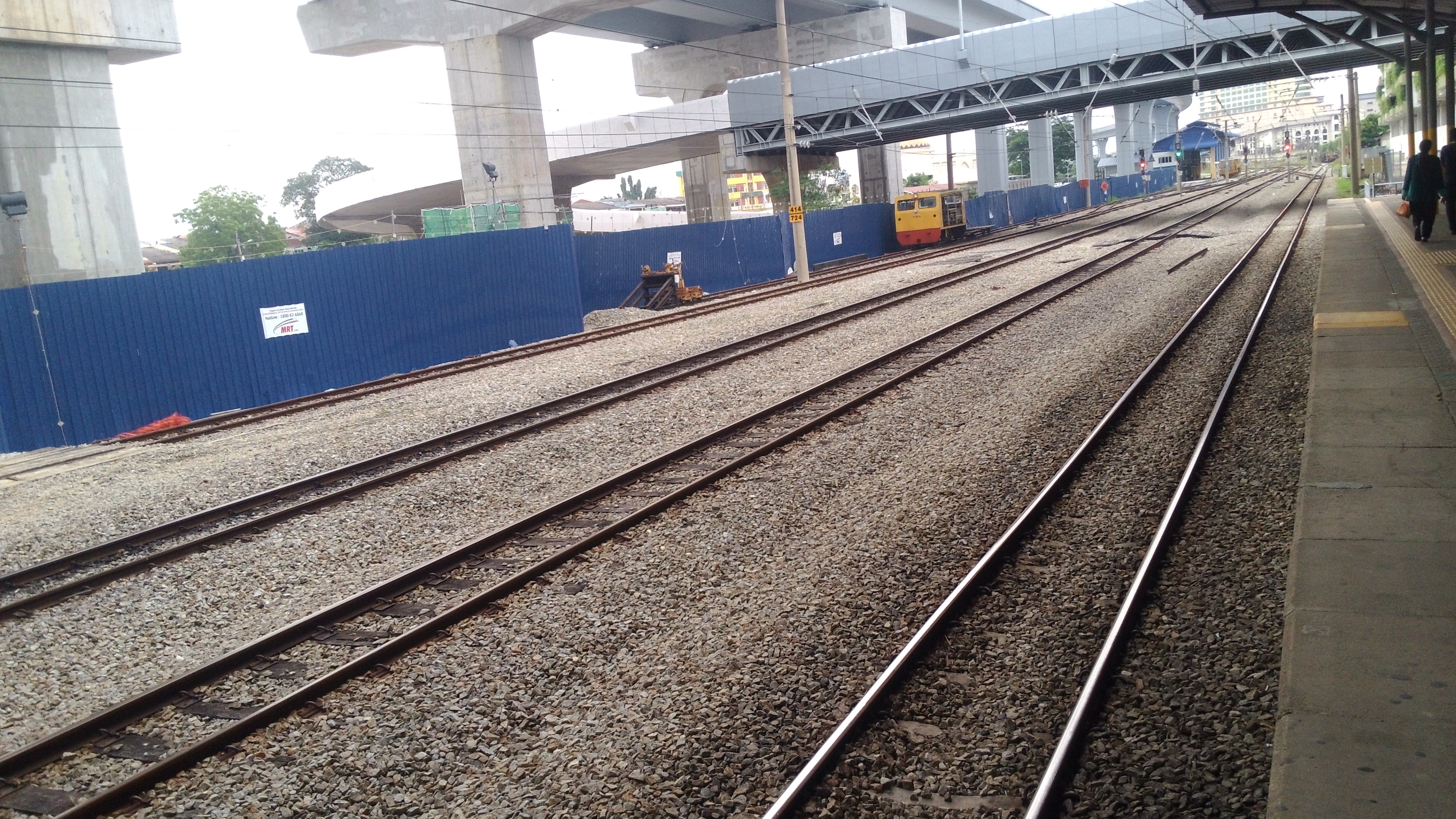
View of the four tracks of the station towards the north

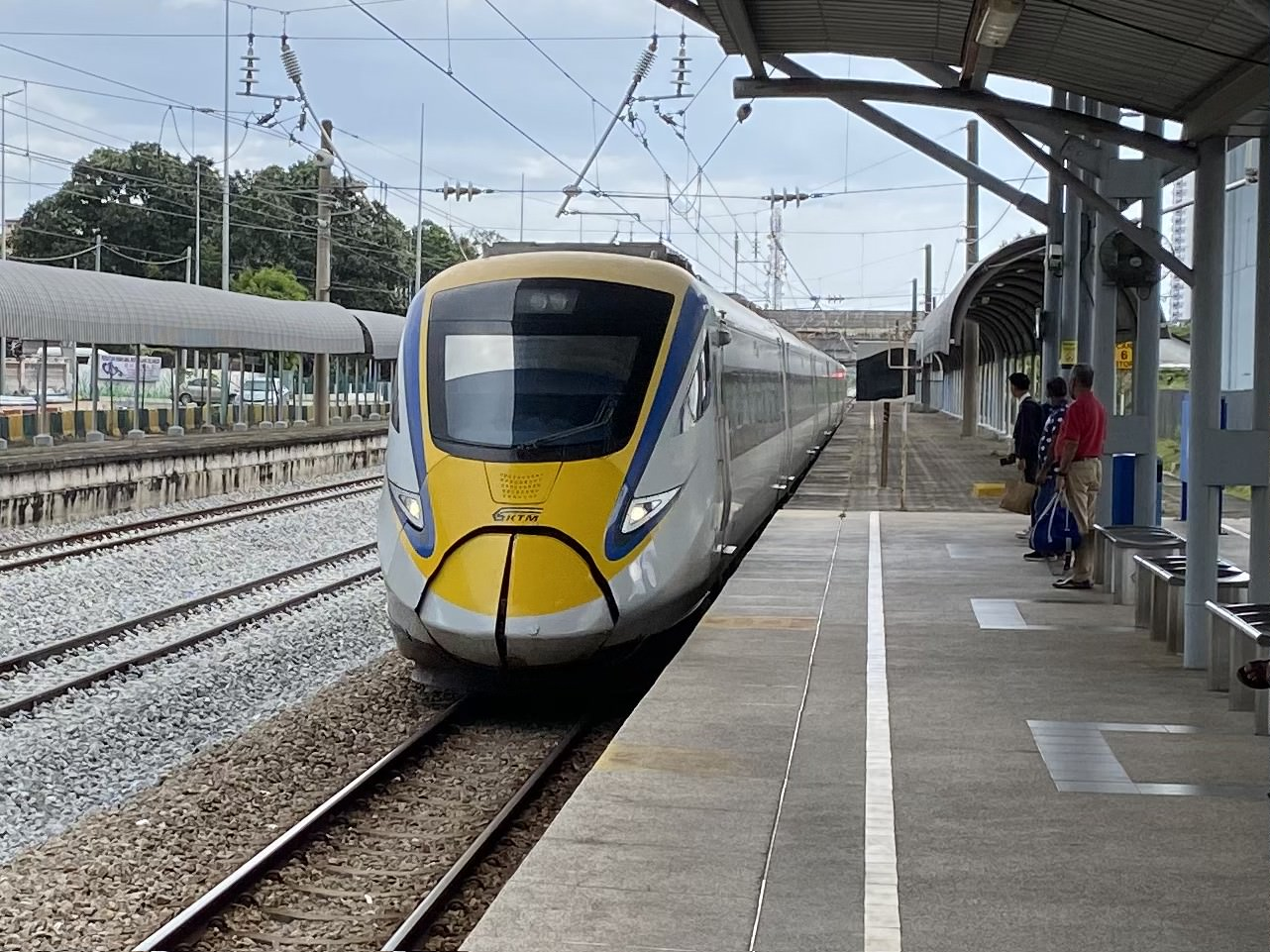
KTM ETS Class 93 arriving from the south

==== Elevated ====
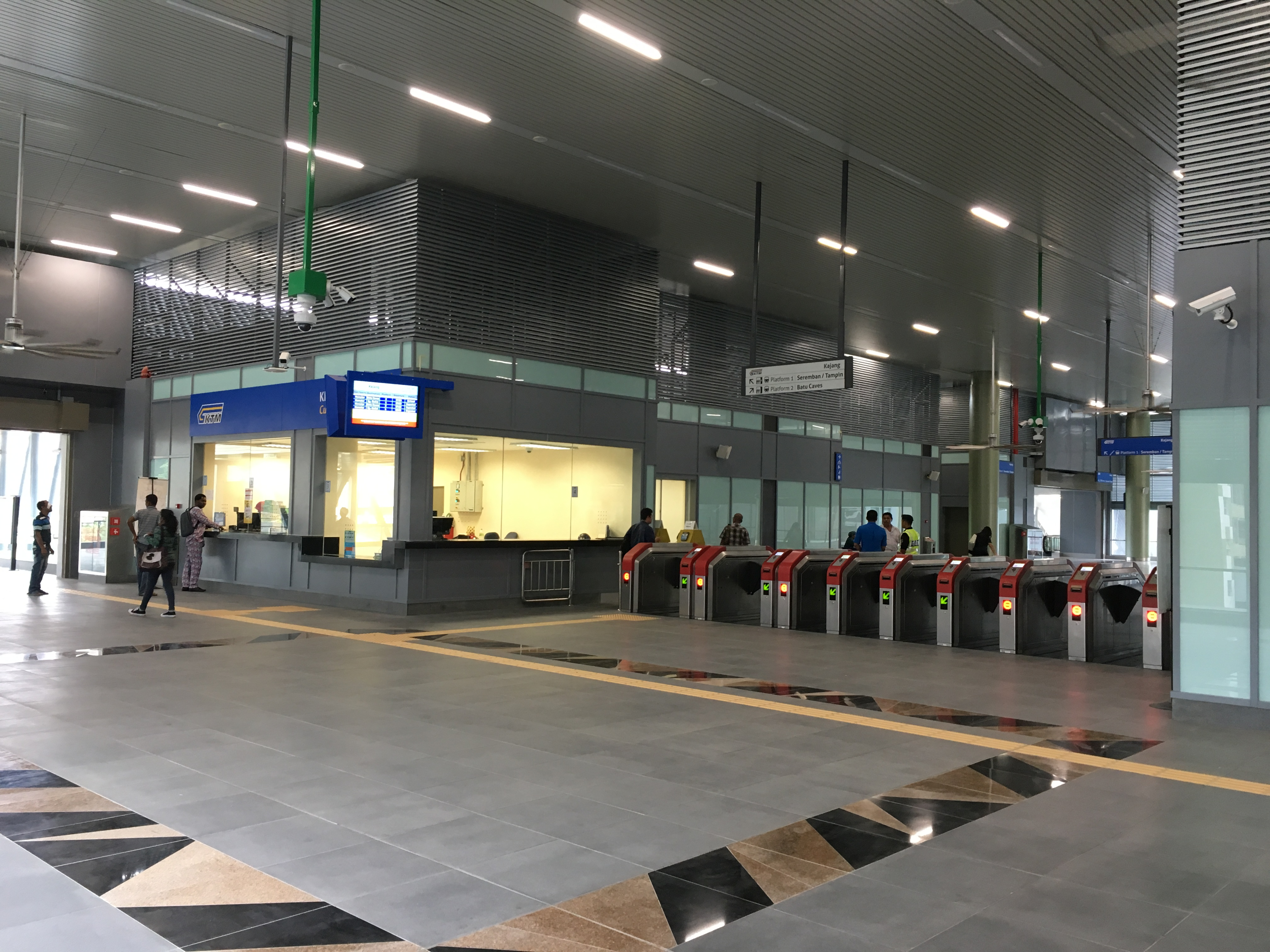
KTM customer service counter at the common concourse of the station

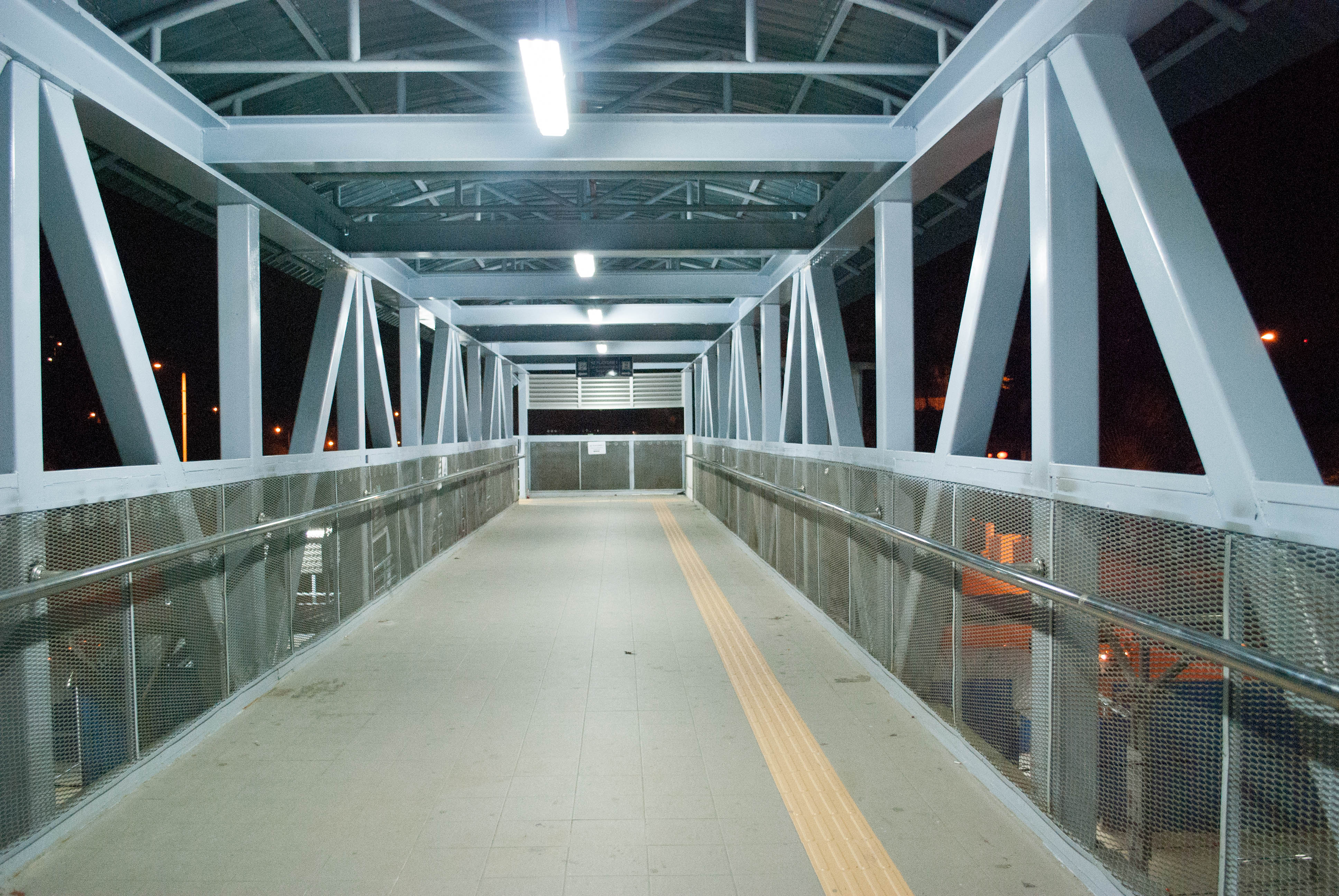
Overhead bridge replacing the old one

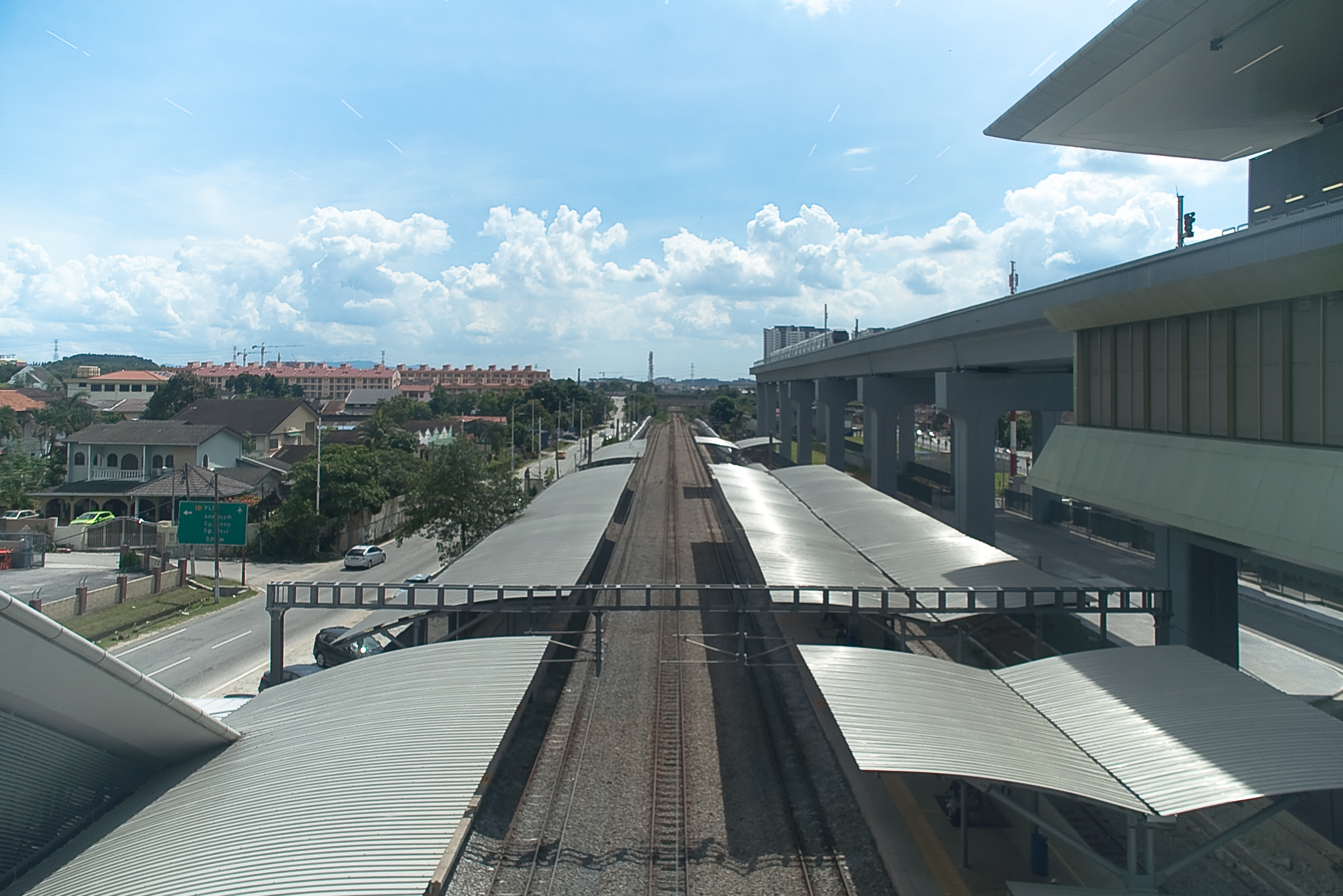
KTM railway tracks viewed from the concourse

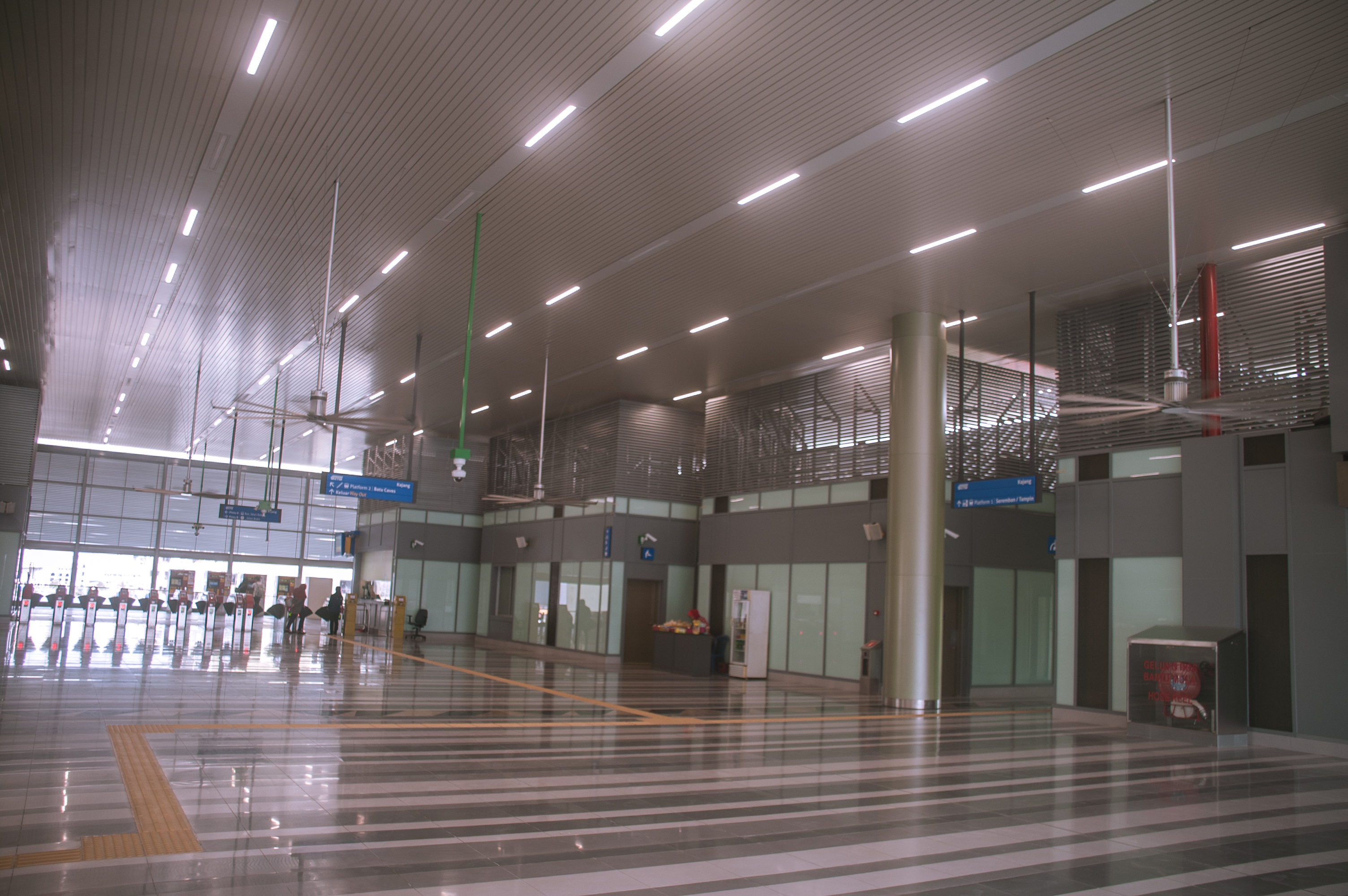
KTM paid area concourse

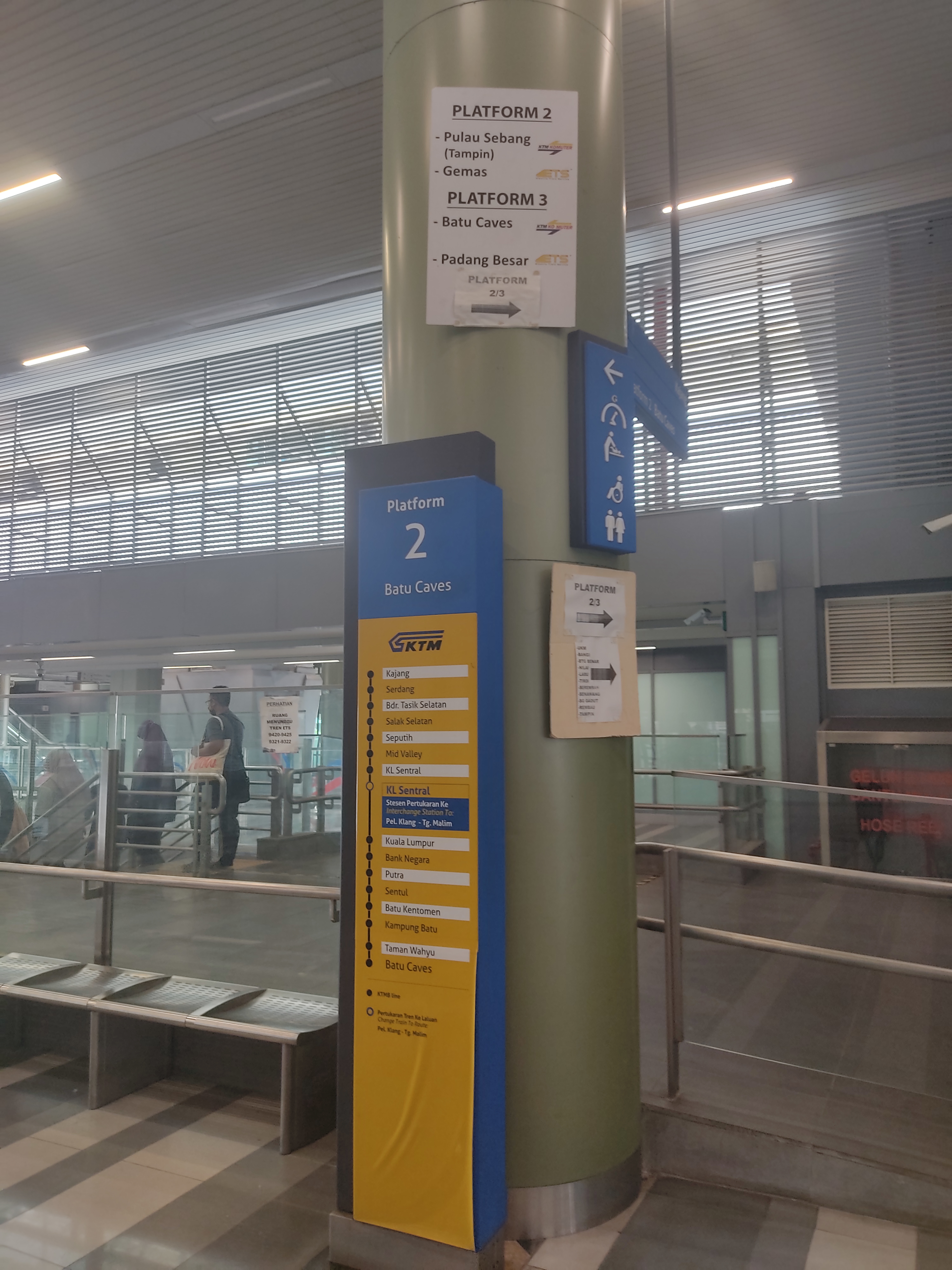
Signage to Platform 2 and 3 of the KTM station

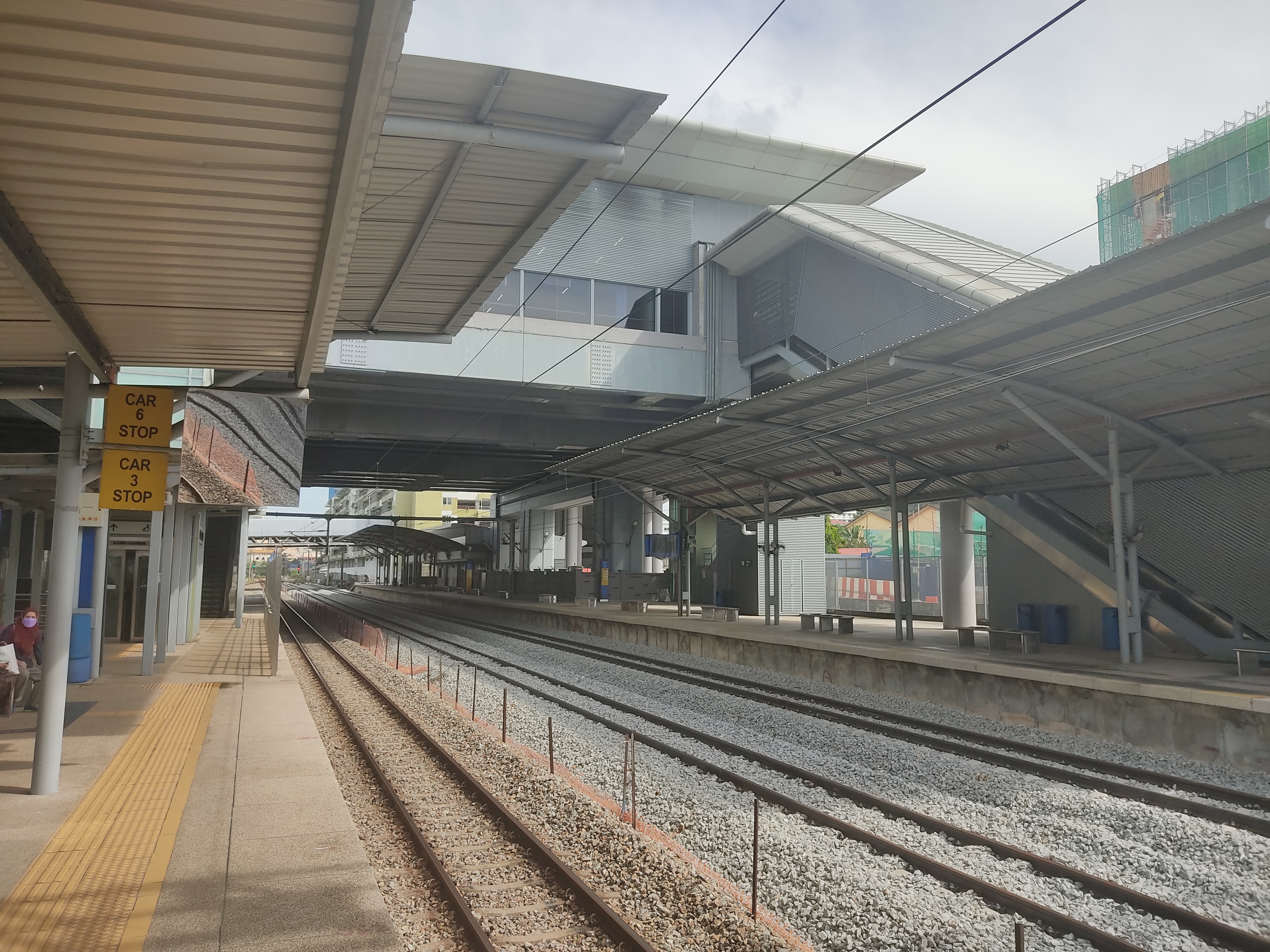
View from Platform 2 of the KTM station

=== MRT station ===
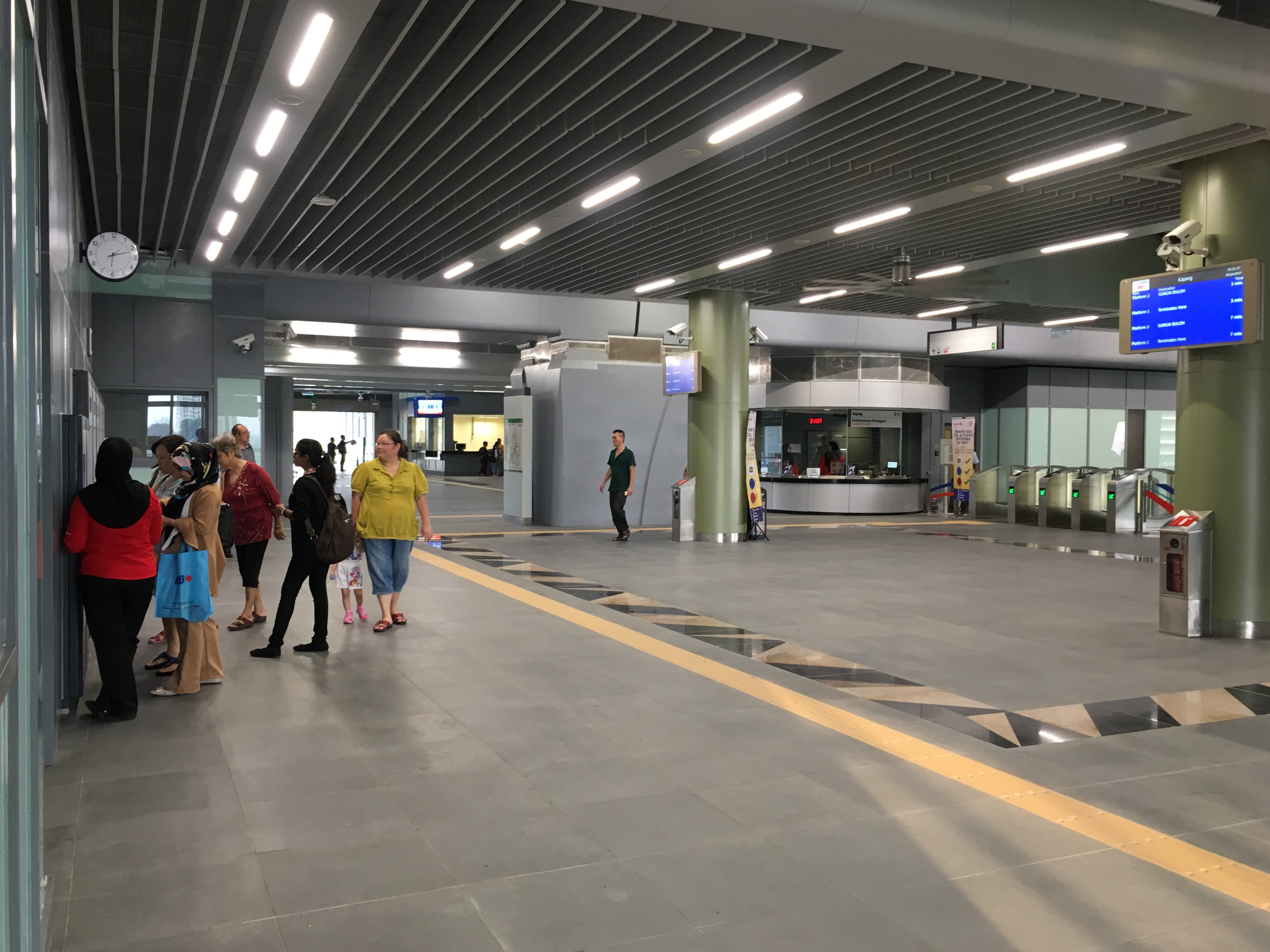
MRT area of the common concourse of the station

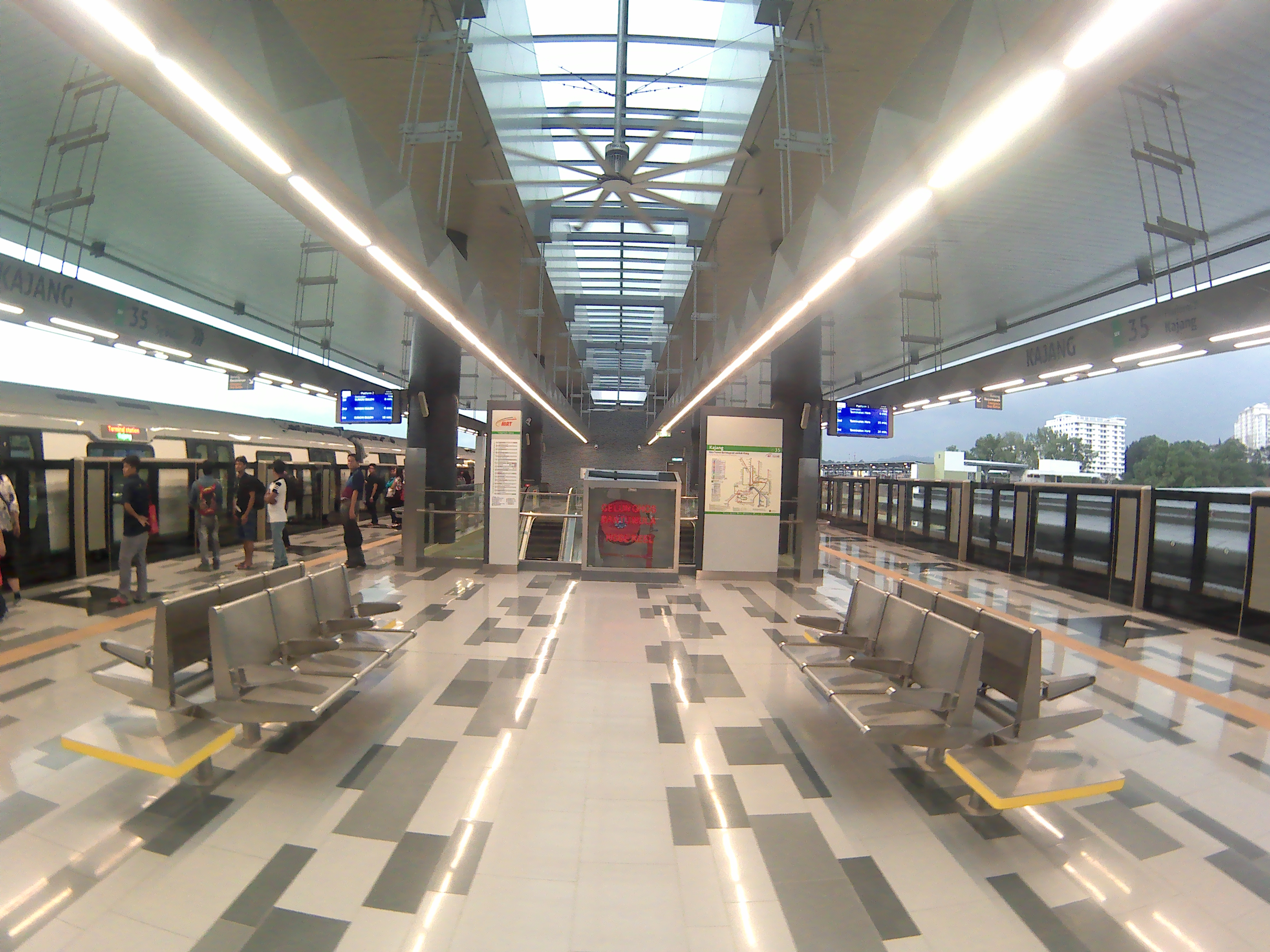
Platform level of the MRT station

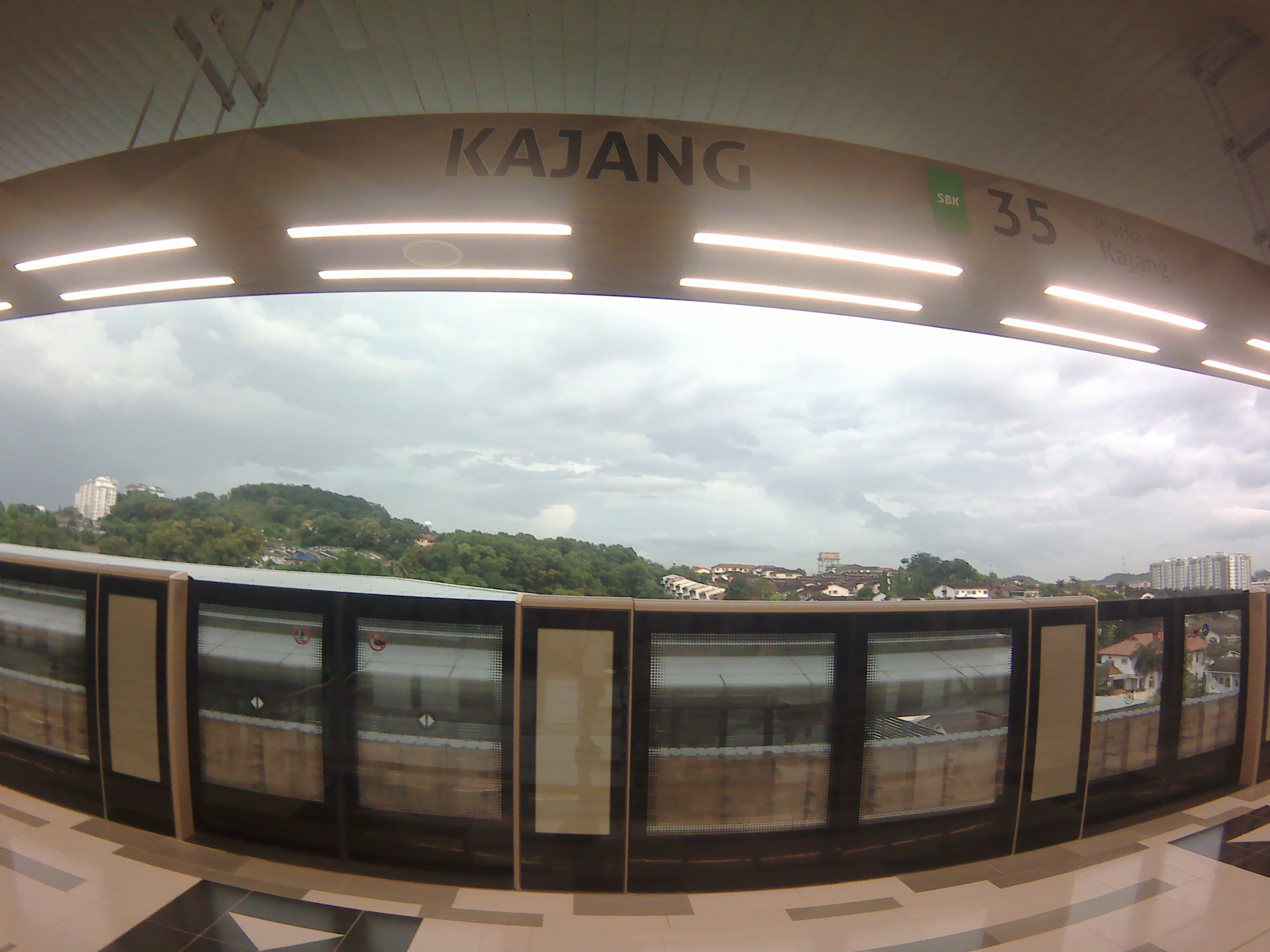
Skyline of Kajang seen from the station

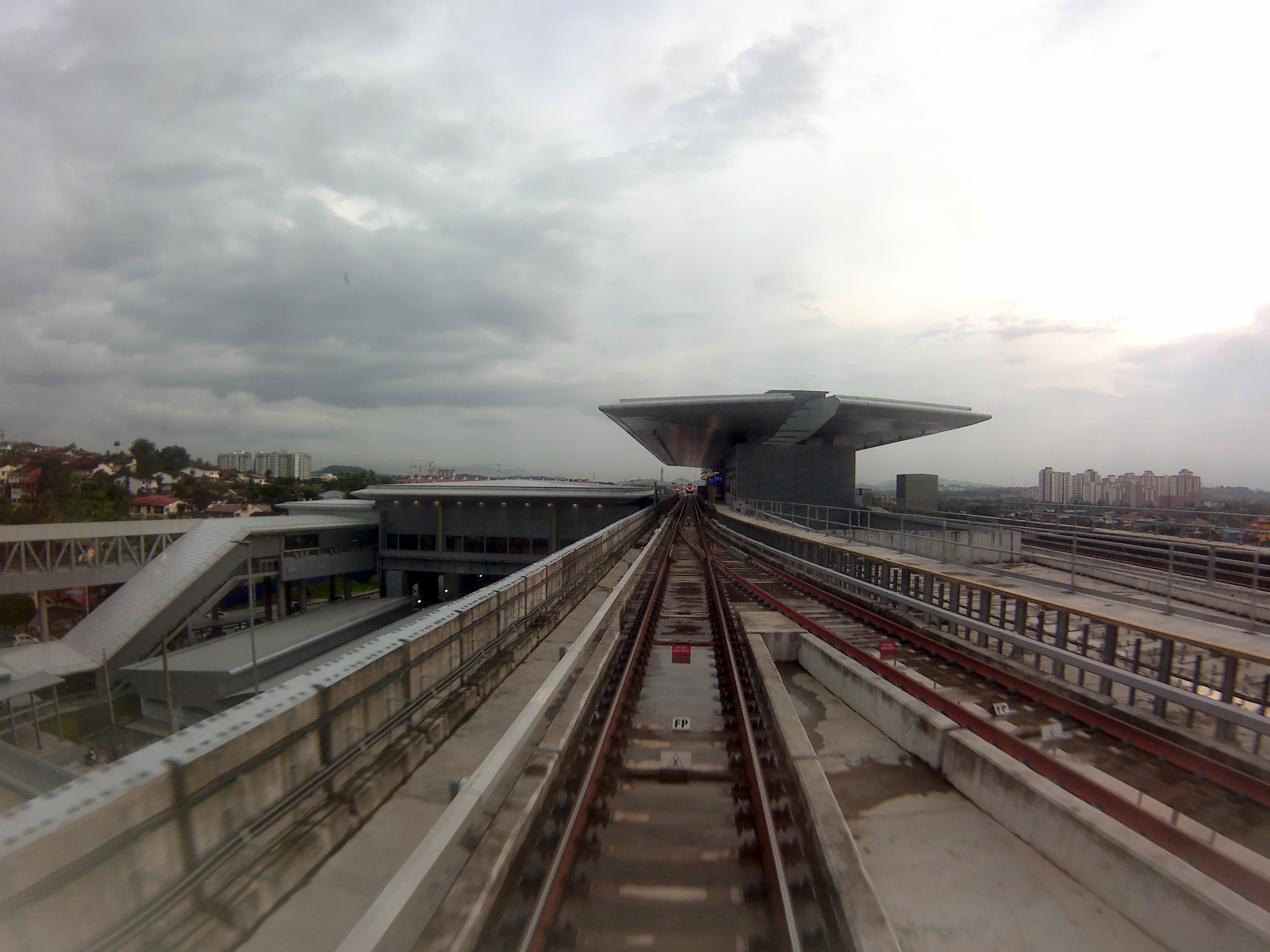
View of the MRT station from an approaching train

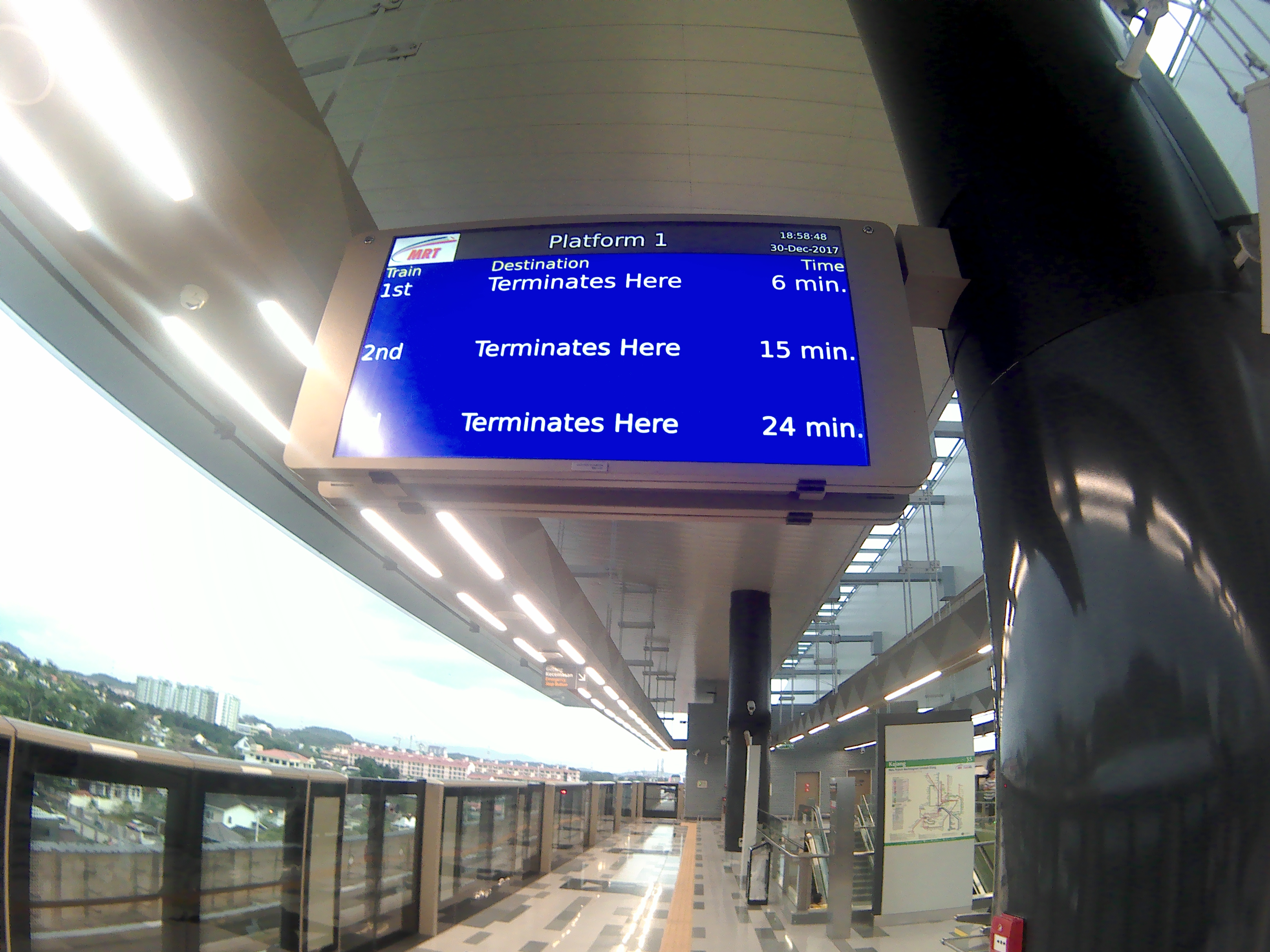
Train arrival information board at Platform 1

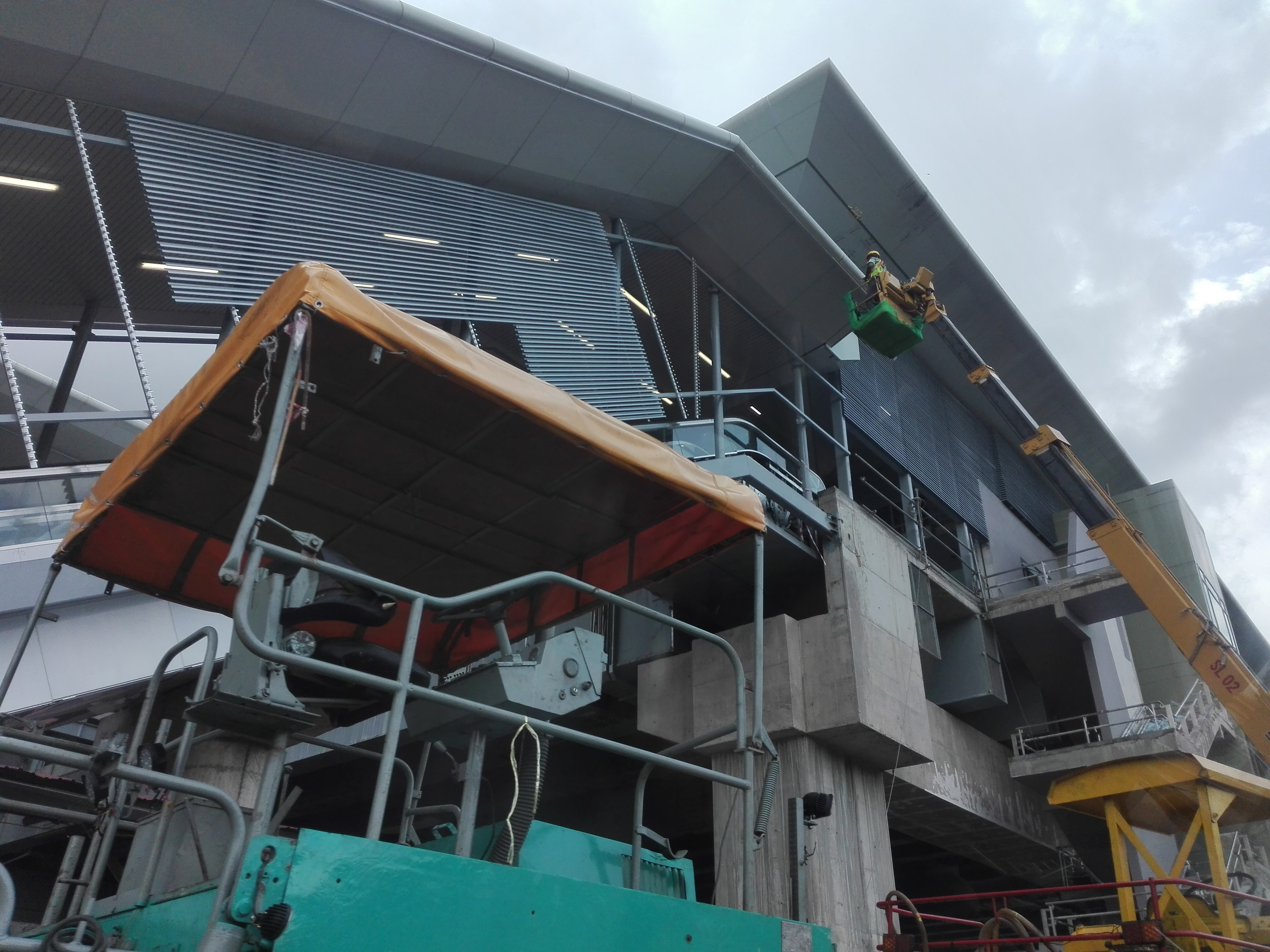
MRT station entrance being constructed in May 2017

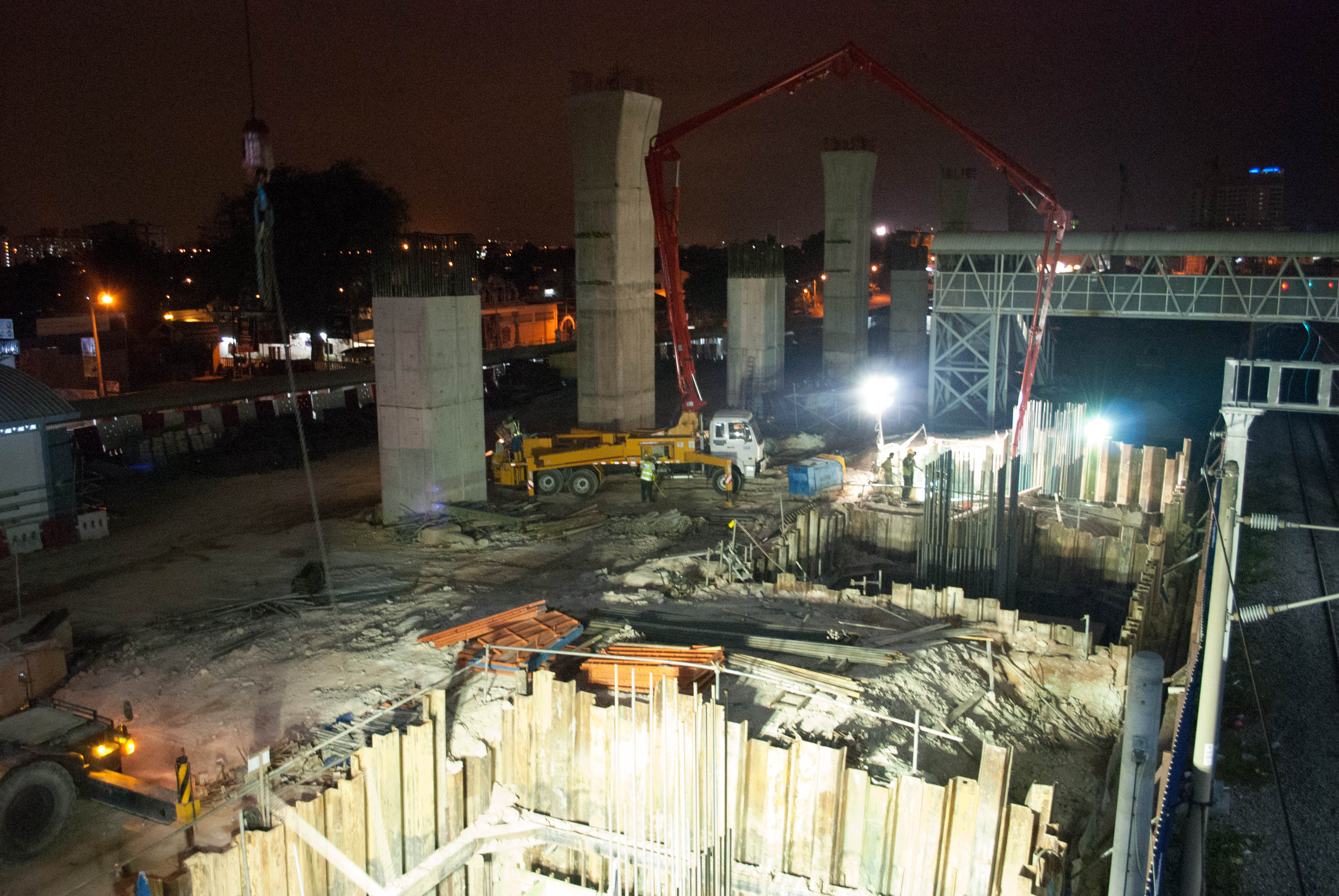
Construction as of July 2014

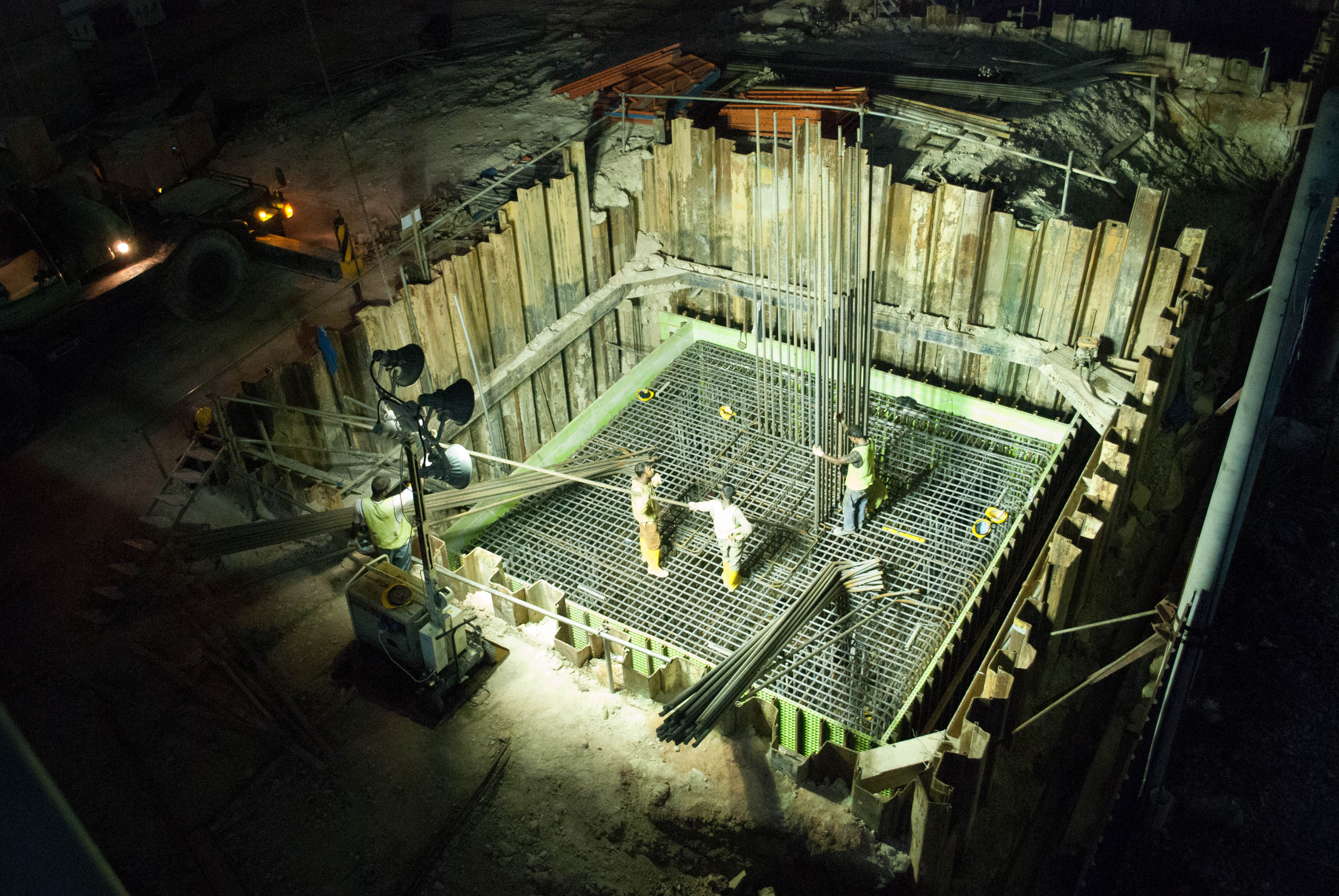
July 2014

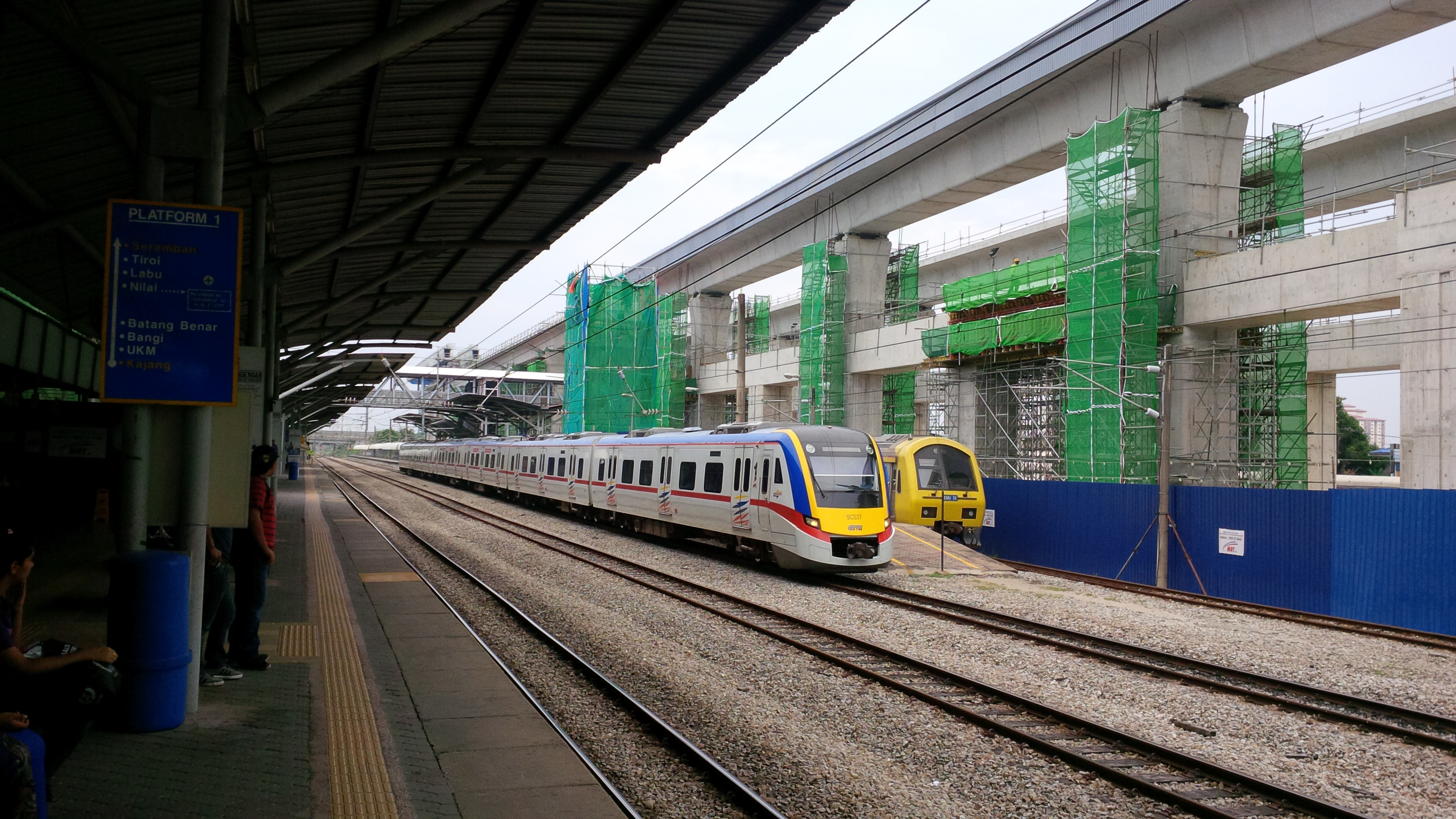
Construction as of July 2015

== Around the station ==
Nexus Kajang service apartment under construction that is located next to the station

- New Era University College
- SMK Jalan Bukit
- National University of Malaysia (UKM)

== See also ==
- List of rail transit stations in Klang Valley
