= Kajang 2 =

Township in Selangor, Malaysia

Coordinates: 2.9651990°N 101.7965688°E

Kajang 2 is a residential township in Kajang, Selangor, Malaysia.

== Background ==
Kajang 2 is located near Jalan Reko, opposite Seksyen 5 of Bandar Baru Bangi. The township is hence often considered a part of Bandar Baru Bangi. The area was developed by MKH Berhad. Kajang 2 is an integrated development designed to become the next central business district of Kajang. The town has infrastructure that is well-connected to the Kajang 2's own KTM commuter station, which is just one stop away from the Kajang MRT station (MRT Kajang Line). The township offers a range of facilities including integrated transit shopping malls, educational institutions such as Chinese primary and secondary schools, private and international schools, a city campus, a medical centre, a hotel tower, a corporate office tower, shop offices, and landed and high-rise residential properties. The township spans 530 acres (210 ha) and has an estimated gross development value (GDV) of RM5.7 billion.

== Access ==

The township is accessible via road from Kajang Dispersal Link Expressway (SILK) from Exit 1805A at Kajang Utama. The closest rail station is Kajang 2, situated at Jalan Reko.
