= Bandar Baru Bangi =

Coordinates: 2°57′12″N 101°46′00″E

- Town and District capital
- Location of Bandar Baru Bangi within Malaysia
- Bandar Baru Bangi within Malaysia
- Country: Malaysia
- State: Selangor
- District: Hulu Langat
- Established: 1974

Government
  - Body: Kajang Municipal Council
  - Councillor: Farhan Haziq Mohamed
  - Member of Parliament: Syahredzan Johan Democratic Action Party
- Time zone: UTC+8 (MST)
- Postcode: 43650
- Area code: +03-892

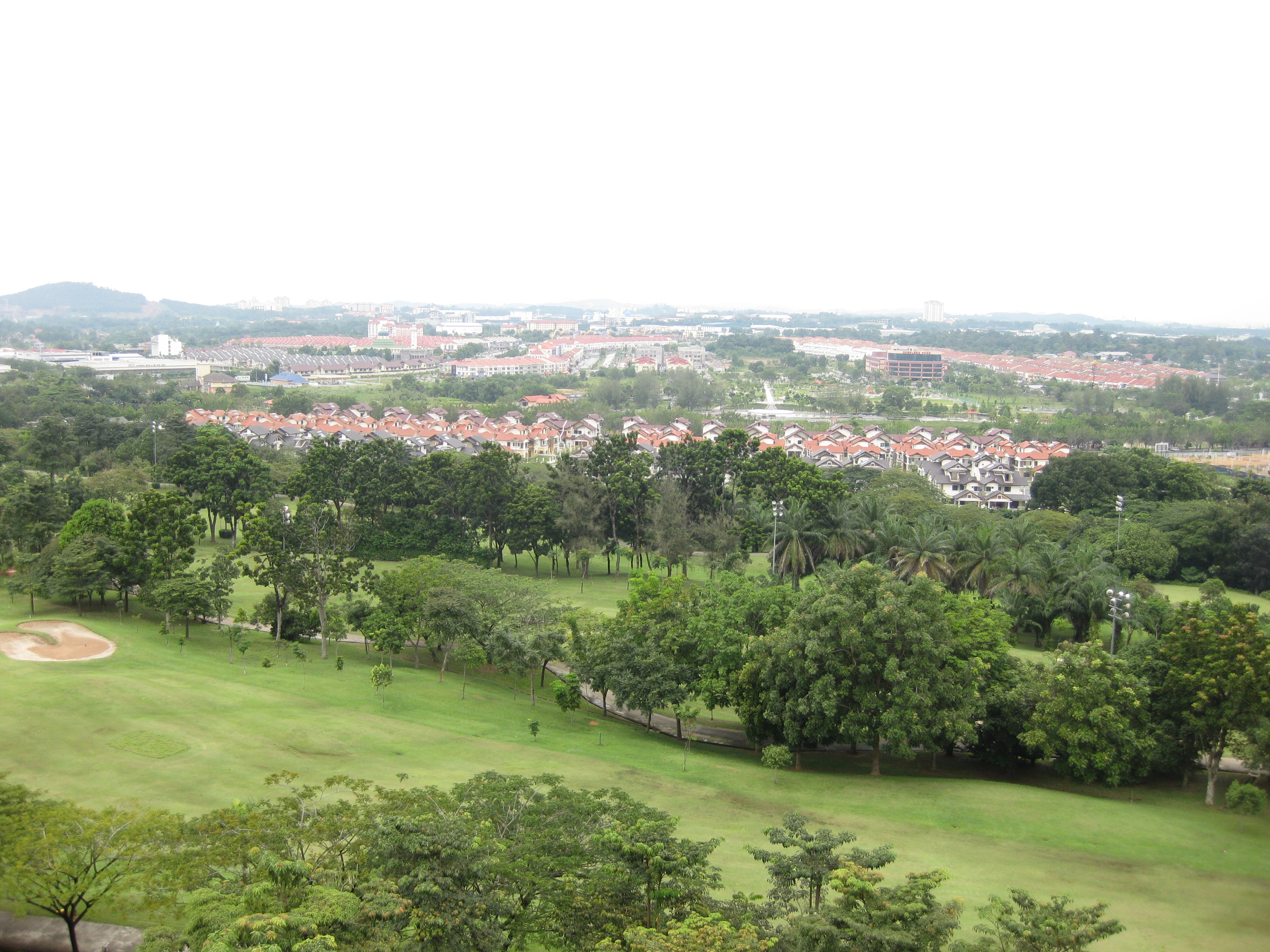
Bandar Baru Bangi circa 2009, as viewed from the Bangi Golf Resort.

Bandar Baru Bangi in Hulu Langat District

Bandar Baru Bangi lit. 'Bangi New Town' is a township and satellite town of Kajang situated in Hulu Langat District, in southeastern Selangor, Malaysia.

It is named after the small town of Bangi situated further south. It is located between Kajang and Putrajaya (formerly Prang Besar) and is about 25 km away from the capital city, Kuala Lumpur. Bandar Baru Bangi acts as the satellite town and Central Business District of Kajang, with most banks and government offices operating out of the township. Bandar Baru Bangi is also known as "Bandar Berilmu" or knowledgeable city since 2008 as numerous universities are located here including the National University of Malaysia.

The name of the town usually is abbreviated as "BBB". As of 2016, there are 16 town sections in the town. While not an official town section, the new township Kajang 2 is the latest extension to Bandar Baru Bangi due to its close proximity to Seksyen 5.

== Features ==
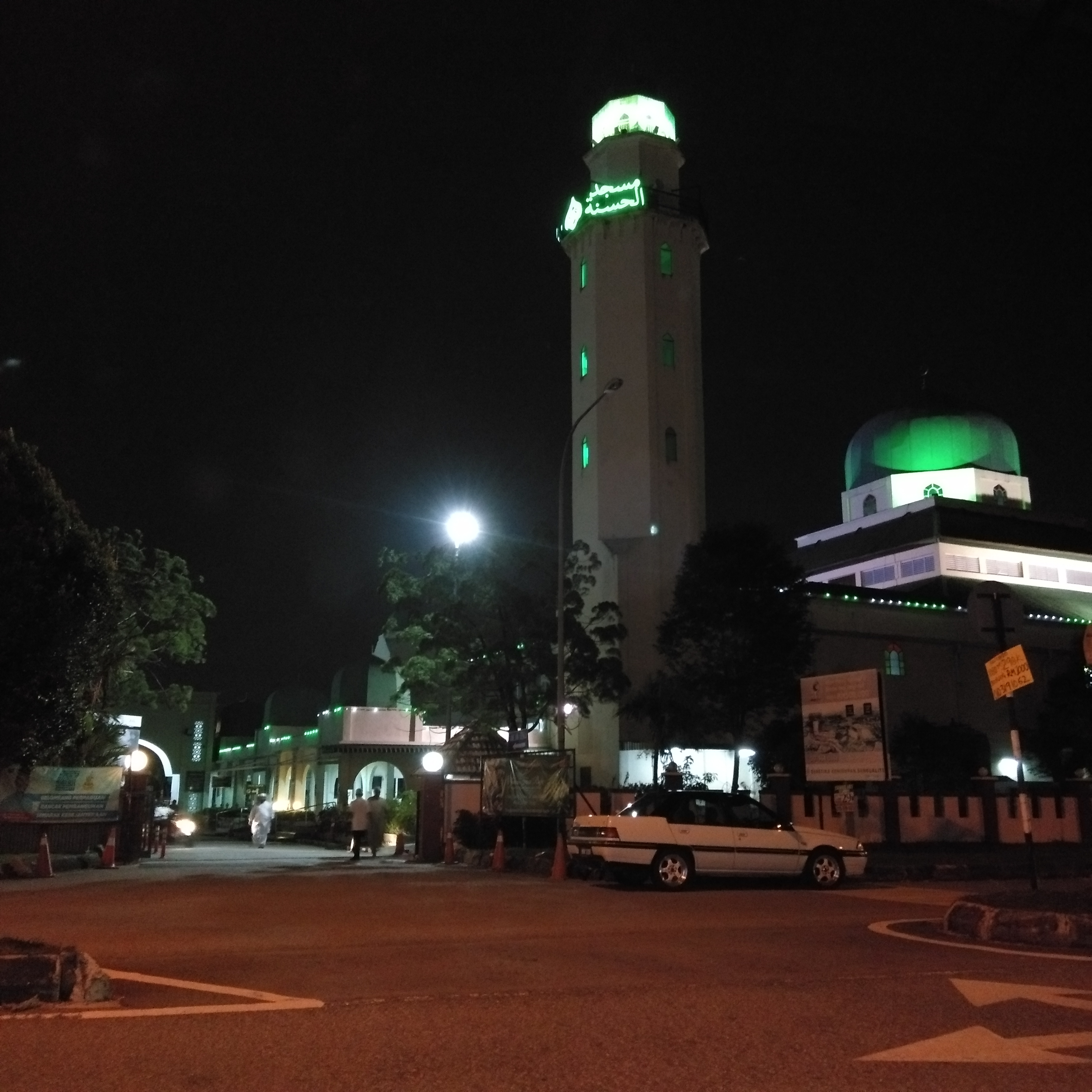
Masjid Hasanah

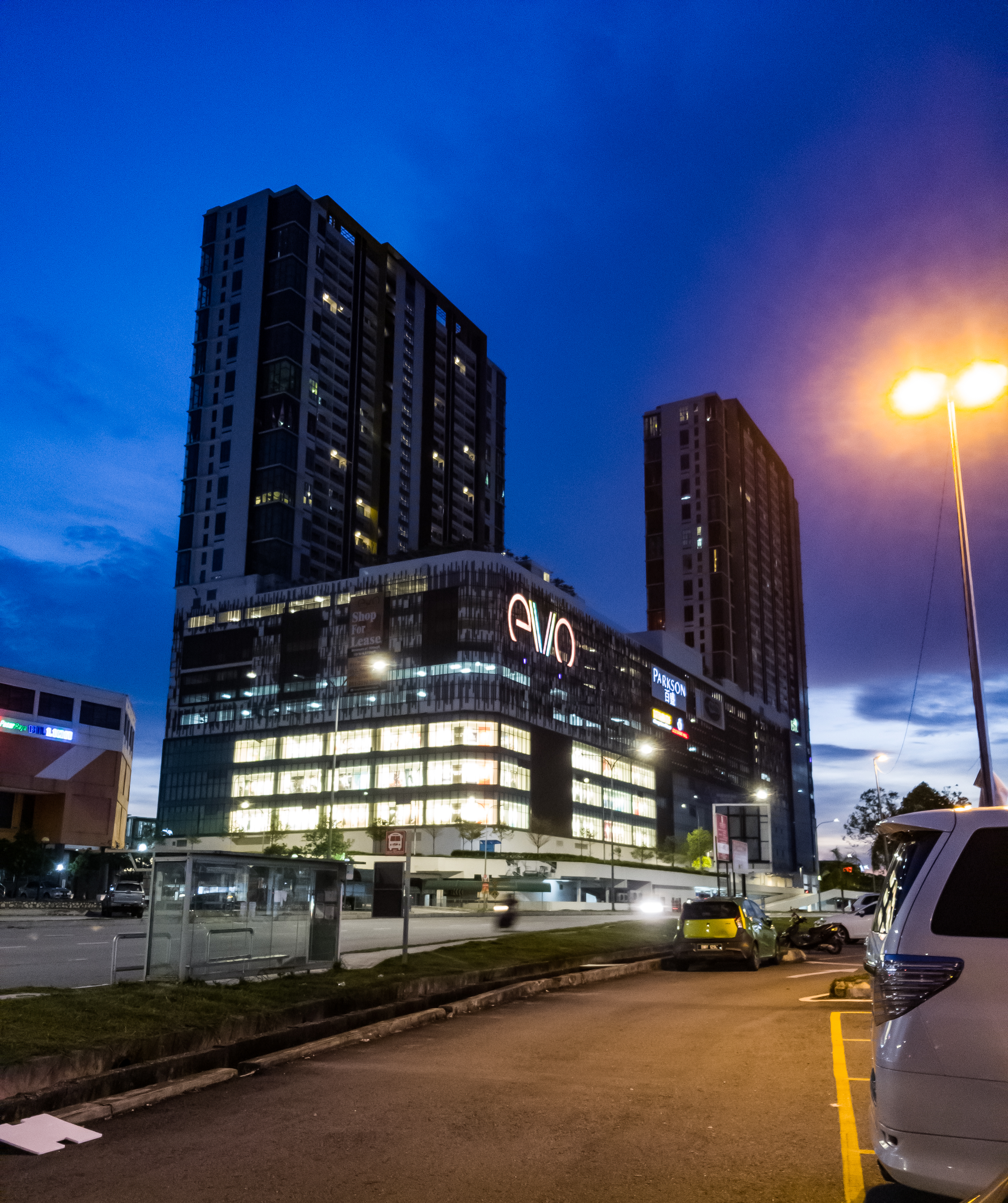
Evo Mall retail and residential complex in Bandar Baru Bangi.

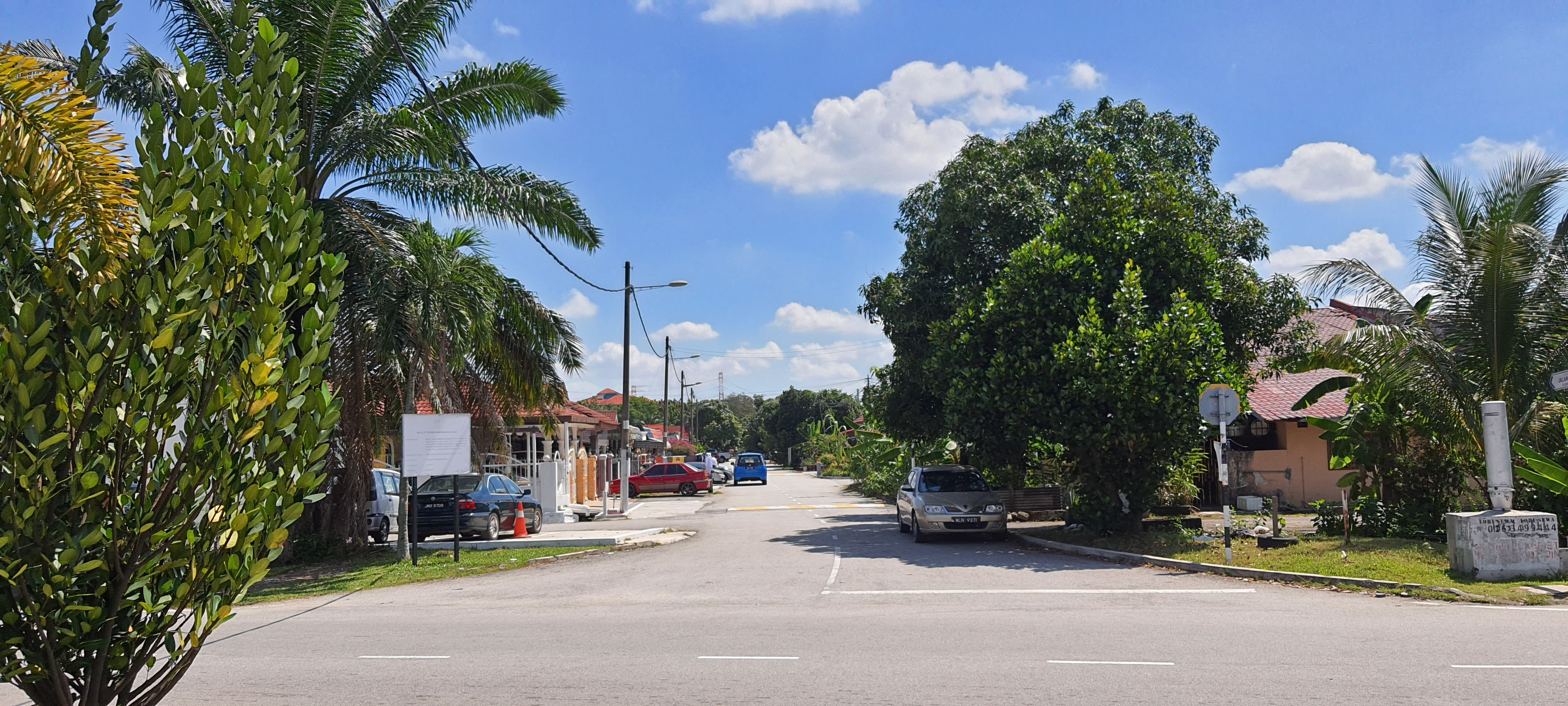
A residential neighborhood in Seksyen 1, Bandar Baru Bangi.

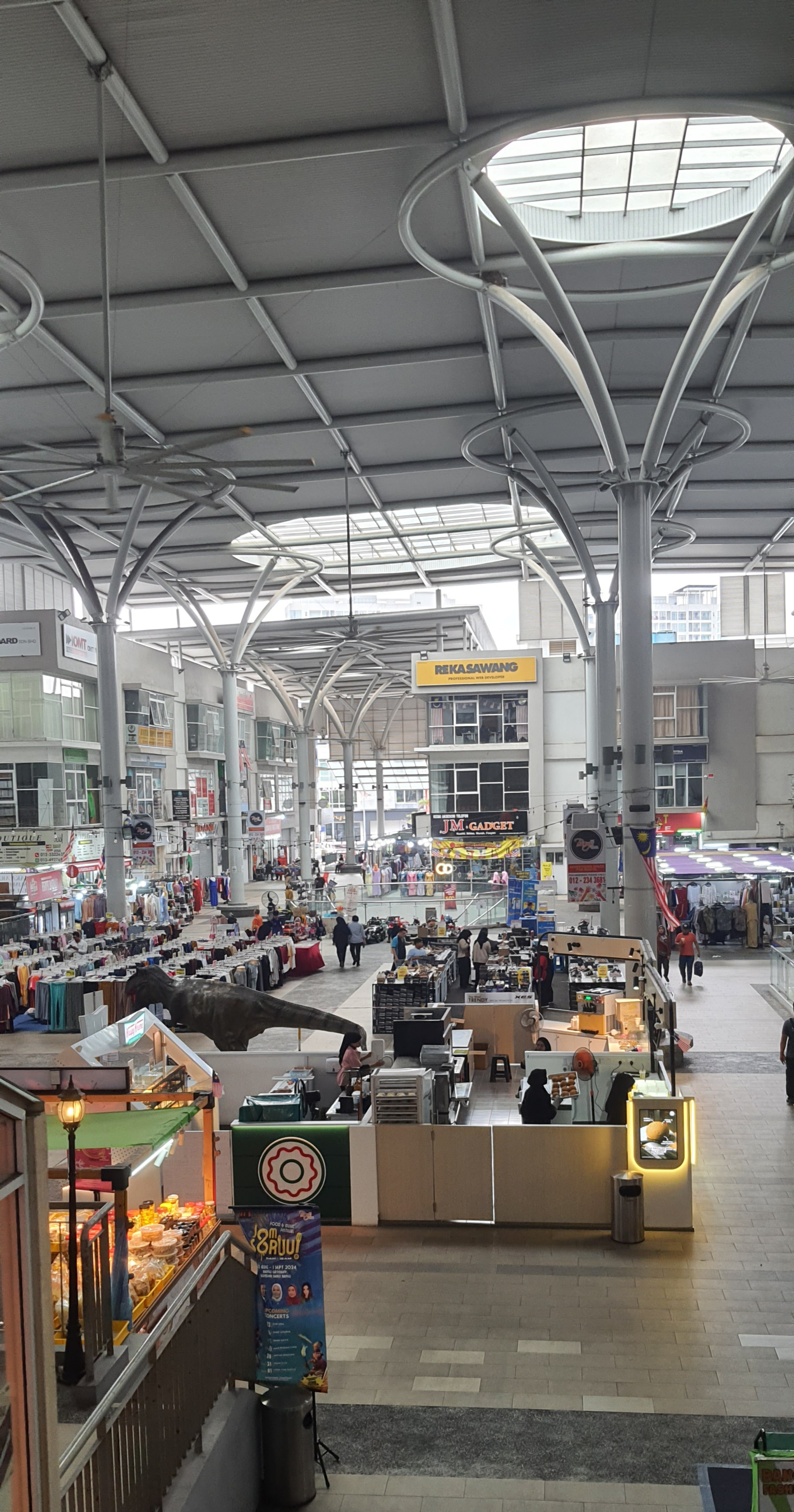
A shot of the central concourse of Bangi Gateway Mall.

External image
- Sections of Bandar Baru Bangi

Bandar Baru Bangi is also known as a "Knowledge Town" as it is home to Universiti Kebangsaan Malaysia (National University of Malaysia). Other public universities including Universiti Tenaga Nasional and Universiti Putra Malaysia (located in Serdang) are also nearby.

It is also famous for its eateries. There are mamak stalls, sea food, Malaysian, Thai, Arabic as well as Japanese restaurants. There are several night markets, supermarkets, malls, and hotels in the town. Bangi Golf resort situated near section 6 is one of the largest golf resorts in Selangor state. The Bandar Baru Bangi Town Centre was planned together with the detailed implementation planning and design together with the design for a proposed town park for PKNS by PDRc under the Project Management of Peter Verity the international architect and urbanist and is now acts the major commercial and recreational centre of Bandar Baru Bangi.

== Educational institutions ==
Private schools:

- Sekolah Rendah Islam Pintar Tahfiz
- Institut Pintar Tahfiz Fuqaha (secondary school)
- Sri Ayesha
- Seri ABIM
- Sekolah Islam Sri Al-Amin
- Sekolah Rendah Islam Tahfiz Ilmuwan
- Sekolah Rendah Integrasi Islam BangiKu

Primary schools:

- Sekolah Kebangsaan Bandar Baru Bangi
- Sekolah Kebangsaan Jalan 3 Bandar Baru Bangi
- Sekolah Kebangsaan Jalan 4 Bandar Baru Bangi
- Sekolah Kebangsaan Jalan 6 Bandar Baru Bangi
- Sekolah Kebangsaan Seksyen 7 Bandar Baru Bangi
- Sekolah Jenis Kebangsaan Tamil West Country
- Sekolah Rendah Agama Integrasi Bandar Baru Bangi

Secondary schools:

- Sekolah Menengah Kebangsaan Bandar Baru Bangi
- Sekolah Menengah Kebangsaan Jalan 3 Bandar Baru Bang
- Sekolah Menengah Kebangsaan Jalan 4 Bandar Baru Bangi
- Sekolah Menengah Kebangsaan Jalan Reko
- SMKA Maahad Hamidiah Kajang

Higher education:

- Universiti Kebangsaan Malaysia (UKM)
- Infrastructure University Kuala Lumpur (IUKL), formerly known as Kuala Lumpur Infrastructure University College (KLIUC)
- Kolej Poly-Tech Mara Bangi
- UniKL Malaysia-France Institute
- Universiti Tenaga Nasional
- Institut Pendidikan Guru

== Training centres ==
- Bangi Government and Private Training Centre Area
- Malaysian National Institute of Occupational Safety And Health
- Malaysian Tax Academy
- Judicial and Legal Training Institute (ILKAP)

== Research centres ==
- Malaysian Nuclear Agency (formerly known as Malaysia Institute of Nuclear Technology Research (MINT))
- Malaysian Palm Oil Board (MPOB)
- Malaysian Green Technology And Climate Change Corporation
- Malaysian Genome and Vaccine Institute

== Industry ==
- Sony
- Hitachi
- DENSO
- Pepsi

== Notable people ==
- Adnan bin Saidi
- Azmyl Yunor
- Datuk Dr Mohd Fadzillah Kamsah

== Transportation ==
=== Trains ===
The town are served by KTM UKM and KTM Kajang 2 stations under the KTM Seremban Line. UKM station is located at Persiaran KWSP which is 1 km away from UKM area while Kajang 2 station is located at the new Kajang 2 township opposite Seksyen 5, Bandar Baru Bangi.

=== Buses ===
The town is served by 4 routes from MRT Feeder Bus as well as 2 routes from Smart Selangor.

List of Feeder Buses that serves Bandar Baru Bangi
Route number	Terminus 1	Terminus 2	Serving Area in BBB	Operator	Began Operation
T451	KG34 MRT Stadium Kajang	UKM Bangi	UKM Bangi	MRT Corp (Operated by Rapid KL)	1 December 2017
T462	KG35 KB06 MRT/KTM Kajang	Seksyen 8 Bangi	Seksyen 7, 8, 9	MRT Corp (Operated by Rapid KL)	17 July 2017
T463	KG35 KB06 MRT/KTM Kajang	Seksyen 4 Bangi	Seksyen 4	MRT Corp (Operated by Rapid KL)	1 December 2017
T464	Seksyen 16 Bangi	KG35 KB06 MRT/KTM Kajang	Seksyen 1, 15, 16	MRT Corp (Operated by Rapid KL)	1 December 2017
KJ04	Hentian Kajang	PKNS Bandar Baru Bangi	Seksyen 1, 3, 4, 5, 8, 9, 16, Kajang 2	Smart Selangor (Operated by Rapid KL)	1 January 2022
