= Kajang 2 railway station =

Railway station in Selangor, Malaysia

Kajang 2

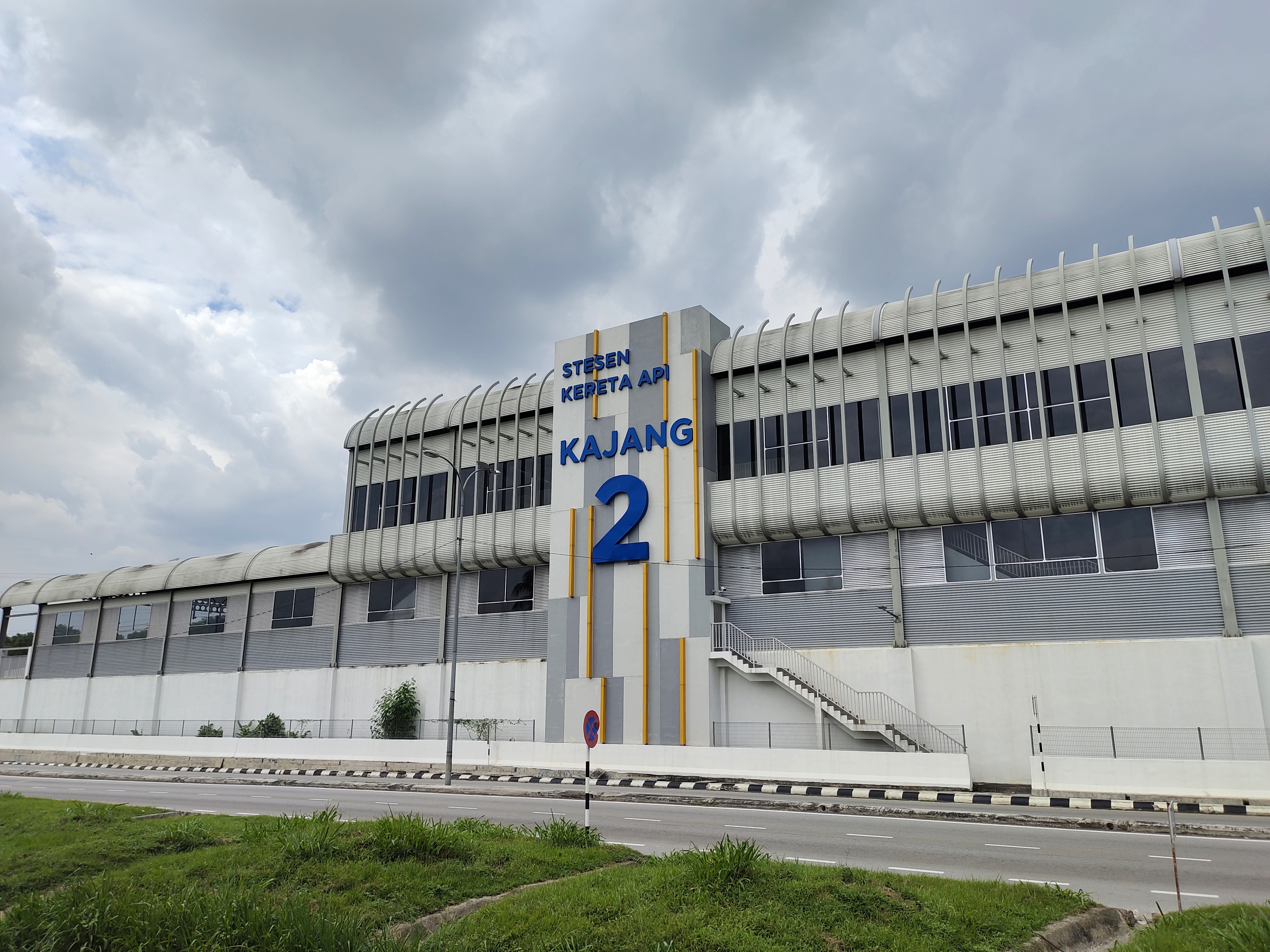
- Kajang 2 station

General information
- Other names: Malay: کاجڠ دوا (Jawi); Chinese: 加影新城; Tamil: காஜாங் 2
- Location: Kajang 2 / Bandar Baru Bangi, Kajang, Selangor, Malaysia.
- Coordinates: 2.96264°N 101.79207°E
- System: KB06A | Commuter rail station
- Owner: Railway Assets Corporation
- Operator: Keretapi Tanah Melayu
- Line: West Coast Line
- Platforms: 2 side platforms
- Tracks: 2
- Connections: Pedestrian bridge to Seksyen 5 Bandar Baru Bangi and walking distance to Terminal Kajang at Jalan Reko

Construction
- Structure type: At-grade
- Parking: Available. 500 parking bays (3 for disabled)
- Accessible: Yes

Other information
- Station code: KB06A

History
- Opened: 13 March 2023; 3 years ago

Services
Preceding station	Keretapi Tanah Melayu (Komuter)	Following station
Kajang towards Batu Caves	Batu Caves–Pulau Sebang Line	UKM towards Pulau Sebang/Tampin
Location

The Kajang 2 Railway station is a KTM Komuter infill train station located in Kajang 2, Bandar Baru Bangi, Kajang, Selangor. The station is on the KTM Komuter's Seremban Line.

== Station features and history ==
According to the Managing Director of the MKH Berhad, Tan Sri Eddy Chen Lok Loi, the company had purchased 275 acres (111 ha) of land in Kajang 2 as early as 2003 and had proposed to the government to jointly develop 14 acres (5.7 ha) of railway reserve land through a smart partnership model. The construction of this railway station is an in-kind contribution received by the Railway Assets Corporation (RAC) due to leasing the railway land to Srijang Kemajuan Sdn. Bhd. (SKSB) through a Development Cum Lease Agreement (DCLA) on October 12, 2012. The Cabinet approved this lease privatisation project on February 8, 2012, with a lease period from October 8, 2018, until October 7, 2078. MKH Berhad will be responsible for building a new railway station, which will be handed over to the Railway Assets Corporation as a public facility and operated by the Keretapi Tanah Melayu Berhad (KTMB) for commuter train services.

Eddy Chen also mentioned that the two-story Kajang 2 station is scheduled to be completed in March 2018. It is located between Kajang Station and the UKM station, near the Terminal Kajang and the Jalan Reko rail section. After the station is operational, passengers can take commuter trains to Kajang Station and transfer to the MRT Kajang Line to head north to Kuala Lumpur. The station's architectural design is by Swan & Maclaren Architects.。

This new train station was built to support the leading development of the 550 acres (220 ha) Kajang 2 new township by the local developer, MKH Berhad. MKH funded the construction of the station with RM33 million, and the entire development area covers 13 acres (5.3 ha). Additionally, two to three years after completion, the KTM Mall around the station will also be operational. As of 2017, the construction of the station has already been completed to 40%. The surrounding facilities of the Kajang 2 station include the Rafflesia International School, the Kajang 2 Chinese Primary School built by the company, and a proposed private hospital. The company expects an annual passenger rate of 550,000 people to use the new station. Before the station is operational, MKH has allocated 200 parking spaces on the nearby land for future use, and will combine the multi-storey car park that can accommodate 2,000 parking spaces with the future train station mall.

The station was completed in 2020, but due to the pandemic, it was delayed until now to be put into use. The construction cost of the station due to the pandemic-related factors, has exceeded the budget and reached RM70 million. The station has been operational since March 13, 2023, with 46 train services operating on weekdays and 33 train services operating on weekends and public holidays. The KTM Komuter operates on a current timetable, with a frequency of 30 minutes during peak hours and 60 minutes during off-peak hours.

The railway station covers an area of 2 acres (0.81 ha) and is equipped with various facilities, including parking for 500 vehicles, a pedestrian overpass, four escalators, facilities for the disabled, eight retail kiosks ready for rent, security surveillance cameras, a passenger drop-off area, and other basic facilities such as toilets, surau, and covered platforms. Two accessible lifts equivalent to three-storey in height will be installed at both ends of the pedestrian bridge. The parking area will be operated by Srijang Kemajuan Sdn. Bhd. with a maximum fee of RM5.50 per day. There is another pre-set parking lot with 200 parking spaces located outside the station, which will be open in the future. In order to encourage nearby residents to use the new train station, the parking fee for the first month of opening will be free.

Eddy Chen also mentioned that pedestrian walkways in the residential areas of Kajang 2 will be connected to the train station, and a pedestrian overpass will be built across the railway tracks and Jalan Reko to Bandar Baru Bangi Section 5, allowing pedestrians to walk along a 600-meter shoulder path to the Terminal Kajang, thus realizing the concept of a public transportation hub. Therefore, this is not only convenient for residents of the new township, but also benefits the public.

== Bus Services ==
Rapid KL trunk route 450 (Kajang - Lebuh Pudu), MRT Feeder Bus routes T451 (Stadium Kajang - UKM), T464 (Stadium Kajang - Teras Jernang) and Smart Selangor KJ04 (Kajang - Bandar Baru Bangi) serves the station at Jalan Reko's Plaza Perabot bus stop.

== Gallery ==
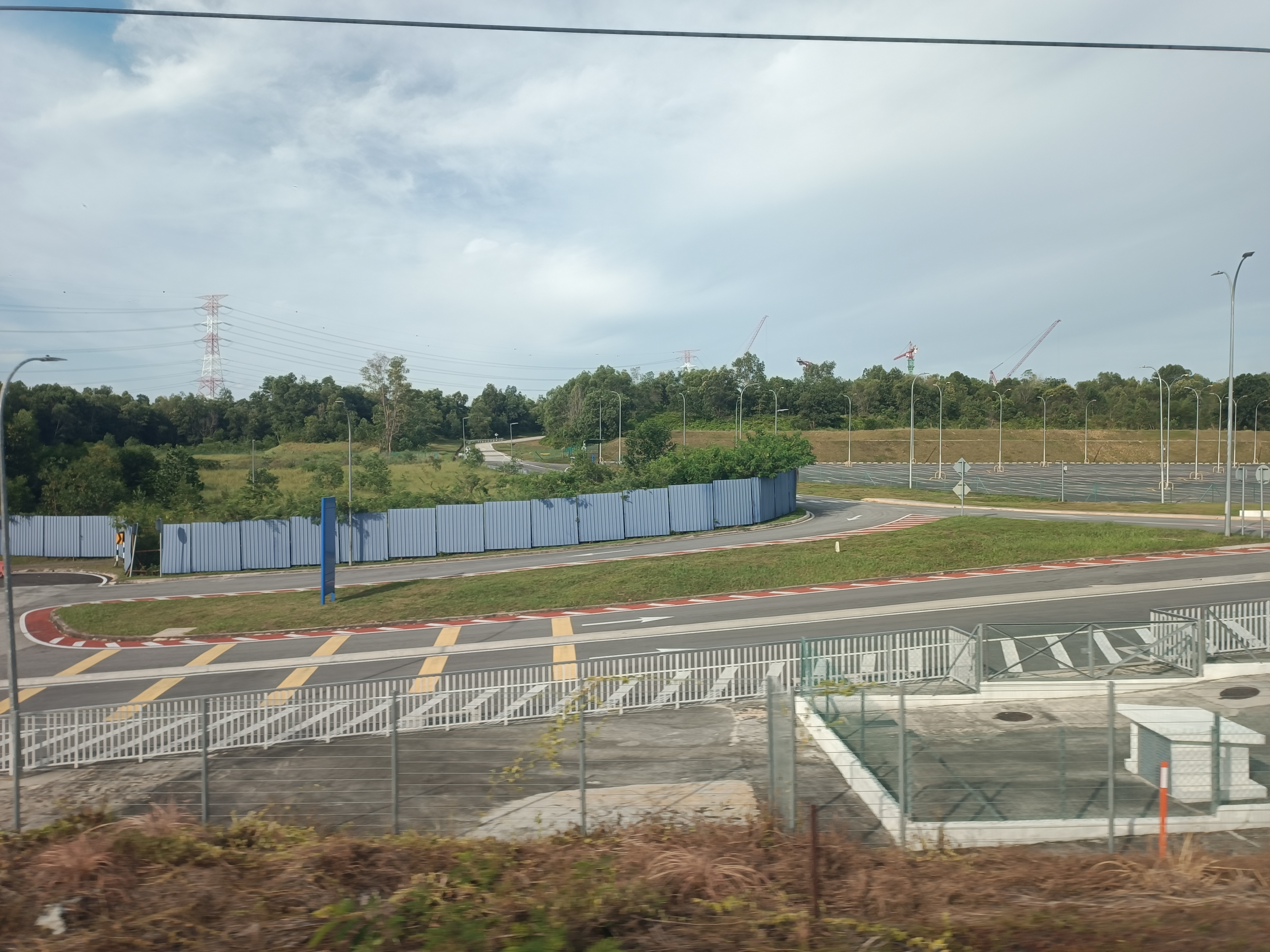
Open parking of the station

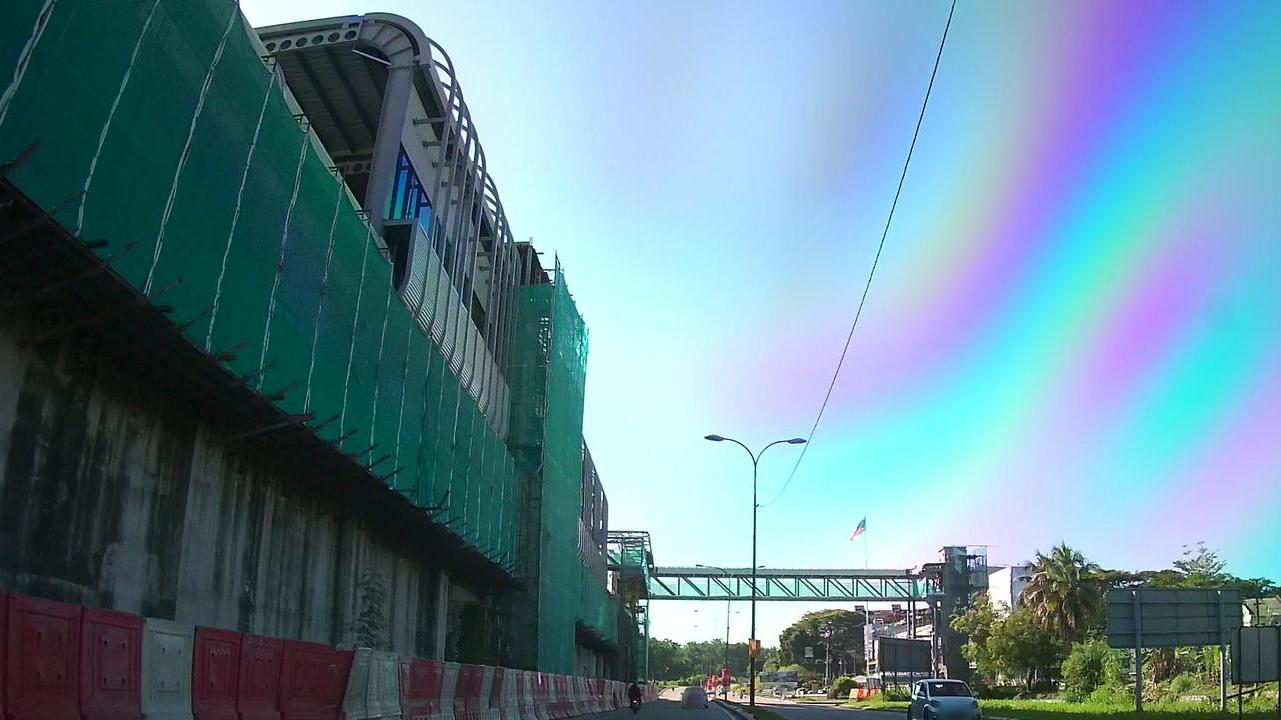
Kajang 2 railway station in 2020

Kajang 2 Railway Station during the opening

Kajang 2 platforms
