= UKM Komuter station =

Railway station in Selangor, Malaysia

UKM

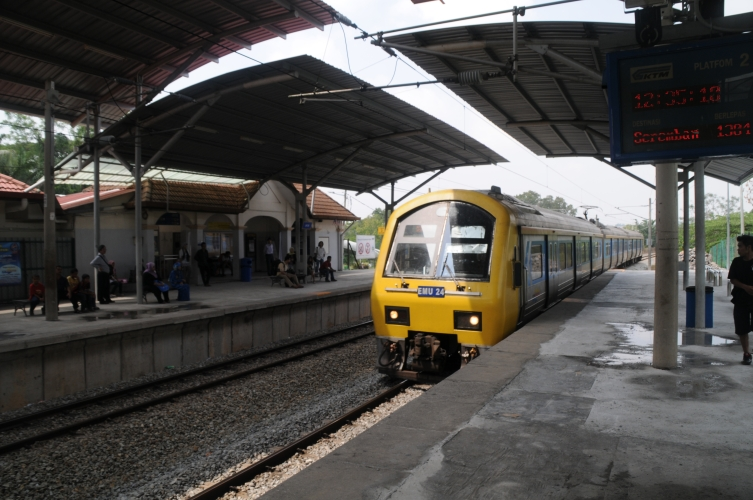
- Class 83 EMUs arriving at UKM KTM Komuter station

General information
- Other names: Malay: اونيۏرسيتي کبڠساءن مليسيا (Jawi); Chinese: 马来西亚国立大学; Tamil: மலேசிய தேசிய பல்கலைக்கழகம்
- Location: Jalan Sg Tangkas/Bangi, off Jalan Reko, Selangor, Malaysia.
- Coordinates: 2°56′22″N 101°47′16″E
- System: KB07 | Commuter rail station
- Owner: Railway Assets Corporation
- Operator: Keretapi Tanah Melayu
- Line: West Coast Line
- Platforms: 2 side platforms
- Tracks: 2

Construction
- Structure type: At-grade
- Parking: Yes
- Accessible: Yes

Other information
- Station code: KB07

History
- Opened: 1995

Services
Preceding station	Keretapi Tanah Melayu (Komuter)	Following station
Kajang 2 towards Batu Caves	Batu Caves–Pulau Sebang Line	Bangi towards Pulau Sebang/Tampin
Location

UKM Komuter station is a KTM Komuter train station situated close to and named after the National University of Malaysia (Malay: Universiti Kebangsaan Malaysia, UKM) in Bangi, Hulu Langat District, Selangor, Malaysia.

The station is a small two-platform train halt served by the KTM Komuter Seremban Line train services, with an operational ticket counter and two ticket vending machines. The station has seen the addition of a new extension to the building.

The station halt is located on the northeast tip of the university's grounds, 1.5 km from the university's academics compound. The university's club house (with an 18-hole golf course and a swimming pool) and driving range are located immediately close to the station. Bus services are provided to carry passengers between the station and the university.

Because of its location close to the National University, the station typically receives many passengers (mostly university students) on Fridays and during the weekends.
