= Malaysia Federal Route 3210 =

Road in Malaysia

Federal Route 3210
- Jalan Kawasan Perindustrian Hulu Langat

Route information
- Maintained by Malaysian Public Works Department
- Length: 17.6 km (10.9 mi)

Major junctions
- Southwest end: Cheras; Pekan Batu Sembilan (Bt-9)
- B19 State Route B19; B62 State Route B62; B116 State Route B116; FT 1 Federal Route 1
- Northeast end: Hulu Langat; Pekan Batu Empat Belas (Bt-14)

Location
- Country: Malaysia
- Primary destinations: Kuala Lumpur, Hulu Langat (Pekan Batu Empat Belas (Bt-14)), Dusun Tua, Sungai Congkak, Sungai Gabai, Semenyih Dam, Semenyih

Highway system
- Highways in Malaysia; Expressways; Federal; State

Federal Route 3210, Jalan Kawasan Perindustrian Hulu Langat, is an industrial federal roads in Selangor, Malaysia. This 17.6 kilometres (10.9 mi) industrial federal road connects Pekan Batu Sembilan (Bt-9) Cheras in the southwest to Hulu Langat in the east.

== Route background ==
The Kilometre Zero is located at Pekan Batu Sembilan (Bt-9) Cheras.

== Features ==
At most sections, the Federal Route 3210 was built under the JKR R5 road standard, allowing maximum speed limit of up to 90 km/h (56 mph).

There is one overlap: B52 State Route B52 (from Pekan Batu Sembilan (Bt-9) Cheras town centre to Langat Dam).

== Junction lists ==
The entire route is located in Hulu Langat District, Selangor.

Legend:

- I/C - Interchange, I/S - Intersection, RSA - Rest and service area, OBR - Overhead bridge restaurant, R/R - Restaurant and rest plaza, L/B - Layby, V/P - Vista point, TN - tunnel, T/P - Toll plaza, BR - Bridge
- C - Cloverleaf, S - Stack, T-A - Trumpet-A, T-B - Trumpet-B, DT - Directional-T/Y, SDT - Semi-Directional-T/Y, P-Y - Partial-Y, D - Diamond, P-C - Partial cloverleaf, D-D - Diverging diamond, D-R - Direct ramp

Location	km	mi	Name	Destinations	Notes
Cheras	0.0	0.0	Cheras; Pekan Batu Sembilan (Bt-9)	Cheras–Kajang Expressway / FT 1 – Cheras, Kuala Lumpur, Taman Sri Cheras, Bandar Tun Hussein Onn, Kajang, Seremban	T-junctions
Cheras			Sungai Sering bridge		
Cheras			Kampung Bukit Paya		
Cheras			Kampung Sungai Serai		
Cheras			Sungai Long quarry mines	Sungai Long quarry mines	T-junctions
Cheras			Taman Sri Nanding	Jalan Cempaka 2 – Taman Desa Raya; Jalan Sri Nanding – Taman Sri Nanding	Junctions
Cheras			Taman Impian		
Hulu Langat	10.0	6.2	Hulu Langat; Pekan Batu Empat Belas (Bt-14)	B62 Selangor State Route B62 – Ampang, Kuala Lumpur, Kuala Lumpur Look Out Point Tourist Complex; B116 Selangor State Route B116 – Sungai Tekali, Semenyih Dam, Semenyih	Junctions
Hulu Langat			Hulu Langat–Langat Dam see also B52 Jalan Hulu Langat		
1.000 mi = 1.609 km; 1.000 km = 0.621 mi: Concurrency terminus
