= East Klang Valley Expressway =

Turnpike in Malaysia

Expressway 27
- East Klang Valley Expressway; Lebuhraya Lembah Klang Timur 东巴生谷大道
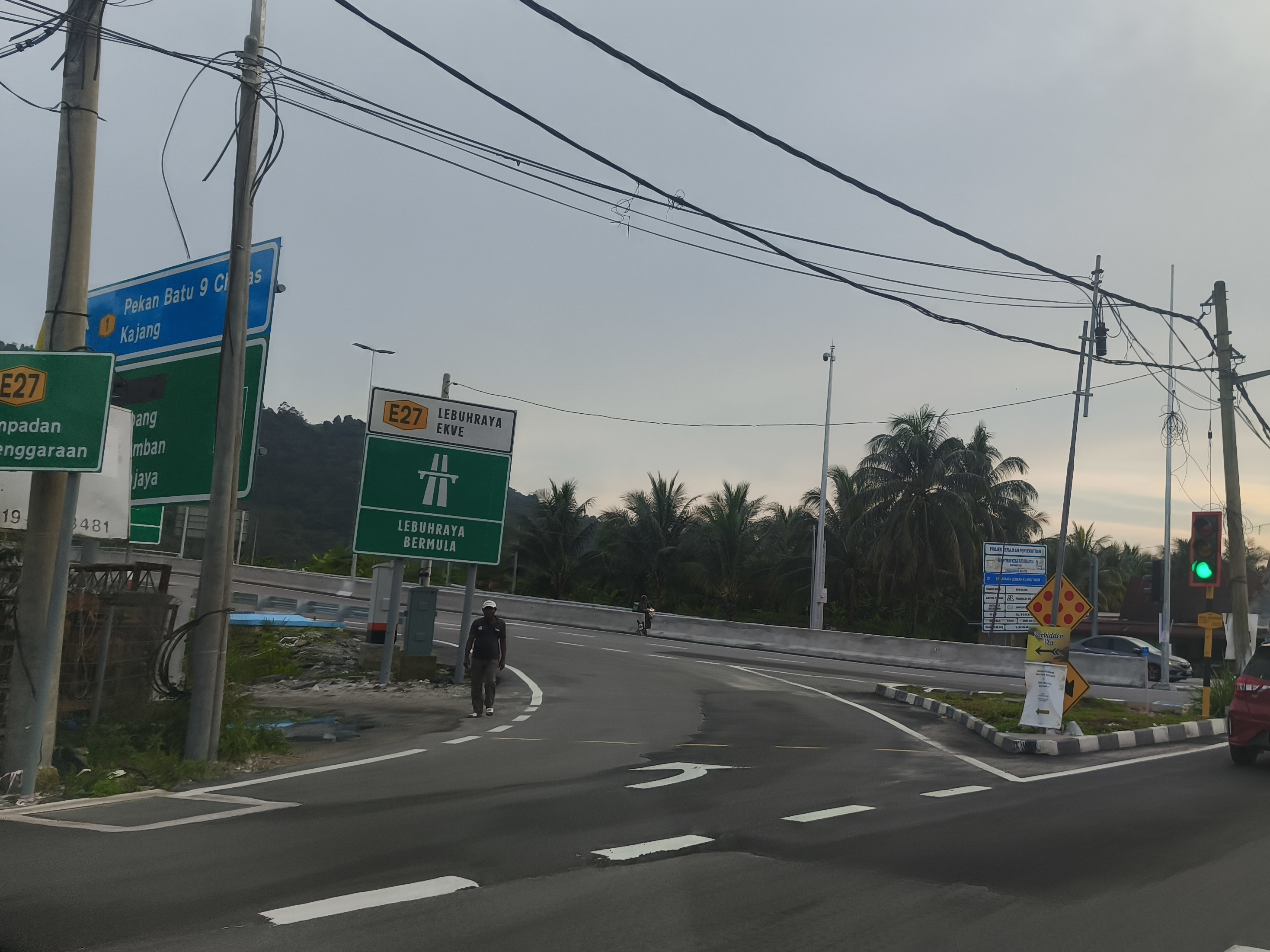
- EKVE Junction at Hulu Langat

Route information
- Maintained by EKVE Sdn Bhd
- Length: 39.5 km (24.5 mi)
- Existed: 2015–present
- History: Opened in stages 30 August 2025: Phase 1A (Sungai Long Interchange to Ampang Interchange); 2026: Phase 1B (Ukay Perdana Interchange)

Major junctions
- North end: Jalan Ukay Perdana; FT 28 Kuala Lumpur Middle Ring Road 2 (MRR2)
- Jalan Lembah Jaya; B52 Jalan Hulu Langat; Persiaran Mahkota Cheras 1
- South end: Kajang Dispersal Link Expressway

Location
- Country: Malaysia
- Primary destinations: Gombak, Ulu Klang, Ampang, Hulu Langat, Cheras, Kajang

Highway system
- Highways in Malaysia; Expressways; Federal; State

The E27 East Klang Valley Expressway, EKVE, Kuala Lumpur North Dispersal Expressway (KL NODE) or Kuala Lumpur Outer Ring Road (KLORR) is an expressway in Klang Valley, Malaysia. The 39.5-kilometre-long (24.5 mi) expressway will connect Ukay Perdana in Ampang, Selangor and Bandar Sungai Long in Kajang. This expressway is part of the Kuala Lumpur Outer Ring Road (KLORR). The construction of the expressway began on 1 September 2015. Once completed, the expressway is expected to benefit 140,000 motorists per day.

The phase 1 of the expressway, from Sungai Long to Ampang, stretches 24.1 km and costs MYR 1.55 billion.

== Route background ==
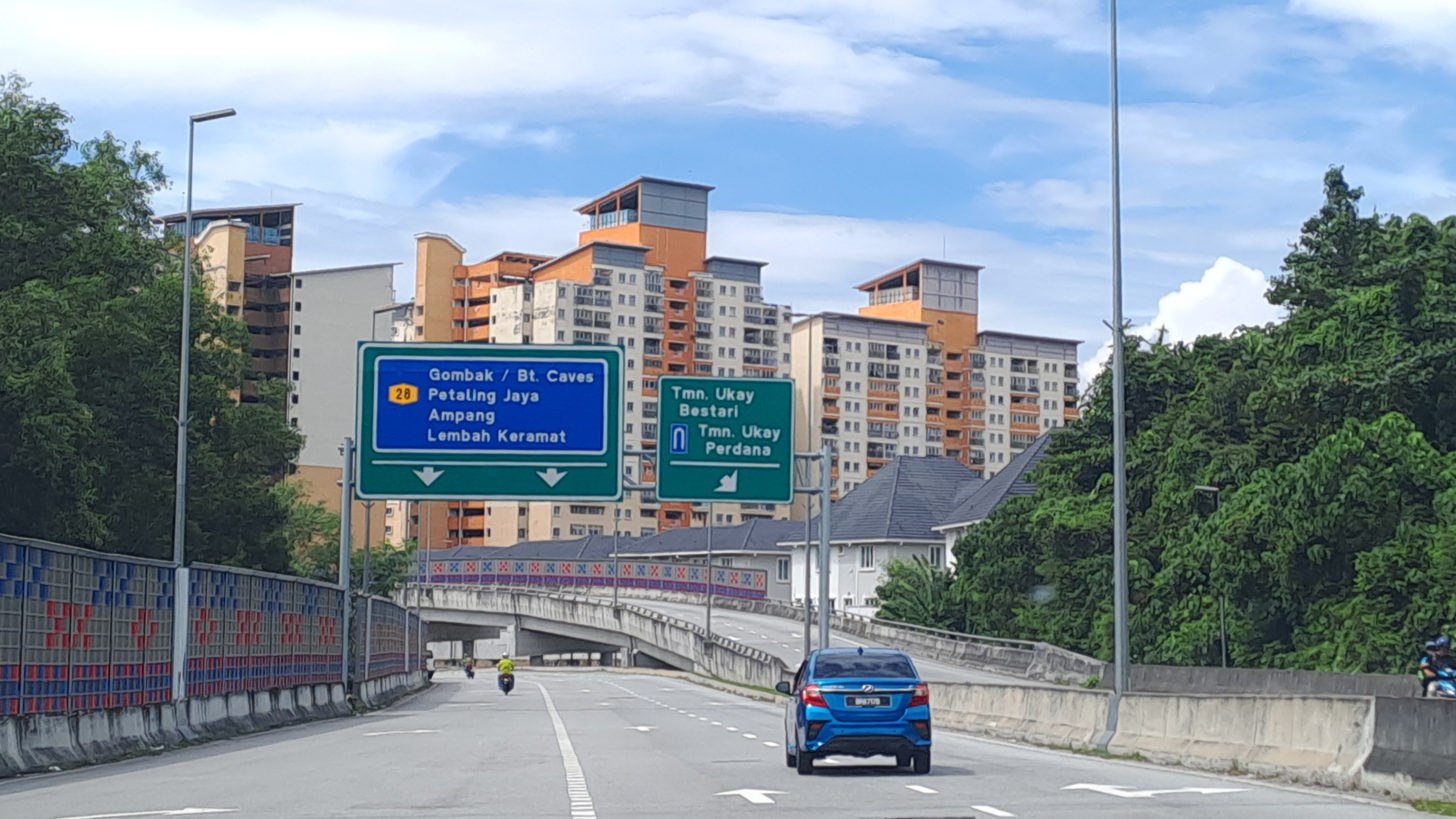
View of East Klang Valley Expressway in Ukay Perdana, Selangor

The expressways for phase 1 starts from its interchange with the Kuala Lumpur Middle Ring Road 2 in Ukay Perdana (north), Ulu Klang, before running southwards through Ampang, Hulu Langat, Bandar Mahkota Cheras and emptying into the SILK toll road in Sungai Long just outside Kajang (south).

It is built to link areas in southern Greater Kuala Lumpur like Seremban, Kajang, Semenyih and Putrajaya to the East Coast Expressway (and vice versa) which is a gateway to the east coast areas of Peninsular Malaysia while bypassing the congested Jalan Cheras (part of FT1) and the FT28 MRR2.

== History ==
EKVE Sdn Bhd (a member of Ahmad Zaki Resources Berhad (AZRB)), the developer of the expressway, was expected to begin construction of the RM 1.55 billion project in September 2015. Originally the project was expected to be completed by 2019, but a series of delays in the project meant that, in October 2020, the completion target was revised to be completed by the third quarter of 2021.

As of November 2021, the project was 94.48% complete, and was expected to be completed by the end of 2022. However, due to several lawsuit against EKVE Sdn Bhd involving a piece of land at Beverly Heights, the completion of the highway was delayed to 2023 as announced by then Minister of Works, Fadillah Yusof in October 2022. Since then, the highway would be opened in sub-stages, with the Sungai Long-Ampang stretch being the first sub-stage to be opened in the second quarter of 2023. The expected completion and opening were further delayed to 2024, when then new Minister of Works Alexander Nanta Linggi stated in a written parliamentary reply in March 2023 that the delay was caused by halting of works due to rising costs of construction. Alexander also said that the completion of works percentage was revised to 91%. In July 2024, Selangor State EXCO for public infrastructure and agriculture, Izham Hashim stated in a Selangor State Legislative Assembly session, that progress for EKVE was 89.13% complete, and was expected to fully operational by 31 December 2025, a further revision from Alexander's statement in 2023. Bangi's Member of Parliament Syahredzan Johan, stated in his Facebook page post on 19 July 2025, that the Section 1 of the highway between Ampang and Sungai Long, which is his constituency, would be scheduled to be opened to the public in July 2025 according to the progress report by the contractor. He also stated in his post that Section 2 that connects Ampang with Ukay Perdana is estimated to be fully operational by January 2026, and has reached 76 per cent of completion.

The many delays of EKVE means by the time of its completion, it will have to compete with several alternatives to its route that have been completed earlier, such as SUKE (completed September 2022) and MRT Putrajaya Line (completed March 2023).

Construction of EKVE is attributed as the cause of several flash floods and mud floods in the areas the highway was built, including the 2021–2022 Malaysian floods in the Ampang/Hulu Langat area.

Phase 1A of the East Klang Valley Expressway opened on 29 August 2025 after a delay of 6 years.

== Features ==
- The expressway will connect Ukay Perdana in Ulu Klang and Bandar Sungai Long in Kajang, has interchanges also at Lembah Jaya in Ampang
- Length extended to 39.5 km to avoid sensitive areas due to public protests
- New alignment avoids the Klang Gates Quartz Ridge at Melawati
- Including a 200 m tunnel
- Costs RM 2.2 billion and has six toll plazas

== Controversies ==
- Phase 1 of the project is heavily criticized due to de-gazetting of 106.6 ha of the Ampang Forest Reserve, a critical source of water for Klang Valley.
- Phase 2 of the project (from Ukay Perdana to the Kuala Lumpur–Karak Expressway) would have cut through the Ulu Gombak forest reserve. Phase 2 has not been approved due to environmental concerns.

== Toll rates ==
- EKVE applies the closed toll system in their entire route, implemented in all their access points where vehicles are charged according to distance travelled.
- Toll charges were given free of charge (FOC) to drivers during the first 55 days of the expressway's Phase 1A opening since August 30, 2025.
- Starting October 25, 2025, toll charges are applied to drivers and the rates for the entirety of Phase 1A route (Ampang toll plaza to Sungai Long toll plaza) is as follows:

Class	Type of vehicles	Rate (in Malaysian Ringgit (RM))
0	Motorcycles	Free
1	Vehicles with 2 axles and 3 or 4 wheels excluding taxis	RM 6.08
2	Vehicles with 2 axles and 5 or 6 wheels excluding buses	RM 9.12
3	Vehicles with 3 or more axles	RM 12.16
4	Taxis	RM 3.04
5	Buses	RM 4.46

== Interchange and rest and service area lists ==
The entire route is located in Selangor.

Legend:

- I/C - Interchange, I/S - Intersection, RSA - Rest and service area, OBR - Overhead bridge restaurant, R/R - Restaurant and rest plaza, L/B - Layby, V/P - Vista point, TN - tunnel, T/P - Toll plaza, BR - Bridge
- C - Cloverleaf, S - Stack, T-A - Trumpet-A, T-B - Trumpet-B, DT - Directional-T/Y, SDT - Semi-Directional-T/Y, P-Y - Partial-Y, D - Diamond, P-C - Partial cloverleaf, D-D - Diverging diamond, D-R - Direct ramp

District	Subdistrict	Phase	Km	Exit	Name	Destination	Interchange Type	Notes
Gombak	Selayang	Phase 2 Canceled		27--	Templer Park West I/C	Kuala Lumpur–Kuala Selangor Expressway – Taiping, Assam Jawa, Sitiawan, Teluk Intan, Batu Caves, Selayang, Kuala Lumpur	Interchange	Canceled
Gombak	Ampang Jaya	Phase 2 Canceled		27--	Sungai Pusu I/C	Kuala Lumpur–Karak Expressway / FT 2 / AH141 – Kuala Terengganu, Kuantan, Genting Highlands, Kuala Lumpur, Batu Caves, Petaling Jaya	Interchange	Canceled
Gombak	Ampang Jaya	Phase 1B; Under construction		2705	Ukay Perdana I/C	Jalan Ukay Perdana – Ukay Perdana, Bukit Antarabangsa, Ulu Klang; FT 28 Kuala Lumpur Middle Ring Road 2 – Gombak, Ampang, Pandan Indah	Trumpet interchange	
Gombak	Ampang Jaya	Phase 1B; Under construction		T/P	Ukay Perdana Toll Plaza	Touch 'n Go MyRFID SmartTAG		
Hulu Langat	Ampang Jaya	Phase 1A		2704	Ampang I/C	B31 Jalan Ampang – Lembah Jaya, Ampang, Pandan Indah, Kuala Lumpur, KLCC; Sungai Besi–Ulu Klang Elevated Expressway – Sungai Besi, Shah Alam	Trumpet interchange	
Hulu Langat	Kajang	Phase 1A		L/B	Hulu Langat L/B	Hulu Langat L/B –		Northbound
Hulu Langat	Kajang	Phase 1A		L/B	Hulu Langat L/B	Hulu Langat L/B –		Southbound
Hulu Langat	Kajang	Phase 1A		2703	Hulu Langat I/C	Jalan Kuari Sungai Long – Taman Bukit Sekawan; B52 Jalan Hulu Langat – Hulu Langat, Batu 9 Cheras Town, Batu 18 Hulu Langat, Gabai River waterfalls	Trumpet interchange	
Hulu Langat	Kajang	Phase 1A		2702	Mahkota Cheras I/C	Persiaran Mahkota Cheras 1 – Bandar Mahkota Cheras, Batu 11 Cheras Town, Bandar Tun Hussein Onn, Sungai Long (U)	Trumpet interchange	
Hulu Langat	Kajang	Phase 1A		T/P	Sungai Long Toll Plaza	Touch 'n Go MyRFID SmartTAG		
Hulu Langat	Kajang	Phase 1A		2701	Sungai Long I/C	Kajang Dispersal Link Expressway – Sungai Long (S), Balakong, Seri Kembangan, Sungai Besi, Kajang, Putrajaya, Semenyih, Seremban	Trumpet interchange	
