= Selangor State Route B116 =

Road in Malaysia

Selangor Route 116

Route information
- Length: 11 km (6.8 mi)

Major junctions
- North end: Hulu Langat; Pekan Batu Empat Belas (Bt-14)
- B62 State Route B62; FT 3210 Federal Route 3210; State Route B52; State Route B19
- South end: Jalan Semenyih

Location
- Country: Malaysia
- Primary destinations: Kuala Lumpur, Ampang, Dusun Tua, Sungai Congkak, Semenyih, Kajang

Highway system
- Highways in Malaysia; Expressways; Federal; State

Selangor State Route B116, Jalan Sungai Tekali is a major road in Selangor, Malaysia.

== Junction lists ==
The entire route is located in Hulu Langat District, Selangor.

Legend:

- I/C - Interchange, I/S - Intersection, RSA - Rest and service area, OBR - Overhead bridge restaurant, R/R - Restaurant and rest plaza, L/B - Layby, V/P - Vista point, TN - tunnel, T/P - Toll plaza, BR - Bridge
- C - Cloverleaf, S - Stack, T-A - Trumpet-A, T-B - Trumpet-B, DT - Directional-T/Y, SDT - Semi-Directional-T/Y, P-Y - Partial-Y, D - Diamond, P-C - Partial cloverleaf, D-D - Diverging diamond, D-R - Direct ramp

Location	km	mi	Name	Destinations	Notes
Hulu Langat			Through to B62 Selangor State Route B62		
Hulu Langat			Hulu Langat; Pekan Batu Empat Belas (Bt-14)	Selangor State Route B52 – Pekan Batu Lapan Belas (Bt-18), Pangsun, Dusun Tua, Sungai Congkak, Sungai Gabai; FT 3210 Malaysia Federal Route 3210 – Pekan Batu Sembilan (Bt-19), Cheras, Kajang	Junctions
Hulu Langat			Sungai Langat bridge		
Sungai Tekali			Kampung Baru Sungai Makau		
Sungai Tekali			Sungai Tekali Industrial Area		
Sungai Tekali			Kampung Sungai Tekali		
Sungai Tekali			FELCRA Sungai Tekali		
Sungai Tekali			FELCRA Batu Merah		
Sungai Tekali			Kampung Batu Merah		
Sungai Tekali			Jalan Semenyih	Selangor State Route B19 – Sungai Congkak, Sungai Gabai, Kuala Klawang, Semenyih, Kajang	T-junctions
1.000 mi = 1.609 km; 1.000 km = 0.621 mi: Route transition
