= Selangor State Route B19 =

Road in Malaysia

Selangor Route 19

Major junctions
- North end: Pangsun; Pekan Batu Lapan Belas (Bt-18)
- B52 Jalan Hulu Langat; B32 Jalan Semenyih–Kuala Klawang; B116 Jalan Sungai Tekali; FT 1 Federal Route 1
- South end: Semenyih

Location
- Country: Malaysia
- Primary destinations: Hulu Langat, Sungai Gabai, Kuala Klawang

Highway system
- Highways in Malaysia; Expressways; Federal; State

Jalan Semenyih, Selangor State Route B19 is a major road in Selangor, Malaysia.

== Junction lists ==
Legend:

- I/C - Interchange, I/S - Intersection, RSA - Rest and service area, OBR - Overhead bridge restaurant, R/R - Restaurant and rest plaza, L/B - Layby, V/P - Vista point, TN - tunnel, T/P - Toll plaza, BR - Bridge
- C - Cloverleaf, S - Stack, T-A - Trumpet-A, T-B - Trumpet-B, DT - Directional-T/Y, SDT - Semi-Directional-T/Y, P-Y - Partial-Y, D - Diamond, P-C - Partial cloverleaf, D-D - Diverging diamond, D-R - Direct ramp

Location	km	Name	Destinations	Notes
Dusun Tua		Pangsun; Pekan Batu Lapan Belas (Bt-18)	B52 Jalan Hulu Langat – Sungai Congkak	T-junctions
Dusun Tua		Kampung Tanjung Pauh		
Dusun Tua		Kampung Masjid		
Dusun Tua		Kampung Sungai Pagoh		
Dusun Tua		Gabai River	Kampung Sungai Gabai – Sungai Gabai waterfall	T-junctions
Dusun Tua		Kampung Ulu Lui	Kampung Paya Lebar	T-junctions
Dusun Tua		Kampung Gemi	B32 Jalan Semenyih-Kuala Klawang – Kuala Klawang, Bahau, Seremban	T-junctions
Semenyih		Jalan Sungai Tekali	B116 Jalan Sungai Tekali – Sungai Tekali, Pekan Batu Empat Belas (Bt-14) Hulu Langat	T-junctions
Semenyih		Semenyih Dam		
Semenyih		Sungai Tekala waterfall		
Semenyih		Kampung Sungai Pening		
Semenyih		Kampung Sungai Lalang	Kampung Sungai Lalang – Sungai Batangsi waterfall	T-junctions
Semenyih		Kampung Pasir		
Semenyih		Taman Sahabat		
Semenyih		Semenyih	FT 1 Malaysia Federal Route 1 – Kuala Lumpur, Kajang, Beranang, Mantin, Seremban	T-junctions
1.000 mi = 1.609 km; 1.000 km = 0.621 mi
