= Selangor State Route B62 =

Road in Malaysia

Selangor Route 62

Major junctions
- West end: Ampang; Taman Permai
- Jalan Taman Putra; Sungai Besi–Ulu Klang Elevated Expressway; FT 3210 Federal Route 3210; State Route B52; State Route B116
- East end: Hulu Langat; Pekan Batu Empat Belas (Bt-14)

Location
- Country: Malaysia
- Primary destinations: Kuala Lumpur, Dusun Tua, Sungai Congkak, Semenyih Dam, Cheras

Highway system
- Highways in Malaysia; Expressways; Federal; State

Selangor State Route B62, Jalan Ampang–Hulu Langat or Jalan Tasik Tambahan is a major road in Selangor, Malaysia. The road connects Taman Permai near Ampang in the west to Pekan Batu Empat Belas (Bt-14) Hulu Langat in the east. Its main features including a panoramic view of Kuala Lumpur from the top of Bukit Belacan hill.

== Route background ==
The Kilometre Zero of the highway starts at Pekan Batu Empat Belas (Bt-14) town of Hulu Langat.

== Notable events ==
- 15 November 2012 – Jalan Ampang–Hulu Langat is closed to all vehicles following a landslide near the Kuala Lumpur Look Out Point Tourist Complex in Bukit Ampang/Bukit Belacan hill.
- 24 March 2014 – One person was killed and others injured in a school bus crash at Jalan Ampang–Hulu Langat near Ampang Look Out Point.

== Features ==
=== Kuala Lumpur Look Out Point Tourist Complex ===
The Kuala Lumpur Look Out Point Tourist Complex, or Kompleks Pelancongan Menara Tinjau, is a popular attractions in Kuala Lumpur. It is located about 15 km from Kuala Lumpur city centre.

==== Facilities ====
Menara Tinjau (Look Out Point Tower)	An observation tower
Look Out Point Restaurant and Cafe	Panorama Restaurant; Haven Look Out Point Cafe; Look Out Point Western Food
Kem Bina Negara	
Taman Burung (Bird's Cage)	

==== Admissions ====
Hours	Rate (in Malaysian Ringgit (RM))
During daytime (From 7:00 am to 7:00 pm)	Free
During nighttime (From 7:00 pm to 3:00 am)	RM 2.00 (RM 3.00 for hilltop parking)

== Junction lists ==
The entire route is located in Hulu Langat District, Selangor.

Legend:

- I/C - Interchange, I/S - Intersection, RSA - Rest and service area, OBR - Overhead bridge restaurant, R/R - Restaurant and rest plaza, L/B - Layby, V/P - Vista point, TN - tunnel, T/P - Toll plaza, BR - Bridge
- C - Cloverleaf, S - Stack, T-A - Trumpet-A, T-B - Trumpet-B, DT - Directional-T/Y, SDT - Semi-Directional-T/Y, P-Y - Partial-Y, D - Diamond, P-C - Partial cloverleaf, D-D - Diverging diamond, D-R - Direct ramp

Location	km	mi	Name	Destinations	Notes
Ampang Jaya			Ampang; Kampung Tasek Permai	Jalan Taman Putra – Ampang town centre, Kuala Lumpur, Ulu Kelang, Ampang Hospital, Pandan Indah, Cheras	T-junctions
Ampang Jaya			Tasik Tambahan-SUKE I/C	Sungai Besi–Ulu Klang Elevated Expressway – Cheras, Sungai Besi	From/to southbound only
Ampang Jaya			Ampang bound, Engage lower gear		
Ampang Jaya			Kuala Lumpur panoramic view 190 m above sea level	V	
Ampang Jaya			Taman Mulia Jaya; 190 m above sea level	Taman Mulia Jaya	T-junctions
MPAJ–MPKj			197 m above sea level		
Hulu Langat			Kuala Lumpur Look Out Point Tourist Complex; 205 m above sea level	V Kuala Lumpur Look Out Point Tourist Complex – Look Out Point Tower, Look Out Point Restaurant and Cafe (Panorama Restaurant, Haven Look Out Point Cafe, Look Out Point Western Food), Kem Bina Negara, Taman Burung (Bird's Cage); V	T-junctions
Hulu Langat			Vege Park; 200 m above sea level	V	
Hulu Langat			Hulu Langat bound, Engage lower gear		
Hulu Langat			Taman Pinggiran Delima	Taman Pinggiran Delima	T-junctions
Hulu Langat			Taman Wawasan	Taman Wawasan	T-junctions
Hulu Langat			SK Tun Abdul Aziz Majid	Sekolah Kebangsaan Tun Abdul Aziz Majid, Hulu Langat	
Hulu Langat	0.0	0.0	Hulu Langat; Pekan Batu Empat Belas (Bt-14)	Selangor State Route B52 – Pekan Batu Lapan Belas (Bt-18) Pangsun, Dusun Tua, Sungai Congkak, Sungai Gabai; FT 3210 Malaysia Federal Route 3210 – Pekan Batu Sembilan (Bt-19) Cheras, Kajang	Junctions
Hulu Langat			Through to Selangor State Route B116		
1.000 mi = 1.609 km; 1.000 km = 0.621 mi: Incomplete access; Route transition
