= Selangor State Route B52 =

Road in Malaysia

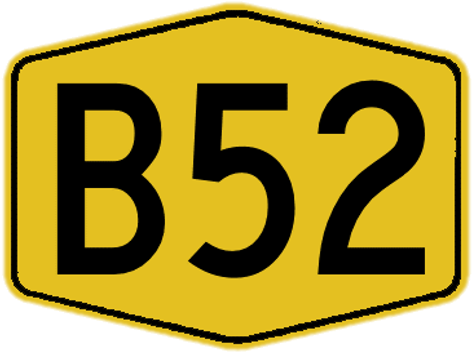
Selangor Route 52
- Jalan Hulu Langat

Major junctions
- Northeast end: Langat Dam
- State Route B19; B62 State Route B62; State Route B116; East Klang Valley Expressway; FT 1 Federal Route 1
- Southwest end: Cheras; Pekan Batu Sembilan (Bt-9)

Location
- Country: Malaysia
- Primary destinations: Kuala Lumpur, Hulu Langat (Pekan Batu Empat Belas (Bt-14)), Dusun Tua, Sungai Congkak, Sungai Gabai, Semenyih Dam, Semenyih

Highway system
- Highways in Malaysia; Expressways; Federal; State

Selangor State Route B52, Jalan Hulu Langat, is a major road in Selangor, Malaysia. The 10-km section of this road, which is known as Jalan Kawasan Perindustrian Hulu Langat (from Pekan Batu Sembilan (Bt-9) Cheras to Pekan Batu Empat Belas (Bt-14) Hulu Langat), is also commissioned as Industrial Federal Route 3210. It connects with the East Klang Valley Expressway.

== Junction lists ==
The entire route is located in Hulu Langat District, Selangor.

Legend:

- I/C - Interchange, I/S - Intersection, RSA - Rest and service area, OBR - Overhead bridge restaurant, R/R - Restaurant and rest plaza, L/B - Layby, V/P - Vista point, TN - tunnel, T/P - Toll plaza, BR - Bridge
- C - Cloverleaf, S - Stack, T-A - Trumpet-A, T-B - Trumpet-B, DT - Directional-T/Y, SDT - Semi-Directional-T/Y, P-Y - Partial-Y, D - Diamond, P-C - Partial cloverleaf, D-D - Diverging diamond, D-R - Direct ramp

Location	km	mi	Name	Destinations	Notes
Hulu Langat			Cheras–Hulu Langat see also FT 3210 Malaysia Federal Route 3210		
Hulu Langat			Hulu Langat-EKVE	Jalan Kuari Sungai Long – Taman Bukit Sekawan; East Klang Valley Expressway – Ampang, Ukay Perdana, Kajang, Seremban	T-junctions
Hulu Langat			Hulu Langat; Pekan Batu Empat Belas (Bt-14)	B62 Selangor State Route B62 – Ampang, Kuala Lumpur, Kuala Lumpur Look Out Point Tourist Complex; Selangor State Route B116 – Sungai Tekali, Semenyih Dam, Semenyih	Junctions
Hulu Langat			Taman Indah Jaya		
Hulu Langat			FELCRA Sungai Semungkis		
Dusun Tua			Taman Sri Kundang		
Dusun Tua			Taman Desa Sentosa		
Dusun Tua			Kampung Haji Palil	Kampung Haji Palil	T-junctions
Dusun Tua			Dusun Tua		
Dusun Tua			Taman Damai		
Pangsun			Pangsun; Pekan Batu Lapan Belas (Bt-18)	Selangor State Route B19 – Gabai River, Sungai Gabai waterfall, Semenyih, Kuala Klawang	T-junctions
Pangsun			Kampung Lubuk Kelubi		
Pangsun			Kampung Sungai Congkak		
Pangsun			Sungai Congkak waterfall	Sungai Congkak waterfall, Pangsun recreational park	T-junctions
Pangsun			Kampung Padang		
Pangsun			Orang Asli village		
Pangsun			Kampung Lepok		
Pangsun			Kampung Kuala Pangsun		
Langat Dam			Langat Dam	V Langat Dam, Pangsun Dam recreational park	
1.000 mi = 1.609 km; 1.000 km = 0.621 mi: Concurrency terminus
