= Sungai Besi–Ulu Klang Elevated Expressway =

Highway in Malaysia

Sungai Besi–Ulu Klang Elevated Expressway
- Lebuhraya Bertingkat Sungai Besi–Ulu Klang

Route information
- Maintained by Prolintas
- Length: 24.4 km (15.2 mi)
- Existed: 2012–present
- History: Opened in stages from: 2021; Phase 1: 16 September 2022 (DUKE Highway-CKE Highway). Phase 2: 16 June 2023 (CKE Highway-KESAS Highway)

Major junctions
- North end: FT 28 Kuala Lumpur Middle Ring Road 2 Duta–Ulu Klang Expressway
- Ampang–Kuala Lumpur Elevated Highway; Jalan Mamanda 11; B31 Jalan Ampang; Jalan Bukit Indah Utama; Jalan Taman Putra; B62 Jalan Ampang-Hulu Langat; Cheras–Kajang Expressway; Kuala Lumpur–Seremban Expressway
- South end: Shah Alam Expressway at Sungai Besi, Kuala Lumpur

Location
- Country: Malaysia
- Primary destinations: Bukit Jalil, Sri Petaling, Sungai Besi, Cheras, Pandan Indah, Hulu Langat, Ampang, Ulu Kelang

Highway system
- Highways in Malaysia; Expressways; Federal; State

Logo of the expressway with its route code

The E19 Sungai Besi–Ulu Klang Elevated Expressway (SUKE) is a 24.4-kilometre (15.2-mile) three-laned, dual carriageway, controlled-access highway in Kuala Lumpur and Selangor, Malaysia. The expressway will run on top of the existing Kuala Lumpur Middle Ring Road 2 between Sungai Besi and Ulu Klang, with the intent of reducing traffic along the road.

== Route description ==
SUKE Highway elevated segment at Jalan Ampang

The expressway begins in Ulu Klang, Selangor in the north, then runs above Middle Ring Road 2 to Ampang. The expressway then diverts southeast through Ampang Town, before turning back southwest through Cheras and Alam Damai. The expressway finally turns westwards to meet Middle Ring Road 2 again before terminating at Sungai Besi, where the road continues into the Shah Alam Expressway.

== History ==
The increasing traffic along the FT28 Kuala Lumpur Middle Ring Road 2 along the links of Ulu Klang, Ampang, Pandan Indah, Cheras, Bandar Tun Razak and Bandar Tasik Selatan facilitated the need for increasing road capacity. Prolintas proposed that the expressway to be built to meet these requirements. The expressway will act as an alternative route to Kajang from Ulu Klang. The project was allocated RM5.3 billion in the Budget 2015.

== Features ==
- Elevated toll plazas.
- Most of the highway is elevated, hence its name.
- First road in Malaysia to have a helix ramp.
- A rest and service area at Tasik Tambahan

== Incidents ==
There have been multiple reports of accidents happening related to SUKE during its construction period and after it had been opened.

- September 20, 2020 - A woman escaped death when a concrete slab fell onto her car from the elevated construction nearby Bandar Tasik Selatan. She broke her left arm and collar bone due to the accident and the contractors involved were fined RM180,000. The investigation discovered that the subcontractor did not follow the proper work procedures and also had a site supervisor with no accreditation.
- March 3, 2021 - An overhead bridge under construction collapsed when a trailer hit the steel scaffolding of the bridge nearby Bandar Tasik Selatan. The trailer however was not involved with the project and the driver was tested positive for drugs. The trailer was said to be overloaded when the accident happened. The director of Department of Occupational Safety and Health (DOSH) commented that the heavy trailer along with the low structure of the bridge caused the bridge to collapse when they hit each other. The accident left two factory workers dead and three injured in a van nearby the accident area.
- March 17, 2021 - An accident occurred also nearby Bandar Tasik Selatan between two cars when one of the cars lost control and hit the other one. The car that lost control crashed into the pillar of the construction site, where the driver died at the scene while the other driver did not sustain any injuries.
- June 14, 2023 - A 60-year old man riding a motorcycle plunged off the ramp going the down the highway at kilometer 22.2 while trying to avoid a collision with another motorcycle that was going against the traffic.

== Tolls ==
SUKE adopts an open toll system.

=== Electronic Toll Collections (ETC) ===
As part of an initiative to facilitate faster transactions at the Ampang, Bukit Teratai and Alam Damai Toll Plazas, all toll transactions at these three toll plazas on SUKE are conducted electronically via Touch 'n Go cards or SmartTAGs beginning 15 October 2022.

=== Toll rates ===
There are three toll plazas (Ampang, Bukit Teratai and Alam Damai) along SUKE, each charging the same rate.

(Starting 15 October 2022)

Class	Type of vehicles	Rate (in Malaysian Ringgit (RM))
0	Motorcycles	Free
1	Vehicles with 2 axles and 3 or 4 wheels excluding taxis	RM 2.30
2	Vehicles with 2 axles and 5 or 6 wheels excluding buses	RM 4.60
3	Vehicles with 3 or more axles	RM 6.90
4	Taxis	RM 1.20
5	Buses	RM 2.30

== Interchange lists ==
State/territory	District	Location	km	mi	Exit	Name	Destinations	Notes
Selangor	Gombak	Gombak			Through to FT 28 Kuala Lumpur Middle Ring Road 2			
Selangor	Gombak	Gombak			1912	Bukit Antarabangsa interchange	Duta–Ulu Klang Expressway – Sentul, Segambut, Jalan Duta, Mont Kiara, Damansara, Petaling Jaya, Ipoh	Elevated stacked interchange
Selangor	Gombak	Gombak				Hill View interchange	FT 28 Kuala Lumpur Middle Ring Road 2 Duta–Ulu Klang Expressway	Southbound entrance only
Selangor	Gombak	Gombak			1911	Ulu Kelang interchange	Ampang–Kuala Lumpur Elevated Highway – Kuala Lumpur, KLCC	Northbound and southbound exits to west Northbound entrance from west
Selangor	Gombak	Gombak				Ampang Point interchange	Ampang–Kuala Lumpur Elevated Highway; Jalan Mamanda 11	Southbound entrance only
Selangor	Gombak–Hulu Langat district border				Sungai Ampang bridge			
Selangor	Hulu Langat	Ampang			1910	Pekan Ampang interchange	B31 Jalan Ampang – Kuala Lumpur, KLCC	Interchange; Northbound exit only
Selangor	Hulu Langat	Ampang			Ampang Toll Plaza (northbound)			
Selangor	Hulu Langat	Ampang				Pekan Ampang interchange	B31 Jalan Ampang	Northbound entrance only
Selangor	Hulu Langat	Ampang			Ampang Toll Plaza (southbound)			
Selangor	Hulu Langat	Ampang			1909	Kosas interchange	Jalan Bukit Indah Utama – Taman Bukit Indah, Ampang, Taman Kosas	Northbound entrance and southbound exit only
Selangor	Hulu Langat	Tasik Tambahan			1908	Permai interchange	Jalan Taman Putra – Taman Tasik Tambahan	Northbound entrance and southbound exit only
Selangor	Hulu Langat	Tasik Tambahan			1907	Tasik Tambahan interchange	B52 Jalan Hulu Langat – Kampung Tasik Tambahan, Hulu Langat	Multi-layer ribbon loop interchange with Y-split interchange Northbound exit and southbound entrance only
Selangor	Hulu Langat	Tasik Tambahan			Tasik Tambahan RSA (southbound, under planning)			
Selangor	Hulu Langat	Bukit Teratai			1906	Bukit Teratai interchange	Jalan Teratai 1/2 – Taman Bukit Teratai, Pandan Indah	Ribbon loop interchange Southbound entrance and northbound exit only
Selangor	Hulu Langat	Bukit Teratai			Bukit Teratai Toll Plaza			
Selangor	Hulu Langat	Bukit Teratai				Elevated U-Turn	Bukit Teratai interchange	Southbound
Selangor	Hulu Langat	Cheras				Jalan Bukit Segar Entrance	Jalan Bukit Segar	Entrance to both directions only
Selangor	Hulu Langat	Cheras				Elevated U-Turn	Cheras Hartamas interchange, Cheras-Kajang interchange	Northbound
Selangor	Hulu Langat	Cheras			1905	Cheras Hartamas interchange	Jalan Cheras Hartamas – Cheras, Taman Tayton	Southbound exit only
Selangor	Hulu Langat	Cheras			1904	Cheras Kajang interchange	Cheras–Kajang Expressway – Kuala Lumpur, Cheras, Petaling Jaya, Kajang, Balakong, Seremban	Stack interchange Northbound entrances and southbound exits only Including southbound entrance from southeast
Kuala Lumpur	N/A	Cheras			1903	Alam Damai interchange	Jalan Alam Damai – Alam Damai, Cheras	Stack triangle interchange
Kuala Lumpur	N/A	Cheras				Double decker carriageway	SUKE Administration Building	Northbound
Kuala Lumpur	N/A	Cheras			Alam Damai Toll Plaza			
Kuala Lumpur	N/A	Cheras			1902	Sungai Besi interchange	Sungai Besi Expressway – Terminal Bersepadu Selatan, City Centre, Pandan Indah, Sungai Besi, Seri Kembangan, Mines Resort City, Kajang, National Defense University of Malaysia (UPNM)	Interchange with elevated U-turn. No entry from south.
Kuala Lumpur	N/A	Cheras			1901	Sri Petaling interchange	Complex system (cloverleaf/stacked/trumpet) with flyover toward Salak Selatan/Bangsar/Kuala Lumpur; Links: Shah Alam Expressway – Bandar Kinara, Puchong, USJ, Shah Alam, Klang; Kuala Lumpur–Seremban Expressway – Kuala Lumpur, Petaling Jaya, Sungai Besi; North–South Expressway Southern Route – Kajang, KLIA, Seremban, Malacca, Johor Bahru; Jalan Merah Caga – KL Sports City, Bukit Jalil, Sri Petaling	Complex system
Kuala Lumpur	N/A	Cheras			Through to Shah Alam Expressway			
1.000 mi = 1.609 km; 1.000 km = 0.621 mi: Electronic toll collection; Incomplete access; Proposed; Route transition
