= 3210 =

3210 may refer to:

- A.D. 3210, a year in the 4th millennium CE
- 3210 BC, a year in the 4th millennium BCE
- 3210, a number in the 3000 (number) range

== Roads numbered 3210 ==
- Hawaii Route 3210, a state highway
- Louisiana Highway 3210, a state highway
- Texas Farm to Market Road 3210, a state highway
- Malaysia Federal Route 3210, a highway in Selangor
- A3210 road, in the UK

== Other uses ==
- 3210 Lupishko, an asteroid in the Asteroid Belt, the 3210th asteroid registered
- Nokia 3210, a cellphone
