= Kuala Lumpur University of Science & Technology =

Private university in Malaysia

Coordinates: 2.9778164°N 101.7379653°E

Kuala Lumpur University of Science and Technology
- Motto: For Knowledge, For Humanity
- Type: Private university
- Established: 1998
- Chancellor: Prof. Chen Xiaoyun
- President: Prof Ts. Dr. David Ngo Chek Ling
- Location: Kajang, Selangor, Malaysia
- Campus: 100 acres (0.40 km^{2})
- Website: www.iukl.edu.my

Kuala Lumpur University of Science and Technology (KLUST) formerly known as Infrastructure University Kuala Lumpur (IUKL) (Malay: Universiti Infrastruktur Kuala Lumpur) and Kuala Lumpur Infrastructure University College (KLIUC), is a university in Kajang, Hulu Langat District, Selangor, Malaysia. It is the first infrastructure university in Malaysia. It was established in 1998 following the privatisation of the Research and Training Institute of Public Works Department of Malaysia (IKRAM).

The university is now managed by Star Teenagers International Sdn. Bhd. The President and Vice-Chancellor of IUKL is Prof. Ts. Dr. David Ngo Chek Ling. The University has a new name, it is now called KLUST, Kuala Lumpur University of Science & Technology.

== History ==
The initiation of IUKL began in 1997 when the Research and Training Institute of the Public Works Department, Malaysia (IKRAM) was privatised and became known as Kumpulan Ikram Sdn Bhd (KISB). KISB inherited Ikram Park and IKRAM's distinctive features and strengths.

Ikram College was established the following year and made the focus of KISB's tertiary education activities to nurture the leaders of tomorrow. The opening of Ikram College was officiated by Malaysian Prime Minister Tun Dr. Mahathir Mohamad in 1999.

By 2001, Ikram College had its name changed to Ikram College of Technology (iCT) to further strengthen its niche in the provision of technology and infrastructure-based programmes. iCT was upgraded to a University College status with a new name: Kuala Lumpur Infrastructure University College (KLIUC) in 2003 with the Malaysian Prime Minister, Tun Abdullah Ahmad Badawi, officiated its opening.

In February 2012, IKRAM Education Sdn. Bhd. was invited by the Malaysian Ministry of Higher Education to apply for the establishment of a private university to be known as the Infrastructure University of Kuala Lumpur. KLIUC was upgraded to a full-fledged university in 2013 and officially known as the Infrastructure University Kuala Lumpur (IUKL) today.

== Campus ==
IUKL's 100-acre (0.40 km^{2}) campus is nestled in the vicinity of Kajang and Serdang, which is between the capital Kuala Lumpur and Putrajaya, the administrative city of Malaysia. It is within a 35-minute drive from Kuala Lumpur city centre, 40 minutes from the Kuala Lumpur International Airport (KLIA) and 20 minutes from Cyberjaya, the country's intelligent city.

== Living and accommodation ==
Student accommodation is available on and off campus including hostel blocks, Students Residency at Unipark condominiums, and Soho units at De Centrum.
