= Sate Kajang Haji Samuri =

Malaysian fast food restaurant chain

Sate Kajang Haji Samuri is a Sate Kajang fast-food restaurant chain in Malaysia. The main headquarters is located in Medan Sate, Kajang, Selangor.

== Branches ==
Among other Sate Kajang Haji Samuri locations are:

=== Selangor and Klang Valley ===
1. Bangunan Kajang, Selangor Darul Ehsan
2. In front of Metro Kajang, Kajang, Selangor Darul Ehsan
3. Awan Besar Rest and Service Area, Shah Alam Expressway (Kesas), Kuala Lumpur
4. Kinrara Rest and Service Area, Shah Alam Expressway (Kesas), Kuala Lumpur
5. Sungai Buloh Overhead Bridge Restaurant, North–South Expressway Northern Route, Selangor Darul Ehsan.
6. Dengkil Rest and Service Area, North–South Expressway Central Link, Selangor Darul Ehsan (Both bound)
7. Elmina Rest and Service Area, Guthrie Corridor Expressway, Selangor Darul Ehsan (northbound)
8. Uptown, Damansara Utama, Selangor Darul Ehsan
9. Taipan USJ, UEP Subang Jaya, Selangor Darul Ehsan
10. Precinct 16, Putrajaya
11. Taman Melati, Ulu Kelang, Selangor Darul Ehsan.
12. Aked MARA, Bngunan MARA, Jalan Raja Laut, Kuala Lumpur
13. Kompleks PKNS, Shah Alam, Selangor Darul Ehsan
14. Kompleks PKNS, Bangi, Selangor Darul Ehsan
15. Selayang Mall, Selayang, Selangor Darul Ehsan
16. Bukit Tinggi, Klang

=== Others ===
1. Taipan, Senawang, Negeri Sembilan Darul Khusus
2. Jalan Pantai, Port Dickson, Negeri Sembilan Darul Khusus
