= Beranang =

Malaysian town and mukim

Coordinates: 2°53′N 101°52′E

Beranang in Hulu Langat District

Beranang is a town and a mukim in Hulu Langat District, Selangor, Malaysia.

== Residential areas ==
- Eco Majestic
- Rinching
- Tasik Kesuma
- Bukit Mahkota

== Transportation ==
=== Car ===
Federal Route 1 (Kuala Lumpur-Johor Bahru road) runs through Beranang town.

=== Public transport ===
Rapid Bus T450 to Kajang central business district (Stadium Kajang MRT).
