= GMI-University College of Applied Sciences =

German-Malaysian Institute
- Institut Jerman-Malaysia (Malay); Deutsch-Malaysisches Institut (German) 德国马来西亚学院-应用科学大学学院 (Chinese)
- Former names: German-Malaysian Institute
- Type: Private University College
- Established: 1991
- Location: Jalan Ilmiah, Taman Universiti, 43000 Kajang, Selangor, Malaysia; 2.933958°N 101.7979588°E
- Website: www.gmi.edu.my

Chinese name
- Simplified Chinese: 德国马来西亚学院-应用科学大学学院
- Traditional Chinese: 德國馬來西亞學院-大學應用科學學院
Transcriptions
Standard Mandarin
- Hanyu Pinyin: Déguó Mǎláixīyà Xuéyuàn-Yìngyòng Kēxué Dàxué Xuéyuàn

The German-Malaysian Institute; German: Deutsch-Malaysisches Institut Malay: Institut Jerman-Malaysia) is the German-Malaysian educational institute in Malaysia.

It was located at Taman Shamelin Perkasa, Cheras, Kuala Lumpur but has moved to the new campus in Jalan Ilmiah, Taman Universiti, 43000 Kajang, Selangor.

GMI started its first student enrollment in 1992, and upgraded into University College status in October 2024.

== History ==
The German-Malaysian Institute (GMI) was established in 1991. It is a center for advanced skills training that offers courses with hands-on practicals and theory in the fields of Mechanical Engineering and Electrical Engineering.

The formation of GMI is the result of a joint venture project between the governments of Malaysia and Germany. It is governed by a board of directors composed of ten representatives from the industry and also from government bodies. This institution is set up as a Company Limited by Guarantee whose founders are Majlis Amanah Rakyat (MARA) and the Malaysian-German Chamber of Commerce and Industry (MGCC). GMI had its first student enrollment in 1992, and the number has continued to grow until now.

== Services ==
GMI offers 3-year full-time diploma programs in Electrical Engineering (Electronics & IT, Mechatronics, Process Instrumentation & Control, Cybersecurity, Sustainable Energy and Power Distribution, Industrial Plant Maintenance) & Mechanical Engineering (Mould, Tool & Die, Product Design & Manufacturing, CNC, Sheet Metal Fabrication & Product Development, Manufacturing System), German University Preparatory Program (GAPP) and Technical Teacher Training Program. Other services include short-term technology-related courses, industrial projects and consultancy.

GMI has graduated students in various fields namely design, manufacture, operation, maintenance, fault analysis and complex production plant repair, machinery, equipment, tools and manufactured products.

== Facilities ==
=== Sport Complex ===
The indoor complex consists of five multipurpose courts for takraw, basketball and badminton, alongside the futsal and squash courts. For outdoor games like tennis, netball, basketball and volleyball, courts are located on the peripheries of the complex. Adjacent to the main complex is a soccer field with roofed grandstand and seats.

=== Mass Sitting ===
Part of GMI’s amenities includes mass-seating facilities to cater to the growing number of students and staff, as well as for a variety of occasions. Among the facilities are the Feisol Hassan-Halle (GMI Hall), an auditorium, and two lecture halls. Standing prominently in the center of the training compound, with a hemispherical roof atop, is Dewan Gemilang Mercu. This hall accommodates up to 3,000 people in a theater layout and up to 600 people in a banquet setting at any one time.

=== Accommodation ===
GMI admission offers new students accommodation (subject to availability). Students are given the option and are encouraged to stay in the hostel. The hostel is located within the campus which is gated and guarded 24-hours a day. There are 6 high-rise elevated hostel blocks that can accommodate 3,010 students at any one time.

== Academics ==
=== Departments ===
==== Department of Electrical Engineering (EED) ====
===== Diploma in Engineering Technology =====
- Mechatronics
- Process Instrumentation & Control
- Electronics & Information Technology
- Cybersecurity
- Sustainable Energy & Power Distribution
- Industrial Plant Maintenance
- Building Automation & Facilities
- Industrial Communication System
- Autotronics & Hybrid System
- Creative Multimedia
- Software Engineering

==== Department of Mechanical Engineering (MED) ====
===== Diploma in Engineering Technology =====
- Mould Technology
- Tool & Die Technology
- Product Design & Manufacturing
- CNC Precision Technology
- Manufacturing System
- Sheet Metal Fabrication & Product Development
- Industrial Design
- Machine Tool Maintenance
- Jigs & Fixtures Design and Manufacturing
- Industrial Quality Management

==== German University Preparatory Programmes ====
- German University Preparatory Programme (GAPP)

=== Partner Institutions ===
- Australia
  - Australian National University
- Germany
  - Mannheim University of Applied Sciences
- Malaysia
  - Universiti Teknologi Petronas

== See also ==
- Germany–Malaysia relations
