= Germany–Malaysia relations =

- Germany: Malaysia

Germany–Malaysia relations are the foreign relations between Germany and Malaysia. Germany has an embassy in Kuala Lumpur, and Malaysia has an embassy in Berlin.

== History ==
=== Colonial period ===
The first related history with the German Empire is when the Austrian-German Consul in Hong Kong named Baron von Overbeck received a parcel of territory in the western coast of northern Borneo after being promoted by an American merchant named Joseph William Torrey in Hong Kong. von Overbeck then depart to Brunei to renewed the concession from the Temenggong of Brunei, and a similar treaty from the Sultanate of Sulu on 22 January 1878. To finance his plans for the territory, von Overbeck gets a financial backing from the Dent brothers (Alfred and Edward). However, after a high effort to promote the territory to the Austrian and German governments, he was unable to get any attention from the two to conquer the territory. Overbeck later withdrew in 1879, leaving it to Alfred Dent to manage the territory.

=== Modern relations ===
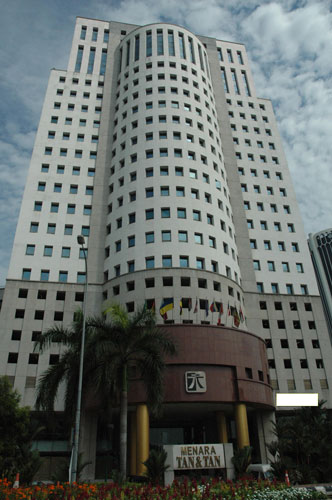
Building hosting the German Embassy in Kuala Lumpur, Malaysia.

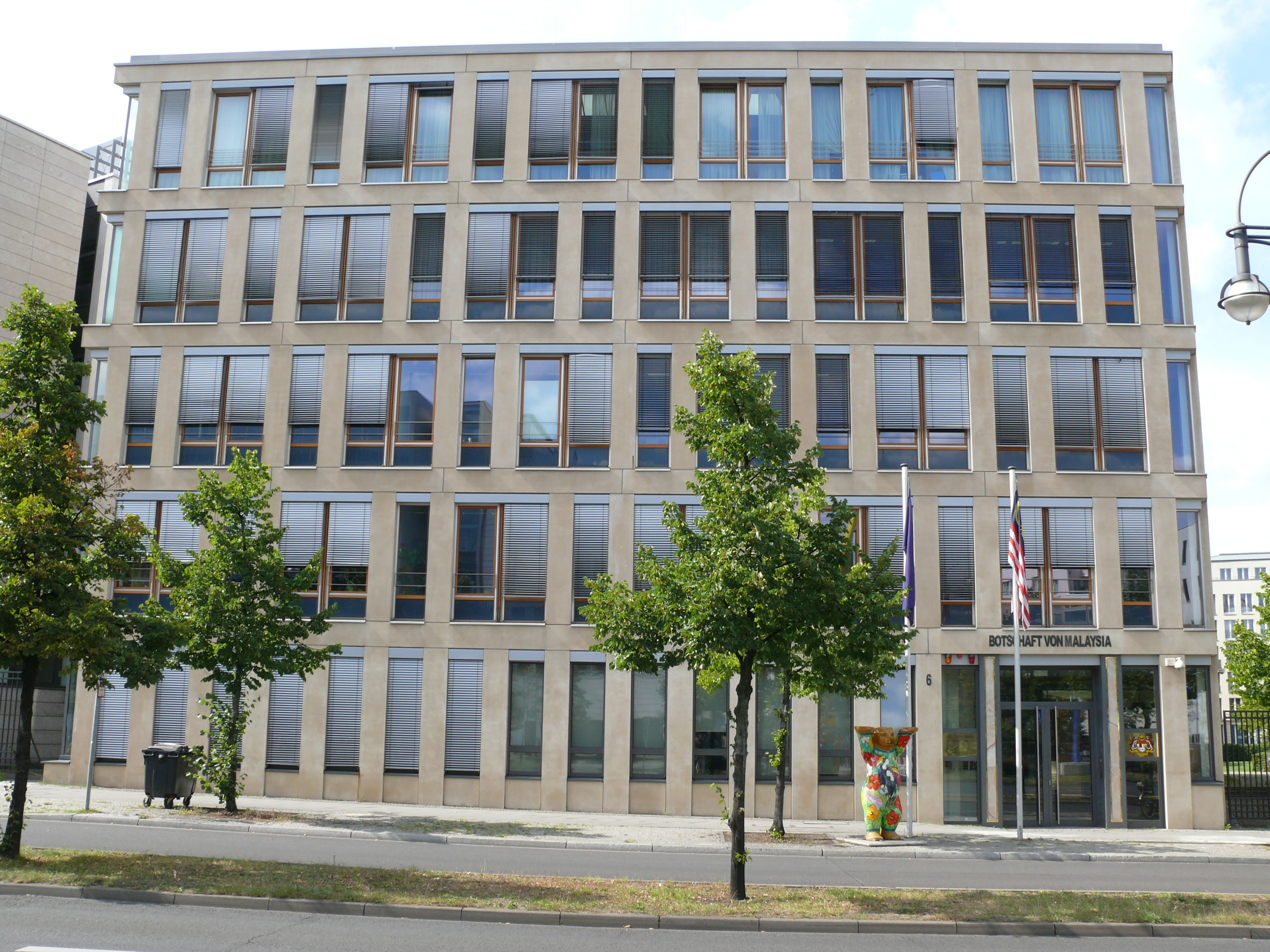
Embassy of Malaysia in Berlin

The first-ever visit of a German chancellor to Malaysia came about when the then prime minister of Malaysia, Mahathir Mohamad, invited the chancellor of Germany at that time, Gerhard Schröder, to visit the country in March 2002. The first official visit was then made in the following year by Schröder. In September 2004, the next Malaysian Prime Minister Abdullah Ahmad Badawi made a bilateral talks with Chancellor Angela Merkel during the Asia–Europe Meeting (ASEM Summit) in Hanoi, Vietnam. On 17 May 2005, a visit was made by Abdullah for political and economic talks with Schröder. A brief visit to Kuala Lumpur by German Foreign Minister Joschka Fischer was made on 10 February 2005. On 11 September 2006, Abdullah met again with Merkel for the second bilateral talks on the sidelines of the ASEM Summit in Helsinki, Finland.

== Economic relations ==
Malaysia has been Germany's principal trading partner among the ASEAN countries for several years, with Germany also becoming one of the biggest investors in Malaysia. Trade in 2006 amounted to approximately €7.6 billion, 9.67% up from the previous year. Germany imports electrical products, office machinery, edible and industrial fats and oils, rubber products, primary chemical products from Malaysia, and exports machinery, motor vehicles and aircraft, hardware and pharmaceutical products to the country. In 2014, the German imports from Malaysia reached 6.1 billion while its exports to Malaysia were 14.8 billion.

== Tourism ==
In 2001, there were over 70,400 tourist arrivals from Germany in Malaysia, which is the second largest number of tourist arrivals in Malaysia from Europe after the United Kingdom. This is out of the 12.8 million tourist arrivals recorded for 2001, which was a 25% increase from 2000.

== Cultural links ==
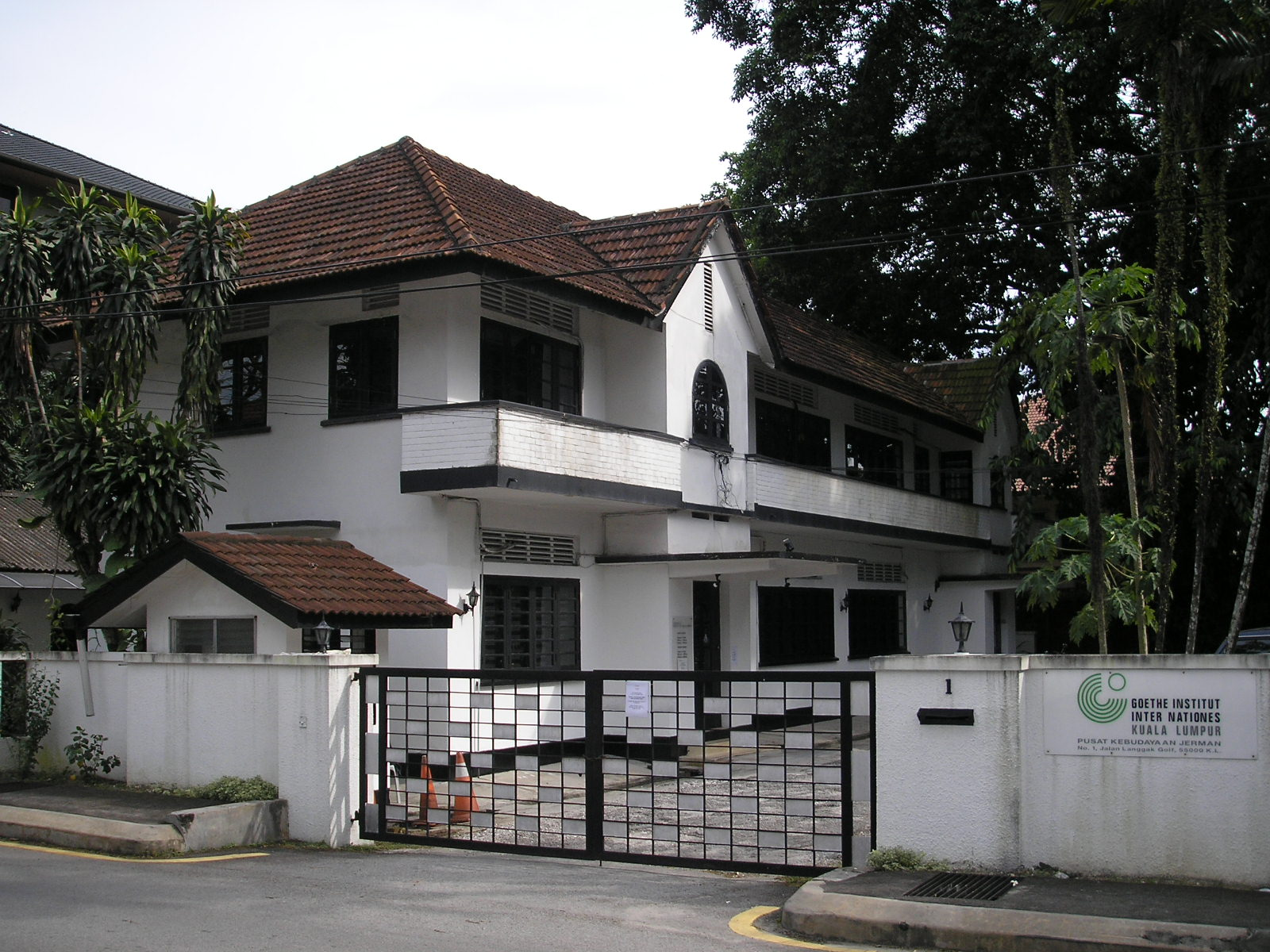
The former Goethe-Institut building on Jalan Tun Razak, Kuala Lumpur. This was previously the residence of a British official from the colonial era. Goethe-Institut Kuala Lumpur is currently located in an office building in Tun Razak Exchange.

Cultural links between Germany and Malaysia mainly exist in education and language. The Goethe-Institut, a German cultural institution, has a branch in Kuala Lumpur. Meanwhile, the Malaysian German Society in George Town, the capital city of the Malaysian state of Penang, was established in 1962. German language courses are available at both centres, which also host German cultural festivals such as the annual Oktoberfest celebrations.

Two state universities in Malaysia offer bachelor's degree courses in German. About 30 co-operation agreements exist between German and Malaysian universities of applied sciences. In 2017, over 700 Malaysians with government scholarships are studying at German universities, mainly in the engineering field. The German Academic Exchange Service maintains its own information centre in Kuala Lumpur.

An English version of Deutsche Welle TV channel broadcasts on Hypp TV, an IPTV provider through the fibre-optic Unifi network by Telekom Malaysia. Previously, in the 2000s, several television programmes of Deutsche Welle were available on Astro, Malaysia's only satellite provider. There are also contacts in the music, theatre and film sectors. As part of co-operation between museums, Germany helped to fund a regional restoration centre in the Islamic Arts Museum.

There are also several German political foundations that support sociocultural, education and media projects in Malaysia. The Konrad Adenauer Foundation has an office in Kuala Lumpur and the Friedrich Naumann and Friedrich Ebert foundations are also active in the country.

== Resident diplomatic missions ==
- Germany has an embassy in Kuala Lumpur and a consulate-general in Kuching.
- Malaysia has an embassy in Berlin and a consulate-general in Frankfurt.

== See also ==
- Foreign relations of Germany
- Foreign relations of Malaysia
