= New Era University College =

Art school in Kajang, Malaysia

Coordinates: 2.987913°N 101.791662°E

- Kolej Universiti New Era (Malay) 新纪元大学学院 (Chinese)
- Former names: New Era College (1997-2017)
- Type: Private
- Established: 1997
- Academic affiliations: MAPCU
- Vice-Chancellor: Dr. Mok Soon Chong
- Students: 2,500
- Location: Kajang, Selangor, Malaysia
- Colours: Yellow - Red - Blue
- Website: www.newera.edu.my/index.php

New Era University College
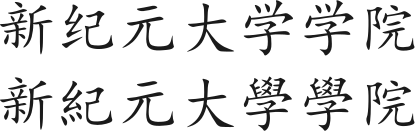
- New Era University College in Simplified Chinese (top) and Traditional Chinese character (below)
- Simplified Chinese: 新纪元大学学院
- Traditional Chinese: 新紀元大學學院
- Hanyu Pinyin: Xīn Jìyuán Dàxué Xuéyuàn
Transcriptions
Standard Mandarin
- Hanyu Pinyin: Xīn Jìyuán Dàxué Xuéyuàn

New Era University College (NEUC) is a private, non-profit higher education institution in Kajang, Selangor, Malaysia. It was founded on 28 May 1997.

NEUC is a LCCI Registered Training Centre (RTC), and also a Cisco Networking Academy, which teaches students networking and other information technology-related courses such as CCNA (Cisco Certified Network Associate) and CCNP (Cisco Certified Network Professional).

== History ==
Planning for the college started in earnest when a formal application for a College license was made in August 1994. After waiting for three years, the Malaysian Education Ministry eventually approved the college on 28 May 1997. The first intake of students at New Era College started their courses on 1 March 1998.

It was officially upgraded into a university college on 10 January 2017.

== Faculties ==
Location of New Era University College

There are four faculties and ten departments under New Era University College:

- Faculty of Accountancy, Management and Economics (FAME)
  - Department of Business Studies
  - Department of Finance & Accounting
- Faculty of Computer Science and Information Computing Technology (FICT)
  - Department of Information Computing Technology
- Faculty of Arts & Social Sciences (FASS)
  - Department of Chinese Language & Literature
  - Department of Education
  - Department of Guidance & Counselling Psychology
  - Department of Southeast Asian Studies
- Faculty of Media & Creative Arts (FMCA)
  - Department of Art & Design
  - Department of Drama & Visuals
  - Department of Media Studies

== New Era Institute of Vocational & Continuing Education (NEIVCE) ==
New Era University College owns New Era Institute of Vocational & Continuing Education (NEIVCE), which is a non-profit vocational college focus on vocational training.

NEIVCE is accredited by Awards For Training & Higher Education (ATHE), Chung Chou University of Science and Technology, Qualifi and West College Scotland, and regulated by Office of Qualifications and Examinations Regulation (Ofqual).

== See also ==
- List of universities in Malaysia
