= Hulu Langat District =

- District of Selangor
- Daerah Hulu Langat
- Interactive map of Hulu Langat District
- Location of Hulu Langat District in Malaysia
- Coordinates: 3°05′N 101°50′E
- Country: Malaysia
- State: Selangor
- Seat: Bandar Baru Bangi
- Local area government(s): Kajang Municipal Council (South); Ampang Jaya Municipal Council (North)

Government
  - District officer: Zul-Kefli@Zulkefli Khalid

Area
  - Total: 829.44 km^{2} (320.25 sq mi)

Population (2020)
  - Total: 1,400,461
  - Density: 1,688.4/km^{2} (4,373.0/sq mi)
- Time zone: UTC+8 (MST)
  - Summer (DST): UTC+8 (Not observed)
- Postcode: 43000 (Downtown Kajang); 43100 (Hulu Langat Town); 43200 (Cheras-Selangor, Bandar Tun Hussein Onn); 43500 (Semenyih, Broga-Selangor); 43600 (Bangi Lama); 43650 (Bandar Baru Bangi); 43700 (Beranang, Kampung Sungai Jai-Selangor); 55100 (Pandan Indah, Pandan Jaya); 55300 (Pandan Perdana); 56000 (Damai Perdana); 56100 (Cheras Baru, Bukit Teratai); 68000 (Downtown Ampang)
- Calling code: +6-03-4, +6-03-8, +6-03-9
- Vehicle registration plates: B

Hulu Langat District is a district of Malaysia located in the southeastern corner of Selangor, between Kuala Lumpur and Negeri Sembilan. It is bordered by the state of Pahang to the east and north, Gombak district to the north-west, Federal Territory of Kuala Lumpur and Petaling district to the west, Sepang district to the south-west, and state of Negeri Sembilan to the south.

Hulu Langat is the fifth largest district in Selangor State with an area of 840 square kilometres and the second most populous district with a population of 1,400,461 at the 2020 Census (provisional result). It is also the second most densely populated district with approximately 1688 people per km^{2}. It has a mix of urban and rural settlements with a majority of the population settling in towns near Kuala Lumpur. These population centers, such as Cheras and Ampang effectively became suburbs of the greater metropolitan area (both Cheras and Ampang are communities now divided administratively between Kuala Lumpur Federal Territory and Selangor State).

Hulu Langat has a median income of RM8361 (2019), which is the fourth highest in the state and country behind Petaling, Sepang and Gombak. The figure is higher than both the state, RM8210 (2019) and national median income of RM5873 (2019).

== Population ==
According to the Department of Statistics, Malaysia, Hulu Langat's population increased from 1,138,198 in 2010 to 1,400,416 in 2020.

Historical population
Year	Pop.	±%
1991	413,900	—
2000	864,451	+108.9%
2010	1,138,198	+31.7%
2020	1,400,461	+23.0%

The following is based on the Department of Statistics Malaysia 2020 forecast.

Ethnic groups in Hulu Langat, 2020 forecast
Ethnicity	Population	Percentage
Bumiputera	731,700	58.3%
Chinese	385,600	30.7%
Indian	122,400	9.8%
Others	14,400	1.1%

== Administrative divisions ==

Hulu Langat District is divided into 7 mukims, which are:

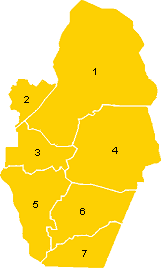
1. Hulu Langat; 2. Ampang; 3. Cheras; 4. Hulu Semenyih; 5. Kajang; 6. Semenyih; 7. Beranang

=== Local Area Government ===
1. Ampang Jaya Municipal Council (Mukim Ampang only)
2. Kajang Municipal Council (Most parts of the district except Mukim Ampang)

== Federal Parliament and State Assembly Seats ==
Hulu Langat, Selangor Parliament and State Assembly Electoral Districts

List of Hulu Langat district representatives in the Federal Parliament (Dewan Rakyat)

Parliament	Seat Name	Member of Parliament	Party
P099	Ampang	Rodziah Ismail	Pakatan Harapan (PKR)
P100	Pandan	vacant	—N/a
P101	Hulu Langat	Mohd Sany Hamzan	Pakatan Harapan (AMANAH)
P102	Bangi	Syahredzan Johan	Pakatan Harapan (DAP)
P103	Puchong	Yeo Bee Yin	Pakatan Harapan (DAP)

List of Hulu Langat district representatives in the State Legislative Assembly (Dewan Undangan Negeri)

Parliament	State	Seat Name	State Assemblyman	Party
P99	N20	Lembah Jaya	Syed Ahmad Syed Abdul Rahman Alhadad	Pakatan Harapan (PKR)
P100	N21	Pandan Indah	Izham Hashim	Pakatan Harapan (AMANAH)
P100	N22	Teratai	Yew Jia Haur	Pakatan Harapan (DAP)
P101	N23	Dusun Tua	Johan Abd Aziz	Barisan Nasional (UMNO)
P101	N24	Semenyih	Nushi Mahfodz	Perikatan Nasional (PAS)
P102	N25	Kajang	David Cheong Kian Young	Pakatan Harapan (PKR)
P102	N26	Sungai Ramal	Mohd Shafie Ngah	Perikatan Nasional (PAS)
P102	N27	Balakong	Wayne Ong Chun Wei	Pakatan Harapan (DAP)
P103	N28	Seri Kembangan	Wong Siew Ki	Pakatan Harapan (DAP)

== Transportation ==
=== Railways ===
- RapidKL 3 LRT Ampang Line
  - Maluri - Pandan Jaya - Pandan Indah - Cempaka - Cahaya - Ampang
- RapidKL 9 MRT Kajang Line
  - Taman Suntex - Sri Raya - Bandar Tun Hussein Onn - Batu 11 Cheras - Bukit Dukung - Sungai Jernih - Stadium Kajang - Kajang
- KTM Komuter 1 Batu Caves-Pulau Sebang Line
  - Kajang - Kajang 2 - UKM - Bangi
- KTM ETS Padang Besar/Butterworth - Gemas
  - Kajang

=== Bus ===
Hentian Kajang is the main bus terminal that provides access to both intercity and local destinations with Rapid Bus as the main service provider. Bus routes within the district fall under the Ampang Corridor and Cheras Corridor.

=== Highways ===
- East–West Link Expressway or Kuala Lumpur–Seremban Expressway
- Cheras–Kajang Expressway (Grand Saga Highway)
- Kajang Dispersal Link Expressway (SILK)
- Kajang–Seremban Highway (LEKAS)
- North–South Expressway Southern Route (PLUS)
- Sungai Besi–Ulu Klang Elevated Expressway (SUKE)
- Ampang–Kuala Lumpur Elevated Highway (AKLEH)
- East Klang Valley Expressway (EKVE), which connects Ukay Perdana, Ampang and Sungai Long, Kajang is currently under construction and is expected to be completed by 2024.

== Education ==
Hulu Langat District is home to a number of higher education institutions.

=== Public universities ===
- Universiti Kebangsaan Malaysia (UKM), Bangi

=== Private universities and university colleges ===
- Infrastructure University Kuala Lumpur (IUKL), Kajang
- German-Malaysian Institute (GMI), Bangi
- Universiti Tenaga Nasional (UNITEN), Kajang
- Kolej Universiti Islam Antarabangsa Selangor (KUIS), Kajang
- Universiti Tunku Abdul Rahman (UTAR), Sungai Long
- University of Nottingham (Malaysia campus), Semenyih
- New Era University College, Kajang

== Places of interest ==
Hulu Langat town is famous for its durians. This town is also popular for its recreational activities and natural surroundings. Due to its near location to the city of Kuala Lumpur Hulu Langat is a popular spot to the local tourist for recreational activities. Among the popular spots of eco-tourism are the Sungai Gabai Waterfalls, the Semenyih Water Reservoir and the Congkak River Forest Recreational Center. Another latest hot spot for tourism is the Sungai Lopoh, located at 22nd Mile of Jalan Hulu Langat and the Kuala Lumpur Look Out Point Tourist Complex, located at Jalan Ampang–Hulu Langat.

Near Lembah Pangsun lies Mount Nuang (1,483m), a training ground for hikers and runners before they climb Mount Kinabalu or do a marathon. There are two hots spring in Hulu Langat one is Dusun Tua Hot Spring located at 16th mile and Sungai Serai Hot Spring.

Balakong consists of various shopping malls that are frequented by tourists and locals, such as AEON (Jusco) Cheras Selatan Balakong.

Kajang town on the other hand is famous for its satay, which is very popular amongst the locals as well as tourists.

Pekan Batu 14 Hulu Langat

Pekan Batu 14 Hulu Langat is an old town which 14 miles from Kuala Lumpur.

Landmark

- Masjid Sultan Hisamuddin Alam Shah

- Dewan Dato Nazir Hulu Langat

- Balai Polis Pekan Batu 14 Hulu Langat

- Masjid Al-amin Kg Sungai Tekali

- Tokong Sam Ching Kong

Pekan Batu 18 Hulu Langat

Pekan Batu 18 Hulu Langat is an old town which 18 miles from Kuala Lumpur.

It is also a Famous Place for Cycling Gathering Point

Landmark

- Balai Polis Pekan Batu 18 Hulu Langat

- SJK (C) CHOON HWA

== Notable people from Hulu Langat ==
- Ning Baizura, singer, actress from Kajang
- Adnan Saidi, Malaysian war hero

== See also ==
- Districts of Malaysia
