= Stadium Kajang MRT station =

MRT station in Kuala Lumpur, Malaysia

KG34 Stadium Kajang
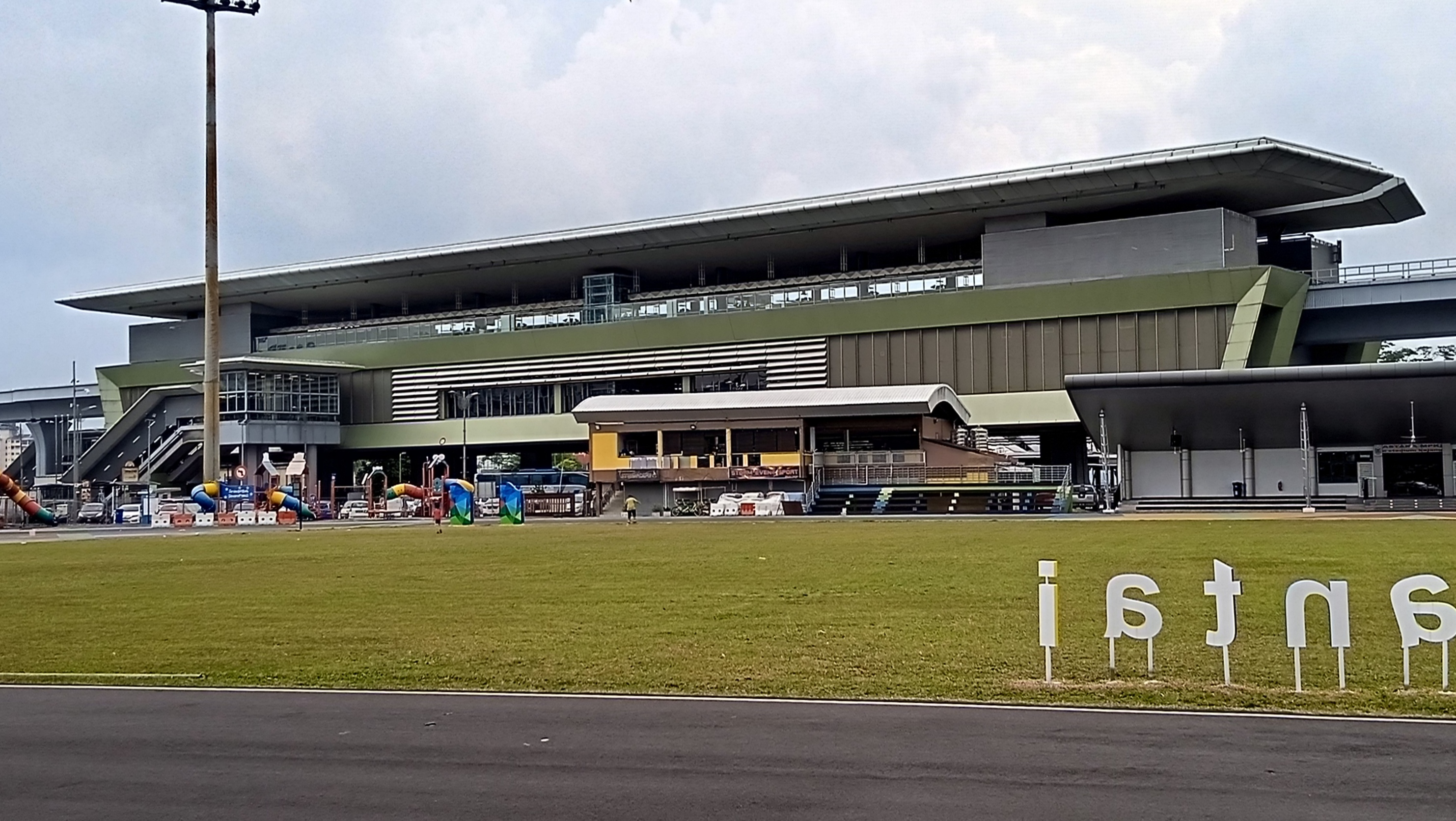
- View of the station.

General information
- Other names: Malay: ستاديوم کاجڠ (Jawi); Chinese: 加影体育场; Tamil: ஸ்டேடியம் காஜாங்
- Location: Jalan Stadium, Bandar Kajang, 43000 Kajang; Selangor; Malaysia
- Coordinates: 2°59′38.4″N 101°47′10.5″E
- System: Rapid KL
- Owner: MRT Corp
- Operator: Rapid Rail
- Line: 9 Kajang Line
- Platforms: 2 side platforms
- Tracks: 2

Construction
- Structure type: Elevated
- Parking: Not available
- Accessible: Yes

Other information
- Station code: KG34

History
- Opened: 17 July 2017; 9 years ago
- Former names: Bandar Kajang

Services
Preceding station		Following station
Sungai Jernih towards Kwasa Damansara	Kajang Line	Kajang Terminus
Location

The Stadium Kajang MRT station is an elevated mass rapid transit (MRT) station on the MRT Kajang Line, located in downtown Kajang, Selangor, Malaysia. It was opened on 17 July 2017, along with 19 adjoining stations (from Muzium Negara to Kajang) as part of Phase 2 of the system. It is the second-last station before the line terminates at Kajang.

The station stands close to the right bank of the Langat River. It is located adjacent to the Kajang Stadium (the station's namesake), as well as the Kajang RTM branch, the Bangunan Dato' Nazir building which houses Sate Kajang Haji Samuri, other satay stalls at Medan Sate Kajang, SJK (C) Yu Hua and SMJK Yu Hua schools. The station is also close to Kajang's historic core, the Sungai Chua ward and the junction between the Semenyih Highway and Jalan Reko.

During construction, the station was provisionally named Bandar Kajang, as it served the downtown area of Kajang; the adjoining Kajang station, despite its name, does not directly serve downtown Kajang. This is one of two stations serving Kajang's town centre, the other being Sungai Jernih.

== Station background ==
=== Station layout ===
The station has a layout and design similar to that of most other elevated stations on the line (except the terminal stations), with the platform level on the topmost floor, consisting of two sheltered side platforms along a double-tracked line and a single concourse housing ticketing facilities between the ground level and the platform level. All levels are linked by lifts, stairways and escalators.

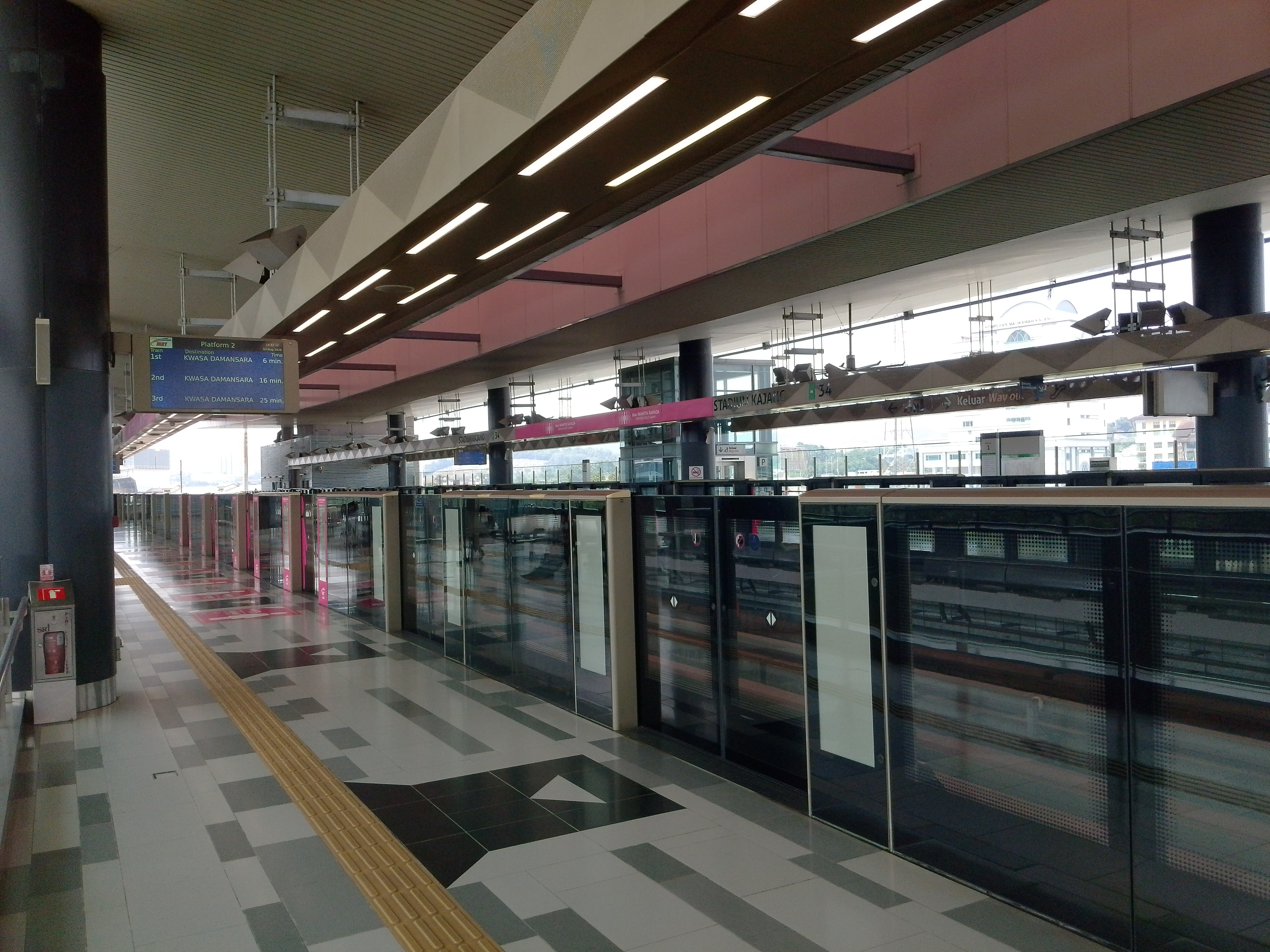
Stadium Kajang MRT Station Platform 2 heading to Kwasa Damansara

L2	Platform Level	Side platform
L2	Platform Level	Platform 1:	9 Kajang Line towards KG35 Kajang (→)
L2	Platform Level	Platform 2	9 Kajang Line towards KG04 Kwasa Damansara (←)
L2	Platform Level	Side platform
L1	Concourse	Faregates, Ticketing Machines, Customer Service Office, Station Control, Shops
G	Ground Level	Entrances A, B and C, Feeder bus hub, Taxi and e-hailing vehicle lay-by, Stadium Kajang, Jalan Stadium

=== Exits and entrances ===
The station has three entrances. The feeder buses operate from the station's feeder bus hub at Entrance A on Jalan Stadium.

Kajang Line station
Entrance	Location	Destination	Picture
A	Jalan Stadium	Feeder bus hub, taxi and private vehicle lay-by, Stadium Kajang, Sate Kajang Haji Samuri	
B	Lorong Mendaling	Alleys behind Jalan Mendaling.	
C	Jalan Stadium-Jalan Mendaling Crossroads	Alternative entrance to Entrance A as it is located at the same side with Entrance A.	

== Bus services ==
=== MRT Feeder Bus services ===
With the opening of the MRT Kajang Line, feeder buses also began operating, linking the station with several housing areas and towns around the Kajang area. The feeder buses operate from the station's feeder bus hub at Entrance A of the station.

Route No.	Origin	Destination	Via	Image
T451	KG34 Stadium Kajang	National University of Malaysia (UKM)	Jalan Besar, Kajang; KB06 KG35 Kajang; Jalan Reko; Reko Sentral; KB06A Kajang 2 Hentian Kajang; Sungai Tangkas; KB07 UKM	
T457	KG34 Stadium Kajang	Prima Saujana	Jalan Sungai Kantan; Desa Sri Jenaris; Mutiara Avenue; Persiaran Prima Saujana	
T458	KG34 Stadium Kajang	Taman Indah	Menara MPKj; Tengku Permaisuri Norashikin Hospital (Kajang Hospital); Jalan Semenyih; Jalan Sungai Jelok; Taman Kajang Baru; Jalan Berlian 1	
T459	KG34 Stadium Kajang	Taman Jasmin	Jalan Timur; Jalan Semenyih; Taman Jasmin; Flat Bukit Mewah; Jalan Bukit Mewah 41	
T460	KG34 Stadium Kajang	Bandar Teknologi Kajang	Menara MPKj; Tengku Permaisuri Norashikin Hospital (Kajang Hospital); Jalan Semenyih; Jalan Bandar Teknologi; Perindustrian Seksyen 4 Hillview Residence; Jalan 3/20	
T464	KG34 Stadium Kajang	Teras Jernang	KB06 KG35 Kajang; Hentian Kajang; UKM; Bangi Gateway; LHDN Bangi; Saville Kajang	
T465	KG34 Stadium Kajang	Jade Hills	Sungai Chua; Bukit Angkat	

=== Other bus services ===
The MRT station also is also served by some other bus services passing by the station.

Route No.	Operator	Origin	Destination	Via	Notes
KJ01	Rapid KL	Hentian Kajang	Bandar Kajang	Bangi Seksyen 4 Tambahan; Bangi Seksyen 7 Taman Koperasi LLN; Flat Sri Saga; Winnie Plaza; KG34 Stadium Kajang; Jalan Timur; Tengku Permaisuri Norashikin Hospital (Kajang Hospital); Jalan Besar	For Kajang Hospital-bound only.
450	Rapid KL	Hentian Kajang	Hub Lebuh Pudu	Reko Sentral; Bandar Kajang; KG34 Stadium Kajang; KG33 Sungai Jernih; Sungai Sekamat; Simpang Balak; KG31 Bukit Dukung; Cheras–Kajang Expressway; Batu 9 Cheras / Taman Suntex; Cheras Sentral / KG26 Taman Connaught; FT 1 Cheras Highway (Jalan Cheras); KG24 Taman Midah; Jalan Cheras; AG13 KG22 Maluri; Jalan Pasar; Jalan Pudu	For KL-bound only.
T450	Rapid KL	KG34 Stadium Kajang	Beranang	Jalan Besar; Semenyih; Bandar Rinching	North Terminal station
