= Lembah Jaya =

Township in Selangor, Malaysia

Lembah Jaya is a township in Selangor, Malaysia, located near Ampang.
