= Dusun Tua =

Village in Hulu Langat, Selangor, Malaysia

Coordinates: 3°08′N 101°50′E

Dusun Tua is a small village in Hulu Langat district, Selangor, Malaysia.
