= Semenyih =

Semenyih Bandar Semenyih
- Town
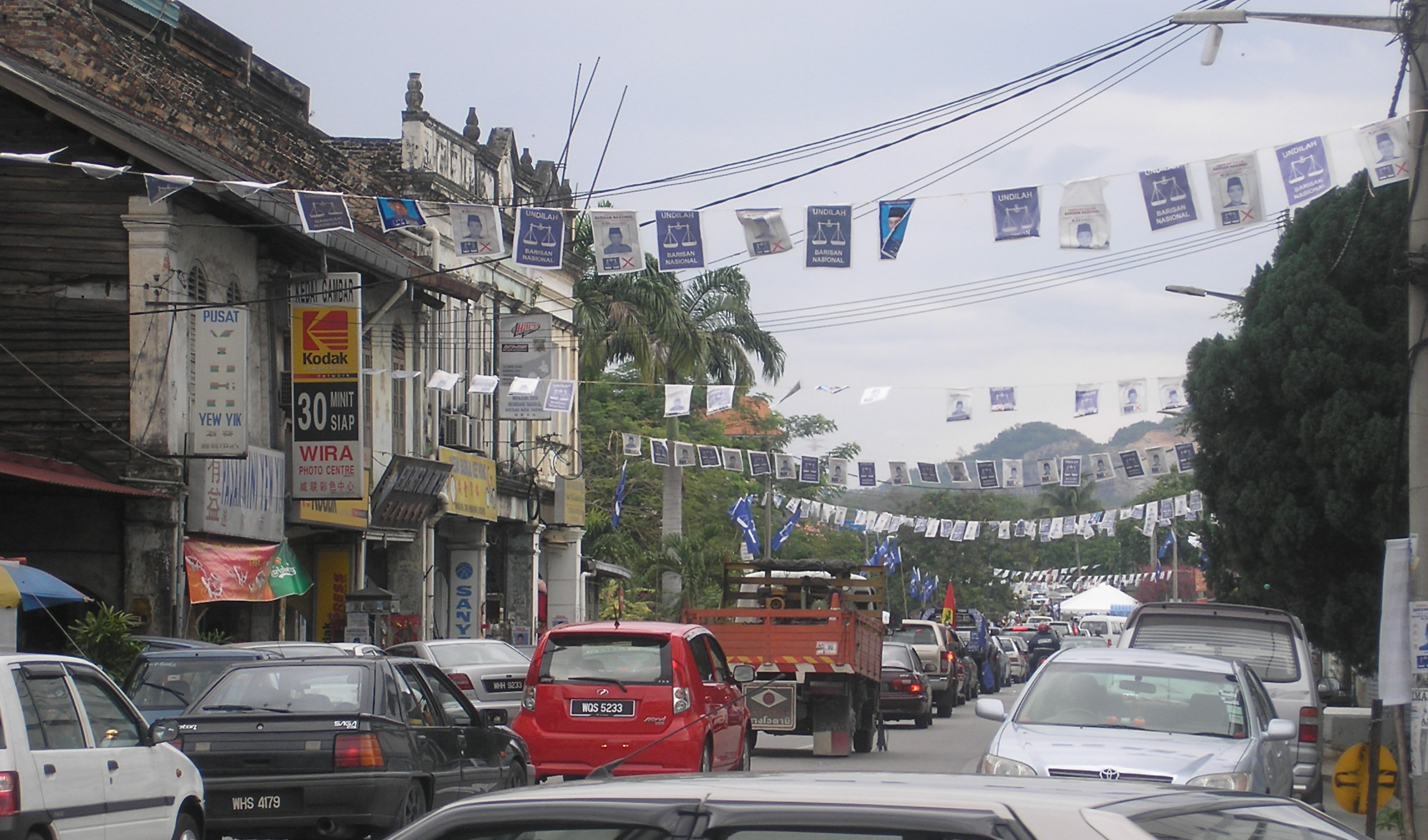

- Flag

- Location within Malaysia
- Coordinates: 2°56′50″N 101°50′45″E
- Country: Malaysia
- State: Selangor
- District: Hulu Langat
- Mukim: Bandar Semenyih
- Time zone: UTC+8 (MST)
  - Summer (DST): Not observed
- Website: http://www.mpkj.gov.my

Semenyih in Hulu Langat District

Semenyih is a town and a mukim in Hulu Langat District in southeastern Selangor, Malaysia along the Kajang–Seremban road. It is 28 km (17 mi) southeast of downtown Kuala Lumpur and 8 km (5.0 mi) southeast of Kajang.

== Etymology ==
The meaning of the name of the town is uncertain and it does not appear in any dictionary. It was derived from the locals and is related to its past. According to an oral story, it is based from a word in the Negeri Sembilan dialect, meaning "hidden" – the standard Malay word for "hidden" is sembunyi.

== Geography ==
The surrounding area is hilly, the highest peak nearby is Bukit Arang, 560 m (1,840 ft) high. This makes the area home to numerous scenic waterfalls. A more popular tourist attraction in the town is the Ostrich Wonderland Show Farm. The town is becoming more accessible, with new highways (such as the Kajang–Seremban Highway and the Kajang SILK Highway). New development such as the University of Nottingham Malaysia Campus, has contributed to the growth in population. The 15,100 people recorded in the 1991 census had grown to over 45,000 by 2000. This corresponds to an annual growth rate of 12.9%, compared with the national average of 2.66% over the same period.

=== Incinerator project ===
A 1.5 billion ringgit incinerator project was planned for a site between Semenyih and nearby Broga by the federal government. In early 2005, a temporary injunction was issued, stopping work on the project, in response to a lawsuit by residents of the two towns. The project has since been scrapped.

=== Bandar Sunway Semenyih ===
Bandar Sunway Semenyih is a new township located along the Kajang-Semenyih road (federal highway 1).

The township construction has been planned in 19 phases. As of 2008 seven phases had been completed. Facilities include a clubhouse with a swimming pool and coffee house. A river runs through the township.

== Education ==
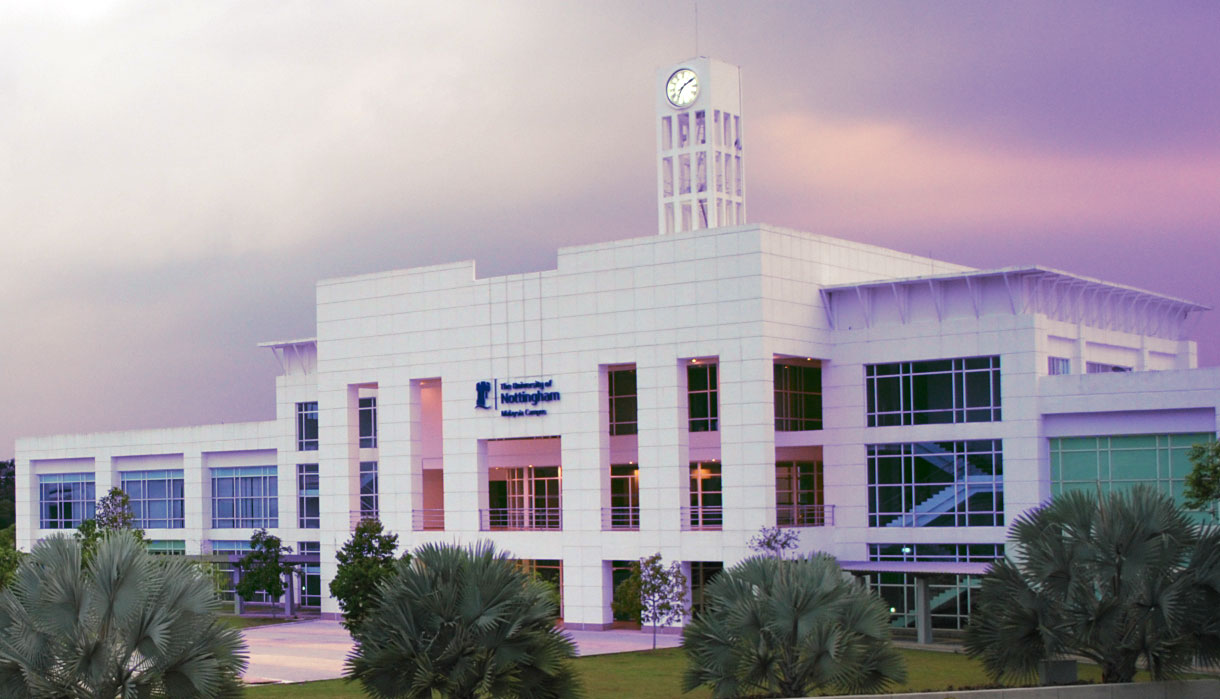
University of Nottingham

- Sekolah Kebangsaan Semenyih
- University of Nottingham Malaysia Campus
- Sekolah Menengah Kebangsaan Bandar Rinching
- Sekolah Kebangsaan Bandar Rinching
- Sekolah Menengah Engku Husain
- Sekolah Kebangsaan Hulu Semenyih
- Tenby Setia Ecohill
- SJK(C) Sin Ming Semenyih
- Maverick International Secondary School
- Sekolah Kebangsaan Taman Pelangi Semenyih

== Transportation ==
=== Car ===
Semenyih is mainly served by federal highway 1. Highway 31, traversing the Langat valley, starts here and connects to Bangi, Putrajaya (precinct 20), Dengkil and Banting.

Tolled expressways serving Semenyih include the Kajang-Seremban Expressway (LEKAS).

=== Public transportation ===
Semenyih is served by the UNMC-Kajang Shuttle Bus, going from University of Nottingham's campus near Broga to Kajang MRT/railway station.

RapidKL bus T450 connects Semenyih town to Stadium Kajang MRT station.
