= Kajang =

Town in Selangor, Malaysia

- Town
- Kajang Town; Bandar Kajang
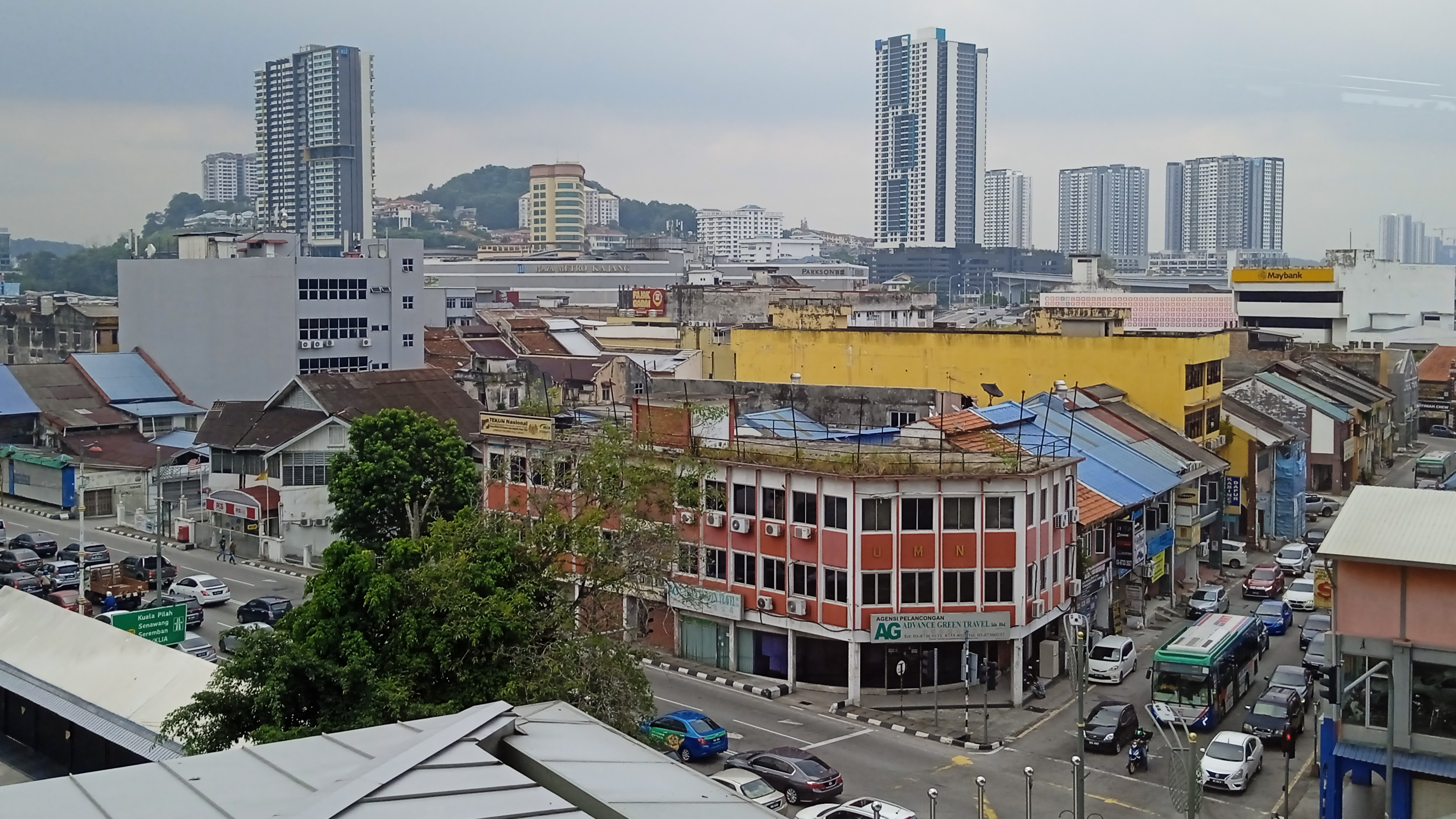

- Seal
- Motto(s): Kajang Bandar Pilihan untuk Didiami (Kajang: The Ideal City for Living)
- Interactive map of Kajang
- Location within Selangor Location within Malaysia Location within Southeast Asia
- Coordinates: 2°59′35″N 101°47′20″E
- Country: Malaysia
- State: Selangor
- Establishment: 1709
- Granted municipal status: 1 January 1997
- Granted city status: TBA

Government
  - Yang Di-Pertua (President): Nazli Md Taib

Area
  - Town: 787 km^{2} (304 sq mi)

Population (2020)
  - Town: 236,240
  - Density: 1,326/km^{2} (3,430/sq mi)
  - Metro: 1,047,356
- Time zone: UTC+8 (MST)
  - Summer (DST): Not observed
- Postal codes in Malaysia: 43000 (Downtown Kajang); 43100 (Hulu Langat Town, Sungai Gabai); 43200 (Batu 9 Cheras, Bandar Tun Hussein Onn); 43500 (Semenyih, Broga-Selangor); 43600 (Universiti Kebangsaan Malaysia, Bangi Lama); 43650 (Bandar Baru Bangi); 43700 (Beranang, Kampung Sungai Jai-Selangor); 56000 (Damai Perdana)
- Calling code: +60-3-87 +60-3-89 +60-3-90
- Website: www.mpkj.gov.my

Kajang is a town in the Hulu Langat District, located at the southeast part of Selangor, Malaysia, and further southeast of Federal Territory of Kuala Lumpur. Kajang, along with much of the Hulu Langat District, is governed by the Kajang Municipal Council. Kajang town is located on the eastern banks of the Langat River. It is surrounded by Cheras, Semenyih, Bangi, Putrajaya and Seri Kembangan.

According to the 2020 census, the local authority area (which includes Kajang, Cheras, Balakong, Bangi, Semenyih and Pekan Hulu Langat) has a population of 1.05 million people, making it the second largest city in Malaysia.

== Etymology ==
The name Kajang is believed to have originated from the language of Temuan tribes (Orang Asli) who populated the Langat valley in the 17th-18th centuries. In their language, kajang referred to their art of weaving screwpine or pandanus leaves, which were prevalent in much of the country. A similar theory stated that settlers from the neighboring domain of Sungai Ujong (Negeri Sembilan) once constructed huts (pondok) in the area with thatched roof made from folded (lipat kajang) screwpine leaves.

It is also believed that the name kajang may have originated from the Buginese word berkajang, meaning camp or accommodation.

== Geography and urban growth ==
Kajang lies in the central section of Hulu Langat District, roughly 22 kilometres (14 mi) southeast of downtown Kuala Lumpur. The town connects to the capital via Federal Route 1, the Cheras–Kajang Expressway, and the 9 Kajang Line MRT. Regional access across the southern Klang Valley is provided by the Kajang Dispersal Link Expressway (SILK), Kajang–Seremban Highway (LEKAS), and the North–South Expressway Southern Route.

The town originally expanded around its historic riverine core along the Langat River. From the 1970s onward, surrounding rubber estates and tin-mining tracts were steadily converted into planned suburban townships, starting with Bandar Baru Bangi. Subsequent waves of development created extensive residential and commercial suburbs including Sungai Chua, Sungai Jelok, Prima Saujana, Saujana Impian, Kajang Utama, Jade Hills, and Kajang 2. Today, the wider municipal territory administered by the Kajang Municipal Council (MPKj) extends across Hulu Langat District, taking in Semenyih, Beranang, and parts of Cheras.

Urban renewal efforts focus on revitalising the 54-hectare historic core as an integrated arts, cultural, and culinary precinct, balancing commercial activity with heritage conservation and pedestrian links.

== History ==
Orang Asli tribes had already established settlements in what is now Kajang as early as the 16th century, however the first recorded settlement was found in 1709 by additional Orang Asli settlers who relocated from the Klang Valley. Kajang town in its present form was founded in the 1870s, in the aftermath of the Klang War. In its early days, it was settled by Mandailings and Minangkabau people from Sumatra in the then-Dutch East Indies, followed by Chinese tin miners.

As with other towns in Selangor, Kajang as a modern town owes its rise in particular to tin mines and plantations which were opened around the 1890s. A famous coffee estates was Inch Kenneth Estate managed by the Kindersley brothers, who were among the first to plant rubber in the country on a commercial basis.

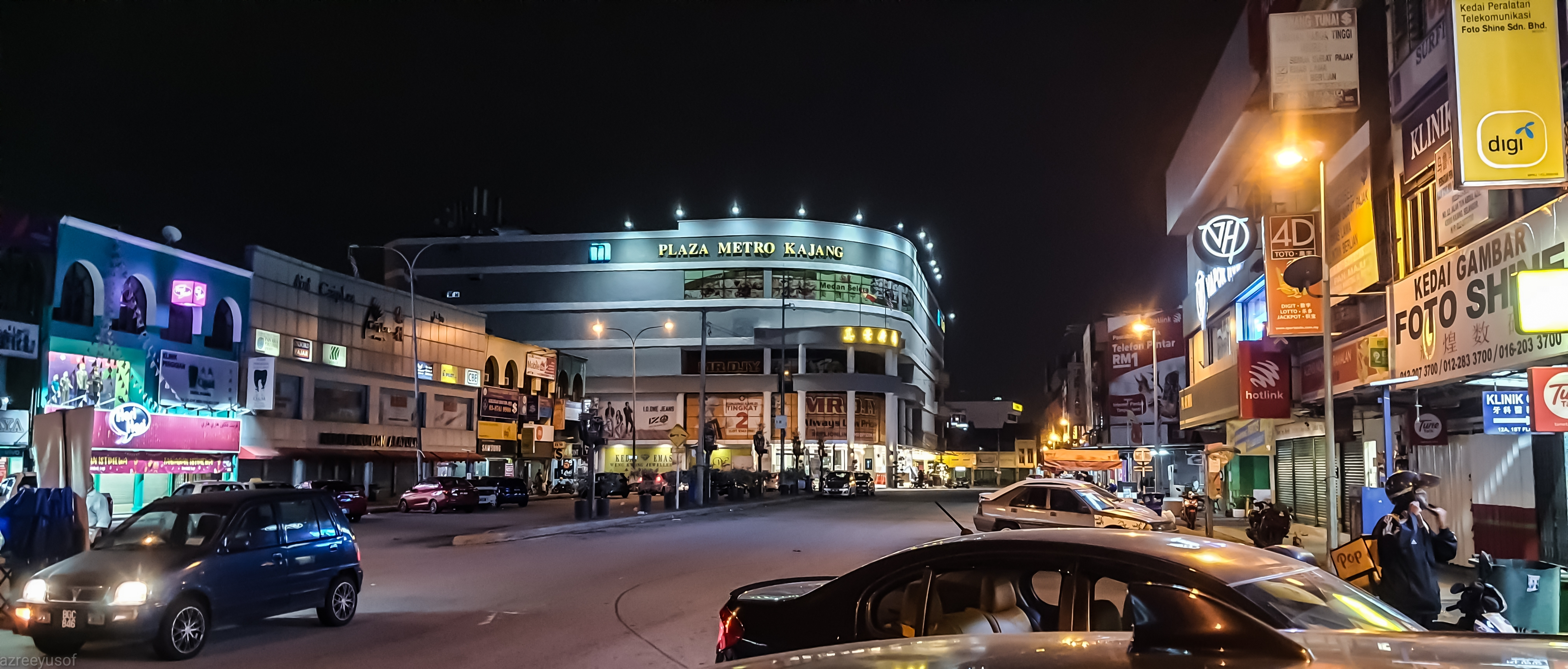
Kajang town at night, with Metro Plaza Kajang in the background

During the Japanese invasion, Kajang was bombed on 12 January 1942, a day after the fall of Kuala Lumpur. The bombs, meant for the railway station, missed its target, and hit a nearby church instead.

In 1948, a Communist insurgency against British forces and their allies across Malaya began, which led to the Malayan Emergency with fighting soon spreading to Kajang. Guerrilla leader Lau Yew died in combat just outside Kajang in July 1948; British forces photographed his corpse and printed the image onto leaflets to distribute around Kajang.

Kajang was granted municipal status on 1 January 1997. Previously it was under the jurisdiction of the Hulu Langat District Council (Majlis Daerah Hulu Langat, MDHL). Kajang was the administrative centre of the Hulu Langat region until it was relocated to Bandar Baru Bangi in 1992.

== Demographics ==
In the 2020 census, the Kajang Municipal Council is home to 1.05 million people, making it Malaysia's second most populous local authority after Kuala Lumpur. Over 350,000 people reside in the town itself and its immediate suburbs.

Kajang's main population centres are Sg. Sekamat, Taman Saujana Impian, Sg. Kantan, Sg. Jelok, Sg. Ramal, Sungai Chua, Jalan Reko, Jalan Bukit, Taman Jenaris, Taman Prima Saujana, Taman Kantan Permai, Taman Kajang Perdana, Taman Sri Ramal, Taman Bukit Mewah, Kajang Prima, Bandar Teknologi Kajang, Hillpark, Bandar Sungai Long and Bandar Baru Bangi.

Malay	43.66%
Other Bumiputeras	2.46%
Chinese	35.34%
Indians	9.74%
Others	0.6%
Non-Malaysians	8.2%

== Landmarks ==
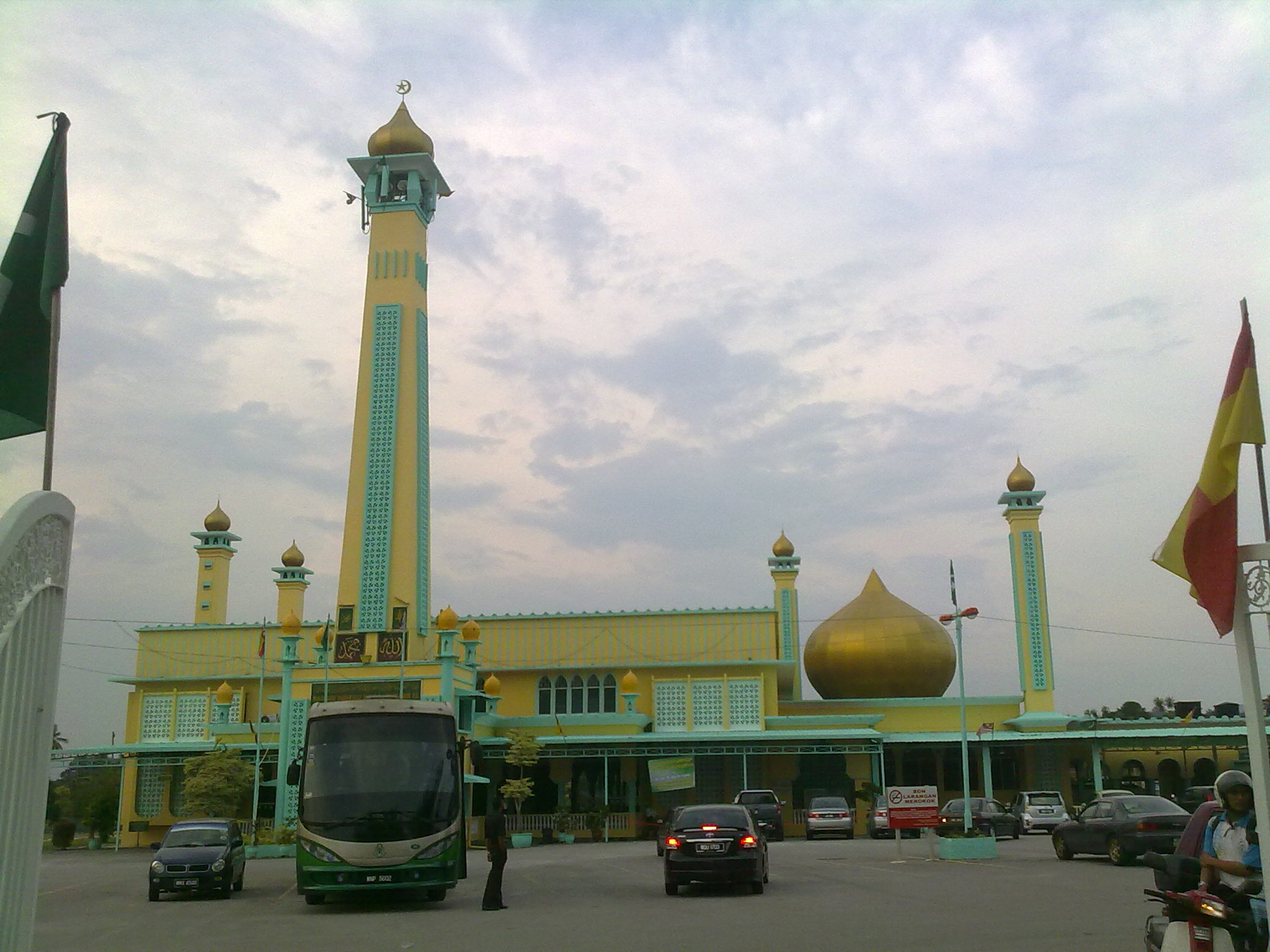
Kajang Jamek Mosque

The historic town centre surrounds Stadium Kajang MRT station, focused on Jalan Mendaling, Jalan Sulaiman, Jalan Tengah, Jalan Besar, and Jalan Raja Haroun. Rows of pre-war shophouses define the streetscapes, reflecting the town's prominence as a commercial and transport node during the late 19th and early 20th centuries.

Key civic and cultural landmarks in the town centre include:

- Kajang Stadium, a traditional hub for community sports and open-air public events
- Kajang Jamek Mosque
- Historic colonial-era post office and police station
- Former Ulu Langat District Office
- Traditional shophouse streets along Jalan Mendaling and Jalan Tukang

== Transportation ==
=== Vehicles ===
Kajang is connected by a network of tolled expressways and federal highways.

Federal Route 1, the premier north–south federal route of Peninsular Malaysia, runs through downtown Kajang as Jalan Cheras from Cheras until Sungai Jernih and Stadium Kajang, and then southwards as Jalan Semenyih from Stadium Kajang until Semenyih, Beranang and neighbouring Seremban, Negeri Sembilan, with the rest of the route terminating in Johor Bahru, Johor – the route's southern terminus. On Federal Route 1, Kajang is 22 km from Kuala Lumpur, 8 km from Semenyih, and 43 km from Seremban.

A stretch of Federal Route 1 is concurrent with the Cheras–Kajang Expressway (also known as the Grand Saga Expressway) between Taman Connaught and Bukit Dukung. The Kajang Dispersal Link Expressway (SILK) starts in Seri Kembangan, which then runs through Balakong and then forms a beltway around downtown Kajang before ending near Bandar Baru Bangi. It is the main ring road for Kajang.

PLUS Expressway exit 210 (Kajang Interchange) serves the vicinity of Kajang and Bangi. It also links the expressway to the SILK Expressway and the South Klang Valley Expressway (SKVE), as well as Selangor State Route B11, which runs concurrently with the SILK and SKVE expressways from the SKVE's Serdang Interchange at Seri Kembangan until the SILK's Sungai Chua Interchange at Kajang, before being detoured out of the SILK after the interchange. State Route B11 continues on its own separate route until its terminus at Stadium Kajang just before the intersection with Jalan Cheras, Jalan Semenyih and Jalan Reko.

From Ampang Jaya, one can reach Kajang with state routes B62 and B52.

=== Public transport ===
The Kajang railway station is the principal rail station of Kajang. It is an interchange station between the MRT Kajang Line, KTM Batu Caves–Pulau Sebang Line and KTM ETS. The station is the southern terminus of the MRT Kajang Line.

Kajang station, though so named, does not directly serve downtown Kajang; the Stadium Kajang MRT station is located in the actual downtown area, along with the Sungai Jernih MRT station. Meanwhile, the Bukit Dukung MRT station directly serves the Sungai Sekamat area and the northern parts of Kajang via MRT bus routes.

== Food and culture ==
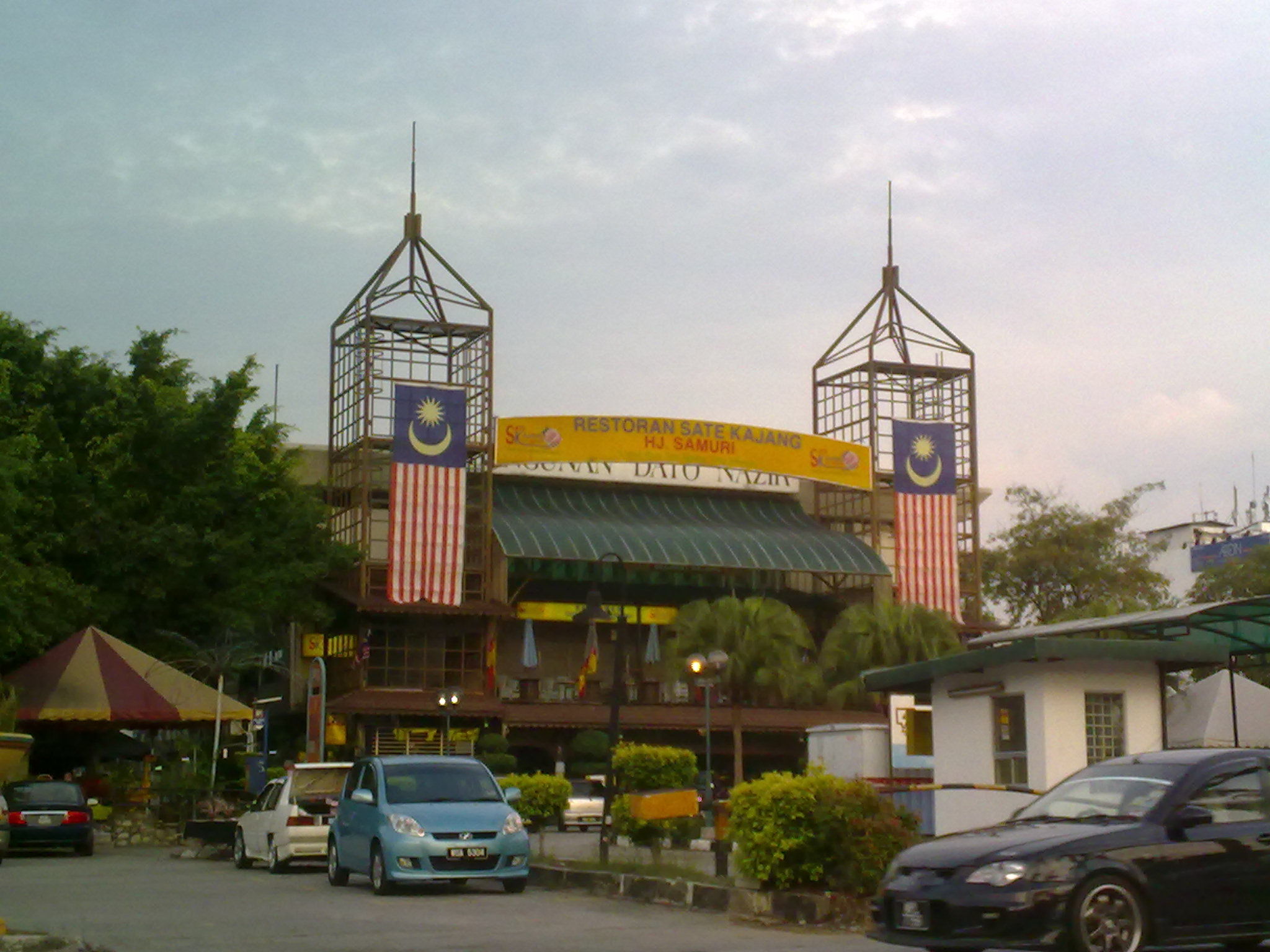
Sate Kajang served at Dato' Nazir Building (Medan Sate), where Sate Kajang Haji Samuri is situated

Kajang is widely known across Malaysia as Bandar Sate ("Satay Town"), celebrated for its distinct style of skewered meat served with thick peanut-and-chilli gravy and pressed rice cubes (ketupat). In June 2025, the Selangor state government formally gazetted Sate Kajang as one of the state's heritage foods. Medan Sate Kajang and numerous heritage restaurants in the old town serve as prime culinary destinations for visitors from throughout the Klang Valley..

== Government and infrastructure ==
The Malaysia Prison Complex (Kompleks Penjara Kajang), Prison Department of Malaysia is headquartered in Kajang.

== Shopping ==
Lotus's Kajang in Saujana Impian, Kajang

Kajang has multiple shopping complexes, amongst them is the Billion Shopping Center formerly in Kajang town, which has since been relocated to Bandar Teknologi Kajang. Other shopping centres located in Kajang are Plaza Metro Kajang, Metro Point and Kompleks Kota Kajang. Metro Avenue is a new shopping district located opposite SMJK Yu Hua Kajang and Kajang High School.

== Facilities and amenities ==
Kajang Hospital is the primary public hospital located in the eastern part of the town. It is the oldest hospital in the town, built alongside with its founding in 1889.

Private medical centres function 24 hours and include facilities such as Poliklinik MUC @Metro Point, Klinik Mediviron Prima Saujana, Kajang Plaza Medical Centre (KPMC), and KPJ Kajang Specialist Hospital.

The Hulu Langat District police headquarters are located in the town centre, across the Highway 1 junction from the post office. Federal government agencies with their branch in Kajang include the National Registration Department, Immigration Department, Transportation Department, and Hulu Langat Education Office.

== Education ==
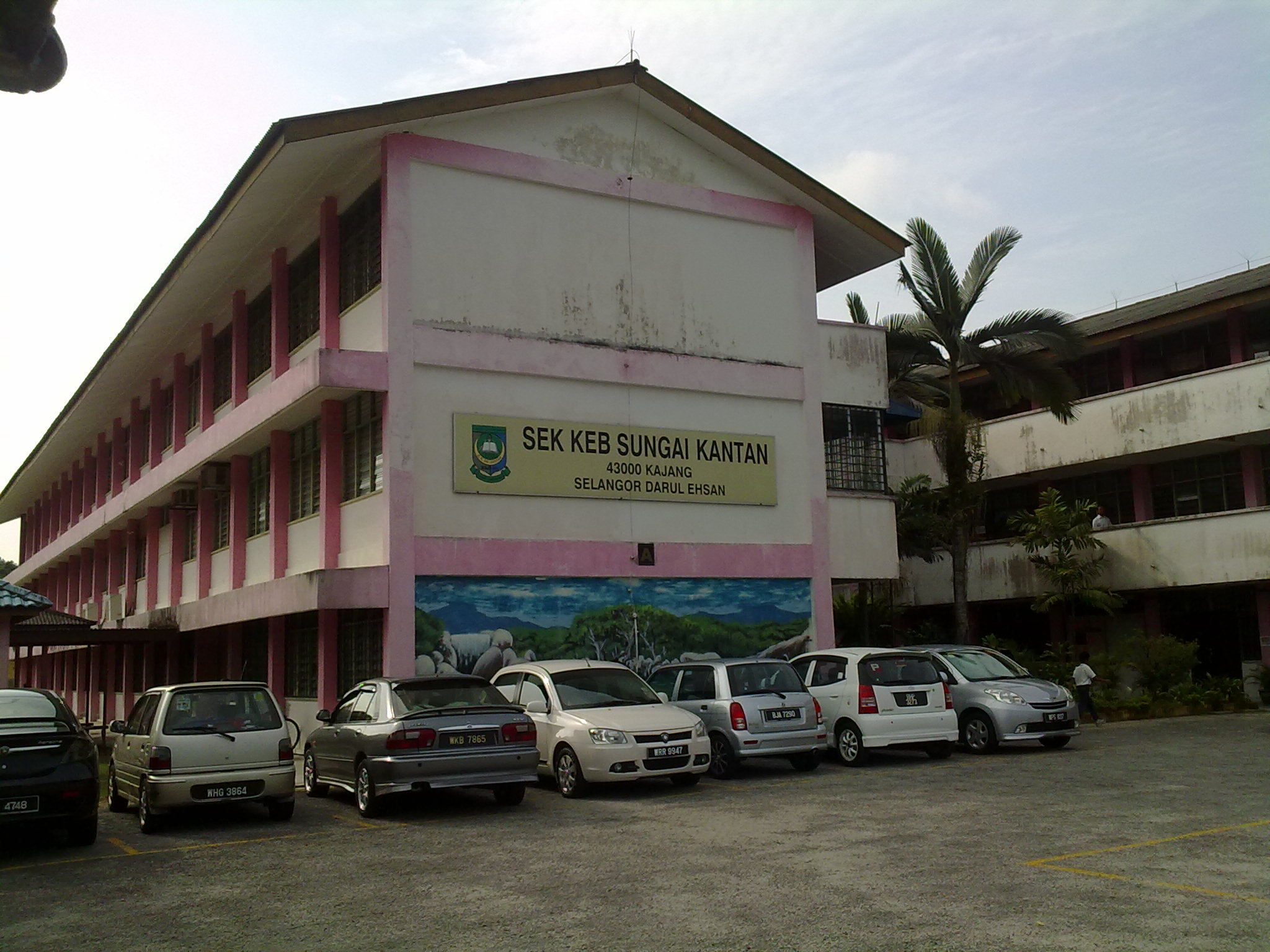
SK Sungai Kantan

=== Primary ===
- Al-Amin Sungai Tangkas
- Rafflesia International School Kajang 2
- SK Bandar Seri Putra
- SK Jalan Bukit 1
- SK Jalan Bukit 2
- SK Jalan Semenyih 1
- SK Jalan Semenyih 2
- SK Kajang
- SK Kajang Utama
- SK Kantan Permai
- SK Leftenan Adnan
- SK Saujana Impian
- SK Saujana Impian 2
- SK Seri Sekamat
- SK Taman Jasmin
- SK Taman Sri Jelok
- SRJK(C) Yu Hua
- SRJK(C) Yu Hua 2 (under construction)
- SRJK(C) Sungai Chua
- SRJK(T) Kajang
- Tanarata International Schools
- SK Convent Kajang
- SK Taman Rakan
- SK Sungai Long

=== Secondary ===
- Rafflesia International School@Kajang 2
- SMK Convent Kajang
- SM Integrasi Tahfiz Ilmuwan Bangi
- SM Rafflesia@Kajang 2
- SM Teknik Kajang
- SMAP Kajang
- SMJK Yu Hua Kajang
- SMK Jalan Bukit
- SMK Jalan Reko
- SMK Kajang Utama
- SMK Saujana Impian
- SMK Sultan Abdul Aziz Shah (SAAS)
- SMK Sungai Ramal (SEMARAK)
- SMK Taman Jasmin 2
- SMK Tinggi Kajang (Kajang High School)
- SMKA Maahad Hamidiah
- Tanarata International Schools
- Sekolah Menengah Islam Sri Al-Amin Bangi
- SMK Bandar Baru Sungai Long
- SMK Bandar Lama Sungai Long
- SMK Bandar Lama Sungai Medium 3
- SMK Bandar Baru Sungai Pendek
- MRSM Sungai Long
- SMJKT Bandar Lama Sungai Pendek 2
- SMK Long River
- St. Long River Institution
- SMK Sungai Panjang
- SMK Sungai Biasa-Biasa
- Kolej Vokasional Sungai Long Panjang dan Pendek

=== Tertiary ===
New Era University College

Kajang is home to institutions of higher learning, which includes:

- Universiti Tunku Abdul Rahman (UTAR) Sungai Long Campus
- Universiti Tenaga Nasional
- Infrastructure University Kuala Lumpur
- New Era University College
- German-Malaysian Institute
- Universiti Kuala Lumpur Malaysia France Institute (MFI)
- Universiti Kuala Lumpur Medical Science and Technology (MESTECH)
- Universiti Kebangsaan Malaysia (UKM)

== Politics ==
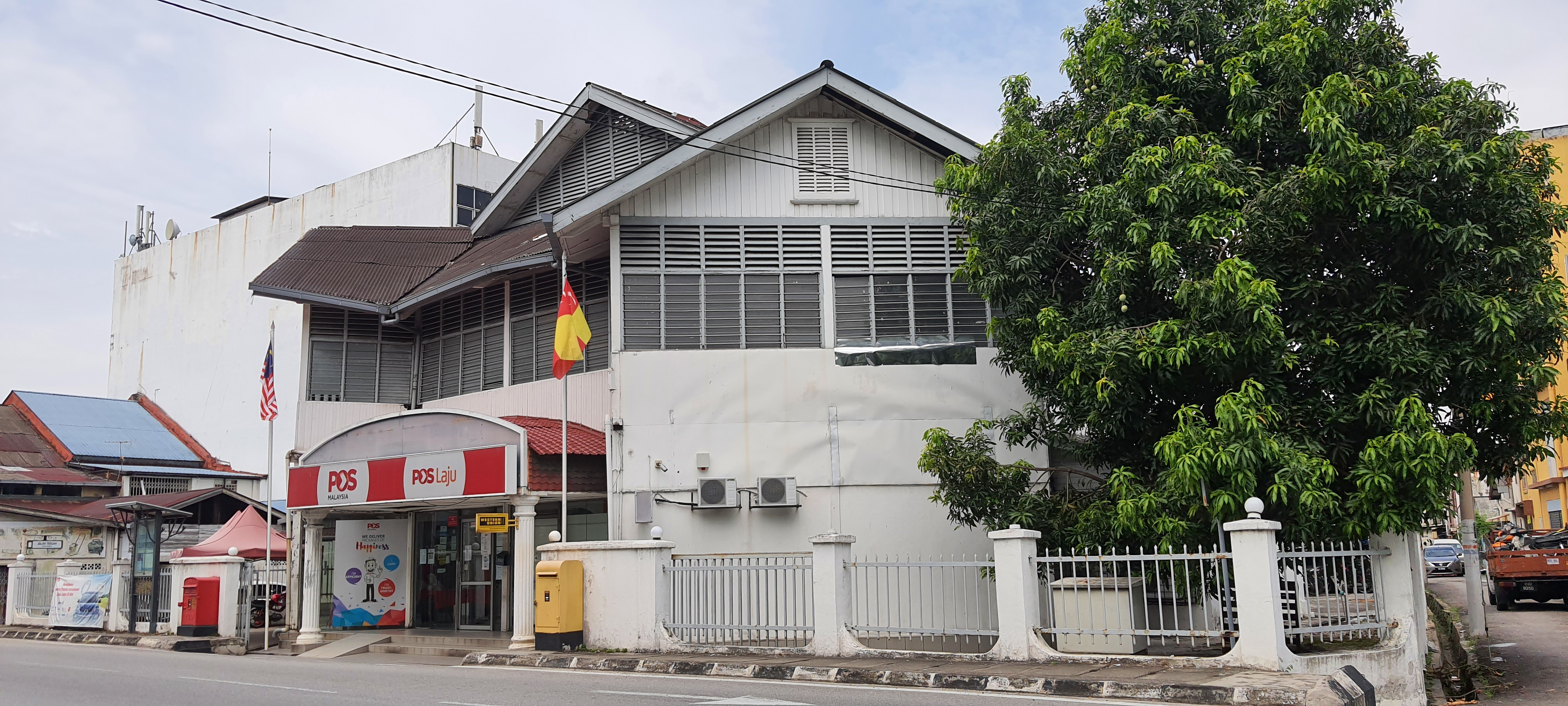
The Kajang Town post office, built in 1914.

Kajang is a state seat in the Selangor State Legislative Assembly and one of three state seats within the Bangi parliamentary seat in the Dewan Rakyat of the Parliament besides Balakong and Sungai Ramal. Bangi has been represented by Member of Parliament (MP) Syahredzan Johan of Pakatan Harapan (PH) since 2022 and Kajang has been represented by Member of the Legislative Assembly (MLA) David Cheong Kian Young of PH since 2023.

Before that, Kajang was one of the state seats within the Hulu Langat parliamentary seat in the Dewan Rakyat of the Parliament besides Semenyih and Dusun Tua.

== Notable people ==
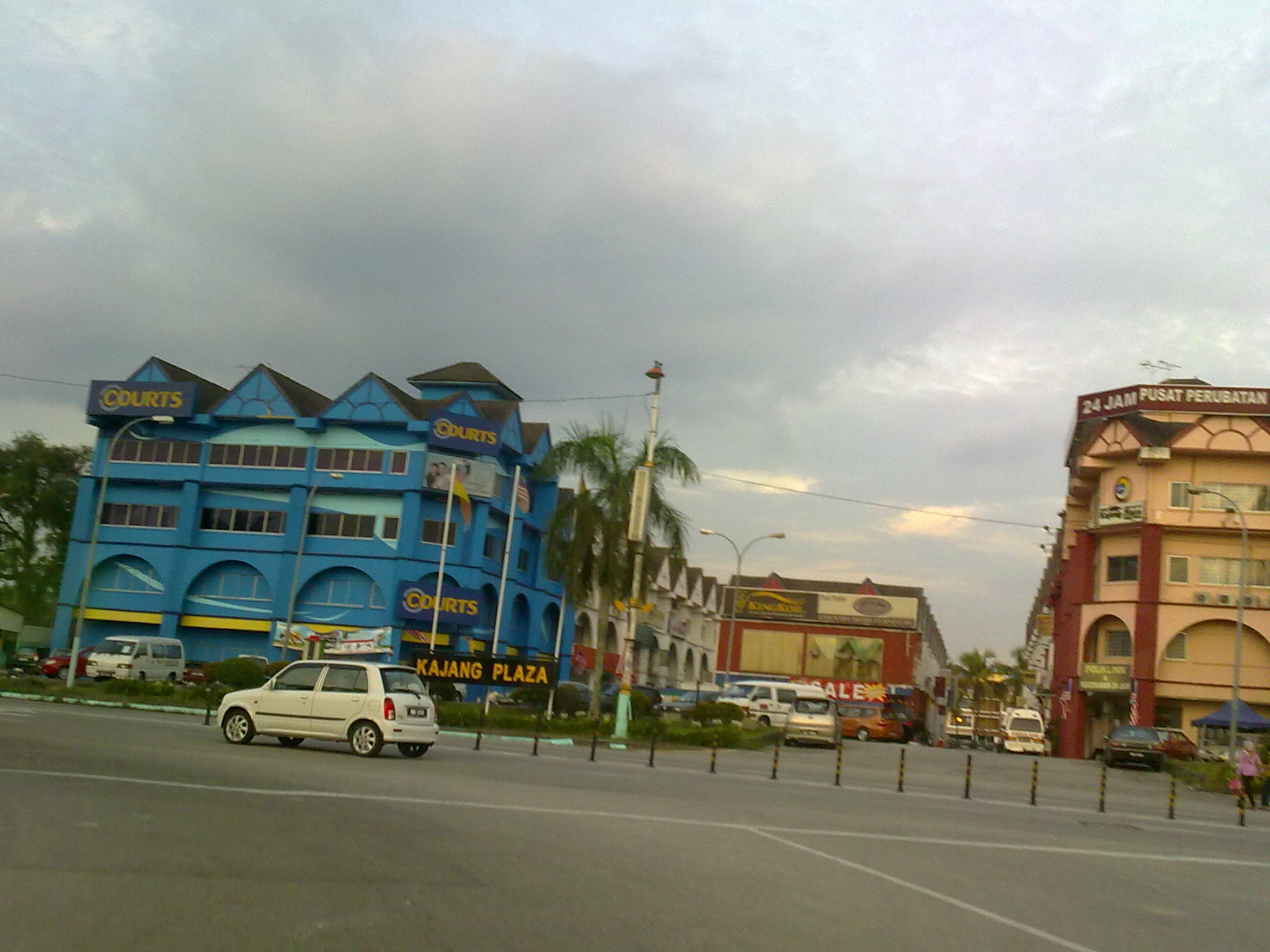
Kajang Plaza

- Lt Adnan Bin Saidi, Malayan military officer who took part in the Battle of Singapore, Bukit Chandu during World War II.
- Datuk Ramli bin Ibrahim, Malaysian choreographer.
- Ning Baizura, singer.
- Nora Danish, actress.
- Suresh Navaratnam, Malaysian cricketer, represented Malaysia for 21 years and captained the National Team.
- K. Sanbagamaran, former Selangor FA and Malaysia national football team player.
- D. Christie Jayaseelan, football player.
- K. Reuben, football player.
- Safee Sali, football player.
