= Gabai River =

River in Negeri Sembilan and Selangor, Malaysia

Coordinates: 03°09.97′N 101°54.52′E

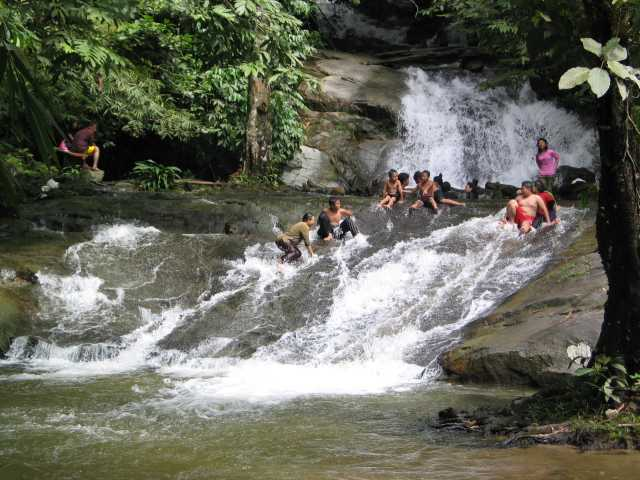
- Gabai Waterfall
- Native name: Sungai Gabai (Malay)

Location
- Country: Malaysia
- State(s): Negeri Sembilan and Selangor

Physical characteristics
- Source: Mount Besar Hantu
  - location: Kenaboi, Jelebu District, Negeri Sembilan
- Mouth
  - location: Hulu Langat, Selangor

The Gabai River (Malay: Sungai Gabai; Jawi: سوڠاي ڬباي), a minor river in the Langat River basin, flows from the 1,462-metre-high (4,797 ft) Mount Besar Hantu in the state of Negeri Sembilan into the dipterocarp forest reserve of the Hulu Langat district in the adjacent state of Selangor.

== Gabai Falls ==
In Hulu Langat, the river descends in a set of waterfalls known as the Gabai Falls (Malay: Air Terjun Sungai Gabai), a popular attraction for the locals, but relatively unknown with tourists. A cemented path leads from the parking to the lower falls. Along the path several shelters have been built. The upper falls can be reached by trails.

== See also ==
- Geography of Malaysia
- List of waterfalls
