= North Toronto Collegiate Institute =

Location
- 17 Broadway Avenue; Toronto, Ontario, M4P 1T7; Canada; 43.708951°N 79.396729°W

Information
- School type: High School
- Motto: Labor Omnia Vincit (Work conquers all)
- Founded: 1912
- School board: Toronto District School Board (Toronto Board of Education)
- Superintendent: Cassandra Alviani-Alvarez
- Area trustee: Shelley Laskin
- School number: 5540 / 930504
- Principal: Jane Lee
- Grades: 9-12
- Enrolment: 1382 (2019-20)
- Language: English
- Colours: Red and Grey
- Mascot: Norseman
- Team name: North Toronto Norsemen
- Website: northtorontoci.ca

North Toronto Collegiate Institute (NTCI) is a semestered, public high school with over 1,200 students located in the North Toronto area of Toronto, Ontario, Canada. The school is operated and governed by the Toronto District School Board. From its founding in 1912 until 1998, it was overseen by the Toronto Board of Education.

The school is located in Midtown Toronto in the Yonge and Eglinton neighbourhood. The majority of students come from the surrounding Chaplin Estates, Lytton Park, Mount Pleasant, Davisville Village, Bayview Avenue, Moore Park, Lawrence Park, Broadway Avenue and St. Clair Avenue areas. All students have North Toronto CI as their home school. The closest TTC subway station is Eglinton station. The school's motto is Labor Omnia Vincit, which is Latin for 'Work conquers all'. North Toronto CI celebrated its 100th anniversary in May 2012.

== History ==
North Toronto High School was founded in 1910 and was traditionally housed in the North Toronto Town Hall. The original two-storey school building had five rooms, and it was completed in 1912 (the same year that the town of North Toronto became part of the City of Toronto). Later, the school was renovated in 1914 by Charles Hartnoll Bishop to include a third storey and became the north side of the old building, once the south section was built. Other additions included the 1956 math (east) wing, swimming pool, cafeteria and auditorium, as well as the science wing in 1966–1967.

== New building ==
By 2002, North Toronto CI had one of the oldest buildings in the TDSB, and it was in need of major repair. A planning process was undertaken to build a new school. Due to a lack of available capital funding from the school board, a decision was taken in 2003 to seek private investment to augment funding committed by the TDSB. Subsequently, Tridel, a large Canadian condominium development corporation, bought 0.7 acres of land from the TDSB for $23 million. Groundbreaking occurred on November 21, 2007, a year after the project had originally been slated for completion. During construction, the school remained open to students because the new building was built on the location of the old sports field. The old building was later demolished and turned into a turf field and track.

Architectural aspects of the old Collegiate Gothic building were preserved in the new building's courtyard. Tridel built two condominiums, which are 24 (25 Broadway Ave) and 27 (70 Roehampton Ave) stories high. The new school was opened in September 2010, and the condominiums and the school's new field in October 2011. Its gymnasium and exercise room are located in the basement. The new four-storey building, which cost an estimated $52 million, features a rooftop garden, equipped science labs, a full gymnasium, change rooms, exercise room, an underground parking lot, a cafeteria, and school-wide Wi-Fi.

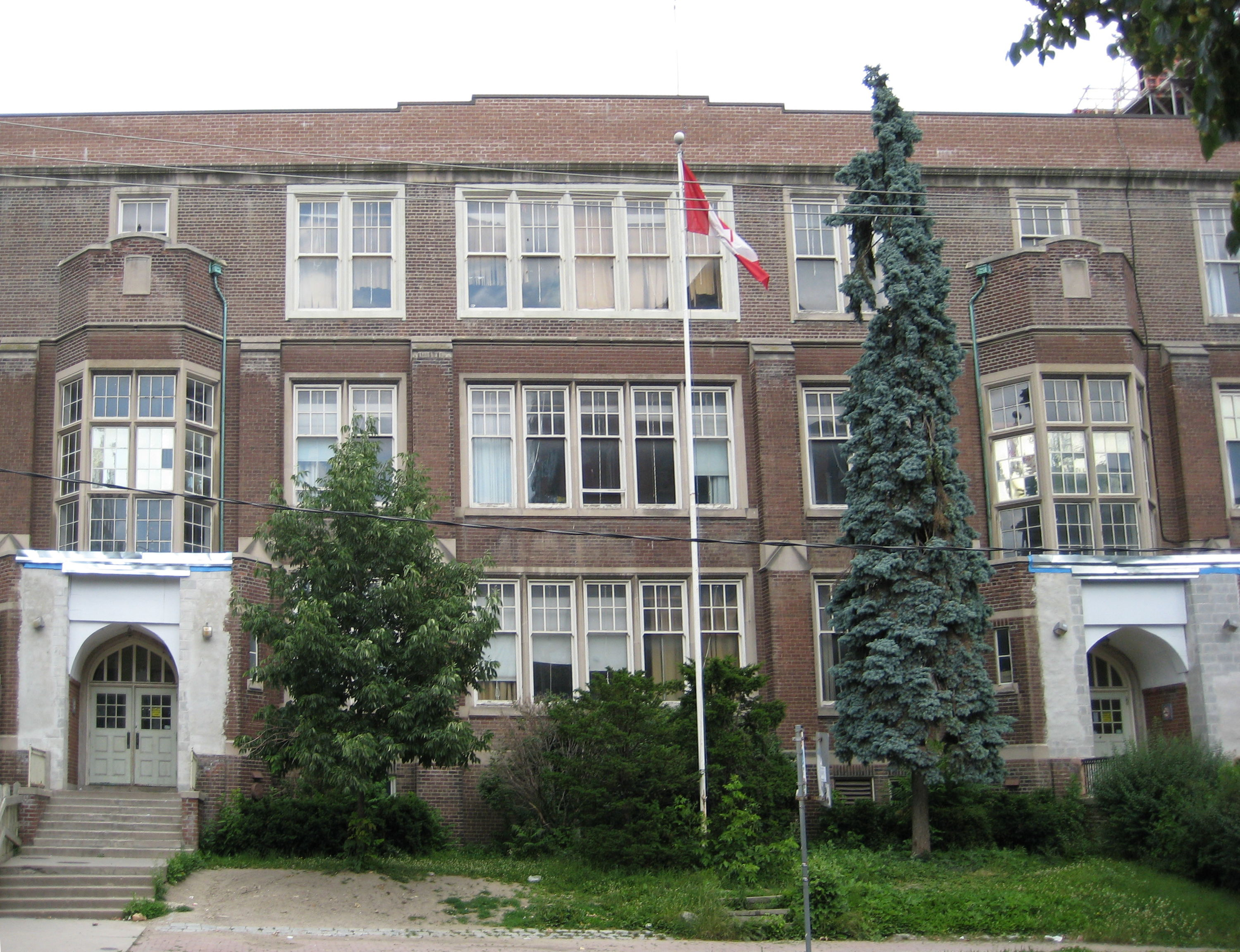
The old building in 2009, at the Roehampton Avenue entrance

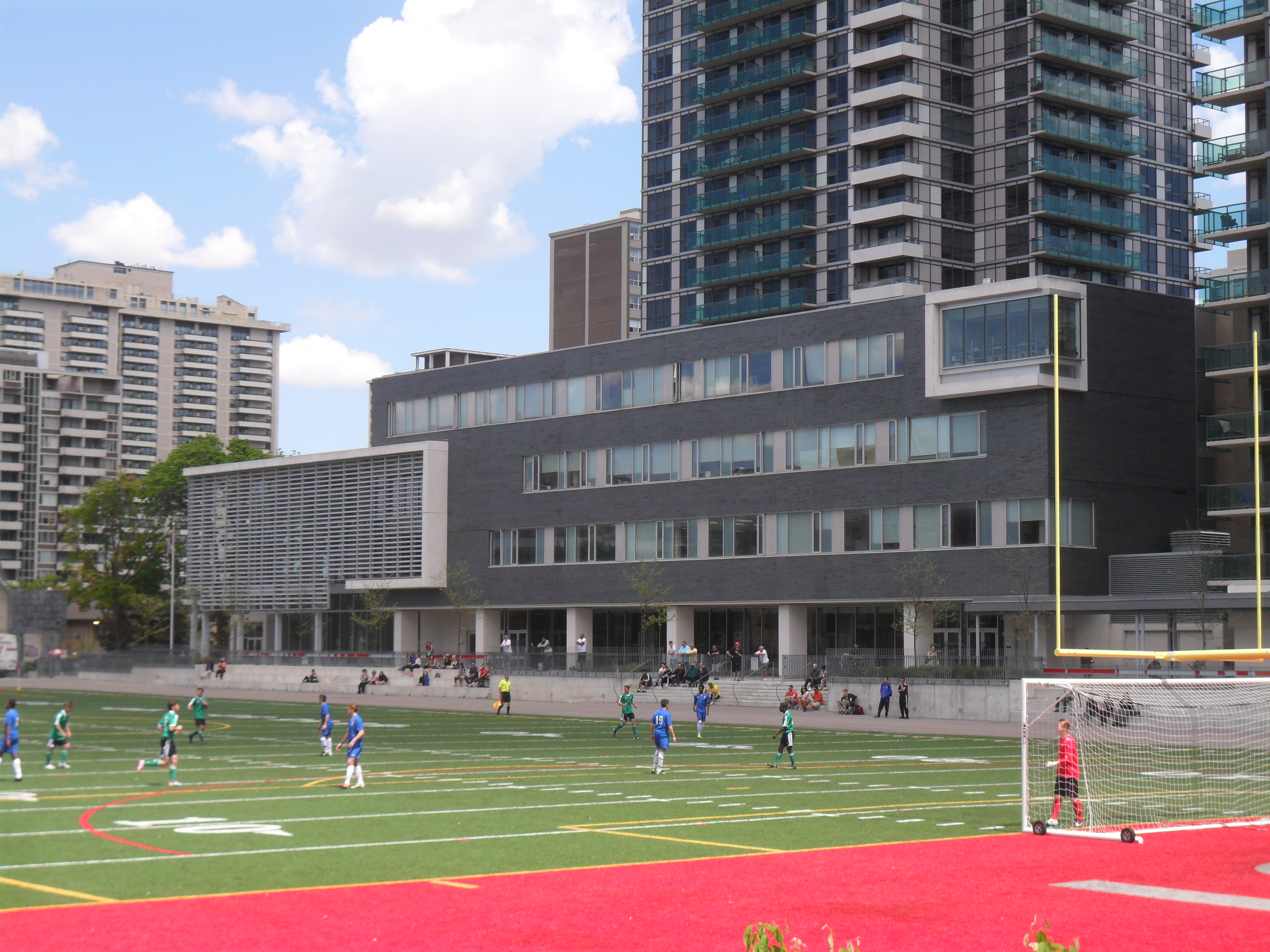
The school's new building and sports field

== Charity Week ==
Each year, North Toronto CI runs Charity Week to raise money for a charitable foundation that is selected annually by all students. Money is raised through student-organized events, such as home-form booths and specialty shows. Charity Week is spearheaded by the two Student Council vice-presidents, who also lead the Charity Week Committee.

Year	Amount Raised ($CAD)	Charity
2007-2008	$40,000	Stephen Lewis Foundation
2008-2009	$40,000	Childhood Cancer Canada
2009-2010	$40,000	Not for Sale
2010-2011	$45,000	War Child Canada
2011-2012	$51,910	Spread the Net
2012-2013	$30,000	Blessings in a Backpack Canada
2013-2014	$50,000	Make-A-Wish Canada
2015-2016	$23,000	Ryan's Well Foundation
2016-2017	$12,000	The Maddie Project
2017-2018	$12,500	Horizons for Youth
2018-2019	$12,500	Forests Ontario

== Sports ==
North Toronto CI has 50 sports teams, in addition to multiple sports clubs and intramural leagues. Sports teams are classified as "major" or "minor", depending on the commitment levels required by the team. Students are not allowed to join two major teams in one season.

The North Toronto CI's boys' varsity ice hockey team won the TDSSA championship in 2012, for the first time since 1994 and 1952. The North Toronto CI's girls' field hockey team won the TDSSA championship in 2005, 2006, and 2008.

In the 2010/11, the North Toronto junior girls' basketball team won the City of Toronto championship. In 2005 and 2006, The TDSB Tier 2 senior boys' rugby league team won two championships after back-to-back undefeated seasons.

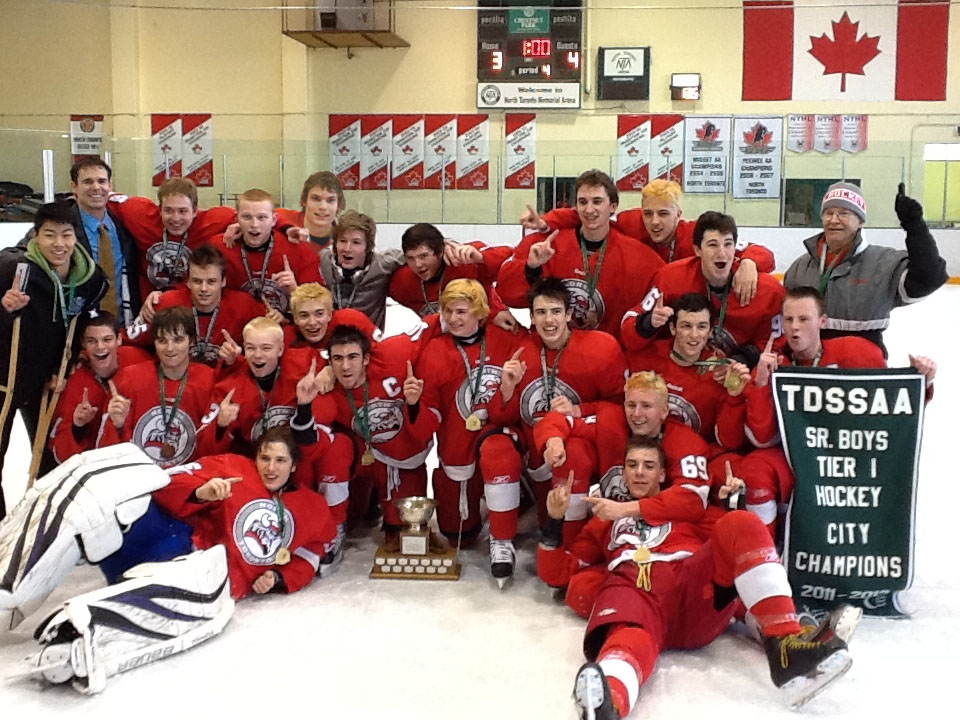
North Toronto varsity hockey team, TDSSAA City Champions 2012

On Tuesday, March 6, 2012, the North Toronto varsity boys hockey team won the TDSSAA City Championship and qualified for Ontario Federation of School Athletic Associations in Peterborough, Ontario. This was North Toronto's first varsity hockey championship since 1952 and first ever OFSAA appearance.

=== Fall sports ===
- Basketball
- Cross Country Running
- Field Hockey
- Ultimate Frisbee
- Golf
- Tennis
- Volleyball
- Soccer

=== Winter sports ===
- Archery
- Alpine Skiing
- Basketball
- Indoor Soccer
- Snowboard Racing
- Ice Hockey
- Swimming
- Volleyball
- Badminton

=== Spring sports ===
- Baseball
- Co-ed Volleyball
- Co-ed Tennis
- Soccer
- Softball
- Table Tennis
- Track & Field
- Ultimate Frisbee

== Clubs, councils, and publications ==
=== Clubs ===
North Toronto CI provides students with academic and special interest club opportunities.

- Aerospace & Rocketry Club
- Anime Manga Club
- Archery Club
- Badminton Club
- Business Club
- Card Games Club
- Chemistry Club
- Chess Club
- Classics Club
- Computer Science Club
- Bio Club
- Debate Club
- Drama Club
- Economics and Finance Club
- Esports Club
- French Club
- Gay Straight Alliance (GSA)
- Model U.N. Club
- Pingpong Club
- Reach For The Top
- Robotics Club - Team 820 DeltaTech
- Salt and Light Club
- Spanish Club
- Stage Crew
- Student Action Team
- Tea Club
- TEDx (independently organized TED event) Club

=== Councils ===
North Toronto CI's Student Council is composed of democratically elected executive members and a general assembly. There are ten Student Council executive members, who meet weekly and are responsible for student advocacy, school assemblies, and club funding. The general assembly is made up of home-form representatives, who convene monthly with the executive in order to relay the concerns of students. The school's Music Council organizes fundraising events and other activities for music students, such as Music Carnival and the Charity Week Talent Show. The North Toronto Athletic Association (NTAA) meets weekly and organizes sports-related events, including all intramural leagues and the school's Red and Grey Day, an annual tradition that includes multiple sports games and home-form contests. The North Toronto Environmental Action Team (NEAT) is composed of an executive team and general members, who work towards creating an environmentally-friendly community. The council is also responsible for hosting the annual Earth Week activities. The Art Council is made up of an executive team and class representatives from each art class, who work on multiple events each year, including Soda Pop Shop. The presidents of Music Council, Art Council, NTAA, and NEAT also sit on the Student Council.

- Student Council
- North Toronto Environmental Action Team (NEAT)
- Music Council
- North Toronto Athletic Association (NTAA)
- Art Council

=== Publications ===
The school has three publications, the school sponsored newspaper, Graffiti, the bi-weekly newsletter, the Red and Grey (also known as the RAG), and the yearbook, Pentagon. Graffiti is produced entirely by volunteers, while students studying Writer's Craft constitute the Red and Grey's staff and students in the Yearbook class constitute the Pentagon's staff.

Graffiti is North Toronto CI's award-winning newspaper. It was founded in 1981 and publishes four or five times each school year and also maintains a website. The publication is produced by over 30 student volunteers. Graffiti has been recognized at the Toronto Star High School Journalism Awards for excellence in student journalism. Most recently in 2019, it won nine awards, including Best High School Newspaper - Over 15 Staff.

== Music program ==
North Toronto CI is very well known for its music programs. The music program supports several musical ensembles.

- Junior Band
- Junior Strings Ensemble
- Symphonic Band
- Senior Strings Ensemble
- Marching Band
- Stage Band
- Symphony Orchestra
- Chamber Strings Ensemble
- Choral Ensemble
- Men's Chorus
- Chamber Choir
- Concert Band
- Pop Ensemble

The ensembles participate in various musical events and competitions, including the Kiwanis Music Festival, the Ontario Vocal Festival, the Ontario Strings Association Music Festival, and the Contemporary Music Showcase. The school puts on two major concerts each year. Fall Fare is in December and is a one night concert, while Maytime Melodies, an annual tradition dating back to 1946, is spread out over two nights. Students taking a music class are allowed to participate in or try out for any of these musical ensembles, provided they participate in the musical ensemble associated with their music class. In addition, the music department partners with the visual art department each year to host Soda Pop Shop, a one night showcase of student performers and artwork.

North Toronto is one of the only high schools in the GTA with a performance Marching Band. The band practices weekly before school from September to November to prepare for its annual appearance in the Toronto and Markham Santa Claus Parades.

== Awards ==
The School gives out yearly awards to recognize the best students in sports, academics, music, drama, and citizenship. Some notable awards include the following:

- Sifton Trophy for School Citizenship
- Kerr Trophy for Student Leadership
- R.R.H. (Bud) Page Valedictory Prize
- Governor General's Academic Medal
- Sakhawalkar-Bhatt Citizenship Award
- John Taylor Award
- Senator Keith Davey Award

In its first year in a Gold LEED Facility, North Toronto CI attained the EcoSchools Gold Certification. In 2018, the school was upgraded to EcoSchools Platinum Certification.

== Notable alumni ==
- Mike Hoecht — Canadian-born American football defensive tackle and EDGE for the Los Angeles Rams (2020-2024); EDGE for the Buffalo Bills (2025-) of the National Football League
- Malin Åkerman — Hollywood actress, attended NTCI during the mid-1990s
- Christie Blatchford — graduated 1970, newspaper columnist for The National Post
- Dinah Christie — singer, comedian, and Canadian television personality; graduated 1961
- Joe Cressy — Canadian politician, graduated 2003
- David Cronenberg — filmmaker, graduated with an average of 80% or higher (Ontario Scholar Status)
- Jim Cuddy — member of Blue Rodeo; member of the NTCI football team
- Keith Davey — member, Order of Canada, former Canadian Football League (CFL) commissioner, former Canadian Senator
- Tom Europe — CFL player (also attended Northern Secondary School)
- Megan Follows — graduated 1986, actress, Anne of Green Gables
- Camilla Gibb — attended 1982-1986, winner, 2000 City of Toronto Book Award
- Alice Glass — lead singer of Crystal Castles, left in 2003
- Ryan Hinds — DB for the Hamilton Tiger Cats
- Karl Jaffary — former municipal politician
- Rebecca Jenkins — actress and singer
- Shaf Keshavjee — global leader in lung transplants and thoracic surgery
- Greg Keelor — member of Blue Rodeo, member of NTCI football
- Jennifer Lanthier — children's author
- Henry Lau — singer, attended NTCI in grade 9; ex-member of South Korean boy band Super Junior-M
- Dan Levy — television host, writer, and actor
- Doug Lewis — graduated 1957, held several cabinet posts in the Mulroney government
- Eric Lindros — former NHL player
- Victor Ling — officer, Order of Canada, cancer researcher; graduated 1962
- Milosh — electronic musician
- Ken Money — graduated 1948, scientist and athlete
- Nash the Slash — musician
- Roger Neilson — graduated 1951, coach, National Hockey League (NHL)
- Eric Pacey — National Lacrosse League player, former Toronto Rock player, attended North Toronto for 4 years during the 90's
- Saša Petricic — graduated 1982, reporter, CBC News
- Keanu Reeves — actor, attended NTCI for grade nine
- Dave Sapunjis — graduated 1986, CFL player (Calgary), Grey Cup Most Valuable Canadian 1991, 1992, 1995
- Brit Selby (faculty) — former NHL player and Calder Memorial Trophy winner for the league's top rookie as a member of the Toronto Maple Leafs in 1965–1966, taught history classes at the school
- Keith Spicer — graduated 1952, first Official Languages Commissioner appointed in Canada, former Canadian Radio-television and Telecommunications Commission chairman, former editor of the Ottawa Citizen
- Amanda Tapping — actress and producer, class of 1984
- Bill Watters — staff 1966–1970, assistant president of the Toronto Maple Leafs and owner of the Toronto Rock
- Howard P. Whidden (1871-1952) — NTCI football team, 6th Chancellor at McMaster, has a residence hall named after him; House of Commons of Canada for four years
- Vassy Kapelos — graduated 2000, Canadian political journalist, CTV News
- Eric Nesterenko (1933–2022) — NHL ice hockey centre for the Toronto Maple Leafs and the Chicago Black Hawks

== See also ==
- Education in Ontario
- List of secondary schools in Ontario
