= GBAS =

GBAS may refer to:

- NIPSNAP2, a gene which is also called GBAS
- Ground-based augmentation system, satellite navigation system
