= Malcolm Sutherland-Foggio =

American activist

- Born: April 4, 1998 (age 28); Morristown, New Jersey

Malcolm Sutherland-Foggio was born on April 4, 1998, in Morristown, New Jersey. He is the Founder and Ex Officio Chairman of Make Some Noise: Cure Kids Cancer Foundation, Inc., a 501(c)(3) established to raise funds exclusively for childhood cancer research and increase awareness for these diseases.

Malcolm had led a normal childhood as the youngest of three boys until he began to experience pain in his hip at age ten. Thus began his journey into childhood cancer. Diagnosed in early December 2008 with a pediatric bone cancer called Pelvic Ewing's Sarcoma, he immediately began raising funds for research and speaking out about pediatric cancer. As he got further into his treatments, he learned about the heavy disproportion of research funding that goes towards adult cancer research over childhood cancer research. Eight rounds of chemotherapy into his 14-round treatment protocol, he experienced the loss of a young cancer patient just two doors down from his own hospital room. Malcolm was deeply moved by this child's passing, and ten-year-old Malcolm noted that someone needed to "make some noise" about childhood cancer, and announced that he needed to start a foundation. He spent the remainder of his bone cancer treatments finishing chemotherapy, learning to walk without a hip, and getting the foundation ready to launch.

The month following the end of Malcolm's treatment, Make Some Noise: Cure Kids Cancer was officially incorporated on September 24, 2009, and in just over two years the young entrepreneur has made significant progress. He has released two awareness videos, "1 in 320" and "Pie" both of which can be found on the foundation's YouTube Channel. His foundation was selected as a Top 3 finalist for "Best New Charity" in the 2011 Classy Awards] he was honored by NJ's First Lady, Mary Pat Christie, as a "NJ Hero" in January 2012. Malcolm has toured the country meeting with researchers and learning about the issues they face in securing funding. He has established corporate headquarters in Parsippany NJ, and has chapters forming around the country, with Denver, CO being the first to incorporate in December 2011.

He graduated from the University of Rochester as a member of the class of 2021.
