= Liverpool Boys High School =

Location
- Liverpool, South Western Sydney, New South Wales; Australia; 33°55′01″S 150°55′53″E

Information
- Type: Government-funded single-sex comprehensive secondary day school
- Motto: Latin: Labor Omnia Vincit (Work conquers all)
- Established: 1955; 71 years ago
- Sister school: Liverpool Girls High School
- School district: Liverpool
- Educational authority: New South Wales Department of Education
- Principal: Mike Saxon
- Years: 7–12
- Gender: Boys
- Enrolment: 548 (2018)
- Campus type: Suburban
- Colours: Blue and red
- Mascot: Western Lowland Gorilla
- Website: liverpoolb-h.schools.nsw.gov.au

Liverpool Boys High School is a government-funded single-sex comprehensive secondary day school for boys, located in Liverpool, a south-western suburb of Sydney, New South Wales, Australia.

On 5 March 2024, the NSW Government announced the transition to a future co-educational model by merging with Liverpool Girls High School to form a new combined co-educational campus (provisionally named Liverpool High School).

The plan was announced with official construction and sod-turning ceremonies held in mid-2026 (June/July 2026). Until the new facility opens, the individual schools continue their current operations while the integrated campus is built as part of the Liverpool Health and Education Sub-Precinct.

Established in 1955 as the suburb's first high school, the school caters for approximately 550 students from Year 7 to Year 12; many of whom come from a background of socio-economic disadvantage. The school is operated by the New South Wales Department of Education; the principal is Mike Saxon.

== Notable alumni ==
- Mark Bosnich – Australian and international soccer player
- Michael Clarke – cricketer
- Geoff Gerard – rugby league player
- Eric Grothe Sr. – rugby league player
- Tony Williams – rugby league football player
- Martin Nguyen – mixed martial artist
- John Paul Young – Australian singer
- Steve Smith – cricketer
- Jamie Ainscough – rugby league player
- Colin Curran – Australian and international soccer player
- Graham Murray – rugby league player and coach

== See also ==
- List of government schools in New South Wales
- Education in Australia
