= Abdullah Mohd Salleh =

Malaysian politician

Yang Amat Berbahagia Tun Datuk Abdullah Mohd Salleh SSM PMN DMSM DPMT

5th Chief Secretary to the Government of Malaysia
- In office 1 October 1976 – 31 December 1978
- Preceded by: Abdul Kadir Shamsuddin
- Succeeded by: Abdullah Ayub

Personal details
- Born: 24 June 1926 Kampong Batu, Padang Sebang, Malacca, Straits Settlements (now Malaysia)
- Died: 22 June 2006 (aged 79) Kuala Lumpur, Malaysia
- Resting place: Bukit Kiara Muslim Cemetery, Kuala Lumpur
- Education: University of Malaya

Abdullah bin Mohd Salleh (24 June 1926 – 22 June 2006) was the 5th Chief Secretary to the Government of Malaysia, serving as Chief Secretary from 1 October 1976 to 31 December 1978. He was appointed chairman and chief executive of Petronas from 1 January 1979 and retired as the president and chief executive in early 1988.

== Biography ==
Tun Abdullah was born in Kampong Batu, Padang Sebang, Malacca on 24 June 1926. The son of a Malay school headmaster, though his education had been disrupted by World War II, after the war he entered Malacca High School. He did his sixth form in Malay College Kuala Kangsar (MCKK). He went on to graduate with a Bachelor of Arts with Honours in Geography from the University of Malaya, Singapore.

While in university, he was one of the only non-Johorian to have received a scholarship from the state of Johore. Following graduation, serving the requirements of the Johor scholarship, he went on to become an Assistant District Officer in Muar in the 1955. He was later given release by the Johore State government and later went on to serve as Assistant State Secretary in ipoh Perak.

== Political career ==
It was in Perak where he was spotted by the first Prime Minister of Malaya, Tunku Abdul Rahman. Tunku brought him back to Kuala Lumpur and appointed him as his private secretary from 1959 to 1962. He was appointed Deputy Secretary for the Public Services Commission from 1962 to 1966, and was the Cabinet Under Secretary at the Prime Minister's Department from 1967 to 1968. He was then sent by the prime minister to set up Universiti Kebangsaan Malaysia in 1969, a university set up with the intent of upholding the Malay language, with Malay being its main language of instruction. By May 1970, the University opened its doors and had 192 students. As the first Registrar of the University and subsequently a member of the University Council, he did not forget his ambitions to become a doctor. Instead of becoming one, to relive his dream, he went on to recruit Professors and Lecturers in the field of medicine, many from Indonesia and Myanmar. The success of setting up a university in such short a time elevated him to higher places. His next posting was the Secretary General of the Ministry of Agriculture from 1972 to 1974 and next was the Director General of Public Services Department in 1975. By 1976 he was appointed the Chief Secretary to the Government of Malaysia. Following the death of Tan Sri Abdul Kadir Shamsuddin, the chairman and chief executive of Petronas in 1978, he retired early to become the chairman and chief executive of Petronas on 1 January 1979.

He died on 22 June 2006 just two days short of his 80th birthday.

== Honours ==
- Malaysia
  - Member of the Order of the Defender of the Realm (AMN) (1969)
  - Commander of the Order of the Defender of the Realm (PMN) – Tan Sri (1977)
  - Grand Commander of the Order of Loyalty to the Crown of Malaysia (SSM) – Tun (2003)
- Malacca
  - Companion Class I of the Exalted Order of Malacca (DMSM) – Datuk (1974)
- Terengganu
  - Knight Commander of the Order of the Crown of Terengganu (DPMT) – Dato' (1981)

Preceded by Abdul Kadir Shamsuddin	Chief Secretary to the Government; 1976–1978	Succeeded by Abdullah Ayub
