= Abdul Kadir Shamsuddin =

Chief Secretary to the Government of Malaysia (1920–1978)

Yang Berbahagia Tan Sri Datuk Seri Panglima Abdul Kadir Shamsuddin PMN SPDK PNBS PSM JMN PPM
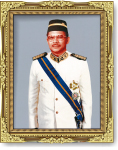

4th Chief Secretary to the Government of Malaysia
- In office 1 January 1970 – 30 September 1976
- Preceded by: Tunku Mohamad Tunku Besar Burhanuddin
- Succeeded by: Abdullah Mohd Salleh

Personal details
- Born: 3 November 1920 Kajang, Selangor, Federated Malay States, British Malaya (now Malaysia)
- Died: 8 November 1978 (aged 58) Kuala Lumpur, Malaysia
- Resting place: Jalan Ampang Muslim Cemetery, Kuala Lumpur
- Education: University of Bristol

Abdul Kadir bin Shamsuddin (3 November 1920 – 8 November 1978) was a Malaysian civil servant who served as the 4th Chief Secretary to the Government from 1970 to 1978.

== Early life ==
Abdul Kadir Shamsuddin was born in Kajang, Selangor Darul Ehsan, Federated Malay States.

After graduating from Kajang High School in 1939 he was appointed Assistant Post Controller before receiving a scholarship to study economics at Raffles College, Singapore. His intelligence was evident while still demanding. This can be seen when he was awarded the "Queen's Scholarship" to further his studies in law at Bristol University, England in 1947.

== Career ==
He entered the Malay Administrative Service (MAS) in 1948 and subsequently to the MCS Service (Malayan Civil Service) in 1952 and served as Assistant State Secretary of Pahang. In 1955 he was appointed Assistant Secretary in the Ministry of Defense (now the Ministry of Defense Malaysia) and in 1956 as the Acting Chief Assistant Secretary in the Ministry of Home Affairs (now the Ministry of Home Affairs Malaysia). In 1957 he was appointed Chief Assistant Secretary in the Ministry of Defense.

As a nationalist, he also worked hard to pour his energy and mind to liberate the country from the colonialists. In the negotiations towards independence, he participated in discussions on key matters such as control over the country's finances, the appointment of Malayan citizens to head Government Departments, internal security and constitutional restoration, and he was even given belief to join the "Independence" entourage. Tan Sri Abdul Kadir has been the Joint Secretary (along with Tan Sri T.H. Tan). With the slogan "Fight or Die" Tan Sri Abdul Kadir worked day and night with other members of the delegation. His diligence and perseverance was personally acknowledged by the late Y.T.M. Tunku Abdul Rahman where he said "both of our Secretaries, Encik Abdul Kadir and T.H. Tan worked beyond their usual duties."

In 1961 he was promoted to Permanent Secretary of the Ministry of Defense. Prior to that he had attended courses at the British Imperial Defense College (now the Royal College of Defense Studies) for a year. He continued to be entrusted with national affairs where he was involved in matters of the formation of Malaysia as well as peace talks with Sukarno in Manila, Tokyo and Bangkok. After 13 May 1969 he was appointed Chief Administrator, Secretariat of Public Affairs Malaysia in the National Movement Council (MAGERAN).

In carrying out his duties, Tan Sri Abdul Kadir was known for his firmness, wisdom and vision. He was the person responsible for transforming the "Federal Establishment Office" into a Public Service Department. The purpose of the change is to reorganize the Federal Establishment Office. During his tenure as Chief Secretary to the Government, Tan Sri has also made many changes. He has tried to avoid bureaucratic-smelling regulations, set up a system of "feedback" and "monitoring", conducted studies on pay scales and other changes in the administrative system. As a political nationalist, he paid special attention to the rural population who were always squeezed by poverty. He took action to prepare rural development plans. Tan Sri Abdul Kadir became the Chairman of the National Development Division which set the new economic policies.

== Retirement and death ==
After six years as Chief Secretary to the Government he retired in 1976. Upon retirement he was appointed chairman and chief executive officer of Petronas. While at Petronas faced various tensions with other oil companies. Among his biggest successes was the signing of the Partnership and Production Agreement and the Formation of Malaysia LNG Sdn Bhd. In addition, he was the chairman of the administrative council of University Pertanian Malaysia (now University Putra Malaysia), chairman of MASPA (Management Association for Administrators), member of the National Committee On Development Administration and chairman of the National Electricity Board (now Tenaga Nasional Berhad/TNB).

Tan Sri Abdul Kadir Shamsuddin was also volunteer chairman of the Malaysian Red Crescent Society and Chairman of the National Library Advisory Board.

He died on 8 November 1978 and was buried at Jalan Ampang Muslim Cemetery in Kuala Lumpur.

== Honours ==
- Malaysia :
  - Companion of the Order of the Defender of the Realm (JMN) (1963)
  - Recipient of the Malaysian Commemorative Medal (Silver) (PPM) (1965)
  - Commander of the Order of Loyalty to the Crown of Malaysia (PSM) – Tan Sri (1966)
  - Commander of the Order of the Defender of the Realm (PMN) – Tan Sri (1972)
- Sabah :
  - Grand Commander of the Order of Kinabalu (SPDK) – Datuk Seri Panglima
- Sarawak :
  - Knight Commander of the Most Exalted Order of the Star of Sarawak (PNBS) – Dato Sri
