= Kajang High School =

Kajang High School SMK Tinggi Kajang
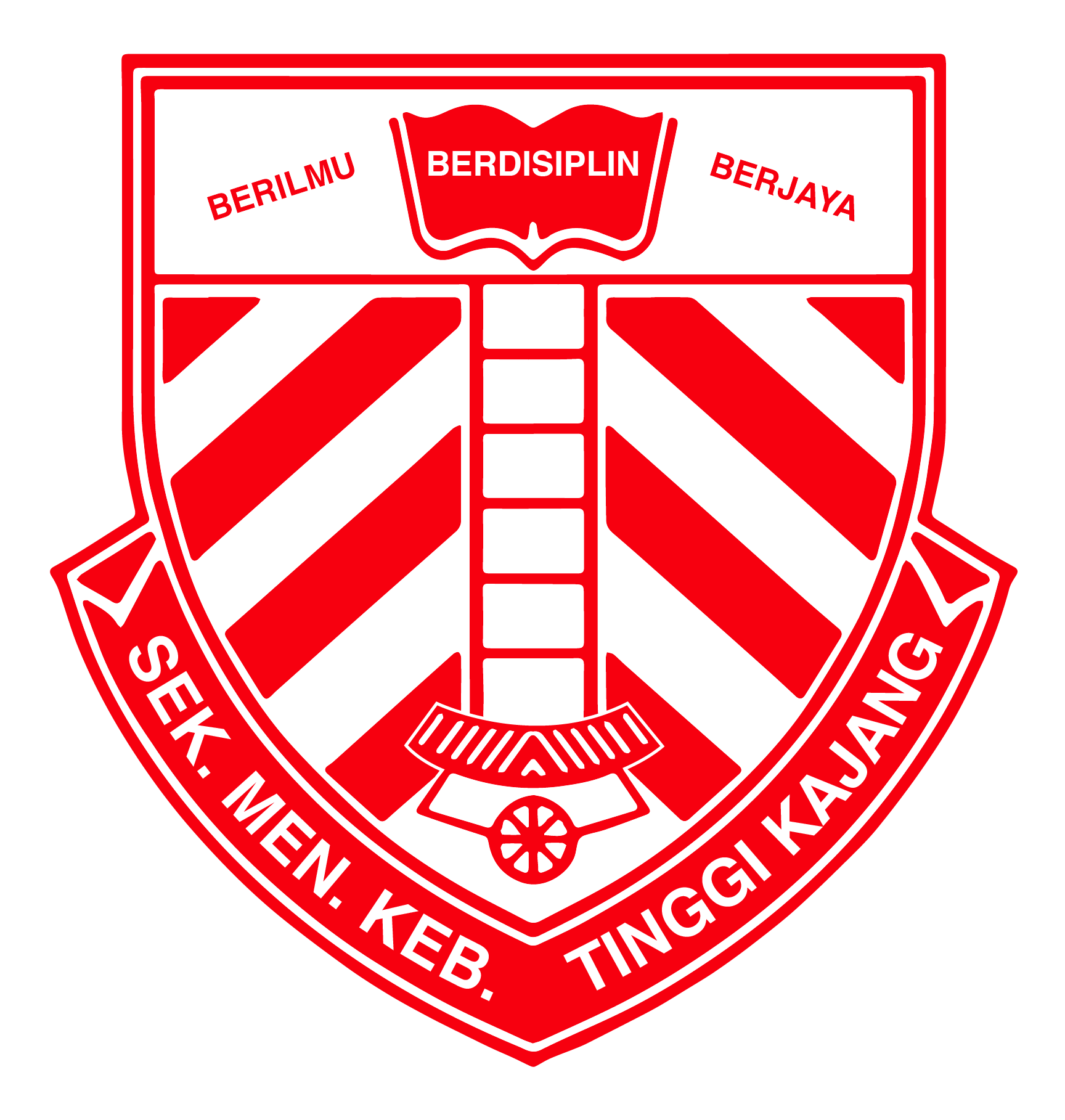

Location
- Kajang, Selangor; Malaysia
- Coordinates: 2°59′37.49″N 101°47′45.65″E

Information
- Type: National secondary school
- Motto: Labor Omnia Vincit; Berilmu, Berdisiplin, Berjaya
- Established: 17 March 1919
- Grades: Form 1 - Form 6
- Enrollment: Around 1300
- Website: mykajanghighschool.blogspot.com

The Kajang High School (Malay: Sekolah Menengah Kebangsaan Tinggi Kajang), better known by its initials KHS in English and SMKTK in Bahasa Malaysia, is a national secondary school (Sekolah Menengah Kebangsaan) in Kajang, Hulu Langat District, Selangor, Malaysia. It is the oldest school in Kajang and the district of Hulu Langat when the first block was erected at Mile 14 Cheras Road (Jalan Cheras), (located at latitude 2°59'37.49"N and longitude 101°47'45.65"E) opposite Jamek Mosque of Kajang.

The former site was a vacant lot that held satay stalls in 1903 CE and later shifted to its permanent site beside Semenyih Road, a hilly area where the first block (Blok Utama) was constructed. The word high in Kajang High School gets its meaning, from the namesake of being located on top of a hill.

== History ==
Kajang High School was founded on 17 March 1919 as the Government English School Kajang. The original number of students was 70 men and women.

Eleven years later the school moved and changed its name to Kajang High School. The main building was inaugurated on 1 April 1930. At the time it had a total of 402 students.

After the Japanese invasion of Malaya in World War II the school building was taken over by the Australian army. Operations of the school were moved to Sekolah Convent Kajang.

From 6 December 1941 to 12 September 1945 school building became the headquarters of the Japanese army and the name of the school was changed to "Toa Seinen Gakko". The school was moved again, this time to the National Cinema (now the center of Karaoke). It also became a first Teacher Training College.

On 7 April 1955, a primary school (Schools 1 and 2 as school supplies) was opened.

In 1958, the High SMK Kajang was divided into two separate parts, the Primary and Secondary Schools. In the same year a workshop for vocational subjects (carpentry, metalwork, study and analyse the electrical power) was completed. Additional rooms were built in the early months of next December 1964 for teaching Industrial Arts. On 30 July 1960, the school library was created.

A science block was officially opened on 23 July 1970. To accommodate students who live far away, a small dormitory was built out of wood which houses about 90 students. Construction of the new hostel building began in 1972 and was completed in 1973 and was officially opened on 1 July 1975. It caught fire in April 1998 and has since undergone renovation.

By 1982, the school consisted of 11 blocks of 31 classrooms, four science laboratories, 4 rooms carpentry, 1 library room, 1 hall, 2 canteens, and hostels.

On 2 June 1988, a new building block containing eight classrooms was used to accommodate a floating classroom that has been around since 1982. A mosque named "Al - Rahman" was inaugurated on 13 February 1993.

== Notable alumni ==
- Abdul Aziz Abdul Majid, the third Yang di-Pertua Negeri of Malacca, the 5th Menteri Besar of Selangor & the first Chief Secretary to the Government
- Abdul Kadir Shamsuddin, the 4th Chief Secretary to the Government
- Tan Chee Khoon, medical doctor, the second Leader of the Opposition
- Nidzam Jamil, national footballer, coach
- K. Sanbagamaran, national footballer
- Christie Jayaseelan, national footballer
