= NIPSNAP2 =

Protein-coding gene in the species Homo sapiens

Identifiers
- Aliases: NIPSNAP2, GBAS, glioblastoma amplified sequence, nipsnap homolog 2
- External IDs: OMIM: 603004; MGI: 1278343; GeneCards: NIPSNAP2

Gene location (Human)
Chr.	Chromosome 7 (human)
Band	7p11.2	Start	55,951,793 bp
Band	7p11.2	End	56,000,181 bp

Gene location (Mouse)
Chr.	Chromosome 5 (mouse)
Band	5|5 G1.3	Start	129,802,127 bp
Band	5|5 G1.3	End	129,835,391 bp
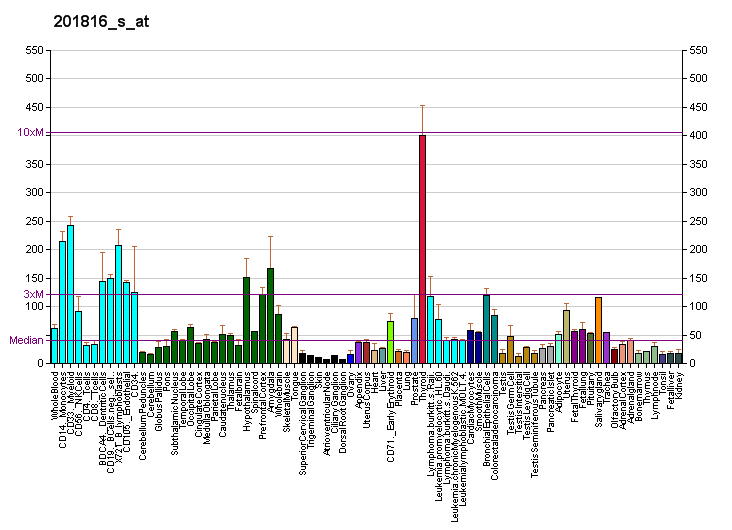
RNA expression pattern
Bgee	Human / Mouse (ortholog); Top expressed in: biceps brachii; Skeletal muscle tissue of biceps brachii; vastus lateralis muscle; right ventricle; Skeletal muscle tissue of rectus abdominis; thoracic diaphragm; gastrocnemius muscle; deltoid muscle; muscle of thigh; triceps brachii muscle / Top expressed in: cardiac muscle tissue of left ventricle; muscle of thigh; choroid plexus of fourth ventricle; aortic valve; atrioventricular valve; skeletal muscle tissue; plantaris muscle; lip; superior surface of tongue; interventricular septum; More reference expression data
BioGPS	More reference expression data
Gene ontology
Molecular function	protein binding
Cellular component	integral component of plasma membrane; membrane; mitochondrion; cytoplasm; mitochondrial outer membrane
Biological process	oxidative phosphorylation; negative regulation of ATP citrate synthase activity; ATP biosynthetic process; positive regulation of high voltage-gated calcium channel activity; mitochondrion organization
Sources:Amigo / QuickGO
Orthologs
Databases	NCBI: entry; OMA: entry
Species	Human	Mouse
Entrez	2631	14467
Ensembl	ENSG00000146729	ENSMUSG00000029432
UniProt	O75323	O55126
RefSeq (mRNA)	NM_001483; NM_001202469	NM_008095
RefSeq (protein)	NP_001189398; NP_001474	n/a
Location (UCSC)	Chr 7: 55.95 – 56 Mb	Chr 5: 129.8 – 129.84 Mb
PubMed search
- Wikidata
View/Edit Human	View/Edit Mouse

Protein NipSnap homolog 2 is a protein that in humans is encoded by the NIPSNAP2 gene (previously GBAS).

Chromosomal region 7p12, which contains NIPSNAP2, is amplified in approximately 40% of glioblastomas, the most common and malignant form of central nervous system tumor. The predicted 286-amino acid protein contains a signal peptide, a transmembrane domain, and 2 tyrosine phosphorylation sites. The NIPSNAP2 transcript is expressed most abundantly in heart and skeletal muscle. The NIPSNAP2 protein might be involved in vesicular transport.
