= Liverpool Girls High School =

Location
- Forbes Street, Liverpool; Sydney, New South Wales, 2170; Australia; 33°55′06″S 150°55′53″E

Information
- Other name: LGHS
- Type: Public high school
- Motto: Latin: Labor Omnia Vincit (Work Conquers All)
- Established: 1954
- Sister school: Liverpool Boys High School
- Educational authority: New South Wales Department of Education
- Principal: Kirstine Gonano
- Teaching staff: 66
- Years offered: 7–12
- Gender: Girls
- Enrolment: 876 (2018)
- Colours: Navy blue, red, white (since 1993); Blue and white (from 1954 to 1993)
- Website: liverpool-h.schools.nsw.gov.au

Liverpool Girls High School (LGHS) is a public high school for girls in Liverpool, Sydney, New South Wales, Australia. It was established in 1954.

Many of its students come from a background of socio-economic disadvantage, with over 89 percent from a language background other than English.
