= Argyle House School =

Location
- Thornhill Park; Sunderland, Tyne and Wear, SR2 7LA; England
- 54.906°N 1.382°W

Information
- Type: Independent school
- Motto: Labor Omnia Vincit (Work Conquers All)
- Established: 1884
- Founder: G.L Hanna
- Department for Education URN: 108873 Tables
- Headmaster: John Sample
- Gender: Coeducational
- Age: 2 to 16
- Enrolment: 240 (as of 2018)
- Houses: Gold, Red & Green
- Website: www.argylehouseschool.co.uk

Argyle House School is an independent school in North East England. It was founded in 1884. Though not in the original location, it is still in the same area, Thornhill, and borders Ashbrooke, about five minutes' walk away from Sunderland city centre. It caters for pupils from age 2 to 16, and at the time of the last inspection in 2018, had 122 boys and 118 girls in attendance.

The headteacher is John Sample.

== History ==
Founded by G.L. Hanna in 1884 in nearby Argyle Square, from which it got its name, it remained in the Hanna family until 1969 until it was sold to the Mr Jeffrey Johnson. His son, Christopher Johnson purchased the school from his father on the latter's retirement in 2003. He retired in 2025. The school is owned by Forfar Education, a growing family of UK & International Schools and Mr John Sample is Headmaster. The school, founded as a boys' school, has been non-selective and co-educational since 1997.
