= Labor omnia vincit =

Latin phrase

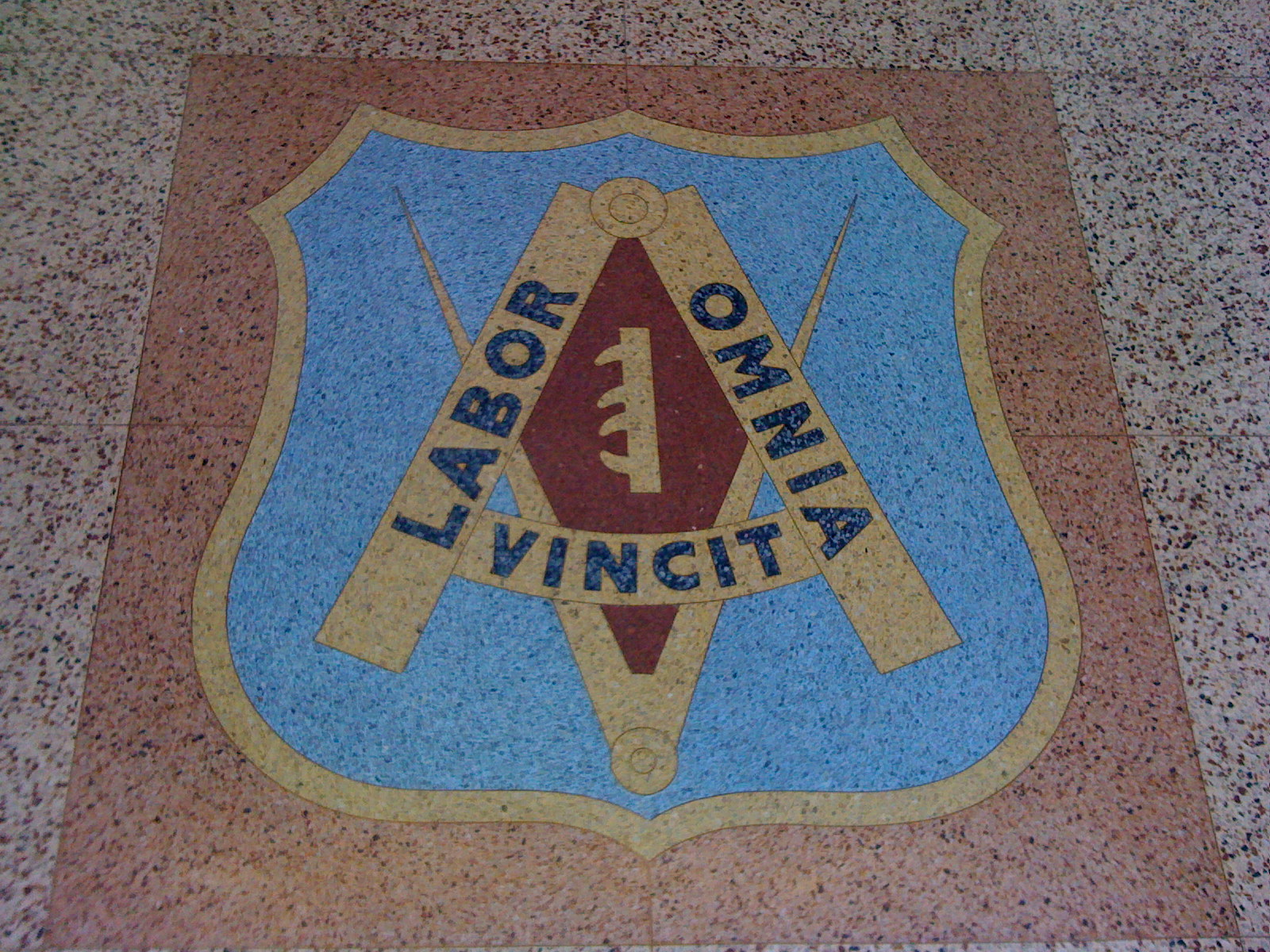
Labor omnia vincit inscribed on a floor tile showing the UBC Emblem.

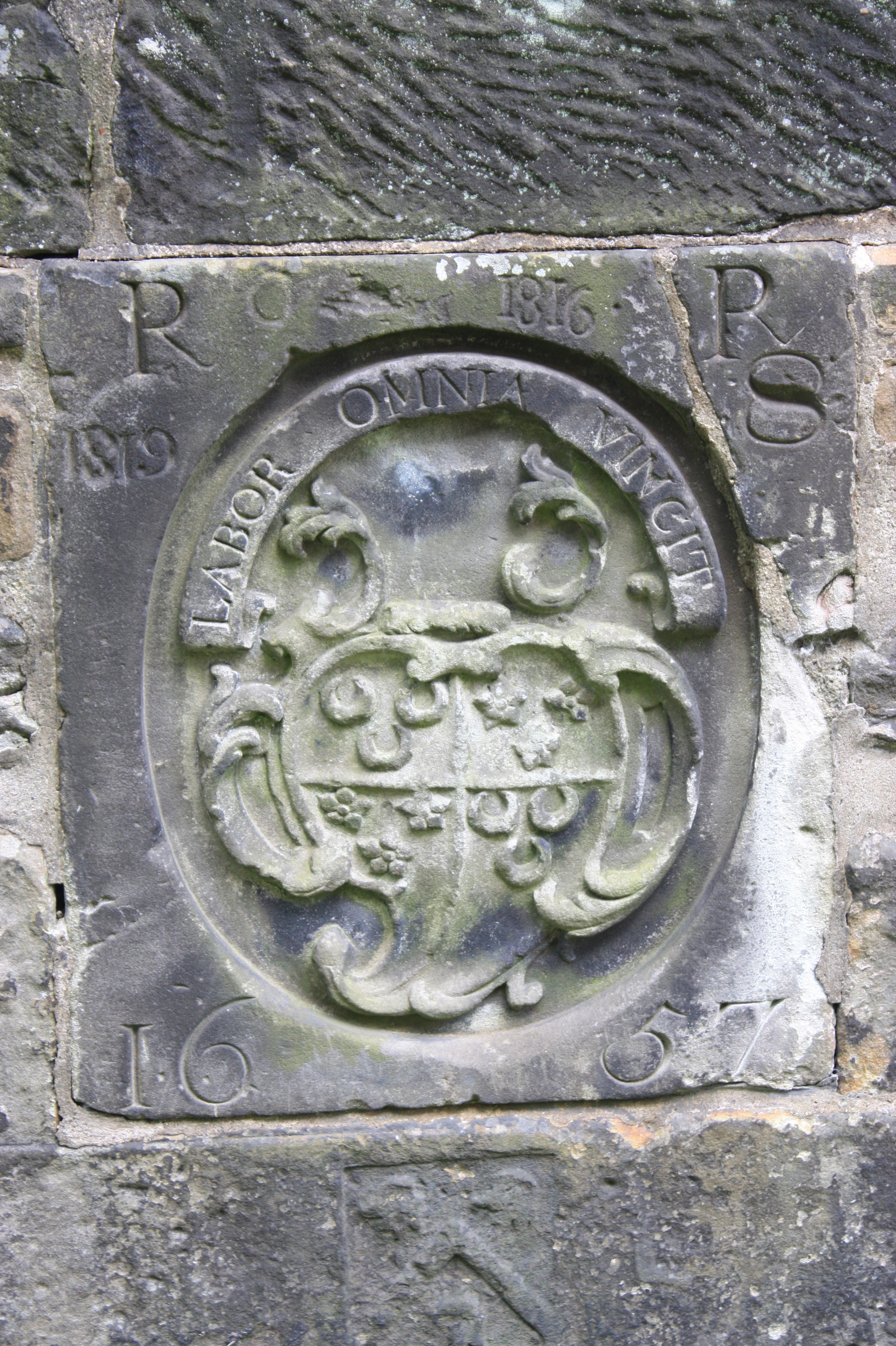
Labor Omnia Vincit 1657, Glasgow Cathedral

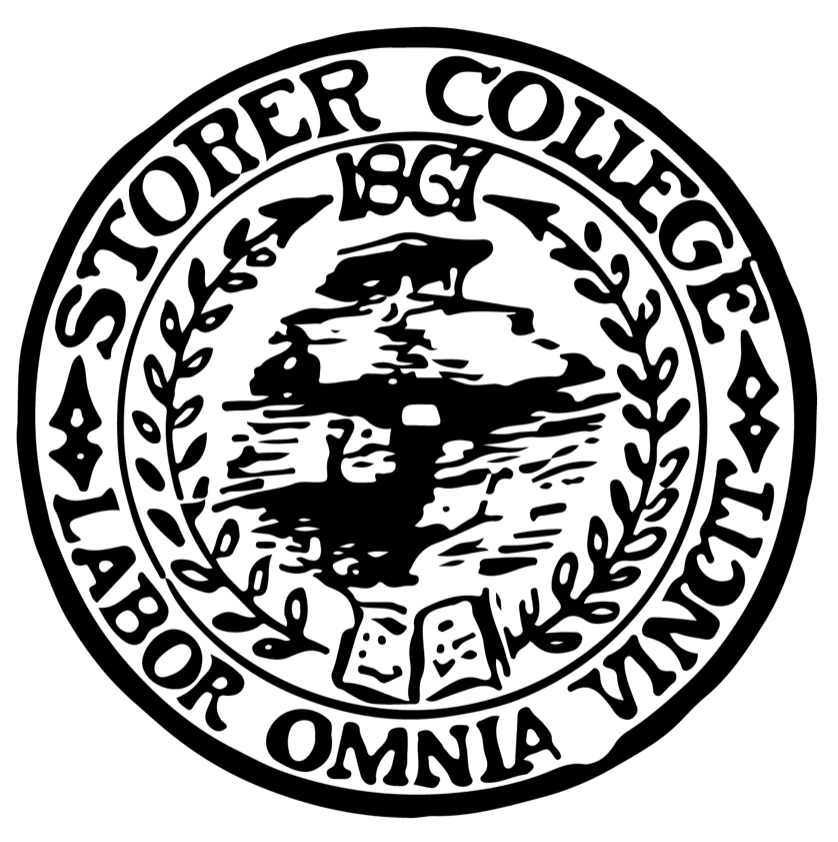
Seal of Storer College, Harpers Ferry, West Virginia, United States

Labor omnia vincit or Labor omnia vincit improbus is a Latin phrase meaning "Work conquers all". The phrase is adapted from Virgil's Georgics, Book I, lines 145–6: ...Labor omnia vicit / improbus ("Steady work overcame all things"). The poem was written in support of Augustus Caesar's "Back to the land" policy, aimed at encouraging more Romans to become farmers.

== Labor movement ==
A frequent motto within the U.S labor movement, the phrase is a historically significant slogan. Used by the earliest U.S labor unions such as the American Federation of Labor and other precursors to the modern AFL-CIO, the motto continues to be a traditional and defining statement of purpose on contemporary labor union emblems including the International Union of Operating Engineers and the United Brotherhood of Carpenters and Joiners of America. The motto also appears on the original 1925 flag of the Brotherhood of Sleeping Car Porters, the labor union of African-American Pullman Company porters founded by civil rights leader A. Philip Randolph. The College of Engineering, Guindy in Chennai, India and founded in the year 1794 has the phrase "Labor Omnia Vincit" in its logo. This may be the earliest adoption of the phrase by any organization.

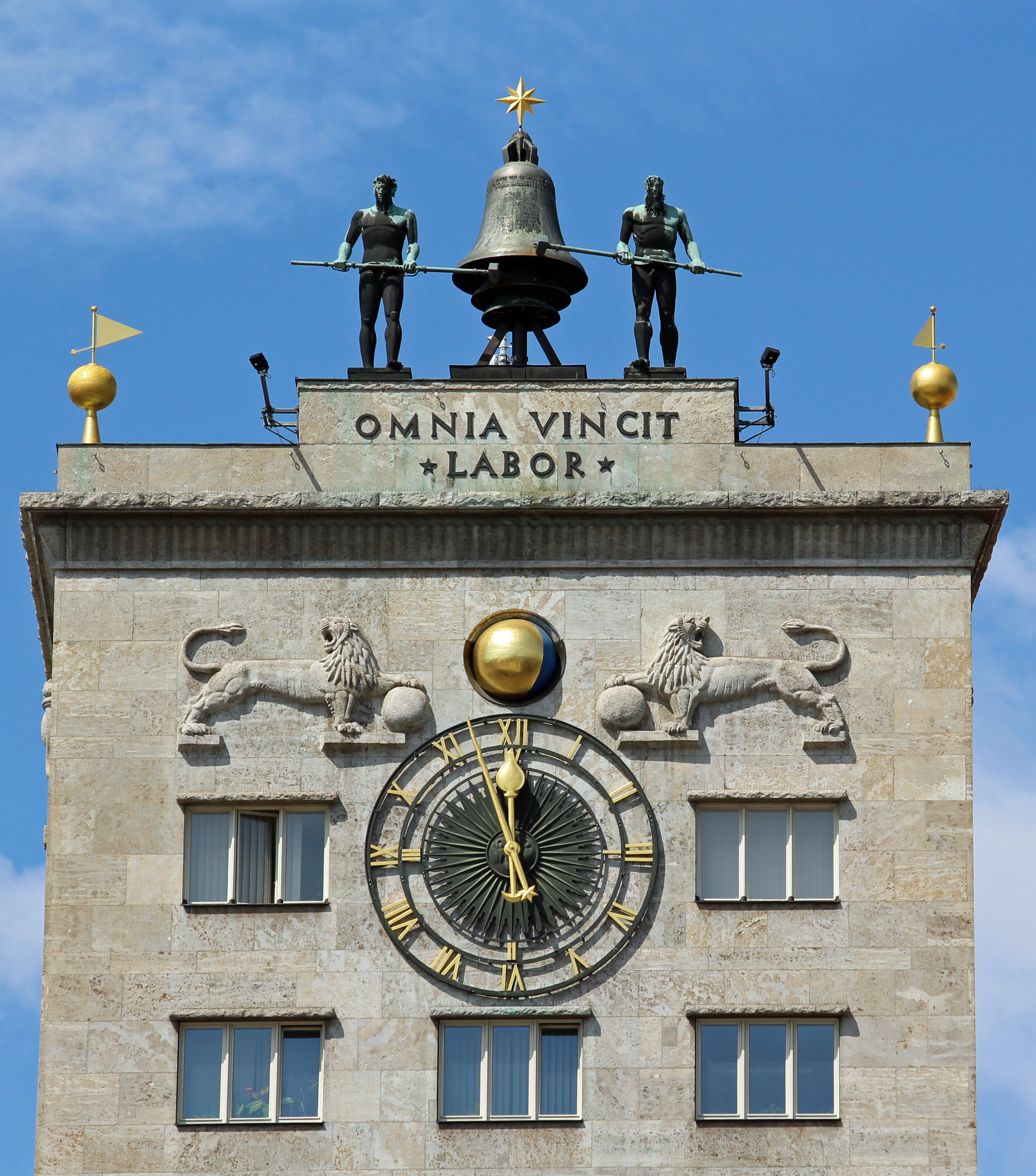
Inscription on the Kroch High-rise, Leipzig, Germany

The motto is used by the Geelong Trades Hall Council in Australia. It is also put up on the facade of the Kroch High-rise in Leipzig, Germany.

== Cities, states, and recreation ==
The phrase is also a frequent motto across many townships, cities, and states. Currently the state motto of the State of Oklahoma and incorporated into its state seal in 1907, the slogan originally appeared on the territorial seal of Oklahoma Territory. In addition, it has been known to be the motto of the city of El Eulma, Algeria as shown on its coat of arms, of the towns and cities of Bradford, West Yorkshire, West Bromwich, and Ilkeston in England, the motto of Wrexham County Borough Council in Wales and the state motto of Zacatecas granted by King Phillip II in 1588 and the city of León, State of Guanajuato, Mexico, and in the city of Presidente Prudente, Brazil. It is also the motto of Ferraz de Vasconcelos, a municipality in the state of São Paulo in Brazil, as well as the city of Polokwane, formerly known as Pietersburg in South Africa. It is the motto of Carlton Cricket Club in Barbados. It is also the motto of Kajang High School and St Jago High School (Jamaica), St Paul's Secondary School, Kabwe Zambia, as well as Mitchell High School in Durban, South Africa. It is a slogan of the football clubs Rasta IL in Norway and Luton Borough Youth in England. The phrase can be seen written in the golden letters on the so-called Kroch-Hochhaus in the center of German city Leipzig. It is also the motto of West Bromwich Albion FC and The Royal Marsden Hospital.

• In cinema this slogan was used in a landmark French picture "Le Voyage dans la lune" or "A Trip To The Moon" a silent film brought to life in 1902 by director Georges Méliès. This is a classic vision about a group of men venturing to the moon and back. The scene in which the slogan is depicted comes at the end when they return to earth. Celebrating the triumph, a statue is brought forth with a scholar pointing to the heavens with the word SCIENCE surrounded by olive branches on the base, above this states the term LABOR • OMNIA • VINCIT

== Educational institutions ==
Many educational institutions have adopted the phrase as a motto, including:

=== Africa ===
- Bhujoharry College (Boys), Port Louis, Mauritius
- Flintstone Engineering, Addis Ababa, Ethiopia
- Universidade A Politecnica, Maputo, Mozambique

==== Angola ====
- Moçâmedes, est. 1840

==== South Africa ====
- H. T. S. Louis Botha, Bloemfontein, South Africa
- High School Westonaria, Westonaria, Gauteng

Mitchell High School, Durban

==== Ghana (West Africa) ====
- St. Augustine's College (Cape Coast)

==== Kenya ( Eastern Africa) ====
- Menengai High School, Nakuru
- Mombasa Technical Training Institute, Mombasa
- Olkejuado High School, Kajiado

==== Lesotho (Southern Africa) ====
- Mamathe High School, Teya-teyaneng, Berea

==== Nigeria (West Africa) ====
- Offa Grammar School, Offa, Kwara State

==== South Africa ====
- Robert Carruthers Primary School, Witbank, Mpumalanga
- Tshepagalang High School Northwest [Brit]

==== Zambia (Southern Africa) ====
- St Paul's Mulungushi Secondary School, Kabwe, founded in 1960 by Marist Brothers.

==== Sierra Leone (West Africa) ====
- St Helena A.M.E. Secondary school

=== Asia ===
- The Elite's Co-Ed School, Kathmandu, Nepal
- Greenwich University, Karachi, Pakistan

==== Hong Kong ====
- Queen's College, Hong Kong
- St. Simon's Lui Ming Choi Secondary Technical School

==== India ====
- Albany Hall Public School, Kolkata
- College of Engineering, Guindy, Chenna
- Government Aizawl College, Aizawl
- Grant Medical College, Mumbai
- Indus Academy, Hyderabad
- Kohima Science College, Jotsoma
- St. John's Senior Secondary School, Meerut
- St. Joseph's Higher Secondary School, Cuddalore
- St. Jude's School, Amritsar
- St. Kabir Public School, Chandigarh
- St. Mary's Convent High School, Nainital
- St. Sebastian Goan High School, Mumbai
- Sydenham College, Mumbai

==== Malaysia ====
- Gajah Berang Secondary English School, Malacca
- Kajang High School, Kajang, Selangor
- Sekolah Menengah Gajah Berang, Melaka
- St. Xavier's Institution, Penang

==== Singapore ====
- Montfort Secondary School
- Outram Secondary School
- St. Gabriel's Secondary School
- Assumption English School

==== Sri Lanka ====
- Rayal College, Wayamba

==== Thailand ====
- Assumption College Lampang
- Assumption College Nakhon Ratchasima
- Assumption College Rayong
- Assumption College Samutprakarn
- Assumption College Sriracha
- Assumption College
- Assumption College Thonburi
- Assumption College Ubon Ratchathani
- Assumption Commercial College
- Assumption Technical School Nakhon Phanom
- Assumption University of Thailand
- Montfort College, Chiang Mai
- Saint Gabriel's College
- St. Louis College Chachoengsao

=== Europe ===
==== Finland ====
- Hämeenlinnan Lyseo, Hämeenlinna
- Iisalmen Lyseo, Iisalmi

==== Romania ====
- Carol Davila University of Medicine and Pharmacy, Bucharest
- Nicolae Kretzulescu Superior Economic School (College), Bucharest
- Mihai Eminescu National College, Constanța

==== Spain ====
- Academia Cots, Alicante
- Academia Cots, Barcelona
- Academia Cots, Lleida
- Academia Cots, Valencia
- Universidad a distancia de Madrid, (UDIMA), Madrid

==== United Kingdom ====
- Altrincham Grammar School for Boys, Altrincham, Greater Manchester
- Argyle House School, Sunderland, Tyne and Wear
- Barnardiston Hall Preparatory School, Nr Haverhill, Suffolk
- Cheltenham College, Cheltenham, Gloucestershire
- Collingwood School, Wallington, London Borough of Sutton, South London
- Elmfield College (1863–1932), Heworth, York
- Hamilton Academy, Hamilton, Lanarkshire
- Ilkeston Grammar School, Ilkeston, Derbyshire
- Kettlethorpe High School, Maths And Computing College, Wakefield, West Yorkshire.
- Midhurst Grammar School, Midhurst, West Sussex
- Northgate Grammar School for Girls, Ipswich 1931–1977
- Strathallan School, Forgandenny, Perthshire
- Strathaven Academy, Strathaven, Lanarkshire
- The Eastwood School, Leigh On sea, Essex
- Tredworth Junior School, Tredworth, Gloucester, Gloucestershire
- Villiers High School, Southall, London Borough of Ealing, West London
- Ysgol Bro Gwaun, Fishguard, Pembrokeshire

Turkey

- American Collegiate Institute Debate Club, Izmir

=== North America ===
==== Canada ====
- Ashton College, Vancouver, BC
- Barrie Central Collegiate Institute, Barrie, Ontario
- Brockville Collegiate Institute, Brockville, Ontario
- Brooks Composite High School, Brooks, AB
- Elliot Lake Secondary School - ELSS, Elliot Lake, Ontario
- Gloucester High School, Ottawa, Ontario
- Hamiota Collegiate Institute, Hamiota, MB
- Hants East Rural High School, Milford, NS
- Hartland High School, Hartland, New Brunswick
- Huntsville High School, Huntsville, ON
- Liverpool Regional High School, Liverpool, Nova Scotia
- Naicam High School, Naicam, Saskatchewan
- Newmarket High School, Newmarket, Ontario
- North Toronto Collegiate Institute, Toronto, Ontario
- Paris District High School, Paris, Ontario
- Queen Elizabeth Junior and Senior High School (Calgary), Alberta
- Rosemount High School, Montreal, Quebec
- Saugeen District Secondary School, Port Elgin, Ontario
- St. Catharines Collegiate, Ontario
- St. John's School, St. Jean-sur-Richelieu, Quebec
- Whitehorse High School, Whitehorse, Yukon (closed in 1962)
- W.L. Seaton Secondary School, Vernon, BC

==== Caribbean and Central America ====
- Bahamas Baptist Community College, Nassau, Bahamas
- Escuela Agrìcola Panamericana Zamorano, Honduras
- Zamorano Pan-American Agricultural School
- Merl Grove High School Kingston, Jamaica
- Rusea's High School, Lucea, Jamaica
- Saltus Grammar School, Pembroke, Bermuda
- San Juan Senior Comprehensive, Trinidad
- St. Jago High School, Spanish Town, Jamaica
- The Convent High School, Roseau, Commonwealth of Dominica
- Zeta Mu Gamma Fraternity, Mayagüez, Puerto Rico
- Fajardo Academy, Fajardo, Puerto Rico

==== Mexico ====
- Benemérita Escuela Normal Federalizada de Tamaulipas (BENFT), Ciudad Victoria, Tamaulipas
- Instituto Salvatierra, A.C., Mexicali, Baja California

==== United States ====
- Alpha Phi Tau Fraternity, Heidelberg College, Tiffin, Ohio
- Beverly High School Lacrosse Team, Beverly, Massachusetts
- Centenary College of Louisiana, Shreveport, Louisiana
- Columbia City High School, Columbia City, Indiana
- Fessenden School, West Newton, Massachusetts
- Gardner High School, Gardner, Massachusetts
- Loudon High School, Loudon, Tennessee
- Mount Saint Joseph Academy, Brighton, Massachusetts
- Peter Donahue Mechanics Monument, San Francisco, California
- The Potomac School, McLean, Virginia
- Prosser Career Academy, Chicago, Illinois
- Puyallup High School, Puyallup, Washington
- Storer College, Harpers Ferry, West Virginia (closed in 1965)
- Sumter High School, Sumter, South Carolina

=== Oceania ===
- Suva Sangam College, Suva, Fiji Islands

==== Australia ====
- Birdwood High School, SA
- Bourke High School
- Captains Flat Public School, NSW
- Dubbo Public School, NSW
- Glenunga International High School
- Hagley Farm Primary School, Tasmania
- Hampton Senior High School, Morley, Western Australia
- Kapunda High School, Kapunda, SA
- Liverpool Boys High School, NSW
- Liverpool Girls High School, NSW
- Maitland Grossmann High School
- Malanda State High, QLD
- Maleny State School, QLD
- Chinchilla State High, QLD
- Mittagong Public School, NSW
- Muswellbrook High School, New South Wales
- Paddington Public School, Sydney
- Panania Public School, Sydney
- Peterborough High School, Peterborough, SA
- Princes Street Primary School, Hobart, Tasmania
- Roseville College, Sydney
- Shepparton High School, Victoria
- Sydney Girls High School
- Wellington High School, Wellington, NSW
- Windellama Public School, New South Wales

==== New Zealand ====
- Geraldine High School

=== South America ===
- The Bishops' High School, Guyana

==== Argentina ====
- Balmoral College, Buenos Aires
- Escuela Nº 1 Dalmacio Vélez Sarsfield, Concordia
- Instituto San José de Morón, Buenos Aires

==== Brazil ====
- Instituto Mairiporã - Thomaz Cruz, Mairiporã
- Macarani, Brasília

==== Chile ====
- City of Punta Arenas
- Chilean Gendarmerie
- Instituto Nacional General José Miguel Carrera, Santiago
- Liceo de Hombres Manuel Montt, Puerto Montt
- Primera Compañia de Bomberos, Concepción, Chile (A firefighters company)
- Saint Peter's School, Viña del Mar

==== Ecuador ====
- Academia Naval Illingworth, Guayaquil

==== Peru ====
- Peruvian Northamerican Abraham Lincoln School, Lima

== See also ==
- List of Latin phrases
- Alexia: Labor Omnia Vincit
- Amor vincit omnia (Love conquers all)
