= Childhood cancer =

- Other names: Pediatric cancer
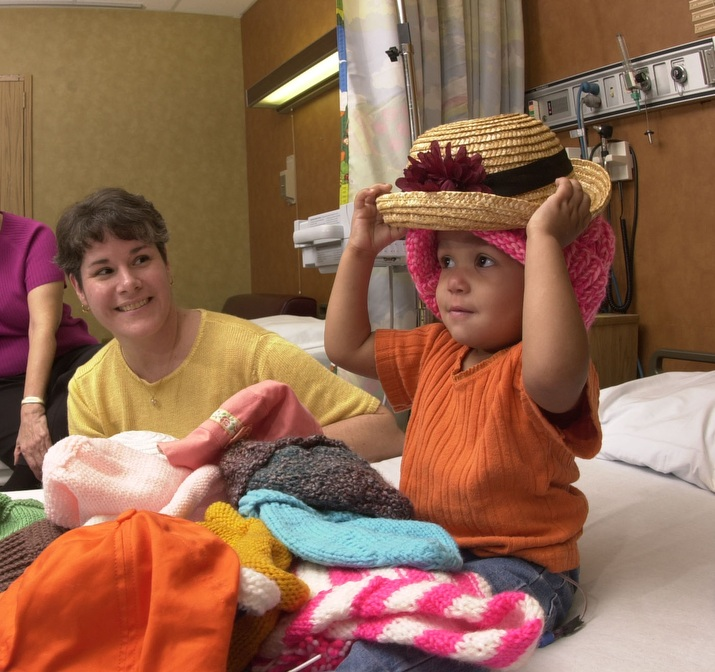
- A girl trying out hats to wear after chemotherapy against a Wilms' tumor
- Specialty: Pediatrics, oncology

About 80% of childhood cancer cases in high-income countries can be treated with modern treatments and good medical care. Although treatment and care are available, only 10% of children with cancer reside in high-income countries. Globally, children with cancer account for approximately 1% of all cancer diagnosis annually. The majority of children with cancer are in low- and middle-income countries, where it is responsible for 94% of deaths among those under 15 years old, because new cancer treatments are not easily available in these countries. For this reason, in low and mid-income countries, childhood cancer is often ignored in control planning, contributing to the burden of missed opportunities for its diagnoses and management.

Even with improved care, childhood cancer survivors face ongoing risks of recurrence and secondary cancers. Rates of childhood cancer deaths have steadily declined since 2003, but rates of pediatric cancer are on the rise. The biggest increase has been seen in thyroid carcinomas, lymphoma, and hepatic tumors. Pediatric cancer patients face additional challenges in education, income, and social support compared to the general population and their siblings.

In the United States, an arbitrarily adopted standard of the ages used is 0–14 years inclusive, up to age 14 years 11.9 months. However, the definition of childhood cancer sometimes includes adolescents between 15 and 19 years old. Pediatric oncology is the branch of medicine concerned with the diagnosis and treatment of cancer in children.

== Signs and symptoms ==
Common childhood malignancies can be categorized by the International Classification of Childhood Cancer (ICCC), which is a standardized method created by the World Health Organization (WHO).

ICCC Classification	Information	Signs and Symptoms
I. Leukemias, Myeloproliferative And Myelodysplastic Diseases
(a) Lymphoid leukemias	This is the most common type of cancer during childhood, and acute lymphoblastic leukemia (ALL) is most common in children. ALL usually develops in children between the ages of 1 and 10 (it could occur at any age). This type of cancer is more prevalent in males and white people. Diagnosis is frequently delayed due to nonspecific early symptoms.	Generalized malaise; Loss of appetite; Low-grade fever; Pallor; Petechiae; Ecchymoses; Bone pain; Significant, unintended, and sudden weight loss; Significant lymphadenopathy; Hepatosplenomegaly
(b) Acute myeloid leukemias	This is the most common type of cancer during childhood, and acute lymphoblastic leukemia (ALL) is most common in children. ALL usually develops in children between the ages of 1 and 10 (it could occur at any age). This type of cancer is more prevalent in males and white people. Diagnosis is frequently delayed due to nonspecific early symptoms.	Generalized malaise; Loss of appetite; Low-grade fever; Pallor; Petechiae; Ecchymoses; Bone pain; Significant, unintended, and sudden weight loss; Significant lymphadenopathy; Hepatosplenomegaly
(c) Chronic myeloproliferative diseases	This is the most common type of cancer during childhood, and acute lymphoblastic leukemia (ALL) is most common in children. ALL usually develops in children between the ages of 1 and 10 (it could occur at any age). This type of cancer is more prevalent in males and white people. Diagnosis is frequently delayed due to nonspecific early symptoms.	Generalized malaise; Loss of appetite; Low-grade fever; Pallor; Petechiae; Ecchymoses; Bone pain; Significant, unintended, and sudden weight loss; Significant lymphadenopathy; Hepatosplenomegaly
(d) Myelodysplastic syndrome and other myeloproliferative diseases	This is the most common type of cancer during childhood, and acute lymphoblastic leukemia (ALL) is most common in children. ALL usually develops in children between the ages of 1 and 10 (it could occur at any age). This type of cancer is more prevalent in males and white people. Diagnosis is frequently delayed due to nonspecific early symptoms.	Generalized malaise; Loss of appetite; Low-grade fever; Pallor; Petechiae; Ecchymoses; Bone pain; Significant, unintended, and sudden weight loss; Significant lymphadenopathy; Hepatosplenomegaly
(e) Unspecified and other specified leukemias	This is the most common type of cancer during childhood, and acute lymphoblastic leukemia (ALL) is most common in children. ALL usually develops in children between the ages of 1 and 10 (it could occur at any age). This type of cancer is more prevalent in males and white people. Diagnosis is frequently delayed due to nonspecific early symptoms.	Generalized malaise; Loss of appetite; Low-grade fever; Pallor; Petechiae; Ecchymoses; Bone pain; Significant, unintended, and sudden weight loss; Significant lymphadenopathy; Hepatosplenomegaly
II. Lymphomas and reticuloendothelial neoplasms
(a) Hodgkin lymphomas	The likelihood of developing Hodgkin Lymphoma increases during childhood and it peaks in adolescence. It is often associated with Epstein-Barr virus infection.	Painless mass in the neck; Persistent cough secondary to a mediastinal mass; Less commonly: splenomegaly or enlarged axillary or inguinal lymph nodes; Intermittent fever; Drenching night sweats; Loss of greater than 10 percent of total body weight; Anorexia; Fatigue; Pruritus; Persistent painless mass
(b) Non-Hodgkin lymphomas (except Burkitt lymphoma)	Non-Hodgkin's lymphoma is more common in older children, and it is less prevalent than Hodgkin's disease.	If the abdomen is affected: Abdominal pain; Vomiting or diarrhea; Palpable mass and intussusception; If mediastinum is affected: Severe dyspnea; Superior vena cava syndrome; If head and neck masses are affected: Palpable mass; Cranial nerve palsies; Nasal obstruction
(c) Burkitt lymphoma	Non-Hodgkin's lymphoma is more common in older children, and it is less prevalent than Hodgkin's disease.	If the abdomen is affected: Abdominal pain; Vomiting or diarrhea; Palpable mass and intussusception; If mediastinum is affected: Severe dyspnea; Superior vena cava syndrome; If head and neck masses are affected: Palpable mass; Cranial nerve palsies; Nasal obstruction
(d) Miscellaneous lymphoreticular neoplasms	Non-Hodgkin's lymphoma is more common in older children, and it is less prevalent than Hodgkin's disease.	If the abdomen is affected: Abdominal pain; Vomiting or diarrhea; Palpable mass and intussusception; If mediastinum is affected: Severe dyspnea; Superior vena cava syndrome; If head and neck masses are affected: Palpable mass; Cranial nerve palsies; Nasal obstruction
(e) Unspecified lymphomas	Non-Hodgkin's lymphoma is more common in older children, and it is less prevalent than Hodgkin's disease.	If the abdomen is affected: Abdominal pain; Vomiting or diarrhea; Palpable mass and intussusception; If mediastinum is affected: Severe dyspnea; Superior vena cava syndrome; If head and neck masses are affected: Palpable mass; Cranial nerve palsies; Nasal obstruction
III. CNS and Miscellaneous Intracranial and Intraspinal Neoplasms
(a) Ependymomas and choroid plexus tumor	CNS tumors are the second most common malignancy diagnosed during childhood, and they are the leading cause of death from cancer in children.	Headache; Nausea and vomiting; Papilledema; Bulging fontanelle; Behavioral changes (lethargy, irritability, etc); Failure to thrive; Ataxia; Other gait disturbances (hydrocephalus due to aqueduct compression); Cranial nerve abnormalities as a result of brainstem compression
(b) Astrocytomas	CNS tumors are the second most common malignancy diagnosed during childhood, and they are the leading cause of death from cancer in children.	Headache; Nausea and vomiting; Papilledema; Bulging fontanelle; Behavioral changes (lethargy, irritability, etc); Failure to thrive; Ataxia; Other gait disturbances (hydrocephalus due to aqueduct compression); Cranial nerve abnormalities as a result of brainstem compression
(c) Intracranial and intraspinal embryonal tumors	CNS tumors are the second most common malignancy diagnosed during childhood, and they are the leading cause of death from cancer in children.	Headache; Nausea and vomiting; Papilledema; Bulging fontanelle; Behavioral changes (lethargy, irritability, etc); Failure to thrive; Ataxia; Other gait disturbances (hydrocephalus due to aqueduct compression); Cranial nerve abnormalities as a result of brainstem compression
(d) Other gliomas	CNS tumors are the second most common malignancy diagnosed during childhood, and they are the leading cause of death from cancer in children.	Headache; Nausea and vomiting; Papilledema; Bulging fontanelle; Behavioral changes (lethargy, irritability, etc); Failure to thrive; Ataxia; Other gait disturbances (hydrocephalus due to aqueduct compression); Cranial nerve abnormalities as a result of brainstem compression
(e) Other specified intracranial and intraspinal neoplasms	CNS tumors are the second most common malignancy diagnosed during childhood, and they are the leading cause of death from cancer in children.	Headache; Nausea and vomiting; Papilledema; Bulging fontanelle; Behavioral changes (lethargy, irritability, etc); Failure to thrive; Ataxia; Other gait disturbances (hydrocephalus due to aqueduct compression); Cranial nerve abnormalities as a result of brainstem compression
(f) Unspecified intracranial and intraspinal neoplasms	CNS tumors are the second most common malignancy diagnosed during childhood, and they are the leading cause of death from cancer in children.	Headache; Nausea and vomiting; Papilledema; Bulging fontanelle; Behavioral changes (lethargy, irritability, etc); Failure to thrive; Ataxia; Other gait disturbances (hydrocephalus due to aqueduct compression); Cranial nerve abnormalities as a result of brainstem compression
IV. Neuroblastoma And Other Peripheral Nervous Cell Tumors
(a) Neuroblastoma and ganglioneuroblastoma	Neuroblastomas are the most common extracranial solid tumor in children.	Dysfunction of the location of the primary tumor; Anorexia; Abdominal pain; Distention
(b) Other peripheral nervous cell tumors	Neuroblastomas are the most common extracranial solid tumor in children.	Dysfunction of the location of the primary tumor; Anorexia; Abdominal pain; Distention
V. Retinoblastoma
Retinoblastoma	Retinoblastomas typically affect children under 3 years old. Most children in resource-rich areas survive but they may lose vision in the affected eye.	Leukocoria; Vision loss; Strabismus
VI. Renal Tumors
(a) Nephroblastoma and other non-epithelial renal tumors	Nephroblastoma, also known as Wilm's tumor, represents the majority of cases of renal tumors in children.	Hematuria; Hypertension; Abdominal mass; Abdominal pain; Fever
(b) Renal carcinomas	Nephroblastoma, also known as Wilm's tumor, represents the majority of cases of renal tumors in children.	Hematuria; Hypertension; Abdominal mass; Abdominal pain; Fever
(c) Unspecified malignant renal tumors	Nephroblastoma, also known as Wilm's tumor, represents the majority of cases of renal tumors in children.	Hematuria; Hypertension; Abdominal mass; Abdominal pain; Fever
VII. Hepatic Tumors
(a) Hepatoblastoma and mesenchymal tumors of liver	Hepatic tumors are relatively rare in children, but are most commonly hepatoblastomas if they do occur.	Jaundice; Hepatomegaly; Abdominal mass; Nausea and vomiting; Ascites; Weight loss; Appetite loss
(b) Hepatic carcinomas	Hepatic tumors are relatively rare in children, but are most commonly hepatoblastomas if they do occur.	Jaundice; Hepatomegaly; Abdominal mass; Nausea and vomiting; Ascites; Weight loss; Appetite loss
(c) Unspecified malignant hepatic tumors	Hepatic tumors are relatively rare in children, but are most commonly hepatoblastomas if they do occur.	Jaundice; Hepatomegaly; Abdominal mass; Nausea and vomiting; Ascites; Weight loss; Appetite loss
VIII. Malignant Bone Tumors
(a) Osteosarcomas	Bone tumors in children typically arise in adolescence. These typically have a good prognosis with chemotherapy, radiation, and surgery if necessary.	Localized bone pain; Pathologic fractures with minimal trauma; Difficulty bearing weight
(b) Chondrosarcomas	Bone tumors in children typically arise in adolescence. These typically have a good prognosis with chemotherapy, radiation, and surgery if necessary.	Localized bone pain; Pathologic fractures with minimal trauma; Difficulty bearing weight
(c) Ewing tumor and related sarcomas of bone	Bone tumors in children typically arise in adolescence. These typically have a good prognosis with chemotherapy, radiation, and surgery if necessary.	Localized bone pain; Pathologic fractures with minimal trauma; Difficulty bearing weight
(d) Other specified malignant bone tumors	Bone tumors in children typically arise in adolescence. These typically have a good prognosis with chemotherapy, radiation, and surgery if necessary.	Localized bone pain; Pathologic fractures with minimal trauma; Difficulty bearing weight
(e) Unspecified malignant bone tumors	Bone tumors in children typically arise in adolescence. These typically have a good prognosis with chemotherapy, radiation, and surgery if necessary.	Localized bone pain; Pathologic fractures with minimal trauma; Difficulty bearing weight
IX. Soft Tissue And Other Extraosseous Sarcomas
(a) Rhabdomyosarcomas	Soft tissue sarcomas can form anywhere in the body as a cancer of the body's supporting tissues, including fat, muscle, and blood vessels.	Localized mass; Swelling or pain; Limited range of motion; Redness or warmth; Skin changes (ulceration, discoloration)
(b) Fibrosarcomas, peripheral nerve sheath tumors and other fibrous neoplasms	Soft tissue sarcomas can form anywhere in the body as a cancer of the body's supporting tissues, including fat, muscle, and blood vessels.	Localized mass; Swelling or pain; Limited range of motion; Redness or warmth; Skin changes (ulceration, discoloration)
(c) Kaposi sarcoma	Soft tissue sarcomas can form anywhere in the body as a cancer of the body's supporting tissues, including fat, muscle, and blood vessels.	Localized mass; Swelling or pain; Limited range of motion; Redness or warmth; Skin changes (ulceration, discoloration)
(d) Other specified soft tissue sarcomas	Soft tissue sarcomas can form anywhere in the body as a cancer of the body's supporting tissues, including fat, muscle, and blood vessels.	Localized mass; Swelling or pain; Limited range of motion; Redness or warmth; Skin changes (ulceration, discoloration)
(e) Unspecified soft tissue sarcomas	Soft tissue sarcomas can form anywhere in the body as a cancer of the body's supporting tissues, including fat, muscle, and blood vessels.	Localized mass; Swelling or pain; Limited range of motion; Redness or warmth; Skin changes (ulceration, discoloration)
X. Germ Cell Tumors, Trophoblastic Tumors And Neoplasms Of Gonads
(a) Intracranial and intraspinal germ cell tumors	These tumors arise from cells that eventually form sperm or eggs. They are often found in the gonads, but can travel to other parts of the body.	Testicular or ovarian swelling; Abdominal pain or fullness; Virilization; Precocious puberty; Abnormal uterine bleeding
(b) Malignant extracranial and extragonadal germ cell tumors	These tumors arise from cells that eventually form sperm or eggs. They are often found in the gonads, but can travel to other parts of the body.	Testicular or ovarian swelling; Abdominal pain or fullness; Virilization; Precocious puberty; Abnormal uterine bleeding
(c) Malignant gonadal germ cell tumors	These tumors arise from cells that eventually form sperm or eggs. They are often found in the gonads, but can travel to other parts of the body.	Testicular or ovarian swelling; Abdominal pain or fullness; Virilization; Precocious puberty; Abnormal uterine bleeding
(d) Gonadal carcinomas	These tumors arise from cells that eventually form sperm or eggs. They are often found in the gonads, but can travel to other parts of the body.	Testicular or ovarian swelling; Abdominal pain or fullness; Virilization; Precocious puberty; Abnormal uterine bleeding
(e) Other and unspecified malignant gonadal tumors	These tumors arise from cells that eventually form sperm or eggs. They are often found in the gonads, but can travel to other parts of the body.	Testicular or ovarian swelling; Abdominal pain or fullness; Virilization; Precocious puberty; Abnormal uterine bleeding
XI. Other Malignant Epithelial Neoplasms And Malignant Melanomas
(a) Adrenocortical carcinomas	These tumors are classified as functioning or non-functioning, depending on whether they produce adrenocortical hormone.	Abdominal mass; Hypertension; Hyperglycemia; Weight gain; Hormone production; Hirsutism; Virilization; Acne; Gynecomastia
(b) Thyroid carcinomas	Thyroid cancers include four main types: papillary, follicular, medullary, and anaplastic. Of these, papillary is the most common in children and anaplastic is rarely seen.	Palpable mass on thyroid; Lymphadenopathy; Hoarseness
(c) Nasopharyngeal carcinomas	This is a rare cancer which forms in the back of the nasal cavity in the throat. It is associated with Epstein-Barr virus infection.	Lymphadenopathy; Bleeding from the nose; Facial numbness; Headaches; Sore throat
(d) Malignant melanomas	Skin cancers are rare in children due to less UV exposure, though may be seen in children with a family history of skin cancer or a genetic condition such as xeroderma pigmentosum.	Skin changes (discoloration, ulceration, etc); Mole or freckle which is growing or changing color; Pruritus
(e) Skin carcinomas	Skin cancers are rare in children due to less UV exposure, though may be seen in children with a family history of skin cancer or a genetic condition such as xeroderma pigmentosum.	Skin changes (discoloration, ulceration, etc); Mole or freckle which is growing or changing color; Pruritus
(f) Other and unspecified carcinomas
XII. Other And Unspecified Malignant Neoplasms
(a) Other specified malignant tumors
(b) Other unspecified malignant tumors

== Risk factors ==
Risk factors are any genetic or environmental exposure that increases the chances of developing a pathological condition. Some examples are age, family history, environmental factors, genetics, and economic status among others. Several chromosomal disorders and constitutional syndromes are also associated with childhood cancer.

=== Demographic risk factors ===
- Childhood cancer varies by age, sex, ethnicity, and race. Its incidence peaks in infancy with about 240 cases/million/year.
- This rate decreases to 128 cases per million from five–nine years of age, and it rises again to 220 cases/million.
- Slight male dominance for most childhood cancers.

=== Environmental factors ===
- High-dose ionizing radiation and certain forms of prior chemotherapy are established risk factors for childhood cancer, each increasing cancer risk severalfold.

=== Genetic factors ===
Identified Cancer Predisposition Syndromes

- Li–Fraumeni syndrome (TP53)
- Hereditary breast or ovarian cancer (BRCA 1/2)
- Colorectal cancer/polyposis syndromes
- Familial retinoblastoma (RB1)
- Familial and genetic factors are identified in 5–15% of childhood cancer cases. In <5–10% of cases, there are known environmental exposures and exogenous factors, such as prenatal exposure to tobacco, X-rays, or certain medications. For the remaining 75–90% of cases, however, the individual causes remain unknown. In most cases, as in carcinogenesis in general, the cancers are assumed to involve multiple risk factors and variables.

Aspects that make the risk factors of childhood cancer different from those seen in adult cancers include:

- Different, and sometimes unique, exposures to environmental hazards. Children must often rely on adults to protect them from toxic environmental agents.
- Immature physiological systems to clear or metabolize environmental substances
- The growth and development of children in phases known as "developmental windows" result in certain "critical windows of vulnerability".

Also, a longer life expectancy in children allows for a longer time to manifest cancer processes with long latency periods, increasing the risk of developing some cancer types later in life.

Advanced parental age has been associated with an increased risk of childhood cancer in the offspring. There are preventable causes of childhood malignancy, such as delivery overuse and misuse of ionizing radiation through computed tomography scans when the test is not indicated or when adult protocols are used.

== Diagnosis ==
=== Types ===
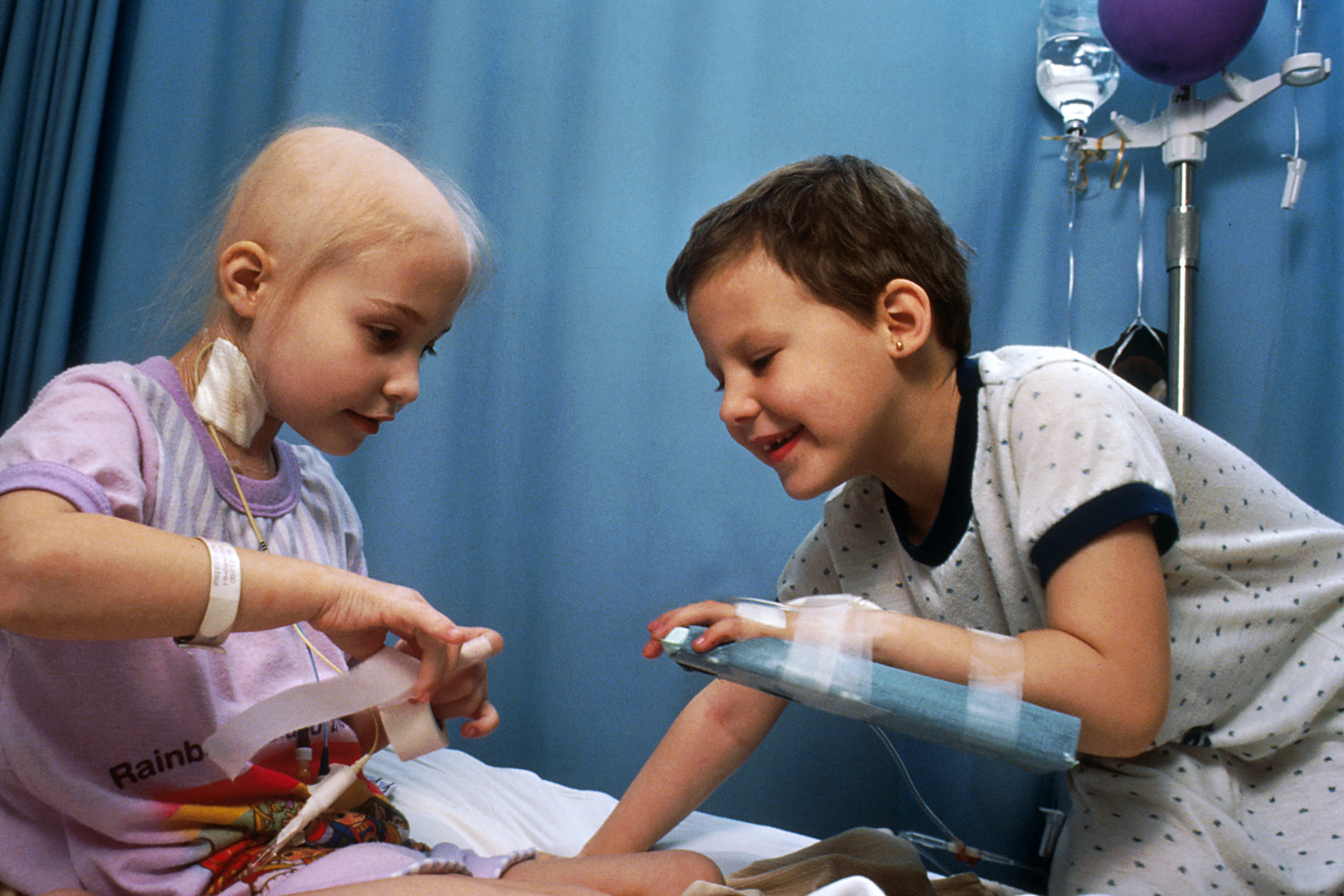
Two girls with acute lymphocytic leukemia demonstrating intravenous access for chemotherapy

The most common childhood cancers (birth – 14 years old) are leukemia (28%), central nervous system tumors (27%), and lymphomas (12%). The main subtypes of brain and central nervous system tumors in children are: astrocytoma, brain stem glioma, craniopharyngioma, desmoplastic infantile ganglioglioma, ependymoma, high-grade glioma, medulloblastoma and atypical teratoid rhabdoid tumor. In 2020–2022, 1.9 per 100,000 children died from cancer.

In 2022, an estimated 4.2 per 100,000 individuals in the United States younger than 20 years were diagnosed with leukemia, and 0.6 per 100,000 died from the disease.[1] In the same year, 2.3 per 100,000 individuals in this age group were diagnosed with cancers of the brain or central nervous system, and 0.6 per 100,000 died from these tumors.[2] The incidence of both leukemia and brain or central nervous system cancers in children and adolescents has declined since 2016 and 2018, respectively.[1][2]

Other, less common childhood cancer types are:

- Neuroblastoma (6%, nervous system)
- Wilms tumor (5%, kidney)
- Non-Hodgkin lymphoma (4%, blood)
- Childhood rhabdomyosarcoma (3%, many sites)
- Retinoblastoma (3%, eye)
- Osteosarcoma (3%, bone cancer)
- Ewing sarcoma (1%, many sites)
- Germ cell tumors (5%, many sites)
- Pleuropulmonary blastoma (lung or pleural cavity)
- Hepatoblastoma and hepatocellular carcinoma (liver cancer)
- Juvenile myelomonocytic leukemia

=== Diagnostic Methods ===
In all cases of suspected cancer, evaluation should begin with a thorough history and physical examination. Techniques used for definitive diagnoses vary by the suspected cancer itself. The first step in evaluation of solid tumors is often imaging of the affected organ or tissue, though a biopsy is typically required for a definitive diagnosis.

For the most common childhood cancer, acute lymphoblastic leukemia, evaluation typically begins with a complete blood count and peripheral blood smear. Lymph node biopsy and flow cytometry may also be utilized, and a bone marrow biopsy is required for definitive diagnosis. Imaging is usually not needed for non-solid tumors such as leukemia, unless metastasis is suspected or there are other concerning examination findings.

Other common diagnostic tests include the following:

- Tumor marker tests
- Urinalysis
- X-ray
- CT scan
- MRI
- Ultrasound
- PET scan

== Medical specialties ==
Overall, treating childhood cancer requires a multidisciplinary team of doctors, nurses, social workers, therapists, and other community members. Here is a brief list of doctors that can treat childhood cancer:

- Pediatric oncologist: These doctors specialize in treating childhood cancers.
- Pediatric hematology-oncologist: These doctors specialize in treating blood diseases in children.
- Pediatric surgeon: These doctors specialize in performing surgery on children.
- Adolescent and young adult oncology (AYA): AYA is a branch of medicine that deals with the prevention, diagnosis, and treatment of cancer in adolescents and young adults, often defined as those aged 13–30. Studies have continuously shown that while pediatric cancer survival rates have gone up, the survival rate for adolescents and young adults has remained stagnant. Additionally, AYA helps patients with college concerns, fertility, and a sense of aloneness. Studies have often shown that treating young adults with the same protocols used in pediatrics is more effective than adult-oriented treatments.

Other specialties that can assist the treatment process include radiology, neurosurgery, orthopedic surgery, psychiatry, and endocrinology.

== Treatment ==
Childhood cancer treatment is individualized and varies based on the severity and type of cancer. In general, treatment can include surgical resection, chemotherapy, radiation therapy, or immunotherapy.

Recent medical advances have allowed for an improved understanding of the genetic basis of childhood cancers. Treatment options are expanding, and precision medicine for childhood cancers is a rapidly growing area of research.

The side effects of chemotherapy can result in immediate and long-term treatment-related comorbidities. For children undergoing treatment for high-risk cancer, more than 80% experience life-threatening or fatal toxicity as a result of their treatment.

=== Psychosocial care ===
Psychosocial care of children with cancer is also important during the cancer journey, but the implementation of evidence-based interventions need to be further spread across pediatric cancer centers. In general, psychosocial care can include therapy with a psychologist or psychiatrist, referral to a social worker, or referral to a pastoral counselor. Family-centered psychosocial care is one approach that can be used to not only support the patient's psychosocial well-being but also support the parents and any caregivers of the patient.

==== Play therapy ====
One type of psychosocial care for children with cancer is play therapy, which means that the child is using an essential part of childhood to increase mental and physical well-being while reducing the negative emotions that come from being in the hospital. Children need to engage in play, even if they are in a hospital. Some types of play therapy use distraction tactics for intervening on anxiety, while also allowing children to communicate their feelings by reflecting on abilities and emotions that they are using as they adapt to the new environment of the hospital.

There are multiple types of play therapy, including medical play, pretend play, or direct play. Medical play reduces anxiety and stress by using medical tools or equipment to explain fears of treatments, procedures, and hospital settings. Other types of play therapy include drawing therapy, painting therapy, puzzle therapy, and storytelling. Drawing, painting, storytelling, and puzzle play therapy are relaxing techniques that do not take too much energy from the patient, so they can avoid fatigue while also engaging in psychosocial and mental development, and creativity. Further, these are accessible types of therapy for children as they are easy to engage in, affordable, and liked by children.

Drawing, painting, puzzle therapy, and storytelling as play therapy techniques all help to reduce anxiety and fear in a hospital setting, which also helps to increase cooperative behavior in children with cancer. Play therapy is effective not only for just the children but also for improving relationships between hospital staff and children. Improving this relationship can lead to children being more open about their fears and anxieties and help them gain a sense of independence.

In children with leukemia, it has been found that play therapy decreases adverse psychosocial outcomes, like pain and fatigue.

==== Family therapy ====
Family therapy is important because it allows for bonding time within a family, which can increase social support for both the patient and the family. Family therapy is child-parent interaction based, giving the family time to have conversations and understand what they are feeling. Parents are able to be supported in having conversations about treatment or medical conditions, where they may have had trouble beforehand. By incorporating care for each member, families are better able to reach a state of life that was similar to the one before a diagnosis. Starting therapy at diagnosis before treatment can be more beneficial because it will also act as a preventative measure. The time of diagnosis is when families tend to be most stressed and carry the most negative emotions.

Family therapy can be used for all ages. Children at younger ages can benefit from play therapy and children at older ages need more communication-based therapy. Overall, family therapy can improve the quality of life of children with cancer and improve mental health. It can also alleviate the effects of depression, anxiety, and poor quality of life that other family members have.

==== Cognitive behavioral therapy ====
The diagnosis, treatment, and survivorship process for children with cancer is extremely distressing for both the patient and family. Psychosocial care provides support, care, and skills for patients to address distress and psychological illness. Cognitive behavioral therapy (CBT) can have a significant positive impact on patients and families. CBT includes aspects of cognitive therapy, challenging maladaptive assumptions, and relaxation training. CBT for childhood cancer patients can reduce anxiety, depression, pain, and behavioral distress. Over time, CBT has proven to reduce stress and levels, while increasing self-efficacy.

==== Palliative Care ====
Aspects such as pain, fatigue, nausea and vomiting, and anxiety were improved in children with the use of specialty palliative care. Children's overall quality of life improved, with some experiencing fun events towards the end of life. Families gained positive satisfaction from these programs.

== Prognosis ==
With the advancement of new treatments for childhood cancer, 85% of individuals who had childhood cancer now survive five years or more. This is an increase from the mid-1970s when only 58% of children with childhood cancer survived five years or more. However, this survival rate is dependent on many factors such as the type of cancer, age of onset, location of the cancer, cancer stage, and if there is any genetic component to cancer. Survival rate is also impacted by socioeconomic status and access to resources during treatment.

Since adult survivors of childhood cancer are living longer, these individuals may experience long-term complications that are associated with their cancer treatment. This can include problems with organ function, growth and development, neurocognitive function and academic achievement, and risk for additional cancers.

Premature heart disease is one example of a major long-term consequence seen in adult survivors of childhood cancer. These individuals are eight times more likely to die of heart disease than other people, and up to one quarter of the children treated for cancer develop some type of cardiac abnormality, mainly left ventricular systolic dysfunction although this may be asymptomatic or too mild to qualify for a clinical diagnosis of heart disease. Survivors of childhood cancer, previously treated with anthracycline chemotherapy (including mitoxantrone) or radiotherapy in which the heart was exposed, are at increased risk of cardiomyopathy.

Childhood cancer survivors are also at risk of sustaining adverse effects on the kidneys and the liver. Specific cancer treatments such as cisplatin, carboplatin, and radiotherapy are known to cause kidney damage. The risk of liver damage is increased in those who have had radiotherapy to the liver and in those with other risk factors, such as a higher body mass index or chronic viral hepatitis. Certain treatments and liver surgery may also increase the risk of adverse liver effects in childhood cancer survivors.

To help monitor for these long-term consequences, a set of guidelines has been created to facilitate long-term follow-up for childhood, adolescent, and young adult cancer survivors. This guides healthcare professionals on providing high-quality follow-up care and appropriate monitoring. These guidelines also help healthcare providers collaborate with oncology specialists to create recommendations specific to an individual patient.

=== Quality of life in survivors ===
Usually, quality of life improves with time since diagnosis, especially for children with solid tumors and hematological malignancies. Children treated for brain tumors, on the other hand, show little or no improvement over time. Quality of life is often measured both during and after treatment, but international comparisons of both outcomes and predictors are hindered by the use of a large number of different measurements. Recently, a first step for a joint international consensus statement for measuring quality of life in survivors of childhood cancer has been established.

=== Sleep problems after childhood cancer ===
As with Quality of Life, children treated for brain tumors suffer from sleep problems to a greater extent than after other types of childhood cancer. Unfortunately, very few evidence-based treatments exist for these types of sleep problems, which differ from those seen in healthy children. Additionally, there are currently no existing clinical guidelines for treating sleep disturbances in pediatric oncology. Longitudinal studies describing the prevalence of sleep disturbances across the cancer trajectory have not been published, but cross-sectional studies indicate that sleep disturbances are highest during treatment and the year after treatment, and that they remain elevated compared to healthy peers into long-term survivorship.

=== Fatigue after childhood cancer ===
Cancer-related fatigue has been found to be the long-term side effect that survivors themselves find the most distressing. As with sleep and quality of life, those treated for brain tumors report more fatigue than after other types of cancer, and additionally, they do not recover over time to the same extent. The location of the tumor does not affect this trajectory, and instead, other medical and psychological factors play a role for the development of fatigue over time. Fatigue can sometimes be difficult to distinguish from depression in this patient group, due to an overlap of symptoms. A Nordic study on usage of antidepressant drugs in 5-year survivors of childhood cancer reported that childhood cancer survivors had a higher risk of antidepressant use, and that those treated for brain tumors had the highest risk for antidepressant drug use.

=== Learning problems ===
Children with cancer are at risk for developing various cognitive or learning problems. These difficulties may be related to brain injury stemming from cancer itself, such as a brain tumor or central nervous system metastasis or from side effects of cancer treatments such as chemotherapy and radiation therapy. Studies have shown that chemo and radiation therapies may damage the brain white matter and disrupt brain activity.

This cognitive problem is known as post-chemotherapy cognitive impairment (PCCI) or "chemo brain." This term is commonly used by cancer survivors who describe having thinking and memory problems after cancer treatment. Researchers are unsure what exactly causes chemo brain, however, they say it is likely to be linked to either cancer itself, the cancer treatment, or be an emotional reaction to both.

This cognitive impairment is commonly noticed a few years after a child endures cancer treatment. When a childhood cancer survivor goes back to school, they might experience lower test scores, problems with memory, attention, and behavior, as well as poor hand-eye coordination and slowed development over time. Children with cancer should be monitored and assessed for these neuropsychological deficits during and after treatment. Patients with brain tumors can have cognitive impairments before treatment and radiation therapy is associated with an increased risk of cognitive impairment. Parents can apply their children for special educational services at school if their cognitive learning disability affects their educational success.

==== Academic struggles ====
Survivors of childhood cancer face potential academic struggles after their treatment, having a 36% higher chance of not going on to higher education. This is coupled with survivors being twice as likely to need special education support, 7% more likely not to complete high school, and 13% more likely not to complete college. Children with a cancer diagnosis before adolescence have a reduced chance of finishing high school, but not college.

Childhood cancer survivors with cancer involving the central nervous system were 58% more likely than survivors of cancer not involving the central nervous system to struggle in secondary education. In college, survivors of central nervous system involvement cancer were 49% more likely than non-central nervous system cancer survivors to struggle. Those without central nervous system involvement did similarly to their peers who had not had cancer, while those with involvement continued to struggle.

While undergoing treatment, children's school attendance typically reduces due to the treatment and side-effects. These prolonged absences cause social and academic issues when facing school re-entry. The social component that school provides community and helps many children experience normalcy while undergoing treatment or in the survivorship phase. For some, school can elicit social anxiety and lower confidence, marking the importance of a re-entry plan. The transition from private schooling or tutoring during treatment to in-person school can be overwhelming and intimidating.

In the initial stages of school re-entry, many children report a lack of concentration, which is commonly associated with fatigue and nausea. Some children have a harder time catching up on schoolwork and receive lower grades, no matter the effort they put into school. Struggling with concentration can influence academic achievement and may show a need for special educational support. Participation in physical education classes may be difficult for many childhood cancer patients, especially those with more recent treatments, highlighting the need for informed and open-minded school teachers and faculty.

Children's inclusion in school and social events, during both treatment and survivorship, and informed teachers help make the re-entry process easier for children. Additionally, flexible school environments, access to individualized educational support, if needed, and needs assessments at school can limit academic struggles for children with cancer.

== Epidemiology ==
Epidemiology is the study of the distribution and determinants of disease frequency in the human population and the study of how to control health problems. Internationally, the greatest variation in childhood cancer incidence occurs when comparing high-income countries to low-income ones. This may result from differences in being able to diagnose cancer, differences in risk among different ethnic or racial population subgroups, as well as differences in risk factors. An example of differing risk factors is in cases of pediatric Burkitt lymphoma, a form of non-Hodgkin lymphoma that sickens 6 to 7 children out of every 100,000 annually in parts of sub-Saharan Africa, where it is associated with a history of infection by both Epstein-Barr virus and malaria. In industrialized countries, Burkitt lymphoma is not associated with these infectious diseases. Non-Hispanic white children often have a better chance of survival compared to other racial and ethnic groups. Where an individual lives is one of the biggest determinants of health in the world, as illness and healthcare options can vary by an individual's postal code.

=== United States ===
In the United States, cancer is the second most common cause of death among children between the ages of 1 and 14 years, exceeded only by unintentional injuries such as injuries sustained in a car wreck. In the 2025 American Cancer Society report, more than 18 out of every 100,000 children and teens in the U.S. were diagnosed with cancer, and nearly 3 of every 100,000 died from the disease. In 2025, it is estimated there were 9,550 new cases and 1,050 deaths from cancer among children 0 to 14 years of age. It is also estimated that one in every 264 children and adolescents will be diagnosed with any type of cancer before the age of 20 years.

The survival rate of children with cancer has improved since the late 1960s which is due to improved treatment and public health measures. The estimated proportion surviving 5 years from diagnosis increased from 77.8 percent to 82.7 percent to 85 percent for those diagnosed in the 1990s, 2000s, and 2017–2021.

Childhood Cancer Incidence and Survival
Ages	Incidence (all cancers)	Incidence (malignant)	Survival % (malignant)
Childhood (birth to 14)	184.8	168.0	85
Adolescence (15 to 19)	269.2	230.2	87

Note: Incidence rates are per 1,000,000 population, based on diagnoses during 2017–2021, and age-adjusted to the US standard population. Survival rates are based on malignant diagnoses during 2014 through 2020, all followed through 2021.

=== Sub-Saharan Africa ===
A large number of children in Africa live in low- and middle-income countries where there is limited access to prevention or treatment of cancer. The under-five mortality rate (U5MR), a robust indicator of child health, is 109 per 1,000 live births. The proportion of childhood cancer is higher in Africa than in developed countries, at 4.8%. Kids with cancer are disadvantaged compared to kids in developed countries; therefore their statistic for childhood cancer is higher. In sub-Saharan Africa, 10% of children die before their 5th birthday, yet it is not due to cancer; communicable diseases such as malaria, cholera, and other infections are the leading cause of death. Children with cancer are often exposed to these preventable infections and diseases. Tumor registries only cover 11% of the African population, and there is a significant absence in death registration, making the mortality database unreliable. Overall, there is a lack of reliable data, as there is limited funding and many diseases are largely unknown to this population.

=== United Kingdom ===
Cancer in children is rare in the UK, with an average of 1,800 diagnoses every year but contributing to less than 1% of all cancer-related deaths. Age is not a confounding factor in mortality from the disease in the UK. From 2014 to 2016, approximately 230 children died from cancer, with brain/CNS cancers being the most commonly fatal type.

== Foundations and fundraising ==
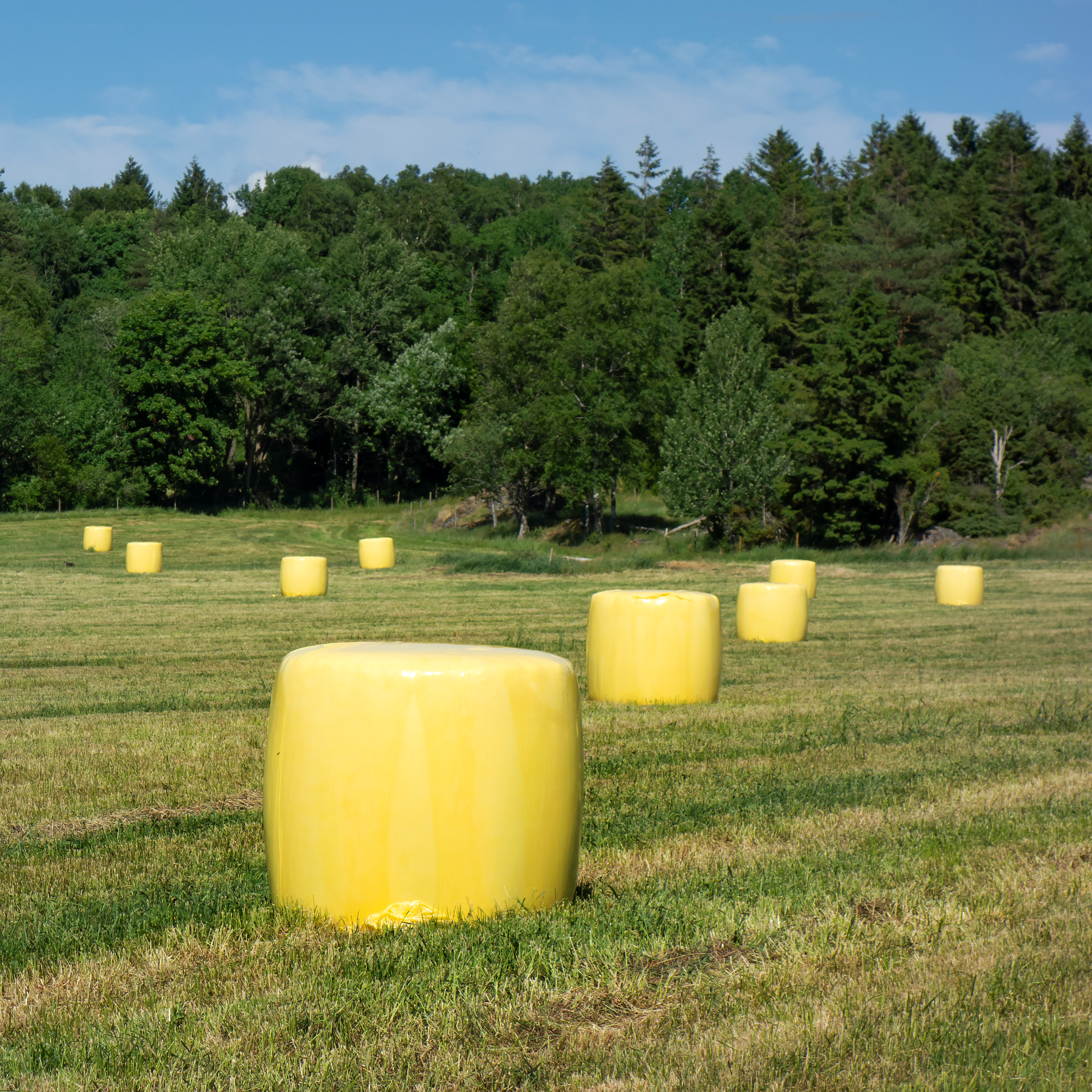
Part of the proceeds from the sale of yellow silage wrappings goes to childhood cancer research, Brastad, Sweden.

Currently, there are various organizations whose main focus is fighting childhood cancer. Organizations focused on childhood cancer through cancer research and/or support programs include: Childhood Cancer Canada, Young Lives vs Cancer and the Children's Cancer and Leukaemia Group (in United Kingdom), Child Cancer Foundation (in New Zealand), Children's Cancer Recovery Foundation (in United States), American Childhood Cancer Organization (in United States), Childhood Cancer Support (Australia) and the Hayim Association (in Israel). Alex's Lemonade Stand Foundation allows people across the US to raise money for pediatric cancer research by organizing lemonade stands. The National Pediatric Cancer Foundation focuses on finding less toxic and more effective treatments for pediatric cancers. This foundation works with 24 different hospitals across the US in search of treatments effective in practice. Childhood Cancer International is the largest global pediatric cancer foundation. It focuses on early access to care for childhood cancers, focusing on patient support, and patient advocacy.

The story of Bella Rodriguez-Torres, a Miami child who died of stage four alveolar rhabdomyosarcoma, inspired the creation of the #LiveLikeBella movement and the Live Like Bella Childhood Cancer Foundation, another resource for families who have children suffering from cancer, which supports through advocacy, financial assistance, and awareness campaigns.

According to estimates by experts in the field of pediatric cancer, by 2020, cancer will cost $158 million annually for both research and treatment which marks a 27% increase since 2010. Ways in which the foundations are helped by people include writing checks, collecting spare coins, bake/lemonade sales, donating portions of purchases from stores or restaurants, or Paid Time Off donations as well as auctions, bike rides, dance-a-thons. Additionally, many of the major foundations have donation buttons on their respective websites.

In addition to advancing research focusing on cancer, the foundations also offer support to families whose children are affected by the disease. The estimated total cost for one child with cancer (medical costs and lost parental wages) is $833,000. Organizations such as the National Children's Cancer Society and the Leukemia and Lymphoma Society can provide financial assistance for the costs associated with childhood cancer like medical care, home care, child care, and transportation.

=== Importance of family support ===
Parents of children with cancer frequently experience emotional distress, which can affect their ability to support the child undergoing treatment, care for siblings, and maintain overall family stability.[67] Support networks can help mitigate these challenges. Various foundations fund in-hospital and online support programs intended to assist parents and families in coping with the demands of illness.[131] Targeted support for siblings is also considered important; age-, gender-, and context-specific resources may help siblings understand and manage cancer-related emotional responses.[132] These interventions have been associated with improved family functioning, increased participation in family activities, and better long-term adjustment.[132][133][134]

"International Childhood Cancer Day" occurs annually on February 15.
