= Abdullah Ayub =

Malaysian civil servant

Yang Amat Berbahagia Tun Dato' Seri Abdullah Ayub SSM SPCM SPMJ PMN PSM PGDK DPSK DPMT DPCM JMN KMN

6th Chief Secretary to the Government of Malaysia
- In office 1 January 1979 – 30 November 1982
- Monarchs: Yahya Petra; Ahmad Shah
- Prime Minister: Hussein Onn; Mahathir Mohamad
- Preceded by: Abdullah Mohd Salleh
- Succeeded by: Hashim Aman

Personal details
- Born: 3 January 1926 Sitiawan, Perak, Federated Malay States
- Died: 13 December 2018 (aged 92) Institut Jantung Negara, Kuala Lumpur, Malaysia
- Resting place: Bukit Kiara Muslim Cemetery, Kuala Lumpur, Malaysia
- Spouse(s): Puteh Rafeah Arifin (died 2001); Anna Abdul Ranee
- Education: University of Malaya

Abdullah bin Ayub (3 January 1926 – 13 December 2018) was a Malaysian civil servant who served as the 6th Chief Secretary to the Government of Malaysia from 1 January 1979 to 30 November 1982.

== Early life ==
Abdullah was born on 3 January 1926 in Pasir Panjang Laut, Sitiawan, Perak. He graduated with a B.A (hons) from University of Malaya, Singapore in 1953. In the same year, he was also awarded the "Queen's Scholarship" for his outstanding achievements.

== Death ==
Abdullah died on 13 December 2018 at the National Heart Institute (IJN) in Kuala Lumpur. He was 92. He was laid to rest at the Bukit Kiara Muslim Cemetery, Kuala Lumpur.

== Honours ==
- Malaysia
  - Officer of the Order of the Defender of the Realm (KMN) (1964)
  - Companion of the Order of the Defender of the Realm (JMN) (1970)
  - Commander of the Order of Loyalty to the Crown of Malaysia (PSM) – Tan Sri (1976)
  - Commander of the Order of the Defender of the Realm (PMN) – Tan Sri (1979)
  - Grand Commander of the Order of Loyalty to the Crown of Malaysia (SSM) – Tun (2011)
- Johor
  - Knight Grand Commander of Order of the Crown of Johor (SPMJ) – Dato' (1980)
- Sabah
  - Commander of the Order of Kinabalu (PGDK) – Datuk
- Terengganu
  - Knight Commander of Order of the Crown of Terengganu (DPMT) – Dato'
- Kelantan
  - Knight Commander of Order of the Loyalty to the Crown of Kelantan (DPSK) - Dato'
- Perak
  - Knight Commander of the Order of Cura Si Manja Kini (DPCM) – Dato' (1973)
  - Knight Grand Commander of the Order of Cura Si Manja Kini (SPCM) – Dato' Seri (1979)

Preceded by Abdullah Mohd Salleh	Chief Secretary to the Government; 1979–1982	Succeeded by Hashim Aman
