= Merl Grove High School =

Location
- 77-79 Constant Spring Road; Kingston 10, Surrey; Jamaica
- 18.0273°N 76.7963°W

Information
- School type: Secondary Institution
- Motto: Labor Omnia Vincit (Hard Work Overcomes All Difficulties)
- Established: 1924
- Founder: Nathaniel Speid
- School board: Majorie Fullerton,
- Principal: Marjorie Fullerton
- Grades: 7-13
- Houses: Gibson -Green; Karram- Orange; Manley- Blue; Sherlock- Red; Speid- Yellow; Walker-Purple
- Colours: Blue and Gold
- Sports: Track and field, Hockey, Cheerleading, Netball, Cadet, Basketball
- Nickname: MGHS
- Team name: GEMS

Merl Grove High School is a high school in Kingston, Jamaica.
