= Eric Pacey =

Canadian lacrosse player

Personal information
- Born: May 3, 1978 (age 47) Toronto, Ontario, Canada
- Height: 6 ft 2 in (188 cm)
- Weight: 222 lb (101 kg; 15 st 12 lb)

Sport
- Position: Defenseman
- Shoots: Right
- NLL team Former teams: Minnesota Swarm; Toronto Rock; Montreal Express; Ottawa Rebel
- Pro career: 2002–

Eric Pacey (born May 3, 1978 in Toronto, Ontario) was a professional lacrosse player for the Minnesota Swarm of the National Lacrosse League. He was acquired in a trade with the Toronto Rock prior to the 2005 season and served as the assistant captain of the Swarm for five seasons. He also played junior hockey for the London Knights of the Ontario Hockey League and at York University.

== Statistics ==
=== NLL ===
		Regular Season						Playoffs
Season	Team	GP	G	A	Pts	LB	PIM	GP	G	A	Pts	LB	PIM
2002	Montreal	11	7	6	13	23	17	--	--	--	--	--	--
2003	Ottawa	13	3	5	8	45	11	--	--	--	--	--	--
2004	Toronto	1	0	0	0	3	0	--	--	--	--	--	--
2005	Minnesota	13	2	5	7	37	14	--	--	--	--	--	--
2006	Minnesota	13	2	3	5	45	20	1	1	0	1	3	0
2007	Minnesota	12	1	5	6	27	40	1	0	0	0	2	0
2008	Minnesota	15	2	8	10	45	12	1	0	0	0	12	2
2009	Minnesota	9	0	3	3	29	8	--	--	--	--	--	--
2010	Minnesota	13	3	2	5	28	23	1	0	0	0	2	0
2011	Minnesota	8	0	2	2	14	16	1	0	0	0	2	2
NLL totals		108	20	39	55	296	161	5	1	0	1	21	4
