= Childhood Cancer Canada =

Canadian cancer foundation

Childhood Cancer Canada (CCC) is a foundation dedicated to fighting childhood cancer. It was founded in 1987. The foundation works to improving the lives of children with cancer and their families through its support programs and investment in collaborative cancer research. It has a partnership with all of Canada's 17 childhood cancer hospitals and treatment centres.

== Funding and promotion of childhood cancer research ==
Childhood Cancer Canada is an active partner of the C17, the Council of Pediatric Haematologists/Oncologists. This council represents the pediatric oncology leaders from all of Canada's 17 children's hospitals and cancer treatment centres.

== Support and resource programs for children with cancer and their families ==
CCC administers support programs, including the emPower Pack, Scholarship Programs, Benevolent Fund, Teen Connector and several programs. They provide information and resources to families.
