= Central nervous system tumor =

- Specialty: Oncology, neurology

A central nervous system tumor (CNS tumor) is an abnormal growth of cells from the tissues of the brain or spinal cord. CNS tumor is a generic term encompassing over 120 distinct tumor types. Common symptoms of CNS tumors include vomiting, headache, changes in vision, nausea, and seizures. A CNS tumor can be detected and classified via neurological examination, medical imaging, such as x-ray imaging, magnetic resonance imaging (MRI) or computed tomography (CT), or after analysis of a biopsy.

== Types ==
Below is a list of the most common pediatric CNS- tumors (children's brain tumors). The list is based on the WHO classification of CNS tumors and on the pediatric cancer register Deutsches Kinderkrebsregister | Übersicht and Surveillance, Epidemiology, and End Results Program. The American Cancer Society estimated the number of new cases of pediatric CNS tumors in the US in 2019 to be 23,820, and the number of deaths attributable to CNS tumors to be 17,760.

The incidence rates of the most common brain tumors for adult patients is very different, with meningiomas being the most common tumor, accounting for 38% of all cases, and with a much higher mortality each year.

Tumor classification	Frequency as % of total CNS tumors
Pilocytic astrocytomas	~30%
Diffuse astrocytomas	~12%
Anaplastic astrocytomas	~2%
Glioblastomas	~3%
Oligodendroglial tumors	~1.5%
Ependymal tumor	~9%
Medulloblastomas	~20%
Pineal tumors	~1.5%
Meningeal tumors	~1.2%
Germ cell tumors	~3%

== Symptoms ==
The most common symptoms of CNS tumors are headache, vomiting, and nausea. Symptoms vary depending on the tumor and may include unsteady gait, slowed speech, memory loss, loss of hearing and vision, problems with memory, narrowing of visual field, and back pain. Symptoms may also vary greatly between individuals with the same tumor type.

In pediatric patients, symptoms may include:

- Headache
- Changes in vision
- Nausea and vomiting
- Balance problems
- Seizures
- Behavioral changes
- Abnormal head position
- Delayed puberty
- Abnormal growth
- Excessive thirst
- Reduced consciousness

Some symptoms in adults are specific to the location of the tumor:

- Tumors in the cerebrum, which controls movement, may cause weakness or numbness to the body. This weakness is often limited to one side of the body.
- Tumors in the Broca's area of the cerebrum can cause speech difficulties. In extreme cases, the patient may have problems understanding words.
- Tumors in the premotor cortex and the primary motor cortex, which are located at the front and top of the cerebrum, may cause sloppy movements, trouble walking, difficulties in moving arms, hands, fingers, and legs. In severe cases, such tumors may even cause wallowing and abnormal eye movements.
- Tumors located in the lower part of the cerebrum near the primary visual cortex can cause blurred vision, double vision, or loss of vision.
- Tumors located in the spinal cord usually have symptoms that start with back pain that spreads towards the arms or legs. These tumors can cause trouble urinating or walking.

== Causes ==
The causes of CNS tumors are poorly understood. A few risk factors are known, including radiation exposure, genetic disorder, a family history of CNS tumors, immunodeficiency, stress and a history of previous cancers. As with all cancers, the risk of developing a CNS tumor increases with age.

=== Inheritance ===
A number of genetic disorders increase the risk of specific types of CNS tumors. These include tuberous sclerosis, Von Hippel–Lindau Hippel-Lindau disease, Li-Fraumeni syndrome, Gorlin syndrome, Mismatch repair cancer syndrome, Cowden Syndrome and neurofibromatosis types 1 and 2 (NF1/NF2). Patients with NF1 have high risks of having schwannomas, meningiomas, and some types of gliomas. NF2 is correlated with vestibular schwannomas.

== Diagnosis ==
There are no recommended tests to diagnose CNS tumors. The tumor is usually found when patients develop symptoms and visit the doctor. The first step in diagnosis is usually a neurological exam, including tests for reflexes, muscle strength, vision and eye movements, and balance and alertness. If the results are abnormal, additional tests carried out by a specialist such as a neurosurgeon or a neurologist may be recommended.

Adults and children both undergo a similar set of tests to diagnose CNS tumors, including:

- Medical history
- Blood test
- Urine test
- Medical imaging
- X-ray
- CT scan
- MRI
- Biopsy

Most patients who have CNS tumors do not have a family record of the disease.

=== Imaging ===
Imaging is an important method for diagnosing CNS tumors and determining their location. The location is informative both for identifying the type of tumor and for determining how to treat it. Magnetic resonance imaging (MRI) and computed tomography (CT) scans are the most commonly used imaging technologies for diagnosis of CNS tumors. MRI provides better detail and detection of tumor-infiltrated areas.

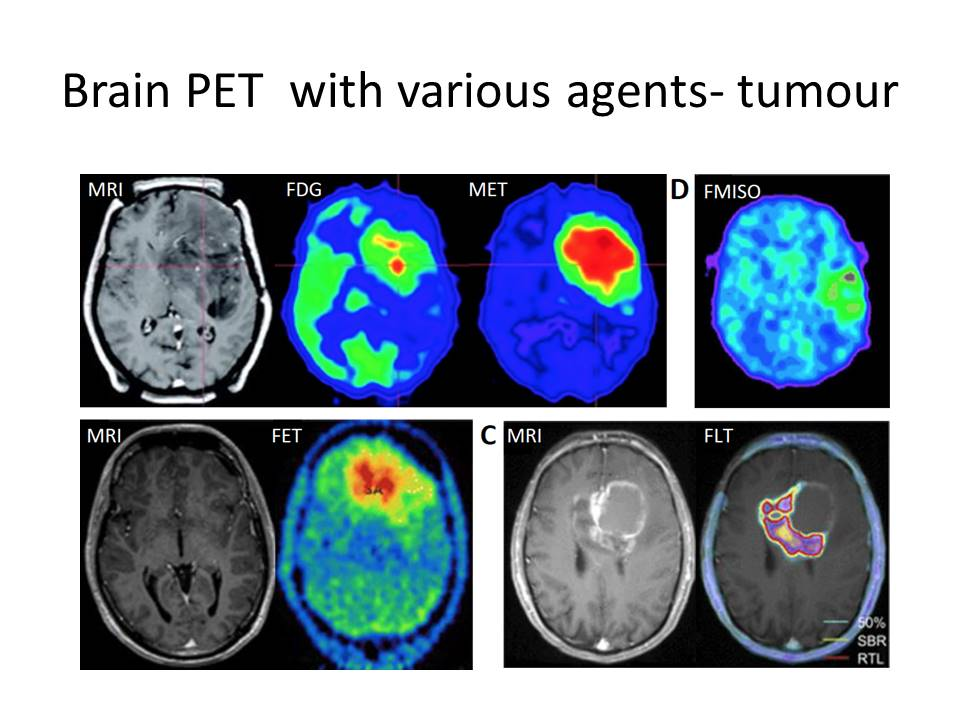
Examples of CNS tumors imaged using positron emission tomography (PET)

==== Magnetic Resonance Imaging ====
Magnetic resonance imaging uses strong magnetic fields, magnetic field gradients, and radio waves to generate images of the structure of the brain. In perfusion MRI a contrast agent, such as gadolinium compounds, may be used to study the structure of the blood vessels around the tumor that provide nutrients and remove waste. The contrast agent may be taken by mouth or injected into the patient before the scan.

==== Magnetic Resonance Spectroscopy ====
Magnetic resonance spectroscopy (MRS) is a variant of MRI used to measure biochemical changes in the brain. Comparing the metabolites detected in normal brain tissue with those in affected brain tissue can help determine the type of tumor and estimate how quickly it is growing.

==== Computed tomography ====
Computed tomography (CT) technologies include X-ray CT, positron emission tomography (PET) and single-photon emission computed tomography (SPECT). X-ray CT scans take many X-ray measurements from different angles to produce virtual "slices" of specific areas of a scanned object that can then be reassembled into a complete image of the object. Such scans can detect tumors by the swelling and anatomical distortion they cause, or by surrounding edema. While CT scans are widely available and produce images rapidly, MRI scans provide better anatomic detail of brain structures and detection of tumor-infiltrated areas.

=== Biopsy ===
A biopsy is the definitive way to diagnose CNS tumors. Because of the difficulty of accessing brain tissue, and the risk of damage to the brain, biopsies may be guided by computer and imaging in a stereotactic surgery procedure. A stereotactic biopsy is performed under local anesthesia or general anesthesia. After the MRI or a CT scan, the scalp or scalp contours are marked to show the position of where to drill or cut the scalp. An image guidance system is then used to provide assistance in directing a needle into the tumor to collect a small tissue sample. The sample is analyzed by a pathologist or neuropathologist to determine whether the tumor is benign or malignant and identify the type of tumor. Biopsies can also be performed as part of an operation to remove the tumor mass.

=== Blood tests ===
Blood tests such as a complete blood count (CBC) can provide insight into the progress of a tumor by measuring the number of blood cell types such as white blood cells, red blood cells and platelets. Blood chemistry is also used to check the health of the liver, kidneys and other organs. Many tumors shed microscopic extracellular vesicles into the bloodstream that can be used to monitor the progress of a cancer or its response to therapy.

== Treatment ==
CNS tumors are typically treated using one or more of the following options:

- Surgery
- Radiation Therapy
- Chemotherapy
- Targeted therapy
- Active surveillance

Treatment of CNS tumors frequently involves a team of doctors working together, including neurosurgeons, neurologists, medical oncologists, radiation oncologists and endocrinologists.

=== Surgery ===
Surgeries are used both to diagnose and to treat CNS tumors. Removal of tumor tissues helps decrease the pressure of the tumor on nearby parts of the brain. The main goal of surgery is to remove as much as possible of the tumor mass while preserving normal brain function, and to relieve the symptoms caused by the tumor such as headache, nausea and vomiting. Some tumors are deep-seated and unsafe to remove, and in these cases the role of surgery may be limited to obtaining a diagnostic biopsy. After the surgery, chemotherapy or radiation therapy may be used to destroy the remaining cancer cells.

=== Radiation therapy ===
Radiation therapy uses high energy rays to destroy cancer cells or to shrink tumors. The kind of rays used are x-rays, gamma rays, electron beams or protons.

According to the National Cancer Institute, there are two types of radiation therapy:

- external radiation therapy
- internal radiation therapy

External radiation therapy or teletherapy uses a machine that sends a focused beam of radiation directed at the location of the tumor in the body. The radiation may be delivered from several angles or in a shaped beam to maximize the dose delivered to the tumor while reducing the harm to healthy parts of the body. Treatment is commonly given daily for 4–8 weeks.

In internal radiation therapy, the source of radiation is inserted into the patient's body. This may be done by placing a solid source of radiation adjacent to the tumor in the form of a seed, ribbon or capsule (brachytherapy) or by giving the patient a liquid source of radiation that travels through the body and kills cancer cells (system therapy). In this case the radiation is usually given in the form of injections, ingesting a capsule or through an intravenous line.

=== Chemotherapy ===
Chemotherapy is a treatment that uses a tumor-killing drug to prevent the growth of cancer cells by stopping them from dividing. It is often used after surgery or as the first line of treatment. The drug may be given systemically, by injection into a vein or by mouth, or may be injected into the fluid that surrounds the brain and spinal cord to allow the drug to reach the tumor without crossing the blood–brain barrier (intrathecal administration).

Common side effects of chemotherapy include:

- Hair loss
- Mouth sores
- Loss of appetite
- Nausea
- Diarrhea
- Increased rate of infections
- Easy bruising and bleeding
- Fatigue

=== Targeted therapy ===
An increasing number of drugs are available that promise to target a tumor specifically, reducing harm to normal cells. These therapies are matched to the specific tumor, and include antibodies that bind to specific surface molecules found primarily on the tumor, or small molecules that target proteins mutated in the tumor. Targeted therapies may block enzymes or other proteins necessary for cancer cell proliferation, deliver toxic substances directly to cancer cells, help with immune system function, or prevent the tumor from obtaining the nutrients it needs. For example, bevacizumab is a targeted therapy drug used against various cancers, including glioblastoma, that blocks the blood supply to and therefore the proliferation of cancerous tumors. Checkpoint inhibitors, which prevent the tumor from blocking the action of tumor-killing cells of the immune system. are also being tested for CNS tumor therapy. Although targeted therapy may have fewer side effects than other forms of cancer treatment, side effects are still frequent and may include high blood pressure, fatigue, increased risk of infection, or diarrhea.

=== Active surveillance ===
All treatments for CNS tumors have significant risks and side-effects. In cases where tumors are slow growing and do not cause symptoms, it may be preferable to closely watch the patient's condition without any treatment, until new test results or symptoms indicate that the patient's condition has worsened.

== Sources ==
- Frühwald, Michael C; Rutkowski, Stefan (2011). "Tumors of the Central Nervous System in Children and Adolescents". Deutsches Ärzteblatt International. 108 (22): 390–397. doi:10.3238/arztebl.2011.0390. PMC 3123765. PMID 21712972.
- PDQ Adult Treatment Editorial, Board (2002). "Adult Central Nervous System Tumors Treatment (PDQ®): Patient Version". National Cancer Institute (US). PMID 26389458.
- "Adult Central Nervous System Tumors Treatment (PDQ®)–Patient Version". National Cancer Institute. 15 November 2019.
- Brain and other central nervous system tumors | Cancer Australia Children's Cancers. (2019). Retrieved from https://childrenscancer.canceraustralia.gov.au/types-childrens-cancers/brain-and-cns-tumors
- Signs and Symptoms of Adult Brain and Spinal Cord Tumors. (2019). Retrieved from Signs and Symptoms of Adult Brain and Spinal Cord Tumors
- Momota, Hiroyuki; Holland, Eric C. (27 October 2009). "Mouse models of CNS embryonal tumors". Brain Tumor Pathology. 26 (2): 43–50. doi:10.1007/s10014-009-0253-0. PMID 19856214. S2CID 11901684.
