= Palace =

Grand residence, especially a royal or episcopal one

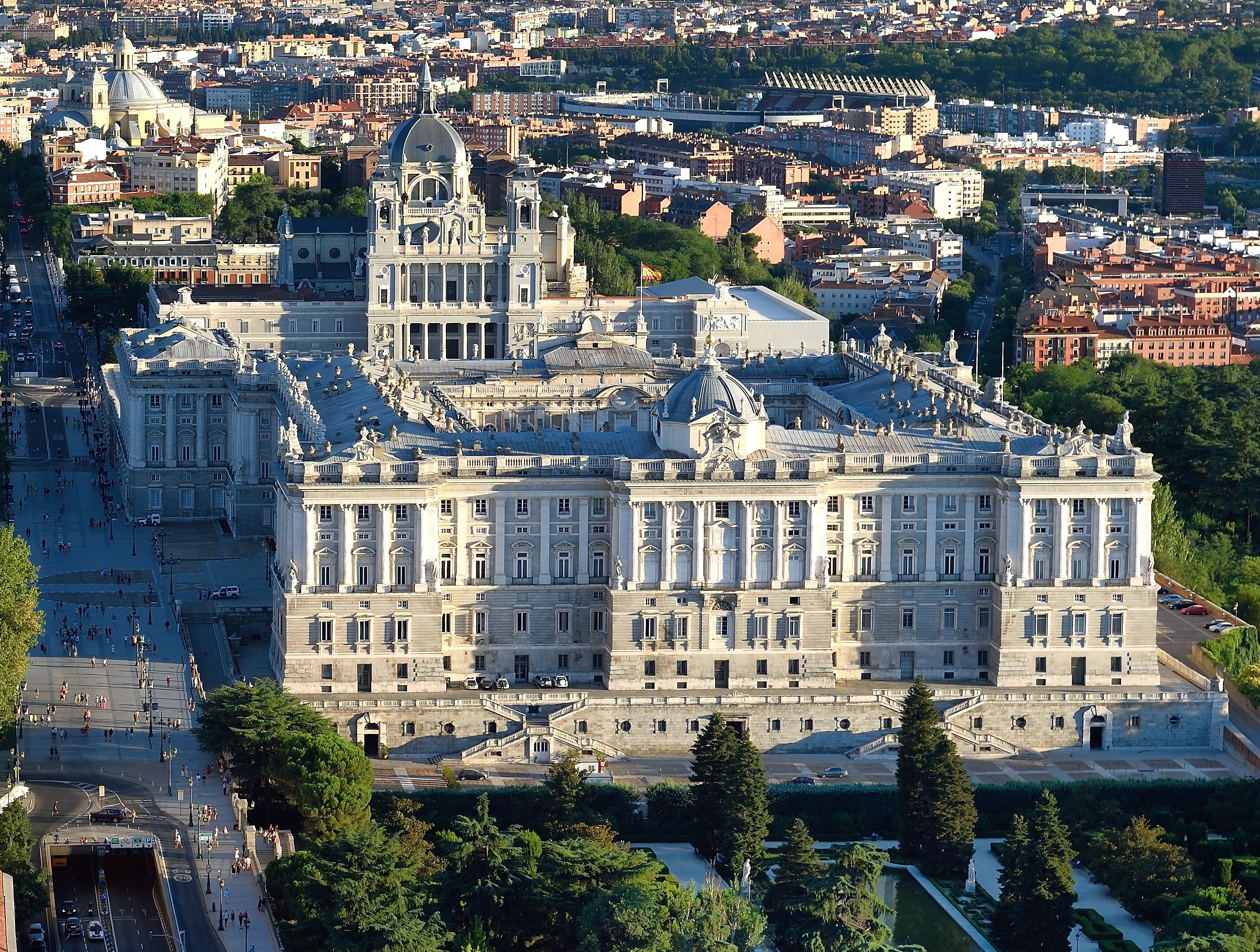
The Royal Palace of Madrid is the official residence of the Spanish royal family. It is the largest royal palace in Europe, as well as one of the largest in the world.

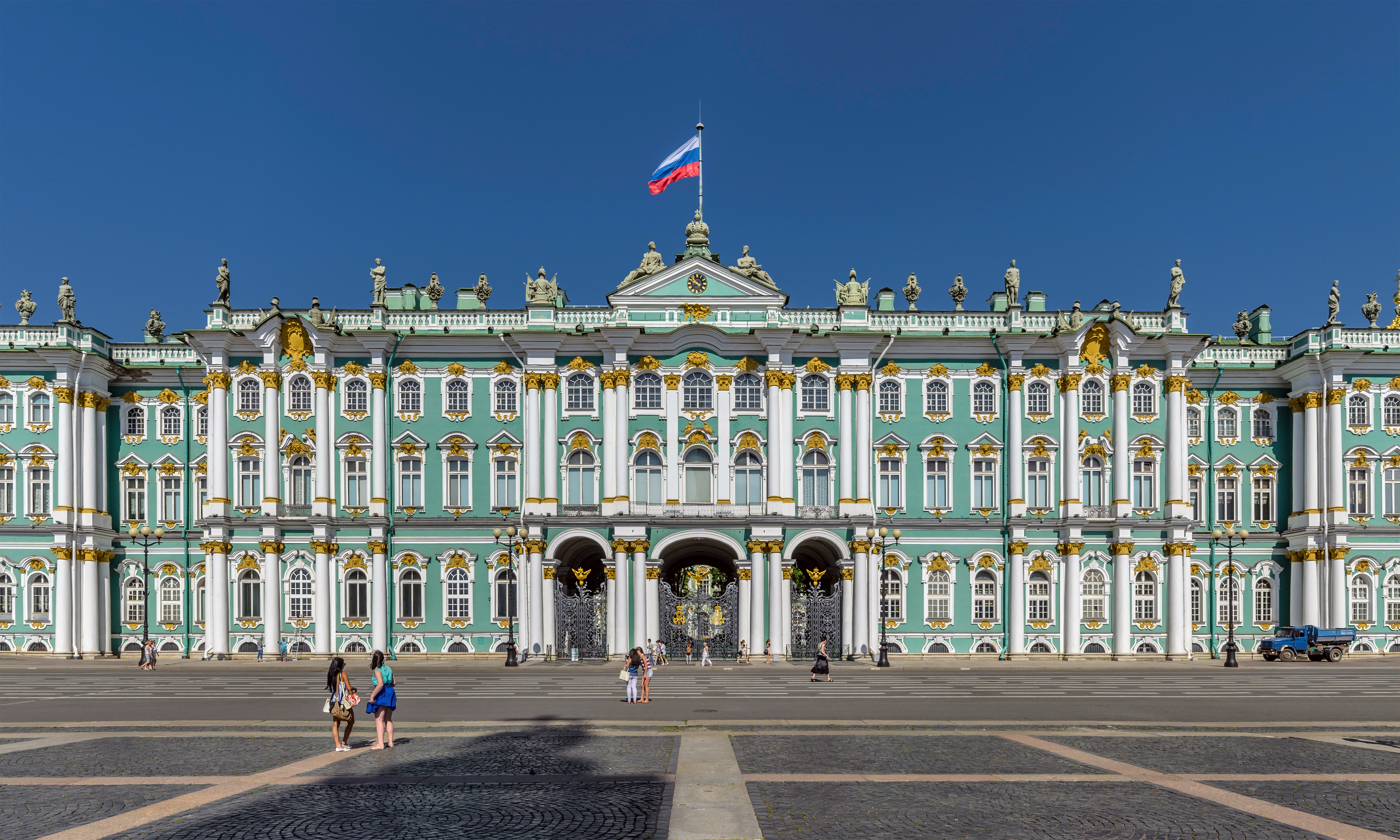
The Winter Palace, an imperial palace in Saint Petersburg, Russia; which served as the official residence of the Russian emperors.

A palace is a large residence, often serving as a royal residence or the home for a head of state or another high-ranking dignitary, such as a bishop or archbishop. The word is derived from the Latin word palātium, for Palatine Hill in Rome, which housed the Imperial residences.

Most European languages have a version of the term (palats, palais, palazzo, palacio, etc.) and many use it to describe a broader range of buildings than English. In many parts of Europe, the equivalent term is also applied to large private houses in cities, especially of the aristocracy. It is also used for some large official buildings that have never had a residential function; for example in French-speaking countries Palais de Justice is the usual name of important courthouses. Many historic palaces such as parliaments, museums, hotels, or office buildings are now put to other uses. The word is also sometimes used to describe an elaborate building used for public entertainment or exhibitions such as a movie palace.

A palace is typically distinguished from a castle in that the latter is fortified or has the style of a fortification, whereas a palace does not.

== Etymology ==
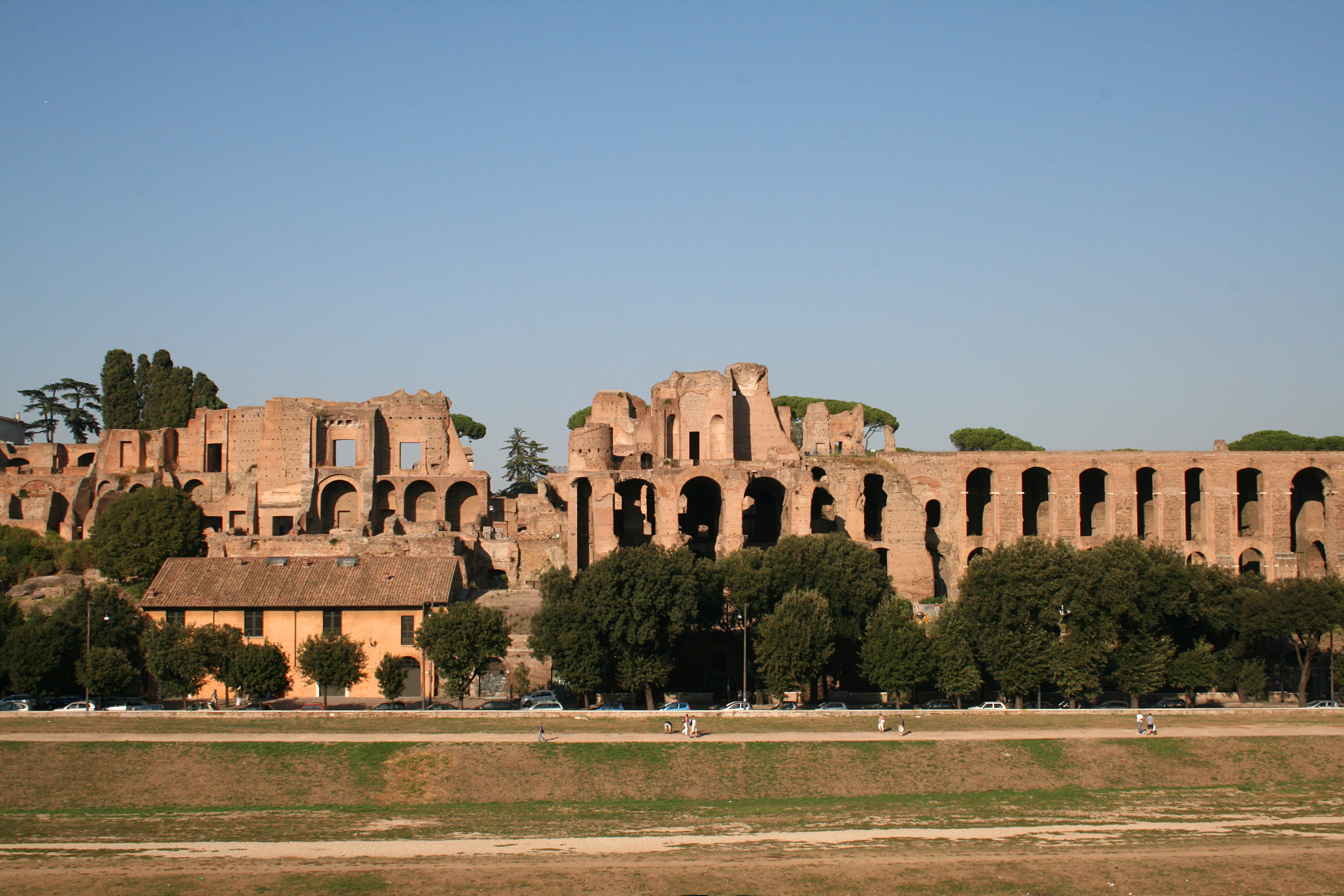
Domus Augustana of Palatine Hill in Rome, Italy, the origin of the term "palace"

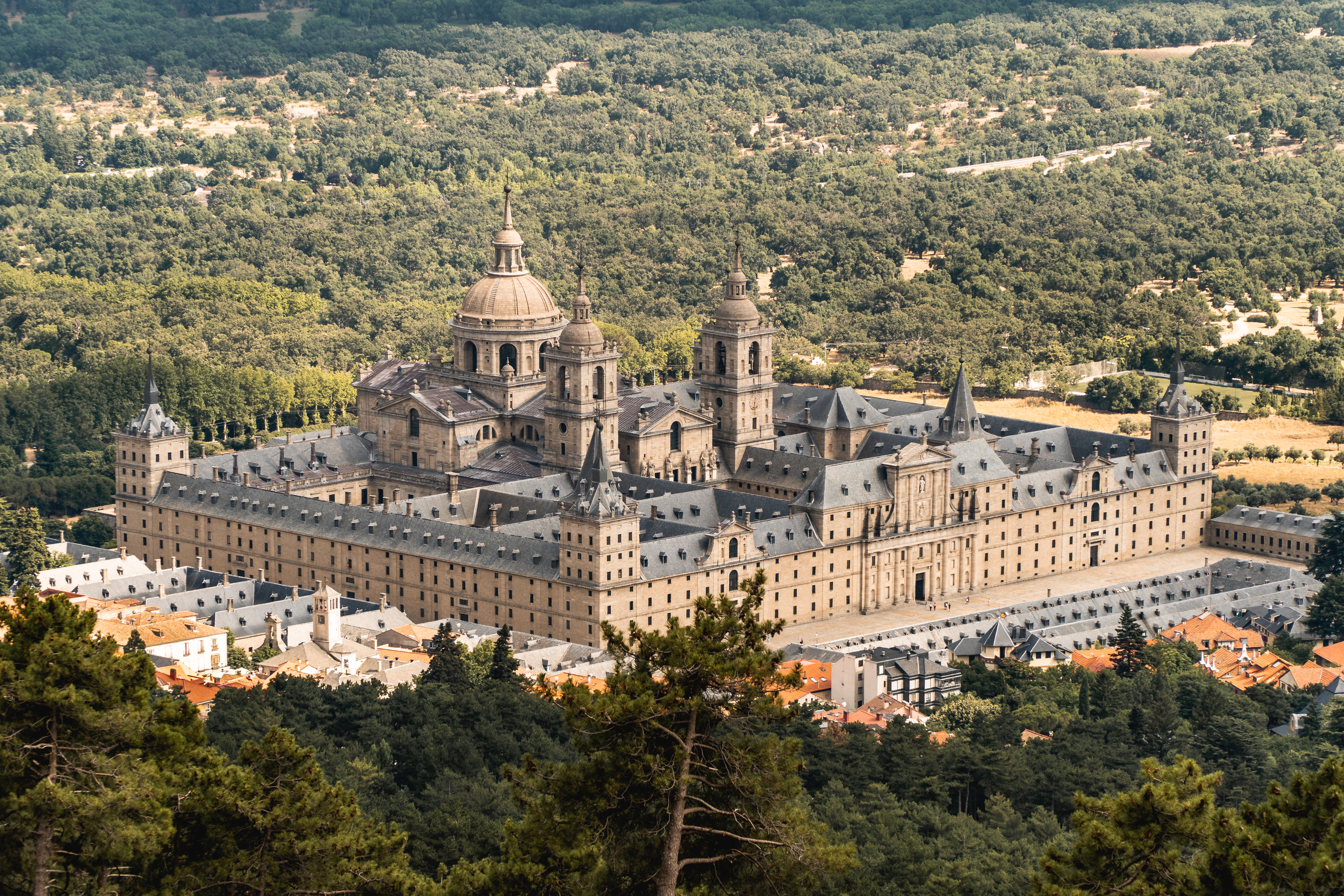
The Royal Site of San Lorenzo de El Escorial, in Spain, is a Renaissance complex that has functioned as a royal palace, monastery, basilica, pantheon, library, museum, university and hospital.

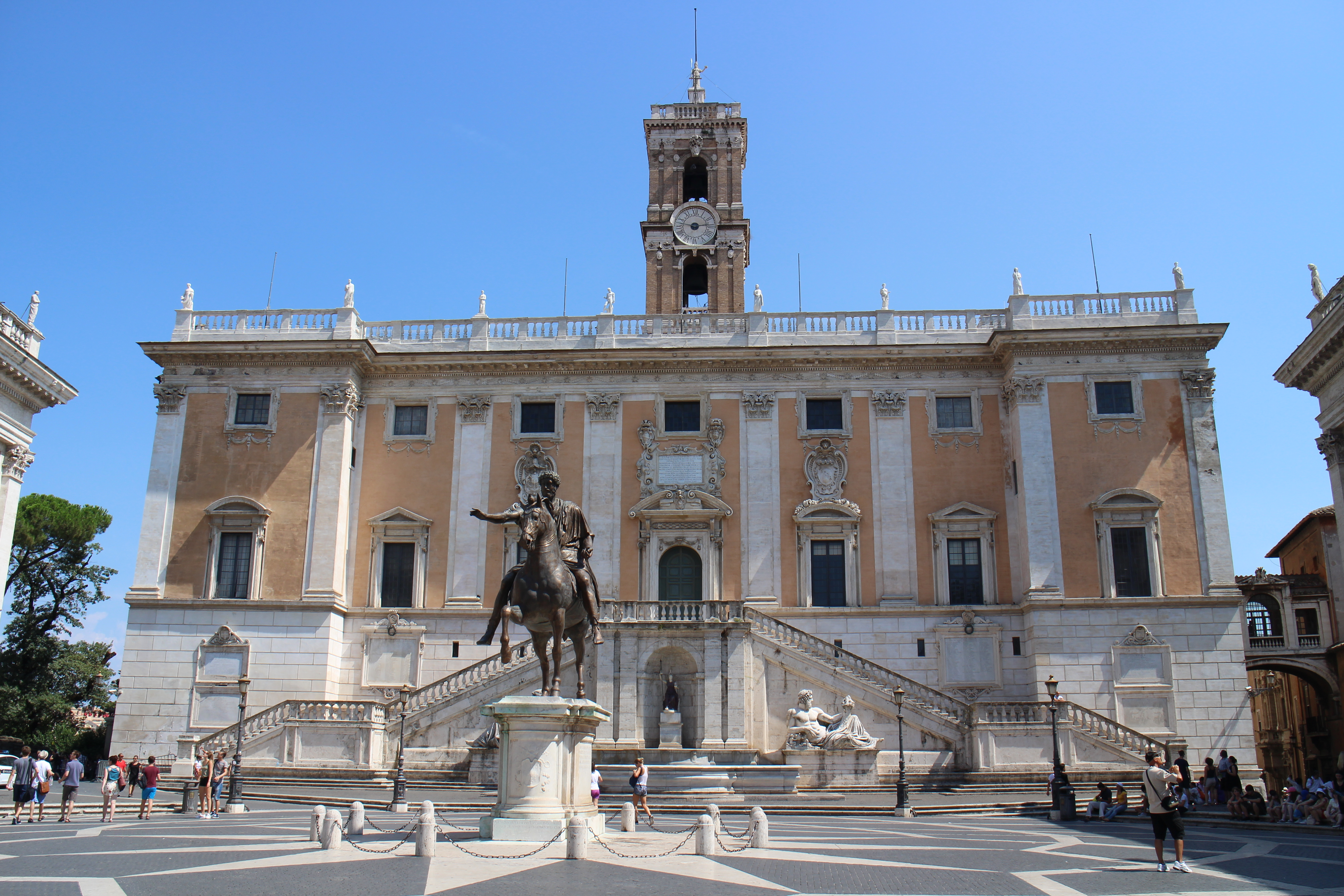
Palazzo Senatorio, seat of the municipality of Rome, Italy. It has been a town hall since 1144, making it the oldest town hall in the world.

The word palace comes from Old French palais (imperial residence), from Latin Palātium, the name of one of the seven hills of Rome. The original "palaces" on the Palatine Hill were the seat of the imperial power. At the same time, the "capitol" on the Capitoline Hill was the religious nucleus of Rome. Long after the city grew to the seven hills, the Palatine remained a desirable residential area. Roman emperor Caesar Augustus lived there in a purposely modest house only set apart from his neighbours by the two laurel trees planted to flank the front door as a sign of triumph granted by the Senate. His descendants, especially Nero with his "Domus Aurea" (the Golden House), enlarged the building and its grounds over and over until it took up the hilltop. The word Palātium came to mean the residence of the emperor rather than the neighbourhood on top of the hill.

Palace, meaning "government", can be recognized in a remark of Paul the Deacon, writing c. 790 AD and describing events of the 660s: "When Grimuald set out for Beneventum, he entrusted his palace to Lupus" (Historia Langobardorum, V.xvii). At the same time, Charlemagne was consciously reviving the Roman expression in his "palace" at Aachen, of which only his chapel remains. In the 9th century, the "palace" indicated the government's housing too, and Charlemagne constantly traveled, building fourteen. In the early Middle Ages, the palas was usually that part of an imperial palace (or Kaiserpfalz) that housed the Great Hall, where affairs of state were conducted; continued to be used as the seat of government in some German cities. In the Holy Roman Empire, the powerful independent Electors came to be housed in palaces (Paläste). This has been used as evidence that power was widely distributed in the Empire; as in more centralized monarchies, only the monarch's residence would be a palace.

In modern times, archaeologists and historians have applied the term to large structures that housed combined rulers, courts, and bureaucracy in "palace cultures". In informal usage, the term "palace" can be extended to a grand residence.

== Ancient palaces ==
The Minoans were among the first in human history to construct what can truly be considered palaces. The earliest known example in the architectural sense—a large, organized complex serving political, economic, religious, and administrative functions—is the Palace of Knossos on the island of Crete, built by the Minoan civilization around 2000 BC, nearly 4,000 years ago.

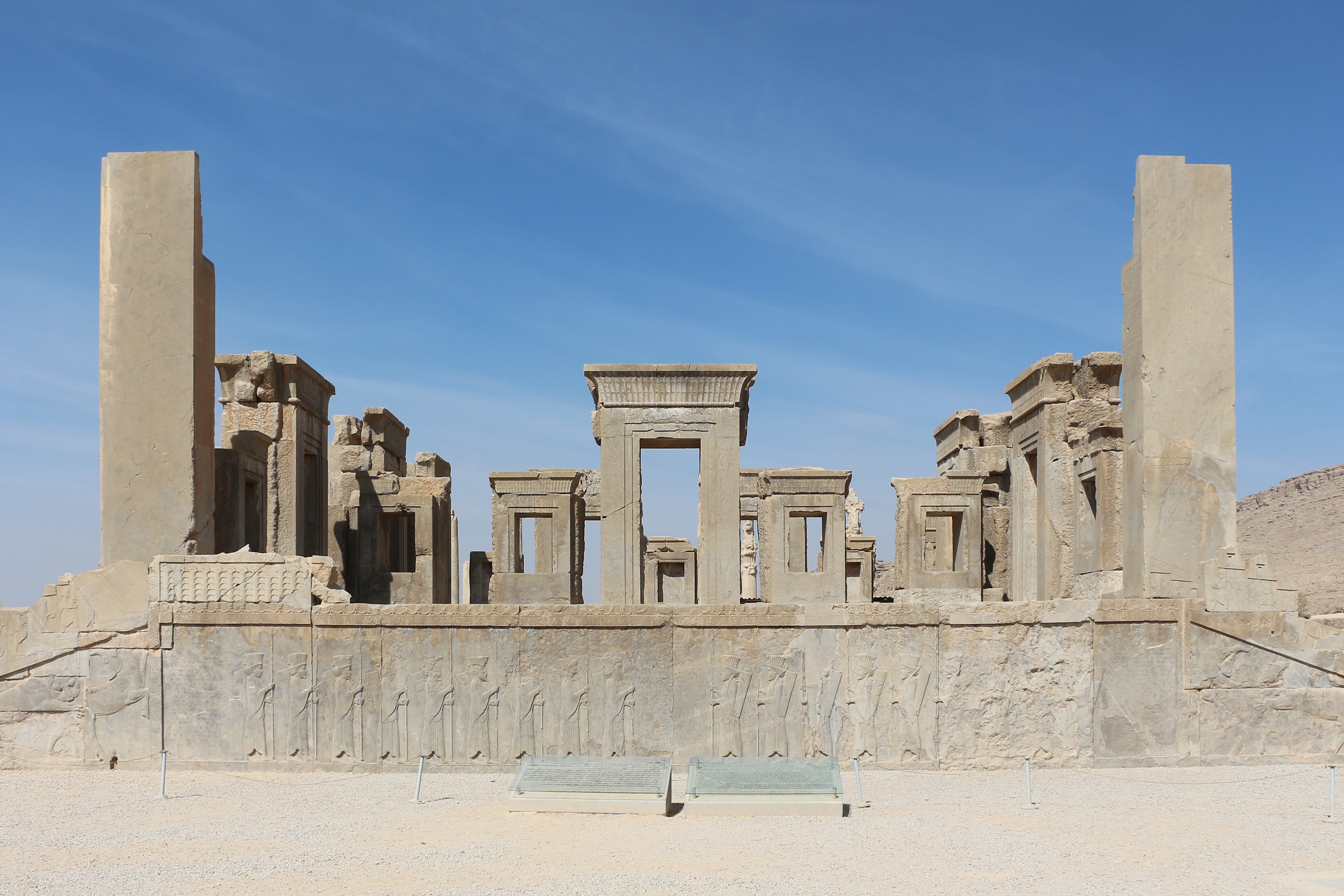
Palace of Darius I in Persepolis, the imperial capital of Persia

Early ancient palaces include the Assyrian palaces at Nimrud and Nineveh and the Persian palaces at Persepolis and Susa. The Minoans built complexes referred to in modern times as Minoan palaces, though scholars now generally do not think they functioned as royal residences (or that there was royalty for them to house).

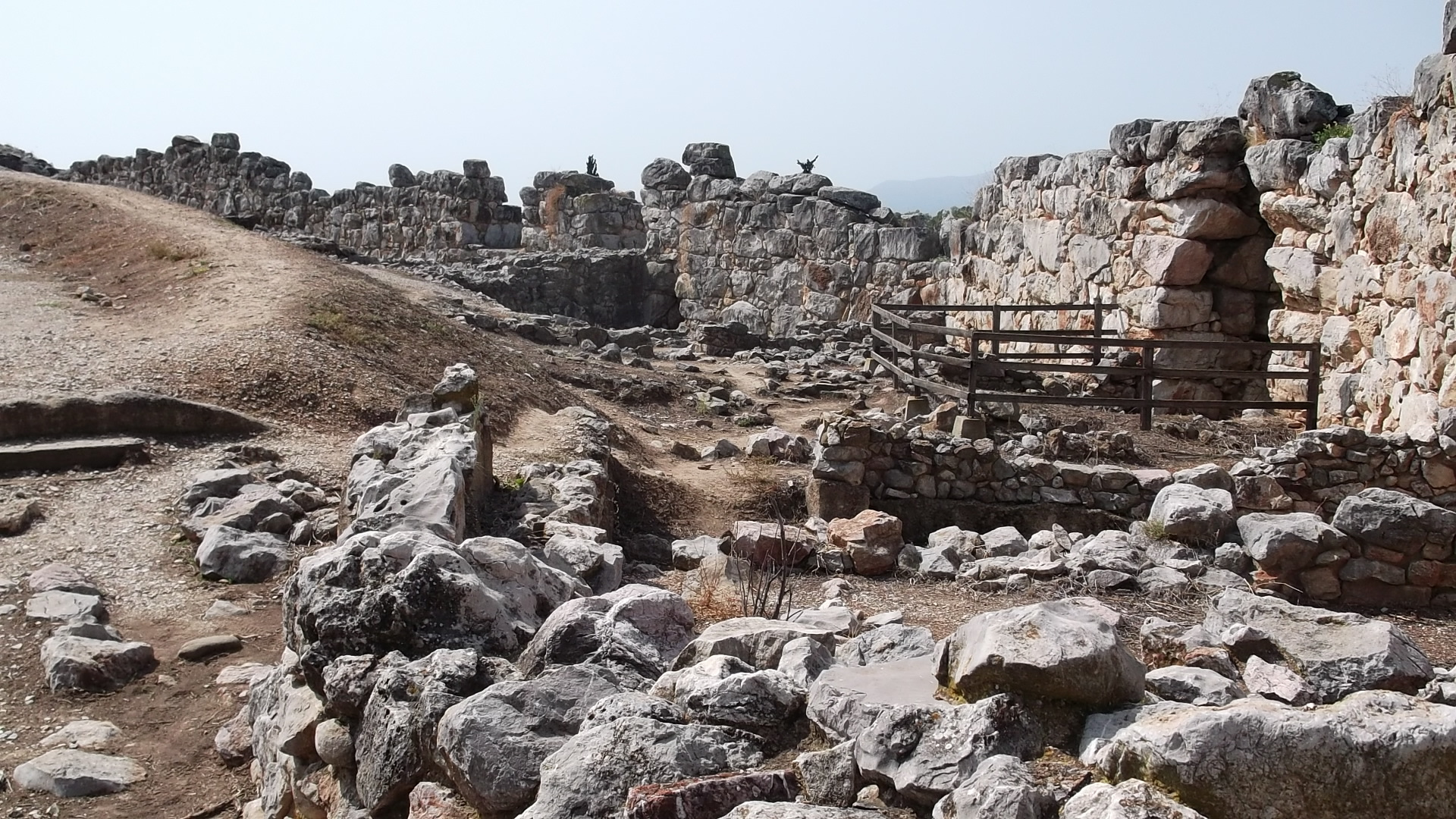
Tiryns palace, Argolis, Greece

The best examples of Bronze Age Greece palaces are seen in the excavations at Mycenae, Tiryns and Pylos. The fact that these were administrative centers is shown by the records found there. They were ranged around a group of courtyards, each opening upon several rooms of different dimensions, such as storerooms and workshops, as well as reception halls and living quarters, each opening upon several rooms of different dimensions, such as storerooms, workshops, and reception halls. The heart of the palace was the megaron. This was the throne room, laid around a circular hearth surrounded by four columns, the throne generally found on the right-hand side upon entering the room. The staircases in the palace of Pylos indicate palaces had two stories. Located on the top floor were the private quarters of the royal family and some storerooms. These palaces have yielded a wealth of artifacts and fragmentary frescoes.

The Palace of Domitian in Rome is the overall name given to the complex of palaces that were the primary residence in Rome of the Roman emperors from the late 1st century to the 5th. Some sculptures and decorative elements have been excavated. The Domus Aurea was a different palace, begun by Nero, where excavations from the Renaissance onwards have discovered remarkably well-preserved paintings in levels now below ground.

Diocletian's Palace in Split, Croatia was ready for occupation in 305 AD and is much the most significant ancient survival, having been turned in the Middle Ages into a fortified town; it still houses many people and businesses.

Palaces in East Asia, such as the imperial palaces of Japan, Korea, Vietnam, Thailand, and Indonesia, and large wooden structures in China's Forbidden City, consist of many low pavilions surrounded by vast, walled gardens in contrast to the single building palaces of Medieval Western Europe. Palaces were also built by post-classical African kingdoms such as the Ashanti Empire. Before its destruction during the Third Anglo-Ashanti War, the Ashanti royal palace at Kumasi, Ghana was described by English explorers Thomas Edward Bowdich and Winwood Reade as "an immense building of a variety of oblong courts and regular squares."

== Medieval palaces ==
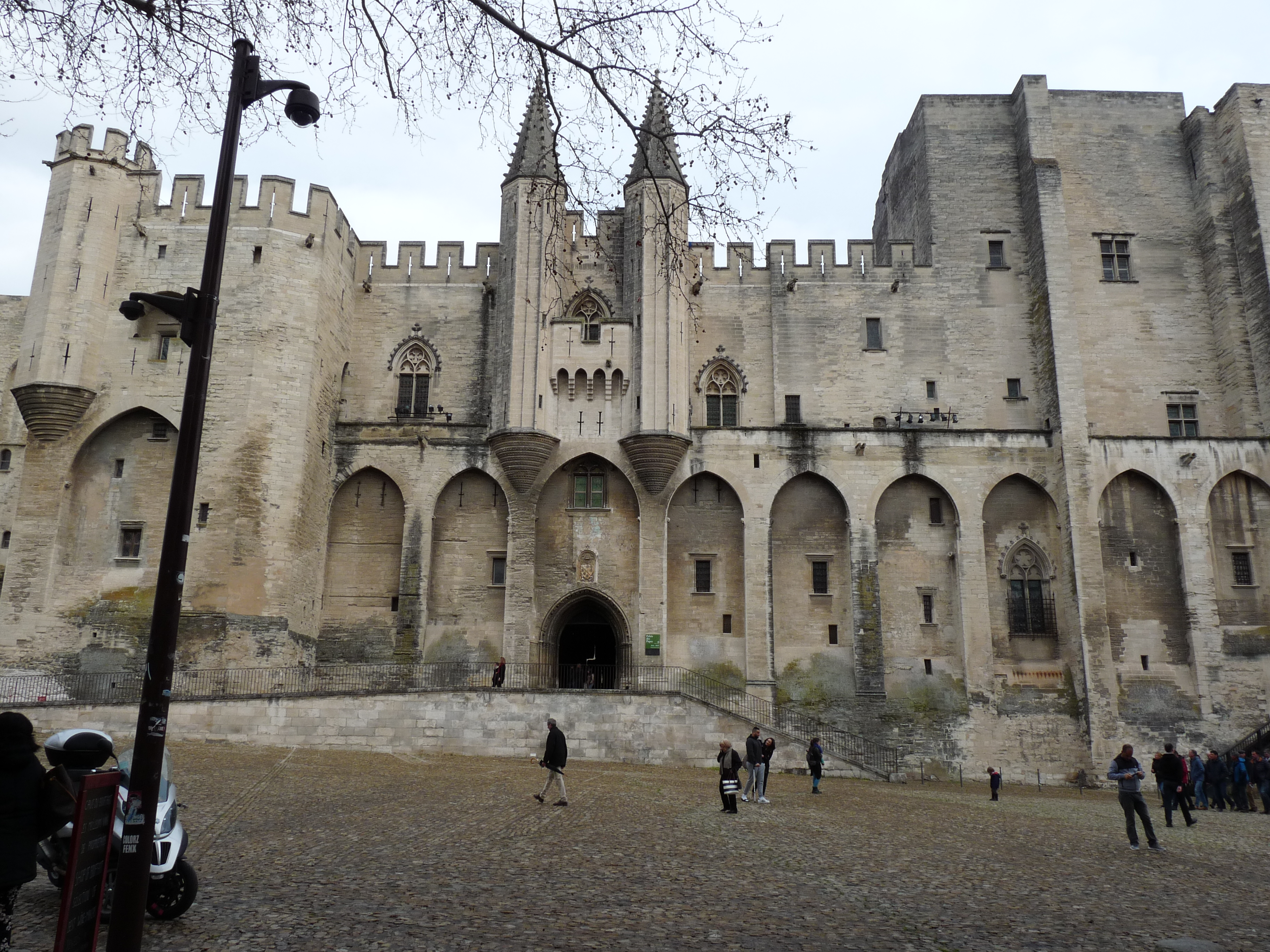
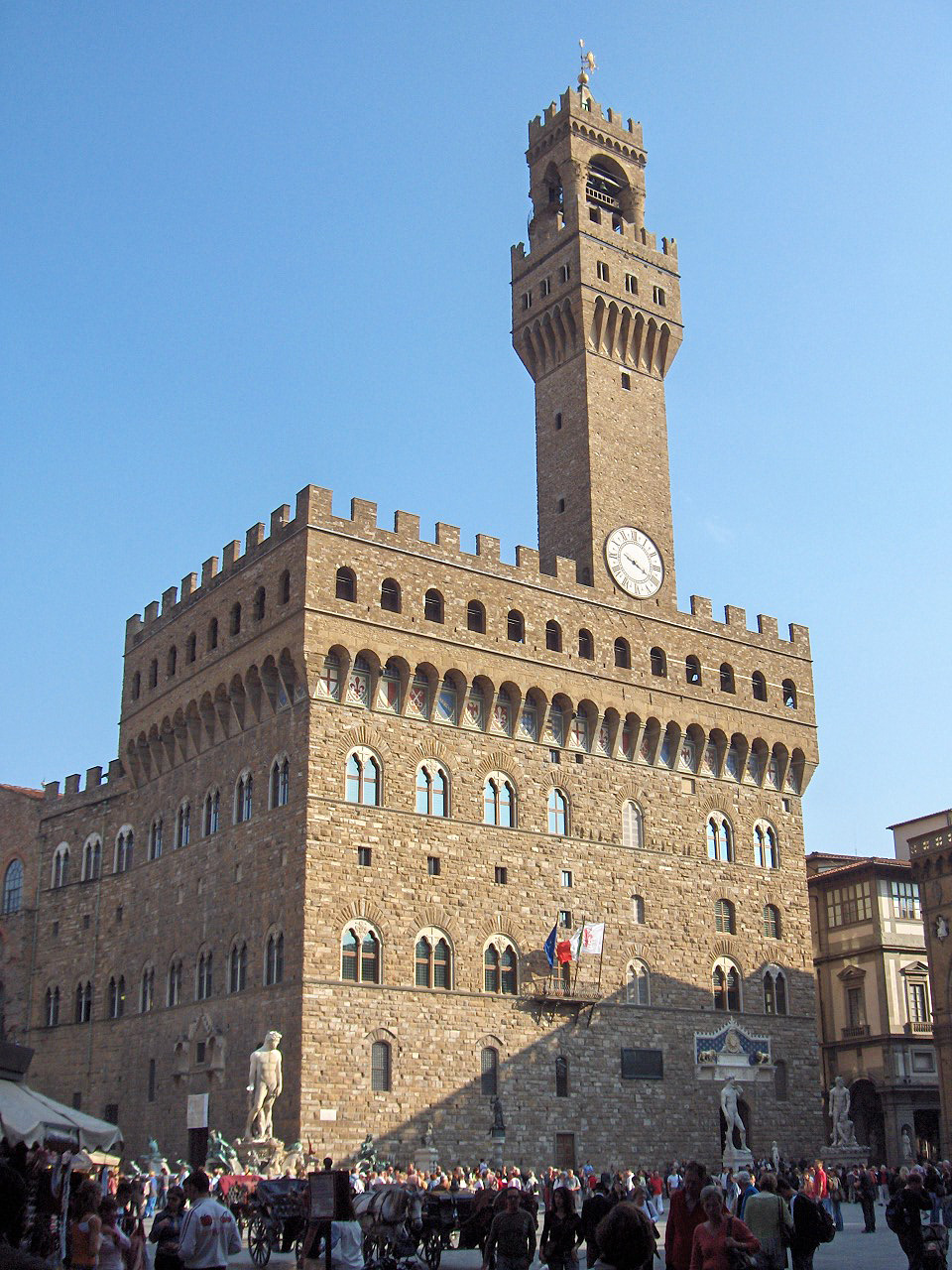
Palais des Papes in Avignon, France (left) and Palazzo Vecchio in Florence, Italy (right) are two examples of medieval palaces.

European palaces belonging to rulers were often large and grand, however, very few have survived to represent anything like their original medieval condition; many having been abandoned, burned down, demolished, or rebuilt. The Palais des Papes in Avignon, France, is probably the best prominent example, essentially a creation of 1252 to 1379, and little has changed since 1433, which marked the end of the Avignon Papacy and subsequent schisms.

Very little of the medieval Louvre Palace, one of the most magnificent, has survived above ground. Similar fates befell the main palaces of the Byzantine Empire in Constantinople: the Great Palace of Constantinople, Boukoleon Palace, and Palace of Blachernae. The Palace of the Porphyrogenitus, a part of the Palace of Blachernae, has significant remains and now houses a museum.

== Americas ==
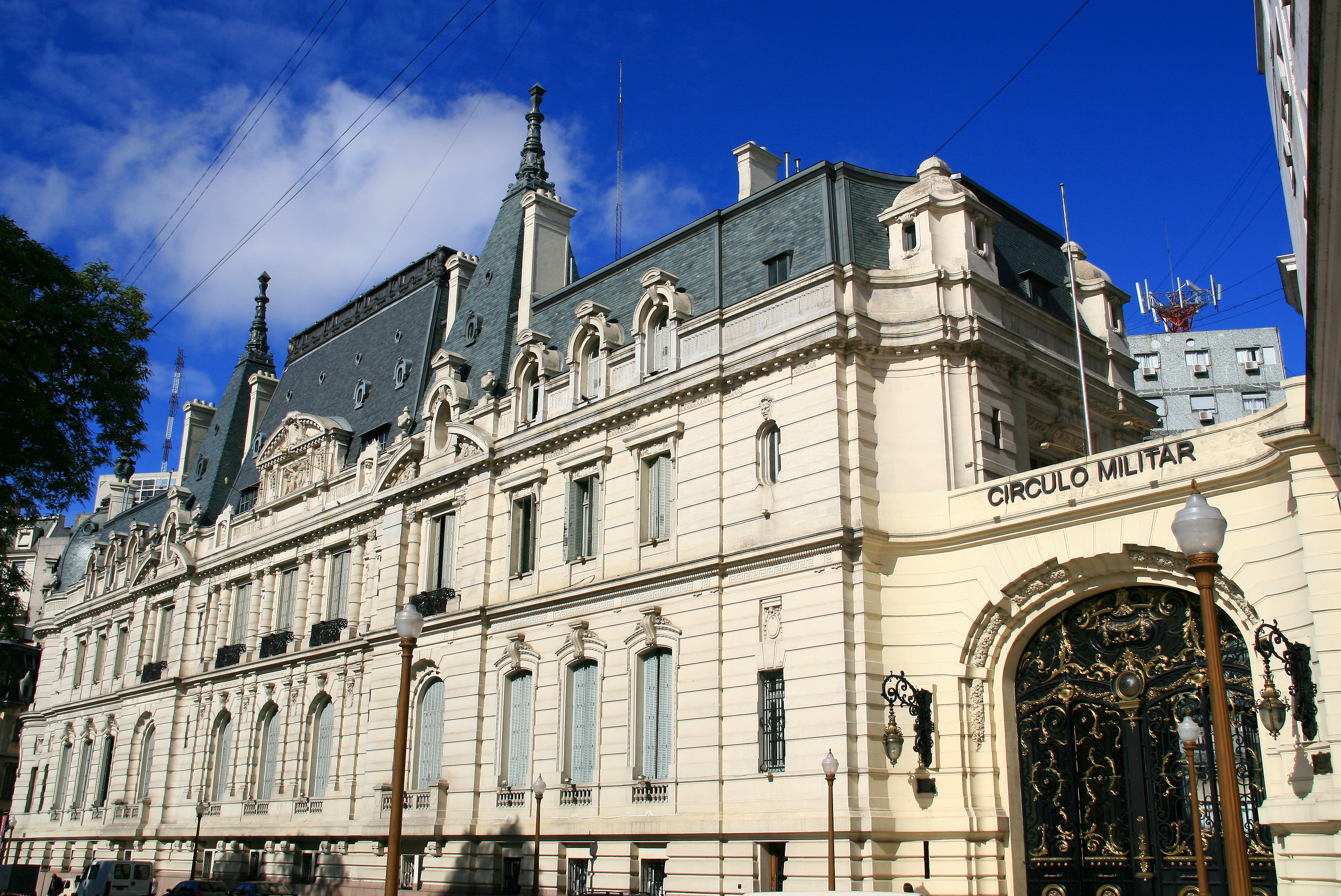
Palacio Paz in Buenos Aires, Argentina

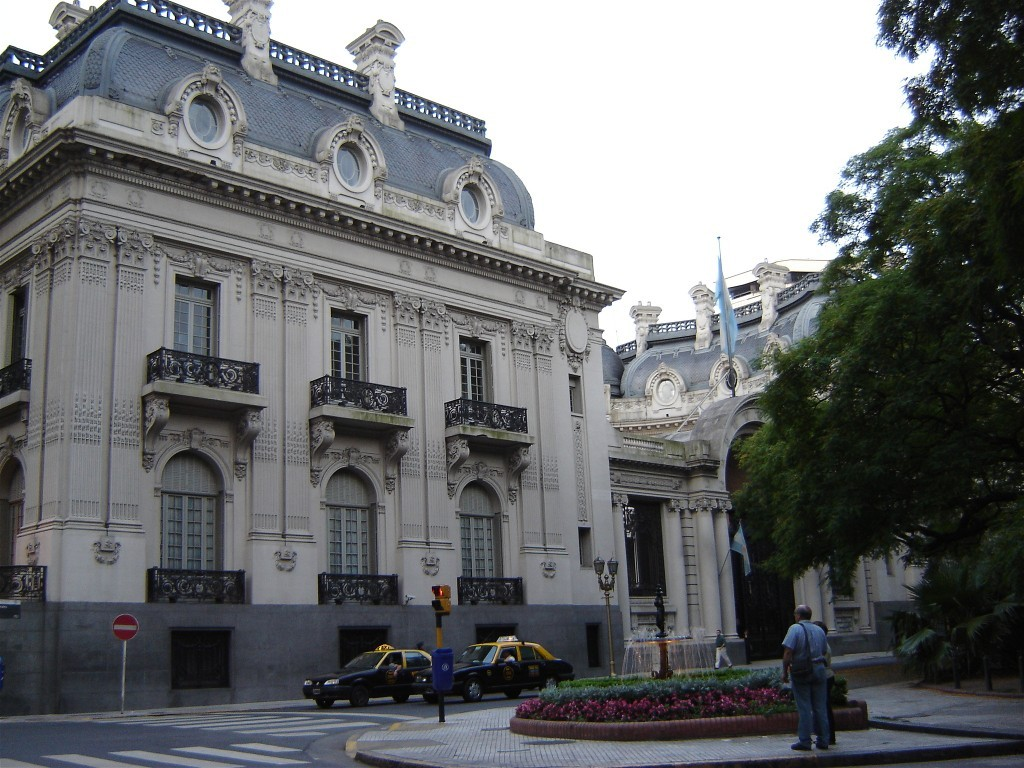
Palacio San Martín in Buenos Aires, Argentina

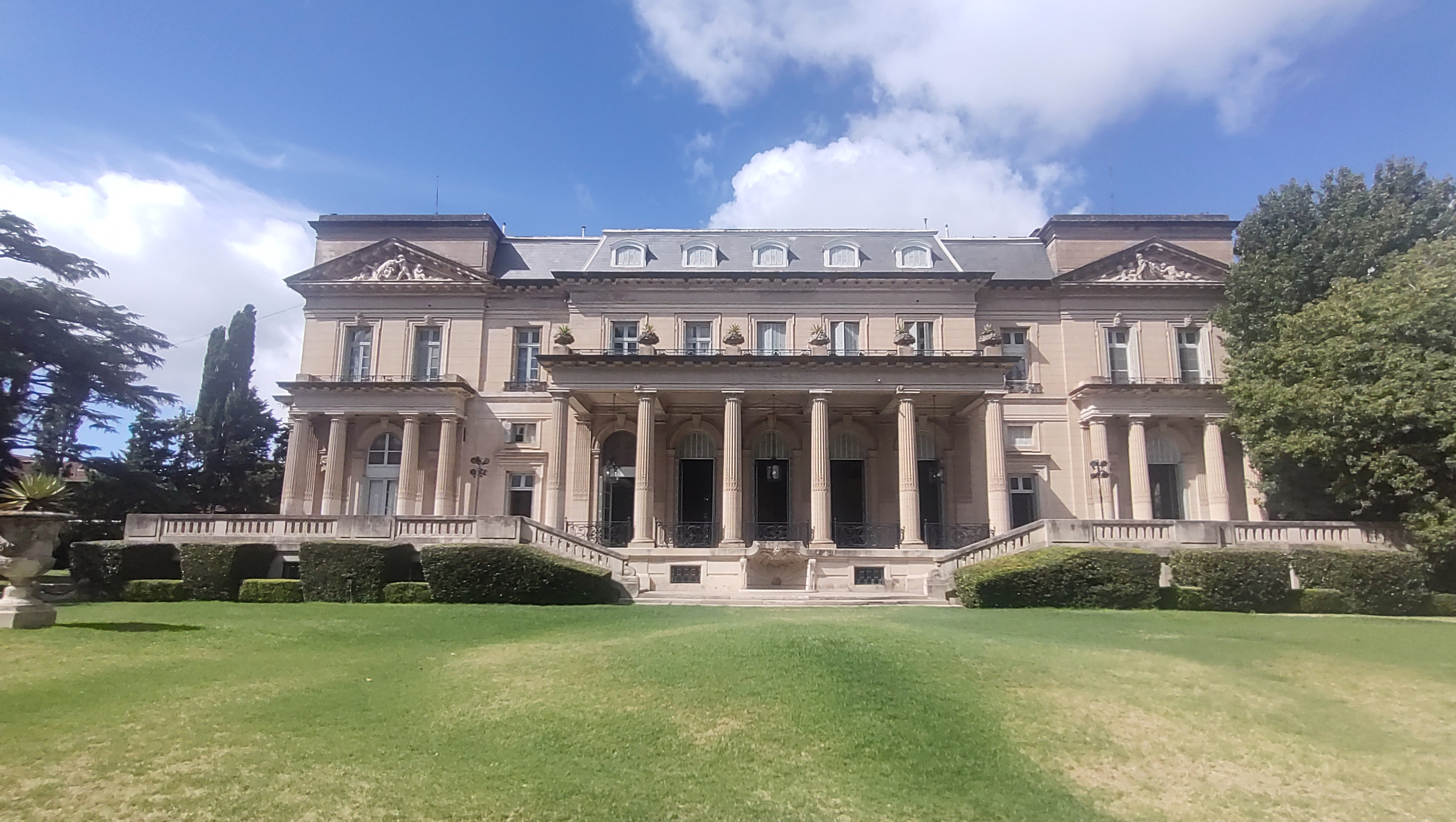
Palacio Sans Souci in San Fernando, Argentina

=== Argentina ===
All major cities in Argentina have prominent palaces due to the great economic growth the country went through in the late 19th century and early 20th century. In that time Argentina was one of the largest exporters of grain, meat, wool and leather in the world. The country's new elite was eager to show their wealth to the world, which is the reason they often hired European architects and in many cases, even imported all the construction materials needed. Some of those palaces are still residential and many others have become hotels, museums and embassies. Some examples of this are Palacio Duhau, Palacio Álzaga Unzué, Palacio Bosch, Palacio Paz and Palacio San Martín.

Also, President Domingo Faustino Sarmiento claimed that Argentine schools should be palaces because that would encourage children and teenagers to go to school. For that reason many public schools are opulent and are called "escuelas palacio". Some examples of this are Colegio Nacional de Buenos Aires, Colegio Nacional Rafael Hernández, Escuela Superior de Comercio Carlos Pellegrini, Colegio Mariano Moreno and Escuela Normal Sáenz Peña.

Other examples of government buildings in Argentina that are considered palaces are Palacio Pizzurno, Correo Central, Palacio de Aguas Corrientes and Palacio de Justicia de la Nación.

=== Brazil ===
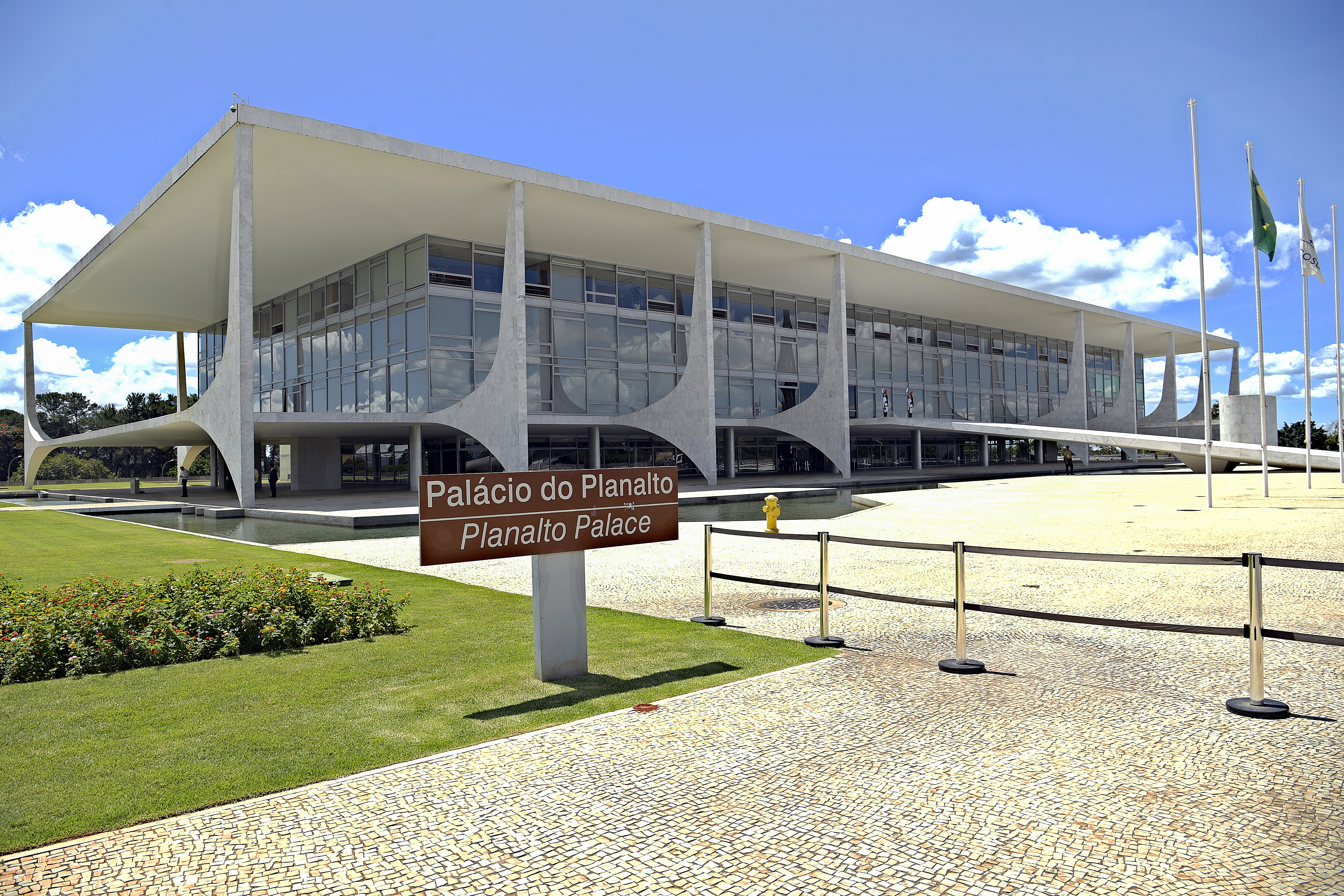
The Planalto Palace, in Brasília, Brazil

The Brazilian new capital, Brasília, hosts modern palaces, most designed by the city's architect Oscar Niemeyer. The Alvorada Palace is the official residence of Brazil's president. The Planalto Palace is the official workplace. The Jaburu Palace is the official residence of Brazil's vice-president. Also Rio de Janeiro, the former capital of the Portuguese Empire and the Empire of Brazil, houses numerous royal and imperial palaces as the Imperial Palace of São Cristóvão, former official residence of the Brazil's emperors, the Paço Imperial, its official workplace and the Guanabara Palace, former residence of Isabel, Princess Imperial of Brazil besides palaces of the nobility and aristocracy. The city of Petropolis, in the state of Rio de Janeiro, is mainly known for its palaces of the imperial period, such as the Petrópolis Palace and the Grão-Pará Palace.

=== Canada ===
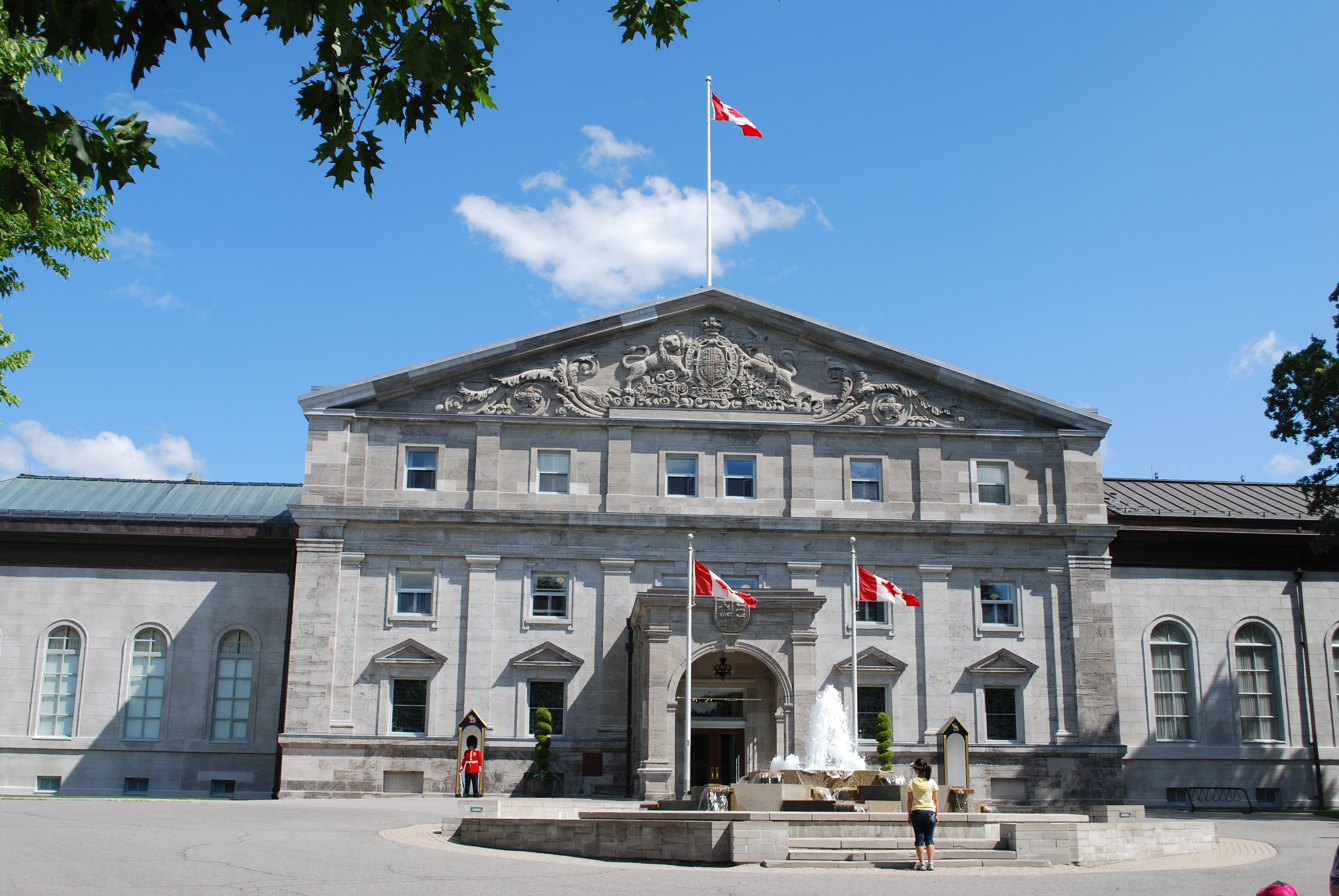
Rideau Hall is one of the official residences for the Canadian monarchy.

In Canada, Government House is a title given to the official residences of the Canadian monarchy and various viceroys (the governors general and the lieutenant governors). Though not universal, in most cases, the title is also the building's sole name; for example, the sovereign's and governor general's principal residence in Ottawa is known as Government House only in formal contexts, being more generally referred to as Rideau Hall. Government House is an inherited custom from the British Empire, where there were and are many government houses.

Rideau Hall is, since 1867, the official residence in Ottawa of both the Canadian monarch and his or her representative, the governor general of Canada, and has been described as "Canada's house". It stands in Canada's capital on a 36-hectare (89-acre) estate at 1 Sussex Drive, with the main building consisting of approximately 175 rooms across 9,500 m^{2} (102,000 sq ft), and 27 outbuildings around the grounds. While the equivalent structure in many countries has a prominent, central place in the national capital, Rideau Hall's site is relatively unobtrusive within Ottawa, giving it more of the character of a private home.

Along with Rideau Hall, the Citadelle of Quebec, also known as La Citadelle, is an active military installation and official residence of the Canadian monarch and the governor general. It is located atop Cap Diamant, adjoining the Plains of Abraham in Quebec City, Quebec. The citadel is the oldest military building in Canada and forms part of the fortifications of Quebec City, which is one of only two cities in North America still surrounded by fortifications. The fortress is located within the historic district of Old Québec, designated a World Heritage Site in 1985.

In addition to the federal residences, most provinces maintain a place for the Canadian monarch and their provincial viceroys and lieutenant governors. There is no government house for the lieutenant governors of Ontario (repurposed in 1937 and demolished in 1961), Quebec (destroyed by fire in 1966), or Alberta (closed in 1938 and repurchased and repurposed in 1964).

=== Mexico ===
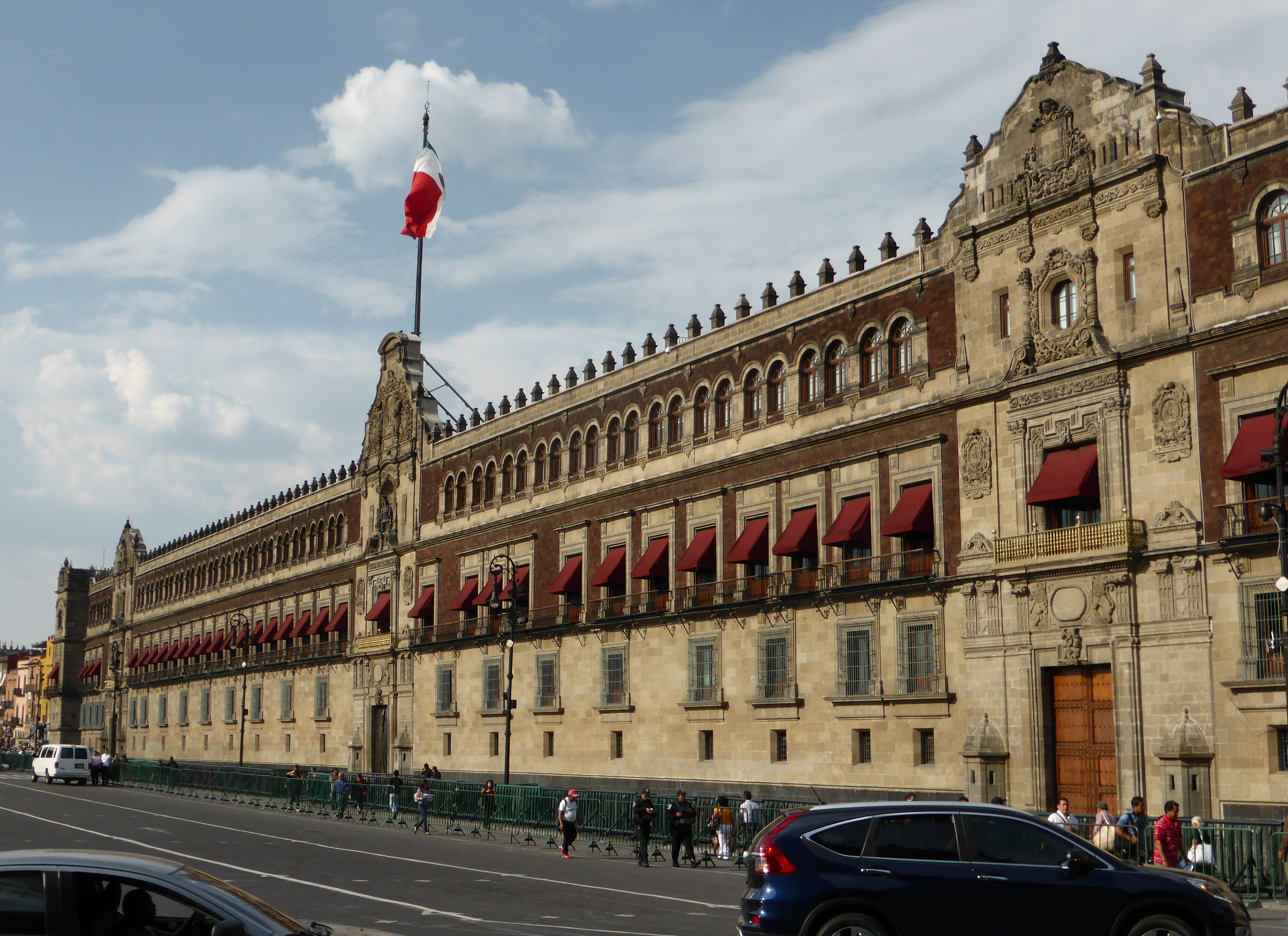
The Palacio Nacional, or National Palace in Mexico City, built as the residence of the viceroys of New Spain in 1563

The capital of Mexico, Mexico City, is traditionally nicknamed the "City of Palaces"; a nickname usually attributed to Alexander von Humboldt after he visited the city in the late 18th century and early 19th century, but initially coined by Charles Latrobe, an English traveler who visited Mexico City in 1834 and "got the feeling of living a dream".

In Central Mexico, the Aztec emperors built many palaces in the capital of their empire, Tenochtitlan (modern-day Mexico City), some of which may still be seen. On observing the great city Hernán Cortés wrote, "There are, in all districts of this great city, many temples or palaces... They are all magnificent buildings. Amongst these temples is one, the principal one, whose great size and magnificence no human tongue could describe,... All around this wall are exquisite quarters with huge rooms and corridors. There are as many as forty towers, all of which are so high that in the case of the largest, there are fifty steps leading up to the main part of it, and the most important of these towers is higher than that of the cathedral of Seville..."

In the Yucatan, a well-preserved Mayan palace with a unique four-storey observation tower stands at the Palenque site, from where Pakal reigned over the city-state.

The National Palace, or Palacio Nacional, located in Mexico City's main square, the Plaza de la Constitución (El Zócalo), first built in 1563, is in the heart of the Mexican capital. In 1821, the palace was given its current name, and the executive, legislative, and judicial branches of government were housed in the palace; the latter two branches would eventually reside elsewhere. During the Second Mexican Empire, its name was changed, for a time, to the Imperial Palace. The National Palace continues to be the official seat of the executive authority, though it is no longer the president's official residence.

Also in Mexico City is the Castillo de Chapultepec, or Chapultepec Castle, located in the middle of Chapultepec Park, which currently houses the Mexican National Museum of History. It is the only castle, or palace, in North America that was occupied by sovereigns – Emperor Maximilian I of Mexico, a member of the House of Habsburg and his consort, Empress Carlota of Mexico, daughter of Leopold I of Belgium. The palace features many objets d'art ranging from gifts of Napoleon III to paintings by Franz Xaver Winterhalter and Mexican painter Santiago Rebull.

=== United States ===
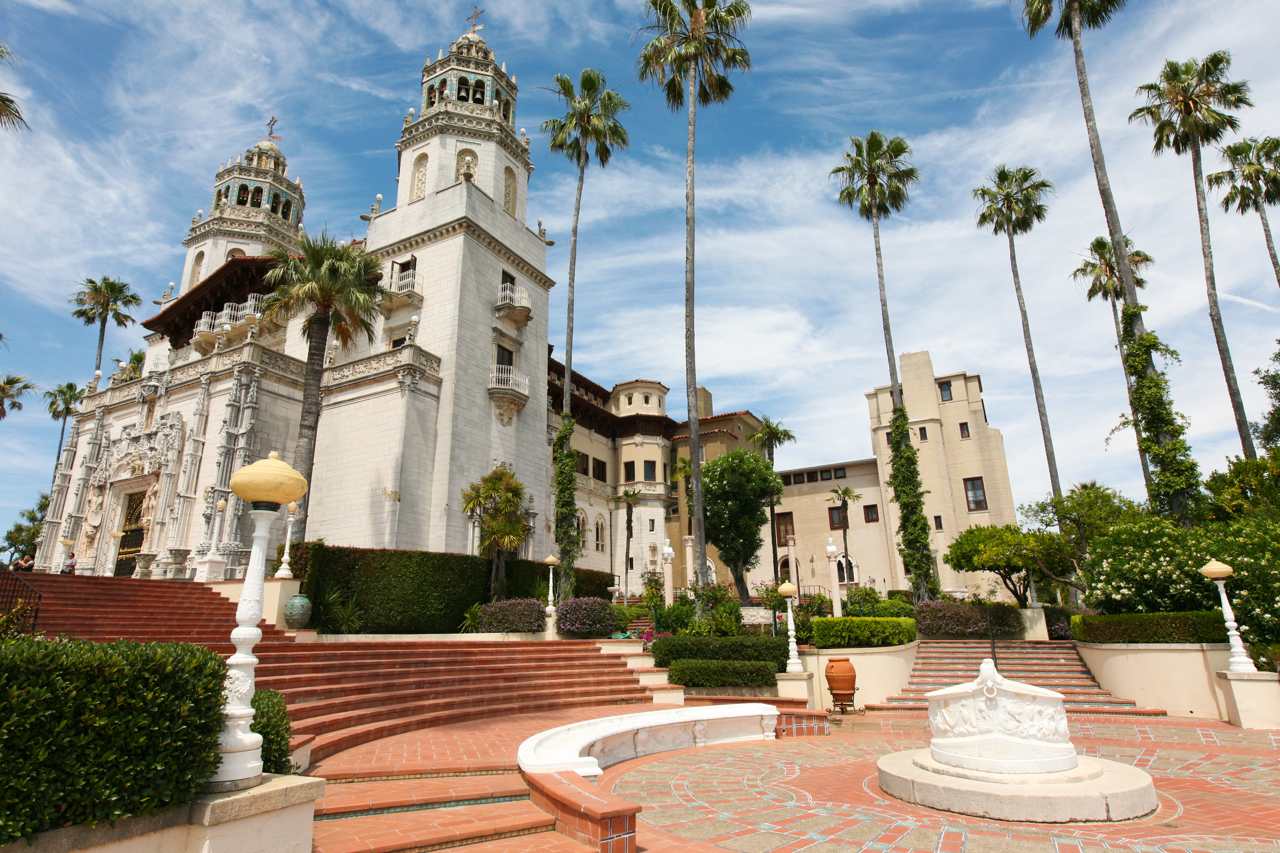
Hearst Castle in California

Palaces in the United States include the White House, the official residence of the president, and the official residences of many governors and Roman Catholic bishops. Some palaces of former heads of state or their representatives, such as English and Spanish royal governors and the Hawaiian royal family, still exist.

Examples include: ʻIolani Palace and Hānaiakamalama, the former homes of the Hawaiian monarchs in Honolulu; Hulihee Palace in Kailua-Kona, Hawaii; The Governor's Palace in Williamsburg, a modern reconstruction of the official residence of the royal governors of the Colony of Virginia; Tryon Palace in New Bern, a modern reconstruction of the historical colonial governors' palace of the Province of North Carolina; and the Palace of the Governors in Santa Fe, New Mexico as well as the Spanish Governor's Palace in San Antonio, Texas, which were residences of both Spanish and Mexican governors.

There are many private buildings or mansions in the United States, which, though not called "palaces", have the grandeur typical of a palace, and have been used as residences. Hearst Castle and the Biltmore Estate are examples.

=== Uruguay ===
The Palacio Legislativo (Legislative Palace) is the house of the Uruguayan Parliament.

=== Venezuela ===
The Palacio de Miraflores is the setting for the offices of the president of the country.

== Africa ==
=== Ethiopia ===
Located in Addis Ababa, the Menelik Palace is a palatial compound that is currently serving as the residence of the prime minister of Ethiopia. The compound, while containing palaces and residences also contains a few churches, tombs and monasteries. Previously, it served as the seat of the emperors of Ethiopia. After a 2018 renovation, the compound opened to the public in 2019 as a part of Unity Park.

=== Nigeria ===
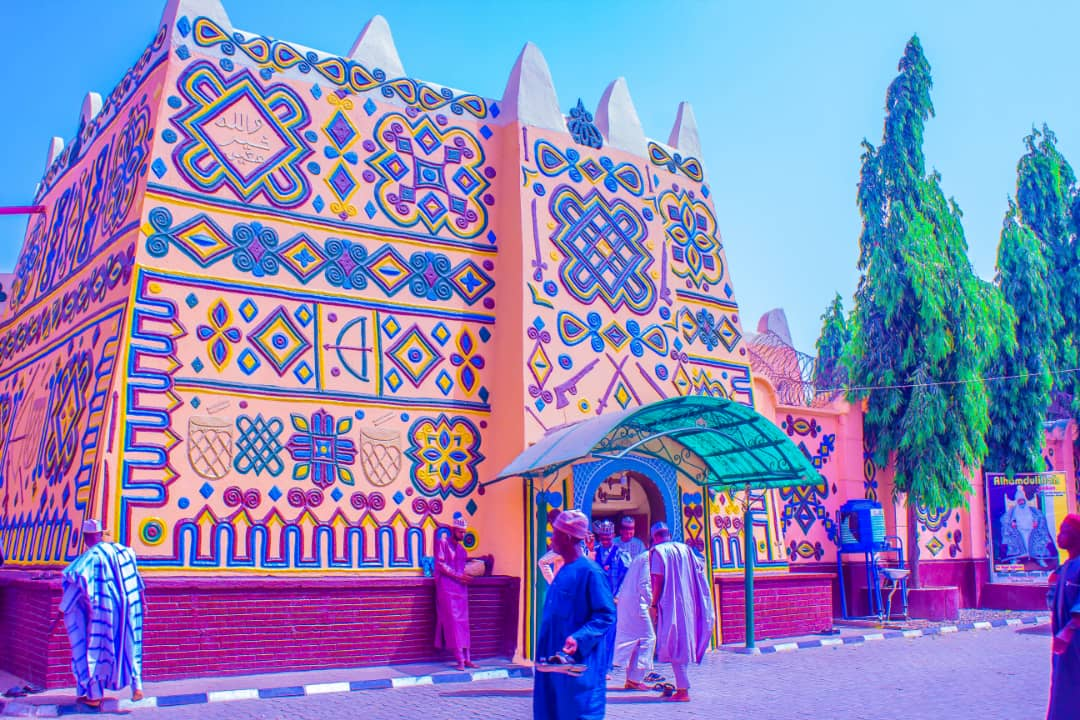
The emir's palace of the Bauchi Emirate, Nigeria

The Palace of the Olowo, ruler of the Yoruba Owo clan of Nigeria, is acknowledged to be the largest palace in all of Africa. It consists of more than 100 courtyards, each with a unique traditional usage.

In the Kano State of Nigeria, the Gidan Rumfa acts as the seat of the Emir of Kano since the late 15th century when it was constructed.

In Benin City, the capital of the Edo State, lies the current Royal Palace of the Oba of Benin. It currently houses the Oba of Benin, who is the traditional ruler of the Edo people, alongside some other royals. The current palace is a reconstruction by Eweka II after the original was destroyed in 1897 by the British.

=== Rwanda ===
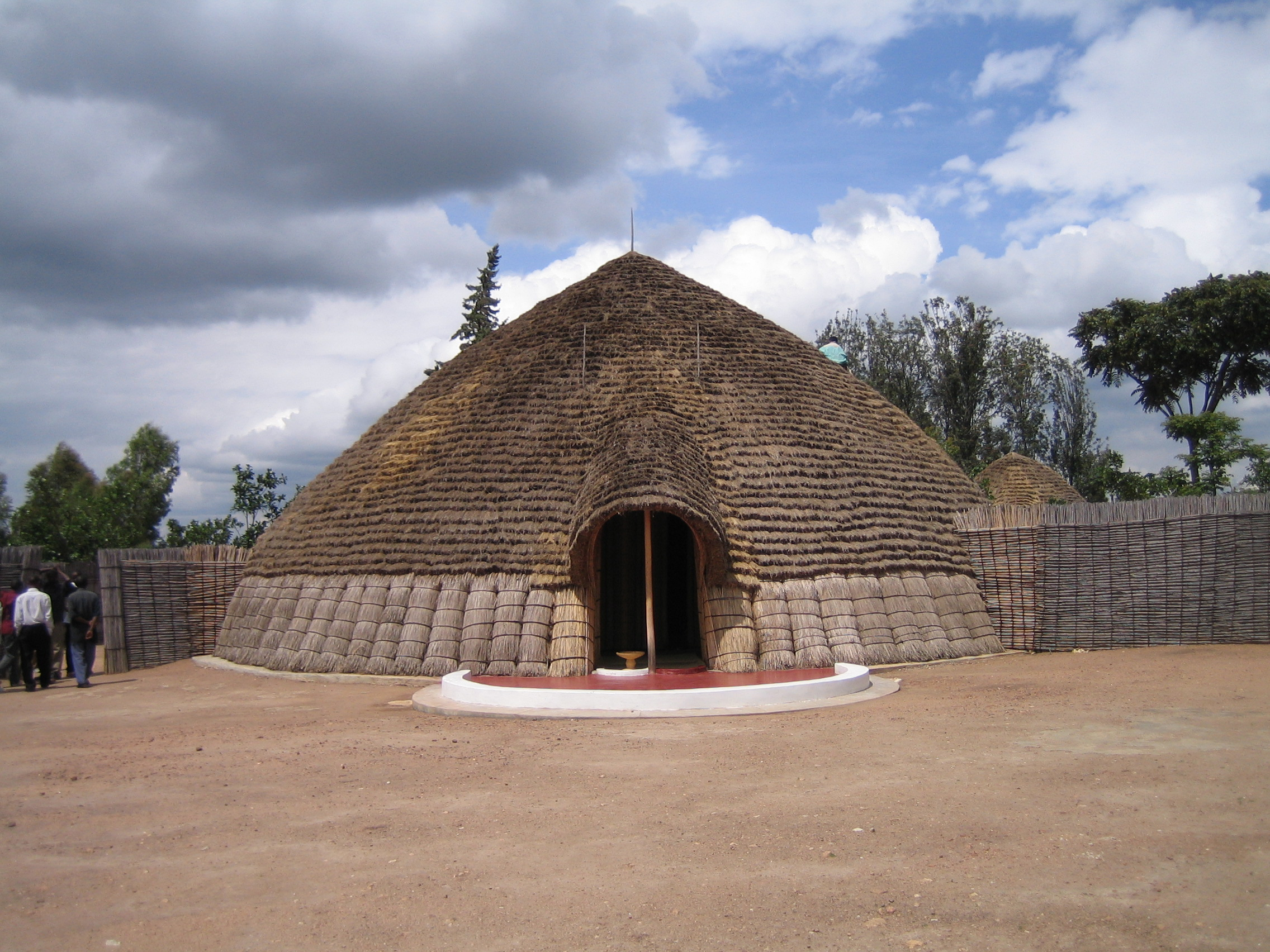
The original King's Palace of Nyanza, Rwanda

Rwanda is host to three palaces, although one of them is currently repurposed. In Nyanza, the former royal capital of the Kingdom of Rwanda, are two existing palaces. The first, the traditional King's Palace, is constructed in the vernacular style and housed the traditional ruler of Rwanda, the Mwami. A second palace for the king exists in Nyanza, although it is constructed in the Art Deco style as opposed to the local construction style. A third palace, the Rwesero Palace, was originally constructed for Mutara III, but he died before its completion, and the building was converted into the Rwesero Art Museum.

=== Uganda ===
The Kabakas Palace belonged to the Kingdom of Buganda and is a known landmark of the present capital Kampala.

== Asia ==
=== Afghanistan ===
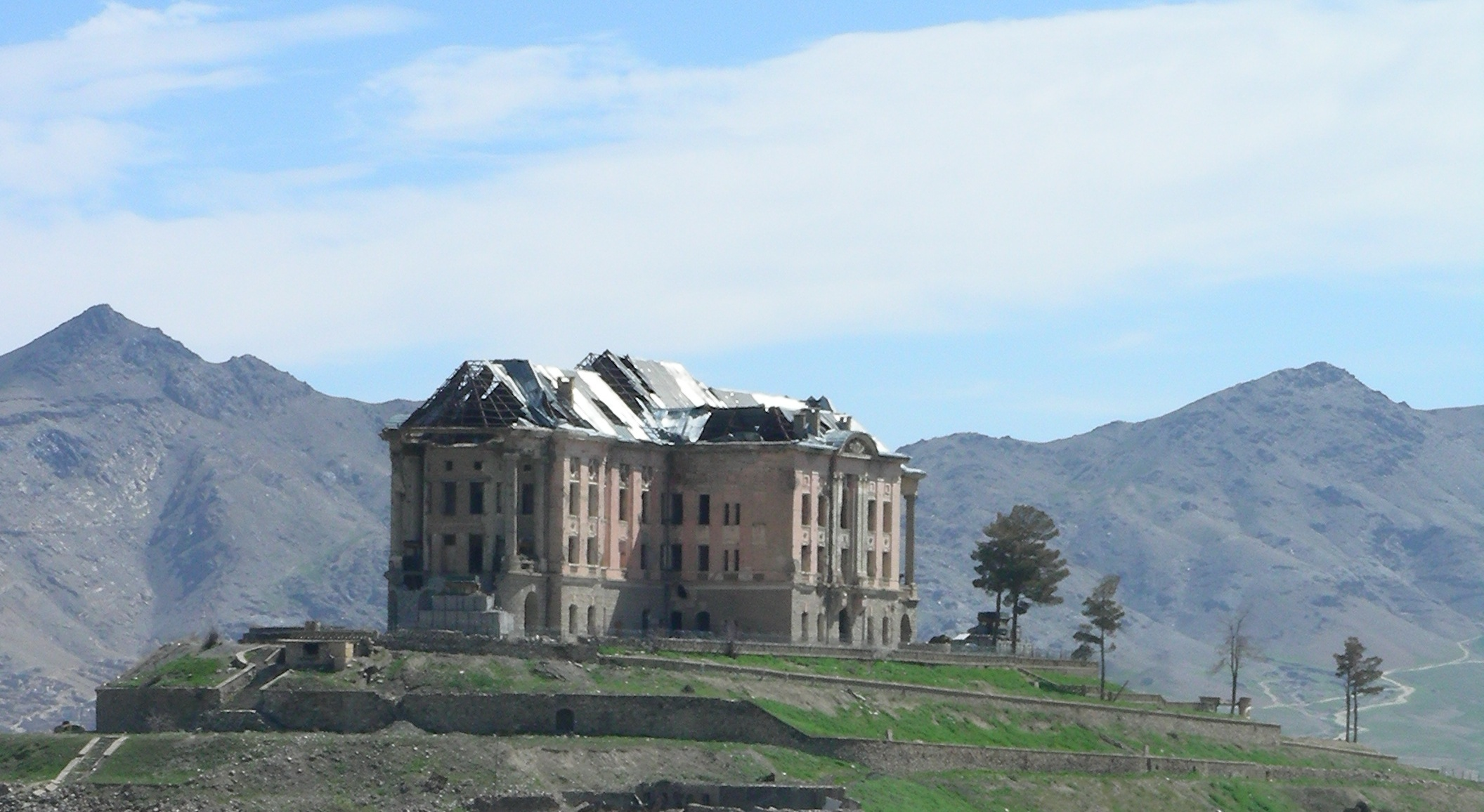
The ruined Tajbeg Palace in Kabul, restored in 2021

Afghanistan's capital Kabul is well known for its sheer number of palaces. Many had been built in the 19th century but perhaps the most famous is the Darul Aman Palace. Many palaces were damaged by the civil war, including Darul Aman, but others have survived or have been rebuilt.

=== Armenia ===
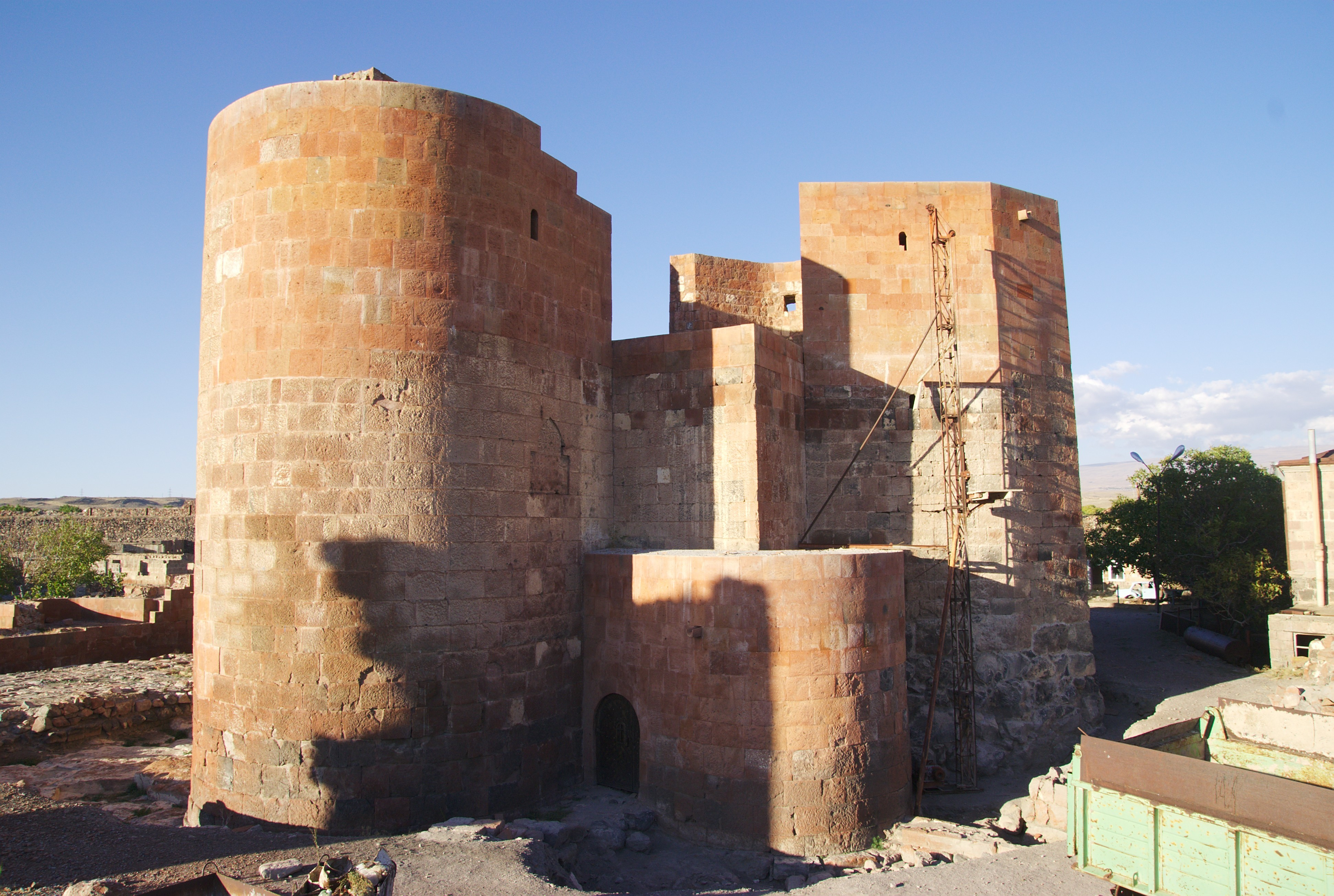
Dashtadem Palace

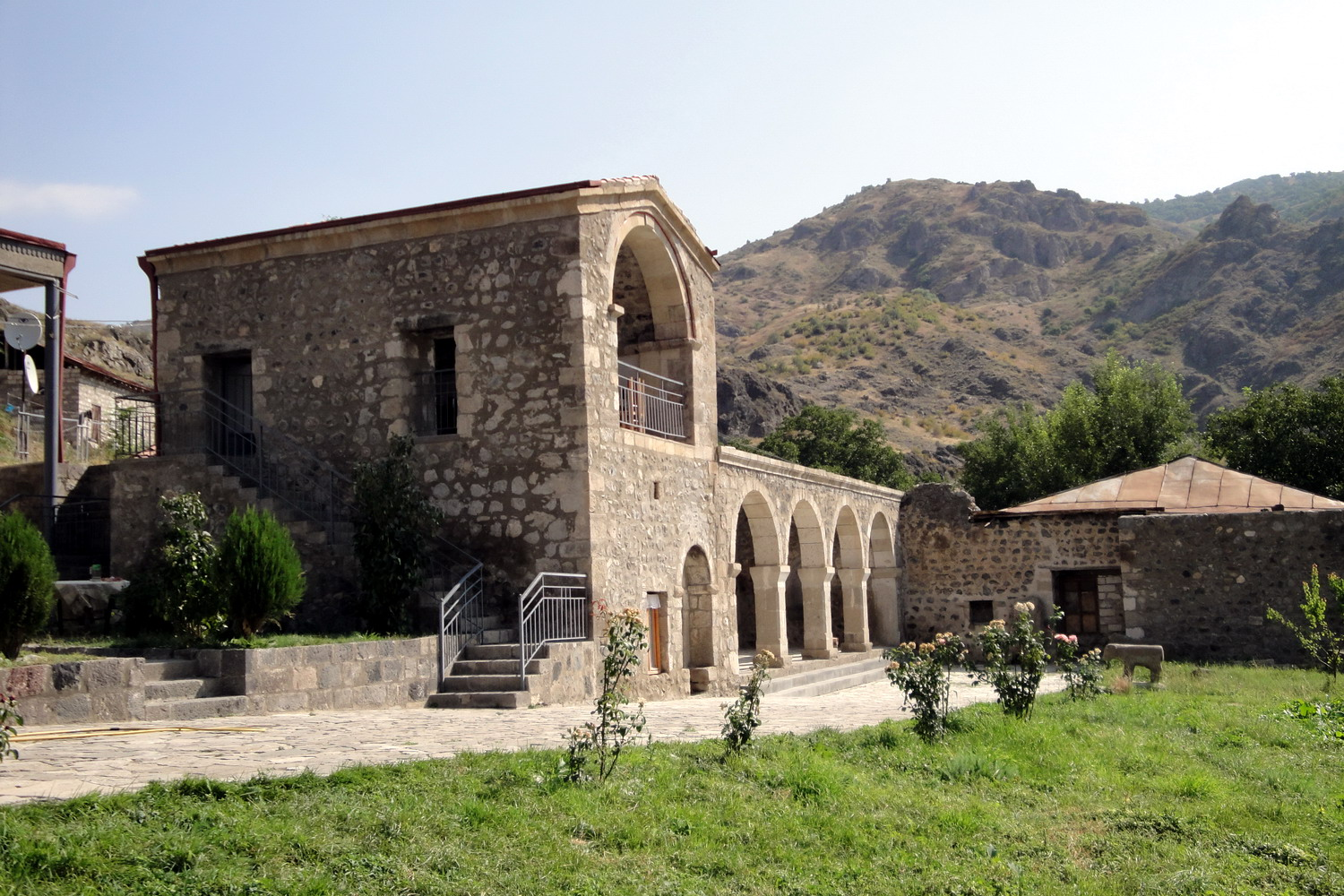
The Palace of Armenian Melik Haykazyan

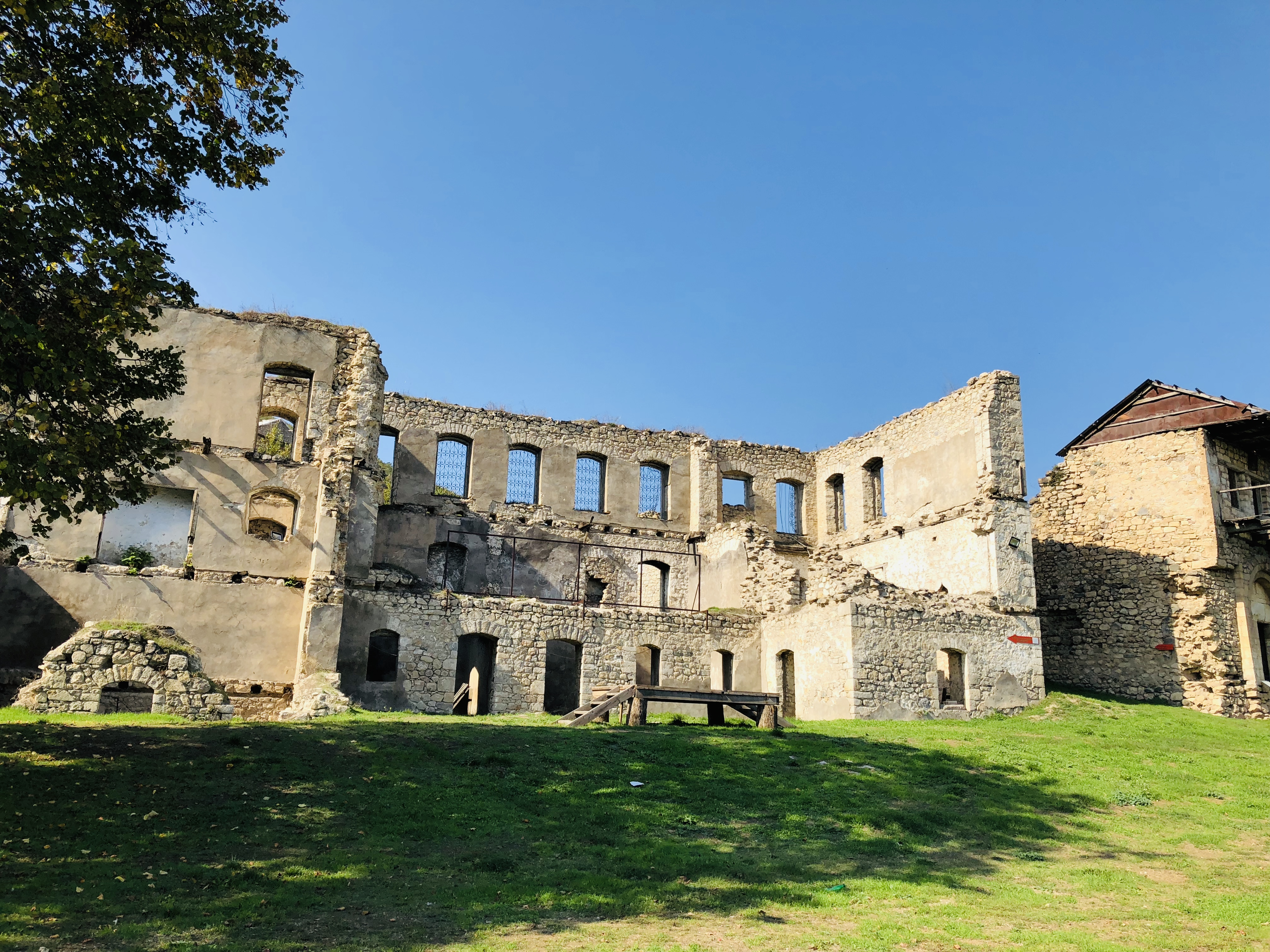
Palace of Dizak Meliks

Examples of Armenian palaces

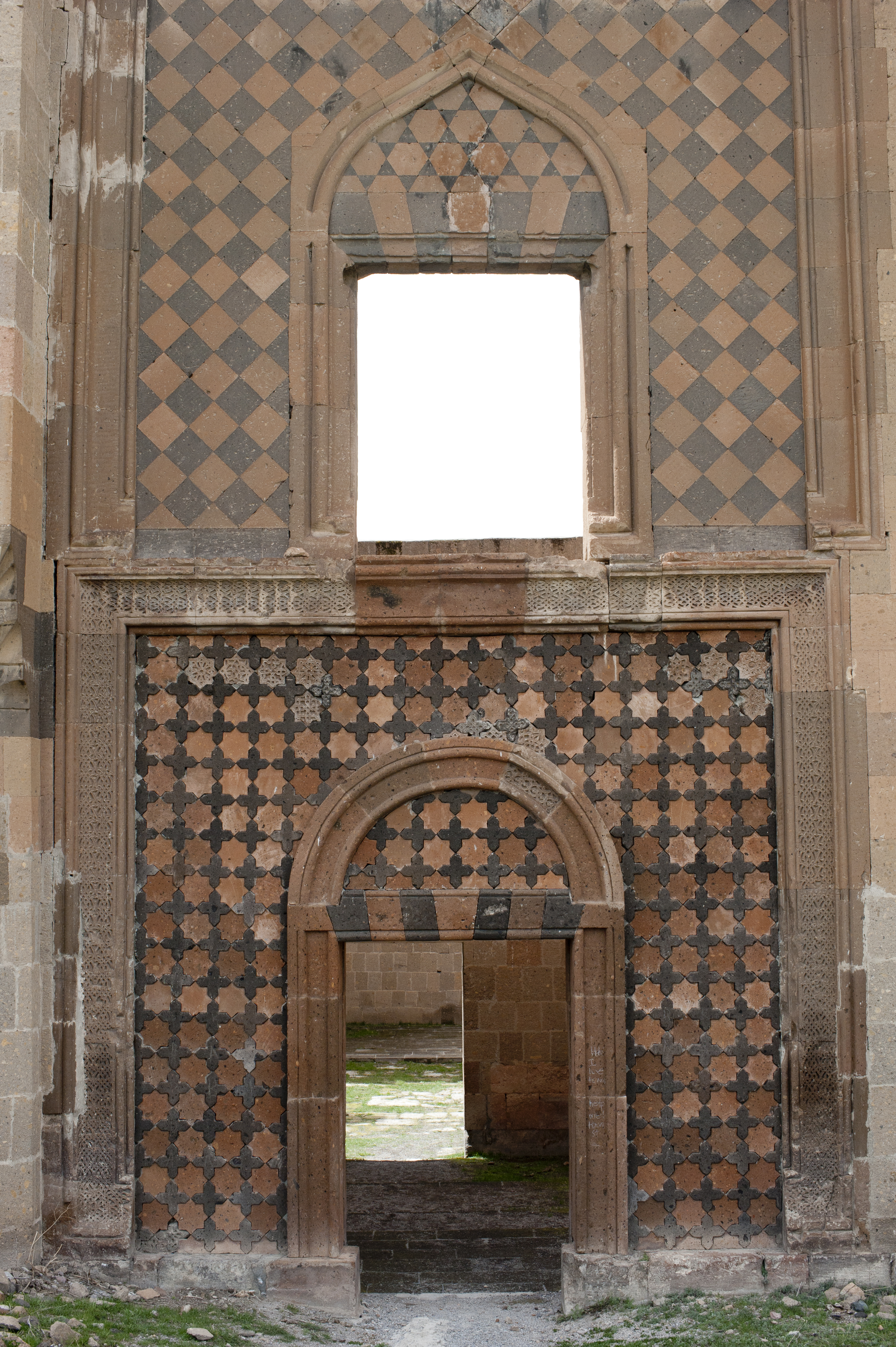
Tigran Honents Palace in Ani

Armenia has many palaces from its various historical periods. The Erebuni fortress in Yerevan has a grand royal palace constructed in 782 B.C. by King Argisthi. The palace at Erebuni is one of the earliest examples of an Urartian palace.

During the Kingdom of Armenia (antiquity), many palaces were constructed for the successive kings. Ruins of a royal palace can be found in the early Armenian capital of Yervandashat, which was built to serve as the seat of Orontid Armenian Kings by Orontes IV. During the period of the Artaxiad dynasty of Armenia, emperor king Tigranes the great constructed a grand persianate palace in the newly built city of Tigranocerta. The purpose of the Armenian Temple of Garni is still up for debate, however, certain scholars attest that following the Christianization of Armenia in the 4th century BC, the temple was converted into a summer palace for Khosrovidukht (sister of Tiridates III of Armenia) by the Arsacid dynasty of Armenia.

After the fall of the Arsacids, Armenia was ruled by a succession of aristocratic families who held the title Nakharar. One of these Nakharar princes, Grigor Mamikonian, built a palace in the citadel of Aruch near the Aruchavank cathedral; some walls of this palace and a unique Armenian throne made of tufa still survive today.

The medieval capital of the Bagratid kingdom of Armenia, Ani, also hosted many palaces. The first palace of Ani, constructed by the princely Armenian Kamsarakan dynasty in the seventh century, served as the most important structure of the city. Located in the main citadel, the Kamsarakan palace was used by the successive Bagratid kingdom as their headquarters. In addition, Ani hosted several other palaces such as the Merchant's(Tigran Honents) Palace, one of the best surviving examples of secular Armenian architecture of that time, the Seljuk palace, and the Manuchir Mosque, which is said by some historians to have been a residence of Bagratid kings before being converted to a mosque.

After the Bagratid state was conquered by the Byzantines and then the Seljuks, Armenia was once again liberated by the royal Zakarian family under Georgian Queen Tamar. This period of Zakarid Armenia brought forth many palaces as well, the most notable of which being Amberd Fortress and the 12th-century palace in Dashtadem Fortress. The Zakarids became vassals of the Mongols, however, following their collapse, a succession of nomadic Turkic empires came to rule the region.

During the various periods of Ottoman and Iranian occupation following the Timurid Empire, Armenia was governed by several local principalities known as Melikdoms. Each Melik had their own princely palace. The most notable of which is the Palace of the Dizak Melikdom constructed by Melik Yeganyan in Togh (1737). Other notable melik palaces are the Melik Ahnazar palace in Khnatsakh (16th century), the Melik Haykaz Palace in Melikashen (15th century), the Melik Kasu palace, the palace of the Melik-Barkhudaryans in Tegh (1783) and Halidzor Fortress (17th century), which served as a palace for the Melik Parsadanian family.

=== Azerbaijan ===
Gulustan Palace, Baku

The palaces of the president of Azerbaijan

The Government House in Baku

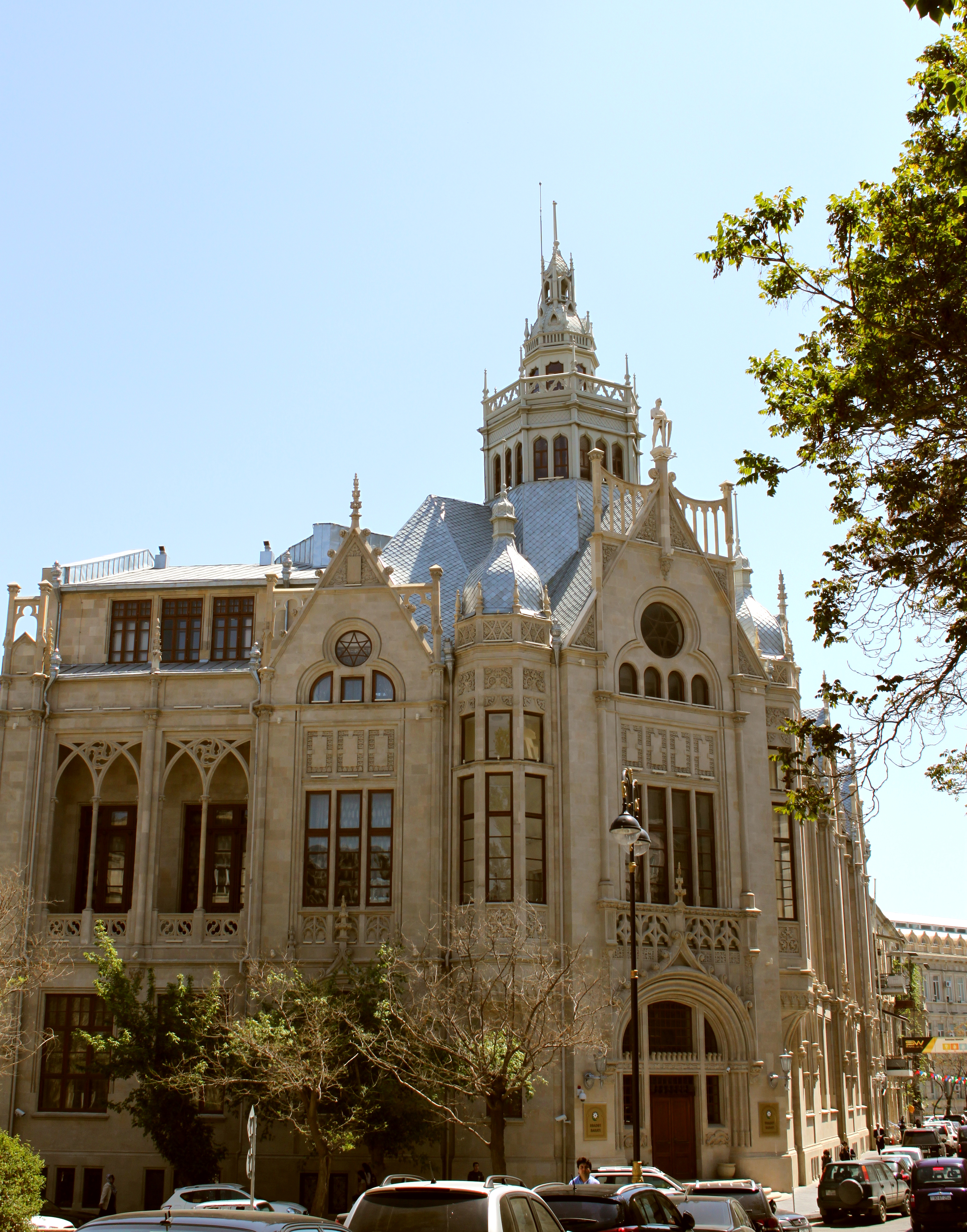
Palace of Happiness in Baku

Azerbaijan has a number of palaces which belong to different ages. For example, there are palaces from the BC era and from the 12th century, like the "Goyalp" Palace of Eldiguzids Empire Atabeg— located in Nakhchivan city and built in the 1130s.

Baku Khans' Palace is a complex of several houses that belonged to members of ruling family of the Baku Khanate in the 17th century. The palace complex was in ruins but has now been reconstructed as of 2018. Official Administration of State Historical-Architectural Reserve Icheri Sheher has opened the complex as a palace-museum.

The Palace of Happiness (Azerbaijani: Səadət Sarayı), currently also called Palace of Marriage Registrations and previously called Mukhtarov Palace, is a historic building in the center of Baku, Azerbaijan, built in Neo-Gothic style in the early 19th century.

Shahbulag Castle Palace (Azerbaijani: Şahbulaq qalası "Spring of the Shah") is an 18th-century fortress near Aghdam. After the death of Turkic ruler Nadir Shah, the territory that is today Azerbaijan split into several Caucasian khanates, one of which was the Karabakh Khanate founded by Panah Ali Khan. The first residence of Panah Ali Khan was the Bayat Castle, built in 1748.

Haji Gayib's Palace is an ancient fortress construction near a coastal side of Icheri Sheher. It is located in the Baku quarter of Icheri Sheher, opposite the Maiden Tower. The history of the palace dates back to the 15th century. The Intake portal of the bathhouse is rectangular shaped

The Palace of Shaki Khans (Azerbaijani: Şəki xanlarının sarayı) in Shaki, Azerbaijan, was a summer residence of Shaki Khans. It was built in 1797 by Muhammed Hasan Khan. Along with its pool and plane trees, the summer residence is the only remaining structure from the larger palatial complex inside the Sheki Khans' Fortress, which once included a winter palace, residences for the khan's family and servants' quarters. It features decorative tiles, fountains and several stained-glass windows. The exterior was decorated with dark blue, turquoise and ochre tiles in geometric patterns and the murals were coloured with tempera and were inspired by the works of Nizami Ganjavi.

These are located in various regions and capital of Azerbaijan – the palace of government:

- Residence of Zagulba (510s) is the world's oldest presidential house and full-time residence of the president of Azerbaijan in Baku.
- Bika Khanum Saray (1390–1394) Full-time residence of the president of Azerbaijan in Baku.
- Bullur Palace (1740) residence of the president of Azerbaijan, and chairmen of the Supreme Majlis of Nakhchivan Autonomous Republic in Sharur District.
- Asena Palace (1804) Full-time residence of the president of Azerbaijan in Baku.
- Göy Saray (Blue) (1810s) Rest residence of the president of Azerbaijan in Baku
- Palace of White Horse (1933) was the old rest palace for members of Political Bureau in Shamkir
- Government House (1936) is a government building palace housing various state ministries of Azerbaijan
- Administrational Palace (1970s)
- Gulustan Palace (1973) Full-time and feast residence of the president of Azerbaijan in Baku.
- Ghazan Khan Palace (2006) Residence of the president of Azerbaijan in Baku.
- Vahdat Presidential Summer Palace (2007) in Shamakhi
- Presidential Mountain Palace (2013) Rest residence of the president of Azerbaijan in Qabala

=== Brunei ===
Istana Nurul Iman is the world's largest residential palace and is the official residence of the sultan of Brunei, Hassanal Bolkiah, and the seat of the Brunei government. The palace is located on a leafy sprawl of hills on the banks of the Brunei River, a few kilometres south of Bandar Seri Begawan, Brunei's capital.

=== Bangladesh ===
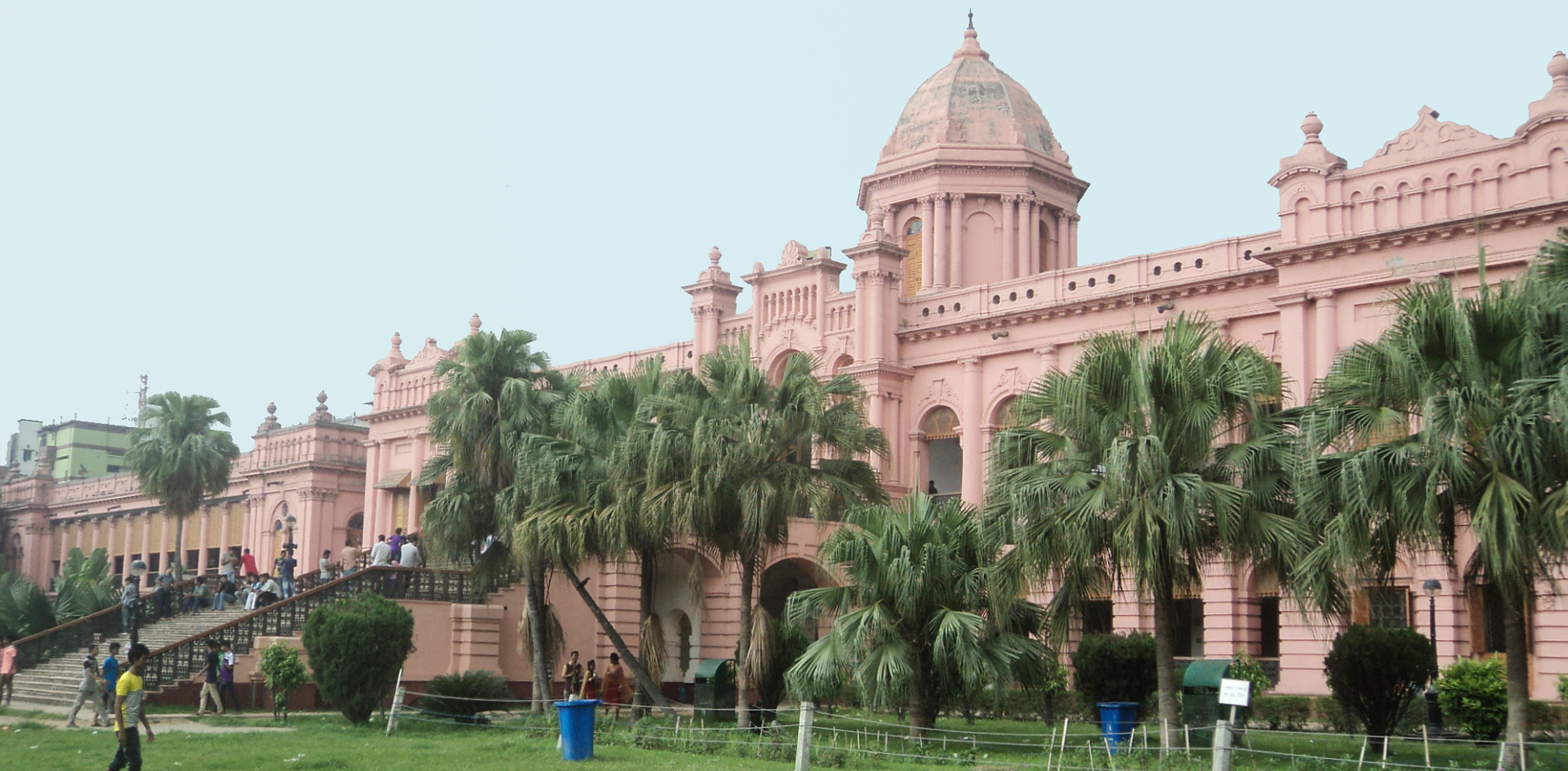
Ahsan Manzil, Dhaka

Most of the palaces in Bangladesh were built by the Zamindars and Nawabs of British Bengal. Many magnificent palaces can be found across the country. Among the notable palaces are Ahsan Manzil (also known as Pink Palace), built by the Nawabs of Dhaka; Tajhat Palace of Rangpur; Natore Palace; Puthia Rajbari of Rajshahi; Rose Garden Palace of Old Dhaka; Baliati Palace of Manikganj; Shashi Lodge of Mymensingh; and Bangabhaban (Presidential Palace).

=== China ===
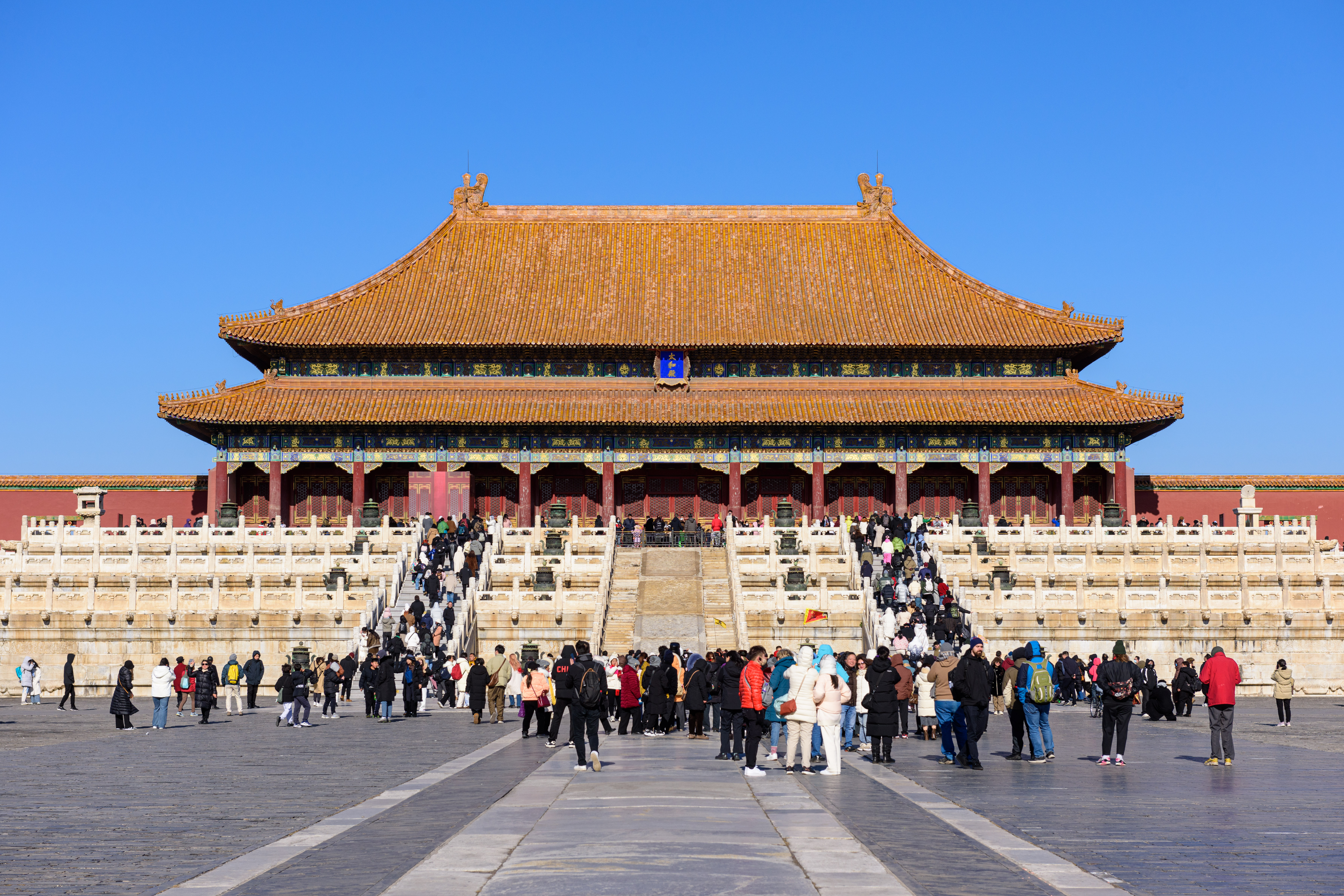
The Hall of Supreme Harmony in Beijing, China

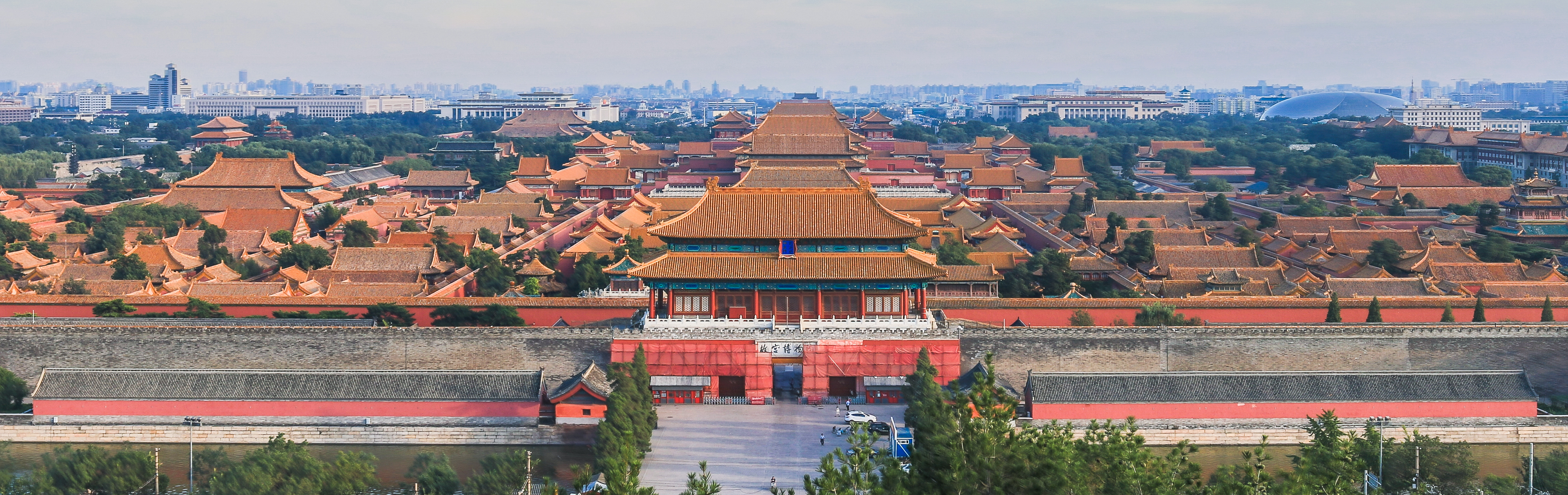
The Forbidden City took form as a grand complex of pavilions enclosed within square walls

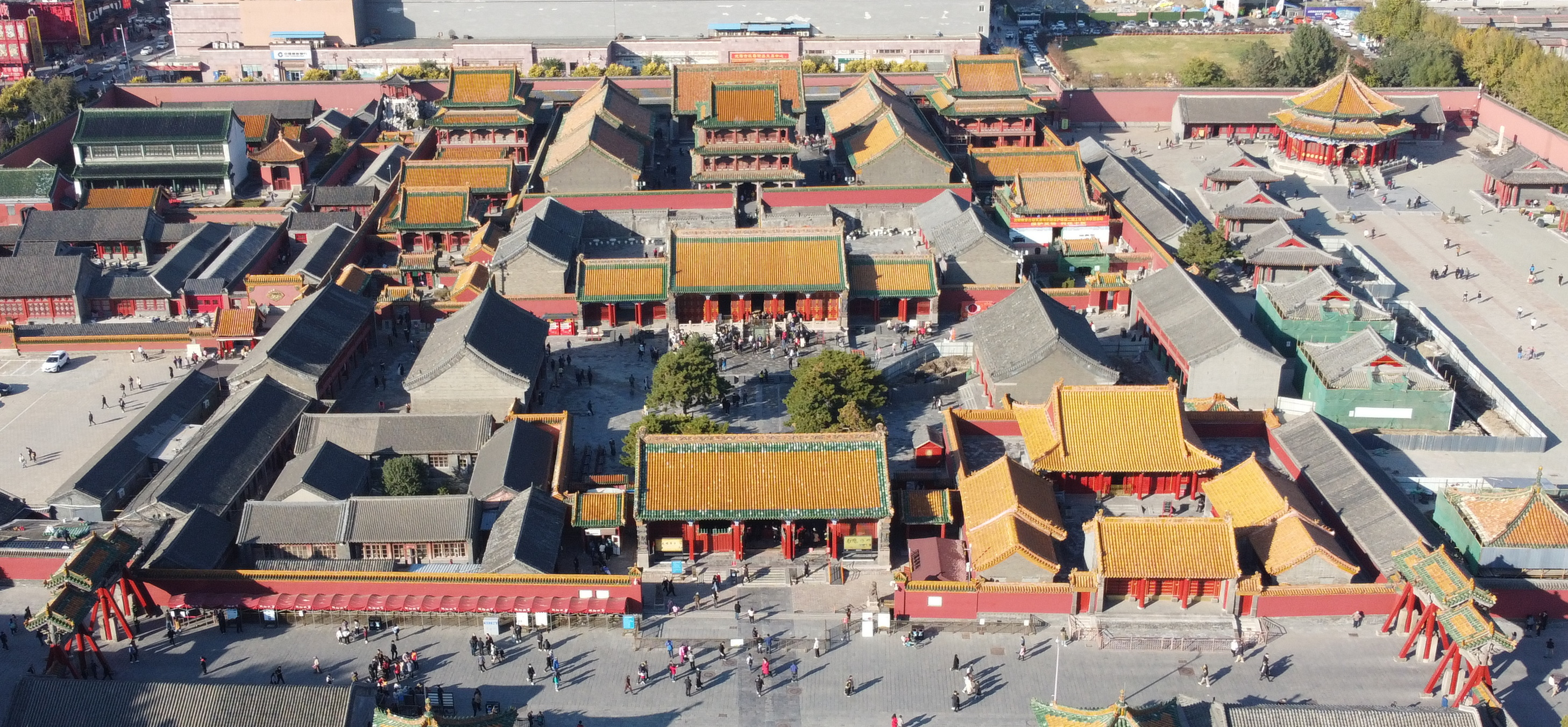
Drone view of the Shenyang Imperial Palace

A famed example of Chinese palaces is the Forbidden City, the imperial palace of the Chinese Empire from the Ming dynasty (since the Yongle Emperor) to the end of the Qing dynasty. Located in Beijing, it is the largest palace complex currently in existence in the world. The palace complex exemplifies traditional Chinese palatial architecture. Another example is the Summer Palace located in the northern suburb of Beijing and the Mukden Palace in Shenyang. The Presidential Palace in Nanjing and Imperial Palace of Manchukuo in Changchun display European architectural influences.

The Weiyang Palace built during the Han dynasty was the largest palace complex ever built in the world, but it was destroyed during the Tang dynasty.

Chinese palaces are designed in regular square grids and arranged in a formal layout consisting of main buildings and a number of pavilions enclosed within walls. Unlike massive single-structured European palaces or castles, Chinese palaces are a multitude of complexes containing several larger and smaller structures with parks and courtyards.

=== India ===
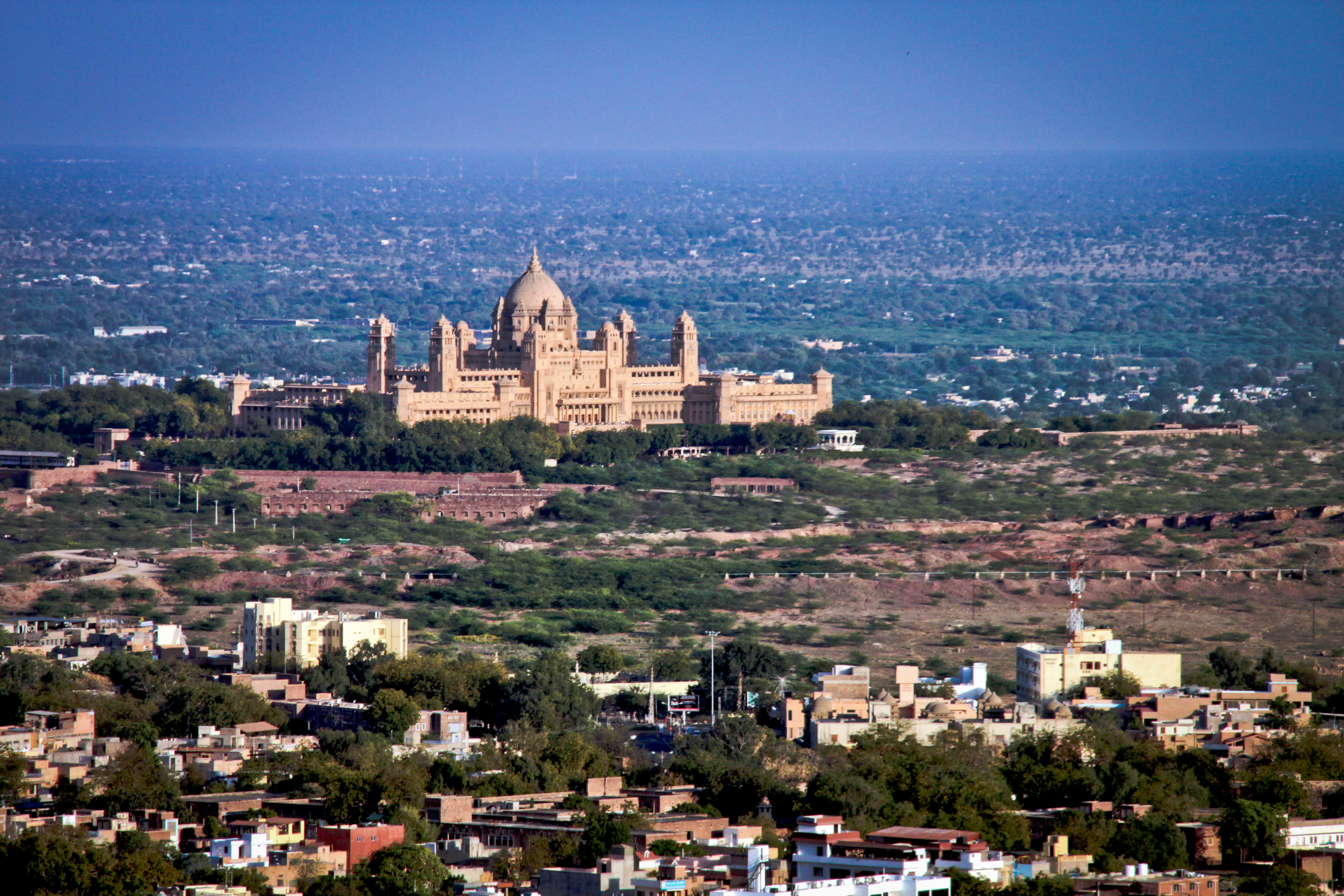
Umaid Bhawan Palace in Rajasthan

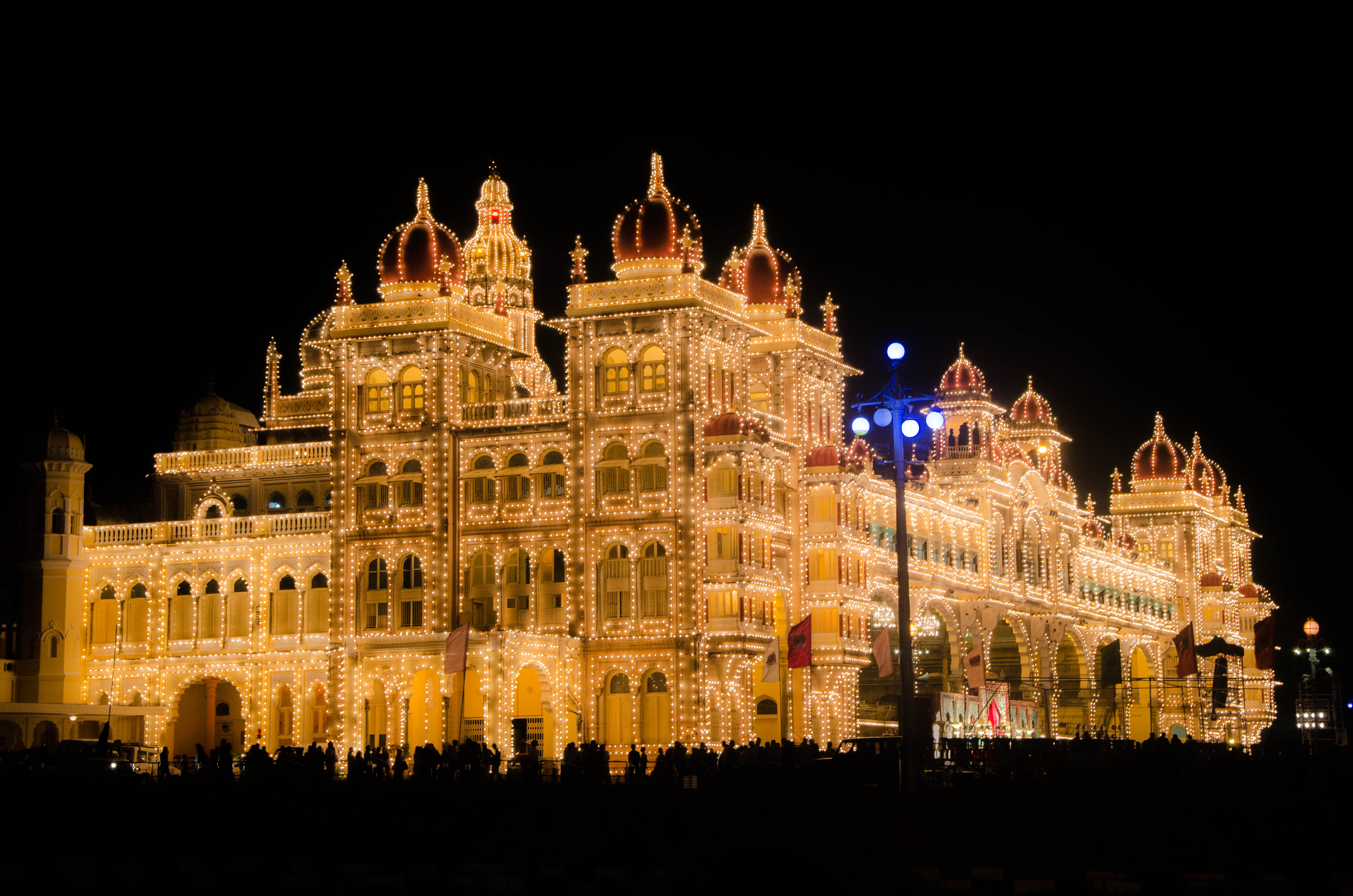
Amba Vilas Palace in Mysore, Karnataka.

India is home to many palaces and vast empires. Its history is full of numerous dynasties that have ruled over various parts of the country. While most monuments of the ancient period have been destroyed or lie in ruins, some medieval buildings have been maintained or restored to good condition. Several medieval forts and palaces still stand around India. These are examples of the achievements of the architects and engineers of that age. The palaces of India offer an insight into the life of the royalty of the country. While some royal palaces have been maintained as museums or hotels over the last decades, some are still homes for the members of the erstwhile royal families. These forts and palaces are the largest illustrations and legacy of the princely states of India. They feature floats of flowers in fountains, doric pillars, ornamental brackets, decorative staircases, and light streaming in through large windows. India possesses some interesting forts and palaces.

Rajasthan has many forts and palaces that are tourist destinations in North India. (See List of palaces in Rajasthan.) The Rajputs (collective term for the rulers of the region) were known as brave soldiers who preferred to die than be taken prisoners. They were also connoisseurs of art and brilliant builders. The most famous forts and palaces in Rajasthan are located in Chittor, Jodhpur, Jaipur, Udaipur, Saphieree, Amber and Nahargarh. Taj Hotels Resorts and Palaces manages some of the most iconic palaces of the region, Lake Palace, Udaipur; Umaid Bhawan Palace, Jodhpur; Fort Madhogarh, Jaipur and Rambagh Palace, Jaipur; and offer royal retreats to the guests.

Kolkata is known as the City of Palaces within the Indian context, referring to the numerous grand residential buildings that dotted the city from the end of the 18th century onwards, as it grew to become one of the largest cities of the British Raj.

Karnataka is known as the City of Palaces is famous for the Amba Vilas Palace (commonly known as Mysore Palace) in Mysuru / Mysore, which was the palace of the Wodeyar kings. It is the second most visited monument in India after Taj Mahal. It was said to have been built of wood until it had to be rebuilt after a fire that burned down the entire palace complex.

=== Indonesia ===
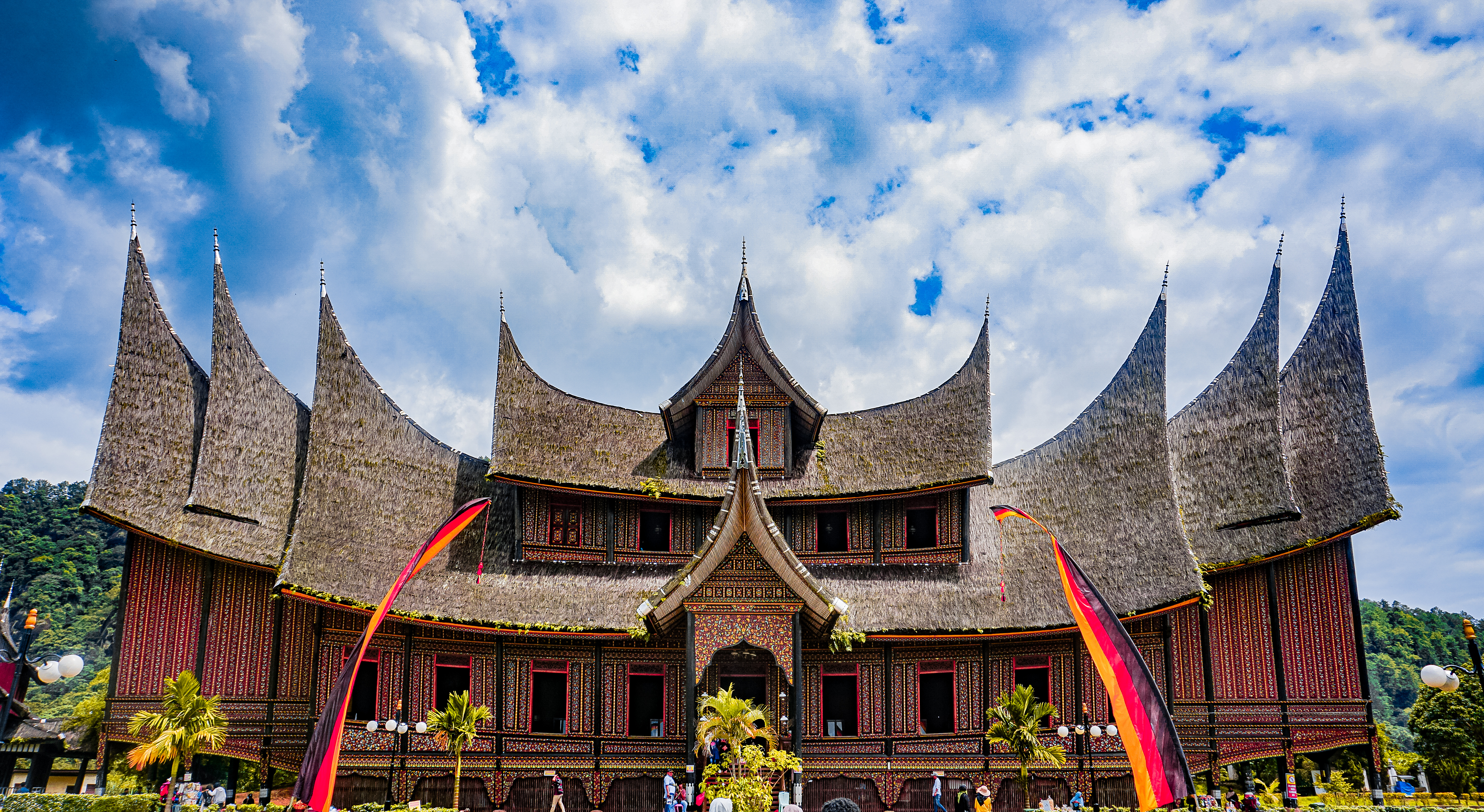
Pagaruyung Palace

In Indonesia, palaces are known as istana (Malay and Indonesian), or kraton (Javanese and Sundanese). In Bali the royal palace compound is called puri. The palaces reflect the long history and diverse culture of the Indonesian archipelago.

Although Indonesia is now a republic, some of its parts and provinces still retain and preserve their traditional royal heritage, for example the Sultanate of Yogyakarta, Surakarta, Mangkunegaran princedom, Kasepuhan palace in Cirebon, as well as the Sultanate of Pontianak and Kutai in East Kalimantan. Remnants of palaces and royal houses still can be found in Banten, Medan, Ternate, Tidore, Bima, Bali and Sumenep. Most of whom are now Museums. The layout of traditional Balinese and Javanese kratons is similar to the Chinese concept of walled compounds of royal pavilions, squares and gardens. Most of these kratons took the form of wooden pavilions called pendopo, while the istana of Sumatra usually consist of a single large structure. Typical Minangkabau vernacular architecture can be found in Pagaruyung Palace, West Sumatra. An example of Malay palace is Istana Maimun in Medan and the Siak Sri Indrapura Palace in Siak.

During the VOC and colonial era of the Dutch East Indies, the colonial government built several European stately palaces as the residence of the governor-general. Most of these European palaces have now become the state palace of the Republic of Indonesia. Indonesian state palaces are the neoclassic Merdeka Palace and Bogor Palace.

=== Iran ===
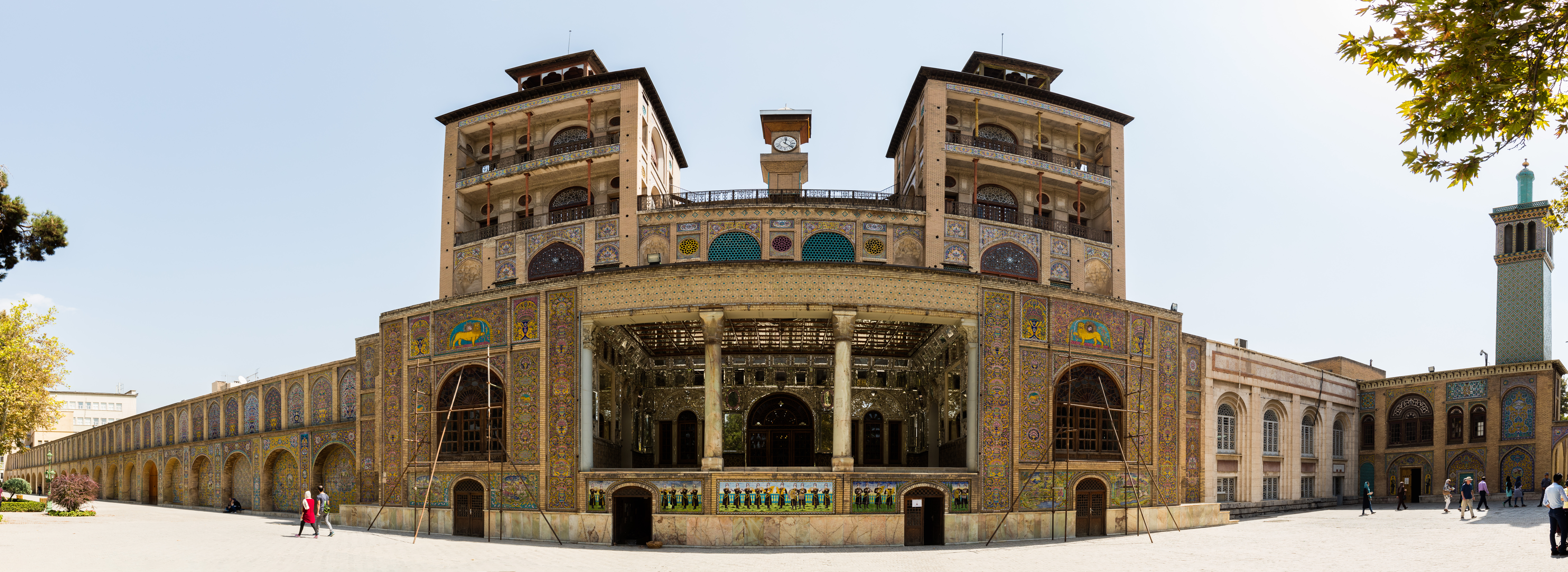
Golestan Palace in Tehran

The Niavaran Complex is a historic complex situated in northern Tehran, Iran. It consists of several buildings and a museum. The Sahebgharaniyeh Palace, from the reign of Naser al-Din Shah of the Qajar dynasty, is also inside this complex. The main Niavaran Palace, completed in 1968, was the primary residence of the last shah, Mohammad Reza Pahlavi of the Pahlavi dynasty, until the 1979 Iranian Revolution. The main palace was designed by the Iranian architect Mohsen Foroughi.

=== Israel ===
The pre-Israelite Canaanite site of Tel Kabri, destroyed in c. 1600 BCE, was built around a palace core. A palace culture of ancient Israel and Judah can be inferred from the Hebrew Bible, and the Iron Age Omride palace at Samaria has been excavated by archaeologists; no palace of David has been securely identified, and the historicity of Solomon is yet to be proven.

From the Late Hellenistic or Hasmonean and the Early Roman or Herodian period, there are many historical palaces like the two at Masada. Palaces of Herod the Great and his line of client kings and rulers have been further identified at several sites, including Herod's royal palace at Jerusalem, the Hasmonean and Herodian winter palaces at Jericho, and Herod's fortified palace and second administrative seat at Herodium in the Judean desert. Herod's palace at Caesarea Maritima preserved its palatial function as the official residence of the Roman procurators and governors of In Judaea.

There are other much later palaces in the Old City of Jerusalem, such as the Mamluk Lady Tunshuk Palace.

There are a number of magnificent 19th-century buildings that are not considered "palaces", but have the grandeur of a typical palace, such as the Yehudayoff-Hefetz residence, and the Sergei Courtyard in Jerusalem.

=== Japan ===
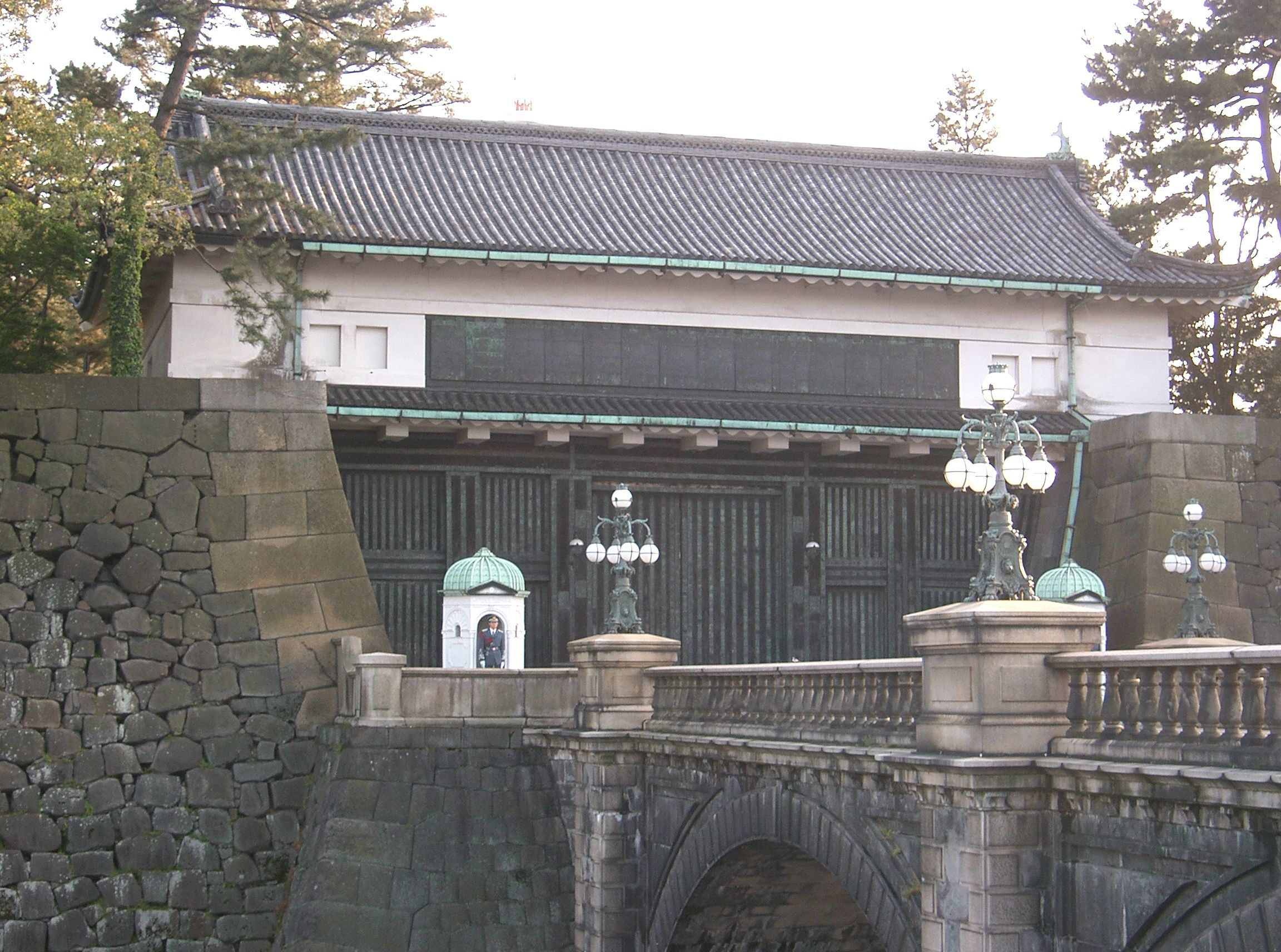
Tokyo Imperial Palace

Of the palaces in Japan, many are located in Tokyo, such as the Tokyo Imperial Palace, which houses Japan's royal family. The imperial palace was built on the site of Edo Castle. Other Japanese palaces are located in Kyoto, the former capital of Japan. Most Japanese palaces are built in a "castle" style formation, as a large pagoda. This helps reinforce the palace from earthquakes.

=== Korea ===
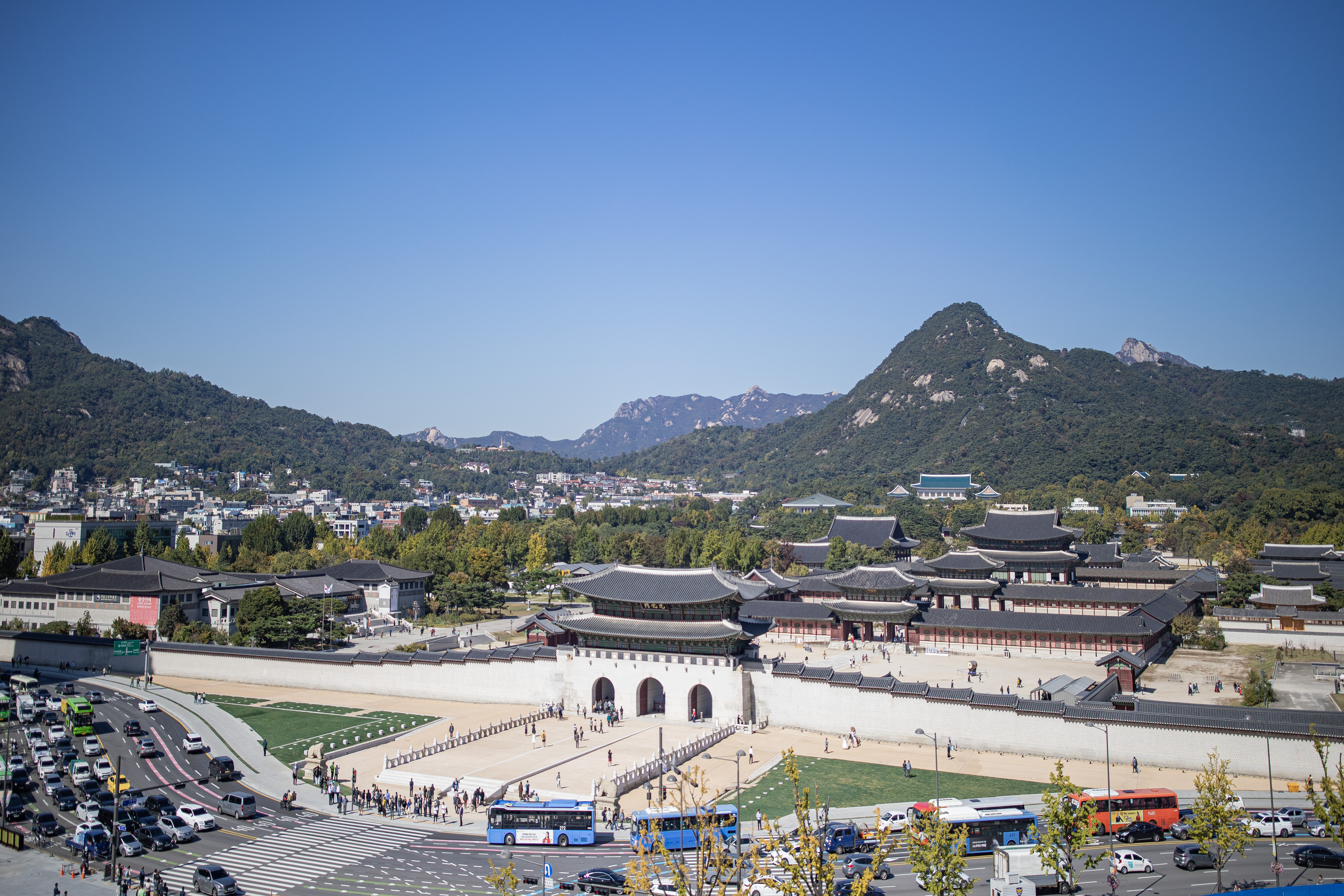
The Gyeongbokgung, first built in 1395, Seoul

Korea has used many palaces since ancient times, although many have been destroyed. Palaces were built within, but not limited to Seoul, Kaeseong, Pyeongyang, Gyeongju, and Buyeo, as well as in various cities located outside of modern Korea. Today, only Joseon dynasty palaces are still intact, even then, very downsized due to years of colonialism, war, and neglect. The most emblematic of these surviving palaces is the Gyeongbokgung, the primary palace of the Joseon Dynasty. Other examples include the Changdeokgung, Changgyeonggung, Deoksugung, and Gyeonghuigung. All of these are from the Joseon dynasty and survive to this day, though many had to be reconstructed during the recent decades following their destruction during the colonial period. Other famous examples include the Manwoldae, the palace of the Goryeo dynasty located in Kaeseong, the Banwolseong, the palace of Silla located in Gyeongju, and Anhak Palace, the palace of Goguryeo located in Pyeongyang.

=== Lebanon ===
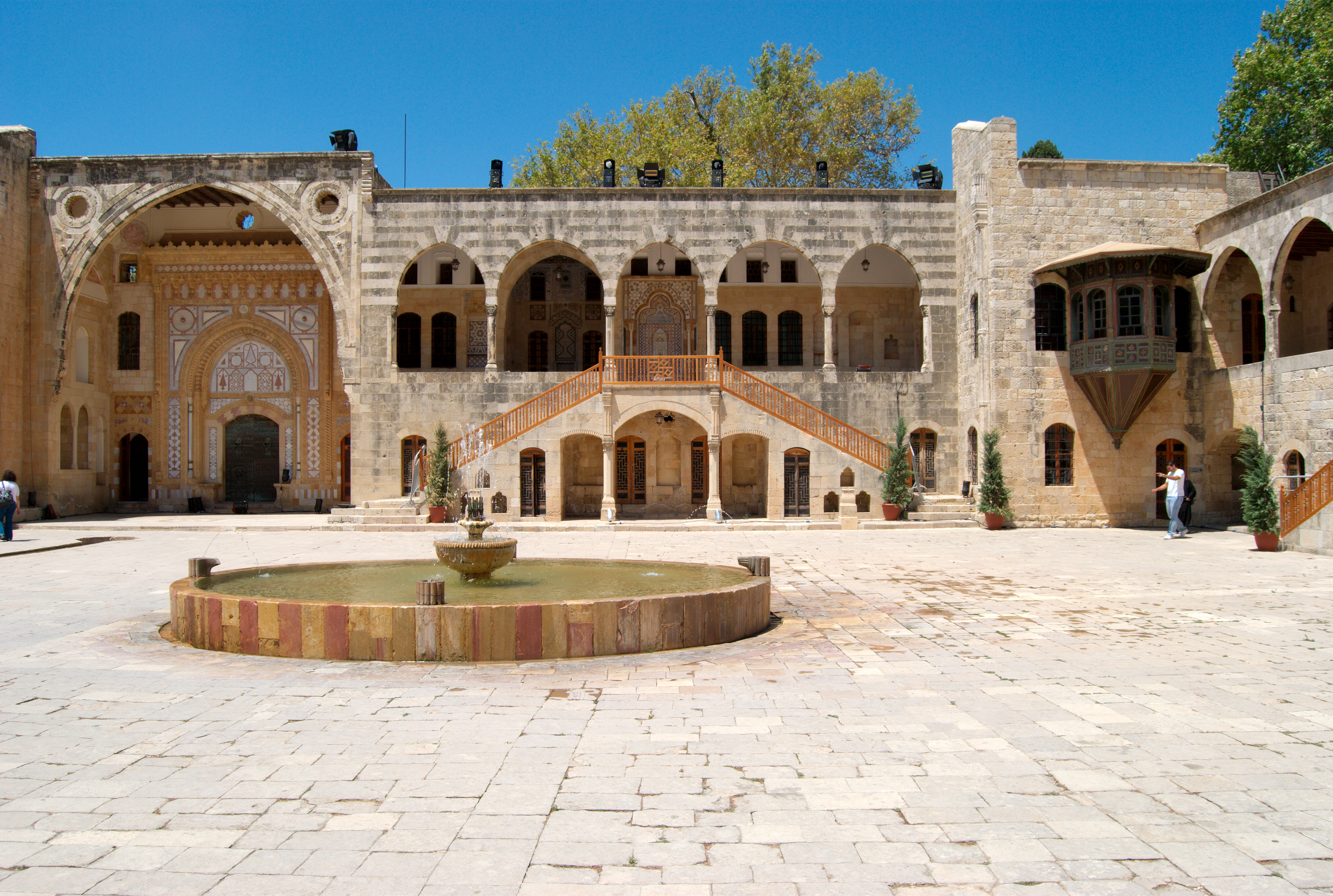
Beiteddine Palace built in the 15th century in Lebanon

Palaces have existed in Lebanon since the time of the Phoenicians. Almost all of the palaces of ancient Phoenicia have been destroyed.

During the Renaissance palaces were built in Lebanon, especially in the Chouf region of Mount Lebanon. Lebanese palaces are very diverse architecturally, being influenced by Arabs, Italians, French, Persians, Turkish and East Asians. This is seen in the Beiteddine Palace, which is a mixture of traditional Lebanese, Italian, Arabic and Persian architecture.

Today in Lebanon there are at least ten buildings that can be classified as palaces, including the Beiteddine Palace, Grand Serail (one of the largest in the world), Baabda Palace, Sursock Museum, Seraglio of Baabda and Fakhreddine Palace.

=== Malaysia ===
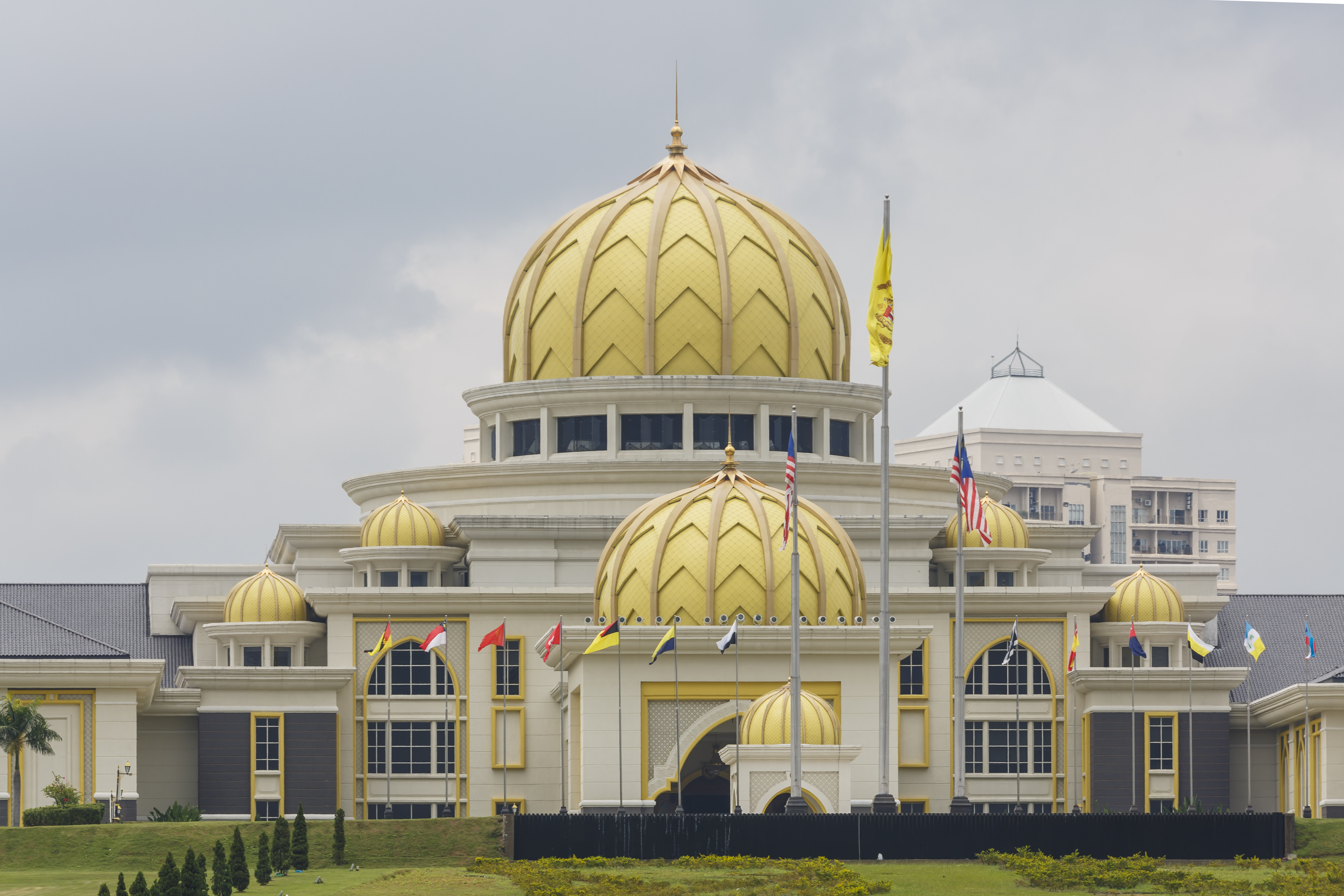
Istana Negara (National Palace), the official residence of the king of Malaysia

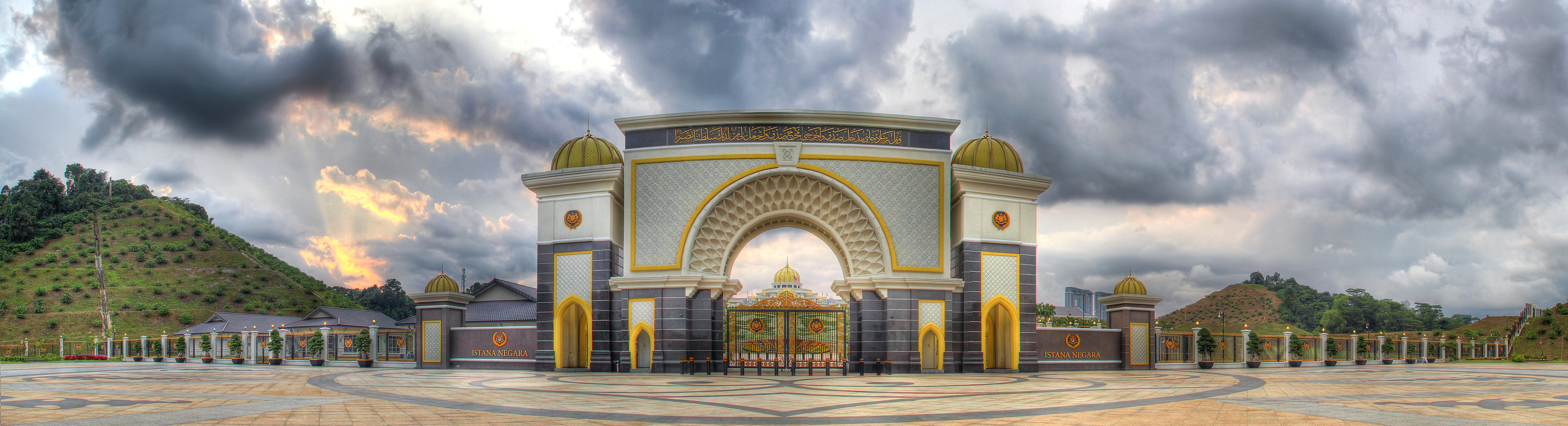
The monumental gate of Istana Negara Jalan Duta, Malaysia

Malaysia, a constituent of nine states, is ruled by hereditary sultans. Every five years, one sultan is elected as Yang di-Pertuan Agong (Supreme King), the head of state of Malaysia. The Yang di-Pertuan Agong has a palace, referred to as an istana. Each of the other sultans has their own istana, located in their state. Throughout the country they are sometimes called Istana Hinggap.

The Yang di-Pertuan Agong's official residences are the Istana Negara, Jalan Duta; the Royal Museum; and Istana Melawati, a palace and retreat, located in Putrajaya. Some of the other official palaces are the Istana Besar, Istana Anak Bukit, Istana Pekan, Istana Maziah, Istana Alam Shah, Istana Balai Besar, Istana Besar Seri Menanti, Istana Iskandariah and Istana Arau. Several appointed governors, or Yang di-Pertua Negeri, are also assigned to have their official seat and residence such as The Astana, Istana Negeri Sabah and Seri Mutiara.

=== Nepal ===
Singha Durbar (literally, Lion Palace) in Kathmandu is the official seat of government of Nepal.

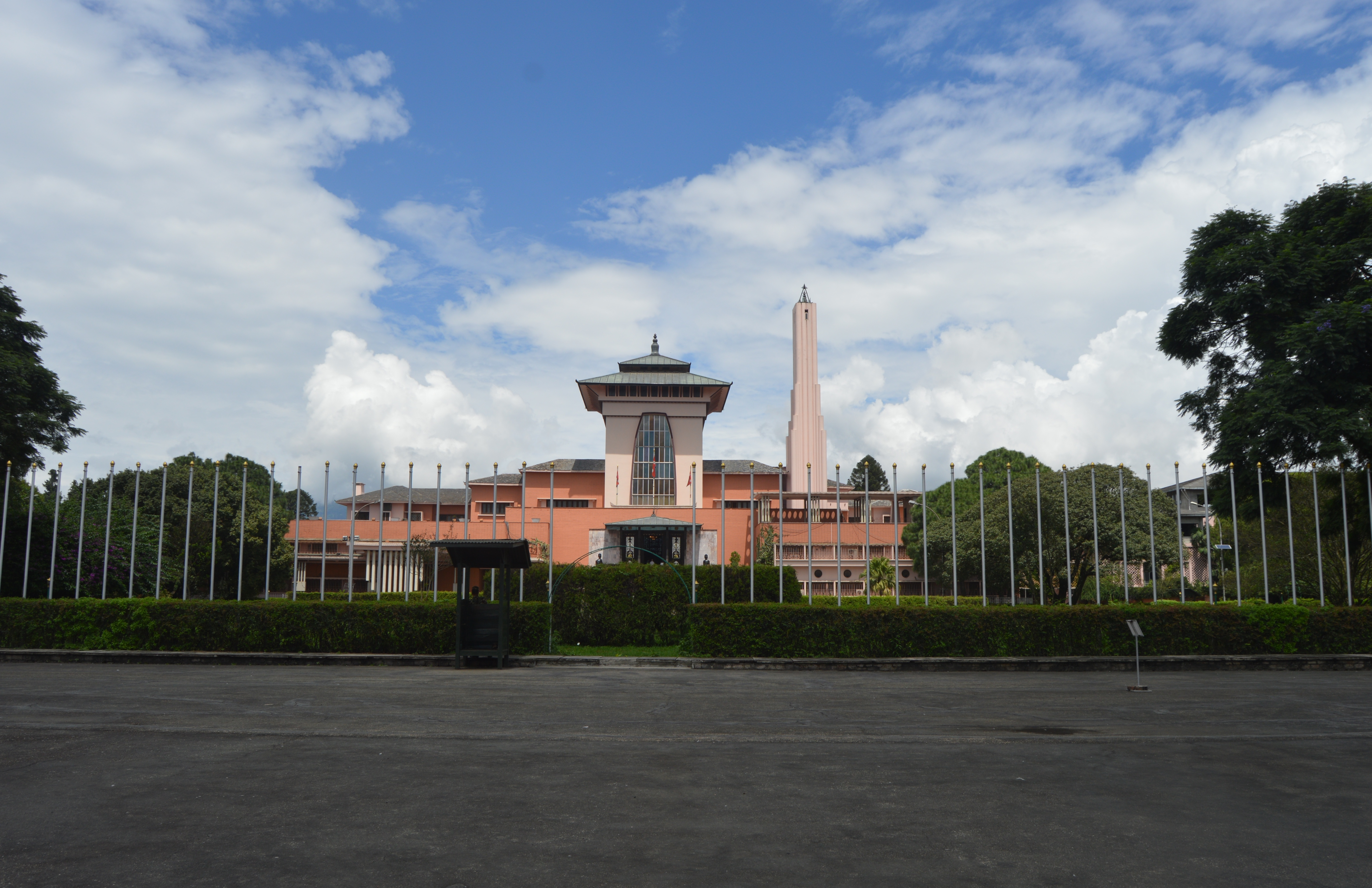
Narayanhiti Palace

Narayanhiti Palace Museum was a residence and principal workplace of the reigning monarch of the Kingdom of Nepal. It was built by King Mahendra in 1961 under the design of Californian architect Benjamin Polk. After the 2006 revolution that overthrew the monarchy, this royal palace was turned into a public museum.

Older palaces include the Durbar Squares, which are enlisted as UNESCO World Heritage Sites. They are located in Kathmandu Valley in districts of Kathmandu, Bhaktapur and Lalitpur. In Kathmandu is Kathmandu Durbar Square, Bhaktapur Durbar Square in Bhaktapur, Patan Durbar Square in Lalitpur.

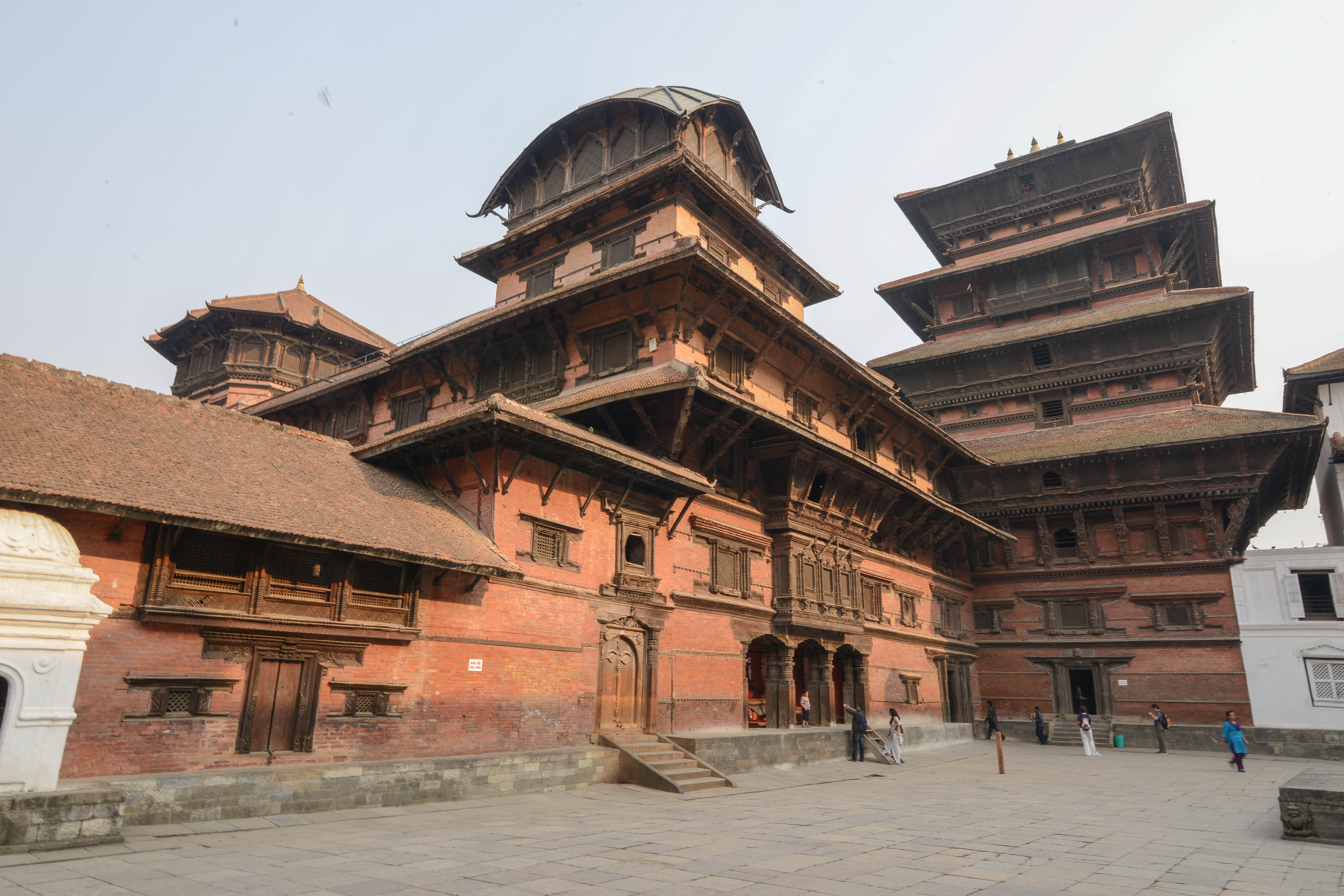
Kathmandu Durbar Square

Kathmandu Durbar Square (Basantapur Darbar Kshetra) in front of the old royal palace of the former Kathmandu Kingdom is one of three durbar (royal palace) squares in the Kathmandu Valley in Nepal, all of which are UNESCO World Heritage Sites.

Several buildings in the Square collapsed due to a major earthquake on 25 April 2015. Durbar Square was surrounded with spectacular architecture and vividly showcases the skills of the Newar artists and craftsmen over several centuries. The Royal Palace was originally at Dattaraya square and was later moved to Durbar square.

The Kathmandu Durbar Square held the palaces of the Malla and Shah kings who ruled over the city. Along with these palaces, the square surrounds quadrangles, revealing courtyards and temples. It is known as Hanuman Dhoka Durbar Square, a name derived from a statue of Hanuman, the monkey devotee of Lord Ram, at the entrance of the palace.

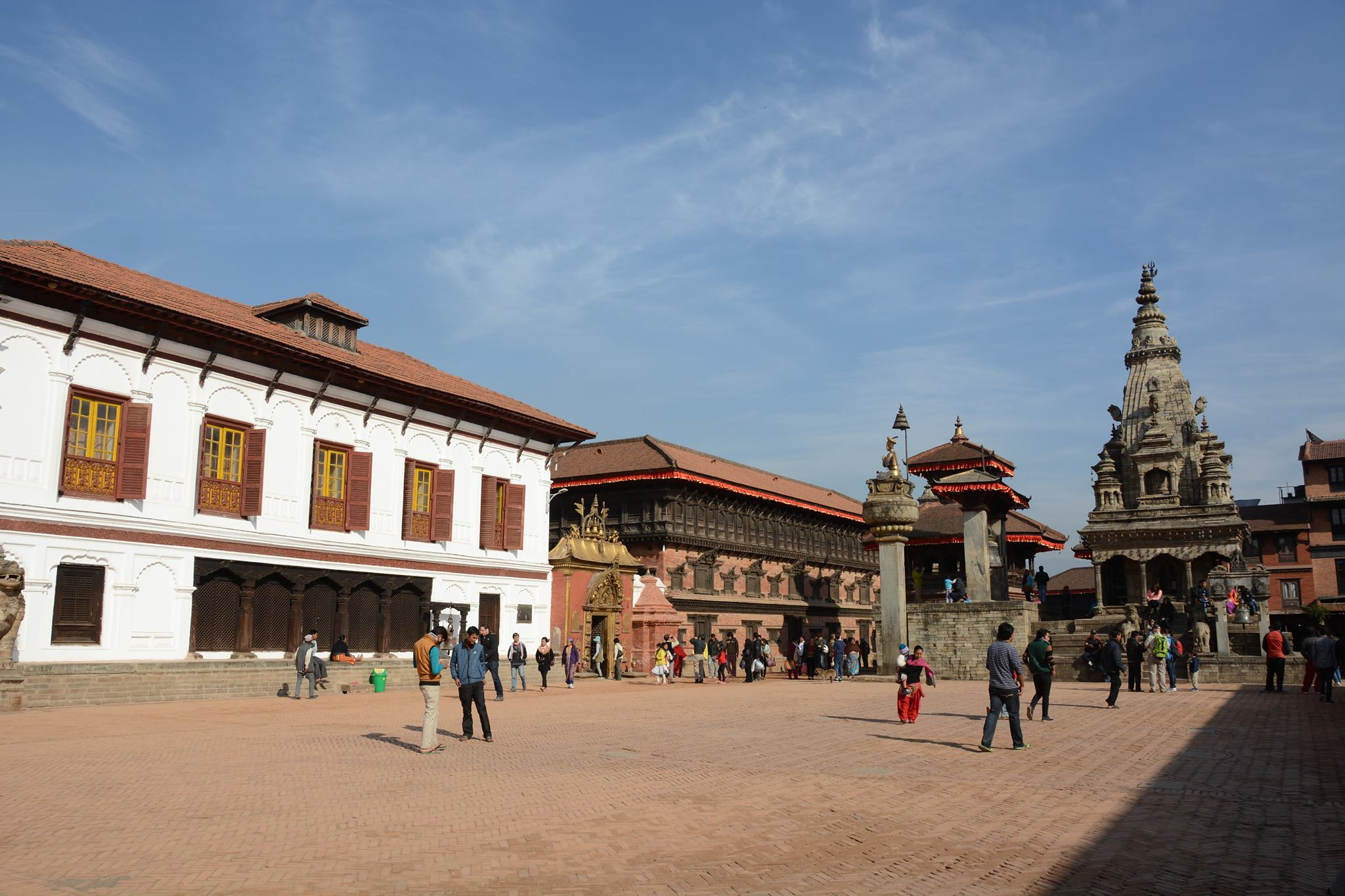
Bhaktapur Durbar Square

Bhaktapur Durbar Square is the plaza in front of the royal palace of the old Bhaktapur Kingdom. It is also a UNESCO World Heritage Site.

The Bhaktapur Durbar Square is located in the current town of Bhaktapur, also known as Bhadgaon, which lies 13 km east of Kathmandu. While the complex consists of at least four distinct squares (Durbar Square, Taumadhi Square, Dattatreya Square and Pottery Square), the whole area is informally known as the Bhakapur Durbar Square and is a highly visited site in the Kathmandu Valley. This palace consists of 55 windows so it is also known as '55 Windowed Palace'.

Patan Durbar Square is situated at the centre of the city of Lalitpur in Nepal. It is also one of the three durbar squares in the Kathmandu Valley, all of which are UNESCO World Heritage Sites. One of its attraction is the ancient royal palace where the Malla kings of Lalitpur resided.

The Durbar Square is a marvel of Newa architecture. The floor of the square is tiled with red bricks. There are many temples and idols in the area. The main temples are aligned opposite of the western face of the palace. The entrance of the temples faces east, towards the palace. There is also a bell situated in the alignment beside the main temples. The Square also holds old Newari residential houses. There are various other temples and structures in and around Patan Durbar Square built by the Newa People.

=== Philippines ===
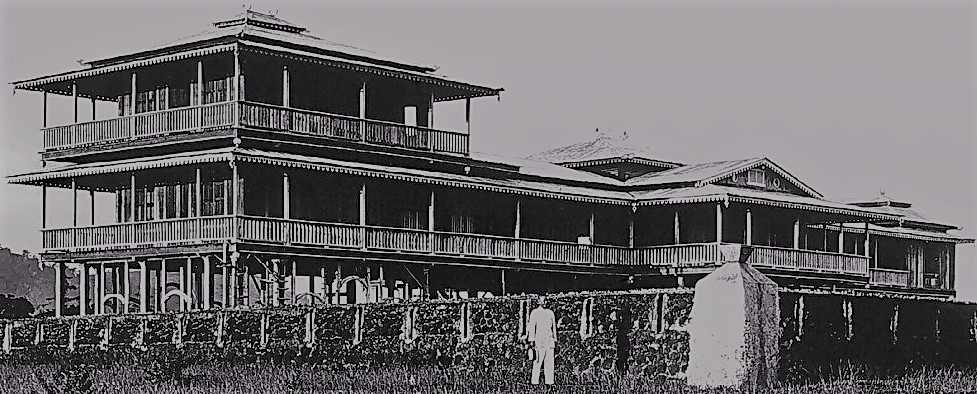
Daru Jambangan, royal palace of the Sultanate of Sulu

In pre-Hispanic Philippines, Filipinos built large wooden residences for the ancient nobility and royalty (such as lakans, wangs, rajahs and datus) called torogan or bahay lakan ("king's house"). The windows of the torogan are slits and richly framed in wood panels with okir designs located in front of the house. The communal kitchen is half a meter lower than the main house and is both used for cooking and eating. The distinct high gable roof of the torogan, thin at the apex and gracefully flaring out to the eaves, sits on a huge structures enclosed by slabs of timber and lifted more than two meters above the ground by a huge trunk of a tree that was set on a rock. The end floor beams lengthen as panolongs the seemed to lift up the whole house. The torogan is suffused with decorations. There were diongal at the apex of the roof, also an intricately carved tinai a walai, okir designs in the floor, on windows and on panolongs.

The people in the southern part of Philippines built the same wooden palaces such as the langgal of the Tausug. In the Sultanate of Sulu, a palace was built for the sultans and was named Astana Darul Jambangan (white adobe), which was destroyed by a typhoon in 1912. A replica of the royal palace has been rebuilt as an attraction in Mt. Bayug Eco-Cultural Park in the town of Talipao, Sulu.

During the Spanish era, the government of the Spanish East Indies built a succession of palaces in and around Manila for high colonial officials and religious authorities. The most famous of these is the 18th-century Malacañang Palace, which originally housed Spanish and American governors-general and, since the Commonwealth, the president of the Philippines.

Former president and strongman Ferdinand Marcos had Coconut Palace constructed in 1978 to showcase the country's varied uses for the coconut. It serves as the home and office of the vice-president. In 2004, President Gloria Macapagal Arroyo converted the former Aduana (customs house) in Cebu City into a small palace, called Malacañang sa Sugbo.

=== Vietnam ===
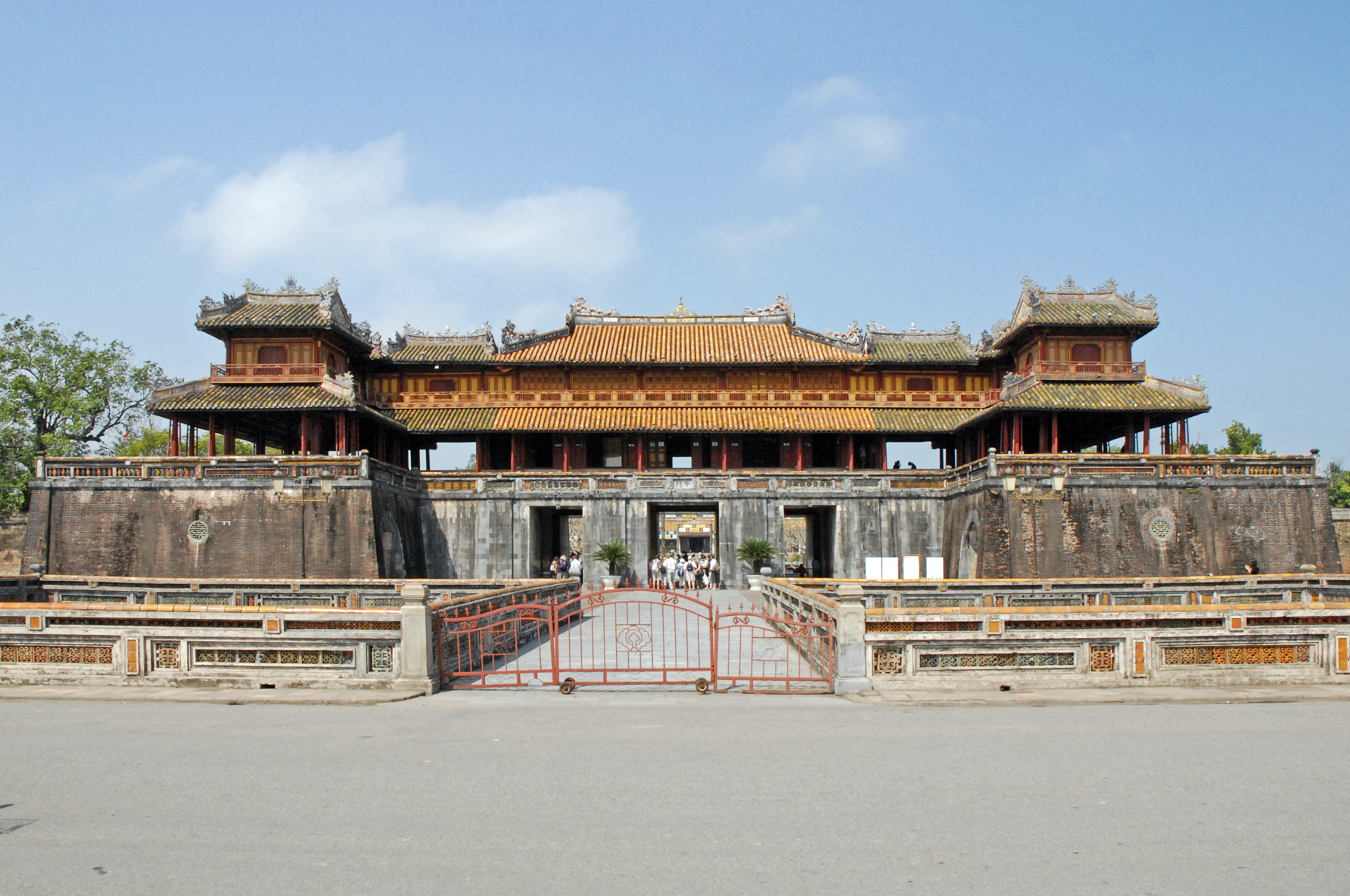
Meridian gate, Imperial City of Hue

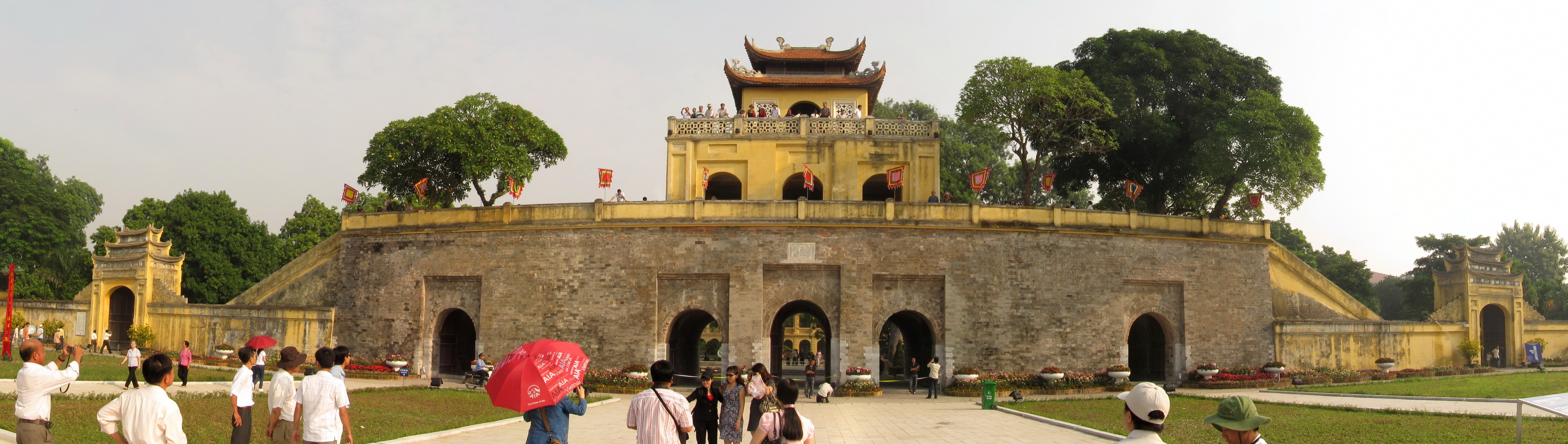
Doan Mon gate, Imperial Citadel of Thang Long

== Europe ==
=== Belgium ===
The city of Bruges:

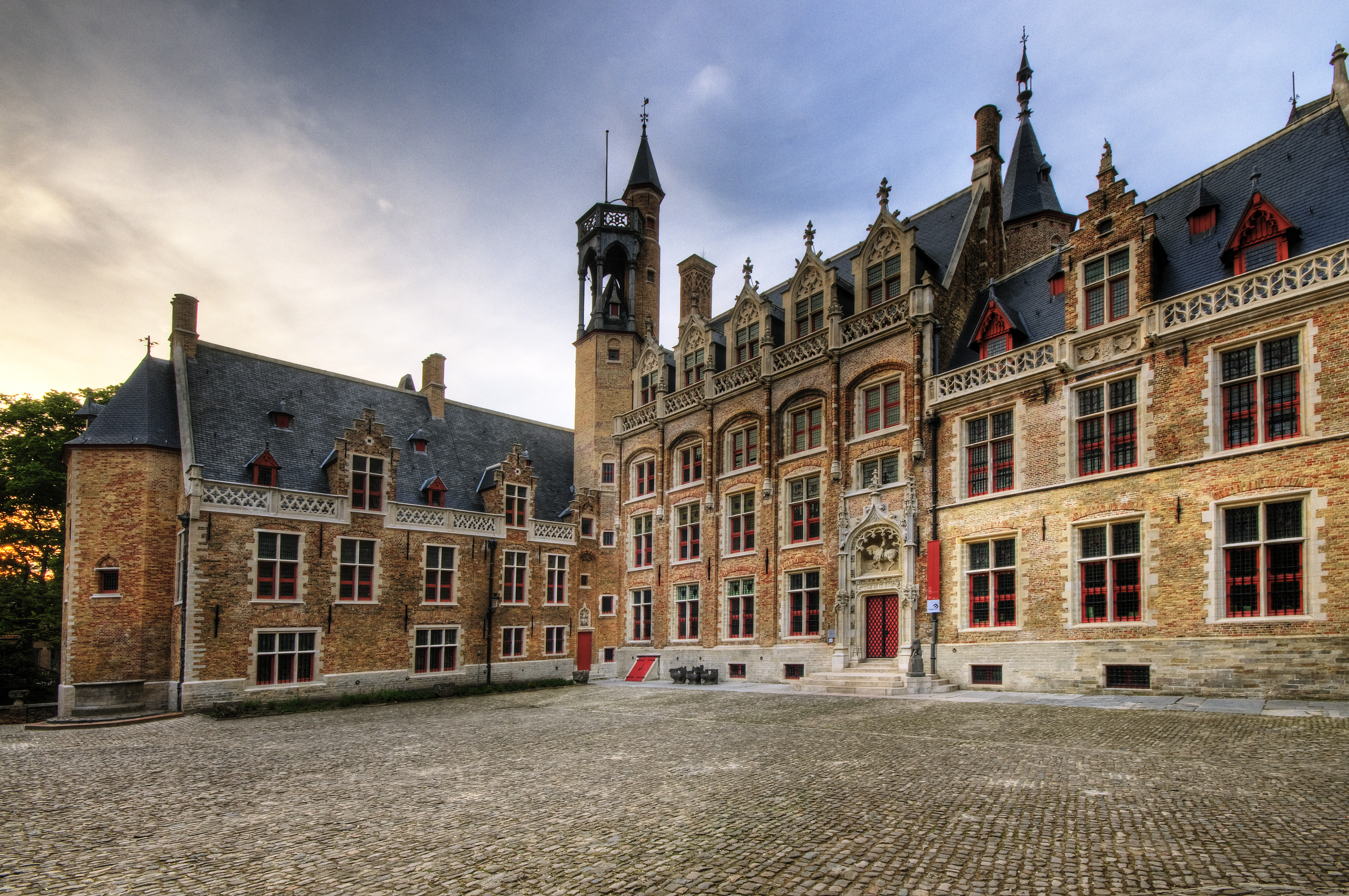
Exterior view of the Gruuthuse

The Gruuthusemuseum is a museum of applied arts in Bruges, located in the late medieval Gruuthuse, the Palace of Louis de Gruuthuse. The collection ranges from the 15th to the 19th century.

Presumably in the 13th century, a rich family from Bruges received the monopoly to levy taxes on gruit, and built storage for it. The building was changed in the early fifteenth century by Jan IV van der Aa to a luxury house for his family, which subsequently changed its name to "Van Gruuthuse" ("From the Gruit house"). His son Louis de Gruuthuse added a second wing to the house, and in 1472 a "chapel". This is in a bridge which connects the house to the adjacent Church of Our Lady, Bruges, so that members of the household could see the high altar from wide windows in the room. However the building was very heavily restored in the 19th century.

The city of Mechelen houses several palaces:

"Hof van Kamerijk" or "Palace of Margaret of York", 15th-century building. Also called "Keizershof" (English; literally "Emperor's Court") because several royal children resided here and received education at this court, including Charles V (Holy Roman Emperor and Archduke of Austria, King of Spain and Duke of Burgundy)

"Hof van Savoye" or "Palace of Margaret of Austria", early 16th-century building and one of the first Renaissance buildings in northern Europe.

The "Hof van Busleyden", early 16th-century Renaissance palace of Hieronymus van Busleyden; The "Archbishop 's palace", 18th-century building and the official seat of the Archbishop of the Roman Catholic province Belgium; The "Hof van Palermo", 15th-century palace of Jan I Carondelet; The "Hof van Hoogstraten", 16th-century palace of Antoon I van Lalaing; The "Hof van Nassau", 15th-century building which served as temporary court of Margaret of York when she arrived in Mechelen after her marriage with Charles the Bold; The "Hof van Cortenbach", 16th-century building; The "Hof van Coloma", 18th-century palace of Jean Ernest Coloma, Baron of St-Pieters Leeuw and member of the Coloma family

The city of Brussels has also several remaining and notable palaces: "The Royal Palace of Brussels", the official palace of the King and Queen of the Belgians, The Egmont palace, The Palace of Prince Charles Alexander Emanuel of Lorraine and Hotel Errera. The Palace of Coudenberg, the main Renaissance palace and seat of government power, burnt down completely in 1731.

=== France ===
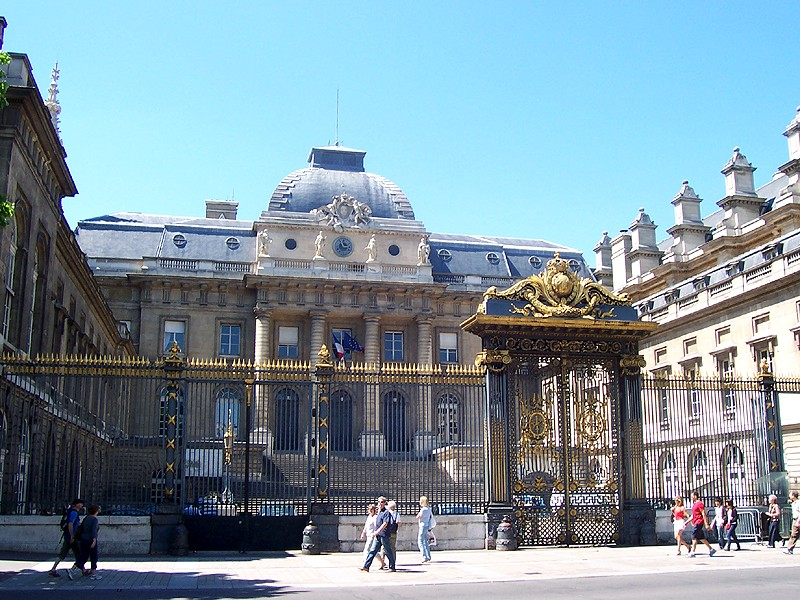
Palais de Justice of Paris, France

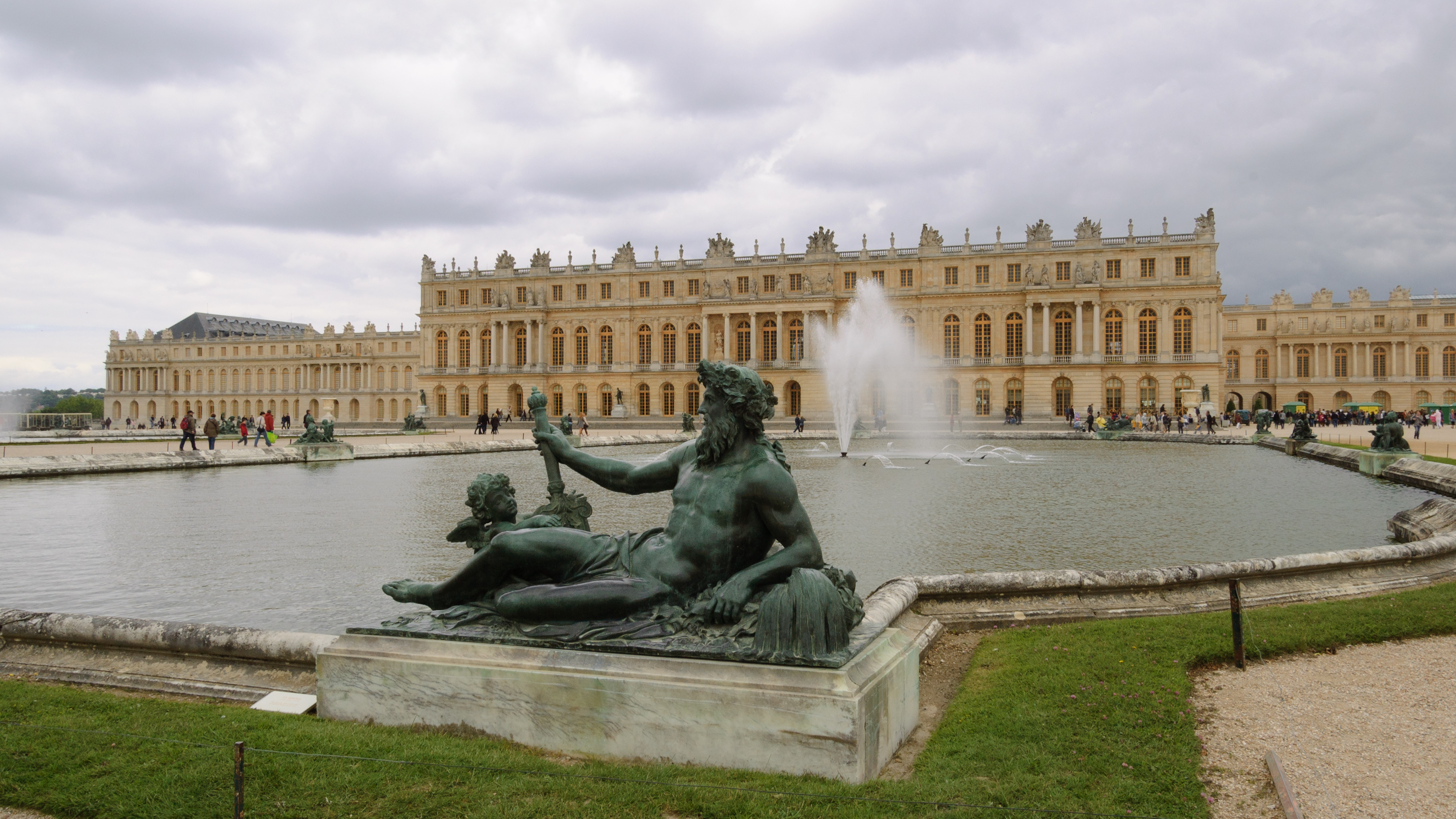
Palace of Versailles

In France there has been a clear distinction between a château and a palais. The palace has always been urban, like the Palais de la Cité in Paris, which was the royal palace of France and is now the supreme court of justice of France, or the palace of the Popes at Avignon.

The château, by contrast, has always been in rural settings, supported by its demesne, even when it was no longer actually fortified. Speakers of English think of the "Palace of Versailles" because it was the residence of the king of France, and the king was the source of power, though the building has always remained the Château de Versailles for the French, and the seat of government under the Ancien Régime remained the Palais du Louvre. The Louvre had begun as a fortified Château du Louvre on the edge of Paris, but as the seat of government and shorn of its fortified architecture and then completely surrounded by the city, it developed into the Palais du Louvre.

The hôtel particulier remains the term for an urban residence sited entre cour et jardin, behind a forecourt and opening onto a garden; when fronting directly on streets, they are maisons, "houses". Bishops always had a palais in the town of their diocese, an hôtel in other towns, though they might possess chateaux.

The usage is essentially the same in Italy, Spain and Portugal, as well as the former Austrian Empire. In Vienna, Austria, all large mansions belonging to aristocratic or very wealthy families were traditionally called palais, but this never applied to imperial palaces themselves which were called Burg within the city and Schloss when outside it. In Germany, the wider term was a relatively recent importation and was used rather more restrictively.

=== Germany ===
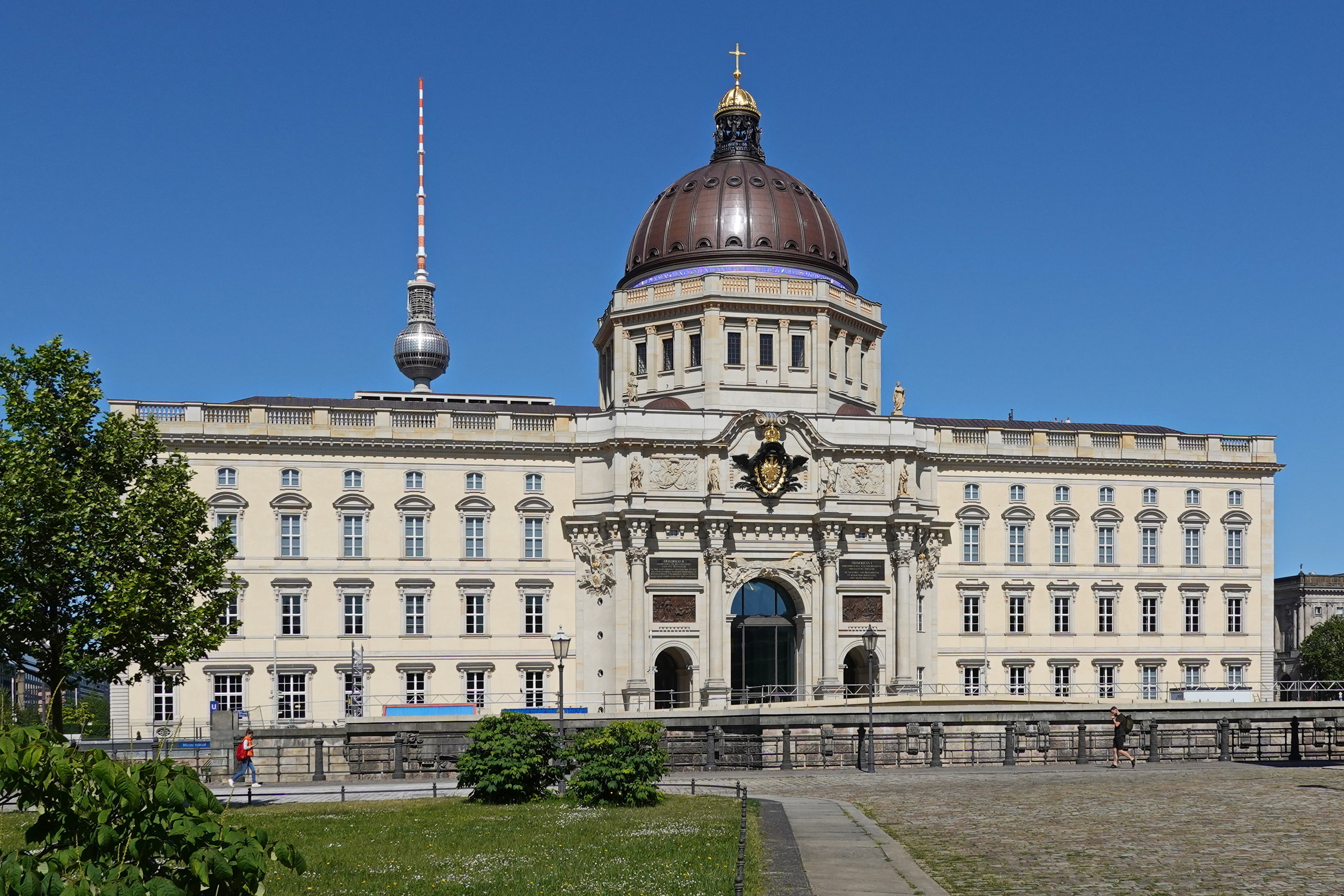
The Berlin Palace in Berlin, Germany

The Charlottenburg Palace in Berlin, Germany

In medieval German, a palas was a building within a castle complex which served as a residence for the nobility, with rooms suitable for receiving guests and holding banquets. Modern German Palast is mainly associated with the large palatial complexes and gardens that became popular in the baroque period. The word Schloss originally referred to a fortified castle, but it too has come to refer to a palace, typically a country residence. By contrast, the word Burg is still mainly used for the fortified castles of medieval times.

Germany offers a variety of more than 25,000 castles and palaces and thousands of manor houses. The country is known for its fairy tale-like scenery palatial buildings, such as Sanssouci, Linderhof Palace, Herrenchiemsee, Schwetzingen, Nordkirchen and Schwerin Palace. Many of these buildings have a history of over 1000 years, ranging from fortifications to royal residences. Many German castles after the Middle Ages were mainly built as royal or ducal palaces rather than as a fortified building.

=== Hungary ===
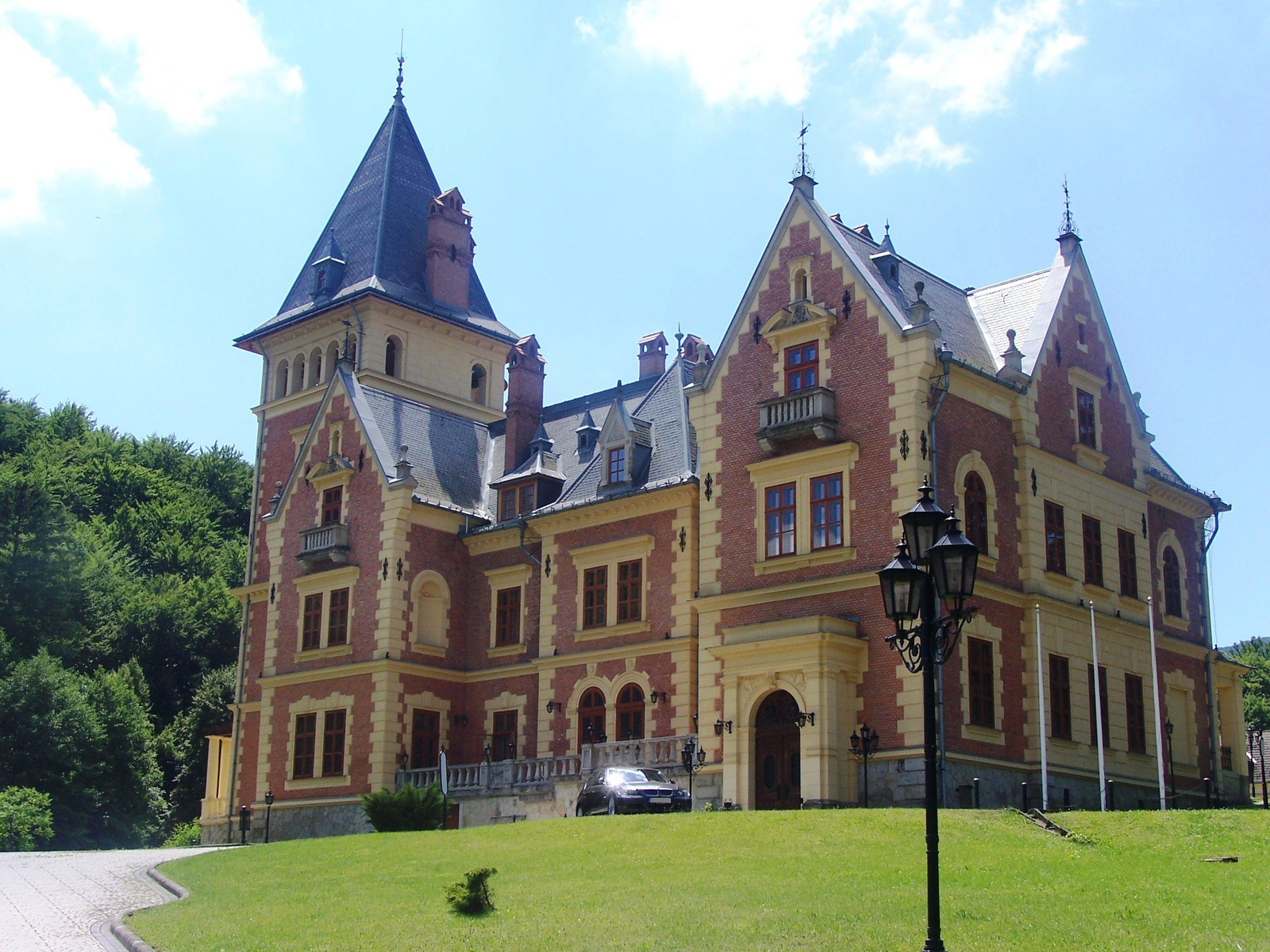
Károlyi Palace of Parádsasvár, Hungary

In Hungary distinction is made between urban and rural residencies. Only the urban residencies of the higher aristocracy were called palota (palace); rural stately homes were named kastély (mansion), or in case of smaller country houses, kúria. Noble landowner families, like the House of Esterházy, often had several mansions in the countryside and palaces in towns. The office of the president of the Republic of Hungary, Sándor Palace, was the residence of the Sándor family in the 19th century. Royal residencies were also called palaces, for example, the Early Renaissance summer palace of King Matthias Corvinus in Visegrád or Buda Castle which was called Királyi-palota (Royal Palace). In the second half of the 19th century, splendid new townhouses of the bourgeoisie on Andrássy út and elsewhere in Budapest were named palaces. A typical example is the Art Nouveau Gresham Palace, which was built by an insurance company. Grand public buildings and even blocks of flats of higher standard were regularly called palaces (the contemporary term of the latter were bérpalota meaning rent palace). For contemporary buildings the term is seldom used with the notable exemption of the Palace of Arts.

=== Ireland ===
In Ireland, the term "palace" (Irish: pailís) is rarely used. The main royal residence in Ireland, Dublin Castle, was never called a palace, nor is Hillsborough Castle, the main royal residence of Northern Ireland.

The word "palace" is largely restricted to large official dwellings for Church of Ireland bishops:

- Bishop's Palace at Achadh Úr (modern Freshford), home of the medieval Bishop of Freshford
- Braganza, Carlow, home of the Bishops of Kildare and Leighlin
- Archbishop's Palace, Cashel, County Tipperary, home of the Archbishop of Cashel and Emly; built in 1732, now the Cashel Palace Hotel.
- Bishop's Palace, Cork, home of the Bishop of Cork, Cloyne and Ross
- The Palace, Cobh, former home of the Bishop of Cloyne
- Palace of the Archbishop of Dublin at Saint Sepulchre's, former home of the Archbishop of Dublin
- Bishop's Palace at Elphin, former home of the Bishop of Elphin
- Bishop's Palace, Ennis, also called Westbourne, home of the Bishop of Killaloe.
- Bishop's Palace of Kilkenny, a summer house for the Bishops of Ossory, built by Richard Pococke
- Bishop's Palace, Killarney, former home of the Bishop of Ardfert and Aghadoe
- Bishop's Palace, Kilmore, County Cavan, also called the "See House", home of the Bishop of Kilmore.
- Bishop's Palace, Limerick, former home of the Bishop of Limerick
- Church of Ireland Bishop's Palace, Raphoe
- Archbishop's Palace, Tuam, built in 1678 and burnt in 1691; Grove House now stands on the site. Saint Jarlath's, built c. 1870, later served as archbishop's palace.
- Bishop's Palace Waterford, formerly home of the Bishop of Waterford and Lismore
- Archbishop's Palace, Armagh, formerly home of Archbishop of Armagh

There are also some Catholic bishops' palaces:

- Bishop's Palace, Ballina, County Mayo, home of the Catholic Bishop of Killala.
- Bishop's Palace, Cork, on Redemption Road, home of the Roman Catholic Bishop of Cork and Ross.
- Archbishop's Palace, Drumcondra, home of the Roman Catholic Archbishop of Dublin. It is today referred to as simply the Archbishop's House.
- Bishop's Palace, Longford, home of the Bishop of Ardagh and Clonmacnoise.
- Roman Catholic Bishop's Palace, Mullingar, dwelling of the Roman Catholic Bishop of Meath
- Roman Catholic Bishop's Palace, Raphoe
- Archbishop's Palace, Thurles, dwelling of the Catholic Archbishop of Cashel and Emly.

=== Italy ===
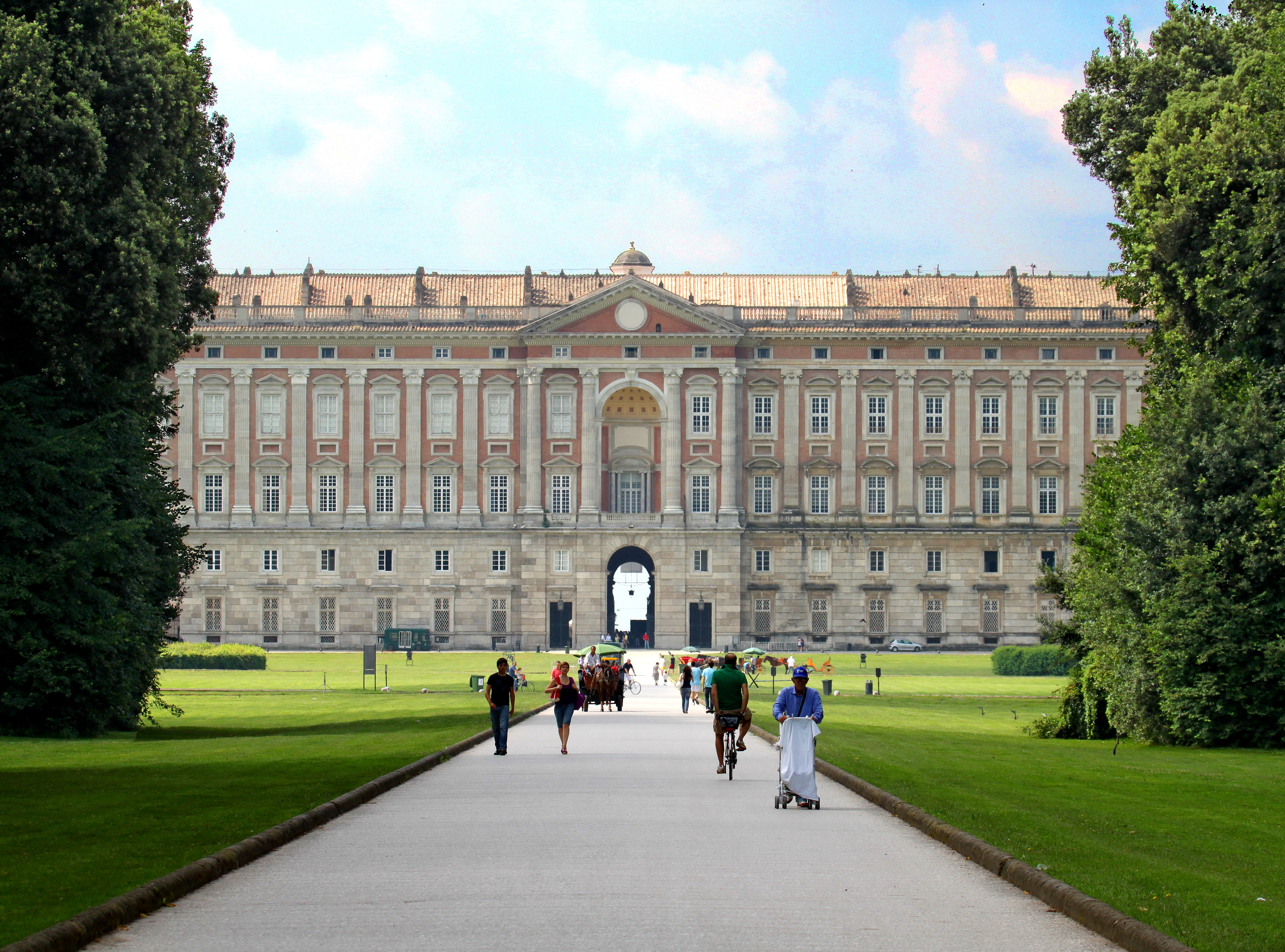
Royal Palace of Caserta is the largest former royal residence in the world.

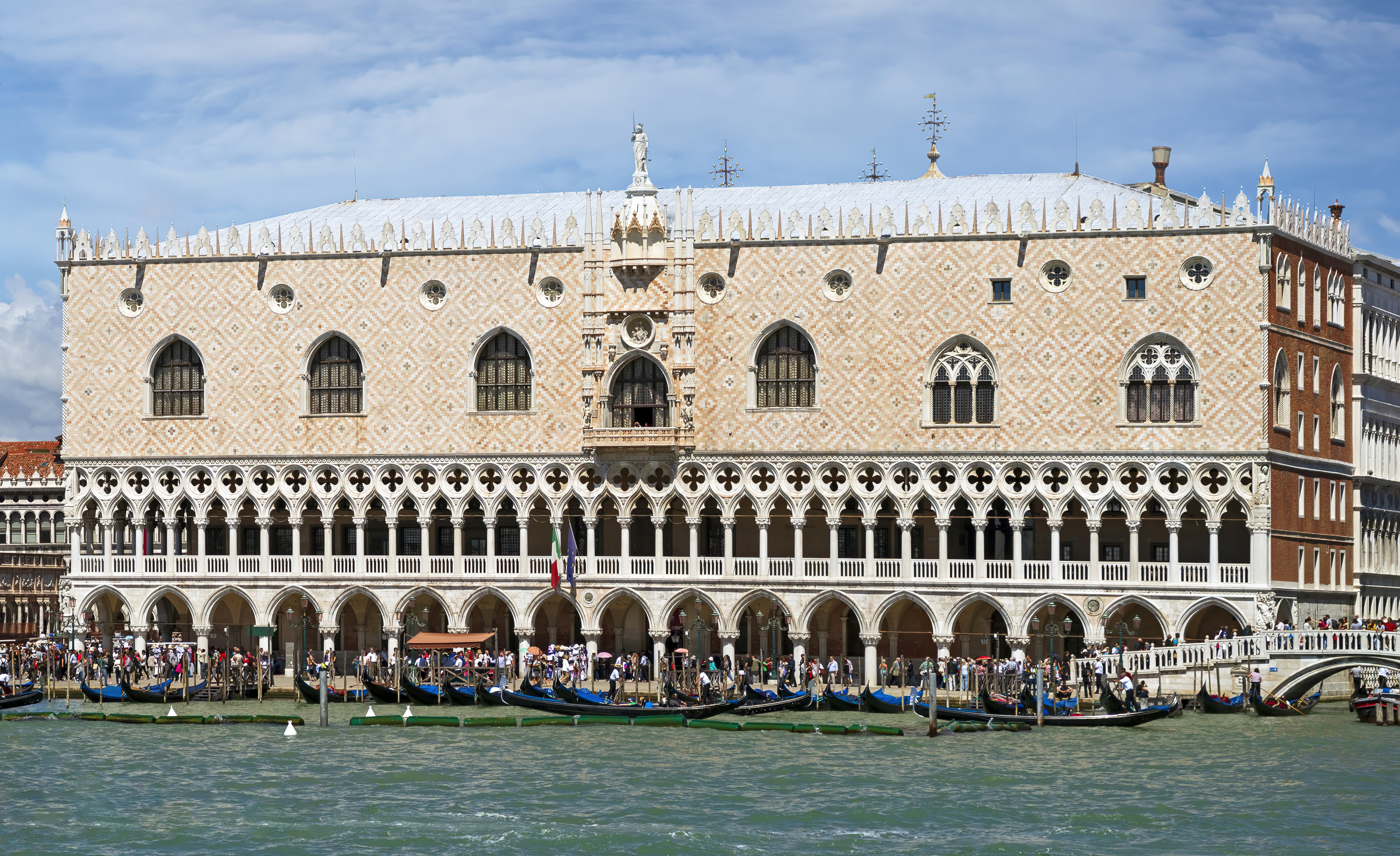
Doge's Palace, Venice. The palace included government offices, a jail, and the residence of the Doge of Venice, the elected authority of the former Republic of Venice

In Italy, any urban building built as a grand residence is a palazzo; these are often no larger than a Victorian townhouse. Being a nobleman was not necessary for one's house to be considered a palazzo, as the hundreds of palazzi in Venice nearly all belonged to the patrician class of the city. In the Middle Ages, these also functioned as warehouses and places of business, as well as homes. Each family's palazzo was a hive that contained all the family members, though it might not always show a grand architectural public front. In the 20th century, palazzo in Italian came to apply by extension to any large fine apartment building, as many old palazzi were converted to this use.

Bishops' townhouses were always palazzi, and the seat of a localized regime would also be so called. Many former capitals display a Ducal Palace, the seat of the local duke or lord. In Florence (just as for other strong communal governments), the seat of government was known as Palazzo della Signoria. When the Medici were made Grand Dukes of Tuscany, however, the centre of power shifted to their new residence in Palazzo Pitti, and the old centre of power began to be referred to as the Palazzo Vecchio.

Shops on the ground floor and flats at the top of a modern palazzo are not at all incongruous: historically, the ground floors of even a great family's palazzo could be trade and domestic offices often open to servants, tradesmen, customers and the public, while the smartest and most prestigious floor (known as the piano nobile) was kept for the family along with the upper floors and apartments, all of which were considered cleaner and safer than those on the ground floor. There were (and are) often separate, sometimes external, stairs to the humblest attic rooms and roofs used by the staff.

The most important royal palazzi in Italy are those in Caserta, Milan, Naples, Palermo, Turin, as well as the Quirinale Palace in Rome.

=== Malta ===
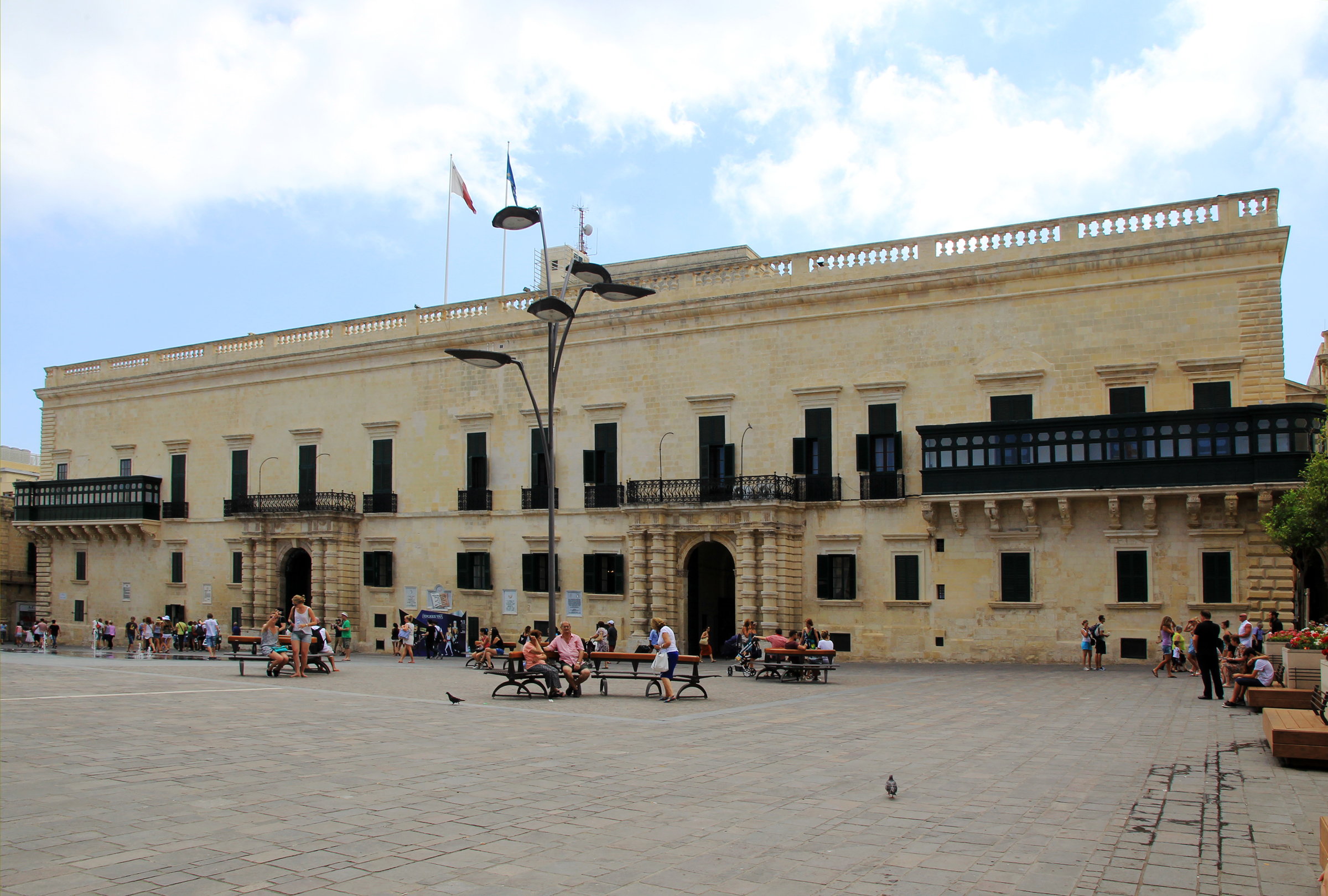
Grandmaster's Palace in Valletta

Until the sixteenth century, Malta was part of the Kingdom of Sicily, and the capital Mdina housed many palaces for the nobility, such as Palazzo Falson and Palazzo Santa Sofia. After the arrival of the Order of Saint John in 1530, the knights settled in Birgu, where part of Fort St Angelo was used as a palace for the Grand Master. The knights themselves lived in auberges, but these were more large houses rather than palaces.

When the Order began to build a new capital Valletta in 1566, a new Grandmaster's Palace and a series of new auberges were built. The auberges in Valletta are much larger than their counterparts in Birgu, and can be considered as palaces. The most important auberge still standing is Auberge de Castille, which currently houses the Office of the Prime Minister of Malta. Over the years, the Grand Masters also built a number of large residences in the countryside, such as Verdala Palace and San Anton Palace. Both of these now serve as official residences of the president of Malta.

The Archbishop of Malta has a palace in Mdina. The inquisitor also had a palace in Birgu and another in Girgenti until the abolition of the inquisition in 1798. The nobility, upper classes and individual knights of the Order built a number of private palaces, especially in Valletta, but also in the countryside. There are other palaces built by the nobility, such as, most notably Palazzo Parisio in Valletta and Palazzo Dragonara in St Julians.

=== Netherlands ===
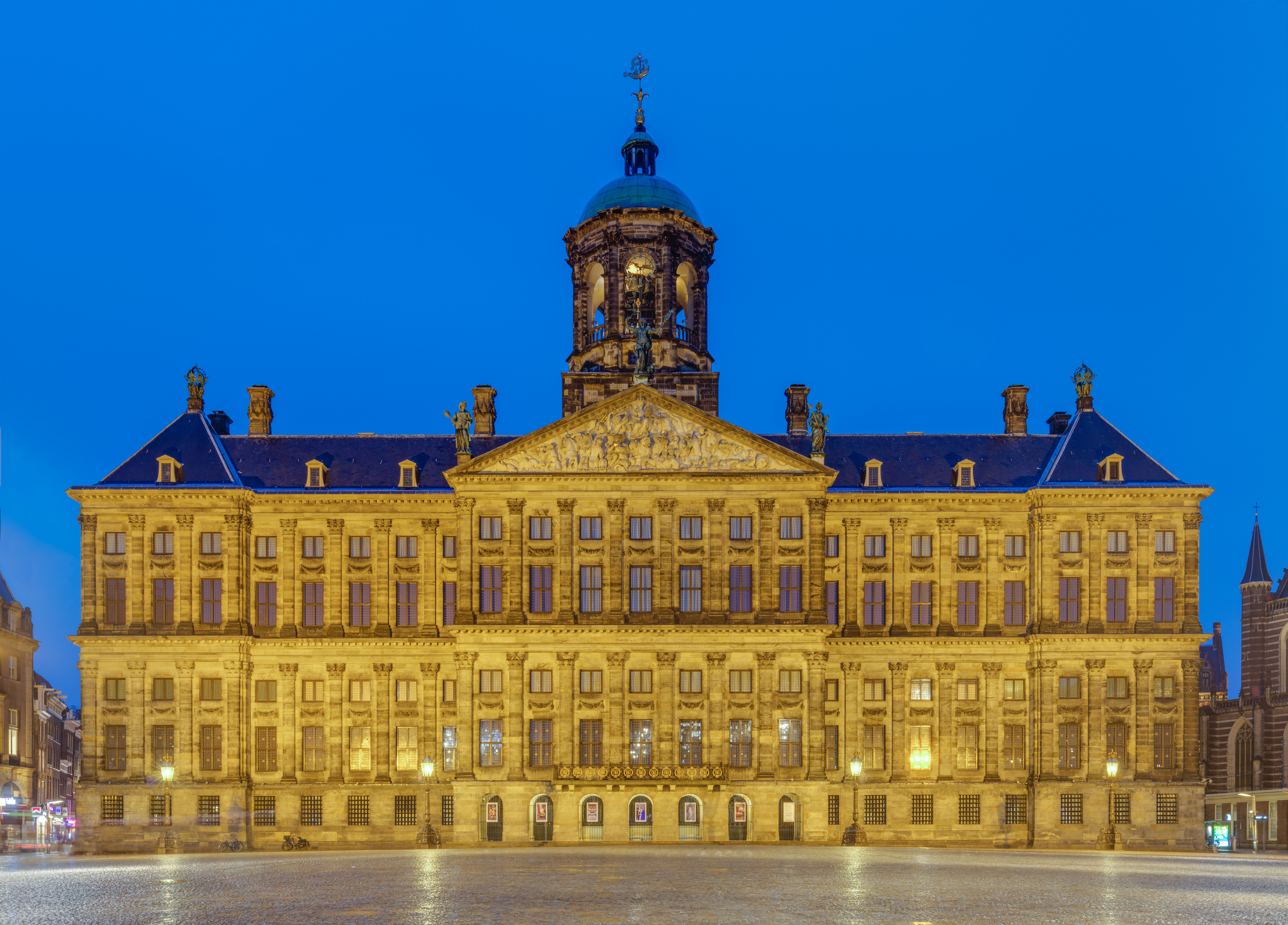
Royal Palace of Amsterdam in Amsterdam, Netherlands

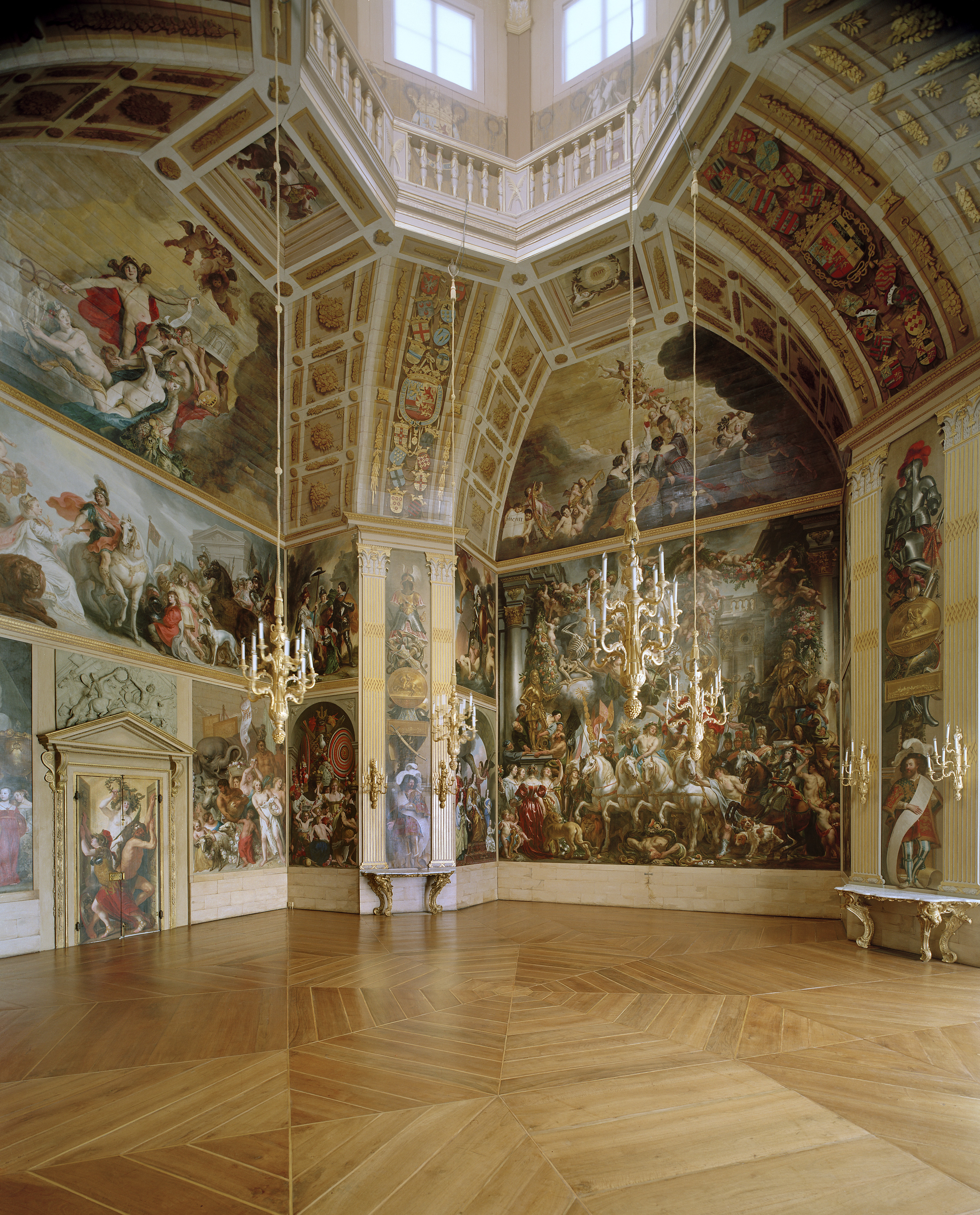
The Oranjezaal refers to a painted ballroom in the royal palace Huis ten Bosch in The Hague.

The Netherlands hosts several royal palaces that reflect its constitutional monarchy and a long-standing tradition of understated elegance. Dutch palaces tend to combine historical significance with functional design, often serving both ceremonial and administrative roles.

One of the most prominent is the Royal Palace of Amsterdam (Paleis op de Dam), located in the heart of the capital. Originally built in the 17th century as the city hall of Amsterdam during the Dutch Golden Age, it was later converted into a royal palace by King Louis Bonaparte, Napoleon’s brother, in 1808. Today, it serves as one of the three official palaces of the Dutch royal family and is used for state visits, award ceremonies, and royal events. Its Classical architecture and richly decorated interiors reflect the power and wealth of Amsterdam in its mercantile heyday.

In The Hague, the monarch's official workplace is Noordeinde Palace, a 16th-century building expanded over time to accommodate its current administrative role. Nearby lies Huis ten Bosch Palace, the current residence of King Willem-Alexander and his family. Built in 1645 for Prince Frederick Henry, the palace is renowned for the Oranjezaal, a grand hall decorated with allegorical paintings in honor of the prince.

Another important historical palace is Het Loo Palace, located in Apeldoorn. Constructed in the late 17th century for Stadtholder William III and Queen Mary II of England, the palace served as a royal summer residence for centuries. Now a national museum, it offers insights into the lifestyle and heritage of the House of Orange-Nassau, complete with restored Baroque gardens and staterooms.

Soestdijk Palace, once the residence of Queen Juliana and Prince Bernhard, and Drakensteyn Castle, a private estate formerly inhabited by Princess Beatrix, are also notable royal properties.

Some examples of dutch palaces are Binnenhof, Breda Castle, Duin en Kruidberg, Het Loo Palace, Het Oude Loo, Huis ten Bosch, Peace Palace, Villa Welgelegen, Royal Palace of Amsterdam, Noordeinde Palace and Soestdijk Palace.

=== Poland ===
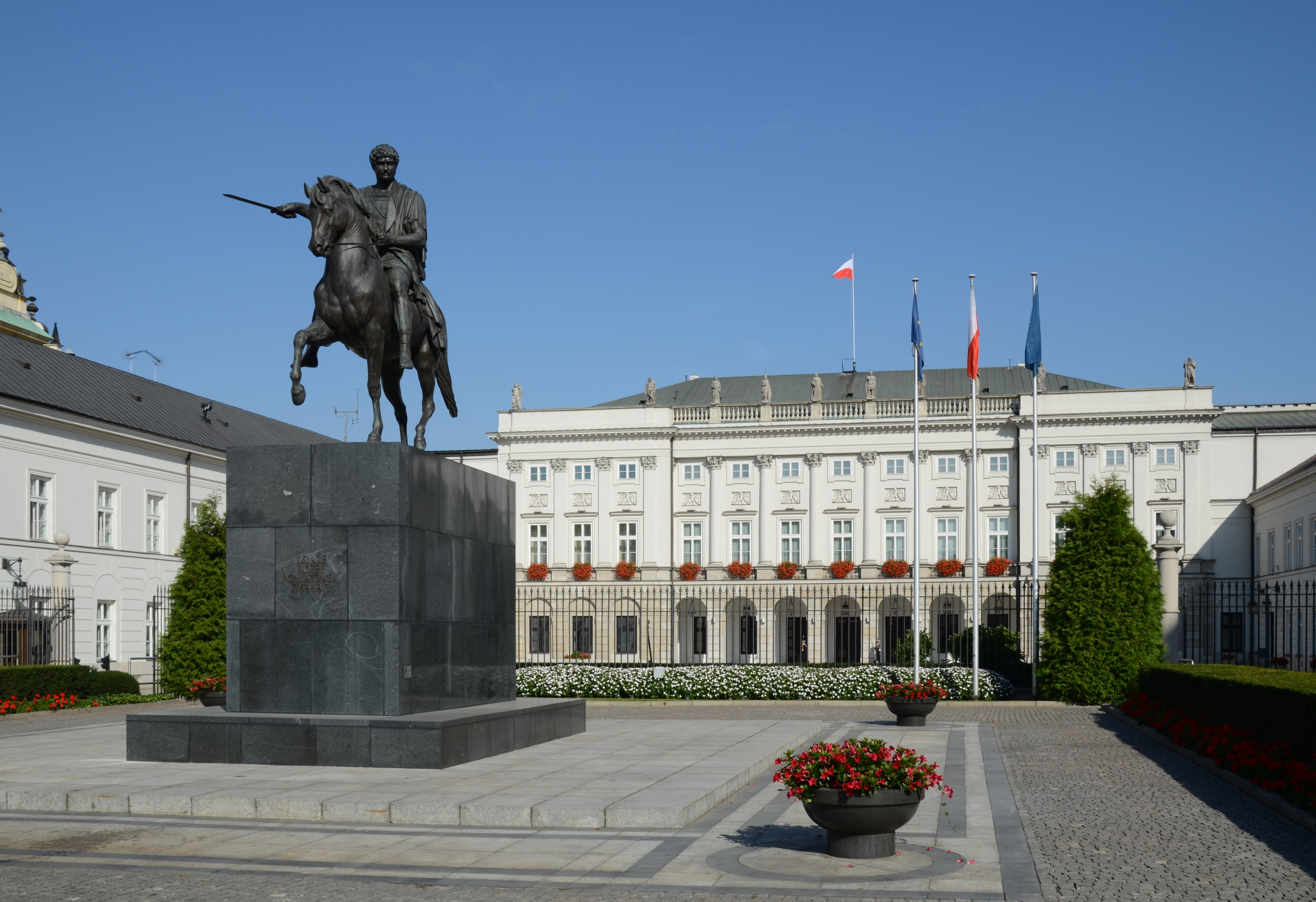
Presidential Palace in Warsaw, Poland

The former Kingdom of Poland, known as the Polish–Lithuanian Commonwealth, once spanned over 1,153,465 km^{2} (445,355 sq mi), which allowed the nobles to construct their residences anywhere from modern-day Poland to as far as southern Estonia. The Polish aristocracy (szlachta) greatly favoured Baroque and Rococo architecture of the period. Most notable architect specializing in those styles was Dutch-born Tylman van Gameren (also Tylman Gamerski), who designed several renowned palaces, for both kings and nobles, throughout the Commonwealth. Tylman also left behind a lifelong legacy of buildings that are regarded as gems of Polish Baroque architecture. His most famous works include Krasiński Palace and Łazienki Palace, both in Warsaw, and Branicki Palace in Białystok. Other palatial architects in Poland at the time were Chrystian Piotr Aigner, Szymon Bogumił Zug, Domenico Merlini and Johann Christian Schuch.

At present, Poland possesses hundreds of varied-style palaces and residences designed by architects from all over the world. Some best examples are Wilanów Palace, Presidential Palace, Oliwa Abbot's Palace, Copper-Roof Palace, Palace of the Ministry of Revenues and Treasury, Rogalin, Jabłonowski Palace, Zamoyski Palace in Kozłówka, Lanckoroński Palace in Kurozwęki, Nieborów Palace and the Palace in Otwock Wielki. There are also several palaces resembling castles or medieval Gothic residences, most notably Moszna Castle, Książ Castle and the Warsaw Royal Castle.

=== Portugal ===
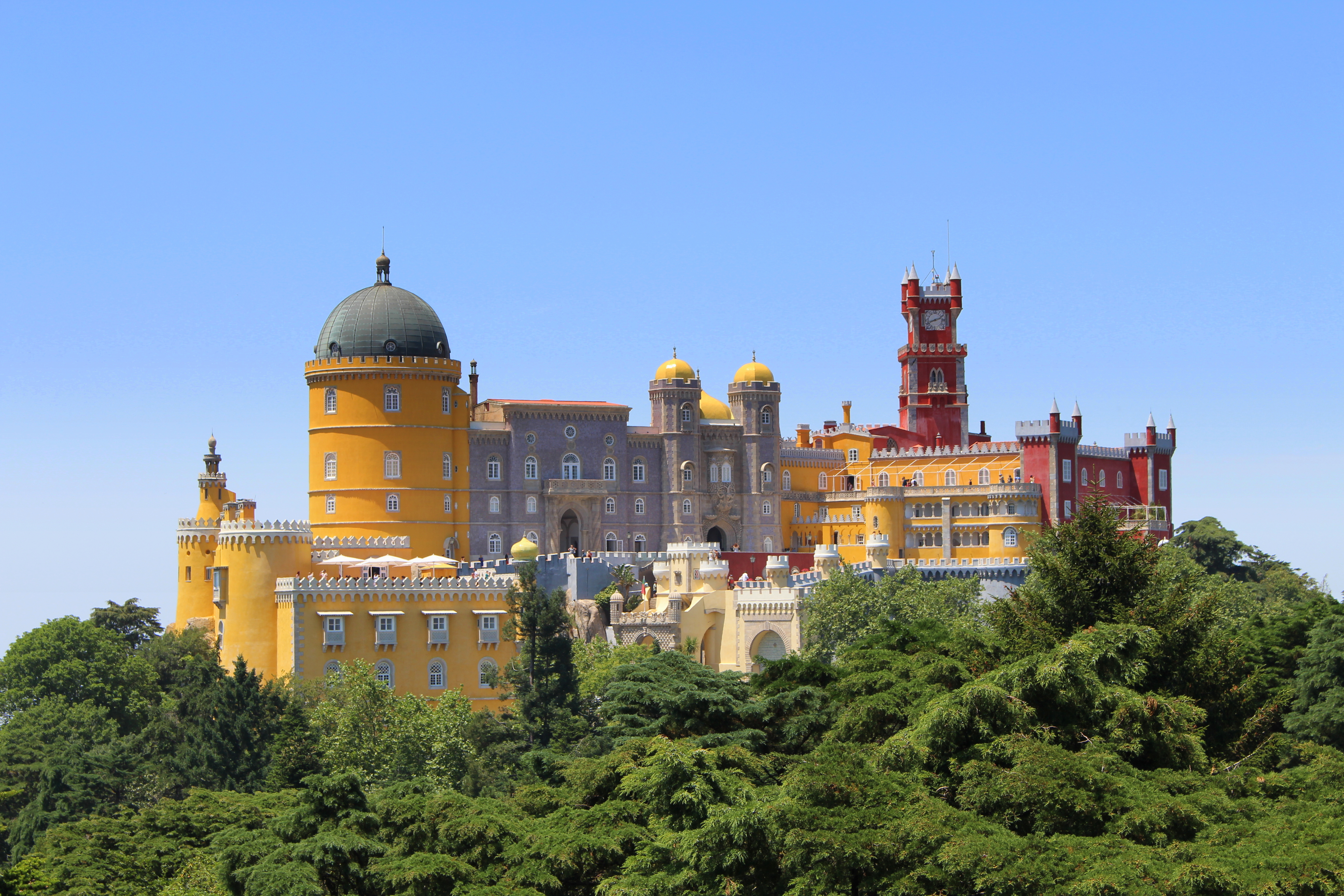
Pena Palace in Sintra, Portugal is the oldest palace inspired by European Romanticism.

Due to its relatively small geography, most of Portugal's palaces are former royal residences. Some examples of Portuguese palaces are Mafra National Palace, Pena National Palace, Belém Palace, Ajuda National Palace, Palácio das Necessidades, Mateus Palace, Palace Hotel of Bussaco, Palácio da Regaleira, and Palácio da Brejoeira.

=== Romania ===
Palace of the Parliament in Bucharest, Romania

Palaces in Romania, as elsewhere in Europe, were originally built for royalty, nobles and bishops. Three former royal palaces in Romania are the Cotroceni Palace (now the presidential residence); the Royal Palace in Bucharest, which now houses the National Museum of Art of Romania; and the Elisabeta Palace. Although Romania is no longer a constitutional monarchy, the current head of the former Romanian royal family, Princess Margareta of Romania, continues to reside at Elisabeta Palace in Bucharest.

Other palaces include the Crețulescu Palace in Bucharest, built for the Crețulescu family, and Peles palace, built by King Carol I of Romania as a royal residence.

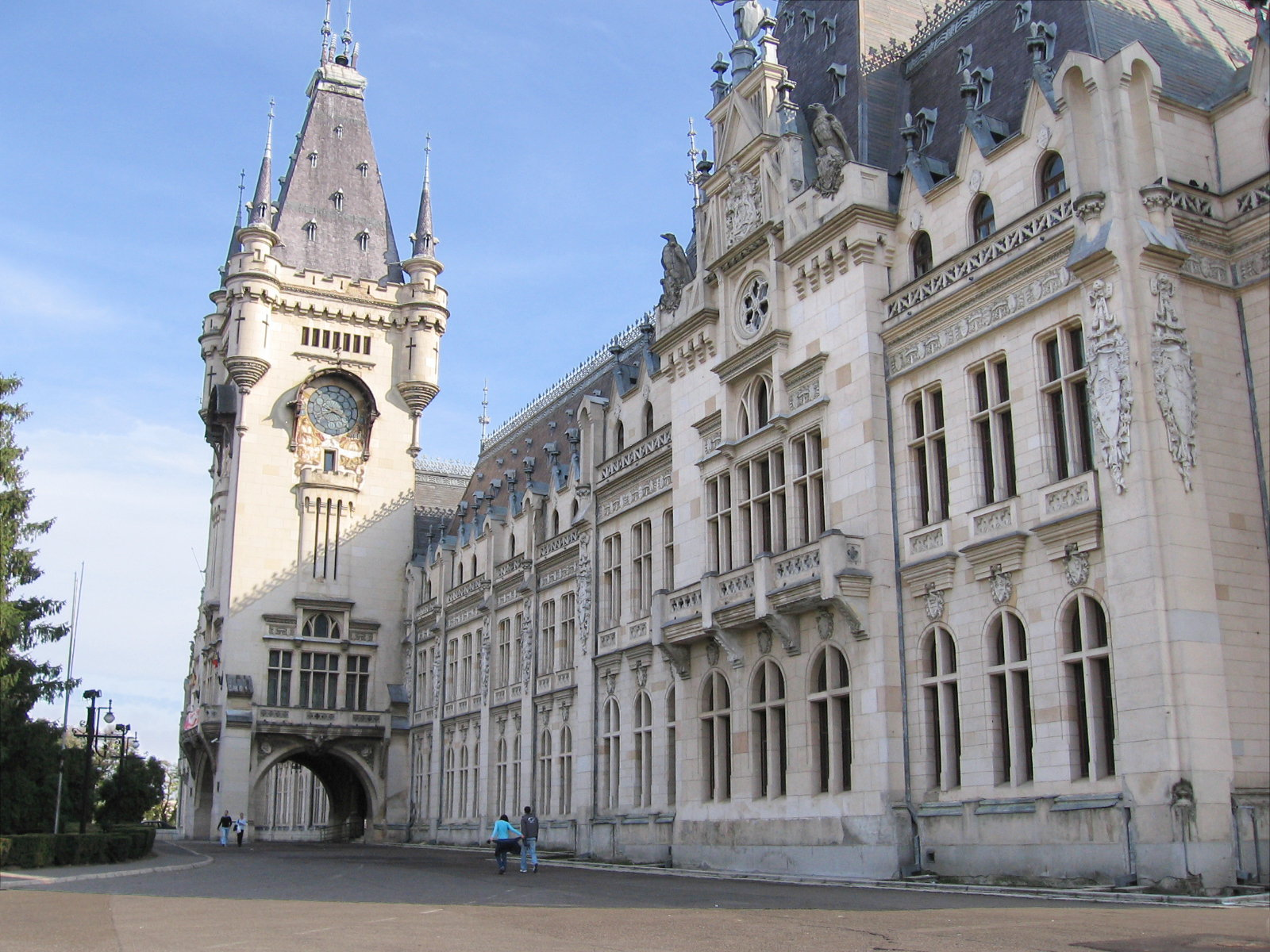
Built as a public administration centre, the Cultural Palace in Iasi looks royal, but was never the seat of royalty

The Palace of the Parliament (Casa Poporului) from Bucharest and the Palace of Culture in Iași (Palatul Culturii) are large government buildings, both purpose-built solely for government and public use.

=== Russia ===
The first palaces in Russia were built about a thousand years ago for the Grand Dukes of Kiev. These are not preserved, having been destroyed. Classical palaces were built during the reign of Tsar Peter the Great and his immediate successors. Russian palaces are generally categorized into Imperial Palaces and Grand Ducal Palaces. The former served as heavily guarded state residences housing ministerial offices, throne rooms, and official reception halls, while the latter functioned as private estates focused on social life, such as balls and salons, without the constraints of rigid state protocol.

Examples of Russian Imperial palaces include:

- the Winter Palace (1732–1917) in Saint Petersburg, was the official residence of the Russian monarchs
- the Grand Kremlin Palace (1837–1849) of the Moscow Kremlin in Moscow
- the Peterhof Palace (1709–1755) in Petergof
- the Catherine Palace (1857–1862) in Tsarskoye Selo
- the Gatchina Palace (1766–1781) in Gatchina
- the Alexander Palace (1792) in Tsarskoye Selo
- the Tsaritsyno Palace (1775) in Moscow
- the Livadia Palace (1911) in Crimea

Examples of Russian Grand Ducal palaces include:

- the Mariinsky Palace of Maria Nikolaevna
- the Vladimir Palace of Vladimir Alexandrovich
- the Constantine Palace of Konstantin Pavlovich
- the Mikhailovsky Palace of Michael Pavlovich
- the Marble Palace of Grigory Orlov
- the Oranienbaum of Alexander Menshikov
- the New Michael Palace of Michael Nikolaevich
- the Tauride Palace of Grigory Potemkin
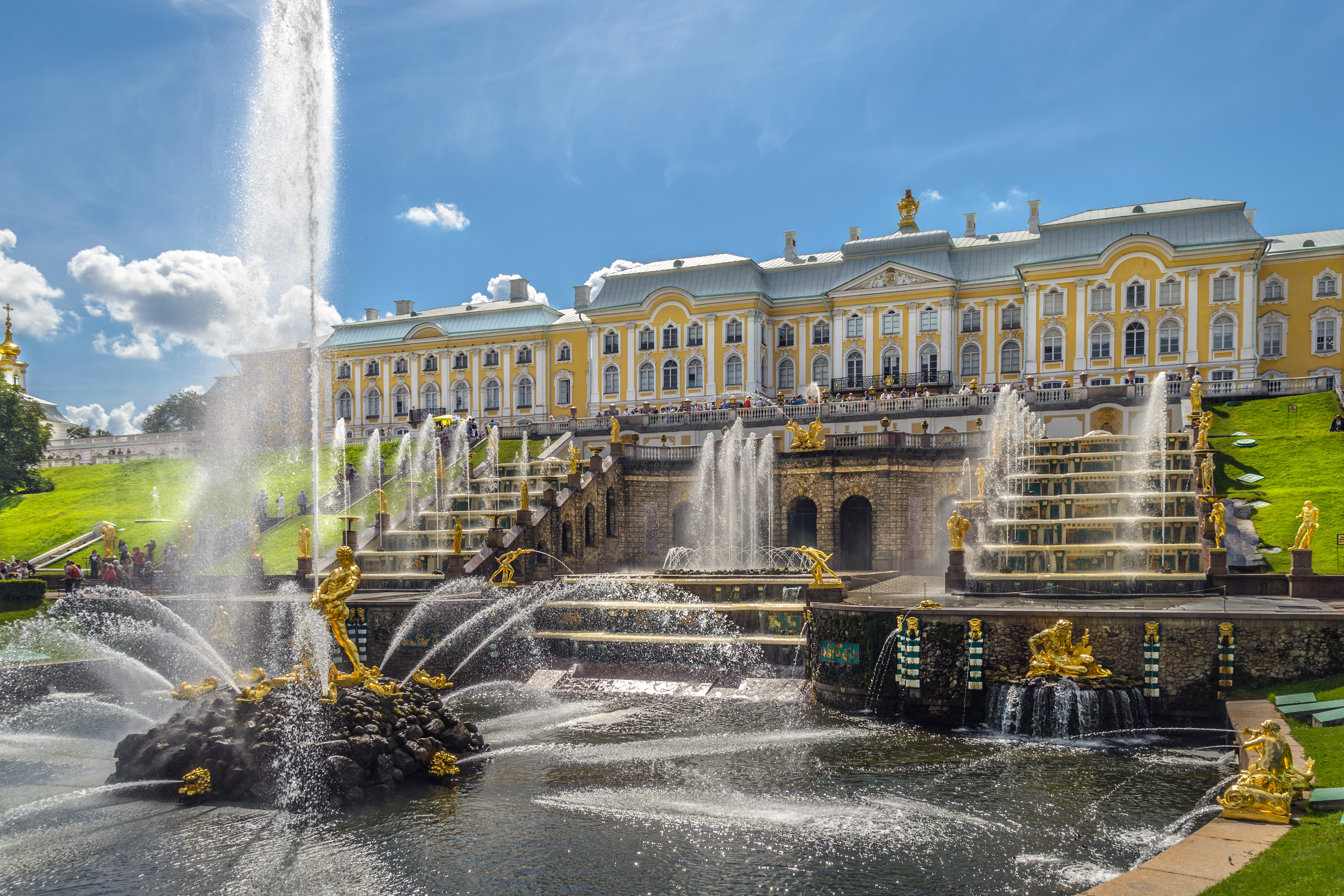
The Peterhof Palace

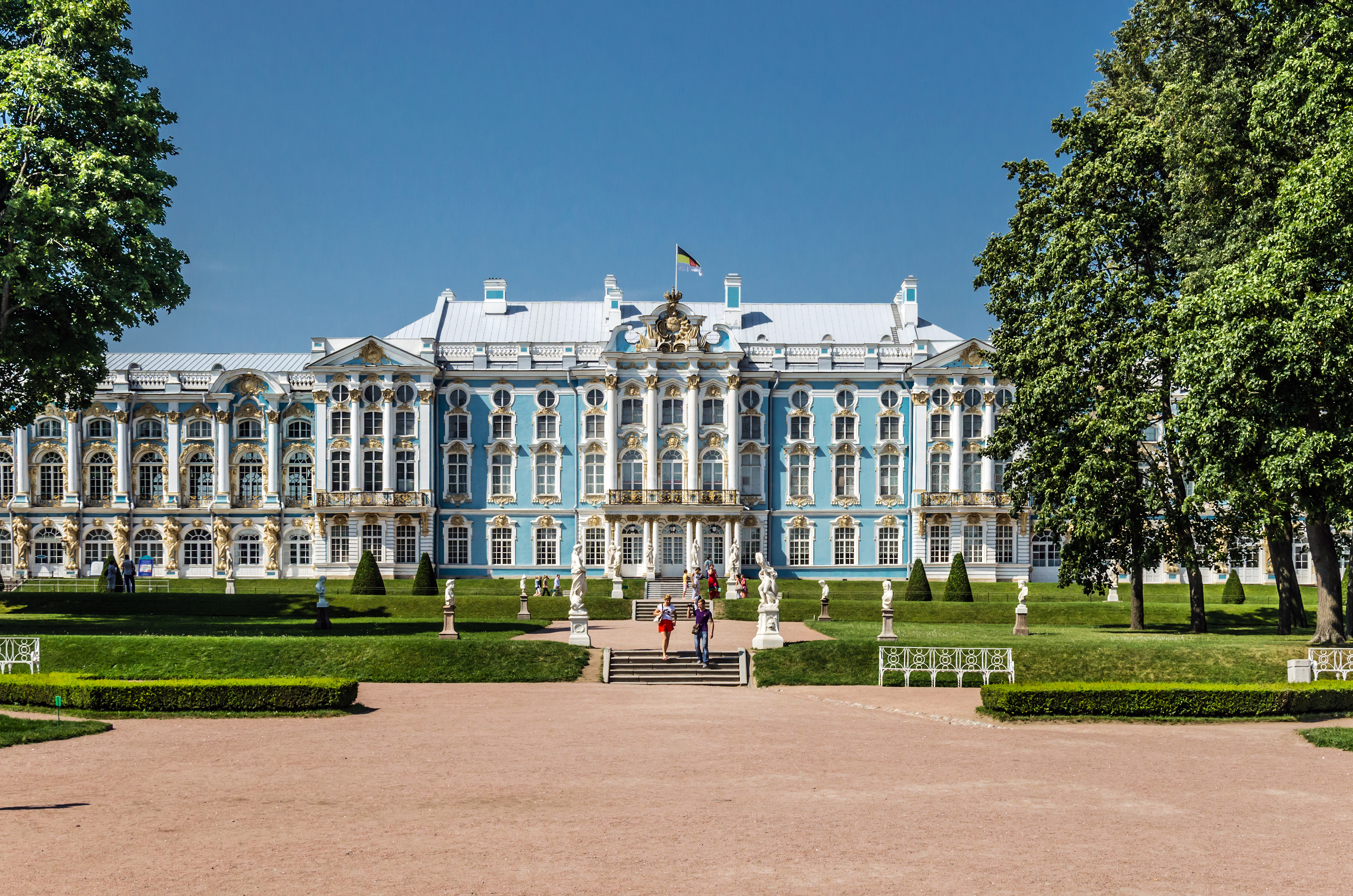
The Catherine Palace

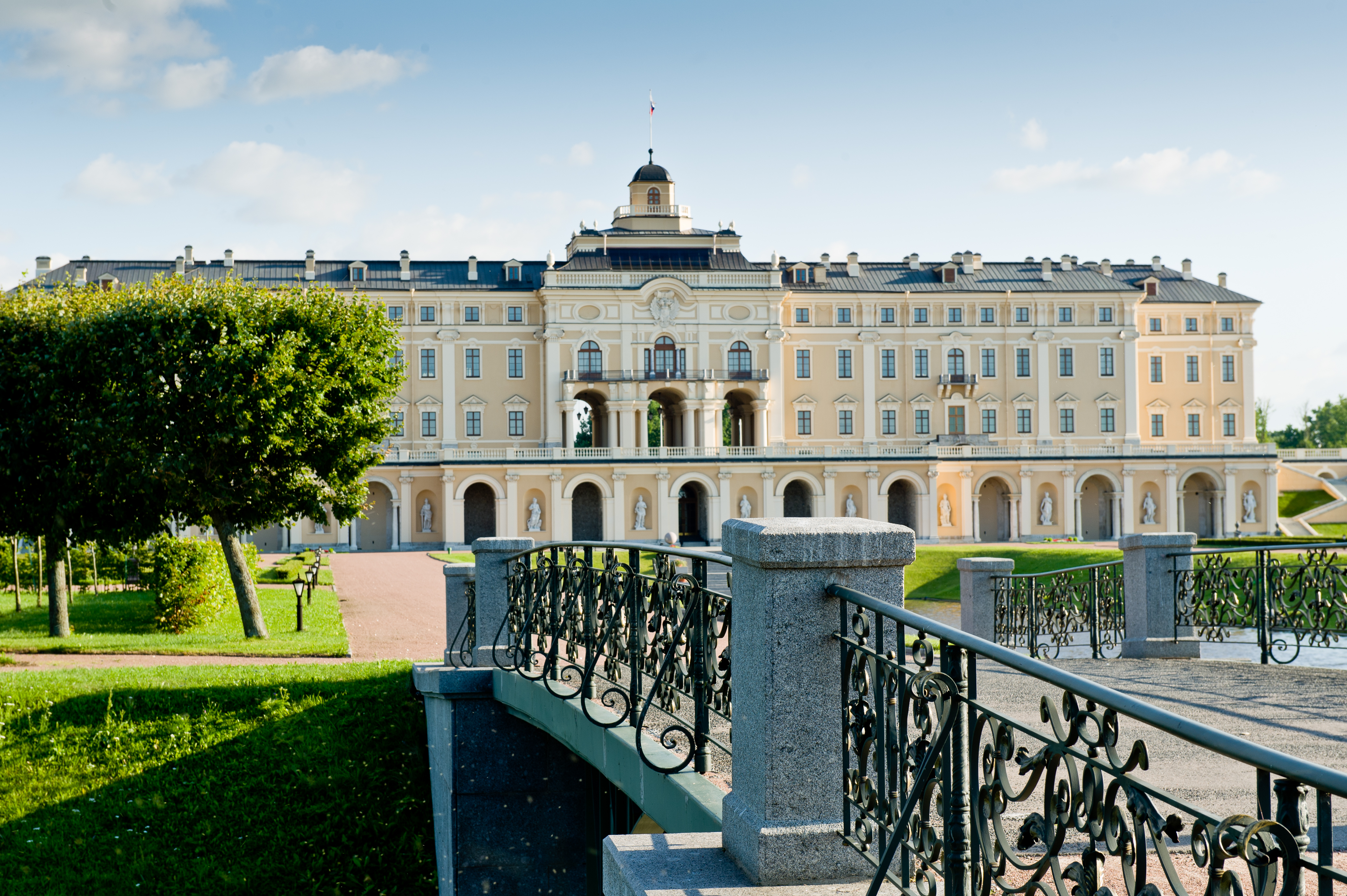
The Constantine Palace

=== Scandinavia ===
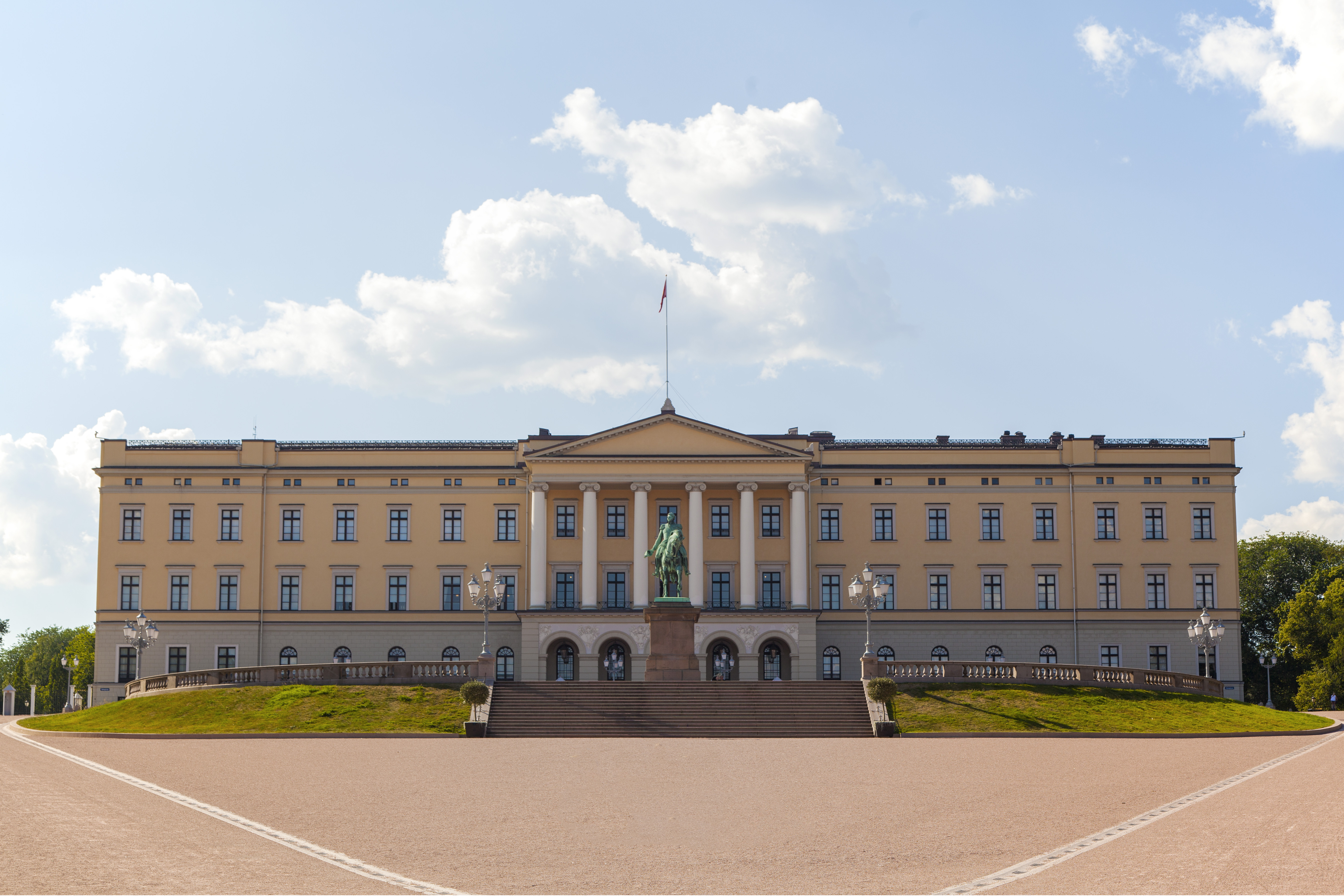
The Royal Palace, Oslo

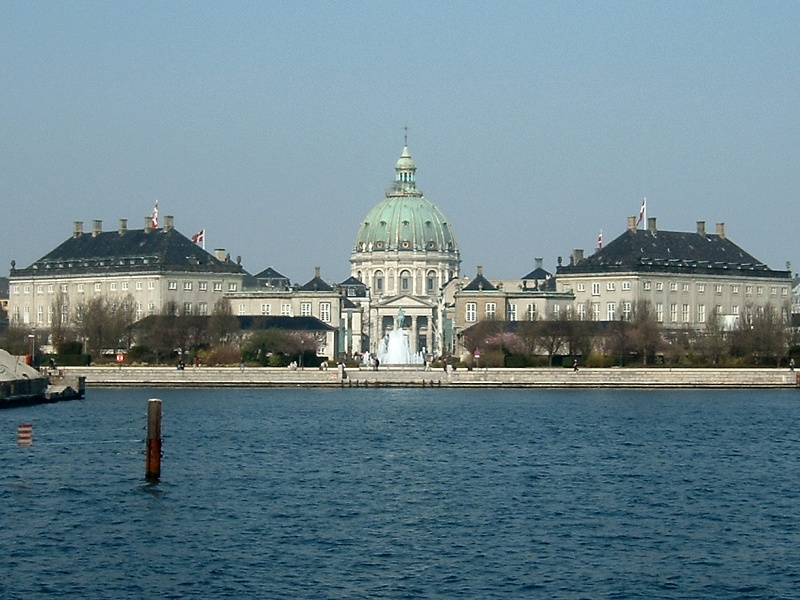
Amalienborg Palace, Copenhagen

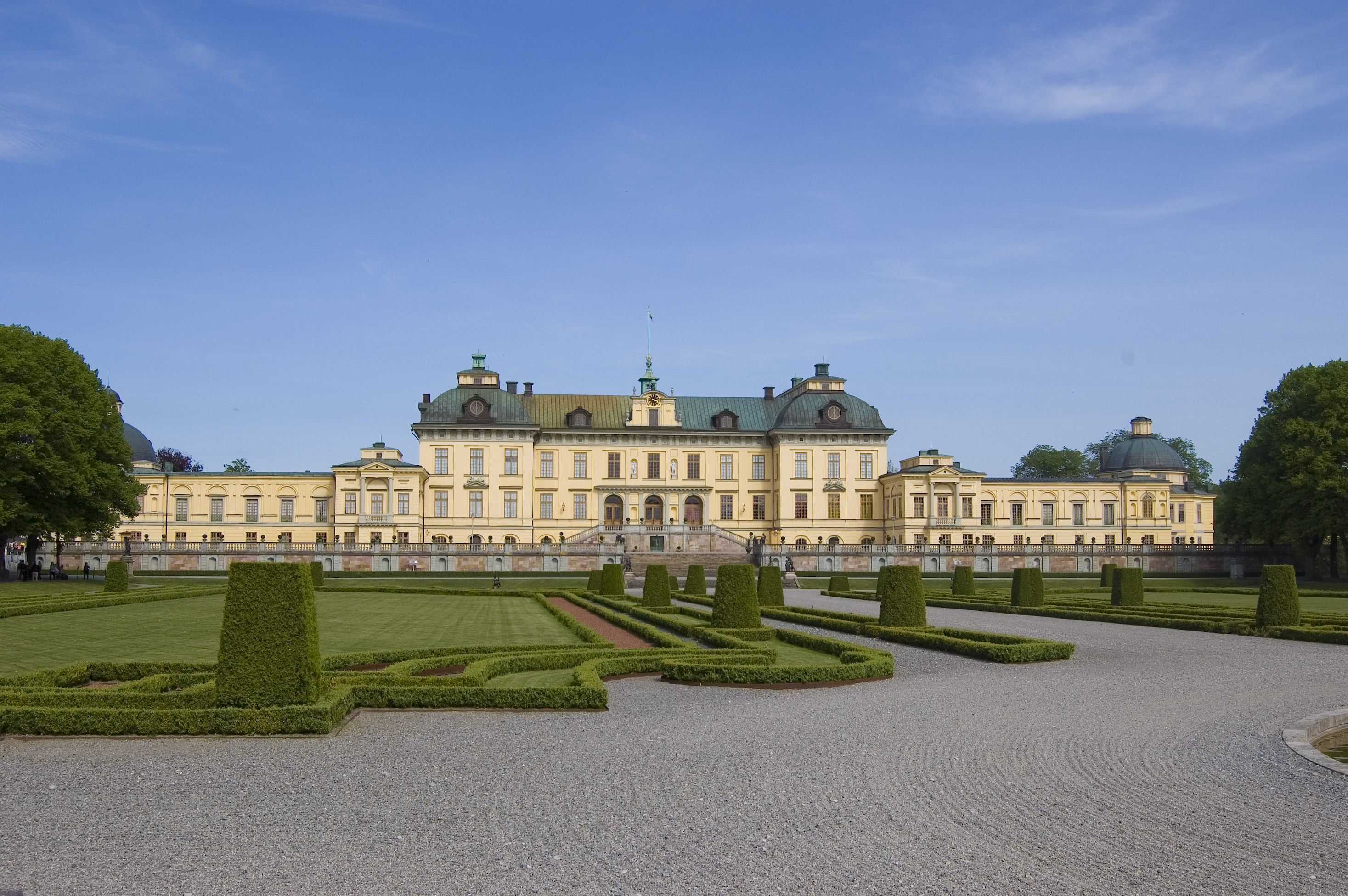
Drottningholm Palace, near Stockholm

The palaces where the Scandinavian monarchs reside.

The three Scandinavian countries of Denmark, Norway and Sweden all have long monarchic histories and possess several palaces. In Denmark Christiansborg Palace in Copenhagen was built as a royal palace, but is now only used for royal receptions; Amalienborg Palace has been the Danish royal residence since 1794. In Norway the Royal Palace in Oslo has been used as the royal residence since 1849. In Sweden the large Stockholm Palace was built in 1760, and remains the official royal residence, but at the current time is only used for official purposes while the Swedish royal family resides in the more modest Drottningholm Palace.

=== Serbia ===
The two dynasties of post-Ottoman Serbia, Karađorđević and Obrenović, built numerous royal residences throughout the country. The most prominent are to be found in the capital, Belgrade: the Stari Dvor and Novi Dvor (Old Palace and New Palace, respectively) in the downtown, and the Dedinje Royal Compound which includes the Kraljevski Dvor the Beli Dvor (Royal Palace and White Palace, respectively) in the suburb of Dedinje.

=== Spain ===
With over a thousand years of monarchic history, Spain has many palaces of its own that were built for different monarchs or nobles. Among these palaces is the Royal Palace of Madrid, also referred to as the Palacio Real. The palace is the largest palace in Europe with over 2,800 rooms but at the current time is of use for only governmental business while the royal family resides in the smaller Palacio de la Zarzuela.

In addition to the Royal Palace of Madrid, Alcázar of Seville (which mixes European Christian architectural styles with Moorish filigree), the Alhambra, the Monastery of San Lorenzo de El Escorial and the Royal Palace of Aranjuez, fine baroque palace is surrounded by gardens. As of 2026, the royal family and prime minister live in the Palace of Zarzuela and Palace of Moncloa, respectively.

=== Turkey ===
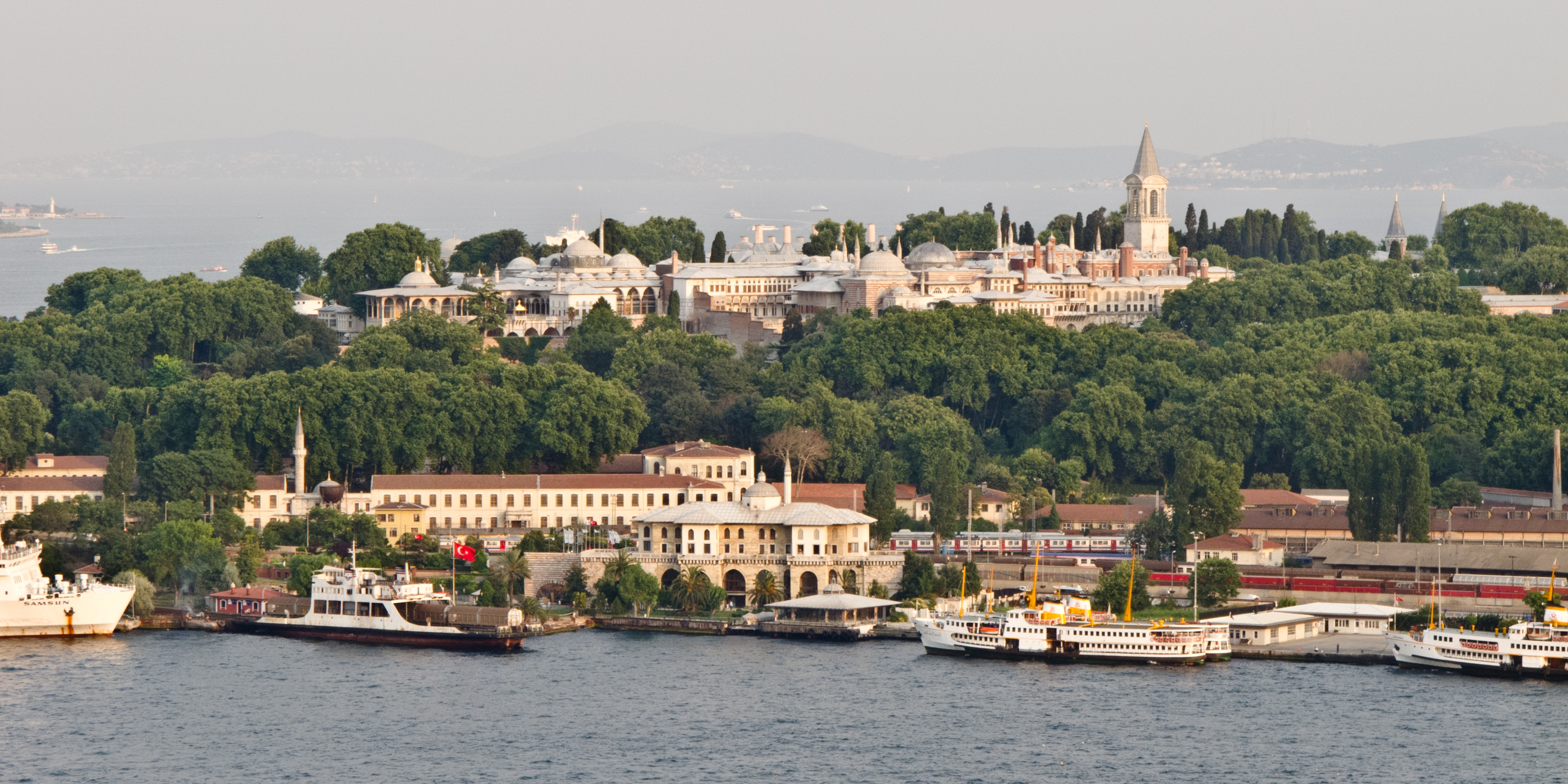
Topkapı Palace complex, Istanbul

The enormous Topkapı Palace complex in Istanbul was begun in 1459, and with its many additions survived almost completely intact until it was turned into a museum in 1923. It was the centre of government as well as the residence of the Ottoman Caliphs. It combined aspects of the typical Asian form of a group of pavilions set in a large walled garden (part is now Gülhane Park) with the European style of a single massive building with courtyards. Visitors passed through a series of courtyards, originally lined with hundreds of soldiers along the arcades, with only the most important or favoured reaching the Fourth Courtyard and the imperial residential quarters.

By the 19th century Topkapı was largely abandoned as a residence in favour of the new Dolmabahçe Palace and Yıldız Palace, as well as smaller Ottoman palaces in Istanbul, some summer retreats and the like. These were in essentially European architectural styles.

=== United Kingdom ===
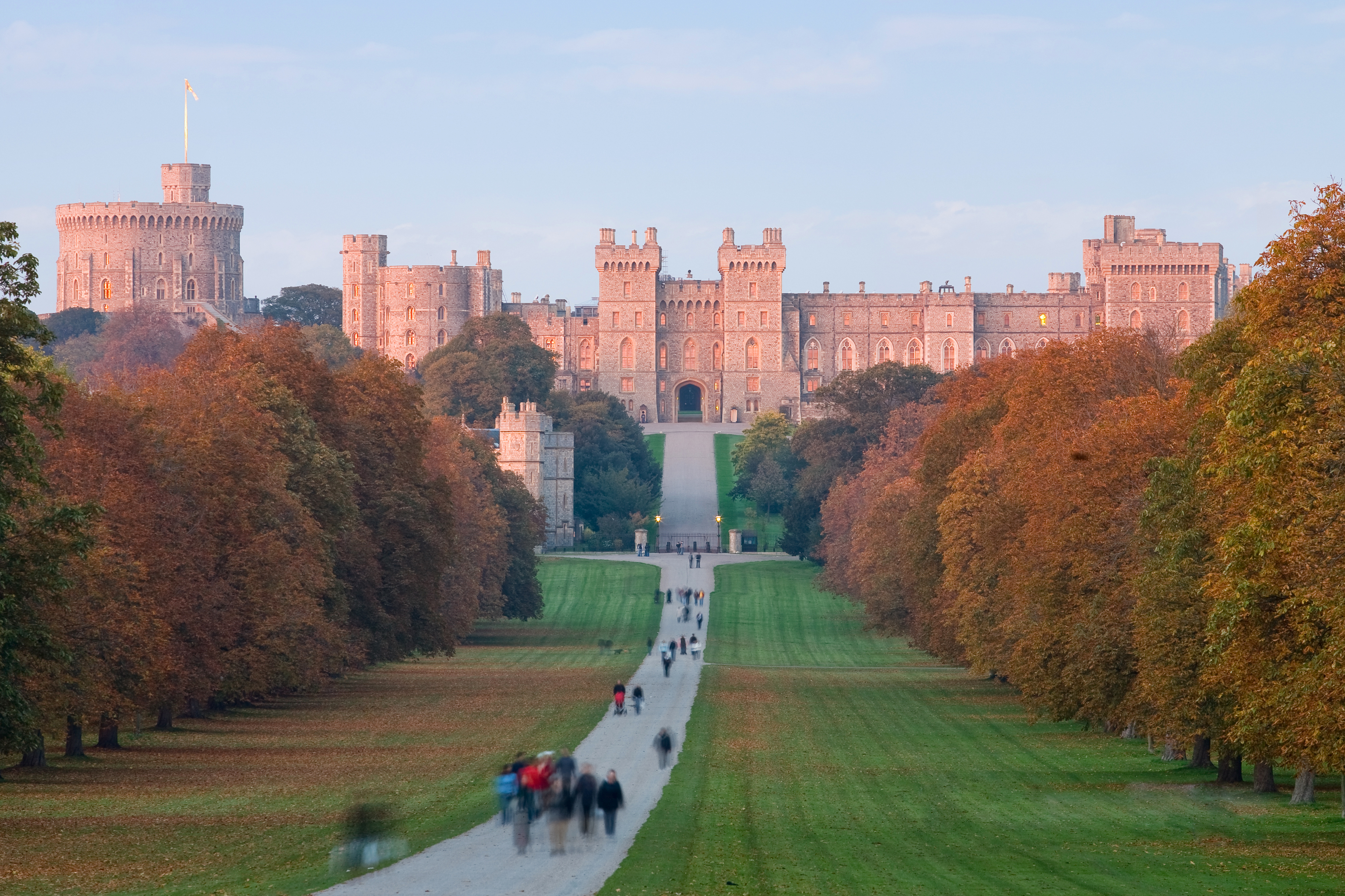
Windsor Castle

Although many English country houses can be called "palatial" in size and the richness of their contents, in the United Kingdom, by tacit agreement, the word "palace" is reserved for official residences (present or former) of the royal family or bishops, regardless of whether located in town or country. However, not all palaces use the term in their name – see Windsor Castle. Thus the Palace of Beaulieu gained its name precisely when Thomas Boleyn sold it to Henry VIII in 1517. Previously, it had been known as Walkfares, but like several other palaces including Hampton Court Palace, the name stuck even once the royal connection ended.

Blenheim Palace was built, on a different site, in the grounds of the disused royal Palace of Woodstock, and the name was also part of the extraordinary honour when the house was given by a grateful nation to a great general, the Duke of Marlborough. Along with several royal and episcopal palaces in the countryside, Blenheim does demonstrate that "palace" has no specific urban connotation in English. On the use of the term "palace" in the UK, Buckingham Palace was known as Buckingham House before it was acquired by the monarchy.

Blenheim Palace (in England) and Hamilton Palace (in Scotland, demolished in 1927) are the only non-royal and non-episcopal residences to have the word "palace" in their name, other than Dalkeith Palace in Scotland, which used to be the seat of the Dukes of Buccleuch (who descend from Charles II of England).

=== Other ===
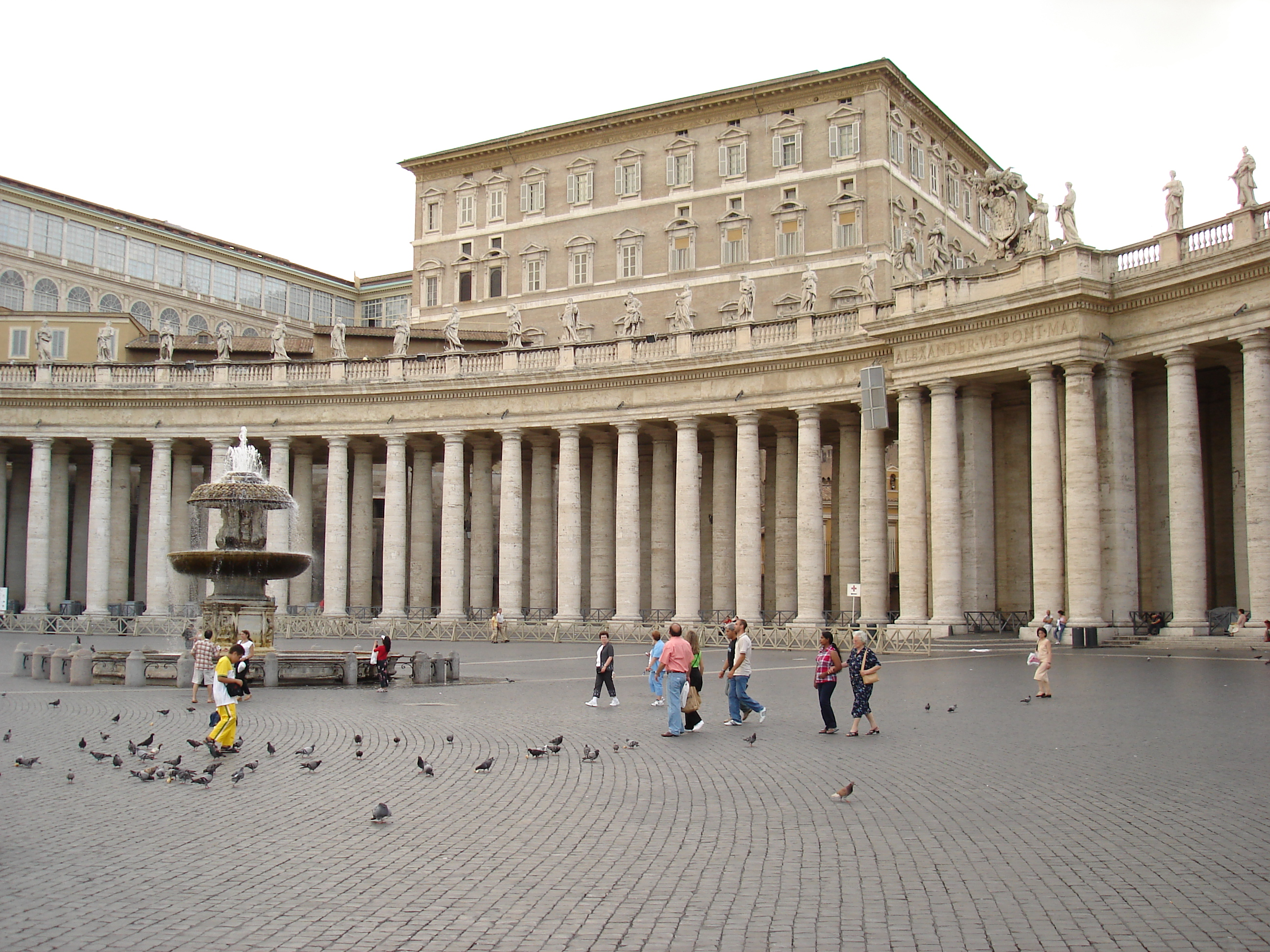
Apostolic Palace

In continental Europe royal and episcopal palaces were not merely residences; the clerks who administered the realm or the diocese laboured there as well. (To this day many bishops' palaces house both their family apartments and their official offices.) However, unlike the "Palais du Justice" which is often encountered in the French-speaking world, modern British public administration buildings are never called "palaces"; although the formal name for the "Houses of Parliament" is the Palace of Westminster, this reflects Westminster's former role as a royal residence and centre of administration.

In more recent years, the word has been used in a more informal sense for other large, impressive buildings, such as The Crystal Palace of 1851 (an immensely large, glazed hall erected for The Great Exhibition) and modern arenas-convention centers like Alexandra Palace.

The largest in the world is the Palace of the Parliament in Bucharest, Romania. Built during the socialist regime, no effort or expense was spared to raise this colossal neo-classic building.

== See also ==
- Archbishop's Palace (disambiguation)
- Castle
- Great house
- Imperial castle (Reichsburg)
- Kaiserpfalz (or Königspfalz)
- List of palaces
- Manor house
- Official residence
- Palas
- Palatine Hill
- Real estate
- World's largest palace
