= List of royal palaces =

This is a list of royal palaces, sorted by continent.

== Africa ==
Residence	Photo	City	Function	Link
Egypt
Abdin Palace		Cairo		
Al-Gawhara Palace		Cairo		
Koubbeh Palace		Cairo		
Tahra Palace		Cairo		
Ethiopia
Menelik Palace		Addis Abeba		
Jubilee Palace		Addis Abeba		
Guenete Leul Palace		Addis Abeba		
Eritrea
Imperial Palace		Massawa		
Eswatini
Ludzidzini Royal Village		Lobamba		
Lozitha Palace		Mbabane		
Lesotho
Royal Palace		Maseru		
Libya
Royal Palace of Tripoli		Tripoli		
Al Manar Palace		Benghazi		
Morocco
Dar al-Makhzen		Rabat		
Dar al-Makhzen		Fez		
Bahia Palace		Marrakesh		
Dar al-Makhzen		Tangier		
El Badi Palace		Marrakesh		
Nigeria
Royal Palace of the Oba of Benin		Benin City		
Olowo of Owo's Palace		Owo		
Alaafin of Oyo's Palace		Oyo		
Sultan of Sokoto's Palace		Sokoto		
King Jaja of Opobo Palace		Opobo		
Rwanda
Rwesero Palace		Nyanza		
Tanzania
Sultan's Palace		Stone Town		
Tunisia
Bardo Palace		Tunis		
Carthage Royal Palace		Tunis		
Rose Palace		Tunis		
Ksar Saïd Palace		Tunis		
Uganda
Mengo Palace/Lubiri		Kampala		
Karuziika Palace		Karuziika		
Kyabazinga Palace		Kyabazinga		

== Americas ==
Residence	Photo	City	Function	Link
Brazil
Imperial Palace		Rio de Janeiro		
Palace of São Cristóvão		Rio de Janeiro		
Palace of Petrópolis		Petrópolis		
Palace of Grão-Pará		Petrópolis		
Palace of Santa Cruz		Rio de Janeiro		
Canada
Rideau Hall		Ottawa, Ontario		
La Citadelle		Quebec City, Quebec		
Government House (British Columbia)		Victoria, British Columbia		
Government House (Manitoba)		Winnipeg, Manitoba		
Government House (Newfoundland and Labrador)		St. John's, Newfoundland and Labrador		
Government House (Nova Scotia)		Halifax, Nova Scotia		
Government House (Prince Edward Island)		Charlottetown, Prince Edward Island		
Government House (Saskatchewan)		Regina, Saskatchewan		
Government House (New Brunswick)		Fredericton, New Brunswick		
Mexico
Palace of Iturbide		Mexico City		
National Palace		Mexico City		
Castle of Chapultepec		Mexico City		
Haiti
Sans-Souci Palace		Milot		
United States
ʻIolani Palace		Honolulu		

== Asia ==
Residence	Photo	City	Function	Link
Afghanistan
Arg		Kabul		
Tajbeg Palace		Kabul		
Azerbaijan
Palace of Nakhchivan Khans		Nakhchivan		
Palace of Shaki Khans		Shaki		
Palace of the Shirvanshahs		Baku		
Togh's Melikian Palace		Tuğ		
Palace of Ganja Khans		Ganja		
Palace of Karabakh Khans		Shusha		
Bangladesh
Lalbagh Fort		Dhaka		
Boro Kotro		Dhaka		
Ahsan Manzil		Dhaka		
Bhutan
Dechencholing Palace		Thimphu		
Samteling Palace		Thimphu		
Thruepang Palace		Trongsa District		
Brunei
Istana Nurul Iman		Bandra Seri Begawan		
Istana Darussalam		Bandra Seri Begawan		
Istana Darul Hana		Bandra Seri Begawan		
Istana Banderung Kayangan		Bandra Seri Begawan		
Istana Edinburgh		Bandra Seri Begawan		
Istana Kampong Ayer		Bandra Seri Begawan		
Istana Nurul Izzah		Jerudong		
Istana Pantai		Tutong		
Istana Kota Manggalela		Kuala Belait		
Cambodia
Royal Palace of Cambodia		Phnom Penh		
The Royal Residence		Siem Reap		
The Royal Palace		Angkor Thom		
China
Epang Palace		Xi'an		
Weiyang Palace		Xi'an		
Daming Palace		Xi'an		
Huaqing Pool		Xi'an		
Luoyang Palace		Luoyang		
Shangyang Palace		Luoyang		
Forbidden City		Beijing		
Zhongnanhai		Beijing		
Beihai Park		Beijing		
Summer Palace		Beijing		
Old Summer Palace		Beijing		
Ming Palace		Nanjing		
Taicheng		Nanjing		
Mukden Palace		Shenyang		
Potala Palace		Lhasa		
India
Bella Vista		Hyderabad		
Chowmahalla Palace		Hyderabad		
City Palace		Jaipur		
City Palace		Udaipur		
Falaknuma Palace		Hyderabad		
Hill Palace		Cochin		
King Kothi Palace		Hyderabad		
Kowdiar Palace		Trivandrum		
Lake Palace		Udaipur		
Mysore Palace		Mysore		
Rambagh Palace		Jaipur		
Sardar Mahal		Hyderabad		
Padmanabhapuram Palace		Padmanabhapuram		
Umaid Bhawan Palace		Jodhpur		
Ujjayanta Palace		Agartala		
Jai Vilas Mahal		Gwalior		
Amar Mahal		Jammu		
Victor Jubilee Palace		Cooch Behar		
Hazarduari Palace		Murshidabad		
Jhargram Palace		Jhargram		
Gajlaxmi Palace		Dhenkanal		
Indonesia
Maimun Palace		North Sumatra		
Niat Palace		North Sumatra		
Niat Lima Laras Palace		North Sumatra		
Kuto Lamo Palace		South Sumatra		
Pagaruyung Palace		West Sumatra		
Silinduang Bulan Palace		West Sumatra		
Siak Palace,		Riau		
Pahlawan Palace (Sayap Palace)		Riau		
Asher Ayah Al-Hashemite Palace		Riau		
Sultanate Palace Indragiri		Riau		
Kadriyah Sultan's Palace		West Kalimantan		
Kutai Sultan's Palace		East Kalimantan		
Sambaliung Palace		East Kalimantan		
Datu Luwu Palace (Polopo Palace)		South Sulawesi		
Bola Soba		South Sulawesi		
Balla Lompoa Palace (Tamalate Palace)		South Sulawesi		
Buton Palace		Southeast Sulawesi		
Kraton Ngayogyakarta Hadiningrat		Yogyakarta		
Taman Sari Water Castle		Yogyakarta		
Kraton Surakarta Hadiningrat		Central Java		
Pura Mangkunegaran		Central Java		
Keraton Kasepuhan		West Java		
Ternate Sultan's Palace		North Maluku		
Bima Palace		West Nusa Tenggara		
Dalam Loka Palace		West Nusa Tenggara		
Tirta Gangga Water Palace		Bali		
Klungkung Palace		Bali		
Ubud Palace		Bali		
Ujung Water Palace		Bali		
Tampaksiring Palace		Bali		
Iran
Ālī Qāpū		Isfahan		
Behistun Palace		Kermanshah		
Golestan Palace		Tehran		
Pearl Palace		Mehrshahr		
Marble Palace		Tehran		
Niavaran Palace Complex		Tehran		
Sa'dabad Palace Complex		Tehran		
Apadana Palace		Marvdasht		
Israel
Royal Palace, Tell el-Ful		Beit Hanina		
Japan
Heijō Palace		Nara		
Heian Palace		Kyoto		
Tokyo Imperial Palace		Tokyo		
Kyoto Imperial Palace		Kyoto		
Tōgū Palace		Tokyo		
Akasaka Palace		Tokyo		
Shuri Castle		Naha		
Jordan
Raghadan Palace		Amman		
Zahran Palace		Amman		
North Korea
Anhak Palace		Pyongyang		
Manwoldae		Kaesong		
South Korea
Banwolseong		Gyeongju		
Donggung Palace and Wolji Pond		Gyeongju		
Gyeongbokgung		Seoul		
Changdeokgung		Seoul		
Changgyeonggung		Seoul		
Gyeonghuigung		Seoul		
Deoksugung		Seoul		
Hwaseong Hanggung Palace		Suwon		
Namhansan Hanggung Palace		Namhansanseong		
Laos
Plumeria		Luang Prabang		
Royal Palace Museum		Luang Prabang		
Xiengkeo Palace		Luang Prabang		
Malaysia
Istana Negara, Jalan Istana		Kuala Lumpur		
Istana Negara, Jalan Duta		Kuala Lumpur		
The Astana		Sarawak		
Istana Abu Bakar		Pekan		
Istana Alam Shah		Klang		
Istana Anak Bukit		Kedah		
Istana Besar		Johor Bahru		
Istana Iskandariah		Kuala Kangsar		
Istana Maziah		Kuala Terengganu		
Istana Besar Seri Menanti		Seri Menanti		
Istana		Arau		
Istana		Kota Bharu		
Istana Ampang Tinggi		Negeri Sembilan		
Istana Bandar		Jugra		
Istana Besar		Johor Bahru		
Istana Bukit Kayangan		Shah Alam		
Istana Bukit Serene		Johor Bahru		
Istana Darul Ehsan		Putrajaya		
Istana Jahar		Kota Bharu		
Istana Melawati		Putrajaya		
Istana Pasir Pelangi		Johor Bahru		
Istana Perlis,		Kuala Lumpur		
Istana Satu		Kuala Terengganu		
Istana Seri Akar		Kota Bharu		
Istana Terengganu		Kuala Lumpur		
Mestika Palace		Shah Alam		
Syarqiyyah palace		Kuala Terengganu		
Istana Abu Bakar		Pahang		
Istana Arau		Perlis		
Istana Balai Besar		Kota Bharu		
Istana Bukit Tanah		Kelantan		
Istana Cempaka Sari		Perak		
Istana Changkat		Kuala Lumpur		
Istana Kuala Cegar		Kedah		
Istana Kinta		Perak		
Istana Raja Di Hilir		Perak		
Istana Kesoma		Kedah		
Myanmar
Arimadanapura Palace		Bagan		
Kanbawzathadi Palace		Bago		
Mandalay Palace		Mandalay		
Shwebo Palace		Shwebo		
Nepal
Narayanhiti Royal Palace		Kathmandu		
Hanuman Dhoka		Kathmandu		
Oman
Al Alam Palace		Muscat	ceremonial palace	
Al Baraka Palace		Seeb	Sultan's primary residence	
Al Maamoura Palace		Salalah	Sultan's residence	
Al Shomoukh Palace		Manah	Sultan's residence	
Palestine
Qasr al-Basha		Gaza		
Philippines
Darul Jambangan		Maimbung		
Singapore
Istana Kampong Glam		Kampong Glam		
Istana Woodneuk		Tyersall Park		
The Istana		Orchard		
Syria
Royal Palace of Mari		Mari		
Royal Palace of Ugarit		Ugarit		
Thailand
Grand Palace		Bangkok		
Dusit Palace		Bangkok		
Derm Palace		Bangkok		
Front Palace		Bangkok		
Rear Palace		Bangkok		
Saranrom Palace		Bangkok		
Phaya Thai palace		Bangkok		
Royal Palace of Ayutthaya		Ayutthaya		
Chandrakasem Palace		Ayutthaya		
Bang Pa-in royal Palace		Ayutthaya		
Chan royal palace			Phitsanulok	
Sanam Chandra Palace			Nakhon Pathom	
Phra Chuthathut Palace			ChonBuri	
King Narai's Palace			Lopburi	
Baan Puen Palace			Petchaburi	
Mrigadayavan Palace			Petchaburi	
Vietnam
Imperial City		Huế		
Kính Thiên Palace		Hanoi		
Citadel of the Hồ Dynasty		Thanh Hóa		

== Europe ==
Residence	Photo	City	Function	Link
Albania
Royal Palace	Royal Palace of Tirana	Tirana	Official residence of King Zog I; it now serves as residence of the President of Albania	
Austria
Hofburg Palace	Hofburg with Heldenplatz	Vienna	Winter residence of the Habsburgs until 1918; it now serves as residence of the President of Austria, museums and convention centre	
Schönbrunn Palace	Schönbrunn Palace in 2022	Vienna	Summer residence of the Habsburgs	
Belvedere	Belvedere Vienna April 2018	Vienna	Private residence of Prince Eugene of Savoy and then Imperial palace of empress Maria Theresa	
Hermesvilla	Hermesvilla	Vienna	Private residence of Empress Elisabeth in Vienna	
Hofburg	Hofburg, Innsbruck	Innsbruck	Residence of the Archdukes of Tyrol and the Habsburgs until 1918; it now serves as a museum	
Kaiservilla	Kaiservilla vorderansicht	Bad Ischl	Hunting lodge and private retreat of Franz Josef I of Austria	
Laxenburg Castle	Blauer Hof Laxenburg	Laxenburg	Summer residence of the Habsburgs, along with Schönbrunn Palace	
Belarus
Old Grodno Castle		Grodno		
Belgium
Royal Palace	Royal Palace, Brussels, August 2008	Brussels	Official residence of king Philip I	
Royal Castle of Laeken	0 Château Royal de Laeken	Brussels	Private residence of king Philip I	
Royal Greenhouses of Laeken	Laeken Greenhouses	Brussels	Recepctions and state visits	
Château du Belvédère	Château Belvedere Laeken	Brussels	Private Residence of former king Albert II	
Château du Stuyvenberg	Villa Stuyvenberg Laeken	Brussels	Private Residence of princess Astrid	
Château de Ciergnon	Ciergnon koninklijk kasteel 2-02-2013 17-08-05	Ciergnon, Houyet	Summer Residence	
Rochefort		Villers-sur-Lesse	Summer Residence	
Bulgaria
Royal Palace		Sofia	National Art Gallery	
Euxinograd		Varna		
Czech Republic
Prague Castle		Prague		
Denmark
Marselisborg Palace		Aarhus	privately owned by the crown:	
Château de Cayx		Cahors	privately owned by the crown:	
Amalienborg Palace,		Copenhagen	Palaces at the disposition by the crown:	
Christiansborg Palace		Copenhagen	Palaces at the disposition by the crown:	
Fredensborg Palace		Fredensborg	Palaces at the disposition by the crown:	
Gråsten Palace		Gråsten	Palaces at the disposition by the crown:	
Sorgenfri Palace		Lyngby-Taarbæk	Palaces at the disposition by the crown:	
Hermitage Hunting Lodge		Jægersborg Dyrehave	Palaces at the disposition by the crown:	
Estonia
Kadriorg Palace		Tallinn		
Finland
Imperial Palace		Helsinki	official residences of the President of Finland.	
France
Palace of Versailles		Versailles		
Palais du Louvre		Paris		
Palais des Tuileries		Paris		
Palais-Royal		Paris	Seat of the Ministry of Culture, the Conseil d'État and the Constitutional Council	
Luxembourg Palace		Paris		
Palais de la Cité		Paris		
Palace of Fontainebleau		Fontainebleau		
Château de Saint-Germain-en-Laye		Saint-Germain-en-Laye		
Château de Compiègne		Compiègne		
Château de Saint-Cloud		Saint-Cloud		
Château de Rambouillet		Rambouillet		
Château de Blois		Blois		
Château d'Amboise		Amboise		
Château de Chambord		Chambord, Loir-et-Cher		
Château de Marly		Marly-le-Roi		
Château de Meudon		Meudon		
Georgia
Batonis Castle		Telavi	the 17th Century royal stronghold containing the palace of the Kakhetian kings of eastern Georgia in Telavi.	
Dadiani Palace of Queen		Zugdidi	a 19th Century palace built by David Dadiani the Prince of Samegrelo.	
Dadiani Palace of Prince		Zugdidi	a 19th Century palace built by David Dadiani the Prince of Samegrelo.	
Geguti Palace		Kutaisi	12th Century ruins of the palace of the kings of Imereti in western Georgia.	
Mukhrani Palace		Mukhrani	Built in 1885, was a seat of the princely House of Mukhrani. Located in Mukhrani, near Mtskheta in the eastern part of Georgia.	
Viceroy's Palace		Tbilisi	the former palace of the Russian Viceroys built in 1818.	
Sachino Palace		Tbilisi	a surviving part of an 18th Century palace built by Kartlian King Erekli II for his queen in Tbilisi.	
Germany
Berliner Schloss		Berlin		
Charlottenburg Castle		Berlin		
Stadtschloss, Potsdam		Potsdam		
Sanssouci		Potsdam		
Dresden Castle		Dresden		
Zwinger		Dresden		
Karlsruhe Palace		Karlsruhe		
Residenz		Munich		
Nymphenburg Palace		Munich		
Schleissheim Palace		Munich		
Neues Schloss		Stuttgart		
Ludwigsburg Palace		Ludwigsburg		
Leineschloss		Hanover		
Greece
Old Royal Palace		Athens	historically the Royal Palace of Athens, today houses the Parliament	
New Royal Palace		Athens	historically Crown Prince's Royal Palace, or Royal Palace of the Duke of Sparta, now the Presidential Manor,	
Royal Mansion		Psychiko	only Crown Prince Paul and Crown Princess Frederica residence, today private property, Athens	
Tatoi Palace		Parnitha	was the summer estate of the former Greek royal family, Athens	
Queen's Tower		Athens	former royal estate held only by Queen Amalia, now private property	
Palace of St. Michael and St. George		Corfu	originally the house of the British Lord High Commissioner of the Ionian Islands, now the seat of the Sino-Japanese Museum,	
Mon Repos		Corfu	a summer residence of the former Greek royal family. It is now an archaeological museum.	
Achilleion		Corfu	Royal Palace of the Empress Elizabeth of Austria, never held by the Greek Royal Family,	
Palace of the Grand Master of the Knights of Rhodes		Rhodes	medieval palace renovated during Italian Occupation to constitute the summer estate of the King of Italy, never held by the Greek Royal Family	
Thessaloniki Government House		Kalamaria	a royal mansion in Salonica situated in the suburb of	
House of Princess Alice		Neo Heraklion	Donated to the Red Cross. It now also belongs to the municipality of Neos Heraklion and houses a club for the elderly	
Hungary
Buda Castle		Budapest		
Ireland
Dublin Castle		Dublin		
Italy
Palazzo dei Normanni		Palermo	Historic residence of the Kings of Sicily, now seat of the Sicilian Regional Assembly since 1946.	
Palazzina Cinese		Palermo		
Palazzo Reale della Ficuzza		Palermo	Residence and hunting lodge of Ferdinand IV of Naples and III of Sicily during his exile in Sicily.	
Palazzo Chiaramonte		Palermo		
Royal Palace		Turin	Residence of the House of Savoy until 1946, now a museum	
Castello del Valentino		Turin		
Palazzo Madama e Casaforte degli Acaja		Turin		
Palazzo Carignano		Turin		
Villa della Regina		Turin		
Royal Palace of Venaria		Turin		
Castello della Mandria		Turin		
Palazzina di caccia of Stupinigi		Turin		
Castle of Rivoli		Turin		
Castle of Moncalieri		Turin		
Castle of Agliè		Turin		
Castle of Racconigi		Turin		
Royal Palace		Naples	18th century residence of the Buorbons as rulers of the Kingdom of Naples and later of the Two Sicilies.	
Reggia di Capodimonte		Naples	summer residence and hunting lodge of the Bourbon kings, now comprises the Museo di Capodimonte.	
Reggia di Quisisana		Naples		
Palace of Portici		Naples		
Castel Nuovo		Naples		
Castel Capuano		Naples		
Castel Sant'Elmo		Naples		
Castel dell'Ovo		Naples		
Casina Vanvitelliana		Naples		
Royal Palace of Ischia		Naples		
Villa Favorita		Naples		
Villa Floridiana		Naples		
Villa Rosebery		Naples	From June 1944, residence of King Victor Emmanuel III until his exile in 1946; now one of the three official residences of the President of Italy.	
Royal Palace of Caserta		Caserta		
Royal Palace of Carditello		Caserta		
Belvedere di San Leucio		Caserta		
Quirinal Palace		Rome	Main residence of the President of Italy	
Presidential Estate of Castelporziano		Rome		
Lateran Palace		Rome		
Hadrian's Villa		Rome		
Palazzina Reale		Rome	Residence of King Victor Emmanuel III; seat of the embassy of Egypt in Rome since 1997.	
Castello Ursino		Catania		
Casino Reale di Persano		Salerno		
Palazzo Pitti		Florence		
Royal Palace of Milan		Milan		
Villa Belgiojoso Bonaparte		Milan		
Royal Villa of Monza		Monza		
Royal Palace of Genoa		Genoa		
Miramare Castle		Trieste		
Palazzo Reale		Cagliari		
Liechtenstein
Vaduz Castle		Vaduz		
Lithuania
Royal Palace of Lithuania		Vilnius		
Luxembourg
Grand Ducal Palace, Luxembourg		Luxembourg		
Monaco
The Prince's Palace		Monaco		
Montenegro
King Nikola's Palace		Cetinje		
Podgorica Royal Palace		Podgorica		
Blue Palace		Cetinje		
Nikšić Royal Palace		Nikšić		
Bar Royal Palace		Bar		
Biljarda		Cetinje		
Netherlands
Royal Palace		Amsterdam		
Noordeinde Palace		The Hague		
Huis ten Bosch		The Hague		
Binnenhof		The Hague		
Het Loo Palace		Apeldoorn		
Soestdijk Palace		Baarn		
Anneville (Ulvenhout)		Ulvenhout		
Bronbeek		Arnhem		
City Hall of Tilburg		Tilburg		
Het Oude Loo		Apeldoorn		
Kneuterdijk Palace		The Hague		
Koninklijke Schouwburg		The Hague		
Lange Voorhout Palace		The Hague		
Mauritshuis		The Hague		
Huis Huguetan		The Hague		
Stadhouderlijk Hof		Leeuwarden		
Drakestein		Lage Vuursche		
Breda Castle		Breda		
Huis Doorn		Doorn		
De Horsten		Wassenaar		
Hof van Solms		Oirschot		
Oranje Nassau's Oord		Wageningen		
Kasteel Vaeshartelt		Maastricht		
Duin en Kruidberg		Santpoort-Noord		
Villa Welgelegen		Haarlem		
Norway
Royal Palace, Oslo		Oslo		
Skaugum		Asker	Residence of the King of Norway.	
Stiftsgården		Trondheim		
Gamlehaugen		Bergen		
Kongsseteren		Oslo		
Bygdøy kongsgård		Oslo		
Oscarshall		Oslo		
Paléet		Oslo		
Poland
Bobolice Castle		Bobolice		
Chęciny Castle		Chęciny		
Wawel Castle		Kraków		
Lanckorona Castle		Lanckorona		
Łęczyca Castle				
Royal Castle		Lublin		
Malbork Castle		Malbork		
Niepołomice Castle		Niepołomice		
Nowy Sącz Castle		Nowy Sącz		
Royal Castle	|	Poznań		
Piotrków Trybunalski Castle		Poznań	Piotrków Trybunalski	
Imperial Castle				
Sandomierz Castle		Sandomierz		
Sanok Castle		Sanok		
Ducal Castle		Szczecin	Residence of the House of Griffin which ruled the Duchy of Pomerania and Pomerania-Stettin	
Palace of the Pomeranian Estates Assembly		Szczecin	Residence of the monarch of Prussia for the visits in the city; currently housing a division of the National Museum in Szczecin	
Tykocin Castle		Tykocin		
Belweder		Warsaw		
Casimir Palace		Warsaw		
Marymont Palace		Warsaw	Summer residence of king John III Sobieski	
Marywil		Warsaw		
Myślewice Palace		Warsaw		
Palace on the Isle		Warsaw	Warsaw	
Royal Castle		Warsaw	Warsaw	
Saxon Palace		Warsaw	Warsaw	
Ujazdów Castle		Warsaw	Warsaw	
Wilanów Palace		Warsaw	Warsaw	
Royal Palace		Wrocław	Warsaw	
Portugal			Warsaw	
Ajuda National Palace		Lisbon	Warsaw	royal residence in 1828 and 1862–1889.
Queluz National Palace		Queluz	replaced the Royal Barrack in 1794.	
Sintra National Palace		Sintra		
Belem Palace		Lisbon	official residence of the Presidents of the Republic since 1912.	
Necessidades Palace		Lisbon	royal residence in 1821–1822, 1828-1861 and 1889–1910. Now headquarters of Portuguese Ministry of Foreign Affairs.	
Pena Palace		Sintra		
Citadel Palace		Cascais		
Mafra National Palace		Mafra		
Palace of the Carrancas		Porto	now Soares dos Reid Museum.	
Dom Manuel Palace		Évora	only one wing of the palace survives.	
Ducal Palace		Alentejo	used by the royal family but privately owned as part of the dukedom of Braganza estates.	
Ribeira Palace		Lisbon	royal residence since 1503, destroyed by 1755 earthquake.	
Royal Barrack		Lisbon	wooden building that served as royal residence after the 1755 earthquake, destroyed in 1794 and replaced by the Queluz Palace.	
Alcaçova Palace		São Jorge Castle	Lisbon. Royal residence in 1255–1503, destroyed by 1755 earthquake.	
Salvaterra Palace		Salvaterra de Magos	no longer extant.	
Almeirim Palace		Almeirim	lost.	
Corte Real palace		Lisbon	previous palace of the Corte Real family, bought by the crown for the princes. Destroyed by fire in 1751 and remains destroyed by 1755 earthquake.	
Pinheiro Palace		Herdade do Pinheiro	Previously a Royal property, now in private ownership.	
Guimaraes Castle		Guimaraes	residence of the Counts of Portugal between 1095 and 1131.	
Paço das Escolas		Coimbra	royal residence between 1131 and 1255, used by Coimbra University since 1537.	
Bemposta Palace		Lisbon	Built by Catherine of Braganza widow of Charles II of England, on her return to Portugal. Royal residence in 1822–1826. Now part of the Portuguese Military Academy.	
Palacio Real de Alcantara		Lisbon	located in the area of Calvario, mostly destroyed in 1755. Only part of the old stables survive in calvario square.	
Santos Royal Palace		Lisbon	sold to the family of the Marquis of Abrantes in the 17th century who lived in it up to 1909. Currently it is the Embassy of France in Lisbon.	
Quinta Real de Caxias		Caxias	small palace with formal gardens and large baroque cascade with sculptures by Machado de Castro. Royal residence in 1861–1862.	
Romania
Royal Palace (Bucharest)		Bucharest		
Cotroceni Palace		Bucharest		
Peleș Castle		Sinaia		
Săvârșin Castle		Arad County		
Elisabeta Palace		Bucharest		
Russia
Grand Kremlin Palace		Moscow		
Terem Palace		Moscow		
Peterhof Palace		Saint Petersburg		
Stroganov Palace		Saint Petersburg		
Summer Palace		Saint Petersburg		
Tsarskoye Selo		Pushkin		
Vorontsov's Palace		Saint Petersburg		
Winter Palace		Saint Petersburg		
Serbia
Stari Dvor		Belgrade	lit. "Old Palace"; official residence of the King from 1884 to 1922; now Belgrade City Hall	
Novi Dvor		Belgrade	lit. "New Palace"; official residence of the King from 1922 to 1934; now the seat of the President of Serbia	
Kraljevski Dvor		Belgrade	lit. "Royal Palace"; official residence of the King from 1934 to 1941; now the residence of the Crown Prince-pretender to the Serbian throne	
Beli Dvor		Belgrade	lit. "White Palace"; official residence of the Prince Regent from 1934 to 1941; now used as the site for receptions and public events of the Crown Prince-pretender to the Serbian throne	
Villa Zlatni Breg		Smederevo	lit. "Golden Hill Villa"; private residence and summer retreat of the house of Obrenović from 1865 to 1903; now state representation house	
Spain
Royal Palace of Madrid		Madrid	official residence of the King	
Royal Seat of San Lorenzo de El Escorial		Madrid	Royal Castle & Monastery of El Escorial	
Royal Palace of El Pardo		Madrid		
Palace of Zarzuela		Madrid	residence of the King and Royal Family, part of the larger El Pardo complex	
Royal Palace of Aranjuez		Madrid		
Royal House of the Farmer		Aranjuez		
Cottage of the Prince		Madrid		
Royal Palace of La Granja de San Ildefonso		Segovia		
Royal Palace of Riofrío		Segovia		
Royal Palace of La Almudaina		Palma de Mallorca		
Sweden
Royal Palace		Stockholm		
Drottningholm Palace		Drottningholm		
Chinese Pavilion		Drottningholm		
Gripsholm Castle		Mariefred		
Gustav III's Pavilion		Hagaparken		
Haga Palace		Hagaparken		
Rosendal Palace		Djurgården		
Rosersberg Palace		Rosersberg		
Strömsholm Palace		Kolbäck		
Tullgarn Palace		Södertälje		
Ulriksdal Palace		Solna		
Ukraine
Royal Palace		Lviv		
Turkey
Topkapı Palace	Topkapı Palace	Istanbul	In the 15th and 16th centuries it served as the main residence and administrative headquarters of the Ottoman sultans.	
Çırağan Palace	Çırağan Palace	Istanbul	Former Ottoman palace, is now a five-star hotel in the Kempinski Hotels chain.	
Dolmabahçe Palace	Dolmabahçe Palace	Istanbul	Dolmabahçe Palace served as the main administrative center of the Ottoman Empire from 1856 to 1887 and from 1909 to 1922.	
Beylerbeyi Palace	Beylerbeyi Palace	Istanbul	Beylerbeyi Palace was commissioned by Sultan Abdülaziz (1830–1876) and built between 1861 and 1865 as a summer residence and a place to entertain visiting heads of state.	
Yıldız Palace	Yıldız Palace	Istanbul	Yıldız Palace built in the 19th and early 20th centuries. It was used as a residence by the Sultan and his court in the late 19th century.	
Küçüksu Pavilion	Küçüksu Pavilion	Istanbul	Küçüksu Pavilion was used by Ottoman sultans for short stays during country excursions and hunting.	
Adile Sultan Palace	Adile Sultan Palace	Istanbul	Adile Sultan Palace is the former royal residence of Ottoman princess Adile Sultan. It was donated to the state by Adile Sultan to be used as a school building for the Kandilli Anatolian High School for Girls and is today a cultural center.	
United Kingdom
Buckingham Palace		London		
Westminster Palace		London		
St James's Palace		London		
Kensington Palace		London		
Richmond Palace		London		
Palace of Whitehall		London		
Windsor Castle		Windsor		
Eltham Palace		Eltham		
Hampton Court Palace		Richmond		
Nonsuch Palace		Nonsuch Park		
Holyrood Palace		Edinburgh		
Linlithgow Palace		Linlithgow		
Falkland Palace		Falkland		
Hillsborough Castle		Royal Hillsborough		

== Oceania ==
Residence	Photo	City	Function	Link
Tonga
Royal Palace, Tonga		Nukuʻalofa		
French Polynesia
Royal Palace		Papeete		
Fiji
Royal Palace		Levuka		
New Zealand
Turangawaewae		Ngaruawahia		
Samoa
Villa Vailele		Vailele		
United States
Hānaiakamalama		Honolulu		
Huliheʻe Palace		Honolulu		
ʻIolani Palace		Honolulu		
Wallis and Futuna
Royal Palace		Uvea		
Royal Palace		Sigave		
Royal Palace		Alo		

== See also ==
- List of palaces
- List of British Royal Residences
- Official residence
- Palais Royal (disambiguation)
