= Zlaty dukat =

Slovakian building

Coordinates: 48°43′8″N 21°15′30″E

Zlaty Dukat is a building in the historical pedestrian zone in the heart of Kosice city, Slovakia. In the near surrounding of the building, there are situated the most significant memorials of the city. The history of the building reaches approximately back to the year 1240. It is assumed that basement walls were part of the first Royal house in Kosice city. Currently, there is a four star hotel Zlaty Dukat Zlaty Dukat in the building. Inside the building you can find a private collection of historical Slovak and Czech glassmakers from period of 17th-20th century, thereabouts 500 unique pieces of periods of early Baroque, Classicism, Rococo, Empire style, Biedermeier, Historicsm and Art Nouveau.

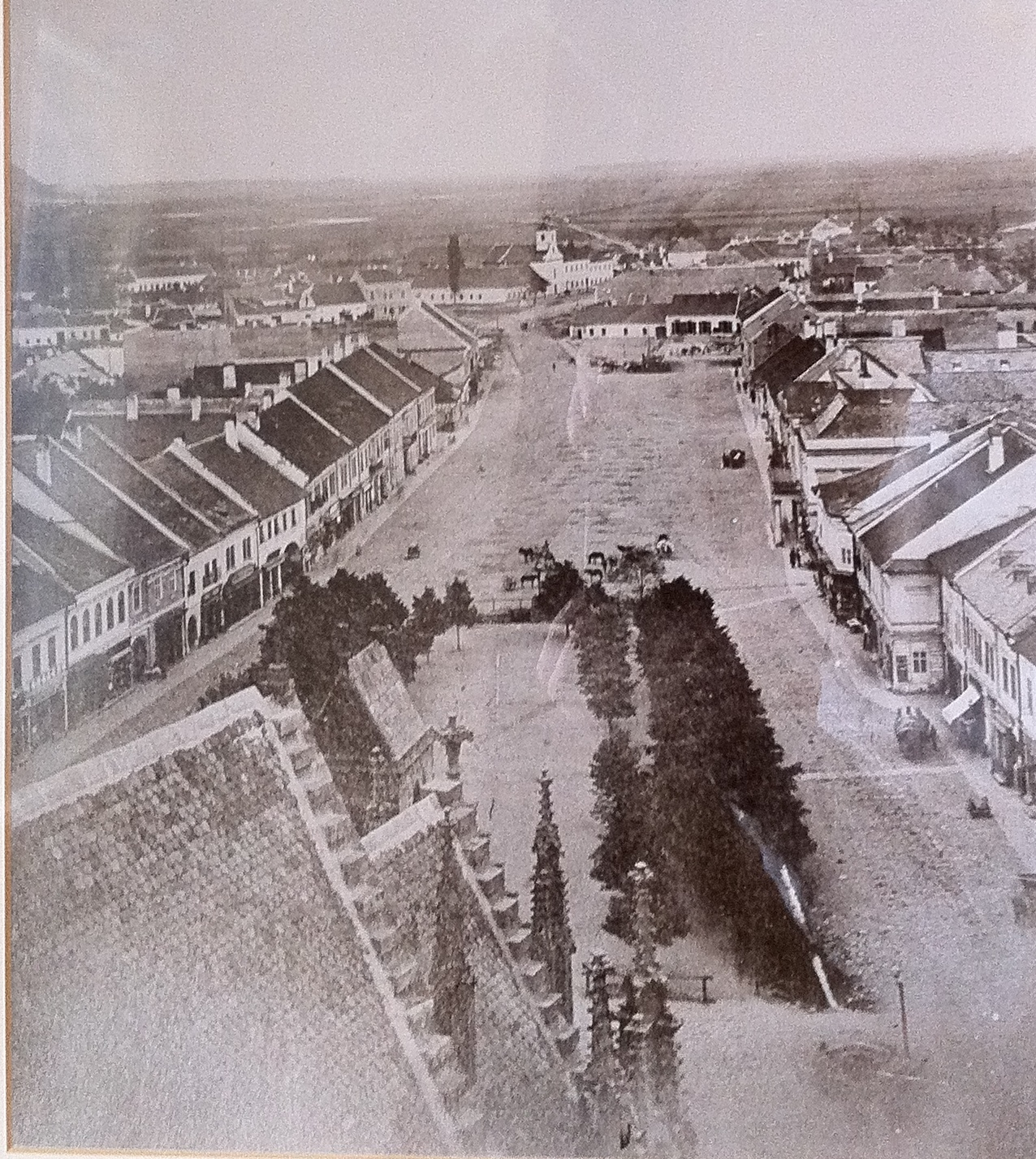
Kosice1860

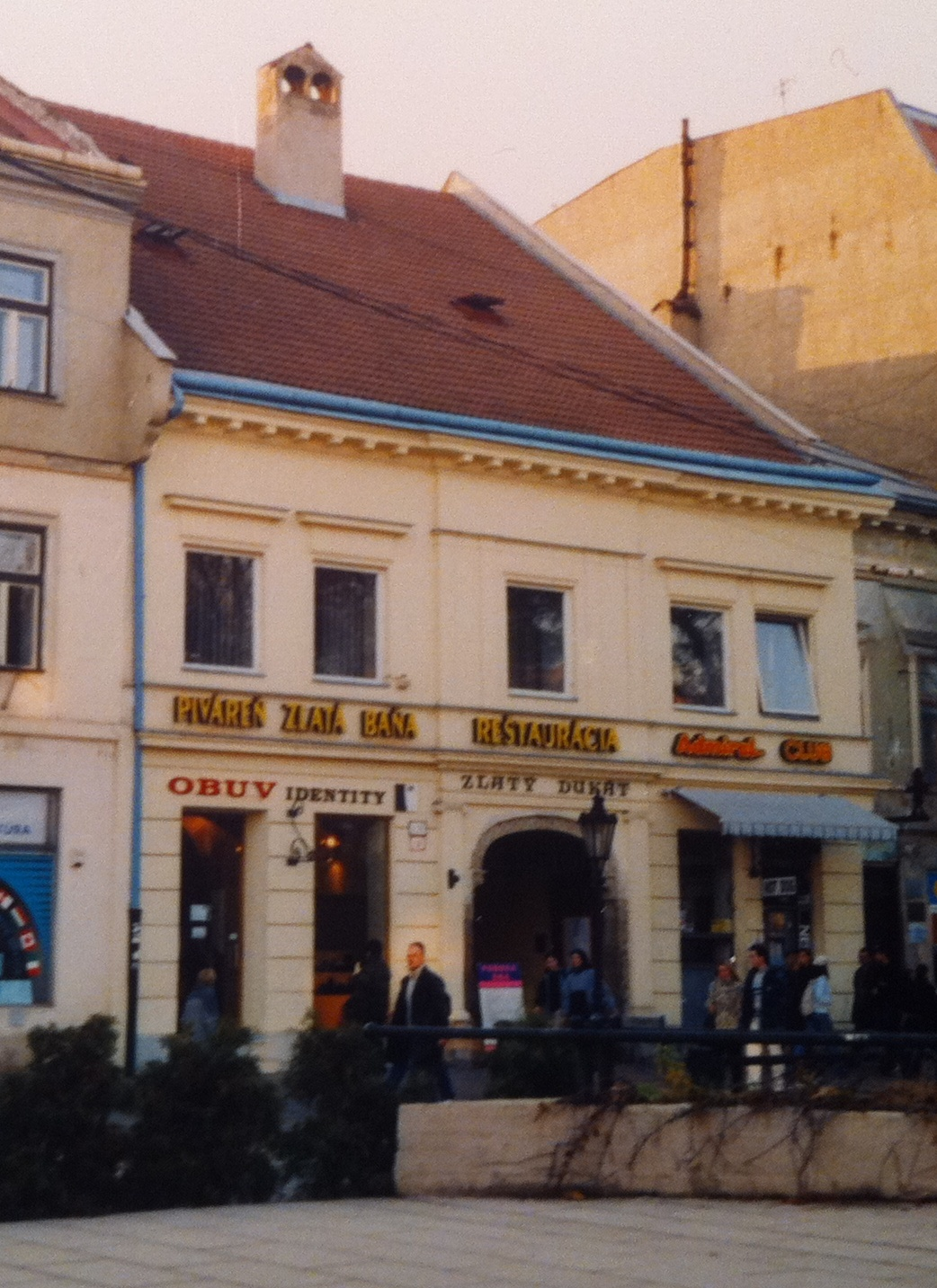
Zlatydukat

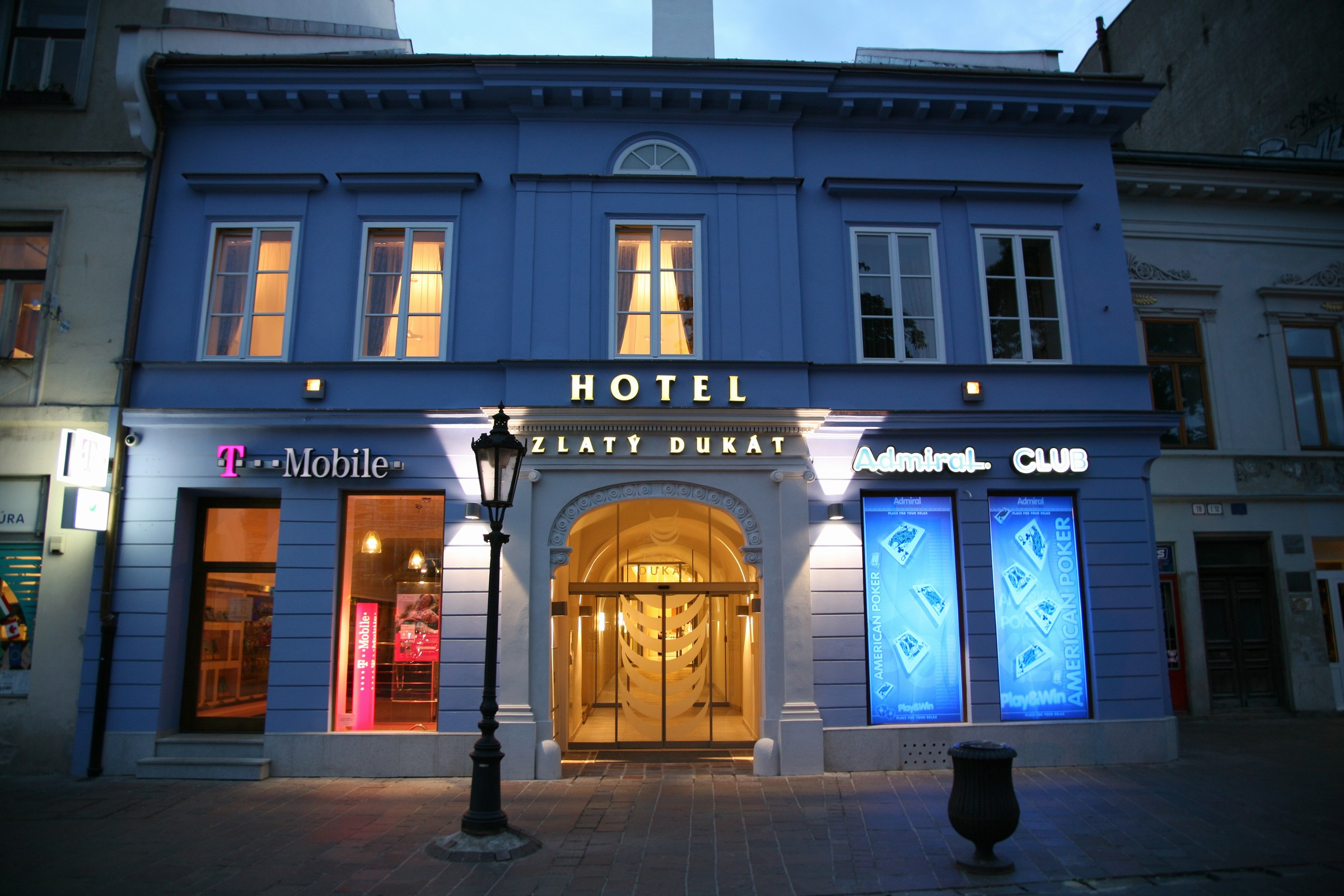
Zlatydukat2011
