= Alfred Hofmann =

Austrian sculptor (1879–1958)

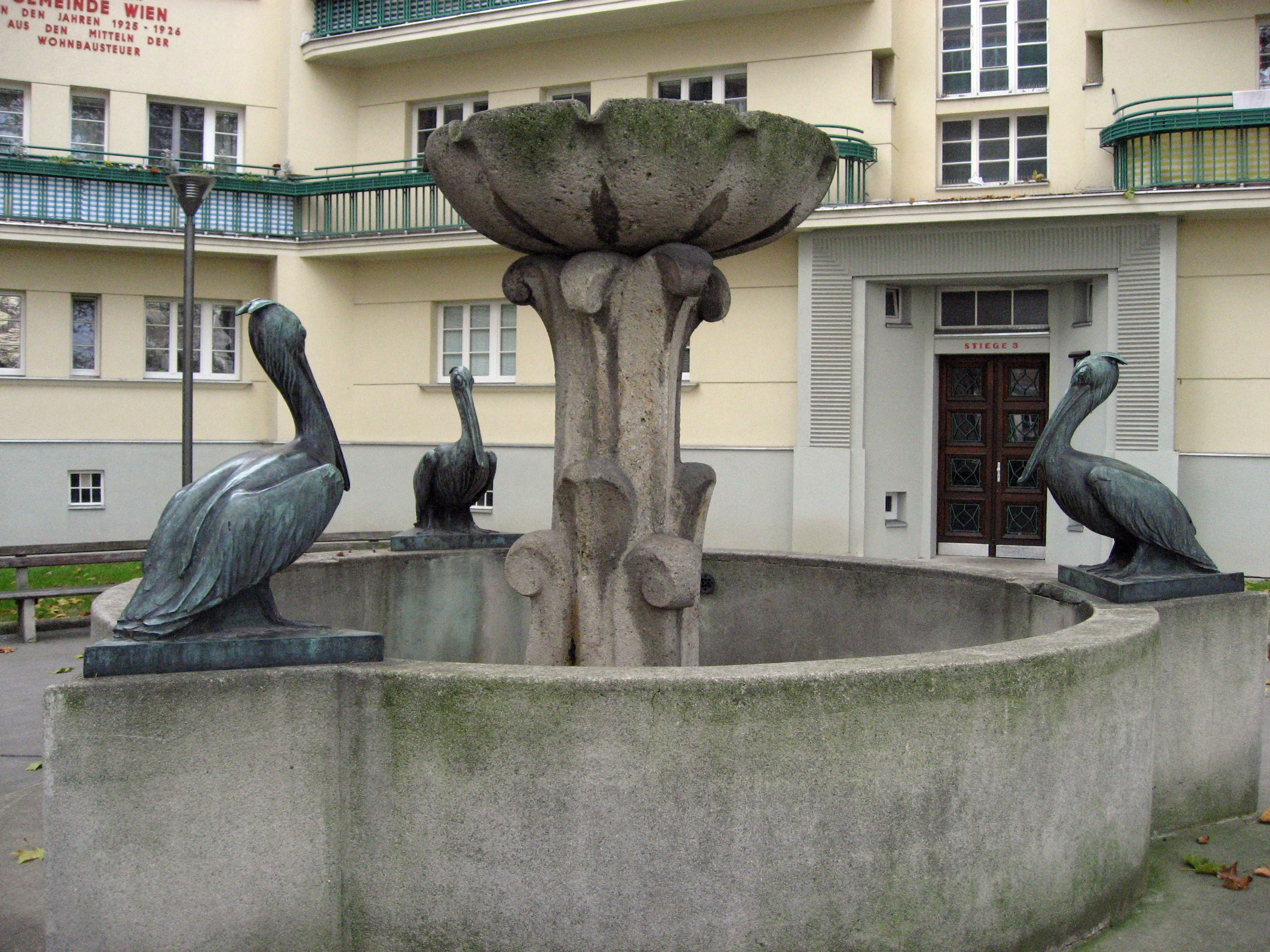
Pelican fountains (1926) by Alfred Hofmann, Widholzhof, Simmering, Vienna.

Alfred Hofmann (28 November 1879 – 1 August 1958) was an Austrian medallist, gem-cutter and sculptor in wood, bronze, limestone, marble, cameo and other materials. Works by him are in the collections of the Museum of Military History (such as the miniature memorial Artilleriefeldgeschütz, bronzed zinc, 1914–15), the Kunsthistorisches Museum, the Österreichische Galerie Belvedere and Wrocław City Museum. From 1906 until 1936 he was a member of the Vienna Secession and the Vienna Künstlerhaus. He was also a member of the Deutscher Künstlerbund.

== Life ==
Born in Vienna, Hofmann studied in the Vienna Academy of Fine Arts from 1895 to 1904. There his tutors included the sculptors Edmund von Hellmer and Caspar von Zumbusch. He spent several months in 1905 and 1906 on a study trip to Italy and in 1906 he was awarded the Reichel-Preis for his Blüte (Flower).

On 3 October 1915, his Feldhaubitze in Eisen (Field-Howitzers in Iron) was unveiled in the roofed riding-school of the Rennweger Barracks – it had been commissioned as a nail man by No. 13 Field Howitzter Division of the Imperial-Royal Landwehr. He was later awarded the Staatspreis in 1921 and 1924 for his statuette Maler Hänisch (Hänish Painter). He died in Vienna.

== Bibliography ==
- (in German) Hofmann, Alfred. In: Hans Vollmer (ed.): Allgemeines Lexikon der Bildenden Künstler von der Antike bis zur Gegenwart. Begründet von Ulrich Thieme und Felix Becker. Band 17: Heubel–Hubard. E. A. Seemann, Leipzig 1924, S. 248–249.
- (in German) Ilse Krumpöck: Die Bildwerke im Heeresgeschichtlichen Museum. Wien 2004, OCLC 76185123, S. 65.
