= Istana Terengganu, Kuala Lumpur =

Istana Terengganu
- Istana Terengganu
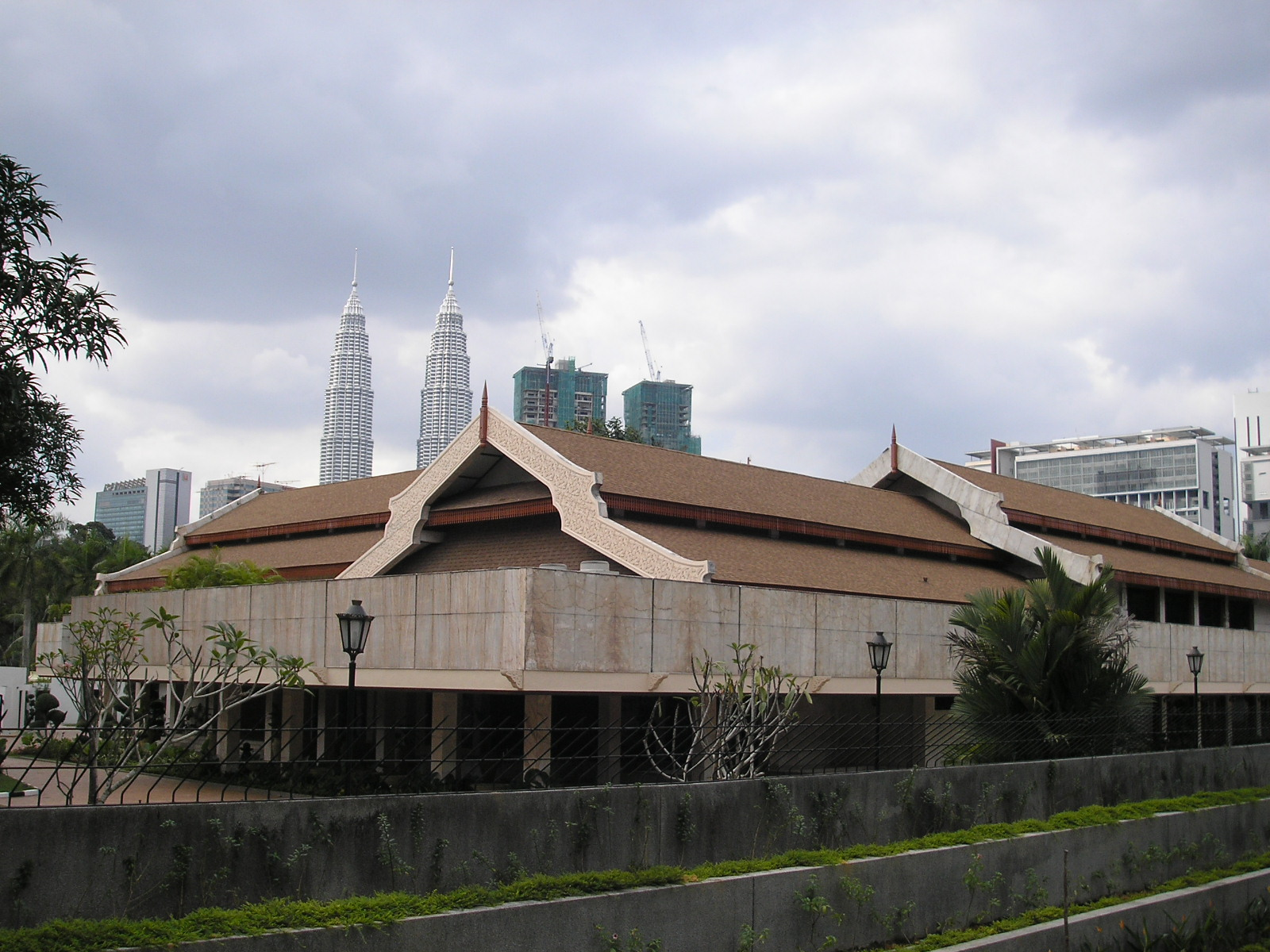
- Istana Terengganu, Kuala Lumpur

General information
- Architectural style: Modern with traditional Malay motifs
- Location: Jalan Tun Razak, Kuala Lumpur, Kuala Lumpur, Malaysia
- Current tenants: Sultan of Terengganu and the royal family

The Istana Terengganu is the official city-residence of the Sultan of Terengganu and the royal family, in Kuala Lumpur, Malaysia. It is located at Jalan Tun Razak, close to the Royal Selangor Golf Club. Neighbouring next to it is the Istana Perlis.

The building is modern, but has traditional Malay motifs and designs incorporated into it.

Between 2006-2011, Mizan Zainal Abidin, 17th Sultan of Terengganu was reigning as the 13th Yang di-Pertuan Agong. During those years, he and the immediate royal family resided at the Istana Negara instead, but continued to use this residence as his secondary home.
