= Casina Vanvitelliana =

- Casina Vanvitelliana (Italian)
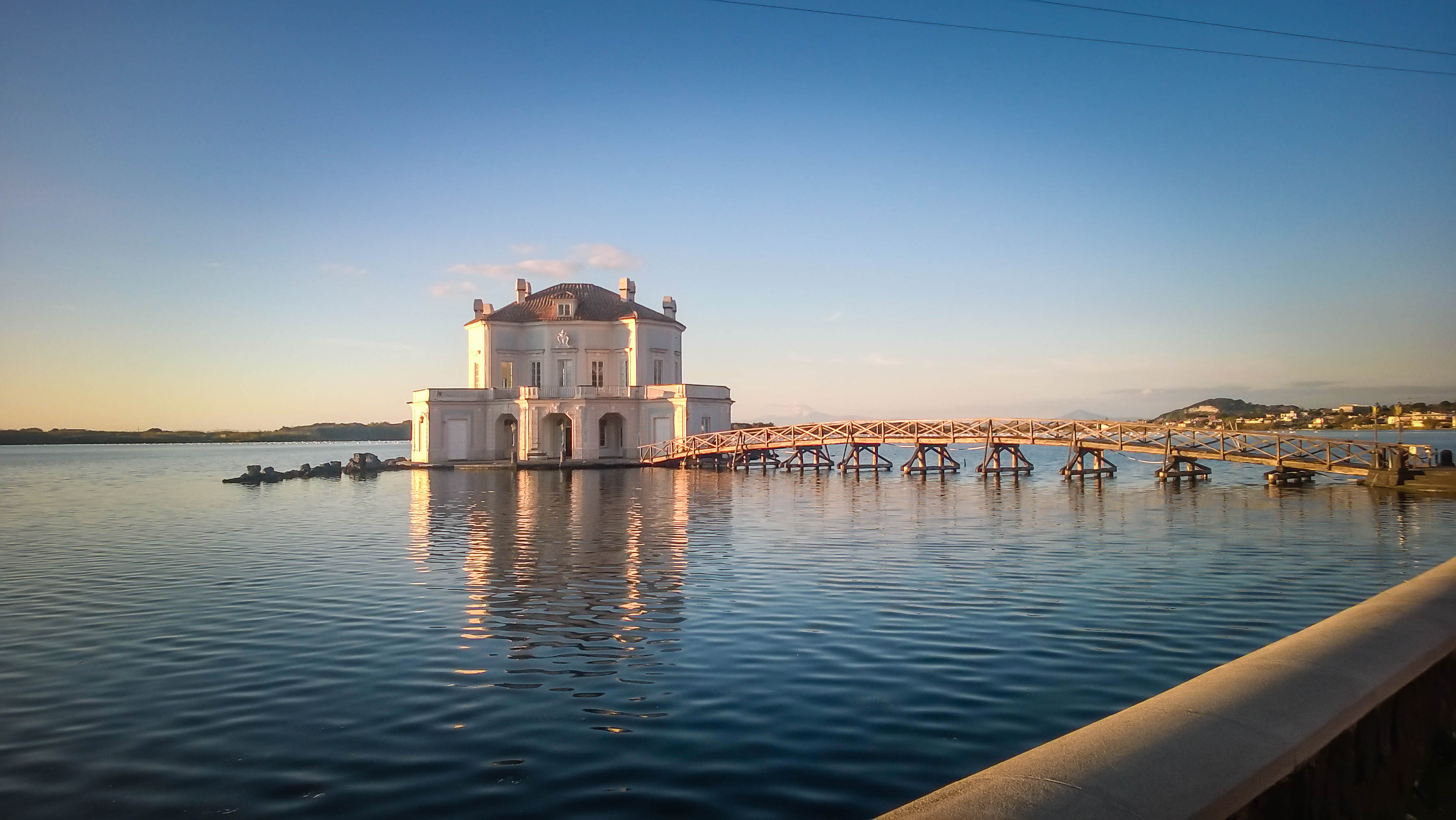
- View in 2014
- Interactive map of the Casina Vanvitelliana area

General information
- Architectural style: Baroque
- Location: Piazza Gioacchino Rossini, Bacoli 80070, Metropolitan City of Naples, Campania, Italy
- Coordinates: 40°49′10.93″N 14°03′29.69″E
- Inaugurated: 1782
- Client: Bacoli local government
- Owner: Bacoli local government

Design and construction
- Architects: Luigi Vanvitelli and Carlo Vanvitelli

Other information
- Public transit access: Naples SFM (Cumana): Fusaro station

The Casina Vanvitelliana is a hunting lodge located on a small island in Fusaro Lake, in the municipality of Bacoli.

== History ==
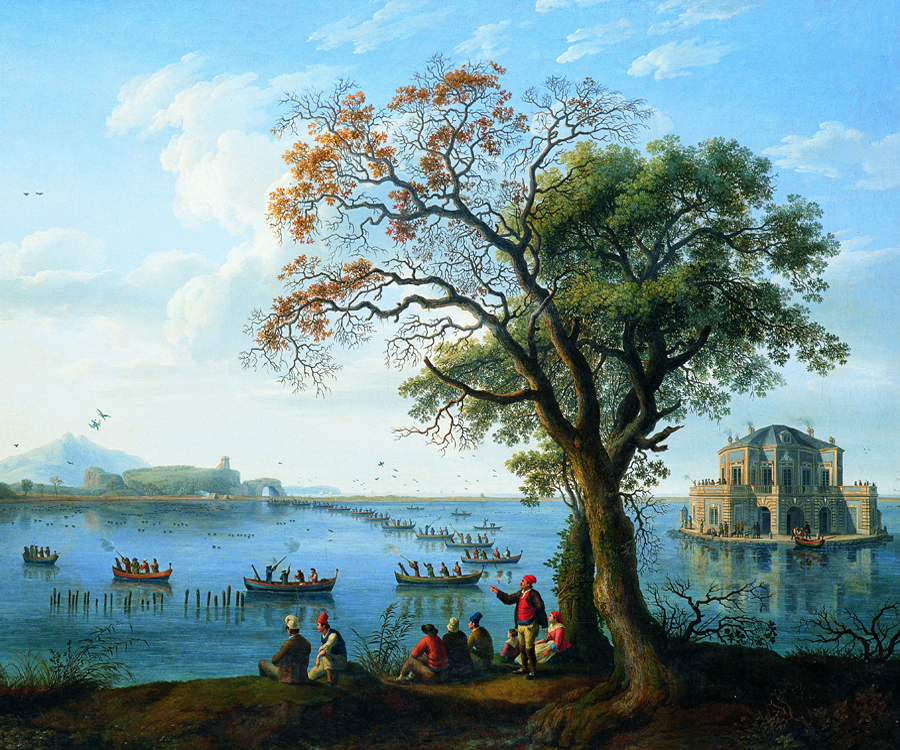
The Casina Vanvitelliana in the painting Ferdinand IV, King of Naples Hunting Coots on Lake Fusaro, painted by Jakob Philipp Hackert in 1783

Starting in 1752, the area of Fusaro Lake, then sparsely inhabited, became the hunting and fishing reserve of the Bourbons, who entrusted Luigi Vanvitelli with the first works for the transformation of the area.

After the accession of Ferdinand IV, the interventions were completed by Carlo Vanvitelli, Luigi's son, who in 1782 built the Royal Hunting Lodge on the lake, a short distance from the shore.

The building, known as the Casina Vanvitelliana, was used as a residence for distinguished guests, including Francis II, Holy Roman Emperor, who stayed there in May 1819.

The building also hosted Gioachino Rossini and, more recently, Italian President Luigi Einaudi. Wolfgang Amadeus Mozart visited Lake Fusaro, although his journey to Naples and its surroundings took place in 1770, when the transformation of the Fusaro area had already begun but the Casina had not yet been built.

== Description ==
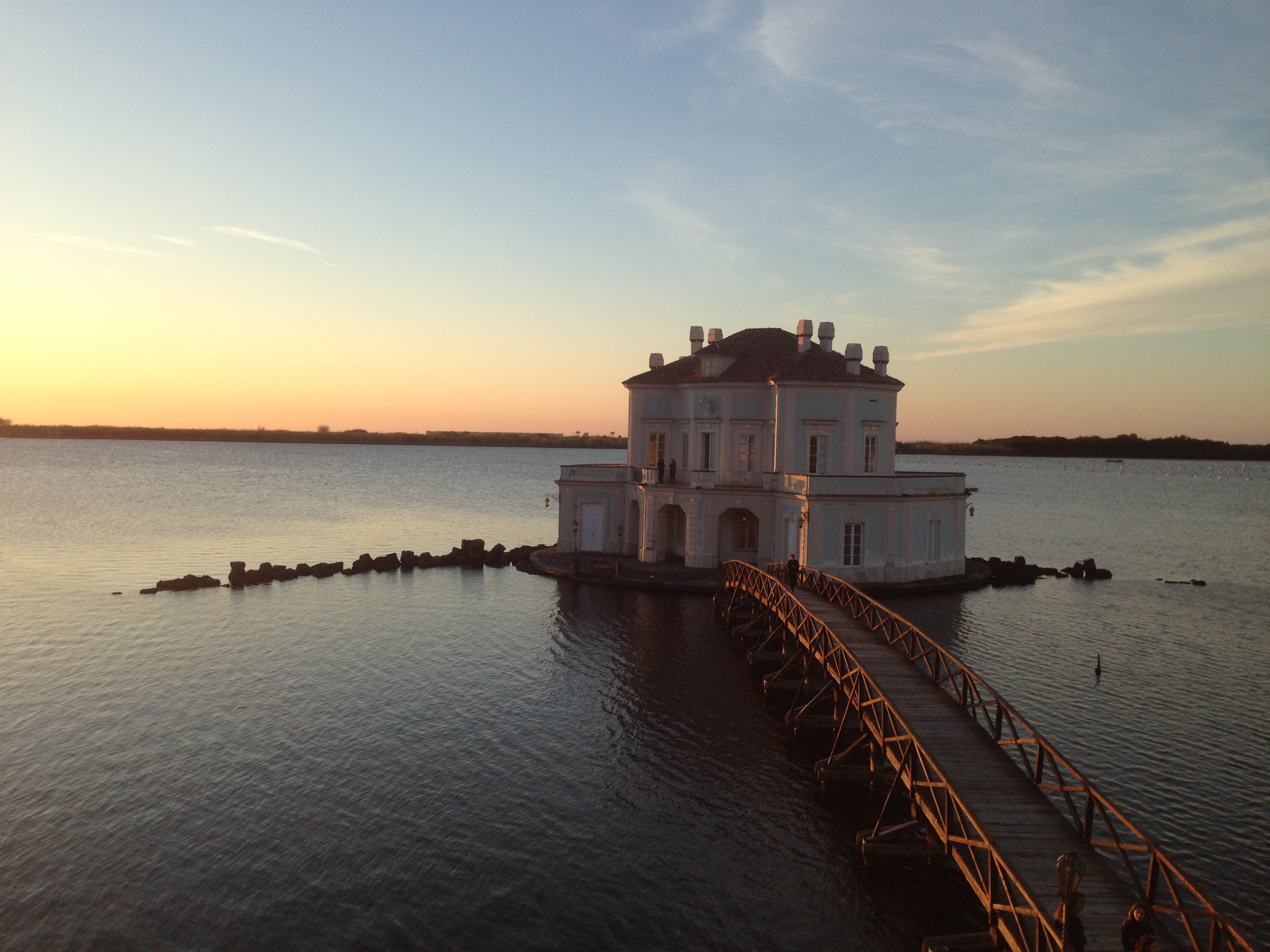
The Casina at sunset

From an architectural point of view, the Casina is considered one of the finest examples of 18th-century architecture, with some references to the layout of the Palazzina di caccia of Stupinigi, designed several years earlier by Filippo Juvarra through the use of sculptural volumes and large windows.

The building commissioned by the Bourbons has a highly articulated plan, consisting of three octagonal structures intersecting one above the other and narrowing in the form of a pagoda, with large windows arranged on two levels. From the Circular Hall on the lower floor, animated during the Bourbon era by social and courtly gatherings, a staircase leads to the piano nobile, in the so-called Hall of Wonders, accessible exclusively to the royal family. Here the Bourbons could relax in a more private setting, which also included a service room and a private study, while enjoying the surrounding landscape, also depicted in the wall paintings dedicated to the Four Seasons, created by the vedutista Jakob Philipp Hackert.

== In popular culture ==
The Casina Vanvitelliana appears in the film Ferdinando and Carolina, directed by Lina Wertmüller, as well as in Contraband by Lucio Fulci (1980) and in Santa Lucia (2021) by Marco Chiappetta. It was also one of the filming locations for The Trick in the Sheet (2009) starring Maria Grazia Cucinotta.

There is also a widespread but mistaken belief that it was the enchanted stilt house of the Fairy with Turquoise Hair (Gina Lollobrigida) in the famous television miniseries The Adventures of Pinocchio by Comencini from 1972. The misunderstanding mainly derives from its resemblance to the evocative stilt-house structure seen in the series. In reality, the exterior scenes of the fairy's house were filmed in locations in the province of Viterbo and the Metropolitan City of Rome Capital, in Lazio, specifically at the marine pools of the Lido delle Saline in Tarquinia and at the small Lake Martignano. The wooden walkway and the house itself, built specifically for the filming of the miniseries and no longer existing today, were considerably smaller, while the house featured a simpler Art Nouveau façade unlike the more elaborate Baroque style of the Vanvitelliana.

Since 2023, it has hosted FAB! The Archaeological Cinema Festival.

In 2024, the "Libreria del Lago", a public library and media library, was inaugurated.
