= Royal Palace of Almeirim =

Palace in Almeirim, now a ruin

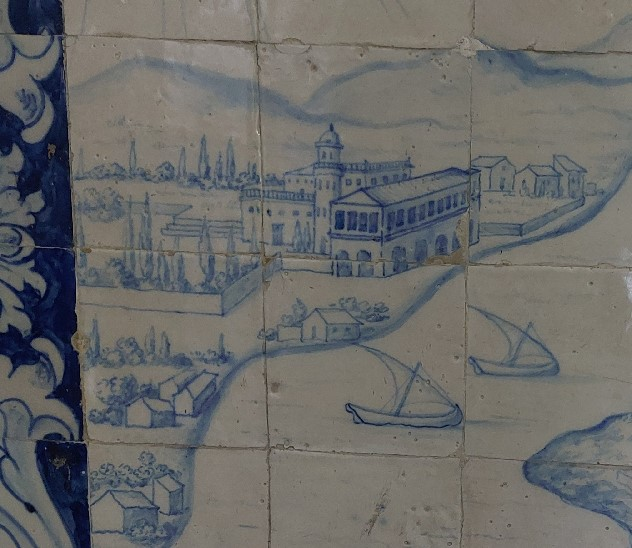
Tile depicting the royal palace of Almeirim before its destruction in the Monastery of São Vicente de Fora, Lisbon

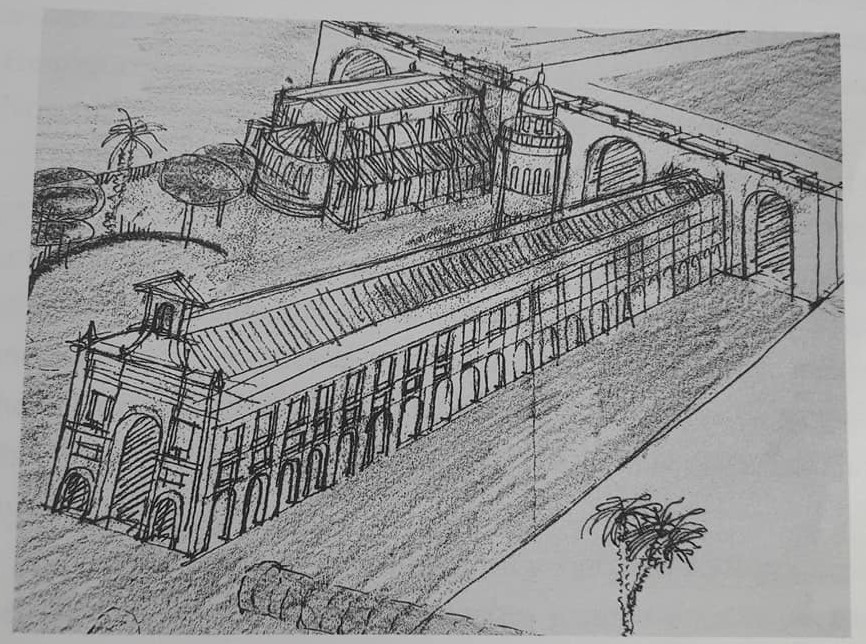
Reconstruction of the royal palace of Almeirim by the architect Elias Cachado Rodriguez

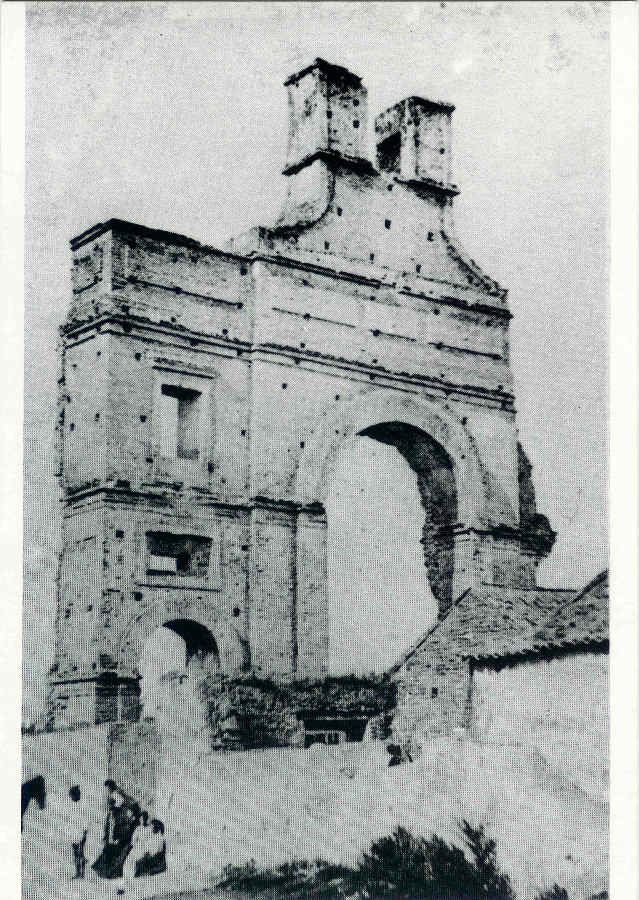
Ruins of the portico of the royal palace of Almeirim in the 19th century before they were demolished

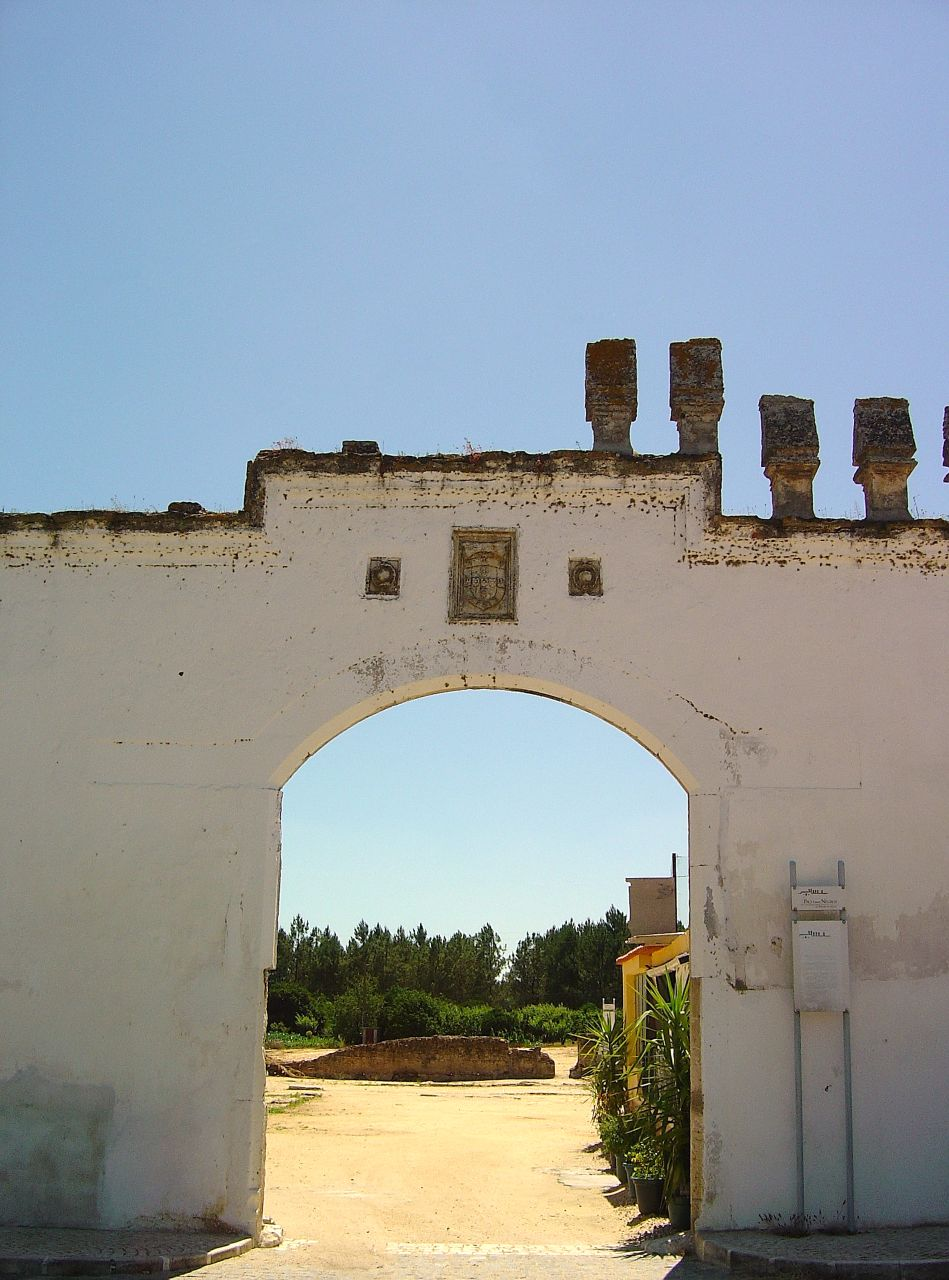
The portico in Manueline style is all what remains of the Paço dos Negros da Ribeira de Muge

The Royal Palace of Almeirim (Portuguese: Paço Real de Almeirim) was a residence of the Portuguese royal family in Almeirim, Portugal. It was constructed in the Middle Ages and expanded in the 16th century. It was a favoured residence to spend the winter times, contrary to Sintra in the summer. After being heavily damaged by the 1755 Lisbon earthquake, it was demolished in the 19th century.

== History ==
Almeirim is located close to Tagus river, offering easy access to Lisbon. Also, it has rich hunting grounds. For the kings of the Aviz Dynasty and their court, the palace became a favourite residence to spend their winter time, just as the nearby palace of Salvaterra de Magos. The palace received the nickname the 'Sintra of Winter'.

Between 1411 and 1423, the first (castellated) palace was constructed on orders of the first Aviz king John I (1357-1433). King Manuel I (1469-1521) expanded the palace. It became a large complex with next to the palace buildings a royal chapel, stables, vast vegetable gardens and pleasure gardens (which included a labyrinth in the 17th century). The width of the palace was more or less 100 meters, similar to the Ducal Palace of Vila Viçosa. The king spent long periods in Almeirim (e.g. almost the full year of 1510, part of 1513, Christmas 1514, and the months between October 1515 and May 1516). His successor, John III followed his example.

The palace was the scene of pompous parties and weddings, such as between Isabella of Portugal and her cousin Charles V, Holy Roman Emperor, King of Spain, Archduke of Austria, and Duke of Burgundy. Cardinal-King Henry (1512-1580) died at the palace of Almeirim on 31 January 1580, his 68th birthday. As there was no appointed successor, a war for succession started. In the end, Philip II of Spain (1527-1598) became the new king. Although, he did not inhabit the palace, he still spent large amounts to renovate the palace of his mother's dynasty.

Portuguese Restoration War established the House of Braganza as the new royal family and also brought new life to the palace. Especially King Peter II (1648-1706), who was fond of hunting, spent his time here. The 1755 Lisbon earthquake seriously damaged the palace. It was left almost in ruins and uninhabitable. Afterwards, it was not renovated or restored, as the royal treasury did not have sufficient funds and the nearby palace of Salvaterra de Magos was easier to restore as it was smaller compared to the Almeirim palace. In 1792, Prince John, as regent for Queen Maria I, ordered the demolition of the palace, which only happened in the 19th century, with the last wall being demolished in 1891.

=== Modern times ===
Today, nothing remains of the royal palaces of Almeirim. In memory of the palace, the municipality of Almeirim is considering restoring the portico of the royal palace in the garden of the Republic.

The palace contained a marble fireplace, which was once given to King Manuel by Pope Leo X in 1515. In 1898, it was transferred to the National Palace in Sintra and installed in the Magpies room (Sala das Pegas), where it still can be admired.

== Paço dos Negros da Ribeira de Muge ==
In 1512, King Manuel I constructed a second palace which was located a few kilometres from Almeirim, called the Paço dos Negros da Ribeira de Muge. ‘Negros’ in the name of the palace refers to the black who lived at the palace. The palace served as a secluded hunting lodge.

=== Modern times ===
Today, only a portico in Manueline style remains of the Paço dos Negros.

== Literature ==
- Bilou, Francisco (2016). "Uma empreitada decorativa no paço de Almeirim em 1511 e o pintor João de Espinosa, «mestre da pintura» do rei". Património Artístico no Alentejo Central. Obras, mestres e mecenas, 1516-1604 (in Portuguese). Lisbon: Edições Colibri. pp. 91–102.
- Dias Pacheco, Milton Pedro (December 2017). "Palaces on the Edge of the Atlantic The Architectural Reformation and the Space Ritualization of the Portuguese Royal Residences during the Reign of Philip I of Habsburg (1580–1598)". In Herbert Karner, Ingrid Ciulisová and Bernardo J. García García (ed.). The Habsburgs and their courts in Europe, 1400-1700: Between Cosmopolitism and Regionalism. Palatium e-Publication. pp. 55–71. ISBN 978-9460184833.
- Dias Pacheco, Milton Pedro (28 March 2020). "The Royal Journey of Succession to Portugal of King D. Filipe I of Portugal and the architectonic renovation of the palatine residences: the case of the Royal Palace of Lisbon (Paço da Ribeira)". Anales de Historia del Arte. ISSN 0214-6452.
