= Arimadanapura Palace =

Royal palace in Myanmar

Coordinates: 21.173518°N 94.86325°E

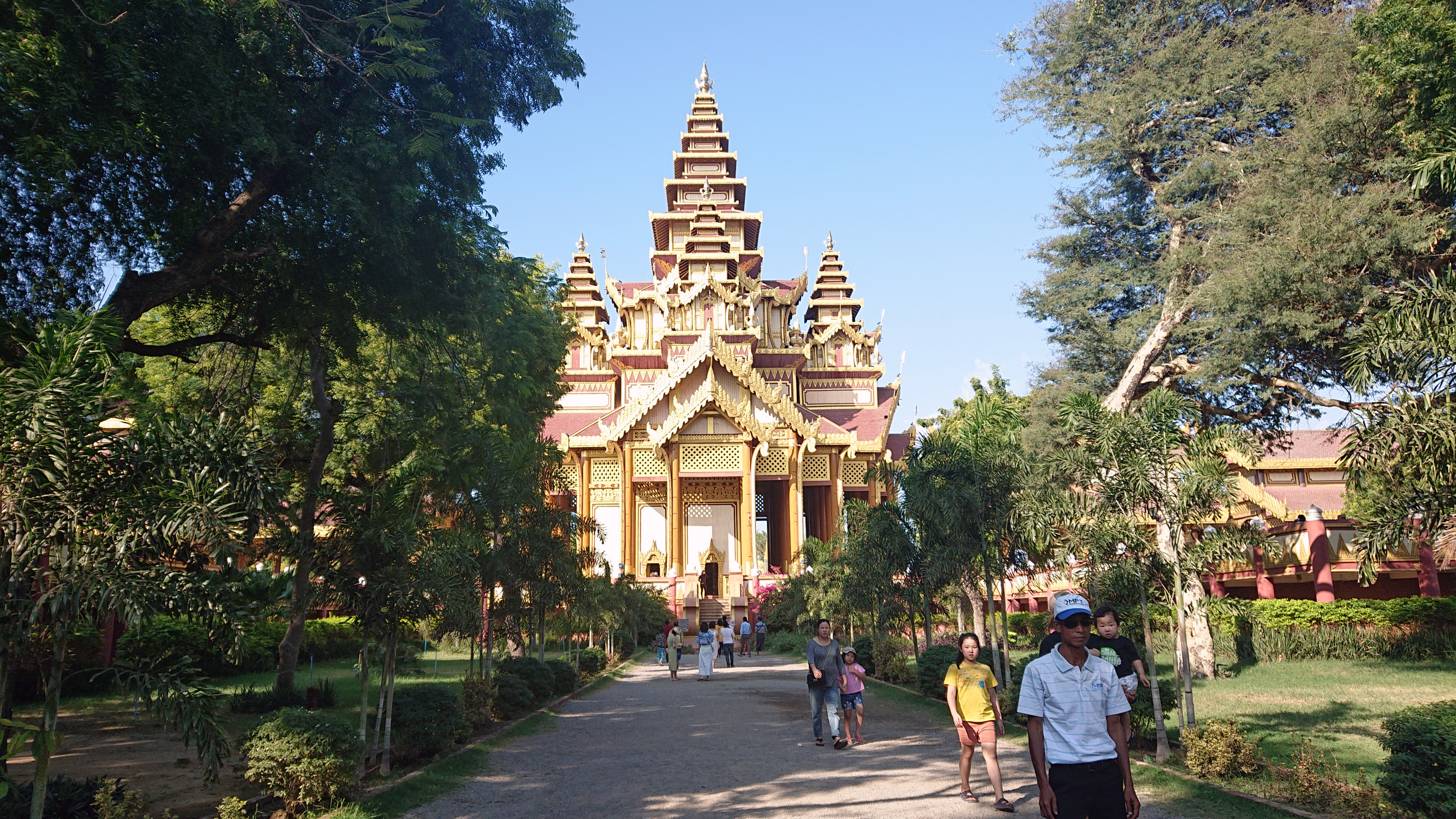
Reconstructed Bagan Golden Palace

Arimadanapura Palace (Burmese: အရိမဒ္ဒနပူရ နန်းတော်), also called the Bagan Golden Palace, is a royal palace in Bagan, Myanmar. The palace was originally built by King Anawrahta during the Pagan Dynasty. The palace's excavation site is located on the southern side of Bagan-Nyaung Oo Road. Between 1989 and 2003, it underwent excavation with government approval. Subsequently, in 2003, the palace was meticulously reconstructed, drawing design inspiration from remnants of mural art found in ancient Pagan temples. The restoration project was successfully completed in 2007, and it has since become a major tourist attraction.

The palace is situated near the Tharabha Gate, the main entrance to old Bagan and the Bagan Archaeological Zone. There are eight buildings on the palace site.
