= Istana Seri Akar =

Former royal residence in Kelantan, Malaysia

Coordinates: 6°07′52.5″N 102°14′16.4″E

The Istana Seri Akar, also written Istana Sri Akar, was a royal residence in Kota Bharu, Kelantan, Malaysia.

Formerly known as Istana Tengku Putri, this palace was built by Sultan Muhammad II of Kelantan in 1886 as a wedding gift for his granddaughter, Tengku Meriam Kembang Putri. The building was constructed out of wood. She was married to Tengku Putih, a Patani prince. The palace was renamed to Istana Seri Akar by Tengku Abdul Karid Janji, the last resident, who carried the title Seri Akar DiRaja. The istana was subsequently abandoned and fell into ruin and was probably demolished in the 1970s. Today only an empty plot remains and it is not sure if there are plans for reconstruction, even though photographs of the old palace exists.
