= Fusaro Lake =

Lake in Naples, Italy

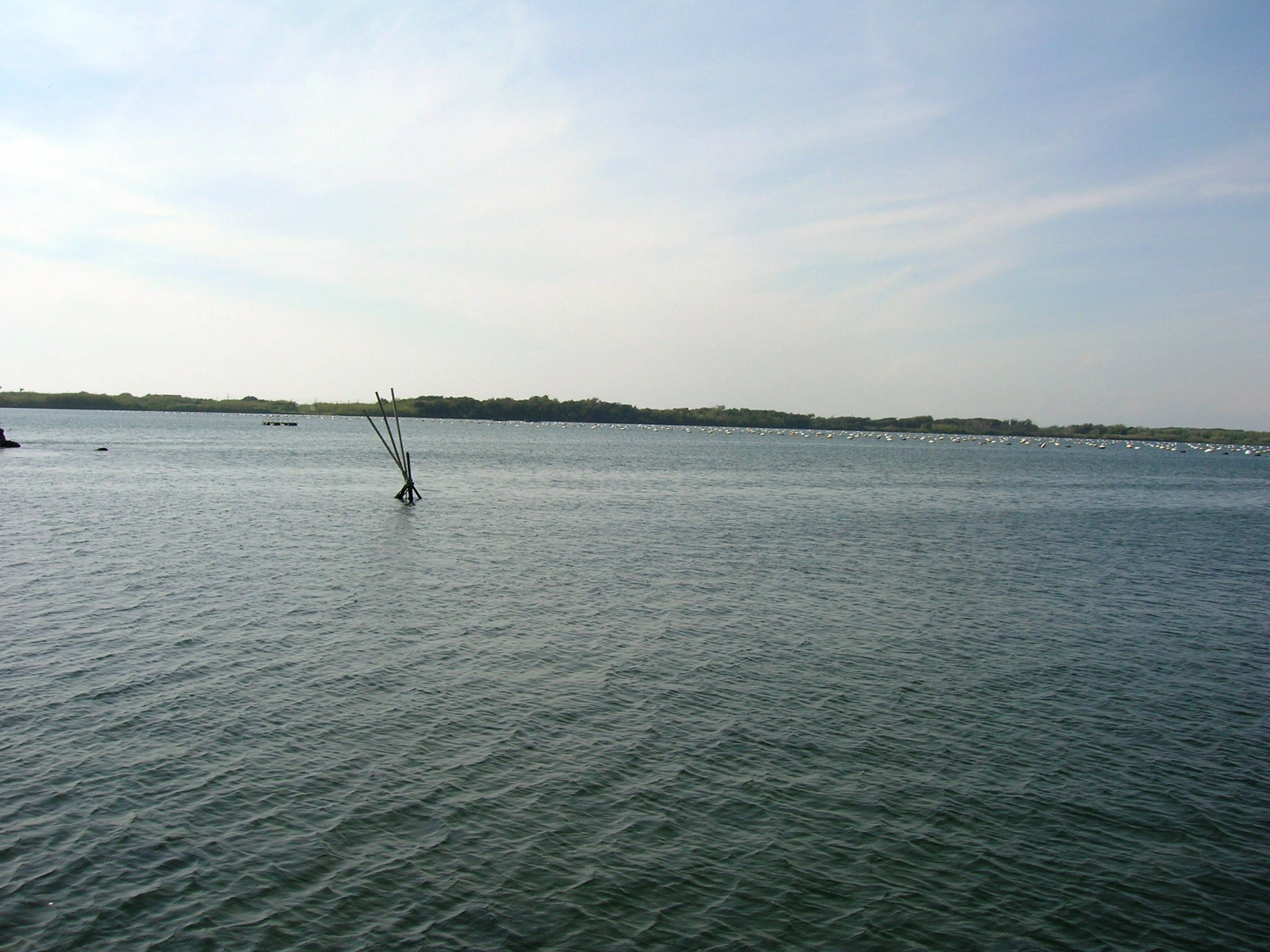
- Lake Fusaro

- Location within Italy
- Location: Naples, Italy
- Coordinates: 40°49′N 14°03′E
- Type: lake

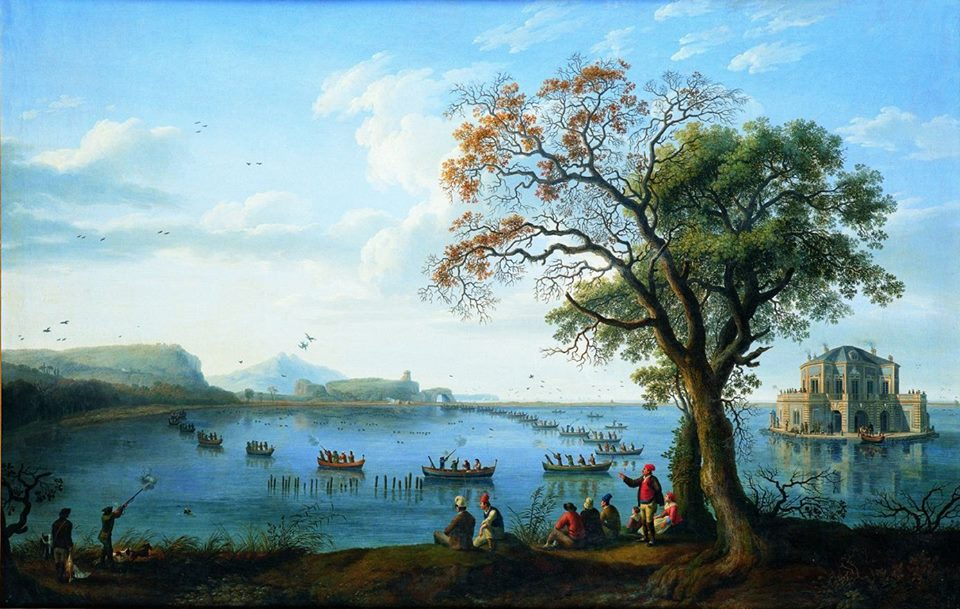
Hunt on the Fusaro, by Jakob Philipp Hackert (1873)

Lake Fusaro (Italian: Lago di Fusaro, Latin: Acherusia Palus, Ancient Greek: Ἀχερουσία λίμνη, romanized: Acherousia limne) is a lake situated in the province of Naples, Italy, in the territory of the comune of Bacoli. It is about 0.5 miles (800 m) from Baia, and about 1 mile (1.6 km) from the acropolis of Cumae. It is separated from the sea by a narrow coastal strip. It is a very unusual ecosystem of great interest, characterized by a variety of vegetation specific to the region.

== Geography ==
Thanks to the presence of fresh water springs, Lake Fusaro (known since the 3rd century B.C. as Acherusia Palus), has been known around the world for its great oysters. Mussels are also fished in quantity in the lake.

The lake is surrounded by a number of buildings, including the Royal Casina, the Ostrichina, the Grand Restaurant, the Pavilions (stables) and the Green Park, which were all part of a large business employing around 1,000 people at the beginning of the 20th century. Today, most of these buildings are not used for their original purpose, but still serve as tourist destinations.

== Casina Vanvitelliana ==
The Casina Vanvitelliana is an evocative little house located on a little island of Lago Fusaro, in the municipality of Bacoli. In 1752 the area of the Fusaro, at the time mostly inhabited, became the hunting and fishing reserve of the Bourbons, who hire Luigi Vanvitelli for the first works for the transformation of the place. When Ferdinando IV ascended to the throne, the interventions were completed by Carlo Vanvitelli, son of Luigi, who in 1782 created the Royal Casino of Caccia on the lake, not far from the shore.

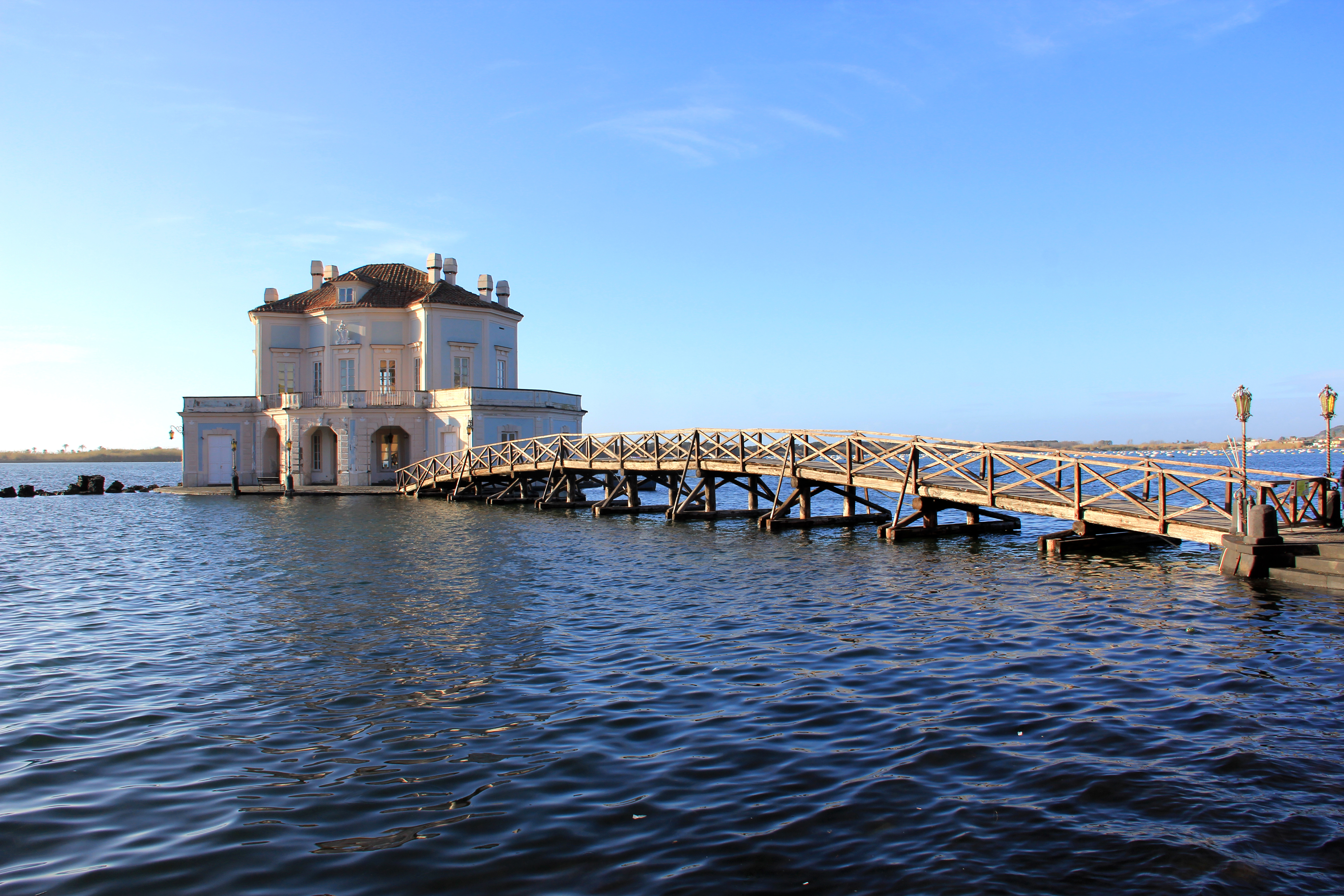
Casina Vanvitelliana and Fusaro lake

This building, known as Casina Vanvitelliana, was used as the residence of important guests, such as Francis II of Habsburg-Lorraine, who stayed here in May 1819. Inside the building were also welcomed Wolfgang Amadeus Mozart, Gioachino Rossini and, more recently, the President of the Republic Luigi Einaudi.

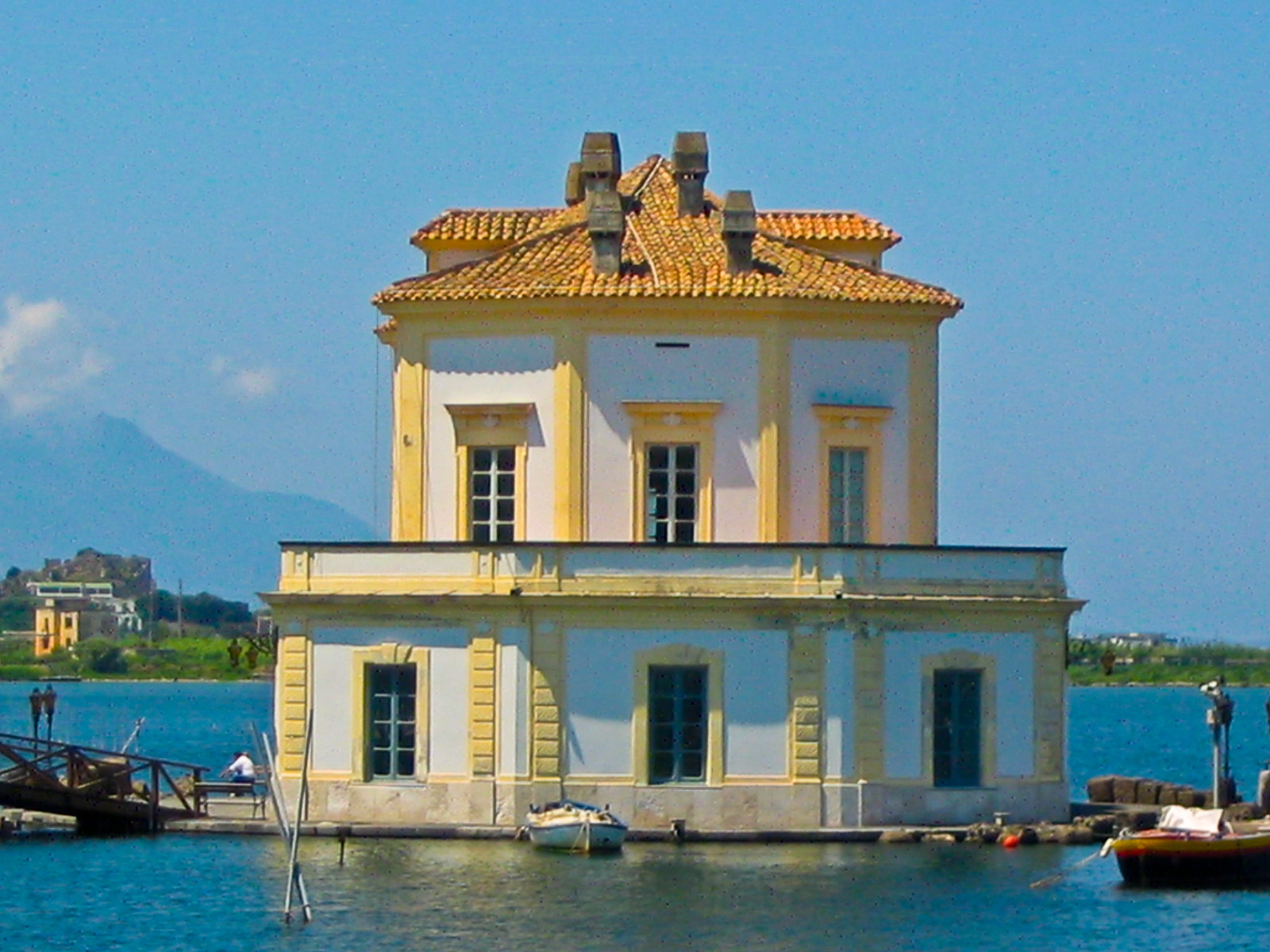
Casina Vanvitelliana, Bacoli (NA), Italy

From an architectural point of view, the Casina is one of the most refined eighteenth-century productions, somewhat similar to the conformation of the hunting lodge at Stupinigi, designed a few years before by Filippo Juvarra using plastic volumes and large windows. The building commissioned by the Bourbons in fact has a very articulated plan, composed of three octagonal bodies that intersect one at the top of the other, as a sort of pagoda, with large windows arranged on two levels; in addition a long wooden bridge connects the Casina to the lake shore. The Casina Vanvitelliana appears in the film Ferdinando and Carolina, by Lina Wertmüller, as well as in Lucio the smuggler by Lucio Fulci (1980).

It was also one of the locations of L'imbroglio nel lenzuolo (2009) with Maria Grazia Cucinotta.

== Notes ==
Attribution
