= Istana Perlis, Kuala Lumpur =

Palace in Kuala Lumpur, Malaysia

Istana Perlis
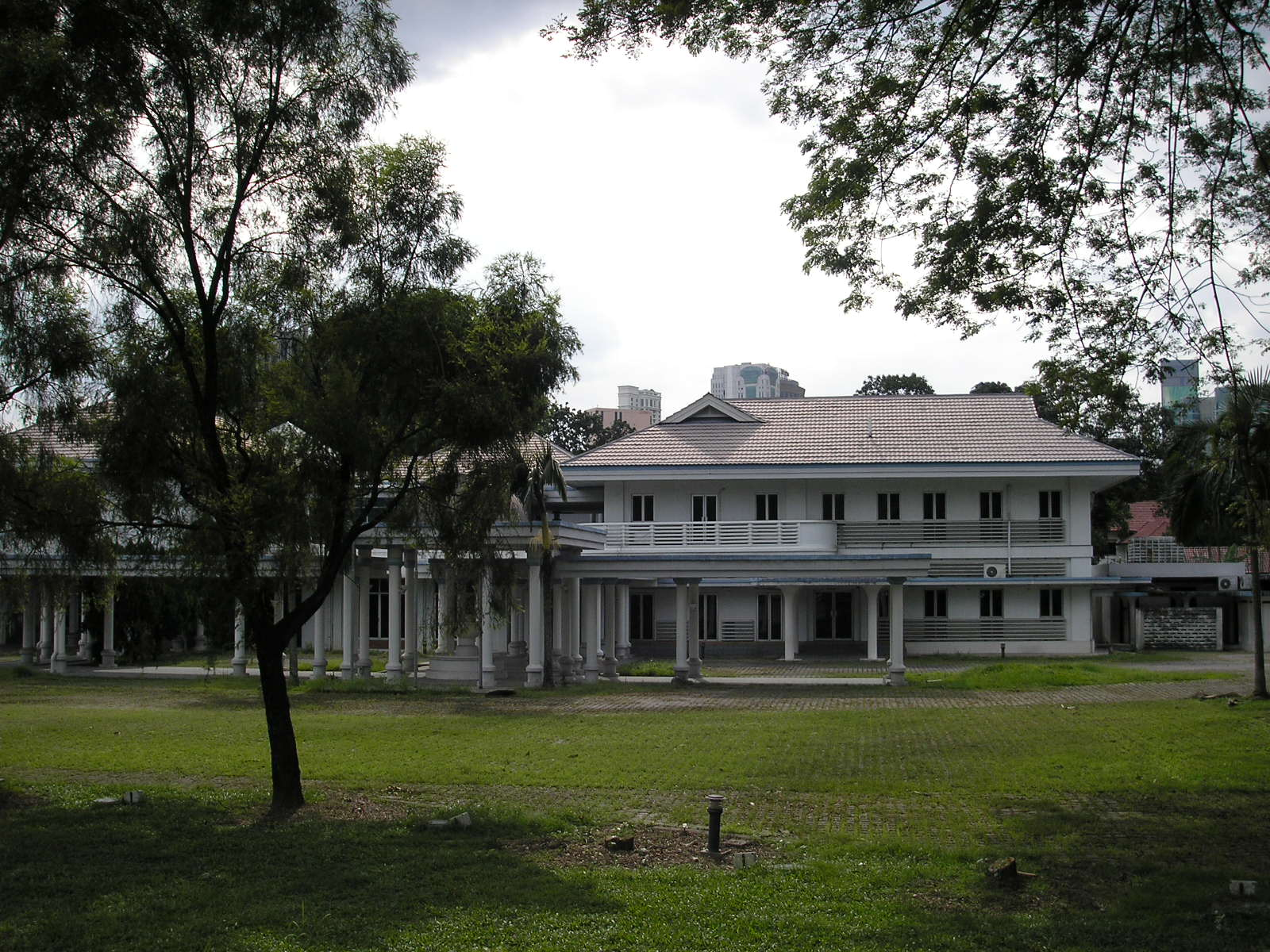
- Interactive map of the Istana Perlis area

General information
- Location: Kuala Lumpur, Malaysia
- Coordinates: 3°09′05.1″N 101°43′19.8″E

The Istana Perlis is the official city-residence of His Majesty, the Raja of Perlis and the royal family, in Kuala Lumpur. It is located at Jalan Tun Razak, close to the Royal Selangor Golf Club. Next to it is the Istana Terengganu.
