= Plumeria (Lao Royal Residence) =

- Plumeria
- Interactive map of the Plumeria area
- Former names: Plumeria

General information
- Type: former royal residence
- Location: Luang Phrabang, Laos
- Coordinates: 19.8851°N 102.1315°E
- Construction started: 1938

Technical details
- Floor count: 2

Plumeria was a former royal residence of Princess Khampieng and Prince Khamtan, a grandson of the 19th-century King Zakarine, in the city of Luang Prabang, Laos. Khampieng’s mother, Princess Vanthatmaly, built the 33-room boutique property, which is anchored by the 1938 residence. The royal couple raised their four children in this house while Khamtan served as prefect of the provinces of Vientiane, Luang Prabang, and Sainyabuli. He died in a plane crash; his wife lived in the house until her death.

In 2001, the house was converted into a hotel.
