= Royal Palace of Salvaterra de Magos =

Royal residence in Portugal

Coordinates: 39°01′37″N 8°47′35″W

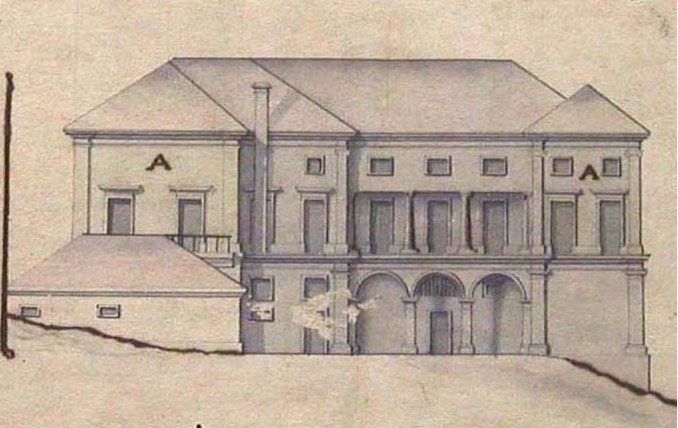
Elevation of the Royal Palace of Salvaterra de Magos by Carlos Mardel around 1750

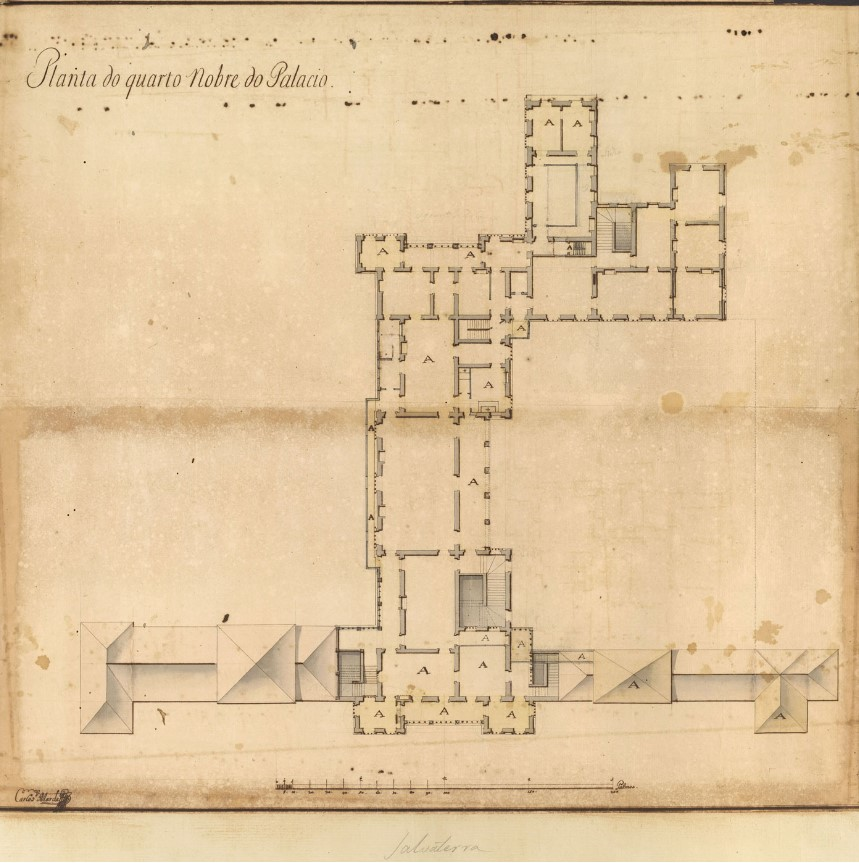
Plan of the principal floor of the Royal Palace of Salvaterra de Magos by Carlos Mardel around 1750

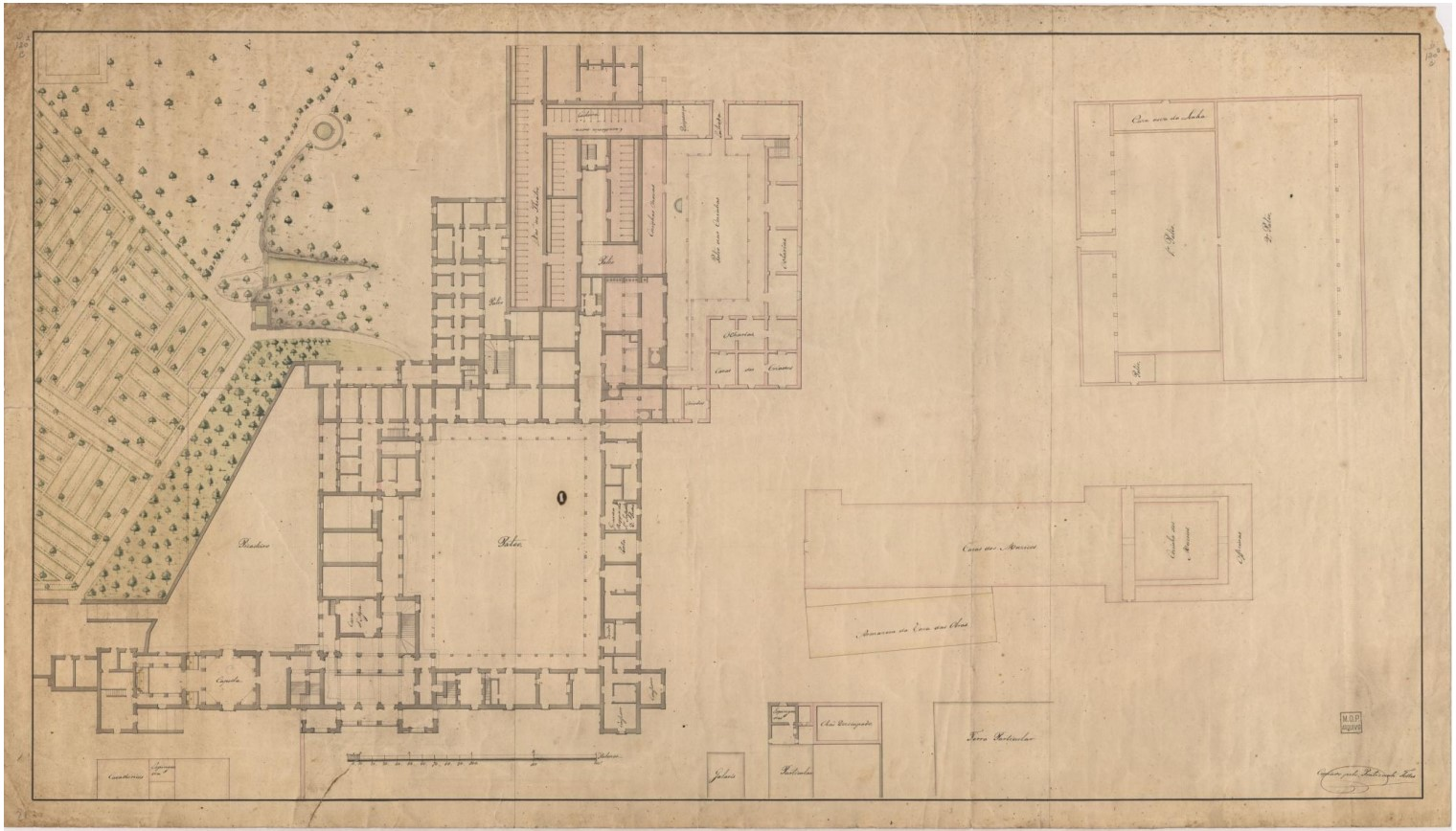
Plan of the ground floor of the Royal Palace of Salvaterra de Magos

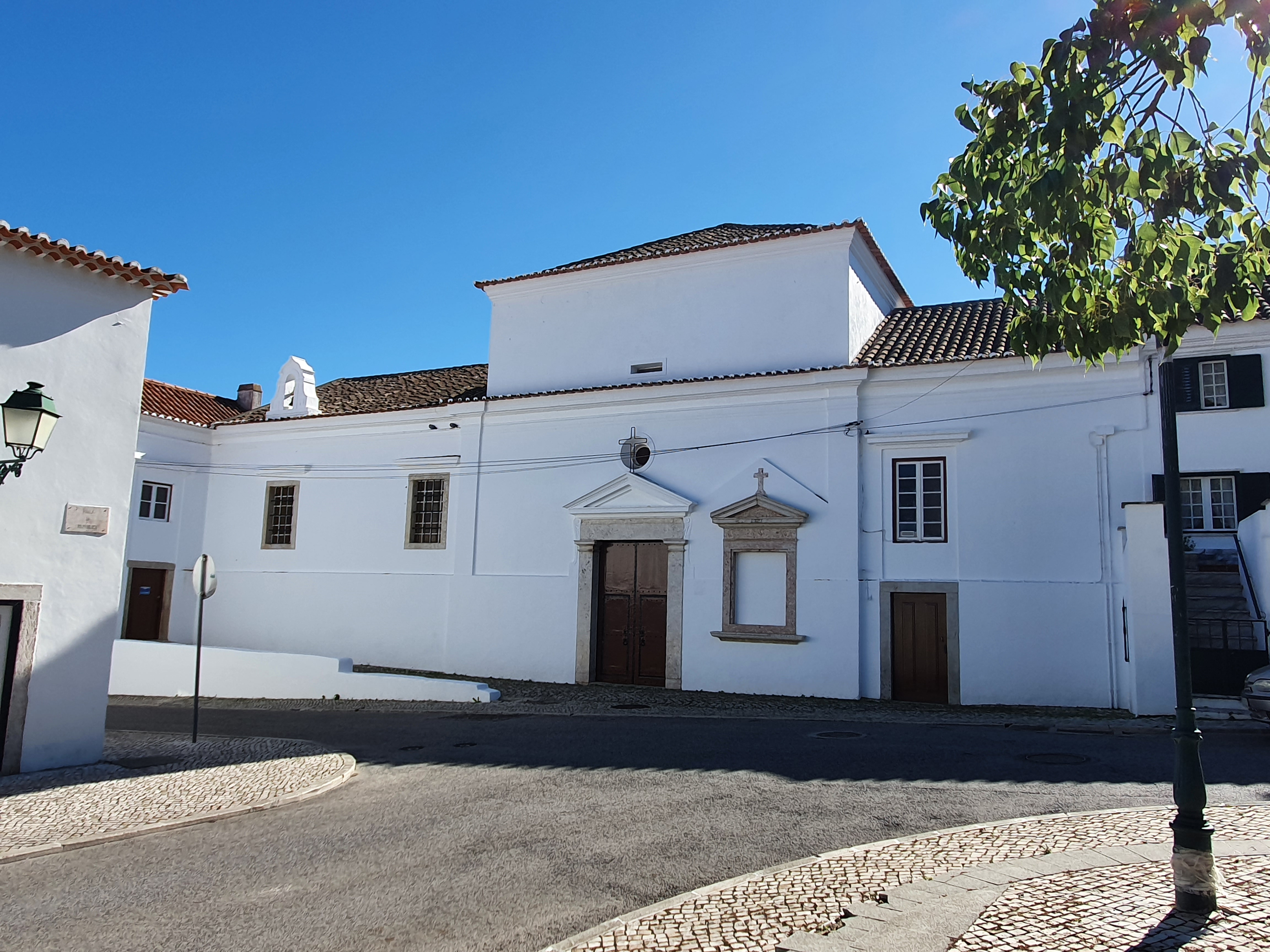
The former chapel of the Royal Palace of Salvaterra de Magos

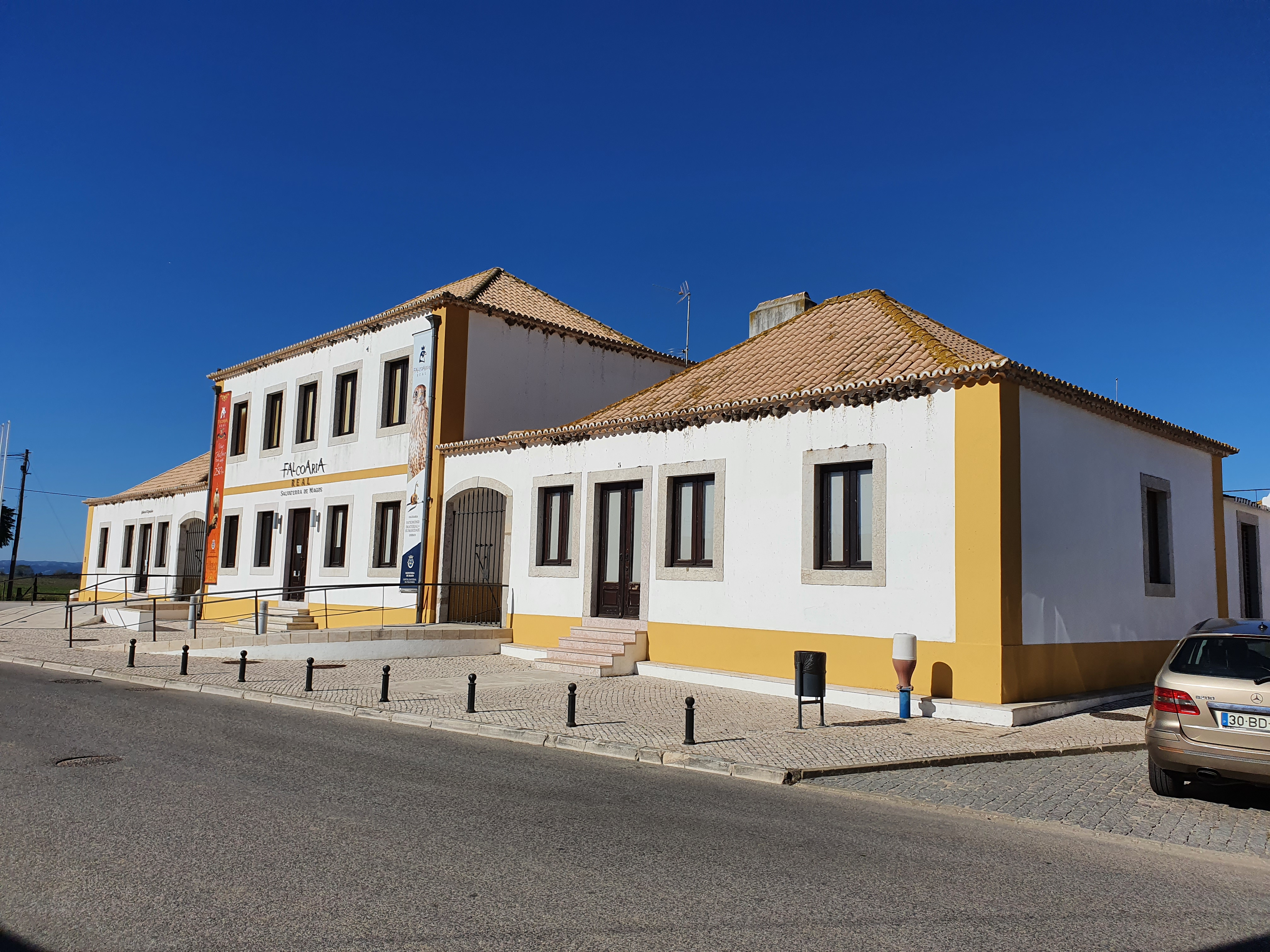
The falconry of the Royal Palace of Salvaterra de Magos, opened for the general public in 2009

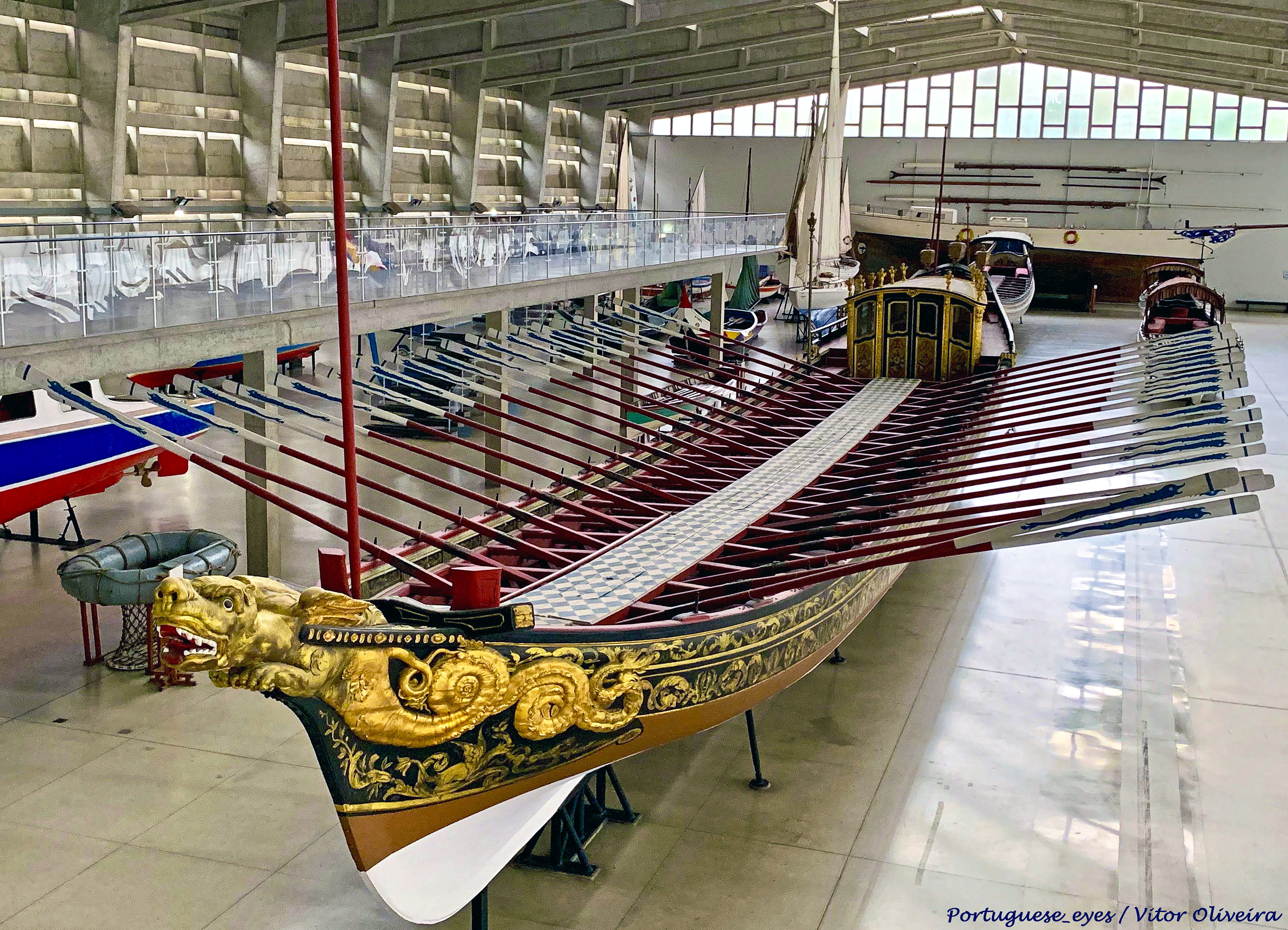
The king would arrive by barge from Lisbon over the Tagus river (example: the barge 'Galeota de Dona Maria I' in the Lisbon maritime museum)

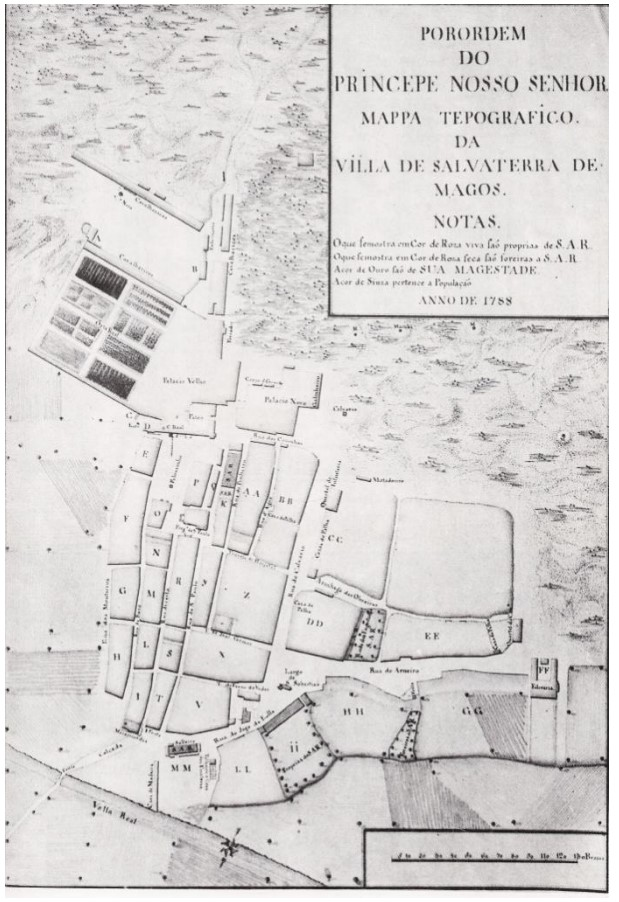
Map of 1788 showing the village of Salvaterra de Magos including the royal palace, its gardens and annexures

The Royal Palace of Salvaterra de Magos (Portuguese: Paço Real Salvaterra de Magos) was a royal residence and hunting lodge of the Portuguese royal family in Salvaterra de Magos, Portugal. It was constructed in the 16th century, a favored residence in the 18th century, and was destroyed by fire in 1828. Today, only the chapel and the falconry remain.

== History ==
On 2 April 1383, a marriage contract was signed in Salvaterra de Magos betrothing the ten year old Beatrice of Portugal (1373–1420) to the widowed King John I of Castile (1358–1390), which suggests that already in the Middle Ages there was a royal palace in Salvaterra de Magos. However, documentary references about this 'old' palace are not abundant.

In the start of the 16th century, King John III of Portugal (1502–1557) awarded the estate of Salvaterra de Magos to his brother prince Luís of Portugal, Duke of Beja (1506–1555), who constructs (or rebuilds) a new palace with sumptuous gardens. After his death, the palace is inherited by his son António, Prior of Crato (1531–1595), who was king of Portugal for 33 days in 1580, and it becomes part of the Portuguese royal domains and estates. The palace is expanded by King Philipp II in 1590 with help of the architect Filippo Terzi aided by the Portuguese architect Baltazar Álvares, who was also responsible for other royal palaces in Almeirim and Santarém. Further expansion happens under King Peter II (1648–1706), who was fond of hunting, starting in 1690. His renovations give the palace a baroque touch, which still can be seen in the chapel today.

The 18th century was the heyday of the royal palace of Salvaterra de Magos. It was a favored palace, which was visited by the royal family on many occasions, primarily during the winter up to Carnival. They often would come by barge from the Ribeira Palace in Lisbon over the Tagus river to Salvaterra de Magos (the barges used can now be visited in the maritime museum of Lisbon). Also, the palace was further expanded and remodeled. King Joseph I (1714–1777) orders the construction of an opera house. The architect Carlos Mardel assisted with the design. It is inaugurated on 21 January 1753 with the opera ‘Didone Abandota’. In the next 39 years between 1753 and 1792, numerous opera performances were to follow (according to some 64 different shows). Also, Carlos Madel created a new falconry building. Falconry at Salvaterra de Magos had its heyday in 1750s with the arrival of a dozen Dutch falconers from Valkenswaard, who were to instruct the local falconers with the art of Dutch falconry. The 1755 Lisbon earthquake seriously damaged the palace. However, reconstruction and renovation works started soon in the years following. A new bullfighting arena was constructed next to the royal palace in 1775.

At the end of the 18th century, the royal family staid less frequent at the palace. And with the departure of the royal family to Rio de Janeiro, Brazil in 1807, due to the French invasion, the decay of the palace started. A fire caused serious damage to the palace in 1817, saving only the chapel, the opera house and the falconry. And another fire finally destroyed the palace in 1828. The estate is transferred from the royal domains to the Portuguese State in 1849. The last palace walls collapse during an earthquake in 1858. Much of the remaining buildings, such as the falconry, were sold at public auctions.

=== Bullfighting accident ===
The earl of Arcos, son and heir of the 4th Marquis of Marialva was fighting a bull on horseback when the animal wounded his horse. The young man fell, was kicked by the bull and killed. The Marquis himself, then around 70 years of age, jumped from the royal cabin that he shared with the king, drew his sword and killed the animal. After this incident, King Joseph I ordered that the horns of the bulls are severed and covered in a way that they do not present sharp points.

== Modern times ==
The only remaining palace buildings are the chapel and the falconry. The local municipality has constructed an amphitheater on the place of the old arena in 1997. The falconry which was acquired by the municipality in 1980s has been reconverted into a falconry again and has been opened to the general public in 2009.

On 8 September 2024, a new municipality museum was opened in Salvaterra de Magos dedicated to the local history and heritage. The exhibition addresses the royal palace and includes a 3d video presentation how the royal palace looked like in the 18th century.

== Literature ==
- Aline Gallasch-Hall de Beuvink (2016). O Real Teatro de Salvaterra de Magos – A Reconstrução de uma Memória. Lisbon: Caleidoscópio. p. 112. ISBN 978-9896584092.
- Joaquim Manuel da Silva Correia e Natália Brito Correia Guedes (2017). O Paço Real de Salvaterra de Magos (2ª Edição). Lisbon: Livros Horizonte. p. 272. ISBN 978-9722407236.
- Milton Pedro Dias Pacheco (December 2017). "Palaces on the Edge of the Atlantic The Architectural Reformation and the Space Ritualization of the Portuguese Royal Residences during the Reign of Philip I of Habsburg (1580–1598)". In Herbert Karner, Ingrid Ciulisová and Bernardo J. García García (ed.). The Habsburgs and their courts in Europe, 1400-1700: Between Cosmopolitism and Regionalism. Palatium e-Publication. pp. 55–71. ISBN 978-9460184833.
- Milton Pedro Dias Pacheco (28 March 2020). "The Royal Journey of Succession to Portugal of King D. Filipe I of Portugal and the architectonic renovation of the palatine residences: the case of the Royal Palace of Lisbon (Paço da Ribeira)". Anales de Historia del Arte. ISSN 0214-6452.
