= Nikšić Royal Palace =

Building in Montenegro

Coordinates: 42°46′9.4″N 18°57′5.9″E

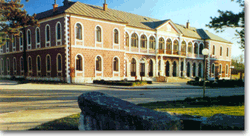
Nikšić Royal Palace

Nikšić Royal Palace, also referred to as King Nikola's Palace is a former royal residence in Nikšić, Montenegro. It is located in the city center near town park. The two-storied palace was built by king Nikola I Petrović-Njegoš in 1890. However, it was rarely used. Currently, it houses the Zavičajni Muzej (County Museum), documenting the historical development of the city.
