= Royal Palace, Wrocław =

Royal Palace
- Pałac Królewski
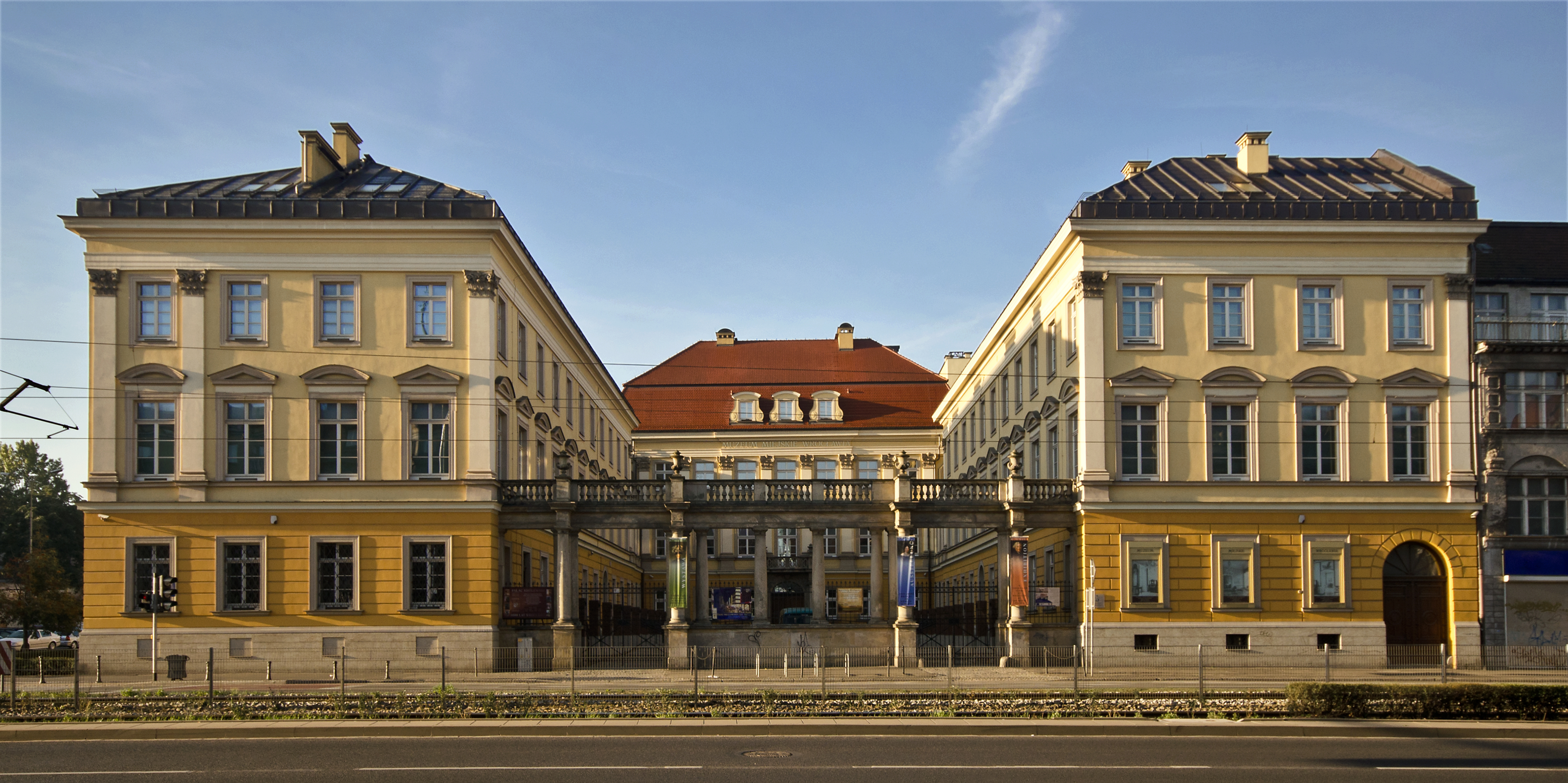
- Main facade on ul. Kazimierza Wielkiego

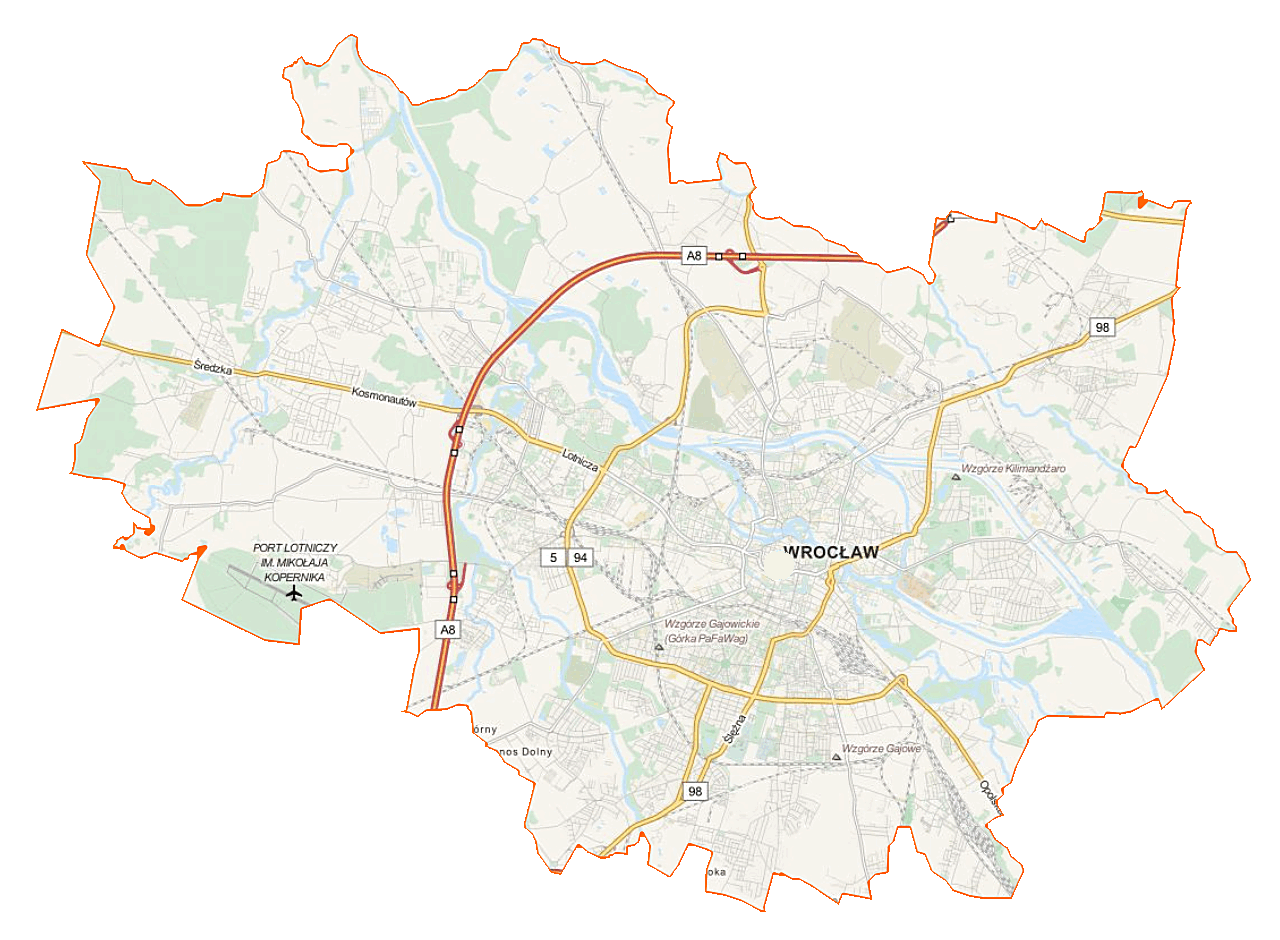
- Location within Wrocław
- Former names: Stadtschloss

General information
- Type: Palace residency
- Architectural style: Baroque, Rococo
- Location: Wrocław, Poland
- Coordinates: 51°6′27″N 17°1′43″E
- Current tenants: Wrocław City Museum
- Completed: 1717
- Demolished: May 1945
- Client: Heinrich Gottfried von Spätgen, Frederick the Great

The Royal Palace (Polish: Pałac Królewski; German: Stadtschloss) is a palace in Wrocław, Poland. Originally a palace of the Prussian monarchy, it now houses the city museum.

== History ==
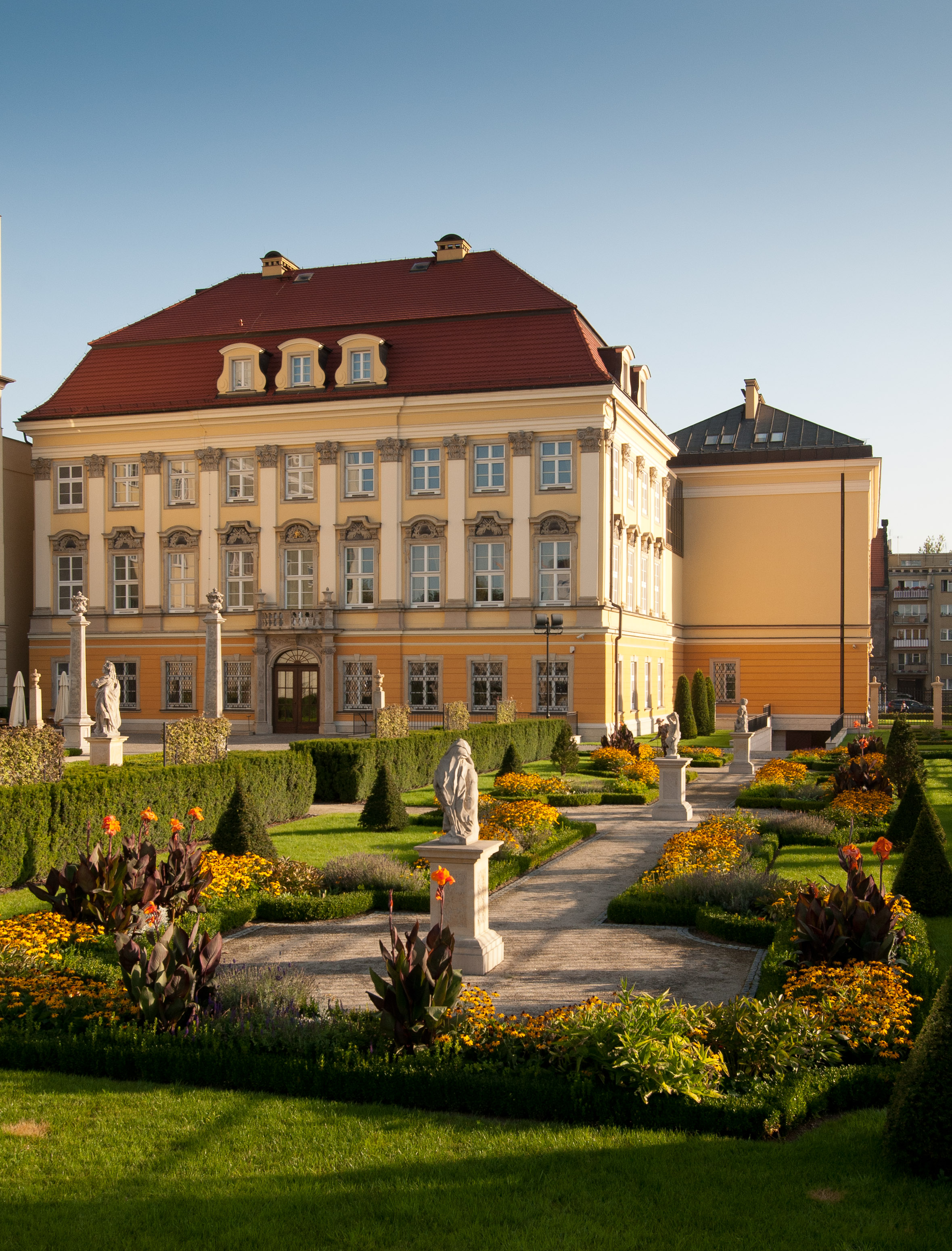
Royal gardens

Initially a Baroque palace of Heinrich Gottfried von Spätgen, chancellor of Bishop Francis Louis of Neuburg, it was built in 1717 in a Viennese style. In 1750, after Prussia took control over Silesia from Austria in the First Silesian War, the palace was purchased by the Prussian king Frederick the Great and was converted into his residence. The palace was extended from 1751 to 1753 in the Baroque style with Rococo interiors designed by the royal architect Johann Boumann. Boumann's additions included a transverse wing with a festive hall, throne hall and Frederick the Great's private quarters.

The successor of Frederick the Great, who died in 1786, was his nephew Frederick William II of Prussia (1744–1797). He performed remodelling of the royal palace according to the design of Karl Gotthard Langhans (1732–1808). The remodelling took place in 1795 to 1796 in the classical style. As a result, the wings surrounding the northern courtyard, a new staircase and utility rooms were added.

In March 1813, during the War of the Sixth Coalition with Napoleon, King Frederick William III of Prussia announced two famous manifestos: "To My People" and “To My Military Commanders”. In April 1813, in the Yellow Living Room of the Palace, the king proclaimed the Iron Cross as a war medal.

In the middle of the 19th century, drawing on a Florentine Renaissance style, architect Friedrich August Stüler added a new southern wing (1844–1846) and a new courtyard wings along with the gate and railing (1858). In 1918 the palace was donated to the city of Breslau. On 20 September 1926 the Palace Museum (Schlossmuseum) was opened, displaying an exposition devoted to Frederick the Great, reconstruction of original interiors, and a collection of Silesian art.

== 1945-present ==
In May 1945 the palace was heavily damaged during the siege of the city at the end of the Second World War. Breslau was transferred from Germany to Poland after the war and renamed Wrocław. In the 1960s the palace was partially demolished, while the remaining wings were adapted to host the Archaeological Museum (until 1999) and the Ethnographic Museum (until 2004). In 2008 a renovation was finished and a new museum was established, presenting 1,000 year history of Wrocław.

== Gallery ==
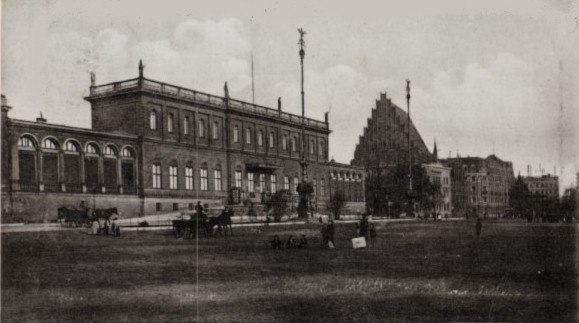
backside of the palace from the 19th century, destroyed in World War II

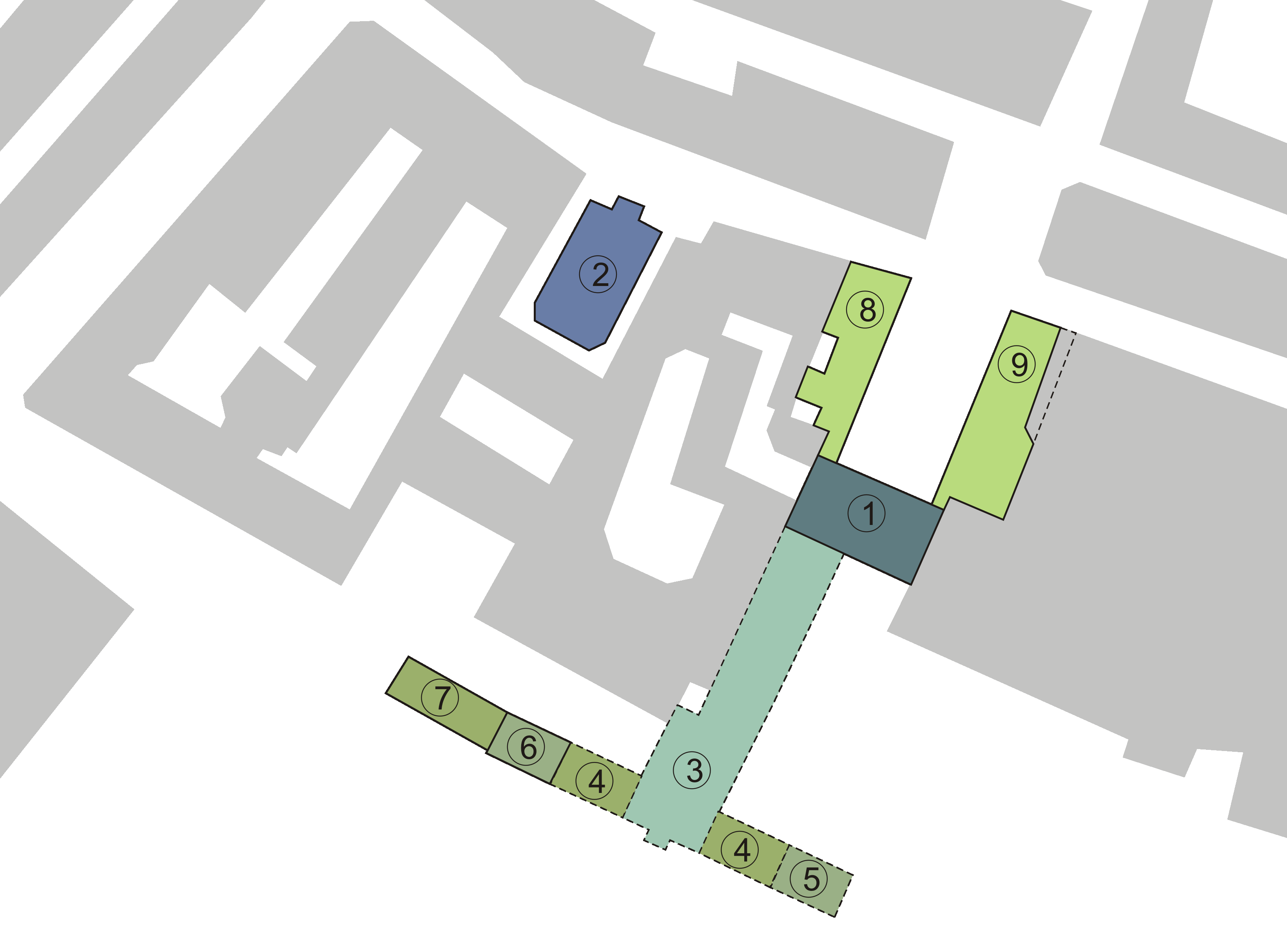
Layout of the palace ensemble in Wrocław:
1. Central part (baroque, preserved)
2. Royal Court church
3. South-West Wing (destroyed)
4. South Wing (destroyed)
5. Eastern pavilion (destroyed)
6. Western pavilion (preserved)
7. Kitchen Wing (preserved)
8. North-West Wing (preserved)
9. North-East Wing (preserved and extended after World War II)

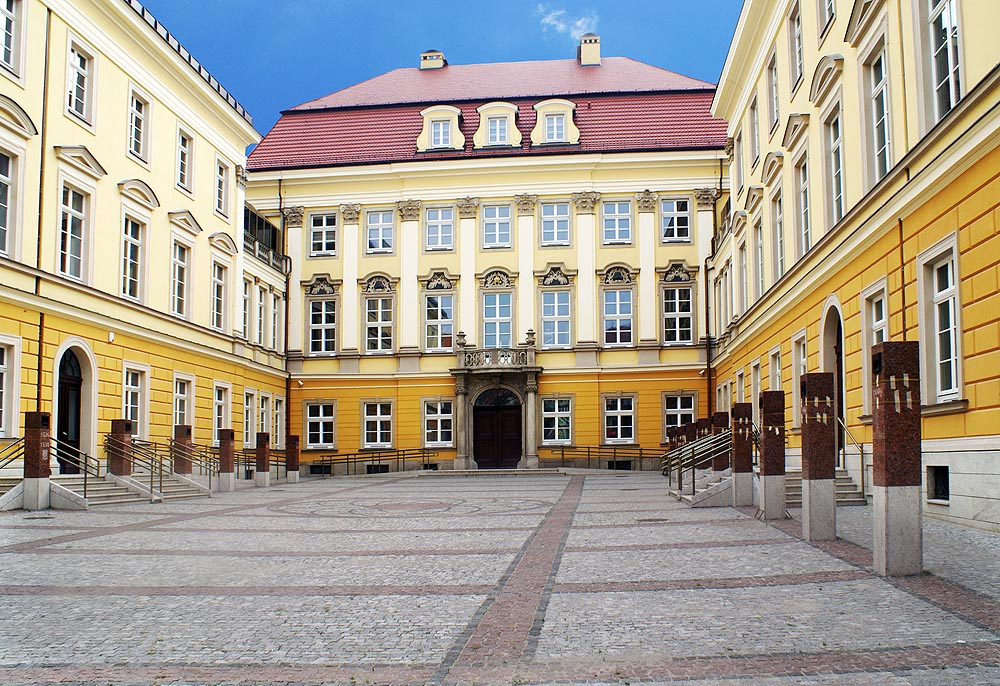
Inner courtyard
