= List of palaces in Malaysia =

List of palaces located in Malaysia

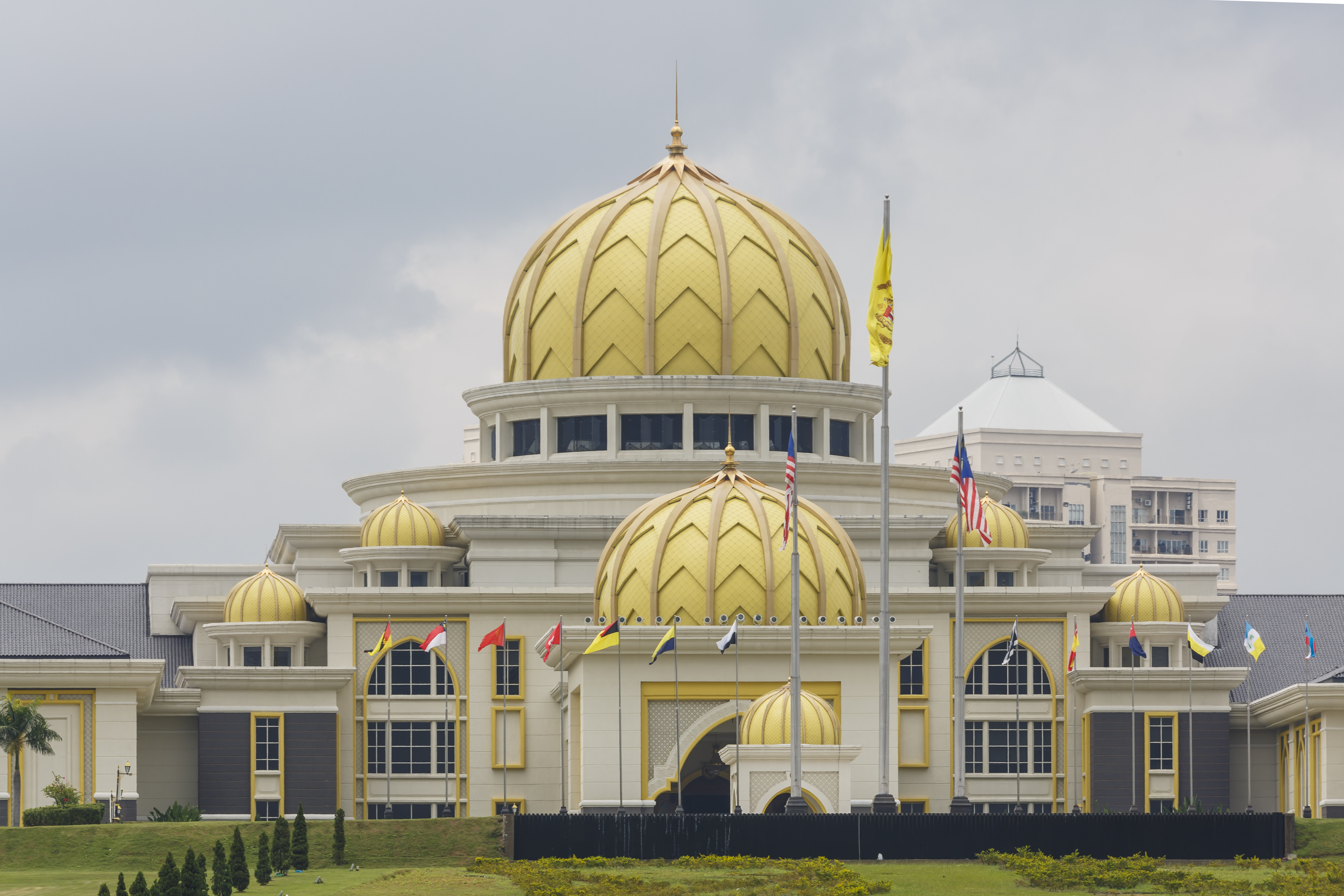
Front facade of the new Istana Negara, the Official Residence of His Majesty Seri Paduka Baginda Yang di-Pertuan Agong of Malaysia and Her Majesty Seri Paduka Baginda Raja Permaisuri Agong of Malaysia

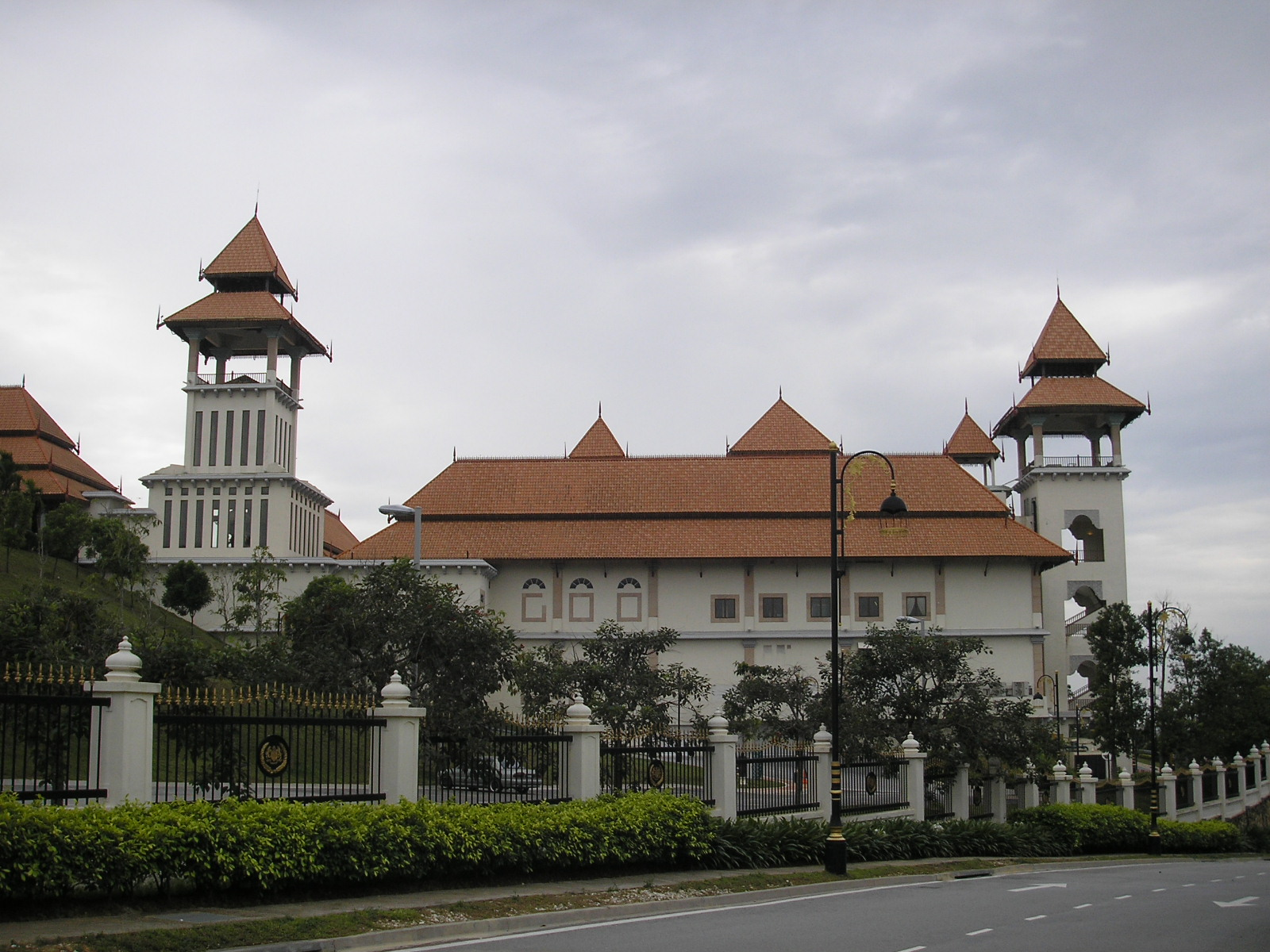
Istana Melawati, Putrajaya, the secondary national palace of His Majesty King of Malaysia

List of palaces located in Malaysia.

== Official palaces of the Yang di-Pertuan Agong ==
- Istana Negara (Jalan Istana) – Former royal residence of the King of Malaysia (old palace), Kuala Lumpur (currently served as Royal Museum of Malaysia)
- Istana Negara (Jalan Tuanku Abdul Halim) – Royal residence of the King of Malaysia (grand palace), Kuala Lumpur
- Istana Melawati – Second national palace of Malaysia (southern palace), located in the centre of Presint 1 Putrajaya

== Istana Hinggap ==
Istana Hinggap can be categorized into two types. First, there are the city palaces located in Malaysia's capital Kuala Lumpur. It functions as the royal residence for the respective Sultans, Raja or Yang di-Pertuan Besar in Kuala Lumpur. There are nine Istana Hinggap built respectively for the nine Kings of Malaysia. Second, there are the temporary/leisure palaces when the Sultan, Raja or Yang di-Pertuan Besar goes to visit their territory inside/outside their own state. Some of them even have Istana Hinggap outside Malaysia.

=== List of Istana Hinggap in Kuala Lumpur ===
- Istana Hinggap Perlis – Raja of Perlis palace at Jalan Eaton
- Istana Hinggap Kedah – Sultan of Kedah palace at Jalan Kedah
- Istana Hinggap Perak – Sultan of Perak palace at Jalan Persekutuan,
- Istana Hinggap Selangor – Sultan of Selangor palace at Jalan Sultan Salahuddin
- Istana Hinggap Negeri Sembilan – Yang di-Pertuan Besar of Negeri Sembilan palace at Jalan Persekutuan
- Istana Hinggap Johor – Sultan of Johor palace at Jalan Persekutuan
- Istana Hinggap Pahang – Sultan of Pahang palace at Bukit Kewangan
- Istana Hinggap Terengganu – Sultan of Terengganu palace at Jalan Tun Razak
- Istana Hinggap Kelantan – Sultan of Kelantan palace at Jalan Wickham

== List of Istana for the constituent states ==
=== Perlis ===
- Istana Arau – Official palace for the Raja of Perlis. This palace was built in 1905 during the reign of Tuanku Raja Syed Alwi Jamalullail.
- Istana Fauzana – The Raja of Perlis' residential palace in Kangar
- Istana Kenangan Indah – located in Repoh, previously official residence of the late Tuanku Syed Putra Jamalullail and his consort. After Syed Putra Jamalullail died and Syed Sirajuddin took the throne, this palace has become the official palace for the Raja Perempuan Besar Perlis.

=== Kedah ===
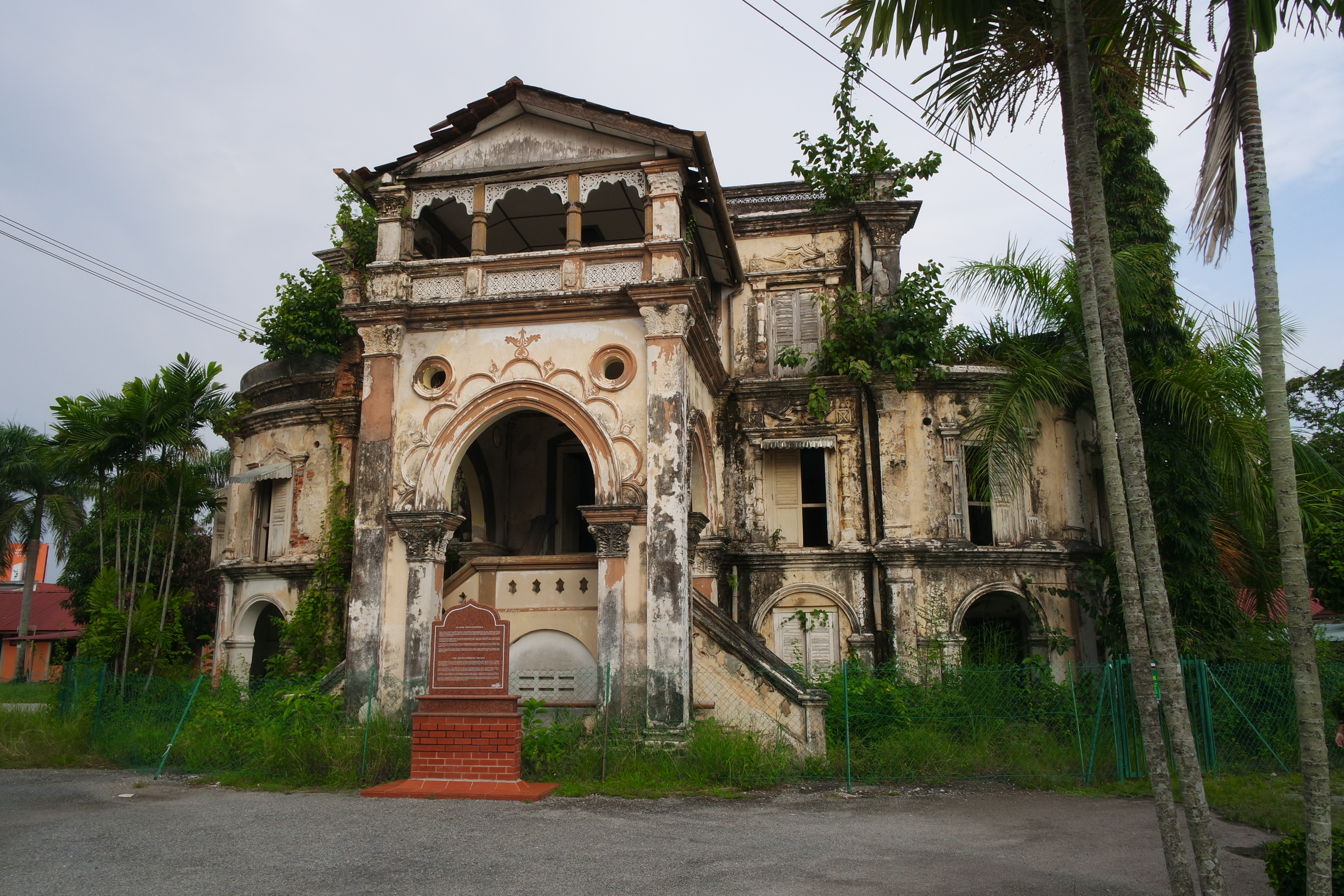
Istana Sepachendera is left abandoned after Che Sepachendera died

- Istana Anak Bukit – Official palace for the Sultan of Kedah.
- Balai Besar – Located in Alor Setar facing Masjid Zahir (Zahir Mosque) and built in 1735, it was almost destroyed twice in 1770 (attacked by Siamese army) and 1821 (attacked by Bugis army). The palace is supported by 42 main pillars now serves as Kedah Royal Museum.
- Istana Kuning – Old residential palace for the Sultan of Kedah.
- Istana Pelamin – Or Istana Kota Setar. Currently the Kedah Royal Museum. Built in 1732 by Sultan Muhammad Jiwa Zainal Adilin Muazzam Shah.
- Istana Bukit Malut – Royal palace located in Langkawi Island, Kedah.
- Istana Kuala Chegar – Built in 1920 by Sultan Abdul Hamid Halim Shah (1882–1943).
- Istana Seri Pelangi – Located at Jalan Tunku bendahara, Alor Setar. Currently, the widow of the late Sultan Abdul Halim of Kedah, Che Puan Besar Kedah, (formerly known as Sultanah Haminah) resides here.
- Istana Sepachendera – Built in 1882 by Sultan Abdul Hamid Halim Shah (1882–1943) for his wife, Che Sepachendera.
- Istana Nur Iman - Located at Jalan Lumba Kuda.
- Istana Kesuma - Official royal residence of the Raja Muda (Crown Prince) of Kedah.
- Istana Lubuk Pusing - Build by Sultan Abdul Hamid Halim Shah, destroyed during the second World war.
- Istana Pumpong - Built by Tunku Abdul Aziz, Crown Prince of Kedah during the reign of Sultan Abdul Hamid and was demolished in the 1970s.

=== Pulau Pinang ===
- Seri Mutiara – The official residence of the Yang di-Pertua Negeri, the Governor of Penang. This palace was built in 1890
- Istana Kedah – Palace owned by the Sultan of Kedah in Pulau Pinang

=== Perak ===
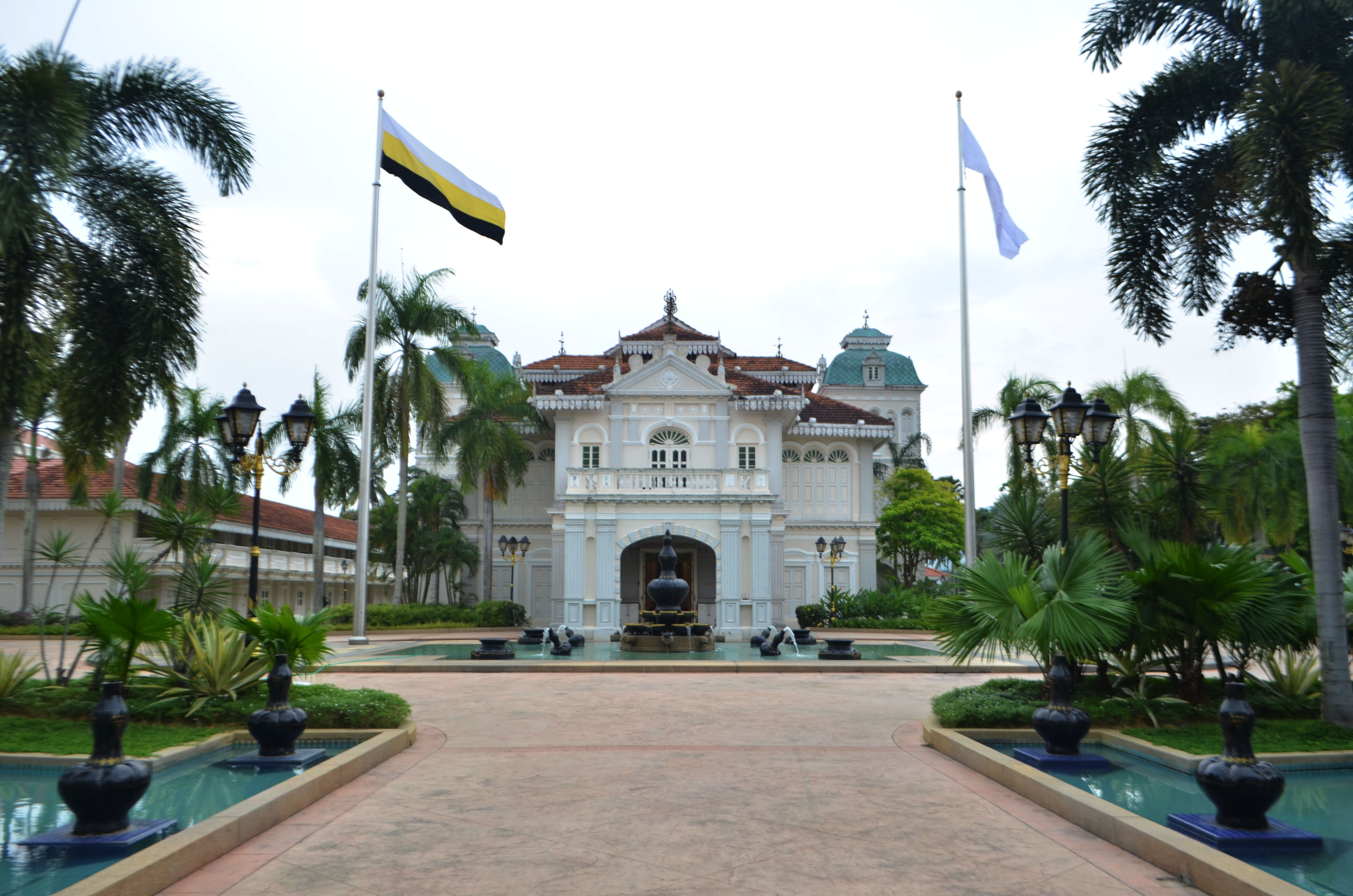
Istana Hulu in Kuala Kangsar, Perak

- Istana Cempaka Sari – Residential palace of Sultan Nazrin in Ipoh Sultan Nazrin Muizuddin Shah ibni Sultan Azlan Muhibbuddin Shah
- Istana Hulu – The palace, designed with a mixture of Western neo-classical and Islamic styles, was built in 1903 for the 28th Sultan of Perak.
- Istana Iskandariah – The official residence of all the Sultans of Perak who have been installed since its completion in 1933. The palace is named after Sultan Iskandar Shah (1918–38) who initiated its construction.
- Istana Idrisiah – Or Istana Idris or Istana Negara Perak built by Sultan Idris Murshidul Aadzam Shah ibni al-Marhum Raja Bendahara Alang Iskandar in 1895. In 1931 the palace was demolished to give way for the construction of the new Istana Iskandariah.
- Istana Kenangan – The Perak Royal Museum was built as a royal residence in 1926. It is an amazing architecture which was built from woods without a single nail.
- Istana Kinta – Royal palace in Ipoh, Perak
- Istana Raja Muda – Official palace for Crown Prince of Perak in Ipoh. Current Raja Muda of Perak is Duli Yang Teramat Mulia Raja Muda Perak Raja Jaafar ibni Almarhum Raja Muda Musa
- Istana Raja Muda Lama – The former official residence for Crown Prince of Perak in Teluk Intan. It was built in 1922 for Almarhum Raja Muda Abdul Aziz (later become Sultan Abdul Aziz). The palace was abandoned in 1988 when DYTM Raja Muda Raja Dr. Nazrin Shah moved to Istana Tetamu in Ipoh
- Istana Raja Di Hilir – Raja Di Hilir is the second in line for Perak's throne after the Raja Muda. Current Raja Di Hilir is Duli Yang Amat Mulia Raja Di-Hilir Perak Raja Iskandar Dzulkarnain ibni Almarhum Sultan Idris Iskandar Al-Mutawakkil Alallahi Shah II Afifurlah who also the son-in-law of the late Sultan Abdul Halim of Kedah.
- Kellie's Castle was meant to be a home away from home for Scottish Planter, William Kellie Smith in the 19th century in Batu Gajah.
- Istana Riswin – residence of the Crown Princess of Perak, Raja Nazhatul Shima.
- Istana Firuz – residence of the Raja Di Hilir of Perak, Raja Iskandar Dzulkarnain Ibni Sultan Idris Iskandar Al- Mutawakkil Alallahi Shah II Afifurlah.
- Istana Billah

=== Selangor ===
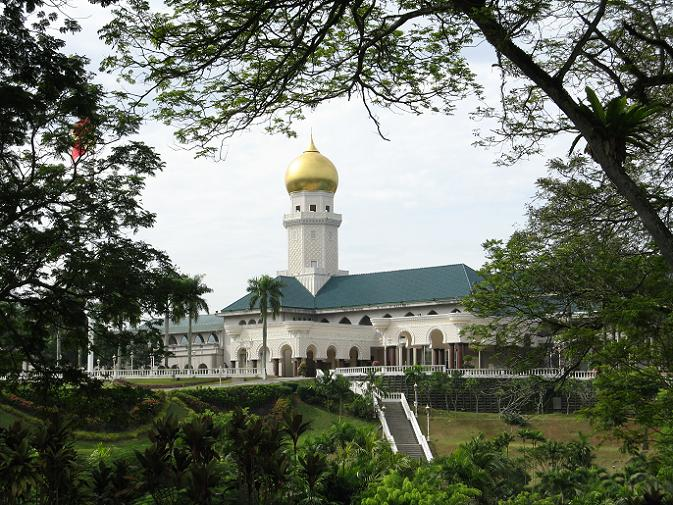
Striking golden dome at Istana Alam Shah

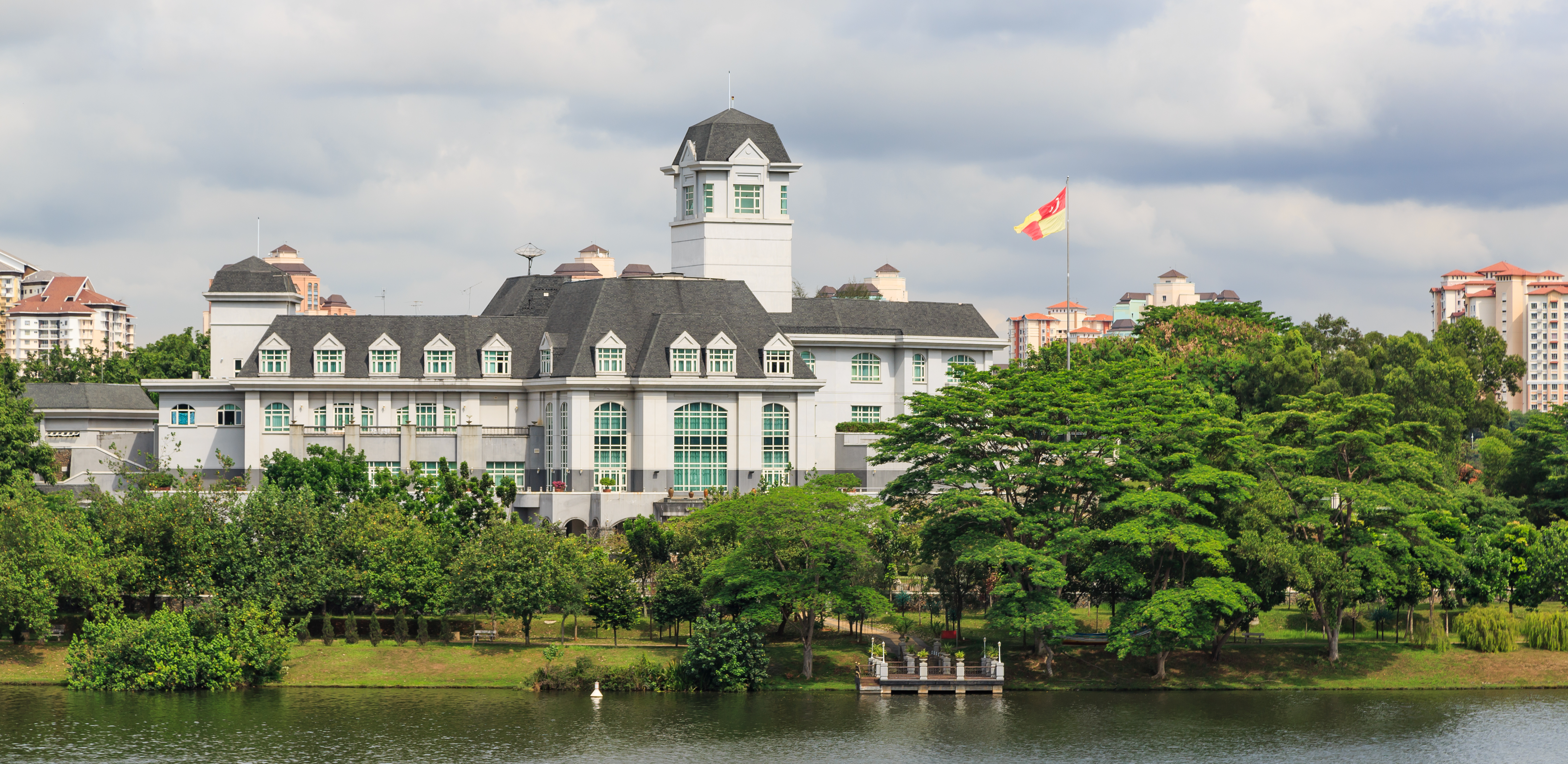
Istana Darul Ehsan facing Putrajaya lake

- Istana Alam Shah – The Sultan of Selangor's official palace in Klang
- Istana Bandar – A big palace made of wood and marble built for the fifth Sultan of Selangor, Sultan Alauddin Sulaiman. This palace is also known as Istana Temasya.
- Istana Bukit Kayangan – The Sultan of Selangor's state palace in Shah Alam
- Istana Darul Ehsan – Royal palace in Putrajaya
- Istana Mestika – The official residence of the crown prince of Selangor, also in Shah Alam
- Istana Mahkota Puri – Built in 1899 in Klang. This palace has been demolished to make way for the building of the new Istana Alam Shah.
- Istana Pantai Bahagia – Resting palace of Sultan Selangor in Morib
- Istana Jemaah – Currently serves as school (Kolej Islam Sultan Alam Shah) located in Klang not far from Istana Alam Shah. This palace is named after the Queen of Selangor who was also the second Raja Permaisuri Agong (Supreme Queen) of Malaysia, Tengku Ampuan Jemaah.

=== Negeri Sembilan ===
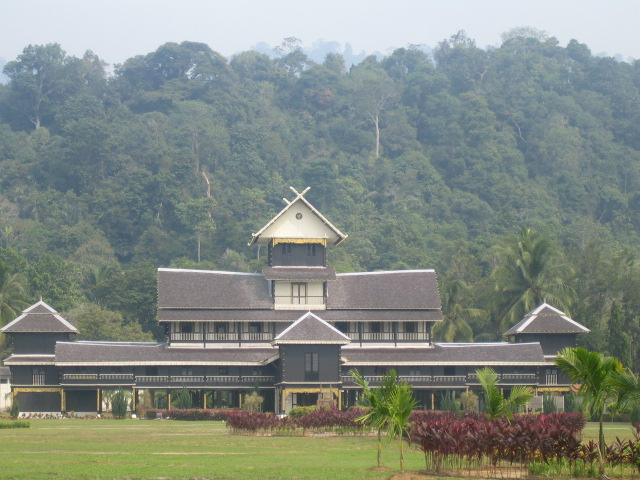
Istana Seri Menanti (royal museum)

- Istana Ampang Tinggi – Commissioned by the 5th Yamtuan of Negri Sembilan, Yamtuan Ulin Ibni Almarhum Yamtuan Hitam. The palace was built between 1865 and 1870 at Ampang Tinggi ("High Dam") in Kuala Pilah
- Istana Sri Menanti – Istana Seri Menanti was the official residence of the Negeri Sembilan royal family until 1931 and was turned into a Royal Museum in 1992
- Istana Besar Seri Menanti – Official Palace for Yang Dipertuan Besar of Negeri Sembilan.
- Istana Hinggap Seremban – Residential palace of Yang Dipertuan Besar of Negeri Sembilan in Seremban
- Istana Baroh – Located in Seri Menanti
- Istana Salatin – Currently the residential palace for Tuanku Tunku Ampuan Najihah binti Almarhum Tunku Besar Burhanuddin

=== Melaka ===
- Istana Melaka – the official residence of the Yang di-Pertua Negeri, the Governor of Melaka in Bukit Beruang
- Seri Melaka – built in the 17th century. Currently functioning as Muzium Tuan Yang Terutama since 1996 Muzium Tuan Yang Terutama
- Istana Kesultanan Melaka – Malacca royal museum. The current palace is smaller replica of the original palace.

=== Johor ===
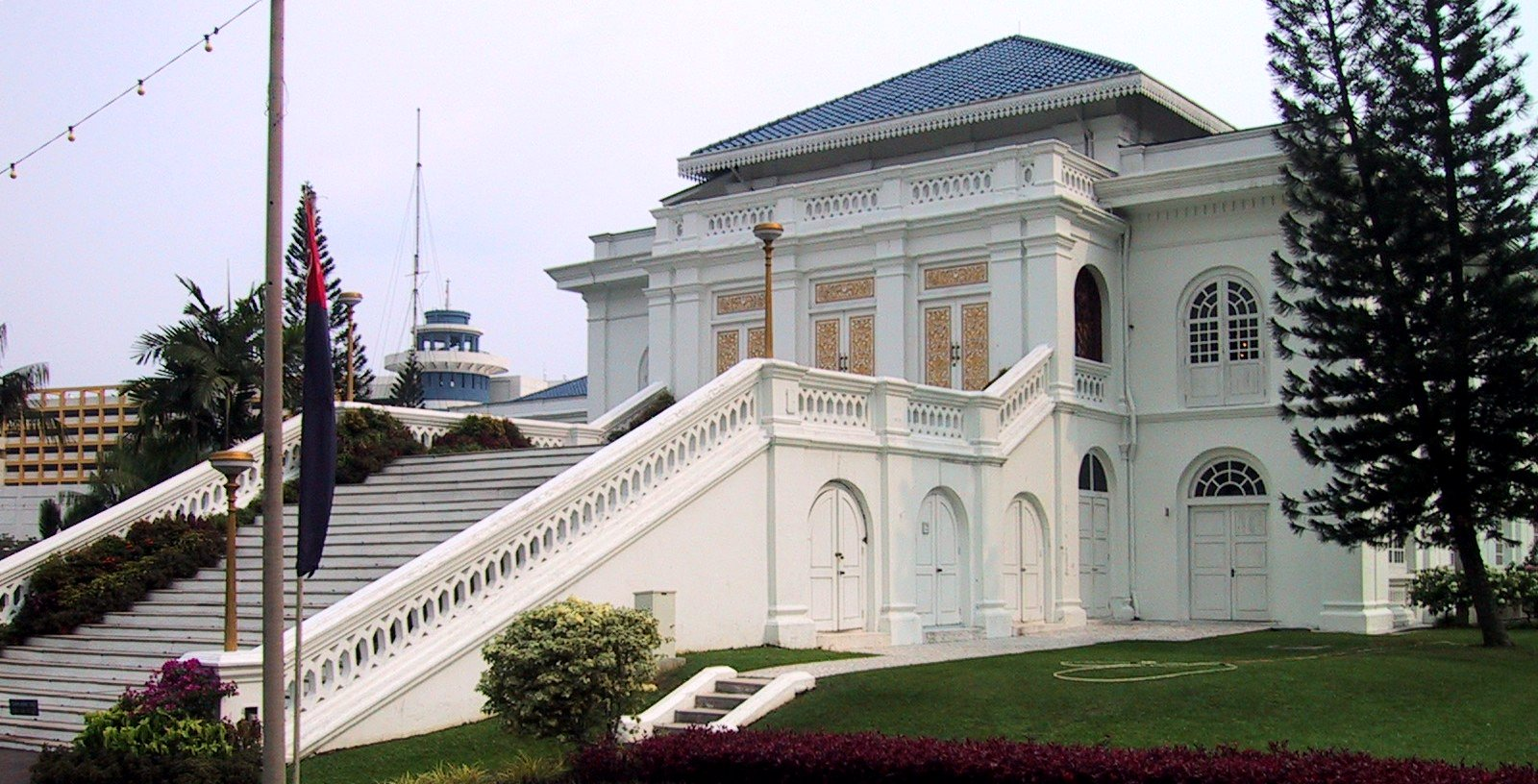
Istana Besar Johor Bahru

- Istana Besar – A royal palace of the Sultan of Johor which is located in Johor Bahru. The palace is opened to public as Royal Museum of Johor but will be closed for public during royal events.
- Istana Bukit Serene – The Sultan of Johor's palace in Bukit Serene, Johor built in 1933 and completed in 1939. The palace has a tower of 35 meters height facing Danga Bay.
- Istana Bukit Pelangi – The royal palace of the Tunku Mahkota (crown prince) of Johor
- Istana Pasir Pelangi – The royal palace of the Royal Family of Johor
- Istana Tanjong – Resting palace of the Sultan of Johor which is located in Muar
- Istana Hinggap – Resting palace of the Sultan of Johor which is located in Segamat
- Istana Flintstones – Resting palace of the Sultan of Johor which is located in Mersing
- Istana Sri Lambak – Resting palace of the Sultan of Johor which is located in Kluang

=== Pahang ===
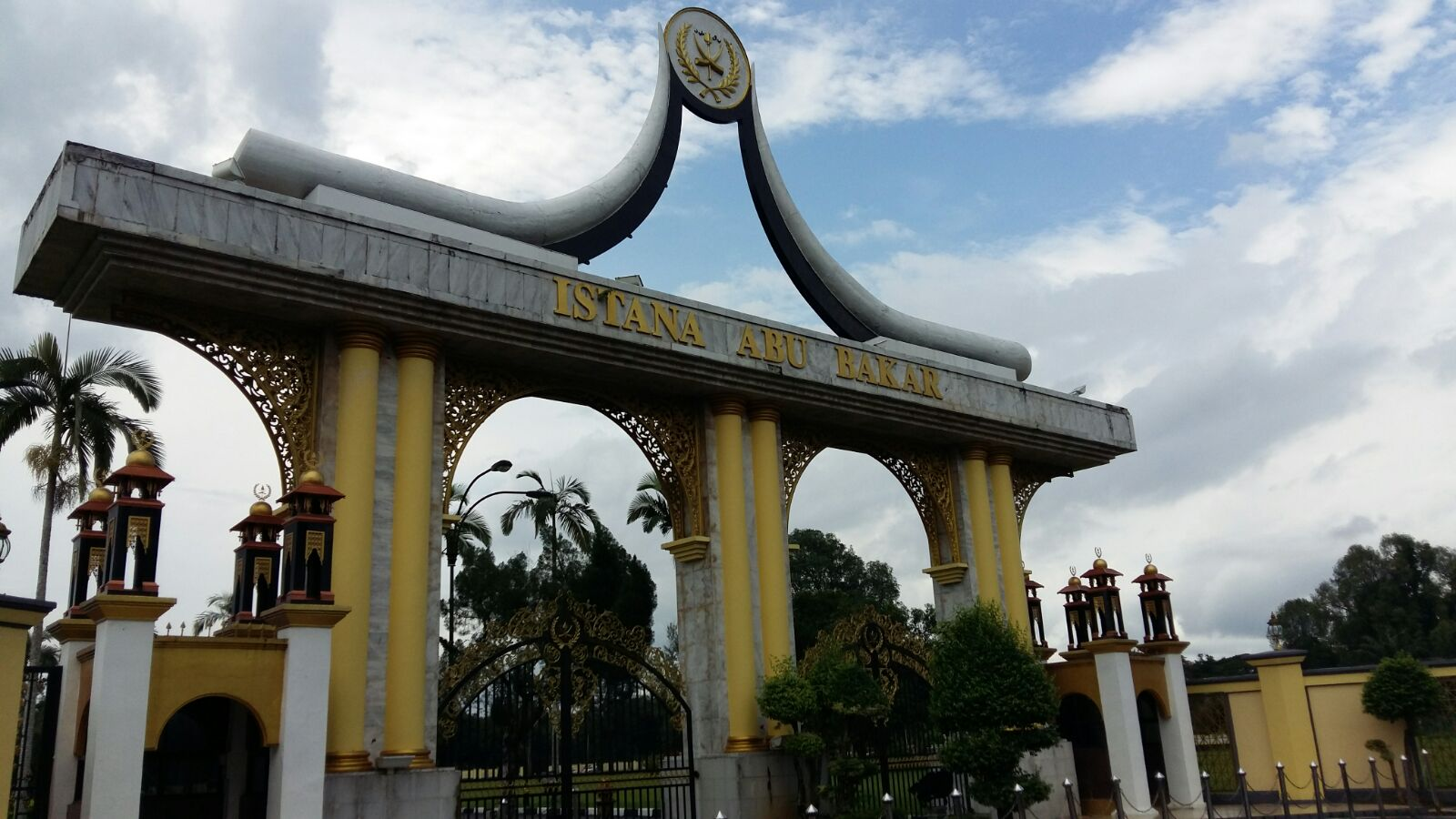
Abu Bakar Palace main gate.

- Istana Abu Bakar – The Sultan of Pahang's official Palace in Pekan
- Istana Abdul Aziz – Official palace for Crown Prince of Pahang, KDYTM Tengku Mahkota Pahang Tengku Abdullah Al-Haj Ibni Sultan Haji Ahmad Shah Al-Musta’in Billah dan KDYTM Tengku Puan Pahang. the name of the palace is derived from combination of Tengku Abdullah (crown prince of Pahang) and Tunku Azizah (crown princess of Pahang)
- Istana Mahkota – Located at Jalan Telok Cempedak, Kuantan
- Istana Mangga Tunggal – Built in 1920 during the reign of Sultan Abdullah Al-Mu’tassim Billah. the palace is named after a single mango tree that grow in the palace compound.
- Istana Sri Angkasa – Royal palace in Cameron Highlands
- Istana Sri Udara – Royal palace in “Bandar Ikan Patin” Temerloh
- Istana Leban Tunggal – Completed in 1937, this palace is owned by Almarhum YAM Tengku Besar Pahang II, Tengku Sulaiman ibni Almarhum Sultan Ahmad Al-Mu’azzam Shah. currently the public library at Pekan
- Istana Kota Beram – Currently royal museum of Pahang
- Istana Hinggap Kuala Lipis – Previously the residence for British officer since 1926. In 1948 it is converted into official residence for Menteri Besar of Pahang. In 1955 the residence is converted into a palace.
- Istana Melati – Built in 1966 in Kampung Mengkasar, Pekan for YH Dato’ Maria Menado who at that time the wife of Al-Marhum Sultan Abu Bakar Ri’ayatuddin Al-Mu’adzam Shah Ibni Al-Marhum Sultan Abdullah Al-Mu’tasim Billah. The palace was built to replace Balai Gambang

=== Terengganu ===
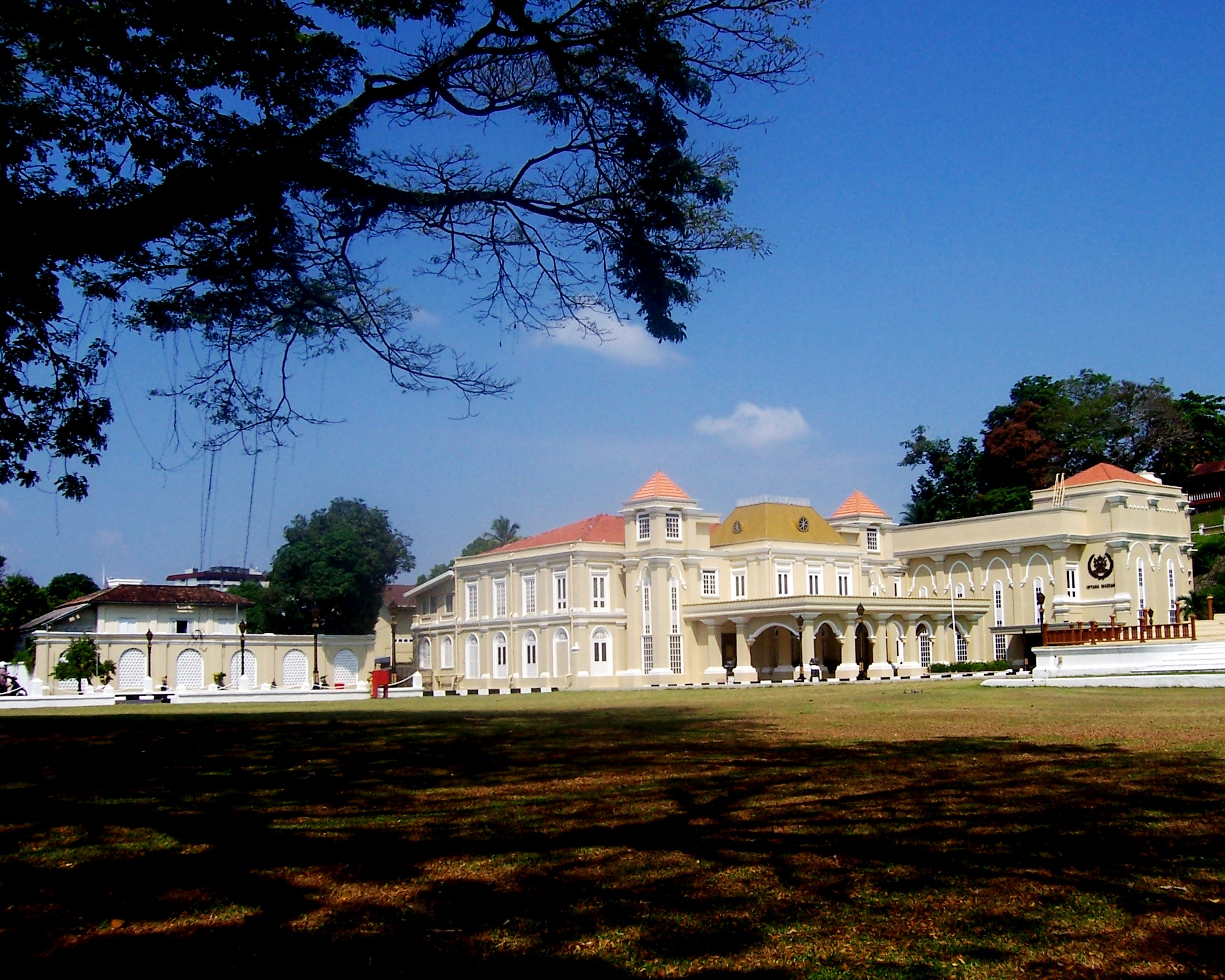
Maziah Palace

- Istana Badariah – Royal palace built in 1940 by Sultan Sulaiman Badrul Alam Shah. This palace also functioned as the Renca-Consol during Japanese occupation in Malaya.
- Istana Maziah – It is believed to have been constructed during the reign of Sultan Zainal Abidin Ill in Terengganu. It was built in 1897 to replace the Istana Hijau. This palace is located at Bukit Puteri
- Istana Nur Nadhirah – Palace for the Crown Prince of Terengganu Istana Nur Nadhirah This palace was built in 1920 after the signing of Terengganu-Inggeris Treaty. During the Japanese occupation in Malaya, this palace served as the official residence of Shuchiji Kakha (Shu Chokan Kakha ). After World War II until December 1956 this palace served as the official residence of British Governor.
- Istana Syarqiyyah – Royal palace in Chendering, Terengganu. This is the newest palace and official residence of Sultan of Terengganu and Sultanah of Terengganu.
- Istana Al-Muktafibillah Shah

=== Kelantan ===
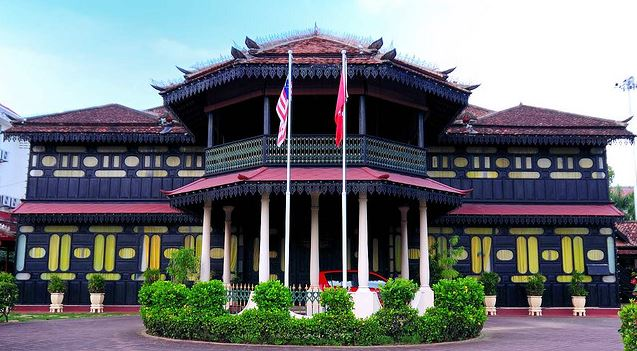
Front facade of Istana Jahar

- Istana Balai Besar – Built by Sultan Muhamad II in 1840 in Kota Bharu
- Istana Batu – The Royal Museum is located in the middle of the Kota Bharu, Kelantan. The design of the palace was inspired by Sultan Ismail Ibni Almarhum Sultan Muhammad IV who reigned from 1920 to 1944.
- Istana Bukit Tanah – Built by Sultan Ismail Ibni Almarhum Sultan Muhammad IV in 1920 in Tumpat, Kelantan
- Istana Jahar – Built in 1887, Istana Jahar was a gift from Sultan Mahmud II to his grandson, Long Kundur. Today, this palace is known as the Museum of Royal Traditions and Customs Kelantan.
- Istana Kota Lama – The royal palace of the Tengku Mahkota (crown prince) of Kelantan
- Istana Mahkota – Official residence of the previous ruler, Sultan Ismail Petra in Kubang Kerian, Kelantan
- Istana Negeri – The Sultan of Kelantan's official residence in Kubang Kerian, Kelantan
- Istana Telipot – Official residence of Tengku Muhammad Faris Petra, Crown Prince & Regent of Kelantan (then) in Kota Bharu, Kelantan

=== Sarawak ===
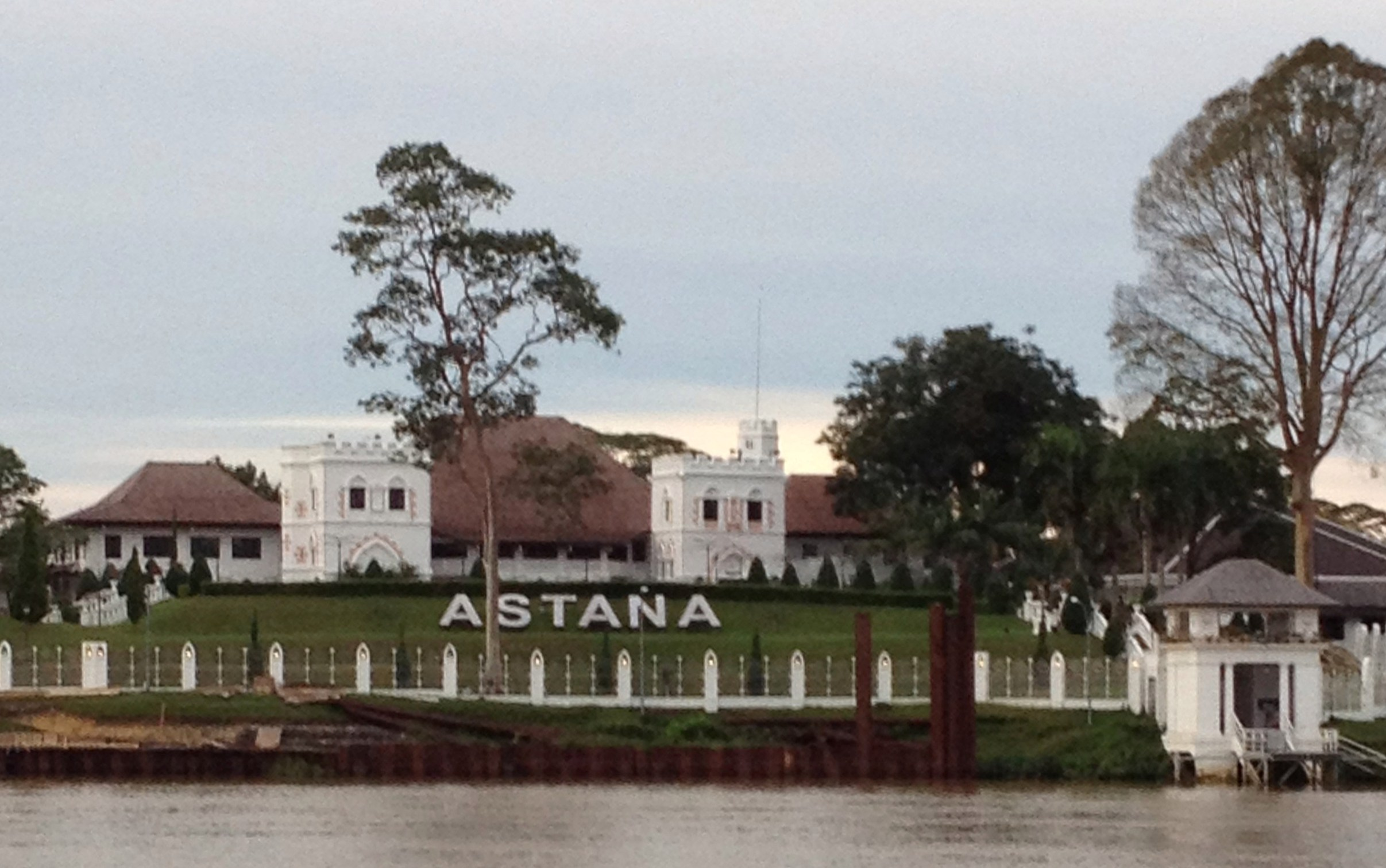
Front view of the building from Kuching Waterfront

- The Astana – Currently the official residence of the Yang di-Pertua Negeri, the Governor of Sarawak. The second Rajah, Charles Brooke, built this palace in 1870

=== Sabah ===
- Istana Seri Kinabalu – The official residence of the Yang di-Pertua Negeri, the Governor of Sabah.
