= Mestika Palace =

Palace in Petaling, Selangor, Malaysia

Coordinates: 3.083269°N 101.502611°E

- Istana Mestika
- Interactive map of the Mestika Palace area
- Alternative names: Istana Mastika

General information
- Location: Section 7, Shah Alam, Selangor, Malaysia, Shah Alam, Malaysia
- Owner: Crown Prince of Selangor

Mestika Palace (Malay: Istana Mestika; also known as Istana Mastika) is a royal palace of the crown prince of Selangor, which is located in Section 7, Shah Alam, Selangor, Malaysia.

== See also ==
- Istana Alam Shah
- Istana Bukit Kayangan
- Istana Darul Ehsan
