= Istana Bukit Kayangan =

Palace in Shah Alam, Selangor, Malaysia

- Interactive map of the Istana Bukit Kayangan area

General information
- Location: Shah Alam, Selangor, Malaysia
- Coordinates: 3.07193°N 101.534047°E

Istana Bukit Kayangan (English: Bukit Kayangan Palace) is the Sultan of Selangor's second official palace, located in Shah Alam, Selangor, Malaysia.

== See also ==
- Istana Alam Shah
- Istana Darul Ehsan
- Istana Mestika
