= Istana Bandar =

Historical palace in Jugra, Malaysia

Coordinates: 2°51′37.0″N 101°26′28.2″E

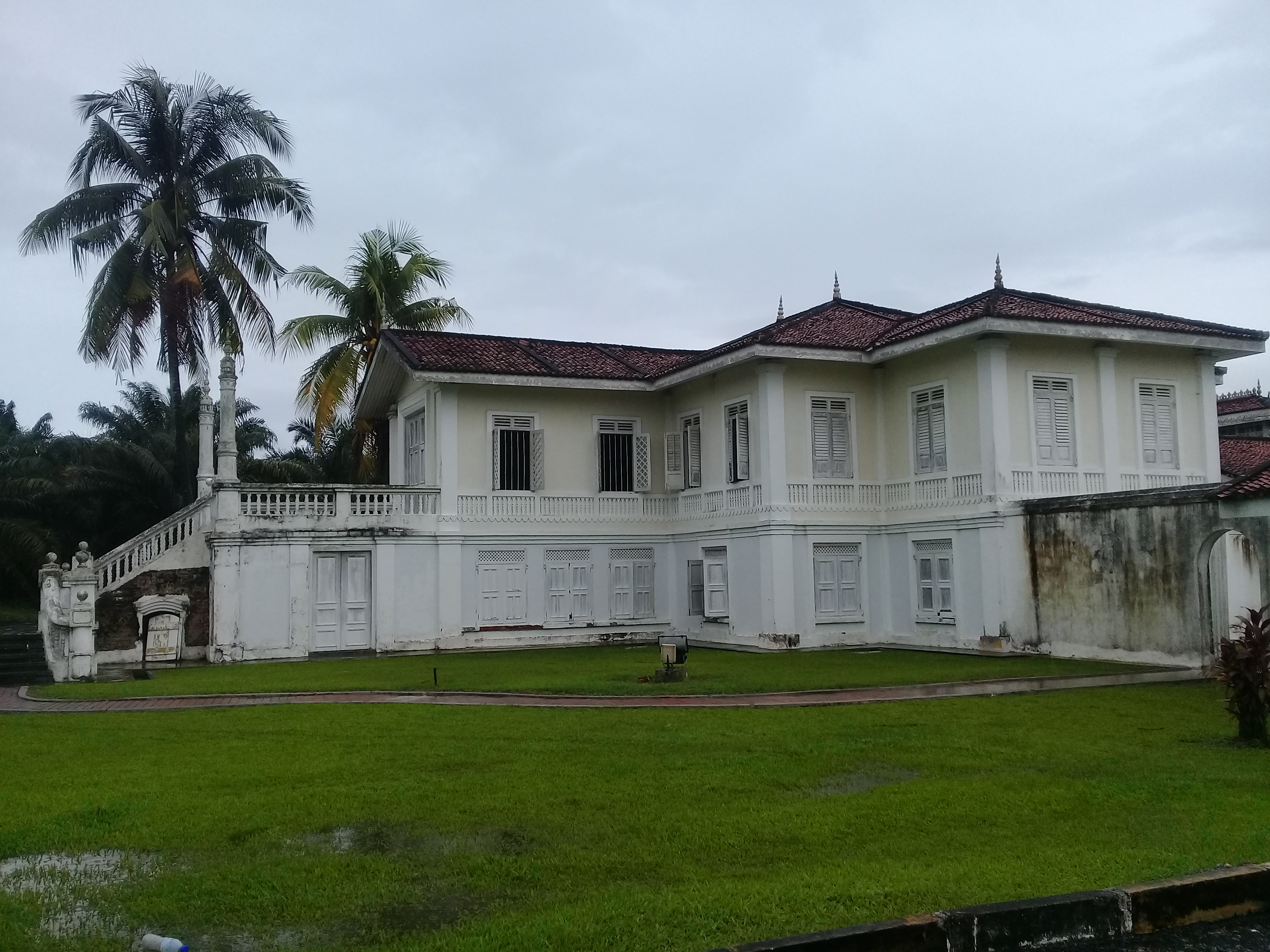
- Interactive map of the Istana Bandar area

General information
- Location: Jugra, Kuala Langat District, Selangor, Malaysia

The Istana Bandar is a historical palace in Jugra, Kuala Langat District, Selangor, Malaysia.

It is somewhat hidden. There is no entrance fee to enter the place.

== History ==
It was built in 1899. The then-Sultan of Selangor, Sultan Alaeddin Sulaiman Shah, whose official residence was in Klang, still frequented this palace for Friday prayers at the mosque next to this palace. It was mothballed after his death in 1938. This palace is also the place the 7th Sultan, Sultan Salahuddin Abdul Aziz Shah, was born.

Chinese workers (originally from nearby mining activities) were recruited for the construction project of this palace.

== Transportation ==
There is a Smart Selangor bus stop about 2 km south from the palace, served by Smart Selangor bus route BTG 2. The bus connects to Banting town. From there though, you will have to find it on foot.

From Banting town, route BTG 1 connects to Kuala Lumpur International Airport and Salak Tinggi ERL (Airport Express) station. Other routes, e.g. 730 connect to Klang.
