= Istana Negara, Jalan Tuanku Abdul Halim =

Official residence of the Yang di-Pertuan Agong of Malaysia

National Palace of Malaysia
- Istana Negara Malaysia ايستان نڬارا مليسيا
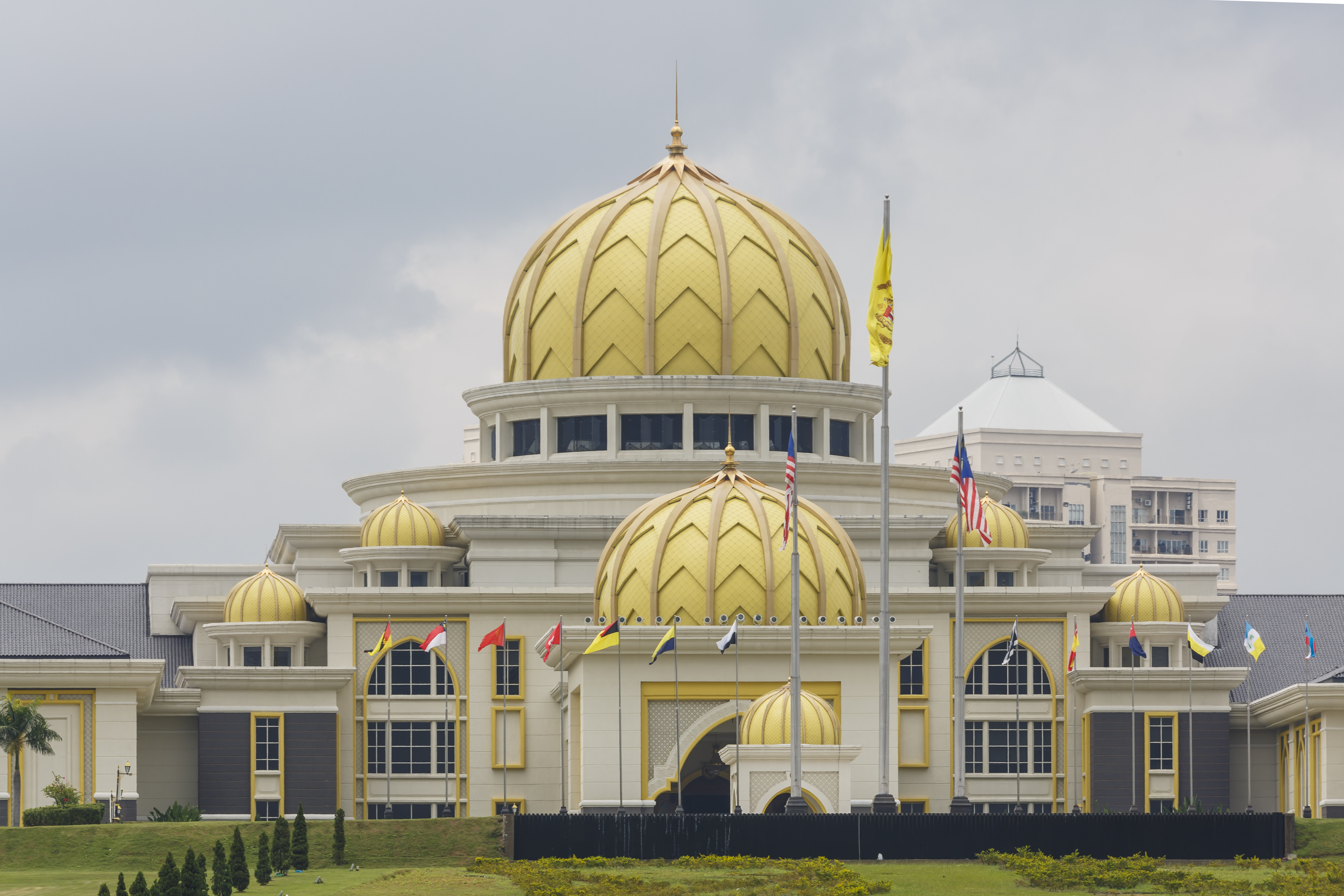
- Interactive map of the National Palace of Malaysia area

General information
- Type: Royal palace
- Architectural style: Malay, Islamic and Western architecture
- Location: Kuala Lumpur, Malaysia
- Current tenants: Ibrahim Iskandar, the Yang di-Pertuan Agong
- Groundbreaking: 1 November 2007
- Construction started: 5 November 2007
- Completed: 16 September 2011
- Inaugurated: 15 November 2011
- Cost: RM1 billion
- Owner: Government of Malaysia

Design and construction
- Architects: Malaysian Public Works Department; Kumpulan Seni Reka Sdn. Bhd.
- Main contractor: Malaysian Public Works Department; Maya Maju Sdn. Bhd.

Malaysian National Palace
- Istana Negara Malaysia

Agency overview
- Formed: 31 August 1957; 68 years ago
- Jurisdiction: Malaysia
- Headquarters: Kuala Lumpur, Malaysia
- Annual budget: RM70.00 billion (2023)
- Agency executives: Tan Sri Dato' Dr. Haji Azmi bin Rohani, Comptroller of the Royal Family and Household (Datuk Pengelola Bijaya Diraja); Datuk Azuan Effendy bin Zairakithnaini, Grand Chamberlain of the Royal Family and Household (Datuk Paduka Maharaja Lela)
- Parent department: Prime Minister's Department
- Website: www.istananegara.gov.my

The Istana Negara (English: National Palace; Jawi: ايستان نڬارا) is the official residence of the Yang di-Pertuan Agong (King of Malaysia). It is located along Jalan Tuanku Abdul Halim (formerly Jalan Duta) near Taman Duta, northwestern Kuala Lumpur. The palace opened in 2011 and replaced the old Istana Negara which was located at a different compound in central Kuala Lumpur.

The palace complex has an area of 97.65 hectares, 22 domes, and is split into three main portions: the Formal Component, Royal Component and Administration Component.

There are 3 entrances to the palace. The first is through the main gateway entrance via Jalan Tuanku Abdul Halim flyover for the Yang di-Pertuan Agong, Raja Permaisuri Agong, Sultan and Sultanah of the State, Yang di-Pertua Negeri, Diplomats and Government Head, Prime Minister and Deputy Prime Minister and wife. The second entrance is located at Jalan Semantan – Dungun serves as a main entrance for the Royal Guest and VIP. The third entrance at Jalan Sri Hartamas is meant for members of the general public that have an appointment with the Yang di-Pertuan Agong and Raja Permaisuri Agong and also the Palace Administration's Staff.

== History ==
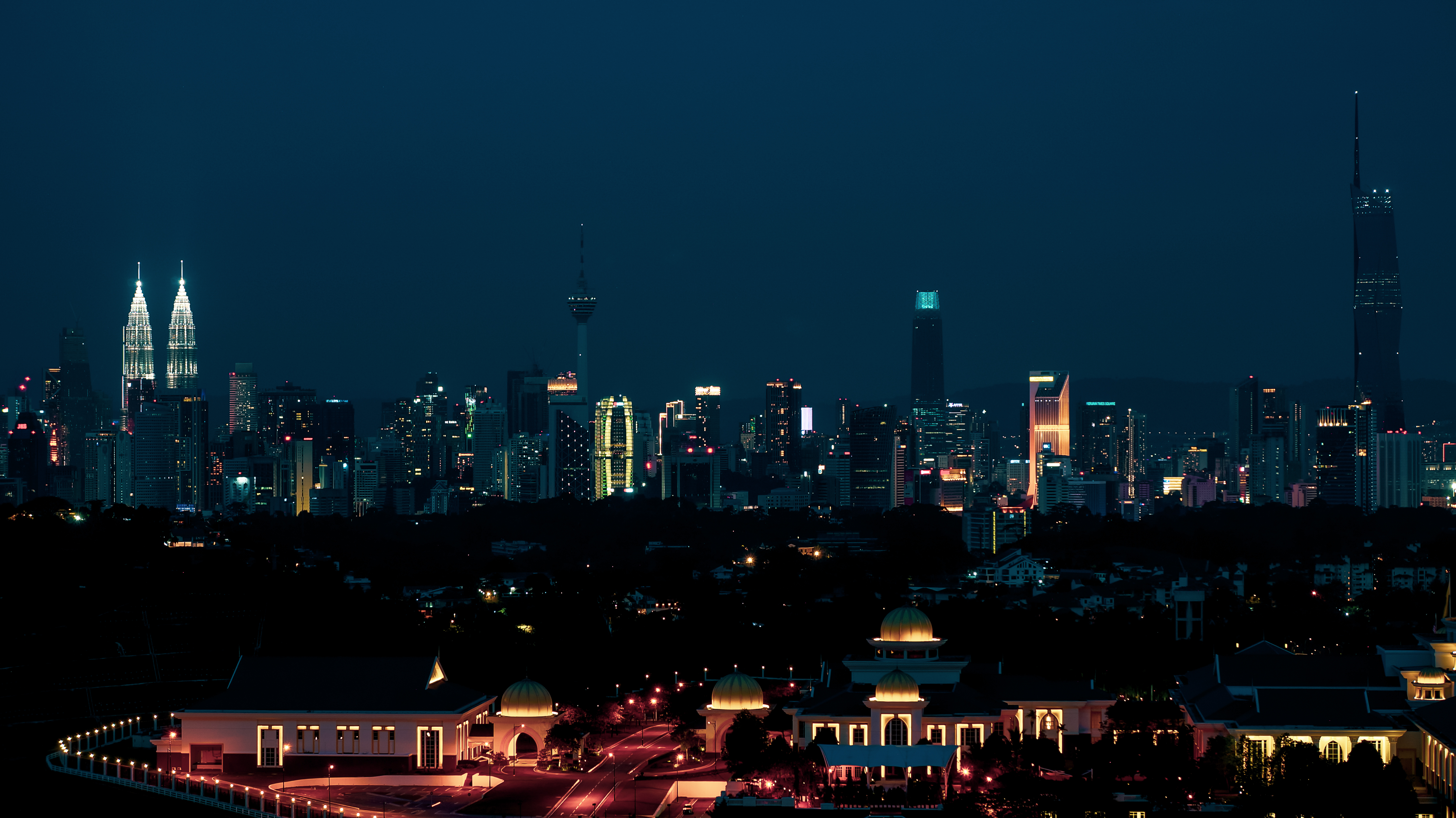
Istana Negara with Kuala Lumpur skyline in the background at dusk in 2024.

The site where the palace is located was gazetted for such purpose in 1976, and numerous contractors were involved in the initial planning. The need for a new palace, according to the Works Minister Samy Vellu, had been pressing due to space constraints in the old palace. The Balai Rong Seri (throne room) of the old palace was also used as the dining and meeting rooms. The site of the new palace is 96.52 hectares, larger than the old palace complex, and situated on a hill, of which according to Malaysian Public Works Department (JKR) director-general Dato' Sri Dr Amer Hamzah Mohd Yunus, only 28 hectares would be used for the development of the palace complex while the rest was allocated as a forest reserve and a buffer zone for safety purposes.

Construction began in November 2007 and cost RM812 million. The complex was headed by the 12th Yang di-Pertuan Agong, Sirajuddin of Perlis, serving the mandate trusted upon him by The Malay Rulers Council to overlook the affairs and activities of the palace's construction. Sirajuddin had also officiated the palace's new official site on 13 November 2006. The complex incorporates Islamic and Malay architectural elements, following designs by architect firm Kumpulan Seni Reka Sdn Bhd and was built by construction firm Maya Maju Sdn Bhd. The palace complex was slated for completion in 2009 but was only completed in September 2011.

The administration of the Istana Negara entered into full operation on 11 November 2011 during the reign of the 13th king of Malaysia, Mizan Zainal Abidin of Terengganu. The flag ceremony for the raising of the Royal Standard was held on 15 November 2011 to symbolise that the Istana Negara at Jalan Tuanku Abdul Halim had been officially declared as the new National Palace of Malaysia. The 14th Yang di-Pertuan Agong, Abdul Halim of Kedah was the first King to have his installation ceremony held there in 2012.

Among the unique features of the Istana Negara is its 22 domes. The two biggest domes are designed in the form of neatly layered beetle leaves. At night falls, the rays of the decorative lights that illuminate the domes produce an impact to its surrounding. The colour of the lights will change according to the functions held at the palace and can clearly be seen from afar.

== Palace areas ==
=== The formal component consists of the following ===
- Main Lobby
- Banquet Hall Pre-Function
- Banquet Hall
- Singgahsana (Main Throne)
- Singgahsana Kecil (Small Throne)
- Prayers Hall
- Dewan Seri Maharaja (Royal Waiting Hall 1)
- Dewan Seri Mahkota (Royal Waiting Hall 2)
- Dewan Seri Negara (VVIP Waiting Hall)
- Audience Hall
- Audience Chamber
- Bilik Mesyuarat Majlis Raja-Raja (The Conference Of Rulers Meeting Chamber)
- Kitchen Facility

=== The royal component consists of the following ===
- Royal Guest Suites 1–9
- Royal Bath (Royal Swimming Pool)
- Royal Kitchen
- Royal Dining Chamber
- Royal Private Garden
- Royal Wing's Lobby
- Royal Multipurpose Hall
- Foyer at the Royal Wing
- Office of the Seri Paduka Baginda Yang di-Pertuan Agong
- Office of the Seri Paduka Baginda Raja Permaisuri Agong
- Seri Paduka Baginda Yang di-Pertuan Agong & Seri Paduka Baginda Raja Permaisuri Agong Meeting Room
- Guest Lounge
- Guest Lounge on the First Floor of The Royal Wing
- Guest Lounge on the 2nd Floor of The Royal Wing
- Yang Di-Pertuan Agong's Personal Library
- Guest Library
- Mini Theatre
- TV Room
- Treatment Room
- Gymnasium, Sauna & Steam
- Dentistry Facility

=== The administration component consists of the following ===
- Offices of the palace administrators
- Praying chamber
- the Support Building
- the Security Office
- Multipurpose hall
- Emergency room
- Helipad
- Horse stable
- Swimming pool
- Sports recreation area
- Ceremonial cannons

== See also ==
- Istana Negara, Jalan Istana, is the former national palace of Malaysia's Yang di-Pertuan Agong in Kuala Lumpur.
- Istana Melawati, is the second palace of Malaysia's Yang di-Pertuan Agong situated in Putrajaya.
