= Istana Alam Shah =

Palace of Sultan of Selangor

Coordinates: 3°02′N 101°27′E

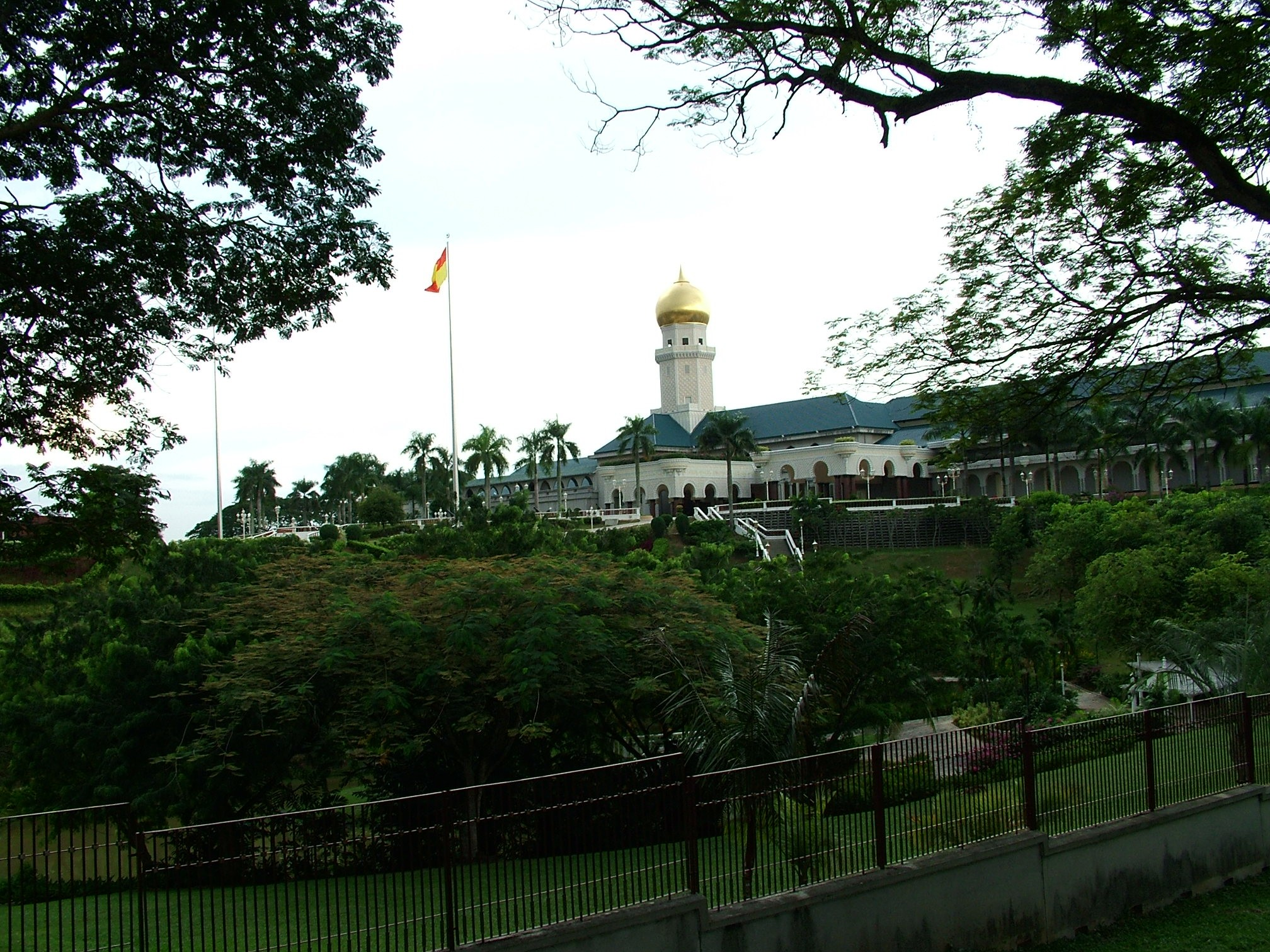
- Interactive map of the Istana Alam Shah area

General information
- Location: Klang, Selangor, Malaysia

The Istana Alam Shah is the official palace of the Sultan of Selangor, located in southern Klang, the royal town of the state of Selangor, Malaysia.

== History ==
Between 1903 and 1957 there existed an older palace on the same site, known as the Istana Mahkota Puri. It was built in 1903 during the rule of Sultan Sulaiman Shah, who was the fifth Sultan of Selangor, and the design closely resembles the Sultan Abdul Samad Building in Kuala Lumpur. The Sultan went on to live in the palace for 35 years until his death in 1938. In the 1950s it was briefly used as a student dorm for nearby schools. The palace was demolished in October 1957 and soon replaced by the present-day structure.

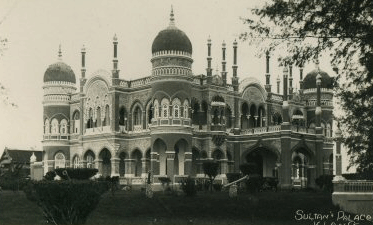
Istana Mahkota Puri during colonial rule

Despite the Sultan having two other official residences in Shah Alam and Putrajaya, most royal ceremonies (such as the coronation of a new Sultan) involving the Selangor royal family are held in the Istana Alam Shah.

The palace has 15 rooms and was built using wood and marble. In early 2000, extensive renovations were carried out by Sultan Salahuddin Shah.

== See also ==
- Istana Darul Ehsan
- Istana Bukit Kayangan
- Istana Mestika
