= King of Malaysia =

Head of state

- Yang di-Pertuan Agong يڠ دڤرتوان اݢوڠ
- Royal coat of arms

- Royal standard

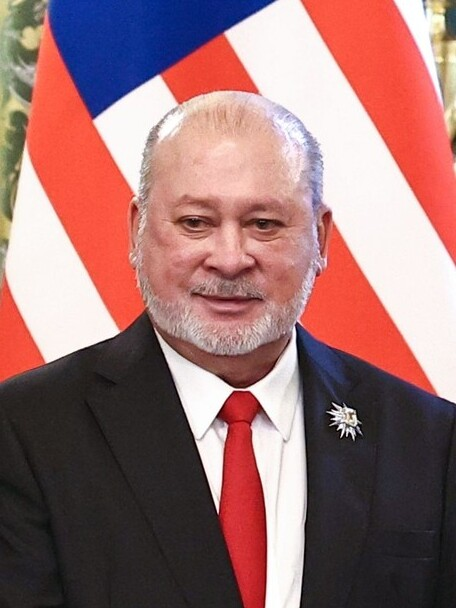
- Incumbent; Ibrahim Iskandar since 31 January 2024
- Style: Kebawah Duli Yang Maha Mulia Seri Paduka Baginda (Malay); His Majesty (English)
- Type: Constitutional elective federal monarchy
- Status: Head of state
- Abbreviation: YDPA
- Residence: Istana Negara (official); Istana Melawati (secondary)
- Appointer: Conference of Rulers
- Term length: Five years, renewable non-consecutively
- Constituting instrument: Constitution of Malaysia, Article 32
- Formation: 31 August 1957; 69 years ago
- First holder: Tuanku Abdul Rahman
- Deputy: Deputy Yang di-Pertuan Agong
- Salary: RM 1,054,560 (US$ 254,571) annually
- Website: istananegara.gov.my

The King of Malaysia, officially known as the Yang di-Pertuan Agong (lit. 'He who is made Lord', Jawi: يڠ دڤرتوان اݢوڠ), is the constitutional monarch and ceremonial head of state of Malaysia. The office was established in 1957, when the Federation of Malaya gained independence from the United Kingdom. The Yang di-Pertuan Agong is elected by the Conference of Rulers, comprising the nine rulers of the Malay states, with the office de facto rotated between them, making Malaysia one of the world's few elective monarchies.

The 17th and current Yang di-Pertuan Agong is Ibrahim Iskandar of Johor. He was elected on 26 October 2023, at a special meeting of the Conference of Rulers; he took the oath of office and was sworn in at the Istana Negara on 31 January 2024. The Yang di-Pertuan Agong's queen consort is known as the Raja Permaisuri Agong (Queen of Malaysia), currently Raja Zarith Sofiah. The royal couple are styled in English as "His Majesty" and "Her Majesty".

== Constitutional role ==
The Yang di-Pertuan Agong is referred to as a constitutional monarch. The Federal Constitution of Malaysia and Acts of Parliament made in accordance with it define the extent of his powers as the head of state. These are divided into two categories: powers exercised on the advice of the Cabinet or of a minister acting under the general authority of the Cabinet, the Conference of Rulers, or some other officer or institution, and discretionary powers.

The Constitution vests the executive power of the federal government in the king. However, with few exceptions, the king is bound to exercise this power on the advice of the Cabinet or of a minister acting under the Cabinet's general authority. In practice, most of the actual day-to-day work of governing is performed by the federal cabinet.

The discretionary powers of the king as stated by the Constitution and laws pertain chiefly to appointing the prime minister, withholding consent to dissolve Parliament, and calling meetings with the Conference of Rulers "concerned solely with the privileges, position, honours and dignities of Their Royal Highnesses". Under the Westminster system, the Yang di-Pertuan Agong is expected to appoint a prime minister who will command the confidence of a majority of the Dewan Rakyat, the elected lower house of Parliament. Should the prime minister be or become unacceptable, he may be forced out by a vote of no confidence, which would require the Yang di-Pertuan Agong to appoint someone else as prime minister or dissolve Parliament for an election. Conventionally, the prime minister is the head of the party with a majority in Parliament. This was the Barisan Nasional coalition from independence in 1957 until 2018, when the Pakatan Harapan coalition took office. The Yang di-Pertuan Agong renews the appointment of a prime minister after every general election until the minister decides to step down.

The Yang di-Pertuan Agong has discretionary powers to choose who he wants as the prime minister if no party has won a majority vote and is not bound by the decision of the outgoing prime minister (Article 40). It, however, does not afford him the right and authority to dismiss the prime minister. He also can dismiss or withhold consent to a request for the dissolution of parliament (Article 40). He may discontinue or dissolve parliament (Article 55) but he can only dissolve parliament at the request of the prime minister (Article 43). He can reject any new laws or amendments to existing laws but if he still withholds permission, it will automatically become law after 30 days from the initial submission to him (Article 66).

=== Appointments ===
The king appoints numerous high-ranking office holders in the federation under the terms of the Constitution and various legislative acts passed by Parliament. The constitution established procedures for such appointments.

==== The Cabinet of Ministers ====
- Prime Minister, to preside over the Cabinet, appointed at his discretion from among the elected members of the House of Representatives who in his judgment is likely to command the confidence of the majority of the members of that house – usually the party or coalition leader.
- Deputy Prime Minister, Ministers and Deputy Ministers, while acting on the advice of the Prime Minister.
- Chief Secretary to the Government as the Secretary of the Cabinet, while acting on the advice of the Prime Minister.

==== Commissions and committees ====
- The Election Commission, on the advice of the Conference of Rulers.
- The Judicial and Legal Service Commission, after consultation with the Chief Justice
- The Malaysian Public Service Commission at his discretion, after considering the advice of the Prime Minister and after consultation with the Conference of Rulers.

==== Judges ====
- The Chief Justice of Malaysia, on the advice of the Prime Minister and the Conference of Rulers.
- The Chief Judge of Malaya, on the advice of the Prime Minister and the Conference of Rulers.
- The Chief Judge of Sabah and Sarawak, on the advice of the Prime Minister and the Conference of Rulers.

==== Senators ====
The king appoints 44 at-large senators to the Dewan Negara, the upper house of Parliament.

==== State governors ====
The king appoints the Yang di-Pertua Negeri (Governors) of the states of Penang, Malacca, Sabah and Sarawak, at his discretion, after considering the advice of the state's Chief Minister/Premier, for four year terms. The governor's term of office can be renewed also at his discretion.

He also appoints the Mayor and City Council of Kuala Lumpur.

=== Head of Islam ===
In addition, the king is the Head of Islam in the four states ruled by appointed governors, in the three federal territories (Kuala Lumpur, Labuan and Putrajaya), as well as in his own home state. In this role, he is advised by the State Islamic Affairs Council in each of the States.

The king appoints the chairman and members of each state council. He also appoints the State Mufti (head) in each of these states. There is a single Islamic Affairs Council with jurisdiction for the three Federal Territories. Its members and chairman are appointed by the king, who also appoints the mufti of the Federal Territories.

=== Commander-in-Chief ===
In accordance with Article 41 of the Constitution, the king is Commander-in-Chief of the Malaysian Armed Forces. As such, he is the highest-ranking officer in the military chain of command, holding five star rank in its branches.

As the Supreme Commander of the Malaysian Armed Forces, he appoints the Chief of Defence Forces, on the advice of the Armed Forces Council. He also appoints the service heads of each of the three branches of the armed forces.

== History ==
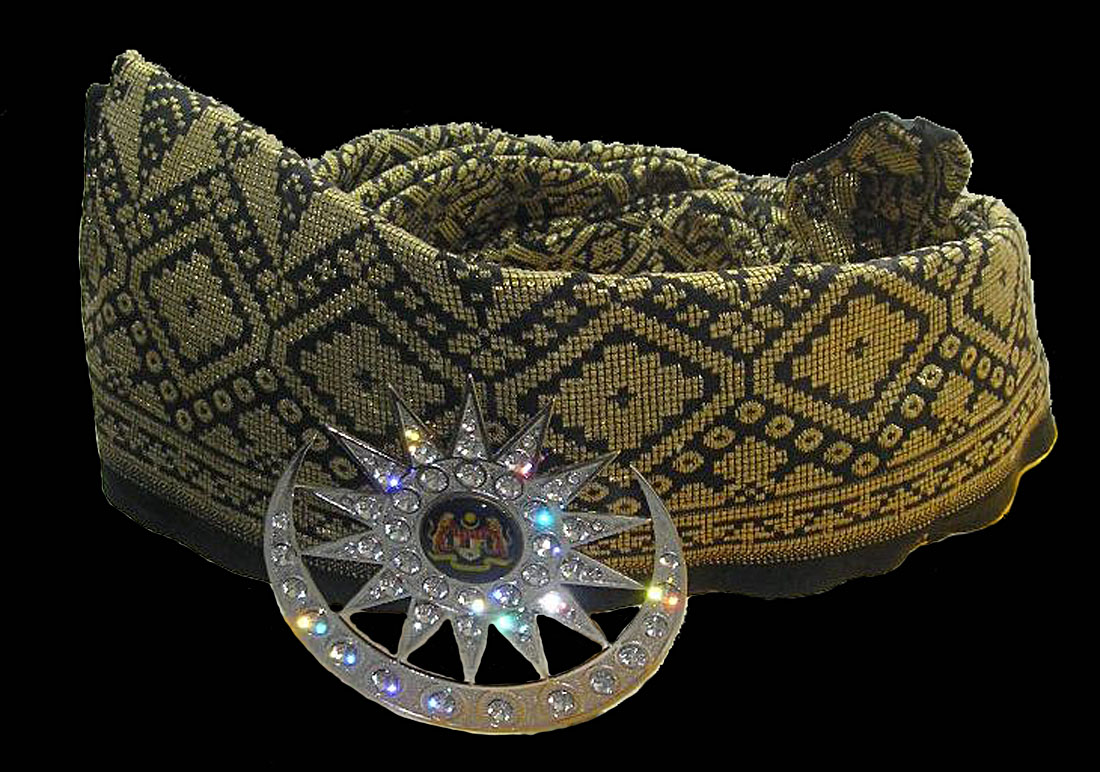
Replica of the King's Tengkolok Diraja (Royal Headress), a part of the Regalia of Malaysia.

On 31 August 1957, having rejected the suggested title of Yang di-Pertuan Besar in favour of Yang di-Pertuan Agong, the Conference of Rulers elected the first occupant of the federal throne. By seniority, the 84-year-old major general Sultan Ibrahim ibni Sultan Abu Bakar, Sultan of Johor since 1895, was first in line, but he declined the office due to old age. The next in line, Sultan Abu Bakar Ri'ayatuddin Al-Mu'azzam Shah, Sultan of Pahang since 1932, was rejected five times by his fellow electors and did not secure the necessary votes, in part because his various marriages to celebrities and cabaret dancers were seen as unbecoming of royalty – especially with the revelation (according to an oral interview with Tunku Abdul Rahman) of a surprise wedding to a ronggeng dancer and their honeymoon to Hong Kong. Tuanku Abdul Rahman of Negeri Sembilan, who had been elected to his state throne (Yamtuan Besar) in 1933, was elected king by eight votes to one.

The first Conference of Rulers after the formation of Malaysia comprised:

First Conference of Rulers
Title	State Rulers
Yang di-Pertuan Besar of Negeri Sembilan	Tuanku Abdul Rahman ibni Almarhum Tuanku Muhammad
Sultan of Selangor	Sultan Hisamuddin Alam Shah Al-Haj ibni Almarhum Sultan Alauddin Sulaiman Shah
Raja of Perlis	Tuanku Syed Putra ibni Almarhum Syed Hassan Jamalullail
Sultan of Terengganu	Sultan Ismail Nasiruddin Shah ibni Almarhum Sultan Zainal Abidin III
Sultan of Kedah	Sultan Badlishah ibni Almarhum Sultan Abdul Hamid Halim Shah
Sultan of Kelantan	Sultan Ibrahim ibni Almarhum Sultan Muhammad IV
Sultan of Pahang	Sultan Abu Bakar Riayatuddin Al-Muazzam Shah ibni Almarhum Sultan Abdullah Al-Mutassim Billah Shah
Crown Prince of Johor	Tunku Ismail ibni Sultan Ibrahim
Sultan of Perak	Sultan Yussuff Izzuddin Shah Ibni Almarhum Sultan Abdul Jalil Karamatullah Nasiruddin Mukhataram Shah Radziallah Hu'an-hu

== Election ==
The holder of the office and title of King of Malaysia is formally elected to a five-year term by and from the nine rulers of the Malay states (the nine states of Malaysia that have hereditary royal rulers), who form the Conference of Rulers. After a ruler has served his term as king, he may not stand for election until all rulers of the other states have also stood for election to the office and have served their term in the office.

In the event of a vacancy of the office (by death, abdication, or deposition by a majority vote of the rulers), the Conference of Rulers elects a new office holder as king as if the previous term had expired. The new king is elected for a full five-year term by the Conference. After his term expires, it holds a new election, in which the incumbent would not be re-elected to the office.

The position de facto rotates among the nine state rulers. The selection of the candidate for the kingship initially followed an order based on the seniority (calculated by length of reign) of each ruler in 1957, at the Federation of Malaya's independence from the United Kingdom. The Conference of Rulers, which has the power to disqualify a candidate, has sometimes varied the original seniority order, as noted above. Since then, the states have followed a de facto established rotation order. Minors are automatically disqualified from nomination and holding the office.

The Conference of Rulers has met regularly since 1985. The four governors (Yang di-Pertua Negeri; the heads of states without hereditary rulers) also attend the Conference, but only rulers are allowed to vote and stand for election for the office of king.

=== Qualifications ===
- Only a ruler may be elected as king.
- Only the state rulers may vote for the nominated ruler.

The Constitution provides that a ruler is not eligible for election as king if:

- The ruler is a minor.
- The ruler has notified the Keeper of the Rulers' Seal that he does not wish to be elected to the office.
- The Conference of Rulers, by a secret ballot, decide that the ruler is unsuitable by reason of infirmity of mind or body, or for any other cause, to exercise the functions of the office of king. The resolution requires at least five royal members of the Conference vote in favour of it.

=== Election proceedings ===
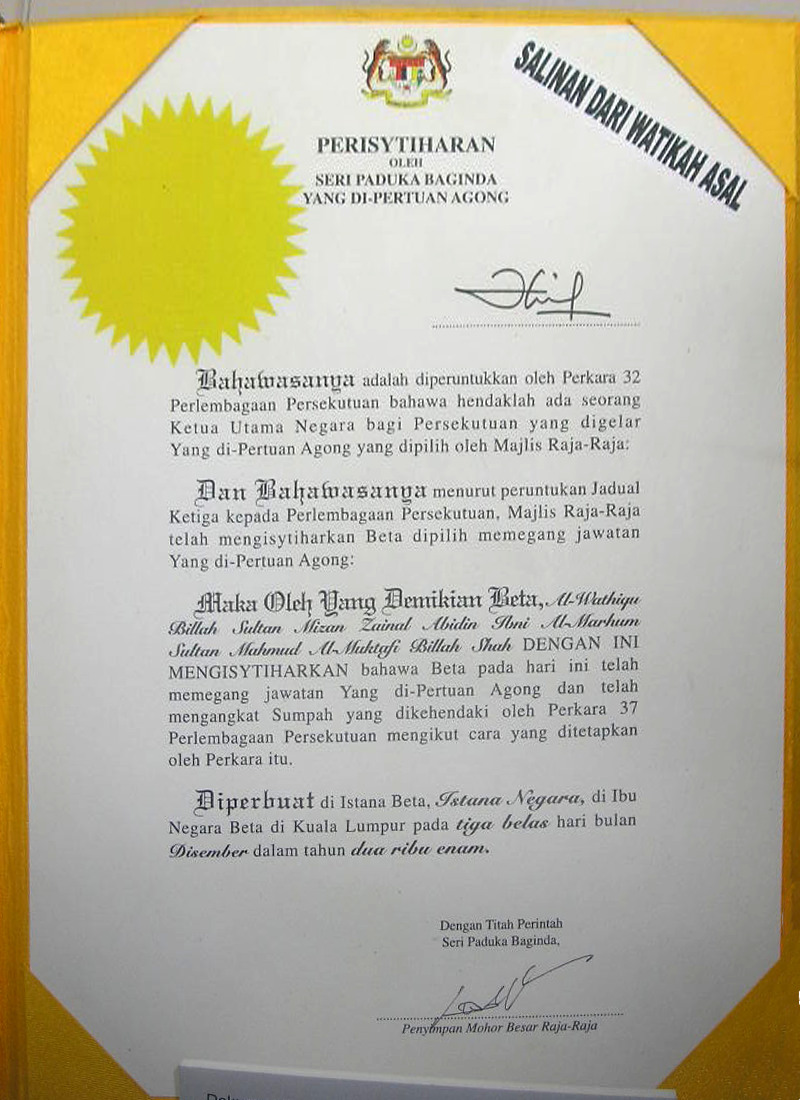
Letter of appointment of the 13th king of Malaysia, Mizan Zainal Abidin of Terengganu

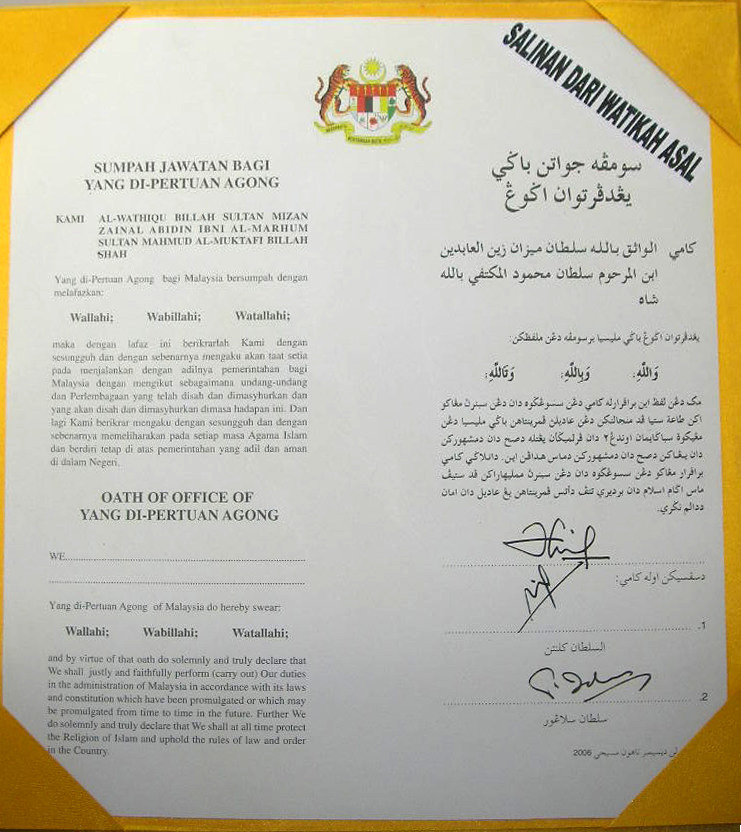
Oath of office of the 13th king of Malaysia, Mizan Zainal Abidin of Terengganu, in English and Malay.

The royal election is carried out by a secret ballot. The ballot papers used are not numbered, but marked with the same pen and ink, and are inserted into a ballot box. Only the royal rulers of the states participate in the election.

A ruler may appoint another ruler as his proxy to vote on his behalf if he is unable to attend the Election Meeting.

During the election process, the Keeper of the Rulers' Seal distributes the ballot with only one candidate. Each ruler is requested to indicate whether the candidate is suitable or not to be elected as king.

The most junior ruler, who is not listed as nominee for the office of king, or the outgoing king is appointed to count the ballot papers together with the Keeper of the Rulers' Seal.

The nominee must have obtained five votes before the ruler presiding over the Election Meeting informs him of his election to the office of king and asks him to accept the title. If the successful nominee declines the offer or the nominated ruler fails to secure the required majority votes for the office, the voting process is repeated with the nomination of the second most senior ruler based on the list of Seniority of States. Rulers are named and stand for election in turn.

The process is completed only after a ruler has accepted the offer of the office of King by the presiding ruler. The Conference declares the elected ruler to be the new king to hold office for a term of five years. The ballot papers are destroyed in the presence of the rulers as soon as the result of the election is announced.

On taking office as king months after election, he appoints a regent for the duration of his five-year term for the state which he rules. Usually, but not always, the prince regent is a close relative. The regent acts as head of state in that state for every purpose except for the role of head of Islam, which is retained by the king.

=== Order of seniority of states ===
Since the first cycle of nine kings (1957–1994), the order among the eligible state rulers has followed the order established by that cycle, namely:

1. Yang di-Pertuan Besar of Negeri Sembilan
2. Sultan of Selangor
3. Raja of Perlis
4. Sultan of Terengganu
5. Sultan of Kedah
6. Sultan of Kelantan
7. Sultan of Pahang
8. Sultan of Johor
9. Sultan of Perak

With Brunei's decision not to participate in the formation of Malaysia in 1963, only the rulers of the nine royal states of Peninsular Malaysia have been made eligible for election for the throne. Had it been admitted as a royal state the Sultan of Brunei would have been granted the right to stand for election as king by the Conference of Rulers.

This cycle was originally established based on seniority. However, the current rulers are named (and stand as a candidate) according to the cycle, irrespective of whether they are currently the most senior. Since independence from British colonial rule, this has been the order of elected kings. However, the order is not a precedent and the election to the position and office of the king is at the pleasure of the Conference of Rulers. As an elective monarchy, there is no line of succession to the throne of Malaysia.

Four of the states of Malaysia do not have hereditary rulers. These are Malacca, Penang, Sabah and Sarawak. Sarawak previously had three hereditary rulers (the White Rajahs) until it became a Crown colony of the British Empire in 1946. These four states, along with Malaysia's three Federal Territories (Kuala Lumpur, Labuan and Putrajaya), do not participate in the rotation.

== Immunity ==
In 1993, amendments to the Malaysian constitution removed the legal immunity of the king and the state rulers in their personal capacity, due to public outrage over their behaviour. A Special Court (Mahkamah Khas Raja-raja) is established where civil and criminal proceedings can be made against a ruler with the approval of the Attorney General. The right to sue a ruler is limited to Malaysian citizens following a precedent. The Special Court also have jurisdiction where a ruler initiates legal actions against any party.

When a ruler is charged with an offence in the Special Court, he is required to stop exercising the functions of a ruler. In the event of a ruler being sentenced to imprisonment for more than one day, he will be forced to abdicate from his duties as a ruler unless a free pardon is granted.

The king or any ruler cannot pardon himself or his immediate family. In such case, they may request clemency from the Conference of Rulers.

The king cannot be sued in court for his actions while carrying out his official duties. Any claims can be made against the federal government.

== Residences ==
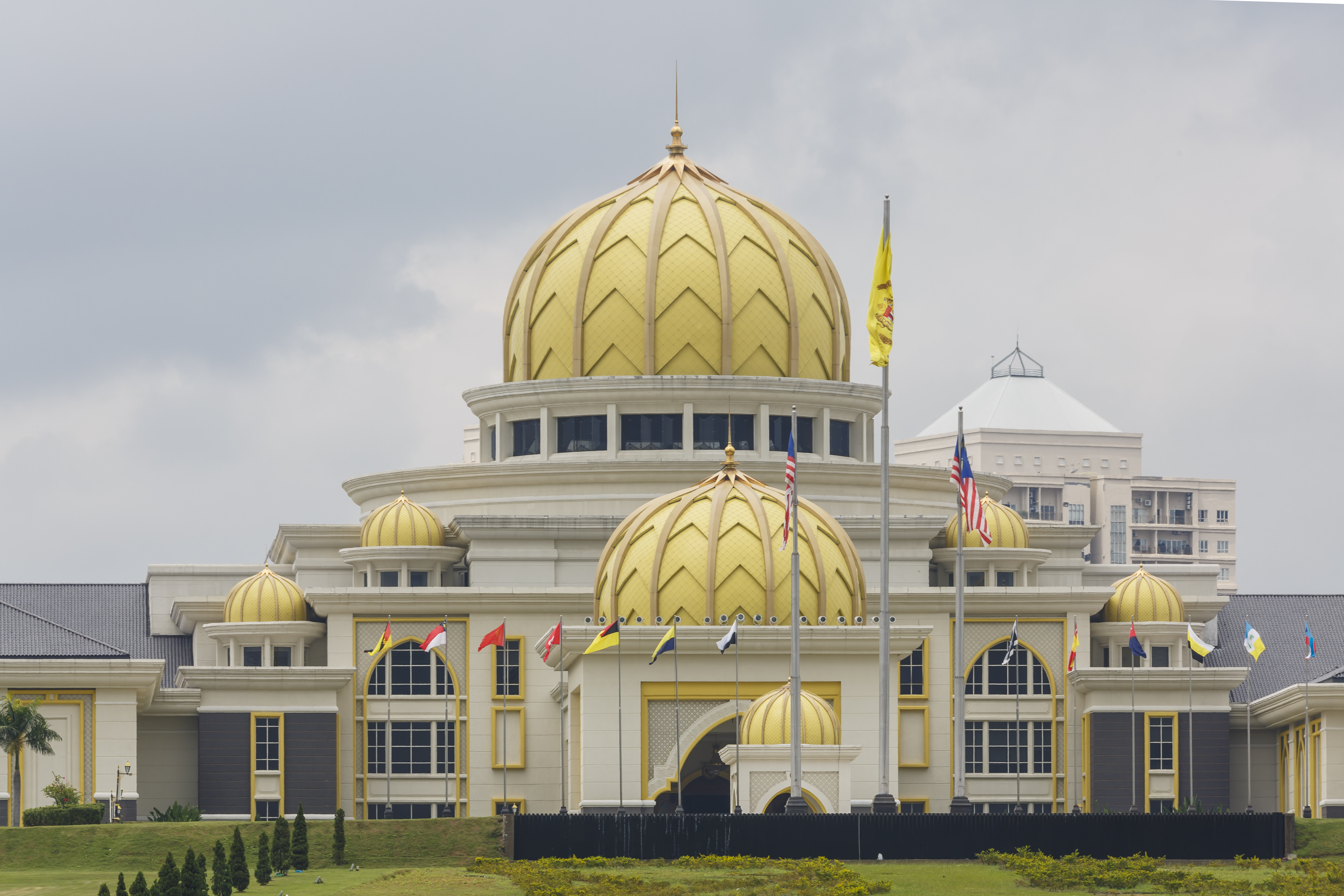
Istana Negara, the official residence of the King since 2011.

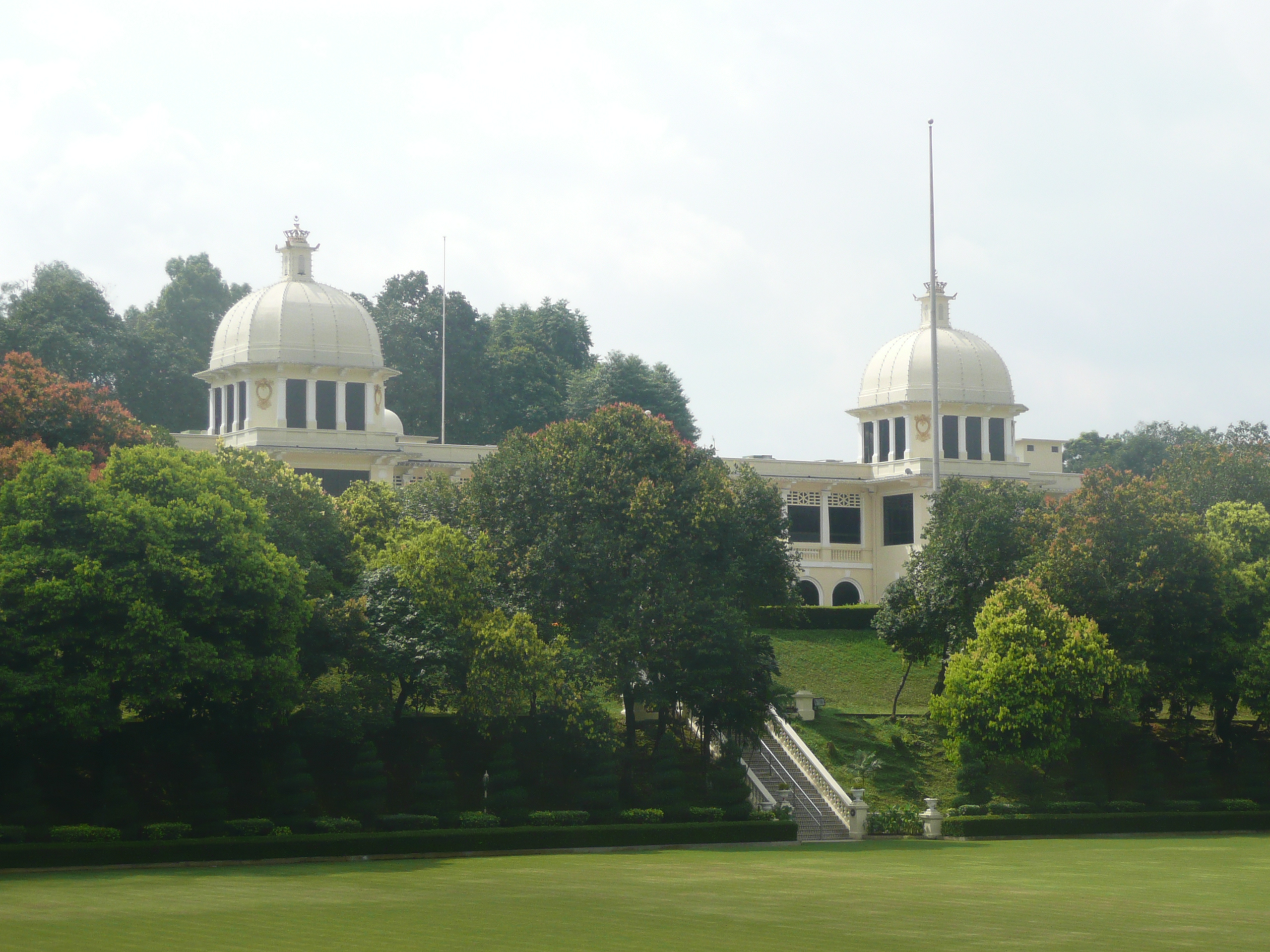
The compound of the old Istana Negara at Jalan Istana, official royal residence of the King from 1957 to 2011.

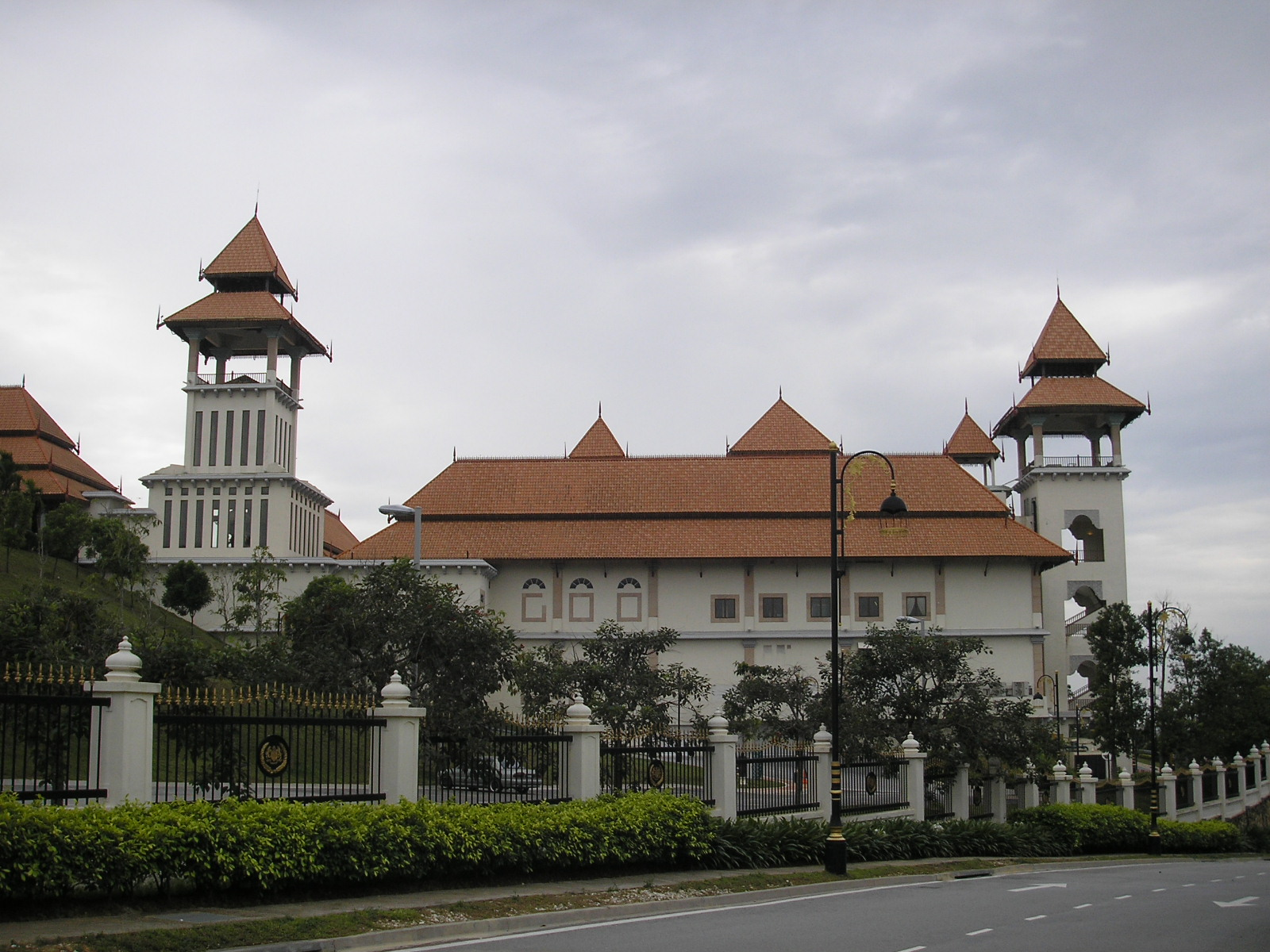
Istana Melawati, the second official residence of the King.

The official residence of the King is the Istana Negara (the National Palace) located in Jalan Tuanku Abdul Halim in the federal capital Kuala Lumpur. It was completed in 2011. It replaced the old Istana Negara in Jalan Istana which had been turned into the Royal Museum in 2013. Another residence is the royal retreat, Istana Melawati in the federal administrative capital Putrajaya. The two palaces alternate as a venue of meetings of the Conference of Rulers.

== Titles and style ==
Styles of The King of Malaysia
- Reference style: His Majesty
- Spoken style: Your Majesty
- Alternative style: Tuanku

The King's official full style and title in Malay is Kebawah Duli Yang Maha Mulia Seri Paduka Baginda Yang di-Pertuan Agong.

- Kebawah Duli Yang Maha Mulia literally means 'Under the dust of the Almighty', referring to how the regal power of the King is dust compared to the power of God and the ruler is always subservient to God.
- Seri Paduka Baginda refers to Seri as in a person. Paduka means footwear or shoes, and the term Baginda, is a third-person pronoun in Malay for royalty and prophets. These terms imply a lower status of the King compared to the prophets.
- Yang di-Pertuan Agong in literal English is 'He who is made Supreme Lord'. It is an archaic term for a presiding head which is Yang di-Pertuan or literally means 'One who is made lord'. "Agong" (or Agung in standard Malay) means 'supreme'. The term Agong is not translated, as in the Constitution of Malaysia.

Common English terms used in the media and by the general public include "Paramount Ruler" or "Supreme Head of the Federation". The very common term "King" has also been conveniently used by the media and official government portal, although it is not an official or legal title of the federal ruler according to the constitution.

In Malaysian passports before 2010, the title "The Supreme Head of Malaysia" was used in the English version of the passport note. Since the issuance of ICAO-compliant e-passports in 2010, the untranslated title "His Majesty the Yang di-Pertuan Agong of Malaysia" has been used.

In formal English correspondence, for many years the King was referred to as "His Majesty The Yang di-Pertuan Agong". In January 2024, this was changed to "His Majesty The King of Malaysia".

Formal address to the King is taken seriously in Malaysia. There are two ways of addressing the King:

- Malay: Tuanku (literally 'My Lord')
- English: Your Majesty

== Royal standards ==
The Royal Standard of the king is royal yellow with the Coat of arms of Malaysia in the centre, surrounded by a rice paddy wreath coloured gold – both are traditional royal colours in the peninsula. The same goes for the Royal Standards of the Queen and the deputy king, but the designs are different. The queen's standard is green in colour, with the coat of arms at the centre surrounded by the paddy wreath. The deputy king's standard is bicolored, yellow at the top and light blue at the bottom half, with the coat of arms at the centre (without the gold paddy) and below that is the office bearer's title in a gold scroll.

== Deputy King of Malaysia ==
Deputy King of Malaysia
- Timbalan Yang di-Pertuan Agong تيمبالن يڠ دڤرتوان اݢوڠ
- Royal standard

- Incumbent; Sultan Nazrin Muizzuddin Shah since 13 December 2016
- Style: Duli Yang Maha Mulia (Malay); His Royal Highness (English)
- Abbreviation: TYDPA
- Appointer: Conference of Rulers
- Term length: Five years, renewable consecutively
- Constituting instrument: Constitution of Malaysia, Article 33
- Formation: 31 August 1957; 69 years ago
- First holder: Sultan Hisamuddin
- Website: istananegara.gov.my

The Deputy King of Malaysia, officially Timbalan Yang di-Pertuan Agong (lit. 'Deputy Supreme Head of the Federation', Jawi: تيمبالن يڠ دڤرتوان اݢوڠ) is the deputy head of state of Malaysia, elected by the Conference of Rulers to serve a five-year term alongside the Yang di-Pertuan Agong (King). The office is usually (but not always) held by the ruler next in line to rule after the current king. The deputy king exercises the functions of the head of state during the king's absence or inability to exercise the functions of his office due to illness, resignation, or infirmity (similar to a regent or viceroy/vizier in other countries).

The deputy king does not automatically succeed as King of Malaysia when a vacancy occurs in that office. The deputy king acts as head of state in the interregnum period before the election of the new king and deputy king by the Conference of Rulers as stated by the Constitution and legislative acts of Parliament.

The current holder of the office of deputy king is Sultan Nazrin Shah since 13 December 2016, the first to hold it for three straight terms of office.

== Official birthday ==
The first Saturday of June, until 2015, was mandated by law as the official birthday of the king. It is marked with various activities all over the nation and the celebrations in Kuala Lumpur are the highlights of the national festivities, with the celebrations of it from 2013 onwards lasting a whole week between two weekends.

After the installation of Sultan Muhammad V as the Yang di-Pertuan Agong in 2017, the date for the official birthday was amended twice, first to the last Saturday of July, and then to 9 September. This amendment was originally planned to take effect under the reign of Sultan Muhammad V until 2021, before his announcement of abdication. In March 2020, it was announced that Yang di-Pertuan Agong's birthday would be changed from the customary first Saturday of June (6 June) to the following Monday (8 June). From 2021, subsequent iterations of the Yang di-Pertuan Agong's birthday throughout Al-Sultan Abdullah Ri'ayatuddin Al-Mustafa Billah Shah's reign will fall on the first Monday of June instead.

The King's Official Birthday is recognized by law as one of the official federal holidays of Malaysia. While it warrants government offices, including schools to be closed and banks and other offices would follow suit, most of it falls on Saturday which is the nation's common weekend day so no additional leave day will be given and premises would already be closed for the weekend. This was before the amendments made it a weekday holiday.

=== The Yang di-Pertuan Agong's Birthday Honours List Ceremony and Birthday High Tea ===
The Istana Negara in Kuala Lumpur serves as the venue for the annual Yang di-Pertuan Agong's Birthday Honours List and Address to the Nation ceremony attended by the Yang di-Pertuan Agong and the Raja Permaisuri Agong, members of the Federal Government and Parliament, the state diplomatic corps, honoured guests and the Honours List members for the year, in the order of precedence of state medals. The event honours the year's national achievers and heroes with the awarding of state orders, medals and decorations and their accompanying titles. The Yang di-Pertuan Agong addresses the whole nation via radio and television on this day from the Throne Room of the palace complex. It is followed later by the traditional holiday high tea gathering at the palace grounds in the afternoon.

==== Trooping the Colour ====
Trooping the Colour in Malaysia, although inherited from the British, has transformed into a grander and more Malaysian celebration on the first Saturday of June annually live on Kuala Lumpur's Merdeka Square, which is both open to invited guests and the general public. As the Supreme Commander of the Malaysian Armed Forces, the Yang di-Pertuan Agong takes the salute on this day together with the commanders of the three services of the Malaysian Armed Forces, the Joint Forces Command, Malaysia and the members of the Malaysian Armed Forces Council, of which he is the chairman, plus military personnel and veterans in attendance. He wears the No.1 dress uniform on that day, and as each of the 8 state monarchs are Colonel-in-Chief of selected Malaysian Army regiments as well as of the Royal Malaysian Air Force and the Sultan of Selangor serves as Commodore-in-Chief of the Royal Malaysian Navy, he wears that regiment's coloured sash as part of his ceremonial uniform (for the Army), or the RMAF blue or RMN white No. 1 dress uniform. The 2013 edition was held on the second Saturday of June for the first time, while the 2016 parade was held on the fourth Friday of July (22 July) for the first time in National Heroes Square, Putrajaya, the national seat of government. Since then the ceremony were held there and is not open to general public until today.

RTM broadcasts the ceremony live, starting at 8:50am.

== Yang di-Pertuan Agong Scholarship ==
The Yang di-Pertuan Agong Scholarship (Malay: Biasiswa Yang di-Pertuan Agong, BYDPA), also known as the King's Scholarship, is a prestigious scholarship in Malaysia offered by the Yang di-Pertuan Agong and implemented by the Malaysian Public Service Department (JPA) since 2000, following the decision of the Prime Minister on 3 November 2004 and the approval of the Conference of Rulers on 16 March 2005; it recognizes candidates with extraordinary abilities to pursue postgraduate studies (Masters and PhD), especially in the fields of Science and Technology, with the first selection held on 29 September 2006. The 10th Yang di-Pertuan Agong awarded, the Yang di-Pertuan Agong Scholarship for the first time, to ten outstanding students to pursue postgraduate studies at high-ranking world universities. The award of scholarships was held at the Istana Negara in conjunction with the Independence Day celebrations and the Conference of Rulers. Recipients introduced at a special ceremony involving Malaysian royalty and the Prime Minister; as of 17 July 2024, 212 Malaysian citizens have received the scholarship (107 PhD and 105 Master's), with applicants required to be Malaysian citizens under 35 years of age as of 1 January of the offering year, and eligible fields of study including Science, Technology, Economy, Law, and Islamic Finance, while eligible institutions include major public universities such as University of Malaya (UM), University of Science Malaysia (USM), National University of Malaysia (UKM), University of Putra Malaysia (UPM), and University of Technology Malaysia (UTM).

== Lists ==
=== Yang di-Pertuan Agong (King of Malaysia) ===
The following rulers have served as the Yang di-Pertuan Agong:

#	Image	Name	State	Reign	Time in Reign	Birth	Death
1		Tuanku Abdul Rahman	Negeri Sembilan	31 August 1957 – 1 April 1960	2 years, 215 days	24 August 1895	1 April 1960 (aged 64)
2		Sultan Hisamuddin Alam Shah	Selangor	14 April 1960 – 1 September 1960	141 days	13 May 1898	1 September 1960 (aged 62)
3		Tuanku Syed Putra	Perlis	21 September 1960 – 20 September 1965	5 years, 0 days	25 November 1920	16 April 2000 (aged 79)
4		Sultan Ismail Nasiruddin Shah	Terengganu	21 September 1965 – 20 September 1970	5 years, 0 days	24 January 1907	20 September 1979 (aged 72)
5		Sultan Abdul Halim Mu'adzam Shah^{1st term}	Kedah	21 September 1970 – 20 September 1975	5 years, 0 days	28 November 1927	11 September 2017 (aged 89)
6		Sultan Yahya Petra	Kelantan	21 September 1975 – 29 March 1979	3 years, 190 days	10 December 1917	29 March 1979 (aged 61)
7		Sultan Haji Ahmad Shah Al-Musta'in Billah	Pahang	26 April 1979 – 25 April 1984	5 years, 0 days	24 October 1930	22 May 2019 (aged 88)
8		Sultan Iskandar	Johor	26 April 1984 – 25 April 1989	5 years, 0 days	8 April 1932	22 January 2010 (aged 77)
9		Sultan Azlan Muhibbuddin Shah	Perak	26 April 1989 – 25 April 1994	5 years, 0 days	19 April 1928	28 May 2014 (aged 86)
10		Tuanku Ja'afar	Negeri Sembilan	26 April 1994 – 25 April 1999	5 years, 0 days	19 July 1922	27 December 2008 (aged 86)
11		Sultan Salahuddin Abdul Aziz Shah	Selangor	26 April 1999 – 21 November 2001	2 years, 210 days	8 March 1926	21 November 2001 (aged 75)
12		Tuanku Syed Sirajuddin	Perlis	13 December 2001 – 12 December 2006	5 years, 0 days	17 May 1943 (age 83)	
13		Sultan Mizan Zainal Abidin	Terengganu	13 December 2006 – 12 December 2011	5 years, 0 days	22 January 1962 (age 64)	
14		Sultan Abdul Halim Mu'adzam Shah^{2nd term}	Kedah	13 December 2011 – 12 December 2016	5 years, 0 days	28 November 1927	11 September 2017 (aged 89)
15		Sultan Muhammad V	Kelantan	13 December 2016 – 6 January 2019	2 years, 25 days	6 October 1969 (age 57)	
16		Al-Sultan Abdullah Ri'ayatuddin Al-Mustafa Billah Shah	Pahang	31 January 2019 – 30 January 2024	5 years, 0 days	30 July 1959 (age 67)	
17		Sultan Ibrahim	Johor	31 January 2024 – Incumbent	2 years, 296 days	22 November 1958 (age 68)	

=== Deputy Yang di-Pertuan Agong (Deputy King of Malaysia) ===
The following rulers have served as the Deputy Yang di-Pertuan Agong:

#	Image	Name	State	In office	Time in office	Birth	Death
1		Sultan Hisamuddin Alam Shah*	Selangor	31 August 1957 – 1 April 1960	2 years, 215 days	13 May 1898	1 September 1960 (aged 62)
2		Tuanku Syed Putra*	Perlis	14 April 1960 – 1 September 1960	141 days	25 November 1920	16 April 2000 (aged 79)
3		Sultan Ismail Nasiruddin Shah*	Terengganu	21 September 1960 – 20 September 1965	5 years, 0 days	24 January 1906	20 September 1979 (aged 73)
4		Sultan Abdul Halim Mu'adzam Shah*^{1st term}	Kedah	21 September 1965 – 20 September 1970	5 years, 0 days	28 November 1927	11 September 2017 (aged 89)
5		Sultan Yahya Petra*	Kelantan	21 September 1970 – 20 September 1975	5 years, 0 days	10 December 1917	29 March 1979 (aged 61)
6		Sultan Haji Ahmad Shah Al-Musta'in Billah*	Pahang	21 September 1975 – 29 March 1979	3 years, 190 days	24 October 1930	22 May 2019 (aged 88)
7		Tuanku Ja'afar*^{1st term}	Negeri Sembilan	26 April 1979 – 25 April 1984	5 years, 0 days	19 July 1922	27 December 2008 (aged 86)
8		Sultan Azlan Muhibbuddin Shah*	Perak	26 April 1984 – 25 April 1989	5 years, 0 days	19 April 1928	28 May 2014 (aged 86)
9		Tuanku Ja'afar*^{2nd term}	Negeri Sembilan	26 April 1989 – 25 April 1994	5 years, 0 days	19 July 1922	27 December 2008 (aged 86)
10		Sultan Salahuddin Abdul Aziz Shah*	Selangor	26 April 1994 – 25 April 1999	5 years, 0 days	8 March 1926	21 November 2001 (aged 75)
11		Sultan Mizan Zainal Abidin*	Terengganu	26 April 1999 – 12 December 2001	7 years, 231 days	22 January 1962 (age 64)	
12		Sultan Mizan Zainal Abidin*	Terengganu	13 December 2001 – 12 December 2006	7 years, 231 days	22 January 1962 (age 64)	
13		Sultan Abdul Halim Mu'adzam Shah*^{2nd term}	Kedah	13 December 2006 – 12 December 2011	5 years, 0 days	28 November 1927	11 September 2017 (aged 89)
14		Sultan Muhammad V*	Kelantan	13 December 2011 – 12 December 2016	5 years, 0 days	6 October 1969 (age 57)	
15		Sultan Nazrin Muizzuddin Shah	Perak	13 December 2016 – 30 January 2019	9 years, 345 days	27 November 1956 (age 69)	
16		Sultan Nazrin Muizzuddin Shah	Perak	31 January 2019 – 30 January 2024	9 years, 345 days	27 November 1956 (age 69)	
17		Sultan Nazrin Muizzuddin Shah	Perak	31 January 2024 – present	9 years, 345 days	27 November 1956 (age 69)	

* Denotes those who became the new Yang di-Pertuan Agong (King) immediately following the end of their tenure as Deputy Yang di-Pertuan Agong (Deputy King).

== Living former Yang di-Pertuan Agong ==
There are currently four living former Yang di-Pertuan Agong; The most recently deceased former Yang di-Pertuan Agong was Ahmad Shah of Pahang, who died on 22 May 2019.

Name	Portrait	State	Reign	Date of birth	Note
Tuanku Syed Sirajuddin		Perlis	13 December 2001 – 12 December 2006	17 May 1943 (age 83)	Raja of Perlis
Sultan Mizan Zainal Abidin		Terengganu	13 December 2006 – 12 December 2011	22 January 1962 (age 64)	Sultan of Terengganu
Sultan Muhammad V		Kelantan	13 December 2016 – 6 January 2019	6 October 1969 (age 57)	Sultan of Kelantan
Al-Sultan Abdullah Ri'ayatuddin Al-Mustafa Billah Shah		Pahang	31 January 2019 – 30 January 2024	30 July 1959 (age 67)	Sultan of Pahang

== See also ==
- List of current monarchs of sovereign states
- Malay titles
- Regalia of Malaysia
- Official state car § Malaysia
- President of the United Arab Emirates
