= Istana Melawati =

Second national palace of Malaysia's Yang di-Pertuan Agong

Coordinates: 2°56′43″N 101°42′03″E

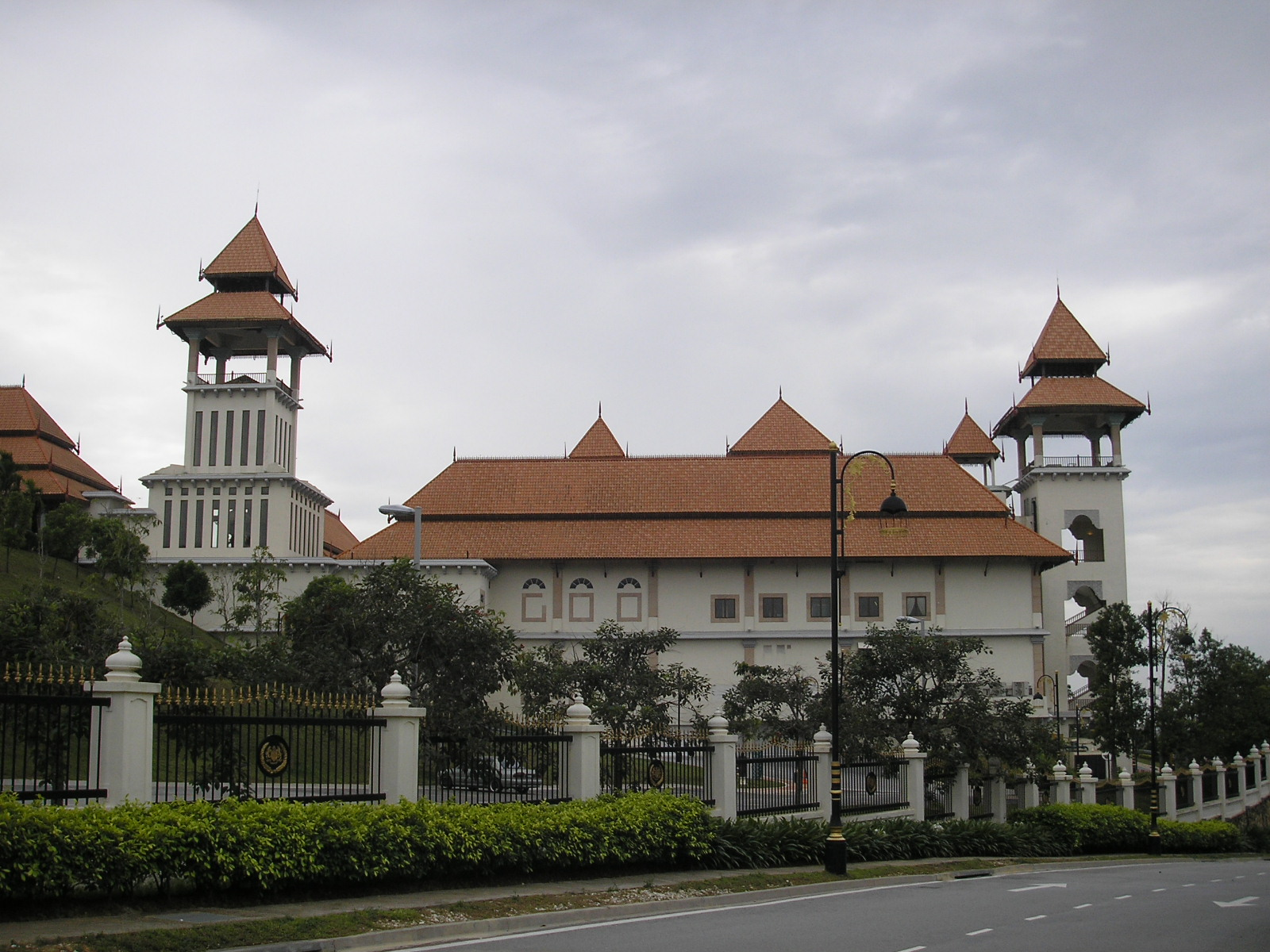
- Side view of the palace
- Interactive map of the Istana Melawati area

General information
- Status: Completed
- Type: Second official palace and royal retreat of the Yang di-Pertuan Agong (2002–present)
- Architectural style: Malay architecture
- Location: Putrajaya; Federal Territory, Malaysia
- Groundbreaking: 1999
- Construction started: 1999
- Completed: 2002
- Inaugurated: 2002

Design and construction
- Architects: Perbadanan Putrajaya; Seni Adnan Arkitek Sdn Bhd
- Main contractor: Perbadanan Putrajaya

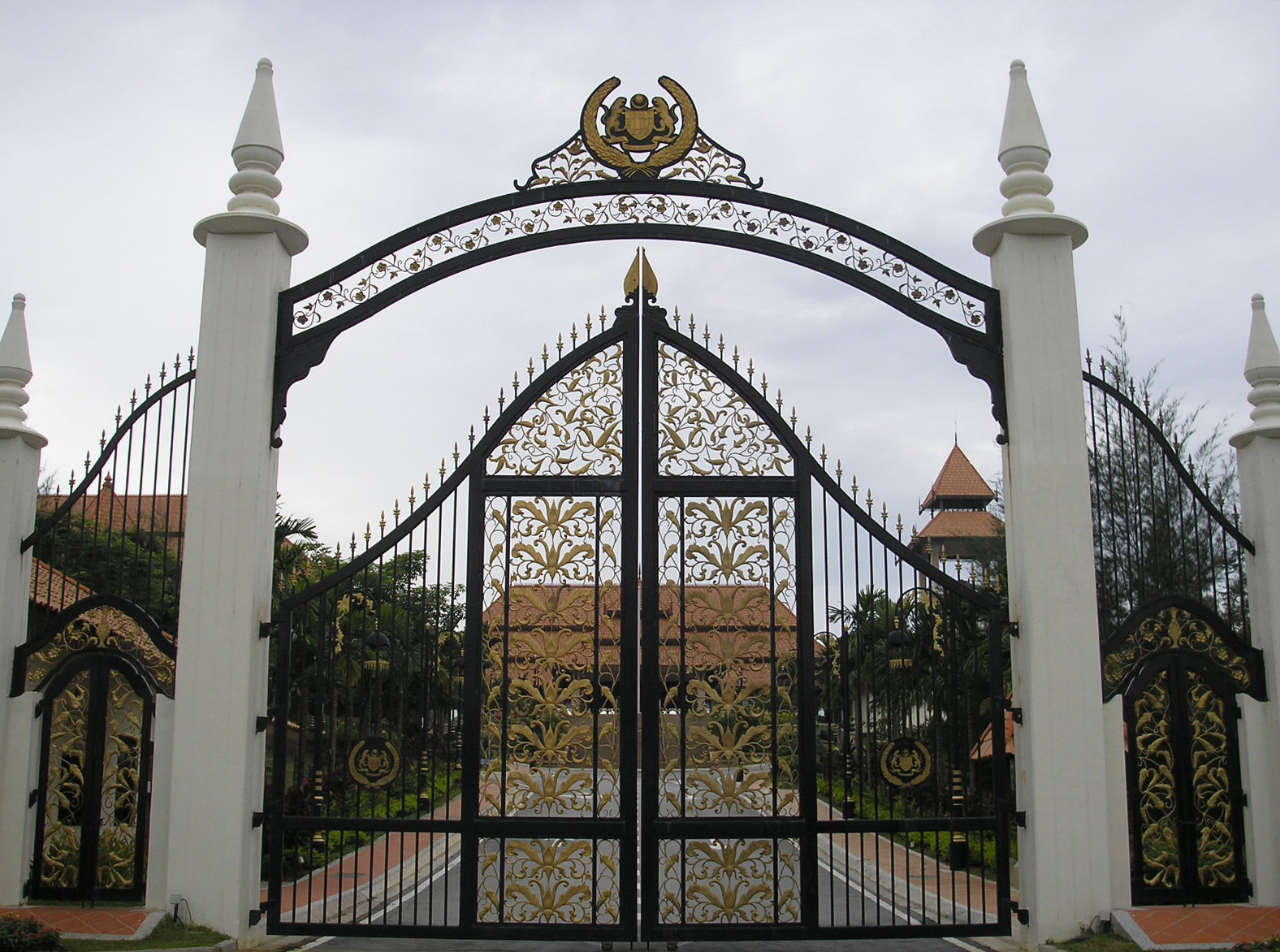
Main gate of Istana Melawati

Istana Melawati (English: Guard's Tower Palace) is the second national palace of Malaysia's Yang di-Pertuan Agong in Putrajaya after the Istana Negara in Kuala Lumpur. It serves as a royal retreat for the Yang di-Pertuan Agong.

== History ==
The Melawati Palace is located in Precinct 1, Putrajaya. Construction of the palace began in 1999 and was completed in 2002. It has a resort concept and serves as a retreat for the Yang di-Pertuan Agong. The name of the palace was given by the Yang di-Pertuan Agong Sultan Salahuddin Abdul Aziz Shah of Selangor. Melawati literally means guard's tower.

== Architecture ==
Designed by Tengku Adnan Tengku Mansor, principal of Seni Adnan Arkitek architectural practice, the palace comprises four main components namely:

- Royal Wing - Private quarters
- Reception Wing - Ceremonial Reception Hall
- Banquet Wing - Functions
- Administrative Block - Offices

Three tall towers form a prominent structure at the side and centre of the palace. These towers represent old guard towers to be found in medieval Malay palaces. The three tiered roofs with intricate eaves details and clay 'buah butong' (appendages at the corners) provides an authentic attempt to replicate Malay traditional roof designs of the east coast. Inside the palace at the main staircase of the Meeting Wing, is a Melawati which is made from chengal wood topped with golden roof.

== Interior ==
The Royal Wing consists of the following components:

- Royal Bedroom
- Royal Resting Room
- Royal Banquet Room
- Office of the Seri Paduka Baginda Yang di-Pertuan Agong
- Office of the Seri Paduka Baginda Raja Permaisuri Agong
- Royal Bath (Royal Swimming Pool)
- Royal Kitchen
- Royal Guest House
- Royal Gallery
- Main Meeting Room
- Balai Rong Seri (Throne Room)
