= Istana Darul Ehsan =

Palace in Putrajaya, Malaysia (e. 2000)

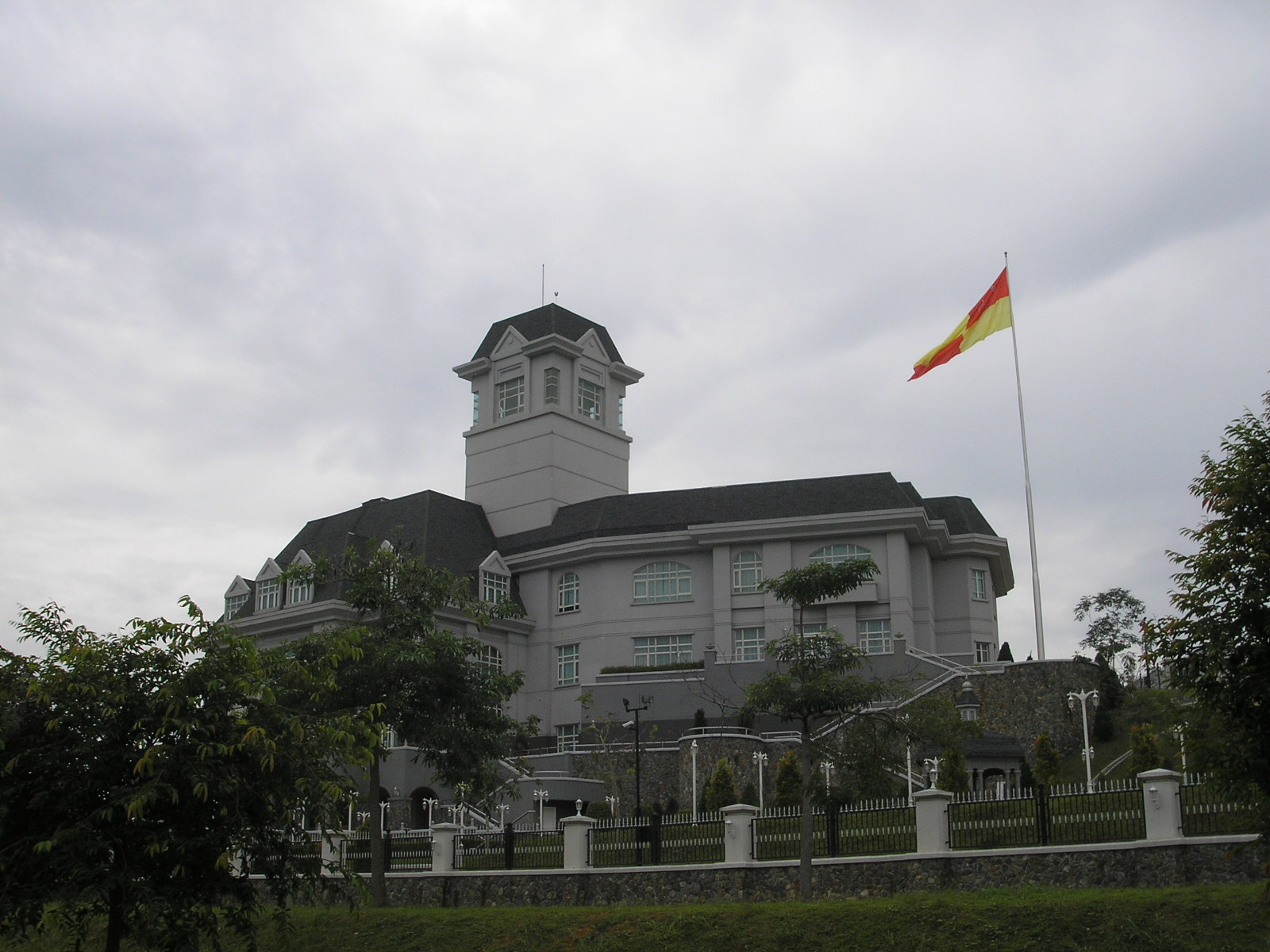
- Interactive map of the Istana Darul Ehsan area

General information
- Location: Putrajaya, Malaysia
- Coordinates: 2.9332014°N 101.6861984°E
- Year built: 2000

Istana Darul Ehsan (English: Abode of Sincerity Palace), located in Putrajaya, Malaysia, is one of the royal residences of the Sultan of Selangor (Sultan Sharafuddin Idris Shah).

Constructed on 20th Nov 2000, this huge grey mansion beside Putrajaya Lake symbolizes the appreciation from Malaysia's Federal Government to Selangor State for ceding Putrajaya to the federal government. It is constructed in Tudor style with high deep grey facade to be the Royal Retreat for the Sultan of Selangor and it is not open to the public. It often attracts attention from tourists.

It consists of 6 stories and lift services; the area included guarded private spaces, personal library and Grand Lobby (the floor covered by Malaysian marble).

== See also ==
- Istana Alam Shah
