= Klang–Banting Highway =

Road in Malaysia

Federal Route 5
- Klang–Banting Highway, Jalan Klang–Banting

Route information
- Maintained by Malaysian Public Works Department
- Length: 34.0 km (21.1 mi)
- History: Upgraded to dual carriageway on 31 October 2005

Major junctions
- North end: Klang
- FT 2 (Jalan Jambatan Kota) / FT 5 FT 2 Persiaran Raja Muda Musa; FT 3218 Federal Route 3218; Shah Alam Expressway; B10 State Route B10; South Klang Valley Expressway; B60 State Route B60; FT 31 Federal Route 31; B58 State Route B58; FT 5 Federal Route 5
- South end: Banting

Location
- Country: Malaysia
- Primary destinations: Bandar Bukit Tinggi, Pandamaran, Pulau Indah, Sijangkang, Telok Panglima Garang, Carey Island, Jenjarom, Telok Datok, Bandar Jugra

Highway system
- Highways in Malaysia; Expressways; Federal; State

Klang–Banting Highway, Federal Route 5, is a highway that connects Klang in the north with the town of Banting in the south. It is also known as Jalan Klang–Banting, Jalan Langat, Persiaran Tengku Ampuan Rahimah or Jalan Sultan Abdul Samad at Banting side. On TNB electricity poles, the code JBK and JKB is Jalan Banting Klang and Jalan Klang Banting.

== History ==
The Klang–Banting Road was single carriageway before 1999.

To overcome the future development at Banting and Klang, the federal government decided to upgrade Federal Route 5 sections at Selangor from two lanes to 4 lanes, start from Banting until to Sabak Bernam. Klang–Banting and Kapar–Sabak Bernam sections upgraded earlier, followed by the final section from Klang to Kapar. For Klang–Banting sections which also known as Jalan Langat FT5, the upgrade to 4 lanes dual carriageway project started from 1999 and completed in 2005.

At 3 pm of 20 July 2020, the boring of piles for the construction of the Shah Alam line (SAL/LRT3) project caused the Soil erosion and sedimentation in FT5 Klang–Banting Highway (Jalan Klang–Banting), near Pandamaran Road-Johan Setia Road intersections.

The Public Works Department (JKR) ordered to closed the Klang–Banting Highway from Banting to Klang closed emergency 72 hours for repairing.

== Features ==
- 34.0 km (21.1 mi) 4 lanes dual carriageway
- Banting Bridge

At most sections, the Klang–Banting Highway was built under the JKR R5 road standard, with a speed limit of 90 km/h (56 mph).

== Postcode ==
The following postcodes are used for Jalan Klang-Banting:

1. 41000 until 42400 Klang
2. 42500 Telok Panglima Garang
3. 42600, 42610 Jenjarom
4. 42700 Banting

== Junction and towns lists ==
The entire route is located in Selangor.

Legend:

- I/C - Interchange, I/S - Intersection, RSA - Rest and service area, OBR - Overhead bridge restaurant, R/R - Restaurant and rest plaza, L/B - Layby, V/P - Vista point, TN - tunnel, T/P - Toll plaza, BR - Bridge
- C - Cloverleaf, S - Stack, T-A - Trumpet-A, T-B - Trumpet-B, DT - Directional-T/Y, SDT - Semi-Directional-T/Y, P-Y - Partial-Y, D - Diamond, P-C - Partial cloverleaf, D-D - Diverging diamond, D-R - Direct ramp

District	Location	km	mi	Exit	Name	Destinations	Notes
Klang	Klang				Klang; Simpang Tujuh Roundabout	Jalan Raya Barat; FT 2 (Jalan Jambatan Kota) / FT 5 – Klang town centre, Shah Alam, Kuala Lumpur; Jalan Tengku Kelana – Jambatan Musauddin Bridge, Klang town centre Palace Ground (Jalan Istana) – Istana Alam Shah, Sultan Sulaiman Mosque; FT 2 Persiaran Raja Muda Musa – Port Klang, South Port, Northport	Roundabout interchange
Klang	Klang				Klang Chinese cemetery		
Klang	Klang				Klang Muslim cemetery		
Klang	Klang				Masjid Al-Rahimiah		
Klang	Klang				Tengku Ampuan Rahimah Hospital	Tengku Ampuan Rahimah Hospital	T-junctions
Klang	Klang				Taman Sri Andalas	Jalan Tun Abdul Razak – Taman Sri Andalas, Kampung Bukit Kemuning	T-junctions
Klang	Klang				Jalan Kim Chuan	FT 3218 Malaysia Federal Route 3218 – Port Klang, South Port, Northport	T-junctions
Klang	Bandar Bukit Tinggi				Taman Klang Jaya; Bandar Bukit Tinggi	Taman Klang Jaya, Bandar Bukit Tinggi 1, Lotus's Bukit Tinggi, Klang, Giant Bukit Tinggi, Klang	Diamond interchange
Klang	Bandar Bukit Tinggi				Bandar Bukit Tinggi; Bandar Botanic	Bandar Bukit Tinggi 2, ÆON Bukit Tinggi Shopping Centre, Bandar Botanic	Junctions
Klang	Pandamaran				Pandamaran-SAE	Shah Alam Expressway – Pulau Indah, West Port, South Port, Northport, Subang Jaya, Petaling Jaya, Sri Petaling, Kuala Lumpur, Cheras, Kuantan, Kuala Lumpur International Airport (KLIA), Johor Bahru	Diamond interchange
Klang	Pandamaran				Jalan Pandamaran-Johan Setia	FT 3218 Malaysia Federal Route 3218 – Pandamaran, Port Klang; B10 Selangor State Route B10 – Jalan Kebun	Junctions
Klang	Pandamaran				Bandar Parklands		T-junctions
Klang	Pandamaran			Road Transport Department (JPJ) Enforcement Stations			
Kuala Langat	Sijangkang			Sungai Air Itam bridge			
Kuala Langat	Sijangkang				Kampung Batu 9 Sijangkang Sempadan	Kampung Batu 9 Sijangkang Sempadan	T-junctions
Kuala Langat	Sijangkang				Kampung Batu 8 Sijangkang	Kampung Batu 8 Sijangkang	T-junctions
Kuala Langat	Sijangkang				Taman Perwira	Taman Perwira	T-junctions
Kuala Langat	Sijangkang				Kampung Batu 6 Sijangkang	Kampung Batu 6 Sijangkang	T-junctions
Kuala Langat	Sijangkang				Sijangkang	Jalan Masjid	T-junctions
Kuala Langat	Telok Panglima Garang				Telok Panglima Garang Industrial Area	Telok Panglima Garang Industrial Area, Telok Panglima Garang Free Trade Zone	Junctions
Kuala Langat	Telok Panglima Garang				Jalan Batu 10, Kebun Baru	Kampung Batu 10 Kebun Baru	T-junctions
Kuala Langat	Telok Panglima Garang				Telok Panglima Garang		
Kuala Langat	Telok Panglima Garang				Carey Island roundabout	Jalan Pulau Carey – Carey Island, Carey Island Orang Asli Village	Roundabout
Kuala Langat	Telok Panglima Garang				Telok Panglima Garang-SKVE	South Klang Valley Expressway – Port Klang, Pulau Indah, Putrajaya, Cyberjaya, Kajang	T-junctions
Kuala Langat	Jenjarom				Jenjarom	B126 Jalan Sungai Jarom – Kampung Sungai Jarom	Junctions
Kuala Langat	Jenjarom				Jalan Cheeding	B60 Jalan Cheeding – Kampung Seri Cheeding	T-junctions
Kuala Langat	Jenjarom				Kampung Sungai Sedu		
Kuala Langat	Telok Datok				Sungai Manggis	B69 Selangor State Route B69 – Kampung Sungai Manggis; FT 31 Malaysia Federal Route 31 – Dengkil, Putrajaya, Cyberjaya, Sepang, Kuala Lumpur International Airport (KLIA), Semenyih	T-junctions
Kuala Langat	Telok Datok				Telok Datok	FT 31 Malaysia Federal Route 31 – Dengkil, Putrajaya, Cyberjaya, Sepang, Kuala Lumpur International Airport (KLIA), Semenyih	T-junctions
Kuala Langat	Telok Datok				Telok Datok	Malaysian Public Works Department (JKR) Kuala Langat Headquarters, Kuala Langat District and Land Office, Stadium Jugra	
Kuala Langat	Banting			Langat River Bridge; Banting Bridge			
Kuala Langat	Banting				Banting; Persiaran Kota	Persiaran Kota	T-junctions
Kuala Langat	Banting				Banting	B58 Selangor State Route B58 – Jugra, Permatang Pasir, Masjid Alaeddin, Sultan Abdul Samad Mausoleum; FT 5 Malaysia Federal Route 5 – Morib, Sepang, Port Dickson	T-junctions
1.000 mi = 1.609 km; 1.000 km = 0.621 mi: Incomplete access
