= Kampung Kebun Baru =

- Village (Kampung)
- Kampung Kebun Baharu
- Motto: "Bersekutu Bertambah Mutu (Unity is Strength)"
- Country: Malaysia
- State: Selangor
- District: Kuala Langat
- Mukim: Telok Panglima Garang
- Village: Kampung Kebun Baru
- Time zone: GMT
  - Summer (DST): GMT
- Postcode: 42500
- Area code: +603

Kampung Kebun Baharu is a village located in Telok Panglima Garang which is also under Mukim Telok Panglima Garang, Kuala Langat District, Selangor. Kampung Kebun Baru has a village which is divided into 2, namely Kampung Batu 9, Kebun Baru and Kampung Batu 10, Kebun Baru.

Initially, this village only had 1, which was Batu 10 before Batu 9 was created. Kampung Kebun Baru is within the Kuala Langat Parliamentary Constituency and the Sijangkang (DUN) State Legislative Assembly (formerly Panglima Garang (DUN) State Legislative Assembly).

== Basic facilities ==
=== Education ===
1. Sekolah Kebangsaan Kebun Baharu
2. Sekolah Rendah Agama Kebun Baharu

=== Place of worship ===
1. Masjid Al Amin
2. Masjid Nurul Iman
3. Surau Al Jaafar (Temporary Friday Prayer Hall)
4. Surau Al Taqaruf (Temporary Friday Prayer Hall)
5. Surau Al Akhyar
6. Surau Al Yahya
7. Musolah Ukhwah

== Postcode ==
The postal code used in Kampung Kebun Baharu, Telok Panglima Garang, Selangor is 42500.

== External link ==
- Lokasi Kampung Kebun Baharu di Peta Google
