= Selangor State Route B60 =

Road in Malaysia

Selangor Route 60
- Jalan Cheeding
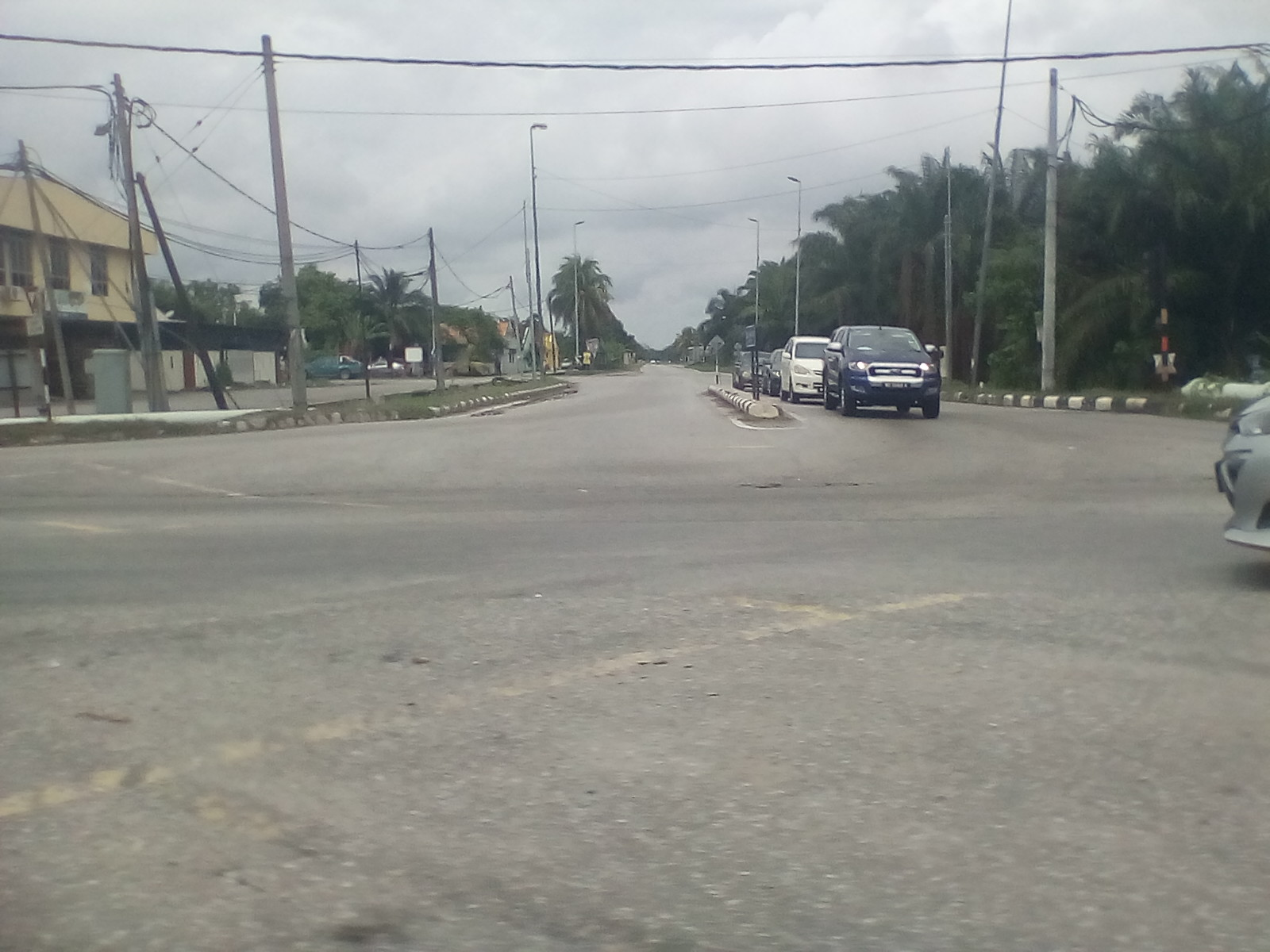

Major junctions
- West end: Jenjarom
- FT 5 Klang–Banting Highway
- East end: Kampung Seri Cheeding

Location
- Country: Malaysia

Highway system
- Highways in Malaysia; Expressways; Federal; State

Selangor State Route B60 (Jalan Cheeding) is a major road in Selangor, Malaysia.

== Junction list ==
The entire route is located in Kuala Langat District, Selangor.

Legend:

- I/C - Interchange, I/S - Intersection, RSA - Rest and service area, OBR - Overhead bridge restaurant, R/R - Restaurant and rest plaza, L/B - Layby, V/P - Vista point, TN - tunnel, T/P - Toll plaza, BR - Bridge
- C - Cloverleaf, S - Stack, T-A - Trumpet-A, T-B - Trumpet-B, DT - Directional-T/Y, SDT - Semi-Directional-T/Y, P-Y - Partial-Y, D - Diamond, P-C - Partial cloverleaf, D-D - Diverging diamond, D-R - Direct ramp

Location	km	mi	Destinations	Notes
Jenjarom			FT 5 Klang–Banting Highway – Telok Panglima Garang, Klang, Shah Alam, Kuala Lumpur, Banting, Sepang, Port Dickson, Dengkil, Kuala Lumpur International Airport (KLIA)	T-junctions
Jenjarom			B126 Jalan Sungai Jarom – Jenjarom	T-junctions
Kampung Sungai Cheeding			Jalan Seri Cheeding – Rimbayu	T-junctions
1.000 mi = 1.609 km; 1.000 km = 0.621 mi
