= Banting Bridge =

Sungai Langat Bridge Jambatan Banting
- Coordinates: 2.8154°N 101.5123°E
- Carries: Motor vehicles, Pedestrians
- Crosses: Langat River
- Locale: Federal Route 5 Klang-Banting Highway, Banting
- Official name: Banting Bridge
- Maintained by: Malaysian Public Works Department (JKR) Kuala Langat

Characteristics
- Design: Arch Bridge
- Total length: 120 meters
- Width: 20 metres
- Longest span: --

History
- Designer: Malaysian Public Works Department (JKR)
- Constructed by: Malaysian Public Works Department (JKR)
- Opened: 2007

Banting Bridge is a major landmark in Banting, Selangor, Malaysia. The bridge connects Banting in the west to Telok Datok in the east. The bridge is part of Jalan Sultan Abdul Samad Road, located on Malaysia Federal Route 5.

The main bridge is paved well, with skinny paths on both sides for pedestrians and bikers. From the top, it has a good view overlooking the towns of Banting and Telok Datok.
