= Banting (disambiguation) =

Banting may refer to:

== People ==
=== Surname ===
- Frederick Banting (1891–1941), Canadian medical scientist, co-discoverer of insulin
  - Banting House, a museum in London, Ontario, Canada
  - Banting Research Foundation, a Canadian charity
  - Banting Medal, an award given by the American Diabetes Association
  - Banting Lectures, a lecture series hosted by the American Diabetes Association
  - Banting Memorial High School, Alliston, Ontario, Canada
  - Sir Frederick Banting Secondary School, London, Ontario, Canada
- Henrietta Banting (1912–1976), Canadian physician and wife of Frederick Banting
- John Banting (1902–1972), English artist and writer
- Megan Banting (born 1996), Australian cricketer
- Mervyn Banting (1937–2022), Anglican priest
- Rodney Banting (1941–1996), British racecar driver
- Sarah Banting (born 1993), Australian rower
- William Banting (1796–1878), English undertaker and dietitian
  - Banting, a British, informal, archaic term for dieting, especially a low-carbohydrate dieting method (avoiding sugar, saccharine matter, starch, beer), derived from the name of William Banting, who popularised the diet. Wiktionary has a definition: wiktionary:banting

== Places ==
- Banting, a town in Malaysia
- Banting (state constituency), a state constituency in Malaysia
- Banting Bridge, a bridge in Malaysia
- SMS Banting, a boarding school in Malaysia

== Other uses ==
- Banting (boat), a traditional boat of Aceh
- Banting (crater), a lunar crater named after Frederick Banting
- Banting University, a fictional Canadian university in Degrassi: The Next Generation
