= Langat River =

River in Selangor, Malaysia

Coordinates: 2°48′00″N 101°24′00″E

- Native name: Sungai Langat (Malay)

Location
- Country: Selangor and Putrajaya, Malaysia

Physical characteristics
- Source
  - location: Mount Nuang
- Mouth
  - location: Carey Island
- Length: 78 km (48 mi)

Basin features
- Tributaries
  - left: Semenyih River, Labu River

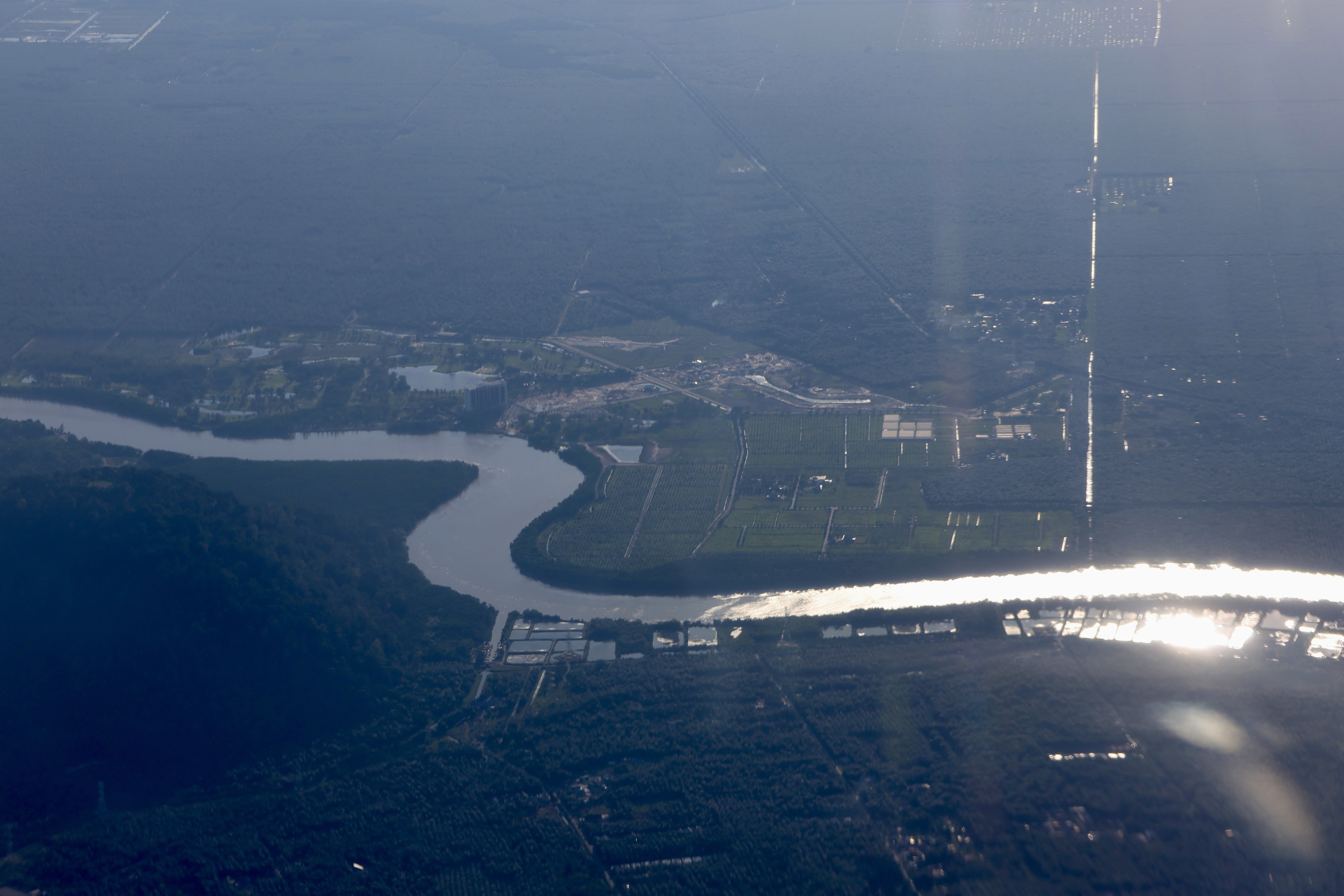
Aerial view of Langat River bordering Carey Island in 2023.

The Langat River is a river in Selangor state of Malaysia. The Langat is 78 km long, with a catchment of 2350 km^{2}, and originates from the Titiwangsa Range at Gunung Nuang. It drains westward to the Straits of Malacca. The major tributaries of the Langat River are the Sungai Semenyih and Sungai Labu.

== Towns along the Langat River basin ==
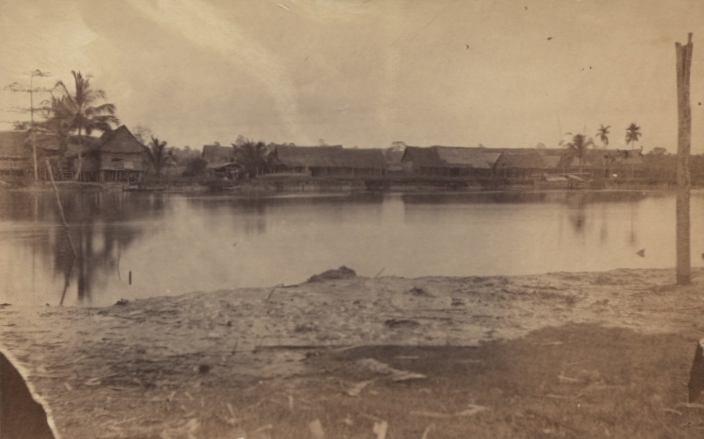
A Chinese village on Langat (Jugra) River, 1874.

Location of Langat River
- Dusun Tua
- Batu 14 Hulu Langat
- Cheras
- Bandar Tun Hussein Onn
- Kajang
- Bandar Baru Bangi
- Dengkil
- Cyberjaya
- Putrajaya
- Banting
- Telok Datok
- Telok Panglima Garang
- Jenjarom
- Jugra
- Carey Island
- Dengkil

== See also ==
- List of rivers of Malaysia
