= Carey Island =

Island in Malaysia

Native name: Pulau Carey ڤولاو كاري
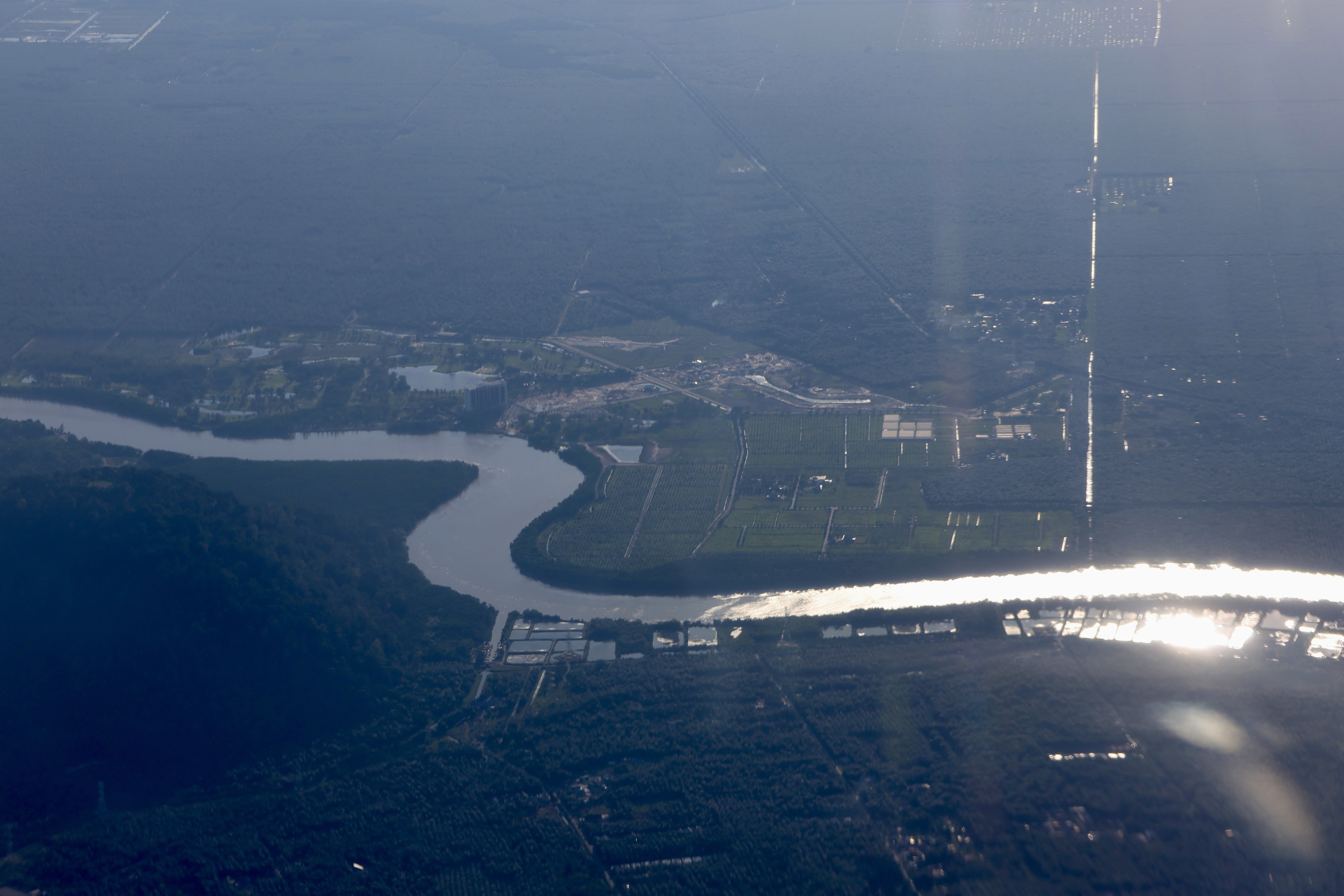
- Aerial view of Carey Island alongside Langat River (foreground) in 2023.
- Interactive map of Carey Island

Geography
- Location: Strait of Malacca
- Coordinates: 2°52′N 101°22′E

Administration
- Malaysia
- State: Selangor
- District: Kuala Langat
- Mukim: Jugra

Carey Island (Malay: Pulau Carey) (Old name as Telok Gonjeng) is an island in Selangor, Malaysia. It is administered by the Zone 17 of the Kuala Langat Municipal Council. Carey Island is located to the south of Port Klang and north of Banting town. It is a huge island separated from the Selangor coast by the Langat River, connected by two bridges from Chodoi and Telok Panglima Garang near Banting and a bridge from Pulau Indah and Pulau Carey.

== History ==
It was named after Edward Valentine John Carey, an English planter in Malaya who acquired the island from Sultan Sir Alaeddin Sulaiman Shah of Selangor to start rubber plantations. Since then, and until now, the island has been known as Carey Island or Pulau Carey. Carey began a plantation industry under the company Jugra Land and Carey Ltd. Rubber was introduced to Carey Island in 1905 and a permanent work force was established in 1907. Since the construction of a bridge to the mainland, the Carey Island is less isolated compared to other islands in the vicinity such as Crab Island.

== Features ==
It is famous for its seafood such as crabs, prawns, and various fishes. The island has palm oil plantations owned by Sime Darby Plantations. It is an initial settlement area for the Mah-Meri (pronounced [max mri]), one of the aborigine Orang Asli tribes of Malaysia. They have assimilated into modern life, with jobs in the nearby plantations and farms, but they retain their unique culture and way of life. Apart from exhibitions of their traditional dances and music, the Mah Meri are particularly known for their votive sculptures, fashioned from a kind of swamp hardwood known as "Nyireh Batu".

== See also ==
- List of islands of Malaysia
