= National Space Centre =

National Space Centre may refer to:

- British National Space Centre, the former space agency of the United Kingdom, replaced by the UK Space Agency.
- National Space Centre (England), a museum near Leicester
- National Space Centre (Malaysia), a mission control facility managed by the Malaysian Space Agency
- National Space Centre (Moscow), the headquarters of Roscosmos, Russia's national space agency
