= USS LST-326 =

LST-1-class landing ship tank

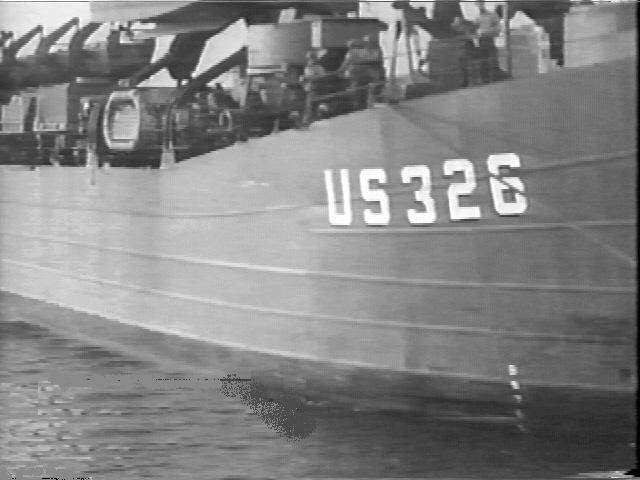
- USS LST-326 off Anzio on 15 April 1944

History

United States
- Name: LST-326
- Builder: Philadelphia Navy Yard, Philadelphia
- Laid down: 12 November 1942
- Launched: 11 February 1943
- Sponsored by: Mrs. Mildred E. Kelly
- Commissioned: 26 February 1943
- Decommissioned: 1 May 1946
- Stricken: 26 February 1946
- Identification: Callsign: NWZD
- Honors and awards: See Awards
- Fate: Transferred to Royal Navy, 18 December 1944

History

United Kingdom
- Name: LST-326
- Commissioned: 18 December 1944
- Decommissioned: 16 March 1946
- Fate: Returned to the United States

History

France
- Name: Liamone
- Namesake: Liamone
- Commissioned: 5 April 1946
- Decommissioned: 1951
- Reclassified: L9000
- Identification: Pennant number: K06

General characteristics
- Class & type: LST-1-class tank landing ship
- Displacement: 4,080 long tons (4,145 t) full load; 2,160 long tons (2,190 t) landing
- Length: 328 ft (100 m) oa
- Beam: 50 ft (15 m)
- Draft: Full load: 8 ft 2 in (2.49 m) forward; 14 ft 1 in (4.29 m) aft; Landing at 2,160 t: 3 ft 11 in (1.19 m) forward; 9 ft 10 in (3.00 m) aft
- Installed power: 2 × 900 hp (670 kW) Electro-Motive Diesel 12-567A diesel engines; 1,700 shp (1,300 kW)
- Propulsion: 1 × Falk main reduction gears; 2 × Propellers
- Speed: 12 kn (22 km/h; 14 mph)
- Range: 24,000 nmi (44,000 km; 28,000 mi) at 9 kn (17 km/h; 10 mph) while displacing 3,960 long tons (4,024 t)
- Boats & landing craft carried: 2 or 6 x LCVPs
- Capacity: 2,100 tons oceangoing maximum; 350 tons main deckload
- Troops: 16 officers, 147 enlisted men
- Complement: 13 officers, 104 enlisted men
- Armament: Varied, ultimate armament; 2 × twin 40 mm (1.57 in) Bofors guns; 4 × single 40 mm Bofors guns; 12 × 20 mm (0.79 in) Oerlikon cannons

USS LST-326 was a LST-1-class tank landing ship in the United States Navy during World War II. She was later sold to France as Liamone (K06).

== Construction and career ==
LST-326 was laid down on 12 November 1942 at Philadelphia Navy Yard, Philadelphia, Pennsylvania. Launched on 11 February 1943 and commissioned on 26 February 1943.

=== Service in the United States ===
LST-326 became a Coast Guard manned vessel after her crew and officers were exchanged with USS LST-175 on 25 August 1943.

During World War II, LST-223 was assigned to the Europe-Africa-Middle East theater. She took part in the Invasion of Sicilian from 9 to 15 July 1943.

She participated in the Anzio-Nettuno landings from 22 January to 2 February 1944 and the Invasion of Normandy from 6 to 25 June 1944.

LST-326 was decommissioned on 18 December 1944 and transferred to the Royal Navy.

She was struck from the Navy Register on 26 February 1946.

=== Service in the United Kingdom ===
HMS LST-326 was commissioned on 18 December 1944 and was part of W Task Force which participated in the recapture of Rangoon, before proceeding to the eventual invasion of Malaya at Morib and Port Swettenham, and to Singapore and Bangkok doing relief work repatriating ex P.O.W.s of the Japanese.

She was paid off to Singapore and returned to US Navy custody at Subic Bay, Philippines, 16 March 1946.

Not long after returning to the US, she was again sold to France on 5 April 1946.

=== Service in France ===
She was transferred to the French Navy and commissioned on 5 April 1946 with the name Liamone (K06) and later reclassified as L9000.

Liamone took part in the First Indochina War between 19 December 1946 to 1 August 1954.

The ship was out of service in 1951 and later sold for scrap.

== Awards ==
LST-326 have earned the following awards:

- American Campaign Medal
- Europe-Africa-Middle East Campaign Medal (3 battle stars)
- World War II Victory Medal

== Sources ==
- United States. Dept. of the Treasury (1962). Treasury Decisions Under the Customs, Internal Revenue, Industrial Alcohol, Narcotic and Other Laws, Volume 97. U.S. Government Printing Office.
- Moore, Capt. John (1984). Jane's Fighting Ships 1984-85. Jane's Information Group. ISBN 978-0710607959.
- Saunders, Stephen (2009). Jane's Fighting Ships 2009-2010. Jane's Information Group. ISBN 978-0710628886.
- Fairplay International Shipping Journal Volume 222. United Kingdom: Fairplay Publishing Limited. 1967.
