= Kuala Langat Municipal Council =

Local Authority in Kuala Langat District, Selangor, Malaysia

Kuala Langat Municipal Council Majlis Perbandaran Kuala Langat
- Local Government Act 1976

Type
- Type: Municipal council of Kuala Langat District

Leadership
- President: Amirul Azizan Abd Rahim
- Vice President: Khairul-Azam Bin Saroni

Structure
- Political groups: Councillors: PKR (11); DAP (7); Amanah (5); Orang Besar Kuala Langat (1)

Website
- www.mpkl.gov.my

Kuala Langat Municipal Council (Malay: Majlis Perbandaran Kuala Langat) is the municipal council which administers Kuala Langat District. This agency is under the purview of Selangor state government.

== History ==
Established on January 1, 1977, under the Local Government Act 1976 by a combination of 3 Local Councils: Sg. Jarom, Tanjung Sepat Local Council, Kuala Langat Municipal Board, Kuala Langat Sanitary Board.

Early establishment 3.7 square miles (9.6 km), 2001 increased to 62,294 km^{2} and 2006 increased to 857.70 km^{2} including 3 nautical miles.

== Administration ==
As 21st July 2023:

- President: Amirul Azizan Abd Rahim
  - Secretary Of President: Nor Asiah Mohd Salleh
- Vice President : Khairul-Azam Bin Saroni
  - Secretary Of Vice President: Nurul Asimah Suriyani
- Head Of Development Planning Department: Mohd Aszzwir Bin Mohd Sabiruddin
- Head Of Management Services Department: Fauzi Din
- Head Of Treasury Department: Kamarulzaman Ahmad
- Head Of Engineering Department: Zulkefli Mohamed Arif
- Head Of Community Development & Corporate Department: Hishamuddin Ismail
- Head Of Property Valuation and Management Department: Lisawati Abd Karim
- Head Of Building Control Department: Syamsol Herwan Ahmad
- Head Of Landscape Department: Mazlan Abdul Manap
- Head Of Licensing Department: Nordila Yasir
- Head Of Enforcement Department: Hashila Hamzah
- Head Of Solid Waste Management and Environmental Health Department: Norain Mohamed
- Head Of Local Central Unit (OSC): Nordin Hashim
- Head Of Internal Audit Unit: Mohaneswary Batumalai @ Subramaniam
- Head Of Building Commissioner Unit (COB): Mohd Shauki Jamaludin
- Head Of Procurement and Quantity Surveying Unit & Head Of Legal Unit: Mohammad Kamal Mohd Ramlan
- Head Of Information Technology Division: Mohd Firdaus Zainal Abidin

== Councilors ==
2020-2022 Session:

Zone	Councillor	Party
PKR 11 | DAP 7 | AMANAH 5 | Orang Besar Kuala Langat 1
1 Sijangkang west	Rogayah Ibrahim	AMANAH
2 Sijangkang east	Razali Ahmad	PKR
3 Rimbayu	Abu Bakar Mohamad	PKR
4 Telok Panglima Garang west	Lim Lip Suan	DAP
5 Telok Panglima Garang east	Norazmi Mohamed Tahir	PKR
6 Kampung Jenjarom	Haridass Ramasamy	PKR
7 Bandar Saujana Putra	Mohamed Alhaj Tengku Harun	Orang Besar Kuala Langat
8 Telok Panglima Garang central	Tan Wee King	DAP
9 Jenjarom Chinese village	Yong Keh Chyn	DAP
10 Seri Cheeding	Thanaletchumy Muthusamy	PKR
11 Paya Indah / Gamuda Cove	Panalsalwa R.Kuppan	PKR
12 Bukit Changgang	Nor Aishah Abdul Majid	AMANAH
13 Bandar Mahkota Banting	Gan Yee Chin	DAP
14 Telok Datok / Kota Seri Langat	Nadasan Subramaniam	DAP
15 Pulau Banting	Ang Lee Yong	DAP
16 Jugra	Abd.Razak Ramli	AMANAH
17 Pulau Carey	Sundaraju Veerapan	PKR
18 Morib	Mohd Afiq Mohd Tuniman	PKR
19 Bandar Banting	Lim Tou Yih	PKR
20 Sungai Lang	Naharanuar Ayob	PKR
21 Labohan Dagang / Bandar Seri Ehsan	Zulkipli Said	AMANAH
22 Kanchong Laut	Mohd Safiee Harun	AMANAH
23 Batu Laut	Rahimah Harun	PKR
24 Tanjong Sepat	Wong Kim Loon	DAP

== Zones ==
=== Zone 1 ===
- Taman Bayu Sijangkang
- Taman Sijangkang Permai
- Taman Desa Sijangkang
- Taman Sijangkang Damai
- Taman Desa Sijangkang 1
- Taman Medan Indah
- Taman Medan Jaya
- Taman Iram Perdana
- Taman Sijangkang Indah
- Taman Sijangkang 3
- Taman Sijangkang Idaman
- Kampung Sijangkang
- Kampung Medan

=== Zone 2 ===
- Taman Sijangkang Jaya
- Taman Perwira
- Taman Sri Medan
- Taman Desawira
- Taman Bentara
- Kampung Batu 9, Kebun Baru
- Kawasan Perusahaan Kebun Baru
- Taman Industri Sijangkang Utama
- Kawasan Perindustrian Telok Panglima Garang

=== Zone 3 ===
- Bandar Rimbayu
- Bandar Tropicana Aman
- Eco Sanctuary

=== Zone 4 ===
- Taman Indah Jaya
- Taman Aman
- Taman Halijahton
- Taman Dato' Hormat
- Kampung Telok Panglima Garang
- Kawasan Perusahaan Telok Mengkuang
- Telok Panglima Garang Free Trade Zone

=== Zone 5 ===
- Taman Srikandi
- Taman Satria
- Taman Nakhoda
- Taman Sejahtera
- Taman Rambai Indah
- Taman Kota
- Taman Makmur
- Taman Pahlawan
- Kampung Batu 10, Kebun Baru
- Kampung Sungai Rambai
- Kawasan Perindustrian Jenjarom

=== Zone 6 ===
- Taman Ria
- Taman Seri Jaromas
- Taman Jenjarom Permai
- Taman Amanah
- Taman Setia
- Kampung Jenjarom
- Kampung Orang Asli Bukit Kechil
- Tanjung Rabok
- Bukit Gagak
- Kawasan Perusahaan Batu 15, Jenjarom

=== Zone 7 ===
- Bandar Saujana Putra
- Taman Desa Kemandol
- Gamuda Kemuning
- Kampung Jaya Sepakat
- Kampung Orang Asli Desa Kemandol
- BSP Sky Park

=== Zone 8 ===
- Taman Pertiwi
- Taman Perkasa
- Taman Telok
- Taman Jaya Utama
- Taman Panglima
- Kawasan Perusahaan Batu 12, Sungai Rambai
- Kawasan Perusahaan Segenting

=== Zone 9 ===
- Taman Seri Rambai
- Taman Desa Jarom
- Taman Seri Jarom
- Taman Melati
- Taman Yayasan
- Taman Galing
- Taman Gembira
- Taman Bestari
- Kampung Baru Sungai Jarom
- Kampung Sungai Jarom
- Kawasan Perusahaan Ringan Jenjarom
- Kawasan Perusahaan Ringan Taman Yayasan

=== Zone 10 ===
- Taman Sentosa
- Taman Seri Cheeding
- Kampung Seri Cheeding
- Taman Perindustrian Sungai Sedu
- Kawasan Perusahaan Seri Cheeding

=== Zone 11 ===
- Paya Indah Wetland
- Taman Mas Langat
- Peatland Paradise
- Kampung Orang Asli Busut Baru
- Kampung Orang Asli Bukit Cheeding
- Kampung Orang Asli Pulau Kempas
- Bandar Gamuda Cove
- Taman Perindustrian Putra

=== Zone 12 ===
- Taman Changgang Jaya
- Taman D'Menara
- Taman Langat Murni
- Taman Langat Utama 1,2,3,4,5
- Taman Seri Changgang 1,2,3
- Taman Seri Dagang 1
- Taman Seri Maju
- Kampung Bukit Changgang
- RTB Bukit Changgang
- Kampung Orang Asli Bukit Serdang
- Kawasan Perusahaan Olak Lempit
- Taman Industri Langat Utama

=== Zone 13 ===
- Taman Merbah
- Taman Bajuri
- Taman Nuri Indah
- Taman Desa Idaman
- Taman Cenderawasih
- Taman Merpati
- Bandar Mahkota Banting
- Kampung Olak Lempit
- Kampung Orang Asli Mutus Tua
- Kompleks Perabot Olak Lempit
- Kawasan Perusahaan Mega Steel

=== Zone 14 ===
- Taman Seri
- Bandar Sungai Emas
- Taman Langat Jaya
- Taman Seri Manggis
- Taman Manggis Jaya
- Kota Seri Langat
- Taman Bakti
- Taman Periang
- Taman Langat Indah
- Kampung Sungai Manggis
- Kampung Orang Asli Bukit Perah
- Kawasan Perusahaan Bandar Mahkota Banting
- Kawasan Perusahaan Bandar Sungai Emas

=== Zone 15 ===
- Taman Seri Bunut
- Taman Banting Mewah
- Taman Mulia
- Taman Muhibbah
- Taman Sari
- Taman Delima
- Taman Seri Pelangi
- Taman Nilam
- Kampung Banting
- Kampung Orang Asli Pulau Banting
- Kawasan Perusahaan Ringan (Taman Muhibbah Banting)

=== Zone 16 ===
- Taman Seri Sawah
- Taman Jugra Jaya
- Taman Desa Permatang Jaya
- Taman Banting Baru
- Taman Jugra Indah
- Taman Chodoi Bestari
- Taman Permai
- Kampung Bandar
- Kampung Sungai Buaya
- Kampung Permatang Pasir
- Kampung Sawah
- Kampung Seri Jugra

=== Zone 17 ===
- Kampung Melayu Pulau Carey
- Kampung Orang Asli Sungai Kurau
- Kampung Orang Asli Sungai Judah
- Kampung Orang Asli Sungai Rambai
- Kampung Orang Asli Kepau Laut
- Kampung Sungai Bumbun
- Sime Darby Biodiesel Sdn Bhd
- Sime Darby Plantation Academy
- Amverton Cove Golf & Island Resort

=== Zone 18 ===
- Taman Damai Indah
- Taman Seri Bayu
- Taman Seri Desa
- Taman Seri Muhibbah, Kelanang
- Taman Sepakat
- Taman Seri Kelanang
- Taman Cemara
- Taman Harmoni
- Taman Bayu Indah
- Taman Bahagia
- Kampung Tali Air
- Kampung Morib
- Kampung Kelanang
- KOA Permatang Buah
- KOA Telok Tongkah
- Hotel Impian Morib
- El Azhar Camp
- Bandar Peranginan Seri Morib

=== Zone 19 ===
- Taman Kemuning
- Taman Budiman
- Taman Cempaka
- Taman Beringin
- Taman Aman
- Taman Gembira
- Taman Baiduri
- Taman Setia Jaya
- Taman Banting Jaya
- Taman Seri Putra
- Taman Seri Banting
- Kawasan Perusahaan Banting
- Pusat Perniagaan Suasa
- Pasar Banting

=== Zone 20 ===
- Taman Desa Jaya
- Taman Bersatu
- Taman Teratai
- Taman Mawar
- Kampung Sungai Lang Baru
- Kampung Sungai Lang Tengah
- Kampung Sungai Kelambu

=== Zone 21 ===
- Bandar Seri Ehsan
- Taman Seri Dagang 2
- Taman Seri Dagang 3
- Kampung Labohan Dagang
- Kampung Orang Asli Bukit Tadom
- Kampung Orang Asli Paya Rumput
- Kawasan Perusahaan Genting Sanyen

=== Zone 22 ===
- Taman Mesra
- Taman Seri Damai
- Taman Kenanga
- Taman Orkid
- Taman Damai
- Kampung Kanchong Tengah
- Kampung Kanchong Darat
- Kampung Endah
- Gold Coast Morib Resort

=== Zone 23 ===
- Taman Seri Kundang
- Kampung Ladang Batu
- Kampung Batu Laut
- Kampung Kundang

=== Zone 24 ===
- Taman Pelangi
- Taman Tanjung
- Taman Seri Tanjung
- Taman Mutiara
- Kampung Baru Tanjung Sepat
- Kampung Tanjung Sepat Darat
- Kampung Tumbuk Darat/Tumbuk Pantai
- Kampung Orang Asli Tanjung Sepat
- Kawasan Perusahaan Tanjung Sepat

=== Areas That Under Orang Besar's Responsibility ===
- Istana Jugra
- Istana Bandar
- Masjid Bandar
- Istana Morib
- Tomb Of Sultan Abdul Samad

== Branch ==
- Bandar Saujana Putra
  - Head: Wan Putara Noor Shahan Ngadirin

== Legislation ==
Acts

- 13 June 1974: Act 133, Roads, Drains and Buildings Act 1974
- 25 March 1976: Act 171, Local Government Act 1976
- 25 March 1976: Act 172, Town and Country Planning Act 1976
- 14 April 2007: Act 663, Building & Common Property (Maintenance & Operators) Act
