= Sultan Abdul Samad Mausoleum =

Mausoleum in Malaysia

Sultan Abdul Samad Mausoleum Makam Sultan Abdul Samad

Religion
- Affiliation: Islam
- Leadership: Selangor Royal Family

Location
- Location: Jugra, Banting, Selangor, Malaysia

Architecture
- Type: Royal Mausoleum
- Style: Moorish; Local Malay
- Dome: 3

Sultan Abdul Samad Mausoleum (Malay: Makam Sultan Abdul Samad) is a royal mausoleum located in Bukit Jugra in Jugra, Selangor, Malaysia. Since 1886, it has served as the final resting place for several members of the Selangor royal family.

== Graves/Tombs ==
=== Sultans ===
- Sultan Abdul Samad Shah ibni Almarhum Raja Panglima Besar Raja Haji Abdullah (died 1898)

=== Tengku Ampuan/Tengku Pemaisuri graves (Graves of Royal Consorts) ===
- Tunku Maharum binti Al-Marhum Tunku Dhiauddin al-Mukarram Shah (died 1908) - Tengku Ampuan of Selangor 1898 - "Tengku Ampuan Paduka Seri Negara" 1903
- Raja Arfah binti Al-Marhum Sultan Muhammad Shah - (died 1913)
- Che Fatimah binti Haji Abdul Ghani - (died 1912)

=== Royal family members ===
- Raja Haji Sir Musa Ghaittuddin Riayat Shah I ibni Sultan Abdul Samad - Raja Muda of Selangor VI (Crown Prince) of Selangor (died 07 July 1884)
- Raja Tipah - (died 1860)
- Raja Munah - (died 1861)
- Raja Abu Nusah - (died 1877)
- Raja Arfah - (died 26 September 1896)
- Raja Yaakub - Tengku Alang (died 1902)
- Raja Nuteh - (died 1927)
- Raja Nong - (died 1927)
- Raja Mahmud - (died 1955)
- Raja Daud - (died 1900)
- Raja Abdul Kahar - Tok Penghulu of Mukim Hulu Langat XXX (died 1927)
- Raja Alfah - (died 1927)
- Cik Puan Hasnah [Aminah] binti Pilong, Makam Bandar - wife of Sultan Alaeddin Sulaiman of Selangor and mother of Sultan Hisammuddin of Selangor - (died 1900)
- Tengku Badar Shah ibni Sultan Haji Sir Alaeddin Sulaiman Shah II - Raja Bendahara of Selangor (died 30 October 1945)
