= Sijangkang =

Human settlement in Malaysia

- Village
- Kampung Sijangkang
- Interactive map of Sijangkang
- Coordinates: 2°56′36″N 101°27′24″E
- Country: Malaysia
- State: Selangor
- District: Kuala Langat
- Time zone: UTC+8 (MST)
  - Summer (DST): Not observed
- Postcode: 42500

Sijangkang in Kuala Langat District

Sijangkang or the full name Kampung Sijangkang, is a place in Kuala Langat District, Selangor, Malaysia. The village is under Mukim Telok Panglima Garang (subdistrict) and being administered by Zone 1 and 2 (west and east) of Kuala Langat Municipal Council.

Sijangkang is essentially a Javanese-Malay village and it is believed to have been founded about 1900. The name Sijangkang comes from a plant that is similar to a rubber tree plant. It is a forest tree whose seeds are spread by explosion. Name of the tree is Jangkang. This tree may found in some parts of Indonesia.

Still related to the first opinion. In the Malay language, the word "Si" can function as a definite article, particularly for people or even objects as a diminutive suffix, positively or negatively, depending on the context. For example, si Bunga Kasturi in classical Malay, or just si Ahmad, si Kiah, si Comel, si Tanggang, si Kecil, si Durhaka, si Tertuduh, si Kancil etc. The Jangkang trees die in a tributary river that was later given the name of Sungai Jangkang or Jangkang River. In Chinese, death is referred to as 'SI'. Thus some people say that the dead Jangkang trees could have also probably given rise to the name Si Jangkang which eventually turned into Sijangkang - coincidentally or otherwise.
