= Morib =

Malaysian beach

Coordinates: 2.751952°N 101.442945°E

Morib in Kuala Langat District

Morib is a mukim in Kuala Langat District, Selangor, Malaysia, under the administration of Zone 18 of Kuala Langat Municipal Council. Morib Beach is a quiet seaside tourist attraction. It was one of the first landing points on the west coast for the British and Indian Army liberation forces during end of World War II in 1945. It is a small but suitable beach for swimming. Morib is a state constituency in Selangor, Malaysia, that has been represented in the Selangor State Legislative Assembly since 1959.

It is located near Simpang Morib, which is about 10 km from the town of Banting. Morib attracts more than 10000 visitors annually notably during the month of August, festive seasons and public holidays.

Recognisable people noted for their presence on this beach include the Honourable Leader of the National Boys Scout, former Malaysian Education Minister Datuk Shafie Salleh.

== Attractions ==
Some seafood restaurants can be found on the beach serving an array of seafood.

The town of Morib also has a hotel resort known as Gold Coast Morib, with features such as a water theme park, flying fox cables, and a kayaking pond.
