= National Space Centre (Malaysia) =

Space facility in Kuala Langat, Selangor, Malaysia

Coordinates: 2°47′07″N 101°30′28″E

The National Space Centre or Pusat Angkasa Negara is a Malaysian mission control facility. This 400-acre (160-hectare) centre is located at Sungai Lang near Banting, Selangor and is managed by the Malaysian Space Agency (MYSA). The space centre started construction in 2004 and completed phase I of the project in 2005.

== Facilities ==
The facility contains a Mission Control Facility (MCF) that allows communications with satellites and remote networking with other agencies in the country. The facility also collaborates with European Space Agency (ESA) in the monitoring of the GIOVE-A satellite. The Optical Calibration Laboratory was constructed in 2006 to calibrate the optical system of a satellite.
