= Jugra =

Town in Selangor, Malaysia

Coordinates: 2°49′N 101°25′E

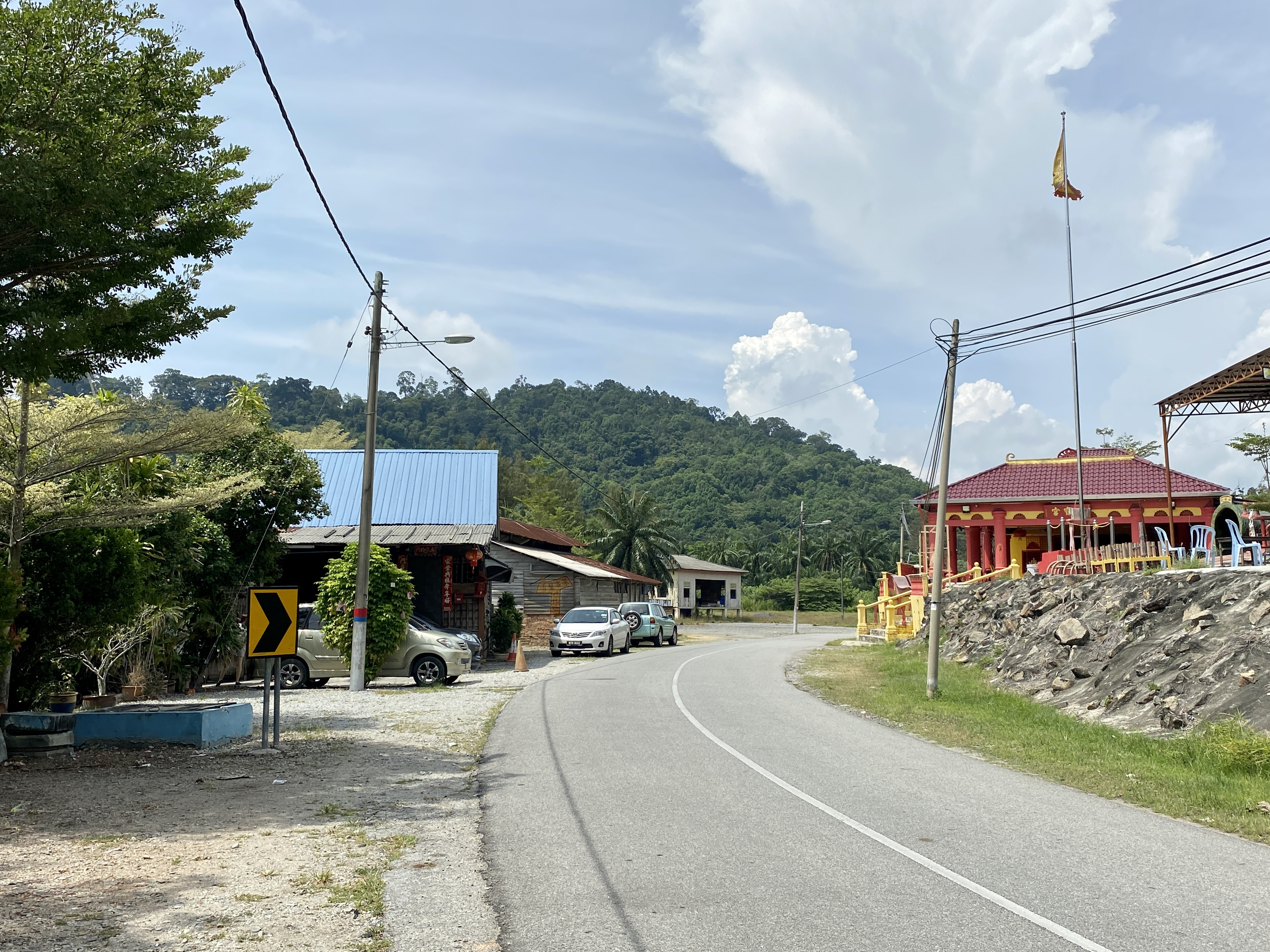
Jugra

Jugra in Kuala Langat District

Jugra (Jawi: جوڬرا) is a mukim, historical town and a former royal town in Kuala Langat District, Selangor, Malaysia. It is separated from Pulau Carey by the Langat River. The town is administered by the Zone 16 of the Kuala Langat Municipal Council.

== History ==
Jugra was the royal capital of Selangor when the then ruling monarch, Sultan Abdul Samad, built Istana Jugra (Jugra Palace) and moved there in 1875. It was situated in a strategic location, not exactly at the river mouth but easily accessible from the Straits of Malacca, and protected by a hill, Bukit Jugra; which stands clearly out above the low-lying mangrove swamps.

For centuries, it served as a familiar landmark to navigators of the Straits of Malacca. Chinese, Arab and European mariners marked it in their charts; Bukit Jugra was also known to many foreign navigators as Parcelar Hill, derived from the Arabic name for it, balasar.

It was during this time that Jugra also briefly became the centre of British administration in Selangor, although this was soon moved to Klang and, a decade later, to Kuala Lumpur. The Sultan continued to live at Jugra until he died in 1898, and the new Sultan, Sultan Alauddin Sulaiman Shah also known as Sultan Sulaiman was proclaimed there. This was the last important occasion in Jugra. Sultan Alauddin Sulaiman subsequently moved his official residence to the Istana Alam Shah in Klang further north in 1905, where he lived for the next 35 years.

Despite its historical impact, Jugra quickly shrank to become a backcountry, as even the Kuala Langat constituency's administration was relocated to Banting.

== Places of interest ==
Among places of interest in this quaint town are royal palaces such as Istana Bandar, Makam Sultan Abdul Samad, a royal mausoleum, and mosques such as Masjid Alaeddin. The nearby Bukit Jugra is also used for paragliding.

== Access ==
=== Car ===
Federal Route 5 from Klang or Port Dickson, and SKVE from Kajang or Putrajaya.

=== Public transportation ===
Rail transit services are unavailable in Jugra, and rapidKL buses do not ply this area, but Smart Selangor buses (route BTG2), a free bus service subsidized by the Selangor state government, connects the nearby hamlet of Permatang Pasir (about 2 km east) to Banting town. From Banting town, passengers can then switch to another Smart Selangor route (route BTG1) which goes to KLIA 2 and ERL Salak Tinggi.
