= Jenjarom =

Town in Selangor, Malaysia

Coordinates: 2°53′N 101°30′E

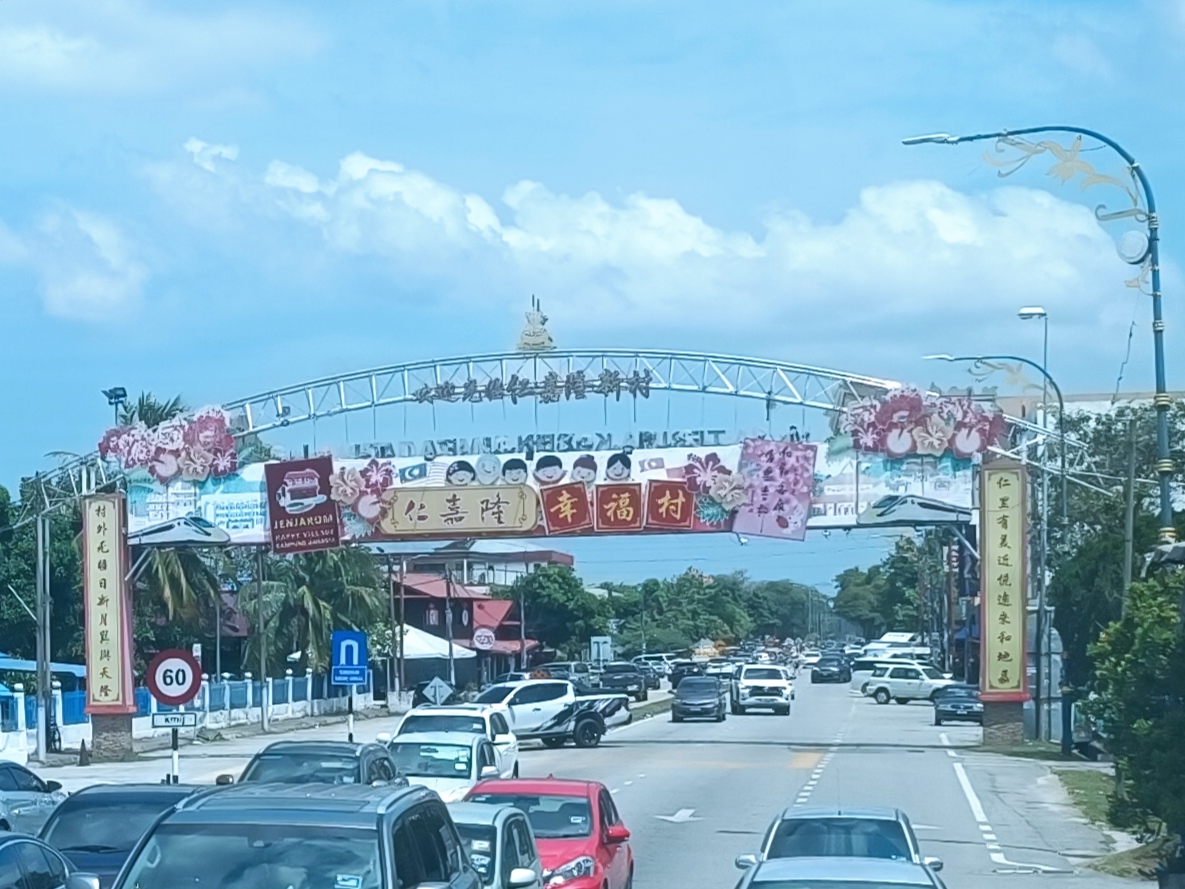
Jenjarom

Jenjarom in Kuala Langat District

Jenjarom is a town located under Mukim Telok Panglima Garang and Mukim Tanjong Duabelas I in the Kuala Langat District of Selangor state in Malaysia. Around 95% of the 30,000 residents are Hokkien Chinese and the Hokkien dialect is the main language used locally (although Malaysian Mandarin as well as the national language, Bahasa Malaysia are widely spoken by its multi-ethnic residents from three main ethnicities acting as a lingua franca). The town also administered by the Zones 9, 10 (Chinese) and 6 (Malay) of the Kuala Langat Municipal Council.

The majority of the town's Hokkien population trace their roots to the Fujianese counties of Yongchun, Anxi, Nan'an and Dehua. Other residents are mostly native ethnic Malays of Javanese, Minang, Banjarese and Bugis descent, fellow ethnic Chinese of Hakka or Teochew descent, with a small Indian community of both predominantly Hindu Tamils and Punjabi Sikhs.

== History ==
In the early 20th century, Jenjarom was an agricultural village, with around a dozen shops along the main street. Pig farming was significant in the surrounding areas. Fewer than 20 families were Chinese.

During the Malayan Emergency in the 1950s, as part of the Briggs Plan to cut off supplies to the (mostly Chinese) Communist insurgents, New Villages were set up to segregate rural Chinese villagers from the insurgents. Jenjarom was one of them and is today the largest such 'village' in the state. In 1950 and 1951 the population grew rapidly to around 5,000.

In the early years of independent Malaysia, on 26 April 1967, Prime Minister Tunku Abdul Rahman visited the burgeoning town and announced an upgrade to its infrastructure, which was then implemented under the Second Malaysia Plan.

Industrial activity in Jenjarom increased, along with the development of palm oil production in the surrounding land.

In the 1990s, following a period of high youth unemployment, the town became known for various social ills, including gangsterism, gambling, prostitution and drug trafficking. In the nine years to 2000, Jenjarom's population more than doubled, to 24,483. By the turn of the century, these troubles had abated.

== Attractions ==
Jenjarom is the site of the Fo Guang Shan Dong Zen Temple (佛光山東禪寺) and Institute in Sungai Jarom. Though this predominantly serves the Chinese Buddhist population, the non-Chinese community benefits from the tourism it attracts: there were about a quarter of a million visitors in 2004. There are also several prominent Chinese Temples like Ban Siew Keng Temple (仁嘉隆萬壽宮) and Tung Loh Temple (仁嘉隆铜锣庙) located in Jenjarom.

== Illegal plastic waste processing ==
In the months following China's January 2018 banning of nearly all plastic waste imports, around 40 factories sprung up around Jenjoram to take up some of the business. Often hidden in the local palm oil plantations, 90% had no permits, as Malaysia suddenly became one of the world's biggest plastic importers.

In many cases, existing Chinese waste processing businesses relocated to Jenjarom, attracted by its proximity to Port Klang - Malaysia's largest port and the entry point for most of its plastic imports - together with the cultural fit of the town's Chinese business population, and allegedly corruptible officials.

Unrecyclable plastics should be sent to waste centres but Jenjarom's illegal operations simply burned them, releasing poisonous and carcinogenic fumes into the atmosphere, causing respiratory complaints and skin rashes among local people. Several local fish and prawn business lost all their stock, apparently due to toxic wastewater from the factories. When 33 of the plants were closed down, more than 17,000 tonnes of the waste was left behind as an unresolved problem for authorities. Most of the operations quickly reopened nearby.

== Education ==
=== Primary schools ===
- Sekolah Jenis Kebangsaan (Cina) Jenjarom (short form: 'SJK(C) Jenjarom'), established 1924
- Sekolah Jenis Kebangsaan (Tamil) Jenjarom, originally housed within SJK(C) Jenjarom.
- Sekolah Kebangsaan Jenjarom
- Sekolah Jenis Kebangsaan (Cina) Bukit Fraser (Kuala Langat) (short form: 'SJK(C) Bukit Fraser'), established 2022

=== Secondary schools ===
- Sekolah Menengah Kebangsaan Jenjarom
- Sekolah Menengah Kebangsaan Bandar Saujana Putra
