= Panglima Garang (state constituency) =

Selangor constituency

Defunct state constituency
- Legislature: Selangor State Legislative Assembly
- Constituency created: 1974
- Constituency abolished: 1995
- First contested: 1974
- Last contested: 1990

Panglima Garang was a state constituency in Selangor, Malaysia, that was represented in the Selangor State Legislative Assembly from 1974 to 1995.

The state constituency was created in the 1974 redistribution and was mandated to return a single member to the Selangor State Legislative Assembly under the first past the post voting system.

== History ==
=== Representation history ===
Members of the Legislative Assembly for Panglima Garang
Assembly	No	Years	Member	Party
Constituency created from Telok Datoh
4th	N28	1974-1978	Mohamed Kamil Abdul Ghani	BN (UMNO)
5th	N28	1978-1982	Mohamed Kamil Abdul Ghani	BN (UMNO)
6th	N28	1982-1986	Tarikh Mohd. Jonid	BN (UMNO)
7th	N37	1986-1990	Eng Hoi Choo (黃海助)	BN (MCA)
8th	N37	1990-1995	Tarikh Mohd. Jonid	APU (S46)
Constituency abolished, renamed to Sijangkang

== Election results ==
Selangor state election, 1990
Party	Candidate	Votes	%	∆%
S46	Tarikh Mohd. Jonid	6,246	52.79	▲52.79
BN	Eng Hoi Choo	5,586	47.21	▼14.69
Total valid votes		11,832	100.00	
Total rejected ballots		552		
Unreturned ballots		0		
Turnout		12,384	80.26	▲3.75
Registered electors		15,430		
Majority		660	5.58	▼33.09
S46 gain from BN		Swing		?

Selangor state election, 1986
Party	Candidate	Votes	%	∆%
BN	Eng Hoi Choo	6,069	61.90	▲61.90
PAS	Khalil Mohd Saleh	2,278	23.24	▲13.41
Independent	Mohd Khaidzer Ibrahim	1,457	14.86	▲13.39
Total valid votes		9,804	100.00	
Total rejected ballots		456		
Unreturned ballots		0		
Turnout		10,260	76.51	▼1.34
Registered electors		13,410		
Majority		3,791	38.67	▲6.47
BN hold		Swing		

Selangor state election, 1982
Party	Candidate	Votes	%	∆%
BN	Tarikh Mohd. Junid	5,170	60.45	
Independent	Shukri Tahir	2,416	28.25	
PAS	Mohamad Shapik Siraj	841	9.83	
Independent	Gan Keck Tiong	126	1.47	
Total valid votes		8,553	100.00	
Total rejected ballots		274		
Unreturned ballots		0		
Turnout		8,827	77.85	
Registered electors		11,338		
Majority		2,754	32.20	
BN hold		Swing		

Selangor state election, 1978
Party	Candidate	Votes	%	∆%
On the nomination day, Mohamed Kamil Abdul Ghani won uncontested.
BN	Mohamed Kamil Abdul Ghani			
Total valid votes			100.00	
Total rejected ballots				
Unreturned ballots				
Turnout				
Registered electors				
Majority				
BN hold		Swing		

Selangor state election, 1974
Party	Candidate	Votes	%
BN	Mohamed Kamil Abdul Ghani	3,025	60.04
Independent	Low Sek Chee	1,750	34.74
Independent	Mohamed Sidek Palil	222	4.41
PEKEMAS	Mohsinon Tahir	41	0.81
Total valid votes		5,038	100.00
Total rejected ballots		129	
Unreturned ballots		0	
Turnout		5,167	76.86
Registered electors		6,723	
Majority		1,275	25.31
This was a new constituency created.
