= Telok Panglima Garang =

Mukim in Kuala Langat District, Selangor, Malaysia

Coordinates: 2°55′N 101°28′E

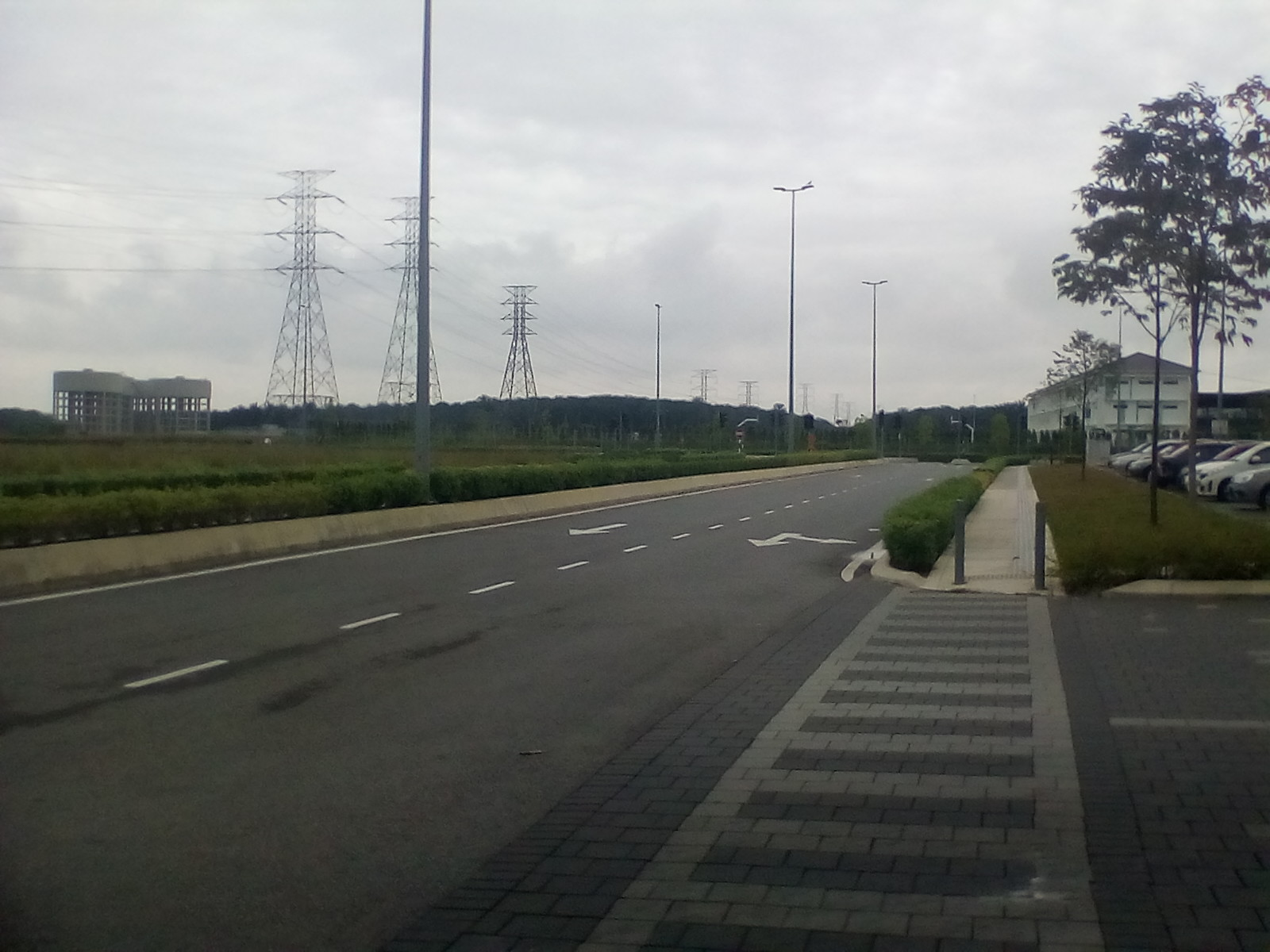
Bandar Tropicana Aman located at Telok Panglima Garang.

Telok Panglima Garang in Kuala Langat District

Telok Panglima Garang (lit. 'Bay of The Fierce Panglima') is a city and mukim in Kuala Langat District, Selangor, Malaysia. The Telok Panglima Garang Free Trade Zone (FTZ) is located here. The town is administered by the Zone 4, 5 and 8 of the Kuala Langat Municipal Council.

== Transportation ==
Telok Panglima Garang is served by Klang-Banting Highway (Federal Route 5), linking the town with Banting in the south and Klang to the north. In 2012, the town was connected by South Klang Valley Expressway, providing access to Shah Alam, Kuala Lumpur and Putrajaya.
