= Telok Datok =

Administrative capital in Malaysia

Coordinates: 2°49′05″N 101°31′10″E

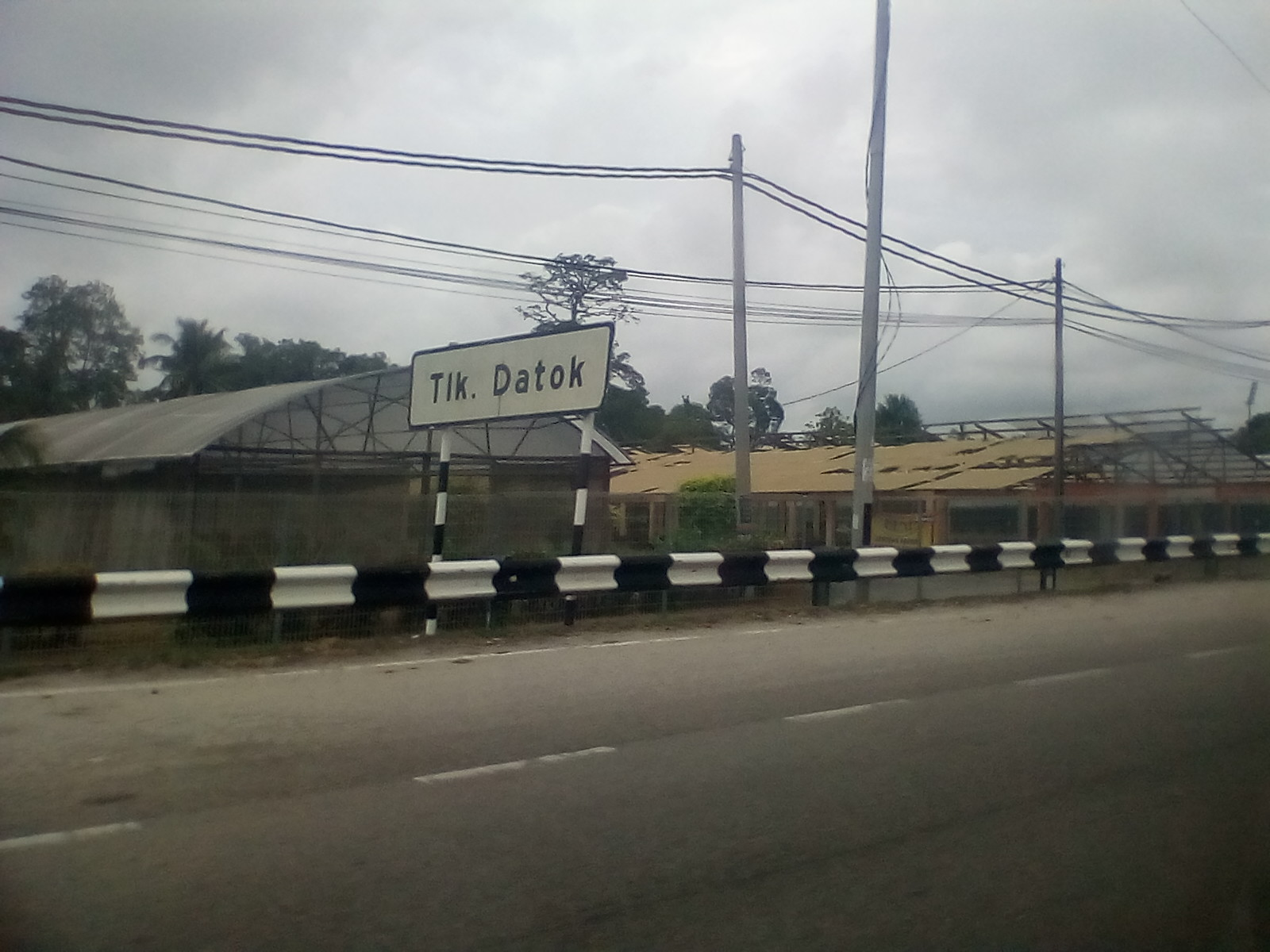
Telok Datok sign.

Telok Datok is the administrative capital of Kuala Langat District, Selangor, Malaysia. The postcode is 42700. The suburb is administered by the Zone 14 of the Kuala Langat Municipal Council along with the future administration centre of Kota Seri Langat.

An architectural feature of Telok Datuk is the old colonial Police Station, which has been refurnished and now houses the local Giat MARA facility.

== History ==
In 2016, a local Telok Datok government assemblyman was sacked due to corruption.
