= Kuala Langat District =

- District of Selangor
- Daerah Kuala Langat
- Seal
- Interactive map of Kuala Langat District
- Location of Kuala Langat District in Malaysia
- Coordinates: 2°50′N 101°30′E
- Country: Malaysia
- State: Selangor
- Seat: Teluk Datok
- Largest town: Banting
- Local area government(s): Kuala Langat Municipal Council

Government
  - District officer: Rosli Othman
  - Sultan's Representative: Mohamed Al Haj Harun

Area
  - Total: 858 km^{2} (331 sq mi)

Population (2020)
  - Total: 307,787
  - Density: 359/km^{2} (929/sq mi)
- Time zone: UTC+8 (MST)
  - Summer (DST): UTC+8 (Not observed)
- Postcode: 425xx-428xx, 471xx
- Calling code: +6-03-31, +6-03-51, +6-03-5614, +6-03-80
- Vehicle registration plates: B

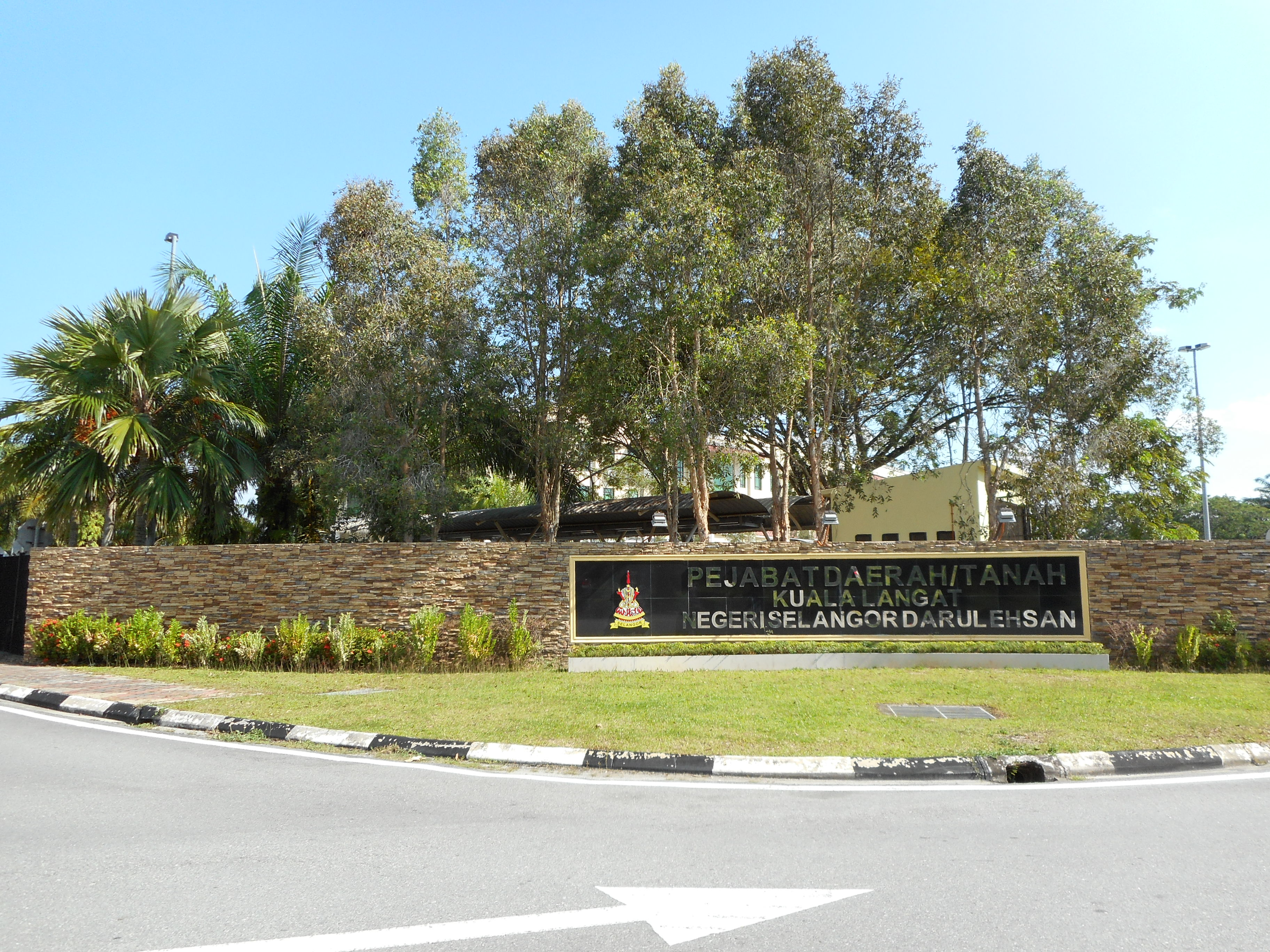
Kuala Langat District and Land Office

The Kuala Langat District is a district of Selangor, Malaysia. It is situated in the southwestern part of Selangor. It covers an area of 858 square kilometres, and had a population of 307,787 at the 2020 Census (exclude foreign). It is bordered by the districts of Klang and Petaling to the north and Sepang to the east. The Strait of Malacca forms its western border.

Among the major towns in Kuala Langat are Banting, Jugra, Telok Datok, Morib and an island Carey Island.

== Administrative divisions ==

Kuala Langat District is divided into 7 mukims, which are:

- Bandar
- Batu
- Jugra
- Kelanang
- Morib
- Tanjong Duabelas
- Telok Panglima Garang

== Cities and towns ==

Kuala Langat District has cities and town, which are:

- Banting (City)
- Jenjarom (City)
- Sijangkang (City)
- Tanjong Sepat (City)
- Telok Panglima Garang (City)
- Batu (Town)
- Bukit Changgang (Town)
- Chodoi (Town)
- Jenjarom (Town)
- Kanchong (Town)
- Kanchong Darat (Town)
- Kelanang Batu Enam (Town)
- Morib (Town)
- Permatang Pasir (Town)
- Sijangkang (Town)
- Simpang Morib (Town)
- Sungai Manggis (Town)
- Sungai Raba (Town)
- Tanjong Duabelas (Town)
- Telok Datok (Town)
- Tongkah (Town)
- Telok (Town)

== Demographics ==
Historical population
Year	Pop.	±%
1991	130,090	—
2000	192,176	+47.7%
2010	220,214	+14.6%
2020	307,787	+39.8%

== Land use ==
Kuala Langat is predominantly an agricultural district, with the main crop being oil-palm. In addition, Kuala Langat has several forest reserves, including the Kuala Langat North Forest Reserve and the Kuala Langat South Forest Reserve, both of which are important for the conservation of flora and fauna.

== Tourist attractions ==
Kuala Langat is famous for its agricultural produce, industries that recycle scrap metal, home stay programmes for tourists and for its National Space Centre in Kanchong Darat. Local farmers transform scrap metal from cars, electronics and other household appliances into large 12 meter transformers.

- Malaysia Paragliding Flight Park
- Sentoria Morib Resort City
- Amverton Cove Golf & Island Resort

== Infrastructure ==
Putrajaya and the Kuala Lumpur International Airport (KLIA), linked by new highways, have become the catalyst for Kuala Langat's development. Road networks and infrastructure in the district are good, making it viable for manufacturers to transport their finished goods on freight trucks to Kuala Lumpur, KLIA and Port Klang.

Bandar Saujana Putra, located in the far-north of the district, was established in 2003 by LBS Bina Berhad and is located near Putra Heights, UEP Subang Jaya (USJ) and Puchong, as well as Cyberjaya, Putrajaya, and Telok Panglima Garang.

The Telok Panglima Garang Free Trade Zone, industries manufacturing electronic components and car parts have created many job opportunities for locals.

Morib is being moulded into an education hub and that plans were afoot to set up a few educational institutions in Jugra. Currently, there is the Kuala Langat Community College and Industrial Training Institute. Other institutions being built are a matriculation college, a polytechnic and a MARA skills training institute.

Kota Kemuning is a township located in the constituency of Kota Raja developed by Hicom-Gamuda Development Sdn Bhd in 1994 and is renowned as one of the Klang Valley's finest residences with its healthy and harmonious living environment.

Bandar Rimbayu dubbed as "The Township Nature Perfected" is a 1,879-acre premier township situated adjacent to Kota Kemuning is a development that consists of a mixed development of residential, commercial, recreational and parkland components. The township is spread over 4 precincts: Flora, Fauna, Bayu and Commercial Hub. Surrounded by 4 major highways to Kuala Lumpur City Centre, Subang, Petaling Jaya, Damansara, Puchong, Shah Alam and Klang Valley gives the township excellent connectivity.

== Federal Parliament and State Assembly Seats ==
Kuala Langat, Selangor Parliament and State Assembly Electoral Districts

List of Kuala Langat district representatives in the Federal Parliament (Dewan Rakyat)

Parliament	Seat Name	Member of Parliament	Party
P112	Kuala Langat	Ahmad Yunus Hairi	Perikatan Nasional (PAS)
P113	Sepang	Aiman Athirah Sabu	Pakatan Harapan (AMANAH)

List of Kuala Langat district representatives in the State Legislative Assembly (Dewan Undangan Negeri)

Parliament	State	Seat Name	State Assemblyman	Party
P112	N51	Sijangkang (Telok Panglima Garang)	Ahmad Yunus Hairi	Perikatan Nasional (PAS)
P112	N52	Banting	Papparaidu Veraman	Pakatan Harapan (DAP)
P112	N53	Morib	Roznizan Ahmad	Perikatan Nasional (BERSATU)
P113	N54	Tanjong Sepat	Borhan bin Ahmad Shah	Pakatan Harapan (PKR)
P113	N55	Dengkil	Jamil Salleh	Perikatan Nasional (BERSATU)

== Education ==
Banting

Primary School :

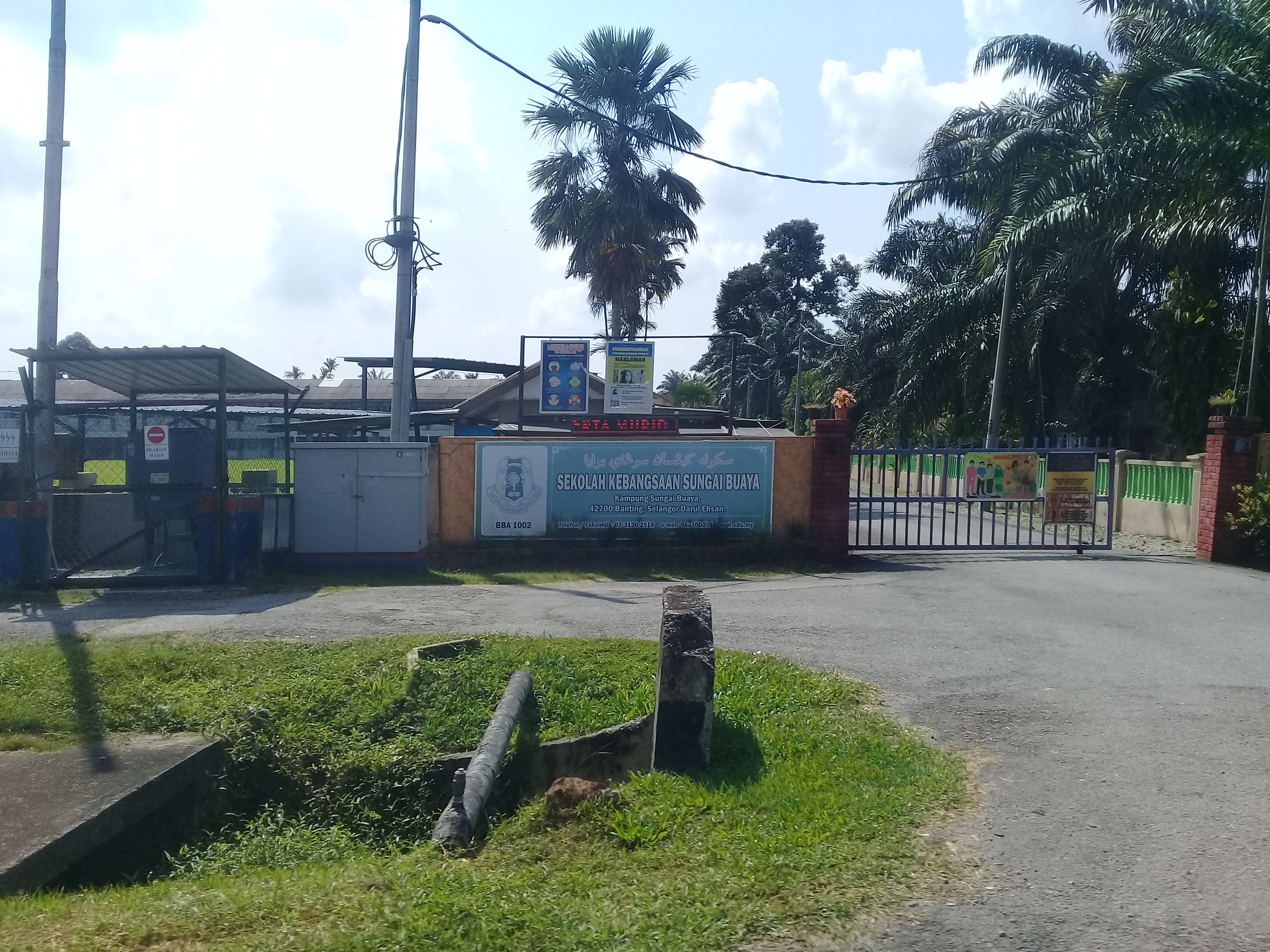
SK Sungai Buaya 2022

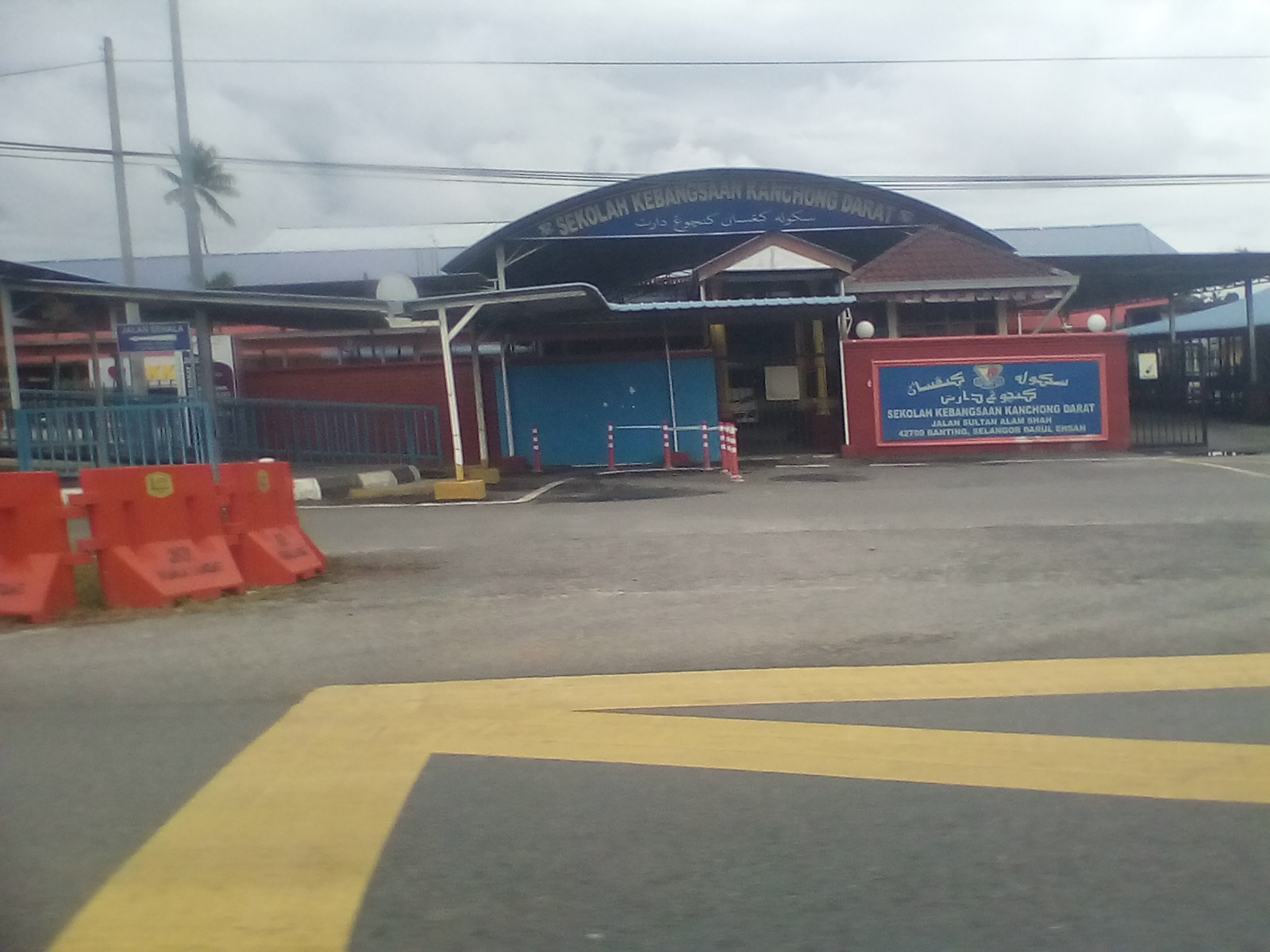
SK Kanchong Darat 2021

- Sekolah Kebangsaan Bandar Banting
- Sekolah Kebangsaan Sri Langat
- Sekolah Kebangsaan Sungai Buaya
- Sekolah Kebangsaan Kanchong Tengah
- Sekolah Kebangsaan Kanchong Darat
- Sekolah Kebangsaan Jugra
- Sekolah Kebangsaan Bukit Cheeding
- Sekolah Jenis Kebangsaan (Tamil) Sungai Sedu
- Sekolah Jenis Kebangsaan (Tamil) Sungai Buaya
- Sekolah Jenis Kebangsaan (Tamil) Sungai Manggis
- Sekolah Jenis Kebangsaan (Tamil) Telok Datok
- Sekolah Jenis Kebangsaan (Tamil) Simpang Morib
- Sekolah Jenis Kebangsaan (Tamil) Jugra
- Sekolah Jenis Kebangsaan (Cina) Tiong Nam
- Sekolah Jenis Kebangsaan (Cina) Choong Hua
- Sekolah Rendah Agama Kanchong Tengah
- Sekolah Rendah Agama Kanchong Darat
- Sekolah Rendah Agama At-Taqwa
- Sekolah Agama KAFA Sungai Lang Baru
- Sekolah Rendah Agama Seri Jugra

Secondary School :

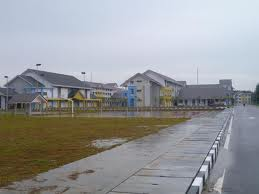
SM Sains Banting 2012

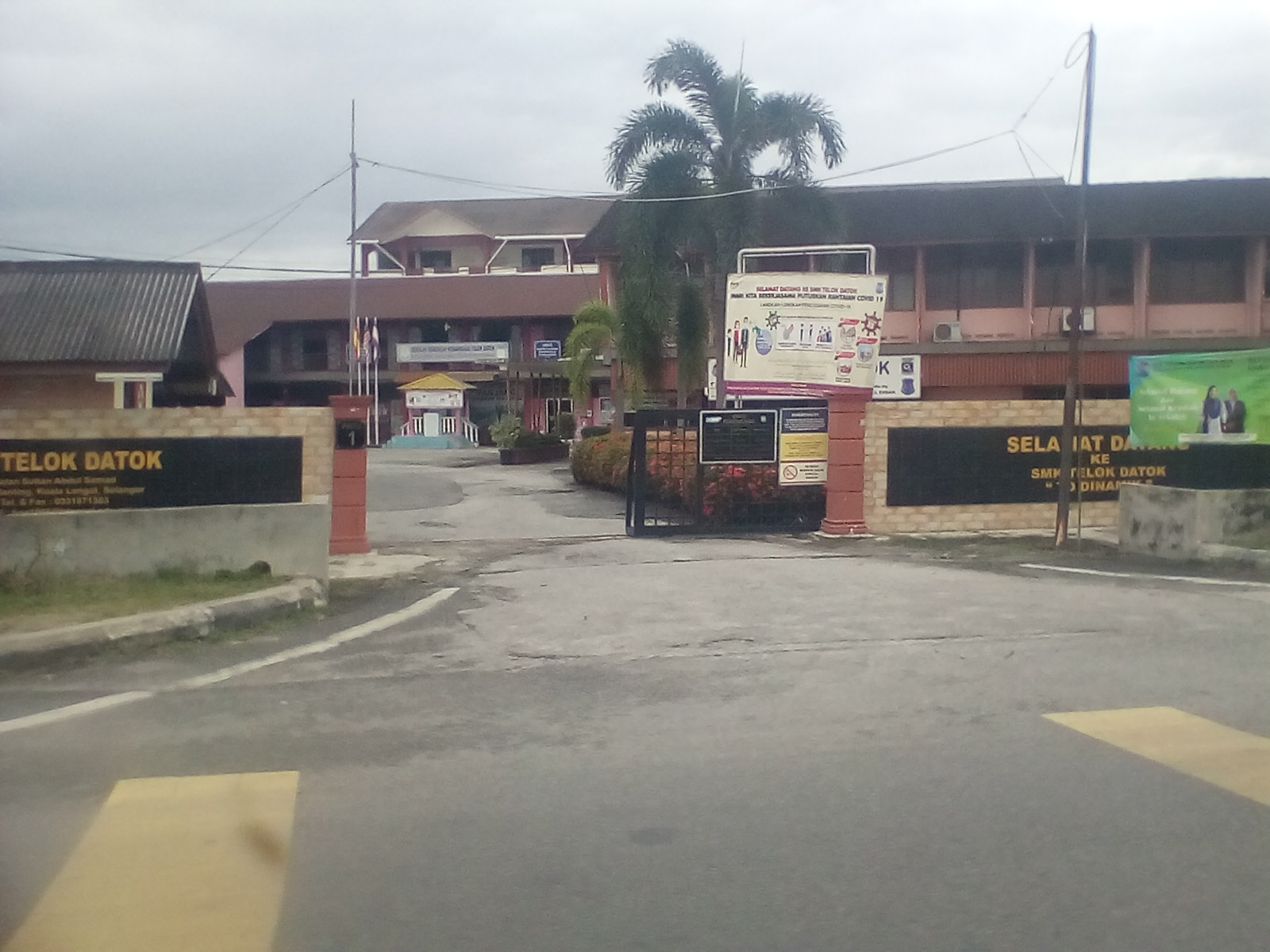
SMK Telok Datuk, Banting

- Sekolah Menengah Sains Banting
- Sekolah Agama Menengah Tinggi Tengku Ampuan Rahimah
- Sekolah Menengah Kebangsaan Telok Datok
- Sekolah Menengah Kebangsaan Sungai Manggis
- Sekolah Menengah Kebangsaan Changgang
- Sekolah Menengah Kebangsaan Banting
- Sekolah Menengah Kebangsaan Methodist
- Sekolah Menengah Kebangsaan Bandar Banting
- Sekolah Menengah Kebangsaan Jugra
- Sekolah Agama Menengah Unwanus Saadah
- Maahad Tahfiz Ihya' Al Ahmadi
- Sekolah Jenis Kebangsaan (Tamil) Telok Datok

International School :

- International Jiale Academy
- Victoria International School

Telok Panglima Garang

Primary School

SK TPG Front Gate in 2023

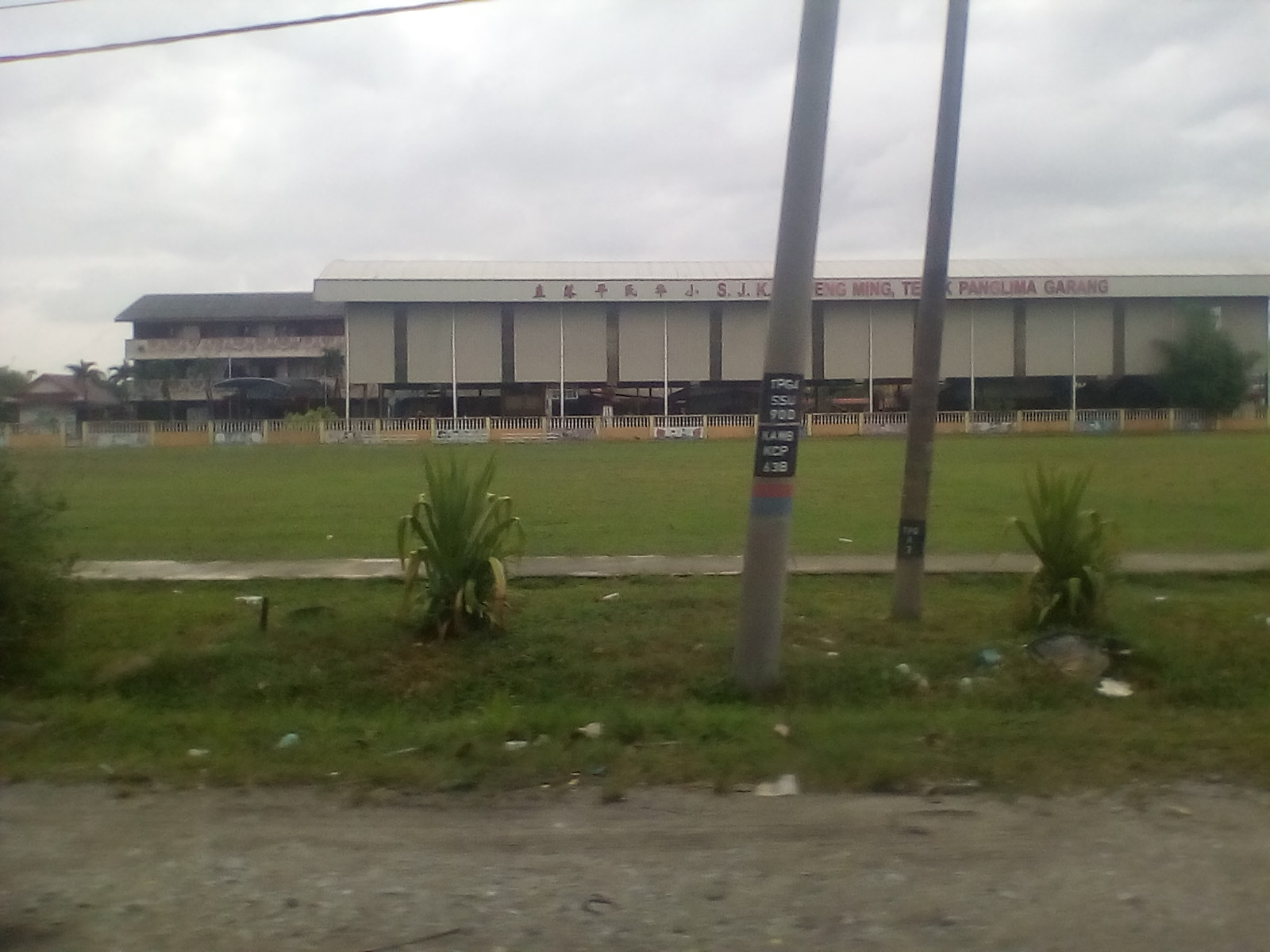
SJKC Peng Ming in 2021

- Sekolah Kebangsaan Kebun Baharu
- Sekolah Kebangsaan Telok Panglima Garang
- Sekolah Kebangsaan Kampung Medan
- Sekolah Kebangsaan Sijangkang Jaya
- Sekolah Kebangsaan Sijangkang
- Sekolah Kebangsaan Jalan Tanjung
- Sekolah Jenis Kebangsaan (Tamil) Telok Panglima Garang
- Sekolah Jenis Kebangsaan (Cina) Peng Ming
- Maahad MUR
- Sekolah Rendah Agama Kebun Baharu
- Sekolah Rendah Agama Kampung Medan

Secondary School

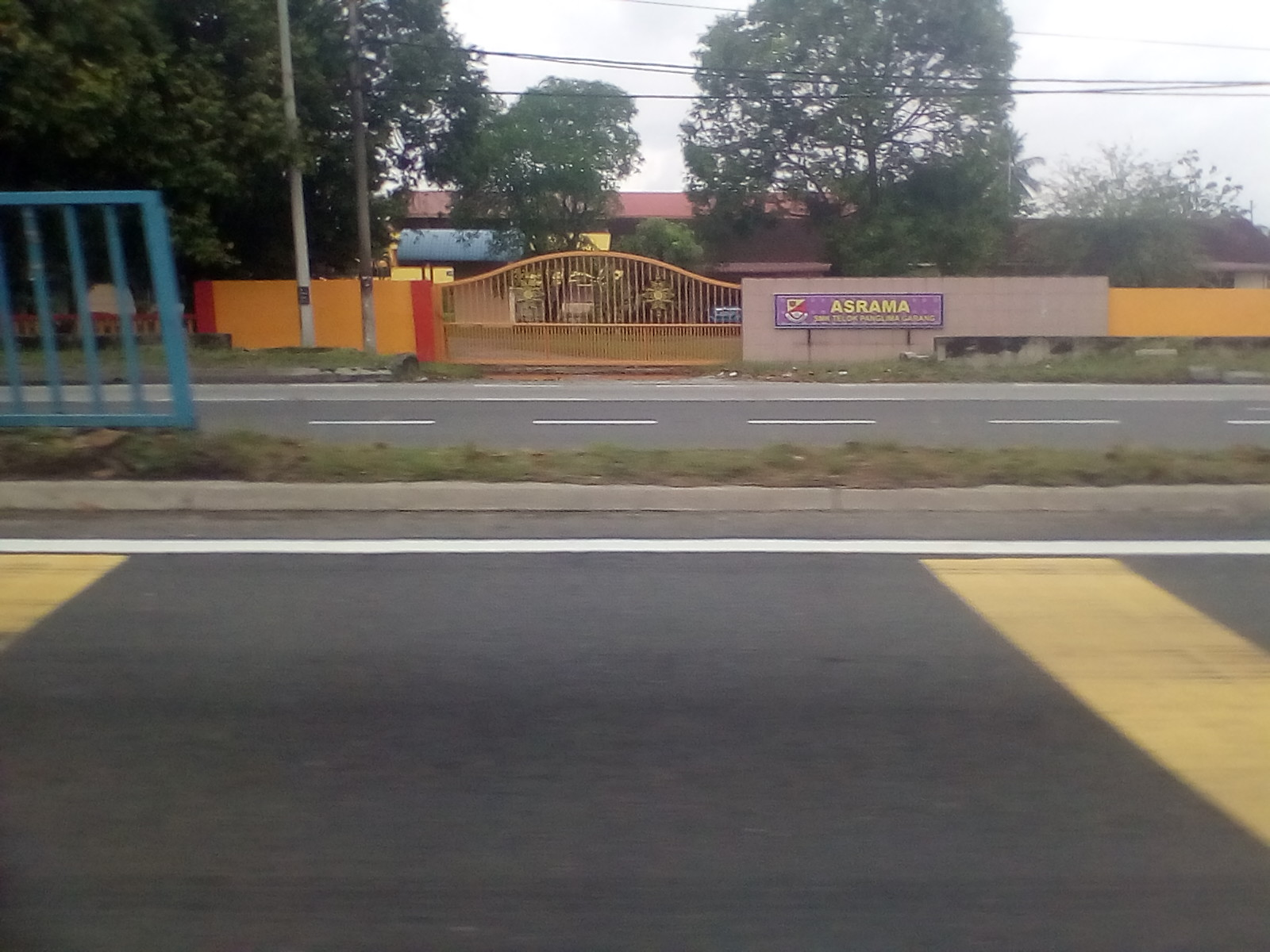
Asrama at SMKTPG

- Sekolah Menengah Kebangsaan Telok Panglima Garang
- Sekolah Menengah Kebangsaan Sijangkang Jaya
- Maahad Tahfiz Darussalim
- Maahad MUR
- Maahad Ihya' Al-Ahmadi, Sijangkang
- Sekolah Menengah Integrasi Darul Mujahidin

== See also ==
- Districts of Malaysia
