= Banting =

Town in Selangor, Malaysia

Coordinates: 2°49′N 101°30′E

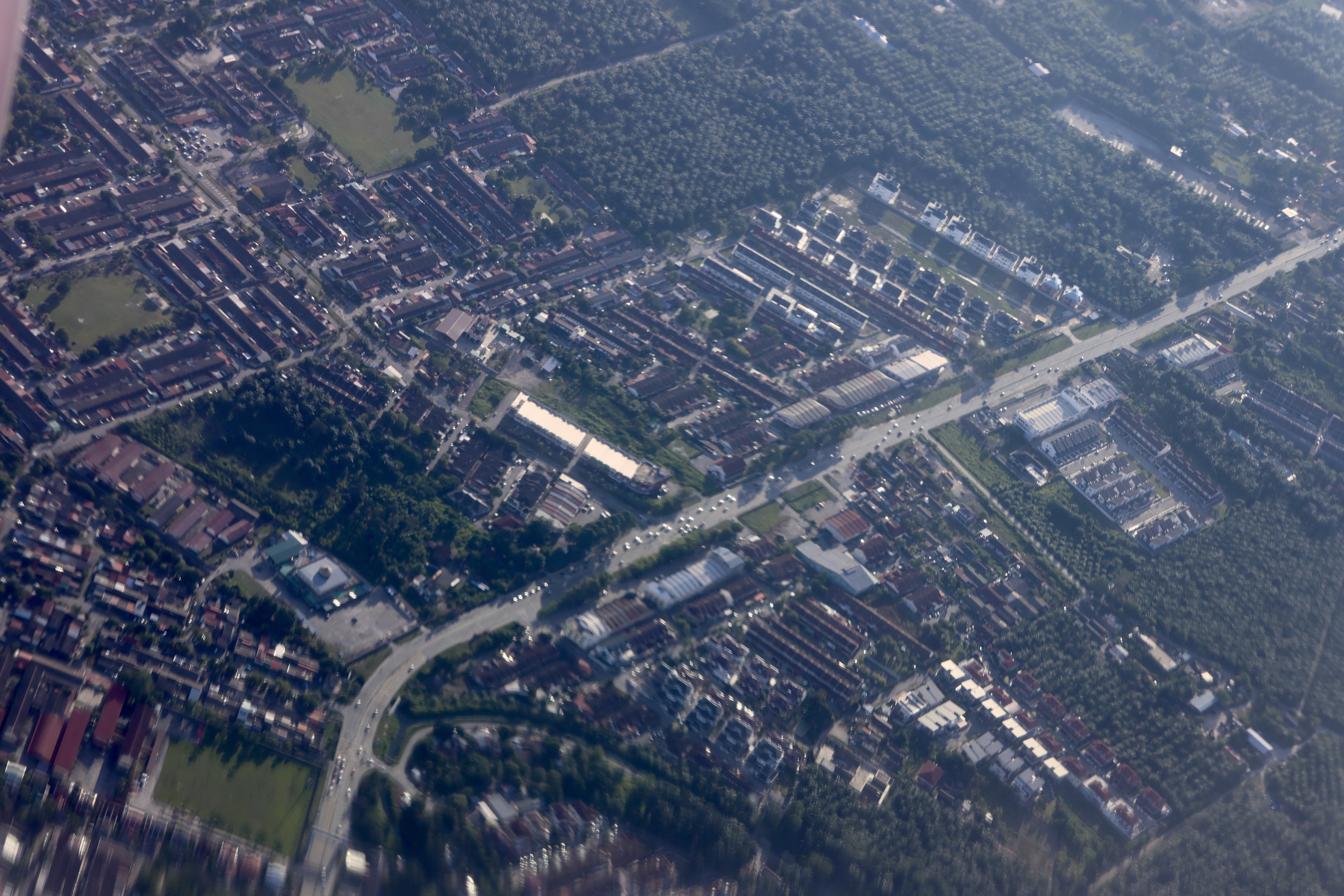
Aerial view of Banting in 2023

Banting in Kuala Langat District

Banting is a town and the seat of Kuala Langat District, Selangor, Malaysia. Banting has a population of 93,497. The postal code for Banting is 42700 and is administered by the Zone of 15 and 19 of the Kuala Langat Municipal Council. It is situated on the banks of Langat River (Sungai Langat in Malay). It is a Rest Town or Bandar Persinggahan of Federal Route 5. The historical Jugra, a former royal town of Selangor is situated near Banting. Banting is located near the beaches of Morib, as well as hills, forest and farms. Banting is an agricultural hub. Its main agricultural resources include oil palm plantations, poultry farms, betel leaves and it has a number of industrial areas. It is also the home town of the Malaysian badminton player Rashid Sidek.

== Historical places ==
Popular historical places in Banting include:

- Jugra – the former capital of Selangor before Kuala Lumpur became the state capital.
- Bandar Temasha – a former royal town of the Sultanate of Selangor and the birthplace of Sultan Salahuddin Abdul Aziz Shah.

== Schools ==
Schools, colleges and other educational institutions in Banting include:

=== Primary schools ===
- Sekolah Kebangsaan Permatang Pasir
- Sekolah Kebangsaan Bandar
- Sekolah Kebangsaan Sungai Buaya
- Sekolah Kebangsaan Pulau Carey
- Sekolah Kebangsaan Seri Lanang, Kelanang
- Sekolah Jenis Kebangsaan (C) Kah Wah
- Sekolah Kebangsaan Sri Langat (Integ)
- Sekolah Kebangsaan Kampong Busut Asli
- Sekolah Kebangsaan Jugra
- Sekolah Kebangsaan Kanchong Tengah
- Sekolah Kebangsaan Sungai Lang
- Sekolah Kebangsaan Morib
- Sekolah Jenis Kebangsaan (C) Tg Sepat
- Sekolah Kebangsaan Batu Laut
- Sekolah Kebangsaan (Asli) Bukit Cheding
- Sekolah Jenis Kebangsaan (T) Pusat Telok Datok
- Sekolah Jenis Kebangsaan (T) Sungai Sedu
- Sekolah Jenis Kebangsaan (T) Ladang Jugra
- Sekolah Jenis Kebangsaan (C) Tiong Nam
- Sekolah Kebangsaan Bukit Changgang
- Sekolah Kebangsaan Olak Lempit
- Sekolah Kebangsaan Bukit Tadom
- Sekolah Jenis Kebangsaan (C) Simpang Morib
- Sekolah Jenis Kebangsaan (C) Choong Hua
- Sekolah Kebangsaan Methodist
- Sekolah Kebangsaan Telok Panglima Garang
- Sekolah Kebangsaan Sijangkang
- Sekolah Kebangsaan Kg. Medan
- Sekolah Jenis Kebangsaan (C) Jenjarom
- Sekolah Kebangsaan Jenjarom
- Sekolah Kebangsaan Saujana Putera

== Secondary schools ==
- Sekolah Menengah Kebangsaan Banting
- Sekolah Menengah Kebangsaan Telok Datok
- Sekolah Agama Menengah Tinggi Tengku Ampuan Rahimah, Sg. Manggis (SAMTTAR)
- Sekolah Agama Menengah Unwanus Saadah, Kanchong Darat (SAMUSKD)
- Sekolah Menengah Kebangsaan Jugra
- Sekolah Menengah Kebangsaan Bandar Banting
- Sekolah Menengah Kebangsaan Jenjarom
- Sekolah Menengah Kebangsaan Telok Panglima Garang
- Sekolah Menengah Kebangsaan Batu Laut
- Sekolah Menengah Methodist
- Sekolah Menengah Kebangsaan Sungai Manggis
- Sekolah Menengah Kebangsaan Mirza Faris
- Sekolah Menengah Kebangsaan Bukit Changgang

International School:

- Victoria International School, Banting (VIS)

Fully Residential School:

- Sekolah Menengah Sains Banting

College:

- Kolej Vokasional Sultan Abdul Samad, Banting
- Kolej Komuniti Kuala Langat, Banting
- College MCS, Bandar Sg. Emas, Banting Selangor http://mcs.edu.my

Fully Residential College:

- Kolej Matrikulasi Selangor

Polytechnic

- Politeknik Banting

Other institutions

- Institut Kemahiran Belia Negara (IKBN) Kuala Langat, Banting
- Institut Latihan & Perindustrian (ILP) Banting

== Notable People from Banting or Kuala Langat District ==
- DYMM Sultan Salahuddin Abdul Aziz Shah ibni Almarhum Sultan Hisamudin Alam Syah, 11th King of Malaysia (26 April 1999 - 21 November 2001) and late Sultan Of Selangor
- Misbun Sidek, former badminton player
- Razif Sidek, former badminton player
- Jailani Sidek, former badminton player
- Rahman Sidek, former badminton player
- Rashid Sidek, former badminton player
- Thamil Arasu Ambumamee, footballer
- Zulfahmi Khairuddin, motorcycle racer

== Image gallery ==
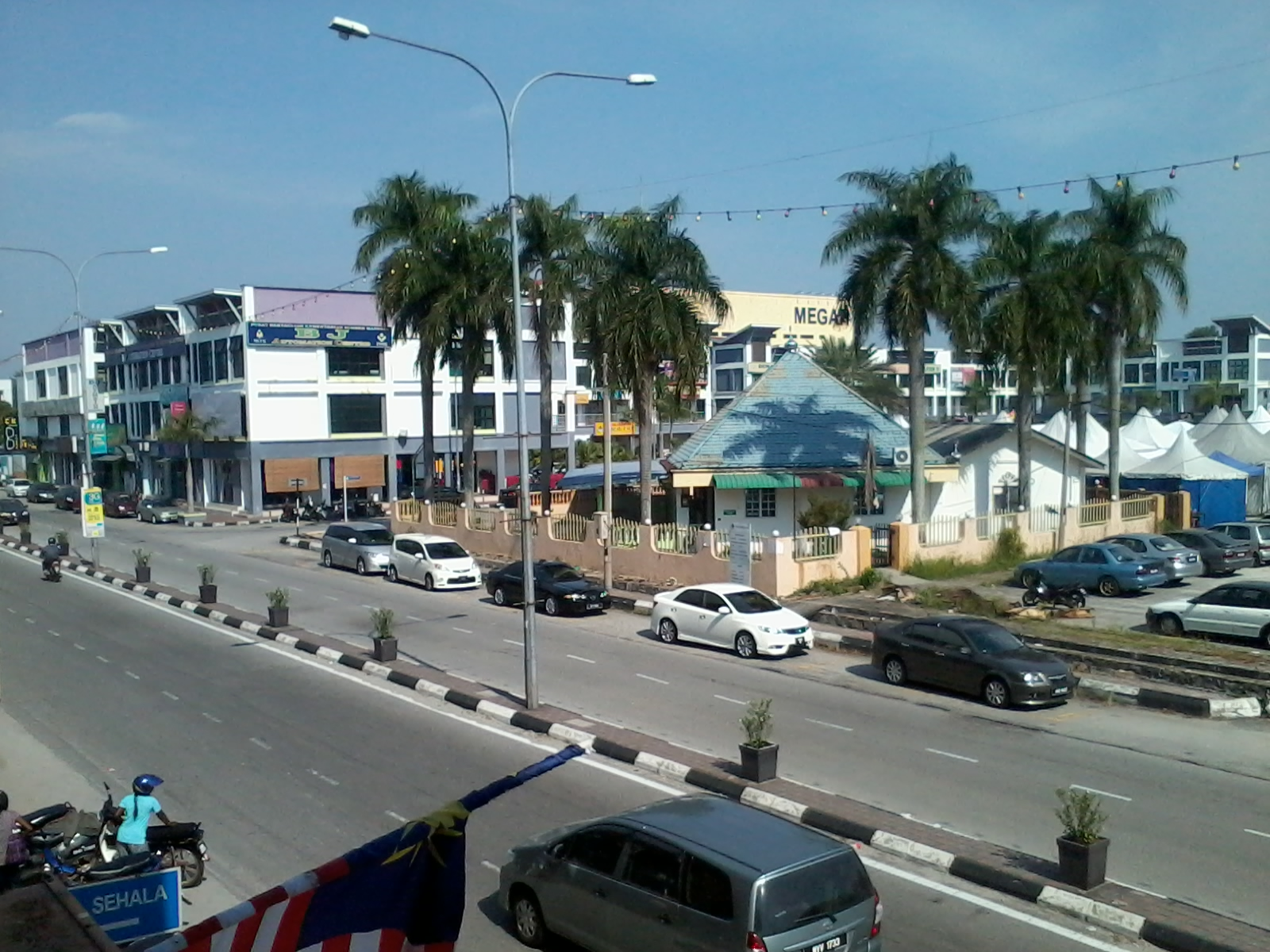
Jalan Bunga Pekan

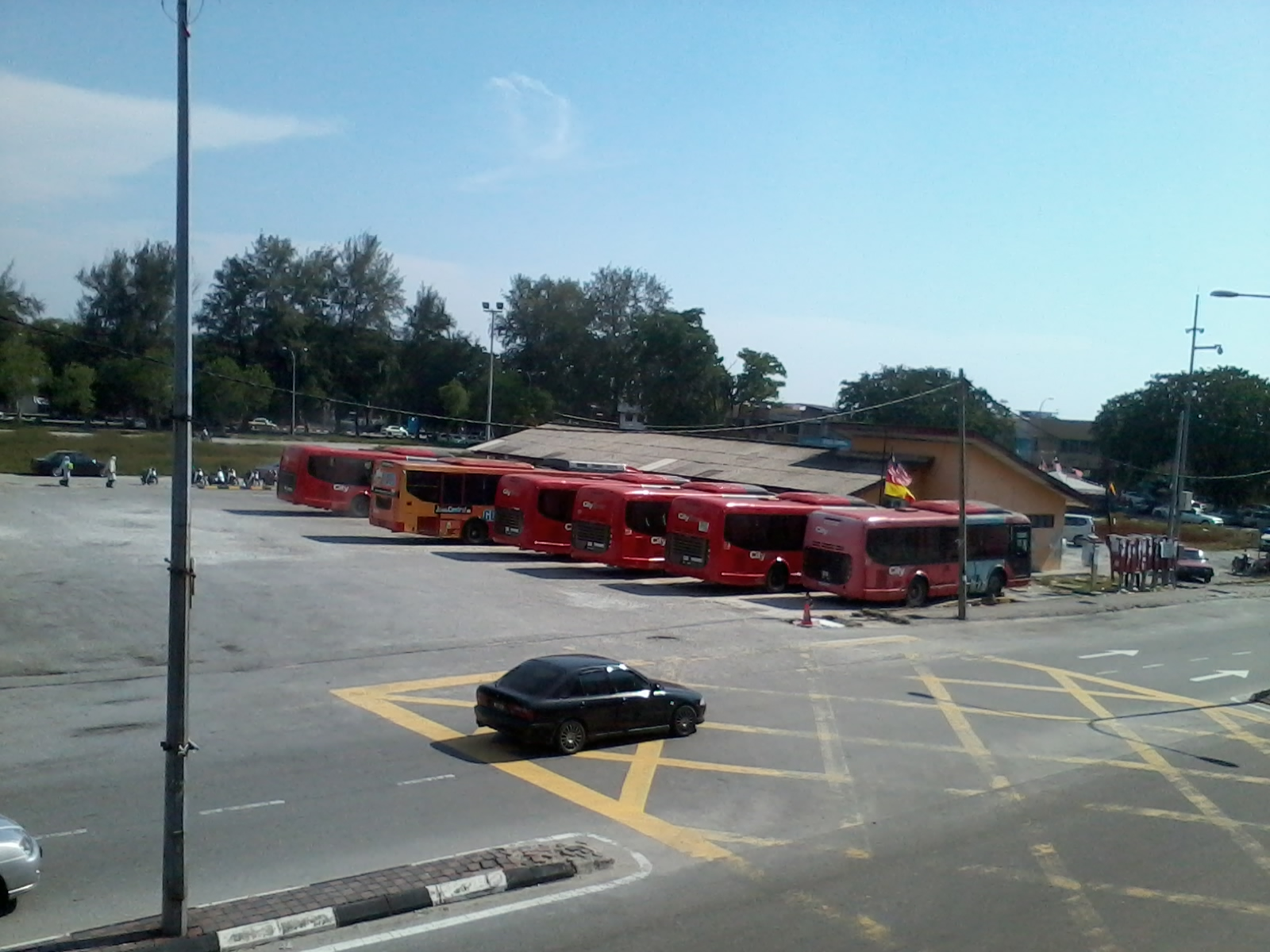
Banting Bus Station

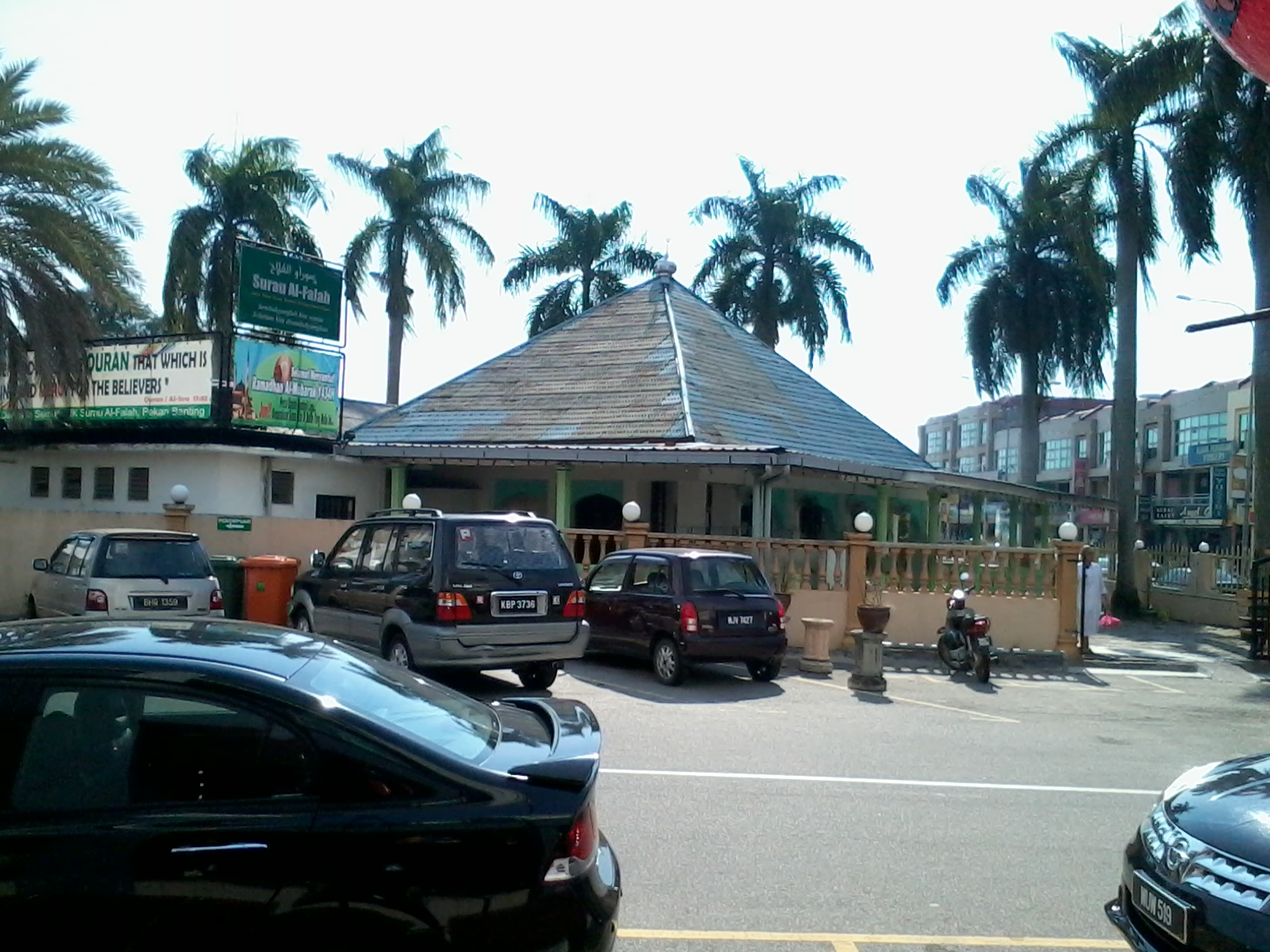
Surau Al-Falah

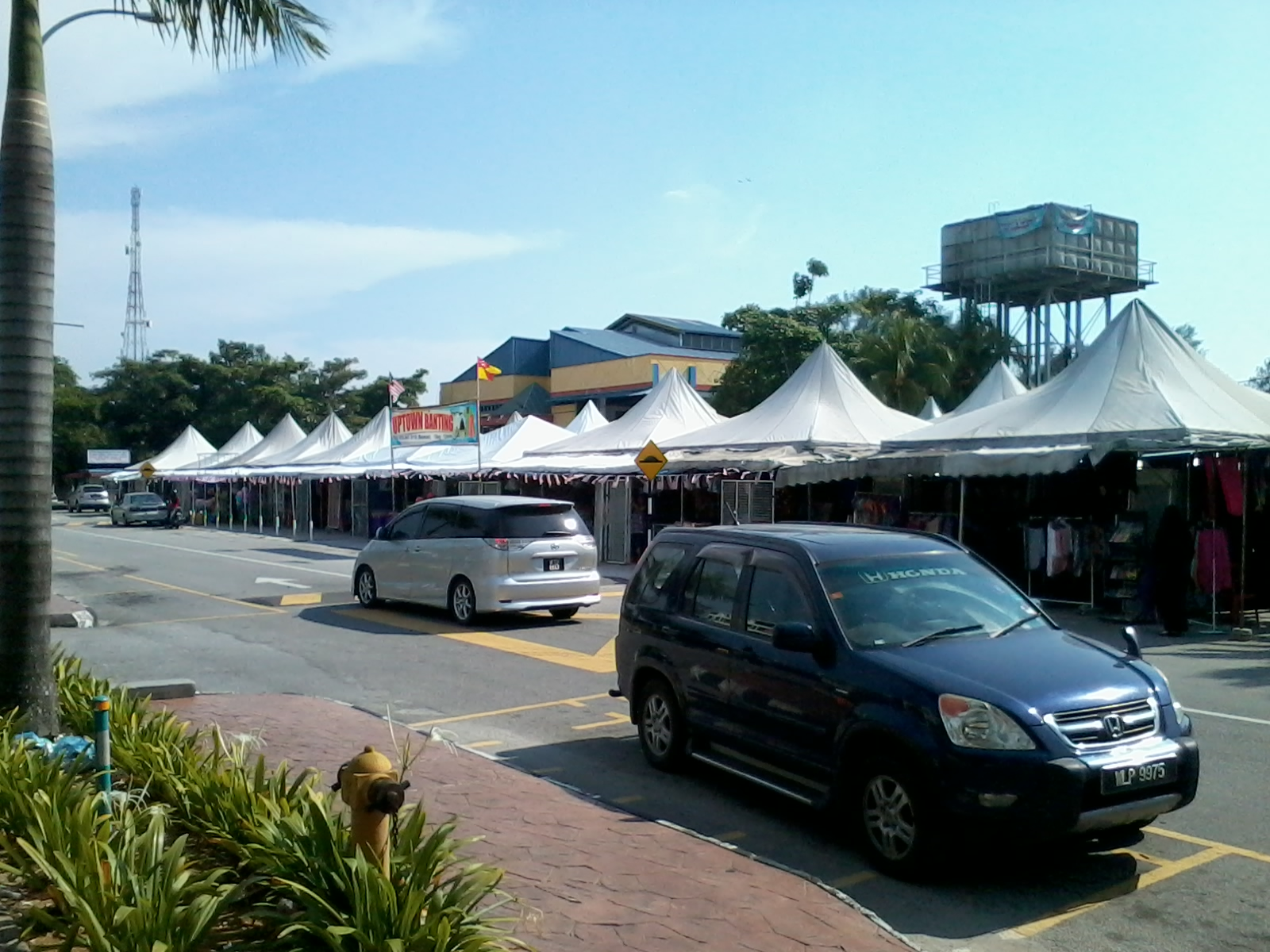
Uptown Banting

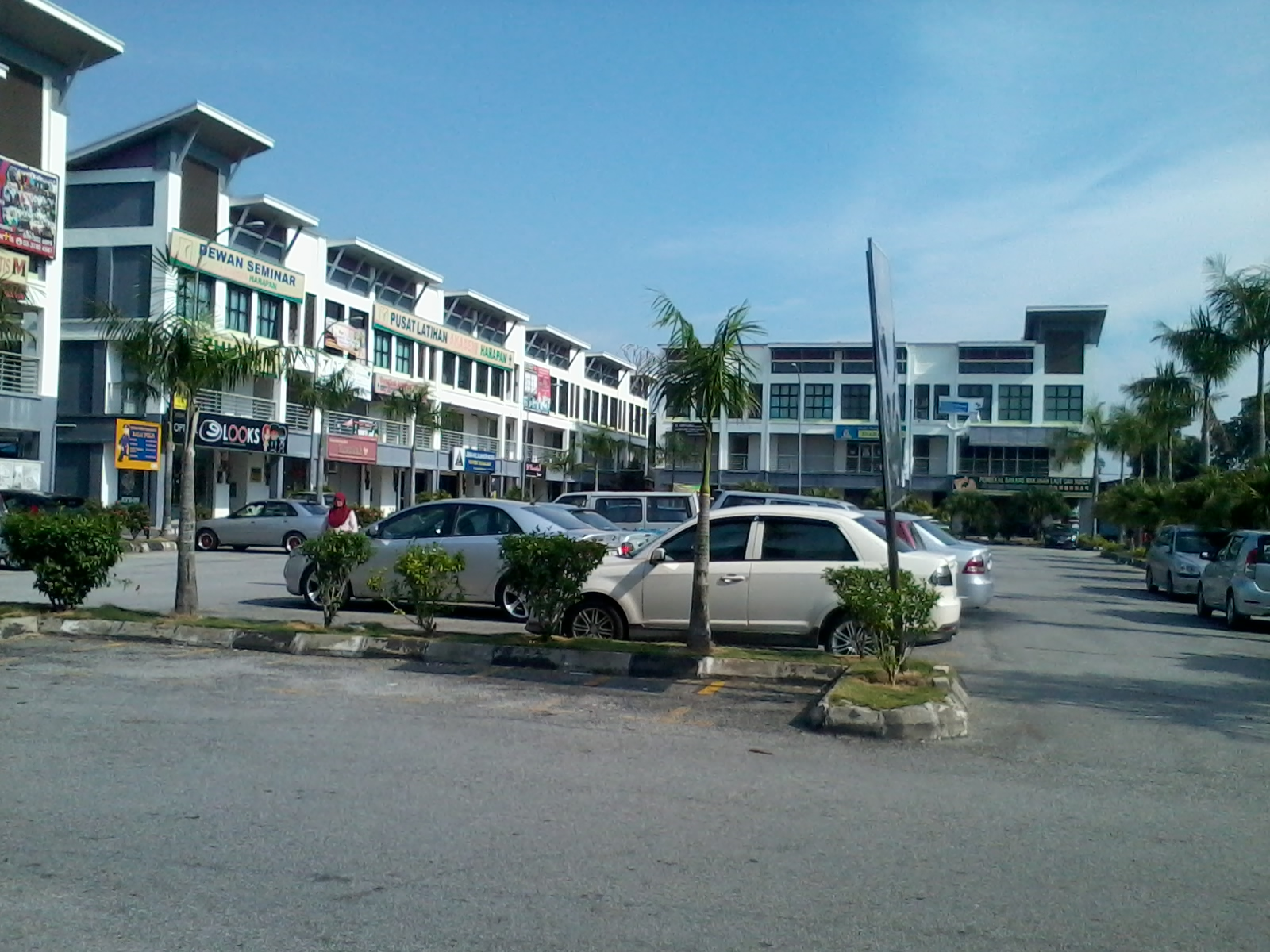

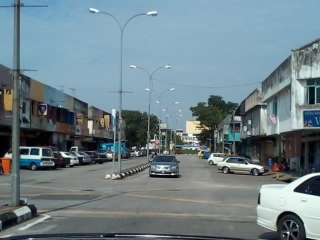
Bunga Pekan 2 street

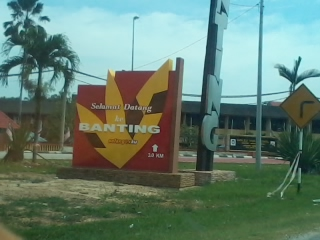
Banting welcome sign

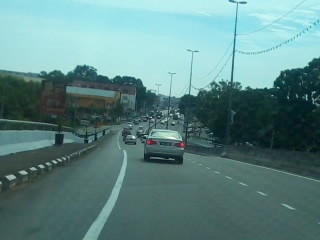
Banting from the Banting Bridge

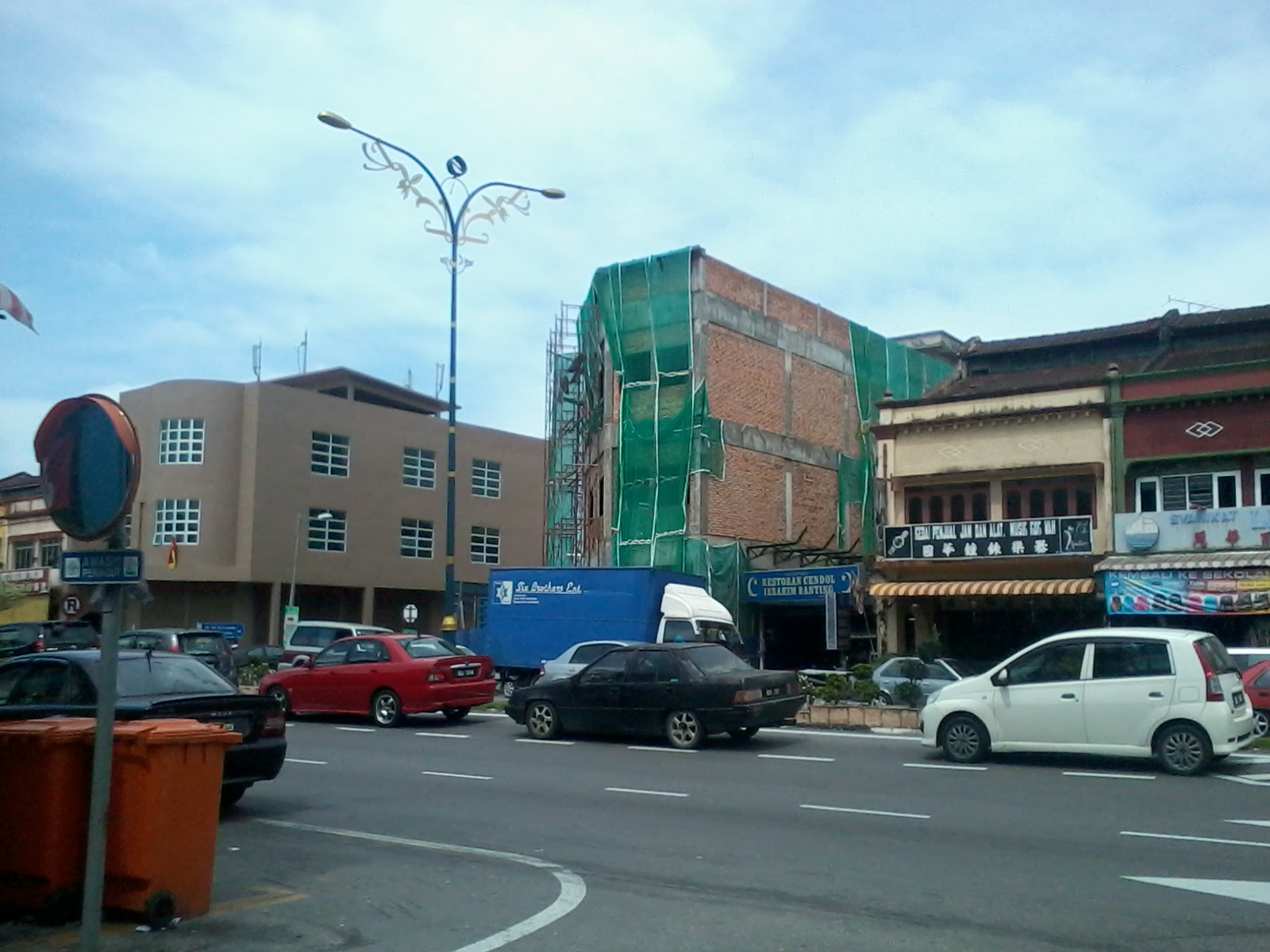
Banting in January 2014

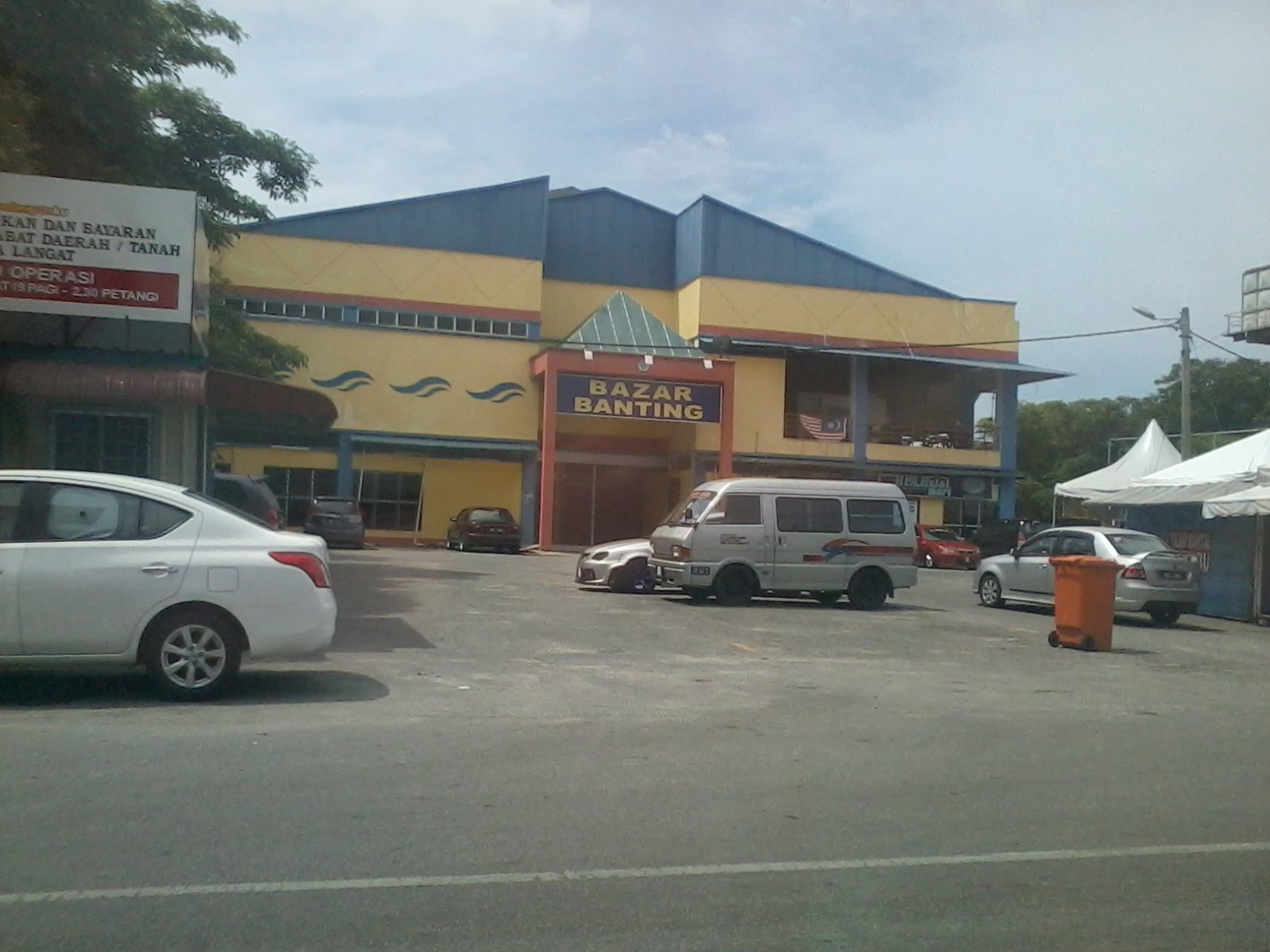
Bazar Banting

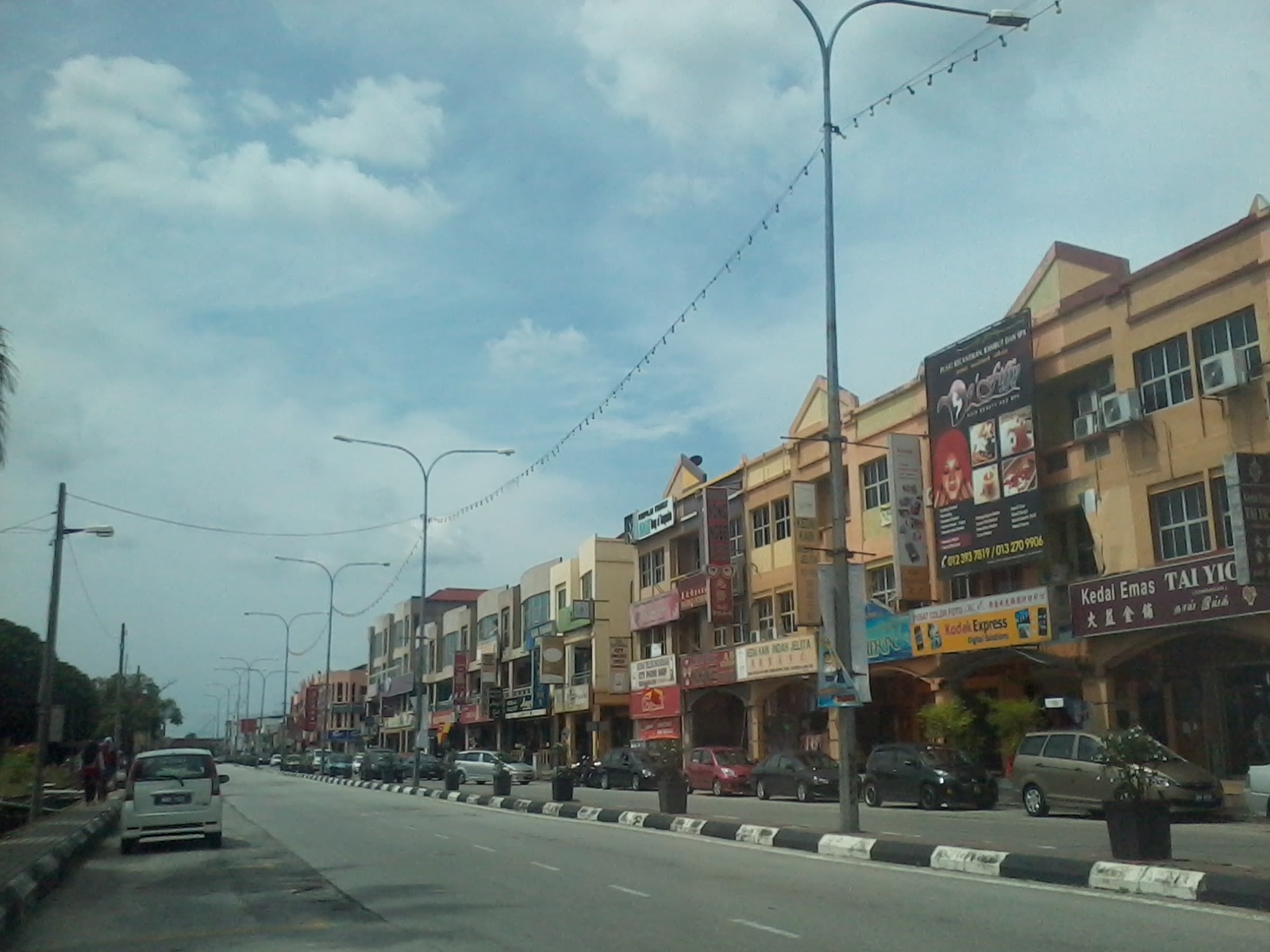
Jalan Bunga Pekan
