= List of tourist attractions in Selangor =

Tourist attractions in Selangor, Malaysia

This is the list of tourist attractions in Selangor, Malaysia.

== Galleries ==
- Sultan Abdul Aziz Royal Gallery

== Historical buildings ==
- Hatter's Castle
- One Fathom Bank Lighthouse
- Kris Monument

== Memorials ==
- Nirvana Memorial Park

== Museums ==
- Petaling Jaya Museum
- Sultan Alam Shah Museum

== Nature ==
- Ampang Recreational Forest
- Ampang River
- Ayer Hitam Forest Reserve
- Bagan Lalang Beach
- Batu Caves
- Bukit Melawati
- Carey Island
- Chiling Waterfalls
- Damansara River
- Forest Research Institute Malaysia
- Gabai Falls
- Gombak River
- Kampung Kuantan
- Kanching Waterfalls
- Ketam Island
- Klang Island
- Padang Balang
- Klang River
- Kota Damansara Community Forest Park
- Kuala Selangor Nature Park
- Langat River
- Morib Beach
- Mount Nuang
- National Botanical Garden Shah Alam
- Penchala River
- Selangor River
- Selangor State Park
- Seri Kundang Blue Lake
- Tabur Hill
- Templer's Park

== Religious places ==
=== Mosque ===
- Selangor State Mosque

=== Temple ===
- Wat Chetawan
- Fo Guang Shan Dong Zen Temple (佛光山東禪寺)
- Kau Ong Yah Lam Thian Kiong Temple (安邦南天宮)
- Batu Caves

== Sport centres ==
- Sepang International Circuit
- Shah Alam Stadium

== Shopping centres ==
- 1 Utama
- ÆON Bukit Tinggi Shopping Centre
- Empire Subang
- Jaya Supermarket
- Klang Parade
- Mines Wellness City
- Subang Parade
- Sunway Pyramid
- The Curve
- Tropicana City Mall
- Melawati Mall

== Theatres ==
- Shah Alam Royale Theatre

== Theme parks ==
- Sunway Lagoon
- WetLand
- Mines Resort City
- SplashMania Waterpark

== Towns ==
- i-City
- Sasaran
- Batu Arang
- Tanjung Sepat

== Transportation ==
- Kuala Lumpur International Airport
- Kuala Lumpur International Airport 2

== Zoo ==
- National Zoo of Malaysia

== Closed attractions ==
- Safari Lagoon Waterpark

== See also ==
- List of tourist attractions in Malaysia
