= Ilex praetermissa =

Conservation status
- Vulnerable (IUCN 2.3)

Scientific classification
- Kingdom: Plantae
- Clade: Tracheophytes
- Clade: Angiosperms
- Clade: Eudicots
- Clade: Asterids
- Order: Aquifoliales
- Family: Aquifoliaceae
- Genus: Ilex
- Species: I. praetermissa

Binomial name
- Ilex praetermissa Kiew

Species of holly

Ilex praetermissa is a species of plant in the family Aquifoliaceae. It is endemic to Klang Gates Quartz Ridge, Malaysia. It is threatened by habitat loss.
