= Selangor State Park =

Park in Malaysia

Coordinates: 3.311927°N 101.6958473°E

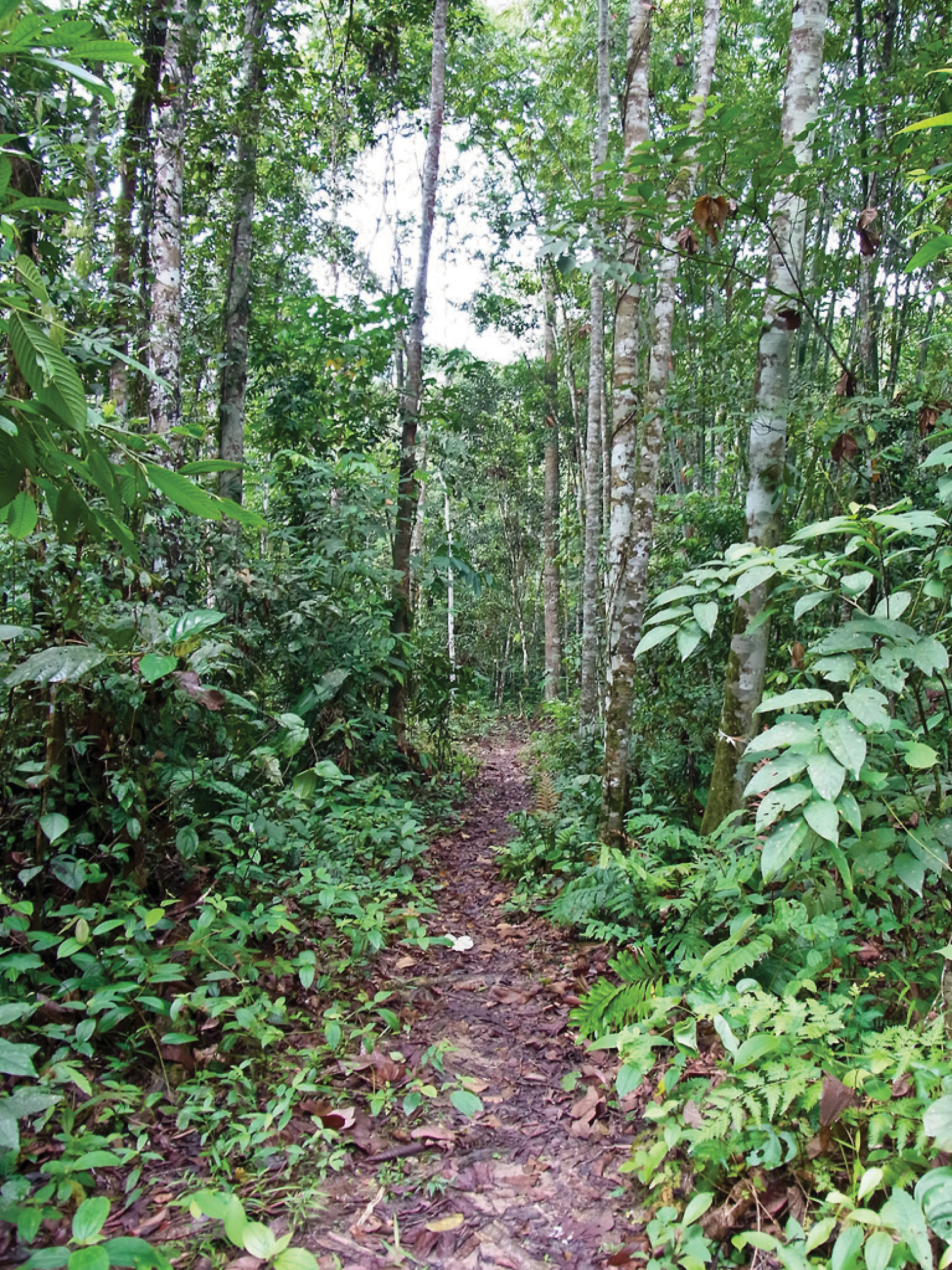
Forest near the entrance of the park.

The Selangor State Park (Malay: Taman Negeri Selangor, also known as Taman Warisan Negeri Selangor) is a park located in Gombak District, Selangor, Malaysia. The 914.41 square kilometre park was gazetted by the state on January 25, 2007. Upon its establishment, it became the second largest park in Peninsular Malaysia with the largest being the Taman Negara.

It is over 108,000 hectares in size and is the third-largest park in Peninsular Malaysia. The area was gazetted in 2007 as a state park under the National Forestry Act Enactment 2005 of Selangor and is managed by the Forestry Department of Selangor.

== Role of the Park ==
Selangor and the Federal Territories of Kuala Lumpur and Putrajaya depend on the Park for their most basic needs of clean air, water and maintenance of the local climatic stability. The Park thus helps to guarantee the quality of life enjoyed by these communities.

== Protecting Water Resource ==
The forests of Taman Negeri Selangor protect and are catchment for water contributing to the upper reaches of all major rivers in Selangor. These rivers are Sungai Bernam, Sungai Selangor, Sungai Klang and Sungai Langat. The Park area also feeds the five water-supply reservoirs that provide 98% of the water supply to Selangor, Kuala Lumpur and Putrajaya. These dams are the Sungai Selangor, Batu, Klang Gates, Langat and Semenyih dams. Ecologically, Taman Negeri Selangor helps to maintain the biodiversity in the river basins and preserve the water quality of the rivers.

== Reducing Downstream Floods ==
The forest cover of Taman Negeri Selangor provides the important ecological function of natural flood mitigation for Selangor, Kuala Lumpur and Putrajaya. The forests absorb moisture through plant roots and sponge up large quantities of rainfall in their organically enriched soil system. Thus, the Park serves in water catchment and also as a natural buffer against flooding that is typically most felt in settlements and population centres farther downstream. The natural forest also helps to reduce soil erosion and sedimentation of the reservoirs.

== Protecting Steep Slopes ==
The majority of the State Park is highland over 300 meters above sea level, with steep slopes greater than 25 degrees. This environmentally sensitive area is particularly vulnerable to soil erosion and landslides. The thick forest, together with the leaf litter and other organic debris, help reduce the direct impact of rain on the soil. The extensive root systems of natural vegetation hold the soil in place.

== A Centre for Eco-tourism, Research and Education ==
The Park area provides many recreational opportunities, and it also caters to valuable educational and research activities. As one of the most accessible forest areas in Malaysia, the Park provides an invaluable retreat from the pressures of modern urban lifestyles (e.g. at Ampang Recreational Forest). The Park attracts activities of two major international research centres existing within or near its area, the University of Malaya Field Studies Centre in Hulu Gombak with its incredible forested backdrop, and the Forest Research Institute of Malaysia (FRIM) in Kepong.

== Biodiversity ==
The Park area, rich in fauna and flora, is significant in maintaining existing levels of biodiversity resources. The wealth of the biodiversity of the Park also contributes to Malaysia's classification as one of the mega-biodiversity countries in the world. Documented within the Park are:

- much of some 3140 vascular plant species recorded for Selangor are now conserved
- 114 mammal species have been documented
- 355 bird species can be found
- 104 freshwater fish species have been recorded
- 202 reptilian and amphibian species occur

== The Klang Gates Quartz Ridge ==
Resembling the back of a dragon, the Klang Gates Quartz Ridge is a world-class geological wonder and a key feature of the Selangor State Park. Made up entirely of white milky quartz, it is one of the longest quartz outcrops of its kind in the world, measuring about 14 km long above ground and up to 50 m wide at certain sections. This Ridge can be classified as a geotope, having outstanding geological value. The Ridge is estimated to be 170 million years old. It is located just outside the north-eastern part of Kuala Lumpur, stretching from Taman Seri Gombak to Kampung Kemensah. The Klang Gates Dam was built at a small natural opening (gap) separating the two main stretches of the Ridge, namely Bukit Batu Tabor in the west and Bukit Chondong in the east.

== Pressures on the Park ==
The current alignment of the KL Outer Ring Road (KLORR) will have a tremendous impact on the Park, as the alignment of the highway is proposed to cut through to sections of the Park - the Klang Gates Quartz Ridge and the Ampang Forest Reserve. Some residents, community groups and NGOs have spoken out for the need to find a better solution to the KLORR.

== See also ==
- Geography of Malaysia
