= Salleh Mohd Nor =

Malaysian forester and conservationist

- Born: 20 October 1940 (age 85); Kuala Pilah (town)
- Education: Adelaide University
- Scientific career
- Fields: Forestry
- Workplaces: Forest Research Institute Malaysia

YBhg Tan Sri Dato’Salleh bin Haji Mohd Nor (born 20 October 1940, in Kuala Pilah (town), Negeri Sembilan) is a Malaysian forester, conservationist and academician. Salleh was the first director-general of the Forest Institute of Malaysia (FRIM) and served as president of the Malaysian Nature Society (MNS) for 30 years.

== Education ==
Tan Sri Dr Salleh received the Colombo Plan Scholarship to study forestry in Adelaide from 1961-1962, and later at the Australian Forestry School (AFS), Canberra, from which he graduated with a BSc (Forestry) from Adelaide University and a Diploma of Forestry from AFS. Salleh received his Ph.D. and Masters Degree from Michigan State University.

== Honours and awards ==
Salleh was the 2016 recipient of the Merdeka Award in the 'Environment' category. He has received the following honours:

- Malaysia
  - Commander of the Order of the Defender of the Realm (PMN) - Tan Sri

== Public office ==
Salleh chaired the Malaysian Antarctic Programme and has visited Antarctica twice. He has served as the Pro-Chancellor of Universiti Teknologi Malaysia. He was elected president of the International Union of Forest Research Organizations (IUFRO). He was a member of the Malaysian Human Rights Commission (SUHAKAM), chairman of Universiti Malaysia Terengganu (UMT), chairman of Malaysian Bio-Industry Organization (MBIO), and secretary-general of the Academy of Sciences Malaysia (ASM). He is a fellow of the Malaysian Scientific Association.

== Conservation work ==
As president of MNS, and subsequently as senior advisor of the society, Salleh has been active in campaigns to save several forests in Malaysia. Successful campaigns have led to the protection of Endau-Rompin National Park, Royal Belum State Park, Kota Damansara Community Forest Park, Bukit Kiara park and numerous other sites of high value for biodiversity.
