= Gladys Le Mare =

British zoologist

- Born: Gladys Keay; 29 December 1912
- Died: 28 June 1967 (aged 54)
- Education: St Hugh's College, Oxford

Gladys Le Mare (née Keay; 1912–1967) was a British zoologist and a founder of the Malaysian Nature Society.

== Early life and education ==
Le Mare was born on 29 December 1912, the second of three daughters of Richard and Frances Ann Keay. She attended Hanley High School and graduated from St Hugh's College Oxford in 1934 with first class honours in zoology. She taught biology at Westcliff High School for Girls and St. Anne's College, Natal, in South Africa, before leaving for Singapore in 1939 to marry Deryck Watts Le Mare (1912-1967), then Asst Director of Fisheries, Straits Settlements.

== Malaysian work ==
In 1940, Le Mare became one of the founders of the Malaysian Nature Society and the founding editor of the Malayan Nature Journal. During World War II, she worked in a military hospital in Singapore, leaving the city ten days before the Fall of Singapore, and reaching England by May 1942. The Malayan Nature Journal resumed publication in 1947, with Le Mare continuing as editor. In 1950 she became supervisor of the blood transfusion unit of the General Hospital in Penang. She returned to England in about 1956.

== Research ==
Le Mare, publishing as Keay, was known for her work on mites.

== Selected publications ==
- Elton, Charles; Keay, Gladys (1936). "The seasonal occurrence of harvest mites (Trombicula autumnalis Shaw) on voles and mice near Oxford". Parasitology. 28: 110–114. doi:10.1017/S0031182000022307.
- Keay, Gladys (1937). "The Ecology of the Harvest Mite (Trombicula autumnalis) in the British Isles". Journal of Animal Ecology. 6 (1): 23–35. Bibcode:1937JAnEc...6...23K. doi:10.2307/1056. ISSN 0021-8790. JSTOR 1056.
