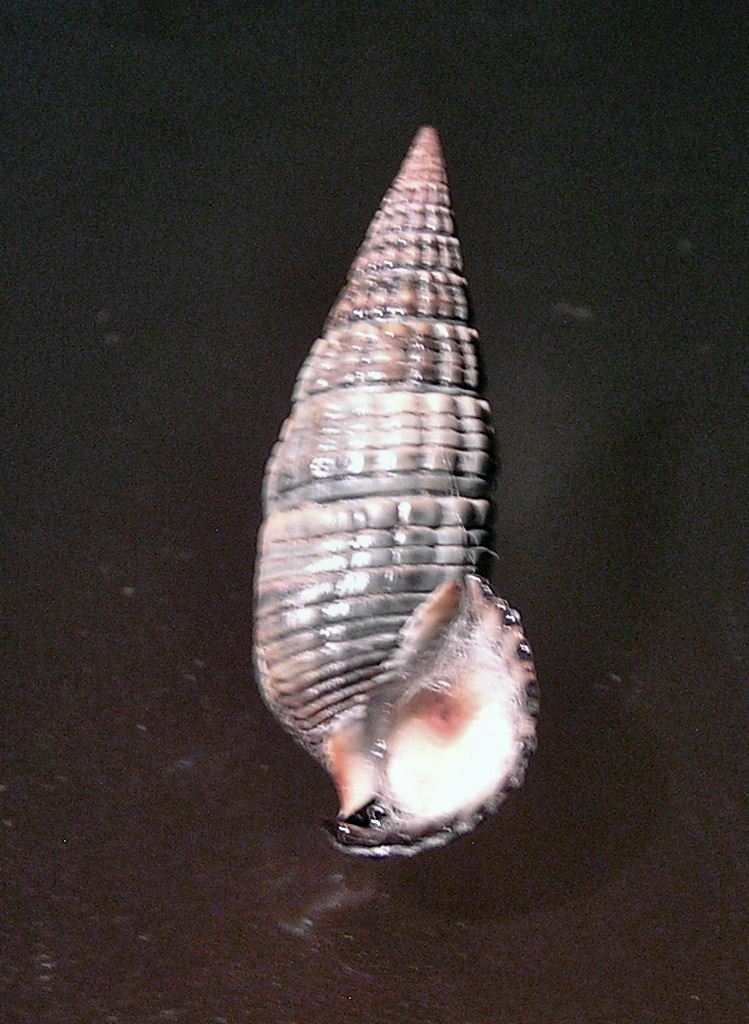

Scientific classification
- Kingdom: Animalia
- Phylum: Mollusca
- Class: Gastropoda
- Subclass: Caenogastropoda
- Order: incertae sedis
- Family: Potamididae
- Genus: Terebralia
- Species: T. semistriata

Binomial name
- Terebralia semistriata (Mörch, 1852)

Synonyms
- Cerithium semistriatum Mörch, O.A.L. 1852; Cerithium semitrisulcatum Sowerby, G.B. 1855; Potamides (Terebralia) semitrisulcatus (Mörch, 1852).; Pyrazus semitrisulcatum (Sowerby G.B., 1855).; Strombus semistriatus Röding, 1798

= Terebralia semistriata =

Species of gastropod

Terebralia semistriata, common name the striate mud creeper, is a species of sea snail, a marine gastropod mollusk in the family Potamididae.

== Description ==
The length of the shell varies between 35 mm and 75 mm.

== Distribution ==
This marine species occurs also in intertidal flats, mangroves, mud-silt off Papua New Guinea and Australia (Northern Territory, Queensland, Western Australia).

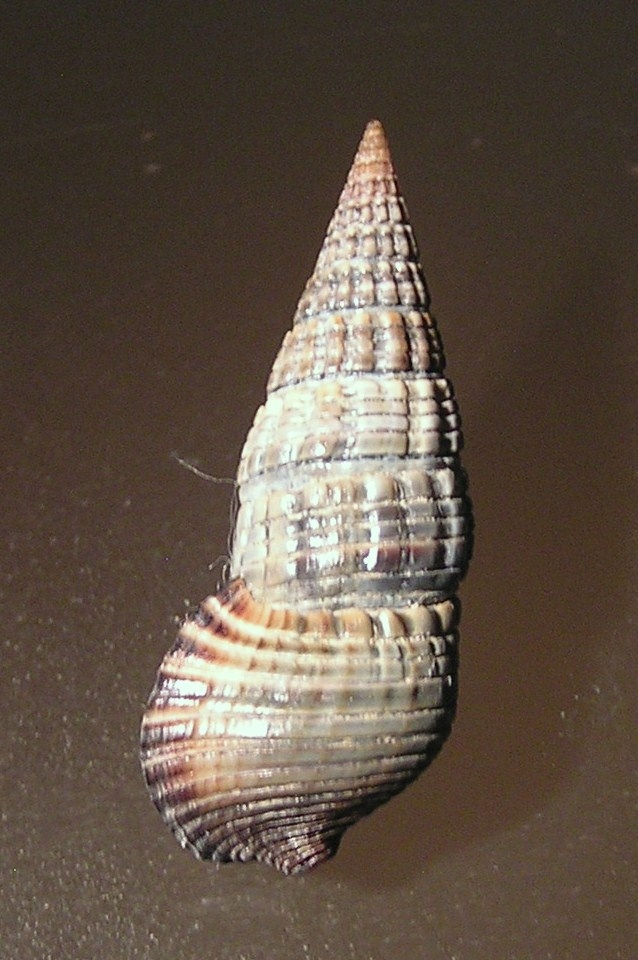
Terebralia semistriata
