= Federal Hill, Kuala Lumpur =

Coordinates: 3.139423°N 101.678819°E

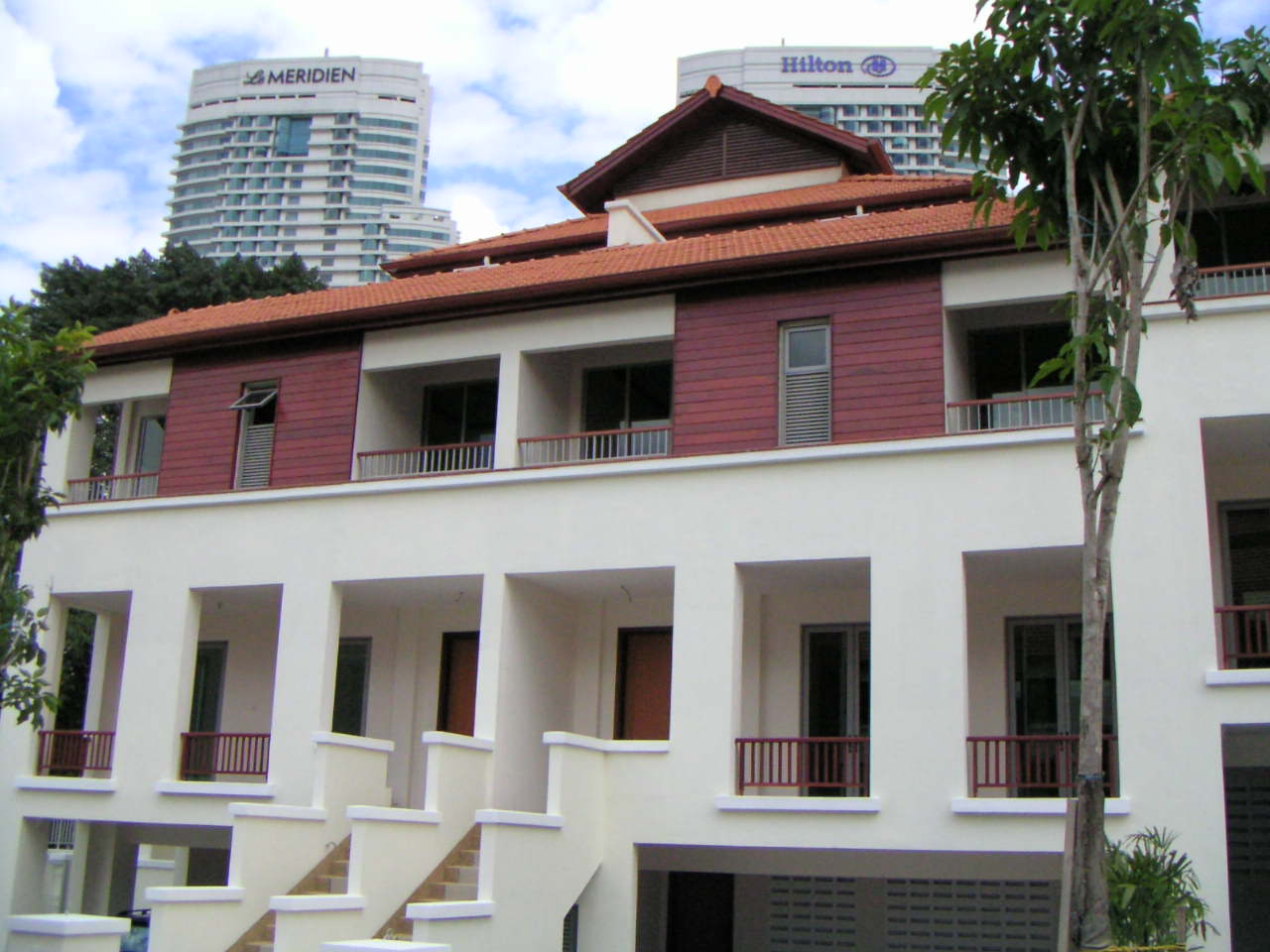
A house in Federal Hill, Kuala Lumpur

Federal Hill (Malay: Bukit Persekutuan) is a low-density and affluent residential area in Kuala Lumpur, Malaysia. This residential area was developed during the British colonial era.

Federal Hill is covered by an 18-acre (0.073 km^{2}) secondary forest. It is bordered by Lebuhraya Sultan Iskanda to the northeast, Jalan Travers to the southeast and Jalan Maarof to the southwest. KL Sentral is located across Jalan Bangsar. The Lake Gardens is situated adjacent to Federal Hill.

== History ==
Federal Hill was formerly a swampy land. In 1896, rubber estates were established and were mostly privately owned by European government servants. Today, some remnants of rubber trees can still be found here.

Among the earliest government buildings placed here is the Bangsar Hospital (European Hospital) which was built in the early 1900s. It is now developed as the Health Institute or Institut Pengurusan Kesihatan. The most significant building is the Galeri Sri Perdana, which was formerly the Prime Minister's official residence.

== Current land status ==
The land is owned by the private foundation DSBL. The administration and maintenance of the buildings and surroundings is carried out by Kuala Lumpur City Hall.

== Architecture ==
There are 113 old government bungalows with gardens built during the 1950s. The oldest existing building is the Malaysian Nature Society headquarters which can be seen on a 1929 map. There are four palaces at the hill belonging to the Johor, Kedah, Perak and Negeri Sembilan households.

== Nature’s wealth ==
The flora and fauna in the hill includes more than 65 species of local and migratory birds, long tailed macaques, tree shrews and monitor lizards. Plenty of mature forest trees are scattered along the hill slopes and gullies including big timber trees like tembusu, nyatoh tembaga, jelutong and pulai.
