= Sultan Abdul Aziz Royal Gallery =

Gallery in Klang, Selangor, Malaysia

- Galeri Diraja Sultan Abdul Aziz
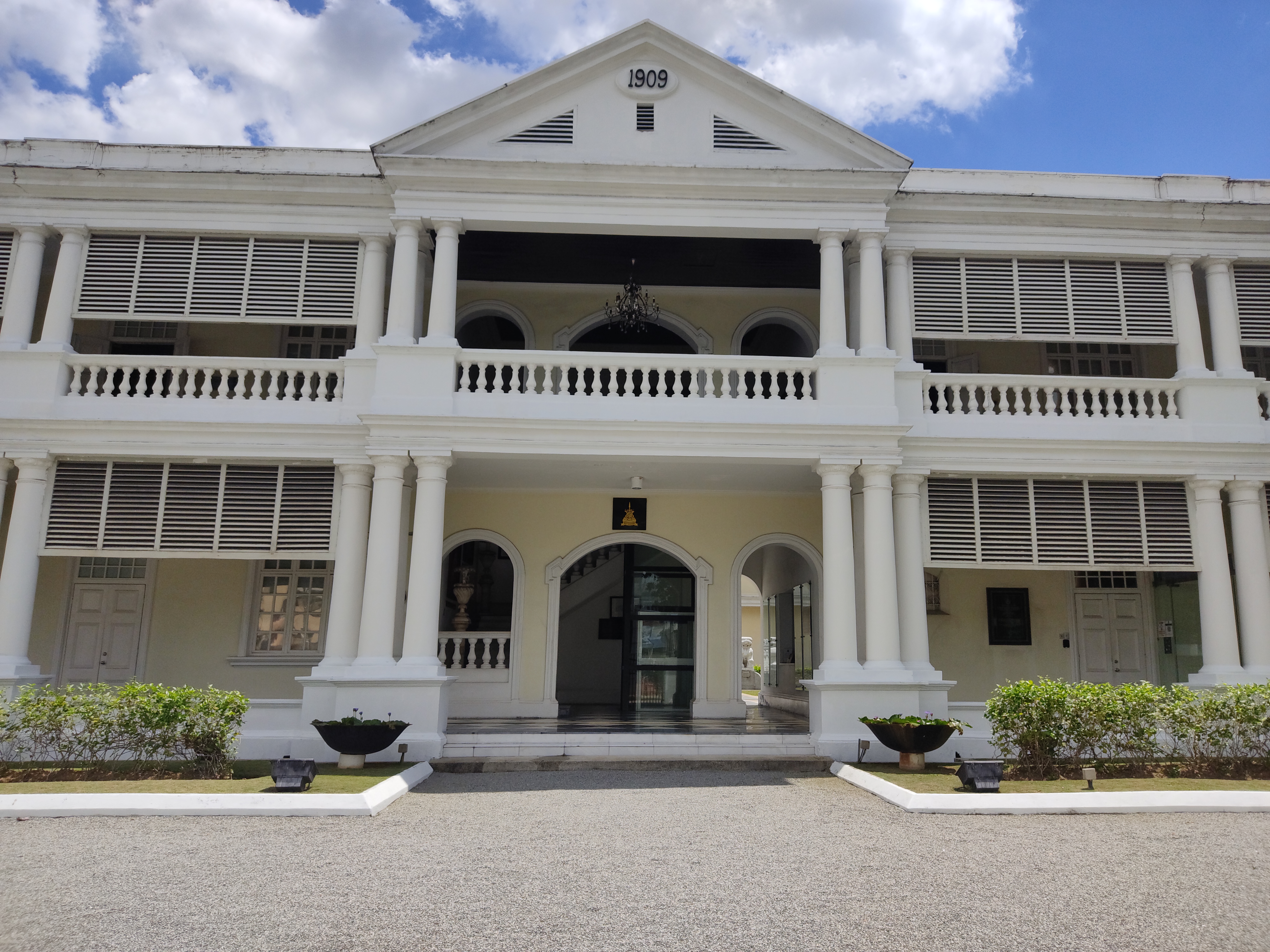
- Established: 1988 (as Memorial Museum); 19 October 2007 (as Sultan Abdul Aziz Royal Gallery)
- Location: Klang District, Selangor, Malaysia
- Coordinates: 3°2′28.7″N 101°26′57.1″E
- Type: gallery
- Architect: Arthur Benison Hubback
- Owner: Sultan of Selangor
- Website: www.galeridiraja.com

The Sultan Abdul Aziz Royal Gallery (Malay: Galeri Diraja Sultan Abdul Aziz) is a gallery about the former Selangor Sultan Salahuddin Abdul Aziz Shah in Klang District, Selangor, Malaysia. The Royal Gallery is currently chaired by then nephew of Salahuddin of Selangor, Tengku Indera Pahlawan Diraja Selangor (Yang Amat Dihormati Tengku Dato' Setia Putra Alhaj bin Tengku Azman Shah Alhaj).

== History ==
The museum building was initially constructed in 1909 as Sultan Sulaeman Building. During British Malaya, the British government used the building as land and administration office. During the Japanese rule of Malaya, it was used as war headquarters. After the independence of Malaya in 1957, it was used as Klang District Office. The museum was initially opened in 1988 as the Memorial Museum (Malay: Muzium Kenangan). It was then transformed into Sultan Abdul Aziz Royal Gallery and was officiated by Sultan Sharafuddin on 19 October 2007.

== Architecture ==
The museum is housed in a two-story building which was designed by British architect Arthur Benison Hubback.

== Exhibitions ==
The gallery displays the history and heritage of Sultanate of Selangor since 1766 from more than 2,000 artifacts.

== Transportation ==
The gallery is accessible within walking distance south of Klang Komuter station.

== See also ==
- List of tourist attractions in Selangor
- Sultan of Selangor
