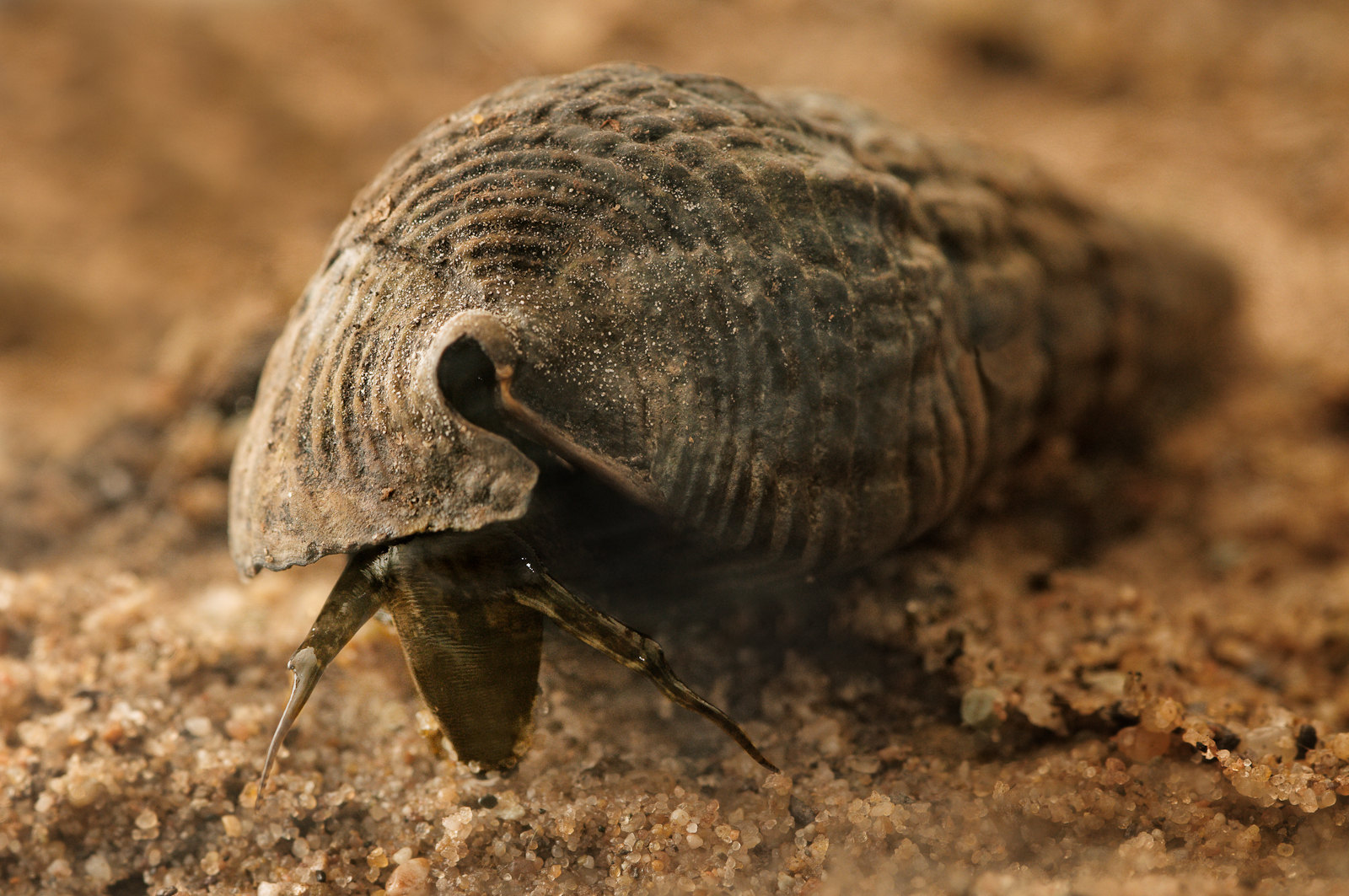
- Terebralia palustris

Scientific classification
- Kingdom: Animalia
- Phylum: Mollusca
- Class: Gastropoda
- Subclass: Caenogastropoda
- Order: incertae sedis
- Superfamily: Cerithioidea
- Family: Potamididae
- Genus: Terebralia; Swainson, 1840

Synonyms
- † Terebralia (Gravesicerithium) Charpiat, 1923 alternate representation

= Terebralia =

Genus of gastropods

Terebralia is a genus of sea snails, marine gastropod mollusks in the family Potamididae.

== Species ==
Species within the genus Terebralia include:

- Terebralia palustris (Linnaeus, 1767)
- Terebralia semistriata (Mörch, 1852)
- Terebralia sulcata (Born, 1778)
