= Kota Damansara Community Forest Park =

Forest in Selangor, Malaysia

Coordinates: 3.17861°N 101.591327°E

Artificial lake at the park.

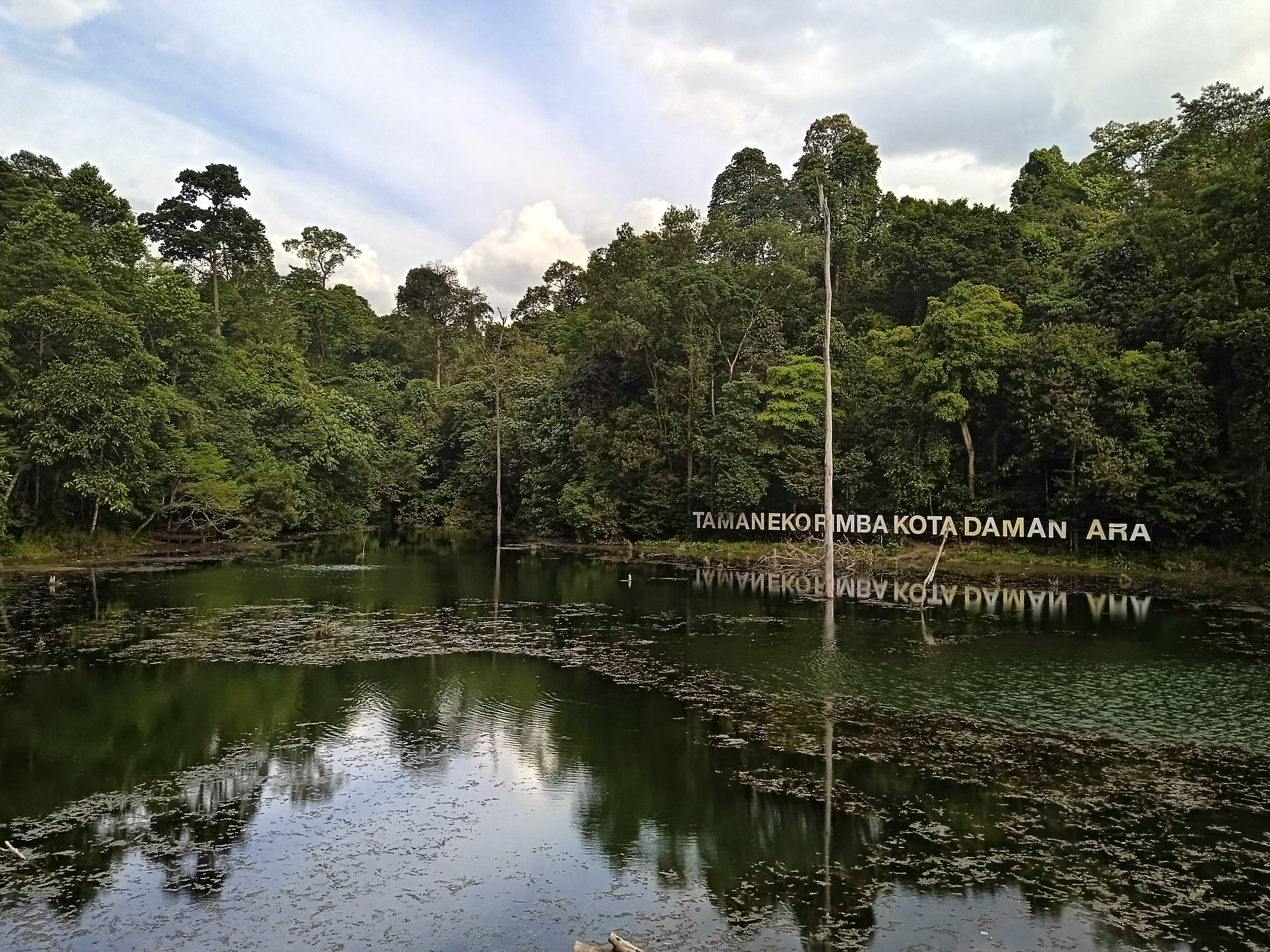
Kota Damansara Community Forest Park

The Kota Damansara Community Forest Park (KDCFP) is a secondary forest located in Selangor, Malaysia. It was part of a defunct Sungai Buloh Forest Reserve gazetted in 1898 which contained 3,900 acres (16 km^{2}) of protected primary forest. This made it as the oldest forest reserve in Peninsular Malaysia. The forest reserve was degazetted a number of times and subsequent development brought down the size of the reserve to a 857-acre (3.5 km^{2}).

Logging activities especially has turned the area into a secondary forest. This results in the abundance of pioneer plants as well as rare species of plant such as Begonia aequilateralis. Despite being a secondary forest, a number of primary forest species such as meranti are observable at the park. Furthermore, KDCFP is a dipterocarp forest typically found in tropical countries such as Malaysia. The area is a combination of flat land and low elevation hill.

The trademark of KDCFP is an artificial lake. The lake was created in early 2000s due to the building of a road that blocked a small stream that flows through the park. This has introduced aquatic flora and fauna attributable to slow-flowing water body to the area.

== Current development ==
Kota Damansara is a developing area and there are efforts to develop the area. The local residents and the Malaysian Nature Society with aid from the United Nations Development Program through the Small Grants Program are trying to protect the area from further development projects.

== See also ==
- Geography of Malaysia
