= Kota Damansara =

Coordinates: 3.1959324°N 101.5816483°E

Other transcription(s)
  - Jawi: كوتا دامنسارا
  - Chinese: 哥打白沙罗
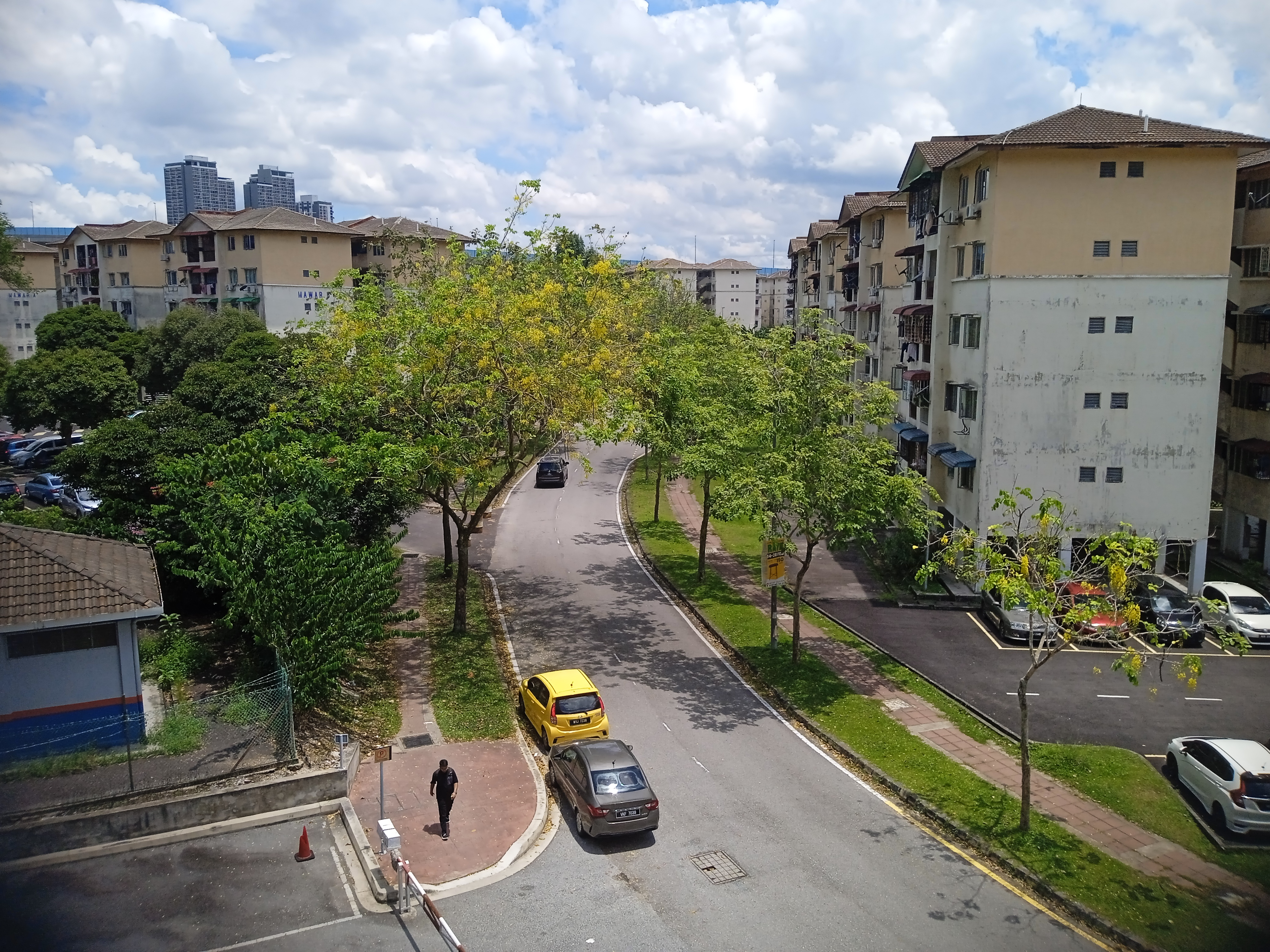
- Interactive map of Kota Damansara
- Country: Malaysia
- State: Selangor
- District: Petaling
- Established: 1992

Government
  - Administered by: Petaling Jaya City Council

Population
  - Total: 500,000
- Time zone: UTC+8 (MST)
- Postcode: 47810
- Area codes: +603-61x, +603-76x
- Website: www.mbpj.gov.my

Kota Damansara is an affluent township located in Petaling Jaya, Petaling District, Selangor, Malaysia. It is a township spread across 4,000 acres (1,600 ha).

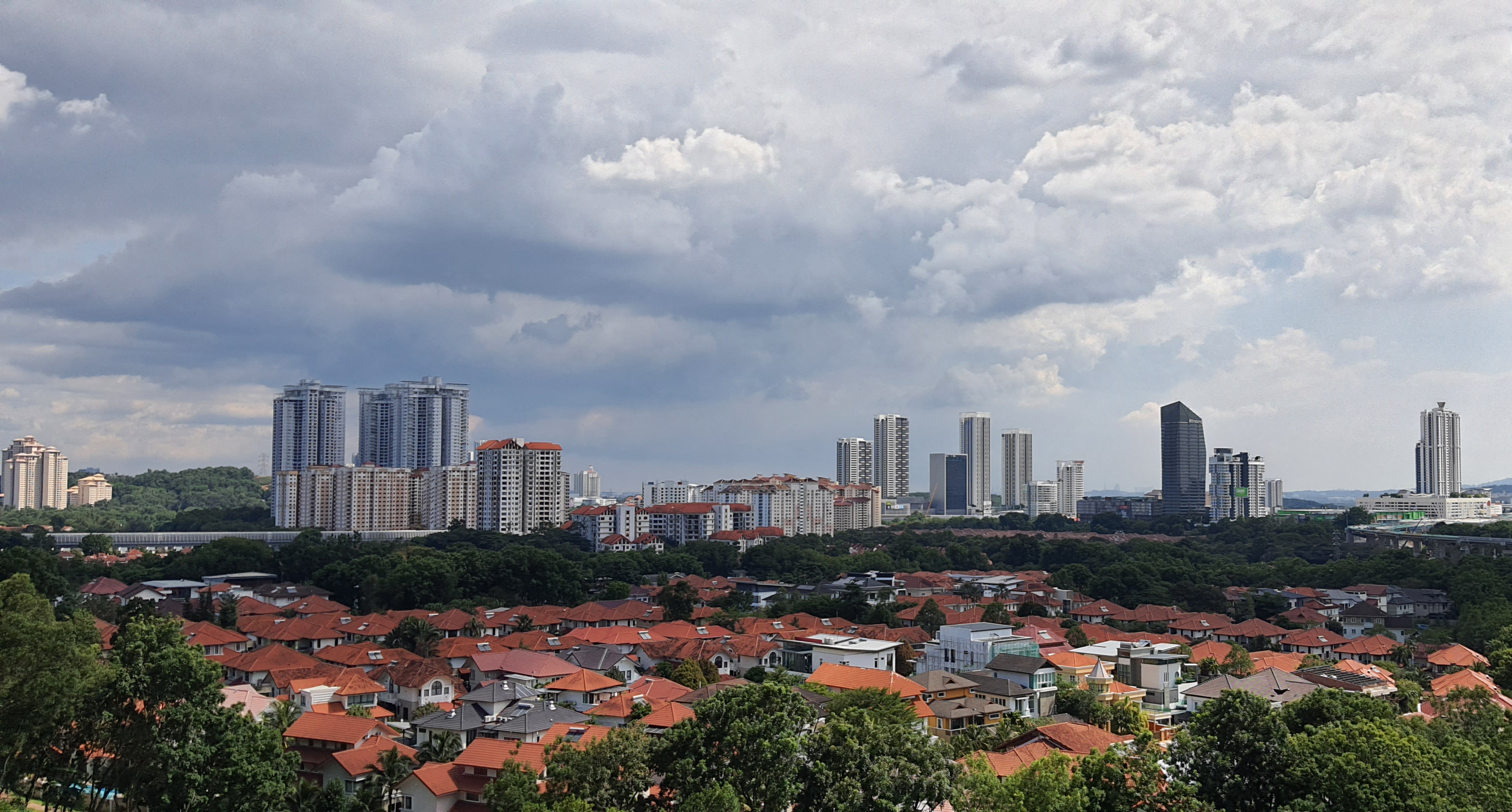
A panoramic view of Kota Damansara facing southwest, taken from Mutiara Damansara in 2021.

It is also a state seat constituency which is sandwiched between Subang and Petaling Jaya. Notable landmarks located near the constituency are the Sultan Abdul Aziz Shah Airport and the Rubber Research Institute of Malaysia. Kota Damansara comes under the Sungai Buloh parliamentary constituency.

== Transportation ==
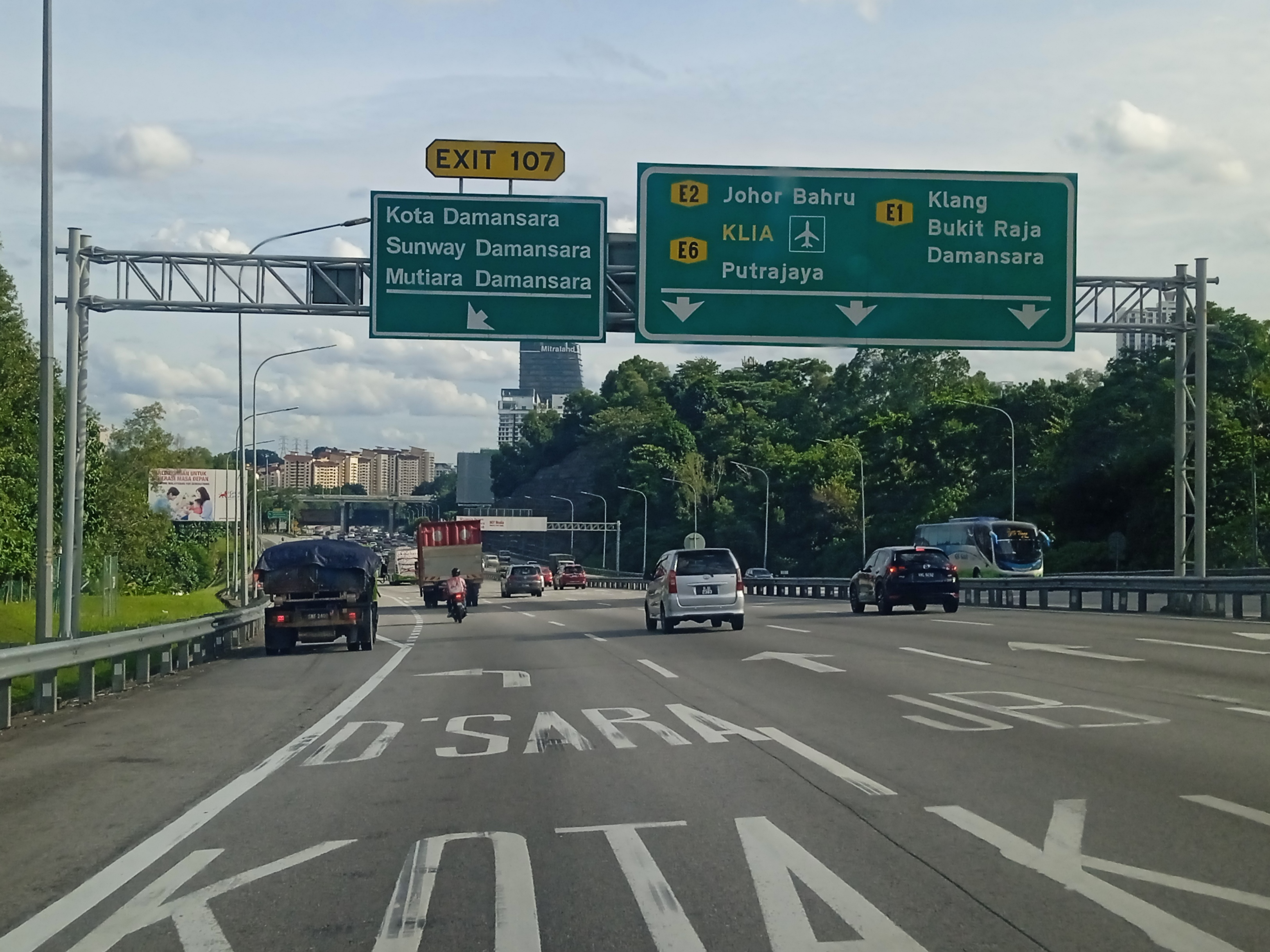
New Klang Valley Expressway towards Kota Damansara Interchange

It is served by Kota Damansara MRT station and Surian MRT station on MRT Kajang Line, with operations began on 2016. The area is also accessible by Rapid KL bus route 780 (Kota Damansara–Hab Pasar Seni) and 802 (LRT Kelana Jaya–Kota Damansara).

Rapid KL MRT feeder bus route T801 (MRT Kwasa Sentral–Seksyen 6,7,8 and 9 Kota Damansara), T805 (MRT Kota Damansara–Seksyen 4,5 Kota Damansara via Selangor Science Park), T807 (MRT Surian–Ara Damansara), and T808 (MRT Surian–Seksyen 11 Kota Damansara), serve as the first-last mile connectivity in neighbourhood in Kota Damansara to Kwasa Sentral MRT station, Kota Damansara MRT station and Surian MRT station.

== See also ==
- Kota Damansara Community Forest Park
