= Kuala Selangor Nature Park =

Protected national park in Malaysia

- Taman Alam Kuala Selangor
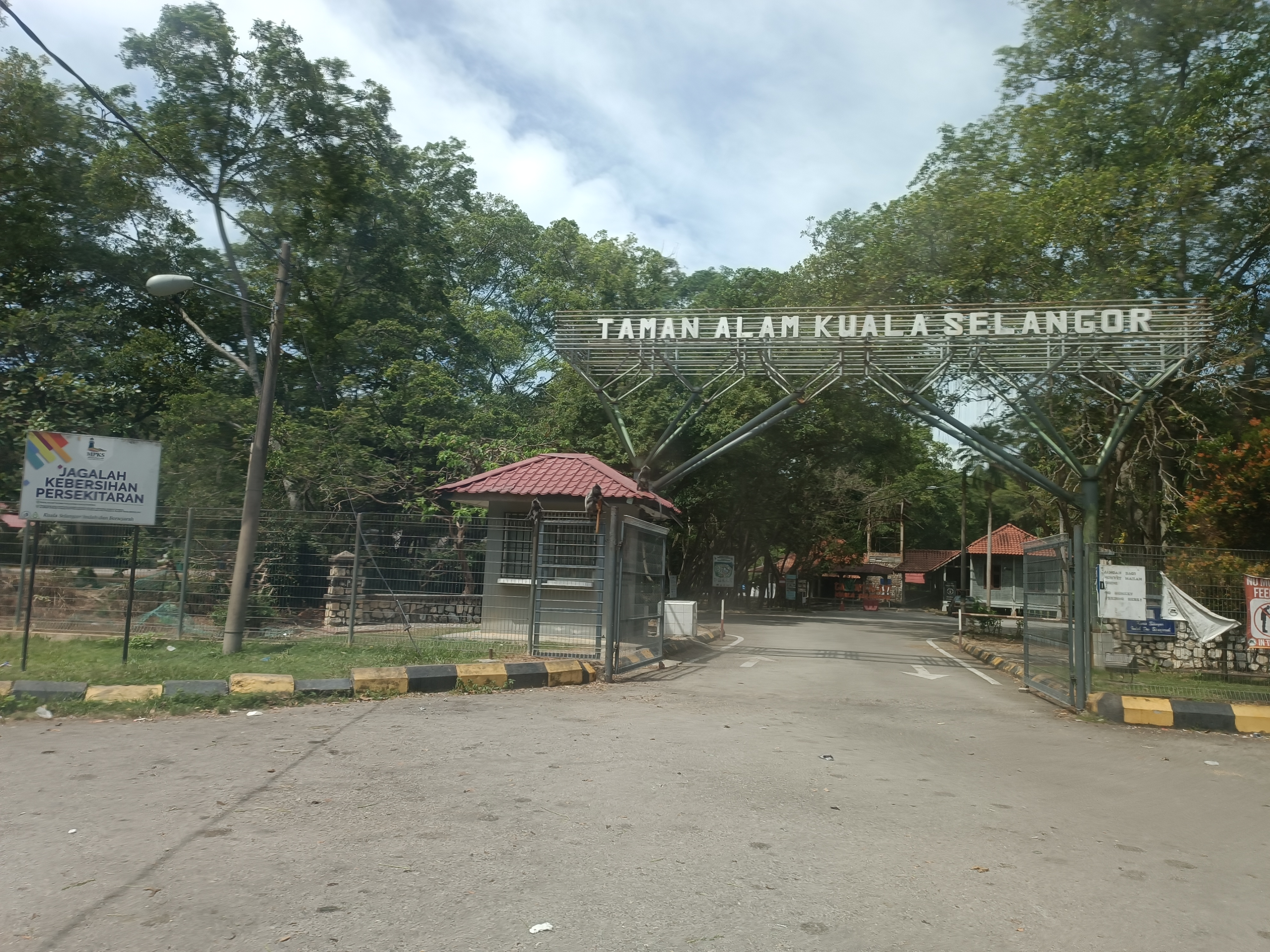
- Interactive map of Kuala Selangor Nature Park
- Location: Kuala Selangor, Selangor, Malaysia
- Area: 2.4 km^{2} (0.93 sq mi)
- Established: 1987

The Kuala Selangor Nature Park (KSNP; Malay: Taman Alam Kuala Selangor) is a park located by the mouth of the Selangor River in Kuala Selangor District, Selangor, Malaysia. It was established by the Selangor state government in 1987 and has been managed by the Malaysian Nature Society which has proposed that it be declared a wetland of international importance.

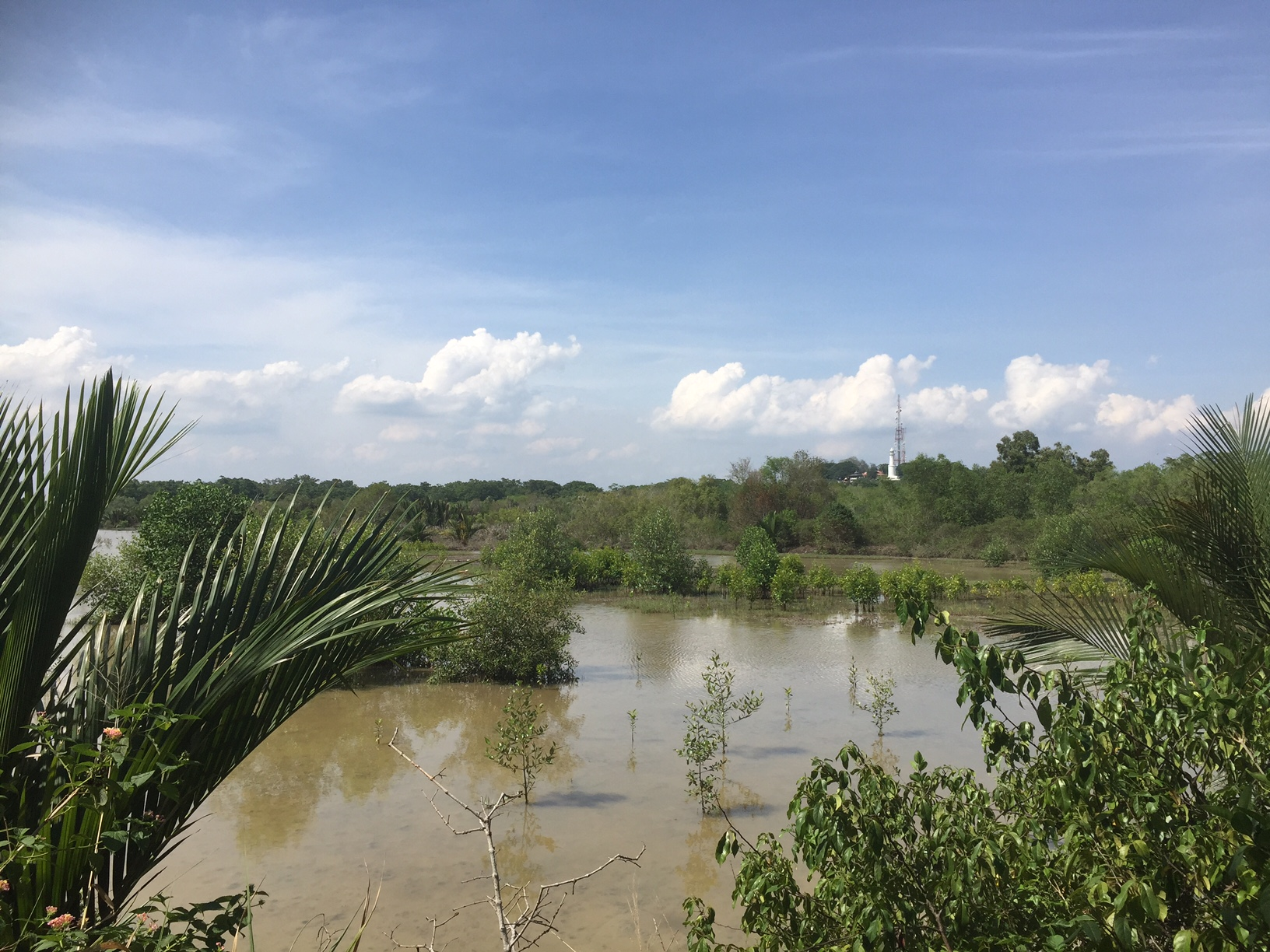
Man-made lake

With a total area of 2.4 km^{2} (0.93 sq mi), the park is a combination of secondary forest and wetland with a man-made coastal bund separating the wetland from the forest. Inside the park itself is a large pond surrounded by another bund. A water lock connecting the pond with the river controls the water level of the pond.

The park, as part of the Selangor River estuary, is home to a number of large bird species such as milky storks and herons as well as primates, namely silver leaf monkeys and long-tailed macaques. The area was a breeding ground of an endangered milky stork species before the program was suspended. An abandoned aviary still stands in the middle of the park.

== History ==
There was virgin mangrove forest in Kuala Selangor until the 1940s. However, from 1965 to the 1970s, the land was cleared to make salt evaporation ponds. Furthermore, in 1986, the land clearing started to create a marina, prawn farm, and golf course. Sand dredging for the project killed wide range of mangrove forest, and the existing secondary forest was created since then. For these reasons, Malayan Nature Society (now the Malaysian Nature Society) and the Asian Wetlands Bureau (now Wetlands International) made a petition to the government of Selangor state, and the land was established as a park by the government on 27 September 1987. Endangered silvered-leaf monkey was adopted as a logo mark of the park. After that, the park have been managed by Malaysian Nature Society under a cooperative arrangement with the Selangor state government. It became the first park to be managed by a NGO in Malaysia.

In 1997, Kuala Selangor Nature Park was recognised as a nature reserve for conservation and ecotourism, and recognised as Important Bird Area (IBA) by Birdlife International.

== Park guide ==
=== Trails ===
There are two trails and one walkway in KSNP as of May 2016. They are the Main Trail traversing the secondary forest (550 meters), Bund Trail encircling the lake (1.7 km) and Mangrove Walkway extending into the mangrove forest (1.5 km). These last approximately 15 minutes, 75 minutes and 55 minutes to walk respectively. There are two watch towers that provide views of the area, and birds and other animals can be seen from the top of watch tower platform. Also, there are some gazebos for rest in the park.

=== Park Interpretive Centre ===
Open seven days a week including public holidays, 9 am to 6 pm. Visitors can purchase admission tickets and souvenirs, reserve a room of accommodation, and get information about the park. Entrance fee: RM4 for adult, RM1 for children or student (7–16 years old), RM2 for senior citizen (above 60 years old) and MNS member and free for kids (under 6 years old).

=== Accommodation ===
Visitors can request to stay in the park. There are A-frame huts (2 persons per hut), chalets (3 persons per chalet), dormitories (6 persons per dorm), and a hostel for large group of people. Camping site for campers is also available here upon advance booking.

=== Other facilities ===
Public toilets, public washrooms, seminar hall, Muslim prayer room etc.

== Environmental education activities ==
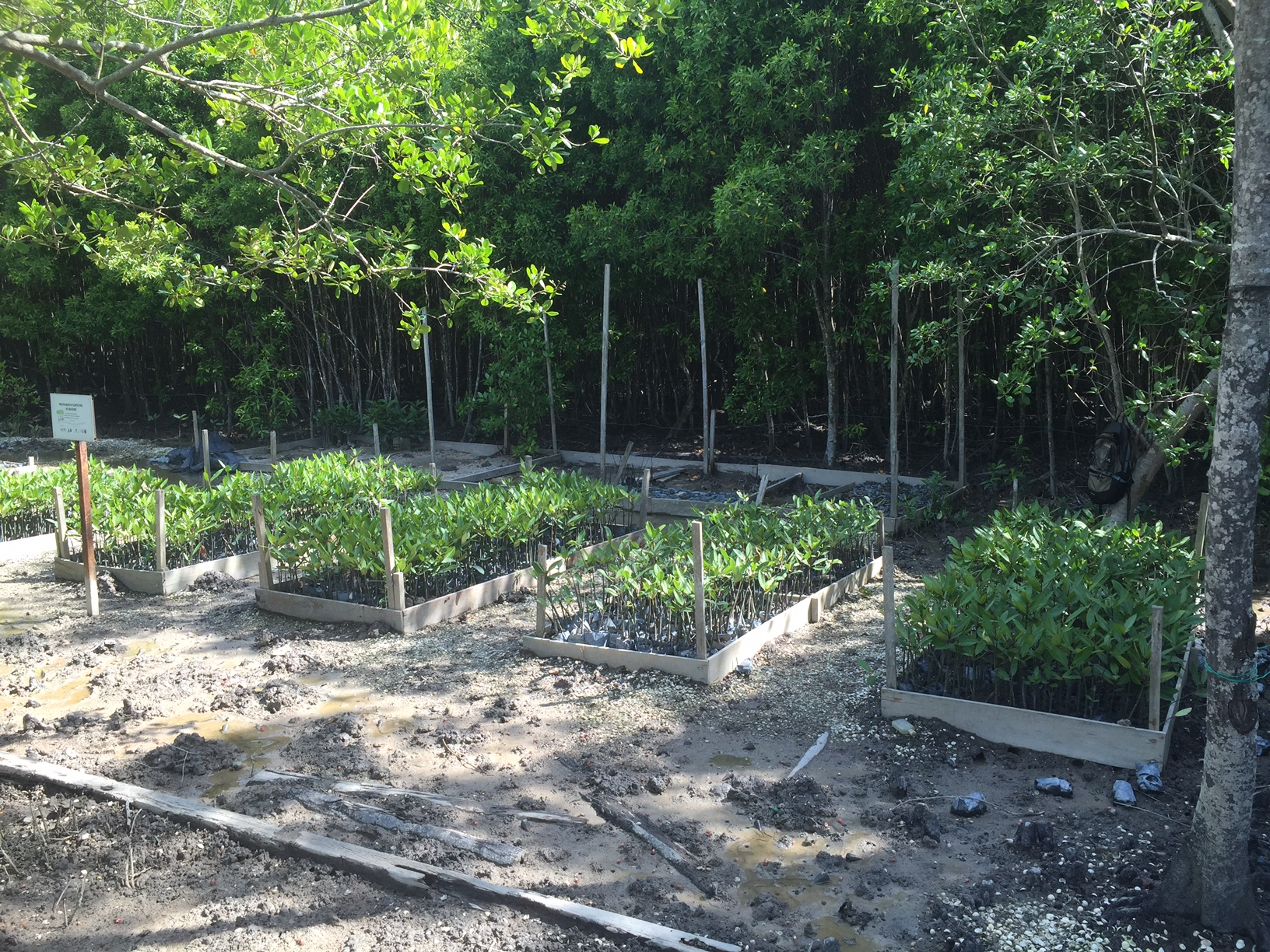
Mangrove sapling nursery

Visitors can make a reservation to participate in educational activities in Kuala Selangor Nature Park. These activities are generally conducted for a group of more than 20 individuals. Examples: Indoor activities such as nature craft and paper recycling, and outdoor activities such as guided tours, mangrove tree planting, night walk, and bird watching.

== Examples of species which can be seen in KSNP ==
- Plants: mangrove trees (13 species such as buta-buta, bakau kurap, and perepat), noni, sea almond, sea hibiscus, and bird lime tree
- Molluscs: mud-creepers, blood cockles, and belitong
- Annelids: peanut worms
- Cnidarians: sea anemones
- Insects: coconut rhinoceros beetle, weaver ants, striped blue crow, and mangrove cricket
- Reptiles: monitor lizard, dog-faced water snake, and reticulated python
- Fishes: mudskippers, red-tipped halfbeak, banded archerfish, and spotted green pufferfish
- Chelicerates: horseshoe crab
- Crustaceans: fiddler crab, mangrove hermit crab, and tree-climbing crabs
- Birds
  - Resident birds (98 species such as pink-necked pigeon, peaceful dove, great egret, grey heron, little heron, milky stork, collared kingfisher, and brahminy kite)
  - Migratory birds (57 species such as Mongolian plover, common redshank, blue-tailed bee-eater, and black-capped kingfisher)
- Mammals: Selangor silvered langur, long-tailed macaque, plantain squirrel, common palm civet, smooth otter, short-tailed mongoose, leopard cat, and short-nosed fruit bat

== Getting to KSNP ==
Visitors can board the bus from Kuala Lumpur (Selangor Omnibus 100) and it takes about 2 hours to reach the new bus terminal in Kuala Selangor. Visitors have to take a taxi to this park or change buses for old town. Thereafter, walk along the street on the left side of the slope towards Bukit Melawati. It takes about 5 minutes to walk from the bus stop in old town to KSNP.

== Tourist spots around KSNP ==
- Freshwater Fish Park: It is an aquarium next to the KSNP and has about 1500 individuals from 60 species of freshwater fish. Many of them are from Selangor River.
- Bukit Melawati: Visitors can see a whole view of the area, a lighthouse, Selangor kingdom history and remains of fort.
- Kelip-Kelip Kampung Kuantan and Kampung Bukit Belimbing / Firefly Park Resort: It is famous for firefly-watching boat tour.
- Pantai Remis: It has become one of the favourite tourist area of Selangor, especially during weekends. Tourists can see sunset at the beach, kite playing and beach activities.
- Fishing Village: It is located along the Selangor River. There are some seafood restaurants.

== See also ==
- Geography of Malaysia
- Malaysian Nature Society
