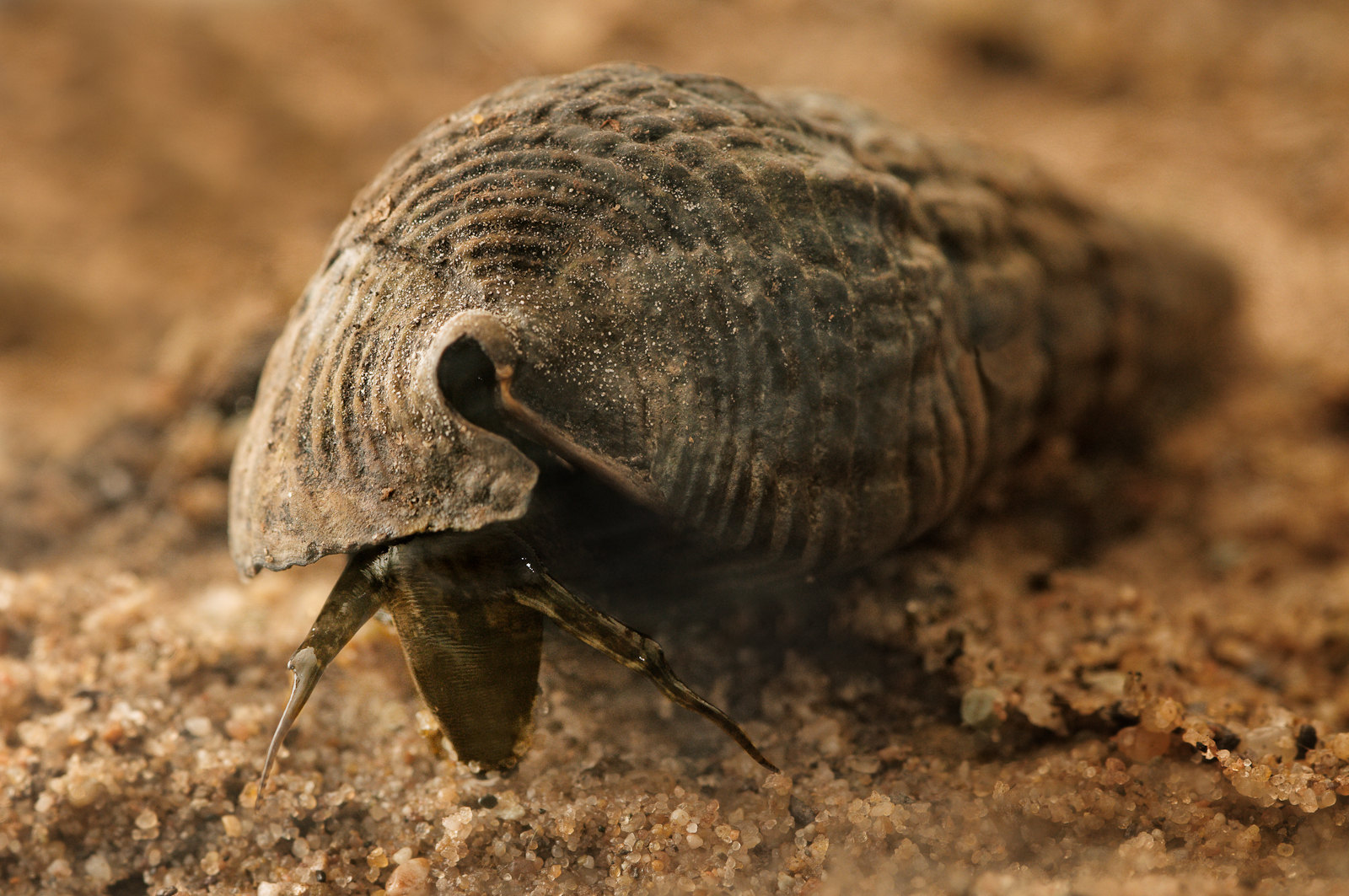
- Terebralia palustris
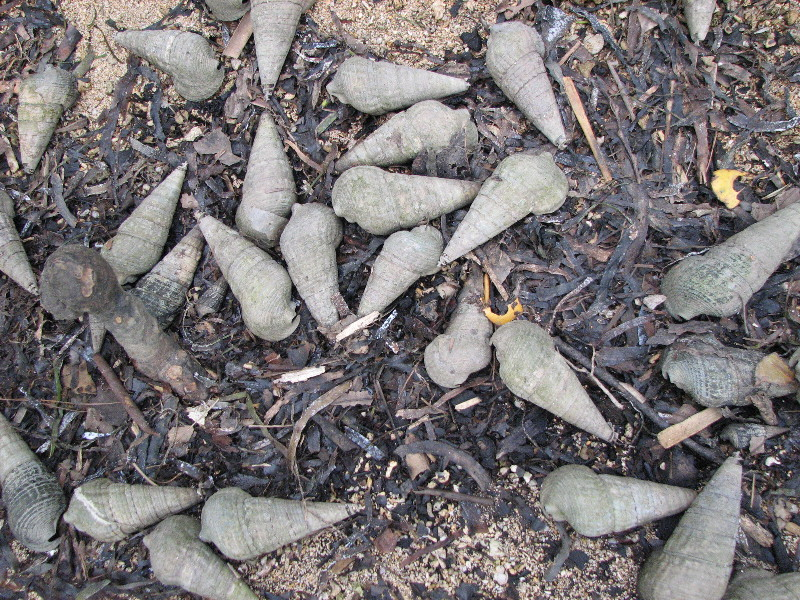
- Terebralia palustris

Scientific classification
- Kingdom: Animalia
- Phylum: Mollusca
- Class: Gastropoda
- Subclass: Caenogastropoda
- Family: Potamididae
- Genus: Terebralia
- Species: T. palustris

Binomial name
- Terebralia palustris (Linnaeus, 1767)

Synonyms
- Cerithium carinatum Perry, G., 1811; Potamides palustris (Linnaeus, 1767); Strombus agnatus Gmelin, J.F., 1791; Strombus augustus Gmelin, J.F., 1791; Strombus crassum Lamarck, J.B.P.A. de, 1822; Strombus trisulcatus Forskål, P., 1775

= Terebralia palustris =

Species of gastropod

Terebralia palustris, commonly known as the giant mangrove whelk, is a species of brackish-water snail, a mollusk in the family Potamididae. This tropical species which inhabits mangrove environments of the Indo-West Pacific region, has the widest geographic distribution amongst the potamidids extending from eastern Africa to northern Australia. Terebralia palustris is the largest mangrove gastropod, with a maximum shell length of 190 mm recorded from Arnhem Land, Australia.

== Distribution ==
This species has the widest distribution range of any Terebralia species. Its Western Pacific distribution extends south from the Ryukyus to the Philippines and across Borneo, New Guinea and tropical Australia. Eastwards, T. palustris is found as far as Palau as well the New Hebrides and New Caledonia.

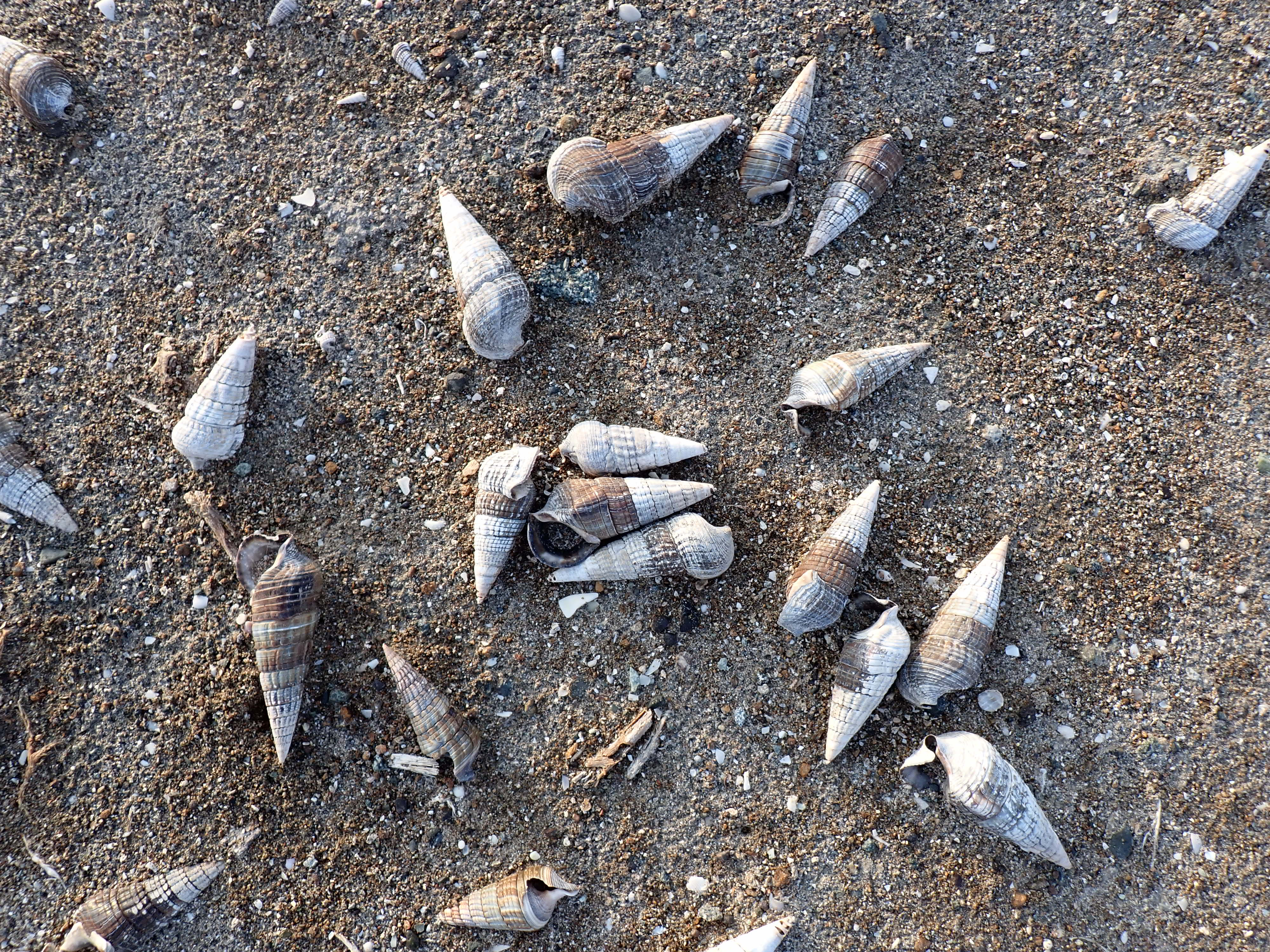
Terebralia palustris from Liwa, Oman

The Indian Ocean occurrence of Terebralia palustris includes mangrove habitats throughout Indonesia and regions of South East Asia including India and Ceylon. The species has also been reported from the Andaman Islands, Nicobar, the Maldives, Mauritius, the Seychelles, the Amirantes and Madagascar. Terebralia palustris also occurs along the tropical and subtropical East African coastline including Kenya, Tanzania and Mozambique. The southern global distribution limit for this species is along the eastern subtropical coastline of South Africa. The northward extension of the African distribution is as far as the Red Sea.

== Description ==
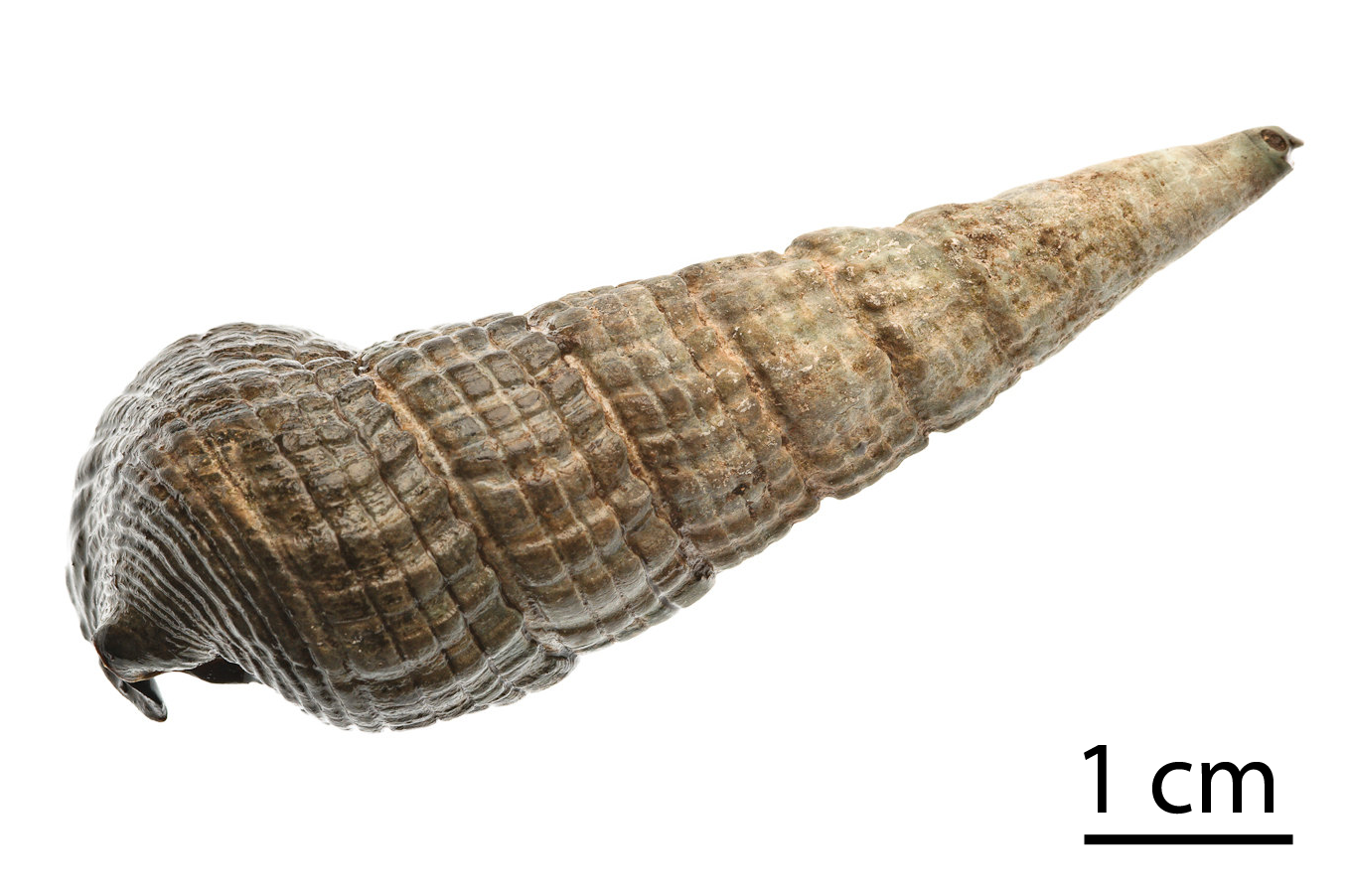
a shell of Terebralia palustris

=== Shell ===
The shell is generally described as elongate, thick, solid and turreted. It comprises as many as 20 flat-sided whorls with the early whorls being sculptured with strong colabral axial ribs. Spiral incised lines appear on the ninth or tenth whorl. These gradually increase in number to three. Growth is determinate for this species and full maturity is indicated by a thickened aperture margin. The size of mature adult snails varies between populations and in some cases maturity has been reported for individuals at only 45 mm total shell length.

=== Anatomy ===
The head and foot are typically dark brown while the snout and tips of the cephalic tentacles are black. In females, a ciliated groove on the right side of the foot leads to a large, bulbous white ovipositor which is situated internally near the base of the foot.

The hemocyanin of this species was analyzed by Lieb et al. in 2010. Its mega-hemocyanin have unusually high oxygen affinities.

== Ecology ==
It lives in the mud in mangrove forests. Terebralia palustris is a predominantly mangrove-associated species.
