= Malaysian Nature Society =

Environmental non-governmental organization in Malaysia

- Persatuan Pencinta Alam Malaysia
- Abbreviation: MNS
- Formation: 1940; 86 years ago
- Type: Charity
- Location: Bukit Persekutuan, Kuala Lumpur, Malaysia
- Services: Lobbying, research, consultancy, sustainable technology.
- Staff: 40 (nationwide)
- Website: www.mns.my

Malaysian Nature Society (Malay: Persatuan Pencinta Alam Malaysia, lit. 'Malaysia Nature Lovers Association', abbrev: MNS) is the oldest and one of the most prominent environmental not for profit, non-governmental organisations in Malaysia. It was first established, as the Malayan Nature Society, with the launch of the Malayan Nature Journal, in 1940. Initially primarily as a scientific organisation, today MNS is involved in a wide range of environmental activities and campaigns. In 2008 MNS was awarded the inaugural Merdeka Award for the environment, primarily for its efforts in campaigning for the protection of the Belum-Temengor forests of Malaysia. MNS is a voluntary, membership-based organisation with approximately 3800 members.

The Society has branches in most of the states in Malaysia. One of the branches was located in Singapore due to the historical ties the island state has with Malaysia. The Singaporean branch later transformed itself into an independent Nature Society (Singapore) in 1991.

== Principal achievements ==
MNS has been credited for a number of conservation achievements as a result of public campaigns. One of the first of these successes was the halting of the quarrying at Batu Caves in 1980. This was followed by the creation of Endau Rompin National Park, following its expeditions there in 1985 and 1986. More recently, it succeeded in its campaigns to get the northern part of Belum-Temengor declared a state park and for a national park to be established on Penang island.

MNS' Kuala Selangor Nature Park (KSNP) was honoured and acknowledged in July 2012 by the Selangor State Government, as one of the best ecotourism sites in the state. In September 2012, MNS bagged the EU-Malaysia Chamber of Commerce & Industry Europa 2012 Award at a gala dinner in Kuala Lumpur. MNS also received honour by UKM with Community Engagement Excellence Award in recognition for its outstanding partnership with Universiti Kebangsaan Malaysia (UKM) in reaching out to communities.

Besides, MNS was honoured the "Pertubuhan Cemerlang" or Excellent Society award by the Registrar of Societies of Malaysia in March 2014. Furthermore, MNS was awarded by KFEMCA (Korean Federation for Environmental Movements in Cheonan-Asan) and KEEC (Kwang Environmental Education Center) in January 2015.

MNS has also been influential in changing government policy on environmental issues ranging from industrial pollution to wildlife protection to banning Shark's fin soup from official government functions.

== Members' activities ==
MNS member activities, such as evening talks and excursions on natural history topics, are organised through a network of local branches. Several branches have special interest groups focusing on one particular activity, such as bird watching, nature photography, or jungle trekking. Branches are also active in local conservation projects.

== Annual Events ==
Annually, MNS organizes two major events which focuses on habitat conservation:

Raptor Watch: celebrated annually since the year 2000 in the first weekend of March, this event was created to help promote and conserve the Tanjung Tuan. This forest is important for the migratory raptors to rest and find food as they travel back to their home in the Northern Hemisphere.

Pesta Sayap (Festival of Wings): held annually in Kuala Selangor Nature Park, this event focuses on educating local school children and the community of the importance of wetlands to the ecosystem. This festival is held in the month of October, during the migration of waterbirds.

== Conservation ==
MNS sees to the effective management of existing protected areas as well as to establish new protected areas. MNS aims to secure an integrated and comprehensive Protected Area system in Malaysia and at the same time build a knowledge base of key habitats and species with the aim to disseminate this information to decision makers. MNS also identifies threats to the survival of habitats and species in the wild.

The MNS Conservation initiatives are also guided by key documents such as the Important Bird Area (IBA) data which has been compiled since 1997 with the assistance of the MNS Bird Conservation Council and BirdLife International. Conservation is also guided by the MNS Blueprint for Conservation (established in 1974) which calls for the conservation of notable areas such as national parks, reserves, islands, national monuments, wildlife sanctuaries, marine reserves and research sites in Peninsular Malaysia.

== Education ==
MNS runs a program of Nature Clubs (Kelab Pencinta Alam, KPA) for schools throughout Malaysia. It began with a pioneer group of 12 schools throughout the Klang Valley and today, its membership stands at 318 schools from all over Malaysia. The KPA programme aims to encourage interest, understanding and involvement in various environmental activities and conservation efforts amongst the school-going generation. There are some of special programmes held for KPA, for instances National Teachers Workshop, KPA camp and workshop, Peat Swamp study, Raptor Watch and School River Basin & Water Quality Monitoring.

As the extension of KPA, MNS introduced the KPA for Youth programme which the main purpose for initiative is to encourage youth membership where MNS want to cultivate the sense of nature conservation through environmental activities involving youths and communities. Coca-Cola Malaysia first partnered Malaysian Nature Society (MNS) to develop the Water Vision program that aims to inculcate a sense of water conservation amongst youth. In addition, MNS runs education programs at Rimba Ilmu of the Universiti Malaya and at the Forest Research Institute of Malaysia (FRIM).

== Parks and nature centres ==
MNS's parks and centres include:

1. Kuala Selangor Nature Park
2. Nature Education Centre (NECs) in Forest Research Institute Malaysia
3. Dark Caves at Batu Caves
4. ecoCare Centre in Kerteh
5. Environmental Interpretive Centre (EIC) in Sepang
6. Urban Environmental Education Hub in Midvalley Megamall
7. Boh Tea Estate chalet in the Cameron Highlands.

== Publications and communication ==
MNS has the following periodical publications:

1. Malayan Nature Journal is the original MNS publication that has now become a quarterly peer-reviewed scientific journal covering ecology and conservation in Malaysia and the surrounding region.
2. Malaysian Naturalist is a quarterly magazine on the natural history of Malaysia that is free for members and is also sold at newsstands (ISSN 1511-970X).
3. Secretariat News is a supplement to the MN that is provided to MNS members.
4. Pencinta Alam is the Society's free monthly newsletter.
5. Suara Enggang is a bimonthly bulletin of the MNS Bird Conservation Council, focusing on interesting sightings and bird conservation issues.
6. Tapir is the quarterly bulletin of the MNS Kelab Pencinta Alam (KPA) school nature clubs.

The MNS Conservation Publication series are a collection of reports and advisory papers.

== Logo ==
The society logo is based on a Malayan tapir. Under the IUCN Red List, the species is listed as endangered. The species is distributed in Sumatra and the Malay Peninsula, Thailand and Myanmar. Sightings have been recorded at other places such as deeper in the Indochina but such reports are unconfirmed.

== Office ==
The MNS headquarters is located at Bukit Persekutuan, Kuala Lumpur.

== Notable members ==
Founding members of MNS included Gladys Le Mare, E. O. Shebbeare and Edred John Henry Corner. Several notable naturalists have been awarded honorary membership of MNS including Henry Nicholas Ridley, John Leonard Harrison, Loke Wan Tho, Lim Boo Liat and the 6th Earl of Cranbrook. Past presidents of MNS include Elliott McClure and Salleh Mohd. Nor. Past patrons have included Abdul Aziz Abdul Majid and Mahathir Mohamad. A French botanist, Francis Hallé is also a member of this association.
