= Safari Lagoon Waterpark =

Water park in Hulu Langat, Selangor, Malaysia

Safari Lagoon Waterpark was a former water park in the housing area of Pandan Perdana, in Pandan, Selangor, Malaysia, operating between 1998 and 2007.

== Background ==
It was the first water park built on a rooftop in the Klang Valley and was touted as the biggest of its kind in Malaysia. The park featured animal sculptures and lush greenery for a safari look. The park is owned by Dirga Niaga Sdn Bhd and reportedly cost RM 28 million and its Operations Water Park Consultant was Mon S Sudesh . The park covered 120,000 square feet and was located on the seventh floor of Pandan Safari Shopping Complex.

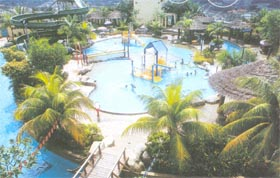
Safari Lagoon Waterpark

== Closure ==
In January 2007, there was an incident where an employee drowned in one of the park's pools when he was trapped inside a high-pressure water pump while retrieving a visitor's items. Following that, it was revealed that the theme park had been operating for the last nine years without a license from the Ampang Jaya Municipal Council (MPAJ).

The park was closed shortly after; a part of it was later reused as a restaurant, but largely deserted by 2014. Nevertheless, the shopping complex beneath it continued to operate until 2015.
