= Ampang Recreational Forest =

Forest in Malaysia

Coordinates: 3.1859138°N 101.6397053°E

Ampang Recreational Forest (Malay: Taman Rimba Ampang) is a lowland dipterocarp forest in Ampang, Selangor, Malaysia. It takes its name from the Ampang River, which flows through the forest.

The forest is one of the most popular nature sites in the Klang Valley. The stream and shady play-grounds are popular for family outings on weekends.

== History ==
The Ampang Water Catchment Area was given protected status during colonial times as an intake point for piped water for the city of Kuala Lumpur. The Ampang Intake Point and treatment plant is still in operation just upstream of the recreational forest. The road to the intake point provided easy access from Kuala Lumpur via Jalan Ampang. This accessibility combined with the peaceful serenity of the location caused the state government to set aside the forest for public amenity. In 2005 the forest was included in the much-larger Selangor State Park.

=== Administration ===
The recreational forest comes under the management of the Selangor State Forestry Department. A nominal fee is charged for the carpark and entry to the forest.

== Nature, flora and fauna ==
Numerous species of plants and animals can be seen in the forest. The site is also frequented by birdwatchers.

== Development ==
Several bridges, pedestrian walkways, toilets, playgrounds and other facilities have been built in the park over the years. Many were damaged by floods, most recently by those following the storm on 17 March 2012.

== Transportation ==
The park can be reached by taking a train to the Ampang LRT station and then taking a taxi to the park.
