= Begonia aequilateralis =

Scientific classification
- Kingdom: Plantae
- Clade: Tracheophytes
- Clade: Angiosperms
- Clade: Eudicots
- Clade: Rosids
- Order: Cucurbitales
- Family: Begoniaceae
- Genus: Begonia
- Species: B. aequilateralis

Binomial name
- Begonia aequilateralis Irmsch.

Species of flowering plant

Begonia aequilateralis is a species of begonia known only from the Sungai Buloh area of Selangor in Peninsular Malaysia.

"...probably the most endangered begonia in the Peninsula, being known from a single small population in a forest area currently being cleared." - Kiew, p. 261

The species was first described by Edgar Irmscher in 1929.
