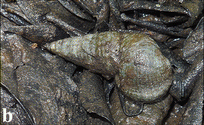
- A live Terebralia sulcata

Scientific classification
- Kingdom: Animalia
- Phylum: Mollusca
- Class: Gastropoda
- Subclass: Caenogastropoda
- Order: incertae sedis
- Family: Potamididae
- Genus: Terebralia
- Species: T. sulcata

Binomial name
- Terebralia sulcata (Born, 1778)

Synonyms
- Murex sulcatus Born, 1778 (original combination); Potamides sulcatus Born, 1778; Potamides tenerrimus Schepman, 1895

= Terebralia sulcata =

Species of gastropod

Terebralia sulcata is a species of sea snail, a marine gastropod mollusk in the family Potamididae.

== Distribution ==
Malaysia, Vietnam, Red Sea, Madagascar, Indonesia.

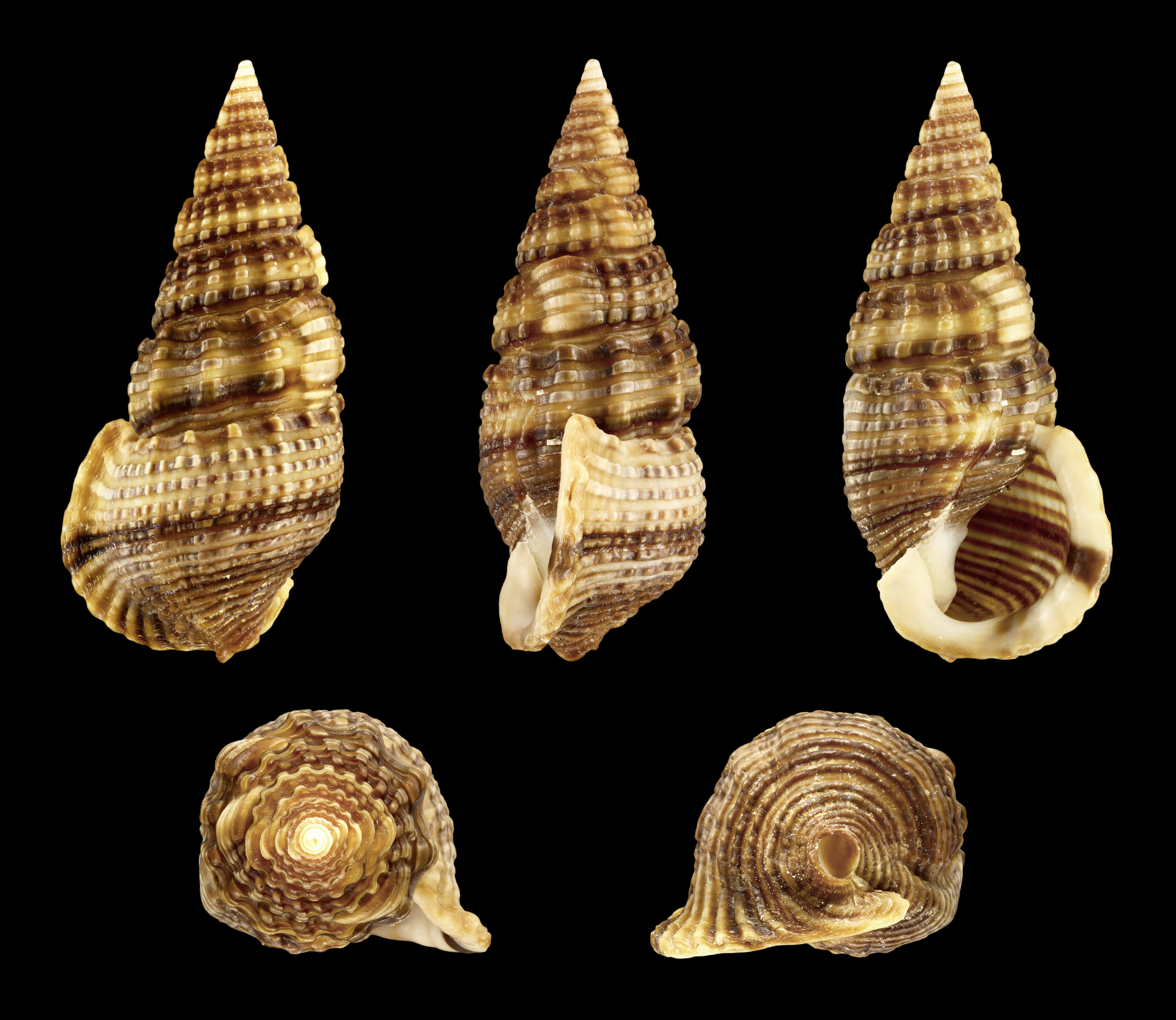
Terebralia sulcata shell.

== Ecology ==
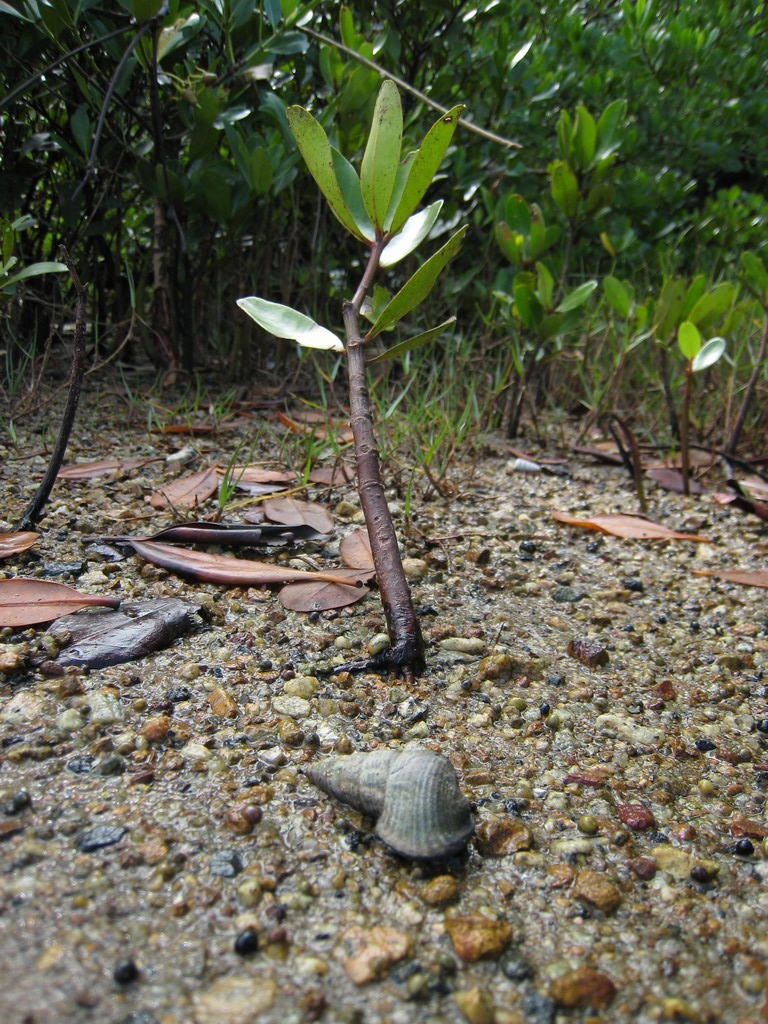
Habitat of Terebralia sulctata are mangroves.

Terebralia sulctata is a predominantly mangrove-associated species.
