= Chiling Waterfalls =

Waterfalls in Selangor, Malaysia

Coordinates: 3°35′42.6″N 101°45′3″E

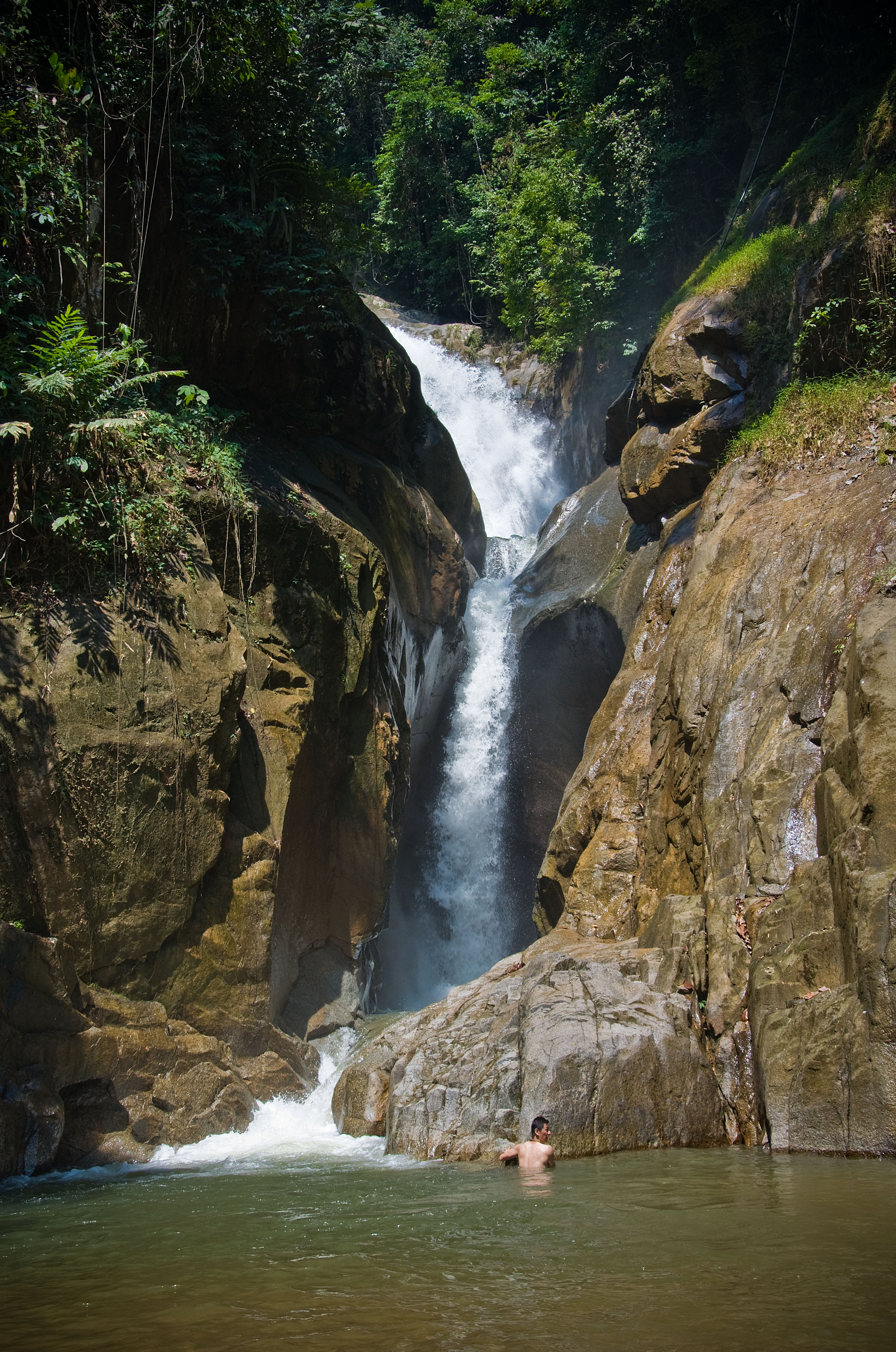
- Chiling Waterfall
- Interactive map of Chiling Waterfalls
- Location: Selangor, Malaysia
- Type: Vertical waterfalls
- Total height: Multiple tiers
- Watercourse: Chiling River

Chiling Waterfalls, located on the path to Fraser's Hill are several waterfalls located in Selangor, Malaysia. The waterfalls are composed of three separate vertical waterfalls. They are 20m tall.

== See also ==
- List of waterfalls
