= Hatter's Castle (building) =

Colonial bungalow in Selangor, Malaysia

- Interactive map of the Hatter's Castle area

General information
- Type: Guesthouse
- Architectural style: Colonial
- Location: Carey Island, Kuala Langat District, Selangor, Malaysia
- Coordinates: 2°53′12.0876″N 101°21′38.07″E
- Construction started: Early 1920s
- Completed: 1923
- Owner: Sime Darby

Design and construction
- Structural engineer: C. L. Gjorup

Hatter's Castle is a colonial bungalow located at the Sime Darby West Estate, a Sime Darby palm oil plantation in Carey Island, Kuala Langat District, Selangor, Malaysia.

== History ==
The Hatter's Castle bungalow's design is influenced by Edward Valentine John Carey, the founder of the island and palm oil plantation, while its name is inspired by a novel of the same title by Scottish author A.J. Cronin. The first occupants of the house were Danish engineer C.L. Gjorup, who built the bungalow and moved in on 1 January 1923, and James French, the first general manager of Jugra Land & Carey Limited, who occupied the top floor.

The design of Hatters Castle was so well received at the time, that it became the model for all hill station and plantation bungalows erected during the colonial era. Today Hatter's Castle is used as a guesthouse for staff, fee-paying visitors interested in staying there, and guests of Sime Darby Plantations Berhad, who owns most of the oil palm estates that cover the island.

== Design ==
Hatter's Castle had a rather extravagant architectural design, compared to other bungalows built at the same time which were much more basic and simple. With a built-up area of 495 square metres (5,330 sq ft), the European-styled bungalow spreads over four different levels and cost $25,500 to construct. Almost all the building materials were derived locally. Bricks were made locally on Carey Island while the timber came from the nearby Jugra Hill. The concrete used for the building was mixed with duck egg whites to strengthen the mixture. Only the roof tiles were imported from France and Britain.

The lower ground floor features a patio leading to the garden below the hall and stairway, while the top floor features an S-shaped apartment which can be reached via a small stairway which connects to the kitchen area. The apartment has a painted timber ceiling, plaster columns and access to a balcony. Some of the floor boards were uneven because they were built without piling work. The original windows of the bungalow were constructed without glass. To keep insects out, netting was used, which also promoted natural ventilation. Hatter's Castle also incorporates a rainwater harvesting storage system with underground tanks. Today, the water is only used for cleaning and gardening.

The 'hat' in the name originated from the domed roof, which was built over the first-floor terrace in the original design. However, the dome was removed in the 1950s due to the wooden structure's decay.

== Access ==
There is no direct public transport to Carey Island. The best way to get here is to drive from Kuala Lumpur towards Teluk Panglima Garang via the Klang–Banting Highway. From Teluk Panglima Garang, there are narrow roads to Carey Island. The drive takes about an hour.

== In popular culture ==
The Garden of Evening Mists, a film released in 2019, was partly filmed at Hatter's Castle. In the film, which is set in the 1940s, Hatters Castle is featured as the living quarters for Magnus Gemmel, one of the film's characters.
