= Gombak Selangor Quartz Ridge =

Geographical feature in Selangor Malaysia

Klang Gates Quartz Ridge
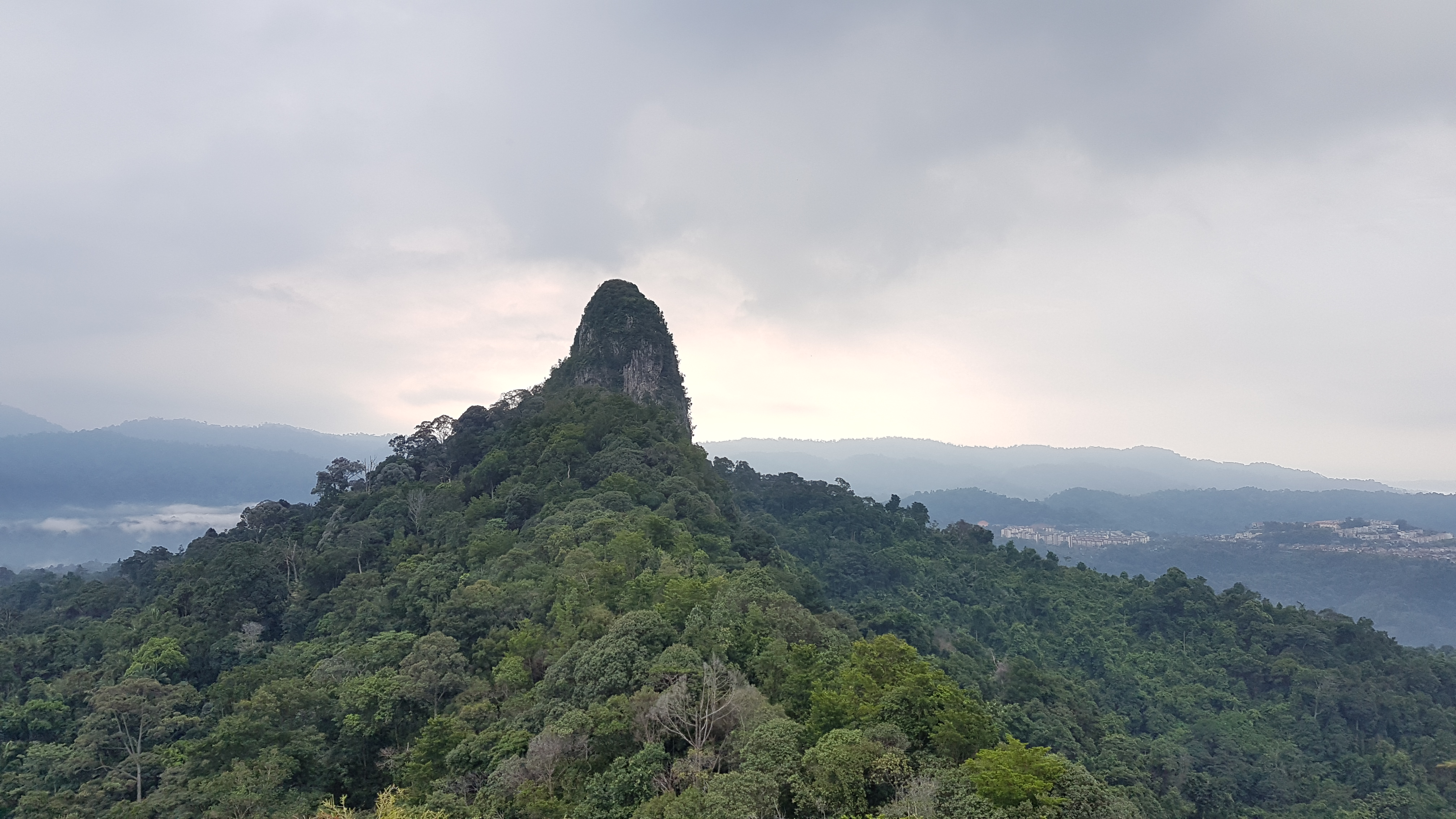
- Bukit Tabur Extreme, the highest point of the ridge, seen from the north

Highest point
- Peak: Bukit Tabur Extreme
- Elevation: 396 m (1,299 ft)

Dimensions
- Length: 9.58 km (5.95 mi)

Geography
- Location within Malaysia
- Location: Gombak District, Selangor
- Range coordinates: 3°14′00″N 101°45′09″E
- Parent range: Titiwangsa Mountains

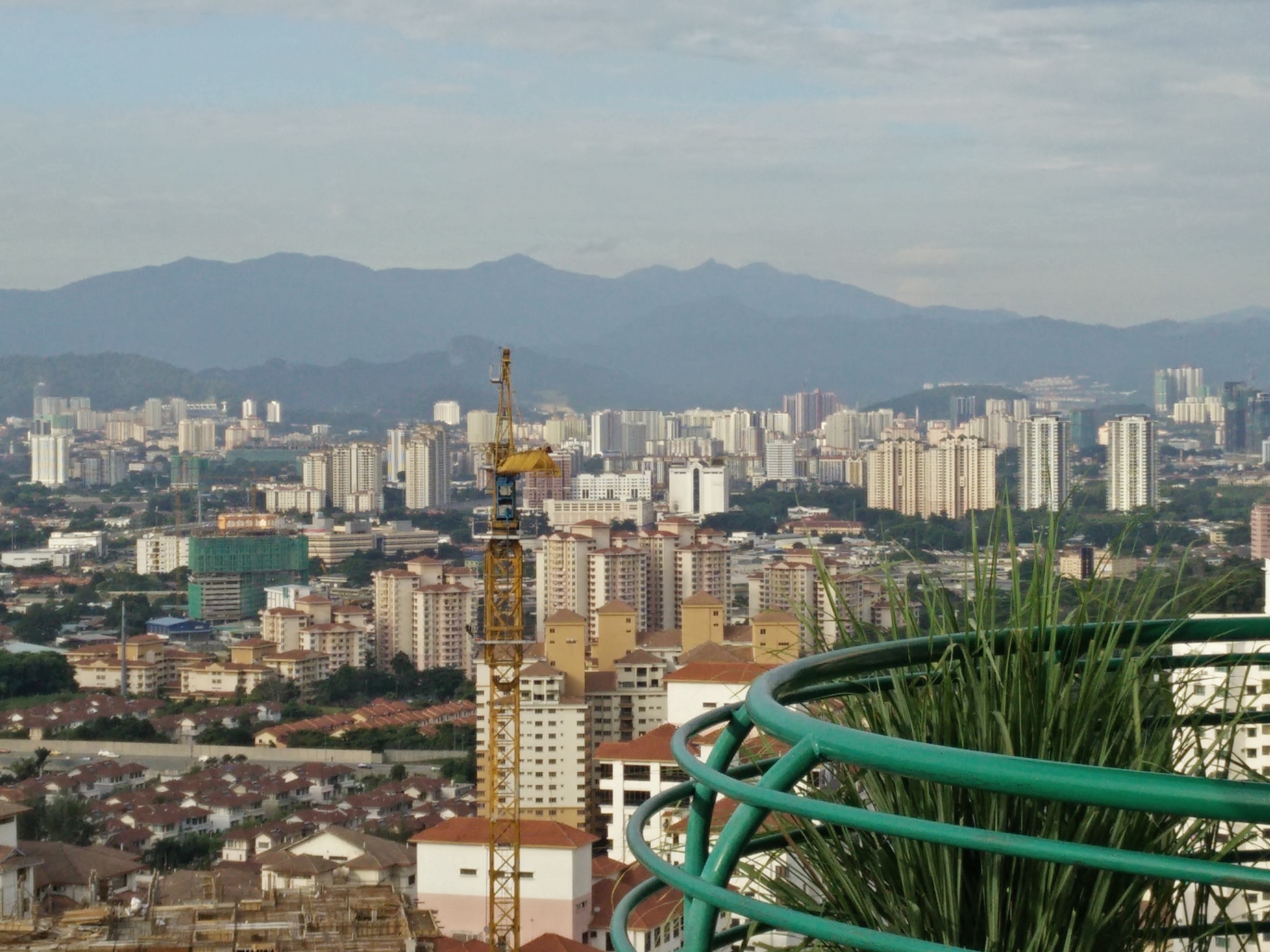
The Titiwangsa Mountains as viewed from Kuala Lumpur, with the ridge visible

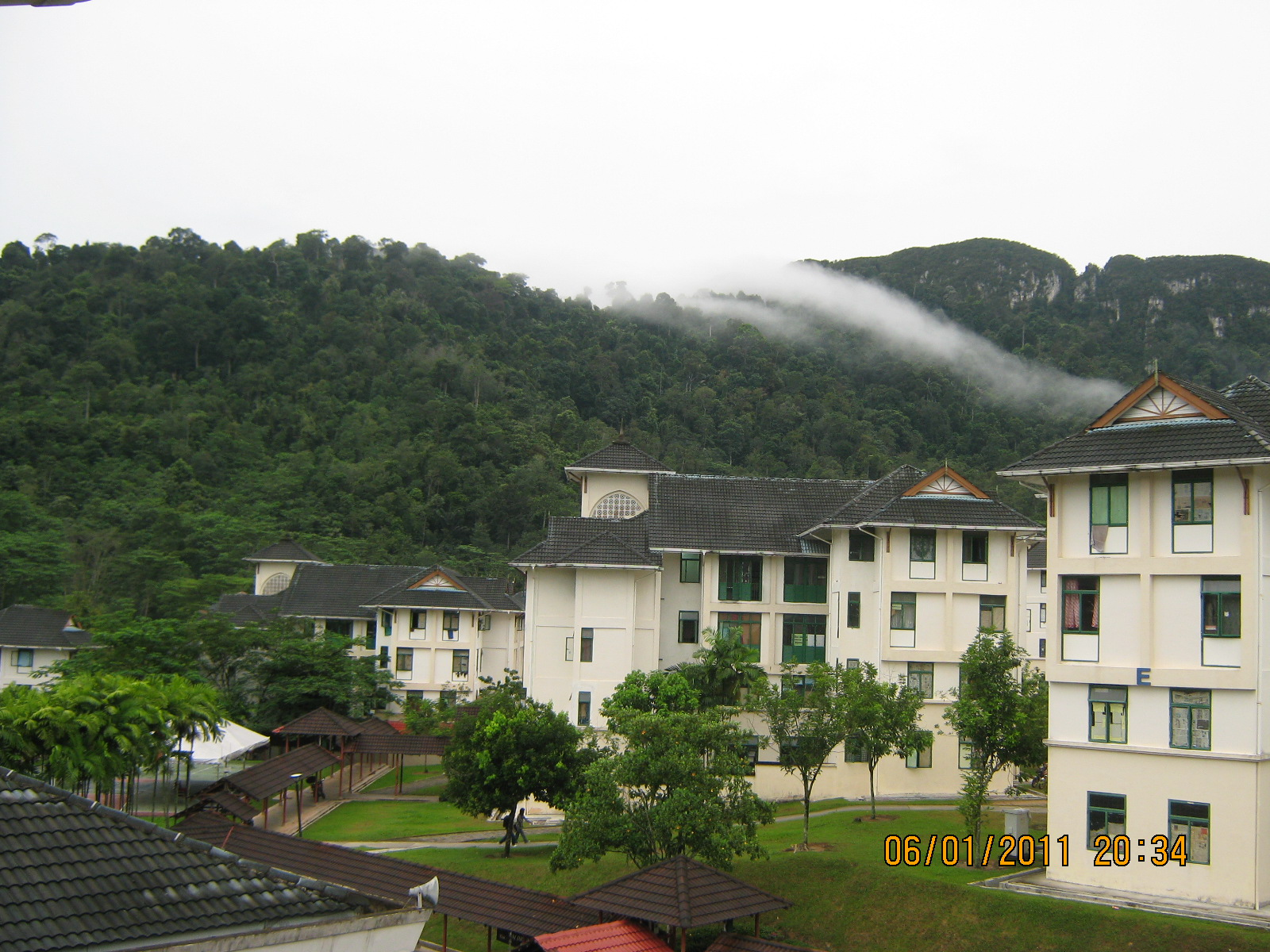
Part of the ridge as seen from a residential block of the IIUM

The Klang Gates Quartz Ridge (Malay: Permatang Kuartza Genting Klang) is a quartz dyke that runs through northeast of Kuala Lumpur and the state of Selangor, Malaysia within Bukit Lagong-Kanching-Klang Gates region. At more than 14 km long and 200 m wide, it is the longest quartz formation in the world. The other major quartz vein in Kuala Lumpur is along Kajang-Cheras road, which is about 8 km long, however the Klang Gates Quartz Ridge is one-of-its-kind because it has four types of quartz formation. The area has five endemic plant species among 265 species that are found nowhere else in the world. A rare animal, the serow (a medium-sized goat-like mammal), is found here as well.

Despite being one of the most unusual geological formations in Malaysia, the Klang Gates Quartz Ridge has little conservation and is being threatened by urban development. More recently, the proposed East Klang Valley Expressway became the latest threat towards the Klang Gates Quartz Ridge, as the expressway alignment may pass through the quartz strip. It is included on the tentative list of World Heritage Sites in Malaysia.

== Bukit Tabur ==
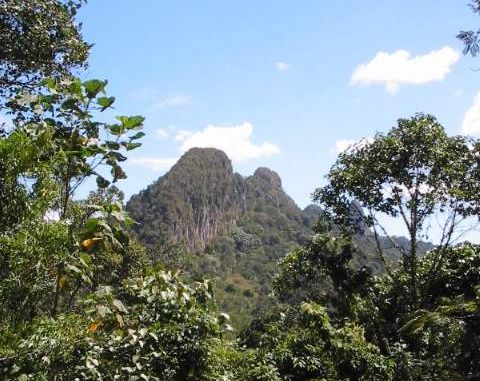
Bukit Tabur

Bukit Tabur (3°14′5″N 101°44′52″E) is a prominent part of the ridge and can be seen from the Kuala Lumpur Middle Ring Road 2. Located in Hulu Gombak Forest Reserve, it is also known locally as Bukit Hangus, Dragon's Back and Crystal Hill. The quartz ridge Hikers enter the trail near Kampung Klang Gates, 50 metres from the gates of the Klang Gates Dam, at the back of Taman Melawati for a 3-4 hour climb. The peak offers view of the dam and panoramic views of Kuala Lumpur from the north. Several endemic species of plant such as Aleisanthia rupestris are known to grow here.

Access to most parts of Bukit Tabur requires a permit from the Selangor Forestry Department. The hiking trail to Bukit Tabur can be found at 3°14′1″N 101°44′55″E.

Bukit Tabur is divided into the eastern and western section by the dam, with four discrete trails: Bukit Tabur West, Bukit Tabur East, Bukit Tabur Far East and Bukit Tabur Extreme.

There has been a series of accidents on the trail including several fatal mishaps. As a result the trail has been closed at times by the Selangor Forestry Department.

== See also ==
- Geography of Malaysia
- List of tourist attractions in Selangor
