= Forest Research Institute Malaysia =

Government agency in Malaysia

- Institut Penyelidikan Perhutanan Malaysia; FRIM

Agency overview
- Formed: 1926; 100 years ago
- Jurisdiction: Government of Malaysia
- Headquarters: Kepong, Selangor, Malaysia; 3°14′13″N 101°38′16″E
- Minister responsible: Nik Nazmi, Minister of Natural Resources and Environmental Sustainability (NRES)
- Deputy Minister responsible: Huang Tiong Sii, Deputy Minister of Natural Resources and Environmental Sustainability (NRES)
- Agency executive: Dr Ismail Parlan, Director General
- Parent agency: Ministry of Natural Resources and Environmental Sustainability (NRES)
- Website: www.frim.gov.my

Forest Research Institute Malaysia Forest Park Selangor
UNESCO World Heritage Site
- Interactive map of Forest Research Institute Malaysia Forest Park Selangor
- Criteria: iv
- Reference: 1734
- Inscription: 2025 (47th Session)
- Extensions: 589 ha

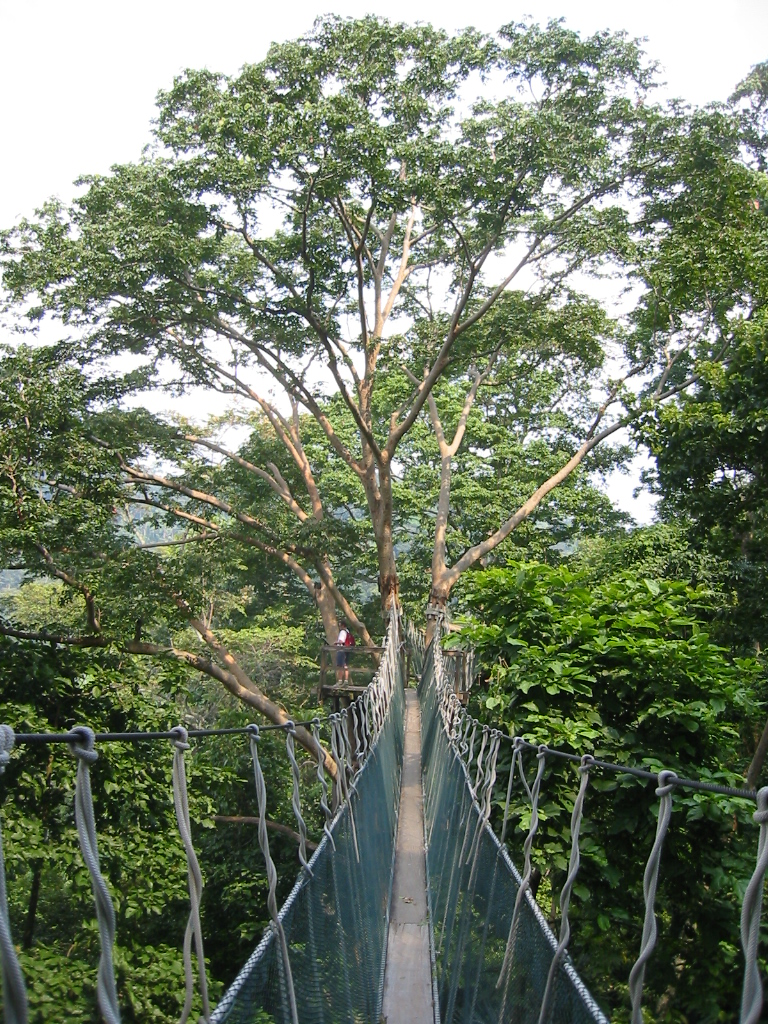
The FRIM canopy walkway, which is now permanently closed.

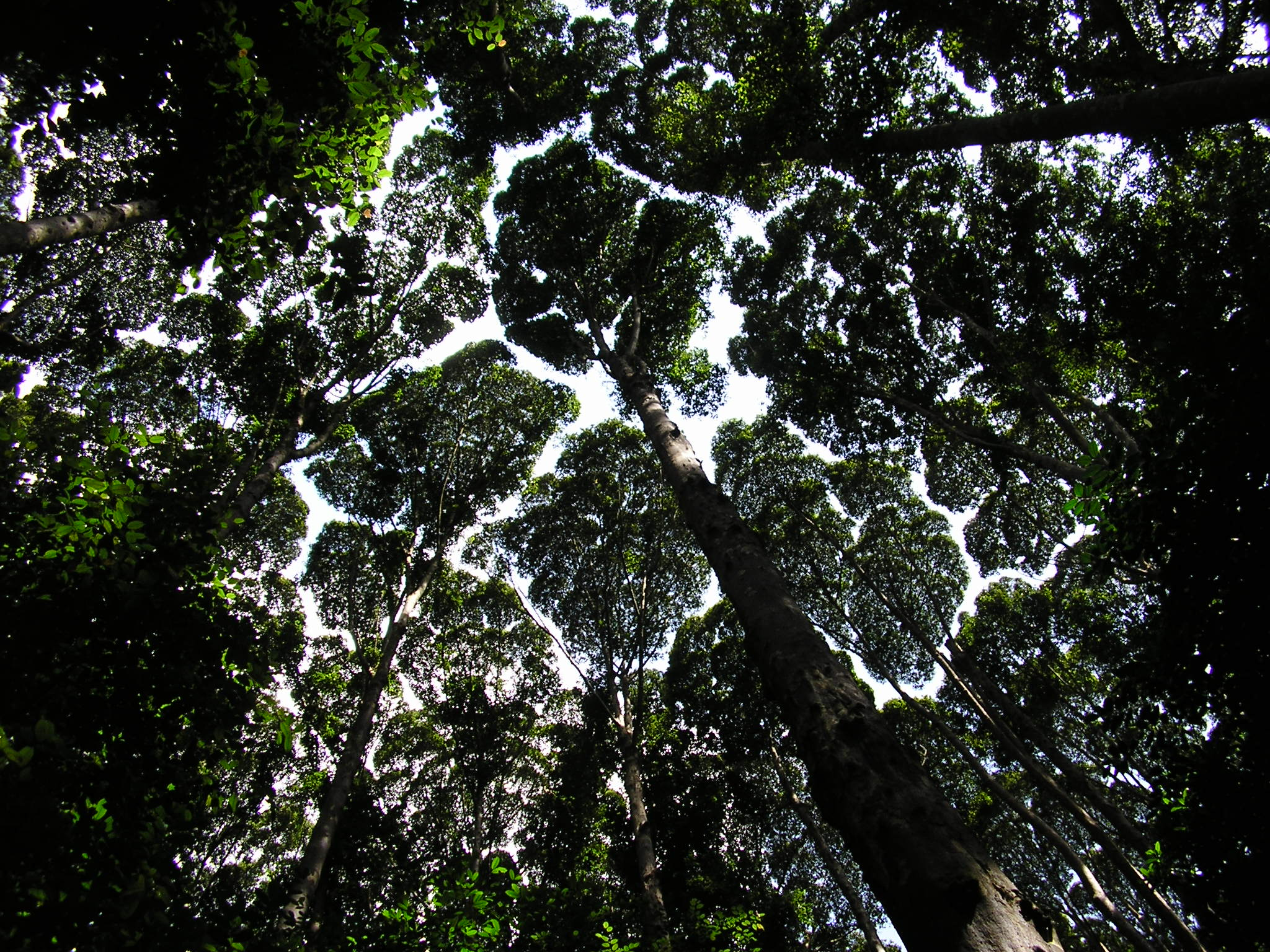
A Dryobalanops aromatica canopy at FRIM showing crown shyness.

The Forest Research Institute Malaysia (FRIM; Malay: Institut Penyelidikan Perhutanan Malaysia) is a statutory agency of the Government of Malaysia, under the Natural Resources and Environmental Sustainability (NRES). Its site in Kepong, is a 545-hectare UNESCO World Heritage Site that promotes sustainable management and optimal use of forest resources in Malaysia by generating knowledge and technology through research, development and application in tropical forestry. It sits on the border of Kuala Lumpur and Selangor, about 12 km away from KLCC, neighbouring the Bukit Langong Forest Reserve.

FRIM is the world's oldest and largest re-created tropical rain forest.

== History ==
In 1926, the chief conservator of the forest (equivalent to today's director of forestry), G.E.S Cubitt, asked Frederick William Foxworthy to establish a separate forest research unit for the Forestry Department. It was Foxworthy who selected the present site at Kepong. He was also to become the institute's first chief research officer.

The site comprised an area that was practically stripped of its original forest cover except for a few remnant trees at the more inaccessible localities. Lalang-grass scrub on the hillsides made way to vegetable terraces on the lower slopes, while the valley cradled a few ponds, the left-overs of a past tin-mining operation.

Within two years in 1928, the first 42 hectares (100 acres) of experimental plantation (mainly dipterocarps, tall hardwood species) were in place, carefully nurtured into being using "nurse" trees of other species as shade and food providers (being nitrogen-fixers). By that time the construction of the main building had begun. Completed the following years, this building was to remain the sole centre for the laboratories, herbarium, and museum, as well as the Chemistry, Zoology and Sivilculture sections of the institute, until new buildings were added after World War II. The herbarium collection, that was also moved to Kepong, numbered 1,500 accessions.

The end of the decade saw some 125 hectares of plantation established at the institute. Plantation trials with exotic species started in the early 1930s. The plantations covered 154 hectares just before the outbreak of World War II in Europe in 1939, and before the Japanese occupation of the Malay Peninsula in 1941–1945. By this time the dipterocarp and non-Dipterocarp arboreta contained 75 species (represented by 360 individual trees), while the Herbarium collection numbered nearly 40,000 accessions.

=== Establishment ===
Just before Malaysia won independence from the British Empire in 1957, some 220 hectares of plantations had been established at the institute, while the Dipterocarp and non-Dipterocarp arboreta held 201 and 168 species respectively. The herbarium collection had grown to 53,600 accessions. The Timber Research Branch had moved from Sentul to become a part of the institute at Kepong.

Six years later, Encik Abdul Rahman Mohd. Ali was appointed the institute's first Malaysian director and chief research officer. The ground of the institute expanded by a further 192 hectares in 1962 and 1964 to total 600 hectares.

In 1977 Salleh Mohd Nor was appointed to the post of director general of the institute. Eight years later, the institute was transformed into a statutory body. Through an Act of Parliament, the Malaysia Forestry Research and Development Board (MFRDB), under the Ministry of Primary Industries, was formed to administer the institute now named FOREST RESEARCH INSTITUTE of MALAYSIA (FRIM). This historic change was announced by the then Prime Minister Dr Mahathir Mohamad when he visited FRIM on 11 June 1984. The formal inauguration of FRIM took place later, on 5 April 1986.

From 2003, FRIM and MFRDB were placed under the purview of the Ministry of Natural Resources and Environment . In April 2009, FRIM was designated a Heritage Site under the National Heritage Act 2005.

In 2014, FRIM got recognition as an Authentication Centre for Herbs by the Ministry of Agriculture and Agro-Based Industry. In January 2015, it was gazetted as National Heritage.

On 1 October 2016, the new FRIM Act meant the MFRDB was replaced by the new Members of the Institute with 4 more representatives from the corporate sector to help in its commercialisation.

Starting 2017, it was awarded the MS ISO 9001:2015 certification. In 11 July 2025, the site was designated as a World Heritage Site by UNESCO in the 47th session of the UNESCO World Heritage Committee in Paris.

== Management ==
Since 30 April 2021, the Director General is Dr. Ismail Parlan, who holds a PhD from Universiti Kebangsaan Malaysia and Masters (Forest Management), Universiti Putra Malaysia, 2001. Currently, the Deputy Director General (Research) is Dr Norwati Muhammad and the Deputy Director General (Operations) is Mahmudin Saleh.

== Awards ==
Main source:

In addition to the below awards, FRIM has been awarded 45 record titles from the Malaysia Book of Records (MBR).

Award	To	For	Event	Year
Langkawi Award (Note: "ANUGERAH LANGKAWI - KELESTARIAN ALAM SEKITAR". Jabatan Alam Sekitar.)	YBhg. Tan Sri Dato’ Dr. Salleh bin Mohd Nor			1991
Petronas Inventor’s Awards				1992, 1994
National Young Scientist Award				1993
National Inventor’s Award				1993, 1995
		Research on rubber wood utilisation	International Cologne Furniture Fair	1995
International Union of Forestry Research Organisations Scientific Achievement Award (Note: "SCIENTIFIC ACHIEVEMENT AWARD LIST OF RECIPIENTS" (PDF). IUFRO.)	Abd. Latif Mohmod (1995), Su See Lee (2000), Nor Azah Mohamad Ali (2010)			1995, 2000, 2010
Public Services Department Award				1996
		Oil palm fibre extractor	25th Geneva International Invention Exhibition	1997
Toray International Science Award				1999
Nikkei Asia Prize (Note: "Past Winners". Nikkei Asia Award.)		Contribution to environmental protection in the region		2009
Mahathir Science Award (Note: "Daily Archives: August 4, 2009". Tropical Science Foundation. 4 August 2009.)		Contribution to the research and development of the country’s rubberwood industry		2009
Japanese International Award for Young Agricultural Researchers (Note: "Japan International Award for Young Agricultural Researchers (Japan Award)". 農林水產技術会議.)	Dr. Kevin Siong Ng (2009), Dr. Lee Hong TNAH (2013), Dr. Farah Fazwa Md Ariff (2018)			2009, 2013, 2018
BrandLaureate Awards (Note: "BESTBRANDS AWARD 2010-2011". The BrandLaureate.) (Note: "BESTBRANDS AWARD 2011-2012". The BrandLaureate.)		Best Brand in Forestry–Environment Conservation		2010-2011, 2011-2012
National Book Award				2010, 2012, 2013, 2016, 2019, 2022, 2023
Merdeka Award (Note: "2012 Merdeka Award Recipient Citations - Press Releases". Merdeka Award. 4 October 2012.)	Dr. Engkik Soepadmo			2012
Islamic Development Bank (IDB) Science and Technology Prize (Note: "FRIM RECEIVED IDB SCIENCE AND TECHNOLOGY PRIZE 2012 IN KHARTOUM, SUDAN". Ministry of Foreign affairs Malaysia. 5 April 2012.)				2012
National Innovation Award (Products Category)		High Temperature Drying system		2013
National Intellectual Property Award (Patent Category)		High Temperature Drying system		2014
Linnean Medal	Dr. Engkik Soepadmo	Botany		2015
Gold Award		Malaysia Biological Diversity CHM website	13th Meeting of the Conference of the Parties to the Convention on Biological Diversity in Cancun, Mexico	2016
Gold Medal		FRIM’s Aedes Bio-Based Fuel innovation	45th International Exhibition of Inventions of Geneva	2017
Special Green Innovation Award (from the Selangor Government)		FRIM’s Aedes Bio-Based Fuel innovation		2017
2018 Publishing Encouragement Scheme (CREAM) Award (High Impact Indexed Journal in Web of Science category)		Publishing the Journal of Tropical Forest Science		2018
ASEAN Books Award		Best research institution		2019
2021 UNESCO Sultan Qaboos Prize for Environmental Conservation (Note: "The Forest Research Institute Malaysia and the University for International Cooperation in Costa Rica to receive 2021 UNESCO Sultan Qaboos Prize for Environmental Conservation". UNESCO. 20 April 2023.)				2021

== Gallery ==
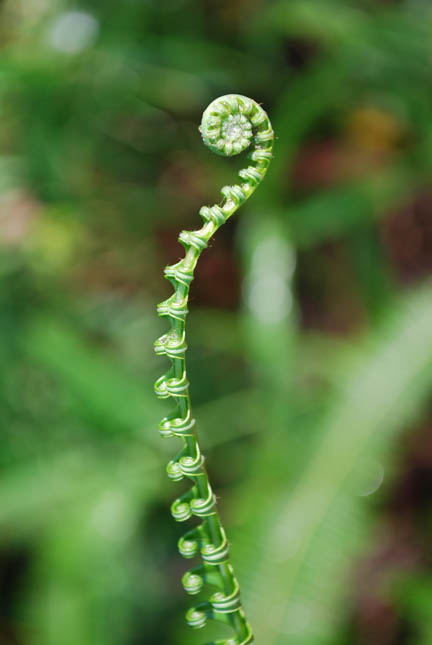
A fern plant (FRIM)

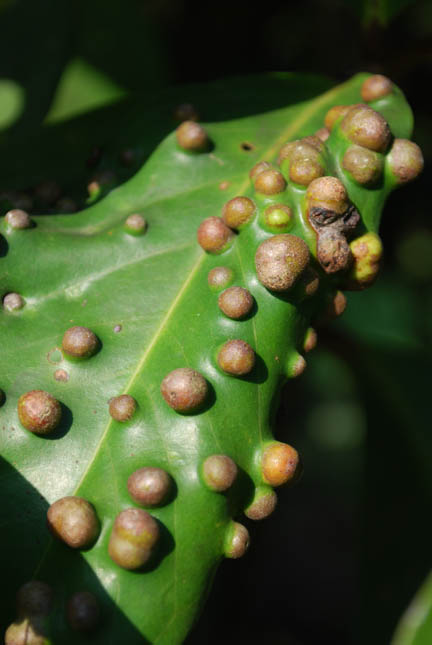
An infected leaf (FRIM)

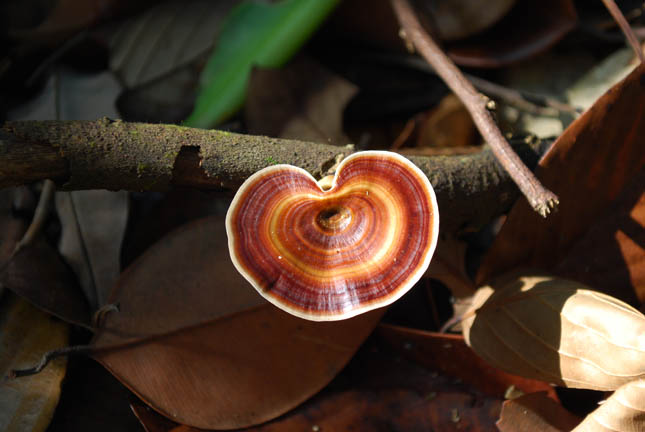
A fungus on the forest floor (FRIM)

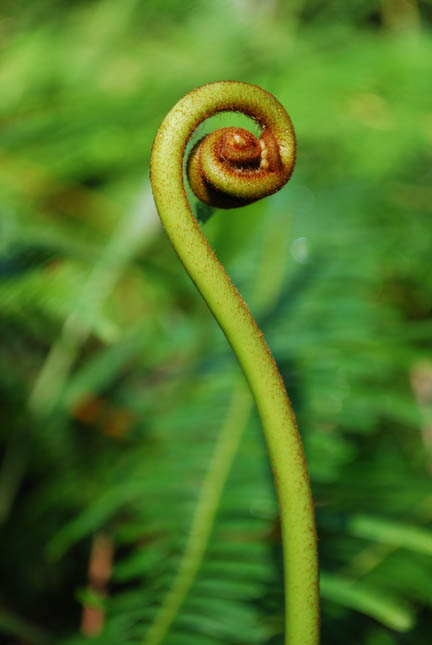
A fern frond (FRIM)

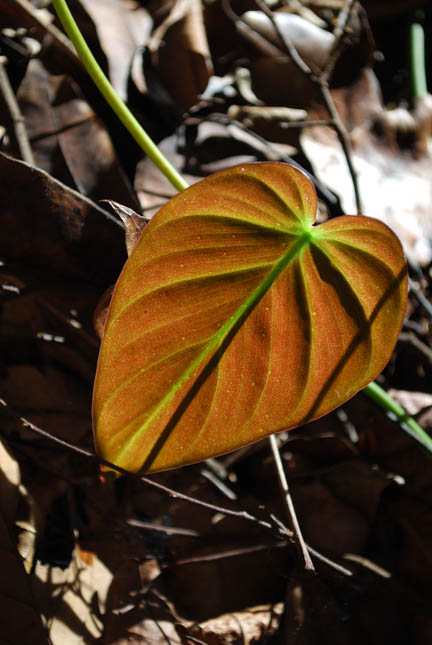
Life beneath the canopy trees (FRIM)

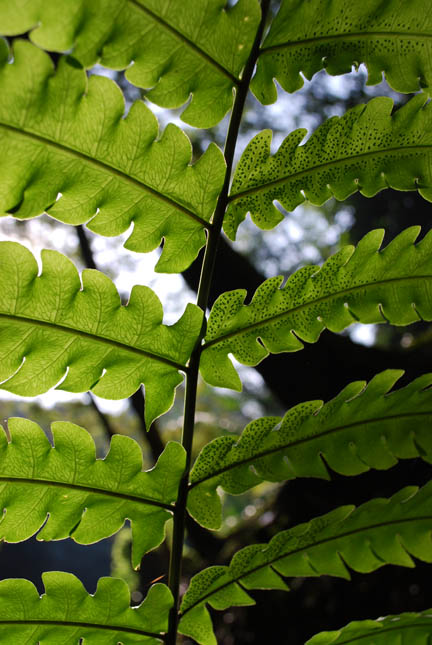
Veins of GREEN (FRIM)

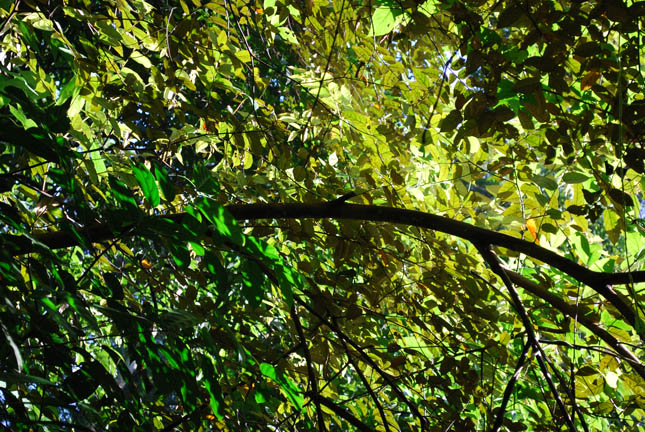
The GREEN Forest

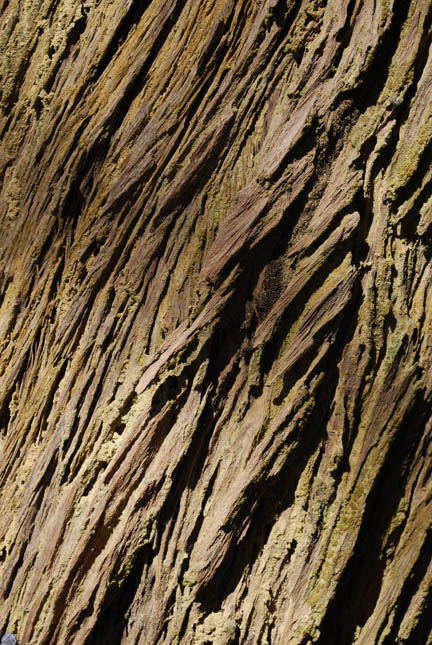
The tree bark
