= Nature Sites in Selangor =

Natural areas in Selangor, Malaysia

Selangor is the most developed state in Malaysia but it still retains approximately 30% of its land cover under natural forest. Several nature sites in Selangor are of particular interest for conservation and recreation.

Selangor, with an area of approximately 8,000 km^{2}, extends along the west coast of Peninsular Malaysia at the northern outlet of the Straits of Malacca. Its advantageous geographic position and rich natural resources have made Selangor the most prosperous state in Malaysia. Today it has the distinction of being the most populated state in Malaysia, with about 3.75 million inhabitants. A large proportion of Selangor's population lives around the Federal Territory of Kuala Lumpur, though the balance is now shifting towards its new capital, Shah Alam.

"Kuala Selangor Nature Park is situated at the mouth of Selangor River, in the state of Selangor, Malaysia. It covers approximately 800 acres of mangroves and mudflats and is the home to various wildlife such as otters, monkeys, birds, mudskippers and crabs." The Kuala Selangor Nature Park is managed by the Malaysian Nature Society, under a co-operative arrangement with the Selangor State Government.

Nature Site	Habitat Type	Size	Status	Importance	Threats	Priority (1-4)	Ref.
Sepang Mangroves	mangrove forest	1000 ha	Unprotected	Coastal buffer, marine habitat, corridor	Housing development, aquaculture	1 Important, Urgent	
Batu Caves	forest over limestone	155.8 ha	Unprotected	Endemic plants, animals	Quarrying, housing, cable car	2 Important, Not Urgent	
Selangor State Park	dipterocarp forest	100,000+ ha	Protected	Endemic plants, animals	highway development	2 Important, Not Urgent	
Kota Damansara Community Forest Park	lowland dipterocarp forest, freshwater swamp forest	300 ha	Protected	Endemic plants, animals	Housing, highways	2 Important, Not Urgent	
