= Mount Semangkok =

Mountain in Malaysia

- Location within Malaysia

Highest point
- Elevation: 1,825 m (5,988 ft)
- Prominence: 623 m (2,044 ft)
- Listing: Spesial Ribu
- Coordinates: 3°44′15″N 101°39′05″E

Naming
- Native name: Gunung Semangkok (Malay)

Geography
- Location: Hulu Selangor District, Selangor; Raub District, Pahang
- Parent range: Titiwangsa Mountains

Climbing
- Easiest route: hike

Mount Semangkok is a prominent mountain in Malaysia. It reaches a height of 1,830 meters (6,004 feet). The peak marks the border between two states, Pahang and Selangor. This mountain holds the distinction of being Selangor's highest point. Its location is very near Fraser's Hill, a popular highland resort. This proximity makes it easily accessible for visitors. The area is known for its cool climate and lush greenery. The mountain and surrounding region offer opportunities for hiking. Nature lovers are often drawn to the area's scenic beauty. The trails offer different levels of challenge. Views from the summit are expansive.
