= Selangor =

State of Malaysia

- State
- State of Selangor; Negeri Selangor (Malay)
- Flag Coat of arms
- Nicknames: Darul Ehsan "Abode of Sincerity"; Negeri Emas Malaysia "Golden State of Malaysia"
- Motto: Dipelihara Allah "By God's Protection"
- Anthem: Duli Yang Maha Mulia "Your Royal Highness"
- Selangor in Malaysia
- Country: Malaysia
- Establishment: 1766
- Federated into FMS: 1895
- Japanese occupation: 19 December 1941 – 3 September 1945
- Malayan Union: 1 April 1946
- Federation of Malaya: 31 August 1957
- Proclamation of Malaysia: 16 September 1963
- Capital: Shah Alam; 3°20′N 101°30′E
- Royal capital: Klang
- Largest city: Petaling Jaya
- Ethnic groups (2020): 55.70% Bumiputera; 25.11% Chinese; 10.38% Indian; 0.75% Other ethnicities; 8.06% Non-citizens
- Religion (2020): 61.1% Sunni Islam (official); 21.6% Buddhism; 10.3% Hinduism; 4.9% Christianity; 1.3% Other religions; 0.8% No religion
- Demonym(s): Selangorean / Selangorian
- Government: Federated parliamentary constitutional monarchy
  - Sultan: Sharafuddin
  - Menteri Besar: Amirudin Shari (PH–PKR)
- Legislature: Legislative Assembly

Area
  - Total: 8,104 km^{2} (3,129 sq mi) (9th)
- Elevation: 90 m (300 ft)
- Highest elevation (Mount Semangkok): 1,830 m (6,000 ft)

Population
  - 2020 census: 6,994,423
  - Density: 880/km^{2} (2,279.2/sq mi) (5th)
- GDP (PPP): 2025 estimate
  - Total: $388,458 million (1st)
  - Per capita: $51,736 (5th)
- GDP (nominal): 2025 estimate
  - Total: $123,435 million (1st)
  - Per capita: $16,440 (5th)
- Gini (2022): ▼0.361 low
- HDI (2024): ▲0.856 very high · 3rd
- Currency: Malaysian ringgit (RM/MYR)
- Time zone: UTC+8 (Malaysian Time)
- Date format: dd-mm-yyyy
- Driving side: Left
- Calling code: 03
- Postal code: 40xxx to 48xxx, 63xxx, 640xx, 68xxx
- ISO 3166 code: MY-10
- Website: www.selangor.gov.my

Selangor (/səˈlæŋər/ sə-LANG-ər; Malay: [s(ə)ˈlaŋo(r)]), also known by the Arabic honorific Darul Ehsan (lit. 'Abode of Sincerity'), is a state of Malaysia. It is on the west coast of Peninsular Malaysia and is bordered by Perak to the north, Pahang to the east, Negeri Sembilan to the south, and the Strait of Malacca to the west. Selangor surrounds the federal territories of Kuala Lumpur and Putrajaya, both of which were previously part of it. Selangor has diverse tropical rainforests and an equatorial climate. The state's mountain ranges belong to the Titiwangsa Mountains, which is part of the Tenasserim Hills that covers southern Myanmar, southern Thailand and Peninsular Malaysia, with Mount Semangkok as the highest point in the state.

The state capital of Selangor is Shah Alam, and its royal capital is Klang, Kajang is the largest municipality by total metropolitan population and Petaling Jaya is the largest municipality by total population within the city. Petaling Jaya and Subang Jaya received city status in 2006 and 2019, respectively. Selangor is one of four Malaysian states that contain more than one city with official city status; the others are Sarawak, Johor, and Penang.

The state of Selangor has the largest economy in Malaysia in terms of gross domestic product (GDP), with RM 384 billion (roughly $82 billion) in 2022, comprising 25.6% of the country's GDP. It is the most developed state in Malaysia; it has well-developed infrastructure, such as highways and transport, and has the largest population in Malaysia. It also has a high standard of living and the lowest poverty rate in the country.

== Etymology ==
The origin of the name Selangor is uncertain. A common suggestion is that the name refers to the Malay word langau, a large fly or blowfly that is found in the marshes along the Selangor River (Sungai Selangor) in the state's north-west. According to local lore, a warrior who escaped from Malacca after the Portuguese conquest, took a break from his journey north and rested under a tree here. However, he was disturbed by a persistent fly, whereupon he decided to explore the area. When he found the place to his liking and chose to settle there, he named the place "satu (se) langau" meaning "a large blowfly".

In the absence of a firm etymological explanation, alternative theories abound. One suggestion is that the name may have originated from a kind of tree found in Kuala Selangor and along Selangor River named mentangau. Another theory claims the state's name is derived from the term Salang Ur where ur means "town" or "village" in Tamil, meaning village of the Salang people. It has also been proposed that the name is derived from a combination of salang (stabbing) and jemur (dry in the sun), indicating that it was once a place where traitors were stabbed (salang) then left to roast in the sun (jemur).

== History ==
Historical affiliations	Period
Malacca Sultanate	1400–1511
Johor Sultanate	1528–1765
Selangor Sultanate	1766–present
Federated Malay States	1895–1941
Empire of Japan	1941–1945
Malayan Union	1946–1948
Federation of Malaya	1948–1963
Malaysia	1963–present

The most important settlement of the area in the ancient period may have been Klang. Ancient artefacts including Bronze Age axes and a bronze bell dating from the 2nd century BC, and iron tools called "tulang mawas" ("ape bones") have been found in or near Klang. The Mao Kun map dating to the Ming dynasty and used by the Admiral Zheng He during his expeditions between 1405 and 1433 refers to places in Selangor such as the Klang River estuary (吉令港) and perhaps a hilly area. The Malay Annals indicate that the Selangor area was under the control of the Sultanate of Malacca in the 15th century; however, Selangor at that time was not a unified domain—separate river states such as Klang and Jeram existed in the region. According to the Malay Annals, Tun Perak was appointed the chief of Klang during the reign of Muzaffar Shah. Later, Paduka Sri Cina, the son of Mansur Shah and Hang Li Po was made raja of Jeram near Langat, which may be due to the presence of Chinese miners there.

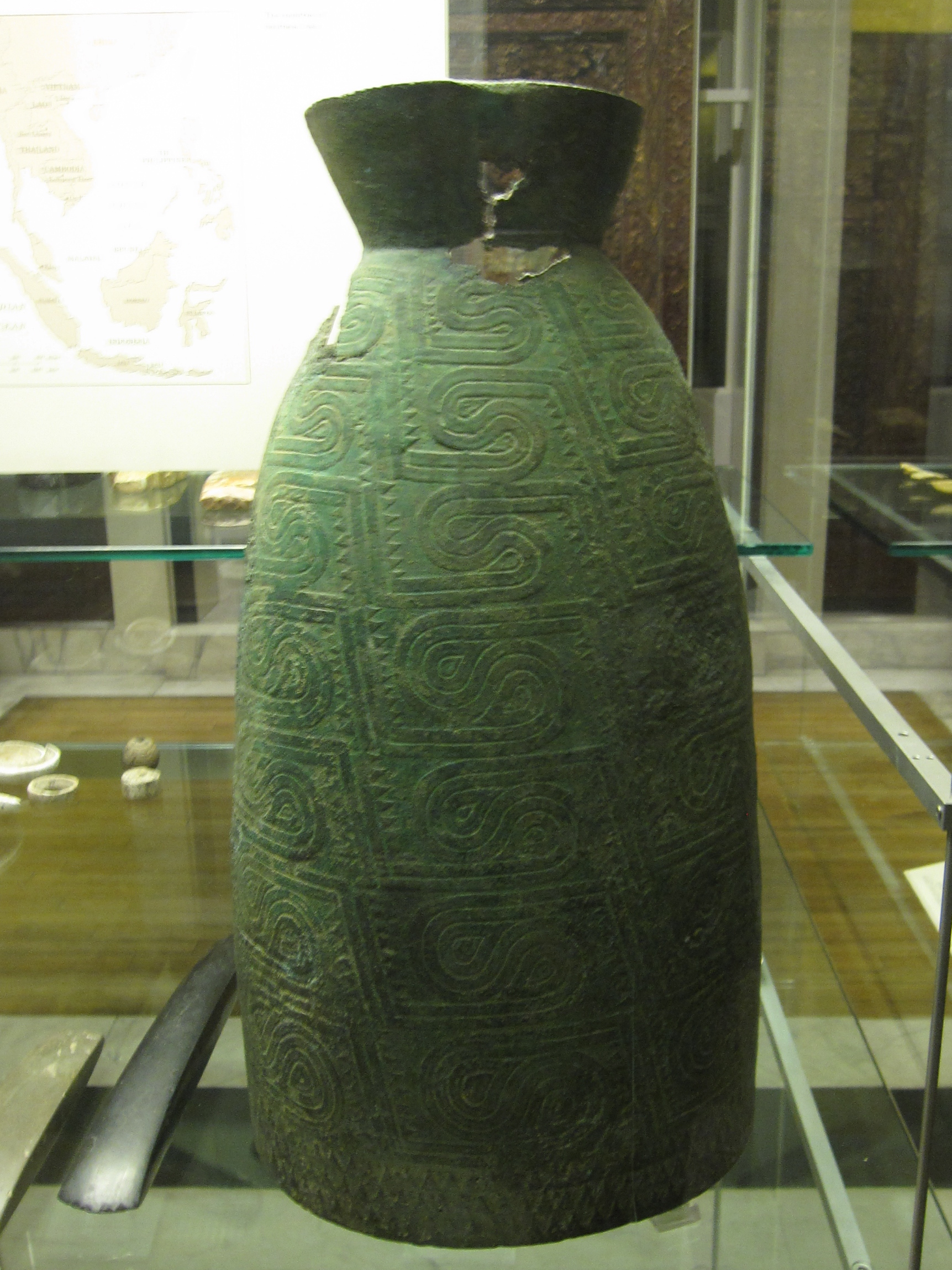
The Klang Bell, dated 200 BC – 200 AD

After the fall of Malacca to the Portuguese in 1511, the area came under the control of Johor Sultanate and was later governed by Sri Agar Diraja, son of the Bendahara family of Johor. In the 17th century, Johor was involved in a war against Jambi, and the Sultan of Johor engaged the help of Bugis mercenaries from Sulawesi to fight against Jambi. After Johor won, the Bugis stayed and started to gain power in the region. Initially there were only a few hundred Bugis who settled in the estuaries of the Selangor and Klang rivers as well as Linggi further south in the early 17th century, later when the Bugis had gained position of influence in Johor (the Bugis were given the position of Yam Tuan Muda having helped repel an attack from Siak), much larger number settled in Selangor by 1723. The most prominent of the Bugis were a group of five brothers. Some Minangkabaus, who mainly settled in Negeri Sembilan, may have also settled in Selangor by the 17th century, perhaps earlier. The Bugis and the Minangkabaus from Sumatra struggled for control of Johor; Raja Kecil, backed by the Minangkabaus, invaded but were driven off by the Bugis. In order to establish a power base, Raja Salehuddin, the son of Daeng Chelak (one of the five Bugis brothers) became Tengku Raja Selangor and founded the present hereditary Selangor Sultanate with its capital at Kuala Selangor in 1766. Selangor is unique as the only state on the Malay Peninsula that was founded by the Bugis.

In the 19th century, the economy of Selangor boomed due to the exploitation of its tin reserves; mining occurred in various parts of Selangor, for example in Ampang, that led to the growth of Kuala Lumpur. In 1854, the Sultan of Selangor granted Raja Abdullah control of Klang, passing over Raja Mahadi, the son of the chief who previously ruled Klang, which led to the Selangor Civil War fought between 1867 and 1874. The war between the Malay factions was also partly a struggle for control of the tin revenue. Tin mining had attracted a large number of Chinese migrant labourers, and Chinese clans allied with Selangor chiefs also joined the civil war. The conflicts between Malay and Chinese factions in Perak and Selangor, as well as concerns over piracy that affected coastal trade, led to increasing British involvement in the affairs of the Malay states.

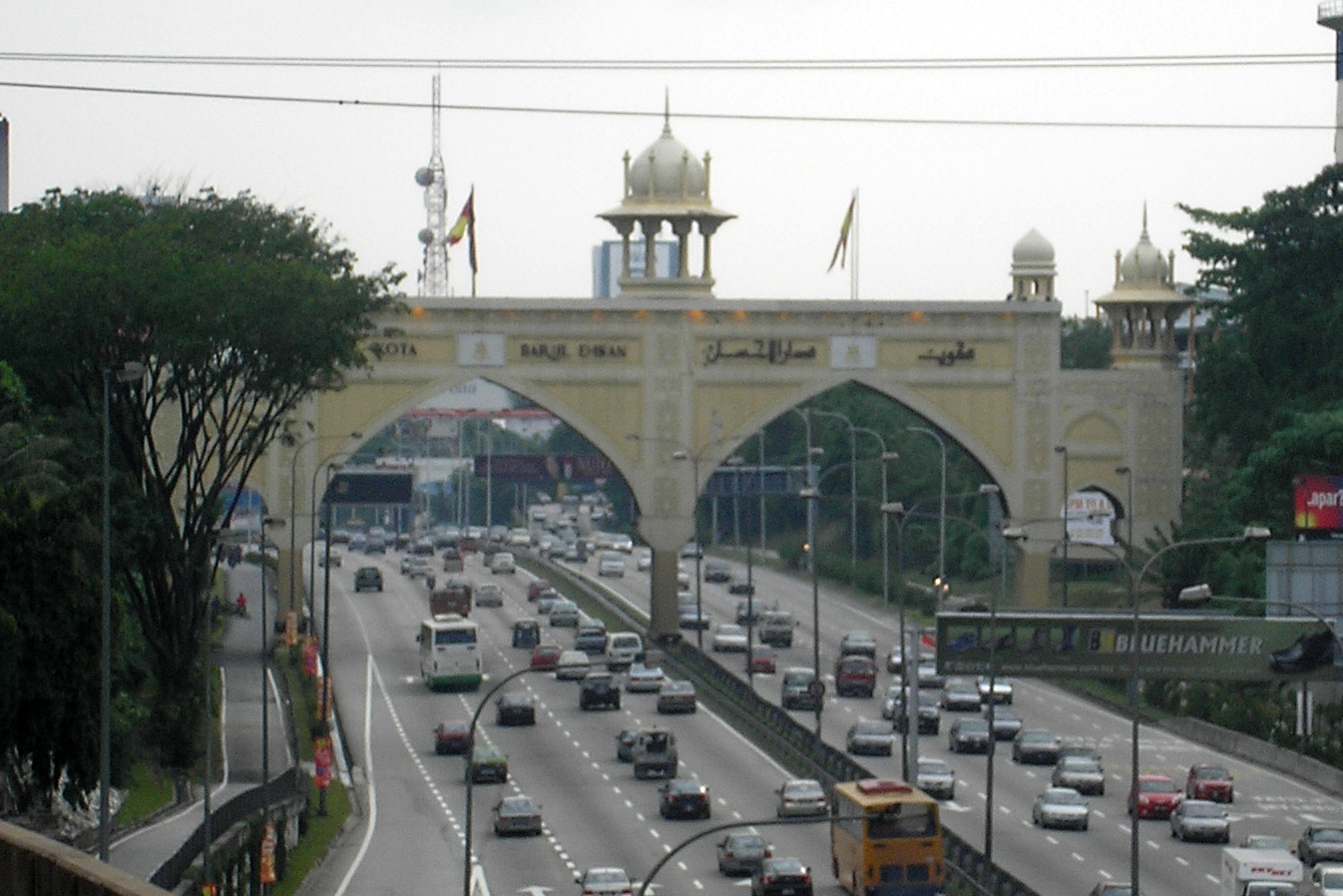
The Kota Darul Ehsan arch over the Federal Highway, which was built to commemorate the cession of Kuala Lumpur by Selangor to the federal government to form a Federal Territory

In 1874, Sultan Abdul Samad of Selangor accepted a British Resident in a system that allowed the British to govern while the Sultan remained the apparent ruler. Klang was the capital of the British colonial administration of Selangor from 1875 until 1880 when it was moved to Kuala Lumpur. Under the stability imposed by the British, Selangor again prospered. In 1896, largely through the coordination of the Resident Frank Swettenham, Selangor united with Negeri Sembilan, Perak and Pahang to form the Federated Malay States, with Kuala Lumpur as its capital.

The Federated Malay States evolved into the Federation of Malaya in 1948, which became independent in 1957. The federation became known as Malaysia in 1963, when its existing states federated with the other British colonies of Sarawak, North Borneo and Singapore. The city of Kuala Lumpur functioned as the national capital of Malaysia and as the state capital of Selangor. In 1974, Selangor relinquished Kuala Lumpur to the federal government. The Sultan of Selangor commemorated the city's transfer by building an archway on the borders of the new Federal Territory and Selangor; this archway is the Kota Darul Ehsan that straddles a section of the Federal Highway between Bangsar and Petaling Jaya. The state capital was moved to Shah Alam after the cession.

Putrajaya, a new city designed to be the new administrative capital of Malaysia, was built by the federal government in Selangor; Sultan Salahuddin was asked again to cede land to the federal government. Putrajaya became a federal territory in 2001.

== Geography ==
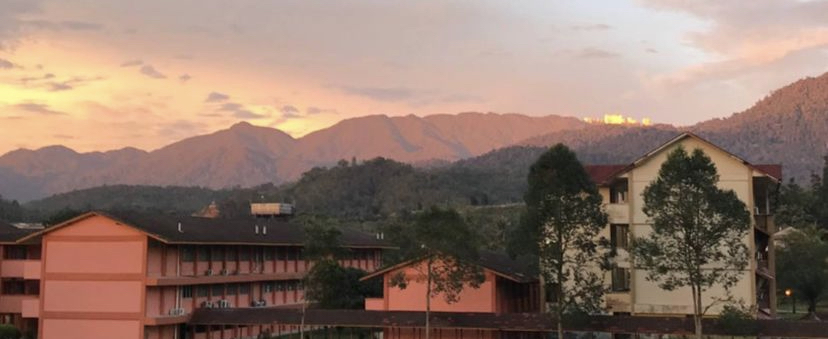
The Titiwangsa Mountains in Ulu Yam

Selangor, with an area of approximately 8,000 km^{2}, extends to the west coast of Peninsular Malaysia. The state is bordered north by Bernam River from Perak, south by Sepang River from Negeri Sembilan, east and southeast by the Titiwangsa Mountains from Pahang and Negeri Sembilan and the Strait of Malacca on the west, and surrounds the Federal Territories of Kuala Lumpur and Putrajaya.

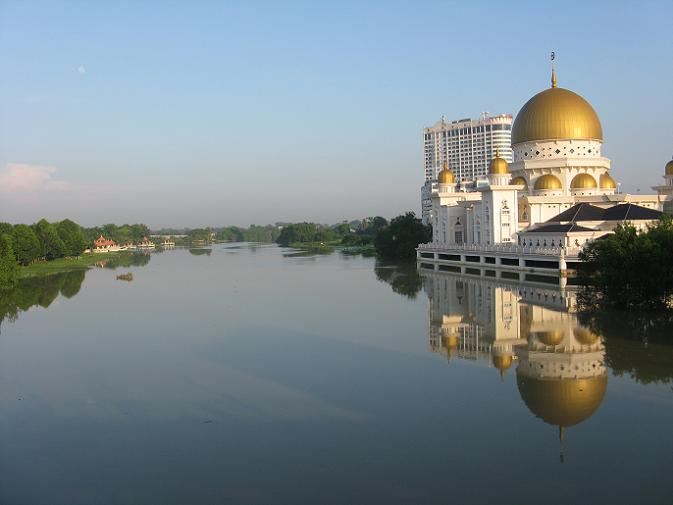
Klang River, Klang

Topographically wise, Selangor is relatively level out near the coast and gradually becomes more hilly and mountainous towards the east. The hill and mountain, surrounding the eastern and central portion of the state effectively forming a valley and a drainage basin of the Klang River, known as the Klang Valley, where most of the population are centered. The Klang Valley is often synonymously associated with another toponym, Greater Kuala Lumpur, though both terms vary between each other. Being one of the most heavily urbanised regions in Malaysia and Southeast Asia, cities that make up Klang Valley include the state and royal capitals of Shah Alam and Klang, as well as the federal capital, Kuala Lumpur, which is strategically situated in the heart of the state. It was once part of Selangor territory before it was ceded to the federal government in 1974 to form a Federal Territory. It was then followed by the 1995 cession of Prang Besar of Sepang District to the federal government, which became what is now the nation's administrative and judicial capital Putrajaya.

Selangor is divided into nine districts namely Sabak Bernam, Kuala Selangor, Hulu Selangor, Gombak, Petaling, Klang, Kuala Langat, Hulu Langat and Sepang.

=== Flora and Fauna ===
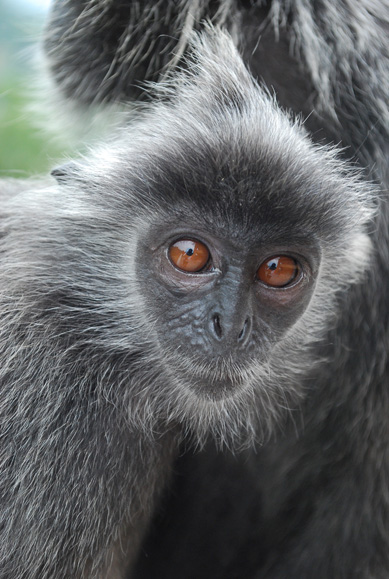
Silver Leaf Monkey in Bukit Melawati

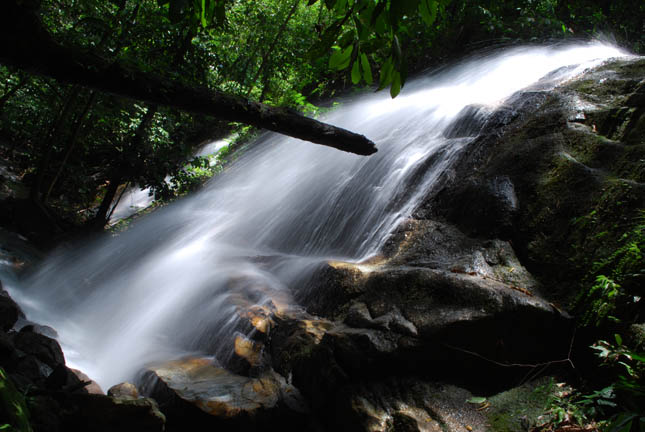
Commonwealth Forest Park

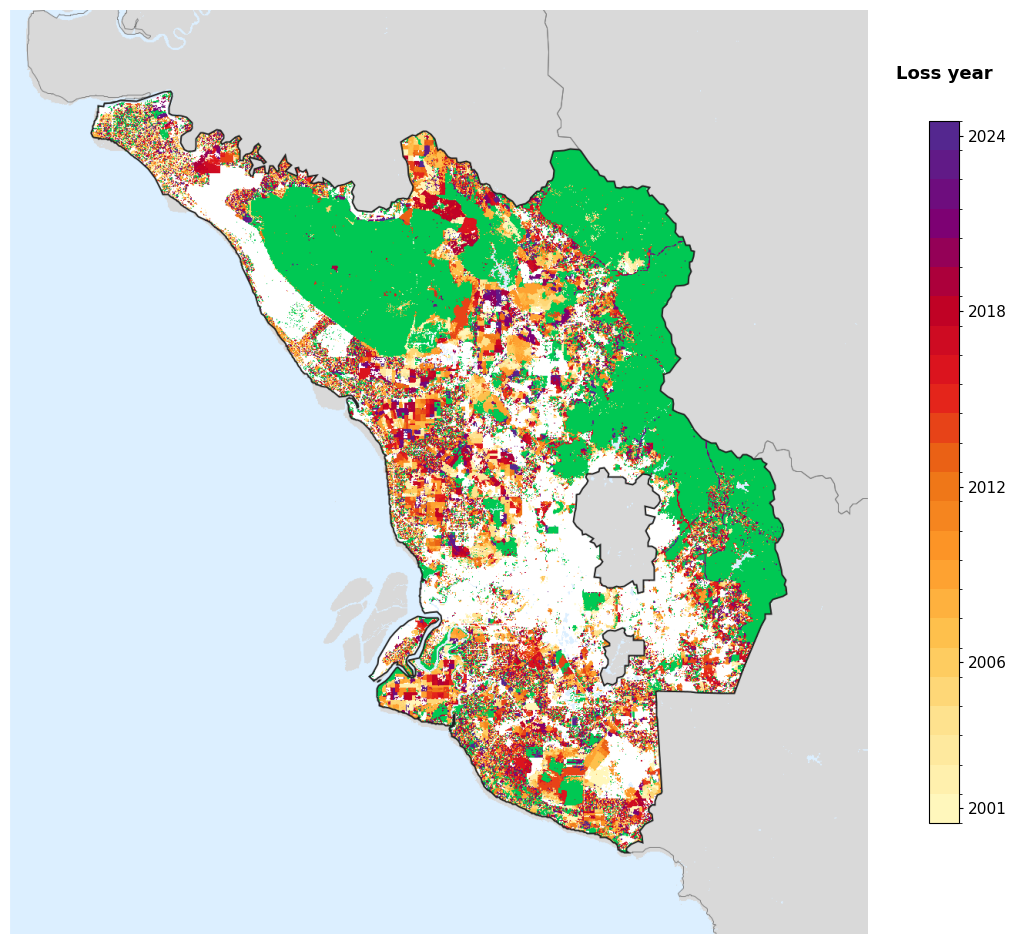
Tree-cover loss year in Selangor, 2001-2024, from the Global Forest Change dataset

Malaysian forest can be classified as tropical rainforest. Selangor has 250,129 ha of permanent reserve forest, of which 82,890 ha are peat swamp forest and 18,998 ha formed mangrove forest along the coast. The permanent reserve forest makes up about 32 per cent of the state land. Forest parks that are situated in Selangor include Gabai Waterfall, Taman Rimba Templer, Taman Rimba Ampang, Taman Rimba Komanwel, Sungai Chongkak, Sungai Tua, Sungai Sendat, Sungai Tekala, Kanching, Gunung Nuang and Bukit Tabur. Reserved forests in Selangor are managed and conserved by the state's forestry department, as the Constitution of Malaysia provides that forestry comes under the jurisdiction of the respective states. Selangor's forestry headquarters is located at the Sultan Salahuddin Abdul Aziz Shah Building, in Shah Alam.

Selangor is also home to a statutory agency of the Government of Malaysia, the Forest Research Institute Malaysia (FRIM). Located in Kepong, FRIM promotes sustainable management and optimal use of forest resources in Malaysia by generating knowledge and technology through research, development and application in tropical forestry.

Selangor has a few declared protected areas (PAs) in order to safeguard biodiversity and wildlife. They are Sungai Dusun Wildlife Reserve which was created to protect the now-extirpated Sumatran Rhinos, Kutu Hill Wildlife Reserve, and Bukit Sungai Puteh Hill Wildlife Reserve which is located at Kuala Lumpur and Selangor's border. The state also has an ecotourism centre, Paya Indah Wetlands, which is located in the district Kuala Langat near Dengkil. It is a sanctuary to migratory and residential birds, introduced Nile hippos and crocodiles.

Several Nature Sites in Selangor are at risk from development. These include Shah Alam Community Forest which is being cleared for housing, roads and a cemetery. Similarly, Bukit Lagong forest reserve is at risk from quarrying and housing development. Another threat is development for tourism such as has been proposed for Kuala Selangor Nature Park.

=== Climate ===
Climate data for Selangor (LTSAAS) in 2017
Month	Jan	Feb	Mar	Apr	May	Jun	Jul	Aug	Sep	Oct	Nov	Dec	Year
Mean daily maximum °C (°F)	34 (93)	35 (95)	36 (97)	36 (97)	36 (97)	37 (99)	36 (97)	36 (97)	32 (90)	32 (90)	30 (86)	31 (88)	34 (94)
Daily mean °C (°F)	31 (88)	32 (90)	32 (90)	33 (91)	33 (91)	34 (93)	33 (91)	33 (91)	30 (86)	30 (86)	28 (82)	29 (84)	32 (89)
Mean daily minimum °C (°F)	26 (79)	26 (79)	27 (81)	27 (81)	28 (82)	27 (81)	27 (81)	27 (81)	26 (79)	26 (79)	26 (79)	25 (77)	27 (80)
Average rainfall mm (inches)	482.5 (19.00)	296.2 (11.66)	307.7 (12.11)	289.0 (11.38)	232.2 (9.14)	127.1 (5.00)	127.4 (5.02)	213.8 (8.42)	232.7 (9.16)	102.2 (4.02)	366.7 (14.44)	319.9 (12.59)	3,097.4 (121.94)
Average rainy days (≥ 1.0mm)	28	28	31	27	31	24	29	31	24	21	30	31	335
Average relative humidity (%) (daily average)	78	78	77	76	75	72	71	74	75	72	82	79	76
Mean monthly sunshine hours	236.5	255.0	290.0	271.0	280.5	266.5	283.5	277.0	268.5	266.0	163.0	225.0	3,082.5

As in the rest of Malaysia, Selangor has a tropical rainforest climate (Köppen climate classification Af) bordering on a tropical monsoon climate. The climate is very much dictated by the surrounding sea and the prevailing wind system. It has high average temperature and high average rainfall.

== Demographics ==
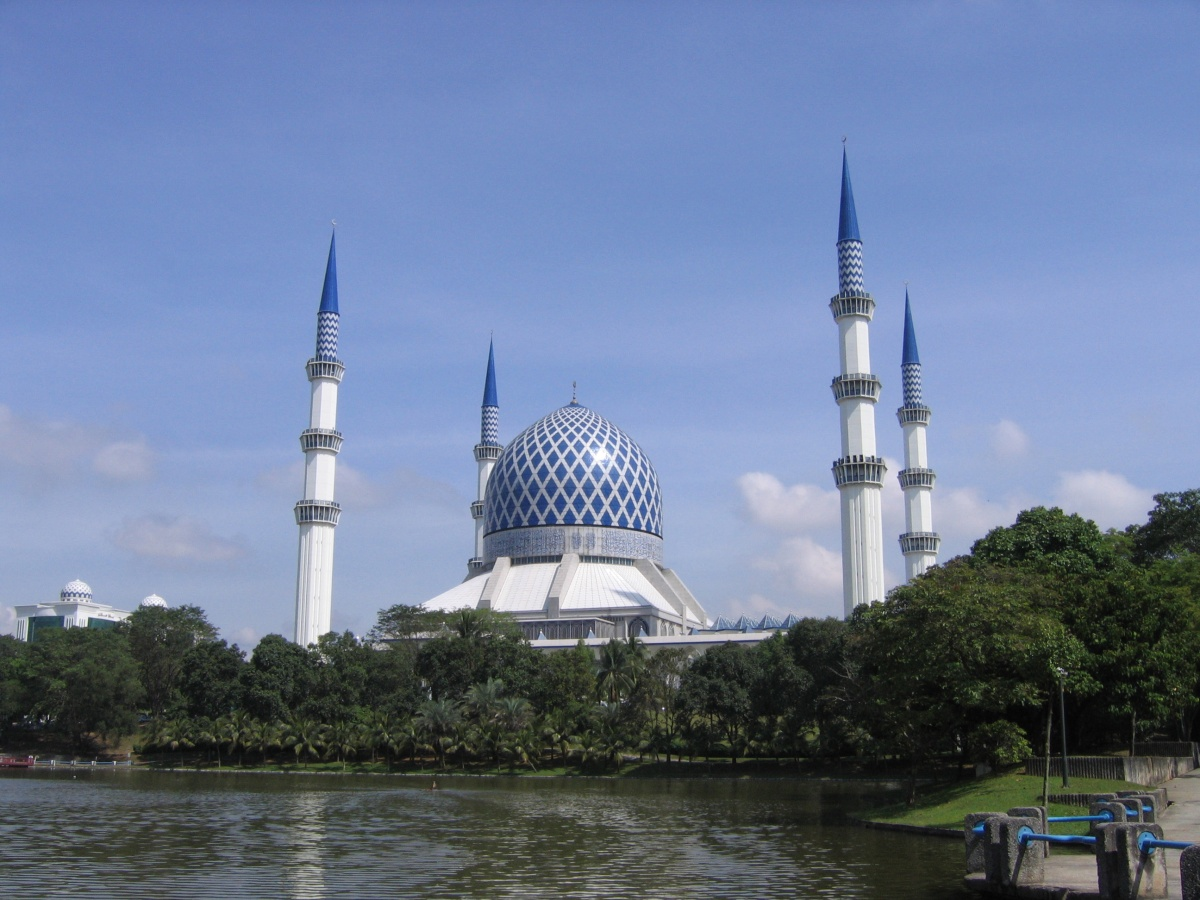
Sultan Salahuddin Abdul Aziz Mosque or Blue Mosque in Shah Alam, Selangor, Malaysia

Historical population
Year	Pop.	±%
1957	1,012,900	—
1970	1,630,366	+61.0%
1980	1,426,250	−12.5%
1991	2,297,159	+61.1%
2000	3,952,817	+72.1%
2010	5,345,454	+35.2%
2015	5,462,141	+2.2%
2020	6,994,423	+28.1%
Kuala Lumpur split off in 1974, and Putrajaya in 2001. Source:

Selangor is Malaysia's most populous state; it has the nation's biggest conurbation, the Klang Valley. Selangor's geographical position in the centre of Peninsular Malaysia contributed to the state's rapid development as Malaysia's transportation and industrial hub, creating jobs and attracting migrants from other states and from other Asian countries, especially Indonesia, the Philippines, Vietnam, Myanmar, Bangladesh, India, Pakistan and China.

Selangor's population has increased considerably in recent decades, due mostly to the development of the Klang Valley. The population was 1,426,250 in 1980, and by 2000 it had grown to 3,941,316. and further increased to 5,482,141 in 2010. Its population was 5,874,100 in 2015, and reached 6,994,423 according to the 2020 census.

=== Ethnic groups in Selangor ===
Race Population in Selangor, 1990–2026
Race	Malay	Other Bumiputera	Chinese	Indian	Others	Total
1990	1,195,300 (51%)	-	750,200 (32%)	382,300 (16.3%)	17,500 (0.8%)	2,345,300
2000	2,087,200 (52.2%)	55,300 (1.4%)	1,230,300 (30.7%)	585,400 (14.6%)	44,400 (1.1%)	4,002,600
2010	2,817,300 (55.8%)	70,800 (1.4%)	1,449,600 (28.7%)	680,700 (13.5%)	34,300 (0.7%)	5,052,700
2020	3,806,200 (59.2%)	89,700 (1.4%)	1,756,200 (27.3%)	726,000 (11.3%)	52,400 (0.8%)	6,430,500
2025	4,041,700 (60.5%)	86,800 (1.3%)	1,758,800 (26.3%)	730,900 (10.9%)	58,800 (0.9%)	6,677,000

The traditional culture of Selangor's Malay majority is also influenced by those of Bugis, Minangkabau, Mandailing, Javanese, and Banjarese ancestry; most of whom are Muslims. Javanese ancestry are dominant in west coast districts such as Sabak Bernam, Kuala Selangor, Klang, Kuala Langat and Sepang. Whereas Minangkabau descent are dominant in Gombak and Hulu Selangor. Selangor's population also includes ethnic Chinese and Indian influences; those two groups form the largest minority populations. The 3,000 Mah Meri people, part of the Orang Asli—the indigenous peoples of the Peninsula—can be found on Carey Island and maintain their culture and language while adapting to the modern way of life. With its advanced state of development, Selangor has more international ties through trade, business and education than other rural states.

=== Religion ===
Religion in Selangor - 2020 Census
religion	percent
Islam	61.1%
Buddhism	21.6%
Hinduism	10.3%
Christianity	4.9%
No religion	0.8%
Others	1.3%

According to the 2020 census, the population of Selangor is 61.1% Muslim, 21.6% Buddhist, 10.3% Hindu, 5.0% Christian/Catholic, 1% of unknown affiliations, 0.5% adherent of Taoism or Chinese religion, 0.4% follower of other religions and 0.4% non-religious. All Malays (52.24% of Selangor's population in 2020) are necessarily Muslims because the definition of a Malay in the Malaysian constitution requires Malays to profess the religion of Islam.

== Governance and politics ==
The state is a hereditary constitutional monarchy, of which the reigning Sultan since 2001 is Sultan Sharafuddin Idris Shah. Since 19 June 2018, the Menteri Besar (chief executive of the state government) is Amirudin Shari, of the People's Justice Party (PKR) a component party of Pakatan Harapan (before, Pakatan Rakyat).

=== Constitution ===
Consisting of 19 chapters and 107 articles, the Constitution of the State of Selangor is the highest form of law in the state. It came into force on 26 February 1959 and was separated into two parts. Under the 1959 constitution, Selangor is a constitutional monarchy.

=== Selangor Sultanate ===
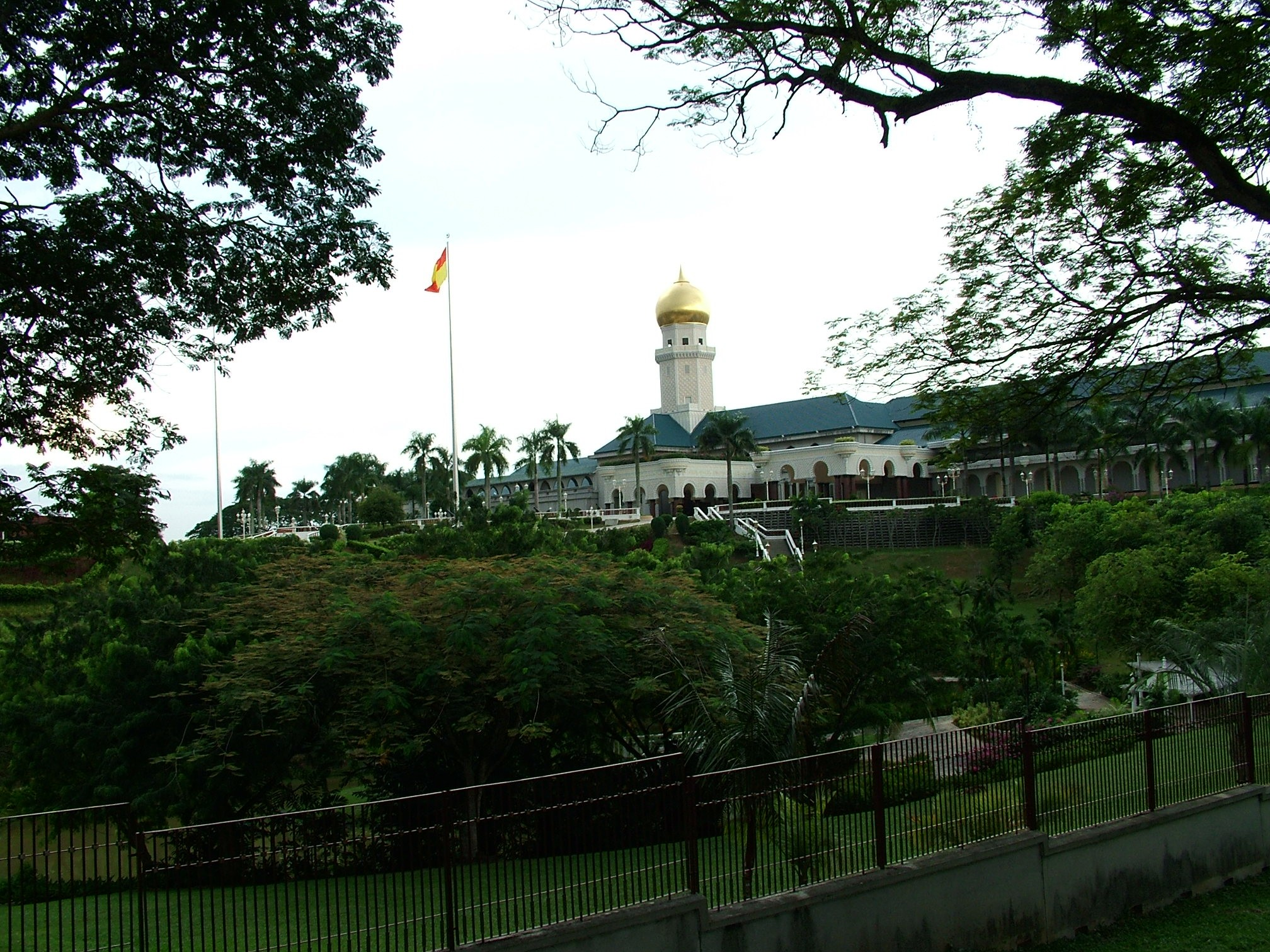
The palace of the Sultan of Selangor in Klang

The Sultan of Selangor is the constitutional Ruler of Selangor. The role, powers, and duties of the Sultan are set forth in the 1959 constitution, which proclaims that the office of Sultan is vested with the executive power of the state, are the head of the religion of Islam in the state and the "fountain of honours and dignities" in the state. This position is hereditary and can only be held by a member of Selangor's royal family. The current ruler is His Royal Highness Sultan Sharafuddin Idris Shah, who has held this position since 2001.

=== State Executive Council ===
The State Executive Council, which along with the Sultan is Selangor's executive branch of government, was established by the constitution of 1959. It is composed of the Menteri Besar—who is its chairman and Selangor's head of government—and ten other members; all of whom are appointed by the Sultan of Selangor from members of the State Assembly. The current Menteri Besar is Yang Amat Berhormat Dato' Menteri Besar Amirudin Shari.

=== Legislature ===
The state also has a legislative branch, called the Selangor State Assembly. It is similar to the Parliament but is limited to making laws relating to the state. Its members are elected, usually simultaneously with federal elections. The term of each state assembly member is limited to five years. The state assembly must be dissolved before or once it expires its term for a fresh election of its members.

Affiliation	Coalition/Party Leader	Status	Seats	
Affiliation	Coalition/Party Leader	Status	2023 election	Current
Pakatan Harapan; Barisan Nasional	Amirudin Shari	Government	34	35
Perikatan Nasional	Azmin Ali	Opposition	22	21
Government majority			12	13

=== List of districts ===
Administrative districts of Selangor.

Number	Name	Population 2010 Census	Area (km^{2})	Sub-districts	Note
1	Gombak	682,226	650.08	Ulu Klang, Ampang, Setapak, Batu Caves, Selayang, Rawang, Taman Templer, Sungai Buloh, Kundang, Batu 20, Kampung Sungai Pusu	The meaning of Gombak is unknown but it is believed that the name comes from a village in Setapak called gombak (Gombak Setia). The district was created on 1 February 1974, the same day when Kuala Lumpur was declared a Federal Territory. Gombak is one of the few districts that has many cities and all of its sub-districts are cities except Batu 20, Kampung Sungai Pusu, and Setapak. Popular tourism places include Zoo Negara, Batu Caves, and Forest Research Institute Malaysia.
2	Hulu Langat	1,156,585	829.44	Kajang, Beranang, Cheras, Hulu Langat, Hulu Semenyih, Kelanang, Tanjong 12, Tarun, Sungai Makau, Sungai Lui, Sungai Kembong Beranang, Sri nanding, Simpang Balak, Rumah Murah Sungai Lui, Kampung Sungai Tangkas, Kacau, Kampung Pasir Batu 14 Semenyih, Desa Raya, Sungai Raya, Batu 26, Batu 23.	The name Hulu Langat means the beginning of Langat River. Hulu Langat has many major cities which are mostly located in the north of the district, such as Cheras and Kajang. Popular tourism places includes Sungai Congkak Recreational Forest and Gabai River.
3	Hulu Selangor	198,132	1,740.46	Kuala Kubu Bharu, Sungai Chick, Ulu Yam, Ulu Yam Baru, Kerling, Kuala Kalumpang, Sungai Gumut, Serendah, Peretak, Sungai Choh, Bukit Beruntung, Bukit Sentosa	The name Hulu Selangor means the beginning of river of selangor. Hulu Selangor have a city but majority of the settlements in the district are villages. The district is still largely covered with forests. Popular tourism places include Bukit Kutu, and Kerling Hot Spring.
4	Klang	861,189	626.78	Klang, Kapar, Bukit Raja, Port Klang, Pandamaran, Telok Menegun, Taman Sri Muda, Kota Kemuning, Bukit Kemuning, Batu 4.	The origin of the Klang name is unknown. The Royal Town of Klang, which is also the former capital of the state. Port Klang played a major role in Malaysia economy. There are many popular tourist hotspots in the district, such as Istana Alam Shah, Klang Royal Town Mosque, Sultan Abdul Aziz Royal Gallery, Tanjung Harapan, Pulau Ketam and Little India.
5	Kuala Langat	224,648	858	Bandar Saujana Putra, Jenjarom, Kanchong Darat, Sijangkang, Tongkah, Teluk Datok, Telok, Sungai Raba, Morib, Permatang Pasir, Kelanang Batu 6, Kanchong, Chodoi, Bukit Changgang, Batu, Jugra	Kuala Langat name derives from the combination of the word "Kuala" (river confluence) and Langat (from the Langat River).
6	Kuala Selangor	209,590	1,194.52	Api-api, Kuala Selangor, Bukit Melawati, Ijok, Kampung Kuantan, Kuala Sungai Buloh, Pasangan, Ulu Tinggi, Ujong Permatang, Tambak Jawa, Taman PKNS, Sungai Sembilang, Simpang 3 Ijok, Pasir Penambang, Simpang 3, Parit Mahang, Kg. Baru Hulu Tiram Buruk, Bukit Talang, Bukit Belimbing.	The word "Kuala" means the meeting between two or more rivers while the word Selangor comes from the name of the river located in the district, Selangor River. The combination of two words generates the name Kuala Selangor. Popular place to visit includes Bukit Melawati, Kuala Selangor Nature Park and Kampung Kuantan Fireflies.
7	Petaling	1,812,633	484.32	Petaling Jaya, Subang Jaya, Shah Alam, Damansara, Bandar Sri Damansara, Country Heights, Puchong, Puchong Jaya, Puchong Perdana, Batu Tiga, Sungai Besi, Serdang, Glenmarie, Penaga, Merbau Sempak, Kayu Ara, Desa Puchong.	The name Petaling comes from an extinct species of tree called Petaling. Petaling has many major cities such as Petaling Jaya, Shah Alam, and Subang Jaya. Popular tourism places include Sultan Salahuddin Abdul Aziz Mosque, Bandar Sunway, and 1 Utama
8	Sabak Bernam	105,777	997.1	Sabak, Sungai Besar, Sekinchan.	The name Sabak Bernam comes from the story that this place is opened by six friends (Malay : Sahabat berenam). Sabak Bernam main economic activity is agriculture and it is popular for its paddy fields especially in Sekinchan.
9	Sepang	211,361	599.66	Puchong, Bukit Puchong 2, 16 Sierra, Taman Putra Prima, Taman Mas, Taman Putra Perdana, Taman Meranti Jaya, Pulau Meranti, Cyberjaya, Dengkil, Beranang, Salak Tinggi.	The name Sepang is taken from a tree called Sepang. Popular tourism places include Sepang International Circuit, Kuala Lumpur International Airport and Cyberjaya.

=== List of local authorities ===
There are 12 local authorities in Selangor, namely:

1. Ampang Jaya Municipal Council (MPAJ)
2. Hulu Selangor Municipal Council (MPHS)
3. Kajang Municipal Council (MPKJ)
4. Klang Royal City Council (MBDK)
5. Kuala Langat Municipal Council (MPKL)
6. Kuala Selangor Municipal Council (MPKS)
7. Petaling Jaya City Council (MBPJ)
8. Sabak Bernam District Council (MDSB)
9. Selayang Municipal Council (MPS)
10. Sepang Municipal Council (MPSepang)
11. Shah Alam City Council (MBSA)
12. Subang Jaya City Council (MBSJ)

== Economy ==
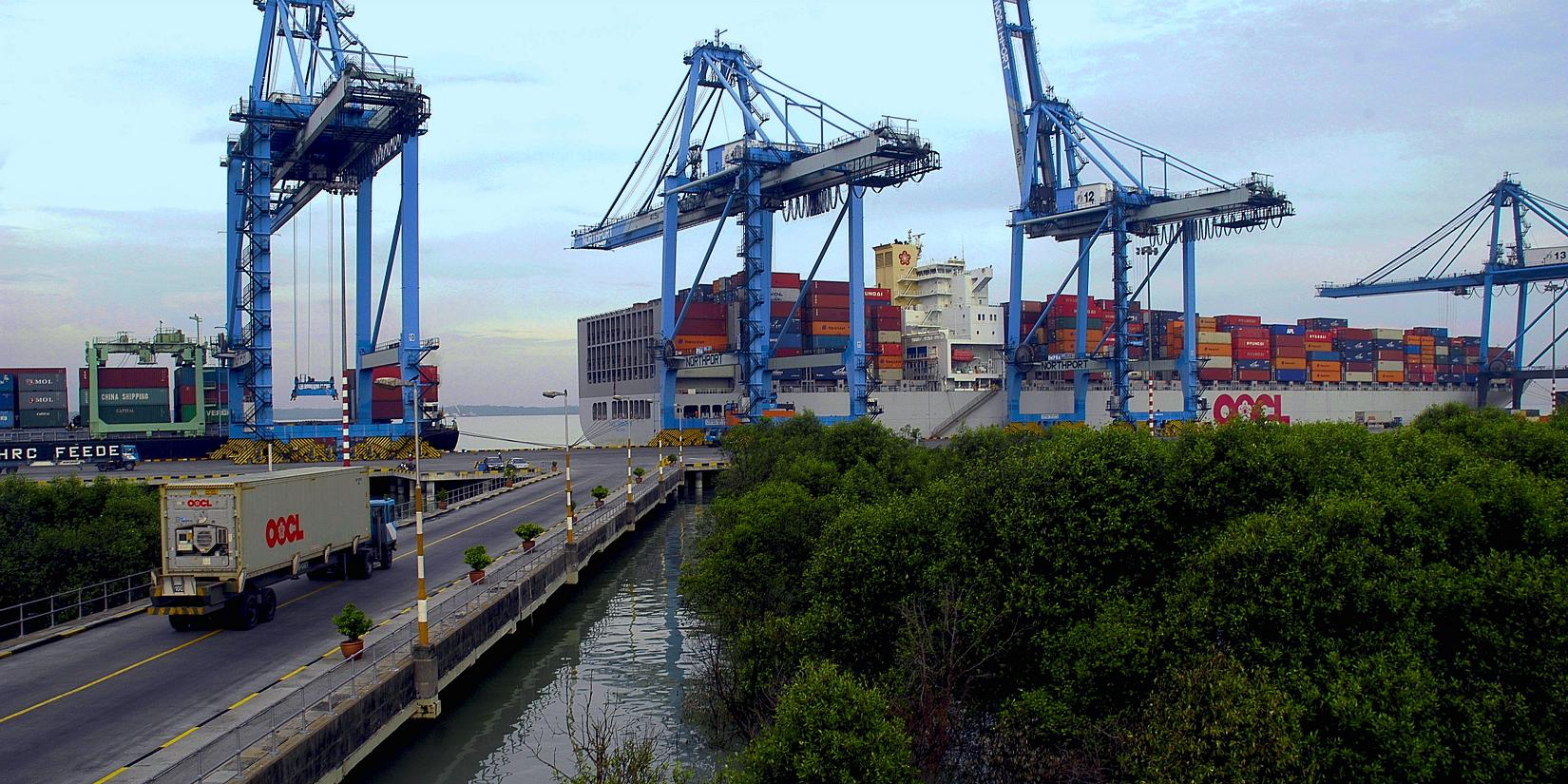
Northport Malaysia Wharf in Port Klang

The economy of Selangor is a progressive market economy whose core sectors are commerce and agriculture. Selangor is the richest state in Malaysia in terms of gross domestic product (GDP) per capita (PPP). On 27 August 2005, Selangor was officially declared the first developed state in Malaysia by the state government.

=== Commerce and industry ===
Commerce, industry and services are a major contributor to the economy of Selangor, accounting for over 58% of the state's GDP. Several industrial sites produce electronic goods, chemicals and vehicles including Proton and Perodua cars. Imported vehicles from manufacturers including Toyota, Nissan, Volkswagen and BMW Motors are also assembled in the state.

Many international manufacturing companies have set up bases here. Among the industrial cities in Selangor are Subang Jaya, Shah Alam, Klang, Kajang, Rawang, Selayang, Ampang Jaya and Petaling Jaya. Port Klang plays a key role in the industrial development of Selangor because it is the busiest port in Malaysia.

The services sector is the second largest contributor to GDP, accounting for 60.1% of the state's GDP.

=== Agriculture ===
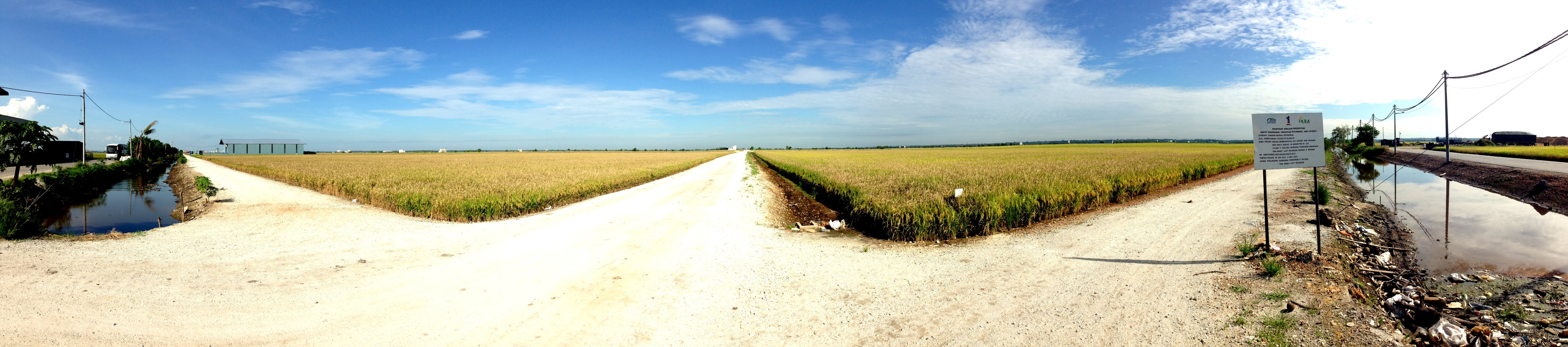
Paddy field in Sekinchan

Agriculture, a thriving sector of Selangor's economy, contributes 1.4% of the state's GDP. Agricultural activities of significance in the state include the establishment of palm oil and rubber plantation sites. Selangor was one of the states in colonial Malaya where rubber plantations were first established in early the 20th century. and Malaya became the world's biggest producer of rubber by the 1930s. Later many rubber plantations were replaced by palm oil in the later part of the 20th century. Coconut and coffee were also planted. Other crops grown in the state are star fruits, papayas and bananas. Selangor is not a major producer of rice; however, paddy fields exist in Kuala Selangor and Sabak Bernam.

== Tourism ==
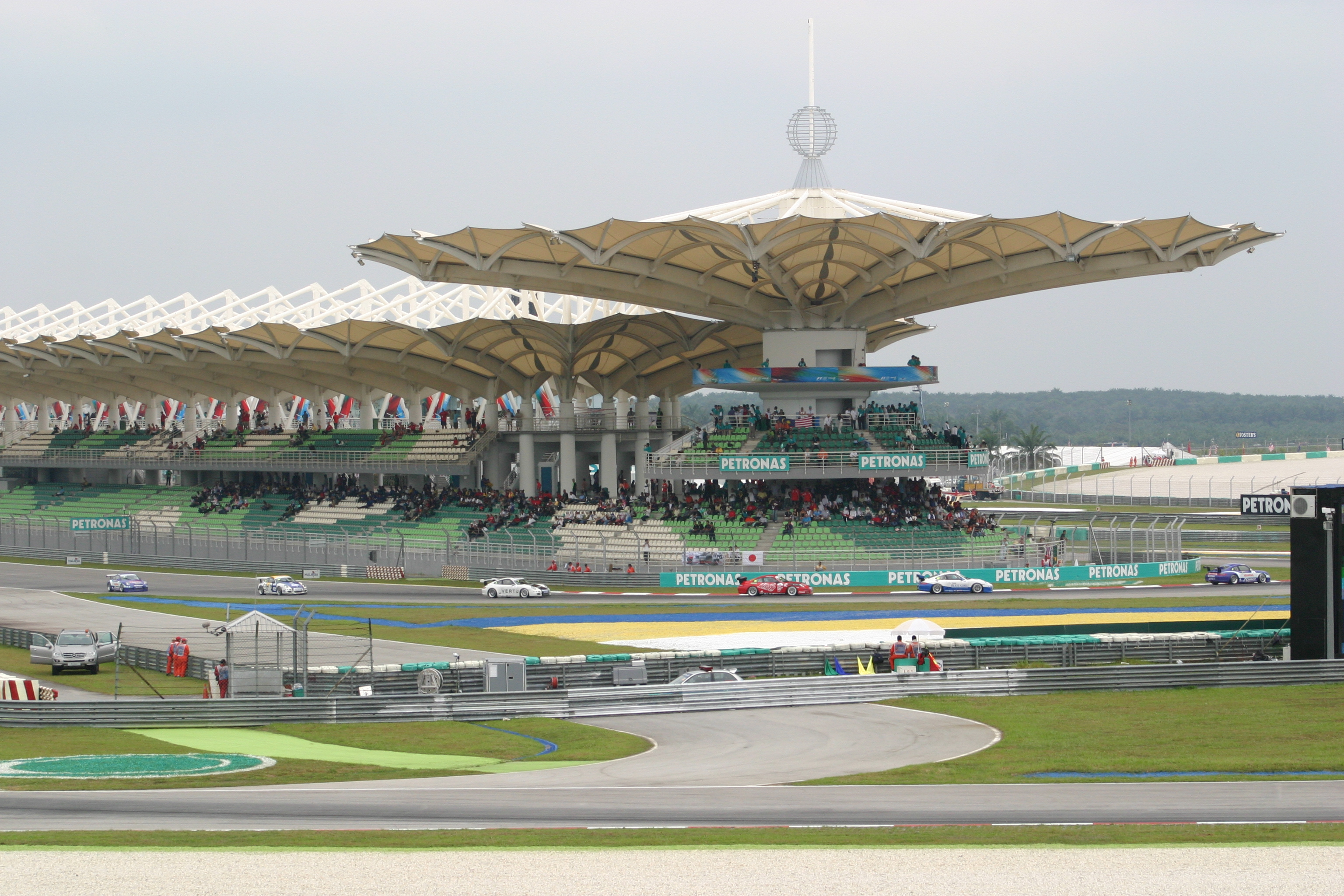
Sepang International Circuit in Sepang

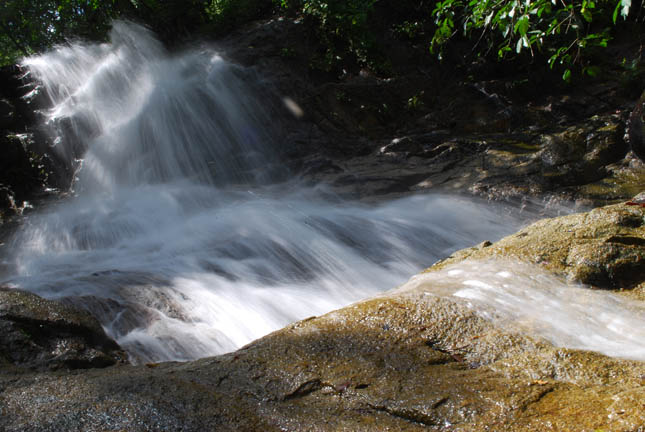
Kanching Forest Waterfall in Rawang

Tourist attractions in Selangor include the I-City in Shah Alam, a retail and commercial hub with millions of LED lights and an indoor park; the National Zoo of Malaysia (Zoo Negara) in Ampang Jaya, the largest zoo in Malaysia with more than 4,000 animals; Sepang International Circuit in Sepang, the venue for the Formula One Malaysian Grand Prix, the A1 Grand Prix and the Malaysian Motorcycle Grand Prix; the Sultan Salahuddin Abdul Aziz Shah Mosque; Wat Chetawan and Sunway Lagoon in Bandar Sunway, Malaysia's top theme park.

Other attractions in Selangor include Batu Caves in Selayang, Shah Alam Gallery and Selangor State Library in Shah Alam, the Sultan Abdul Aziz Royal Gallery, Alam Shah Palace, GM Klang Wholesale City, and Crab Island (Pulau Ketam) off Port Klang. The most popular beaches in Selangor are located at Bagan Lalang, Sepang Gold Coast, Batu Laut Beach and Morib Beach. There are also a number of pristine nature sites such as the Firefly Sanctuary, Kuala Selangor Nature Park in Kuala Selangor, Malaysia Agriculture Park Bukit Cerakah in Shah Alam, Commonwealth Forest Park and Forest Research Institute Malaysia (FRIM) in Selayang, and Ampang Recreational Forest and Kanching Recreational Forest in Ampang Jaya.

Selangor is also well known as a haven for massage and spa lovers. Since 2009, there has been an increase in businesses operating as traditional massage and reflexology parlours. While most of the businesses are genuine, some brothels masquerade as massage parlours and spas; the Royal Malaysian Police frequently raid such establishments when they receive tip-offs from the public.

== Transport ==
Selangor is linked to the rest of Malaysia by comprehensive air, road and rail connections. Public transport in the state is present but underused. Most of the major highways that run through the west coast of the peninsula, including the North–South Expressway, serve Selangor as well. The high-speed roads and expressways are tolled; motorists using these roads pay the tolls using stored value cards such as Touch 'n Go and SmartTAG. Cash transactions at all tolls in Malaysia were phased out between 2015 and 2017.

Kuala Lumpur International Airport (KLIA), the country's main airport, is located in Sepang District in the south of the state; it consists of the Main Terminal Building, Satellite terminal A and klia2. Selangor also has the domestic Subang Airport, which is a major hub for corporate and private aviation in south-east Asia.

Port Klang, the busiest seaport in Malaysia by sea, is located at the western tip of Selangor.

Paid bus routes in Kuala Lumpur connect Klang Sentral in Klang, Kompleks Perhentian Kajang in Kajang, One Utama Bus Transportation Hub in Petaling Jaya, and Terminal Seksyen 13 in Shah Alam to other states in Malaysia. Public bus services that connects towns in Selangor are also available such as Rapid Bus. Rapid Bus, operated by Rapid KL, offered services in Klang Valley area, namely Subang Jaya, USJ, Puchong, Petaling Jaya, Shah Alam, and Klang south of the Federal Highway and Area Six, which covers Damansara, Bandar Utama, Kota Damansara and areas of Petaling Jaya, Shah Alam, and Klang north of the Federal Highway. The services was introduced on 23 September 2006 when Rapid KL decided to revamp the Klang Valley bus network. Other bus operators in Selangor includes Wawasan Sutera Travel & Tours Sdn Bhd (Klang and Banting), MARA Liner Sdn Bhd (Rawang and Hulu Selangor), Handal Ceria Sdn Bhd (Puchong, Klang south and Sepang) and The Selangor Omnibus Company Berhad (Damansara Damai and Kuala Selangor).

Starting from 15 July 2015, free public bus services named Bas Smart Selangor are also available all over Selangor. It was initiate to encourage the citizens to use public transport. On 7 November 2017, a phone application called Selangor Intelligent Transport System to check Smart Selangor buses routes and schedules was launched.

The KTM Komuter railway network serves many outlying districts and nearby towns and cities, including Kajang, Port Klang, Shah Alam, Subang Jaya, Petaling Jaya, and Rawang. It is linked to other rail transit services at KL Sentral Station, a modern transportation hub in the city centre. Selangor is accessible by the Rapid KL Light Rail Transit network, which is composed of the Ampang Line, the Kelana Jaya Line and the newly completed Sungai Buloh-Kajang Mass Rapid Transit Network.

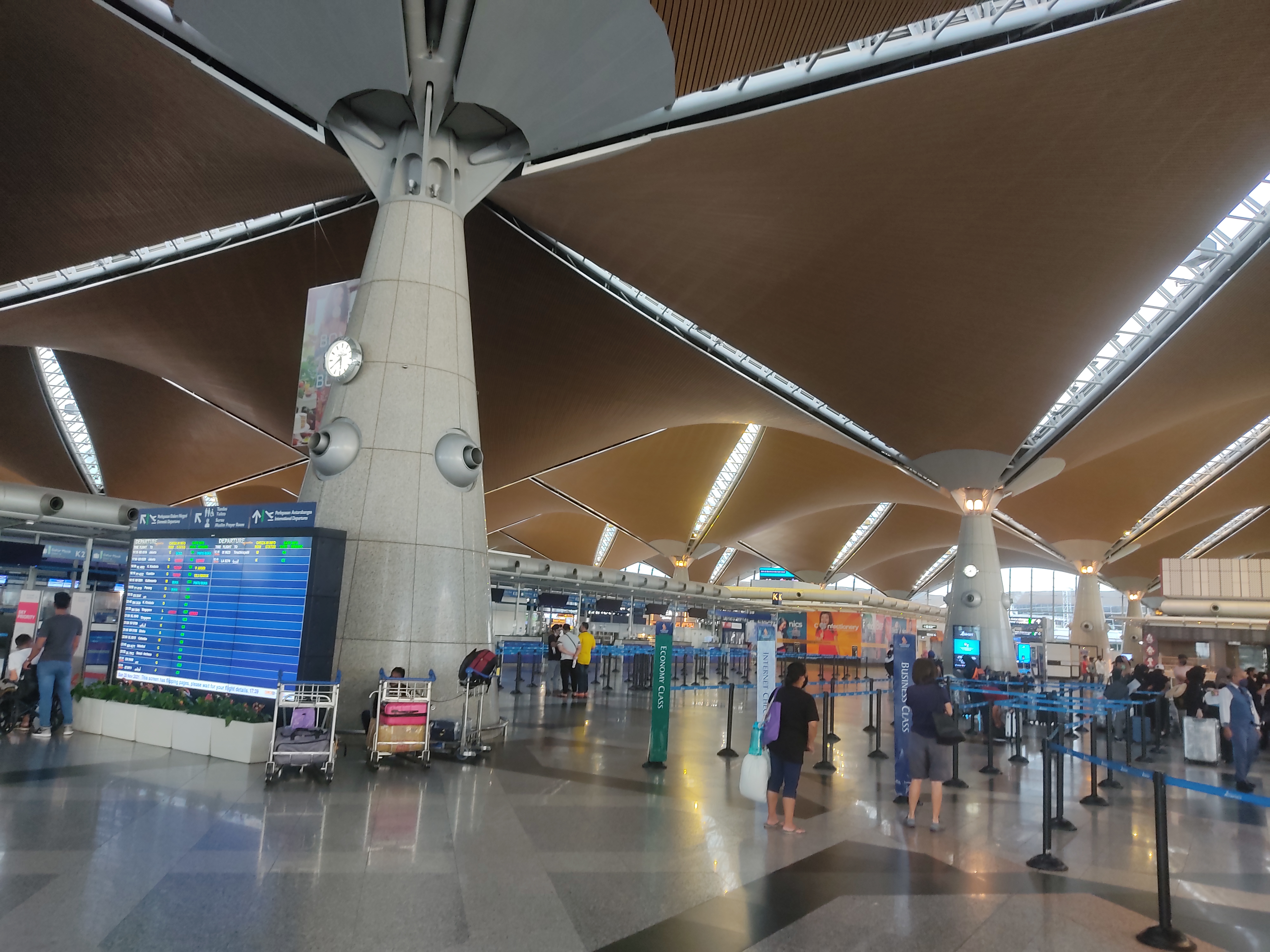
Main Terminal Building in KLIA Sepang

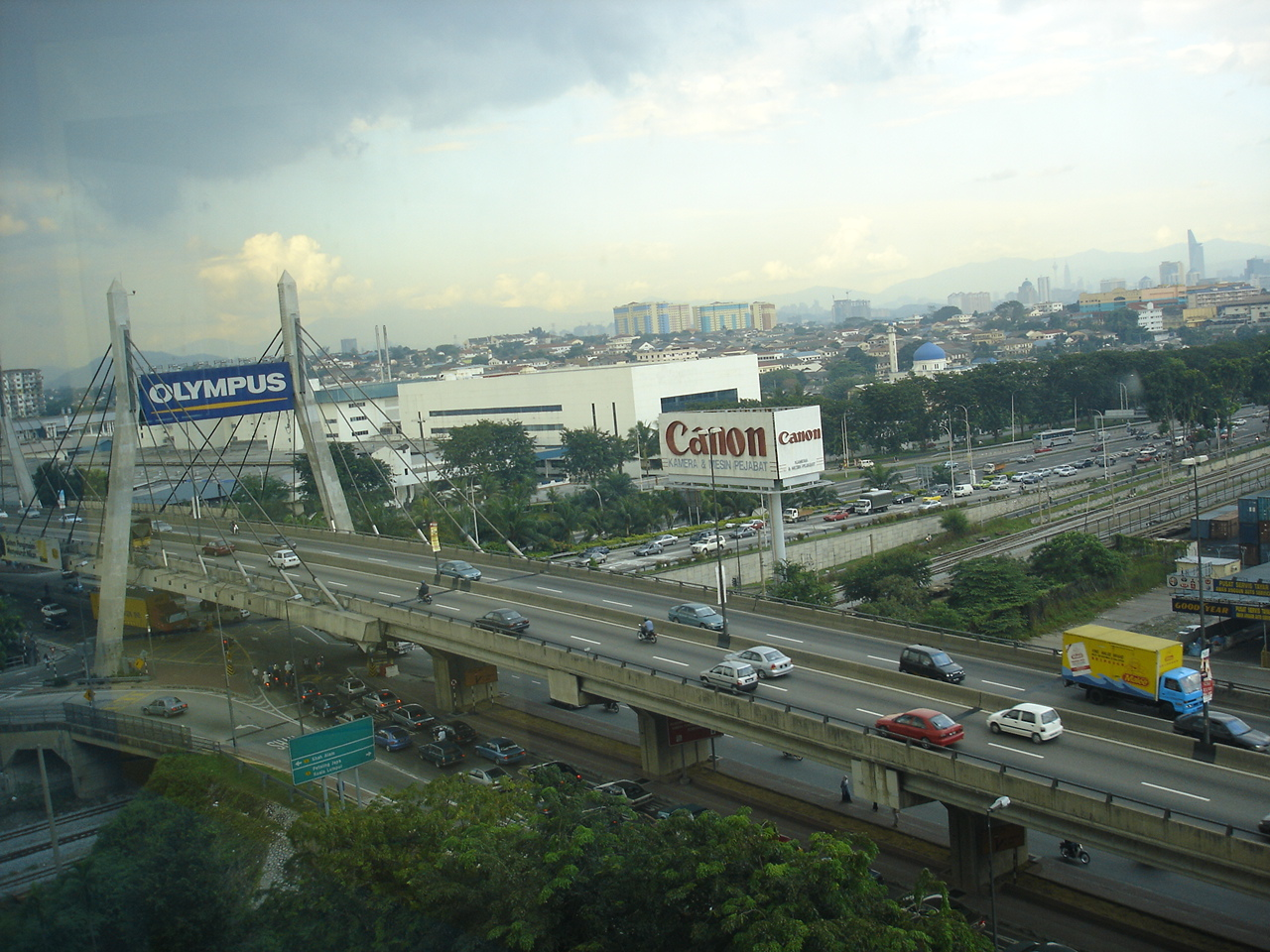
The cable-stayed bridge of Damansara–Puchong Expressway

Klang Valley rapid transit map, yellow area are stations that in Selangor

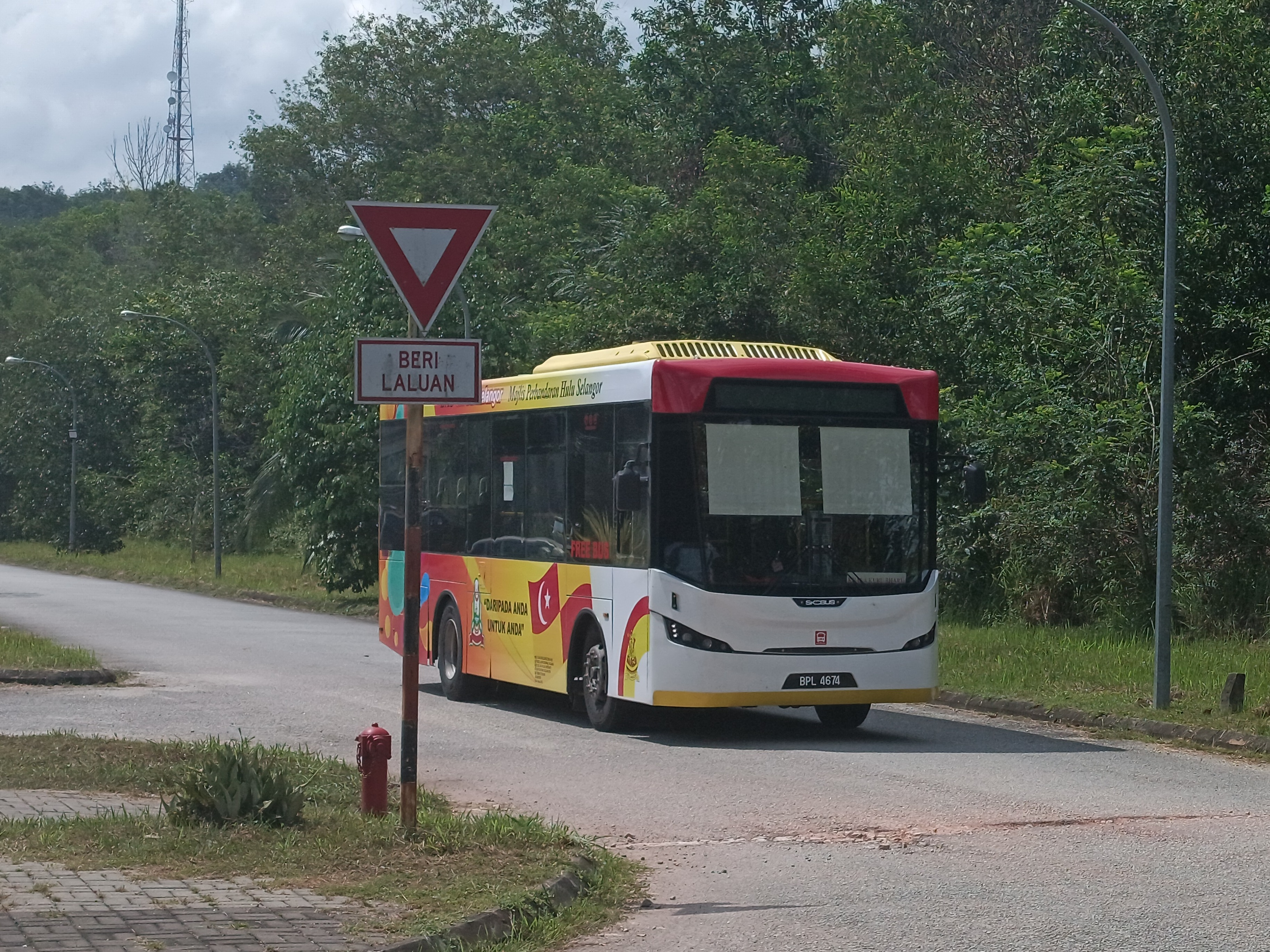
A Smart Selangor bus in Hulu Selangor

=== MRT network ===
- Kajang Line

The MRT Kajang line, or previously known as SBK (Sungai Buloh-Kajang) Line, is the ninth rail transit line and the second fully automated and driverless rail system in the Klang Valley area, Malaysia after the Kelana Jaya Line. It is a part of Greater KL/Klang Valley Integrated Transit System. The line is numbered 9 and coloured Green on official transit maps. The first MRT line covers a span of 46 kilometres from Kwasa Damansara to Kajang, passing the Kuala Lumpur city centre where the alignment goes underground. The line will be serving a corridor with 1.2 million residents within the Klang Valley region from north-west to the south-east of Kuala Lumpur. The line starts from Kwasa Damansara which is located to the north-west of Kuala Lumpur, which runs on an elevated guideway to the Semantan portal, passing through Kota Damansara, Bandar Utama, Seksyen 17 and Damansara Town Centre. Kwasa Damansara provides a cross-platform interchange between the SBK line and Sungai Buloh–Serdang–Putrajaya line (SSP line). The line continues in twin-bore tunnels to the Maluri portal, passing through the city centre and the Golden Triangle of Kuala Lumpur. Interchange to other lines is provided from Muzium Negara to Maluri with the exception of Cochrane in the Kuala Lumpur city. Beyond Taman Pertama, the line passes through Cheras and ends in Kajang via an elevated guideway. The line serves a corridor with an estimated population of 1.2 million people

- Putrajaya Line

The MRT Putrajaya line previously known as MRT Sungai Buloh-Serdang-Putrajaya line (MRT SSP) is the twelfth rail transit line, the fourth fully automated and driverless rail system in Klang Valley area. It is a part of the larger rail transport system in Kuala Lumpur known as Greater KL/Klang Valley Integrated Transit System. The line is numbered 12 and coloured gold on transit maps.

It is one of three planned MRT rail lines under Klang Valley Mass Rapid Transit Project by MRT Corp. Phase 1 between Kwasa Damansara and Kampung Batu was operational on 16 June 2022. The remaining line is expected to be operational in 2023.

The approved rail alignment is 52.2 km in length, of which 13.5 km is underground. A total of 37 stations, 11 of which are underground, will be built. The line will stretch from Sungai Buloh to Putrajaya and will include densely populated areas Sri Damansara, Kepong, Batu, Jalan Sultan Azlan Shah, Jalan Tun Razak, KLCC, Tun Razak Exchange, Kuchai Lama, Seri Kembangan, and Cyberjaya. It is expected to have a ridership of 533,000 passengers per day once completed

=== Extensions to the LRT network ===
On 29 August 2006, Malaysian Deputy Prime Minister Mohd Najib Abdul Razak announced that the western end of the Kelana Jaya Line would be extended to the suburbs of Bandar Sunway, Subang Jaya, UEP Subang Jaya (USJ) and Putra Heights. The extension will be part of a RM7 billion plan to expand Kuala Lumpur's public transport network.

The expansion plan will also extend the Ampang Line to the suburb of Puchong and the south-west of Kuala Lumpur. The plan also involves the construction of a new line, tentatively called the Kota Damansara-Cheras Line, which will run from Sungai Buloh in the north-western flank of the city, to Kajang.

In September 2009, Syarikat Prasarana Negara began a public viewing of the details of the alignment of the Ampang Line and Kelana Jaya Line at various locations. The public could provide feedback on the route during the three-month display period. The extension will add 13 new stations and 17.7 kilometres (11.0 miles) of new track to the network. The new terminus will be at Putra Heights where the line will meet the Kelana Jaya Line and Ampang Line to provide a suburban interchange. Construction began in mid 2013 and the project was fully operational by July 2016.

Public transport systems in Selangor
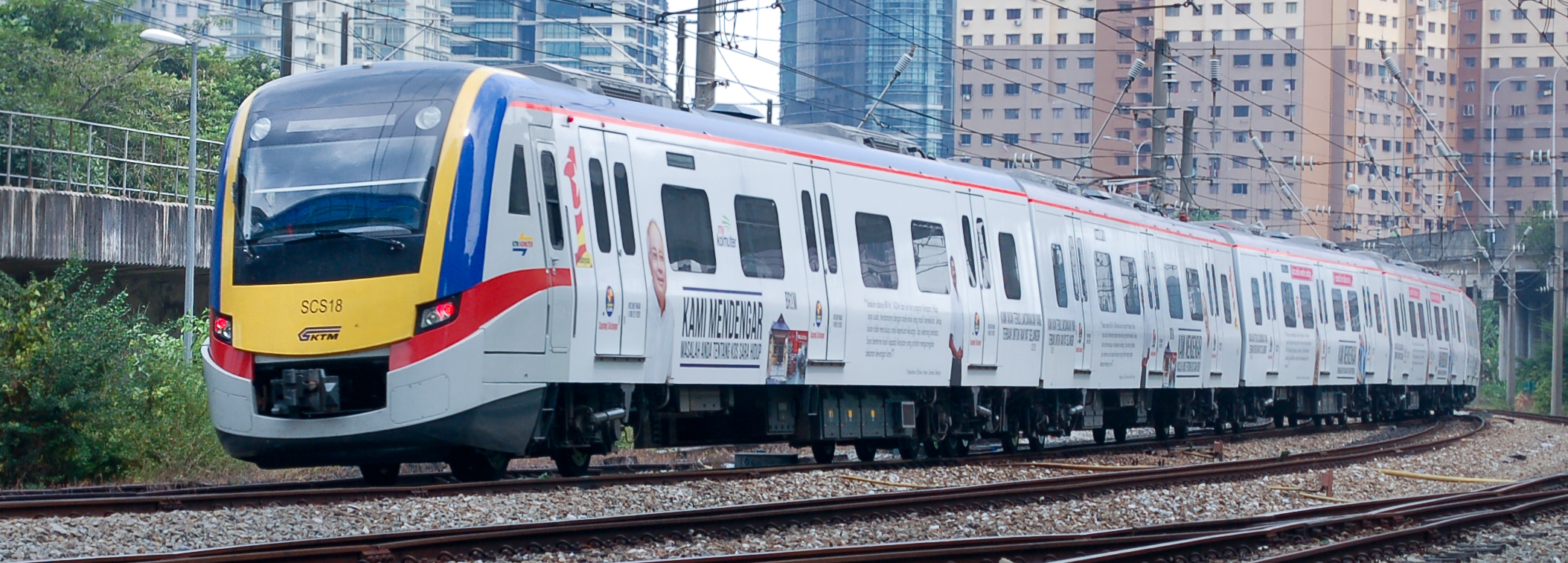
KTM Komuter

Kajang Line

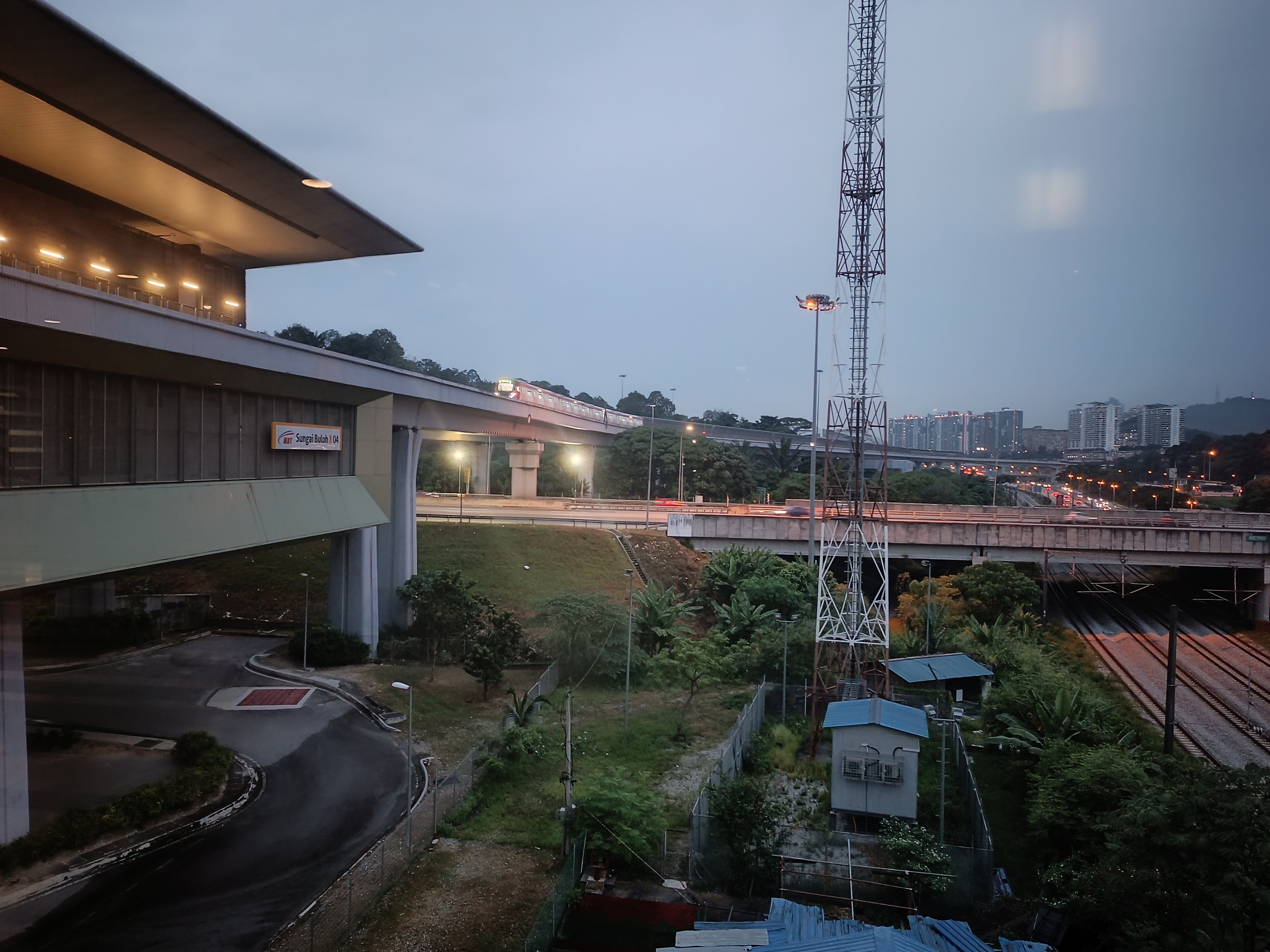
Putrajaya Line

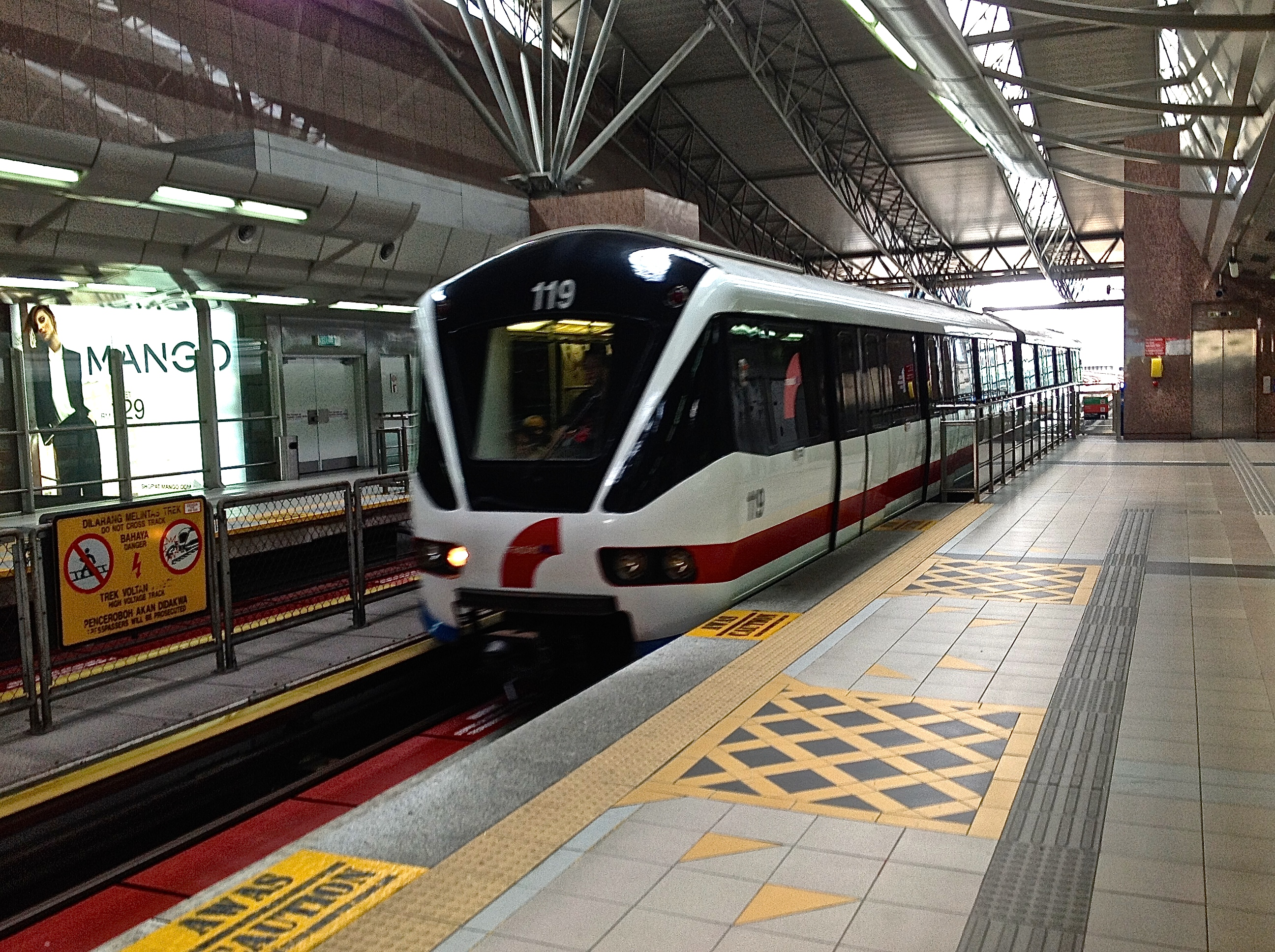
Kelana Jaya Line

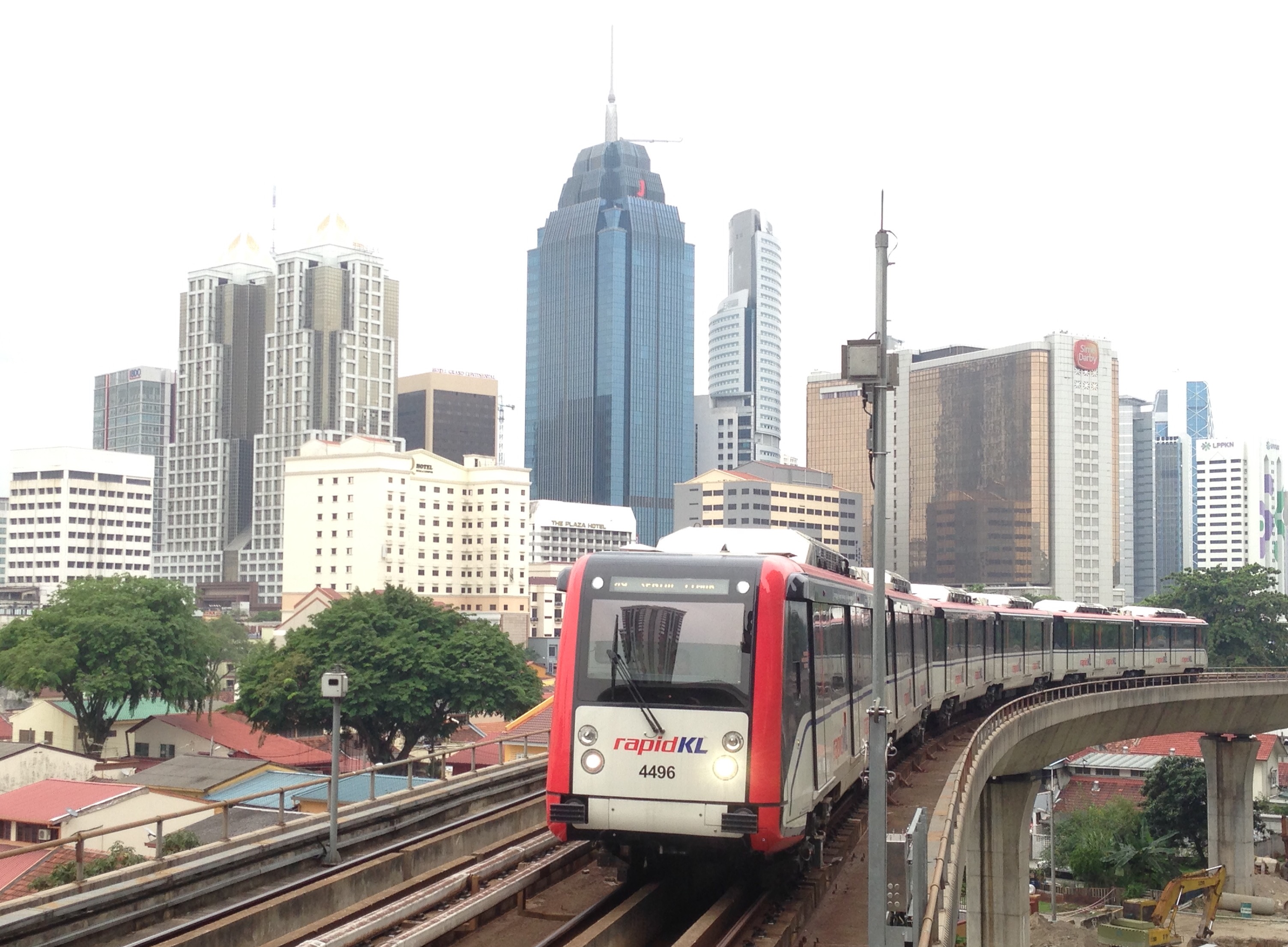
Ampang and Sri Petaling Lines

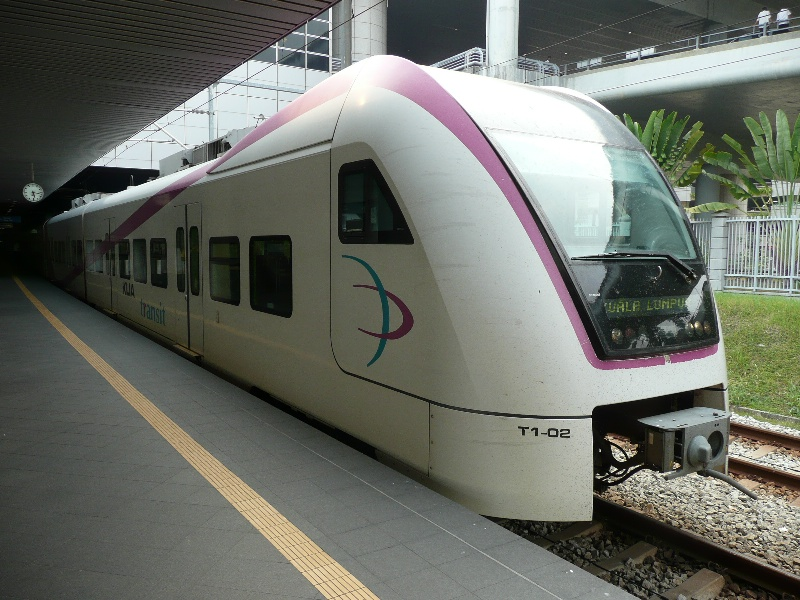
Express Rail Link
(Airport express to KUL)

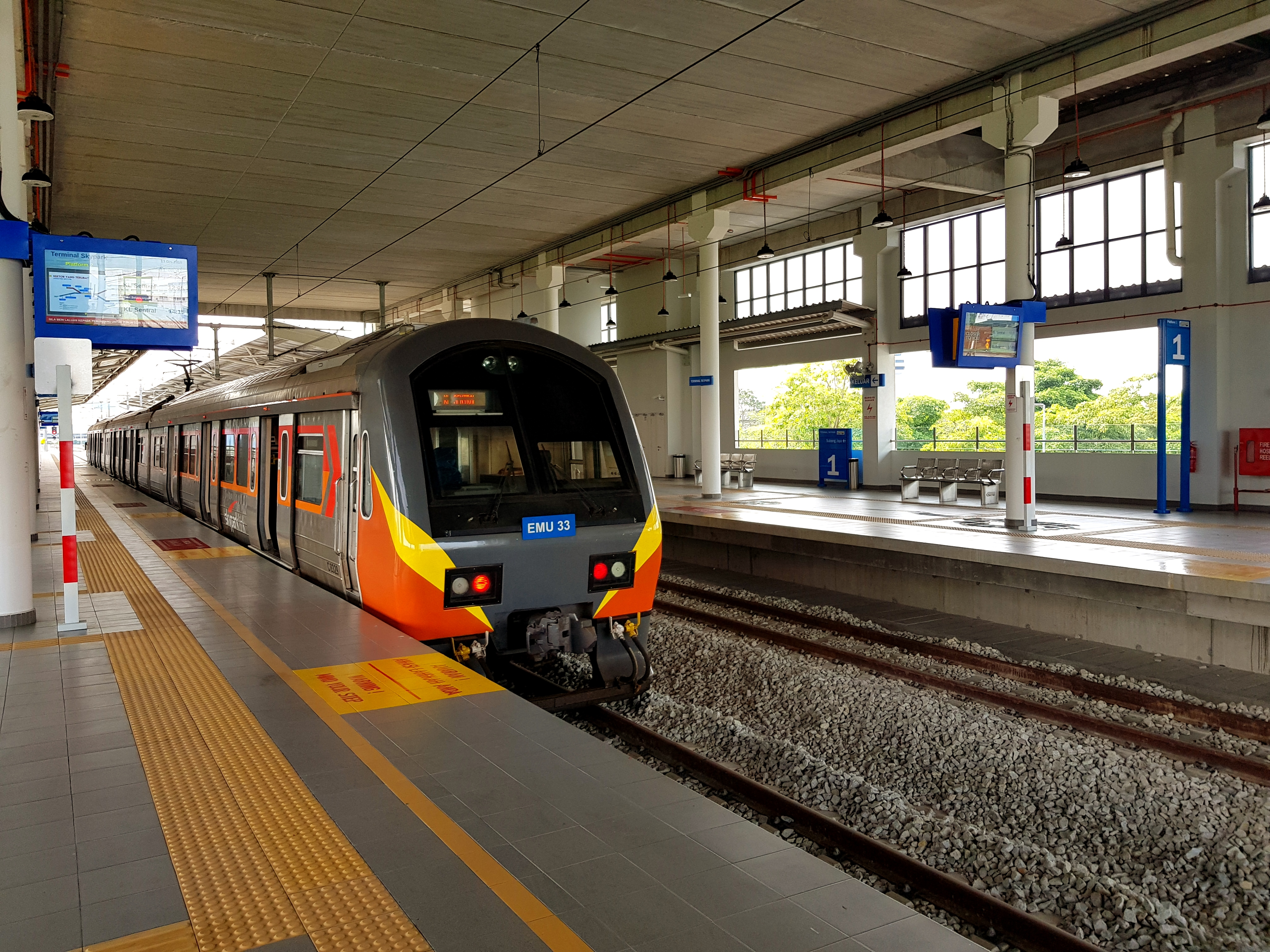
KTM Komuter Skypark Link
(Airport express to SZB)

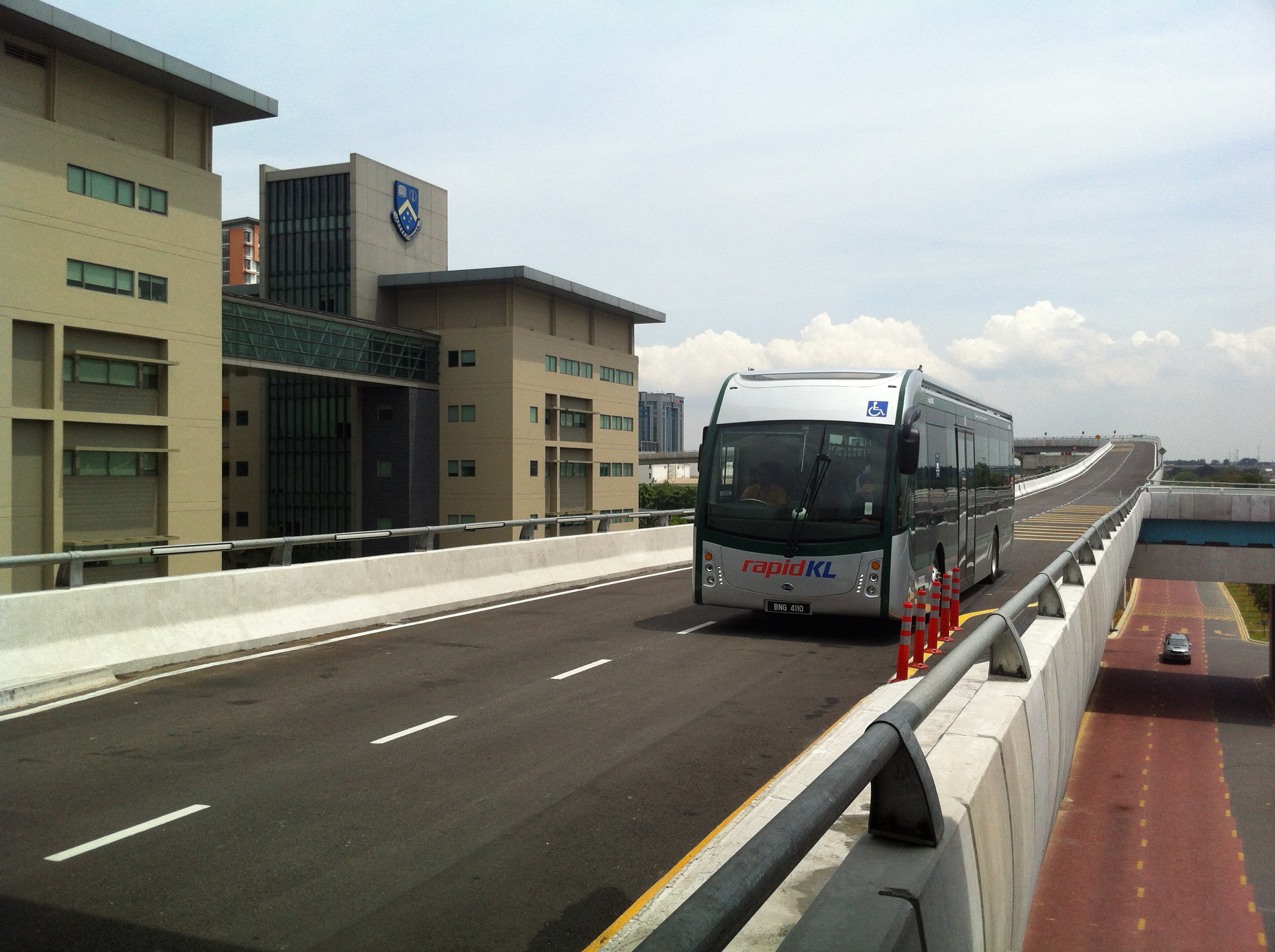
Bandar Sunway BRT

== Education ==
Selangor has several tertiary education institutions, most of which are concentrated in major towns and cities.

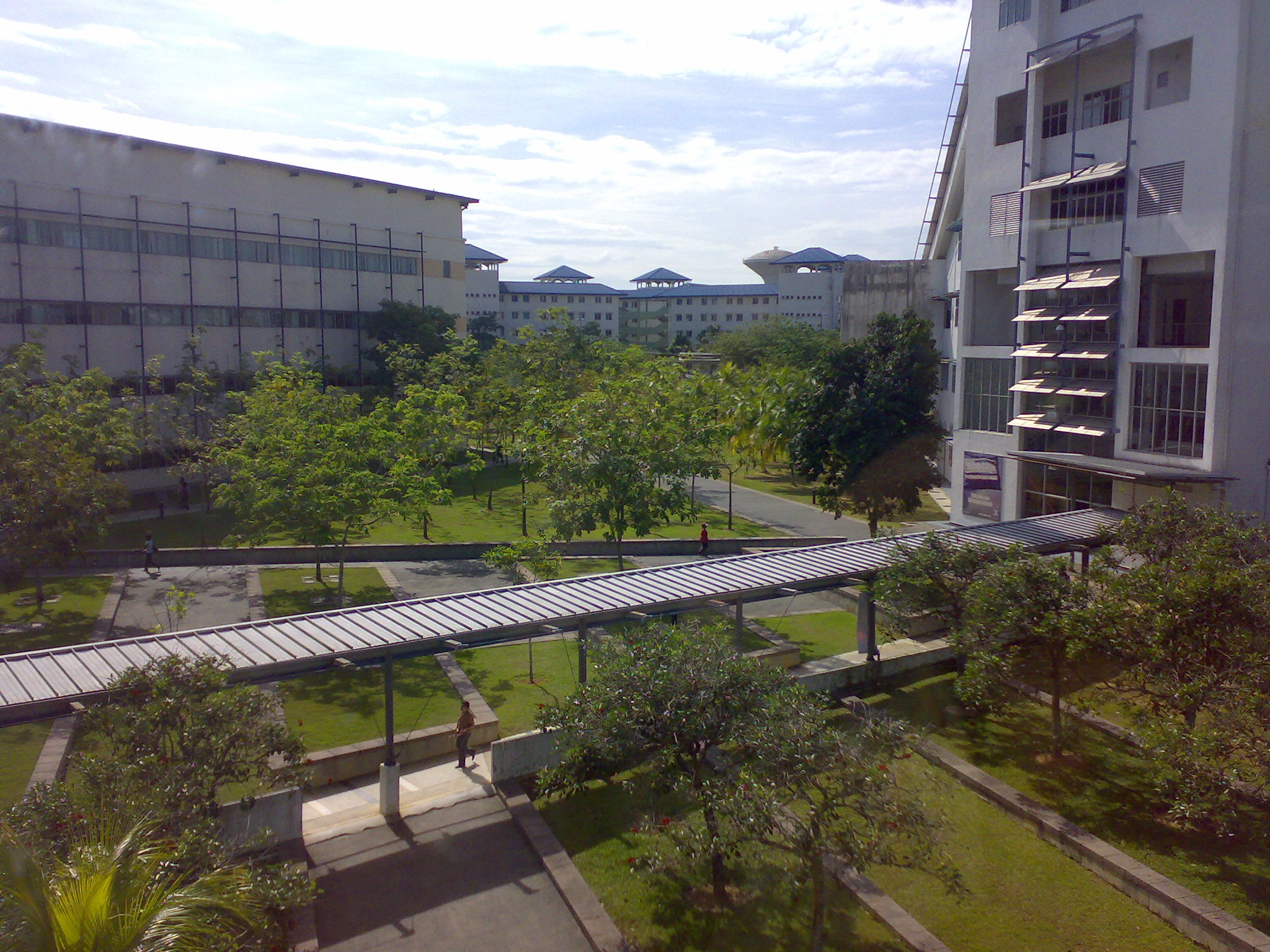
An aerial view of Multimedia University's Cyberjaya campus. Multimedia University is Malaysia's first private university.

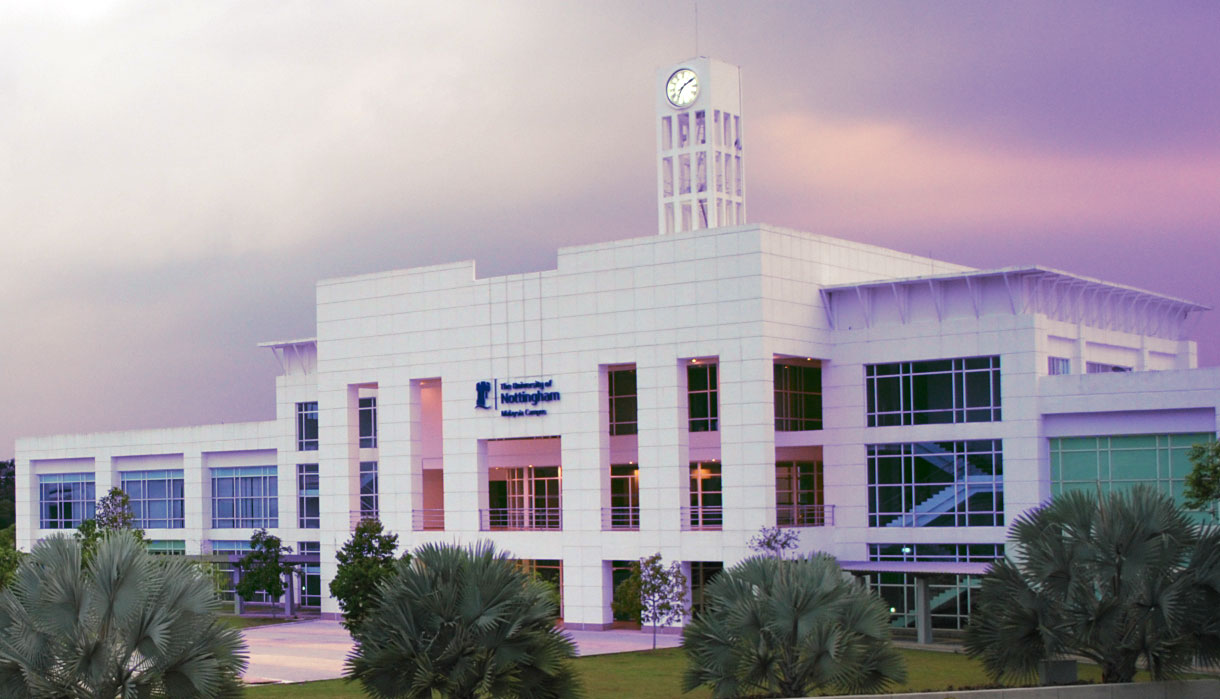
The main building of the University of Nottingham's Malaysian Campus in Semenyih

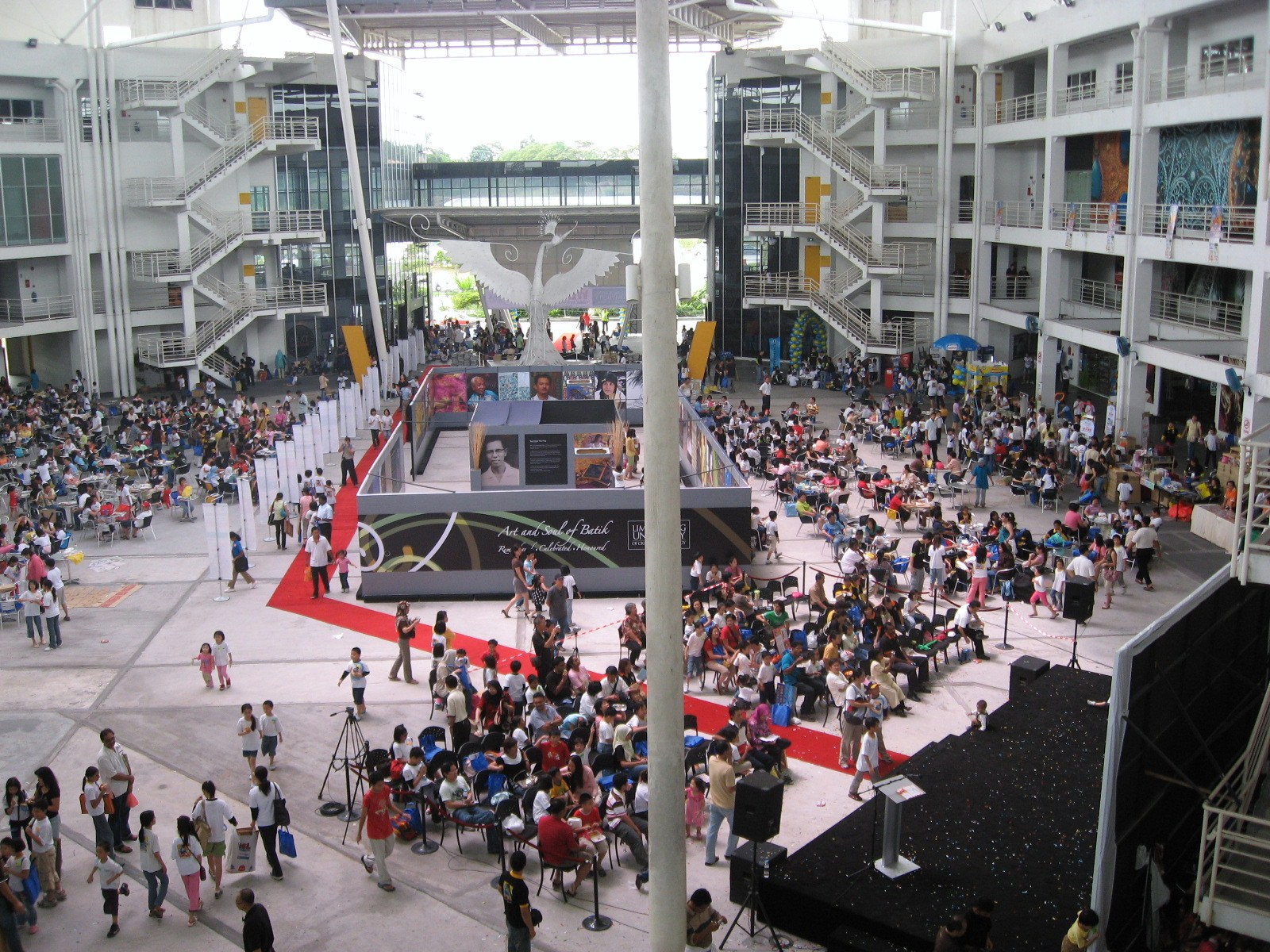
Limkokwing University of Creative Technology in Cyberjaya

=== Public universities ===
Name	Acronym	Foundation	Location
International Islamic University of Malaysia	IIUM	1983	Gombak
Universiti Teknologi MARA	UiTM	1999	Shah Alam & Puncak Alam
Universiti Kebangsaan Malaysia	UKM	1970	Bangi
Universiti Putra Malaysia	UPM	1971	Serdang

=== Private universities and university colleges ===
Name	Acronym	Foundation	Location
Al-Madinah International University	MEDIU	2006	Shah Alam
First City University College	FCUC	1990	Bandar Utama
Binary University of Management and Entrepreneurship	BUCME	1984	Puchong
City University Malaysia	CITY U	1984	Petaling Jaya
University of Cyberjaya	CUCMS	2005	Cyberjaya
University of Selangor	UNISEL	1999	Bestari Jaya & Shah Alam
INTI International College Subang	INTI	1998	Subang Jaya
International University College of Technology Twintech	TWINTECH	1994	Bangi
HELP University	HELP	1986	Shah Alam
KDU University College	KDU	1983	Damansara Utama
Infrastructure University Kuala Lumpur	IUKL	1997	Kajang
Limkokwing University of Creative Technology	LUCT	1992	Cyberjaya
German-Malaysian Institute	GMi	1991	Bangi
Malaysian Allied Health Sciences Academy University	MAHSA	2005	Bandar Saujana Putra & Petaling Jaya
Malaysia University of Science & Technology	MUST	2000	Petaling Jaya
Management and Science University	MSU	2002	Shah Alam
UCSI University	UCSI	1986	Cheras
Asia Metropolitan University	MASTERSKILL	1997	Cheras
Multimedia University	MMU	1994	Cyberjaya
SEGi University	SEGi	1977	Kota Damansara & Subang Jaya
International Islamic University College Selangor	KUIS	1995	Bangi
Sunway University	SYUC	1987	Subang Jaya
Taylor's University	TAYLOR	1969	Subang Jaya
University of Tenaga Nasional	UNITEN	1976	Kajang
Tun Abdul Razak University	UNIRAZAK	1998	Petaling Jaya
Universiti Tunku Abdul Rahman	UTAR	2002	Sungai Long

=== International universities campus in Selangor ===
Name	Acronym	Foundation	Location	From
Monash University Malaysia	Monash	1998	Subang Jaya	Australia
University of Nottingham Malaysia Campus	UNMC	2000	Semenyih	United Kingdom
Xiamen University Malaysia Campus	XMUMC	2015	Salak Tinggi	China

== Infrastructures and utilities ==
=== Electricity ===
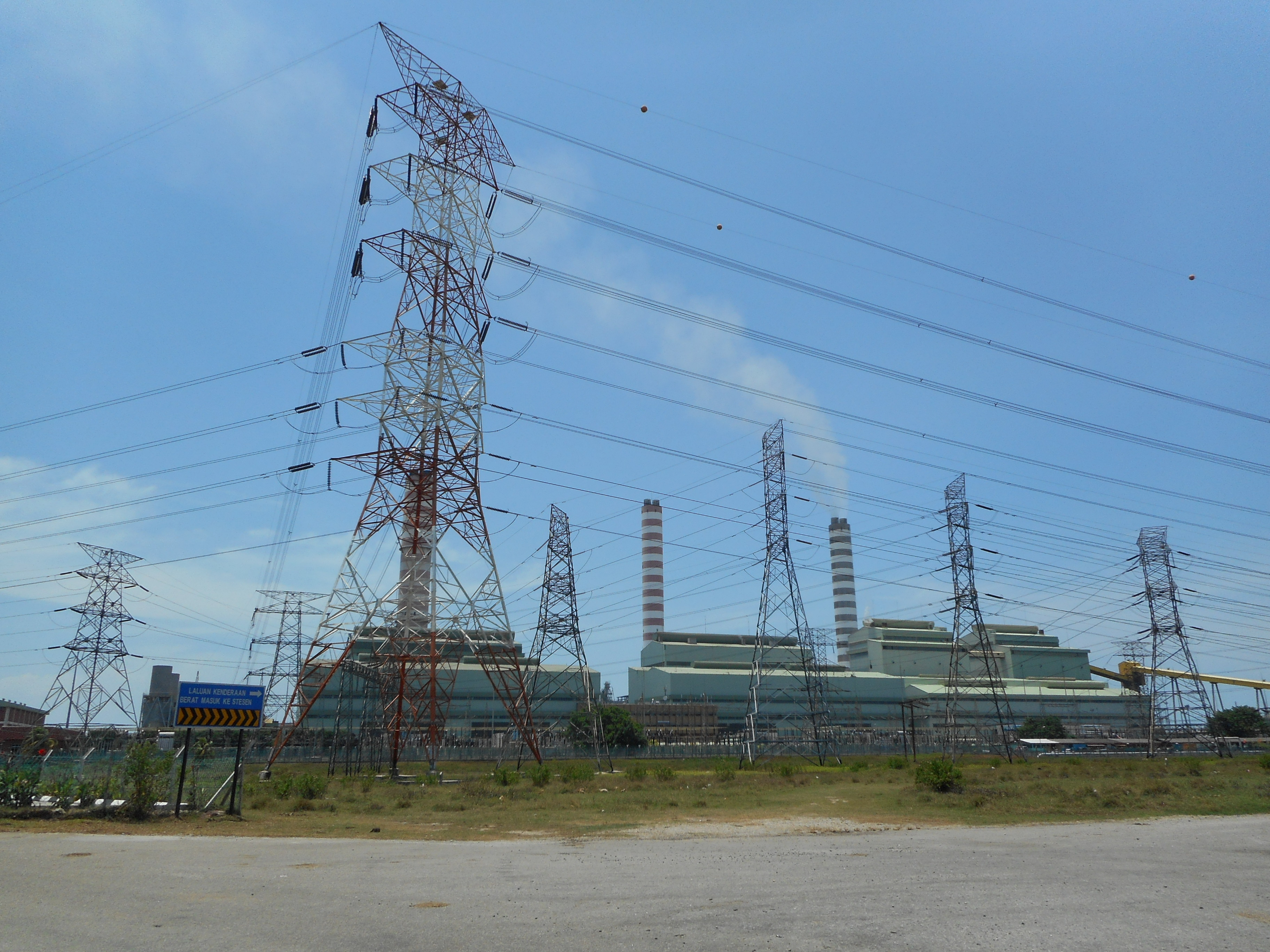
Sultan Abdul Aziz Shah Power Station in Kapar, Klang

There are five main power stations in Selangor, namely; Sultan Salahuddin Abdul Aziz Shah Power Station, Connaught Bridge Power Station, Putrajaya Power Station, Kuala Langat Power Plant and Jimah Energy Ventures.

=== Water supply ===
Selangor water works provides water supply in Selangor, Kuala Lumpur and Putrajaya. It was run by Syarikat Bekalan Air Selangor (SYABAS) which is owned by the state government. There are seven dams in Selangor; Sungai Selangor Dam, Sungai Tinggi Dam, Sungai Semenyih Dam, Sungai Langat Dam, Klang Gates Dam, Sungai Batu Dam, ORS Sungai Labu Dam and Tasik Subang Dam.

=== Shopping malls ===
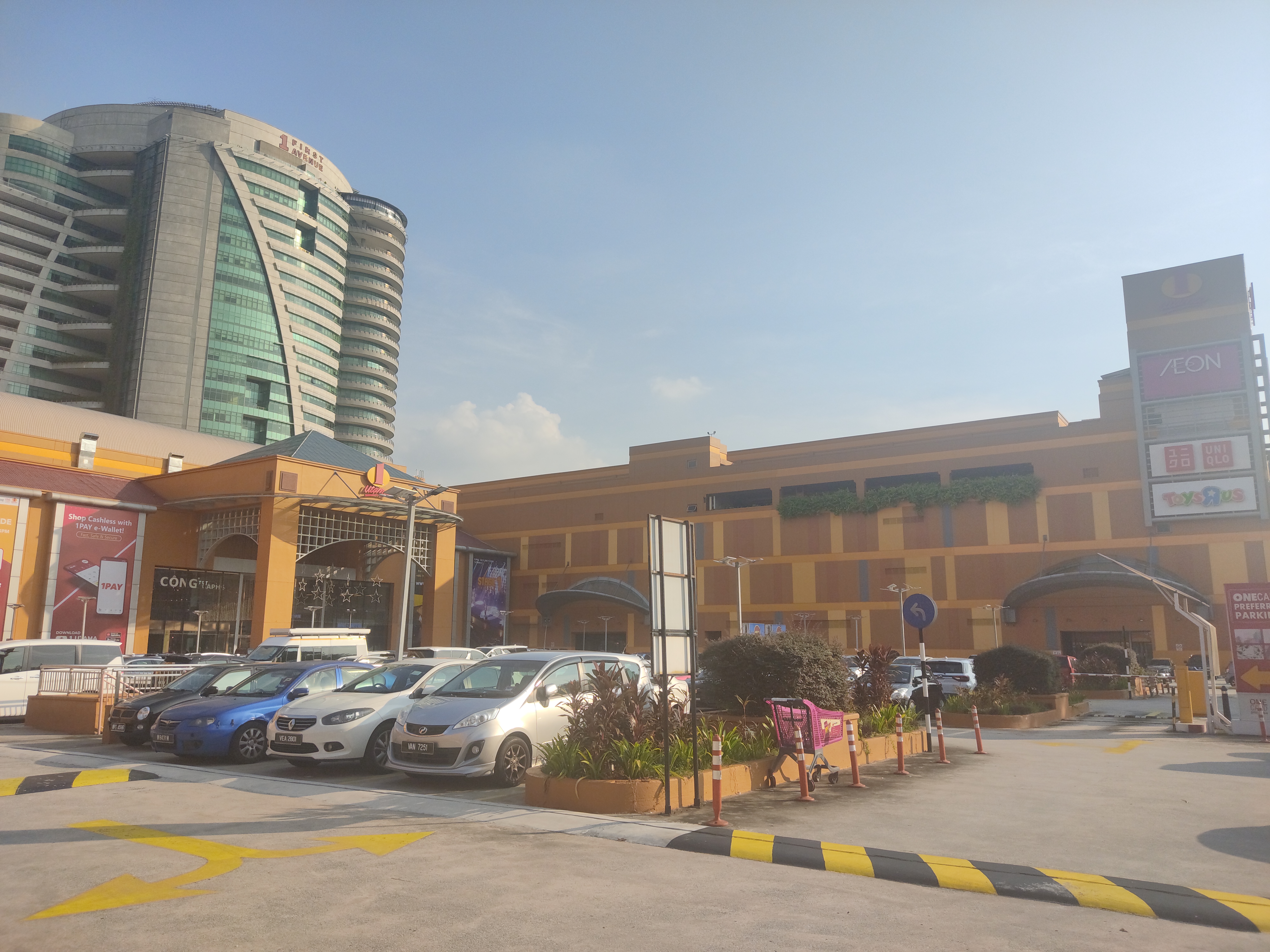
1 Utama Shopping Centre in Petaling Jaya is the second largest shopping mall in Malaysia.

Notable shopping malls in Selangor include:

- i-City
- IDCC Convention Centre
- Plaza Alam Sentral
- 1 Utama
- Sunway Pyramid
- The Curve
- AEON Bukit Tinggi
- The Mines
- IPC Shopping Centre
- IOI Mall Puchong
- Subang Parade
- Empire Subang
- Klang Parade
- IOI City Mall

=== Hospitals ===
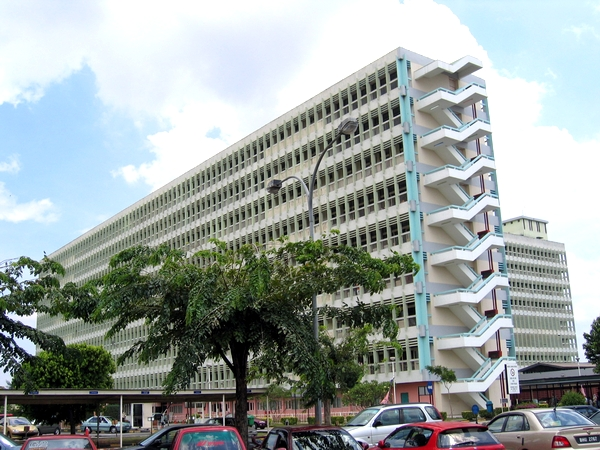
Main view of the Tengku Ampuan Rahimah (TAR) General Hospital in Klang. Named after Tengku Ampuan of Selangor, Tengku Ampuan Rahimah.

Notable public and private hospitals in Selangor include:

==== Public hospitals ====
- Kajang Hospital
- Serdang Hospital
- Sungai Buloh Hospital
- Tengku Ampuan Rahimah Hospital, Klang

==== Private hospitals ====
- Assunta Hospital
- Sunway Medical Centre
- Columbia Asia Hospital

== Cuisine ==
The traditional Malay cuisine in Selangor has influences from Johor, Bugis, Javanese and Minangkabau.

Rojak Klang and Lontong Klang are famous cuisines in Klang and Shah Alam. Other famous dishes include Mee Rebus, Satay Kajang, Nasi Ambeng, Laksa Selangor, Soto (Soto Nasi Himpit and Mee Soto), Sambal Tahun, Bakso, Ketam Darul Ehsan, Mentarang Bakar, Ikan Masak Asam Pedas, Ayam Masak Kicap and Sayur Masak Rebung.

== Media ==
=== Television ===
Television in Selangor consists of seven free-to-air stations, one satellite television network and two internet television services. Three of the seven free-to-air stations are managed by Radio Televisyen Malaysia, a federal government-owned media company headquartered in Kuala Lumpur, while the four commercial stations are owned by Media Prima, an integrated media company headquartered in Bandar Utama, Selangor. The satellite television service is owned by Astro All Asia Networks and it is available nationwide. One of the Internet television services is owned by the state government of Selangor.

Type	Channels
Free-to-air	Radio Televisyen Malaysia (RTM); Media Prima
Cable television	ABNXcess
Satellite television	Astro (All Astro Plc)
Internet television	TVSelangor; ANN (Asia News Network)

=== Radio ===
Radio stations in Selangor are available in the FM and shortwave frequencies and are transmitted from Gunung Ulu Kali, Selangor and Kajang, Selangor.

There are a few types of radio stations operating in Selangor, namely, commercial radio stations, local community radio stations, federal government-owned radio stations, and specialised radio stations. Commercial radio stations available in Selangor are operated by media companies such as Astro Radio, Star Media Radio Group, Media Prima, Suara Johor and BFM Media. Local community radio stations are only available in certain regions. For example, UFM (93.6) operated by Universiti Teknologi MARA is only available in Shah Alam, Klang, and Petaling Jaya, while Putra FM (90.7) operated by Universiti Putra Malaysia is only available in Serdang and Seri Kembangan. Both radio stations target university students.

The nine Radio Televisyen Malaysia (RTM) radio networks available are Klasik FM, Muzik FM, Ai FM, Traxx FM, Minnal FM, Asyik FM, Selangor FM, KLFM, and Pahang FM. There are three specialised radio stations as well, namely IKIM.fm (91.5) operated by IKIM, Salam FM (102.5) operated by JAKIM, and Bernama Radio (93.9) operated by BERNAMA. The regions of Selangor that border other states can also receive two other Radio Televisyen Malaysia (RTM) radio stations; Perak FM (89.6 MHz/95.6 MHz; Selangor-Perak border) and Negeri FM (92.6 MHz; Selangor-Negeri Sembilan border).

Full list of radio stations available in Selangor:

Frequency	Station	Operator
87.7 MHz; 98.3 MHz; 5.965 kHz SW	Radio Klasik	RTM
88.1 MHz	8FM	Media Prima
88.5 MHz; 95.3 MHz	Nasional FM	RTM
88.9 MHz	goXuan	Astro Radio
89.6 MHz; 95.6 MHz	Perak FM	RTM
89.7 MHz; 106.7 MHz	Ai FM	RTM
89.9 MHz	BFM 89.9	BFM Media
90.3 MHz; 100.1 MHz; 7.295 kHz SW	TraXX FM	RTM
90.7 MHz	Putra FM	Universiti Putra Malaysia
91.1 MHz; 102.5 MHz; 6.050 kHz SW	Asyik FM	RTM
91.5 MHz	Radio IKIM	Institut Kemajuan Islam Malaysia (IKIM)
92.3 MHz; 96.3 MHz	Minnal FM	RTM
92.6 MHz	Negeri FM	RTM
92.9 MHz	Hitz	Astro Radio
93.6 MHz	UFM	Universiti Teknologi MARA
93.9 MHz	Bernama Radio	Bernama
94.5 MHz	Mix	Astro Radio
95.8 MHz	Fly FM	Media Prima
96.7 MHz	Sinar	Astro Radio
97.2 MHz	KL FM	RTM
97.6 MHz	Hot FM	Media Prima
98.8 MHz	988 FM	Star Media Radio Group
99.3 MHz	Raaga	Astro Radio
100.9 MHz	Selangor FM	RTM
101.3 MHz	Buletin FM	Media Prima
101.8 MHz	My	Astro Radio
103.0 MHz	Melody	Astro Radio
103.3 MHz	Era	Astro Radio
104.1 MHz	Best FM	Suara Johor Sdn Bhd
104.9 MHz	Zayan	Astro Radio
105.3 MHz	Suria	Star Media Radio Group
105.7 MHz	Lite	Astro Radio
106.0 MHz	City Plus FM	Ooga X Sdn Bhd
107.5 MHz	Pahang FM	RTM
107.9 MHz	RAKITA	

=== Newspapers ===
Mainstream newspapers in Selangor are:

- Berita Harian (in Bahasa Malaysia)
- Utusan Malaysia (in Bahasa Malaysia)
- Kosmo! (in Bahasa Malaysia)
- Harian Metro (in Bahasa Malaysia)
- Sinar Harian (in Bahasa Malaysia)
- Selangor Kini (in Bahasa Malaysia)
- New Straits Times (in English)
- The Star (in English)
- The Malay Mail (in English)
- The Sun (in English)
- Nanyang Siang Pau (in Mandarin)
- Sin Chew Daily (in Mandarin)
- China Press (in Mandarin)
- Malaysia Nanban (in Tamil)
- Tamil Nesan (in Tamil)
- Makkal Osai (in Tamil)
- Harakah (in Bahasa Malaysia and English). This newspaper is owned by the Pan-Malaysian Islamic Party
- Suara Keadilan. This newspaper is owned by People's Justice Party, a major party in the Pakatan Harapan ruling coalition.

== Notable people ==
- Mokhtar Dahari (1953–1991), former professional footballer
- Elyana (born 1987), singer and actress
- Liza Hanim (born 1979), singer and actress
- Razarudin Husain (born 1963), current IGP of the Royal Malaysian Police
- Safee Sali (born 1984), former professional footballer
- Acryl Sani Abdullah Sani (born 1961), 13th IGP of the Royal Malaysian Police
- Hafizh Syahrin (born 1994), motorcycle racer

== Image gallery ==
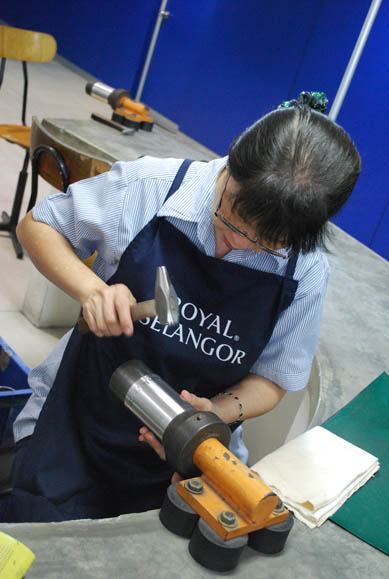
Royal Selangor Pewter

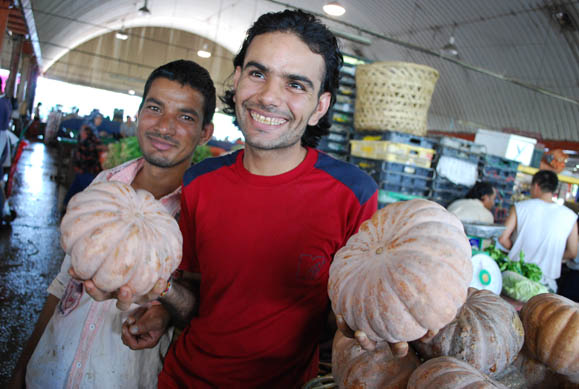
Bangladeshi workers in Pasar Borong Selayang

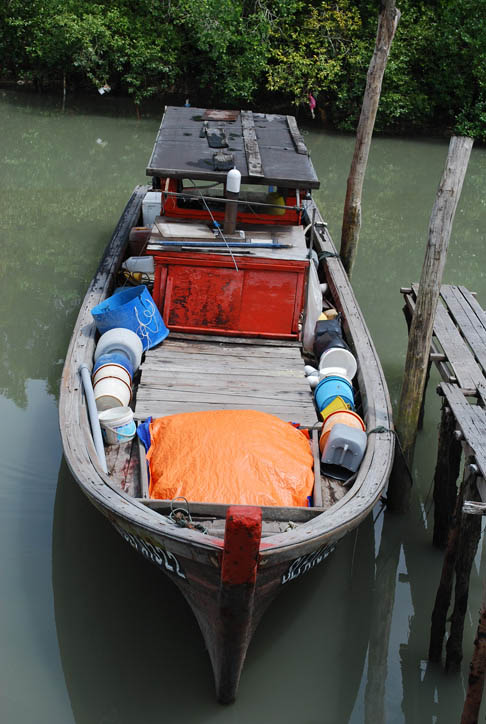
Boat in Pulau Ketam

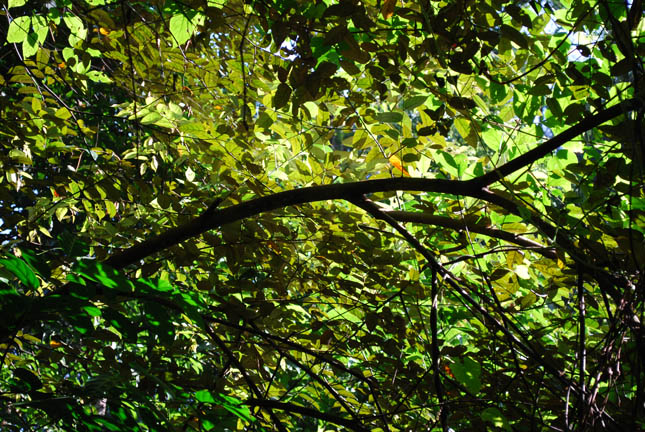
Forest Research Institute Malaysia (FRIM)

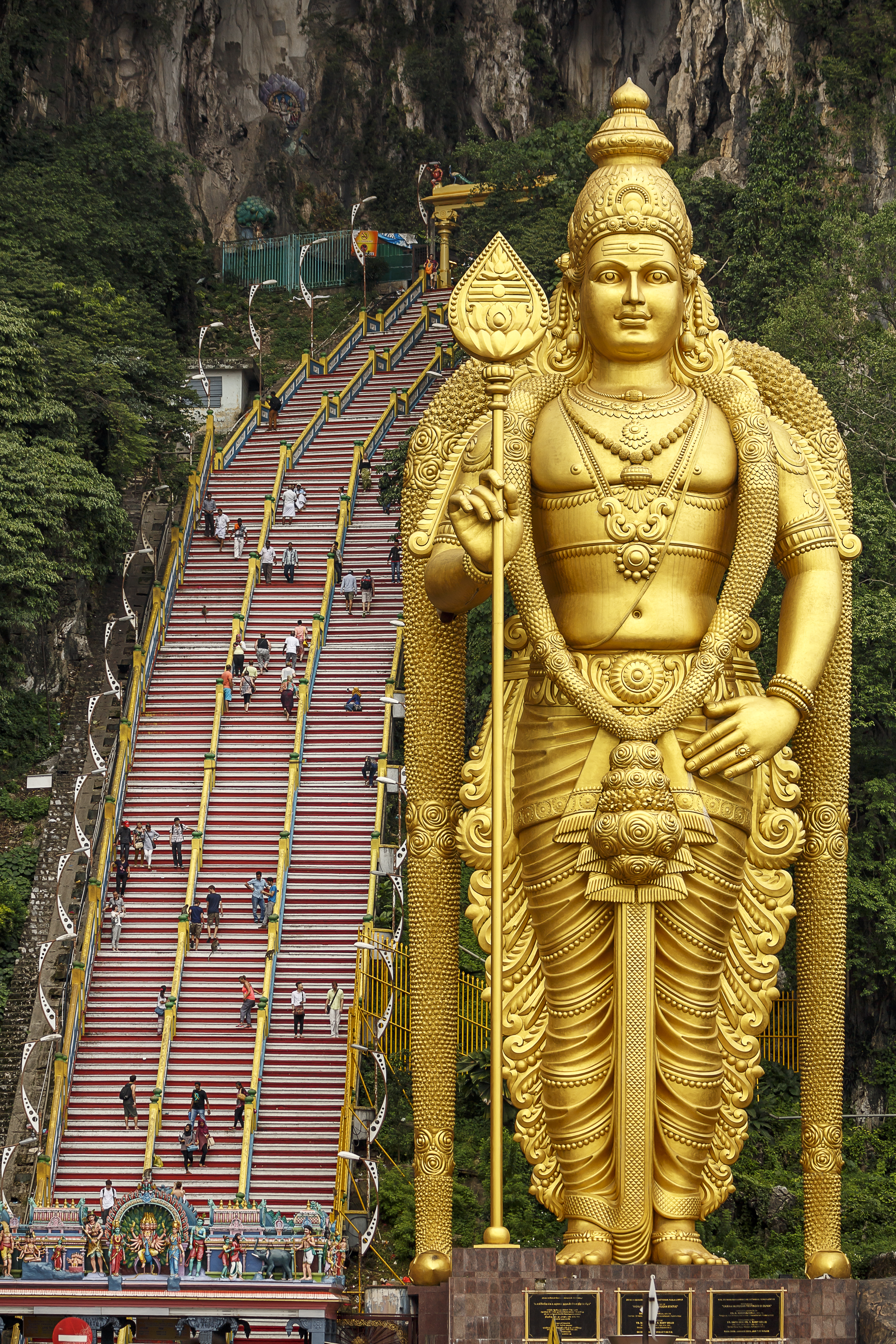
Batu Caves

== See also ==
- Selangor Sign Language
