= Atim =

Atim may refer to:

== People ==
=== Middle name ===
- Agnes Atim Apea, Ugandan social entrepreneur and politician
- Angela Atim Lakor (born 1982), Ugandan activist
- Beatrice Atim Anywar (born 1964), Ugandan politician
- Cecilia Barbra Atim Ogwal (1946-2024), Ugandan politician

=== Surname ===
- Chris Bukari Atim (born 1953), one of the seven original members of the PNDC
- Joy Atim (born 1968), Ugandan businesswomen
- Sheila Atim (born 1991), Ugandan-British actress

== See also ==
- Atim Ka-mihkosit Reserve, an Indian reserve in Saskatchewan, Canada
