= Global Council on Inequality, AIDS, and Pandemics =

Global council of experts on inequality and pandemics

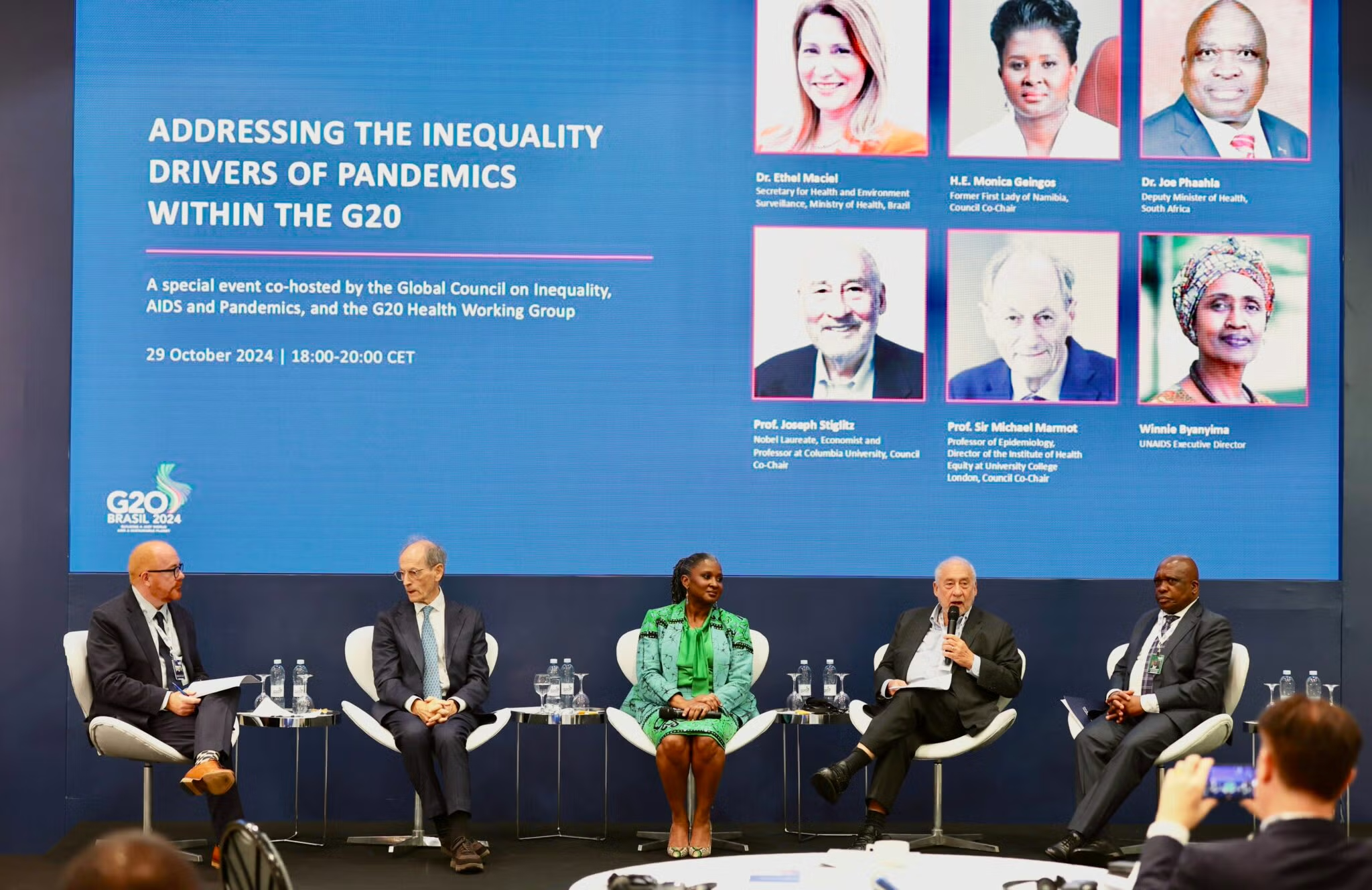
- Global council event at the G20 Health Ministerial, Rio De Janeiro, Brazil
- Formation: 2024
- Type: Global expert council
- Headquarters: Geneva, Switzerland
- Coordinates: 46.208°N 6.139°E
- Region served: Global
- Co-chairs: Joseph Stiglitz, Monica Geingos, Michael Marmot
- Key people: Winnie Byanyima, Helen Clark, María Fernanda Espinosa, Adeeba Kamarulzaman, Peter Sands, Chadchart Sittipunt, Richard Lusimbo, Javier Padilla Bernáldez, Joe Phaahla, Imraan Valodia
- Parent organization: UNAIDS
- Website: inequalitycouncil.org

The Global Council on Inequality, AIDS, and Pandemics is a group of prominent experts convened by UNAIDS to address the intersection of global inequality and the increasing frequency and prolonged nature of pandemics. The Global Council is co-chaired by Nobel-Prize-winning economist Professor Joseph Stiglitz, entrepreneur and former First Lady of Namibia Monica Geingos, and renowned epidemiologist Professor Sir Michael Marmot who chaired the WHO Commission on the Social Determinants of Health. Members of the Council include a former head of state, current and former ministers of health, and prominent academics. The Global Council has engaged with G20 Health Ministers meetings in Brazil in 2024 and South Africa in 2025. Members of the Council published research on the effects of inequality on the AIDS pandemic globally and specifically in cities. They have also published op-eds and other pieces promoting an alternative to standard pandemic preparedness that takes inequality into account.

In 2025, the Global Council released a report documenting the "Inequality-Pandemic Cycle" that described the ways that inequality makes pandemics more likely, causes pandemics to last longer and have bigger impact, and how pandemics increase inequality, fueling a cycle. The report was delivered at the G20 Ministers of Health meeting in Polokwane, South Africa as well as an event chaired by President Cyril Ramaphosa in Cape Town November 2025. The report warned that inequality is driving pandemics and called on governments to take action on financial space and debt, access to affordable vaccines and medicines, social determinants of pandemics, and community-led efforts as part of preparing for future pandemics.

== Membership ==
Members of the Global Council	
Winnie Byanyima	Executive Director of UNAIDS
Joseph E. Stiglitz	Nobel prize winning economist and professor at Columbia University
Monica Geingos	Former First Lady, Namibia
Michael G. Marmot	Professor of Epidemiology and Director of the Institute of Health Equity at University College London
Nísia Trindade	Former Minister of Health, Brazil
John Ataguba	Executive Director of the African Health Economics and Policy Association
Helen Clark	Former Prime Minister of New Zealand and former Administrator of UNDP
María Fernanda Espinosa Garcés	Former President of the United Nations General Assembly
Adeeba Kamarulzaman	Pro Vice Chancellor and President of Monash University Malaysia
Matthew M. Kavanagh	Director & Associate Professor, Georgetown University Center for Global Health Policy & Politics
Ingrid T. Katz	Director of the Yale Institute for Global Health
Ruth Laibon Masha	CEO of the National Syndemic Diseases Control Council in Kenya
Richard Lusimbo	Human rights activist
Javier Padilla Bernáldez	Secretary of State for Health, Spain
Joe Phaahla	Former Minister of Health of South Africa, Current Deputy Minister of Health
Erika Placella	Head of Health, Federal Department of Foreign Affairs, Swiss Agency for Development and Cooperation
Achal Prabhala	Director, AccessIBSA project
Peter Sands	Executive Director of The Global Fund to Fight AIDS, Tuberculosis and Malaria
Chadchart Sittipunt	Governor of Bangkok
Imraan Valodia	Professor of Economics; Pro Vice-Chancellor: Climate, Sustainability and Inequality, University of the Witwatersrand, Johannesburg

== Reception and Reaction ==
Minister of Health of South Africa welcomed the report and its findings, stating "When I saw the picture in front of the report, I saw South Africa. We are not necessarily the poorest country on this continent, but we are certainly the most unequal in the whole world." At the launch of the report Sir Michael Marmot stated "The rich had a very good pandemic" which generated headlines in global health publications.

However, some critics complained that worrying about inequality "takes focus away" from reforms and preparedness efforts needed for future pandemics and questioned the report's methodology.
