= John Ataguba =

Professor John Ele-Ojo Ataguba
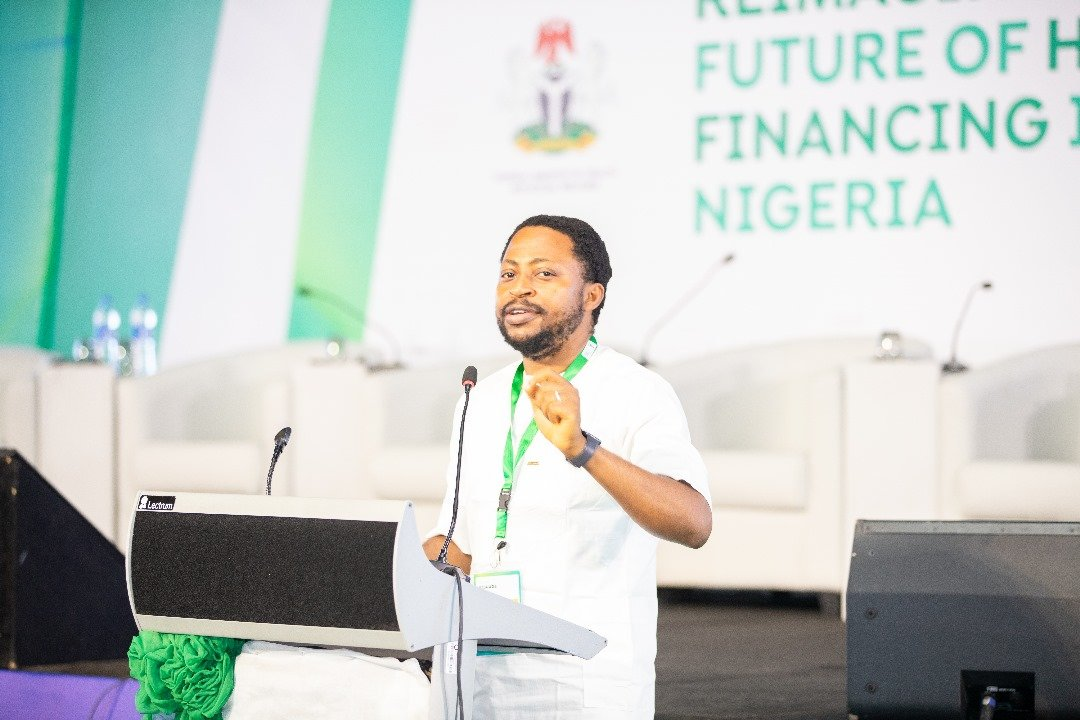
- John Ataguba at Reimagining the Future of Health Financing in Nigeria, Abjua
- Occupation: Economist

Academic background
- Education: PhD, Economics, University of Cape Town BSc, Economics, University of Nigeria, Nsukka
- Alma mater: University of Cape Town

Academic work
- Discipline: Economics
- Sub-discipline: Health Economics
- Institutions: African Health Economics and Policy Association University of Manitoba

Professor John E. Ataguba is a leading Nigerian health economist, serving as the executive director of the African Health Economics and Policy Association. He also holds the Canada Research Chair in Health Economics at the University of Manitoba. He is also a founding member of the Global Council on Inequality, AIDS and Pandemics. Previously, he was the South African Research Chair in Health and Wealth (2018–2020), a Full Professor and Director of the Health Economics Unit at the University of Cape Town, South Africa. His work focuses mainly on health financing, equity, and universal health coverage (UHC), particularly in low- and middle-income countries and in Africa.

== Research Focus ==
His research examines how health systems are funded, studying health insurance schemes, including social health insurance and tax-based financing, and how they affect access to care. A major theme in his work is equity — whether poor and vulnerable populations are protected from financial hardship when they need health services. He has published influential research on catastrophic health expenditure in particular—when health costs push people into poverty.

== Prominence ==
Ataguba is among the most prominent African health economists in the field. He has been recognized across multiple countries in the region and globally.

=== South Africa ===
He is a winner of the prestigious TW Kambule-NSTF award, known as the "Science Oscars" of South Africa. He published the first comprehensive analysis of health inequalities in South Africa, showing that the poor suffers a disproportionately in the country.

=== Nigeria ===
Ataguba is originally from Nigieria and has been a leading voice in health financing in the country. In 2025, Ataguba played a key role in a high-profile effort to create alternative ideas to allow the country's health system to shift away from reliance on direct payments by patients, which ataguba has described as unsustainable and inequitable. Ataguba was asked by the government to help convene the National Health Financing Policy Dialogue from the Health Insurance Authority.

=== Globally ===
Ataguba was appointed executive director of the African Health Economics and Policy Association, the umbrella professional association for health economists and policymakers in Africa, a role that positions him at the forefront of health economics on the continent.

In 2020, Professor Ataguba was invited to address the G20 Health Ministers in South Africa on Universal Health Coverage alongside nobel laureate Joseph Stiglitz.

He was a Mellon-Mandela fellow at Harvard University.

In 2022, Canada expanded its funding to support research in the country and announced C$151 million to fund new Canada Research Chairs across the country. Ataguba was recruited from the University of Cape Town to take one of these prestigious posts.
