= Lucy Akello =

Ugandan social worker and politician (born 1980)

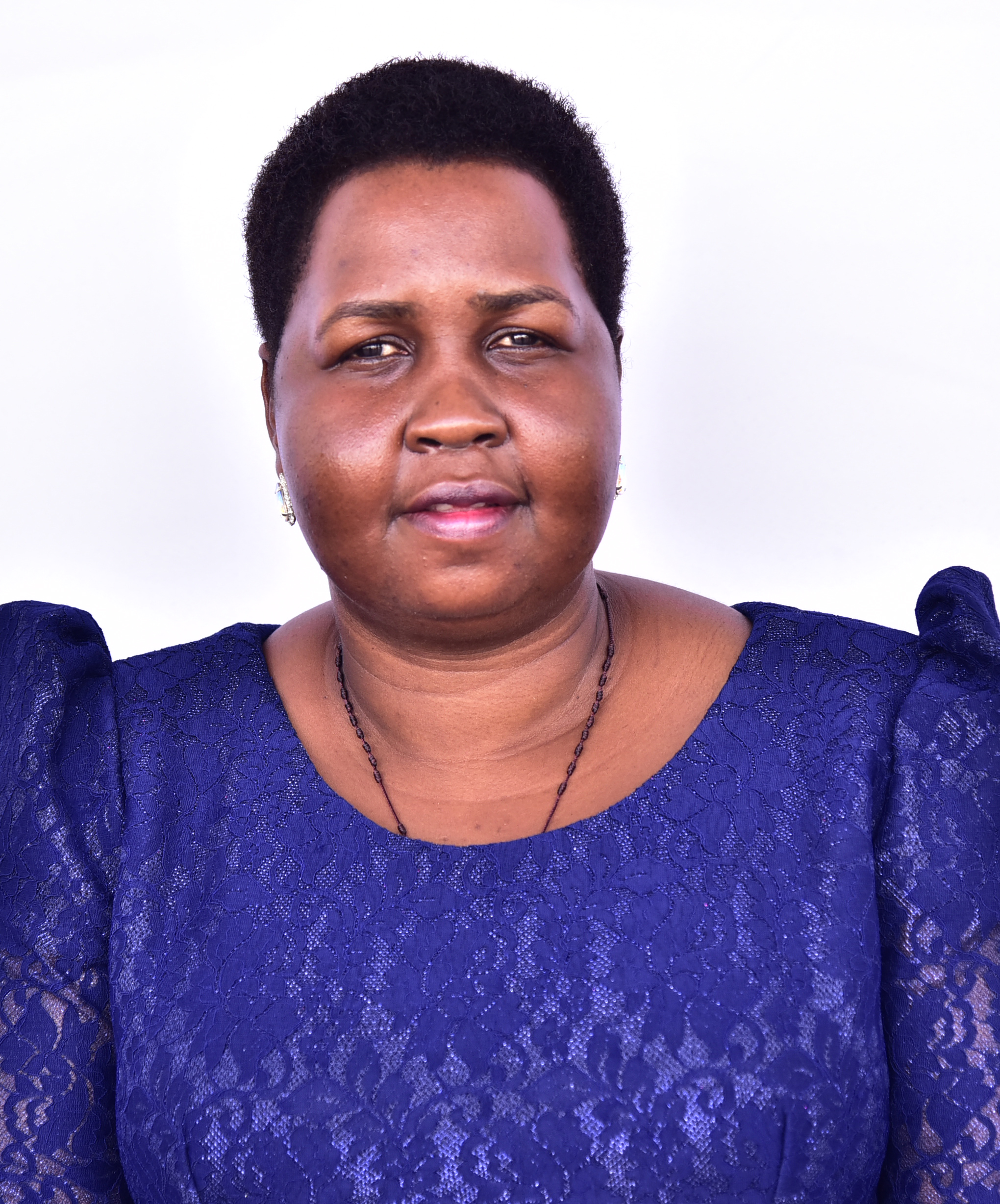
- Born: 9 October 1980 (age 46); Amuru District, Northern Region, Uganda
- Citizenship: Ugandan
- Education: Makerere University (Bachelor of Arts in Social Science); Uganda Management Institute (Certificate in Database Management Systems); Uganda Martyrs University (Master of Arts in Development Stufdies)
- Occupations: Social worker & politician
- Years active: 2005 to present
- Employer(s): Justice & Peace Commission (JPC); Amuru District; Parliament of Uganda
- Known for: Politics
- Title: Honourable
- Political party: Forum for Democratic Change (FDC)
- Parent: John Obina

Lucy Akello (born 9 October 1980) is a Ugandan social worker and politician, who served as the member of parliament for the Amuru District Women's Constituency in the 10th Parliament (2016 to 2021). She was elected back to the eleventh Parliament representing Amuru District under FDC political party. She is a member of the opposition Forum for Democratic Change (FDC), and she serves as the shadow minister for labour, gender and social development.

== Early life and education ==
Akello was born on 9 October 1980, in Lamogi sub-county, Amuru District, in the Northern Region of Uganda. Her father is John Obina, a lecturer at Kyambogo University.

Akello attended Olwal Ocaja Primary School, later she attended Lacor Primary School, Mary Immaculate Primary School Gulu and Kyambogo Primary School for her Primary Leaving Certificate. She then attended Iganga Secondary School for her O-Level studies and then UgandaMartyrs' Secondary School Namugongo, where she completed her A-Level education. She was admitted to Makerere University, in Kampala, where she graduated in 2004, with a Bachelor of Arts in Social Science. Later, in 2011, she obtained a Master of Arts in Development studies, from Uganda Martyrs University in Nkozi, Wakiso District.

== Career ==
=== Early career ===
In 2005, Akello was hired by Justice & Peace Commission (JPC), a local non-government organization within the Catholic Church that promotes peace and reconciliation in war-torn Northern Uganda. She worked there for ten years, beginning as a program officer, then as a program manager and from 2006 until 2014, as the executive director. Her focus was on human rights, land rights, women rights and children's rights.

=== Political career ===
In October 2014, Betty Bigombe, the Amuru District Women's member of parliament resigned to take up an appointment at the World Bank, in Washington, DC. A special election was organised to fill her seat in December 2014. Akello, running on the opposition FDC political party ticket, beat seven other candidates and won. During the 2016 parliamentary election, she ran successfully, again on the FDC ticket. She spoke 30 times during the first year of the 10th Parliament.

She served in the 11th parliament of Uganda as a woman representative for Amuru district under the Forum for Democratic Change (FDC) party.

She was re-elected to the 12th parliament as a woman representative for Amurur district under the Forum for Democratic Change (FDC) party.

=== Anti-Homosexuality Act ===
Akello was one of MPs who called for the renewal of the Anti-Homosexuality Act. This act, restricting freedom of speech on LGBT civil rights and criminalized homosexual acts, was ruled invalid by Constitutional Court of Uganda in 2014. She succeeded in her goal as the Anti-Homosexuality Act was passed in May 2023. The act violates The Universal Declaration of Human Rights and International Covenant on Civil and Political Rights adopted by United Nations General Assembly as it infringes on freedom of speech and implements the death penalty.

She has also spoken against rights of this part of population at international events, for example the event in Italy organized by World Congress of Families in 2019 .

== Personal life ==
Akello is a married mother.

== See also ==
- Angelline Osegge
- Winnie Kiiza
- Joy Atim
