= Star Blanket 83C =

Indian reserve in Saskatchewan, Canada

Coordinates: 51°00′33″N 103°39′28″W

- Indian reserve
- Star Blanket Indian Reserve No. 83C
- Location in Saskatchewan
- First Nation: Star Blanket
- Country: Canada
- Province: Saskatchewan

Area
  - Total: 384 ha (950 acres)

Population (2016)
  - Total: 0
  - Density: 0.0/km^{2} (0.0/sq mi)

Star Blanket 83C is an Indian reserve of the Star Blanket Cree Nation in Saskatchewan. It is about 18 kilometres (11 mi) north-east of Lipton. In the 2016 Canadian Census, it recorded a population of 0 living in 1 of its 1 total private dwellings.

== See also ==
- List of Indian reserves in Saskatchewan
