= Lim Boo Liat =

Malaysian zoologist (1926–2020)

- Born: August 21, 1926; Klang, Selangor, Federated Malay States, British Malaya (now Malaysia)
- Died: July 11, 2020 (aged 93); Cheras, Kuala Lumpur, Malaysia
- Education: University of Aberdeen; University of Science, Malaysia

Lim Boo Liat (21 August 1926 – 11 July 2020) was a Malaysian zoologist whose pioneering work revealed the biological diversity of the Malay Peninsula and Borneo. He was a conservationist and a strong advocate for the preservation of the region's natural heritage.

Lim was a prolific researcher, and authored over 300 scientific papers and multiple books. He was bestowed several honors during his long career, including being the first Southeast Asian to receive Honorary Membership in the American Society of Mammalogists, and winning the Merdeka Award in 2013.

== Early years ==
Lim Boo Liat was born 21 August 1926 in Klang, Selangor. Nature lessons in school inspired a love for the outdoors, and he spent time in his youth collecting plants and insects.

Lim was sixteen years old when World War II came to Malaya, disrupting his studies; he worked odd jobs to support his family. He traveled to Carey Island and set up machinery to harvest salt from sea water. During his time on the island, he learned to identify animals from the indigenous people, the Mah Meri.

== Career ==
Although lacking formal education, the zoological knowledge Lim learned on Carey Island provided the opportunity to take a temporary lab assistant position at the Institute for Medical Research (IMR) in Kuala Lumpur after World War II. His first assignment was studying scrub typhus, carried from mites to rats. Further studies also focused on small mammals and parasites, and involved travel throughout Southeast Asia under the auspices of the Bishop Museum. This included carrying out an ecological study of the fauna of Batu Caves. During this time, he also helped found the National Zoo of Malaysia and in the 1950s, helped reestablish the Malaysian Nature Society after a hiatus caused by World War II.

Lim took a three-year break to earn his master's degree in the late 1960s. He returned to the IMR as a zoologist in 1972, heading the IMR's Medical Ecology Division.

In 1977, Lim became the head of the Vector Biology Control Research Unit of the World Health Organization in Jakarta, Indonesia. His work there included research on plague, malaria control, and rodent control. He worked at the WHO until his retirement in 1987.

After his retirement, Lim became the honorary consultant on zoology for the Department of Wildlife and National Parks Peninsular Malaysia, helping to establish a research laboratory for small animals. Throughout his career, he was an author on over 300 scientific papers and wrote multiple books, including Poisonous Snakes of Peninsula Malaysia (1979), Orang Asli Animal Tales (1981), and Turtles of Borneo (1999).

== Education ==
In 1959 Lim received a Sino-British Fellowship Trust Award and spent a year and a half studying animal ecology and the taxonomy of mammals under Charles S. Elton at Oxford University and George Dunnet at Aberdeen University. Lim received a Medical Research Council Fellowship in 1969 to complete his master's degree in science from the University of Aberdeen.

He was the first person to be awarded a Ph.D. from Universiti Sains Malaysia in 1977.

== Death and legacy ==
Lim died at his home in Cheras on 11 July 2020. He was 93.

He was the fourth Asian and first Southeast Asian to be awarded honorary membership to the American Society of Mammalogists, "conferred in recognition of a distinguished career in service to mammalogy". Lim had multiple species named after him, including snake Oligodon booliati, protozoa Sarcocytis booliati, frog Kalophrynus limbooliati, flea Medwayellia limi, chigger Babiangia booliati, and parasitic worms Helimonella limbooliati, Plasmodium booliati, and Brienlia booliati.

== Awards and recognition ==
- 1959 Sino-British Fellowship Trust Award from the British Council
- 1978 Sandosham Gold Medal from the Malaysian Society of Parasitology and Tropical Medicine
- 1995 Science and Technology Award from the Malaysia Toray Science Foundation
- 2003 Honorary Member of the American Society of Mammalogists
- 2007 Elected Fellow of the Akademi Sains Malaysia
- 2007 Spallanzani Award from the North American Society for Bat Research
- 2013 Merdeka Award, environment category
