= A. Mangalam =

Malaysian activist (1926–2023)

- Born: A. Mangalam A/P S. Iyaswamy Iyer; 17 May 1926; Singapore, Straits Settlements
- Died: 10 June 2023 (aged 97); Assunta Hospital, Petaling Jaya, Malaysia
- Other name: Mother Mangalam
- Education: Raffles Girls' School; Saradhamani Girls' School
- Office: Cofounder of Pure Life Society

Datin Paduka A. Mangalam A/P S. Iyaswamy Iyer (17 May 1926 – 10 June 2023), known as Mother Mangalam, was a Singaporean-born Malaysian nun and human rights activist who was the co-founder and life chairman of the Pure Life Society. She was known as the "Malaysian Mother Teresa".

== Early life and education ==
Mother Mangalam was born in 1926 in Singapore. She went to Raffles Girls' School and Saradhamani Girls' School. She obtained a Cambridge School Certificate at the Canossian Convent.

== Career ==
Mangalam came to Malaya in 1948. She passed a teacher's training course and taught at a Tamil school in Bangsar, Kuala Lumpur.

Mangalam, along with her mentor, Swami Satyananda, founded the Pure Life Society in 1949. She was called "Sister Mangalam" when she started working for the foundation. The title "Mother" was bestowed upon her in 1985 by the society.

Mangalam authored three books, Dew Drops on a Lily Pad, History of Kuala Lumpur Schools in Tamil, and Mother. She was a publisher of Dharma Quarterly since 1961.

Mangalam was appointed a member of Moral Education Committee of the Curriculum Development Centre. She was also appointed a member of the National Advisory Council for the Integration of Women in Development (NACIWID) by the Ministry of National Unity and Social Development.

Mangalam served as a Vice President of the Malaysia Inter-Religious Organization. In 1986, she began serving as an Advisor for the Inter-Faith Spiritual Fellowship.

Mangalam received the Pingat Jasa Kebangsaan from the Sultan of Selangor in 1955, the Tun Fatimah Gold Medal from the National Council of Women's Organizations in 1977 and the Kesatria Mangku Negara by the Yang di Pertuan Agong in 2002.

She was a 2010 recipient of the Merdeka Award in the category of Education and Community.

== Death ==
Mangalam died on 10 June 2023, aged 97, at Assunta Hospital, Petaling Jaya, Malaysia.
