= Annabel Gallop =

Annabel Gallop FBA
- Born: 5 August 1961 (age 65); Winchester, United Kingdom
- Education: University of Bristol (BA, 1982) School of Oriental and African Studies, University of London (MA, 1985 and PhD, 2002)
- Occupation: Southeast Asia specialist
- Awards: Merdeka Award

Annabel Teh Gallop FBA (born 5 August 1961) is a specialist in Southeast Asia, and is Head of the Southeast Asia Section at the British Library. In 2022, Gallop was awarded the Merdeka Award for her historic manuscripts written in the Malay language for the past three decades.

== Early life ==
Gallop was born 5 August 1961 in Winchester, the daughter of Christopher Hugh Gallop and Teh Siok Lay. She attended Sufri Bolkiah English School in Tutong, Brunei, Wadhurst College, and Cranbrook School. She received her BSc from the University of Bristol in 1982. She then studied at the School of Oriental and African Studies, University of London where she received her MA in 1985 and PhD in 2002.

She married Jonathan Del Mar in 1992; they have two sons.

== Career ==
Gallop was a senior producer for the Indonesian and Malay section of the BBC World Service from 1985–86. She joined the British Library in 1986, and has held the positions of Curator for Maritime Southeast Asia, and Head of the Southeast Asia Section. Her research focuses on the British Library's Malay collections: writing traditions, book cultures and the art of the Qur’an in Southeast Asia and the Indian Ocean world; Malay and Indonesian manuscripts, letters, documents and seals, and comparative Islamic diplomatics.

She curated the exhibitions "Early Malay Printing, 1603-1900", "Golden Letters: Writing Traditions of Indonesia" (1991) and "The Legacy of the Malay Letter" (1994). She has done particular research on Malay seals, including her PhD (2002) on this subject, and the catalogue Malay Seals from the Islamic World of Southeast Asia (2019). She co-directed the British Academy-funded research project "Islam, Trade and Politics across the Indian Ocean" (2009-2012), which investigated Ottoman links with Southeast Asia.

She received the Darjah Setia DiRaja Kedah in 2014 and was elected as a Fellow of the British Academy in 2019.

== Selected publications ==
- Malay Seals from the Islamic World of Southeast Asia (2019)
- (ed. with Andrew Peacock) From Anatolia to Aceh: Ottomans, Turks and Southeast Asia (2015)
- (with M.C. Ricklefs and P. Voohoeve) Indonesian manuscripts in Great Britain: a catalogue of manuscripts in Indonesian languages in British public collections (2014)
- (with Venetia Porter) Lasting impressions: seals from the Islamic world (2012)
- The legacy of the Malay letter: Warisan Warkah Melayu (1994)
- Early views of Indonesia: Pemandangan Indonesia di masa lampau (1995)
- (with Bernard Arps) Golden letters: writing traditions of Indonesia / Surat emas: budaya tulis di Indonesia (1991)
- "Fakes or fancies? Some ‘problematic’ Islamic manuscripts from Southeast Asia" in Manuscript Cultures (2017)
- "The early use of seals in the Malay world", Bulletin de l'École Française d'Extrême-Orient (2016)
- A Jawi sourcebook for the study of Malay palaeography and orthography (2015)
