= Star Blanket 83 =

Indian reserve in Saskatchewan, Canada

Coordinates: 50°57′41″N 103°22′42″W

- Indian reserve
- Star Blanket Indian Reserve No. 83
- Location in Saskatchewan
- First Nation: Star Blanket
- Country: Canada
- Province: Saskatchewan

Area
  - Total: 5,611.9 ha (13,867 acres)

Population (2016)
  - Total: 175
  - Density: 3.12/km^{2} (8.08/sq mi)
- Community Well-Being Index: 50

Star Blanket 83 is an Indian reserve of the Star Blanket Cree Nation in Saskatchewan. It is about 18 kilometres (11 mi) north-east of Fort Qu'Appelle. In the 2016 Canadian Census, it recorded a population of 175 living in 48 of its 59 total private dwellings. In the same year, its Community Well-Being index was calculated at 50 of 100, compared to 58.4 for the average First Nations community and 77.5 for the average non-Indigenous community.

== See also ==
- List of Indian reserves in Saskatchewan
