= Just Faaland =

Norwegian economist (1922–2017)

- Born: January 25, 1922; Tromsø, Norway
- Died: February 17, 2017 (aged 95); Bergen, Norway
- Education: University of Oslo University of Oxford
- Occupation: Political Economist
- Years active: 1949-1988
- Known for: Malaysian New Economic Policy
- Notable work: Growth and Ethnic Inequality: Malaysia's New Economic Policy 1990 The Political Economy of Development 1986 Population and the World Economy in the 21st Century 1982 Aid and Influence: The Case of Bangladesh 1981
- Spouse: Judith Lockert Faaland (married 1945)
- Parents: Josef Tobiassen Faaland (father); Elna Faaland (mother)
- Awards: Merdeka Award
- Honours: Knight of the Royal Norwegian Order of St. Olav Honorary title Tan Sri Honorary Commander of the Order of Loyalty to the Crown of Malaysia

Just Faaland (January 25, 1922 – February 17, 2017) was a Norwegian political economist.

== Background and education ==
Justus Faaland was born in Tromsø, Norway in 1922, to Josef Tobiassen Faaland and Elna Faaland. He grew up in Oslo and studied actuarial science at the University of Oslo. Faaland's father Josef was a political prisoner in Bredtveit Prison Nazi concentration camp in 1942. Faaland's actuarial science studies were interrupted on November 30, 1943 when the University was occupied by the German Nazi government and 650 students were arrested. Faaland was detained at Stavern, Norway from 30 November 1943 to 7 January 1944 and then sent to the Buchenwald concentration camp. Faaland was held prisoner at the Buchenwald concentration camp (Prisoner number: 39315) and the Sennheim camp an annex of the Natzweiler-Struthof concentration camp and again at Buchenwald from January 1944 until liberation on April 11, 1945 by American troops. Upon his return to Norway in May 1945, Faaland resumed his actuarial degree and then studied economics under Ragnar Frisch. took the actuarial exam in 1945, and then studied at Oxford.

After further studies in Economics at the University of Oxford and a year as a research fellow at the Department of Social Economics at the University of Oslo, Faaland joined the Marshall Plan Organisation for European Economic Co-operation (OEEC) in Paris in 1949. Later he worked for a number of international institutions including the World Bank, ILO, IFAD, FAO, WFP, UNDP, and the Asian Development Bank. Faaland was based as a development researcher at the Chr. Michelsen Institute (CMI) from 1952 to 2017 serving as director for 28 years. With the political scientist Stein Rokkan he initiated and developed broader research programmes and employed more people in the 1950s and in 1961 they defined research programs in international economics and comparative politics. In 1965, the Development Action and Research Programme (DERAP), a development economics project on growth problems in developing countries was formally established. In the early 1980s, Faaland established a human rights programme which soon grew to become the other main focus of CMI's social science research.

Faaland worked as an adviser in Pakistan (1957–1960), Malaysia (1968–1970) and Bangladesh (1972–1974). Faaland was one of the individuals responsible for the formulation of the Malaysian New Economic Policy. He was also the director general of the International Food Policy Research Institute. and chairman of the UN Committee for Development Planning (1999-2000). Faaland formally retired in 1988 and died on February 17, 2017 in Bergen, at the age of 95.

== Honors ==
- Norway: Knight of the Royal Norwegian Order of St. Olav
- Norway: Honorary doctorate from the University of Bergen
- Malaysia: Honorary Doctorate University of Malaya
- Malaysia: Honorary title Tan Sri
- Malaysia: Merdeka Award for Outstanding Contribution to the People of Malaysia
- Malaysia: Honorary Commander of the Order of Loyalty to the Crown of Malaysia (P.S.M.) (2002)
