= Jomo Kwame Sundaram =

Malaysian economist (born 1952)

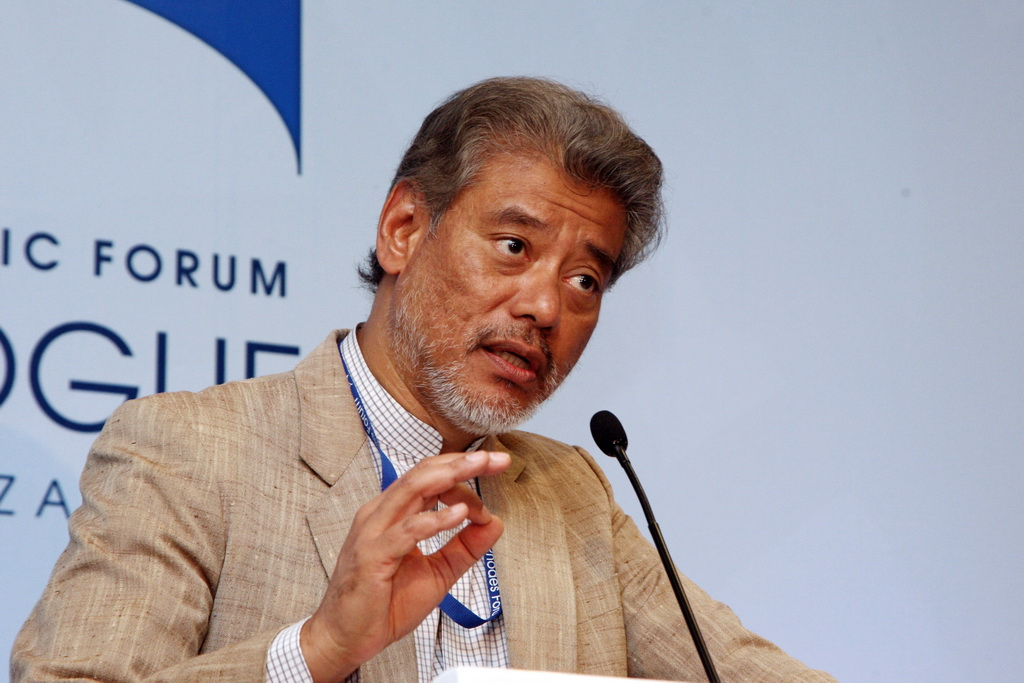
Jomo at the World Public Forum "Dialogue of Civilizations" in 2012

Jomo Kwame Sundaram (Tamil: ஜோமோ குவாமே சுந்தரம், romanized: Jōmō Kuvāmē Cuntaram) (born 11 December 1952) is a Malaysian economist who currently serves as research advisor at the Khazanah Research Institute, a visiting fellow at the Initiative for Policy Dialogue at Columbia University, and an adjunct professor at the International Islamic University Malaysia (IIUM).

== Early life and education ==
Jomo was born into an ethnically mixed family, his mother Chua Sack Liang being Chinese and his father Shree Kaliana Sundaram being Indian; he was named after African anti-colonial leaders Jomo Kenyatta and Kwame Nkrumah. His father was an engineer while his mother was a bookkeeper.

Jomo's early education began at Westlands Primary School (1959–1963), Penang Free School (1964–1966), and the Royal Military College (1967–1970). In 1970, he was listed as a delegate for Malaysia at the World Youth Forum. Jomo graduated cum laude in economics from Yale University and obtained a Master of Public Administration (MPA) degree from Harvard University in 1974. He completed his PhD at Harvard in 1977, after which he returned to Malaysia to teach at the Science University of Malaysia (USM).

== Personal life ==
Born a Hindu, Jomo converted to Islam in 1985.

Besides Malay and English, he has learnt eight languages: Spanish, French, Russian, Tamil, Mandarin, Hokkien, Teochew, Indonesian.

== Career and UN works ==
Jomo was the founding director of the Independent Institute of Social Analysis (INSAN) from 1978 to 2004 and editor of the bilingual magazine Nadi Insan (1979–1983).

In mid-1982, Jomo joined the University of Malaya, where he served as a faculty member until 2004. His academic career also included appointments as a visiting professor and fellow at Cambridge University (1987–88, 1991–92) under the British Academy program, a Fulbright Visiting Professor position at Cornell University (1993), and a senior research fellow role at the Asia Research Institute at the National University of Singapore (2004).

He was president of the Malaysian Social Science Association from 1996 to 2000 and convener of the first two International Malaysian Studies Conventions in 1997 and 1999. He chaired International Development Economics Associates between 2001 and 2004 and was a board member of the United Nations Research Institute.

Before the 1997-98 Asian financial crisis, he supported proposals for new capital account management measures, which were later introduced by the then Prime Minister Mahathir Mohamad. From 1989 to 1991, he was a member of the National Economic Consultative Council.

From 2006 to 2012, Jomo was Research Coordinator for the G24 Intergovernmental Group on International Monetary Affairs and Development. Between 2008 and 2009 he advised Miguel d'Escoto Brockmann, president of the 63rd United Nations General Assembly, and was also a member of the Stiglitz Commission of Experts on reforms of the international financial system.

He was Assistant Secretary-General for Economic Development in the United Nations Department of Economic and Social Affairs (DESA) from 2005 to 2012, and Assistant Director-General and Coordinator for Economic and Social Development at the Food and Agriculture Organization (FAO) from 2012 to 2015. From 2010 to 2012 he acted as the G20 “sherpa” to UN Secretary-General Ban Ki-Moon and from 2011 as the UN’s G20 finance deputy.

In 2022, he was interviewed by Frontline on the economic impact of the Russian invasion of Ukraine on the Global South, and in 2023, he appeared on Democracy Now! to discuss the role of institutions such as the World Bank in the climate crisis and global debt.

In 2024, Jomo was awarded the Outstanding Scholastic Achievement, a category under the Merdeka Award for contributions and advice in addressing economic issues both locally and worldwide.

== Malaysia Council of Eminent Persons and Economic Action Council ==
Following the 2018 Malaysian general election (GE14), Jomo was appointed to the five-member Council of Eminent Persons to advise the new Pakatan Harapan (PH) Federal Government. On February 11, 2019, he was also appointed to the Economic Action Council (EAC), chaired by Prime Minister Mahathir Mohamad.

== Books ==
Jomo has authored or edited more than 100 books, apart from research papers and popular articles.

=== Monographs ===
- Development and Population: Critique of Existing Theories. (1982)
- Early Labour: Children at Work on Malaysian Plantations. (With Josie Zaini, P. Ramasamy and Sumathy Suppiah) (1984)
- A Question of Class: Capital, the State and Uneven Development in Malaya. (1988)
- Development Policies and Income Inequality in Peninsular Malaysia. (with Ishak Shari) (1986)
- Mahathir's Economic Policies. (with others) (1989)
- Beyond 1990: Considerations for a New National Development Strategy. (1989)
- Beyond the New Economic Policy? Malaysia in the Nineties. (1990)
- Growth and Structural Change in the Malaysian Economy. (1990)
- The Way Forward? The Political Economy of Development Policy Reform in Malaysia. (1993)
- Trade Unions and the State in Peninsular Malaysia. (with Patricia Todd) (1994)
- U-Turn? Malaysian Economic Development Policies After 1990. (1994)
- Southeast Asia's Misunderstood Miracle: Industrial Policy and Economic Development in Thailand, Malaysia and Indonesia. (with others) (1997)
- Malaysia's Political Economy: Politics, Patronage and Profits. (with E.T. Gomez) (1999)
- Economic Considerations for a Renewed Nationalism. (1998)
- Economic Diversification and Primary Commodity Processing in the Second-tier Southeast Asian Newly Industrializing Countries. (with Michael Rock) (1998)
- Growth After The Asian Crisis: What Remains of the East Asian Model? (2001)
- Globalization, Liberalization and Equitable Development: Lessons from East Asia. (2003)
- Deforesting Malaysia: The Political Economy and Social Ecology of Agricultural Expansion and Commercial Logging. (with Chang Y. T., Khoo K. J. and others) (2004)
- M Way: Mahathir's Economic Legacy. (2004)
- Malaysian "Bail-Outs"? Capital Controls, Restructuring & Recovery in Malaysia. (with Wong Sook Ching and Chin Kok Fay) (2005)
- Law, Institutions and Malaysian Economic Development. (with Wong Sau Ngan) (2008)
- Labour Market Segmentation in Malaysian Services. (with H. L. Khong) (2010)
- Malaysia@50: Economic Development, Distribution, Disparities. (with Wee Chong Hui) (2014)

=== Edited volumes ===
- Development in the Eighties. (with H. Osman Rani and Ishak Shari) (1981)
- The Malaysian Economy and Finance. (with Sritua Arief) (1983)
- ASEAN Economies: Crisis and Response. (1985)
- Crisis and Response in the Malaysian Economy. (1987)
- Child Labor in Malaysia. (1992)
- Islamic Economic Alternatives: Critical Perspectives and New Directions. (1992)
- Industrializing Malaysia: Performance, Problems, Prospects. (1993)
- Privatizing Malaysia: Rents, Rhetoric, Realities. (1995)
- Malaysia's Economic Development: Policy & Reform. (with Ng Suew Kiat) (1996)
- Capital, the State and Late Industrialization in East Asia. (with John Borrego and Alejandro Alvarez Bejar) (1996)
- Tigers in Trouble: Financial Governance, Liberalization and Crises in East Asia. (1998)
- Industrial Policy in East Asia. (with Tan Kock Wah) (1999)
- Technology, Competitiveness and the State: Malaysia's Industrial Technology Policies. (with Greg Felker) (1999)
- Rents, Rent-Seeking and Economic Development: Theory and the Asian Evidence. (with Mushtaq Khan) (2000)
- Malaysian Eclipse: Economic Crisis and Recovery. (2001)
- Reinventing Malaysia: Reflections on Its Past and Future. (2001)
- Globalization Versus Development: Heterodox Perspectives. (with Shyamala Nagaraj) (2001)
- Southeast Asia's Industrialization: Industrial Policy, Capabilities and Sustainability. (2001)
- Ugly Malaysians? South–South Investments Abused. (2002)
- Southeast Asia's Paper Tigers: From Miracle to Debacle and Beyond. (2003)
- Manufacturing Miracles: How Internationally Competitive National Firms and Industries Developed in East Asia. (2003)
- Globalization and Its Discontents, Revisited. (with K. J. Khoo) (2003)
- Ethnic Business Chinese Capitalism in Southeast Asia. (with Brian Folk) (2003)
- After The Storm: Crisis, Recovery and Sustaining Development in East Asia. (2004)
- The New Development Economics. (with Ben Fine) (2005)
- The Origins of Development Economics. (with Erik Reinert) (2005)
- Pioneers of Development Economics. (2005)
- The Long Twentieth Century – Globalization Under Hegemony: The Changing World Economy. (2006)
- The Long Twentieth Century – The Great Divergence: Hegemony, Uneven Development and Global Inequality. (2006)
- Malaysian Industrial Policy. (2007)
- Policy Matters: Economic and Social Policies to Sustain Equitable Development. (with Jose Antonio Ocampo) (2007)
- Flat World, Big Gaps: Economic Liberalization, Globalization, Poverty and Inequality. (2007)
- Growth Divergences: Explaining Differences in Economic Performance. (with Jose Antonio Ocampo and Robert Vos) (2007)
- Towards Full and Decent Employment. (with Jose Antonio Ocampo) (2007)
- Reforming the International Financial System for Development. (2011)
- Poor Poverty. (with Anis Chowdhury) (2011)
- Good Governance For What? (with Anis Chowdhury) (2012)
