= African Health Economics and Policy Association =

Nonprofit organization in Accra, Ghana

The African Health Economics and Policy Association (AfHEA) (French: Association Africaine d'Economie et Politique de la Santé) is a professional association for health economists and policymakers in Africa established in 2009 in Accra. The Association aims to strengthen the use of health economics and health policy analysis in Africa to improve efficiency in health systems. AfHEA is a bilingual organisation operating in English and French.

== About ==
AfHEA is one of three key health professional associations in Africa, the others being the African Federation of Public Health Associations and African Federation of Obstetrics and Gynaecology. It has created a space for professionals to share and discuss issues from their experiences. The Association holds biennial conferences which are an important space for sharing research on African health systems. They are also used by the WHO Regional Africa Office for Africa's health financing programme.

== Conferences ==
AFHEA’s biennial conferences are important spaces for sharing WHO African Region’s research on health systems performance. This space is being used by the WHO Regional Africa Office for Africa’s health financing and economics programme, and has the potential for leveraging to share the work by other programmes on health systems and health services. Scholarships are available to help female researchers and students from low-income countries attend the conferences.

=== Fifth Biennial Conference 2019 ===
The fifth AfHEA conference was held in Accra with the theme 'Securing PHC for all: the foundation for making progress on UHC in Africa.'

=== Fourth Biennial Conference 2016 ===
The fourth AfHEA conference was held in Rabat, Morocco reflecting the existing RESSMA working on similar issues to AfHEA in North Africa. The conference had seven themes:

2. Financing the SDGs and the Grand Convergence

3. Policies and reforms for improving health system performance

4. Priority setting and economic evaluation

5. Human Resources for Health

6. Key methodological changes in health economics and policy analysis specific to Africa

7. The role of research institutions and donors in building capacity in health economics.

=== Third Biennial Conference 2014 ===
The conference was held in Nairobi, Kenya. This was the first time the conference was held outside West Africa, reflecting the growth in membership throughout the continent.

=== Second Biennial Conference 2011 ===
The theme of the second conference was 'Towards universal healthcare coverage in Africa'. It was held in Saly, Senegal. On the day following the conference AfHEA's Scientific Committee met to discuss producing policy briefs on issues covered in the conference.

=== First Conference 2009 ===
The first conference was held in the same year as the Association's founding, in Accra, Ghana. The conference theme was 'Priorities of health economics in Africa.'

== Membership ==
AfHEA has 200 members from the fields of health economics, health financing and health policy from African countries.

The Chair of the Board of Trustees is Dr Eva Pascoal, a health economist for WHO in Mozambique. The Executive Director is Dr Chris Atim, who works for WHO in Ghana. The Scientific Committee is chaired by Professor Obinna Onwujekwe, a professor at the University of Nigeria, Nsukka, and Dr Djesika Amendah, a senior policy analyst of Aidspan.

== Objectives ==
According to AfHEA its objectives are to:

- Provide a forum for information sharing and exchange for those working in health economics and related fields in Africa;
- Promote the development of health economics and policy capacity in Africa with an emphasis on the needs of lower income countries;
- Promote the production and dissemination of high quality research by African health economists and health policy analysts;
- Promote the appropriate use of health economics and policy analysis tools within health sector decision-making in Africa;
- Support health policy development and advice to policymakers in African countries;
- Represent the interests of African health economists and health policy analysts in relevant international forums.
