= MAKNA =

Malaysian not-for-profit social enterprise

MAKNA - National Cancer Council
- Founded: 10 November 1994; 31 years ago
- Founder: Dato' Mohd Farid Ariffin
- Type: Nonprofit organization
- Purpose: Cancer
- Location: Kuala Lumpur, Malaysia
- Region served: Malaysia, Vietnam
- Method: Financial Assistance, Treatment, Research, Awareness, Consultancy, Volunteerism, Home Visit, Cancer Helpline, Young Cancer Survivor Scholarship, Halfway House
- Website: makna.org.my

The National Cancer Council Malaysia (MAKNA, Malay: Majlis Kanser Nasional), is a Malaysian not-for-profit organization dedicated to reducing the pain, suffering and morbidity that cancer patients often experience. The organization provides curative care, preventive care, cancer research, and support services to cancer patients and their families, high-risk groups, and the general public in Malaysia and abroad. In addition, MAKNA operates a bursary program that provides financial support to individuals with cancer and in 2020, they received the Merdeka Award under the Education and Community category.

== History ==
The organisation was registered under Registrar of Societies Malaysia on 10 November 1994 and officially launched on 30 March 1995. It was founded by Dato' Mohd Farid Ariffin.

MAKNA became an associate UICC member in 1997

The Cancer Centre was established in 1999. and includes The Tengku Ampuan Afzan Oncology Ward, Radiotherapy, Research facilities, and Bone Marrow Transplant Unit, which is one of the largest in the country. In 2014, the centre provided treatment to 1,396 patients.

== Services ==
Cancer Research - Provides research grants for cancer research and studies.

Breast Cancer Screening - Provides mobile breast cancer screening facility especially beneficial for rural areas

Cancer Awareness - Conducts cancer education service, breast self examinations, and cancer exhibitions.

Bursary Program - Provides monthly financial aid in the form of allowances, medical equipments, medication, and ancillary items.

Youth Scholarship - Tertiary education scholarship for cancer patients and children of cancer patients

Home Visit - Patient's receiving financial aids are visited by volunteers and staff for treatment and socio-economic status evaluation

Support Group - a social group for cancer patients and cancer survivor

Volunteer Management - Connect volunteers to eradicate cancer through helping cancer patients, educating the public, and raising awareness.

Helpline - a toll free helpline for cancer patients and caretakers

Halfway House - short-term accommodation for patients and their caregivers travelling away from home for treatment. As of 2026, there are a total of 6 MAKNA halfway house located across Malaysia.

- Villa Gauhar, 4, Jln Austin Perdana 5/1, Taman Austin Perdana, 81100 Johor Bahru, Johor Darul Ta'zim
- Villa Mutiara, 22A, Persiaran Seksyen 2/4, Bandar Putra Bertam, 13200 Kepala Batas, Pulau Pinang
- Villa Kilatan, Lot 2179, Jalan Pasir Puteh, Kubang Kerian, 15200 Kota Bharu, Kelantan
- Villa Bayu, 7, Lorong Ujana 10, 88400 Kota Kinabalu, Sabah
- Villa Kenyalang, No 7, Lot 5252, Jalan Kapor, 9c2, 93150 Kuching, Sarawak
- Villa Farul, 92, Jalan P15 H4/5, Presint 15, 62050 Putrajaya, Wilayah Persekutuan Putrajaya
- Villa Arah, 10, Taman Kamariah, Taman Gombak Jaya, 53100 Kuala Lumpur, Selangor
- Villa Terengan, 60017, Jln Mengabang Tengah 8A, 21100 Kuala Terengganu, Terengganu
