= Merdeka Award =

Malaysian award

- Country: Malaysia
- First award: 2008; 18 years ago
- Final award: 2024

The Merdeka Award is a Malaysian award that recognises and celebrates the achievements and significant contributions of individuals to Malaysia and its people, within their respective fields.

The Royal Patron of the Merdeka Award Trust is the Sultan of Perak Darul Ridzuan, Sultan Nazrin Muizzuddin Shah.

== History ==
The Merdeka Award was launched on 27 August 2007 in conjunction with the 50th anniversary of the independence of Malaysia. It was jointly founded by PETRONAS, ExxonMobil (exited 2021) and Shell companies.

== Award Process ==
The Merdeka Award used to be granted every year, until 2018, when it was then conferred every other year. The accolade recognizes the notable contributions of individuals and organizations, regardless of nationality, who have demonstrated achievements that has contributed significantly to Malaysia in their respective fields. Below is the award stage/categories in order:

=== Stage One: List of Categories ===
As of 2024, there are seven award categories:

- Contribution to Education and Community
- Contribution to Humanities, Arts and Sports
- Contribution to Environment and Planetary Health
- Contribution to Science, Technology and Innovation (previously known as Health, Science and Technology)
- Scholastic and Academic Achievement
- Anugerah Khas Merdeka (previously known as Contribution to the People of Malaysia)
- Anugerah Harapan Merdeka

=== Stage Two: Award Eligibility ===
The award is open to all living Malaysian citizens – individuals or organizations Only non-citizens are eligible for the Anugerah Khas Merdeka category, whilst the Scholastic and Academic Achievement category is open only to individuals.

=== Stage Three: Nomination and Selection ===
The nomination and selection process is an independent, objective and fair system administered by a board of trustees, selection committee, and nomination committees.

=== Stage Four: Nomination Committee ===
Their role is to identify, deliberate, shortlist and recommend candidates to the selection committee. There are five committees, one for each category. Each committee comprises three members, except for Education and Community, which has five members.

=== Stage Five: Selection Committee ===
Their role is to deliberate the merits of the candidates put forward by the nomination committees and recommend shortlisted candidates to the board. There are five members of the selection committee.

=== Final Stage: Board of Trustees ===
Their role is to make a final selection of the recipients. The decision must be unanimous with one award for each category, though there may not be recipients in every category each year. The award can be shared by as many as two recipients. The board comprises representatives of the founding members, as well as two independent members.

== Award Ceremonies ==
The award winners are announced every two years in August or September in conjunction with Malaysia's Independence Day or Malaysia Day, with the Merdeka Award Ceremony taking place later in the year.

=== Award recipients ===
Year	Category	Laureate	Notes
2008	Education and Community	Royal Professor Ungku Abdul Aziz bin Ungku Abdul Hamid	For contribution to the eradication of poverty, rural economics and the development of Tabung Haji and in the field of Education.
2008	Environment and Planetary Health	Malaysian Nature Society (MNS)	For contribution to the Belum-Temenggor Forest Complex Conservation Initiative.
2008	Science, Technology and Innovation	Nipah Virus Encephalitis Investigation Team from the Faculty of Medicine, University of Malaya (Joint Recipient)	For contribution to the discovery and understanding of the causes, effects and control of the Nipah Encephalitis viral infection.
2008	Science, Technology and Innovation	Professor Emeritus Dato' Dr Khalid Kadir (Joint Recipient)	For contribution to the study and understanding of diabetes and the relationship between hormones and stresses in various tissues.
2008	Anugerah Khas Merdeka	Datuk Leslie Davidson	For contribution in the introduction of the pollinating insects Elaedobius kamerunicus from Africa to the oil palm and plantations in Malaysia, leading to the rapid development of the palm oil industry.
2009	Education and Community	Tun Dr Fatimah Hashim (Joint Recipient)	For contribution to the empowerment of women in Malaysia and for protecting and securing rights and economic opportunities for women through advocacy.
2009	Education and Community	Dato’ Lim Phaik Gan (Joint Recipient)	For contribution to the empowerment of women in Malaysia and for protecting and securing rights and economic opportunities for women through advocacy.
2009	Science, Technology and Innovation	Professor Datuk Dr Halimaton Hamdan	For contribution to the development and application of Maerogel as a commercially viable multi-purpose material.
2009	Scholastic and Academic Achievement	Dato’ Seri Ir Dr Zaini Ujang	For study and scholarly contributions in the various environmental initiatives concerning water supply, sewage, river rehabilitation and industrial ecology.
2010	Education and Community	Datin Paduka Mother A Mangalam A/P S Iyaswamy Iyer	For contribution in promoting the welfare of the underprivileged and for fostering national unity.
2010	Scholastic and Academic Achievement	Academician Emeritus Professor Dr Yong Hoi Sen (Joint Recipient)	For contribution to the development of basic and applied knowledge of Genetics, Molecular Biology, Biological Systematics, Evolutionary Biology and Biological Diversity of Malaysia's flora and fauna.
2010	Scholastic and Academic Achievement	Distinguished Professor Dr Harith Ahmad (Joint Recipient)	For contribution in research and promoting the development of photonics in Malaysia.
2010	Anugerah Khas Merdeka	Tan Sri Just Faaland	For contribution to the advocacy of equitable growth through eradication of poverty and reduction of socio-economic polarisation.
2011	Environment and Planetary Health	Dato’ Dr Kenneth Yeang	For contribution to the development of design methods for the ecological design and planning of the built environment.
2011	Scholastic and Academic Achievement	Professor Dato’ Dr Goh Khean Lee (Joint Recipient)	For contribution in elevating the study and practice of gastroenterology and hepatology in Malaysia to global standards.
2011	Scholastic and Academic Achievement	Professor Dr Mak Joon Wah (Joint Recipient)	For fundamental and applied research in parasitology and parasitic diseases, public health and pathology.
2012	Science, Technology and Innovation	Academician Tan Sri Emeritus Professor Datuk Dr. Augustine Ong Soon Hock	For contribution to the research and development of the chemistry and technology of palm oil, and for his significant role in advocating and promoting the Malaysian palm oil industry to the world.
2012	Scholastic and Academic Achievement	Tan Sri Professor Dr Syed Muhammad Naquib al-Attas	For contribution to the scholarly research in the area of Islamisation of contemporary knowledge and Muslim education.
2012	Anugerah Khas Merdeka	Dr. Engkik Soepadmo	For contribution to the research and conservation of Malaysia's forest plant diversity.
2013	Education and Community	Tan Sri Dato’ Seri Utama Arshad Ayub (Joint Recipient)	For contribution in shaping Malaysia's education landscape through the development of professional education, education reforms and innovation that have resulted in education becoming more accessible to Malaysians.
2013	Education and Community	Raja Tan Sri Dato’ Seri Utama Muhammad Alias Raja Muhammad Ali (Joint Recipient)	For contribution to rural development and rural reform through organizing successful land settlement projects (FELDA) for the many landless, rural population in Malaysia.
2013	Environment and Planetary Health	Dr. Lim Boo Liat	For contribution to the conservation of Malaysia's biological diversity through the study, understanding and control of vector-borne diseases and the relationship between diseases and the environment; and for advocating the protection of Malaysia's natural heritage.
2013	Science, Technology and Innovation	Tan Sri Dato’ Dr Yahya Awang	For contribution to pioneering the development of clinical research and cardiac surgery in Malaysia, and for his instrumental role in the establishment of the National Heart Institute (IJN).
2013	Scholastic and Academic Achievement	Emeritus Professor Dato’ Dr Lam Sai Kit	For contribution to scholarly research and development in medical virology and emerging infectious diseases including dengue.
2014	Education and Community	Datuk Mohd Nor Khalid (Lat)	For contribution to the promotion and pluralism of Malaysia's cultural identity through the use of cartoons and for the promotion of understanding and respect among Malaysia's diverse ethnic communities.
2014	Environment and Planetary Health	Mohd Khan Momin Khan	For contribution to wildlife research and conservation through the setting up of captive breeding centers, as well as for pioneering and successfully managing human-wildlife conflict in affected areas.
2014	Science, Technology and Innovation	Datuk Dr Choo Yuen May	For contribution to the development of novel, efficient and green processes for the palm-based industry through research and commercialization of various technologies.
2014	Scholastic and Academic Achievement	Professor Dr Abdul Latif Ahmad (Joint Recipient)	For contribution to the scholarly research and development of technologies in the areas of polymer science, wastewater treatment and membrane separation technology.
2014	Scholastic and Academic Achievement	Professor Dr Ahmad Fauzi Ismail (Joint Recipient)	For contribution to scholarly research and development of technologies for commercialisation in membrane performance for both gas separation, and water and wastewater treatment.
2014	Anugerah Khas Merdeka	Dato Sri Gathorne, 5th Earl of Cranbrook	For contribution to pioneering research and conservation of Malaysia's forest biodiversity and the ecology and biology of Malaysian mammals and birds, and for advocating environmental conservation.
2015	Education and Community	Tan Sri Dr Jemilah Mahmood	For contribution to the development of humanitarian and international emergency relief.
2015	Environment and Planetary Health	Emeritus Professor Dato’ Dr Abdul Latiff Mohamad (Joint Recipient)	For contribution to the research and understanding of plant taxonomy and conservation biology in Malaysia.
2015	Environment and Planetary Health	Professor Emeritus Tan Sri Dr Zakri Abdul Hamid (Joint Recipient)	For contribution to the observation, analysis and assessment of biodiversity and ecosystem services, fostering the remediation and protection of the natural environment and promoting environmental sustainability in Malaysia and globally.
2015	Science, Technology and Innovation	Professor Datin Paduka Dr Khatijah Mohamad Yusoff	For contribution in the field of microbiology and virology through a better understanding and diagnosis of contagious and fatal viruses in poultry and the study of the potential of the virus in combating cancer cells.
2015	Scholastic and Academic Achievement	Professor Dr Ir Mohd Ali Hashim	For scholastic contribution in the research of separation processes and water and wastewater treatment and for his instrumental role in the setting-up of the Centre for Ionic Liquids.
2015	Anugerah Khas Merdeka	Dr Elizabeth Lesley Bennett	For contribution to the conservation and management of wetland habitats and that of endangered wildlife in Malaysia through research, advocacy and policies.
2016	Education and Community	Tan Sri Lakshmanan Krishnan	For contribution to laying the foundation for the modern film industry in the country and for his instrumental role in developing early acting talents including Malaysian film icon the late P Ramlee.
2016	Environment and Planetary Health	Tan Sri Dato’ Seri Dr Salleh Mohd Nor	For contribution to the conservation of the natural environment and forestry in Malaysia through his leadership role at the Forest Research Institute Malaysia (FRIM) and the Malaysian Nature Society (MNS).
2016	Science, Technology and Innovation	Distinguished Professor Datuk Dr Looi Lai Meng	For contribution in pioneering research in amyloidosis, renal pathology and cancer pathology and for her significant contributions and role in promoting the field of pathology in Malaysia and the region.
2016	Scholastic and Academic Achievement	Professor Dato’ Ir Dr Wan Ramli Wan Daud	For scholarly research and development in advancing the technology of fuel cells and hydrogen energy in Malaysia and the region.
2017	Education and Community	Dato' Dr. Abdul Halim Ismail	For contribution and his pivotal role in establishing the first Islamic Bank in Malaysia, which led to the development and growth of the Nation and region’s Islamic banking, insurance and finance sectors.
2017	Environment and Planetary Health	Dato' Seri Tengku Dr. Zainal Adlin Bin Tengku Mahamood	For contribution to wildlife and forest conservation in Malaysia and the region through fieldwork, education, advocacy, policy and international cooperation.
2017	Science, Technology and Innovation	Professor Dr. Balbir Singh Mohan Singh (joint recipient)	For contribution to the discovery and pioneering work on a new cause of human malaria, Plasmodium knowlesi. The discovery of this potentially fatal zoonotic disease has changed the understanding of malaria and the way infections are treated in the country and globally.
2017	Science, Technology and Innovation	Dr. Timothy William (joint recipient)	For contribution to the effective treatment of a new cause of human malaria, Plasmodium knowlesi. The discovery has changed the way this infection is managed in the country and globally.
2017	Scholastic and Academic Achievement	Professor Dr. Masjuki Haji Hassan	For scholarly research in engineering and energy science and for his instrumental role in the research and development of biofuel and other sources of efficient energy and automotive engines.
2017	Anugerah Khas Merdeka	Professor Dr. Anthony Milner	For contribution to research and education in Malaysian history that has shaped and promoted the understanding of the Nation’s identity, heritage and culture, and for his role in fostering international collaborations.
2018	Education and Community	Hassan Abdul Muthalib	For contribution as the pioneer and earliest influence in the local animation world through his folktale-inspired works and his leadership role in developing an educational framework on the artistic importance of animation in the country.
2018	Environment and Planetary Health	Engr Gurmit Singh KS	For contribution through his activism, advocacy works and leadership role in the promotion of sustainable environment and combating climate change in Malaysia.
2018	Science, Technology and Innovation	Professor Dr. Mohd Hair Bejo (joint recipient)	For contribution and instrumental role in advancing efforts towards sustainable food production through the development and commercialisation of chicken disease vaccines in treating Gumboro disease that benefits the poultry industry in Malaysia and internationally.
2018	Science, Technology and Innovation	Dato' Dr. Gan Ee Kiang (joint recipient)	For contribution in his pioneering work in developing a successful exemplary commercial model for R&D for Malaysia’s universities, and through his extensive work and leadership role in the fields of clinical pharmacology, pharmaceutical sciences and drug-related research in the country.
2018	Scholastic and Academic Achievement	Distinguished Professor Dr. Rajah Rasiah (joint recipient)	For contribution in his scholarly research and development of the theoretical macroeconomic framework in the promotion of sustainable development, by pioneering the conceptualisation, measurement and application of innovation theory and the framing of innovation policy for developing countries.
2018	Scholastic and Academic Achievement	The Late Emeritus Professor Tan Sri Datuk Dr. Khoo Kay Kim (joint recipient)	For contribution to the scholarly research, development of reinterpretation of Malaysian history and lifetime dedication in the history education in the country that has shaped the post-independence study of history in modern Malaysia.
2018	Anugerah Khas Merdeka	Andrew James Eavis	For contribution in his pioneering works in the areas of geomorphology and cave survey through the Mulu Cave Projects with the Royal Geographical Society Expedition, and the discovery of the Sarawak Chamber, leading to extended research on rainforest habitats and ecosystem and establishing international collaborations for scientific and nature expeditions.
2020	Education and Community	Majlis Kanser Nasional	MAKNA has provided financial, emotional and social support to nearly 60,000 cancer patients for over 26 years, without discriminating on creed, colour or ethnicity.
2020	Environment and Planetary Health	South East Asia Rainforest Research Partnership	SEARRP has contributed to the conservation, sustainable management and restoration of Malaysia’s forest ecosystem and also played an instrumental role in the education and training of Malaysian environmental scientists.
2020	Scholastic and Academic Achievement	Emeritus Professor Dr. Ng Kwan Hoong	A medical physics pioneer whose research in radiation medicine has contributed significantly to the fight against breast cancer globally by researching various imaging methods including breast density measurement to help early detection.
2020	Anugerah Khas Merdeka	Suzanne Mooney	An advocate for sustainable food systems, founder of Malaysia’s first sustainable food bank that is feeding Malaysians and reducing food waste in the country.
2022	Education and Community	Teach For Malaysia	For contribution in influencing 330,285 students over the past decade through collaborations with 893 schools and 131 student-led initiatives with 34,676 beneficiaries.
2022	Environment and Planetary Health	Global Environment Centre (GEC)	GEC has contributed to the biodiversity, river and forest conservation and restoration of Malaysia. They have played a fundamental role in the restoration of Mangrove trees in Malaysia, as well as helping over 277 community organisations and 700 schools increase their capacity to protect and restore water resources.
2022	Science, Technology and Innovation	Professor Dato’ Dr. Adeeba Kamarulzaman	For contribution towards the study, treatment and prevention of infectious diseases and HIV/AIDS for over 30 years. Her work has led to a dramatic drop in the rate of new HIV/ AIDS infections by 50 per cent over the previous 10 years.
2022	Scholastic and Academic Achievement	Emeritus Professor Dato’ Dr. Siti Zuraina binti Abdul Majid, FASc	Pioneer in Malaysia’s field of Archaeology, renowned for discovering the Palaeolithic site of Kota Tampan and the Palaeolithic skeleton of the Perak Man, in Lenggong, which may be regarded as Malaysia’s first “capital”. Her research also established that early man’s migratory route from Africa to Australia was through Peninsular Malaysia, thus putting Malaysia on the archaeological map of the world.
2022	Anugerah Khas Merdeka	Dato’ Dr. Annabel Teh Gallop	For her tireless dedication and commitment towards the international promotion of historic manuscripts written in the Malay language for the past three decades.
2022	Anugerah Harapan Merdeka	Samuel Isaiah	For his contribution as well as commitment in improving and uplifting the standard of education among the Orang Asli children, and in coaching teachers to elevate the overall quality of education for all.
2024	Education and Community	Dato' Seri Dr. Abdul Samad Mohamed Said (joint recipient)	For multifaceted contributions to Malay literature encompassing novels, poetry, essays, dramas and performing arts.
2024	Education and Community	Dato' Dr. Faridah Merican (joint recipient)	For pioneering the nation’s performing arts scene via theatre drama and media to drive social and cultural awareness and advocacy.
2024	Environment and Planetary Health	Professor Dr. Joy Jacqueline Pereira	For effectively navigating the science-policy interface with extensive research on climate change and fostering international collaborations to safeguard environments and communities.
2024	Science, Technology and Innovation	Tan Sri Dato' Dr. Abu Bakar Suleiman	For unwavering dedication in shaping healthcare policies and initiatives to ensure equitable and quality healthcare, especially in improving patient access to vital nephrology services nationwide.
2024	Scholastic and Academic Achievement	Emeritus Professor Dr. Jomo Kwame Sundaram	For contributions as an outstanding academician, eminent economist, and trusted advisor to global and local policymakers addressing pressing economic developmental issues worldwide.
2024	Anugerah Khas Merdeka	Dr. Kathryn Anne Rivai	For unwavering dedication to improving education access for underprivileged children through Etania Schools, offering customised quality education and vocational training in Sabah.
2024	Anugerah Harapan Merdeka	Ian Yee Ngan Fui	For spearheading investigative journalism in Malaysia amongst youth, delivering impactful multimedia documentaries and innovative public action campaigns against social injustices.

=== Prizes ===
Each award category carries a cash prize of RM300,000 and comes with a trophy and an inscribed certificate, except for winners of the Anugerah Harapan category, who do not receive a trophy.

==== Logo & trophy design ====
The Merdeka Award Logo and Trophy was designed by Dato’ Johan Ariff, the Creative Director of Johan Design Associates, who also designed the PETRONAS logo in 1974.

The trophy, a three-dimensional version of the logo was specially designed using Lapis Lazuli gemstone as its base, and combined with elements of gold, silver, Malaysian pewter and Malaysian hardwood, Chengal.

== Merdeka Award Grant for International Attachment (MAGIA) ==
An extension of the Merdeka Award, the Merdeka Award Grant for International Attachment (MAGIA) was launched in April 2012 as a signature outreach programme by the Merdeka Award Trust. The MAGIA enables recipients to participate in collaborative projects and/or programmes for up to three months, at selected internationally acclaimed institutions, corporations, agencies and organisations within the network of the Merdeka Award's three founding partners – PETRONAS, ExxonMobil and Shell.

=== Grant Eligibility ===
The MA Grant is open to all qualified Malaysians between 22 and 35 years of age, who are able to demonstrate the Spirit of Merdeka within their areas of expertise.

As of 2024, the grant is awarded every cycle to one candidate within each of the following disciplines

- Education and Community / Social Work
- Environment
- Health, Science and Technology
- Sports
- Arts (visual and performing)

The broad categories involved for the consideration of the MA Grant are:

- Heritage and social work
- Traditional disciplines including economics, finance and scientific specialties
- Environmental studies including climate change, biodiversity, and environmental protection and conservation

=== Nomination & Selection ===
Three steps are involved in the selection process:

==== Step One: Submission ====
Reviewed by the Merdeka Award Secretariat, all applications must be submitted together with an Attachment Proposal and Attachment Budget, outlining the proposed area of research, projected expenses, expected outcomes and benefits to Malaysia and her people.

==== Step Two: Shortlist ====
Interviews are then conducted by the Selection Committee, with representatives from Shell and PETRONAS. Candidates are comprehensively evaluated based on various criteria including the quality of their proposal, relevance of proposed area of research, innovativeness in area and method of research, philosophy and commitment to community building, and public speaking, social and media skills.

==== Step Three: Final Selection ====
Recommendations of outstanding candidates are made to the Merdeka Award Board of Trustees, who make the final selection.

=== Grant Recipients ===
Year	Category	Grant Recipient	Notes
2013	Health, Science & Technology	Dr Natrah Fatin Mohd Ikhsan	For research towards better microbial resource management for sustainable agriculture production.
2013	Health, Science & Technology	Assistant Professor Dr Abhimanyu Veerakumarasivam	For research towards excellence and sustainability in cancer genetics.
2014	Health, Science & Technology	Dr Kamalan Jeevaratnam	For research into cardiac cellular therapy via stem cells, in-vitro differentiation mechanism for cardiac stem cells for large scale production, and cellular cardiomyopathy therapy application.
2014	Health, Science & Technology	Dr Lim Hong Ngee	For research and development of a smart nanotechnology-based breast cancer testing scheme.
2015	Health, Science & Technology	Ms Chua Ling Ling	For research towards understanding how the gut microbiome (bacterial in the gut) interacts with the immune system and leads to the development of age-related illnesses and premature aging.
2015	Health, Science & Technology	Dr Mohd Sukor Su'ait	For research into fabrication of solid-state dye-sensitized solar cell (DSSC) utilising Malaysian commodities such as rubber, palm and seaweeds as solid polymer electrolyte.
2016	Education and Community	Ms Koh Lily	For research on developing expertise and academic exchanges on innovative SME business models in encouraging Malaysian SMEs to effectively place themselves in the value chain. This is in light of Industry 4.0, an EU Commission initiative under the Horizon 2020 plan, which is part of the EU Framework Programme for Research and Innovation.
2016	Environment	Dr Khamarrul Azahari Razak	For research that focuses on the various approaches of strengthening natural disaster research and promoting integrated university-government-industry partnership for managing and reducing disaster risks in changing environments.
2017	Education and Community	Shahar Koyok	For research on representation of indigenous peoples' art within national institutions.
2017	Health, Science & Technology	Professor Madya Dr. Zetty Norhana Balia Yusof	For research on the potential of Malaysian seaweeds as the source of antifungal compounds for application in the oil palm industry.
2017	Health, Science & Technology	Dr. Sophia Rasheeqa Ismail	For research on lipidomics profiling, and risk of early-onset myocardial infarction.
2018	Health, Science & Technology	Professor Dr. Ong Wee Jun	For research focussing on mimicking nature in solar energy conversion and energy storage, to address the importance of energy security and severity of environmental issues.
2018	Health, Science & Technology	Dr. Lee Tian Khoon	For research on converting rubber material for advanced energy storage and conversion.
2018	Health, Science & Technology	Aishah Ismail	For research on stroke prediction biomarkers through ocular blood flow, via laser speckle flowgraphy.
2019	Environment	Chrishen R. Gomez	For research focussing on genetic studies on the Sunda Clouded Leopard (Neofelis Diardi) and sympartic carnivores.
2019	Health, Science & Technology	Feng Ying Xing	For research on prognosticating work productivity, stress levels and workload capacity through fNIRS brain haemodynamic signal measurement.
2019	Health, Science & Technology	Dr. Mohd Azri Ab Rani	For research on Sodium-ion batteries for future commercialisation.
2019	Health, Science & Technology	Dr. Yanny Marliana Baba Ismail	For research that focuses on smart material that increases the efficiency of bone healing.
2021	Environment	Dr. Aini Hasanah Abd Mutalib	For research on Passive Acoustic Monitoring (PAM) to determine the occurrence, distribution and behaviour of small apes at Kenyir Rainforest, Terengganu.
2021	Environment	Dr. Wan Nor Fitri Wan Jaafar	For research on cloning and stem cell research in wildlife reproduction.
2021	Health, Science & Technology	Prof Madya Dr. Nur Adlyka Ainul Annuar	For research on weak or buried monster black holes in active galaxies.
2021	Health, Science & Technology	Jessica Ooi Sui Ying	For research on paper-based devices for colorimetric detection of the ovarian cancer biomarker mIRNA-665.
2021	Health, Science & Technology	Ir Dr. Freddy Tan Kheng Suan	For research on the design of next-generation on-board EV chargers, using wide band-gap technology.
2023	Education and Community	Dr. Masni A/P Mat Dong	For research focussing on spatial justice and the development of a multidimensional poverty perspective on the Orang Asli in Malaysia.
2023	Education and Community	Syaza Soraya Sauli	For research on environmental sustainability values in preschool children in Malaysia, through comprehensive nature-based learning modules.
2023	Environment	Dr. Kong Xin Ying	For research on the photocatalytic upcycling of plastics as a sustainable energy alternative.
2023	Environment	Amaziasizamoria Jumail	For research on tropical forest restoration ecology within a Global South context.
2023	Environment	Dr. Ng Chuck Chuan	For research on phytoremediation -- a Nature-based Solution (NbS) for soil heavy metal pollution.
2025	Health, Science & Technology	Calvin Shee Yin Ming	For research on Microbiome of Pitcher Plants to Serve as Natural Compounds for New Antibiotics.
2025	Health, Science & Technology	Dinesh Sangarran Ramachandram	For research on dementia care in Malaysia using education and practical medication tools.
2025	Health, Science & Technology	Keisheni Ganeson	For research on Biodegradable Microneedle Patch made with Butterfly Pea to treat wounds.
2025	Health, Science & Technology	Nur Hafizah Annezah Bt Utuh	For research on DNA-guided medication for personalised treatement for heart disease patients.
2025	Health, Science & Technology	Dr. Rasyidah Bt Rehir	For research on transforming medical training through advanced cadaver preservation and body donation

== Merdeka Award Talk Series ==
The Merdeka Award Talk Series (2019–present) provides a platform for individuals to connect based on shared core values, with the goal of inspiring leadership that can positively impact communities, contribute to national development, drive economic growth, and support environmental sustainability.

The panel sessions within the Merdeka Award Talk Series aim to highlight thought leaders who exemplify resilience, adaptability, and creativity in overcoming challenges. Through real-world examples, the sessions explore how leaders have transformed setbacks into opportunities, demonstrating how individuals can make the most of every situation. The series encourages participants of all backgrounds—regardless of age, gender, or race—to adopt similar approaches in their own leadership journeys. It addresses a range of critical issues facing Malaysian society today, offering diverse perspectives and fostering awareness to inspire both individual and collective change.

== Merdeka Award Roundtables (No longer active) ==
The Merdeka Award Roundtables (August 2011–2018), was a series of TV talk shows carried on ASTRO Awani Channel 501. It featured leading figures from Malaysia's corporate, academic and social spheres. The Roundtables were designed to inspire, debate and discuss key issues of interest to Malaysians.

== Merdeka Award Thumbs-Up Challenge (No longer active) ==
The Merdeka Award Thumbs-Up Challenge was an initiative organised by The Merdeka Award Trust, to create a platform for all Malaysians to share impactful and sustainable ideas based on select themes. The initiative encouraged participants to contribute an idea that had been tested and was impactful.

It was launched in 2015 and the Thumbs-Up Challenge recognised ideas from each theme's Challenge. The best overall idea could be implemented on a larger scale through the Merdeka Award's wide network.
