= Imraan Valodia =

South African economist

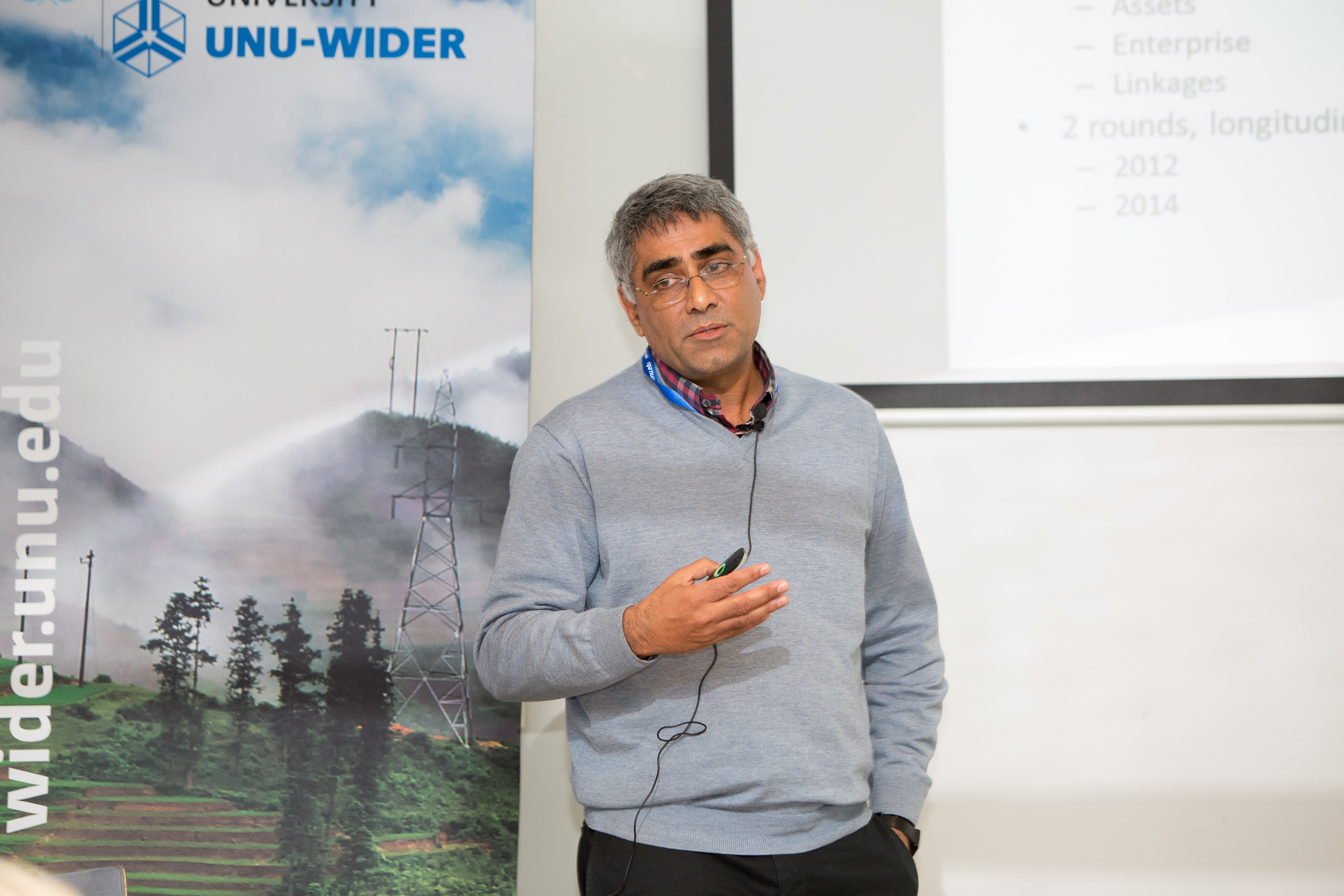
- Imraan Valodia speaking at UNU-WIDER
- Occupations: Professor of Economics, University of Witwatersrand

Academic background
- Education: BCom (Unisa), BCom Hons (Natal), MSc (Lancaster), DEcon (UKZN)

Academic work
- Discipline: Economics
- Sub-discipline: Inequality Studies
- Notable works: Competition Law and Economic Regulation in Southern Africa; Report of the G20 Extraordinary Committee of Independent Experts on Global Inequality
- Website: https://www.wits.ac.za/scis/

Imraan Valodia (born 1965) is Professor of Economics at the University of the Witwatersrand, Johannesburg (Wits) and also the first Pro Vice-Chancellor for Climate, Sustainability and Inequality. He is also the Director of the Southern Centre for Inequality Studies. He served previously as Dean of the Faculty of Commerce, Law, and Management at Wits. Valodia is a member of the Global Council on Inequality, AIDS, and Pandemics and co-authored its report on the inequality-pandemic cycle. He was also appointed by President Cyrill Ramaphosa to the G20 Extraordinary Global Committee on Wealth Inequality. He is also a member of the South African Presidential Advisory Council of "thought leaders" who advise President Ramaphosa.

== Career ==
=== Academic Expertise ===
He is a global expert in inequality, climate justice, competition policy and industrial development and on employment in developing countries, the informal economy, and gender impacts of direct and indirect taxation. Alliance magazine included Prof. Valodia as one of the "leading global academics" on political economy. As one of the few African economists focused on inequality, he is frequently interviewed by media on inequality in South Africa and the African continent more broadly.

Valodia was named a Non-Resident Senior Research Fellow at UNU-WIDER (United Nations University World Institute for Development Economics Research), a highly respected global research institute in development economics.

Among his publications is co-editor of The Oxford University Press Handbook of the South African Economy, a detailed and wide-ranging coverage of the key economic questions in South Africa. He also writes regularly in the popular press on issues of inequality.

Prior to his time at Wits, was previously based at the School of Built Environment and Development Studies, University of KwaZulu-Natal where he was a senior researcher and served as acting head of the school.

=== Southern Centre for Inequality Studies ===
Valodia played a leading role in establishing and leading Wits University's Southern Centre for Inequality Studies (SCIS) which is a globally important research centers on new economic thinking and inequality in the global South. The Ford Foundation in 2022 awarded Valodia and the Centre a grant alongside three other research centers in the global South, to match grants awarded to Harvard, MIT, and Columbia. It is the only Center in subsaharan Africa that is part of the Emerging Political Economies (EPE) Network. The center is a multi-disciplinary, cross-country initiative to promote research and policy change to advance greater equality. It was created in October 2017 to undertake research especially in the global South, since so much of the theorising on wealth inequality was being done in the ‘Global North’, where the Northern experience has been universalised and applied to the South.

=== G20 Extraordinary Committee of Independent Experts on Global Inequality ===
In 2025, Valodia's work was recognized in his appointment as one of six global experts on inequality advising the G20 group of the worlds biggest economies chaired by Nobel Laureate Joseph Stiglitz. Valodia was one of the chief authors of the Extraordinary Committee's report, issued in November 2025, that identified an “inequality emergency” akin to the emergency on climate. The Presidents of Brazil and South Africa and Prime Minister of Spain joined together to echo the findings of the report and called on their counterparts in the other powerful countries of the world to take up its recommendations.

=== Influence on Minimum Wage and Competition Law in South Africa ===
Valodia's work in his academic capacity has impacted policy in South Africa. In 2011 he was active on employment and wage issues when appointed by Labor Minister Mildred Oliphant as her adviser in the Employment Conditions Commission to help her set minimum employment standards. In August 2016, he was appointed by then-Deputy President Cyril Ramaphosa to chair a seven-person advisory panel on the national minimum wage. In their final report, he and the panel recommended that South Africa introduce a national minimum wage at a level that balanced poverty reduction with potential employment effects, setting an initial rate of R20 per hour and creating institutional arrangements for regular review, enforcement, exemptions, and broad coverage. The government adopted his recommendations, including legislating a national minimum wage at R20/hr in 2018 through the National Minimum Wage Act (Act No. 9 of 2018), which took effect on 1 January 2019. The Act established the National Minimum Wage Commission, a statutory body with a mandate to review and recommend adjustments annually as the Valodia-chaired panel envisioned. He now serves as chair of that National Minimum Wage Commission, which he was appointed to by Employment and Labour Minister Thulas Nxesi in 2024. In that role, he has been active in soliciting feedback from employers and workers to update the minimum wage in South Africa. He has also pushed back on business claims that unemployment in South Africa is due to too much regulation and high wages.

He was appointed as a member of the national Competition Tribunal, a specialist expert, independent body that hears and decides cases on competition law in South Africa. He is the author of, among other works, the influential book Competition Law and Economic Regulation in Southern Africa and has lectured around the world on the issue.

=== Global Recognition ===
Valodia serves on a number of national committees in South Africa including the Presidential Economic Advisory Council. He was also elected to the Academy of Science of South Africa (Assaf) and is part of its Standing Committee on Science for the Reduction of Poverty and Inequality.

He sits on multiple boards including for the United Nations Research Institute for Social Development (UNRISD), WIEGO (“Women in Informal Employment: Globalizing and Organizing”), Global Development Institute (GDI) at the University of Manchester.
