= Siti Zuraina Abdul Majid =

Malaysian archaeologist (born 1944)

Emeritus Professor Dato' Dr. Siti Zuraina Abdul Majid
- Born: October 3, 1944 (age 81); Kuala Lumpur, Malaysia
- Education: B.A. University of Malaya; M.A. Cambridge University; Ph.D Yale University
- Awards: Merdeka Award 2020; Women at 50 Yale 150 Award 2020

Siti Zuraina Abdul Majid (born October 3, 1944) is a historian and considered to be the first archaeologist in Malaysia, who has won the Merdeka Award for Outstanding Scholastic Achievement in 2020. Siti Zuraina has investigated and excavated many sites in Peninsular Malaysia, Sabah, and Sarawak. She has also worked in many important excavations from the Lower Paleolithic period in Malaysia, Thailand, and the Philippines. Siti Zuraina has been credited with laying the foundation to develop the field of archaeology in Malaysia since the 1970s. For her contributions to archaeology, she has received an honorary Doctor of Humanities degree.

== Education ==
Siti Zuraina was born in Kuala Lumpur, Malaysia. She was in the graduating batch of 1960/61 at Convent Bukit Nanas. Afterward, Siti Zuraina got her Bachelor of Arts in Chinese Studies from the University of Malaya, and her Master of Arts in Oriental Studies from Cambridge University. In 1979, she earned her PhD in Archaeology from Yale University.

== Career ==
To begin her career as an archaeologist, Siti Zuraina started working as the Director of the Centre for Archaeological Research at the University of Malaya. In 2003, she was assigned as the first Heritage Commissioner for Malaysia, leading the Heritage Department of The Ministry of Culture Arts and Tourism.

Siti Zuraina has established the Department of National Heritage to protect Malaysia's historical heritage and archaeological artifacts. She also contributed to the development of the National Heritage Act 2005, requiring all land to be developed away from any historical artifacts to protect the artifacts from disappearing.

From 2011 to 2015, Siti Zuraina was selected as Malaysia's Head of Delegation at the United Nations Education, Scientific and Cultural Organization (UNESCO) World Heritage Committee. Through her efforts, Lenggong Valley obtained a UNESCO World Heritage Site status on June 30, 2012. She has also obtained UNESCO inscriptions for the historical Melaka and George Town, Penang. As well as, playing an important role in getting the UNESCO Memory of the World inscription for Batu Bersurat Terengganu, enriching Malaysian heritage.

In 2017, Siti Zuraina was inducted into the Academy of Science Malaysia. She has also served as a Heritage Advisor to the HRH Sultan of Selangor and Commissioner for Malaysia's Heritage Resources.

Siti Zuraina has written and published many articles and four books. A notable book she wrote is The Perak Man and other Prehistoric Skeletons of Malaysia, which provides an overview of the discoveries found from archaeological site excavations in Malaysia.

== Excavations ==
Siti Zuraina initially went to Lenggong Valley in Perak to find a missing historical link to prehistoric migration. During the visit, Siti Zuraina had a hunch that the formed stones found were man-made and wanted to further investigate, so she raised money with her husband to revisit the area later and do an excavation. There, she discovered the 74,000-year-old Paleolithic stone tool artifact site of Kota Tampan and the 11,000-year-old Paleolithic skeleton of the Perak Man. Kota Tampan showed how early tools were made in a tropical climate, which differs from how early tools were made in Europe. The Perak Man is one of the oldest human skeletons found in Malaysia and is used as one of the earliest evidence of a rare birth defect called Brachymesophalangia Type A2. Additionally, the discovery of the Perak Man led to the revelation of a Paleolithic burial ceremony in Southeast Asia. Siti Zuraina's research found that Peninsular Malaysia was used as early migratory routes from Africa to Australia, providing evidence of one of the earliest habitations in Southeast Asia. Through these discoveries at Lenggong Valley, Malaysia was placed on the archaeological map, when before, compared to the rest of Southeast Asia, Malaysia wasn't a part of archaeological interest. The discoveries that Siti Zuraina made has been written down and taught in the textbooks in Malaysian schools.

Siti Zuraina also discovered the prehistoric sites Niah caves, Sarawak. In her excavations, she found the remains of a 2,000-year-old man with a rare congenital deformity called Amelia.

Through her discoveries and findings, Siti Zuraina got Universiti Sains Malaysia to establish the Center for Archaeological Research to advance archaeology further in Malaysia. Through the Masters and PhD programs, Siti Zuraina personally trained and taught students to be future archaeologists. In 2001, she won the Research Excellence Award from Universiti Sains Malaysia.

== Awards ==
In 1993, Siti Zuraina received the title of Dato' Paduka Mahkota Perak. She was awarded the prestigious Penang Government Medal and Order of the State of Perak for the Defender of the Crown. Her name and signature are also inscribed on many heritage plaques throughout Malaysia.

When she received the Merdeka award for Outstanding Scholastic Achievement in 2020, she dedicated the award to her late husband and her "dream team," that she worked with in Lenggong. She also won the Women at 50 Yale award in 2020.
