= Zakri Abdul Hamid =

Malaysian academic

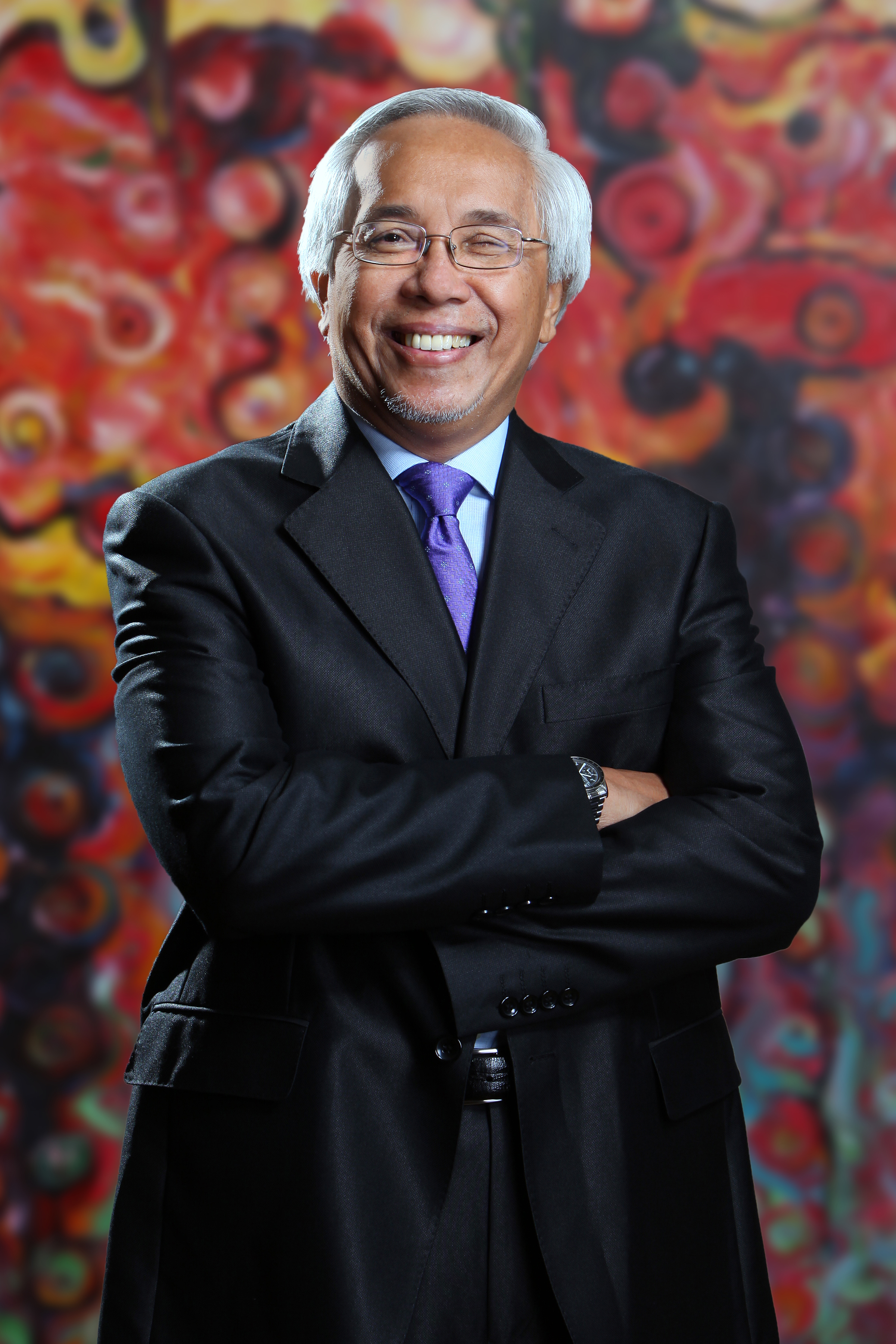
ZAKRI Abdul Hamid, founding Chair of the Intergovernmental Science-Policy Platform on Biodiversity and Ecosystem Services (IPBES). By Munzir Fauzi

Tan Sri Zakri bin Abdul Hamid (born 23 June 1948) is a scientific researcher, educator, administrator, and diplomat.

Awarded the federal honorific title "Tan Sri" by Malaysia's head of state in 2014, he served until 2016 as the founding Chair at the Intergovernmental Science-Policy Platform on Biodiversity and Ecosystem Services (IPBES), as the Science Advisor to Malaysia's Prime Minister, and on the UN Secretary-General's Scientific Advisory Board.

Among other positions, Zakri Co-Chairs the Secretariat of Malaysia's Global Science and Innovation Advisory Council (GSIAC), and Chairs the National Professors Council, the Malaysian Biotechnology Corporation (BIOTECHCORP), the National Foresight Institute and the Malaysian Industry-Government Group for High Technology (MIGHT).

Earlier positions included Co-Chair of the Board at the Millennium Ecosystem Assessment from July 2000 to 2005, Director of the Institute of Advanced Studies (IAS) of the United Nations University (UNU) from 2001 to 2008, and Deputy Vice-Chancellor at the National University of Malaysia (Universiti Kebangsaan Malaysia) from 1992 to 2000.

In 2015, he was the recipient for the Merdeka Award for the Environment and Planetary Health category

== Early life and education ==
Zakri was born on 23 June 1948 in Pahang, Malaysia. He earned a diploma from the College of Agriculture, Malaya in Serdang, Malaysia, in 1969, followed by a bachelor's degree in crop science from Louisiana State University, USA (1972), and Master’s (1974) and Doctorate (1976) degrees in plant breeding from Michigan State University.

He began lecturing at the National University of Malaysia (Universiti Kebangsaan Malaysia) in the late 1970s, rising quickly through the ranks to Head of the Department of Genetics (1978–1981), Associate Professor (1980), full Professor (1986), Dean of the Life Sciences Faculty (1987–1992), and Deputy Vice-Chancellor of the university (1992-2000).

== Career ==
Highlights:

1981–1989: Secretary-General of the Society for the Advancement of Breeding Research in Asia and Oceania, 1994–1998: Chair of a task force to prepare the National Policy on Biological Diversity, 1994-2000: Founding President of the Genetics Society of Malaysia, and 1996-2000: Founding Chair of the National Genetic Modification Advisory Committee.

1990–1992: Senior Malaysian delegate during negotiation of the U.N. Convention on Biological Diversity (CBD), later heading his country’s delegation to treaty’s Conference of the Parties (1993–2000). He also led Malaysia’s delegation in the early days of intergovernmental negotiations (1995–2000) of the Cartagena Protocol on Biosafety.

2000: Appointed Director of the United Nations University’s Yokohama Japan-based Institute of Advanced Studies (UNU-IAS), one of the UN’s largest research and training centers. During an eight-year tenure, he transformed UNU-IAS into an internationally respected institution active in a wide range of areas such as genetic bioprospecting, bio-diplomacy, governance, urban management, science policy for sustainable development, the protection of traditional knowledge and education for sustainable development.

2000: Elected Co-Chair of the Board of the Millennium Ecosystem Assessment (MA), one of the world’s largest-ever scientific collaborations. Over five years, the MA involved the combined efforts of more than 2,000 experts from 95 countries in an integrated scientific assessment of the consequences of ecosystem change for human well-being and of actions needed to address these threats. Represented on the multi-stakeholder Board: U.N. bodies, governments, NGOs, academia, business and indigenous peoples. Then-UN Secretary-General Kofi Annan, in his "Millennium Report" hailed the MA as “an outstanding example of the sort of international scientific and political cooperation that is needed to further the cause of sustainable development.”

2009: Named the Tuanku Chancellor Chair at Universiti Sains Malaysia (USM) . That same year he founded USM’s Centre for Global Sustainability Studies, a post-graduate think-tank on the challenges of climate change, environmental degradation, urban sprawl and other dimensions of global change.

2010: Appointed Science Advisor to the Prime Minister of Malaysia.

2011: Appointed Joint Co-Chair of the Secretariat of Malaysia's Global Science and Innovation Advisory Council (GSIAC), a unique assembly of an all-star international and national experts and leaders created to support sustainable development for Malaysia, chaired by Prime Minister Datuk Seri Najib Tun Razak.

2011: Named Joint Chair for the Malaysian Industry-Government Group for High Technology (MIGHT). MIGHT is a not-for-profit company under the purview of the Prime Minister of Malaysia building partnerships between industry, government and academia in support of the nation's drive to advance high technology competency.

2012: Co-chaired the High-Level International Advisory Committee of the World Conference on Justice, Governance and Law on Environmental Sustainability, held in conjunction with the UN Conference on Environment and Development (Rio+20). Also appointed to the UN Convention on Biological Diversity’s High-level Panel on Global Assessment of Resources for implementing the Strategic Plan for Biodiversity 2011-2020.

On 27 January 2013, at the first plenary meeting of 105 Member States, elected founding Chair of the Intergovernmental Platform on Biodiversity and Ecosystem Services, a new intergovernmental body dedicated to curbing an accelerating worldwide loss of biodiversity and degradation of ecosystem services. Often likened to an IPCC-like body for biodiversity, the IPBES will bridge the gap between scientists and policy makers, providing up to date, accurate, impartial data and scientific information to enable the formulation of better policy response in managing biodiversity.

October, 2013, one of 26 scientists named to the UN Secretary-General Scientific Advisory Board, which convened for its inaugural meeting in Berlin on January 30, 2014.

In September 2018, he was installed as the Pro Chancellor of Multimedia University, Malaysia.

== Personal life ==
Zakri is married and has five children.

== Honors and awards ==
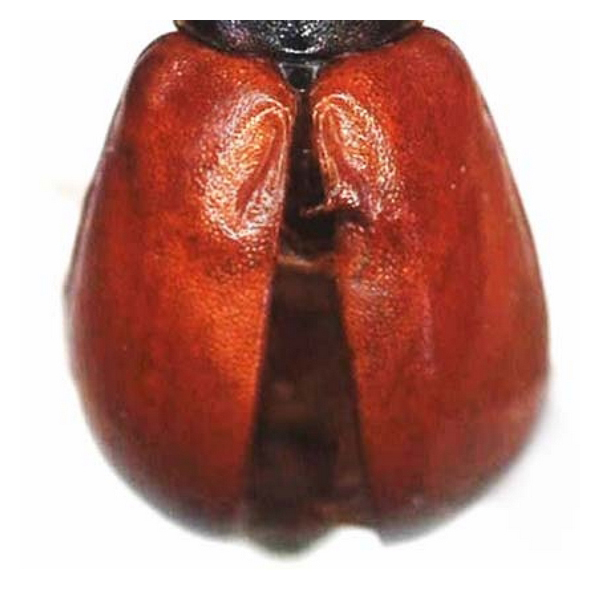
Paleosepharia zakrii, a Chrysomelidae beetle named after Zakri

- The Fulbright-Hays Malaysian Lecturer Award by the Malaysian-America Commission on Educational Exchange (1981)
- The title "Dato" by the Sultan of Pahang (1991)
- The Kestria Mangku Negara (KMN) by the Malaysian King (1993)
- Foundation Fellow, Academy of Sciences of Malaysia (1995)
- Fellow, Third World Academy of Sciences (TWAS) (1996)
- The Excellent Service Award from the Academic Association of UKM (1997)
- The Langkawi Award for outstanding contribution in the field of the environment (1998)
- The Rotary Research Foundation Gold Medal (Agricultural and Biological Sciences) (1999)
- Fellow, World Academy of Art and Science (2003)
- Fellow, Islamic World Academy of Sciences (2006)
- PGM (Genetics Society of Malaysia) Excellence Award (2011)
- The title "Dato’ Sri," conferred by the Sultan of Pahang (2012)
- The federal title "Tan Sri," conferred by Malaysia's supreme head of state (2014)
- MIDORI Prize (2018)
- Asian Scientist 100, Asian Scientist (2019)
- Three species have been named after him: a beetle (Paleosepharia zakrii), a cicada (Pomponia zakrii) and a pitcher plant (Nepenthes zakriana).

== Appointments ==
- Chair, National Science and Research Council
- Council Chair, National Professors Council
- Chair, Malaysian Biotechnology Corporation
- Chair, National Foresight Institute
- Co-Chair, Malaysian Industry-Government Group on High Technology (MIGHT)
- Co-Chair, Aerospace Malaysia Innovation Centre (AMIC)
- Chair, Subsidiary Body on Scientific, Technical and Technological Advice (SBSTTA), Convention on Biological Diversity (1997-1999)
- Co-Chair, Millennium Ecosystem Assessment (2000–2005)
- Co-chair (2012) of the High-Level International Advisory Committee of the World Conference on Justice, Governance and Law on Environmental Sustainability, held in conjunction with the UN Conference on Environment and Development (Rio+20).
- UN Convention on Biological Diversity High-level Panel on Global Assessment of Resources for implementing the Strategic Plan for Biodiversity 2011–2020.
- Past Vice-President, Academy of Sciences of the Developing World (TWAS) Executive Board of the International Council for Science (ICSU)
- Science Council, Consultative Group on International Agricultural Research (CGIAR) International Atomic Energy Agency (IAEA) Senior Advisory Group on Technical Assistance and Cooperation
- U.N. Food and Agricultural Organization (FAO) Expert Panel of Advisors on Evaluation of Corporate Strategy
- Academic Advisory Committee of the Distinguished Scholar Award of the Arab Fund Fellowship Program (Kuwait)
- Board of Trustees, Institute for Global Environmental Strategies (Japan)
- International Advisory Board for the “Planet under Pressure” conference (London, 2012) New York Academy of Sciences (NYAS) President’s Council
- Academy of Sciences Malaysia World Academy of Art and Science Islamic World Academy of Sciences
- Pro Chancellor of Multimedia University, Malaysia (2018 - now)

== Education ==
- 1966–1969 College of Agriculture, Malaya, Malaysia Diploma
- 1970–1972 Louisiana State University, USA Bachelor of Science
- 1972–1974 Michigan State University, USA Master of Science
- 1974–1976 Michigan State University, USA PhD

== Academic appointments ==
- 1976–1979 Lecturer, Department of Biology, Universiti Kebangsaan Malaysia
- 1978–1981 Head, Department of Genetics, Universiti Kebangsaan Malaysia
- 1980–1986 Associate Professor, Department of Genetics, Universiti Kebangsaan Malaysia
- 1983–1987 Deputy Dean, Faculty of Life Sciences, Universiti Kebangsaan Malaysia
- 1987–1992 Dean, Faculty of Life Sciences, Universiti Kebangsaan Malaysia
- 1986–2000 Professor, Department of Genetics, Universiti Kebangsaan Malaysia
- 1992–2000 Deputy Vice Chancellor, Universiti Kebangsaan Malaysia
- 2003 Emeritus Professor, Universiti Kebangsaan Malaysia
- 2009–2010 Holder of Tuanku Chancellor Chair, Universiti Sains Malaysia
- 2001–2008 Director, Institute of Advanced Studies, United Nations University
- 2009–2010 Founding Director, Centre for Global Sustainability Studies, USM

== Selected boards and committees ==
- 1981–1989 Secretary General, Society for the Advancement of Breeding Research in Asia and Oceania
- 1994–1998 Chairman, National Task Force to draft National Policy on Biological Diversity, Malaysia
- 1996–2000 Chairman, Genetic Modification Advisory Committee, Malaysia
- 1991–1992 Member, Malaysian delegation to the intergovernmental negotiations on the Convention on Biological Diversity
- 1993–2000 Member, Malaysian delegation to the meetings of the Conference of Parties of the Convention on Biological Diversity
- 1995–2000 Head, Malaysian delegation to the intergovernmental negotiations of the Cartagena Protocol on Biosafety
- 1997–1999 Chairman, Subsidiary Body on Scientific, Technical and Technological Advice, Convention on Biological Diversity
- 2001–2005 Co-Chair, Board of the Millennium Ecosystem Assessment
- 2001–2005 Vice President, Academy of Sciences of the Developing World
- 2007 Member, First External Review of the Harvest Plus Challenge Program, Science Council, Consultative Group on International Agricultural Research
- 2008 Member, FAO Expert Panel of Advisors on Corporate Strategy
- 2008–2010 Member, IAEA Senior Advisory Group on Technical Assistance and Cooperation
- 2002–2008 Member, Board of Trustees, Institute of Global Environmental Studies, Japan
- 2008–2012 Member, International Council of Science (ICSU Executive Board)
- 2010 Member, Inter Academy Council Committee Reviewing the Process and Procedures of the Intergovernmental Panel on Climate Change (IPCC)
- 2010–2012 Member, International Advisory Committee, “Planet under Pressure” London 2012
- 2009–2012 Chairman, National Professors Council, Malaysia
- 2010 Chairman, National Science and Research Council, Malaysia
- 2011 Co-Chair, Malaysian Industry-Government Group in High Technology (MIGHT)
- 2011–2012 Co-Chair, United Nations Environment Programme (UNEP) High-Level International Advisory Committee on Justice, Governance and Law for Environmental Sustainability, Rio de Janeiro, June 2012
- 2012 Member, Convention on Biological Diversity’s High-level Panel on Global Assessment of Resources for implementing the Strategic Plan for Biodiversity 2011–2020
- 2012 Member, New York Academy of Sciences (NYAS) President’s Council
- 2017 - 2019 Chairman, Board of Directors, University of Malaya

== Books ==
- Plant Breeding and Genetic Engineering (Editor), SABRAO (1988)
- Genetic Resources of Underutilized Plants in Malaysia (Editor), MNCPGR (1989)
- Plant Genetic Resources (in Malay), DBP (1993)
- Prospects in Biodiversity Prospecting (Editor), GSM (1995)
- Ecosystems and Human Well-being (Synthesis) (member of core writing team), Millennium Ecosystem Assessment, Island Press (2005)
- Agriculture, Human Security, and Global Peace: A Crossroad in African Development (co-editor with M. Taeb) Purdue University Press (2008)
