= Oligodon booliati =

Conservation status
- Critically Endangered (IUCN 3.1)

Scientific classification
- Kingdom: Animalia
- Phylum: Chordata
- Class: Reptilia
- Order: Squamata
- Suborder: Serpentes
- Family: Colubridae
- Genus: Oligodon
- Species: O. booliati

Binomial name
- Oligodon booliati Leong & Grismer, 2004
- Oligodon booliati is only known from the Tioman Island, Malaysia

Species of snake

Oligodon booliati, also known as the Boo-Liat's kukri snake, is a species of snake of the family Colubridae. It is endemic to the Tioman Island, Malaysia. The snake was named for Malaysian zoologist Lim Boo Liat.

== Habitat and conservation ==
Oligodon booliati is a fossorial species that is found on leaf litter in lowland forest. Its range is restricted to the forested area of the Tioman Island, which is suffering from deforestation and could see the remaining forest disappearing in the near future.
