= Star Blanket Cree Nation =

First Nations band government in Saskatchewan, Canada

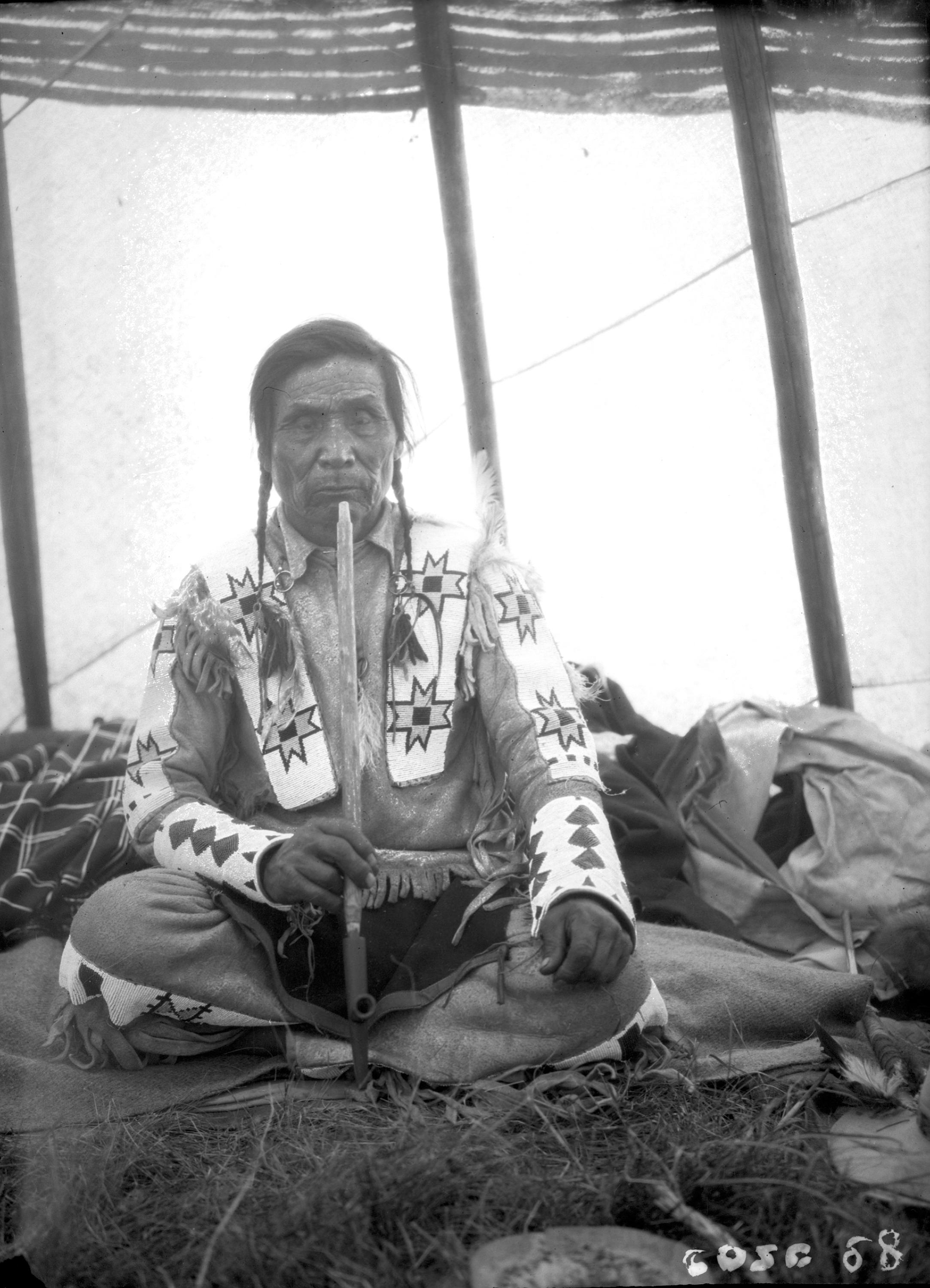
A member of the Star Blanket Cree Nation in 1930

Star Blanket Cree Nation (Cree: ᐊᒑᐦᑯᓴ ᑳ ᐅᑕᑯᐦᐱᐟ acâhkosa kâ-otakohpit, meaning One who has stars as a blanket) is a First Nations band government in Saskatchewan, Canada. Its reserves are in the Fort Qu'Appelle area. The Star Blanket Cree Nation is one of the bands covered by Treaty 4.

== Etymology ==
The Star Blanket Cree Nation is named for its Chief Ahchacoosacootacoopetis (acâhkosa kâ-otakohpit, "one who has stars for a blanket"), who assumed the position in 1875.

== Indian reserves ==
The band governs 14 reserves:

- Star Blanket Indian Reserve No. 83, 18 km northeast of Fort Qu'appelle, 5611.90 ha.
- Star Blanket Indian Reserve No. 83-D, 253.10 ha.
- Star Blanket Indian Reserve No. 83B, Lot 35 & 36 Block 3 in Town of Fort Qu'Appelle, 0.20 ha.
- Star Blanket Indian Reserve No. 83C, 18 km northeast of Lipton, 320 ha.
- Star Blanket Indian Reserve No. 83E, 318.50 ha.
- Star Blanket Indian Reserve No. 83F, 65.10 ha.
- Star Blanket Indian Reserve No. 83G, 128.20 ha.
- Star Blanket Indian Reserve No. 83H, 65.10 ha.
- Star Blanket Indian Reserve No. 83I, 191.80 ha.
- Star Blanket Indian Reserve No. 83J, 260.60 ha.
- Star Blanket Indian Reserve No. 83K, 375.40 ha.
- Star Blanket Indian Reserve No. 83L, 128.10 ha.
- Atim Ka-mihkosit Reserve (ᐊᑎᒼ ᑳ ᒥᐦᑯᓯᐟ, atim kâ-mihkosit), 13.20 ha.
- Treaty Four Reserve Grounds Indian Reserve No. 77, adjacent to and west of Fort Qu'appelle, 37.90 ha. (shared with 33 other bands
- Wa-Pii Moos-toosis (White Calf) Indian Reserve No. 83A, 22.30 ha.

== Chiefs ==
Chief Ahchacoosacootacoopetis (acâhkosa kâ-otakohpit, "one who has stars for a blanket"), who assumed the position in 1875.

Chief Michael Starr c. 2019

== History ==
In September 2016, they became a signatory of the Buffalo Treaty.

== See also ==
- Balcarres, Saskatchewan (location of their postal address)
- Division No. 6, Saskatchewan
- Lebret Eagles (Hockey team owned by the First Nation)
