= Javier Padilla Bernáldez =

Secretary of State for Health in Spain

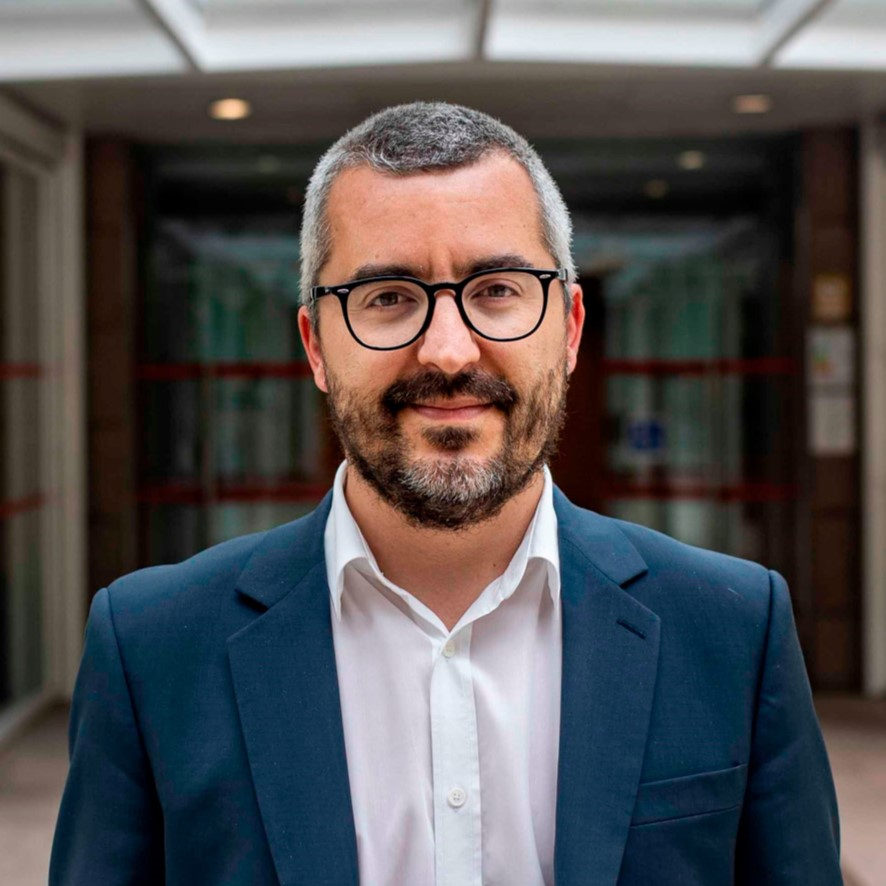
Javier Padilla Bernáldez, Secretary of Health, Ministry of Health (Spain)

Javier Padilla Bernáldez (born 1983) is a Spanish doctor and politician serving as the secretary of state for health for the Ministry of Health of Spain and a senior member of Mas Madrid political party. He serves as a member of the Global Council on Inequality, AIDS, and Pandemics.

== Life and education ==
Padilla graduated in Medicine from the Autonomous University of Madrid, specializing in Family and Community Medicine. He has a Master's degree in Public Health and Health Management and a Master's degree in Health and Drug Economics.

== Career ==
=== Medical career ===
Padilla is a family and community doctor, with a background in health economics, public health and philosophy. His primary medical practice was in primary care as a family doctor, in several health centers in the Community of Madrid.

=== Author ===
He is the author of several books on health and healthcare including Epidemiocracy (Captain Swing, 2020) and Who should we let go of? (Captain Swing, 2019) and editor of Health or Barbarism (Paspasueños, 2017). He has also published in peer-reviewed public health journals on hospitals, COVID-19, and inequality.

=== Political career ===
Padilla is a senior member of Más Madrid, a social justice-oriented political organization focused on ending inequality in the provision of healthcare and other public services in Madrid. Padilla Bernáldez became Spain's Secretary of State for Health in November 2023. Previously he served a member of the Madrid Assembly and as a public policy advisor for En Comú Podem in the Spanish Congress of Deputies (2016–2017). He has been particularly engaged in work on pharmaceutical policy. He has also defined his political career on tackling inequality--at the Ministry of Health and more broadly.
