= Adeeba Kamarulzaman =

Malaysian epidemiologist

Yang Berbahagia Professor Dato' Adeeba Kamarulzaman DJMK DPMP
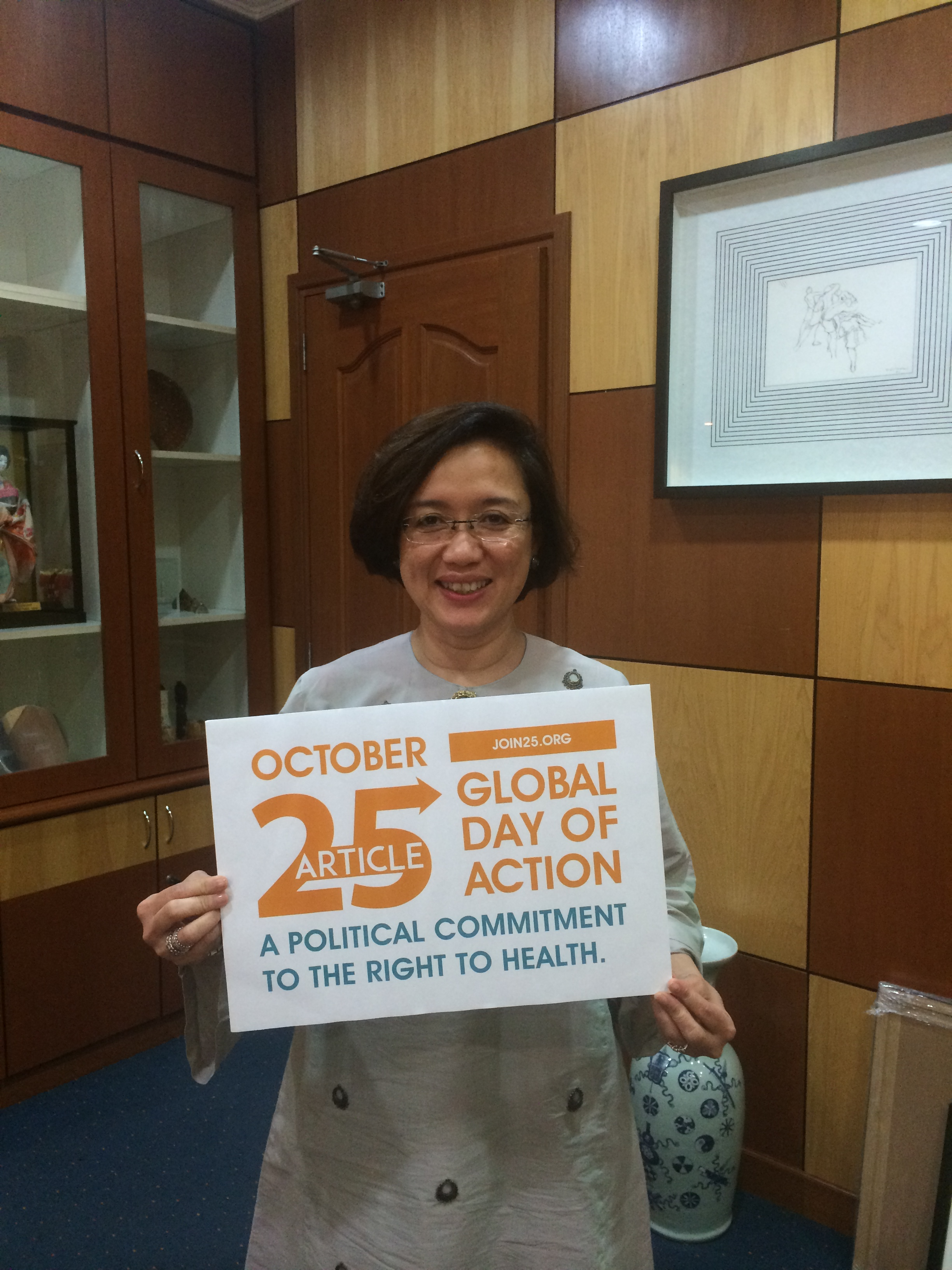
- Adeeba in October 2014.
- Born: 16 December 1963 (age 62); Kota Bharu, Kelantan, Malaysia
- Occupations: Academician, scientist, epidemiologist

Academic background
- Education: Royal Australasian College of Physicians; Monash University

Adeeba binti Kamarulzaman (born 16 December 1963) is a Malaysian epidemiologist. As an infectious disease specialist, she is known for her work in championing prevention and treatment methods of HIV/AIDS. She is also serves as a chairman of Malaysian AIDS Foundation and an adjunct associate professor at Yale University.

== Early life and education ==
Adeeba was born on 16 December 1963 in Kota Bharu, Kelantan. She graduated from the Monash University in 1987 and trained in internal medicine and infectious diseases at the Monash Medical Centre and Fairfield Infectious Diseases Hospital, Melbourne, Australia. She also holds the position of Dean of the Faculty of Medicine, University of Malaya and Adjunct Associate Professor at Yale University. Adeeba also established the Centre of Excellence for Research in AIDS (CERiA) which conducts multidisciplinary research on HIV and AIDS from clinical to public health and policy research.

== Career ==
Adeeba started her career at the Universiti Malaya Medical Centre (UMMC) with a focus on preventing outbreaks of infectious diseases such as HIV, dengue, tuberculosis and new viruses.

In 1997, she set up the Infectious Disease Unit Penyakit Berjangkit at the UMMC and in 2008, she set up Centre of Excellence for Research in AIDS (CERiA) at the University of Malaya. She is one of the most important medical experts who conducts research and finds appropriate treatments when the 1999 Nipah virus outbreak took place. In January 2006, she was appointed as the President of the Malaysian AIDS Council (MAM), succeeding Marina Mahathir.

Her achievements were also recognized at the Tun Mahathir Science Award and the Merdeka Award for her role as a member of the UM Nipah Investigation Team. At the international level, in addition to being a member of the World Health Organization (WHO) Council, Adeeba is a member of the UNAIDS Scientific Expert Panel on HIV.

Adeeba has also been appointed as an advisor to various committees under WHO on HIV and AIDS. She played a key role in the formation and activities and collaborative initiatives of the regional HIV research network, the TREAT Asia.

In 2012, she was named the first recipient of the Global Advance Australia Award in the Alumni category while in 2015, her alma mater, the Monash University, awarded her the title of Honorary Doctor of Laws for her contributions to medicine and health.

In 2020, Adeeba was chosen as the first Asian president of the International AIDS Society. The following year, she was appointed a member of the WHO's Scientific Council, a group that advises on scientific and technological advances that impact public health worldwide.

In September 2022, she was appointed as the new Commissioner of the Global Commission on Drug Policy, making her the first Malaysian to hold the position.

== Honours ==
- Kelantan
  - Knight Commander of the Order of the Life of the Crown of Kelantan (DJMK) – Dato' (2022)
- Perak
  - Knight Commander of the Order of the Perak State Crown (DPMP) – Dato' (2016)
