= Obinna Onwujekwe =

Nigerian medical doctor and academic

Obinna Emmanuel Onwujekwe is a Nigerian medical doctor who serves as Professor of Health Economics and Policy and Pharmacoeconomics in the Departments of Health Administration & Management and Pharmacology and Therapeutics, College of Medicine, based in University of Nigeria.

== Early life and education ==
Onwujekwe qualified as a medical doctor from University of Nigeria and later obtained a MSc in Health Economics. He obtained a Certificate in District Health Management from the Swiss Tropical Institute Basel. He then proceeded to the United Kingdom where he bagged a PhD in Health Economics and Policy from the London School of Hygiene and Tropical Medicine.

== Career ==
Onwujekwe was a member of a DFID-funded Consortium for Research on Equitable Health Systems (CREHS) from 2006 to 2010. He was also a member of the European Commission-funded Eval-Health project from 2011 to 2014. He was also the Dean in the Faculty of Health Sciences and Technology at UNN between August 2012 to July 2014; and the Head of Department of Health Administration and Management between 2005 and 2012.

Since 2007, Onwujekwe has served as a Director at the West African Health Economics Network (WAHEN). He has also been the National Coordinator of the Nigerian Malaria Control Association (NaMCA) from 2009; the President of the Nigerian Health Economics Association (NiHEA) since 2010; and the Chairman of the University of Nigeria Senate Research Grants Committee since 2014.

=== Academic contributions ===
Onwujekwe conducts research on health economics - especially looking at the impact of the stigma of HIV/AIDS in Nigeria on the willingness to access anti-retroviral drugs, and malaria prevention strategies. His work has been important in informing international aid agencies such as DFID's aid agencies.

== Other activities ==
- World Health Organization (WHO), Member of the African Advisory Committee for Research and Development
- Network for Health Equity and Development (NHED), Member of the Board of Directors

== Publications ==
=== Journal articles ===
Onwujekwe has authored and co-authored dozens of peer-reviewed articles including:

- Obinna Onwujekwe; Laura D. Howe; Bruna Galobardes; Alicia Matijasevich; David Gordon; Deborah Johnston; Rita Patel; Elizabeth A. Webb; Debbie A. Lawlor; James R. Hargreaves (2012). "Measuring socio-economic position for epidemiological studies in low-and middle-income countries: a methods of measurement in epidemiology paper". International Journal of Epidemiology. 41 (3): 871–886. doi:10.1093/ije/dys037. PMC 3396323. PMID 22438428.
- Obinna E. Onwujekwe; Benjamin SC Uzochukwu (2004). "Socio-economic differences and health seeking behaviour for the diagnosis and treatment of malaria: a case study of four local government areas operating the Bamako initiative programme in south-east Nigeria". International Journal for Equity in Health. 3 (1): 6. doi:10.1186/1475-9276-3-6. PMC 544024. PMID 15202941.
- Obinna E. Onwujekwe; Kara Hanson; Julia Fox-Rushby (2004). "Inequalities in purchase of mosquito nets and willingness to pay for insecticide-treated nets in Nigeria: Challenges for malaria control interventions". Malaria Journal. 3 (1): 6. doi:10.1186/1475-2875-3-6. PMC 395839. PMID 15023234.
- Obinna Onwujekwe; Reginald Chima; Paul Okonkwo (2000). "Economic burden of malaria illness on households versus that of all other illness episodes: a study in five malaria holo-endemic Nigerian communities". Health Policy. 54 (2): 143–159. doi:10.1016/S0168-8510(00)00105-6. PMID 11094267.
