= Atim Ka-mihkosit Reserve =

Indian reserve in Saskatchewan, Canada

Coordinates: 50°25′09″N 104°34′53″W

Atim Kâ-mihkosit Reserve
- Indian reserve
- Atim Kâ-mihkosit Indian Reserve
- Location in Saskatchewan
- First Nation: Star Blanket
- Country: Canada
- Province: Saskatchewan

Area
  - Total: 13.2 ha (33 acres)

The Atim Kâ-mihkosit Reserve (Cree: ᐊᑎᒼ ᑳ ᒥᐦᑯᓯᐟ atim kâ-mihkosit, literal meaning Horse that is red) is an Indian reserve of the Star Blanket Cree Nation in Saskatchewan. An urban reserve, it is located in the city of Regina, where it encompasses the First Nations University of Canada.

== See also ==
- List of Indian reserves in Saskatchewan
