= Chris Bukari Atim =

Ghanaian politician

Chris Atim (born 1953) was one of the seven original members of the PNDC that took power in Ghana on 31 December 1981. It remained in power until 7 January 1993.

Since leaving his government post he has gained a PhD from the University of Sussex and worked extensively in health financing in many African countries with a variety of organizations, including the HLSP Institute (UK), Abt Associates Inc. (USA), and the International Labour Organization. Over the period 1999 to 2004, he worked as a Regional Advisor for West and Central Africa and Senior Economist for USAID’s Partnerships for Health Reform project.

He is now an executive director of the African Health Economics and Policy Association (AfHEA) and a senior health economist at the World Bank office in Senegal.
