= Joy Atim =

Ugandan businesswoman and politician

- Born: 15 September 1968 (age 57); Lira
- Citizenship: Uganda
- Occupations: Social worker, politician
- Years active: 2000–present
- Spouse: (Ongom Innocent)

Atim Joy Ongom (born 15 September 1968) is a Ugandan businesswoman and politician, who served as the member of Parliament representing the Lira District Women Constituency in the 10th Parliament (2016 to 2021).

== Early life and education ==
Joy Atim was born on 15 September 1968 in Lira District, in the Northern Region of Uganda. She attended local schools for her pre-university education. In 1989 she was admitted to Uganda College of Commerce Aduku, in Aduku, Apac District, graduating two years later with a Diploma in Business Studies (DipBS). In 2011, she graduated from Kampala International University with a Bachelor of Public Administration (BPA).

== Career ==
In 1993, Atim was hired by the firm Riclen Printers, working there as a cashier for six years, until 1999. She then moved to Jocent Enterprises, where she served as the managing director until 2011. Since 2005 she has been the managing director at Hillside Annex, a position she still maintains while a member of Parliament.

== Political career ==
During the 2006–2011 election cycle, Atim was elected to the Lira District Local Government, serving there as a District Councillor. In 2011, she contested to represent the women in Lira District in the 9th Parliament (2011 to 2016). During that cycle, she ran as an Independent candidate and won.

During the 2016 elections she ran under the opposition Uganda People's Congress (UPC) political party's banner, was re-elected and is the incumbent. She is one of the members of the Uganda parliament who are opposed to the amendment of the constitution, to remove presidential age limits. Her political rallies have been targeted by the Uganda Police Force, resulting in injuries and hospitalizations. However, in the 2021 general polls, she lost to Minister Dr. Jane Ruth Aceng.

== Family ==
Ongom is married to Ongom Innocent.

== Other considerations ==
In the 10th Parliament, Atim was a member of two parliamentary committees: the Appointments Committee and the Budget Committee.

== See also ==
- List of members of the tenth Parliament of Uganda
- List of members of the ninth Parliament of Uganda
