= Lady Athlyne =

1908 novel by Bram Stoker

- First edition
- Author: Bram Stoker
- Language: English
- Genre: Romance Novel
- Publisher: Heinemann
- Publication date: 1908
- Publication place: United Kingdom
- Media type: Print (hardcover)
- Pages: 333

Lady Athlyne is a romance novel by Bram Stoker, written and published in 1908 in London by Heinemann. The novel was published in the U.S. the same year by Paul R. Reynolds. It was published one year before the release of Stoker's The Lady of the Shroud.

The novel is a romantic adventure novel about Joy Ogilvie, an American woman who impersonates the wife of the Irish aristocrat Lord Athlyne, who becomes infatuated with the imposter. A romance results that touches on the themes of mistaken identity, honor, and social rebellion.

The novel focuses on the theme of the New Woman, exploring the changing role of women in society and the greater impetus for emancipation and independence.

== Background ==
Abraham (Bram) Stoker was born in Clontarf, Dublin, Ireland on 8 November 1847. Due to a childhood illness (which was never identified) that kept Stoker bedridden until about the age of seven.

He spent much of his childhood in isolation. He became familiar with Irish Folklore.

He attended Trinity College Dublin, where he graduated in 1870. In his Personal Reminiscences of Henry Irving he wrote that he graduated with honours in Pure Mathematics, but no record was found in the Trinity College archives. A few years before his graduation, Stoker obtained a position in the Civil Service at Dublin Castle.

He moved to London in 1878 to work as an acting manager at the Lyceum Theatre. Stoker used influences from Irish folk tales and the theater that combined several different elements, such as romance, history, adventure, and his own supernatural influences, that make his writings unique.

== Historical context ==
The novel was published while many different events were transpiring in the United Kingdom. England was preparing to host the Olympic Games in London. These games were to take place during April 1908. At this time it would have only been the fourth consecutive time these games were held since they were disbanded. In more of political and military strategies there were many treaties and precursors to World War I.

In 1894, Russia and France formed an alliance. On 21 August Britain and Russia signed a treaty with Afghanistan, Persia (modern day Iran) and Tibet. They then formed the Triple Entente. In 1904 Britain wanted Russia to come out of its self-isolation and join the rest of Europe. Britain wanted Russia to join the Entente Cordiale or what is known as, "The Friendly Agreement". Secretary of State Sir Edward Grey made Britain a part of the Triple Entente which had to the goal of these three past enemies supporting one another. While they did not have to go to war on behalf of any nation, they were expected to at least support it. While these enemies had been fighting on and off for many years, especially when it came to colonial territories in Africa, they wanted to bang together because they were concerned about Germany's growing power.

It was not only large countries that were signing treaties, however. Many smaller nations were signing treaties in the hopes of not being involved in a European conflict at all. One of these nations was Belgium. They signed the Treaty of London in 1864 in the hopes of staying a neutral party in case any issues were to arise.

== Publication information ==
The novel was first published in the United Kingdom by William Heinemann in London in 1908.

In the United States, it was published in 1909 by Frank Lovell & Company in New York.

After the novel's debut in England, it was also published in the "dailies", or in daily newspapers in The United States. Those newspapers were The Evening Star, Utica Press, and The Evansville Courtier.

An abridged version of this text was written. It appeared in the Fort Worth Star Telegram in Fort Worth, Texas. The first publication was on 16 April 1909 and the last was on 2 June 1909. Unlike the full version, the abridged version only had twenty-one chapters. It is not known who edited the abridgement.

== Introduction ==
In addition to these political changes that were occurring, Finland made a major social change. They were the first European country to give women the right to vote. Most nineteenth century literature places women as secondary to men in social value. Lady Athlyne is written in a manner that falls along the same lines as She and Dracula when bringing forth the idea of "The New Woman".

The woman does not follow the typical societal procedures (according to the novels). In these novels these types of women meet horrific ends. Therefore, the lessons in these two novels particularly share the concept that "The New Woman" goes against society.

In Stoker's novel Lady Athlyne he has a character that embodies traits of "The New Woman" which would be Joy's aunt, Miss Judith Hayes. Miss Hayes ignores her brother in-law (Joy's father) when he deems a visitor unacceptable for his daughter to associate with because her father finds the man suspicious. Since this young visitor is not forthcoming with information to impress Joy's father he deduces that this young man cannot be from good stock, and regardless of his manners, is not fit to see his daughter romantically. Miss Hayes, however, sees two young people that she believes are meant for one another and intends for them to be together. She does not take anything that Joy's father wants into consideration. She purposely sends letters to let Lord Athlyne know where Joy and her father will be vacationing together before Miss Hayes and Joy's mother meet the father/daughter pair.

This is just one example of the many that this novel holds for the differences between "The New Woman" and the woman that obeys men and "properly" fulfills her role in society. Miss Hayes is not married and she mentions this frequently to Joy as if Miss Hayes regrets her unmarried status and wishes that her niece will never have to face this burden.

== Main characters ==
- Miss Judith/Judy Hayes - Joy's Aunt who possibly portrays some of the characteristics of "The New Woman"
- Joy Ogilvie - Main character and female love interest to Lord Athlyne
- Colonel Ogilvie - Joy's father- standard male character in Adventure Fiction genre (white, male, British, and very much perpetuates gender stereotypes. For example, males provide money and food for the home; while the wife takes care of the home and has kids
- Lord Athlyne/ Richard Hardy - the male love interest of Joy Ogilvie. The reason Lord Athlyne goes by two different character titles is due to the fact that he lies about his identity to Joy and her family for half the novel.
- Mrs. O’Brien - Lord Athlyne's housekeeper from his childhood. She plays a mother-like figure in his life and thinks highly of Lord Athlyne.

== Themes ==
- Unknown - Object of the unknown or the unforeseeable in the novel is a reoccurring concept in Stoker's work. In Dracula, there is a lot of the plot that is unknown; Stoker carries over some of this mystique to Lady Athlyne.
- Castles - Part of a well-known element or theme of the Gothic would be spooky castles that rise up out of the mist (again echoing Dracula here) Lord Athlyne owns and lives in a castle
- Foreshadowing - Mrs. O’Brien on one of the many trips that Joy and her family take throughout the novel makes a prediction saying that by linking Joy's name to Lord Athlyne's they have "sealed her fate" (60).
- Romance - Involves a novel that takes the supernatural and focuses into a loving relationship
- Suspense - The novel can be suspenseful at times when Stoker makes the reader wait for the moment where Lord Athlyne reveals who he truly is
- Weather - When traveling to Italy for the first time the group encounters bad weather. Luckily for them, it does not end up being an omen for something bad to come.

== Plot summary ==
- Chapters 1-3: The novel begins on a journey from New York to Italy. Joy and her Aunt Judith meet Mrs. O’Brian who claims to have fostered Earl Athlyne. Since Mrs. O’Brien describes the Earl Athlyne's son in such great detail all of the women, including Joy, begin to develop an interest in a man they had never met or heard of until that moment. Her Aunt Judy even calls her Lady Athlyne. The mysterious woman warns them that by linking her name to his that they have sealed her fate and Aunt Judy believes that there is truth to this statement. At first, the women are careful not to tell anyone about their joke or their (secret) but it is used in front of Joy's father by mistake. He warns her that by linking her name to a man she does not know can harm her in the future.
- Chapters 4-6: The news that there is a young woman using Lord Athlyne's name arrives to him while he is held as a military prisoner. One of the guards was bribed by one of Lord Athlyne's friends on the outside to bring the news to Lord Athlyne. This upset Lord Athlyne greatly due to the fact that it will inhibit him in the future from making a decent match and being able to find a wife who will help him with his estate. He vows to himself that he will find this woman and he will not use his name in order to avoid upsetting her when they first meet. He eventually journeys to New York under an alias, Mr. Richard Hardy, in order to deter Joy from continuing to link her name to his even as a simply joke in case it impedes him from marrying in the future.
- Chapter 7-11: While minding his own business by touring through New York, Lord Athlyne spots a woman on a runaway mare through the city streets of New York. He eventually ends up saving the young woman who it turns out, is Joy. Soon after, Colonel Ogilvie is on the scene to make sure that his daughter is not hurt. He thanks the man that saved her. The colonel then asks the name of this handsome and masculine stranger to which he replies, "Richard Hardy" (110). Since Lord Athlyne still had not found the woman he is searching for to stop her from using his name; he did not want to use his actual name and scare her from the continuation to link her name to his. While he likes the colonel from the start and feels guilty for having to conceal his true identity, he very much wishes to protect his character for the time being. However, he is then invited to dinner with her family in order for them to display their gratitude.
- Chapters 11-15: Joy's father, Colonel Ogilvie, spends most of dinner interrogating Mr. Hardy/Lord Athlyne. He asks about the clubs he belongs to, who his people are, if he is well travelled, and where his home is. Richard Hardy dodges each question and, in turn, arouses the suspensions of the colonel during dinner. The colonel believes that this man might have saved his daughter's life, but he is not fit to associate with her. Meanwhile, Joy's aunt and mother are noticing the looks that Richard Hardy and Joy are giving one another. They appear to be interested in one another. While Joy's mother does not want to ignore her husband's wishes, her sister Miss Hayes, decides that she is going to find a way to help these young people come together.
- Chapter 16-20: Richard Hardy says that he must leave in order to attend to some business at home. Since he did not find the woman that he was searching for he has decided to give up the search. He is going to miss Joy and leaves his address at a hotel in Ireland for them to send him letters. It turns out this is very fortunate. Since Joy and her father have chosen to go abroad again, this time without Miss Judith/Miss Hayes, she is able to send Lord Athlyne letters pertaining to Joy's whereabouts. These letters allow Lord Athlyne to track down joy and while her father is out visiting some friends, Joy decides to go on a motorcar ride, unchaperoned, with Richard Hardy/Lord Athlyne. This is where Joy is intentionally deceiving her father and leaves a note in an attempt to make amends by letting him know that she has gone out with a friend for a ride. She does not specify which friend though for fear of angering her father and getting Mr. Hardy/Lord Athlyne into trouble.
- Chapters 21-33: Joy spends too long with Richard Hardy/ Lord Athlyne because they were having a lovely picnic in the grass where he proposed to Joy and she accepted. It is after this that Joy realizes she is late to return to her hotel by the time her mother and aunt are meeting supposed to be meeting Joy and her father. So Athlyne decides to speed back into town, is pulled over, and is placed in jail for the night for going excessively above the speed limit. Meanwhile, Joy takes the car in an attempt to possibly make it on time to her family reunion. Unfortunately for her, she ends up lost because of a fog and is about 100 miles outside of town. She stops at a nearby place to request lodging for the night. When the woman asks for her name Joy replies, "Lady Athlyne" because she does not wish to use her real name and instead chooses her old nickname. The woman recognizing that surname at once gives Joy some of the nicer rooms in her house. Soon, a strange man came and knocked on the same woman's door. He too requested lodgings and did not want to woman to make a fuss over him. When she asked his name, the man replied, "Richard Hardy". Since Joy had gone missing for a night and had only left a note saying she was going out motorcaring with a friend her family was very concerned. Her father then hires a driver, car, and pilot to help him go and retrieve his daughter since her car/Athlyne's car had broken down. Her father finds them both canoodling together and then a discussion about his daughter's honor begins. Soon enough Lord Athlyne reveals his true identity and explains his Scottish roots. They eventually arrive at the conclusion that because of a Scottish rule of an "irregular" marriage where if both parties consent then they are married even if they do not have a document. After much debate, they decided to formally marry on a piece of paper in order to avoid possible legal complications. Joy then truly becomes Lady Athlyne.
