= Gibbet Hill (short story) =

1890 short story by Bram Stoker

- Short story by Bram Stoker
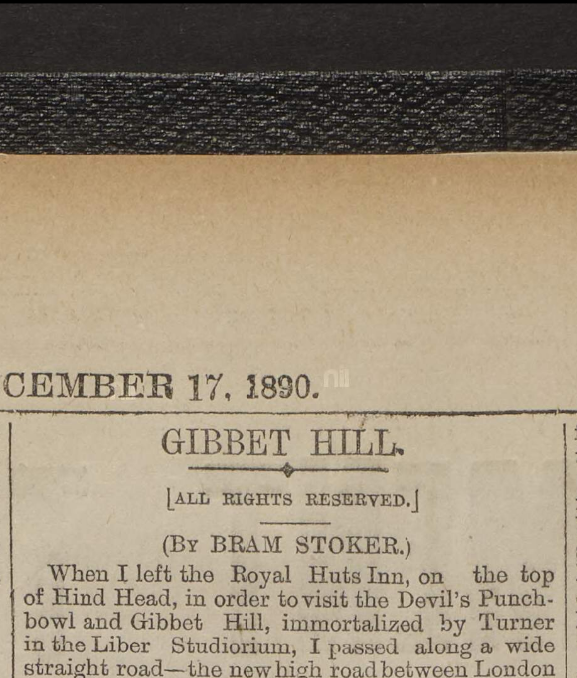

Text available at Wikisource
- Country: Ireland
- Language: English
- Genre: Gothic horror

Publication
- Published in: Daily Express
- Publication type: Periodical
- Media type: Newspaper supplement
- Publication date: 17 December 1890

"Gibbet Hill" is an 1890 gothic horror short story by Bram Stoker, the author of the 1897 novel Dracula, first published in Dublin's Daily Express. It was unknown to Stoker scholars until its rediscovery in 2016. The story concerns an unnamed man who meets three mysterious children (two Indian girls and a fair-haired boy) while visiting Gibbet Hill in Surrey, England, the site of a real-world murder of a sailor by three others.

The Stoker scholar John Edgar Browning identifies the story as "a fertile training ground of sorts for myriad elements from Dracula's genesis". It contains themes repeated in Dracula, such as dreamlike states, observant travelling narrators, and real-world locations. It also contains themes in common with Stoker's wider work, such as snake-like creatures. Browning states that the story contains the clearest allusions to British Imperialism in colonial India in Stoker's fiction. The children, Browning argues, evoke an orientalist vision of the Thuggee of India, reflecting anxieties about threats to British power in India. Both "Gibbet Hill" and Dracula evoke fears of foreign Others colonizing Britain.

== Plot ==
The story is narrated by a man who meets three children – two Indian girls and a white-skinned boy – standing in front of a memorial to a murdered sailor by Gibbet Hill. One of the children suggests that, if there was a murder today, someone would be stuck up on Gibbet Hill. The man invites them to see where the murderer would be put and, together, they walk to the top of the hill. The boy shows the narrator worms he has collected, stretching one of them, but refuses to release them when the narrator asks. At the top of the hill is a popular picnic spot, and the narrator sees others, including a man and woman he calls "the honeymoon couple".

Distracted by the view, the narrator loses sight of the children. He falls asleep, and when he wakes can hear mysterious music. He sees the children in a copse; they play instruments the narrator cannot identify, chant, and dance. A blindworm (which the narrator incorrectly calls a snake and incorrectly describes as hissing) passes over his feet towards the children, then climbs into the boy's hand. The "snake" freezes, and the children pull it taut; the narrator is reminded of a person in a cataleptic fit. The girls speak in a language the narrator does not understand, but he surmises that they are asking the "snake" questions, and it spins back and forth in response. He believes one of the girls is negative, and the other positive. After a climax to the ritual in which one of the girls' faces is flushed with "unholy" anger, the "snake" drops dead from the boy, and he awakes as if from a trance. The three run away into the woods.

The narrator walks around the area, and enjoys the solitude when he returns to a deserted hilltop as night falls. He is grabbed from behind by strong hands and bound, but is surprised to find that his attackers are not thieves, but the three children. The girl who had displayed anger draws a knife and torments the bound narrator, showing great skill, but not injuring him. The narrator feels deeply chilled and falls unconscious as the children laugh. He is awoken by "the honeymoon couple", George and Bella, who are worried for his health in the cold night. George confirms to the narrator that they saw the three children hours ago, and thought them "the prettiest and happiest children we had ever seen". The narrator feels cold in his heart. George starts, alarming Bella, as a "snake" emerges from the narrator's abdomen, heading to the copse.

== Publication and discovery ==
"Gibbet Hill" was first published in an 1890 Christmas supplement of the Daily Express Dublin Edition. However, it fell into obscurity, and was unknown to even Stoker biographers and literary scholars until 2016, when it was discovered by the Stoker scholar Paul S. McAlduff, who approached John Edgar Browning. The pair began a project to anthologize unknown Stoker works. "Gibbet Hill" was then separately co-discovered in 2023 by Brian Cleary, an amateur researcher and Stoker enthusiast at the National Library of Ireland.

In 2024, The Rotunda Foundation published "Gibbet Hill" in a book with a foreword from Roddy Doyle, two pieces from Cleary, a discussion from the Stoker biographer Paul Murray, artwork from Paul McKinley, and an essay on "the education of the deaf and dumb of Ireland" by Charlotte M. B. Stoker. Proceeds from the book went to the Charlotte Stoker Fund to support research into deafness in children.

Subsequently, in 2025, McAlduff and Browning published "Gibbet Hill", along with 18 other "previously unknown or relatively unglimpsed published letters, works of short fiction, and journalistic writing by Bram Stoker [and] fifty-five other unknown period writings", as Bram Stoker's Gibbet Hill and Other Lost Writings: An Anthology. This was part of Palgrave Macmillan's series Palgrave Gothic.

== Inspiration ==
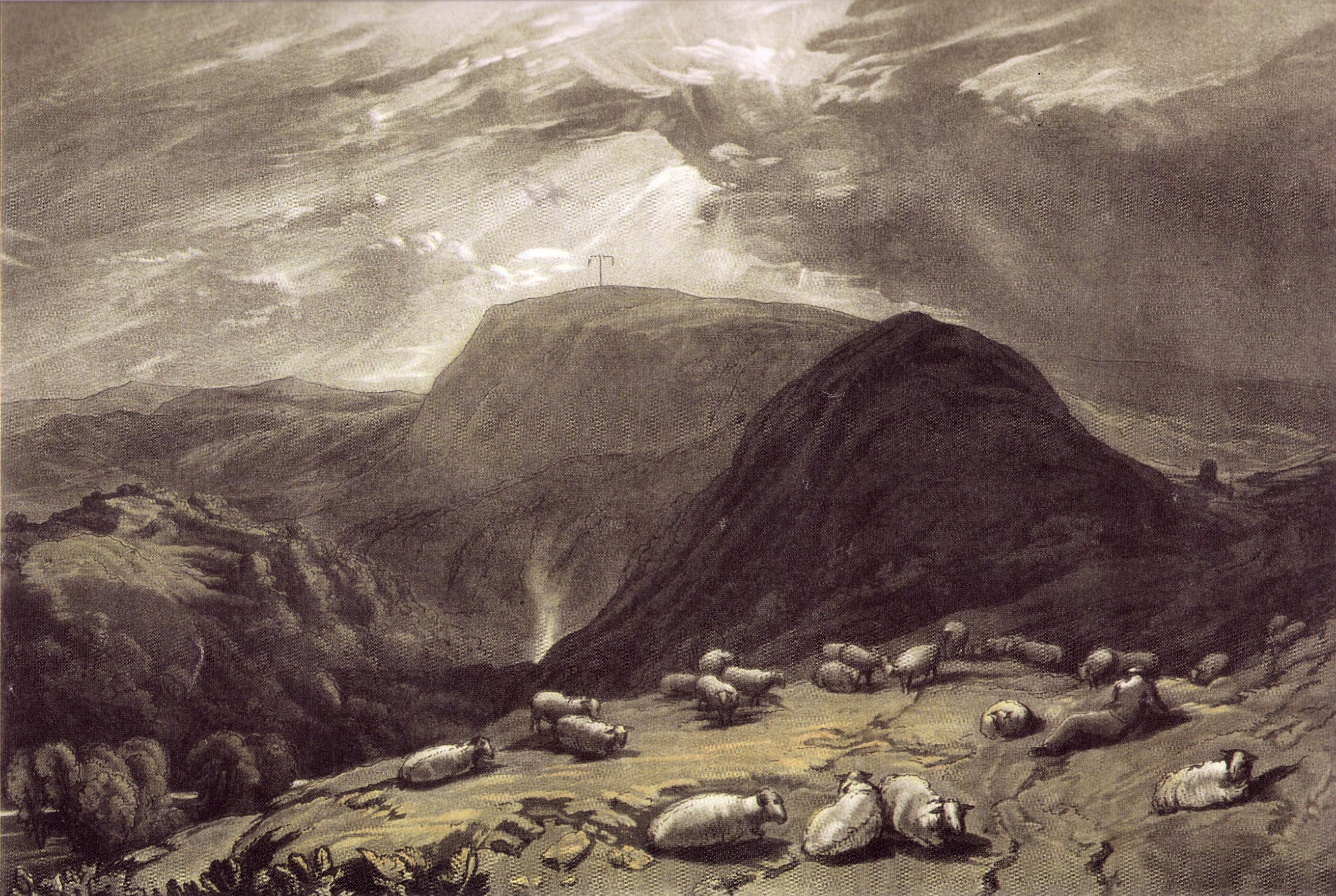
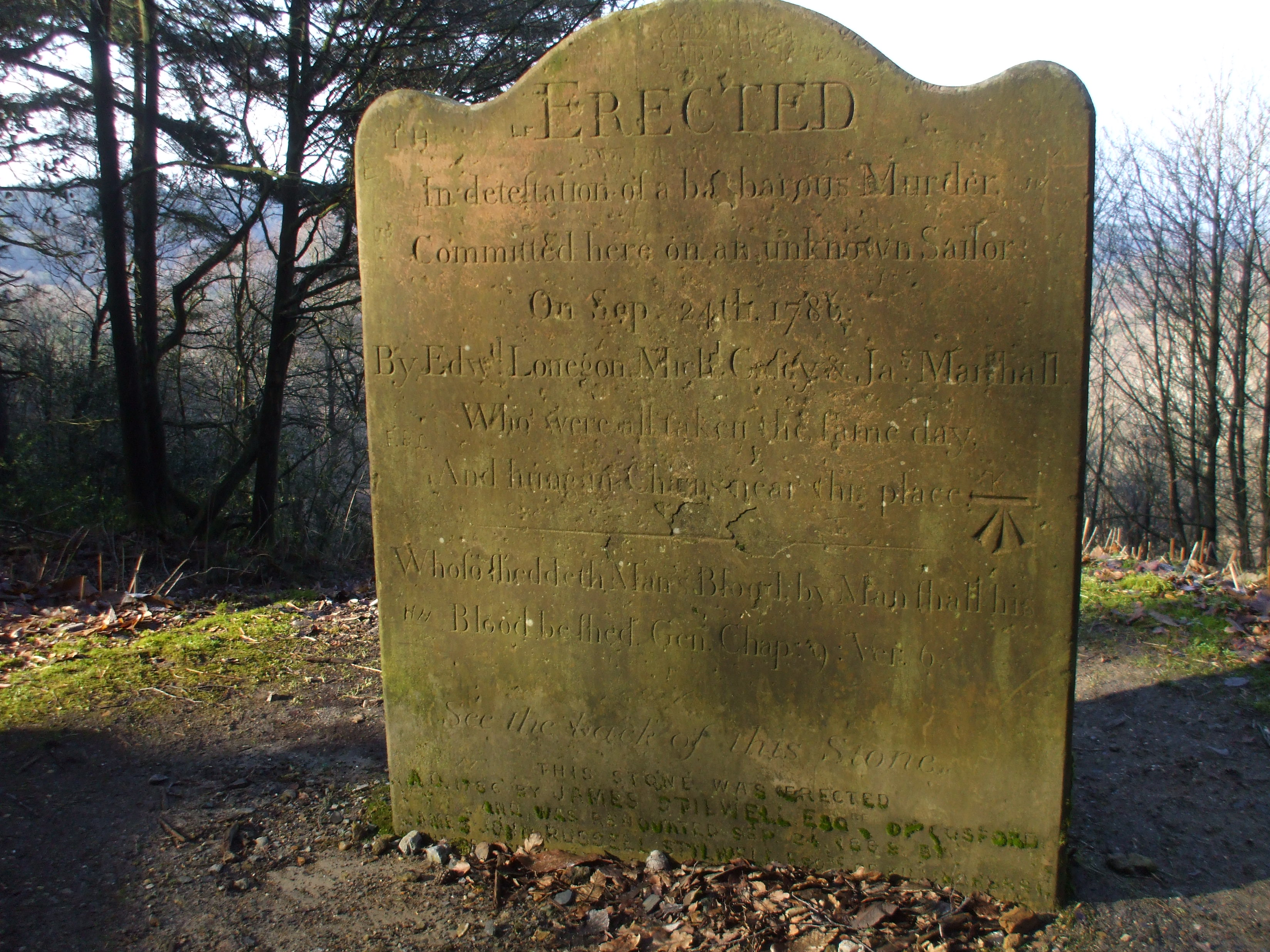
J. M. W. Turner's depiction of the Gibbet Hill from the Liber Studiorum, and the "Sailor Stone" near the hill, both mentioned at the beginning of the story.

"Gibbet Hill" was published the same year as The Snake's Pass after Stoker had begun to compile notes for Dracula. While there is no documentary evidence showing how long Stoker spent writing "Gibbet Hill" or when he wrote it, it was presumably while he was staying in London, after he had left Dublin in 1878.

Stoker draws from the real-life story of three sailors who killed a fourth near Gibbet Hill in 1786. The murderers beheaded their victim, then stripped and abandoned his body. The killers were executed six months later, and then gibbetted at the edge of the Devil's Punch Bowl, with the Unknown Sailor buried in Thursley. A "Sailor Stone" was erected at Gibbet Hill, and this is where the narrator meets the children in the story. William Erle arranged for a Celtic cross at the site of the gibbet in 1851 to combat superstition about the area. This cross features in "Gibbet Hill", as it is where the narrator is attacked.

Stoker's interest in India, on display in the story, may have been inspired by his brother Thomas, who served in the Indian Civil Service.

== Scholarly analysis ==
"Gibbet Hill" is a gothic horror story that blends orientalist supernatural themes with realism. Even the title, referring to a gibbet, has clear horror overtones. The plot is apparently simple, with the narrator mirroring Stoker himself. However, the literary theorist Nina Anna Trzaska describes the plot as "enigmatic and unclear" (enigmatyczna i niejasna), while Browning says that "much lies beneath this story's surface that we are only just beginning to unpack".

=== India ===
"Gibbet Hill", Browning argues, offers the clearest allusions in Stoker's work of British imperialism in India. Stoker's fiction regularly includes "exotic" or "oriental" figures visiting the British Isles. This was fairly common in writing of the time, as were comparisons between Irish people and Indian people, especially the Thuggee, to whom Stoker makes allusions in "Gibbet Hill".

The children of "Gibbet Hill" show analogies to an orientalist image of the Thuggee, including the European boy dressed in exotic clothing (a possible "initiate"); allusions to belts, associated with Thuggee strangulation; the way the children join the narrator after gaining his trust; the ritual; and the robbery. Stoker would have known of fictionalized accounts of the Thuggee, including female Thuggee, such as "Uncle Jeremy's Household", by Stoker's friend Arthur Conan Doyle, who had a cottage not far from Gibbet Hill. The story thus potentially reflects a fear of "Thug infiltration" into the colonial government of India or even Britain.

Both Stoker's and Doyle's allusions to Thuggee present a fear of British failure to dominate and acculturate India (and thus a fear of being dominated in return). Meanwhile, Stoker, in contrast to some earlier writers, sees the Thuggee as a religious, and not merely criminal, group. Ultimately, the mesmerism and unfamiliar knowledge of the children of "Gibbet Hill" would "have served not only to exoticize further what was otherwise a rudimentary activity like highway crime, but reconceptualize the Thuggee as a religious threat capable of acculturating Britons like the story's ten-year-old Caucasian".

=== Connections to Stoker's other work ===
Browning describes "Gibbet Hill" as "a fertile training ground of sorts for myriad elements from Dracula's genesis". This includes the use of dreamlike states, female "charmers", an observant travelling narrator, real-world locations, and evident xenophobia. The novel contains a range of themes familiar from Stoker's wider work. In particular, "Gibbet Hill" illustrates Stoker's fascination with snakes and snake-like creatures, which is also visible in his The Snake's Pass, The Lair of the White Worm, and Under the Sunset. Further, though the boy tormenting worms resembles the Dracula character Renfield, who also torments small animals, this is a motif repeatedly visible in Stoker's writing.

Trzaska connects the image of the Indian girls in "Gibbet Hill" as dangerous Others to readings of Dracula as evoking "reverse colonization". For Browning, the Caucasian boy in "Gibbet Hill" is potentially analogous to the British people who could become vampires in Dracula. While Dracula (Browning notes, drawing on the analysis of Jill Galvan) presents a mesmeric foreign rapist, the narrator in "Gibbet Hill" finds himself in a similar place to Dracula's would-be targets: "he is, in effect, feminized in that he is bound, symbolically raped, and overpowered by mesmeric power". Browning places both Dracula and "Gibbet Hill" in the "Imperial Gothic canon", highlighting that both works evoke fears about India's ability to challenge British imperialism.
