= The Chain of Destiny =

- The Chain of Destiny was first published in The Shamrock on Saturday, 1 May 1875
- Author: Bram Stoker
- Language: English
- Genre: Horror, Mystery
- Published in: The Shamrock, 1 May, 1875, Shades of Dracula (1982)
- Publisher: Irish National Newspaper and Publishing Co., Dublin
- Publication date: 1 May 1875
- Publication place: Ireland
- Media type: Print
- Text: The Chain of Destiny at Wikisource

The Chain of Destiny is an 1875 Gothic horror novella by Irish author Bram Stoker published in four installments of The Shamrock.

It is one of Bram Stoker's earliest horror stories, incorporating classic Gothic tropes and elements such as a haunted house, an ancient family curse, prophetic nightmares, supernatural occurrences, and doomed love.

After learning of a centuries-old family curse on the Fothering family, Frank Stanford has terrifying premonitions of a supernatural demonic force threatening his fiancée Diana, who resembles a painting in his room.

== Background ==
It explores dominant Victorian-era themes such as fate, coincidence, predetermination, the supernatural, and destiny. It focuses on the romance between the two main characters, Frank Stanford and Diana Fothering, within the setting of a Gothic horror landscape of apparitions and prophecies of doom.

The story is set in the Scarp estate in Ireland, a white stone edifice of "great age". It is a house that would have "delighted" Washington Irving and Nathaniel Hawthorne.

It followed his first novel The Primrose Path and the adventure story "Buried Treasures" which were also published in 1875 in The Shamrock. His first short story had been published in September, 1872 in London Society, the macabre tale "The Crystal Cup".

The story is about a man who falls in love with a woman named Miss Diana Fothering. The romance is threatened by a dark and mysterious curse of the Fothering family and a hallucinatory premonition he experiences upon arriving at their house.

While the story opens with classic haunted house and supernatural imagery and motifs, the basis for the curse is revealed and explained midway through the story. The third chapter focuses on Frank's anxiety that the curse will be fulfilled and Diana will be the victim. The remainder of the novella shifts the focus to the emotional character development and romantic attachments and entanglements of the two main characters.

== Characters ==
- "Master" Frank Stanford --- a young visitor
- Diana Fothering --- a visitor to the estate
- Miss Fothering --- her younger sister
- Mr. Charles Trevor --- the owner of the Scarp estate
- Mrs. Trevor --- his wife
- Parks --- the family servant

== Plot summary ==
The work is divided into four chapters: Chapter I: A Warning, Chapter II: More Links, Chapter III: The Third To-morrow, and Chapter IV: Afterwards. The work is a novella or short novel.

Chapter I: A Warning

Frank arrives at the Scarp estate in Ireland for a pleasant visit with his old friends, Mr. and Mrs. Trevor. During his stay, Mrs. Trevor acts as a matchmaker, telling Frank he is destined to fall in love with a young woman named Miss Diana Fothering, "Miss Fothering". She will visit along with her younger sister, referred to as the "Miss Fotherings". Frank had lost his mother at a young age. Mrs. Trevor had functioned as his surrogate mother, especially when he was ill at college and she nursed him back to health.

Before Diana arrives, however, Frank notices a painting in his bedroom that has been the source of terrifying nightmares since he moved into the room.

Frank experiences a terrifying nightmare: The portrait in his room appears to come to life and a girl in the adjacent bed screams out in terror and seems to die. He saw three smiling children floating in the air looking in at the girl through the window. There was "by their side something dark and shadowy". Then their expressions changed and they became old, "decrepit and deformed", appearing like malignant witches. The "dark mass" near them also changed from a "cloud" to a "shadow with a form".

Frank noted that the picture reminded him of Shakespeare's Beatrice in Much Ado About Nothing and Beatrice Cenci.

A demonic voice intones "To-morrow, and to-morrow, and to-morrow. The fairest and the best." Frank sees a horrific image before him: "There stood before me the phantom of the Fiend."

Chapter 2: More Links

Frank asks the servant Parks if he is aware of any legends regarding the house and the family. Parks tells him that an old woman in the village had heard "awful stories" and tales of "times of horror". But no credence was given to them.

At breakfast, Frank is asked by Mrs. Trevor to look at the painting in the room again and to describe it to her. She tells him that it may have been painted for Diana Fothering. She tells him he will like her when he meets her. He tells her he likes the features of the person in the painting very much.

He recalls that apparition he saw in his dream that night and of "the phantoms out in the night".

Frank heard about a dark ancient curse afflicting the Fothering family. Upon being told he will soon meet Diana, Frank experiences a waking vision or dreadful nightmare involving an evil entity that promises doom for the young woman.

Frank and Mrs. Trevor are determined and resolute in resolving and explaining the ancient curse and then begin to unravel the mystery linking Diana, her family history, and the painting.

They resolve to find the secret of the curse by examining the genealogy of the family. They go to the library where they find a book, "The Book of Kirk". It shows that the Kirk and Fothering family connection goes back to 1573 and is the basis for the curse.

A Kirk daughter had married a brother of Fothering against the wishes of her father and brother. The Kirk brother then killed the daughter's husband in a duel. Fothering swore an oath to avenge him. The curse was aimed at cutting off the hand of the murderer and nailing it above the Fothering doorway. Kirk, in turn, cast his own curse. He prayed for the complete destruction of the first Fothering to enter Scarp who was "the fairest and best". Then cut off his own right hand and threw it in a fire to burn and fell on his own sword and died.

They then examined the painting again and turned it over. They found that it was a painting of Margaret Kirk, 1572. She was the Kirk daughter who married against her father's wishes. She bore a resemblance to Diana.

Frank did not tell her of his dream. They were satisfied that they had traced the origin of the curse.

Frank slept well that night.

Chapter III: The Third To-morrow

Frank had been reading Percy Bysshe Shelley's poem "Stanzas Written in Dejection" when Mrs. Trevor ran into him and told him she wanted to introduce him to Di.

Frank and Diana meet. She is told of their discovery of the origin of the curse. Frank is still anxious about his dream but does not tell her about it. She tells him she does not believe in ghosts or the supernatural. He learns that he had met her as a child.

As children, Diana had saved Frank from drowning, an incident he forgot due to the subsequent grief and illness following his mother's death. Diana also dimly recalls the rescue.

When Miss Fothering arrives, Frank noticed that she has the exact likeness of the girl in the portrait and his dream

The portrait at Scarp depicted a young girl that looked like Diana because the house had once belonged to her family, the Fotherings.

Despite the ominous vision of her death, Frank and Diana quickly develop a deep mutual affection and become engaged.

He has a foreboding of evil, however, and reveals the details of his dream. He sees the old room where he had his dream and is himself filled with a premonition of death. He tries to convince her of the danger she is in but she remains highly skeptical.

He gives her a handkerchief as a token which he blesses, convincing her that a Christian blessing will ward off evil. He is filled with dread and panic.

He finally breaks into her room, shattering the glass.

Chapter IV: Afterwards

Frank wakes up in a room by himself. Mrs. Trevor is nursing him back to health, once again acting as a surrogate mother to him.

He discovers that it was folly to have believed in his dream, to have passively succumbed to his delusions. He slowly recuperates. He is visited by Diana with whom he re-established his relationship. They grow closer together. They finally decide to marry.

The narrative focuses on the psychological impact of the visions, blending Gothic horror with Victorian romance. The emphasis then changes to Frank’s emotional anxieties and his recovery from the resulting nervous strain as he embarks on sustaining his uncertain relationship with Diana.

The story implies that their meeting was destined or predetermined. All the events that occurred to them make up "the chain of destiny" that led to the current moment in time. Though no one could see them, the events in their lives were all part of their destiny.

They finally acknowledge their past encounters in their youth. The sequence of events or "the chain of destiny" proves to be a blessing rather than a curse.

== Publication history ==
It was first published in 1875 as a serial in The Shamrock, a Dublin literary weekly newspaper. The story appeared in four issues of The Shamrock with the first installation appearing on May 1, 1875 and the last on May 22, 1875.

The Chain of Destiny was first collected in 1982 in the short story anthology Shades of Dracula and in 1997 in Best Ghost and Horror Stories.

== Reception ==
Richard Dalby in Best Ghost and Horror Stories wrote that this story "established Stoker's favorite themes of curses and villains, set in a spooky gothic house, where an eerie portrait appears and disappears. A character known as 'the phantom of the fiend' is the first of Stoker's truly gothic pre-Dracula figures."

Carol A. Senf, in Bram Stoker, wrote that he used Gothic tropes merely as scenery: "The Chain of Destiny, the last work Stoker published while still in Dublin (he published The Duties of Clerks of Petty Sessions in Ireland after moving to London), reveals him perfecting his craft but not yet using Gothic elements for more than creepy atmosphere." They were not integrated into the themes of the story other than superficially: "He certainly does not weave them into sustained social commentary."

== Sources ==
- Hughes, William. Beyond Dracula: Bram Stoker’s Fiction and Its Cultural Context. Springer, 2000.
- Senf, Carol A., ed. The Critical Introduction to Bram Stoker. Westport, Conn.: Greenwood Press, 1993.
- Senf, Carol A. Bram Stoker. Gothic Authors: Critical Revisions. Cardiff: University of Wales Press, 2010.
- Shepherd, Mike. When Brave Men Shudder: The Scottish Origins of Dracula. Newcastle upon Tyne, UK: Wild Wolf Publishing, 2018.
- Stoker, Bram. Shades of Dracula: The Uncollected Short Stories of Bram Stoker. Edited by Peter Haining. London: William Kimber, 1982.
- Stoker, Bram. Best Ghost and Horror Stories. Edited and with an Introduction by Richard Danby. New York: Dover Publications, Inc., 1997.
