= Shadow Builder =

- Poster for Shadow Builder
- Directed by: Jamie Dixon
- Written by: Bram Stoker (story); Michael Stokes
- Produced by: Daniel Chuba; Ash R. Shah
- Starring: Michael Rooker; Leslie Hope; Shawn Thompson; Tony Todd
- Cinematography: David Pelletier
- Edited by: Craig Nisker
- Music by: Eckart Seeber
- Production companies: Imperial Entertainment; Hammerhead Productions
- Distributed by: Sterling Home Entertainment
- Release date: August 25, 1998
- Running time: 100:37 minutes
- Countries: Canada; United States
- Language: English

Shadow Builder is a 1998 direct-to-video horror film directed by Jamie Dixon. It is based on the short story "The Shadow Builder" by Bram Stoker from the 1881 short story collection Under the Sunset.

== Plot ==
An evil Archbishop and his followers summon a demon to destroy the world, but the demon's first act is to kill its summoners. It does so in an appropriately unique manner, by turning the bodies of its victims into what appears to be solid shadow, which disintegrates at the first touch of light, any light. Light is in fact the demon's anathema. Unable to stand the slightest glimmer at its creation, the creature gains strength and solidity with each kill, allowing it a greater resistance to the light; and with it the ability to affect and control those around it, including a pack of vicious dogs. As the town is orchestrated towards its own destruction, it proceeds to hunt down a particular child. A pivotal sacrifice, necessary to complete its transition into the light, and unleash its Evil.

== Cast ==
- Michael Rooker as Jacob Vassey
- Leslie Hope as Jennifer Hatcher
- Shawn Thompson as Sheriff Sam Logan
- Andrew Jackson as Shadowbuilder
- Kevin Zegers as Chris Hatcher
- Tony Todd as Evert Covey
- Catherine Bruhier as Maggie MacKinnon
- Charlotte Sullivan as Jazz
- David Calderisi as Bishop Gallo
- Paul Soles as Mr. Butterman
- Billie Mae Richards as Mrs. Butterman
- Nicole Stoffman as Kelly
- Steve Blum as Shadowbuilder (voice)

== Production ==
Shadow Builder was written by Michael Stokes and based on "The Shadow Builder" by Bram Stoker from Under the Sunset (1881). Ash Shah's Imperial Entertainment contacted visual effects firm Hammerhead Productions about collaborating on the film together where Hammerhead would be made partner in exchange for reduced rate on the visual effects, director and Hammerhead co-founder Jamie Dixon agreed to. In order to acquire foreign presales on Shadow Builder, Shah had Hammerhead Productions produce a teaser. Dixon and Thad Beier of Hammerhead shot and produced a 90 second teaser over the course of 10 days at a cost of $25,000. When the teaser was shown at the American Film Market, the producers had managed to cover the cost of production as well as generate a profit before the film was even released. Michael Rooker was cast as the film's lead due to his recognition factor in foreign markets after having appeared in large scale films such as Cliffhanger. Andrew Jackson was hired to play the titular Shadowbuilder after impressing Dixon with an improvised demonic performance. Upon completion of the film, producers Ash Shah and Dan Chuba expressed satisfaction with Dixon's cut with the exception of the ultimately reveal of the Shadowbuilder's appearance which was a prosthetic mask. In order to make the Shadowbuilder's appearance more satisfying, Dixon and Beier modified one of their effects programs to give the Shadowbuilder's face a more dynamic look that wouldn't have been possible with conventional make-up.

== Release ==
Shadow Builder was shown at the Fantasy Filmfest in Germany in August 1997. Following its run on the festival circuit, the film was released on home video in the United States on August 25, 1998.

== Reception ==
TV Guide noted in its positive review that "While the basic premise and a few details of Shadow Builder are familiar, the movie has been put together with commendable skill."
