= Chin Music =

Chin music is a slang term with several meanings.

"Chin Music" may also refer to:

== Music ==
- Chin Music, a 1993 cassette by Buck 65 (performing as Stinkin' Rich)
- "Chin Music", a song on the 2009 album Travels with Myself and Another by Future of the Left
- "Chin Music", a song on the 2011 album Volume 2: High and Inside by The Baseball Project
- "Chin Music", an instrumental track on the 2013 album Sticky Wickets by Irish cricket-pop band The Duckworth Lewis Method

== Publishing ==
- Chin Music Press, a Japanese/American book publishing company
- Chin Music, a children's novel about baseball by Canadian author Gregory David Roberts
- "Chin Music", a short story by Bram Stoker from his collection Snowbound: The Record of a Theatrical Touring Party

== Other ==
- Superkick, a wrestling finishing attack referred to by wrestler Shawn Michaels as the "Sweet Chin Music"
