= Constable & Robinson =

Imprint of Little, Brown which publishes fiction

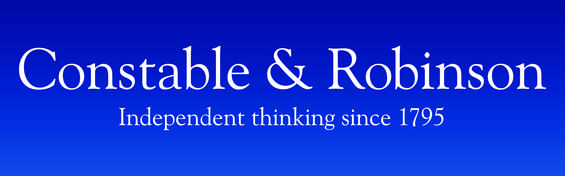
- Parent company: Little, Brown Book Group
- Founded: 1999 (Constable & Co. founded 1795, Robinson Publishing Ltd founded 1983)
- Founder: Archibald Constable and Nick Robinson
- Country of origin: United Kingdom
- Headquarters location: Russell Square, London
- Publication types: Books
- Imprints: Constable, Robinson, C&R Crime, Right Way, Corsair, Canvas, Much-in-Little
- Official website: constablerobinson.com

Constable & Robinson Ltd. is a British book publisher. It serves as an imprint of Little, Brown, under Hachette Livre and publishes fiction and non-fiction books in physical and ebook format. Constable & Robinson also publishes a non-fiction list including current affairs, history and biography, humour and psychology, as well as crime fiction, and literary fiction in both hardback and paperback. Best known are the longstanding Mammoth paperback list of anthologies and collections, self-help and practical titles such as Right Way, and the history series of Brief Guides and Brief Histories. The company also publishes the Agatha Raisin series in the UK.

== History ==
Constable & Co. was founded in 1795 in Edinburgh, Scotland by Archibald Constable, and became the publisher of works by prominent authors such as Sir Walter Scott, Henry James, Elizabeth Bowen, George Bernard Shaw and Bram Stoker. Constable rose to prominence with Sir Walter Scott's work, as the authors works became hugely popular in the Victorian era, including the poem Marmion. From 1895 to 1897 Bram Stoker published three books with the company (The Watter's Mou', The Shoulder of Shasta, Dracula).

In 1827, following the death of his father, Thomas Constable took over the company. In 1860, Thomas Constable sold the publishing part of his business to Edmonston & Douglas, while continuing the printing activities of his firm. In 1861, the company employed 50 compositors for printing work. In 1865, Thomas' son Archibald joined the firm as a partner and the firm began publishing as T. & A. Constable Ltd.

Ralph Arnold joined the firm in 1936, rising to chairman between 1958 and 1961. In his memoir Orange Street and Brickhole Lane (1963) he described the firm as having "a strangely endearing persona".

Robinson Publishing Ltd was founded in 1983 by Nick Robinson. Robinson Publishing focused on accessible non-fiction and related genre titles. The two companies merged in December 1999. Robinson led the company as chairman (he died in 2013).

In June 2007, Elliot Right Way Books, a successful small publisher of "how-to" titles and the publisher of compendia of speeches by Enoch Powell, was acquired by Constable & Robinson Ltd. The Right Way books focused on self-improvement and other general reference and practical advice titles on topics such as business and personal development.

A new fiction imprint, Corsair, was launched in October 2009 dedicated to publishing ground-breaking debut fiction alongside established authors. Upon its success, the company launched the Canvas imprint in December 2011 to focus on commercial fiction. A bijou imprint of Corsair, Much-in-Little, was launched in April 2012 focusing on quirky and imaginative new children's and YA fiction.

In 2013, Constable & Robinson created controversy when it responded to a manuscript submission by J. K. Rowling by suggesting that she attend a writing course. The novel, The Cuckoo's Calling, was published by a competitor, reprinted three times, and was adapted for television.

In 2014, Constable & Robinson was purchased by the Little, Brown Book Group. Approximately half of the original staff left the company after it was acquired.

In 2025, the company contracted M. W. Craven to author three crime novels.

== Awards ==
In 2011, A Visit from the Goon Squad by Jennifer Egan, published under the Corsair imprint in the UK, won the Pulitzer Prize for Fiction. In 2012, Constable & Robinson was named the IPG Independent Publisher of the Year, calling it "a publisher on a roll — a rising star in a difficult market". The same year, the company was also named Independent Publisher of the Year at The Bookseller Industry Awards. Constable & Robinson also won the IPG Trade Publisher of the Year award in 2013.

== See also ==
- Thomas Constable (printer and publisher)
