= The Shoulder of Shasta =

1895 novel by Bram Stoker

- First edition
- Author: Bram Stoker
- Language: English
- Genre: Romance
- Publisher: Constable
- Publication date: 1895
- Publication place: UK
- Media type: Print (Hardcover)
- Pages: 235

The Shoulder of Shasta is a romance novel by Bram Stoker written and published by Archibald Constable and Company in Westminster in 1895. The book is set in the American West, in northern California. It was written after one of the American tours he did with Henry Irving.

In 2000, the novel was republished by Desert Island Books in an edition introduced and annotated by Alan Johnson.

== Plot ==
The novel is a romance about a woman from San Francisco who travels to the northern California mountains, specifically the Mount Shasta region, and falls in love with a mountaineer. It follows Esse Elstree, a refined young city woman who falls in love with a local, rugged bear-hunter, Grizzly Dick. It is an adventure tale which differs from Stoker's other Gothic horror works, focusing on romance and the California scenery.

The tension or dramatic tension in the story stems from the cultural differences between the city dweller Esse and the rugged and ragged frontiersman Grizzly Dick. Their relationship is strengthened when Esse is menaced by a grizzly bear and Dick intervenes to extricate her from the danger. Stoker focuses on Grizzly Dick's attempts to adapt to genteel and civilized society.

It highlights the contrast between urban and rustic or rural lifestyles. The novel focuses on romance, adventure, and the excitement and attraction of the scenic American West. Having traveled in the U.S., Stoker was fascinated by the American West and the people who inhabited it.

== Main characters ==
- Esse Elstree: The protagonist and daughter of Mrs. Elstree, who moved Esse from San Francisco to Shasta due to her poor health. While on Shasta, she meets Grizzly Dick, with whom she becomes infatuated after a grizzly bear encounter nearly kills him. At the end of the story, Esse becomes engaged to Reginald Hampton.
- Grizzly Dick: Esse's primary romantic interest. He is an American man who has made his home and living as a guide and hunter in rural wooded regions outside of San Francisco. He grew up in the "Great American Desert," as he called it, and is rough around the edges, laughing at absurd volumes that seem rude to the Elstrees whom he guides up Shasta. Despite this, he is very respectful and kind, especially to Mrs. Elstree and Esse.
- Mrs. Elstree: The widowed, affectionate, and protective mother of Esse. She has golden hair and beautiful blue eyes that exhibit her placidity. She struggles with Esse's entrance into womanhood and disproves of Esse's initial interest in Dick but supports her engagement to Reginald.
- Miss Gimp: Esse's governess before they travelled to Shasta. Now, since Esse is grown, she takes care of all of the domestic animals and is Mrs. Elstree’s companion on their trip to Shasta. During their stay in Shasta, Miss Gimp becomes convinced that Dick is in love with her.

== Publication history ==
The novel was published by Archibald Constable and Company in Westminster in 1895.

It was published in New York the same year by Macmillan.

The novel was republished in 2000 by Desert Island Books in an edition introduced and annotated by Alan Johnson, with a Bibliographical Note by Richard Dalby.
