= The Watter's Mou' =

1895 novel by Bram Stoker

- First edition
- Author: Bram Stoker
- Language: English, Scots
- Genre: Romance
- Publisher: Constable
- Publication date: 1895
- Publication place: United Kingdom
- Media type: Print (Hardcover)
- Pages: 165

The Watter's Mou (Scots: "the water's mouth") is a romance novel by Bram Stoker, first published in 1895 by A. Constable and Company in London. It was published in the U.S. the same year by D. Appleton and Company in New York.

It is the story of a woman who is in love with a man whose job it is to stop the smuggling by poor local fishermen, one of whom is her father.

The conflict is between duty and love. The resolution of the dilemma is through self-sacrifice.

== Background ==
The story is set in Cruden Bay, Aberdeenshire, in northeastern Scotland, UK. It features a foggy, ominous, and atmospheric setting in a poor fishing village on the coast located at the Watter's Mou' or Water's Mouth.

Stoker was familiar with the locale because he spent his summer vacations there with his family.

The themes of the novel are duty versus loyalty and self-sacrifice for others. Stoker would return to the self-sacrifice theme in the short story "Greater Love", published in 1914.

== Plot ==
The novel is about a young coast guard officer, William Barrow, referred to as "Sailor Willy", the chief boatman of the Scotch Preventive Service, whose role is to prevent local smuggling. The setting is a poor fishing village in Cruden Bay on the eastern coast of Scotland. William faces a dilemma when he discovers that the father of his fiancée, Maggie MacWhirter, is involved in the illicit smuggling operation along with her brothers Andrew, known as "Sandy", and Niel. She has to choose between protecting her father from exposure and arrest and allowing her intended husband to do his job in an ethical and legal way and enforce the laws.

The MacWhirter family faces financial ruin. They obtain a predatory loan from a moneylender, Soloman Mendoza. Unable to repay the loan, he forces them to make a precarious smuggling run at sea.

Tipped off, William prepares an ambush for the smugglers. Maggie pleads with him to overlook the operation but he refuses to do so. The climax is reached when she is forced to sail to reach the smuggler's boat, the Sea Gull, in a violent storm to warn her father that he faces arrest by the coast guard. She makes a perilous and treacherous sea voyage that leads to the destruction of the boat and her death. Her body washes up on the shore the next morning where it is found by William. After a search for her body, they find William and Maggie both drowned in the sea.

A major theme is duty versus love, which results in tragedy.

Self-sacrifice to attain redemption and salvation is another central theme. "Greater love hath no man, than this, that a man lay down his life for his friend." The passage from John 15:13 is quoted with the original "friends" changed to "friend". This is what motivates Maggie to risk her life in a futile attempt to reconcile her love for her father and brothers and that for her intended husband.

== Publication history ==
It was first published in the UK by A. Constable and Company in Westminster, as a part of the short lived Acme Library series as No. 2. on January 7, 1895.

It was first published in the U.S. in 1895 by D. Appleton and Company in New York.

A. Constable and Co. also released The Watter's Mou' in a one shilling paperback edition in the UK.

An abridged version of the novel was published in the U.S. as "At the Watter's Mou': Between Duty and Love" in the November, 1895 issue of Current Literature: A Magazine of Contemporary Record by the Current Literature Publishing Company in New York.

== Main characters ==
- William "Sailor Willy" Barrow - member of the coast guard
- Maggie MacWhirter - his fiancée
- Mr. MacWhirter - Maggie's father
- Andrew "Sandy" MacWhirter - Maggie's brother
- Niel MacWhirter - Maggie's brother
- Solomon Mendoza - a moneylender

== Online texts ==
- Bram Stoker Online Full text and PDF versions of The Watter's Mou'.
- The Watter's Mou'. Westminster: A. Constable & Co., 1895.
- The Watter's Mou'. 1895 U.S. edition. New York: Appleton.
