= The Man (Stoker novel) =

1905 novel by Bram Stoker

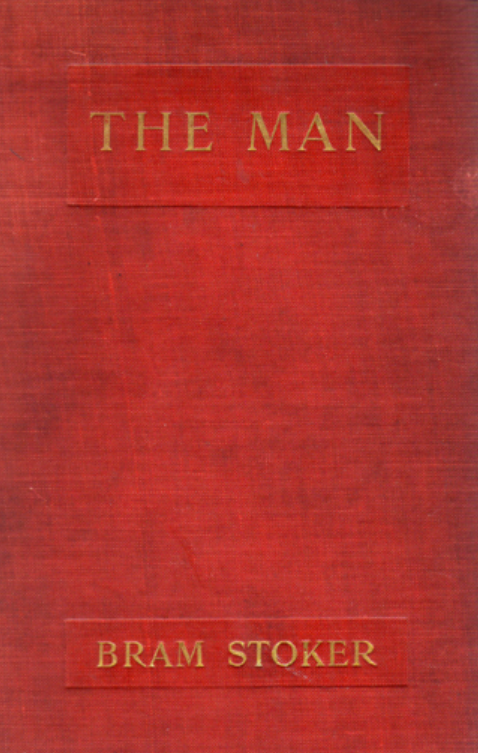
- 1905 first edition. Heinemann.
- Author: Bram Stoker
- Language: English
- Genre: Gothic horror, romance
- Publisher: Heinemann
- Publication date: 1905
- Publication place: United Kingdom
- Media type: Print (hardcover)

The Man is a 1905 Edwardian novel by Bram Stoker. A Gothic novel, it features both horror and romance. The Man has also been published as The Gates of Life. It was released eight years after Dracula.

The novel was published by Heinemann in London in 1905. It was also published by Heinemann as a part of their Heinemann's Colonial Library series (No. 319). An abridged version was published by Cupples and Leon in New York in 1908 as The Gates of Life. Robert Hayes republished an abridged version of the novel in the UK in the early 1920s.

The novel explores themes of gender roles and sexual identity. Stephen Norman, a woman, is brought up as a tomboy by her father after her mother dies. She enters a disastrous marriage and is estranged from her friend Harold. After being apart, a shipwreck, blindness, and a rescue result in their reunion. The novel reveals Victorian social conventions and mores through their romance.

== Historical context ==
The Victorian Era, the reign of Queen Victoria from her coronation on 20 June 1837 to her death on 22 January 1901, is known as a long period of peace, prosperity and national pride for the British Empire. It was a bold transition from the Georgian era, largely defined by logic, rationalism and a progression towards romanticism and mysticism in religion, societal values and the arts. In international relations, the Georgian era was widely regarded as a period of peace and Britain involved themselves in little external conflict. However, within the American colonies there was much unrest. In British domestic relations, the political agenda became increasingly liberal and was marked by shifts toward political, industrial and social reform. During the Victorian era, Britain experienced an unprecedented economic and population growth.

The end of the era, when The Man was written, coincided with Europe's Belle Époque. Like Britain's Victorian era, the period was characterized by optimism, peace, advances in technology and scientific discoveries.

== Literary background ==
During the Romantic period of literature, which immediately preceded the Victorian period, poetry was the most popular form of literature. In the Victorian period, the novel became the predominant literary work. The most important novelist of the Victorian era is Charles Dickens. Other notable authors include the Brontë sisters: Anne, Charlotte, and Emily (who published works under male pseudonyms), George Eliot (pseudonym of Mary Ann Evans), Thomas Hardy, Lewis Carroll, George Gissing and Arthur Conan Doyle.

During the late 19th and early 20th centuries, the subgenre of Gothic fiction emerged from the broader genre of fantastic fiction. These stories, centering on larger-than-life characters, took place in castles, cemeteries and monasteries in rural England or Europe or in large cities (such as London). Gothic literature combined romance and horror.

== Plot ==
Squire Stephen Norman is lord of the manor in Normanstead. He marries Margaret Rowly, younger sister of his friend Rowly (squire of the neighbouring town). Desirous of an heir, Norman and Margaret have a baby girl and Margaret dies shortly after the birth. Norman promises her that he will love their daughter as much as he would have loved a son, and Margaret asks him to name the girl Stephen. Squire Norman raises his daughter Stephen as a tomboy. Margaret's spinster aunt Laetitia Rowly moves in to help care for Stephen, who is dominant, assertive and free-thinking.

When Stephen is six, Norman's visiting college friend Dr Wolf tells her about his 11-year-old son Harold. The girl asks Wolf to bring Harold on a future visit, and the children become friends. Two years later, Dr. Wolf dies of pneumonia and Squire Norman promises to raise Harold as if he were his own son. Stephen and Harold visit the graveyard of the Church of St. Stephen in Normanstead (where all her ancestors are buried), and find the crypt unlocked. Stephen and another young boy, Leonard Everard, explore the crypt. Harold finds Leonard running out of the crypt and Stephen unconscious on the floor in front of a coffin. Leonard tells her that he carried her out of the crypt, and she begins to admire him.

Harold goes to Cambridge University and begins to fall in love with Stephen, who admires Leonard (though he is selfish and uninterested in her). She tells her appalled aunt that a woman should be able to ask a man to marry her. After graduation, Harold moves back to Squire Norman's estate. He and Norman are involved in a phaeton accident, in which Norman is fatally injured. Before he dies, he tells Harold to look after Stephen and gives him his blessing to marry her if she wishes. Stephen decides to propose to Leonard, asking him in a letter to meet her. Leonard refuses her proposal, and she is humiliated. He tells an incredulous, upset Harold about Stephen's proposal, and Harold proposes to her the next morning. Stephen, aware that Harold knows about her rejected proposal, becomes angry and tells him to leave. When she tells Leonard that in exchange for his silence she will pay his debts, he realizes the advantages of marrying her. He proposes, and she rejects him.

Harold boards a ship bound for New York and assumes a new name, John Robinson. During the voyage, six-year-old Pearl Stonehouse is washed overboard. John saves her, and the grateful girl calls him "the Man". He refuses the Stonehouses' offer of a job, living in Alaska for two years before deciding to revisit the lonely Stephen (who has inherited a London mansion and a title, and whose sole confidante is an old woman known as the Silver Lady). During a storm, Stephen sees a ship ablaze in the distance; a bearded John is trying to swim to shore, and sees Stephen just before he is struck by lightning. Not recognizing him, Stephen has him rescued and brought to her home. A doctor discovers that John is blind, but believes that it is temporary. John, wanting to respect Stephen's wish that he stay out of her life, plans to escape.

Stephen hears from Alice Stonehouse, who learned about Mr. Robinson's accident and planned to visit him with her family. Alice explains to Stephen that the injured man had saved their daughter's life two years earlier, and Pearl had insisted on seeing "the Man". Pearl is confused by John's beard, but when the doctor removes his bandages she recognizes "the Man" and faints. Stephen, realizing that "the Man" is Harold, also faints and Harold suddenly regains his sight. Pearl tells Stephen that she should marry Harold, and Stephen consults the Silver Lady. The Silver Lady visits Harold, and tells him he should marry Stephen. Stephen and Harold find each other and embrace.

== Genre and style ==
The Man has elements of the Gothic fiction genre: horror and romance. The novel begins in a cemetery, and often returns there. Depictions of tombstones, Gothic architecture, gargoyles and other Gothic imagery are abundant. It focuses on a romance between the main character, Stephen, and Harold. It also focuses on the concept of death, with many characters dying in tragic accidents. Through the deaths, Stephen and Harold grow closer. The novel consists of a preface (or "fore-glimpse") followed by 37 short chapters, typically two to four pages.

== Themes ==
The New Woman was a popular character in 19th-century literature, carrying over into the 20th century. The New Woman, exemplified by Stephen, was typically a feminist, educated, independent career woman. Independent, she challenges the conventions of traditional 19th-century women. An example of her progressive, independent nature is when she breaks the tradition of the marriage proposal by proposing to Leonard.

Because Squire Norman raises Stephen with masculine qualities, she "very early in life manifested a dominant nature ... this was a secret pleasure to her father, who, never losing sight of his old idea that she was both son and daughter, took pleasure as well as pride of each manifestation of her imperial will". As a teenager, Stephen announces that she would "rather be a God than an angel", able to command the angels and make them submit to her. Harold, on the other hand, says that he would "rather be an angel than a God" because it is easier to accept the commands of a higher authority and carry them out.

== Critical reception ==
The novel was published in an abridged U.S. edition in 1908 and in an abridged UK edition in the 1920s by Robert Hayes. The novel saw extensive serial publication in the U.S. and Canada.

After it was published as a hardcover in the UK, The Man was reprinted as a daily or weekly serial in at least nine newspapers across the U.S. under the title The Gates of Life or Through the Gates of Life.

It appeared as follows:

- The Daily Picayune, New Orleans, Louisiana, May 1 - June 23, 1908
- The Montgomery Advertiser, Montgomery, Alabama, May 1 - June 30, 1908
- Poughkeepsie Daily Eagle, Poughkeepsie, New York, May 1 - June 30, 1908
- The Boston Herald, Boston, Massachusetts, May 3 - July 2, 1908 (illustrated)
- (The Evening Star, Washington D.C., May 3 - July 12, 1908 (weekly)
- The Journal and Tribune, Knoxville, Tennessee, May 4 - June 30, 1908
- The Illustrated Buffalo Express, Buffalo, New York, May 10 - June 28, 1908 (weekly)
- The Charleston Evening Post, Charleston, South Carolina, May 15 - June 30, 1908
- Baltimore American, Baltimore, Maryland, May 27 - July 10, 1908 (Published under the title Through the Gates of Life)
- Wilkes-Barre News, Wilkes-Barre, Pennsylvania, August 3, 1908 - September 24, 1908

The Man was also reprinted as a daily or twice weekly serial in at least three newspapers across Canada under the title The Gates of Life. It appeared as follows:

- The Morning Leader, Regina, Saskatchewan, May 6 - July 21, 1908
- The Vancouver World, Vancouver, BC, May 9 - June 27, 1908
- The World (Semi-Weekly Edition), Vancouver, BC, May 12 - June 30, 1908
- The Evening Journal, Ottawa, Ontario, May 19 - circa July 1908
