= The Snake's Pass =

1890 novel by Bram Stoker

The Snakes's Pass
- First UK edition
- Author: Bram Stoker
- Language: English
- Genre: Romance; Science fiction
- Publisher: Harper & Brothers (US) (1890); Sampson, Low, Marston, Searle & Rivingston (UK) (1891)
- Publication date: 1890
- Publication place: U.S., UK
- Media type: Print (hardcover)
- Pages: 365

The Snake's Pass is an 1890 novel by Bram Stoker published by Harper & Brothers in the U.S. and by Sampson, Low, Marston, Searle & Rivingston in the UK.

It centers on the legend of Saint Patrick defeating the King of the Snakes in Ireland, as well as on the troubled romance between the main character and a local peasant girl. The Snake's Pass was Stoker's second imperial fiction novel, and was first published in the United Kingdom in 1890.

== Publication ==
A year before the release of The Snake's Pass, Stoker published chapter three, "The Gombeen Man", as a short story in The People. It was later incorporated into the novel.

== Historical background ==
On 8 November 1847, Abraham (Bram) Stoker was born in Dublin, Ireland. His father worked as a civil servant and his mother was a charity worker and writer. During Stoker's childhood he spent many days in bed due to different illnesses. While he was bedridden, his mother told him horror stories which may have influenced his novels and writings.

In 1864 Stoker began school at the Trinity College, Dublin. During his time at the university, he worked part-time as a freelance journalist and drama critic. In 1878, Stoker met Henry Irving and they became friends. Two years later Stoker accepted a job to work as Irving's personal assistant in London.

Stoker's first book, The Duties of Clerks of Petty Sessions in Ireland, was written in Dublin and published in 1879. His first fictional book, Under the Sunset, was published in 1881. He wrote many other novels and short stories; however, he is best known for Dracula.

Stoker died of exhaustion at the age of 64 after writing a total of 18 books.

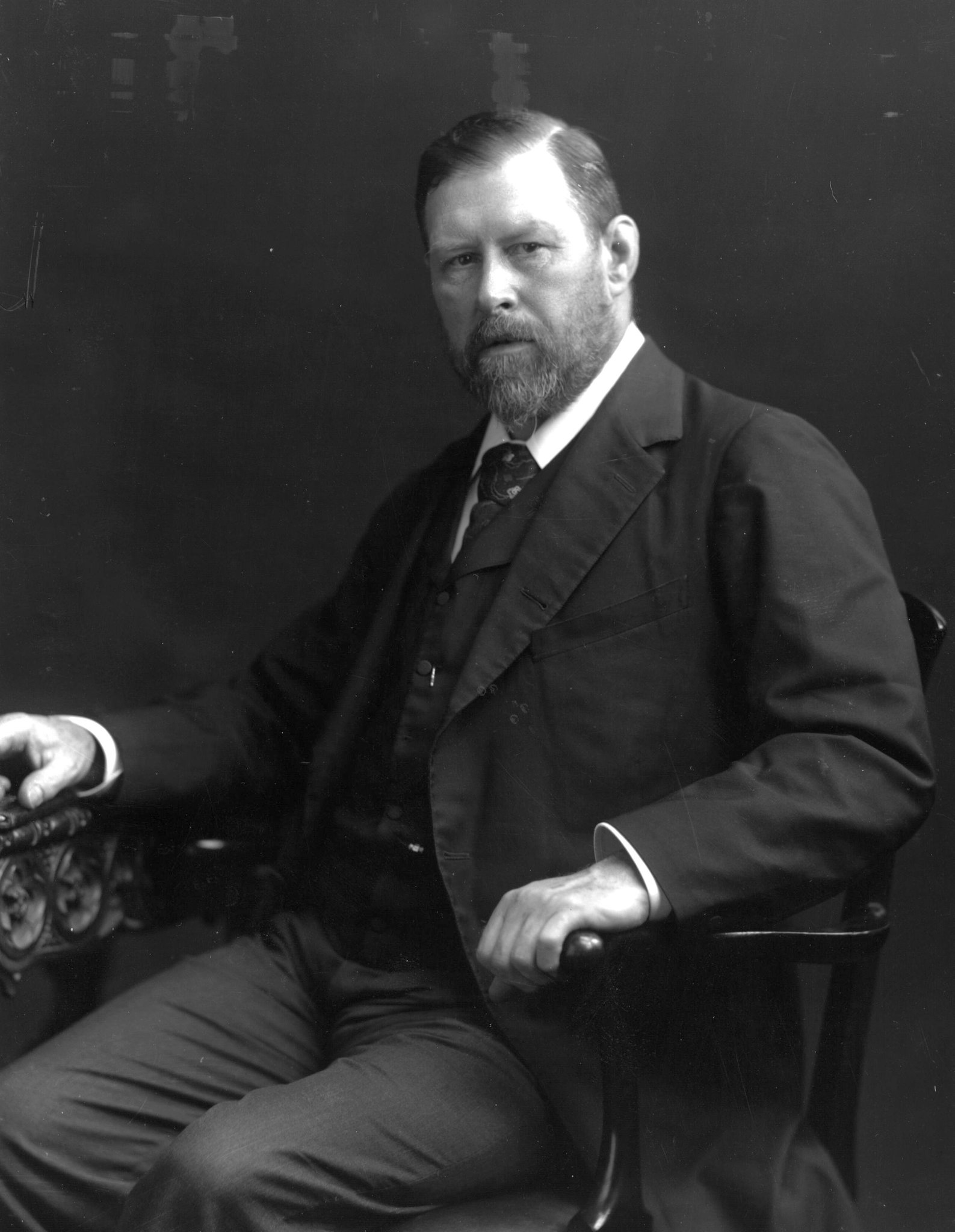

== Plot summary ==
The novel's protagonist, Arthur Severn, is traveling to the country of Clare to visit friends. He wants to improve his knowledge of Irish, so he makes a detour to the west of Ireland. While riding along with the driver, Andy, a severe storm begins. Andy suggests the two men stop traveling for the night and stay in the small town of Carnacliff. Andy takes them to a local bar where a man named Jerry Scanlan tells the legendary story of Shleenanaher.

The story begins with Saint Patrick, who drove all the snakes out of Ireland. However, the King of Snakes would remain in the lake in Shleenanaher, and he would only leave if he did not have his crown; thus, he hid it in the mountains. The King then tells Saint Patrick that he will come in another form so that he can watch his crown closely. The impending fog that occasionally sweeps over the town, along with a nearby swamp or bog, is said to be the form the King has decided to come back in to watch his crown. After Jerry finishes his story, an old, drunk man named Mr. Moynahan speaks up about the hidden treasure that is somewhere in the hills. Arthur learns that Moynahan's father was present in the altercation of the Frenchmen hiding the treasure.

The townspeople in the bar begin to tell Arthur about the town's evil villain, Black Murdock. They describe him as helpful when one is in need of money, but will curse them for the rest of their lives if they are unable to repay him. As the story is coming to a close, Murdock comes into the bar and asks for Phelim Joyce. Murdock announces to the bar that he has decided to keep Joyce's land because Joyce was late in repaying money he had loaned Joyce for his son's schooling. Joyce rushes into the bar, begging Murdock to let him pay. Joyce tells Murdock he has the money, but it was delayed because he fell into a hole on his way to the bar and injured his arm. Murdock refuses and tells Joyce that he will now own his land, and Joyce will now own the land Murdock used to own.

After Murdock has left, Arthur and Andy take Joyce home. It is very dark when they reach Joyce's house, and Arthur can hear the sweet sound of his daughter's voice helping him out of the carriage. Arthur is never able to see the face behind the sweet voice, but Andy tells him her name is Norah. Arthur decides that he would like to stay in the town for a few days and see this shifting bog in the morning. The next morning, the innkeeper asks Arthur if he will share a car up to the mountain with another man who is working there. The man turns out to be an old classmate of Arthur's, Dick Sutherland. Arthur, Dick, and Andy travel up to the hill to see the beautiful view and the bog. Dick explains that he was hired by Murdock as a scientist and geologist to help Murdock with some investigations on his land.

As the novel progresses, Dick, Arthur, and Andy advance in their work along the Knocknacar Hills when Arthur comes across what he describes as the most beautiful peasant girl he has ever seen. The two continue to meet in the same spot, but Arthur never learns her name. He describes her as "a beautiful peasant girl who had great gifts-a heart of gold, a sweet, pure nature, and a rare intelligence." One day, when Arthur goes to their meeting place, she doesn't show up. Every day, Arthur goes to their meeting spot but does not find the girl he does not know.

At dinner one evening, Dick tells Arthur of his love for Norah Joyce but fears her father will despise him because he is working on Murdock's land. Arthur tells Dick about his love for an unknown girl he has been unable to find. The next day, Andy finds Arthur waiting for his peasant girl and asks what Arthur desires in his future wife. When Arthur begins to describe her, he realizes he is describing his unknown girl. Andy tells Arthur that Norah would be the perfect fit for him, but Arthur cannot act upon this because Dick has feelings for her. They later learn she has gone to live in a convent.

The next day, Arthur decides to go to Murdock to try to buy his land so he can, in turn, give it to Dick to help him with Norah and Joyce. Murdock agrees, but only after he has finished his investigations, which he states will take him about a month. Arthur is excited to tell Dick that he bought Murdock's land, but as they talk, Dick warns that the bog is becoming more dangerous in Murdock's area because, if it shifts again, there is a deep reservoir right where his house is located. Arthur asks if he has told Murdock about this problem, and Dick says yes, last night. Arthur decides not to tell Dick of his purchase. After Arthur has his documents in order to purchase the land, he climbs the hill to see its beauty. He unexpectedly finds his unknown woman. Both are joyful and relieved to finally see each other again, and Arthur finally learns her name: Norah Joyce. He proclaims his love for her and wants her to be his wife, but she tells Arthur that she needs time to think. On his way home, Arthur is struck with the thought of his dear friend Dick, and he questions if Dick has also proposed to her. The next day, Norah tells Arthur that she cannot marry him because she must stay with her father, but she admits she is in love with him. Arthur finally meets with Dick, and Dick asks him about his unknown love. Arthur admits that it is Norah, and Dick is very upset. Dick also questions him about buying Murdock's land because Dick does not have as much money as Arthur. Was Arthur trying to place Dick in a false position in Norah's eyes? Arthur explains his plan for buying Murdock's land; he even allows Dick to read the deed from his lawyer, and Dick forgives him.

Arthur goes to Joyce to ask for his daughter's hand in marriage, and Joyce tells him she needs time to think. Joyce tells Arthur that they can be married when the treasure of Knocknacar is found. Arthur believes that Norah is actually the treasure and that her father will never let her go. After Norah speaks to her father alone, Joyce decides to give Norah to Arthur. In the meantime, Dick has discovered that there is iron in the bog, and this could be why Murdock wants to know what's in the bog so badly.

After Murdock learns of Arthur and Norah's engagement, Murdock asks for Norah's hand, and when she refuses, Murdock becomes very angry and makes rude comments about the social class difference between Arthur and Norah. There is an altercation, and Murdock fires Dick. After Murdock leaves, Arthur and Norah decide that she should have two years of schooling in Paris before they are married. Arthur decides to buy the land from Joyce so that he will own all of Knocknacar and the hillside and cliffs. Joyce agrees, and Arthur names Dick the sole protector of the land until he returns from London, where he will be setting up Norah's schooling.

After Arthur returns to London, he finishes his finances with the purchase of the land. When Arthur returns to Ireland, he learns that Murdock has taken in Old Moynahan and kept him very drunk, trying to learn the treasure's location. Moynahan takes Murdock to the spot where the Frenchman was last seen with the gun carriage by his father. They are now on Joyce's land and very close to the bog. Murdock gives Moynahan more whiskey and leads him to walk straight into the bog to his death. Murdock leaves, and Dick saves Moynahan without Murdock seeing, and goes to get help from Joyce and Norah. Murdock is already at Joyce's house, explaining that he cannot find Moynahan and is worried he may have mistakenly walked into the bog. Murdock leaves, and Dick explains what has really happened. The three of them safely bring Moynahan back to Joyce's and help him to bed, but when he awakes the next morning, he remembers nothing of the night before. Joyce lies to Murdock, telling him they found Moynahan asleep on the hillside. Dick returns to the spot Murdock marked the night before and strategically moves the stones he used to mark the treasure spot a few yards away, closer to the bog. Dick then marks the spot with his own marking so Murdock will never know. Dick is very worried that Murdock will try to murder Moynahan again and then come after Norah.

In the next couple of days leading up to Norah's departure, the rain has become increasingly worse, which in turn makes the bog worse. Arthur wakes from a terrible nightmare, sensing something bad is happening in the storm. Andy takes him and Dick to Knocknacar, and they find the bog rising faster and faster. They attempt to warn Murdock, but he is not in his home, so they go to warn Joyce and Norah, who are also missing. They learn that Moynahan came to Norah and said there had been an accident and that Joyce was at Murdock's home. Norah assumed it was some type of trap and pries Moynahan for the truth. Moynahan confesses that her father is not at Murdock's, so Norah decides to go look for her father. Dick and Arthur decide to split up to try to find Joyce and Norah. Arthur searches along the line of the bog while desperately calling out his love's name. As the lightning strikes and lights up the sky, Arthur sees two figures struggling by the edge of the rocks. One figure he discovers is Norah because of her red petticoat. As he gets closer, he sees Murdock holding Norah, strikes her, and runs off. Norah is unconscious as Murdock flees to his house. As Arthur attends to Norah, he feels the ground begin to quiver and give way as his feet begin to sink, and he realizes the bog is shifting and has him in its clutches. Norah awakens and tries to help Arthur by throwing her coat to him and safely pulling him out of the bog. They are joined by Dick and Joyce while they watch Murdock stand atop his home and sink into the bog. The bog then swallows all the rubbish into the nearby sea. Arthur and Norah are reunited with her father and Dick, and they safely make it back to Joyce's home, where they each retell their stories of what happened to them during the storm. After they finish breakfast and warm themselves, the four decide to go out to the hill and examine the damage from the storm. They go to the spot where Moynahan's father had last seen the Frenchman and where Dick had made his own marking. Off behind a rock, Joyce finds a wooden chest. Because Joyce technically owns the land until the next day, the chest belongs to him. Joyce replies that the money was given to Ireland; it should still belong to Ireland. As they continue walking, Dick comes across a cavern where he finds limestone on the rocks. The group takes a lantern into the cave and discovers strange inscriptions on the walls. Norah walks to the back of the cave, where she finds the Lost Crown of Gold. Dick exclaims that there is a scientific basis for the legend. Before the stream cut its way through the limestone and formed the cavern, the waters were forced upward into the lake at the top of the hill, thereby keeping it supplied. The lake then fell away, so once the group reached the lake's water, they found the crown.

The novel then begins the two years during which Norah attends school in Paris. On the land, Dick used the limestone to create the possibility of building waterworks systems, and a new house was built. After the two years of Norah's schooling end, she and Arthur are married and leave for their honeymoon in Italy, where there is "not a cloud in the sky."

== Genre and style ==
Stoker is best known for using a Gothic style of writing throughout his novels. The Snake's Pass is classified as a romantic thriller in a barren western Ireland setting. Stoker also creates the theme of suspense through his character narrations. Severn draws out his narration of the plot to his advantage to create the suspense. While The Snake's Pass is a fictional book, Stoker uses nonfictional themes and ideas, such as the explanation of the bog, to create a more realistic novel.

== Characters ==
Arthur Severn: The main protagonist of the novel. Arthur is brought up in a quiet house by a clergyman and his wife in the west of England. Arthur has little companionship because his mother and father were lost at sea in a terrible bog. His very wealthy aunt takes Arthur into custody and reveals to him that his parents left him a great sum of money. Arthur decides to use that money to travel. Arthur's character is very quiet and Stoker describes him as feeling like an outsider even in his own family.

Andy: This quirky Irishman is Arthur's driver throughout the novel but soon turns into his witty companion. Andy is seen as the dimwitted, comic relief throughout the novel. His character asks Arthur many questions in the novel that Arthur does not want to answer, for he is afraid of his own answer. Andy helps Arthur meet the love of his life, Norah.

Black Murdock: The villain of Carnacliff who will graciously help people when they are in need of money but will hound them for the rest of their life until he has all their money. The people of Carnacliff say that Murdock does not abide by the law either. The Hill has Murdock in its clutches because he is such a greedy man he wants to find the gold of The King of Snakes. Murdock's nickname in the town is the "Gombeen man," which can be described as a shady, business man.

Richard "Dick" Sutherland: Dick is hired by Murdock to do scientific work on the hills and research the shifting bog, but he is not allowed to speak of the work he is doing, according to his employer. Dick and Arthur went to school together in England. Stoker describes him as a burly man.

Phelim Joyce: Joyce owns the other half of the hills that Murdock resides on. Because of an issue with money, Joyce is forced to trade his land with Murdock's so that Murdock can use the new land for research. Joyce has recently lost his wife, and his son has moved away to go to school, so he relies on the help of his daughter, Norah.

Norah Joyce: Norah is Joyce's daughter who has come back to help her father on his land. She is slender, with dark skin, hair and eyes. In addition to being the most beautiful girl, she also has a wonderful singing voice. Her voice is the reason Arthur finds her the first day on the hills. Both Dick and Arthur are in love with the peasant girl, but she has feelings for Arthur.

== Themes ==
=== Weather ===
The novel begins with a dark storm causing the main character to stop his travels. Throughout the novel, impending weather casts a pall over the happiness of the two lovers. In addition, whenever the weather becomes bad, danger is evident through the cloud coverage over the town.

Throughout the novel, the shifting bog is a prevalent and dangerous theme. The townspeople of Carnacliff describe it as a "carpet of death." The bog is known to swallow up anything and anyone in its path. While in the bar, the townspeople tell Arthur about others who have not been so lucky when the bog has appeared. Many people have gone missing because of it. The reader learns in the beginning of the novel that Arthur's parents have died from a bog while they were out at sea. The bog is also the main reason why Arthur decides to stay in Carnacliff until the next morning, During Dick's investigations of the bog, he learns that it is indeed, very dangerous. Dick continually warns Murdock of the bog; however, ultimately Murdock does not listen and the bog swallows him and his home. Arthur is almost taken by the bog as well, but Norah is able to save him.

=== Social class ===
A more subtle theme of The Snake's Pass is the issue of social class. Stoker reveals Arthur to be of a much higher class than the rest of the characters in the novel. Arthur is described as having money bestowed upon him from his parents' death. The town of Carnacliff is more on the peasant side, much different fromwhat Arthur is used to in England. When Arthur happens upon Norah on the hills, he describes her as being a plainly dressed peasant girl, but all still very beautiful. When Andy is discussing with Arthur his ideal wife, Arthur describes her as having dark skin. Andy explains that he is looking for someone that is Black Irish. After Norah and Arthur have expressed their love to each other, she raises the idea that they are not of the same social class and she will be unable to maintain conversation with Arthur's companions once they have married. Even the evil Murdock harasses Norah for being a lower social class. They decide it is best for her to attend school in Paris for two years so that she will be well versed in all the best subjects the school has to offer. At the end of the novel, before they are to be married, Norah asks Arthur if he is pleased with what he sees. Dick and Arthur are also of different social classes, even though they attended the same school. Dick accuses Arthur of trying to make him out in a false position when buying Murdock's land so that he will seem less compared to Arthur in Joyce and Norah's eyes.

=== Science ===
The main theme of the novel centers around the legend of Saint Patrick and the King of Snakes. However, a major issue surrounding the legend is the frightening bog. Dick explains that because the bog is a form of precipitation, there must be a scientific explanation for it. He later discovers that the rain and limestone contribute to the bog. Dick's findings conclude that technology can produce progress. Because Carnacliff is a rural town in Ireland, their scientific research is very minimal. At this time of the century, the Irish could no longer make a living from the land, and needed to find different sources of income. This time was known for the engineering industry of the north of Ireland contributing to the economy of the area. In the conclusion of the novel, Stoker touches on the idea that human emotions of love cannot be controlled by science, and the characters cannot control the weather with science.

== Critical reception ==
In Nicholas Daly's book Modernism, Romance and the Fin de Siècle: Popular Fiction and British Culture he discusses the theme of imperial space for the 19th-century adventure novel. He poses the question of "what would happen if the imperial novel characters never left across many miles of space but rather a less exotic space?". This can be seen in The Snake's Pass as a more domesticated, colonial setting. Daly believes that the novel fails as a fantasy of imperial control. The author also refers to the production and reception of the theme of romance in Stoker's novel. Because Stoker wrote the novel while he was based in London, the question of spatial metaphor is raised. Daly believes that Stoker "fails to capture the nature of the dimensions in which the novel originated and functioned".
