= The Lady of the Shroud =

1909 novel by Bram Stoker

- Front cover of 1909 first edition
- Author: Bram Stoker
- Genre: Epistolary Novel, Gothic, Romance
- Publisher: Heinemann
- Publication date: 1909
- Publication place: United Kingdom
- Media type: Print (hardcover)
- Pages: 367
- LC Class: PZ3.S8743 L PR6037.T617

The Lady of the Shroud is a Gothic and Romance novel by Bram Stoker published by William Heinemann in London in 1909.

It is an epistolary novel, narrated in the first person through letters and diary extracts from various characters, but mainly Rupert. The initial sections, leading up to the reading of the uncle's will, told by other characters, suggest that Rupert is the black sheep of the family.

It is suggested that his uncle is testing his heir because of the condition he placed on the inheritance that he had to live in the castle in the Blue Mountains for a year before he can permanently inherit the unexpectedly large million-pound estate.

== Plot summary ==
Rupert Saint Leger inherits his uncle's estate worth more than one million pounds, on condition that he live for a year in his uncle's castle in the Land of the Blue Mountains on the Dalmatian coast. There, Rupert tries to win the trust of the conservative mountaineer population by using his fortune to buy them modern arms (from a South American country that has unexpectedly found itself at peace) for their fight against the Turkish invasion (the story was written shortly before the Balkan Wars).

One wet night, he is visited in his room in the castle by a pale woman wearing a wet shroud, seeking warmth. He lets her dry herself before his fire, and she flees before morning. She visits several more times, all at night, and they hardly speak, but he falls in love with her, despite thinking she is a vampire. He visits the local church and finds her in a glass-topped stone coffin in the crypt. Despite misgivings, he declares his love, be she living or undead, and she arranges the marriage in an Orthodox ceremony conducted by candlelight in the church one night, although he still does not know her name, and she says she must still live alone in the crypt for the present.

Soon afterwards, she is kidnapped by a forward party of Turkish troops, and he learns that she, Teuta, is not undead, but the living daughter of the local Voivode, who is currently returning from a visit to America. She had fallen into a trance, and was declared dead, but then revived, and the local leaders and clergy spread a story of vampirism which was more acceptable than the truth to the uneducated locals, after the (mistaken) news of her death. Living up to this story, she had spent her days in the coffin in the crypt, but during heavy rain when the crypt flooded, came out seeking warmth in the castle in which she had grown up, and knew all the secret entrances, and hence her meetings with Rupert behind locked the gates.

Rupert leads a relief force which kills her kidnappers and rescues her. But news immediately arrives that the Voivode has just returned to the country only to be kidnapped by Turks himself. They race back to the coast, and Rupert unloads an aeroplane with a near-silent engine from the munitions ship which has also just arrived, along with sets of bullet-proof clothes. The kidnapped Voivode is tracked to a nearby castle ruin, and Rupert pilots the plane onto the castle wall as if it were a balloon or dirigible, and lowers Teuta by rope to her father. He dons a set of the bullet proof clothes which Teuta and Rupert are also wearing, Rupert hauls both up to the aircraft which he silently flies off. The castle is then attacked by local troops and the Turks defeated.

Teuta subsequently reveals her marriage to Rupert to her father, who welcomes him into the family and the country.

== Characters ==
- Rupert Sent (St.) Leger, the protagonist and main narrator
- Teuta Vissarion, the 'Lady of the Shroud', feigning to be undead or a vampire to keep her people's minds calm.
- Aunt Janet (MacKelpie), Rupert's Scottish aunt, with second-sight, who moves to the Balkans to be with him.
- Peter Vissarion, Teuta's father and Voivode of the Blue Mountains.
- Ernest Melton. A relative of Rupert's, a minor character and narrator of the first section of the novel, leading up to the reading of the dead uncle's will in which Rupert inherits instead.

== Publication history ==
The novel was published by William Heinemann in London in 1909.

It was first published in the U.S. in 1966 by the Paperback Library in New York in their Gothic paperback series.
