= The Primrose Path (Stoker novel) =

1875 novel by Bram Stoker

- The Shamrock, February 6, 1875. "Death and Devil" illustration.
- Author: Bram Stoker
- Language: English
- Genre: Novel; temperance novel
- Publisher: The Shamrock
- Publication date: 1875
- Publication place: Ireland
- Media type: Print periodical & hardback & paperback
- Pages: 130

The Primrose Path is an 1875 novel by Bram Stoker. It was the writer's first novel, published and serialized in five installments in The Shamrock, a weekly Irish magazine, from February 6, 1875, to March 6, 1875. The novel contained ten chapters with five illustrations.

The title has a Shakespearean origin. A primrose path is first referred to in Hamlet and in modern usage signifies a pleasant path that leads to ruin. In Hamlet, Act 1, Scene 3, Ophelia castigates her brother, Laertes, not to be a hypocritical "ungracious pastor" who tells her to take the hard, virtuous path to heaven while he "Himself the primrose path of dalliance treads".

It is a "temperance tale" about Jerry O’Sullivan, a carpenter from Dublin who settles in London. Unable to find a good job after suffering an injury and being discharged, he becomes an alcoholic, falls into poverty, and is ravaged by jealousy. He ends up killing his wife and committing suicide.

In 1999, it was republished by Desert Island Books, an independent publisher based in Westcliff-on-Sea, Essex, founded in 1992 by Clive Leatherdale, with an introduction by Richard Dalby and also containing the 1875 short story "Buried Treasures".

== Plot summary ==
The tale revolves around Jerry O'Sullivan, a Dublin theatrical carpenter, who moves to London, seeking a better job. An acquaintance, John Sebright, had sent him a letter from London telling him about a job opportunity there. As the story opens, Jerry and his wife Katey entertain guests at their home and engage in lively discussions.

One guest, Parnell, offers an allegory that foreshadows the tragedy that unfolds in the story. He makes a sketch titled "To and Fro" depicting Death and the Devil riding together on a single horse. The lesson he seeks to impart is that the Devil and Death are intertwined. The conclusion is that any vice or misjudgment, such as drinking, will ineluctably lead to death. The first illustration, entitled "Death and Devil", shows them riding a horse together. The head of Death is a skull wearing a large hat. This is the allegorical meaning or lesson of the tale.

Against the better judgement of the people surrounding him, including his wife and mother, Jerry decides to go to London with his faithful wife Katey and their children. They travel to London by ship on a three-day journey. There is an air of foreboding.

O'Sullivan is hired as the head carpenter in a squalid theatre in London. One of the productions they are performing there is Charles Gounod's 1859 opera Faust, about a man who sells his soul to the devil, Méphistophélès, in return for earthly success. The word "vampire" is also mentioned. He and his family find lodging near the theater. His co-workers induce him to visit a nearby "public house" where he is introduced to beer and other alcoholic drinks. On one occasion, attempting to stop a barroom brawl, he is struck over the head by one of the combatants with a chair and badly injured, cutting his head. He becomes intoxicated on one occasion but is determined thereafter to stay sober and avoid drinking.

A serious head injury at the theater when the Muldoons visit results in his hospitalization and the loss of his job. He is unable to find adequate employment and becomes frustrated and dejected. This results in his finding solace in drinking and gambling at the pub. As his wife Katey seeks to dissuade him from this downward spiral, she incurs his wrath. Their relationship is destroyed. He no longer confides in her. He even strikes her.

The next calamity occurs when he is arrested for assault and jailed. He is sentenced to imprisonment for a week after the judge notices his wife's facial injuries. During this upheaval, she is visited by Grinnell, the bartender and owner of the pub. She suspects ulterior motives. She overhears workmen relate how they suspect that Grinnell is secretly encouraging Jerry's drunkenness in order to make advances towards her. This results in her turning her anger against Grinnell.

After these misfortunes, he is strongly tempted by and eventually brought down by alcohol. Katey resists Grinnell's advances. "It's war --- is it then?" he asks her. He makes threats that cause her to faint. He calls the police after Katey faints in the street, telling them that she is drunk. She is taken into custody by the police for drunkenness, but is eventually freed.

Out of money and having no prospects of finding employment after losing his second job at the theater, Jerry pawns his prized carpenter tools. Katey, in turn, pawns her wedding ring to redeem the tools. An ungrateful Jerry is only more incensed. The final straw is when he hears rumors that Katey has conspired with Grinnell. This convinces Jerry to take action. Unjustly suspecting his wife Katey of infidelity, he murders her with a hammer and then cuts his throat with a chisel in the garret where they live in front of their children.

== Bibliography ==
- Cadeddu, Manuel. "(Not So) Safe Houses in Bram Stoker’s The Primrose Path." Review of Irish Studies in Europe 3.1 (2019): 159-70.
- Maunder, Andrew (December 2006). Bram Stoker. Writers and Their Work. UK: Liverpool University Press, Northcote House Publishers.
- Stoker, Bram. The Primrose Path by Bram Stoker. Delphi Classics (Illustrated). Volume 1. 2017.
- Valente, Joseph. Dracula's Crypt: Bram Stoker, Irishness, and the Question of Blood. University of Illinois Press: 2002. ISBN 978-0-252-02696-6
- The Primrose Path, 1875. Novels. bramstoker.org. Retrieved 21 February 2026.
