= Personal Reminiscences of Henry Irving =

- First UK edition (2 volumes)
- Author: Bram Stoker
- Language: English
- Genre: Biography
- Publisher: Heinemann (UK); Macmillan (US)
- Publication date: 1906
- Publication place: United Kingdom
- Media type: Print (hardcover)

Personal Reminiscences of Henry Irving is the third book of non-fiction by Bram Stoker, published in 1906. It is a biography of the English actor Sir Henry Irving. The work was released nine years after the publication of Dracula.

The book was published in two volumes by Heinemann in London in 1906 and in a single volume in 1907. The work was published in the U.S. by Macmillan in 1906.

== Background ==
The biography details the life and career of his close friend and business partner, Sir Henry Irving. The memoir chronicles, in a firsthand account, Irving's rise to fame, his acting methodology, and his influence and impact on British theater. Stoker had been Irving's business manager for over 27 years. He managed the Lyceum Theatre, London, where Irving performed, from 1878 to 1898. Irving was one of the major actors in the UK at that time, becoming the first actor to be knighted. The book provides historical insights into Victorian theater and details the close collaboration between Irving and Stoker over several decades. Stoker gives a rare autobiographical glimpse into his own career and life during this period in his biography of Henry Irving.
