= Snowbound: The Record of a Theatrical Touring Party =

Short story collection

- First edition
- Author: Bram Stoker
- Language: English
- Genre: Short stories
- Publisher: Collier and Company
- Publication date: 1908
- Publication place: United Kingdom
- Media type: Print (paperback)
- Pages: 256

Snowbound: The Record of a Theatrical Touring Party (1908) is a collection of linked short stories by Bram Stoker, after the success of Dracula in 1897 and the death of Henry Irving in 1905. It was published by Collier in London as a paperback in 1908.

The book is set in rural Scotland, where a party of travelling actors, trapped in a train by snow, tell each other stories to pass the time. The book is influenced by Stoker's years in the service of Sir Henry Irving and an incident during the Lyceum Company's 1904 North American tour, when members were trapped in a snowbound train.

It is a collection of fifteen stories that are tied together as a series with segues between each that create a unifying thematic thread.

== Stories ==
In the Preface, Stoker writes: "The Truth - or rather Accuracy - of these Stories may be accepted or not as the Reader pleases. They are given as Fiction."

The stories in this collection are:

- The Occasion --- (The opening story is the collection's framing narrative. A train carrying a traveling theatrical company becomes stuck in a severe Scottish snowstorm, forcing the actors to build a fire and narrate stories to stave off the freezing cold.)
- A Lesson in Pets --- (This story details humorous and chaotic interactions, focusing on the comedic misunderstandings that arise when eccentric individuals deal with strange or unusual pets.)
- Coggins's Property --- (A comedy of errors about a misunderstanding regarding a "property" which leads to romantic complications and legal mix-ups within the theatrical company.)
- The Slim Syrens --- (A story about a group of older actresses or performers who attempt to stay physically and socially relevant, vering into social satire and drawing-room comedy.)
- A New Departure in Art --- (Recounts the humorous exploits of an artist attempting a radical new, slightly absurd style of creation that causes confusion among his peers and patrons.)
- Mick the Devil --- (A darker and more superstitious tale passed down among the crew which focuses on a particularly mischievous and troublesome character who acts like a bad omen.)
- In Fear of Death --- (The mod or tone changes to psychological suspense, where an individual must face their deepest anxieties and what happens when you believe your death is imminent.)
- At Last --- (A romantic and melodramatic narrative examining the resolution of a prolonged and unrequited love affair, ending in a joyous union for the main couple.)
- Chin Music --- (Based on Stoker's travels in the United States, this story involves burly sleeping car passengers whose night is completely disrupted by the unexpected arrival of a mewling infant.)
- A Deputy Waiter --- (A backstage and behind-the-scenes comedy about the trials and tribulations of waitstaff and stagehands who have to deal with the eccentric demands of the theatrical elites.)
- Work'us --- (A story focusing on class dynamics and the theater, focusing on a hardworking individual whose tireless efforts often go unnoticed until they finally prove their value.)
- A Corner in Dwarfs --- (A bizarre fantasy story relying on local myths, exploring an unusual situation involving a group of small, mysterious, and magical beings.)
- A Criminal Star --- (An intriguing and dramatic tale involving a star performer who becomes wrapped up in a scandalous, potentially unlawful situation, bringing risks into the entertainment community.)
- A Star Trap --- (A theater setting involving jealousy in a love triangle and a murder attempt centered on a dangerous, mechanical trapdoor used during stage performances.)
- A Moon-Light Effect --- (This final story is based around a mysterious and near-supernatural occurrence, blending classic Gothic tropes with a romantic twist ending.)

== Publication history ==
It was originally published in 1908 in the United Kingdom by Collier & Co. under Collier’s Shilling Library as a 256 page paperback with the cover featuring a snowbound train. Stoker had written several of the stories during a span of ten years prior to the publication of the collection. Several of its stories had made standalone appearances in U.S. and UK newspapers during this pre-publication period..

It was republished in an annotated hardcover edition by Desert Island Books in 2000, annotated and edited by Bruce Wightman. The cover retained the original image of a snowbound train.

The short story "A Star Trap" was anthologized in The Bram Stoker Bedside Companion (1990) collection, the Best Ghost and Horror Stories (1997) anthology, and in Midnight Tales (1973), retitled as "Death in the Wings"

== Sources ==
- Hughes, William. Beyond Dracula: Bram Stoker’s Fiction and Its Cultural Context. Springer, 2000.
- Senf, Carol A., ed. The Critical Introduction to Bram Stoker. Westport, Conn.: Greenwood Press, 1993.
- Shepherd, Mike. When Brave Men Shudder: The Scottish Origins of Dracula. Newcastle upon Tyne, UK: Wild Wolf Publishing, 2018.
- Stoker, Bram. The Bram Stoker Bedside Companion: Stories of fantasy and horror. Edited and with an Introduction by Charles Osborne. London: Victor Gollancz Ltd., 1973.
- Stoker, Bram. Midnight Tales. Edited by Peter Haining. London: Peter Owen, 1990.
- Stoker, Bram. Best Ghost and Horror Stories. Edited and with an Introduction by Richard Dalby. New York: Dover, 1997, p. 221.
