= Bram Stoker =

Irish author (1847–1912)

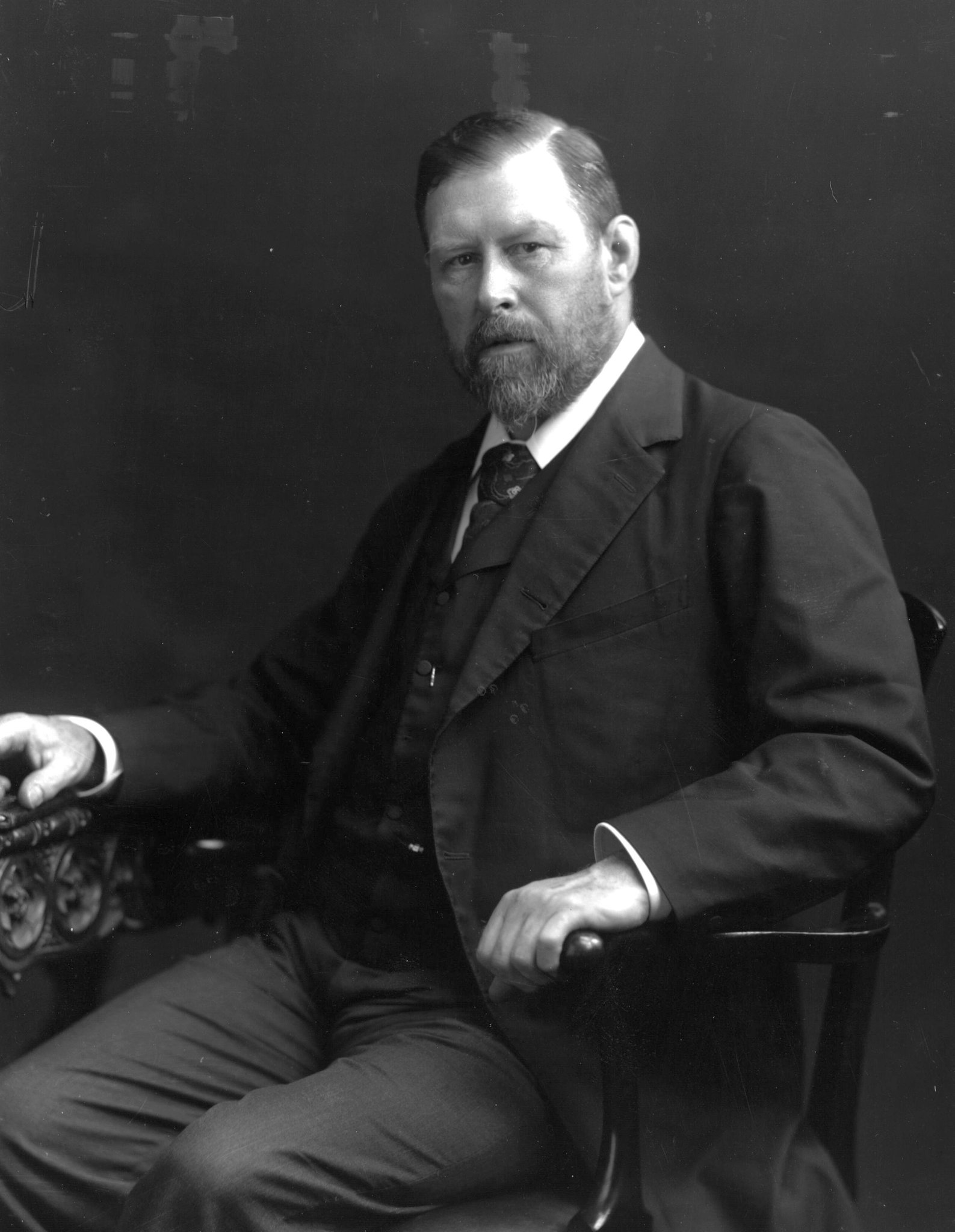
- Stoker in 1906
- Born: Abraham Stoker; 8 November 1847; Clontarf, Dublin, Ireland
- Died: 20 April 1912 (aged 64); Pimlico, London, England
- Resting place: Golders Green Crematorium, London
- Education: Trinity College Dublin; (BA, MA)
- Occupations: Writer; barrister; literary critic; theatre manager
- Spouse: Florence Balcombe (m. 1878)
- Children: 1
- Parent: Charlotte Stoker (mother)
- Relatives: Sir William Thornley Stoker (brother); Sir William Thomson (brother-in-law); Dacre Stoker (great great-nephew)
- Writing career
- Pen name: Bram Stoker
- Language: English
- Years active: 1879–1911
- Period: Victorian era, Edwardian era
- Genres: Gothic fiction, romantic fiction, horror fiction, vampire literature
- Notable works: Under the Sunset (1881); The Fate of Fenella (1892); Dracula (1897); The Mystery of the Sea (1902); The Jewel of Seven Stars (1903); The Lady of the Shroud (1909); The Lair of the White Worm (1911)
- Movement: Dark romanticism
- Website: The Bram Stoker Estate

Abraham Stoker (8 November 1847 – 20 April 1912) was an Irish writer, barrister, literary critic, and theatre manager. He was the author of the Gothic horror novel Dracula (1897) and the creator of the fictional character Count Dracula. The work and its antagonist are regarded as milestones in the fields of Gothic and vampire literature.

Stoker was the third of seven children and was bedridden for the first seven years of his life with an undiagnosed illness. He received his initial education at home, before enrolling at Trinity College Dublin in 1864. He excelled as a rugby athlete and was a prominent member of both the university's student union and its philosophical society. It was during this period that Stoker was initially introduced to literature, eventually becoming the auditor of the College Historical Society and writing his first paper.

At the outset of his career, Stoker spent ten years in the civil service at Dublin Castle, during which time he was also a drama critic for the Dublin Evening Mail. Following this, he was employed as a theatre critic for several newspapers, including the Daily Telegraph, and occasionally wrote short stories and theatre commentaries. He also served as the personal assistant of the actor Sir Henry Irving and the business manager of the West End's Lyceum Theatre, which Irving owned. While a theatre critic, Stoker founded the "Dublin Sketching Club" in 1879, which dealt mostly with art collections. He regularly travelled during his free time, particularly to Cruden Bay in Scotland, which was the setting for two of his novels and also served as the inspiration for writing Dracula. He was a close friend of Hall Caine and an acquaintance of Arthur Conan Doyle, Oscar Wilde and many others prominent cultural figures. He collaborated with other authors for experimental novels such as The Fate of Fenella (1892).

Stoker wrote numerous works of fiction and non-fiction across several genres, but his literary reputation rests solely with Dracula. Since the early 20th century, the novel has become one of the best-selling works of vampire fiction, with Count Dracula entering the public imagination as one of the best-known fictional figures of the Victorian era. The work also shaped future representations of vampiric characters and themes, making Stoker "the father of vampire fiction."

== Early life ==
Stoker was born on 8 November 1847 at 15 Marino Crescent, Clontarf, in Dublin, Ireland. The park adjacent to the house is now known as Bram Stoker Park. His parents were Abraham Stoker (1799–1876), an Anglo-Irishman from Dublin, and Charlotte Mathilda Blake Thornley (1818–1901), of English and Irish descent, who was raised in County Sligo. Stoker was the third of seven children, the eldest of whom was Sir Thornley Stoker, 1st Baronet. Abraham and Charlotte were members of the Church of Ireland Parish of Clontarf and attended the parish church with their children, who were baptised there. Abraham was a senior civil servant.

Stoker was bedridden with an unknown illness until he started school at the age of seven when he made a complete recovery. Of this time, Stoker wrote, "I was naturally thoughtful, and the leisure of long illness gave opportunity for many thoughts which were fruitful according to their kind in later years." He was privately educated at Bective House school run by the Reverend William Woods.

After his recovery, he grew up without further serious illnesses, even excelling as an athlete at Trinity College, Dublin, which he attended from 1864 to 1870. He graduated with a BA in 1870 and paid to receive his MA in 1875. Though he later in life recalled graduating "with honours in mathematics", this appears to have been a mistake. He was named University Athlete, participating in multiple sports, including playing rugby for Dublin University. He was auditor of the College Historical Society (the Hist) and president of the University Philosophical Society (he remains the only student in Trinity's history to hold both positions), where his first paper was on Sensationalism in Fiction and Society.

== Early career and marriage ==
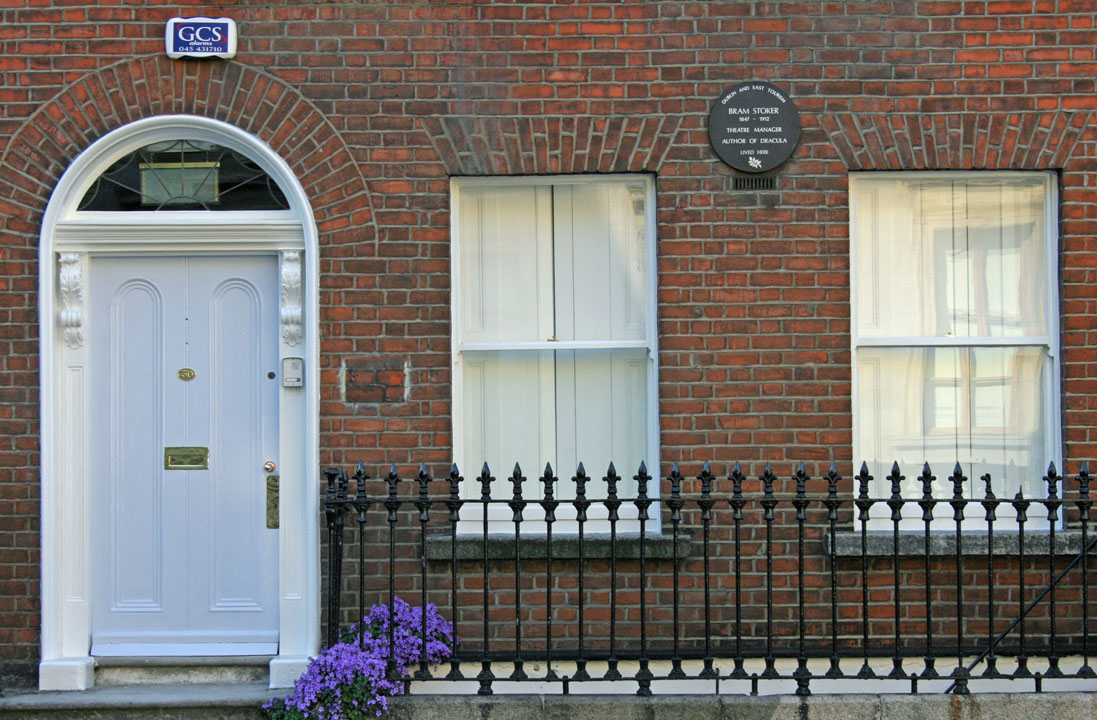
Bram Stoker's former home featuring a commemorative plaque, Kildare Street, Dublin

Stoker became interested in the theatre while a student through his friend Dr. Maunsell. While working for the Irish Civil Service, he became the theatre critic for the Dublin Evening Mail, which was co-owned by Sheridan Le Fanu, an author of Gothic tales. Theatre critics were held in low esteem at the time, but Stoker attracted notice by the quality of his reviews. In December 1876, he gave a favourable review of Henry Irving's Hamlet at the Theatre Royal in Dublin. Irving invited Stoker for dinner at the Shelbourne Hotel where he was staying, and they became friends.

Stoker also wrote short stories, novels, and novellas; his first short story, "The Crystal Cup", was published by the London Society in 1872, followed by the novel The Primrose Path in five parts and the novella The Chain of Destiny in four parts in The Shamrock in 1875. In 1876, while a civil servant in Dublin, Stoker wrote the non-fiction book The Duties of Clerks of Petty Sessions in Ireland (published 1879), which remained a standard work. Furthermore, he possessed an interest in art and was a founder of the Dublin Sketching Club in 1879.

In 1878 Stoker married Florence Balcombe, daughter of Lieutenant-Colonel James Balcombe and Phillipa Anne Balcombe of Clontarf, Dublin. She was a celebrated beauty whose former suitor had been Oscar Wilde. Stoker knew the Wilde family well, although his acquaintance with Oscar Wilde was not close.

== Lyceum Theatre ==
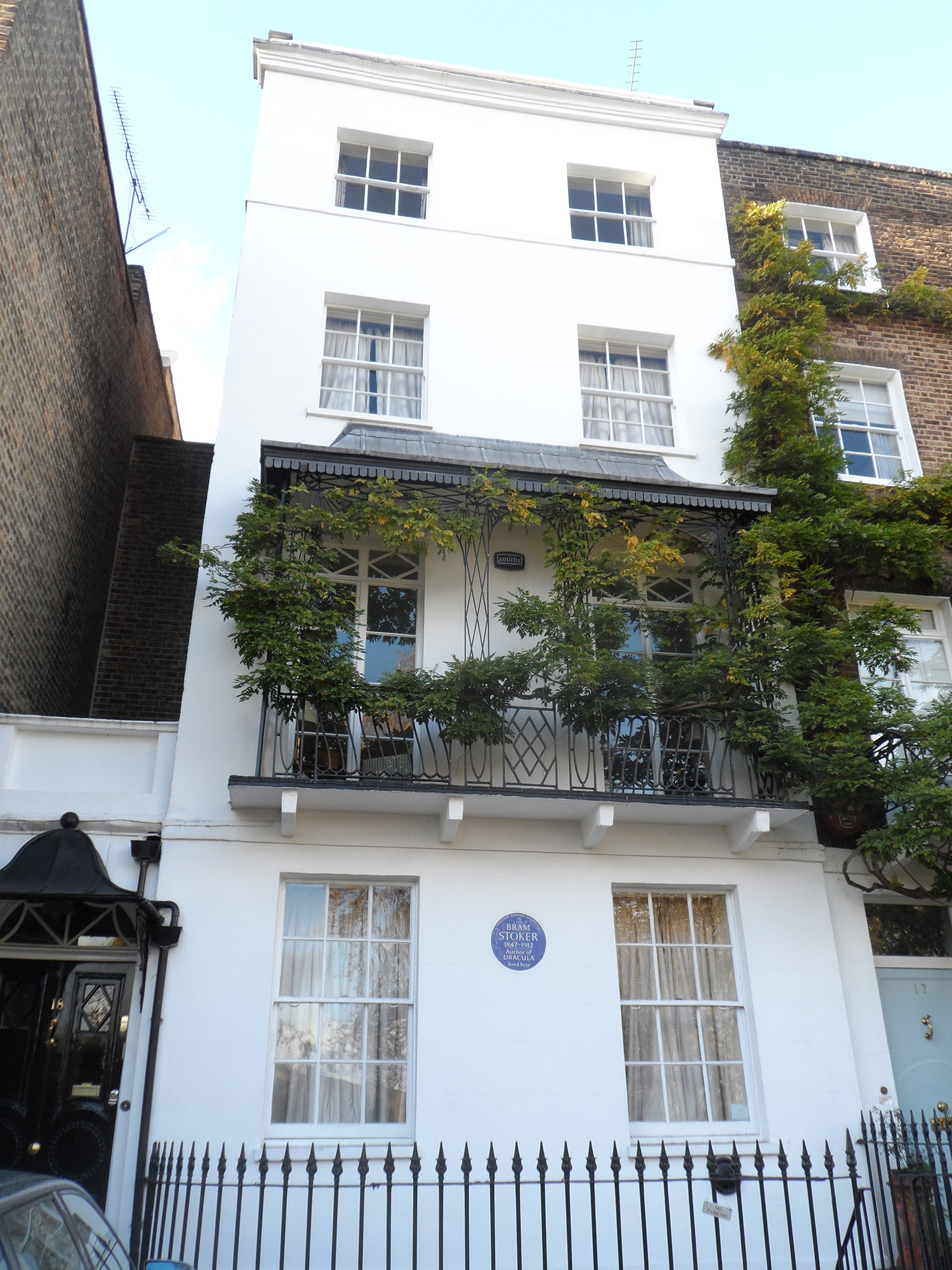
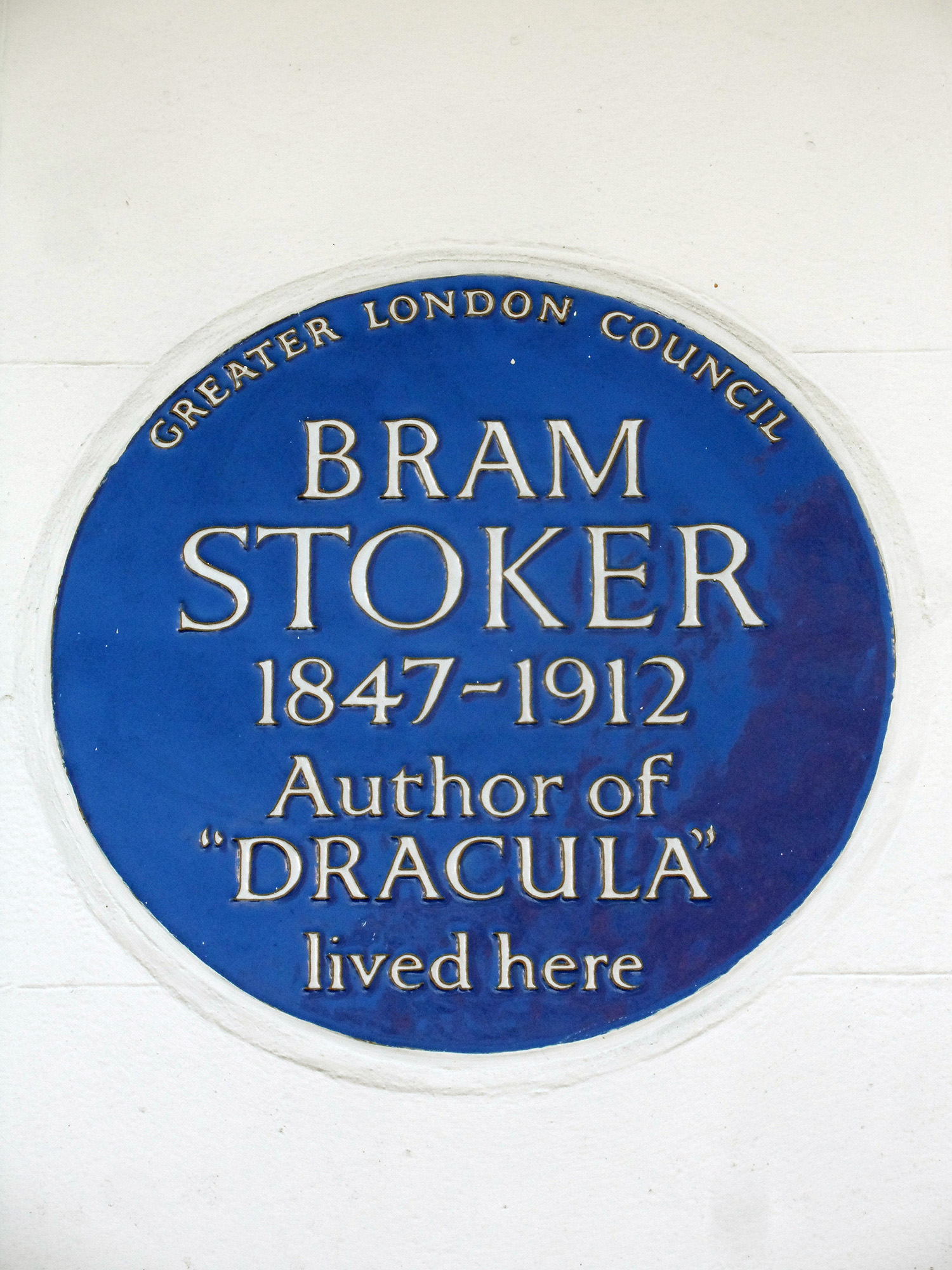
Left: Stoker's residence at 18 St Leonard's Terrace, Chelsea, London. Right: Close up of the commemorative blue plaque at the address.

The Stokers moved to London, where Stoker became acting manager and then business manager of Irving's Lyceum Theatre in the West End, a post he held for 27 years. On 31 December 1879, Bram and Florence's only child was born, a son whom they christened Irving Noel Thornley Stoker. The collaboration with Henry Irving was important for Stoker and through him, he became involved in London's high society, where he met James Abbott McNeill Whistler and Sir Arthur Conan Doyle. Working for Irving, the most famous actor of his time, and managing one of the most successful theatres in London made Stoker a notable if busy man. He was dedicated to Irving and his memoirs show he idolised him. In London, Stoker also met Hall Caine, who became one of his closest friends – he dedicated Dracula to him.

In the course of Irving's tours, Stoker travelled the world, although he never visited Eastern Europe, a setting for his most famous novel. Stoker enjoyed the United States, where Irving was popular. With Irving, he was invited twice to the White House and knew William McKinley and Theodore Roosevelt. Stoker set two of his novels in America and used Americans as characters, the most notable being Quincey Morris. He also met one of his literary idols, Walt Whitman, having written to him in 1872 an extraordinary letter that some have interpreted as the expression of a deeply-suppressed homosexuality.

== Cruden Bay ==
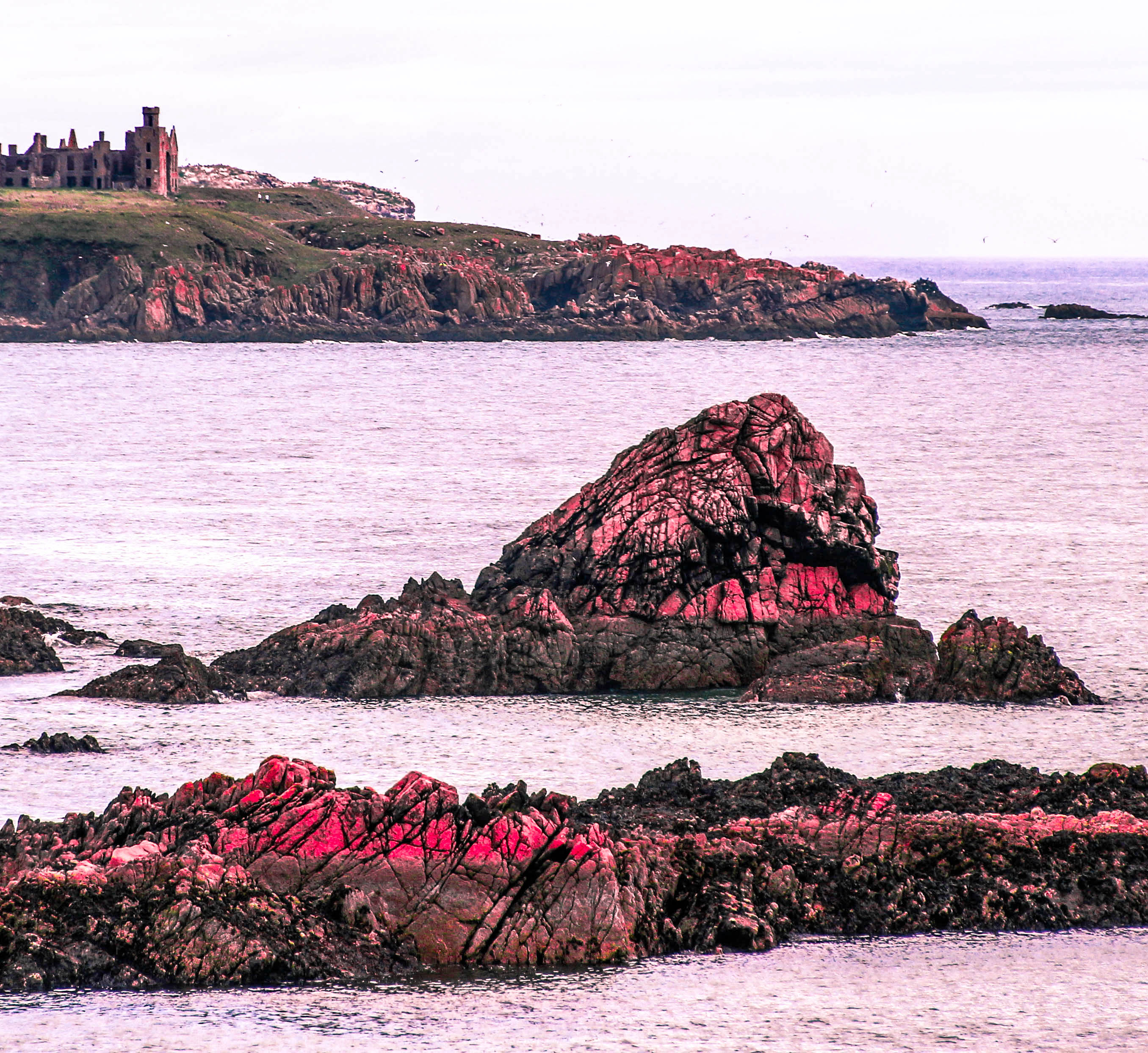
Slains Castle, Cruden Bay. The early chapters of Dracula were written in Cruden Bay, and Slains Castle possibly provided visual inspiration for Bram Stoker during the writing phase.

Stoker was a regular visitor to Cruden Bay in Scotland between 1892 and 1910. His month-long holidays to the Aberdeenshire coastal village provided a large portion of available time for writing his books. Two novels were set in Cruden Bay: The Watter's Mou' (1895) and The Mystery of the Sea (1902). He started writing Dracula there in 1895 while in residence at the Kilmarnock Arms Hotel. The guest book with his signatures from 1894 and 1895 still survives. The nearby Slains Castle (also known as New Slains Castle) is linked with Bram Stoker and plausibly provided the visual palette for the descriptions of Castle Dracula during the writing phase. A distinctive room in Slains Castle, the octagonal hall, matches the description of the octagonal room in Castle Dracula.

== Writings ==
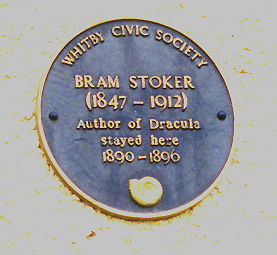
Commemorative plaque in Whitby, North Yorkshire, the English coastal town frequented by Stoker, and where Count Dracula comes ashore in Dracula

Stoker visited the English coastal town of Whitby in 1890, and that visit was said to be part of the inspiration for Dracula, staying at a guesthouse in West Cliff at 6 Royal Crescent, doing his research at the subscription library at 7 Pier Road (now Quayside Fish and Chips). Count Dracula comes ashore at Whitby, and in the shape of a black dog runs up the 199 steps to the graveyard of St Mary's Church in the shadow of the Whitby Abbey ruins. Stoker began writing novels while working as manager for Irving and secretary and director of London's Lyceum Theatre, beginning with The Snake's Pass in 1890 and Dracula in 1897. During this period, he was part of the literary staff of The Daily Telegraph in London, and he wrote other fiction, including the horror novels The Lady of the Shroud (1909) and The Lair of the White Worm (1911). He published his Personal Reminiscences of Henry Irving in 1906, after Irving's death, which proved successful, and managed productions at the Prince of Wales Theatre.

Before writing Dracula, Stoker met Ármin Vámbéry, a Hungarian-Jewish writer and traveller (born in Szent-György, Kingdom of Hungary now Svätý Jur, Slovakia). Dracula likely emerged from Vámbéry's dark stories of the Carpathian Mountains. However this claim has been challenged by many including Elizabeth Miller, a professor who, since 1990, has had as her major field of research and writing Dracula, and its author, sources, and influences. She has stated, "The only comment about the subject matter of the talk was that Vambery 'spoke loudly against Russian aggression.'" There had been nothing in their conversations about the "tales of the terrible Dracula" that are supposed to have "inspired Stoker to equate his vampire-protagonist with the long-dead tyrant." At any rate, by this time, Stoker's novel was well under way, and he was already using the name Dracula for his vampire. Stoker then spent several years researching Central and East European folklore and mythological stories of vampires.

Actor Sir Henry Irving, for whom Stoker was a personal assistant, is widely viewed as an inspiration for the Count.

The 1972 book In Search of Dracula by Radu Florescu and Raymond McNally claimed that the Count in Stoker's novel was based on Vlad the Impaler (Vlad III Dracula). However, according to Elizabeth Miller, Stoker borrowed only the name and "scraps of miscellaneous information" about Romanian history; further, there are no comments about Vlad III in the author's working notes. There is however almost unanimous consensus that Dracula was inspired, in part, by Henry Irving, with Stoker's contemporaries remarking upon the similarity. Stoker had praised a performance of Irving as "a wonderful impression of a dead man fictitiously alive [with eyes like] cinders of glowing red from out the marble face".

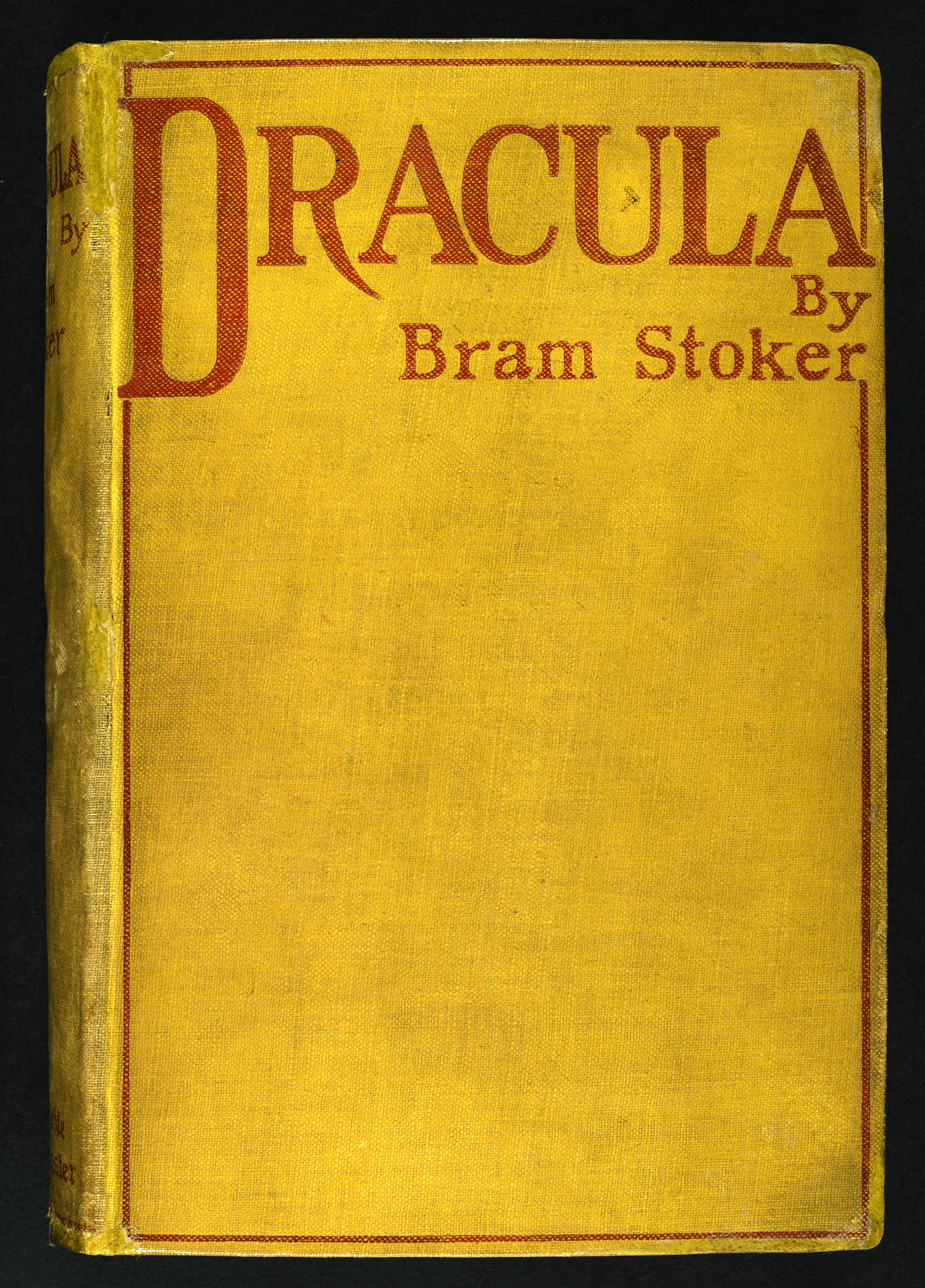
The first-edition cover of Dracula

Dracula is an epistolary novel, written as a collection of realistic but completely fictional diary entries, telegrams, letters, ship's logs, and newspaper clippings, all of which added a level of detailed realism to the story, a skill which Stoker had developed as a newspaper writer. At the time of its publication, Dracula was considered a "straightforward horror novel" based on imaginary creations of supernatural life. "It gave form to a universal fantasy ... and became a part of popular culture." It is one of the most famous works in English literature, and the titular character of Count Dracula has been adapted more times than any other fictional figure. The book also established Stoker's reputation as one of the most acclaimed writers of Gothic horror fiction.

According to the Encyclopedia of World Biography, Stoker's stories are today included in the categories of horror fiction, romanticized Gothic stories, and melodrama. They are classified alongside other works of popular fiction, such as Mary Shelley's Frankenstein, which also used the myth-making and story-telling method of having multiple narrators telling the same tale from different perspectives. According to historian Jules Zanger, this leads the reader to the assumption that "they can't all be lying".

The original 541-page typescript of Dracula was believed to have been lost until it was found in a barn in northwestern Pennsylvania in the early 1980s. It consisted of typed sheets with many emendations, and handwritten on the title page was "THE UN-DEAD." The author's name was shown at the bottom as Bram Stoker. Author Robert Latham remarked: "the most famous horror novel ever published, its title changed at the last minute". The typescript was purchased by Microsoft co-founder Paul Allen.

Stoker's inspirations for the story, in addition to Whitby, may have included a visit to Slains Castle in Aberdeenshire, a visit to the crypts of St. Michan's Church in Dublin, and the novella Carmilla by Sheridan Le Fanu. Stoker's original research notes for the novel are kept by the Rosenbach Museum and Library in Philadelphia. A facsimile edition of the notes was created by Elizabeth Miller and Robert Eighteen-Bisang in 2008.

== Stoker at the London Library ==
Stoker was a member of the London Library and conducted much of the research for Dracula there. In 2018, the Library discovered some of the books that Stoker used for his research, complete with notes and marginalia.

== Death ==
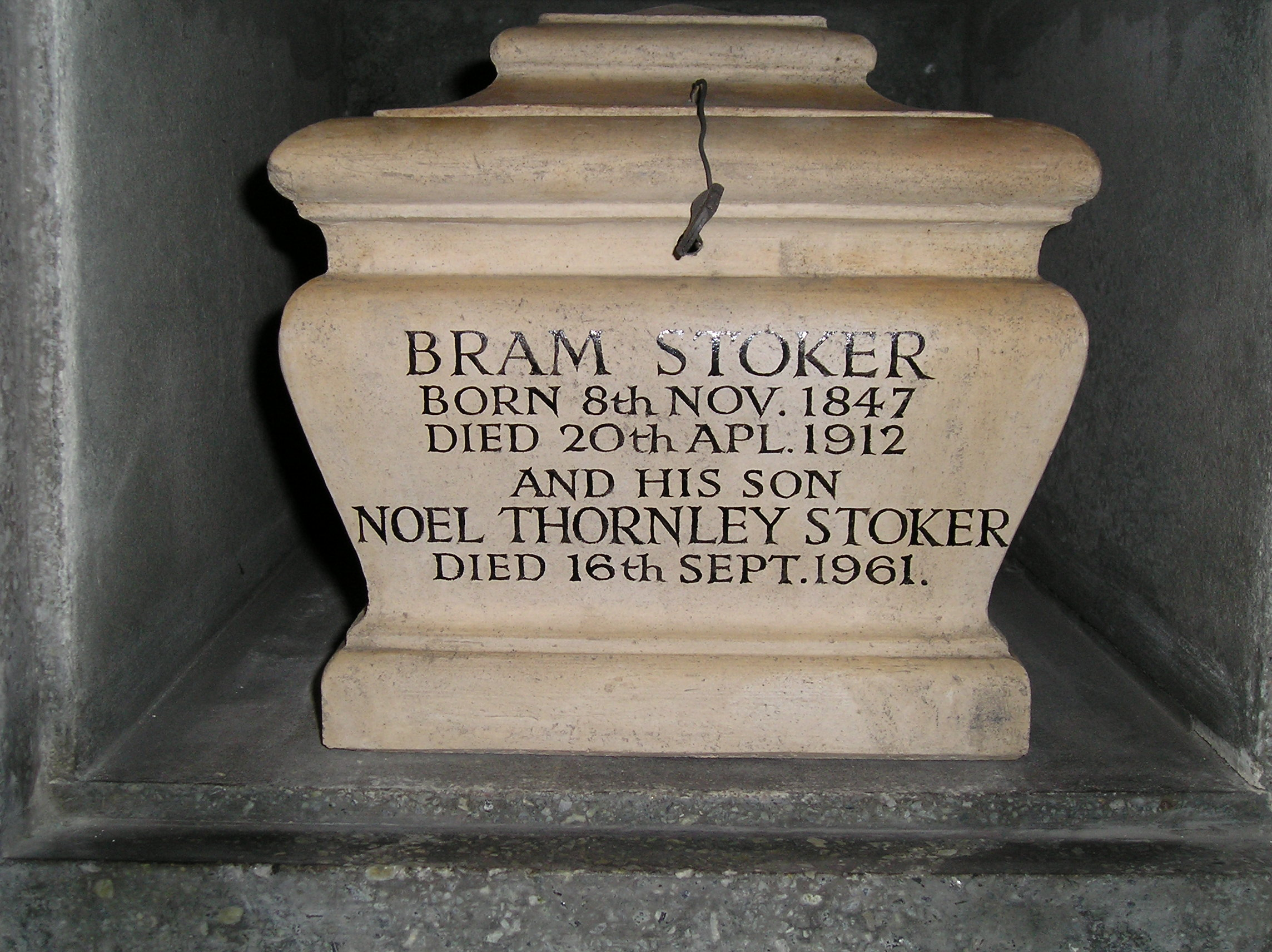
Shared urn which contains Stoker's and his son's ashes in Golders Green Crematorium, north London

After suffering a number of strokes, Stoker died at No. 26 St George's Square, London on 20 April 1912. Some biographers attribute the cause of death to overwork, others to tertiary syphilis. His death certificate listed the cause of death as "Locomotor ataxia 6 months", presumed to be a reference to syphilis. He was cremated, and his ashes are contained in a display urn at Golders Green Crematorium in north London. The ashes of Irving Noel Stoker, the author's son, were added to his father's urn following his death in 1961. The original plan had been to keep his parents' ashes together, but after Florence Stoker's death on 25 May 1937, her ashes were scattered at the Gardens of Rest, Golders Green.

== Beliefs and philosophy ==
Stoker was raised a Protestant in the Church of Ireland. He was a strong supporter of the Liberal Party and took a keen interest in Irish affairs. As a "philosophical home ruler", he supported Home Rule for Ireland brought about by peaceful means. He remained an ardent monarchist who believed that Ireland should remain within the British Empire. He was an admirer of Prime Minister William Ewart Gladstone, whom he knew personally, and supported his plans for Ireland.

Stoker believed in progress and took a keen interest in science and science-based medicine. Some of Stoker's novels represent early examples of science fiction, such as The Lady of the Shroud (1909). He had a writer's interest in the occult, notably mesmerism, but he despised fraud and he believed in the superiority of the scientific method over superstition. Stoker counted among his friends J. W. Brodie-Innis, a member of the Hermetic Order of the Golden Dawn, and hired member Pamela Colman Smith as an artist for the Lyceum Theatre, but no evidence suggests that Stoker ever joined the Order himself.

Like Irving, who was an active Freemason, Stoker also became a member of the order, "initiated into Freemasonry in Buckingham and Chandos Lodge No. 1150 in February 1883, passed in April of that same year, and raised to the degree of Master Mason on 20 June 1883." Stoker however was not a particularly active Freemason, spent only six years as an active member, and did not take part in any Masonic activities during his time in London.

== Legacy ==
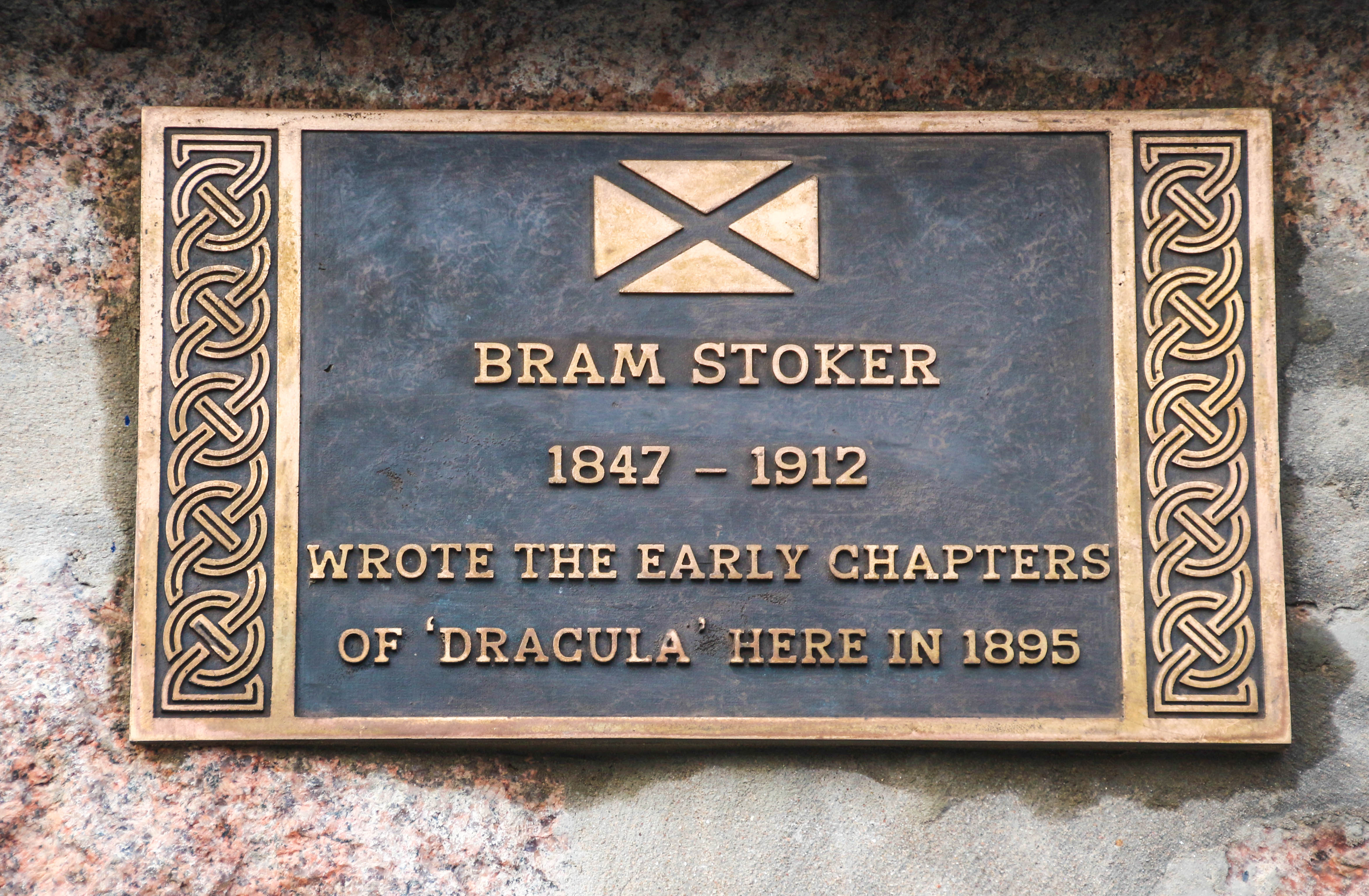
Plaque in Cruden Bay, Scotland marking where Stoker wrote the early chapters of Dracula

His novel Dracula has become one of the most influential and best-known works of both vampire fiction and English literature. Count Dracula is also ranked among the most depicted fictional characters of the Victorian era, with over 700 adaptations. The significance of the novel and its direct impact on subsequent vampire-themed works led to Stoker being popularly regarded as "the father of vampire fiction." The short story collection Dracula's Guest and Other Weird Stories was published in 1914 by Stoker's widow, Florence Stoker, who was also his literary executrix.

A monument to Stoker has been erected at the Borgo Pass, 45 kilometres (28 miles) from Bistritz (Romania) at an altitude of 1,200 metres (3,900 ft).

An annual festival takes place in Dublin in honour of Stoker's literary achievements. The Dublin City Council Bram Stoker Festival encompasses spectacles, literary events, film, family-friendly activities and outdoor events, and takes place every October Bank Holiday Weekend in Dublin. The festival is supported by the Bram Stoker Estate and is funded by Dublin City Council. Dacre Stoker, Stoker's great great-nephew, his wife Jennes Stoker and Stoker's great-grandson Robin Guy MacCaw, are the co-owners of Bram Stoker LLC, which represents the descendants of Bram Stoker in the UK and controls the international rights and trademarks of the Bram Stoker Estate.

== Bibliography ==
=== Novels ===
==== Supernatural ====
- Dracula (1897)
- The Jewel of Seven Stars (1903, revised 1912)
- The Lair of the White Worm (1911); issued also as The Garden of Evil. It was posthumously abridged in 1925 by some publishers from 40 chapters to 28 chapters

==== Others ====
- The Primrose Path (1875)
- The Chain of Destiny (novella) (1875)
- The Snake's Pass (1890)
- The Watter's Mou' (novella) (1895)
- The Shoulder of Shasta (1895)
- Miss Betty (1898)
- The Mystery of the Sea (1902)
- The Man (1905); issued also as The Gates of Life
- Lady Athlyne (1908)
- The Lady of the Shroud (1909)

=== Short fiction ===
==== Supernatural novella ====
- The Chain of Destiny (1875)

==== Supernatural short stories ====
1. Saved by a Ghost (28 December 1873); published anonymously
2. The Invisible Giant (1881)
3. The Shadow Builder (1881)
4. The Castle of the King (1881)
5. Gibbet Hill (17 December 1890)
6. The Judge's House (5 December 1891)
7. The Secret of the Growing Gold (23 January 1892)
8. Crooken Sands (1 December 1894)
9. Dracula's Guest (1914); the excised first chapter of Dracula, published posthumously

==== Short story collections ====
- Under the Sunset (1881); eight fairy tales for children
- Snowbound: The Record of a Theatrical Touring Party (1908)
- Dracula's Guest and Other Weird Stories (1914); posthumous

==== Uncollected stories ====
Title	Date of earliest appearance	Earliest appearance	Notes
"The Crystal Cup"	September 1872	London Society (London)	
"Buried Treasures"	13 March 1875 and 20 March 1875	The Shamrock (Dublin)	
The Chain of Destiny (novella)	1 May 1875 to 22 May 1875	The Shamrock (Dublin)	
"Our New House"	23 November 1885	The Theatre Annual (London)	
"The Dualitists; or, The Death Doom of the Double Born"	November 1886	The Theatre Annual (London)	
"The Gombeen Man"	1890	The People (London)	Chapter 3 of The Snake's Pass
"Gibbet Hill"	17 December 1890	Daily Express (Dublin)	
"The Night of the Shifting Bog"	January 1891	Current Literature: A Magazine of Record and Review, Vol. VI, No. 1. (New York)	Chapter 17 of The Snake's Pass
"Lord Castleton Explains"	30 January 1892	The Gentlewoman: The Illustrated Weekly Journal for Gentlewomen (London)	Chapter 10 of The Fate of Fenella (Hutchinson, 1892)
"Old Hoggen: A Mystery"	15 January 1893	Boston Herald	
"The Man from Shorrox"	February 1894	The Pall Mall Magazine (London)	
"When the Sky Rains Gold"	26 August and 2 September 1894	Lloyd's Weekly Newspaper (London)	
"The Red Stockade"	September 1894	The Cosmopolitan: An Illustrated Monthly Magazine (London)	
"At the Watter's Mou': Between Duty and Love"	November 1895	Current Literature: A Magazine of Record and Review, Vol. XVIII, No. 5. (New York)	Part of Chapter 2 of The Watter's Mou'
"Bengal Roses"	17 and 24 July 1898	Lloyd's Weekly Newspaper	
"A Baby Passenger"	9 February 1899	Lloyd's Weekly Newspaper	Alternate version of "Chin Music", from Snowbound
"A Young Widow"	26 March 1899	Lloyd's Weekly Newspaper	
"A Yellow Duster"	7 May 1899	Lloyd's Weekly Newspaper	
"Lucky Escapes of Sir Henry Irving"	1 May 1900	The St. Paul Globe	
"The Seer"	1902	The Mystery of the Sea (New York: Doubleday, Page & Co.)	Chapters 1 and 2 of The Mystery of the Sea
"The Bridal of Death"	1903	The Jewel of the Seven Stars (London: William Heinemann)	Alternate ending to The Jewel of Seven Stars
"A Widower's Grief"	October 1906	Personal Reminiscences of Henry Irving (London: William Heinemann)	Part of Chapter 39 of Personal Reminiscences of Henry Irving
"To the Rescue"	22 April 1908	The Westminster Gazette	
"The 'Eroes of the Thames"	October 1908	The Royal Magazine (London)	
"What They Confessed: A Low Comedian's Story"	27 December 1908	Lloyd's Weekly Newspaper	Alternate version of "In Fear of Death", from Snowbound
"The Way of Peace"	December 1909	Everybody's Story Magazine (London)	
"Greater Love"	October 1914	The London Magazine (London)	

=== Non-fiction ===
- The Duties of Clerks of Petty Sessions in Ireland (1879)
- A Glimpse of America (1886)
- Personal Reminiscences of Henry Irving (1906)
- Famous Impostors (1910)
- Great Ghost Stories (1998) (Compiled by Peter Glassman, Illustrated by Barry Moser)
- Bram Stoker's Notes for Dracula: A Facsimile Edition (2008) Bram Stoker Annotated and Transcribed by Robert Eighteen-Bisang and Elizabeth Miller, Foreword by Michael Barsanti. Jefferson, NC & London: McFarland. ISBN 978-0-7864-3410-7

=== Articles ===
- "Recollections of the Late W. G. Wills", The Graphic, 19 December 1891
- "The Art of Ellen Terry", The Playgoer, October 1901
- "The Question of a National Theatre", The Nineteenth Century and After, Vol. LXIII, January/June 1908
- "Mr. De Morgan's Habits of Work", The World's Work, Vol. XVI, May/October 1908
- "The Censorship of Fiction", The Nineteenth Century and After, Vol. LXIV, July/December 1908
- "The Censorship of Stage Plays", The Nineteenth Century and After, Vol. LXVI, July/December 1909
- "Irving and Stage Lighting", The Nineteenth Century and After, Vol. LXIX, January/June 1911

=== Critical works on Stoker ===
- Hughes, William, Beyond Dracula: Bram Stoker's Fiction and Its Cultural Context (Palgrave, 2000) ISBN 0-312-23136-9
- Belford, Barbara. Bram Stoker: A Biography of the Author of Dracula. London: Weidenfeld and Nicolson, 1996.
- Hopkins, Lisa. Bram Stoker: A Literary Life. Basingstoke, England: Palgrave Macmillan, 2007.
- Murray, Paul. From the Shadow of Dracula: A Life of Bram Stoker (London: Jonathan Cape, 2004)
- Senf, Carol. Science and Social Science in Bram Stoker's Fiction (Greenwood, 2002).
- Senf, Carol. Dracula: Between Tradition and Modernism (Twayne, 1998).
- Senf, Carol A. Bram Stoker (University of Wales Press, 2010).
- Shepherd, Mike. When Brave Men Shudder: the Scottish origins of Dracula (Wild Wolf Publishing, 2018).
- Subotsky, Fiona (2020). Dracula for Doctors: Medical Facts and Gothic Fantasies. Cambridge: Cambridge University Press. ISBN 978-1-911623-29-8.

== Sources ==
- Miller, Elizabeth, ed. (2005a). Bram Stoker's Dracula: A Documentary Volume (Dictionary of Literary Biography, Volume 304). Farmington Hills, Michigan: Thomson Gale. ISBN 0787668419.
- Skal, David J. (2016). Something in the Blood: The Untold Story of the Man Who Wrote Dracula. New York: Liveright. ISBN 9781631490118.
