= Under the Sunset =

Short story collection by Bram Stoker

- First edition
- Author: Bram Stoker
- Illustrator: W. FitzGerald; W. V. Cockburn
- Language: English
- Genre: Short storiesfantasy fiction
- Publisher: Sampson, Low, Marston, Searle & Rivington
- Publication date: 1881
- Publication place: United Kingdom
- Media type: Print (Hardback)
- Pages: 190

Under the Sunset is a collection of fantasy short stories by Bram Stoker first published in 1881. A children's book, it was illustrated by W. V. Cockburn and William FitzGerald, the younger brother of the Dublin physicist George Francis FitzGerald. The book was an early work before he achieved recognition with Dracula in 1897.

The collection was published in London in November 1881 by Sampson, Low, Marston, Searle & Rivington in a 190 page edition. In October 1882 the publishers released a 191 page second edition with 48 illustrations by the same artists.

Its significance in the development of fantasy literature was recognized by its republication in October 1978 by the Newcastle Publishing Company as the seventeenth volume of the celebrated Newcastle Forgotten Fantasy Library series.

== Stories ==
The eight stories in the collection are:

- "Under the Sunset" (A land where angels offer protection against The Children of the Dead)
- "The Rose Prince" (A story of a prince who battles a giant after his army fails)
- "The Invisible Giant" (A story about a giant who embodies the plague that a young girl warns about but which the town refuses to believe in until it is too late, the girl being the only one who can see it),
- "The Shadow Builder" (A tale about a character named Zaya and her son Knoal who attempt to overcome death)
- "How 7 Went Mad" (The story is about a young boy named Tineboy who has difficulty with the multiplication tables and wishes the number seven did not exist. When he falls asleep in the classroom, he dreams of a place where the number seven goes mad, disappears, and causes havoc)
- "Lies and Lilies" (A morality tale about Claribel, a young girl tempted into dishonesty by the devil. After daydreaming during schoolwork and lying about getting a math problem wrong, she experiences guilt and fears eternal damnation, learning the importance of telling the truth)
- "The Castle of the King" (The story is about a heartbroken, elderly poet who longs to be reunited with his deceased wife. After her death, he travels in a surreal landscape to reach the "Castle of the King of Death")
- "The Wondrous Child" (A story about two children, siblings Sibold and May, who are on a dreamy journey to ascertain where babies come from. They travel to a mysterious island of parsley and meet an angelic child)

The opening story reveals a fantasy realm or landscape ("Land Under the Sunset") which is protected by angels. The land becomes endangered when "Children of Death" seek entrance. They symbolize evil or nefarious forces. The tales offer lessons on gratitude and the resistance of corruption.

== Film adaptation ==
"The Shadow Builder" was adapted to film in 1998 as Shadow Builder directed by Jamie Dixon starring Michael Rooker and Leslie Hope.

== Sources ==
- Johnson, Alan. "The Stoker Canon." English Literature in Transition, 1880-1920 38.1 (1995): 102-105.
- Maunder, Andrew (December 2006). Bram Stoker. Writers and Their Work. UK: Liverpool University Press, Northcote House Publishers.
- Murray, Paul (November 2022). "Bram Stoker (1847-1912)". The Green Book: Writings on Irish Gothic, Supernatural and Fantastic Literature (20). Dublin: Swan River Press.
