= Dracula Society =

English literature and travel club

The Dracula Society
- Named after: Dracula
- Formation: 1973
- Founders: Bernard Davies; Bruce Wightman
- Location: London, England
- Main organ: Voices from the Vaults
- Website: The Dracula Society

The Dracula Society is a London-based literature and travel group with an interest in supernatural and macabre works of fiction, as exemplified by Bram Stoker's Dracula.

== The Society ==
The society was founded in October 1973 by two actors, Bernard Davies (1924–2010) and Bruce Wightman (1925-2009) to organize Dracula-themed tours of Transylvania and Czechoslovakia. Despite the name, its field of interest encompasses all Gothic literature, as well as stage and screen adaptations, and their sources in myth and folklore. The society meets regularly five times a year, but also organises occasional one-off events, and trips to locations in the UK and Europe.

== Awards ==
The Society presents two awards at its annual dinner, which is held in early November to mark Bram Stoker's birthday.

- The "Hamilton Deane Award" is presented for the best dramatic performance or presentation in the Gothic horror/supernatural genres during the previous year. Recent winners include: Mark Gatiss (2013) for his TV adaptation of M. R. James' The Tractate Middoth, Jane Goldman (2012) for her screenplay of the film The Woman in Black, and Benedict Cumberbatch (2011) for his performance in Danny Boyle's theatre production of Frankenstein.
- The "Children of the Night Award" is presented for the best piece of literature published in the Gothic (including horror or supernatural) genre - novel, short story, or biography - during the previous year. Recent winners include: Anna Taborska (2013) for her short story collection For Those Who Dream Monsters, Tim Powers (2012) for his novel Hide Me Among the Graves, and Reggie Oliver (2011) for his collection Mrs. Midnight, and Other Stories.

A third award, the Bernard Davies Award, was inaugurated in 2012, and is presented only occasionally, for achievement in scholarship. The first recipient was Dr. Elizabeth Miller, Professor (Emerita) of English of the Memorial University of Newfoundland, and president of the Canadian Chapter of the Transylvanian Society of Dracula.

== Journal ==
The society also publishes a quarterly journal Voices from the Vaults which contains reviews and articles of direct or related interest to members.

== Membership ==
As well as its regular membership the society also presents Honorary Life Memberships; current holders include Richard Dalby, Christopher Frayling, Jonathan Rigby, Janina Faye and Caroline Munro, and former holders include Michael Carreras, Radu Florescu, Raymond T. McNally and Vincent Price.
