= Robert Eighteen-Bisang =

Canadian author and scholar (1947–2020)

Robert Eighteen
- Born: 1947; Brantford, Ontario, Canada
- Died: 29 September 2020 (aged 72–73)
- Other name: Robert Eighteen-Bisang
- Education: University of British Columbia
- Occupations: Writer, scholar
- Known for: Writing, book collecting and bibliographic research, Transylvania Press
- Notable work: Bram Stoker's Notes for Dracula
- Partner: Matilda Bisang (1972 – his death)
- Awards: Lord Ruthven Award 2009

Robert Eighteen-Bisang (1947 – September 29, 2020) was a Canadian author and scholar who was one of the world's foremost authorities on vampire literature and mythology.

His book Bram Stoker's Notes for Dracula: A Facsimile Edition, which was written with Elizabeth Miller, won the Lord Ruthven Award. The "Ruthven," as it is often called, is awarded annually for the most outstanding work in vampire fiction or scholarship.

Other books by Eighteen-Bisang include Vampire Stories, which includes vampire stories by Arthur Conan Doyle: The Adventure of the Sussex Vampire, The Captain of the Polestar, John Barrrington Cowles, and The Parasite, along with The Adventure of the Illustrious Client – which Eighteen-Bisang claimed is a rationalized version of Dracula – and four more stories with tenuous connections to vampires. Publishers Weekly called the book "a stretch" and something "only completionists are likely to add this to their collections."

== Personal life ==
Eighteen-Bisang grew up in Toronto, Ontario as the son of a professional poker player. In university, he was a backgammon player and won four championships. Eighteen-Bisang aspired to be a university professor, but was talked out of the position by his professors themselves, believing the position would be too restrictive for him. After a career in marketing, Eighteen-Bisang gained an interest in vampire literature and started his research, collecting and writing. As an adult, Eighteen-Bisang still played in backgammon tournaments and was a member of the Vancouver Backgammon Club.

Eighteen-Bisang had amassed the largest collection of vampiric literature in the world, which he housed at his personal residence. The collection included about 2,500 books, 2,000 comic books, 1,000 magazines and over 100 films, including a first edition of Bram Stoker's Dracula.

== Academic involvement ==
Eighteen-Bisang is credited with proving that the novel Dracula is based on the infamous serial killer Jack the Ripper. He also discounted that Bram Stoker based his iconic character Dracula on Vlad the Impaler, as many people believe.

Eighteen-Bisang was a member of the American chapter of the Transylvanian Society of Dracula, led by president J. Gordon Melton, and was a member of the Canadian Academy of Independent Scholars. He founded Transylvania Press, a publishing company which "publishes high-quality vampiriana for collectors, libraries and fans."

He had been invited to lecture on vampires in Dallas, London, Los Angeles, Toronto, Vancouver, and Victoria. In 1997, he was guest of honor at Dracula ’97 in Los Angeles.

== Literature ==
=== As author ===
- Bram Stoker's Notes for Dracula: A Facsimile Edition by Bram Stoker, Eighteen-Bisang and Elizabeth Miller

=== As editor ===
- Vampire Stories Written by Arthur Conan Doyle
- Vintage Vampire Stories Co-edited with Richard Dalby

=== Referenced in ===
- Best New Horror, Volume 6
- Bram Stoker's Dracula: a documentary volume by Elizabeth Miller
- Bram Stoker's Notes for Dracula: An Annotated Transcription and Comprehensive Analysis by Michael Barsanti, Eighteen-Bisang and Elizabeth Miller
- Dracula in Visual Media: Film, Television, Comic Book and Electronic Game Appearances, 1921-2010 by John Edgar Browning and Caroline Joan (Kay) Picart
- The Complete Vampire Companion by Rosemary Guiley and J. B. Macabre
- The New Annotated Dracula by Bram Stoker
- Pulse of Darkness by Christopher Sequeira and Kurt Stone
- The Soul of an Angel by Chelsea Quinn Yarbro
- University Affairs
- Young Lusty Sluts by Michael Goss
- Powers of Darkness: The Lost Version of Dracula by Bram Stoker, Valdimar Ásmundsson, and Hans Corneel de Roos
