= Lord Ruthven Award =

Annual literary award for works on vampires

The Lord Ruthven Award is an annual award presented by the Lord Ruthven Assembly, a group of academic scholars specialising in vampire literature and affiliated with the International Association for the Fantastic in the Arts (IAFA).

The award is presented for the best fiction on vampires and the best academic work on the study of the vampire figure in culture and literature. The award is presented each March at the International Conference on the Fantastic in the Arts (ICFA) in Orlando. The award is named after Lord Ruthven, one of the first vampires in English literature.

== Lord Ruthven Award: Non-Fiction ==
- 1994: David J. Skal, The Monster Show: A Cultural History of Horror
- 1995: J. Gordon Melton, The Vampire Book: The Encyclopedia of the Undead
- 1996: Nina Auerbach, Our Vampires, Ourselves
- 1997: David J. Skal, V is for Vampire: An A to Z Guide to everything Undead
- 1998: Carol Margaret Davison & Paul Simpson-Housley, Eds., Bram Stoker's Dracula: Sucking Through the Century
- 1999: Carol A. Senf, Dracula: Between Tradition and Modernism
- 2001: Elizabeth Miller, Dracula: Sense and Nonsense
- 2002: Michael Bell, Food for the Dead: on the Trail of New England's Vampires
- 2003: William Patrick Day, Vampire Legends in Contemporary American Culture: What Becomes a Legend Most
- 2004: James B. South, Ed., Buffy the Vampire Slayer and Philosophy: Fear and Trembling in Sunnydale.
- 2005: Richard Dalby & William Hughes: Bram Stoker: A Bibliography
- 2006: Jorg Waltje, Blood Obsession: Vampires, Serial Murder, and the Popular Imagination.
- 2007: Bruce A. McClelland, Slayers and their Vampires: A Cultural History of Killing the Dead
- 2008: David Keyworth, Troublesome Corpses: Vampires and Revenants from Antiquity to the Present
- 2009: Elizabeth Miller & Robert Eighteen-Bisang, Eds., Bram Stoker's Notes for Dracula
- 2010: Mary Y. Hallab, Vampire God: The Allure of the Undead in Western Culture
- 2011: John Edgar Browning & Caroline Joan Picart, Dracula in Visual Media: Film, Television, Comic Book and Electronic Game Appearances
- 2012: Susannah Clements, The Vampire Defanged: How the Embodiment of Evil Became a Romantic Hero
- 2013: Jeffrey Weinstock, The Vampire Film: Undead Cinema
- 2014: Maria Lindgren Leavenworth & Malin Isaksson, Fanged Fan Fiction: Variations on Twilight, True Blood and The Vampire Diaries
- 2015: Margot Adler, Vampires Are Us: Understanding Our Love Affair with the Immortal Dark Side
- 2016: J. Gordon Melton & Alysa Hornick, The Vampire in Folklore, History, Literature, Film, and Television: A Comprehensive Bibliography
- 2017: David J. Skal, Something in the Blood: The Untold Story of Bram Stoker, the Man Who Wrote Dracula
- 2018: Gary A. Smith, Vampire Films of the 1970s
- 2019: Amy J. Ransom, I Am Legend as American Myth
- 2020: Sorcha Ni Fhlainn, Postmodern Vampires: Film, Fiction, and Popular Culture.
- 2021: Cait Coker, The Global Vampire: Essays on the Undead in Popular Culture Around the World.
- 2022: Simon Bacon, The Transmedia Vampire: Essays on Technological Convergence and the Undead. / Violet Fenn, A History of the Vampire in Popular Culture. Love at First Bite.
- 2023: Simon Bacon, Contagion and the Vampire: The Vampiric Body as Locus of Disease and Global Epidemics in the 21st Century.
- 2024: Simon Bacon (ed.), The Palgrave Handbook of the Vampire
- 2025: John Blair (ed.), Killing the Dead: Vampire Epidemics from Mesopotamia to the New World

== Lord Ruthven Award: Fiction ==
- 1989: Brian Stableford, The Empire of Fear
- 1990: Nancy A. Collins, Sunglasses After Dark
- 1993: Kim Newman, Anno Dracula
- 1996: Barbara Hambly, Traveling with the Dead
- 1997: Jonathan Nasaw, The World on Blood
- 1998: Chelsea Quinn Yarbro, Writ in Blood
- 1999: P. N. Elrod, The Vampire Files: A Chill in the Blood
- 2000: Terry Pratchett, Carpe Jugulum
- 2001: Elaine Bergstrom, Blood to Blood: The Dracula Story Continues
- 2002: Jean Lorrah, Blood Will Tell
- 2003: Charlaine Harris, Living Dead in Dallas
- 2004: Andrew Fox, Fat White Vampire Blues
- 2005: David Sosnowski, Vamped
- 2006: Elizabeth Kostova, The Historian
- 2007: Barbara Hambly, Renfield: Slave of Dracula
- 2008: Joel H. Emerson, The Undead
- 2009: James Reese, The Dracula Dossier
- 2010: Guillermo del Toro and Chuck Hogan, The Strain
- 2011: S. M. Stirling, A Taint in the Blood
- 2012: Glen Duncan, The Last Werewolf
- 2013: Tim Powers, Hide Me Among the Graves
- 2014: Joe Hill, NOS4A2
- 2015: Lauren Owen, The Quick
- 2016: David Gerrold, Jacob
- 2017: Anne Rice, Prince Lestat and the Realms of Atlantis
- 2018: Charlaine Harris: The Complete Sookie Stackhouse Stories
- 2019: Theodora Goss, European Travel for the Monstrous Gentlewoman
- 2020: Marge Simon & Bryan D. Dietrich, The Demeter Diaries
- 2021: Grady Hendrix, The Southern Book Club's Guide to Slaying Vampires
- 2022: Jessica Lévai, The Night Library of Sternendach: A Vampire Opera in Verse
- 2023: Jacqueline Holland, The God of Endings
- 2024: T. Kingfisher, What Feasts at Night
- 2025: Kat Dunn, Hungerstone

== Lord Ruthven Award: Media/Popular Culture ==
- 2003: Diary of a Virgin
- 2004: Dracula
- 2005: Vampire Dreams
- 2008: Anthony Bourdain, No Reservations: Romania
- 2009: True Blood
- 2011: Being Human
- 2015: Only Lovers Left Alive
- 2016: What We Do in the Shadows
- 2017: Vamped / The Vampire Historian
- 2018: Midnight, Texas Season 1
- 2020: What We Do in The Shadows
- 2022: Midnight Mass
- 2023: The Last Voyage of the Demeter
- 2024: Abigail / Nosferatu
- 2025: Sinners

== Lord Ruthven Special Award ==
- 1997: Raymond T. McNally
- 2018: Hans Corneel de Roos for his translation of, and research on Makt Myrkranna (Powers of Darkness)
