= Rusty (video game) =

1993 video game

- PC-98 cover art with the title character
- Developer: C-Lab
- Publisher: C-Lab
- Director: Naoto Niida
- Producer: Masayoshi Koyama
- Programmer: Naoto Niida
- Artist: Ringo Moribayashi
- Writer: Naoto Niida
- Composers: Masahiro Kajihara; Kenichi Arakawa; Ryu Takami
- Platforms: PC-98, MS-DOS
- Release: JP: July 1993
- Genre: Platform
- Mode: Single-player

Rusty (Note: Rusty (Japanese: ラスティ, Hepburn: Rasuti)) is an action video game developed and published by C-Lab in Japan in July 1993 for PC-98 and MS-DOS, with direction, writing and programming by Naoto Niida, production by Masayoshi Koyama, and music by Masahiro Kajihara, Kenichi Arakawa, and Ryu Takami.

The player plays as the vampire huntress Rusty who investigates the disappearance of a number of women, and travels through ten stages, fighting skeletons, monsters and boss characters with her whip and items. Critics and journalists frequently compared the game to the Castlevania series, some calling it a "clone", but still reviewed it favourably; Hardcore Gaming 101 called it a gem that everyone should play, and GamesVillage.it called it among the best game of all Castlevania clones. Although it was not published in English, it was unofficially translated by a ROM hacking group in 2017.

== Gameplay ==
The player uses their whip to attack enemies, and the large bosses that are encountered in each stage. Here, the player battles the Bungee Demon boss of stage 3, which is the manor house.

Rusty is a side-scrolling action game in which the player takes the role of Rustea "Rusty" Sprincul, a vampire huntress who together with her owl companion investigates a case of women who have disappeared from various villages in the countryside. The player fights against enemies such as skeletons, zombies, and many other monsters, as well as the large boss characters by using the player character's whip and items they find in the stages; additionally, the player's owl companion helps the player by attacking enemies for them. By jumping and attacking at the same time, the player can use the Mind Slasher - which is a "power crash" move that differs depending on what power-up they are currently using; these moves include slowing down time, shooting exploding energy balls, or becoming temporarily invulnerable. In addition to its use as a weapon, the player can also use the whip to swing from golden rings found in some of the stages.

The game consists of ten stages, of which eight are based around finding keys to unlock doors; the seventh stage involves quickly making one's way through the area, and the tenth is a boss-only stage. Stage designs are non-linear, with paths that loop around, and alternative routes with hidden rewards for the player to find. However, in contrast to the game's stage design, a timer is included. The stages include a village, a graveyard, a manor, a cathedral tower, a cavern, a water-filled labyrinth, a courtyard, a clocktower, and Bloodsoon Castle - itself divided into several stages. Every stage ends with a fight against one of the bosses.

== Plot ==
Many women have been abducted from various villages throughout a European countryside, and have been transformed by demon possession into hideous monsters, who are known as the Eight Fiends. Responsible for performing the sacrilegious act is Bloody Mary, a vampiress who is Queen of Bloodthorne Castle. Assisting her is a mysterious masked hunter named Gateau. Along with creating monsters, the two are also using the blood of women to resurrect the ancient vampire Monte Carlo, the Master of Bloodsoon Castle who has been deceased for 300 years. Being implored by the townspeople and the village elder, Rusty Springcul sets out to rescue the girls, and vanquish the evil terrifying the land.

== Development and release ==
The game was developed and released by C-Lab in July 1993 in Japan for PC-98 with MS-DOS. It was produced by Masayoshi Koyama and directed, programmed and written by Naoto Niida, and features music by Masahiro Kajihara, Kenichi Arakawa, and Ryu Takami. It was never released officially in English, but received an unofficial English translation patch in 2017, 24 years after its original release; the English version was developed by the ROM hacking group 46 OkuMen, who had formed to translate the game 46 Okunen Monogatari: The Shinkaron before going on to translate other Japanese games. Kotaku was impressed with the efforts to translate the game, and noted that it was unusual for games more than 20 years old to get translations.

A demo version of this game exists. The 5"2 HD floppy disk that came with the November 1993 issue of "Monthly I/O," a computer technology magazine published by Kogaku-sha, contained a demo of the game in which Stage 1 and Stage 2 could be played. At the beginning of this demo version, there is an illustration of Rusty and a monologue voice that is not included in the production version.

== Reception ==
The game was frequently compared to Konami's Castlevania series, to the point where Dracula in Visual Media authors John Edgar Browning and Caroline Joan S. Picart wrote that they think it is possible that there were connections to Konami during Rusty's development, but that it for some reason was not released as a Castlevania game. They also noted that the Castlevania title they thought it resembled the most – Rondo of Blood – was released three months after Rusty. John Szczepaniak, writing for Hardcore Gaming 101, said that despite several similarities, no connections between Konami and C-Lab had been proven, and considered it more of an homage with high production values than a cash-in.

Szczepaniak called the game a "hidden gem" that everyone should try, particularly fans of the Castlevania series. He praised its level design for using a structure where the level doubles back on itself, thus eliminating the feeling of backtracking and giving the game a sense of exploration in contrast to the linearity of the early Castlevania games. He noted that the game did not play well with a computer keyboard, recommending players to use a controller instead. Fabio D'Anna of GamesVillage.it called the game one of the best Castlevania clones, but questioned Rusty's character design, saying that she looked more like someone from a Japanese BDSM circle than a vampire hunter. Szczepaniak, while describing Rusty as a dominatrix archetype, did however say that the difference between her and Castlevania protagonists is that she is a "strong-willed sexy woman in tight leather" compared to Castlevania's "strong-willed muscle man in tight leather". He liked the enemy characters, calling them original and quirky, citing examples such as the spike beetle enemies and the naked, dragon-riding demon woman boss. He said that the visuals for the enemies and environments were well constructed despite the PC-98's graphical limitations, including good use of dithering to counteract the system's 16-color palette. He also liked the game's music, calling it consistently good and worthy of standing alongside Castlevania, with each stage having its own theme that makes the player excited.
