= Kelly Russell =

Kelly Russell may refer to:

- Kelly Russell (rugby union)
- Kelly Russell (musician)
