= John Edgar Browning =

American writer (born 1980)

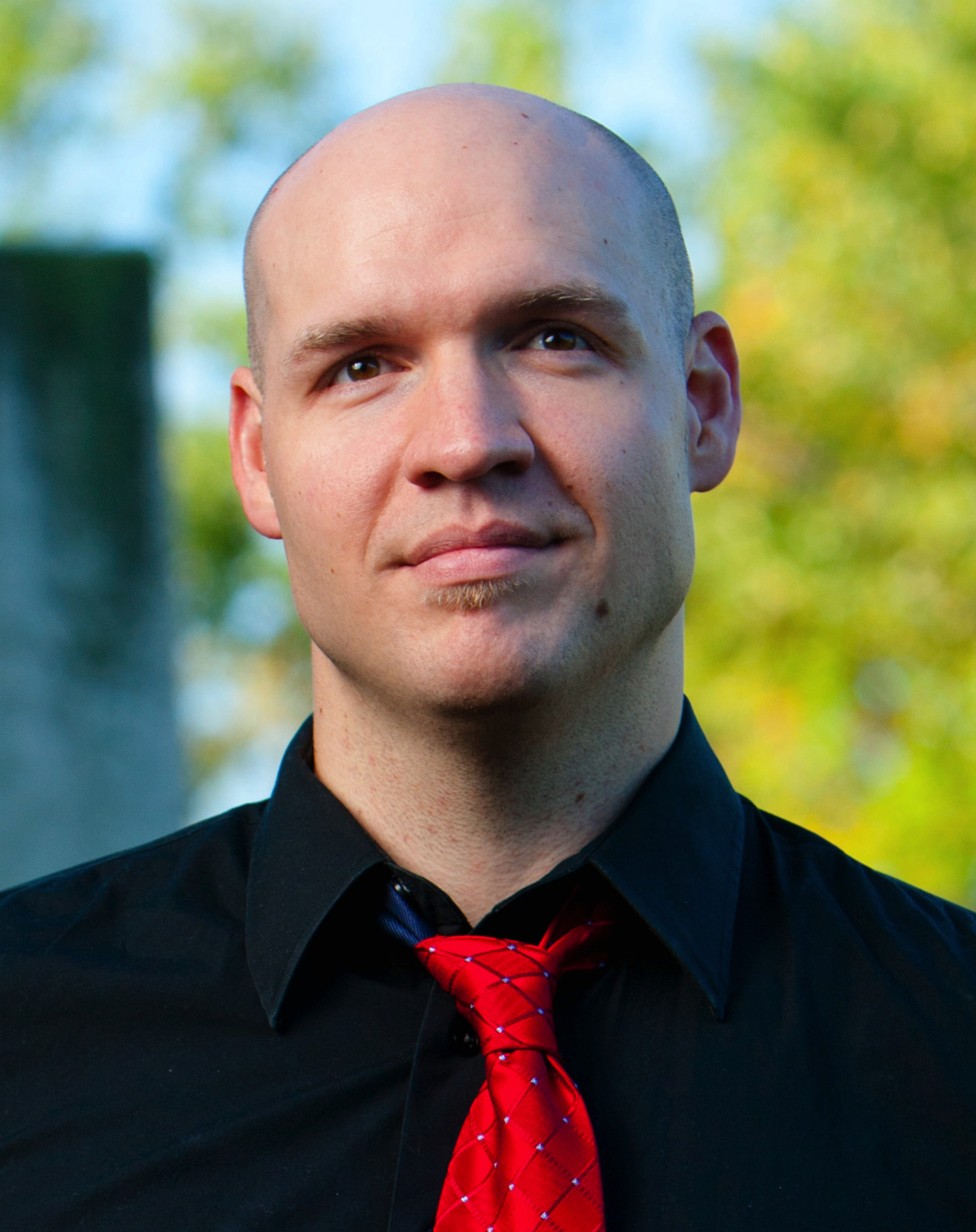
- Born: October 14, 1980 (age 45); Nashville, Tennessee, United States
- Education: Florida State University; University of Central Oklahoma; Louisiana State University; University at Buffalo
- Occupations: Writer, scholar, professor
- Writing career
- Language: English
- Years active: 2005–present
- Genre: Horror non-fiction
- Notable awards: Lord Ruthven Award (International Association for the Fantastic in the Arts)
- Website: johnedgarbrowning.academia.edu

John Edgar Browning (born October 14, 1980) is an American author, editor, and scholar known for his nonfiction works about the horror genre, Dracula, and vampires in film, literature, and culture. Previously on the faculty at the Georgia Institute of Technology and the Savannah College of Art and Design, he now teaches in the School of Cultural & Critical Studies and English department at Bowling Green State University.

Browning is considered an "expert on vampires specializing in the Dracula figure in film, literature, television, and popular culture". His works expound upon Dracula, horror, vampires, the supernatural, the un-dead, Bram Stoker, and gothic and cultural theory. Browning has appeared as an expert scholar on multiple documentary television series and consulted a number of other productions behind the scenes, including: National Geographic Channel's Taboo USA, Discovery Channel's William Shatner's Weird or What?, the seven-part AMC documentary series Eli Roth's History of Horror, Disney +'s The World According to Jeff Goldblum, as well as the History Channel's The UnXplained with William Shatner and History's Greatest Mysteries with Laurence Fishburne.

For his book Dracula in Visual Media, Browning documented over 700 "domestic and international Dracula films, television programs, documentaries, adult features, animations, and video games . . . [as well as] nearly 1000 domestic and international comic book titles and stage adaptations". For the book, Browning won the Lord Ruthven Award, an award for deserving work in vampire fiction or scholarship. The book was also nominated for the Rondo Hatton Classic Horror Award (often called the Rondo Award) for Book of the Year in 2011, as was his book The Vampire; or, Detective Brand's Greatest Case in 2023 for Best Classic Horror Fiction, co-edited with Gary D. Rhodes.

== Career ==
=== Education and teaching ===
Browning earned his B.A. from Florida State University and then his M.A. at the University of Central Oklahoma. He completed all his English doctoral coursework at Louisiana State University before transferring to American Studies at the University at Buffalo, The State University of New York (SUNY-Buffalo), where he studied under Michael H. Frisch, Bruce Jackson, Sarah Elder, and Donald A. Grinde, Jr.

At SUNY-Buffalo, Browning received an Arthur A. Schomburg Fellowship in the Department of Transnational Studies. While there, Browning continued his doctoral studies and served as an adjunct instructor in English. One of the courses Browning taught at SUNY-Buffalo was "A Cultural History of the Walking Dead," a fifteen-week course. The course drew on Richard Matheson's novel I Am Legend as well as the films of George A. Romero. While teaching at the Georgia Institute of Technology, Browning lectured on vampires, zombies, and monsters, as well as on Slasher cinema in a course entitled, "The Slasher Film: Gender, Disability, and Transgression."

=== Doctoral dissertation ===
For part of his doctoral dissertation, Browning conducted, over a period of two years, an ethnographic study of people who self-identify as vampire in New Orleans. Browning's fieldnotes recount the experience: "On the eve of the second Tuesday of every month, I have become, to the watchful bystander, a familiar presence in the French Quarter. Flying through the dusky sky over Bourbon Street, as I strolled along casually, were fast, sweeping brown bats: An homage, maybe, to the business of interviewing vampires? To my side hung the trusty brown leather satchel that housed my pen and paper, and digital voice recorder. I left politely at home, of course, the crucifix I didn't actually own, and the short wooden stake carved for me by an older brother when I was younger. For indeed the vampires with whom I was meeting tonight were not prisoners of lore and legend: theirs was a new lore, and they were becoming very quickly their own legend." Browning extended his ethnographic fieldwork to include real vampires living in Buffalo, NY.

For an op-ed in Deep South Magazine entitled Conversations with Real Vampires, Browning's notes further recount the experience: "We are meeting an hour later than usual for the third month in a row, because the sun, during the summer months, sets closer to 9 instead of 8. Tonight, I will ask for the first time if I can watch them feed." Browning has more recently elaborated on his experiences in Palgrave Communications, The Conversation UK, twice in Discover (magazine) and The Atlantic.

=== Professional affiliations ===
Browning sits on a number of editorial and advisory boards, including the Board of Advisors for The Blood Project (TBP) based out of Harvard Medical School, its members representing "leaders in their fields, including hematology, medical education, history of medicine, comparative and evolutionary medicine, art and medicine, literature in medicine, health literacy, and medical training in under-represented minorities". He also sits on the Editorial Advisory Panel for Humanities & Social Sciences Communications (a Springer Nature journal), previously called Palgrave Communications; the Advisory Board for Ethics International Press, founded in 1993 in Cambridge, UK to publish "academic books on Ethics and all related and associated topics" for "leading universities worldwide, the British Government, the European Commission, and to wholesalers, bookshops, libraries, agents, and individuals around the world"; the Editorial Board for the Journal of Positive Sexuality, a multidisciplinary publication "designed to be accessible and beneficial to a large and diverse readership, including academics, policymakers, clinicians, educators, and students"; the Advisory Board for the Series on Law, Culture and the Humanities, edited by Caroline Joan S. Picart and published by Fairleigh Dickinson University Press; as well as the Executive Advisory Committee for The Journal of Gods and Monsters, published through the Department of Philosophy at Texas State University.

== Bibliography ==
=== Books (authored) ===
- Dracula in Visual Media: Film, Television, Comic Book and Electronic Game Appearances, 1921-2010 as co-author with Caroline Joan S. Picart, afterword by Ian Holt, foreword by Dacre Stoker, introduction by David J. Skal, and contributions by J. Gordon Melton, Robert Eighteen-Bisang, Mitch Frye, Laura Helen Marks, and Dodd Alley
- Zombie Talk: Culture, History, Politics (Palgrave Pivot) as co-author with David R. Castillo, David Schmid, and David A. Reilly, afterword by William Egginton

=== Books (edited) ===
- Bram Stoker's Dracula: The Critical Feast, An Annotated Reference of Early Reviews & Reactions, 1897-1913 as editor with afterword by J. Gordon Melton
- Bram Stoker's Gibbet Hill and Other Lost Writings: An Anthology as co-editor with Paul S. McAlduff
- Dracula (Norton Critical Editions) as co-editor with David J. Skal
- Draculas, Vampires, and Other Undead Forms: Essays on Gender, Race, and Culture as co-editor with Caroline Joan S. Picart, foreword by David J. Skal
- The Fantastic in Holocaust Literature and Film: Critical Perspectives (Critical Explorations in Science Fiction and Fantasy) as co-editor with Judith B. Kerman, foreword by Jane Yolen
- The Forgotten Writings of Bram Stoker as editor with foreword by Elizabeth Miller and afterword by Dacre Stoker
- Graphic Horror: Movie Monster Memories as editor with foreword by David J. Skal and afterword by Chelsea Quinn Yarbro
- The King in Yellow as editor with author Robert W. Chambers
- The King in Yellow (Clockworks Edition), 2nd ed. as editor with author Robert W. Chambers
- New Queer Horror Film and Television (Horror Studies) as co-editor with Darren Elliott-Smith
- Old Hoggen and Other Adventures as co-editor with Brian J. Showers and author Bram Stoker
- A Quarter Century of Student Life at Tulane: A Dean's Narrative History, 1949-1975 as editor with author John H. Stibbs
- Speaking of Monsters: A Teratological Anthology as co-editor with Caroline Joan S. Picart
- The Vampire, His Kith and Kin: A Critical Edition as editor with author Montague Summers
- The Vampire in Europe: A Critical Edition as editor with author Montague Summers
- The Vampire; or, Detective Brand's Greatest Case as co-editor with Gary D. Rhodes

=== Essays (published in journals, anthologies, and professional magazines and blogs) ===
- Animal Horror Cinema: Genre, History and Criticism as a contributor with editors Katarina Gregersdotter, Johan Höglund, and Nicklas Hållén
- Asian Gothic: Essays on Literature, Film and Anime as a contributor with editor Andrew Hock Soon Ng
- The Atlantic
- B-Movie Gothic: International Perspectives as a contributor with editors Justin D. Edwards and Johan Höglund
- A Companion to the Horror Film as a contributor with editor Harry M. Benshoff
- The Conversation UK
- The Criminal Humanities: An Introduction (Criminal Humanities & Forensic Semiotics) as a contributor with editors Michael Andrew Arntfield and Marcel Danesi
- Dead Reckonings: Review of Horror Literature (journal)
- Dracula: An International Perspective (Palgrave Gothic) as a contributor with editor Marius-Mircea Crisan
- Encyclopedia of American Studies as a contributor with editor Simon J. Bronner
- Encyclopedia of the Vampire: The Living Dead in Myth, Legend, and Popular Culture as a contributor with editor S. T. Joshi
- Encyclopedia of the Zombie: The Walking Dead in Popular Culture and Myth as a contributor with editors June Pulliam and Anthony J. Fonesca
- McAlduff, Paul S.; Browning, John Edgar (2014). "Bram Stoker's 'Lost' Sketch: 'To the Rescue'". English Literature in Transition, 1880-1920. 57 (3): 299–308. Project MUSE 546595.
- The Evolution of Horror in the Twenty-First Century as a contributor with editor Simon Bacon
- Fear and Learning: Essays on the Pedagogy of Horror as a contributor with editors Sean Moreland and Aalya Ahmad
- Film International
- Ghosts in Popular Culture and Legend as contributor with editors June Michele Pulliam and Anthony J. Fonseca
- McAlduff, Paul S.; Browning, John Edgar (November 2016). "Bram Stoker's Oeuvre and 'Other Knowledges': The 'Lost' Book Review of Norman Macrae's Highland Second-Sight (1909)". Gothic Studies. 18 (2): 86–95. doi:10.7227/GS.0010.
- Browning, John Edgar; Skal, David J. (2015). "Something in His Blood: An Interview with David J. Skal". The Green Book: Writings on Irish Gothic, Supernatural and Fantastic Literature (6): 74–83. JSTOR 48536092.
- Horror Literature through History: An Encyclopedia of the Stories That Speak to Our Deepest Fears as a contributor with editor Matt Cardin
- Browning, John Edgar (June 2011). "Survival horrors, survival spaces: Tracing the modern zombie (cine)myth". Horror Studies. 2 (1): 41–59. doi:10.1386/host.2.1.41_1.
- Huffington Post
- Browning, John Edgar (2 December 2015). "Monster culture in the 21st century: a reader". Information, Communication & Society. 18 (12): 1455–1456. doi:10.1080/1369118X.2014.987153. S2CID 143737007.
- Monsters: A Companion (Genre Fiction and Film Companions) as a contributor with editor Simon Bacon
- Monsters, Law, Crime: Explorations in Gothic Criminology as a contributor with editor Caroline Joan S. Picart
- Monstrous Children and Childish Monsters: Essays on Cinema's Holy Terrors as a contributor with editors Markus Bohlmann and Sean Moreland
- Nyx in the House of Night: Mythology, Folklore and Religion in the PC and Kristin Cast Vampyre Series as a contributor with editor P. C. Cast
- Browning, John Edgar (24 March 2015). "The real vampires of New Orleans and Buffalo: a research note towards comparative ethnography". Palgrave Communications. 1 (1). doi:10.1057/palcomms.2015.6. S2CID 144976532.
- Browning, John Edgar (2012). "Review of Gothicka: Vampire Heroes, Human Gods, and the New Supernatural". Religion & Literature. 44 (3): 277–279. JSTOR 24397771.
- Routledge Companion to Death and Dying (Routledge Religion Companions) as contributor with editor Christopher Moreman
- Studies in the Fantastic (No. 2) (journal) as a contributor with editor S.T. Joshi
- Supernatural and Philosophy: Metaphysics and Monsters... for Idjits as a contributor with editor Galen A. Foresman and series editor William Irwin
- The Tale of the Living Vampyre: New Directions in Vampire Studies as a contributor with author Kevin Dodd
- The Transmedia Vampire: Technological Convergence and the Undead World of the Vampire as a contributor with editor Simon Bacon
- Undead in the West II: They Just Keep Coming as a contributor with editors Cynthia J. Miller and A. Bowdoin Van Riper
- Browning, John Edgar; Stoker, Bram (2013). "'Dracula's' Bram Stoker: 'The Wrongs of Grosvenor Square,' 'Bengal Roses,' and Other Lost Periodical Writings". Victorian Literature and Culture. 41 (2): 391–407. doi:10.1017/S1060150312000472. JSTOR 24575706. S2CID 162472497.
- The Zombie Film: From White Zombie to World War Z as a contributor with authors Alain Silver and James Ursini

== Filmography ==
- Самые Шокирующие Гипотезы ("The Most Shocking Hypotheses") (2020)
- AMC Visionaries: Eli Roth's History of Horror (2018)
- Taboo USA (2013), formerly Taboo
- Тайны Чапман ("Chapman's Secrets") (2022)
- The UnXplained (2020)
- William Shatner's Weird or What? (2012)
- The World According to Jeff Goldblum (2021)
- Центральное телевидение ("Central Television," NTV (Russia)) (3 June 2023)
