= Ted Russell (Canadian politician) =

Canadian writer (1904–1977)

Ted Russell MHA

Member of the Newfoundland House of Assembly for Bonavista South
- In office 27 May 1949 – 26 November 1951
- Preceded by: Herman Quinton (pre-Confederation)
- Succeeded by: Clyde Brown

Minister of Natural Resources
- In office July 29, 1949 – December 27, 1951
- Preceded by: William Keough
- Succeeded by: Joey Smallwood

Personal details
- Born: June 27, 1904 Coley's Point, Newfoundland
- Died: October 16, 1977 (aged 73) St. John's, Newfoundland, Canada
- Party: Liberal
- Spouse: Dora Oake (m. 1935)
- Children: 5, including Elizabeth Russell Miller and Kelly Russell
- Education: Bishop Feild College
- Profession: Teacher, radio show writer

Edward "Ted" Russell (June 27, 1904 – October 16, 1977) was a Newfoundlander and Canadian writer, teacher, and politician.

== Biography ==
The son of Edward Russell and Sarah Jane Kelly, he was born in Coley's Point, Conception Bay, Colony of Newfoundland. Russell was educated there and at Bishop Feild College. He started work as a teacher immediately after completing high school at the age of 16. After teaching in several small Newfoundland communities during the 1920s and 1930s, interspersed with stints at Memorial University College, he became a magistrate. In 1943 he became head of the government division responsible for promoting co-operatives throughout Newfoundland.

After 1949, when Newfoundland joined Canada, Russell entered politics and served for two years in Joey Smallwood's cabinet as Minister of Natural Resources, but, opposing Smallwood's industrial policies, resigned from cabinet and left politics shortly thereafter. For several years he worked as an insurance salesman, later returning to teaching at the high school and then at Memorial University of Newfoundland.

Despite having done little previous creative writing, from 1954 to 1961, Russell wrote and narrated (on CBC Radio) stories set in a fictional Newfoundland outport, Pigeon Inlet, using the persona of "Uncle Mose". These stories featured a colourful cast of characters and were told from a generally positive and optimistic, yet realistic, point of view. Many featured tall tales, but some were based on Russell's own experiences in rural Newfoundland. In addition to providing entertainment, these stories commented on issues of the day and also provided practical information to a population just beginning to deal with a profound change in its system of government.

Two volumes of these stories were published in the 1970s, and three more in the 1980s. Russell is also the author of several radio plays, the most successful of which was The Holdin' Ground, which was adapted into a television play and continues to air irregularly on Newfoundland television station NTV as part of its "Captain Atlantis" anthology series.

Two albums were released after his death. Both were made up of stories taken from his CBC Radio programs.

In 2011, he was designated a "Person of Provincial Significance".

== Personal life ==
Russell and his wife Dora (Oake), whom he married in 1935, had five children, among them Elizabeth Miller, a scholar and academic famous for her work on Bram Stoker's Dracula and Vlad the Impaler, and Kelly Russell, a well-known Newfoundland musician.

== Bibliography ==
- The Holdin' Ground: a radio play (McClelland & Stewart, 1972)
- The Chronicles of Uncle Mose, ed. Elizabeth Miller (Breakwater Books, 1975; Flanker Press, 2006)
- Tales from Pigeon Inlet, ed. Elizabeth Miller (Breakwater Books, 1977)
- The Best of Ted Russell, Number 1, ed. Elizabeth Miller (Harry Cuff Publications, 1982)
- Stories from Uncle Mose, ed. Elizabeth Miller (Harry Cuff Publications, 1983)
- A Fresh Breeze from Pigeon Inlet, ed. Elizabeth Miller (Harry Cuff Publications, 1988)

== Discography ==
- The Chronicles of Uncle Mose (Pigeon Inlet Productions, 1979)
- Uncle Mose from Pigeon Inlet (Pigeon Inlet Productions, 1981)
