= Dora Oake Russell =

Canadian writer and educator

- Born: Dora Oake; March 7, 1912; Change Islands, Newfoundland
- Died: February 9, 1986 (aged 73); St. John's, Newfoundland, Canada
- Spouse: Ted Russell (m. 1935; died 1977)
- Children: 5, including Elizabeth Russell Miller and Kelly Russell

Dora Oake Russell (March 7, 1912 – February 9, 1986) was a Newfoundlander and Canadian writer and educator.

== Life ==
The daughter of Jesse Oake and Laura Brinson, she was born Dora Oake at Change Islands. She was educated there and at Bishop Spencer College. She completed a teacher training course and began teaching in St. John's in 1933.

She married Ted Russell in January 1935. The couple moved to Springdale later that year. In 1939, they moved to Harbour Breton and then lived in Bonne Bay from 1940 until 1943, when they moved back to St. John's. Later that year, she became the first women's editor of The Evening Telegram. She retired from the newspaper in 1949. During the 1950s, she was women's editor for The Daily News. She later wrote a weekly column for The Evening Telegram during the 1960s.

Besides writing for newspapers, she also wrote short fiction, plays for radio and television and a book Day by Day: Pages from the Diary of a Newfoundland Woman, published in 1983.

Russell was a founding member of the St. John's Centre branch of the Royal Astronomical Society and was also a leader in the Girl Guides of Canada; she is credited with helping to create the astronomy badge for Girl Guides and establishing its criteria.

Dora and her husband had five children, including Elizabeth (Russell) Miller and Kelly Russell, a popular Newfoundland musician.
