= Dracula =

1897 novel by Bram Stoker

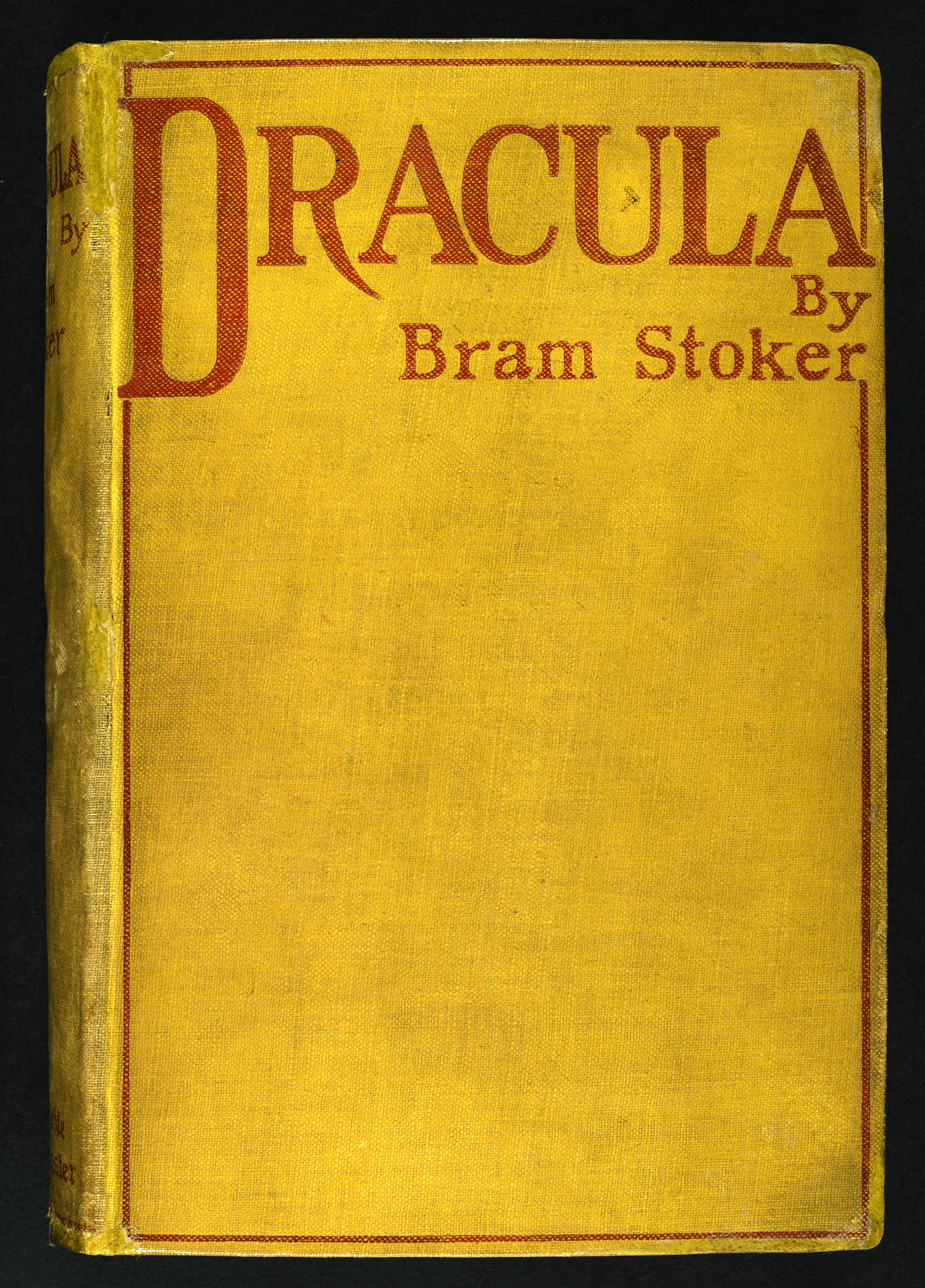
- First edition cloth cover (1897)
- Author: Bram Stoker
- Language: English
- Genre: Gothic; Horror
- Publisher: Archibald Constable and Company (UK)
- Publication date: May 1897
- Publication place: United Kingdom
- OCLC: 1447002
- Text: Dracula at Wikisource

Dracula is an 1897 Gothic horror novel by Irish author Bram Stoker. The narrative is related through letters, diary entries, and newspaper articles. It has no single protagonist and opens with English solicitor Jonathan Harker taking a business trip to stay at the castle of a Transylvanian nobleman, Count Dracula. Revealing his true nature as a vampire, Dracula moves to England and plagues the seaside town of Whitby. Harker joins a group led by Abraham Van Helsing who hunt and kill the Count.

The novel was mostly written in the 1890s, and Stoker produced over a hundred pages of notes, drawing extensively from folklore and history. Scholars have suggested various figures as the inspiration for Dracula, including the Wallachian prince Vlad the Impaler and the Countess Elizabeth Báthory, but recent scholarship suggests otherwise. He found the name "Dracula" in a history of Wallachia and Moldavia, selecting it because he thought it meant 'devil' in Romanian.

Following the novel's publication in May 1897, some reviewers praised its terrifying atmosphere while others thought Stoker included too much horror. Many noted a structural similarity with Wilkie Collins' The Woman in White (1859) and a resemblance to the work of Gothic novelist Ann Radcliffe. In the 20th century, Dracula became regarded by critics as a seminal work of Gothic fiction. Scholars explore the novel within the historical context of the Victorian era and regularly discuss its portrayal of race, religion, gender and sexuality.

Dracula is one of the most famous works of English literature and has been called the centrepiece of vampire fiction. In the mid-20th century, publishers and film-makers realised Stoker incorrectly filed the novel's copyright in the United States, making its story and characters public domain there. Consequently, the novel has been adapted many times. Count Dracula has deeply influenced the popular conception of vampires; with over 700 appearances across virtually all forms of media, the Guinness Book of World Records named Dracula the most portrayed literary character.

== Plot ==
Jonathan Harker, a newly qualified English solicitor, visits Count Dracula at his castle in the Carpathian Mountains to help the Count purchase a house near London. Ignoring the Count's warning, Harker wanders the castle at night and encounters three vampire women; Dracula intervenes and gives the women a bag containing a kidnapped child. Six weeks later, Dracula leaves the castle, abandoning Harker to the women. Harker, having realised Dracula's true nature, escapes and ends up delirious in a Budapest hospital. Dracula takes the ship Demeter for England with boxes of earth from his castle. The captain's log narrates the crew's disappearance, until only he remains. When the ship runs aground at Whitby, a large dog is seen leaping ashore and the captain's corpse is found tied to the helm.

Lucy Westenra's letter to her best friend, Harker's fiancée Mina Murray, describes her marriage proposals from Dr John Seward, Quincey Morris, and Arthur Holmwood. Lucy accepts Holmwood's, but all remain friends. Mina joins Lucy on holiday in Whitby. Lucy begins to sleepwalk, unaware that the Count is influencing her mind. Mina receives a letter about her missing fiancé's illness and goes to Budapest to nurse him. Lucy becomes very ill; Seward's old teacher — Professor Abraham Van Helsing — determines the nature of her condition, but he refuses to disclose it, instead diagnosing it as acute blood-loss.

Lucy is given fresh blood and placed in a room filled with garlic flowers. Unaware that vampires cannot tolerate garlic, her mother removes the flowers. While Seward and Van Helsing are absent, Lucy and her mother are confronted by a wolf, causing her mother to die of a heart attack. Lucy dies shortly thereafter. After her burial, newspapers report children being stalked in the night by a "bloofer lady" (beautiful lady), and Van Helsing deduces it is Lucy. Seward, Morris, Holmwood, and Van Helsing go to her tomb and see that she is a vampire. They stake her heart, behead her, and fill her mouth with garlic. Harker and his new bride Mina return and join the campaign against Dracula.

The group move to Seward's asylum, and Van Helsing explains that they must destroy the boxes of earth to weaken Dracula's power. Dracula communicates with Seward's patient, Renfield, an insane man who eats vermin to absorb their life force. After Dracula learns of the group's plot against him, he uses Renfield to enter the asylum. He secretly attacks Mina three times, drinking her blood before forcing her to drink his on the final visit, thereby cursing her to become a vampire after death. The men discover that Dracula has distributed his boxes of earth around various properties in London. After sterilizing most of the boxes, the group fail to trap the Count in his Piccadilly house and learns that Dracula is fleeing to his castle in Transylvania with his last box. Using hypnosis, Van Helsing exploits Mina's faint psychic connection to Dracula to track his movements and they pursue, guided by Mina.

In Galatz, Romania, the hunters split up. Van Helsing and Mina go to Dracula's castle, where the professor destroys the vampire women. Harker and Holmwood pursue Dracula's boat on the river, while Morris and Seward follow them on land. Dracula's box is loaded onto a wagon by Romani men; the hunters attack and rout the Romani. Harker decapitates Dracula as Morris stabs him in the heart. Dracula crumbles to dust, freeing Mina from her vampiric curse. Morris is mortally wounded in the fight against the Romani. He dies, at peace knowing that Mina is saved. A note by Jonathan Harker seven years later states that the Harkers have a son, named Quincey after their friend.

== Background ==
=== Author ===
Bram Stoker was born in Clontarf, Dublin on 8 November 1847 as the third of seven children. A sickly child, he was homeschooled before attending a private day school. Stoker attended Trinity College Dublin in the 1860s and began writing theatre reviews in the early 1870s. After Stoker wrote a review of a performance by stage actor Henry Irving, the two became friends. In 1878, Irving offered Stoker a job as the business manager of London's Lyceum Theatre, which he accepted. He married Florence Balcombe later that year. Biographer Lisa Hopkins notes that this role required Stoker to be sociable and introduced him to the elites of Victorian London. Nonetheless, Stoker described himself as a private person who closely guarded his thoughts.

Stoker supplemented his theatre income by writing romance and sensation novels, but was more closely identified during his lifetime with the theatre than he was with the literary world. By the time of his death in 1912, he had published 18 books. Dracula was his seventh published book, following The Shoulder of Shasta (1895) and preceding Miss Betty (1898). Stoker's great-nephew, Daniel Farson, wrote that Stoker may have died from syphilis, but this is widely disputed by scholars. (Note: Stoker's great-nephew provided Bram's death certificate to his general practitioner, who said the cause of death and medical language used was consistent with syphilis. Miller and scholar Robert Eighteen-Bisang said that the language was inconclusive. The syphilis theory was rejected by Stoker scholars Leslie Shepard and William Hughes and by Stoker's descendant, Ivan Stoker Dixon.) Novelist and playwright Hall Caine, a close friend of Stoker's, (Note: Dracula is dedicated to Caine using his nickname: "To my dear friend Hommy Beg".) wrote in Stoker's obituary in The Daily Telegraph that—besides his biography on Irving—Stoker wrote only "to sell" and "had no higher aims".

=== Inspiration ===
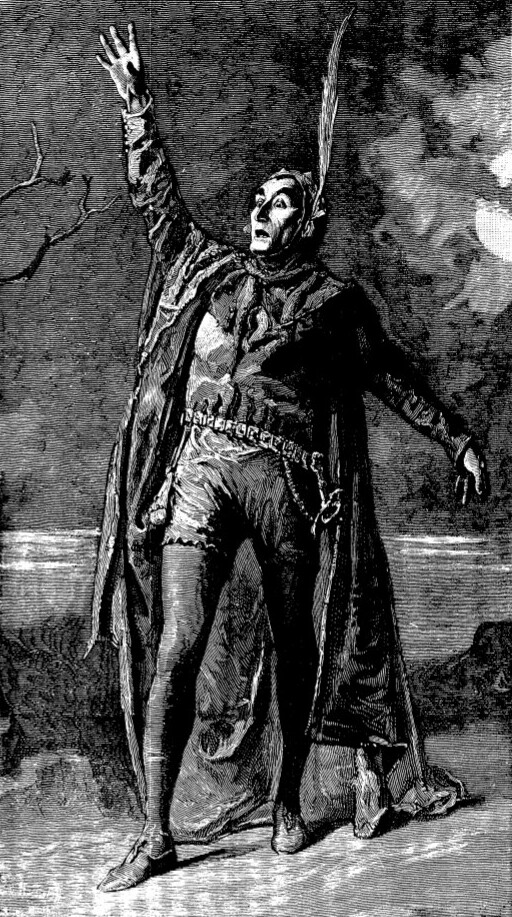
Henry Irving is widely considered to have inspired Dracula.

Folkloric vampires predate Stoker's Dracula by hundreds of years. Stoker adopted some characteristics of folkloric vampires for his own, such as their aversion to garlic and staking as a means of killing them. He invented other attributes—for example, Stoker's vampires must be invited into one's home, sleep on earth from their homeland and have no reflection in mirrors. Sunlight is not fatal to Dracula in the novel—this was an invention of the unauthorised Dracula film Nosferatu (1922)—but it does weaken him. Some of Stoker's inventions applied unrelated lore to vampires for the first time; for example, Dracula has no reflection because of a folkloric concept that mirrors show the human soul. Some Irish scholars have suggested Irish folklore as an inspiration for the novel, for example the revenant Abhartach, and the 11th-century High King of Ireland Brian Boru. (Note: Jarlath Killeen disparages an "endlessly repeated" and "extremely unlikely" claim that Dracula's name was inspired by droch fhola, an Irish phrase meaning 'bad blood'.) Dracula scholar Elizabeth Miller notes that in his childhood Stoker was exposed to supernatural tales and Irish oral history involving premature burials and staked bodies.

Count Dracula has literary progenitors. John William Polidori's "The Vampyre" (1819) includes an aristocratic vampire with powers of seduction. The lesbian vampire of Sheridan Le Fanu's Carmilla (1872) can transform into a cat, as Dracula can transform into a dog. Dracula resembles earlier Gothic villains in appearance, with Miller comparing him to the villains of Ann Radcliffe's The Italian (1796) and Matthew Gregory Lewis's The Monk (1796).

There is almost unanimous consensus that Dracula was inspired, in part, by Henry Irving. Scholars note the Count's tall and lean physique and aquiline nose, with Dracula scholar William Hughes specifically citing the influence of Irving's performance as Shylock in a Lyceum Theatre production of The Merchant of Venice. Stoker's contemporaries remarked upon the similarity. Stoker had praised a performance of Irving as "a wonderful impression of a dead man fictitiously alive [with eyes like] cinders of glowing red from out the marble face". Louis S. Warren writes that Dracula was founded on "the fear and animosity his employer inspired in him". (Note: Warren replicates an argument by Barbara Belford, writing that Irving was "a self-absorbed and profoundly manipulative man" who "[cultivated] rivalries between his followers", and made Stoker jealous by turning "his gaze to other men, as he did by 1885".) Miller contests this, describing Stoker's attitude towards him as "adulation".

Historical figures have been suggested as inspirations for Count Dracula but there is no consensus. In a 1972 book, Raymond T. McNally and Radu Florescu popularised the idea that Ármin Vámbéry supplied Stoker with information about Vlad Dracula, commonly known as Vlad the Impaler. (Note: There is a reference to Vámbéry in the novel, an "Arminius, of Buda-Pesh University", who is familiar with the historical Vlad III and is a friend of Abraham Van Helsing.) Their investigation, however, found nothing about "Vlad, Dracula, or vampires" within Vámbéry's published papers, nor in Stoker's notes about their meeting. Miller calls the link to Vlad III "tenuous", indicating that Stoker incorporated a large amount of "insignificant detail" from his research, and rhetorically asking why he would omit Vlad III's infamous cruelty. (Note: Miller presented this article at the second Transylvanian Society of Dracula Symposium, but it has been reproduced elsewhere; for example, in the Dictionary of Literary Biography in 2005.) McNally additionally suggested in 1983 that the crimes of Elizabeth Báthory inspired Stoker. (Note: Bathory's crimes might have been exaggerated by her political opponents, as very little is known about her life.) A book used by Stoker for research, The Book of Were-Wolves by Sabine Baring-Gould, does contain some information on Báthory, but Stoker never took notes from the short section devoted to her. Miller and her co-author Robert Eighteen-Bisang concur that there is no evidence Báthory inspired Stoker. (Note: In 2000, Miller's book-length study, Dracula: Sense and Nonsense, was said by academic Noel Chevalier to correct "not only leading Dracula scholars, but non-specialists and popular film and television documentaries".) (Note: Other critics have concurred with Miller. Mathias Clasen describes her as "a tireless debunker of academic Dracula myths". In response to several lines of query as to the historical origin of Dracula, Benjamin H. Leblanc reproduces her arguments in his critical history on the novel.)

== Textual history ==
=== Composition ===
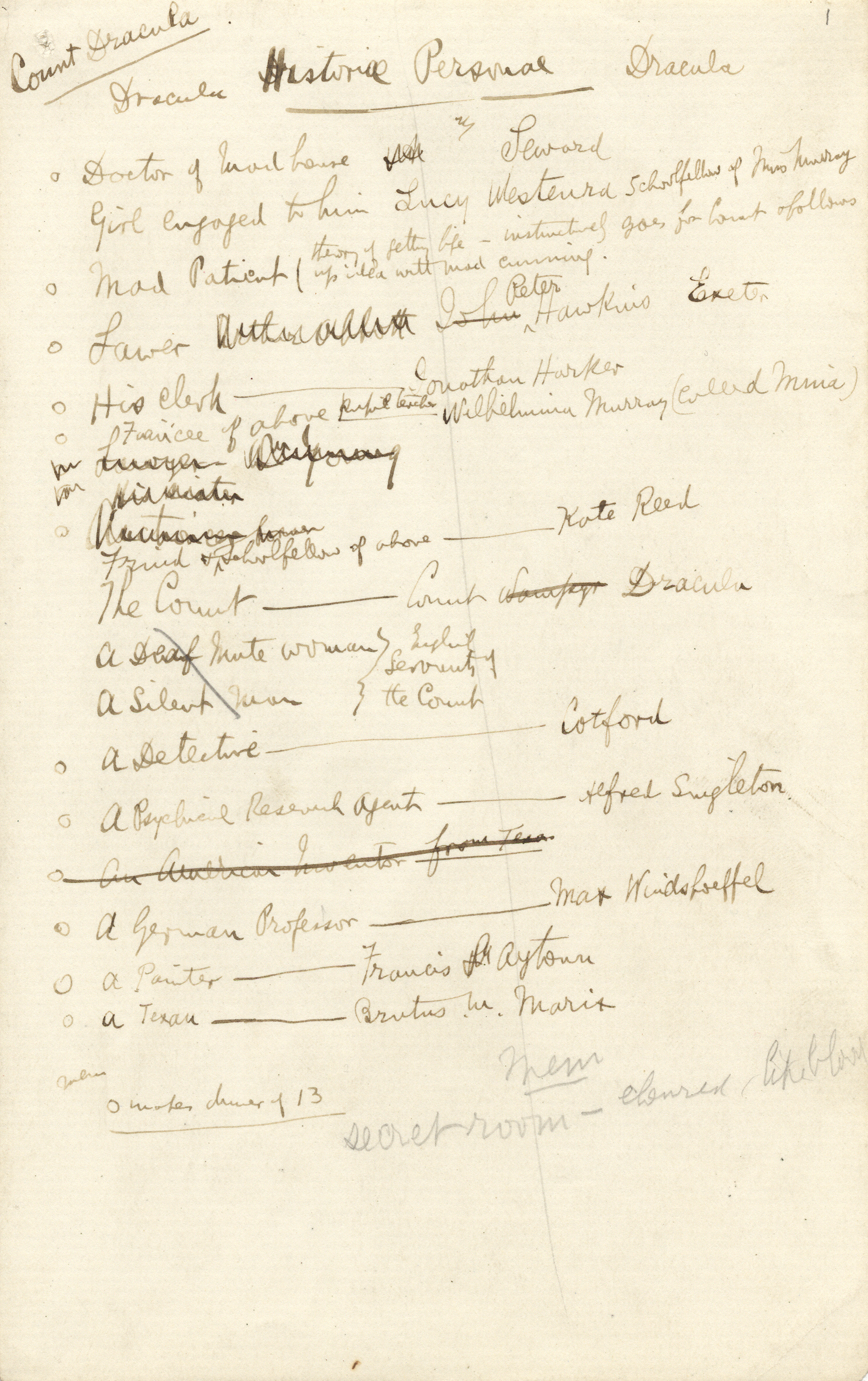
Handwritten notes about the novel's characters

Prior to writing the novel, Stoker researched extensively, assembling over 100 pages of notes, including chapter summaries and plot outlines. (Note: The notes were sold by Bram Stoker's widow, Florence, in 1913, to a New York book dealer for £2. 2s, (equivalent to UK£164 in 2019). Following that, the notes became the property of Charles Scribner's Sons, and then disappeared until they were bought by the Rosenbach Museum and Library in Philadelphia in 1970. For a list of works that use Stoker's notes, see Dracula#Studies on Dracula's notes.) Stoker undertook some of his research at a library at Whitby in the summer of 1890 but most was done at the London Library. The earliest dated notes are from 8 March 1890, comprising an outline of the novel's opening. Joseph S. Beirman notes that it differs from the final novel "in only a few details": The Count and Harker are not given names. The word vampire is not used explicitly, but it depicts the Count's possessive fury over Harker and a female who attempts "to kiss him not on lips but throat". In February 1892, Stoker wrote a 27-chapter outline of the novel; according to Miller, "all the key pieces of the jigsaw were in place".

Stoker's notes reveal other scrapped concepts. Joseph S. Bierman says that Stoker always intended to write an epistolary novel but originally set it in Styria instead of Transylvania. Other concepts from the notes include a German professor called Max Windshoeffel confronting a "Count Wampyr" and one of the vampire hunters would have been slain by a werewolf. (Note: In their annotated version of Stoker's notes, Eighteen-Bisang and Miller dedicated an appendix to what the novel might have looked like had Stoker adhered to his original concept.) Stoker biographer Barbara Belford notes evidence that Stoker intended to write a detective story, with a detective called Cotford and a psychical investigator called Singleton.

Stoker took the name Dracula from William Wilkinson's history of Wallachia and Moldavia (1820). (Note: Prior to 2018, scholars believed Stoker probably consulted Wilkinson's book in Whitby's public library while holidaying there in 1890. However, recent research shows that Stoker also had access to the book in the British Library and London Library.) Stoker copied the following footnote from the book: "Dracula means devil. Wallachians were accustomed to give it as a surname to any person who rendered himself conspicuous by courage, cruel actions or cunning". (Note: In fact, "Dracula" means "son of the devil.")

Stoker stated that it took him about three years to write the novel, and it is likely that he wrote most of the manuscript during his summer holidays in Cruden Bay, Scotland from 1893 to 1896. Stoker generally wrote in spare time from his duties as Irving's business manager, and the long gestation of the novel is indicative of the importance he placed on it.

=== Publication ===
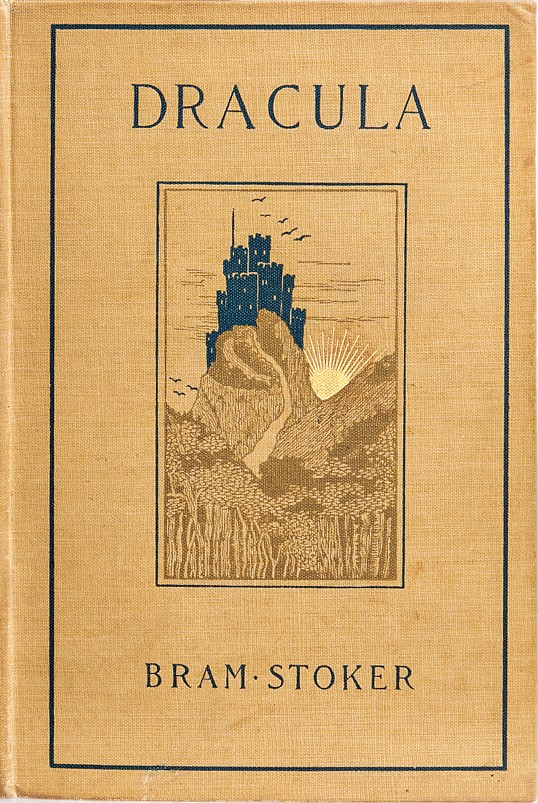
1899 first American edition, Doubleday & McClure, New York

Early Stoker biographer Barbara Belford noted the novel looked "shabby" because of a last-minute title change; the printer's copy of the typescript, with hand-written amendments, is titled The Un-Dead. (Note: As the typescript under the title The Un-Dead bears the copyright date 1897 and the first known advertisement for the novel under the title Dracula appeared on 8 May 1897, Paul McAlduff concludes that the title was changed sometime between 1 January and 8 May that year.) The surviving typewritten publishing agreement was signed and dated 25 May 1897; Peter Beal of Sotheby's suggests its signing one day before the official publication date indicates that it was a formality. To protect his copyright interest for adaptations, (Note: This was necessary under the Theatres Act 1843 (6 & 7 Vict. c. 68)) Stoker organised a reading of his stage adaptation of the novel in the week before publication in the Lyceum Theatre. A small group, primarily theatre staff, attended the reading, and Edith Craig played Mina.

Bound in yellow cloth and titled in red letters, Dracula was published in May 1897 by Archibald Constable and Company. It cost 6 shillings. Uncertainty exists around the exact date of publication, but it was probably published on 26 May 1897. Stoker wrote to William Gladstone that the novel would be released on the 26th. (Note: The Daily News said it was "published to-day" in an article published May 27.) Paul McAlduff writes that it was published "on or about May 26". Eighteen-Bisang states it could have been published anywhere from late May to June 1897.

Stoker's mother, Charlotte Stoker, enthused about the novel and predicted it would bring her son immense financial success. She was wrong: the novel, although reviewed well, failed to earn Stoker much money and did not establish his critical reputation until after his death. For the first thousand sales of Dracula, Stoker earned no royalties. Following serialisation by American newspapers, Doubleday & McClure published an American edition in 1899 with some textual changes. A cheaper paperback version was published by Constable in 1901, but few copies have survived. The text is around 15% shorter than the original but it is not known if Stoker made the amendments. Since its publication, Dracula has never been out of print.

An edition of the novel edited by McNally and Florescu in 1979 was the first to include Dracula's "missing chapter", "Dracula's Guest". Bram's widow Florence Stoker included the chapter as a short story in Dracula's Guest and Other Weird Tales (1914), two years after his death. While some commentators have described the prose as Dracula's discarded first chapter, Clive Leatherdale contests this, arguing that the material was incorporated into the published novel.

== Style ==
=== Epistolary structure ===
Dracula is an epistolary novel. Compared to other elements of the novel, critic David Seed writes that its epistolary structure has been neglected in analyses. Critics note Stoker's decision to structure the novel this way may relate to a 19th-century trend of publishing diaries and travelogue accounts, especially with Harker's account of the journey to Transylvania. Seed writes that Harker's initial four chapters function as a "miniaturised-pastiche-Gothic novel"—replacing Radcliffe's use of the Apennine Mountains in The Mysteries of Udolpho (1794) with the Carpathian Mountains of Transylvania—and places this within the Gothic tradition of intertextuality.

David Seed argues that the structure only provides a narrative voice to Dracula's opponents, while Miller writes that the "collaborative narration" reinforces the idea that Dracula must be defeated by a combined effort. Allison Case says Seed views that Dracula's absence generates tension by offering only "tantalizing glimpses" of his activities, while literary critic Franco Moretti writes that it highlights the power struggle between the vampire and his hunters. Similarly, Allison Case views the structure as representing a power struggle between Mina and the male protagonists for "narrative mastery". Seed notes that the narrative's style distances the reader from its plot. Dracula's journey on the Demeter is captured by the captain on the logbook, then "translated by the Russian consul, transcribed by a local journalist, and finally pasted by Mina into her journal".

=== Gothic genre ===
Dracula is an enduring work of Gothic literature, with some critics locating it within the traditions of Irish Gothic or Urban Gothic. John C. Tibbetts considers Dracula a prototype for later themes in the Gothic genre. The novel is characteristically Gothic in its depiction of the supernatural, preoccupation with the past, and embodying of the racial, gendered and sexual anxieties of fin de siècle England. Count Dracula generally represents these tensions: cultural critic Jack Halberstam notes that he is masculinised and feminised; Jerrold E. Hogle highlights his attraction to both Jonathan and Mina, and his appearance as racially western and eastern. Miller notes that the Count's physical characteristics were typical of Gothic villains during Stoker's lifetime, specifically citing his hooked nose, pallor, large moustache and thick eyebrows as influenced by his villainous predecessors. Dracula deviates from other Gothic tales before it by firmly establishing its time as the modern era, a point raised by one contemporary reviewer. Writers of the mode were drawn to the Eastern Europe setting because travelogues presented it as a land of primitive superstitions.

== Reception ==
Modern critics frequently write that Dracula had a mixed critical reception upon publication. Carol Margaret Davison, for example, notes an "uneven" response from critics contemporary to Stoker. John Edgar Browning, a scholar whose research focuses on Dracula and literary vampires, conducted a review of the novel's early criticism in 2012 and determined that Dracula had been "a critically acclaimed novel". (Note: Browning identified only three as "wholly or mostly negative"; four as "mixed" in their assessment; ten as "generally positive"; and the rest as positive and possessing no negative reservations. Among the positive reviews, Browning writes that 36 were unreserved in their praise, including publications like The Daily Mail, The Daily Telegraph, and Lloyd's Weekly Newspaper.) Raymond T. McNally and Radu Florescu's In Search of Dracula (1972) mentions the novel's "immediate success". (Note: This footnote provides the page number for the 1994 edition; In Search of Dracula was first published in 1972.) Other works about Dracula also published in 1972 concur; Gabriel Ronay says the novel was "recognised by fans and critics alike as a horror writer's stroke of genius", and Anthony Masters mentions the novel's "enormous popular appeal". Since the 1970s, Dracula has been the subject of significant academic interest; the novel has spawned many nonfiction books and articles, and has a dedicated peer-reviewed journal. Publishers started creating editions aimed at classroom teaching in the 1980s, providing the novel alongside historical context and scholarly analysis. The novel's complexity has permitted a flexibility of interpretation, with Anca Andriescu Garcia describing interest from scholars of psychoanalysis, postcolonialism, social class, and the Gothic genre.

It is said of Mrs. Radcliffe that, when writing her now almost forgotten romances, she shut herself up in absolute seclusion, and fed upon raw beef, in order to give her work the desired atmosphere of gloom, tragedy and terror. If one had no assurance to the contrary, one might well suppose that a similar method and regimen had been adopted by Mr. Bram Stoker while writing his new novel Dracula.

— The Daily Mail, 1 June 1897

Contemporary reviewers frequently compared the novel to other Gothic writers. Comparisons to novelist Wilkie Collins and The Woman in White (1859) were especially common, owing to similarities in structure and style. (Note: The full text of all contemporary reviews listed in the bibliography's "contemporary critical reviews" can be found, faithfully reproduced, in John Edgar Browning's Bram Stoker's Dracula: The Critical Feast (2012).) A review appearing in The Bookseller notes that the novel could almost have been written by Collins, and an anonymous review in Saturday Review of Politics, Literature, Science and Art wrote that Dracula improved upon the style of Gothic pioneer Ann Radcliffe; Radcliffe was also referenced by The Daily Mail, (Note: See boxed quote.) which also highlighted The Mysteries of Udolpho, Frankenstein (1818), and The Fall of the House of Usher (1839). Another anonymous writer described Stoker as "the Edgar Allan Poe of the nineties". Other favourable comparisons to other Gothic novelists included the Brontë sisters and Mary Shelley. Arthur Conan Doyle sent a letter to Stoker after reading Dracula, writing: "The old Professor is most excellent and so are the two girls. I congratulate you with all my heart for having written so fine a book."

Many of these early reviews were charmed by Stoker's treatment of the vampire myth. The Daily Telegraph called it the best vampire story ever written. The Daily Telegraph's reviewer noted that while earlier Gothic works, like The Castle of Otranto, had kept the supernatural far away from the novelists' home countries, Dracula's horrors occurred in foreign lands and at home in Whitby and Hampstead Heath. An Australian paper, The Advertiser, regarded the novel as simultaneously sensational and domestic. One reviewer praised the "considerable power" of Stoker's prose and described it as impressionistic. They were less fond of the parts set in England, finding the vampire suited better to tales set far away from home. The British magazine Vanity Fair found Dracula's disdain for garlic unintentionally funny.

Dracula was considered frightening. A review appearing in The Manchester Guardian in 1897 praised its capacity to entertain, but concluded that Stoker erred in including so much horror. Likewise, Vanity Fair opined that the novel was "praiseworthy" and absorbing, but could not recommend it to those who were not "strong". Stoker's prose was commended as effective in sustaining the novel's horror by many publications. A reviewer for the San Francisco Wave called the novel a "literary failure"; they elaborated that coupling vampires with frightening imagery, such as insane asylums and "unnatural appetites", made the horror too overt, and that other works in the genre, such as Strange Case of Dr Jekyll and Mr Hyde (1886), had more restraint.

== Context and interpretation ==
=== Sexuality and gender ===
Sexuality and seduction are two of the novel's most frequently discussed themes, and modern critical writings about vampirism widely acknowledge its link to sex and sexuality. Across the novel's critical history, Miller writes that theorists have collectively argued that the Count breaks virtually "every Victorian taboo", including "non-procreative sexuality, abnormal sexuality, fellatio, bisexuality, incest and the abuse of children".

Transgressive or abnormal sexuality within Dracula is a broad topic. Some psychosexual critics explore the novel's disruption of Victorian gender roles; within the Victorian context, Christopher Craft writes males had "the right and responsibility of vigorous appetite" while women were required to "suffer and be still". Critics highlight the many places in which the novel disrupts these social mores: Jonathan Harker's excitement over the prospect of being penetrated; Dracula's resulting anger and jealousy; and Lucy's transformation into a sexually aggressive predator who drains "vital fluid". Some critics, including professor Carol Senf, argue that the novel reflects anxiety about female sexual awakening as a threat to established norms.

Dracula contains no overt homosexual acts, but homosexuality and homoeroticism are elements discussed by critics. Christopher Craft argues that the primary threat Dracula poses is that he will "seduce, penetrate, [and] drain another male", and reads Harker's excitement to submit as a proxy for "an implicitly homoerotic desire". Victorian readers would have identified Dracula with sexual threat. Some critics note that changes made to the 1899 American version of the text reinforce this subtext, wherein Dracula states he will feed on Harker. Critics have variously linked these themes to homoerotic letters Stoker wrote to Walt Whitman, his friendship with Oscar Wilde, (Note: While some write that Stoker started writing the novel after Wilde's imprisonment for homosexuality in 1895, Stoker had been writing Dracula from as early as 1890.) his intensely emotional relationship with Irving, and contemporary rumours of Stoker's almost sexless marriage. David J. Skal acknowledged the letters' subtext but cautioned against applying anachronistic modern sexual labels to Stoker.

Many critics have suggested that the novel reveals a "reactionary response" to the New Woman phenomenon. This is a late-Victorian term used to describe an emerging class of women with increased social and economic control over their lives. Several critics describe the battle against Dracula as a fight for control over women's bodies. Senf suggests that Stoker was ambivalent about the New Woman phenomenon, while Elizabeth Signorotti argues that the novel's discomfort with female sexual autonomy reflects Stoker's dislike for the movement. Both Lucy and Mina have characteristics associated with the New Woman; (Note: Allison Case writes that Lucy is "ambiguously linked" to the concept through her "sexual assertiveness", while Mina is connected to the idea through her professional occupation and skills.) Mina, who plays an important role in Dracula's defeat, repeatedly expresses contempt for the concept. Senf notes that Lucy is punished for expressing dissatisfaction with her social position as a woman. After her transformation into a vampire, her defeat by the vampire hunters symbolises the re-establishment of "male supremacy".

=== Race ===
Dracula, and specifically the Count's migration to Victorian England, is frequently read as emblematic of invasion literature, and a projection of fears about racial pollution. In an influential postcolonialist analysis, Stephen Arata describes the novel's cultural context of mounting anxiety in Britain over the decline of the British Empire, the rise of other world powers, and a "growing domestic unease" over the morality of imperial colonisation. Arata regards the novel as representing "reverse colonisation": fear of other races invading England and weakening its racial purity. Patricia McKee writes that Dracula represents a negation of white culture while Mina represents "pure whiteness". Dracula can be said to both kill white bodies and turn them into the racial Other in death. Some critics connect the racialisation of Dracula to his depiction as a degenerate criminal.

Critics frequently identify antisemitic themes and imagery in the novel. Between 1891 and 1900, the number of Jews living in England increased sixfold, mainly due to antisemitic legislation and pogroms in Eastern Europe. Examples cited by Halberstam of antisemitic connections include Dracula's appearance, wealth, parasitic bloodlust, and "lack of allegiance" to one country. (Note: For further reading on the last point, Zygmunt Bauman writes that the perceived "eternal homelessness" of the Jewish people has contributed to discrimination against them.) Dracula's appearance resembles some other cultural depictions of Jews, such as Fagin in Charles Dickens's Oliver Twist (1838), and Svengali of George du Maurier's Trilby (1895). Jewish people were frequently described as parasites in Victorian literature; Halberstam highlights fears that Jews would spread diseases of the blood, and one journalist's description of Jews as "Yiddish bloodsuckers". Daniel Renshaw writes that any antisemitism in the text is "semi-subliminal"; he writes that Dracula is not Jewish but does reflect the 19th-century conception of Jewish people. Renshaw frames the novel more broadly as a general suspicion of all foreigners.

The novel's depiction of Slovaks and Romani people has attracted limited scholarly attention. In the novel, Harker describes the Slovaks as "barbarians" and their boats as "primitive", reflecting his imperialistic condescension towards other cultures. Peter Arnds writes that the Count's control over the Romani and his abduction of young children evoke folk superstitions about Romani people stealing children, and that his ability to transform into a wolf is related to xenophobic beliefs about the Romani as animalistic. Laura Sagolla Croley argues that Dracula's association with the Romani made him suspect in the eyes of Victorian England, where they were stigmatised owing to beliefs that they ate "unclean meat" and lived among animals.

=== Religion, superstition, and science ===
Dracula is saturated with religious imagery, but this has traditionally been explored with less frequency by critics. Christopher Herbert regards the novel as a parable about conflict with an enemy who opposes Christ and Christianity, and argues that Van Helsing is characterised as more of a priest than a scientist, "and the novel's main religious authority". Scholars discuss the novel's depiction of religion in relation to late Victorian anxieties about the threat which secularism, scientific rationalism and the occult posed to Christian beliefs and morality. Stoker himself had a lifelong interest in supernatural inquiry, and Herbert writes that he mixes the supernatural and superstitious beliefs with religious elements, resulting in metaphors about moral uncleanness becoming literal elements of the text's "occult reality". Herbert notes that the blood of Christ is important to Christian ritual and imagery, and Richard Noll notes that actual consumption of human blood is one of the oldest Judeo-Christian taboos.

The vampire hunters use many weapons—including Christian practices and symbols (prayer, crucifixes and consecrated hosts), folkloric practices (garlic, staking and decapitation) and contemporary technology (typewriters, phonographs, telegrams, blood transfusions and Winchester rifles)—in their battle against Dracula. Sanders argues that Stoker presents Christianity as a religion that can be instrumentalised and incorporated into scientific knowledge. Herbert describes Van Helsing's "Christian purification" of Lucy as punitively addressing her promiscuity, and the resulting framing of Christianity as a means towards the "eradication of deviancy".

=== Political and economic ===
Critics discuss the novel in relation to British rule in Ireland and Irish nationalism. Considerable debate exists over whether Dracula is an Irish novel; while it is largely set in England, Stoker was born in British-ruled Ireland and lived there for the first 30 years of his life. Though born into a Protestant family, he was distanced from the religion's more conservative factions.

Raphaël Ingelbien notes that "recognizably nationalist" critics like Terry Eagleton and Seamus Deane favoured readings of Dracula as "a bloodthirsty caricature of the aristocratic landlord" where the vampire represents the death of feudalism. Bruce Stewart changes the focus to the lower classes, suggesting Dracula and his Romani followers more likely represented violence by Irish National Land League activists. Michael Valdez Moses compares Dracula to the disgraced Charles Stewart Parnell, leader of the Irish Home Rule movement from 1880 to 1882. Robert Smart argues that Stoker's experience during the Great Famine (1845–1852) influenced the novel, with Stewart also noting this as historical context.

Some critics discuss Count Dracula's noble title. Literary critic Franco Moretti writes that he is an aristocrat "only in a manner of speaking", citing his lack of servants, simple clothing, and lack of aristocratic hobbies. Moretti suggests that Dracula's blood thirst represents capital's desire to accumulate more capital. More generally, Moretti argues the novel evinces cultural anxiety about foreign capitalist monopolies functioning as a return of feudalism. Chris Baldick maintains this line of analysis, describing Dracula as an undead symbol of feudalism but concluding that the novel is more concerned with "sexual and religious terrors". Mark Neocleous writes that Dracula symbolises the victory of the bourgeoisie over feudalism. In Das Kapital, Karl Marx compared the bourgeoisie's exploitation of workers to a vampire draining blood. He uses vampires as a metaphor three times in Das Kapital, but these predate the writing of Dracula.

=== Disease ===
Contagious disease was a topic of social and medical concern in late Victorian England. Vampirism can represent disease, being both an initial infection and the resulting illness. The novel characterises vampirism with terms from social degeneration theory, an 18th- and 19th-century social and biological concept arising from fear over the deterioration of the "human condition"; Victorian psychiatry, known then as "alienism"; and anthropology. Theories of degeneracy propagated Victorian-era beliefs about poor moral character being transmissible like a pathogen. Halberstam writes that Dracula and Renfield's relationship suggests that vampirism is "a psychological disorder, an addictive activity". He notes that Renfield, and by association Dracula, is described by doctors using terminology more appropriate for describing animals. Brian Aldiss writes that Count Dracula represents the initial disease while Renfield's madness is a symptom of advanced infection. Jack Halberstam highlights that disease was frequently associated with Jews during the period. Sexually transmitted infection, particularly syphilis, is a frequent topic. Literary critic Martin Willis writes that the novel depicts Victorian discourse over the origin, cause and treatment of disease, especially in the context of Lucy's treatment and eventual death.

== Legacy ==
=== Adaptations ===
Bela Lugosi as Dracula in a 1931 adaptation

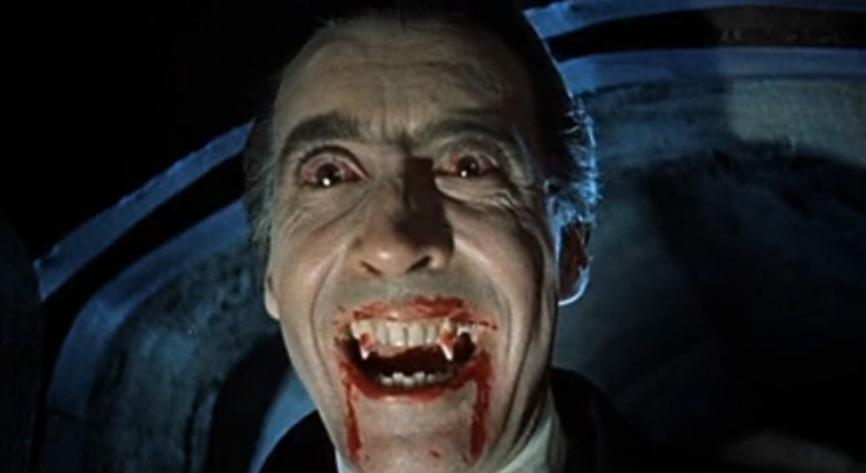
Christopher Lee as the title character in Dracula (1958)

Dracula has been adapted many times across virtually all forms of media. Scholars John Edgar Browning and Caroline Joan S. Picart note that the novel and its characters have been adapted for film, television, video games and animation over 700 times, with nearly 1000 additional appearances in comic books and on the stage; in 2015, the Guinness Book of World Records named Dracula the most portrayed literary character, noting he had appeared almost twice as much as Conan Doyle's Sherlock Holmes. Literary critic Roberto Fernández Retamar deemed Count Dracula—alongside Frankenstein's monster, Mickey Mouse and Superman—to be a part of the "hegemonic Anglo-Saxon world['s] cinematic fodder". Across the world, new adaptations can be produced as often as every week.

Adaptations were produced during Stoker's lifetime. Stoker's first theatrical adaptation, Dracula, or The Undead, was read once at the Lyceum Theatre. While the manuscript was believed lost, the British Library have extracts of the novel's galley proof with Stoker's handwritten stage directions and dialogue attribution. A Swedish newspaper serialised an adaptation from June 1899 to February 1900 as Mörkrets Makter ("Powers of Darkness"). This version is almost twice as long as Stoker's novel, containing elements included in Stoker's notes but not in the published novel. The adaptation contains an author's preface signed "B. S", which Eighteen-Bisang and Miller conclude was not written by Stoker. The Swedish adaptation was rediscovered and republished in 2017. In 1901, Valdimar Ásmundsson translated a heavily abridged version of the Swedish adaptation into Icelandic under the title Makt Myrkranna ("Powers of Darkness"). The adaptation included an abridged author's preface, purportedly by Stoker. Scholars knew the Icelandic version had existed since the 1980s because of the preface attributed to Stoker. When the Swedish translation was rediscovered, scholars learned that the Icelandic version had been translated from it rather than Stoker's Dracula.

The first film to feature Count Dracula was a Hungarian silent film—Károly Lajthay's Drakula halála (transl. The Death of Dracula). The film allegedly premiered in 1921 but this release date has been questioned by some scholars. Very little of the film survives, and David J. Skal notes that the cover artist for the 1926 Hungarian edition of the novel was more influenced by the second adaptation of Dracula, F. W. Murnau's Nosferatu (1922). Critic Wayne E. Hensley writes that the narrative of Nosferatu differs significantly from the novel, but that characters have clear counterparts. Bram Stoker's widow, Florence, initiated legal action against Prana, the studio behind Nosferatu. The legal case lasted two or three years, (Note: Some sources say the legal battle lasted only two, while others give the number as three.) with Prana agreeing to destroy all copies in May 1924. (Note: Some sources say that "all prints were ordered destroyed".)

Visual representations of the Count have changed significantly over time. Early treatments of Dracula's appearance were established by theatrical productions in London and New York. Later prominent portrayals of the character by Béla Lugosi (in a 1931 adaptation) and Christopher Lee (firstly in the 1958 film and later its sequels) built upon earlier versions. Chiefly, Dracula's early visual style involved a black-red colour scheme and slicked back hair. Lee's portrayal was overtly sexual, and also popularised fangs on screen. Gary Oldman's portrayal in Bram Stoker's Dracula (1992), directed by Francis Ford Coppola and costumed by Eiko Ishioka, established a new default look for the character—a Romanian accent and long hair. The assortment of adaptations feature many different dispositions and characteristics of the Count.

=== Influence ===
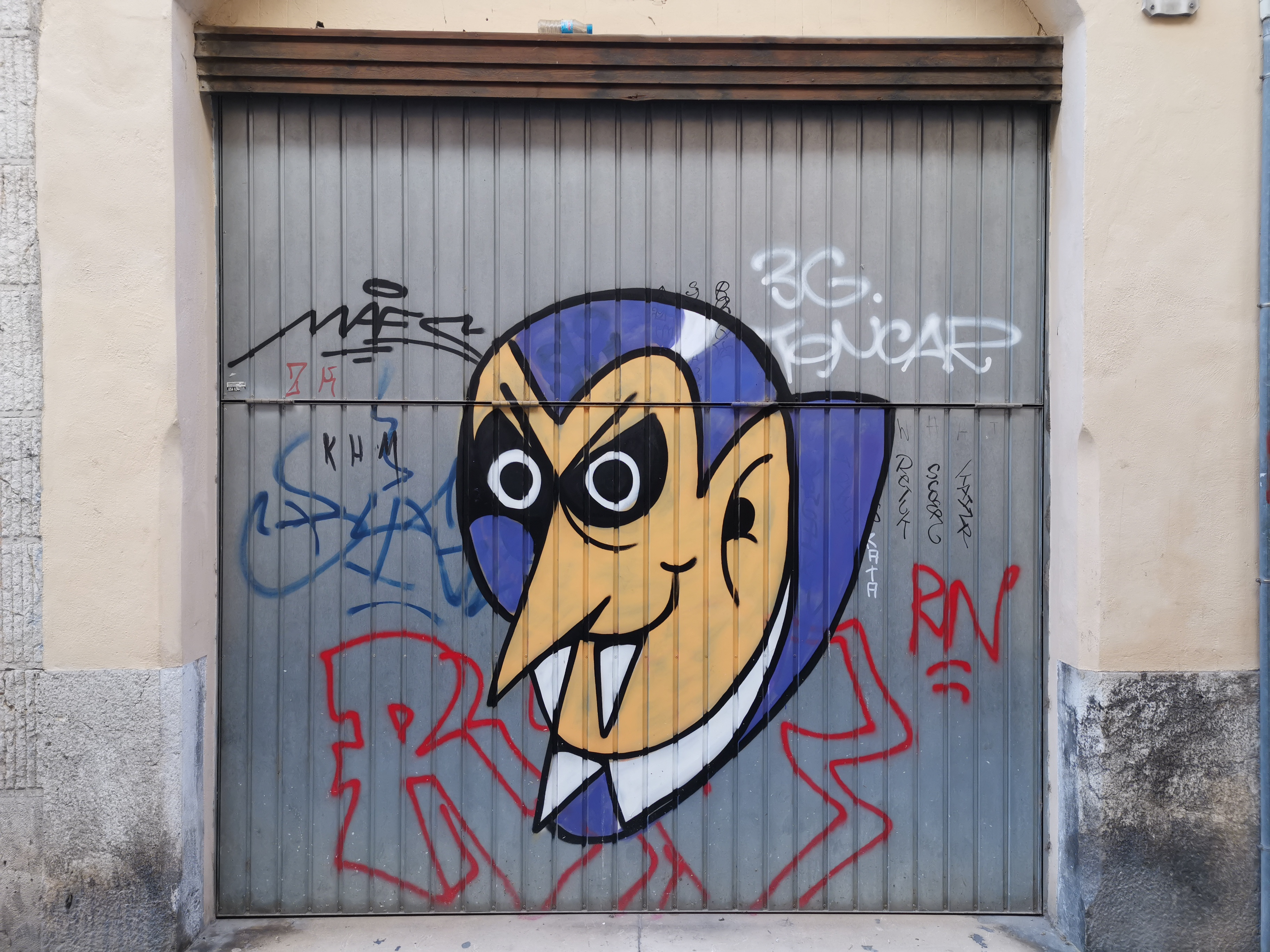
2019 graffiti of Dracula, the archetypal vampire

Dracula is one of the most famous and influential works of English literature. Although not the first novel to depict vampires, the work dominates both popular and scholarly treatments of vampire fiction. For many people, Count Dracula is the first character to come to mind when discussing vampires. Dracula succeeded by drawing together folklore, legend, vampire fiction and the conventions of the Gothic novel. Humanities scholar Wendy Doniger described the novel as vampire literature's "centrepiece, rendering all other vampires BS [Before Stoker] or AS [After Stoker]". William Hughes argues that the Count's cultural omnipresence negatively impacted academic analyses of the undead; Dracula is "the reference point" to which all other vampires are compared.

It profoundly shaped the popular understanding of how vampires function, including their strengths, weaknesses, and other characteristics. Bats had been associated with vampires before Dracula as a result of the vampire bat's existence—for example, Varney the Vampire (1847) included an image of a bat on its cover illustration—but Stoker deepened the association by making Dracula able to transform into one. That was, in turn, quickly taken up by film studios looking for opportunities to use special effects. Novelist Patrick McGrath notes that many of the Count's characteristics have been adopted by artists succeeding Stoker in depicting vampires, turning those fixtures into clichés. Aside from the Count's ability to transform, McGrath specifically highlights his hatred of garlic and crucifixes. William Hughes writes critically of the Count's cultural omnipresence, noting that the character of Dracula has "seriously inhibited" discussions of the undead in Gothic fiction.

In the 1930s, Universal Studios initiated development on a Dracula film and learned Stoker failed to comply with United States copyright law. This prematurely placed the novel into the public domain in the United States. (Note: Stoker was required to purchase the copyright and register two copies, but only registered one.) It was not until the 1960s that publishers recognised the novel's copyright status. Coinciding with the mass-market paperback's rising popularity, publishers began to produce their own versions. Stoker's mistake prevented his descendants from collecting royalties but provided ideal conditions for the novel to endure because writers and producers did not need to pay a licence fee to use the character of Count Dracula.

== Bibliography ==
=== Books ===
- Aldiss, Brian W.; Wingrove, David (1986). Trillion Year Spree: The History of Science Fiction. Internet Archive. Atheneum. ISBN 978-0-689-11839-5.
- Arnds, Peter (2015). "Gypsies and Jews as Wolves in Realist Fiction". Lycanthropy in German Literature. Palgrave Macmillan. pp. 69–96. doi:10.1057/9781137541635_5. ISBN 978-1-137-54163-5.
- Auerbach, Nina; Skal, David J., eds. (1997). Dracula: Authoritative Text, Contexts, Reviews and Reactions, Dramatic and Film Variations, Criticism. W.W. Norton. ISBN 978-0-393-97012-8.
  - Roth, Phyllis J. "Suddenly Sexual Women in Bram Stoker's Dracula". In Auerbach & Skal (1997).
- Baldick, Chris (1996). In Frankenstein's Shadow: Myth, Monstrosity, and Nineteenth-Century Writing. Clarendon Paperbacks (1 ed.). Clarendon Press. ISBN 978-0-19-812249-4.
- Bauman, Zygmunt (1991). Modernity and the Holocaust. Polity Press. ISBN 978-0-745-63809-6.
- Belford, Barbra (2002). Bram Stoker and The Man Who Was Dracula. Hachette Books. ISBN 0-306-81098-0.
- Beresford, Mathew (2008). From Demons to Dracula: The Creation of the Modern Vampire Myth. Reaktion. ISBN 978-1-86189-742-8. OCLC 647920291.
- Bordin, Ruth Birgitta Anderson (1993). Alice Freeman Palmer: The Evolution of a New Woman. University of Michigan Press. ISBN 9780472103928.
- Browning, John Edgar (2012). Bram Stoker's Dracula: The Critical Feast. Apocryphile Press. ISBN 978-1-937002-21-3.
- Browning, John Edgar, ed. (2009). Draculas, Vampires, and Other Undead Forms: Essays on Gender, Race, and Culture. Scarecrow Press. ISBN 978-0-8108-6923-3.
  - Nystrom, Lisa. "Blood, Lust, and the Fe/Male Narrative in Bram Stoker's Dracula (1992) and the Novel (1897)". In Browning (2009), pp. 63–76.
- Browning, John Edgar; Picart, Caroline Joan, eds. (2011). Dracula in Visual Media: Film, Television, Comic Book and Electronic Game Appearances, 1921–2010. McFarland & Co. ISBN 978-0-7864-3365-0. OCLC 664519546.
  - Stoker, Dacre. Foreword. In Browning & Picart (2011).
  - Skal, David J. "Introduction—Dracula: Undead and Unseen". In Browning & Picart (2011).
  - Eighteen-Bisang, Robert; Melton, J. Gordon. "Appendix 1: Dracula in Print. A Checklist". In Browning & Picart (2011).
- Davison, Carol Margaret (1997). "Introduction". In Davison, Carol Margaret (ed.). Bram Stoker's Dracula: Sucking through the Century, 1897–1997. Dundurn Press. ISBN 978-1-55488-105-5. OCLC 244770292.
- Eighteen-Bisang, Robert; Miller, Elizabeth, eds. (2008). Bram Stoker's Notes for Dracula: A Facsimile Edition. McFarland & Co. Pub. ISBN 978-0-7864-5186-9. OCLC 335291872.
  - Barsanti, Michael. Foreword. In Eighteen-Bisang & Miller (2008).
  - Eighteen-Bisang, Robert. "Various entries". In Eighteen-Bisang & Miller (2008).
- Farson, Daniel (1975). The Man Who Wrote Dracula: A Biography of Bram Stoker. Michael Joseph. ISBN 0-7181-1098-6. OCLC 1989574.
- Giesen, Rolf (2019). The Nosferatu Story: The Seminal Horror Film, Its Predecessors and Its Enduring Legacy. McFarland. ISBN 978-1-4766-3533-0.
- Glover, David (1996). Vampires, Mummies, and Liberals: Bram Stoker and the Politics of Popular Fiction. Duke University Press. ISBN 978-0-8223-1798-2.
- Herbert, Christopher (2019). Evangelical Gothic: The English Novel and the Religious War on Virtue from Wesley to Dracula. University of Virginia Press. ISBN 9780813943404.
- Hindle, Morris (1993). "Introduction". In Hindle, Morris (ed.). Bram Stoker: Dracula. Penguin. ISBN 0140433813.
- Hogle, Jerrold E. (2002). "Introduction". The Cambridge Companion to Gothic Fiction. Cambridge University Press. ISBN 9780521794664.
  - Hurley, Kelly. "British Gothic fiction, 1885–1930". In Hogle (2002).
- Hopkins, Lisa (2007). Bram Stoker: A Literary Life. Palgrave Macmillan. ISBN 978-1-4039-4647-8. OCLC 70335483.
- Hughes, William; Smith, Andrew, eds. (1998). Bram Stoker: History, Psychoanalysis and the Gothic. Macmillan Press. ISBN 978-1-349-26840-5.
  - Bierman, Joseph S. "A Crucial Stage in the Writing of Dracula". In Hughes & Smith (1998).
  - Milbank, Alison. "'Powers Old and New': Stoker's Alliances with Anglo-Irish Gothic". In Hughes & Smith (1998).
- Hughes, William (2009). Bram Stoker's Dracula: A Reader's Guide. A&C Black. ISBN 978-0-8264-9536-5.
- Killeen, Jarlath (2023). "Bram Stoker, Dracula and the Irish Dimension". In Killeen, Jarlath; Morin, Christina (eds.). Irish Gothic: An Edinburgh Companion. Edinburgh University Press. pp. 174–193. ISBN 978-1-3995-0055-5. JSTOR 10.3366/jj.5864760.14.
- Kord, Susanne (2009). Murderesses in German Writing, 1720–1860: Heroines of Horror. Cambridge University Press. ISBN 978-0-521-51977-9. OCLC 297147082.
- Leblanc, Benjamin H. (1997). "The Death of Dracula: A Darwinian Approach to the Vampire's Evolution". In Davison, Carol Margaret (ed.). Bram Stoker's Dracula: Sucking through the Century, 1897–1997. Dundurn Press. ISBN 978-1-55488-105-5. OCLC 244770292.
- Masters, Anthony (1972). The Natural History of the Vampire. G. P. Putnam's Sons. ISBN 9780399109317.
- McGrath, Patrick (1997). "Preface: Bram Stoker and his Vampire". In Davison, Carol Margaret (ed.). Bram Stoker's Dracula: Sucking through the Century, 1897–1997. Dundurn Press. ISBN 978-1-55488-105-5. OCLC 244770292.
- McNally, Raymond T.; Florescu, Radu (1994). In Search of Dracula: The History of Dracula and Vampires. Houghton Mifflin. ISBN 9780395657836.
- Mighall, Robert (1999). A Geography of Victorian Gothic Fiction: Mapping History's Nightmares. Oxford University Press. ISBN 0-19-818-472-7.
- Miller, Elizabeth (2001). Dracula. Parkstone Press. ISBN 9781874287247.
- Miller, Elizabeth (2005a). A Dracula Handbook. Xlibris. ISBN 978-1-4134-8095-5.
- Miller, Elizabeth, ed. (2005). "Bram Stoker's Working Papers for Dracula". Dictionary of Literary Biography, Volume 304: Bram Stoker's Dracula, A Documentary Volume. Thompson Gale. ISBN 078766841-9.
  - Frayling, Christopher; Miller, Elizabeth. "Bram Stoker's Working Papers for Dracula". In Miller (2005), pp. 170–181.
- Miller, Elizabeth (2006). Dracula: Sense and Nonsense (2nd ed.). Desert Island Books. ISBN 9781905328154.
- Noll, Richard, ed. (1992). Vampires, Werewolves, and Demons: Twentieth-Century Reports in the Psychiatric Literature. Brunner/Mazel. ISBN 978-0-87630-632-1.
- Punter, David, ed. (2012). A New Companion to the Gothic. Wiley-Blackwell. ISBN 978-1-4443-5492-8. OCLC 773567111.
  - Hughes, William. "Fictional Vampires in the Nineteenth and Twentieth Century". In Punter (2012), pp. 197–210.
- Ronay, Gabriel (1972). The Truth About Dracula. Stein and Day. ISBN 9780812815245.
- Senf, Carol A (2010). Bram Stoker. University of Wales Press. ISBN 978-0-7083-2306-9.
- Skal, David J. (2016). Something in the Blood: the Untold Story of Bram Stoker, the Man Who Wrote Dracula (1st ed.). Liveright Publishing Corporation. ISBN 978-1-63149-010-1.
- Stephanou, Aspasia (2014). Reading Vampire Gothic through Blood: Bloodlines. Palgrave Macmillan. ISBN 9781137349224. OCLC 873725229.
- Stoker, Bram (2019). Eighteen-Bisang, Robert; Miller, Elizabeth (eds.). Drafts of Dracula. Tellwell Talent. ISBN 9780228814313.
- Stoker, Dacre; Holt, Ian (2009). Dracula The Un-Dead. Penguin Publishing Group. pp. 312–313. ISBN 978-0-525-95129-2.
- Stuart, Roxana (1994). Stage Blood: Vampires of the 19th Century Stage. Popular Press. ISBN 978-0-87972-660-7.
- Tibbetts, John C. (2011). The Gothic Imagination: Conversations on Fantasy, Horror, and Science Fiction in the Media (1st ed.). Palgrave Macmillan. ISBN 978-0-230-11816-4. OCLC 704384802.
- Walker, Richard J. (2007). "The Blood is the Life: Bram Stoker's Infected Capital". Labyrinths of Deceit: Culture, Modernity and Identity in the Nineteenth Century. Vol. 44 (1 ed.). Liverpool University Press. pp. 256–283. doi:10.2307/j.ctt5vjbnd.18. ISBN 978-0-85323-849-2. JSTOR j.ctt5vjbnd.18. Archived from the original on 8 February 2022.

=== Journal and newspaper articles ===
- Andriescu Garcia, Anca (2018). "Dracula – Hybridity and Metafiction". Acta Universitatis Sapientiae, Philologica. 10 (1): 53–73. doi:10.2478/ausp-2018-0004.
- Arata, Stephen D. (1990). "The Occidental Tourist: 'Dracula' and the Anxiety of Reverse Colonization". Victorian Studies. 33 (4): 621–645. ISSN 0042-5222. JSTOR 3827794. Archived from the original on 3 June 2023.
- Beville, Maria (2011). "Figuring Phantasmagoria: The Tradition of the Fantastic in Irish Modernism". Nordic Irish Studies. 10: 63–78. ISSN 1602-124X. JSTOR 41702668.
- Bierman, Joseph S. (1 January 1977). "The Genesis and Dating of 'Dracula' from Bram Stoker's Working Notes". Notes and Queries. CCXXII (jan): 39–41. doi:10.1093/notesj/CCXXII.jan.39. ISSN 0029-3970. Archived from the original on 5 June 2024.
- Caine, Hall (24 April 1912). "Bram Stoker". The Daily Telegraph. p. 16.
- Case, Alison (1993). "Tasting the Original Apple: Gender and the Struggle for Narrative Authority in 'Dracula'". Narrative. 1 (3): 223–243. ISSN 1063-3685. JSTOR 20107013. Archived from the original on 20 May 2021.
- Cengel, Katya (October 2020). "How the Vampire Got His Fangs". Smithsonian Magazine. Archived from the original on 20 September 2021.
- Chevalier, Noel (2002). "Dracula: Sense & Nonsense by Elizabeth Miller (review)". ESC: English Studies in Canada. 28 (4): 749–751. doi:10.1353/esc.2002.0017. ISSN 1913-4835. S2CID 166341977. Archived from the original on 9 July 2024.
- Clasen, Mathias (2012). "Attention, Predation, Counterintuition: Why Dracula Won't Die". Style. 46 (3–4): 378–398. doi:10.5325/style.46.3-4.0378. ISSN 0039-4238. JSTOR 10.5325/style.46.3-4.378. Archived from the original on 27 January 2021.
- Craft, Christopher (1984). "'Kiss Me with those Red Lips': Gender and Inversion in Bram Stoker's Dracula". Representations (8): 107–133. doi:10.2307/2928560. ISSN 0734-6018. JSTOR 2928560. Archived from the original on 9 June 2021.
- Croley, Laura Sagolla (1995). "The Rhetoric of Reform in Stoker's 'Dracula': Depravity, Decline, and the Fin-de-Siècle 'Residuum'". Criticism. 37 (1): 85–108. ISSN 0011-1589. JSTOR 23116578. Archived from the original on 9 June 2021.
- Curran, Bob (2000). "Was Dracula an Irishman?". History Ireland. 8 (2). Archived from the original on 15 December 2024.
- Dearden, Lizzie (20 May 2014). "Radu Florescu Dead: Legacy of the Romanian 'Dracula professor'". The Independent. Archived from the original on 12 January 2021.
- Doniger, Wendy (20 November 1995). "Sympathy for the Vampire". The Nation. pp. 608–612.
- Fitts, Alexandra (1998). "Alejandra Pizarnik's 'La condesa Sangrienta' and the Lure of the Absolute". Letras Femeninas. 24 (1/2): 23–35. ISSN 0277-4356. JSTOR 23021659. Archived from the original on 27 January 2021.
- Halberstam, Judith (1993). "Technologies of Monstrosity: Bram Stoker's 'Dracula'". Victorian Studies. 36 (3): 333–352. ISSN 0042-5222. JSTOR 3828327. Archived from the original on 8 June 2021.
- Hennelly, Mark M. (2001). "Framing the Gothic: From Pillar to Post-Structuralism". College Literature. 28 (3): 68–87. ISSN 0093-3139. JSTOR 25112603. Archived from the original on 1 October 2025.
- Hensley, Wayne E. (2002). "The Contribution of F. W. Murnau's 'Nosferatu' to the Evolution of Dracula". Literature/Film Quarterly. 30 (1): 59–64. ISSN 0090-4260. JSTOR 43797068. Archived from the original on 28 January 2021.
- Herbert, Christopher (2002). "Vampire Religion". Representations. 79 (1): 100–121. doi:10.1525/rep.2002.79.1.100. ISSN 0734-6018. JSTOR 10.1525/rep.2002.79.1.100. Archived from the original on 1 October 2025.
- Ingelbien, Raphaël (2003). "Gothic Genealogies: Dracula, Bowen's Court, And Anglo-Irish Psychology". ELH. 70 (4): 1089–1105. doi:10.1353/elh.2004.0005. ISSN 1080-6547. S2CID 162335122. Archived from the original on 23 September 2022.
- Kane, Michael (1997). "Insiders/Outsiders: Conrad's 'The Nigger of the "Narcissus"' and Bram Stoker's 'Dracula'". The Modern Language Review. 92 (1): 1–21. doi:10.2307/3734681. ISSN 0026-7937. JSTOR 3734681. Archived from the original on 8 June 2021.
- Kuzmanovic, Dejan (2009). "Vampiric Seduction and Vicissitudes of Masculine Identity in Bram Stoker's 'Dracula'". Victorian Literature and Culture. 37 (2): 411–425. doi:10.1017/S1060150309090263. ISSN 1060-1503. JSTOR 40347238. S2CID 54921027.
- McAlduff, Paul S. (2012). "The Publication of Dracula". Journal of Dracula Studies. 14 (1). doi:10.70013/43k4l5m6.
- McKee, Patricia (2002). "Racialization, Capitalism, and Aesthetics in Stoker's "Dracula"". Novel: A Forum on Fiction. 36 (1): 42–60. doi:10.2307/1346114. ISSN 0029-5132. JSTOR 1346114. Archived from the original on 29 August 2024.
- Miller, Elizabeth (August 1996). "Filing for Divorce: Vlad Tepes vs. Count Dracula". The Borgo Post: 2.
- Miller, Elizabeth (1999). "Back to the Basics: Re-Examining Stoker's Sources for 'Dracula'". Journal of the Fantastic in the Arts. 10 (2 (38)): 187–196. ISSN 0897-0521. JSTOR 43308384. Archived from the original on 28 January 2021.
- Moretti, Franco (1982). "The Dialectic of Fear". New Left Review. 13 (136) 2197: 67–85. doi:10.64590/tqp.
- Moses, Michael Valdez (1997). "The Irish Vampire: Dracula, Parnell, and the Troubled Dreams of Nationhood". Journal X: A Journal in Culture and Criticism. 2 (1).
- Neocleous, Mark (2003). "The Political Economy of the Dead: Marx's Vampires". History of Political Thought. 24 (4): 668–684. ISSN 0143-781X. JSTOR 26220011. Archived from the original on 31 August 2025.
- Renshaw, Daniel (2022). "'A fine fellow ... although rather Semitic': Jews and Antisemitism in Jules Verne's Le Château des Carpathes and Bram Stoker's Dracula". Jewish Culture and History. 23 (4): 289–306. doi:10.1080/1462169X.2022.2131060.
- Retamar, Roberto Fernández; Winks, Christopher (2005). "On Dracula, the West, America, and Other Inventions". The Black Scholar. 35 (3): 22–29. doi:10.1080/00064246.2005.11413319. ISSN 0006-4246. JSTOR 41069152. S2CID 147429554. Archived from the original on 4 August 2021.
- Rhodes, Gary D. (1 January 2010). "Drakula Halála (1921): The Cinema's First Dracula". Horror Studies. 1 (1): 25–47. doi:10.1386/host.1.1.25/1.
- Sanders, Elizabeth (2015). "An Up-to-date Religion: The Challenges and Constructions of Belief in 'Dracula'". Religion and Literature. 47 (3). The University of Notre Dame: 77–98. JSTOR 26377442. Archived from the original on 1 October 2025.
- Schaffer, Talia (1994). "'A Wilde Desire Took Me': The Homoerotic History of Dracula". ELH. 61 (2): 381–425. doi:10.1353/elh.1994.0019. ISSN 1080-6547. S2CID 161888586. Archived from the original on 26 May 2021.
- Seed, David (1985). "The Narrative Method of Dracula". Nineteenth-Century Fiction. 40 (1): 61–75. doi:10.2307/3044836. ISSN 0029-0564. JSTOR 3044836. Archived from the original on 20 May 2021.
- Senf, Carol A. (1982). "'Dracula': Stoker's Response to the New Woman". Victorian Studies. 26 (1): 33–49. ISSN 0042-5222. JSTOR 3827492. Archived from the original on 28 January 2021.
- Signorotti, Elizabeth (1996). "Repossessing the Body: Transgressive Desire in 'Carmilla' and 'Dracula'". Criticism. 38 (4): 607–632. ISSN 0011-1589. JSTOR 23118160. Archived from the original on 28 January 2021.
- Smart, Robert (2007). "Suspect Grounds: Temporal and Spatial Paradoxes in Bram Stoker's Dracula: a Postcolonial Reading". Postcolonial Text. 3 (3): 1–22.
- Sommerlad, Joe (13 July 2017). "Celebrating Eiko Ishioka's extraordinary costumes for Bram Stoker's Dracula". The Independent. Archived from the original on 13 July 2021.
- Spencer, Kathleen L. (1992). "Purity and Danger: Dracula, the Urban Gothic, and the Late Victorian Degeneracy Crisis". ELH. 59 (1): 197–225. doi:10.2307/2873424. ISSN 0013-8304. JSTOR 2873424. Archived from the original on 21 May 2021.
- Stevenson, John Allen (1988). "A Vampire in the Mirror: The Sexuality of Dracula". PMLA. 103 (2): 139–149. doi:10.2307/462430. ISSN 0030-8129. JSTOR 462430. S2CID 54868687. Archived from the original on 25 June 2021.
- Stewart, Bruce (1999). "Bram Stoker's Dracula: Possessed by the Spirit of the Nation?". Irish University Review. 29 (2): 238–255. ISSN 0021-1427. JSTOR 25484813. Archived from the original on 23 September 2022.
- Tchaprazov, Stoyan (2015). "The Slovaks and Gypsies of Bram Stoker's Dracula: Vampires in Human Flesh". English Literature in Transition, 1880–1920. 58: 523–535. ProQuest 1684297393. Archived from the original on 28 September 2022.
- Tomaszweska, Monika (2004). "Vampirism and the Degeneration of the Imperial Race: Stoker's Dracula as the Invasive Degenerate Other" (PDF). Journal of Dracula Studies. 6. doi:10.70013/37k4l5m6. Archived (PDF) from the original on 15 November 2020.
- Warren, Louis S. (2002). "Buffalo Bill Meets Dracula: William F. Cody, Bram Stoker, and the Frontiers of Racial Decay" (PDF). The American Historical Review. 107 (4): 1124–1157. doi:10.1086/ahr/107.4.1124. ISSN 0002-8762. Archived (PDF) from the original on 8 July 2024.
- Wasserman, Judith (1977). "Women and Vampires: Dracula as a Victorian Novel". Midwest Quarterly. 18.
- "Why Christopher Lee's Dracula Didn't Suck". The Daily Telegraph. 13 June 2015. Archived from the original on 11 January 2022.
- Willis, Martin (2007). "'The Invisible Giant', 'Dracula', and Disease". Studies in the Novel. 39 (3): 301–325. ISSN 0039-3827. JSTOR 29533817. Archived from the original on 25 June 2021.
- Vorachek, Laura (2009). "Mesmerists and Other Meddlers: Social Darwinism, Degeneration, and Eugenics in Trilby". Victorian Literature and Culture. 37 (1): 197–215. doi:10.1017/S1060150309090123. ISSN 1060-1503. JSTOR 40347221. Archived from the original on 20 September 2021.
- Zanger, Jules (1991). "A Sympathetic Vibration: Dracula and the Jews". English Literature in Transition, 1880–1920. 34. Archived from the original on 12 July 2022.

==== Contemporary critical reviews ====
- "Book Reviews Reviewed". The Academy: A Weekly Review of Literature, Science, and Art. 31 July 1897. p. 98.
- "Current Literature: Hutchinson & Co's Publications". The Advertiser. 22 January 1898. p. 8.
- "Untitled". The Bookseller: A Newspaper of British and Foreign Literature. 3 September 1897. p. 816.
- "Untitled". The Daily Mail. 1 June 1897. p. 3.
- "Books of the Day". The Daily Telegraph. 3 June 1897. p. 6.
- "Dracula". The Glasgow Herald. 10 June 1897. p. 10.
- "Supped Full with Horrors". The Land of Sunshine. June 1899. p. 261.
- "A Romance of Vampirism". Lloyd's Weekly Newspaper. 30 May 1897. p. 80.
- "Untitled". Of Literature, Science, and Art (Fiction Supplement). 12 June 1897. p. 11.
- "Novels". The Manchester Guardian. 15 June 1897. p. 9.
- "A Fantastic Theme Realistically Treated". New-York Tribune (Illustrated Supplement). 19 November 1899.
- "Untitled". Publisher's Circular and Booksellers' Record of British and Foreign Literature. 7 August 1897. p. 131.
- "Recent Novels". Review of Politics, Literature, Theology, and Art. 79: 150–151. 31 July 1897.
- "The Insanity of the Horrible". The San Francisco Wave. 9 December 1899. p. 5.
- "Review: Dracula". Saturday Review of Politics, Literature, Science and Art. 3 July 1897. p. 21.
- "Books to Read, and Others". Vanity Fair: A Weekly Show of Political, Social, and Literary Wares. 29 June 1897. p. 80.

=== Websites ===
- Buzwell, Chris (14 May 2014). "Bram Stoker's stage adaptation of Dracula". The British Library. Archived from the original on 29 December 2014.
- "Most portrayed literary character in film". Guinness World Records. 2015. Archived from the original on 31 January 2025.
