= Sorcha Ní Fhlainn =

Irish academic

Sorcha Ní Fhlainn FHEA
- Awards: Lord Ruthven Award (2020)

Academic background
- Education: University College Dublin, BA; Manchester Metropolitan University, MA; Trinity College Dublin, PhD
- Thesis: Postmodern Vampires in Fiction, Culture, and Film (2019)

Academic work
- Main interests: vampire fiction, American cinema, horror film, and gothic studies

Sorcha Ní Fhlainn FHEA is an Irish academic who specializes in vampire fiction, horror film, and gothic studies. She is Reader in Film Studies and Co-Director of the Popular Screen Cultures Network at Manchester Metropolitan University, and was chair of the British Association of Film, Television and Screen Studies from 2021 until 2022. Among her works are The Worlds of Back to the Future (2010) and Postmodern Vampires: Film, Fiction, and Popular Culture (2019), the latter for which she won the 2020 Lord Ruthven Award in Non-Fiction.

== Biography ==
She obtained her BA in Arts (History and Politics) and MA in American Studies from University College Dublin, before obtaining her MA in Higher Education at Manchester Metropolitan University and PhD in English at Trinity College Dublin; her doctoral dissertation was I am the Dark Mirror; the vampire of my own heart": the postmodern vampire in fiction, film and culture 1975-2008 (2009). She later joined Manchester Metropolitan University, eventually becoming Reader in Film Studies.

As an academic, she specializes in vampire fiction, horror film, and gothic studies. She won the 2020 Lord Ruthven Award in Non-Fiction for her book Postmodern Vampires: Film, Fiction, and Popular Culture. She served as chair of the British Association of Film, Television and Screen Studies from 2021 until 2022. She was a 2023 winner of the British Association for American Studies Research Assistance Awards for her project "It’s About Time: the creative partnership of Robert Zemeckis and Bob Gale". and winner of a 2023 Harry Ransom Research Fellowship at the Harry Ransom Center. In addition to teaching, she is also Co-Director of the Popular Screen Cultures Network at Manchester Metropolitan University. and Series Co-Editor of Multiplexities: Popular Screen Cultures. She has also appeared as a commentator and interviewee for the BBC, TG4, and TRT World, as well as a documentary consultant.

She is a Senior Fellow of the Higher Education Academy.

She describes herself as "a huge music fan with eclectic taste from Irish traditional fusion to classic rock (and Hair/Heavy Metal), [who also] foster[s] a particular love of all things rooted in the 1980s (including its music and film scores!)".

== Bibliography ==
- Our Monstrous (s)kin: Blurring the Boundaries Between Monsters and Humanity (2009)
- The Worlds of Back to the Future (2010)
- Clive Barker: Dark imaginer (2017)
- Postmodern Vampires: Film, Fiction, and Popular Culture
- (ed. with Bernice M. Murphy) Twentieth-Century Gothic: An Edinburgh Companion (2022)

== Filmography ==
Year	Title	Role	Source
TBA	Teen Screams	Herself	
