= Carol Senf =

American professor

Carol A. Senf is professor and associate chair in the School of Literature, Media, and Communication at the Georgia Institute of Technology. With four books, two critical editions, one edited essay collection, and various critical essays, she is a recognized expert on the biography and works of Irish author Bram Stoker. She received the Lord Ruthven Award in 1999.

== Education ==
Senf was educated at Miami University (B.S. English/Education; M.A. English) and the State University of New York at Buffalo (PhD, 1979). Her PhD thesis, written under the direction of John Dings, was entitled Daughters of Lilith: An Analysis of the Vampire in Nineteenth-Century English Literature.

== Career ==
After one year as assistant professor of English at Furman University (1980-1981), Senf joined the Georgia Institute of Technology in 1981, where her teaching and scholarship has focused on Victorian literature and culture, the Gothic, gender studies, feminist studies, and Holocaust studies. In 1999 she received the Lord Ruthven Award for best nonfiction for Dracula: Between Tradition and Modernism. In 2012 she delivered the keynote address, "Bram Stoker: Ireland and Beyond", at the Bram Stoker Centenary Conference 2012: Bram Stoker: Life and Writing, held at Trinity College, Dublin.

== Selected works ==
- Bram Stoker. University of Wales Press, 2012.
- Bram Stoker’s The Mystery of the Sea: An Annotated Edition, Valancourt Books, 2007.
- Bram Stoker’s Lady Athlyne: An Annotated Edition, Desert Island Books Ltd., 2007.
- “Teaching the Gothic and the Scientific Context”, in: Approaches to Teaching Gothic Fiction: The British and American Traditions, eds. Diane Long Hoeveler and Tamar Heller. New York: The Modern Language Association of America, 2003, 83–89.
- Science and Social Science in Bram Stoker’s Fiction. Greenwood, 2002.
- Dracula: Between Tradition and Modernism. Twayne, 1998.
- Bram Stoker. A Reader's Companion. Twayne, 1998.
- A Critical Response to Bram Stoker, edited by Senf. Greenwood, 1993.
- The Vampire in Nineteenth-Century British Fiction, Bowling Green, OH: The Popular Press (1988).
- “Dracula: Stoker’s Response to the New Woman”. Victorian Studies, 26 (1982): 33–49.
- “Dracula: The Unseen Face in the Mirror”. Journal of Narrative Technique, 9 (1979): 160–70.
- "Why We Need the Gothic in a Technological World", in Humanistic Perspectives in a Technological World, ed. Richard Utz, Valerie B. Johnson, and Travis Denton (Atlanta: School of Literature, Media, and Communication, Georgia Institute of Technology, 2014), pp. 31–3.
