= Kelly Russell (musician) =

Canadian fiddle player

- Born: June 30, 1956; St. John's, Newfoundland and Labrador, Canada
- Genres: Folk
- Occupations: Musician, Teacher, Record producer
- Instruments: Fiddle, Violin, Concertina, Mandolin, Tin whistle, Celtic harp, Bouzouki
- Website: http://www.kellyrussell.ca/

Kelly Russell (born 30 June 1956) is a Canadian fiddle player and founding member of Newfoundland musical groups Figgy Duff and the Wonderful Grand Band. He is known for having worked closely with fellow Newfoundland fiddle players Émile Benoît and Rufus Guinchard and has collected over 500 traditional tunes unique to Newfoundland and Labrador. He is a recipient of the Queen's Diamond Jubilee Medal and was named as a Member of the Order of Canada. Russell is the son of famed Newfoundland writer and politician, Ted Russell, and Dora Oake Russell. His sister, Elizabeth Miller is an academic.

Russell was awarded an honorary doctorate degree from Memorial University of Newfoundland in October 2021 for his contributions to Newfoundland music.
