= Transylvanian Society of Dracula =

Cultural-historic non-profit group

The Transylvanian Society of Dracula (TSD) is a cultural-historic, non-profit, non-governmental organization. Its members include Romanian and international scholars, folklorists, historians, esoterists, writers, cultural anthropologists, and individuals interested in comparative religion, magic and mythology. The TSD organizes scholarly activities both in Romania and abroad, as well as tours to sites of TSD interest in Romania. Some high ranked Romanian members make money out of the touristic activities of the organization, through the Company of Mysterious Journeys tourist agency. Modifications to this agency have occurred since the founder Nicolae Paduraru died. The Halloween 2011 tour, for example, did not include Bran Castle or Curtea Veche -in spite of what was published on their website, but it included a beauty pageant. One of the Romanian members of TSD working at the agency was one of the presenters of the pageant.

== History ==
TSD was founded in the early 1990s by a group of writers, Romanian scholars, tourism experts, and others interested in Dracula and vampire folklore in Romania. Taking the lead was Nicolae Paduraru, formerly with the Romanian Ministry of Tourism. Paduraru died in May 2009

In May 1995, the TSD chapter in Romania organized the first World Dracula Congress. This event attracted scholars and aficionados from many countries. The list of speakers included some of the world's leading experts in the field, such as Gordon Melton, Elizabeth Miller, Matei Cazacu and Clive Leatherdale. The congress marked the first time when Romanian folklorists have the opportunity to share their knowledge and research in both the vampire legend and the history of Vlad Tepes with their counterparts in the West.

During the conference both the American and the Canadian chapter were established by J. Gordon Melton and Elizabeth Miller respectively. The North American chapter is now housed at Pennsylvania's Kutztown University who publishes The Journal of Dracula Studies each year. Edited by Dr Anne DeLong and Dr Curt Herr, the peer-reviewed journal publishes essays on Vampire Studies from around the world. A short time later, an Italian chapter was founded by Massimo Introvigne, and since 2001, there is a German chapter run by Dr. Mark Benecke who acts as world president since 2010. In 2006 a Russian Chapter was opened. It is run by Mrs. Ekaterina Buley and keeps functioning in Russia, still active, "safe and sound".

== Recent developments ==
The Canadian Chapter of the Transylvanian Society of Dracula was formed in 1995 following the first World Dracula Congress in Romania, as non-profit corporation. It published the MLA indexed Journal of Dracula Studies, with Elizabeth Miller as Chief Editor. It also published The Borgo Post, as a magazine for its members.

By the end of 2013, Dracula scholar Hans Corneel de Roos revived Letter from Castle Dracula, the news bulletin of the Romanian mother organization, and in cooperation with Daniela Diaconescu, Vice President of the T.S.D., published six illustrated issues with fresh research. Two years later, de Roos took the initiative to organize the Fourth World Dracula Congress, marking the T.S.D.'s 25 anniversary, in cooperation with Trinity College, Dublin. Co-organizers were Dr. Magdalena Grabias from Maria Curie-Sklodowska University in Lublin, Poland; Daniela Diaconescu, Bucharest, and (initially) Kristin Bone from San Diego, California. The conference took place on 20–21 October 2016, with Saturday 22 October dedicated to a Stoker-oriented walk through Dublin.

Although the international conference had an impressive roster of speakers and was considered a success, the inner circle of the T.S.D. in Bucharest decided not to follow up with further activities; instead, it subsumed itself under the North American Chapter of the Transylvanian Society of Dracula (TSD), formed at Kutztown University in Pennsylvania in 2016. The editorial seat of the Journal of Dracula Studies by now has been transferred to Kutztown University's English department, with Curt Herr and Anne DeLong as editors. The German and Italian chapters of the T.S.D not being active anymore, De Roos stepped back from his position at Letter from Castle Dracula and together with Magadalena Grabias initiated an independent international Dracula conference series ("Children of the Night" series) in cooperation with Transilvania University, Brașov. The first of these bi-annual conferences took place in October 2016; the series is supported by a "Children of the Night" Facebook group with 400 members.

The archive of Letter from Castle from Castle Dracula (23 December 2013 till 30 June 2016) is now hosted by The Vampire's Vault, a website managed by De Roos.

== Research Award ==
The Research Award of the Transylvanian Society has been granted twice during the 25 years of the existence of the Romanian mother organisation: Once to Prof. em. Elizabeth Miller from Toronto, for correcting numerous understandings about Stoker's novel and building a detailed documentation around his work for Dracula, and once to Hans Corneel de Roos, for the research contained in his book The Ultimate Dracula (Moonlake Editions, 2012) and his discovery that Makt myrkranna, the Icelandic version of Dracula, was no abridged translation of the English original, but a strongly modified version.
