= Nina Auerbach =

- Born: May 24, 1943; New York, New York, U.S.
- Died: February 4, 2017 (aged 73)
- Occupations: Professor of English, literary scholar

Nina Auerbach (May 24, 1943 in New York City – February 4, 2017) was the John Welsh Centennial Professor of English Emerita at the University of Pennsylvania. Her special area of concentration was nineteenth-century England. She published, lectured, and reviewed widely in the fields of Victorian literature, theater, cultural history, and horror fiction and film, and was particularly known for her expertise in the literary meaning of vampires.

== Biography ==
Auerbach received a B.A. from the University of Wisconsin-Madison in 1964. She undertook graduate study at Columbia University, receiving an M.A. in 1967 and a Ph.D. in 1970. She taught at Hunter College and California State University, Los Angeles before joining the University of Pennsylvania faculty in 1972. She remained on the faculty there until her retirement in 2009. She died in 2017, at the age of 73.

Her books include Our Vampires, Ourselves; Private Theatricals: The Lives of the Victorians; Ellen Terry, Player in Her Time; Romantic Imprisonment: Women and Other Glorified Outcasts; Woman and the Demon: The Life of a Victorian Myth; and Communities of Women: An Idea in Fiction (Harvard University Press). Her final book, Daphne du Maurier, Haunted Heiress (2000, ISBN 0812235304), inaugurated the University of Pennsylvania Press series, Personal Takes. Before her death, she was working on a project tentatively titled Lost Lives, a study of ghosts and their purposes. She was the co-editor of the Norton Critical Edition of Bram Stoker's Dracula and the University of Chicago Press Edition of Forbidden Journeys: Fairy Tales and Fantasies by Victorian Women Writers. Many of her articles have appeared in Norton Critical Editions, most notably in the works of Jane Austen.

Nina Auerbach was awarded a Guggenheim Fellowship and a Ford Foundation Fellowship as well as the Lindback Award for Distinguished Teaching. In 2000, she received the annual Distinguished Scholarship Award from the International Association of the Fantastic in the Arts.
