= Humanities and Social Sciences Communications =

Humanities & Social Sciences Communications
- Discipline: Social sciences, humanities
- Language: English
- Edited by: Gino D'Oca

Publication details
- Former name: Palgrave Communications
- History: 2015–present
- Publisher: Nature Portfolio
- Frequency: Continuous
- Open access: Yes
- License: Creative Commons Attribution
- Impact factor: 4.8 (2025)

Standard abbreviations
- ISO 4: Humanit. Soc. Sci. Commun.

Indexing
- ISSN: 2662-9992
- LCCN: 2016260034
- OCLC no.: 969749138

Links
- Journal homepage; Online access

Humanities and Social Sciences Communications is a peer-reviewed open access academic journal published by Nature Portfolio. It covers all areas of the social sciences and humanities. It was established in 2014 as Palgrave Communications (ISSN 2055-1045), obtaining its current name in 2020.

== Abstracting and indexing ==
The journal is abstracted and indexed in:

- Arts and Humanities Citation Index
- Current Contents/Arts & Humanities
- Current Contents/Social and Behavioral Sciences
- Index Islamicus
- Scopus
- Social Sciences Citation Index

According to the Journal Citation Reports, the journal has a 2025 impact factor of 4.8.
