= Elizabeth Miller (Canadian academic) =

Canadian academic (1939–2022)

Elizabeth Russell Miller
- Born: Elizabeth Anne Russell; 26 February 1939; St. John's, Newfoundland
- Died: 2 January 2022 (aged 82); St. John's, Newfoundland and Labrador, Canada
- Parents: Ted Russell (father); Dora Oake (mother)
- Relatives: Kelly Russell (brother)

Academic background
- Education: Memorial University of Newfoundland
- Thesis: Norman Duncan: A Critical Biography (1987)
- Doctoral advisor: Patrick O'Flaherty

Academic work
- Main interests: Dracula, Bram Stoker

Elizabeth Russell Miller (16 February 1939 – 2 January 2022) was a Canadian academic who was Professor Emerita at Memorial University of Newfoundland. She resided in Toronto. In her early academic career, she focused on Newfoundland literature, primarily the life and work of her father, well-known Newfoundland author and humorist Ted Russell. Beginning in 1990, her major field of research was Bram Stoker's novel Dracula, its author, sources and influence. She published several books on the subject, including Reflections on Dracula, Dracula: Sense & Nonsense, a volume on Dracula for the Dictionary of Literary Biography and, most recently, Bram Stoker's Notes for Dracula: A Facsimile Edition with Robert Eighteen-Bisang. She founded the Dracula Research Centre (now offline) and was the founding editor of the Journal of Dracula Studies now at Kutztown University of Pennsylvania. Miller died on 2 January 2022, at the age of 82.

== Honours and awards ==
=== Literary awards ===
- Lord Ruthven Award: Dracula: Sense & Nonsense - Best non-fiction book in vampire subgenre for 2000
- U.K. Dracula Society "Children of the Night" Award - Dracula: Sense & Nonsense - best book in horror/supernatural genre published in U.K. in 2000
- Lord Ruthven Award: Bram Stoker's Notes for Dracula: A Facsimile Edition (with Robert Eighteen-Bisang) - Best non-fiction book in vampire subgenre for 2008.
- Lifetime Achievement Award (The Bernard Davies Award), Dracula Society, 2012

=== Personal awards ===
- President’s Award for Distinguished Teaching Memorial University, 1992
- Baroness of the House of Dracula Honorary title bestowed on Elizabeth Miller by the Transylvanian Society of Dracula, Romania, 1995
- Daughter of the Town of Aref Honorary title bestowed on Elizabeth Miller by the mayor of Aref, Romania, in 2000

== Bibliography ==
=== Books ===
- The Lost Journal of Bram Stoker (2012). Edited by Elizabeth Miller and Dacre Stoker. London: The Robson Press.
- Bram Stoker's Notes for Dracula: A Facsimile Edition (2008) Bram Stoker Annotated and Transcribed by Robert Eighteen-Bisang and Elizabeth Miller, Foreword by Michael Barsanti. Jefferson NC & London: McFarland. ISBN 978-0-7864-3410-7
- Bram Stoker’s Dracula: A Documentary Volume. Dictionary of Literary Biography (vol. 304). Detroit: Thomson Gale, 2005.
- Dracula: Sense & Nonsense. 2000. Rev ed Southend-on-Sea, UK: Desert Island Books, 2006.
- A Dracula Handbook. XLibris, 2005 (self-published).
- Dracula: The Shade and the Shadow. Westcliff-on-Sea: Desert Island Books, 1998.
- Reflections on Dracula. White Rock, BC: Transylvania Press, 1997.

=== Articles ===
- "Getting to Know the Un-dead". In Vampires: Myths and Metaphors of Enduring Evil edited by Peter Day. Amsterdam: Rodopi, 2006. 3-19.
- "(Un)tot auf ewig? Hundert Jahre Dracula und kein Ende." In Draculas Wiederkehr, ed. T LeBlanc, C Ruthner & B Twrsnick. Wetzlar (Germany), 2003. pp. 9–27.
- "Vampire Hunting in Transylvania." In Newfoundland Quarterly, Dec 2002, pp. 33–35.
- Excerpts from Dracula: Sense & Nonsense in Three Vampire Tales. Boston: Houghton Mifflin (New Riverside Editions), 2002. Pp 47–56.
- "Shapeshifting Dracula: The Abridged Edition of 1901." In The Fantastic Vampire, ed James Craig Holte. Greenwood Press, 2002. Pp 3–9.
- "Back to the Basics: Re-Examining Stoker’s Sources for Dracula." Journal of the Fantastic in the Arts 10.2 (1999): 187-196.
- "Bats, Vampires and Dracula." The Night Flyer: News for the Friends of Florida’s Bats Vol 3, No 4 (Fall 1998): 1-3.
- "The Transylvanian Society of Dracula." In Bram Stoker’s Dracula: Sucking Through the Century, ed Carol M. Davison. Dundurn Press, 1997.
- "Dracula: The History of Myth and the Myth of History." Journal of the Dark No. 9 (Spring 1997).
- "A Genese do Conde Dracula." [Translated into Portuguese by Carla C. Periera Gonzales Megalon no. 43 (February 1997).
- "Frankenstein and Dracula: A Question of Influence." In Visions of the Fantastic, edited by Allienne Becker. Greenwood Press, 1996.
- "Foreword" to Lord of the Vampires by Jeanne Kalogridis. Delacorte Press, 1996.
- "The Genesis of Count Dracula." Lumea (Bucharest, Romania) September 1996.
- Vampires for the Nineties." Pro Cinema (Bucharest, Romania) August 1996.
- "The Genesis of Dracula." Transylvanian Journal: Dracula and Vampire Studies October 1995.
- "The World Dracula Congress." Locus August 1995.
- "Narrative Strategies in Dracula." Udolpho September 1995.

=== Other activities ===
Miller lectured regularly at venues including universities, academic conferences, ballet productions of Dracula and private functions. A participant in several TV documentaries including "Summer of the Vampire" (ABC "20/20), "Frontline International (PBS) and "Dracula: The Vampire & the Voivode", Miller was interviewed for feature articles appearing in a variety of newspapers and magazines.
