= William Hughes (professor of literature) =

English academic

William Hughes FRHistS FSA Scot is Professor of Literature in English at the University of Macau, China: he has specialised in the study of Bram Stoker. He was educated at the Liverpool Collegiate School and the University of East Anglia, and also holds a PGCE from Christ Church, Canterbury. He has presented radio programmes for the BBC World Service and BBC Radio 4, and has also appeared on live television through Living TV's Most Haunted Live!, most recently during the 2009 broadcast from St George's Hall, Liverpool. In 2015, he was elected a Fellow of the Royal Historical Society and, in 2019, a Fellow of the Society of Antiquaries of Scotland. Prior to accepting a chair at the University of Macau he was, for 26 years, a member of the English faculty at Bath Spa University, England, where he led teaching and research in the fields of Gothic Literature and the medical humanities.

== Publications ==
William Hughes is author, co-author or editor of twenty books and over 50 articles and book chapters connected with the Gothic, notably Beyond Dracula, the collections Bram Stoker: history, psychoanalysis and the Gothic (with Andrew Smith), Fictions of Unease: the Gothic from Otranto to "The X-Files" (with Andrew Smith and Diane Mason), Empire and the Gothic: the politics of genre (with Andrew Smith) and Queering the Gothic (also with Andrew Smith).

He has also produced scholarly editions of Stoker's The Lady of the Shroud and Dracula with Diane Mason. He was the editor of Gothic Studies, the refereed journal of the International Gothic Association, for the first twenty years of that publication's existence. His Bram Stoker: Dracula: a reader's guide to essential criticism was published by Palgrave on 21 November 2009 and Bram Stoker: a reader's guide was published by Continuum in the same year. His most recent volume of medical history is That Devil's Trick: Hypnotism and the Victorian Popular Imagination for Manchester University Press (2015). He is currently writing a monograph on Victorian phrenology, and published, in 2018, Key Concepts in the Gothic for Edinburgh University Press and the co-edited volume Gothic Britain (with Ruth Heholt) for University of Wales Press. His most recent publication, Suicide and the Gothic, co-edited with Andrew Smith for Manchester University Press, appeared in 2019.

With Prof Andrew Smith (University of Glamorgan), he was elected joint chair of the International Gothic Association for 2009–2013 at the biannual conference held at the University of Lancaster UK in July 2009.

== Academic activities ==
He is interested in supervising dissertations on all periods of the Gothic, particularly where these touch upon Bram Stoker, J. S. Le Fanu or Algernon Blackwood, continues to work upon the ecoGothic and Queer Gothic, and maintains an interest in nineteenth century medicine, pathology and criminal psychology.

He is a Fellow of the Royal Historical Society,a Fellow of the Society of Antiquaries of Scotland, and a Fellow of the Higher Education Academy.

== Online publications ==
- Bram Stoker – Victorian Fiction Research Guide
