= Caroline Joan S. Picart =

Filipino academic and writer

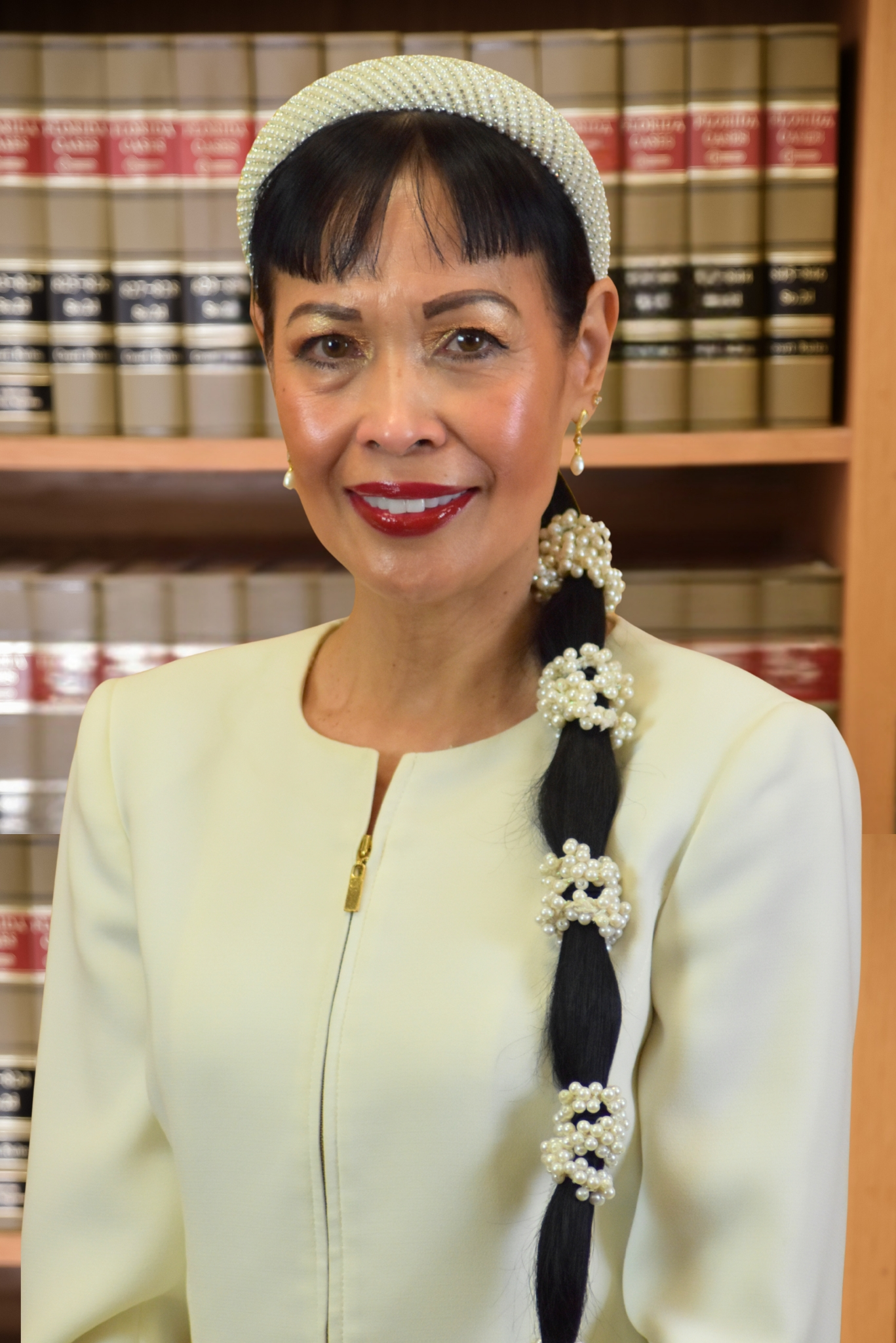
- Born: Nueva Vizcaya, Philippines
- Education: Ateneo de Manila University; Christ's College, Cambridge; Pennsylvania State University; University of Florida Levin College of Law; Cornell University School of Criticism and Theory
- Occupations: philosopher, lawyer, professor
- Known for: Founding Editor, Fairleigh Dickinson University Press Series on Law, Culture & the Humanities.Gothic Criminology (with Cecil Greek).
- Website: carolinekaypicart.com

Notes
- https://academic.oup.com/edited-volume/61796/chapter-abstract/546070633?login=false&redirectedFrom=fulltext

Caroline Joan S. Picart is a Filipino-born American philosopher, who has written and edited numerous books and anthologies on philosophy film, law, criminology, sociology, communications, and cultural studies, especially horror film. She is also a lawyer and had a radio show, The Dr. Caroline (Kay) Picart Show. In 2011, she received the Lord Ruthven Award, non-fiction category, for the book Dracula in Visual Media Film, Television, Comic Book and Electronic Game Appearances, 1921-2010, co-authored with John Edgar Browning. Currently, she is an appeals attorney at the Florida 10th Judicial Circuit Public Defender's Office.

== Early life and education ==
Picart was born in Nueva Vizcaya, Philippines. Her father, Robert, has a Filipino-French-American ancestry, and her mother, Anarose, a Filipino-Chinese-Spanish background. She was active during the 1986 People's Power Revolution that overthrew Ferdinand Marcos. Picart has drawn from this experience in several of her published works. Picart graduated with a B.S. in Biology (magna cum laude) in 1987, and an M.A. in Philosophy from the Ateneo de Manila University in 1989, while teaching as a university lecturer in Zoology, Philosophy and Astro-Physics at both the Ateneo de Manila University and the San Carlos Pastoral Formation Complex. She was the first Filipina recipient of the Sir Run Run Shaw Scholarship at Christ's College, Cambridge, and graduated with an M.Phil from the Department of History and Philosophy of Science as the Wolfson Prize Winner in 1991. After teaching at Yonsei University's Foreign Language Institute from 1992 to 1993, in 1996 she completed her Ph.D. in Philosophy, with doctoral minors in Aesthetics, Criticism and Theory from Pennsylvania State University, before she completed a post-doctoral summer seminar with Cornell University's School of Criticism and Theory in 1999.

== Professional life ==
In the U.S., Picart was an adjunct professor at Florida Atlantic University-Davie from 1996 to 1997, and accepted a Senior Fellowship from the University of Wisconsin–Eau Claire in 1997, and was assistant professor in philosophy at Wisconsin Eau-Claire from 1997 to 1999. From 1999 to 2000, she was assistant professor at St. Lawrence University. From 2000 to 2008, she was at Florida State University, where she was tenured in 2004 and was a Courtesy Professor of Law, teaching interdisciplinary law courses. In 2009 she began studying law at the University of Florida Levin College of Law. She graduated from the University of Florida Levin College of Law in 2013, with a joint J.D.-M.A. (cum laude) (Law and Women’s Studies) with Certificates in International Law and Intellectual Property Law, was the Editor-in-Chief of the Florida Journal of International Law, and passed the Florida Bar in 2013. From 2017-2019 and 2021, she was an adjunct law professor at FAMU.

Picart has written, co-authored or co-edited 21 published books on philosophy and literature, film, cultural studies, criminology, sociology, communications, law and its interdisciplinary connections, as well as numerous scholarly and popular journal articles.

Picart's radio show, The Dr. Caroline (Kay) Picart Show, in nine months of airing, was picked up, in excerpted form, by 59 radio stations, and had an estimated listenership of over two million. She founded the Fairleigh Dickinson University Press Series on Law, Culture and the Humanities in 2015.

== Works ==
=== Books ===
- Countering Jihadi Cool Narrative, Law, Culture, and Philosophy Against Global Jihad (Fairleigh Dickinson University Press, September 2025)
- Monsters, Law, Crime: Explorations in Gothic Criminology (Fairleigh Dickinson University Press, December 2020).
- American Self-Activating Terrorists and the Allure of Jihadi Cool/Chic, (Cambridge Scholars Publishing, March 2017).
- Copyright and Critical Race Theory in American Dance: Whiteness as Status Property. Palgrave-Macmillan, 2013.
- (with Browning, J.E.) Speaking of Monsters: A Teratological Anthology. Palgrave-Macmillan, 2012.
- (with Browning, John E.) Dracula in Visual Media Film, Television, Comic Book and Electronic Game Appearances, 1921-2010. Foreword by Dacre Stoker; Afterword by Ian Holt, McFarland Press, 2010. Awarded the Lord Ruthven Award in Literary Criticism, 2011.
- (with John Browning) Draculas, Vampires and Other Undead Forms: Essays on Gender, Race and Culture. Lanham, MD: Scarecrow Press, May, 2009.
- (with Cecil Greek) Monsters in and Among Us: Towards a Gothic Criminology. Madison, New Jersey: Fairleigh Dickinson University Press, October, 2007.
- (with David Frank; introductions by Dominick LaCapra and Edward Ingebretsen) Frames of Evil: The Holocaust as Horror in American Film. Carbondale, IL: Southern Illinois University Press, November 2006. Nominated for the National Communication Association “Best Book” Awards in both the Rhetorical Theory division and the Visual Communication Division.
- From Ballroom Dance to DanceSport: Aesthetics, Athletics and Body Culture. Albany, NY: State University of New York Press, January 2006. Nominated for the National Communication Association “Best Book” Awards in both the Rhetorical Theory division and the Visual Communication Division.
- Picart, Caroline J. S. Inside Notes from the Outside. Lanham, MD: Lexington Books/Rowman and Littlefield, 2004.
- The Holocaust Film Sourcebook (Fiction, Documentary, Propaganda) 2 Volumes. Westport, CT: Praeger, 2004.
- Remaking the Frankenstein Myth on Film: Between Laughter and Horror. Albany, NY: State University of New York Press, 2003.
- The Cinematic Rebirths of Frankenstein: Universal, Hammer and Beyond. Westport, CT: Praeger, 2001. Nominated for Current Research Session, Society for Phenomenology and Existential Philosophy and the National Communication Association Diamond Anniversary Award, (2002).
- (with Frank Smoot and Jayne Blodgett) A Frankenstein Film Sourcebook Westport, CT: Greenwood, 2001.
- Resentment and The Feminine in Nietzsche’s Politico-Aesthetics. University Park, PA: The Pennsylvania State University Press, 1999. Nominated for Second American Philosophical Association Book Prize for Younger Scholars; American Metaphysical Society, John Findlay Prize; Current Research Session, Society for Phenomenology and Existential Philosophy (2001 and 2002).
- Thomas Mann and Friedrich Nietzsche: Eroticism, Death, Music and Laughter in Thomas Mann and Friedrich Nietzsche. Amsterdam, Netherlands: Rodopi, 1999.

=== Selected publications ===
- Caroline Joan S. Picart, Countering Jihadi Cool and the Case of Raza v. City of New York, 12 Indiana Journal of Law and Social Equality 2 (Spring 2024), pp. 208–248.
- Caroline Joan S. Picart, Attempting to Go Beyond Forgetting: The Legacy of The Tokyo IMT and Crimes of Violence Against Women, (University of Pennsylvania) 7 East Asia L. Rev. January, 2012
- Caroline Joan S. Picart, A Tango between Copyright and Critical Race Theory: Whiteness as Status Property in Balanchine’s Ballets, Fuller’s Serpentine Dance and Graham’s Modern Dances, (Yeshiva University) 18 Cardozo Journal of Law & Gender 685 (April 2012)
- Caroline Joan S. Picart, Colloquium Proceedings: Critical Pedagogy, Race/Gender & Intellectual Property 48 California Western Law Review 493 (April 2012).
