= Haverty =

Haverty is a surname. Notable people with the surname include:

- J. J. Haverty (1858–1939), American businessman and art collector
- Joe Haverty, Irish footballer
- Joseph Patrick Haverty (1794–1864), Irish painter
- Martin Haverty (1809–1887), Irish journalist and historian
- Michael Haverty (born 1961), Irish hurler and referee
- Mike Haverty (born 1944), American railroad executive

== See also ==
- Havertys, American furniture retailer
