= Marino, Dublin =

Inner northern suburb of Dublin, Ireland

Marino An Mairíne (Irish)
- Suburb
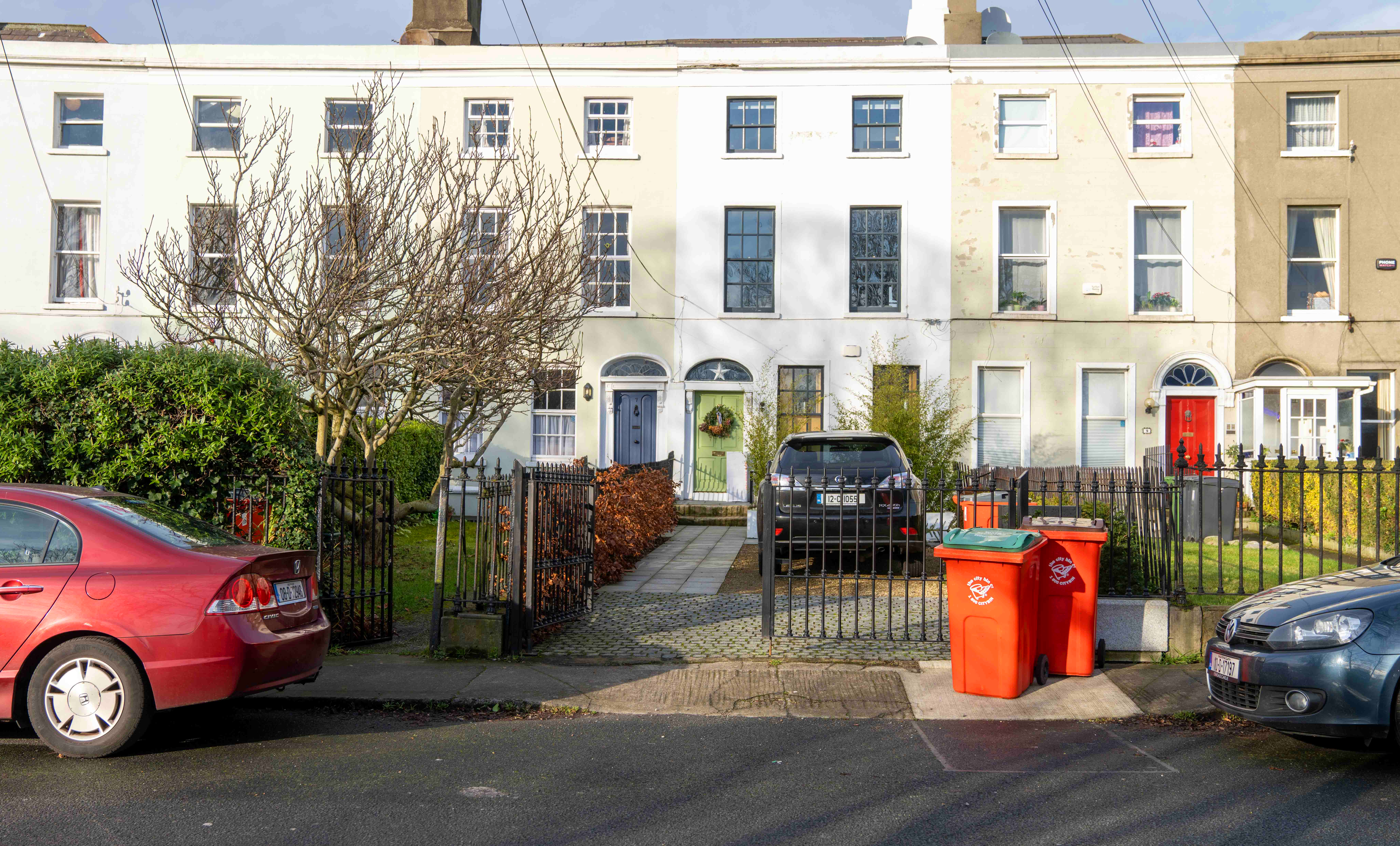
- The Georgian-era Marino Crescent

- Location in Dublin
- Coordinates: 53°21′54″N 6°13′48″W
- Country: Ireland
- Province: Leinster
- County: Dublin
- Council: Dublin City Council
- Dáil Éireann: Dublin Bay North
- European Parliament: Dublin
- Elevation: 4 m (13 ft)
- Website: marino.ie

Marino (Irish: An Mairíne) is an inner suburb on the Northside of Dublin, Ireland. It was built, in a planned form, on former grounds of Marino House, in an area between Drumcondra, Donnycarney, Clontarf, and what became Fairview. The initial development featured around 1,300 concrete-built houses.

The design of the new Marino development was heavily influenced by the Garden City Movement, which originated in the United Kingdom with Sir Ebenezer Howard. Howard's idea came from 19th-century writings which inspired him to build the opposite of the general urban conditions that existed at the time, hence building the "Garden City", to be "a perfect combination of rural and urban living". His book, To-morrow, a Peaceful Path to Real Reform (1898), was reprinted in 1902 titled Garden Cities of Tomorrow.

== Location and access ==
Marino roughly encompasses the area within the boundaries of Sion Hill Road, Gracepark Road, Philipsburgh Avenue (north of Lynch's), Malahide Road and Shelmartin Terrace. Marino borders other northside areas such as Fairview, Donnycarney and Clontarf. It is two kilometres from the GPO in O'Connell Street.

The area is served by the Clontarf Road DART station. Go-Ahead Ireland operate routes 73 and N2 through Marino, with other routes passing around its edges.

== History ==
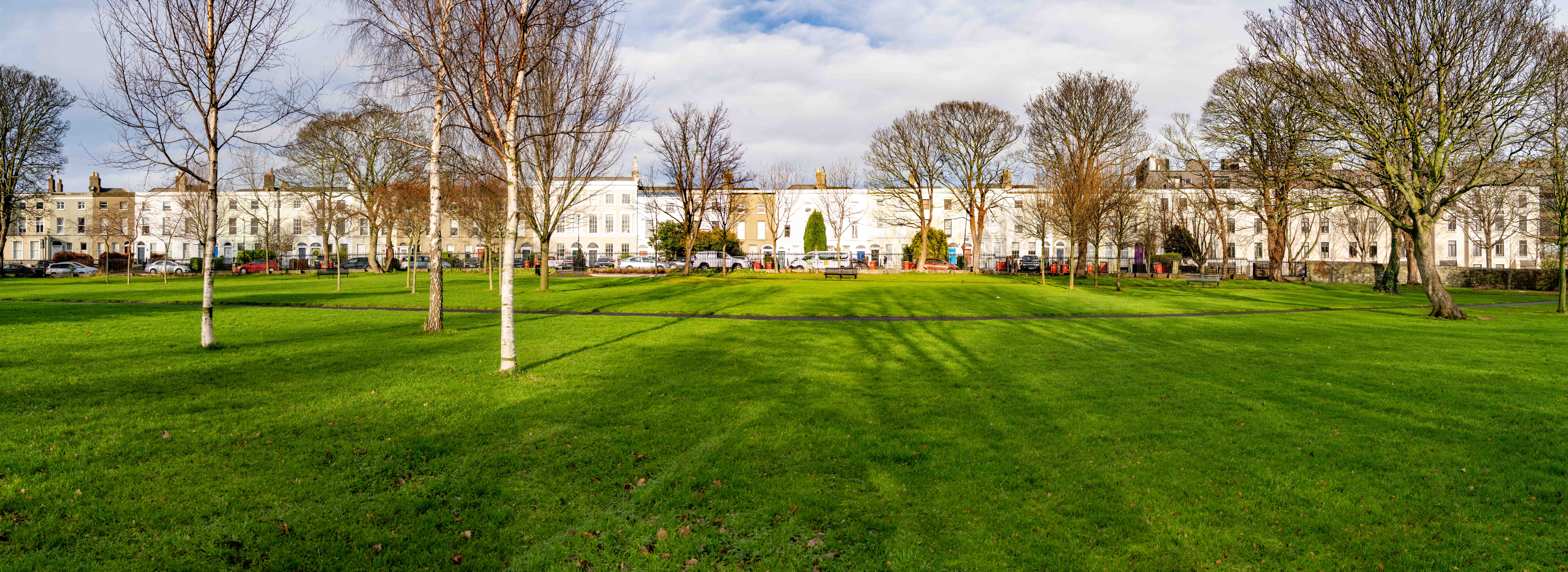
Marino Crescent as seen from Marino Crescent Park. Number 15 was the childhood home of Bram Stoker

=== Background ===
The townland of Marino was carved out of the townland of Donnycarney which was granted to the Corporation of Dublin following the dissolution of The Priory of All Hallows in the reign of King Henry VIII. In 1787, it was described by English writer Richard Lewis as "a small village a mile beyond Drumcondra and two-and-a-half miles from Dublin Castle."

The well-known Casino was built in 1759 as a summer house in the grounds of Marino House, demolished in the 1920s. A tunnel linking it to the main house for servants' use is where Michael Collins and his men carried out tests with their first Thompson sub-machine gun. The Asgard guns are believed to have been hidden here. The area was full of members of the Irish Citizens' Army. Jim Larkin lived in Croydon Park House and Countess Markiewicz and James Connolly were frequent visitors.

=== Planned development ===
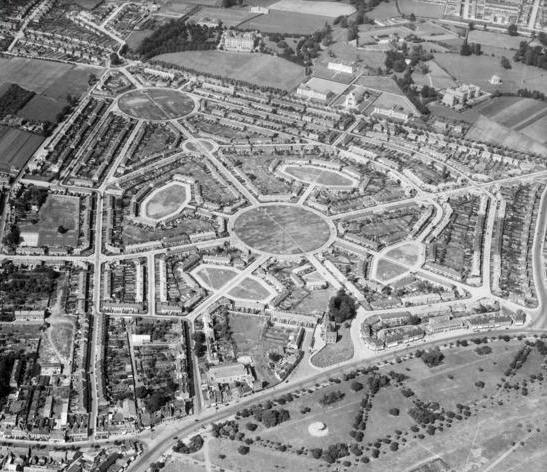
An aerial view of Marino shortly after its construction

The area was developed for housing in the late 1920s and 1930s on the former estate lands of the Earl of Charlemont in the civil parish of Clonturk (now Marino, Fairview, and Drumcondra). It is notable as one of the first examples, in the newly formed Irish state, of an affordable housing project and was the first local authority housing estate in the country. It is heavily influenced by the garden city movement. When it was first built, purchases of houses were restricted to large families, while alcohol, dogs without leads, and children after dark were banned from the parks.

The area had been identified in the 1900s as a potential area for housing development, and in 1910 a proposal was successfully made to the Dublin Corporation to build housing on the 50-acre site at the cost of £50,000. In the 1910s concerns were raised about the current leaseholder and the ground rent due to them, and if the site was too far from the centres of employment in the city. After the Housing Inquiry of 1913 more plans were advanced, but with political instability in Ireland and World War I, any scheme was deemed too costly for the Corporation to both acquire land and build on it. In a 1918 report on housing development in the north of Dublin, areas were identified for such developments including Marino, Cabra, and the docklands.

Dublin Corporation had received a State grant of £1 million to fund this new housing scheme. Prior to the State intervening, the building of new dwellings for the working class was left to philanthropic groups such as the Dublin Artisans' Dwellings Company. The development as a garden suburb was an attempt to shift from flat dwellings, located centrally and which were heavily overcrowded, to more suburban working-class dwellings, hence reducing the high density of people, and furthermore reducing the spread of common diseases.

The scheme was originally designed by Frederick Hicks and H.T. O'Rourke. Originally, Charles McCarthy, the city architect, proposed a new scheme of 600 houses on a 50-acre site with a density of 12 houses to the acre. However, in 1919, O’Rourke, McCarthy's assistant and successor, presented the plans the reflected Howard's garden city idea. The houses were built by private contractors, H. & J. Martin, G&T Crampton, John Kenny and Paul Kossel, a German firm. The hiring of German builders to build a portion of the houses at Marino was due to a labour strike because of the lack of union recognition, causing controversy. The houses each cost between £550 and £590 to build (approximately €40,000 at today's costs). the average selling price was £450. This £450 was repayable over 40 years. All houses as part of the scheme at Marino were sold in 1925, with priority given to larger families with more than eight persons.

Plans were preliminarily designed in 1911, to develop better quality housing on the edges of the development, in order to maintain a good image of the area, but as construction began, this plan was quickly disallowed as each house had to meet the same financial criteria. The Corporation gained ownership of the proposed area in 1915 and a solution became available. The outer houses were to be part of a public-private partnership as the Dublin Corporation gave incentives for private companies to invest and develop better quality housing on the surround of the Garden suburb. The plans included having the houses in a "radial plan" and all facing onto a large circular green. Each housing block was to have a different front in order to relieve the repetition of the same façade. Along with area for companies to invest and develop property/businesses were allotments. Marino Plotholders' Association was created and ensured that the Allotments Act was followed, in that, they would make local authorities to set aside land for allotments to grow vegetables, and then sell the surplus. The need for allotments was great, especially during war, when the importation of food was scarce. However, when the food shortage was over the land was then used for housing.

The large circular green at the heart of the development, Marino Park, had adjoining symmetrical green areas such as Marino Green, while the green area in the middle of Croydon Park Avenue is known locally as the "D" walls, that give the area a highly distinctive character when seen from the air. Further schemes followed similar patterns, with regards to building these suburban working-class settlements - one in Drumcondra, for example, followed the same initiative but with more focus on owner-occupancy. These houses were slightly different, with slightly smaller housing styles, often of a two-bedroom and one living room configuration, and similar garden size for each house.

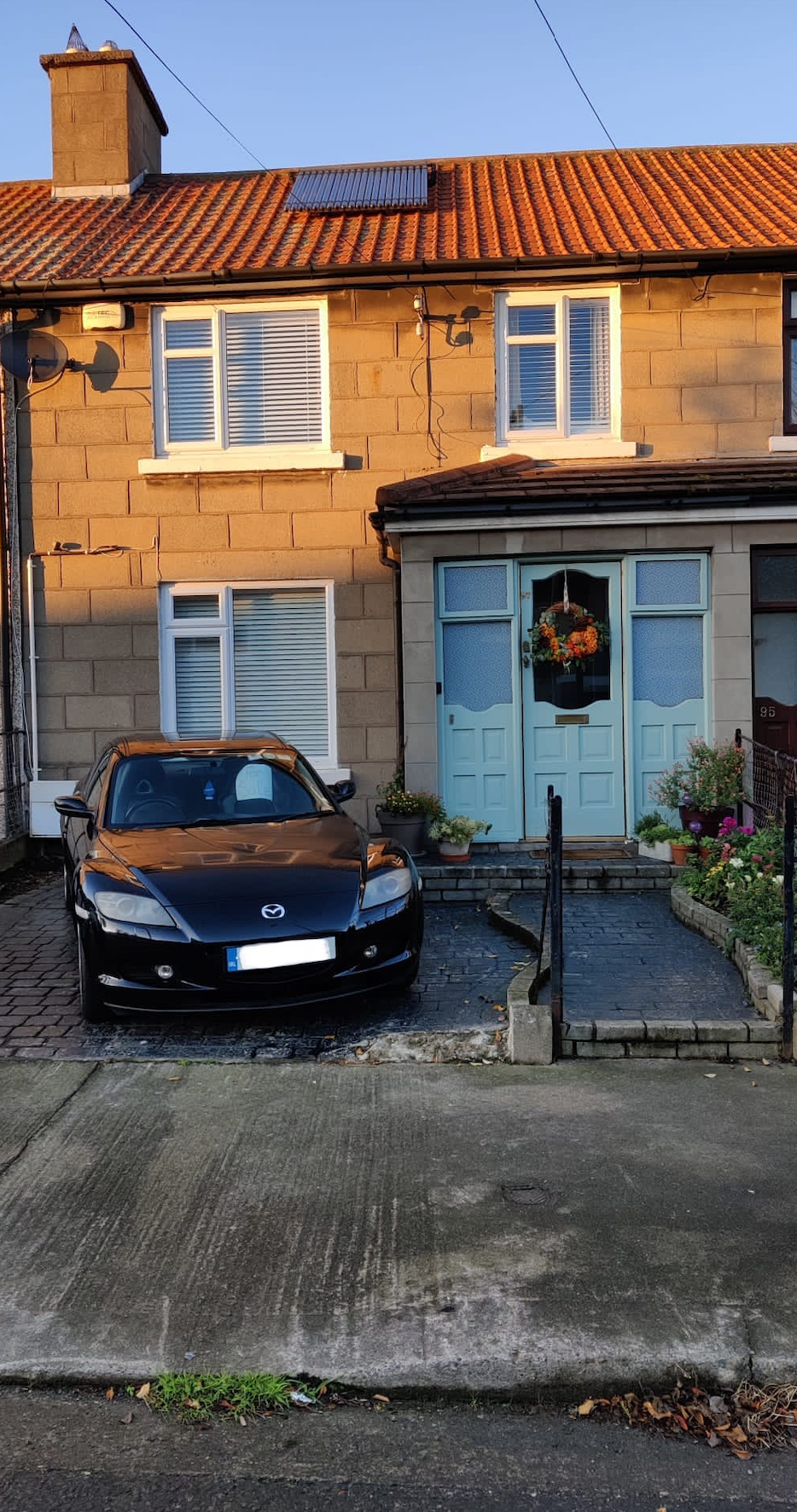
Converted driveway (previously a garden), Marino, November 2022.

Today, the area consists of about 1,300 houses built for the most part of concrete, which was an unusual building material at that time in Ireland. Some of the homes' upstairs rooms still have asbestos ceilings, which will need to be removed when buying these old buildings. The short term effects of asbestos are lung cancer, mesothelioma and pleural disorders such as pleural plaques, therefore, this old building material needs to be removed from the builds which would be an added price on the cost of buying property in this inner suburb of Dublin. Previous residents from the early 20th century would still recognise the area, little has changed physically since then. However, when Marino was initially built, an area to park cars was not required, therefore residents today have converted their front gardens to driveways, as seen in the image, the original gate for pedestrians still remains.

It is also now considered close to the city centre, within walking distance, however, a lot of bus transfers go through Fairview/Marino which bring you into the city centre for example the bus routes 27, 15, 14, 42, 43 etc. As of 2011, 3,000 people live in Marino, an almost 70 per cent drop from when it was built almost 100 years ago with a population of 10,000, presumably due to a decrease in family size in the 21st century. Not only has the population density changed but the population's demographic, the working population of Marino is now mainly in the managerial and technical sector.

== Amenities ==
Marino is home to schools including St Vincent de Paul Infants' and Girls' National School, Scoil Mhuire CBS and Ard Scoil Rís Secondary School, which are all located on Griffith Avenue, next to the parish church. Along Philipsburgh Avenue there is a strip of shops that serve the local people of Marino including a small supermarket, pharmacy, bakery, hairdressers and butchers.

Marino is also home to Marino Institute of Education (MIE) which is a huge part of the suburban area as it offers a broad range of courses with over 1,300 students. It is located just North of the planned Garden city, along Griffith Avenue. Marino is also an approximately 20-minute walk to DCU All Hallows Campus and 30-minute walk to DCU St Patrick's Campus.

Marino is home to St Vincent's GAA Club, based at Pairc Naomh Uinsionn just off Malahide Road, bordering Donnycarney. St Vincent's has produced many notable football and hurling players over the years. The club fields successful senior sides and has a thriving juvenile section which caters for close to one thousand boys and girls. Marino AFC plays soccer on one of the greens. Marino/Fairview CY/LYMC is a pitch and putt and social club on Philipsburgh Avenue.

Carlton Hall Community Centre, located on Shelmartin Avenue, provides the local community with many facilities including hosting karate and other sport and social classes. The Order of Malta Ambulance Corps has a unit in Marino which provides first aid cover to local events.

== The Casino at Marino ==
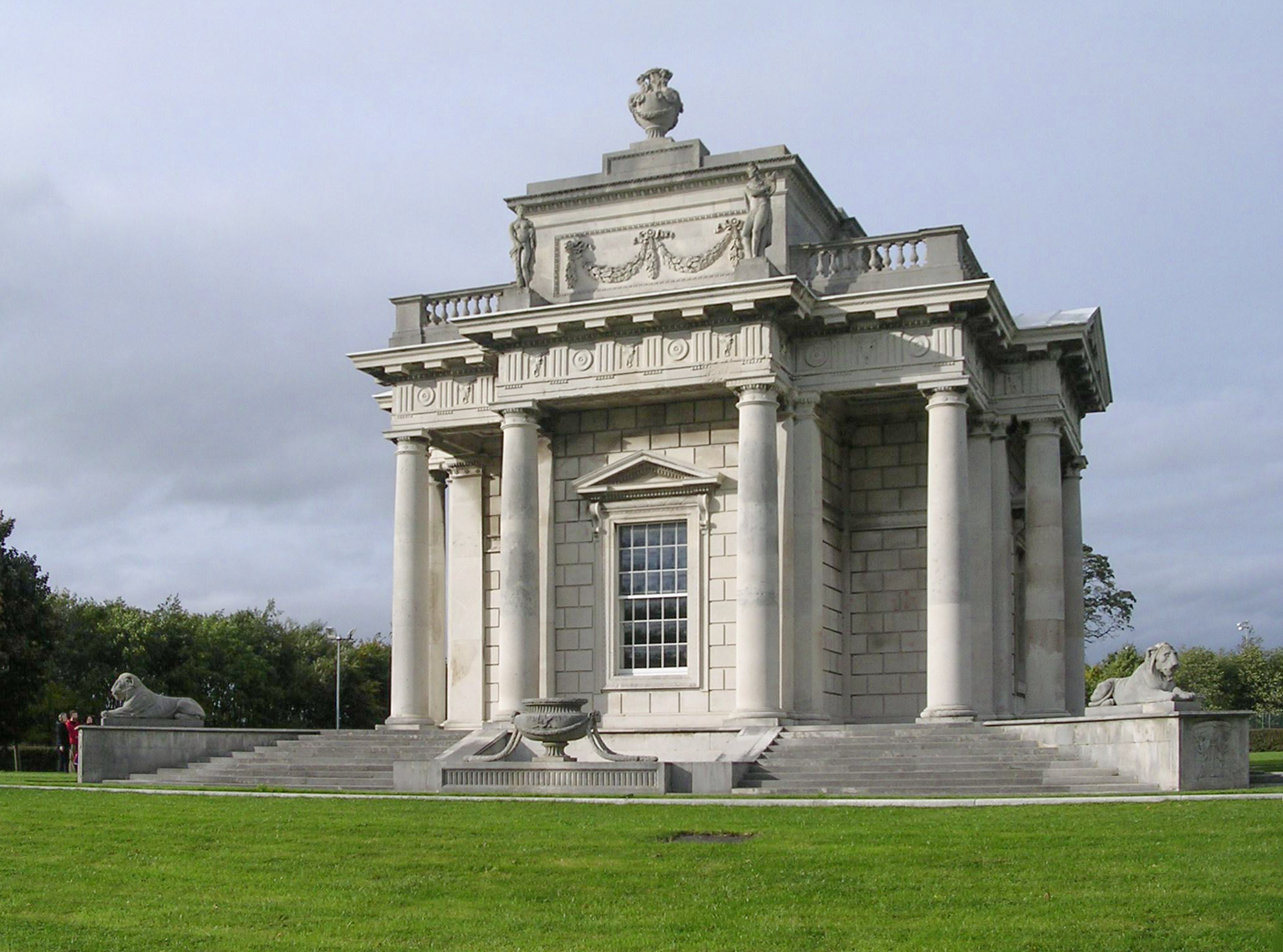
The Casino at Marino

The Casino is a famous piece of Irish neo-classical architecture. It was designed by William Chambers as a pleasure house for James Caulfeild, 1st Earl of Charlemont. It is regarded as one of the finest 18th-century neo-classical buildings in Europe. The Casino, meaning "small house", contains a total of 16 finely decorated rooms. It is maintained by the Office of Public Works and is open to the public annually from April to October, with an admission charge.

== Notable people ==
- Florence Balcombe, wife of novelist Bram Stoker
- Billie Barry, founder of the eponymous stage school, lived on St Declan's Road
- Harry Boland, basketball player, lived at 5 Marino Crescent
- William Carleton, novelist, lived at 3 Marino Crescent
- James Caulfeild, 18th century peer
- Dermot Desmond, businessman
- Liam Ferguson, hurler
- John Francis Flynn, folk singer
- P. J. Gallagher, comedian and broadcaster
- Fintan Gavin, Roman Catholic prelate, current Bishop of Cork and Ross
- Martin Haverty, journalist and historian
- Tom Jordan, actor
- James Larkin, trade unionist, lived in Croydon House
- Ruth Medjber, photographer
- Cathal O'Shannon, journalist and broadcaster
- Frank Robbins, revolutionary and trade unionist
- Michael Ryan, broadcaster
- John Sheahan, member of The Dubliners
- Alex White, lawyer and former TD and minister
- Steve Wickham, musician

== Religion ==
Marino is a parish in the Fingal South East deanery of the Roman Catholic Archdiocese of Dublin. It is served by the Church of St Vincent de Paul.
