= Fairview, Dublin =

Northern suburb of Dublin, Ireland

Fairview Fionnradharc (Irish)
- Suburb
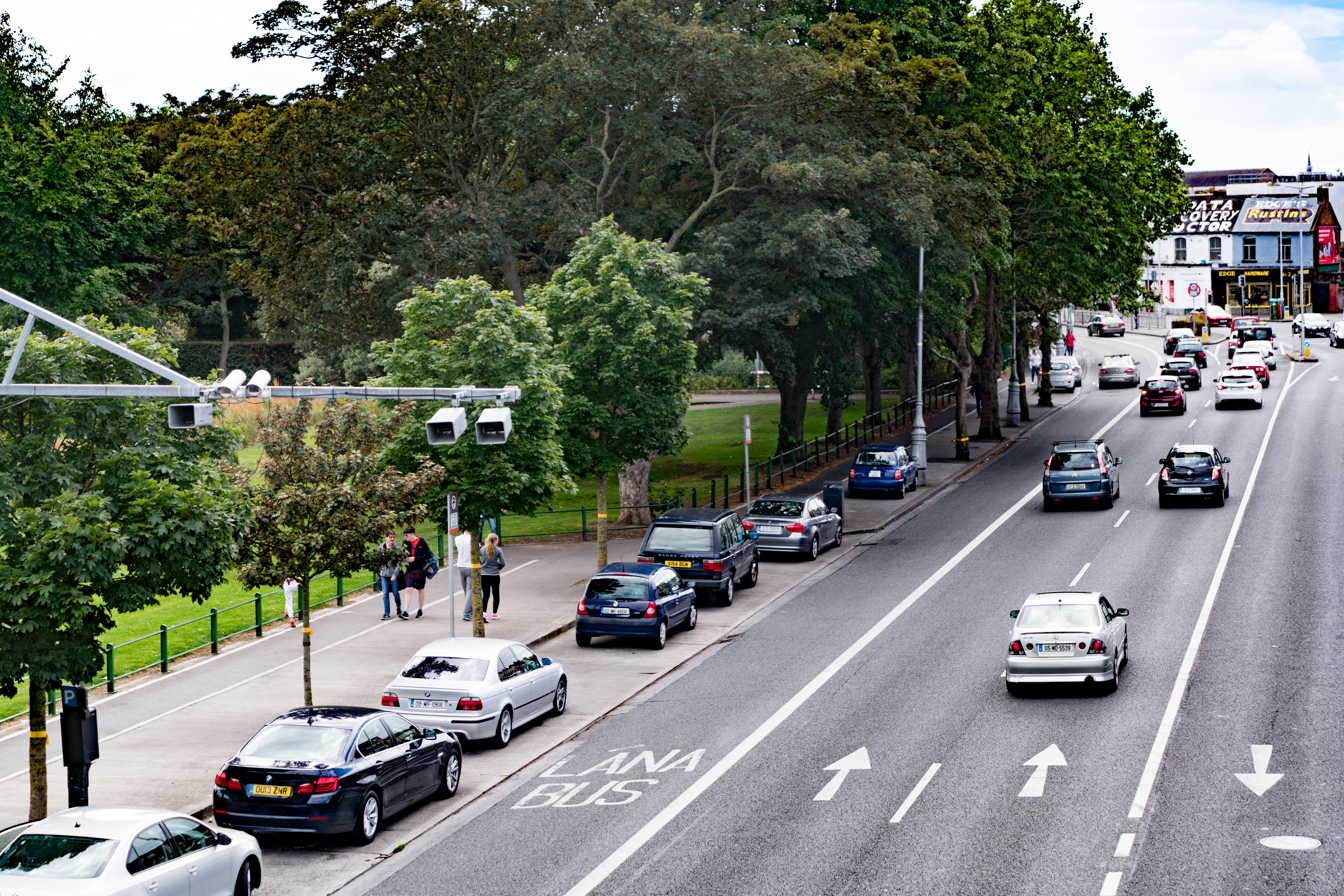
- Fairview pictured from a pedestrian bridge, with Fairview Park to the left

- Location in Ireland
- Coordinates: 53°21′54″N 6°13′48″W
- Country: Ireland
- Province: Leinster
- County: County Dublin
- Local authority: Dublin City Council
- Elevation: 4 m (13 ft)
- Time zone: UTC+0 (WET)
  - Summer (DST): UTC-1 (IST (WEST))
- Eircode routing key: D03

Fairview (Irish: Fionnradharc) is a coastal inner suburb of Dublin, Ireland. It lies within the jurisdiction of Dublin City Council. Part of the area forms Fairview Park, a recreational amenity laid out on land reclaimed from the sea.

== Toponymy ==
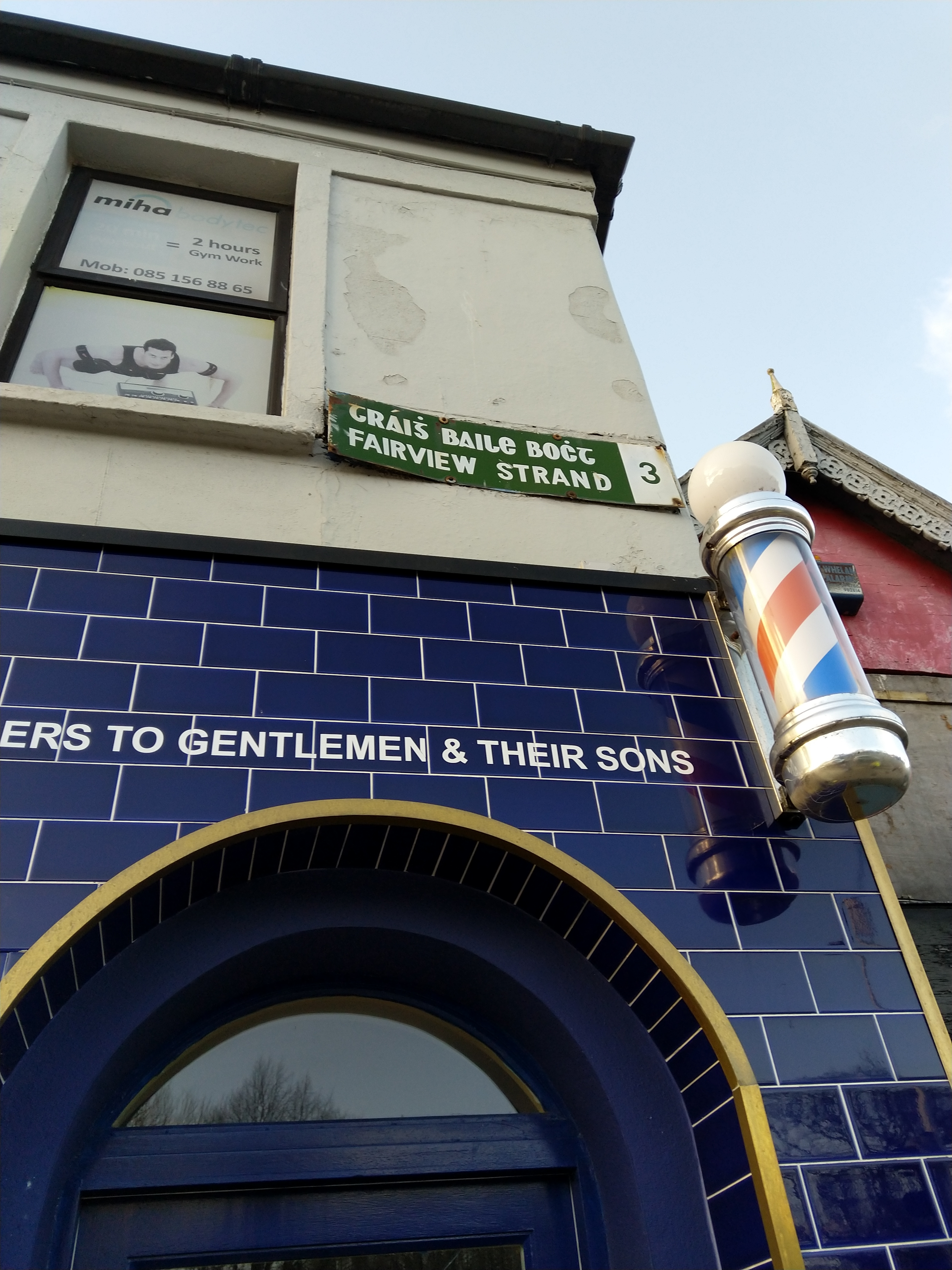
Fairview Strand street sign using Baile Bocht

Until the end of the 18th century, the area, much smaller before reclamation, was labelled Ballybough, with many street signs still giving the Irish name of the area as Baile Bocht - that name is now limited to the suburb on the other side of the River Tolka. The Catholic parish of Fairview was created in 1879, when it was separated from Clontarf, reputedly named for the local church, Our Lady of Fair View dedicated to Our Lady of Pulchro Aspectu vulgo Fairview in 1819. Administratively, Fairview and Marino were part of the old townland of Clonturk, which also included Drumcondra.

== History ==
Along with large areas of Ballybough, Dorset Street, Clonliffe Road and Lower Drumcondra, much of Fairview was part of the farmland owned by St Mary's Abbey in the 14th century. During the dissolution of the monasteries, St Mary's was given to Earl of Desmond and the tithes of the area then known as Ballybough were given to William Howth. The area was later owned by a proprietor, John Bathe. The Bathe family held large areas of land for a long period, including Drumcondra Castle, until the end of the reign of Charles I, with Walter Peppard leasing Ballybough and the area now known as Fairview. After the 1641 Rebellion and the following wars, the population of Fairview remained low.

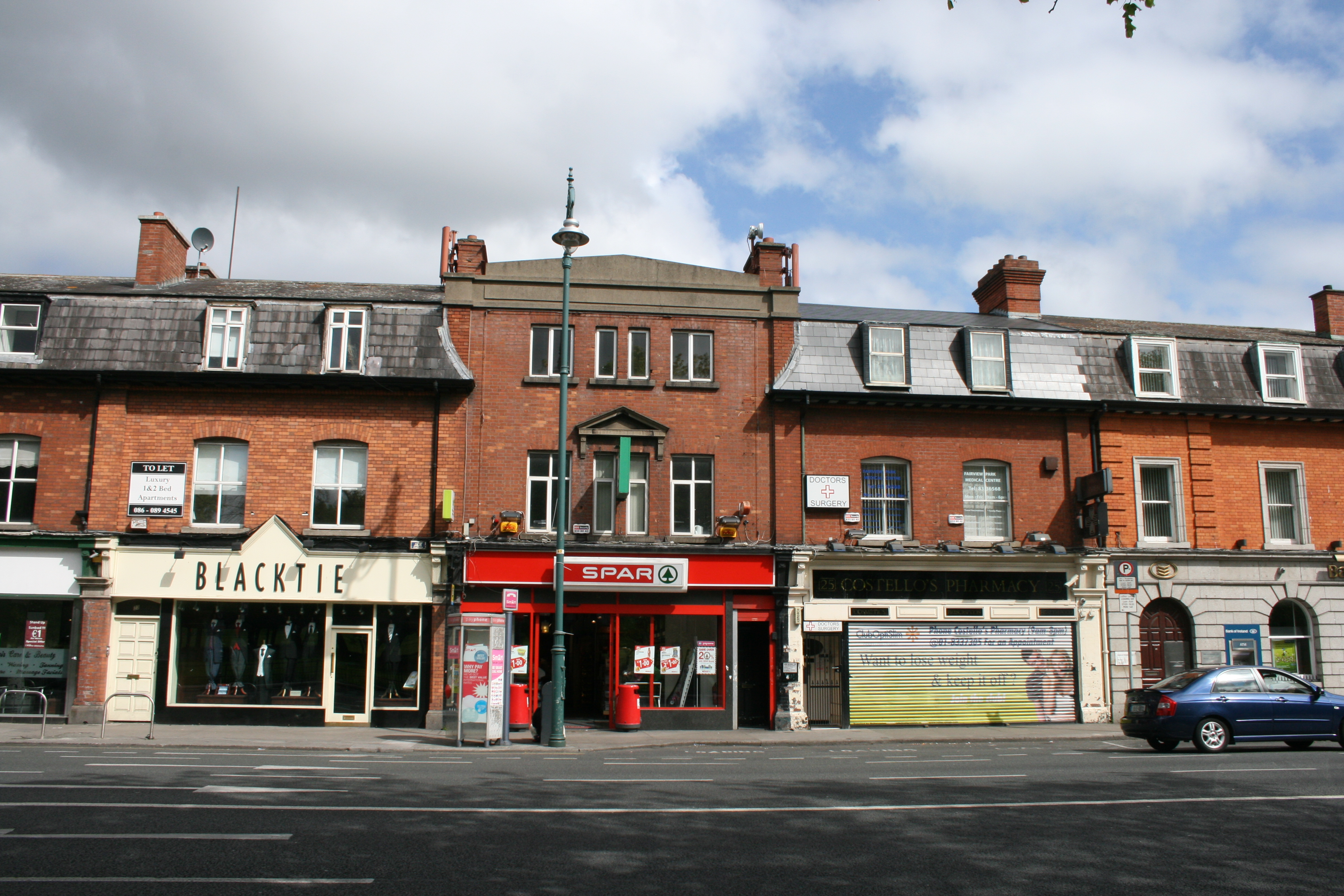
Central Fairview

Around 1718, one of Dublin's earliest Jewish communities was established in the area, then known as Annadale. The communities originated in Portugal and Spain, and came to Dublin during the Cromwellian era due to his regime's tolerance of Jews. They were escaping the Spanish Inquisition and initially settled near Crane Lane in Dublin city. Their settlement at Annadale was connected to Fairview by Ellis's Lane, which later became Philipsburgh Avenue from the mid-1700s. The community left the area, moving to the south side of the city, in the late 1800s and early 1900s. On Fairview Strand, near Luke Kelly bridge, is Dublin's oldest Jewish Cemetery, Ballybough Cemetery. The graveyard was built in 1718 on land leased on a peppercorn rent from Chichester Phillips, but it was a different, prominent Jew also named Philips for whom Philipsburgh Avenue is most likely named. The mortuary chapel was added in 1857 and contains more than 200 graves. The last burial there was in 1958. Before the extension of Philipsburg Avenue for the Marino housing estate, the northern end was a lane called Sally Park. In the mid-1800s, it is reputed there was a Baptist chapel and congregation on Philipsburgh Avenue.

Richmond Road connects Fairview with Drumcondra on the northern side of the Tolka and was laid out to provide access to Drumcondra Castle. The thoroughfare was a laneway until reputedly a jeweller and merchant, Francis Jacob Grose, built a house called Richmond House in the mid-1700s, from which the road is thought to take its name. His house was on the site now occupied by St. Vincent's Hospital. Kingston suggests that he named his house after Richmond, London, and that his building of his house in this area led to it becoming more fashionable with the merchant class. Grose's son was the antiquarian, Francis Grose, who is buried at Drumcondra Church. Richmond House was bought by the Daughters of Charity and incorporated into St Vincent's. Kingston reports that reputedly some Huguenots who sought refuge in Dublin built houses along the Richmond Road.

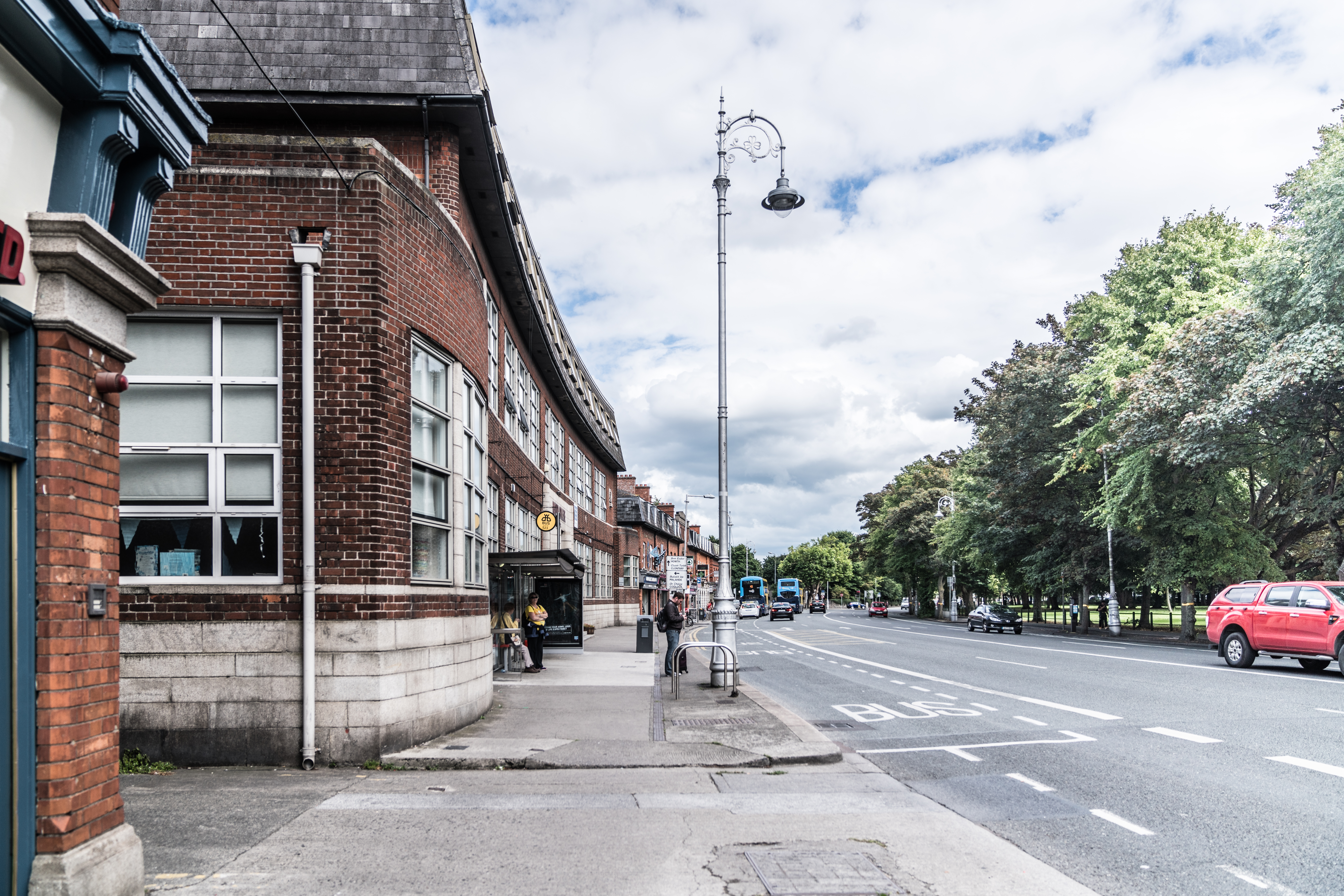
Fairview Strand, Fairview

From the end of the 1700s, industries were established in the area, in particular the manufacture of flint glass. One factory was established by Philip Roche. A factory near Ballybough Bridge made glass for Dublin Castle and Chebsey's glass house produced a chandelier for the Irish Houses of Parliament with 1233 glass pieces. The density of such factories resulted in Factory Lane, which is now Esmonde Avenue. During the reign of James II, the Fairview area was owned by Chicester Phillips and Sir John Eccles. Due to the extensive tidal areas which encompassed the area up the Fairview Strand at this time, there were not many houses built in the area, with the Clontarf strand much more popular for houses and recreation. After the closure of the glass factories, the Coghills of Drumcondra established a green to bleach linen on the Richmond Road which was later replaced with a factory for printing linen. This factory was admired by Mary Delany. Fairview's population was still small, but some notable residents began to move to the area including Joseph Dioderice, the maternal grandfather of Thomas Elrington, in 1748. In 1787 Fairview was described as containing "very neat and elegant houses".

Fairview began to grow after the building of Annesley Bridge in 1797 opened up easy access to the land. Until 1797 there had been no crossing of the River Tolka below Ballybough Bridge. Fairview Strand was formally known as Owen Roe Terrace and Philipsburgh Strand. The boundary of Fairview and the area now known as Marino, but historically part of Donnycarney, was delineated by the walls of the demesne of Marino House along Fairview Strand. The house and most of its surrounds are now demolished, apart from the Casino at Marino and the original Georgian entrance gates which have been relocated to Griffith Avenue.

Annadale House was located in an estate that now comprises Melrose Avenue, Lomond Avenue, Waverly Avenue and Inverness Road. Cadogan and Addison Roads were built in the mid-1800s and were named for Dublin peers. A number of Georgian houses have since been demolished including Mulberry Lodge, Pennyville, and Woodlands. A Carmelite monastery once stood on Fairview Avenue, on the site of Fairview cinema. Pennyville was a small estate at the end of Fairview Avenue which was later known as Croydon Park. Bushfield House has survived and stands on Philipsburgh Avenue. It was previously known as Cutaldo and dates from c. 1790. From the 1840s, houses were built on Richmond Avenue, which was seen as a fashionable area. The area which is now Merville Avenue was known as the Big Gun after a local tavern. When Fairview Church was opened in 1855, there were 20 houses on Fairview Strand, two on Windsor Avenue and 41 houses on Philipsburgh Avenue. The horse trams and later the railway trams which crossed over Annesley Bridge and ran up to Clontarf increased the accessibility of Fairview.

From 1832 to 1909, 89 Fairview Strand was a Royal Irish Constabulary Barracks and the now demolished Erlington House was home to Thomas Erlington and later the opera singer Josephine O'Brien. A burial area for those who died by suicide is thought to have been located at the boundary of Fairview and Ballybough, at the corner of Clonliffe Avenue and the Ballybough Road, and is cited as one of the inspirations for Bram Stoker's Dracula.

The Fairview Grand cinema was a single (and later twin) screen cinema at 18 Fairview. It opened on the 18 November 1929 with a showing of The Trail of '98, a Klondike gold rush adventure film. It was designed by Henry J. Lyons and had a capacity of 1,400 by 1933. Established by Leonard E. Ging, the building is unusual as the auditorium is set far back from the street, connected with a long lobby and corridor to fit the cinema into a constrained site at the street. The last public film showing was on 19 June 1974, after which it operated as a private screening cinema. By 2007, it was the Buena Vista Screening Theatre, with the front section of the building used as offices for a newspaper above and a small supermarket at ground level. Part of the auditorium at the back has since been demolished.

== Location ==
Modern-day Fairview is a inner suburb of Dublin. It stretches north-east from the River Tolka to Clontarf Road DART station, along Fairview Park to the south and the red brick Victorian part of Philipsburgh Avenue to the north. It is bounded by Marino, which was developed in 1924 on the former estate lands of Lord Charlemont. The grounds of St. Vincent's Hospital, Fairview and Drumcondra are to the west.

Neighbouring districts include Marino to the north, North Strand and Ballybough to the west, East Wall to the south-west and Clontarf to the east.

== Governance ==
Fairview is in the administrative area of Dublin City Council. It lies in the Dublin North Central Dáil constituency and the Clontarf Local Electoral Area for city council elections. It is served by the Fairview Residents Association.

== Public services ==
A Garda Síochána station is located in nearby Clontarf; a Dublin Fire Brigade station, with ambulances is located in North Strand, just across the Tolka at Annesley Bridge. A credit union is located on Fairview Strand, and a Post Office on Marino Mart. Dublin City Libraries have a branch in Marino Secondary School, on the main road in Fairview.

== Education ==
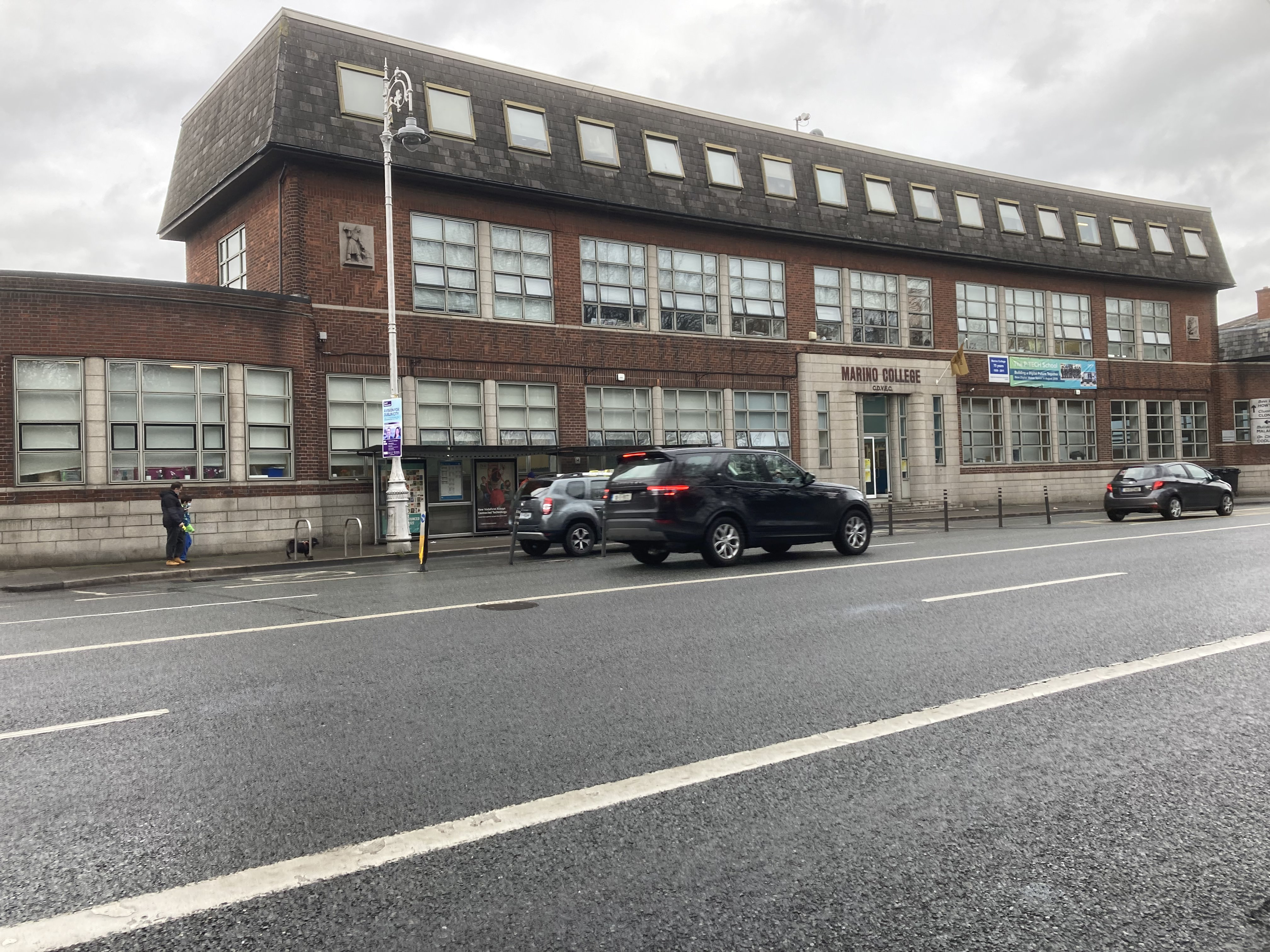
Marino college

Past pupils of St. Joseph's Secondary C.B.S., Fairview include former Taoiseach, Charles Haughey. The secondary school Marino College is in nearby Marino. St. Marys national school for girls is close to Richmond Road.

== Transport ==
Fairview lies on a main road artery from the city centre, via North Strand, which continues on as the Malahide, Howth and Clontarf Roads.

The area is served by the Clontarf Road DART station, which provides services between Drogheda and Greystones, via Connolly and Pearse stations.

The area can also be reached by way of several Dublin Bus routes from the city centre, including 14, 15, 27/A/B/N/X, 29A/N, 31/B, 32/A/B/X, 42/N, 43, 123, 130 and the H bus corridor. It includes the segregated cycle path which links Amiens Street with Sutton.

== Religion ==
Fairview is a parish in the Fingal South East deanery of the Roman Catholic Archdiocese of Dublin. It is served by the Church of Visitation of the Blessed Virgin Mary. The construction of this church began in 1853 and it was opened on 15 January 1855.

Fairview Hall, at 13 Annesley Bridge Road, is part of the Gospel Hall Brethren local assembly.

== Amenities ==
Edge's Hardware on the eponymous Edge's Corner in 2023

The main commercial areas are Fairview, a busy road alongside Fairview Park and Fairview Strand, a narrower commercial and residential strip running from Edge's Corner around to Luke Kelly Bridge.

St Vincent's Hospital was founded by the Daughters of Charity in 1857. Located on Richmond Road, it provides psychiatric services for the north-east quadrant of Dublin city.

== Parks ==
Fairview Park
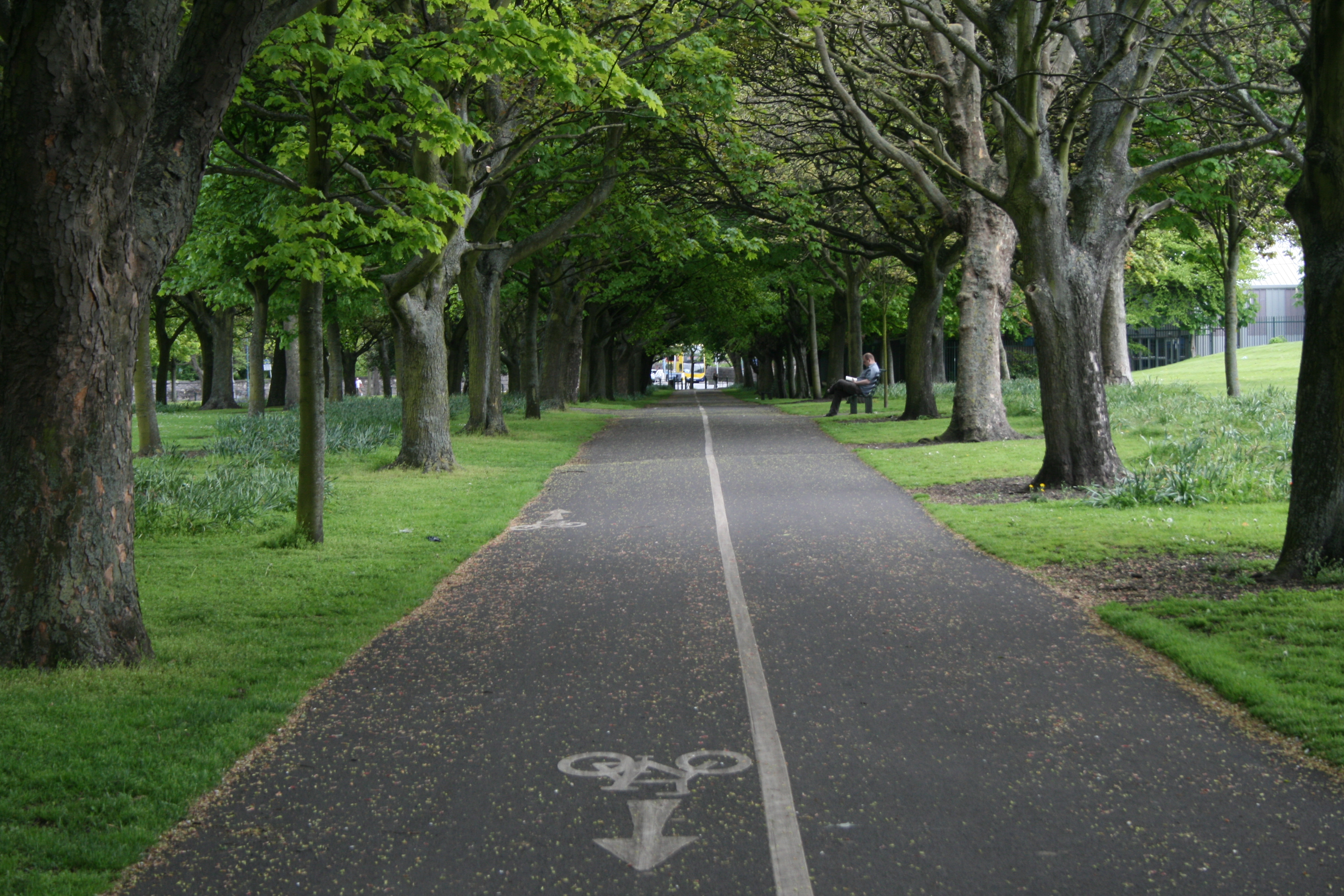
- Fairview Park
- Interactive map of Fairview Park
- Type: Urban park
- Location: Fairview, Dublin
- Coordinates: 53°21′42″N 6°13′56″W
- Area: 20 hectares (49 acres)
- Created: 1934
- Operator: Office of Public Works
- Open: All year

Fairview Park (Irish: Páirc Fionnradharc) has playing fields, a children's playground, tree-lined walks, a 400-metre athletics track and a Comhaltas Ceoltóirí Éireann hall. The Tolka and Fairview DART depot border the park to the south and east respectively; Clontarf Road station is located nearby.

It was originally a tidal mud flat, which was used for land fill in the early 1900s. From 1907, refuse was dumped straight into the slob land, with offensive material incinerated on Stanley Street before the ash was brought back to Fairview by tramway wagons to be dumped. It was because of this that Fairview Park was occasionally called Ash Park. It was originally thought that it would take 20 years to fill the area as part of the Fairview Improvement Grounds, but due to the high volume of material, it was full in ten years with waste to a depth of 2.66 yd (2.43 m), with residents dissatisfied with the resulting odour. Rubble from some of the buildings destroyed during the Easter Rising as said to have been brought to the park. The name Aberdeen Park initially suggested for Lord Aberdeen who was Lord Lieutenant of Ireland when the park was first planned. Lord Ardilaun suggested the name of Fairview Park.

Initial tree planting began with 55 trees planted during a ceremony on 31 October 1908, in response to the locals complaining of the smell from the landfill. More trees were donated by Thomas Picton-Bradshaw of Mount Temple in 1909; of these, 64 London plane trees were planned to be felled during the development of a bicycle lane through Fairview in the 2020s, but local protests resulted in only ten trees being removed.

The park was developed in the late 1920s, with Dublin Corporation's Streets Committee allocated £1000 in 1924 to create "a detailed plan of proposals." The only part of these plans to be implemented as a 20 ft (6.1 m) wide path from Annesley Bridge to opposite the Howth Road. Other suggested elements were added later, including railings, flowerbeds and playing grounds, but not to these original plans. The "By-Laws regulating the use and enjoyment of Fairview Park" were formally adopted by Dublin Corporation in 1934.

The park contains a mix of trees including Norway maple, birch, beech, horse-chestnut, poplar, evergreen oak and flowering cherry. A sessile oak was planted during National Tree Week 2012 to mark 50 years of music by The Dubliners. Previously, the park had large seasonal flower borders near the bandstand and children's playground.

A memorial statue of Seán Russell was unveiled by Cumann Uaigheann Na Laochra Gael, in Fairview Park, on 9 September 1951. A new statue of him was erected in May 2009 after the original was beheaded by "LGBT and anti-Nazi groups" in 2005. The park also features a sculpture by Joe Moran, Family Unit 1, which was commissioned in 1988. Alongside a number of other sites, Fairview Park was considered as a location for the Garden of Remembrance in the early 1970s.

On 19 March 1983, prior to the first Dublin Pride parade, a march was held from Liberty Hall to Fairview Park. This was in response to the murder of Declan Flynn in the park and the resulting trial.

The park was temporarily reduced in size during the 2000s, due to the development of the Dublin Port Tunnel, the entrance to which is approximately 1 km (0.6 mi) beyond the park perimeter. The park has since been restored; it contains two small playgrounds and a larger one that includes a skate park. The bandstand was removed during the construction. After this redevelopment, the planting in the park moved from seasonal displays to more pollinator-friendly native species.

A weekly 5 km (3.1 mi) Parkrun takes place on Saturday mornings, with an average of 188 participants in 2026. The park contains several association football pitches; both Sheriff Y.C. and Belvedere play their home games here.

Bram Stoker Park is a small roughly circular park, located in front of the Georgian terrace of Marino Crescent; both the park and the street are technically in a pocket of neighbouring Clontarf. Stoker was born at 15 Marino Crescent.

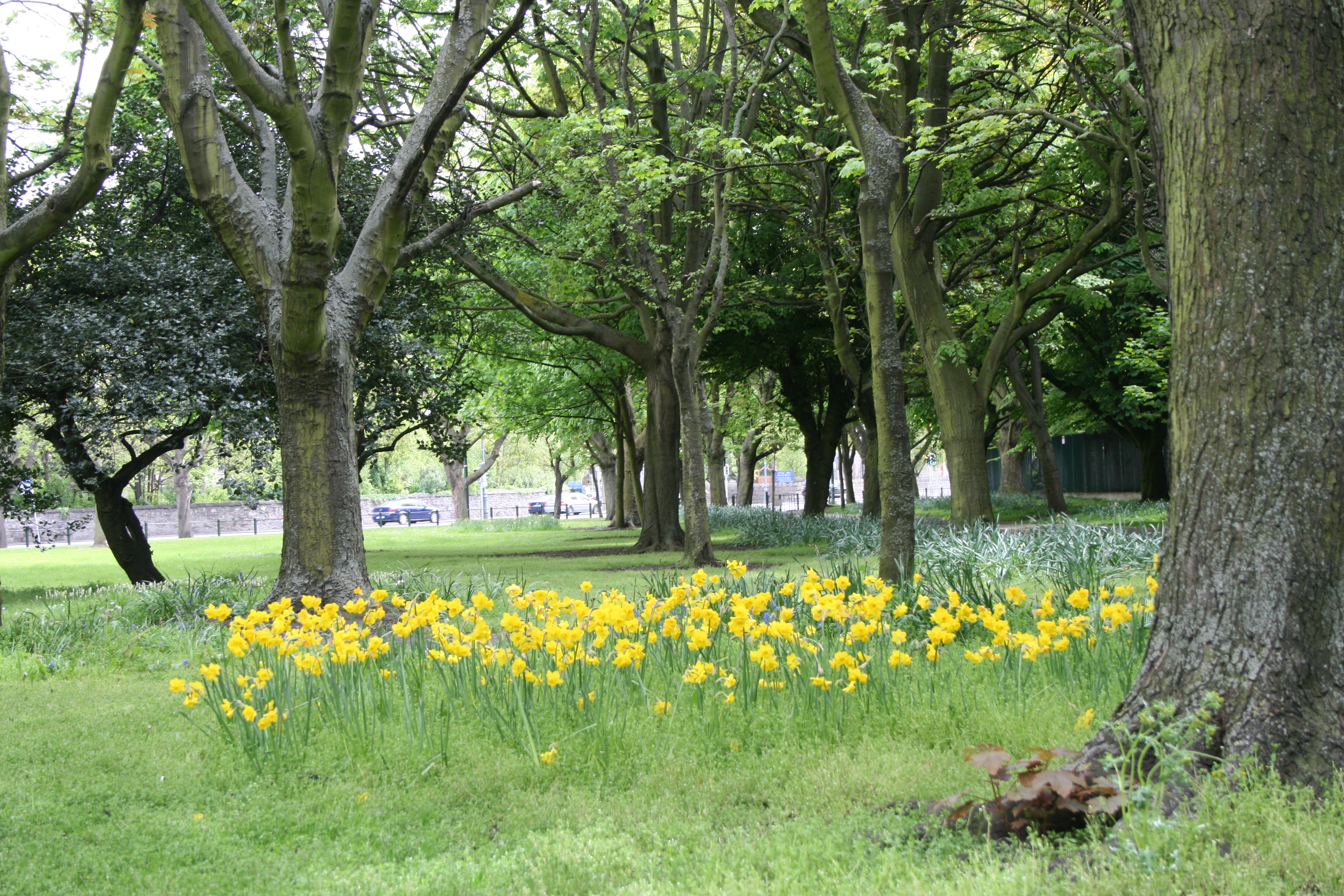
Flowers in Fairview Park

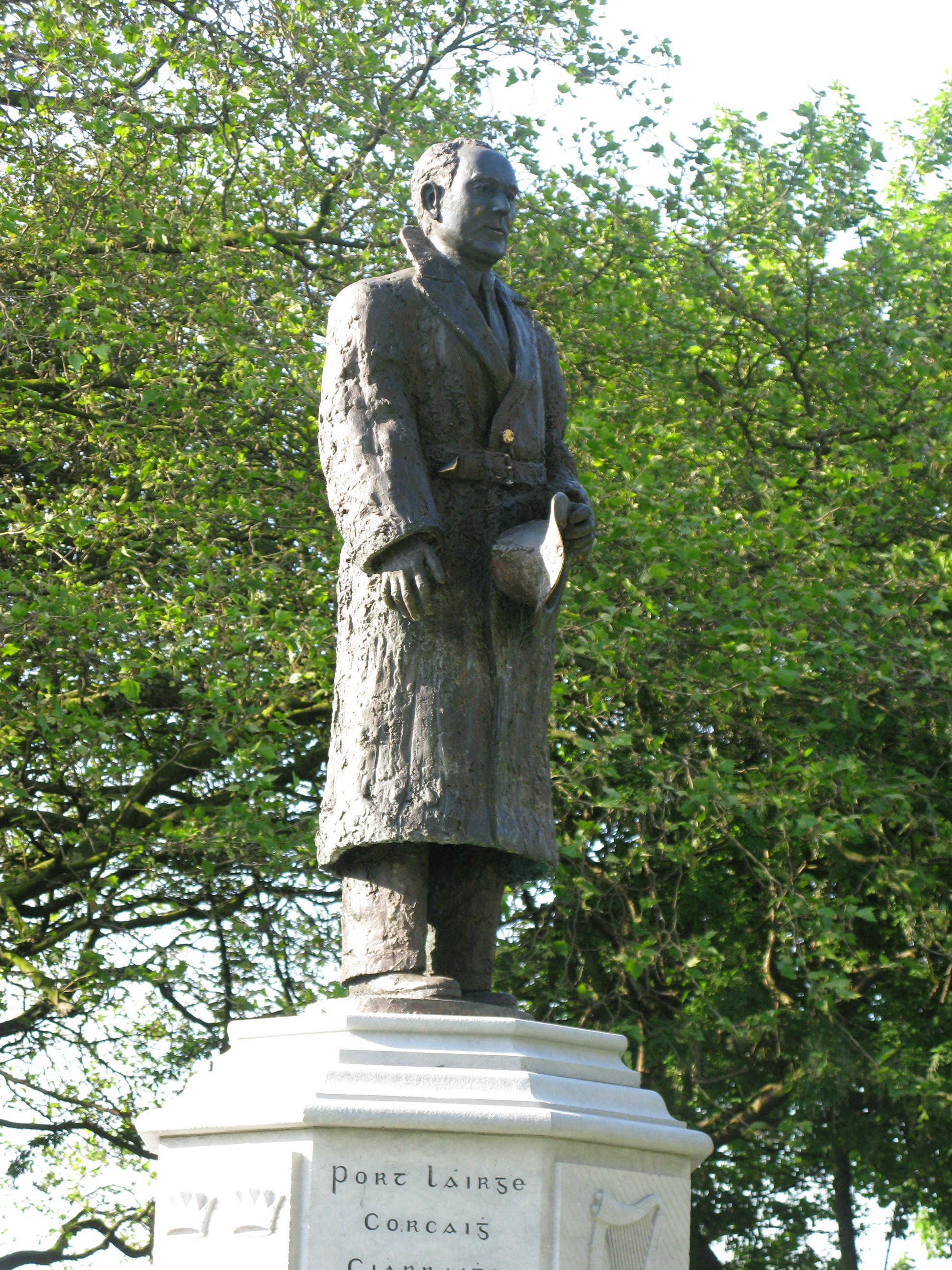
Statue of Seán Russell

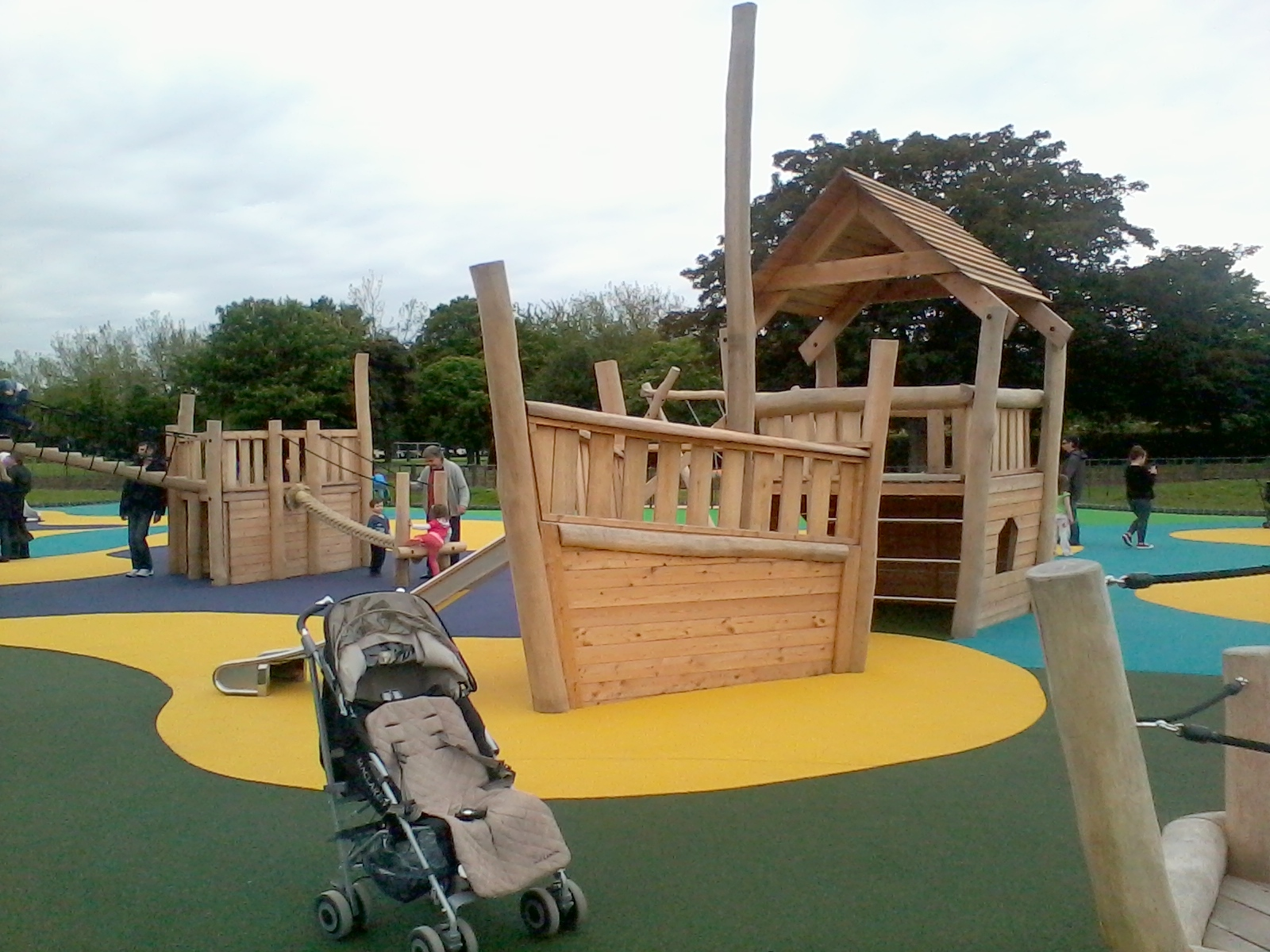
Fairview Park playground

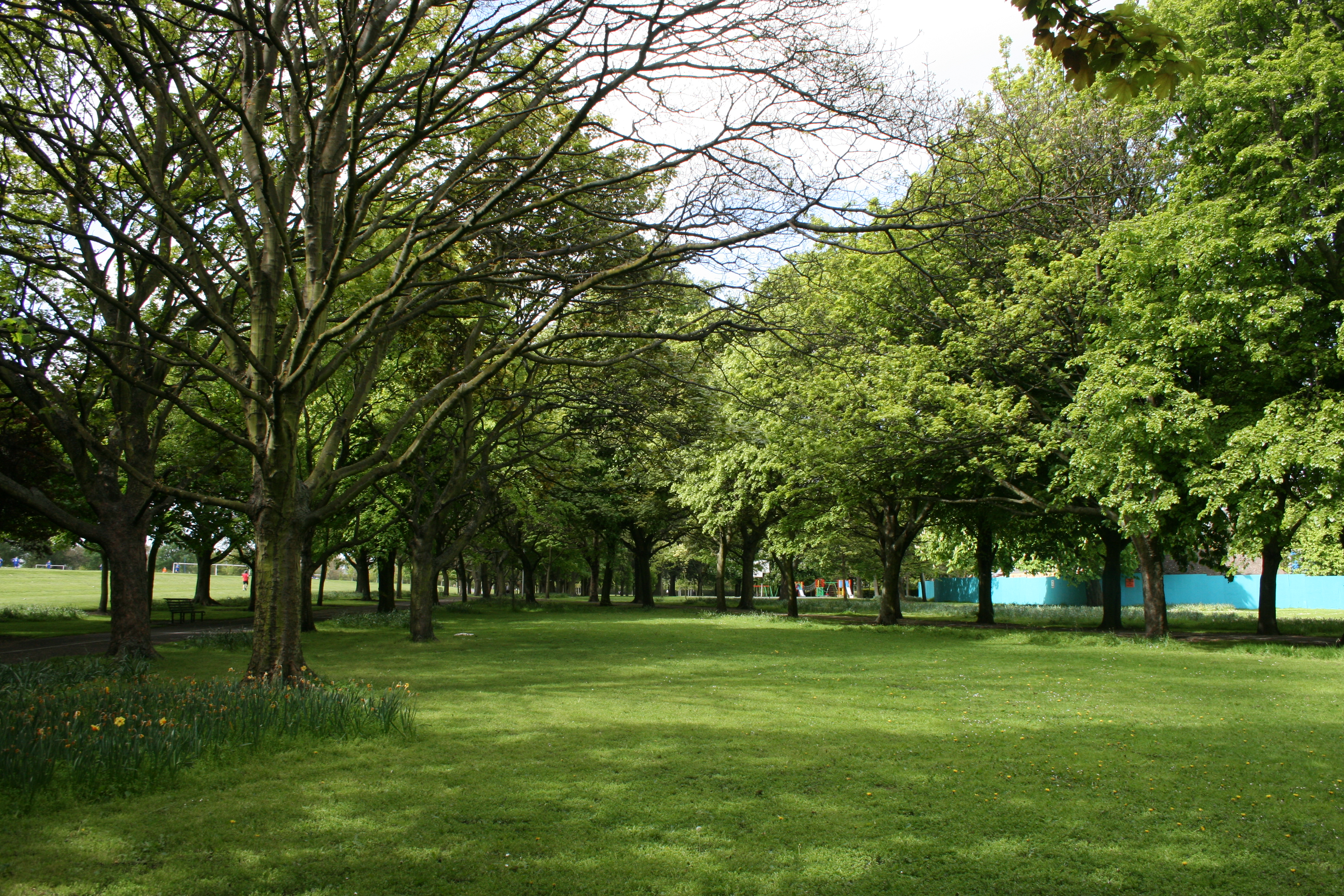
Eastern side of Fairview Park

== Notable people ==
- Cathal Brugha, revolutionary and politician, born at 13 Richmond Avenue.
- Brendan Cauldwell, actor.
- Éamonn Ceannt, one of the seven signatories of the Proclamation of the Irish Republic, lived at 23 Fairview Avenue.
- Kathleen and Tom Clarke, lived at 31 Richmond Avenue.
- Sean Connolly, captain in the Irish Citizen Army and Abbey Theatre actor, lived at 108 Philipsburgh Avenue.
- Ned Daly, Irish revolutionary.
- Larry Gogan, broadcaster.
- Cathal Goulding, Irish republican, lived at 15 Cadogan Road.
- Rosie Hackett, actively involved in the trade union movement, 1913 Lockout and 1916 Rising, lived in Fairview.
- Frank Henderson, captain in the Irish Volunteers.
- James Joyce, lived at several addresses in Fairview between 1896 and 1901.
- George Henry Kinahan, geologist, lived at Woodlands, Philipsburgh Avenue.
- Charles Lever, writer, lived on Philipsburgh Avenue.
- Henry Loftus, 1st Earl of Ely
- Charles Lucas, the patriot physician, lived at Pennyville.
- Thomas McDonagh, one of the seven signatories of the Proclamation of the Irish Republic, lived at Woodlands, 112 Philipsburgh Avenue.
- Seán McGarry, revolutionary and politician, lived at 37 Philipsburgh Avenue.
- Liam Mellows and Barney Mellows, Irish revolutionaries whose childhood home was 10 Annadale Avenue.
- Seán Óg Ó Ceallacháin, broadcaster, Gaelic footballer and hurler.
- Fred O'Donovan, theatre and radio producer.
- Maureen Potter, actress, singer and performer, grew up on St. Joseph's Terrace, off Philipsburgh Avenue.
- Jack Shouldice, revolutionary, lived on Inverness Road.
- Maureen Toal, stage and television actress.
- Rev. David Wilson, Dean of St Patrick's Cathedral, Dublin, lived at Woodlands, 112 Philipsburgh Avenue.
