= Christopher Fleming =

Christopher or Chris Fleming may refer to:

- Christopher Fleming, 8th Baron Slane (died 1517), Irish nobleman
- Christopher Fleming, 17th Baron Slane (1669–1726), member of the Irish parliament
- Christopher Fleming (surgeon) (1800–1880), Irish surgeon
- Chris Fleming (TV personality) (born 1967), American medium and television personality
- Chris Fleming (basketball) (born 1970), American basketball coach
- Chris Fleming (comedian) (born 1987), American comedian and YouTube personality
