= William Thomson (surgeon) =

Irish surgeon

Sir William Thomson CB, F.R.C.S.
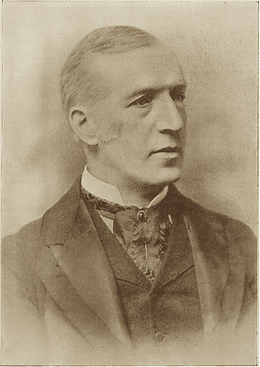
- Born: William David Thomson; 29 June 1843; Downpatrick, Ireland
- Died: 13 November 1909 (aged 66); Dublin, Ireland
- Education: Queen's College, Galway, BA, 1867; Carmichael School of Medicine; Queen's University of Ireland, MD, MCh, 1872
- Occupations: Surgeon; medical writer
- Spouse: Margaret Dalrymple Thomson (m. 1878)
- Children: 2
- Relatives: Charlotte Stoker (mother-in-law); Thornley Stoker (brother-in-law); Bram Stoker (brother-in-law)

Sir William David Thomson CB, F.R.C.S. (29 June 1843 – 13 November 1909) was an Irish surgeon and medical writer.

== Early life and education ==
William David Thomson was born on 29 June 1843 in Downpatrick, Ireland to William Thomson and Margaret Thomson (née Patterson). Thomson's father was from Lanark whilst his mother was from Lanarkshire. Thomson's father died during childhood, and his mother later remarried either John McDougall or Alexander McDougall, the founders of the Galway Express newspaper.

Thomson was privately educated, and worked at the Galway Express editorial office as a teenager. In 1864, Thomson enrolled at Queen's College, Galway (present-day University College Galway) whilst counting to work at the Galway Express. Graduating in 1867, Thomson moved to Dublin and studied at Carmichael School of Medicine whilst working at the Daily Express.

In 1872, Thomson graduated from Queen's University of Ireland with his MD and MCh.

== Career ==
On obtaining his medical degrees he became house surgeon to the Richmond Hospital, Dublin, and demonstrator of anatomy in the Carmichael School. Next year he was elected visiting surgeon to the Richmond Hospital, a post he held to his death. In 1873 he was also appointed lecturer in anatomy in the Carmichael School. In 1882 he became the first general secretary of the newly formed Royal Academy of Medicine in Ireland, his principal duty being to edit its 'Transactions.' From 1896 to 1906 he was direct representative of the Irish medical profession on the General Medical Council. From 1896 to 1898 he was president of the Royal College of Surgeons in Ireland, and in 1897 was knighted. In December 1899 he was invited by Lord Iveagh to organise a field hospital for service in South Africa. In February 1900 he set out and accompanied Lord Roberts in his march to Pretoria. He proved his powers of rapid organisation by establishing, immediately on entering that capital, a hospital of 600 beds in the Palace of Justice, and it was in great part due to him and his colleagues that Pretoria escaped the outbreak of enteric fever which proved disastrous elsewhere. Lord Roberts mentioned his services in despatches. He returned home in November 1900, and he and his colleagues were entertained at a public banquet at the Royal College of Surgeons, Dublin (24 Nov.).

While in South Africa he was appointed surgeon in ordinary to Queen Victoria in Ireland, and in 1901 he became honorary surgeon to King Edward VII. For his services in the South African war he was mentioned in despatches and received the Queen's medal with three clasps. He was also made C.B. From 1895 to 1902 he was surgeon to the lord-lieutenant, Earl Cadogan. He was from 1906 to his death inspector of anatomy for Ireland. Thomson was a surgeon of considerable ability. In 1882 he ligatured the innominate artery, and published an important paper on the subject. In later years he devoted attention to the surgery of the geni to -urinary organs, and was the first among Dublin surgeons to remove an enlarged prostate. He wrote clearly and well, and edited several books, notably the third edition of Power's 'Surgical Anatomy of the Arteries' (1881), and Christopher Fleming's 'Diseases of the Genito-Urinary Organs’ (1877), as well as the 'Transactions of the Royal Academy of Medicine in Ireland’ from 1882 to 1896. For several years he acted as Dublin correspondent to the 'British Medical Journal.' In 1901 he delivered the address in surgery at the annual meeting of the British Medical Association held at Cheltenham, choosing as his subject 'Some Surgical Lessons from the South African Campaign' (British Medical Journal, 1901, vol. ii.). His most notable publication was an exhaustive and judicial report on the poor law medical service of Ireland, undertaken in 1891 at the request of Ernest Hart, editor of the 'British Medical Journal.' The report must form the basis of any inquiry into, or reform of, the poor law medical service. As an organiser, Thomson was at his best. He had a large share in the reorganisation of the school of the Royal College of Surgeons of Ireland during 1880–90, and in the organisation of the Royal Academy of Medicine in Ireland, formed in 1882 by the amalgamation of several old societies, whose interests and aims were not always concordant.

== Personal life ==
On 27 June 1878, Thomson married Dame Margaret Dalrymple Thomson (née Stoker; died 1928) with whom he had two children. Thomson was the son-in-law of Charlotte Stoker (née Thornley; 1818–1901), a charity worker and social reformer, and brother-in-law of the surgeon Thornley Stoker and novelist Bram Stoker.

On 13 November 1909, Thomson died at his residence, 54 St. Stephen's Green, Dublin, . He was buried at Mount Jerome cemetery, Dublin. A mural tablet was erected in the Richmond Hospital, to commemorate his thirty-six years' services as surgeon, and his share in the rebuilding of the hospital in 1899.
