= Thornley Stoker =

Irish surgeon

Sir Thornley Stoker Bt.
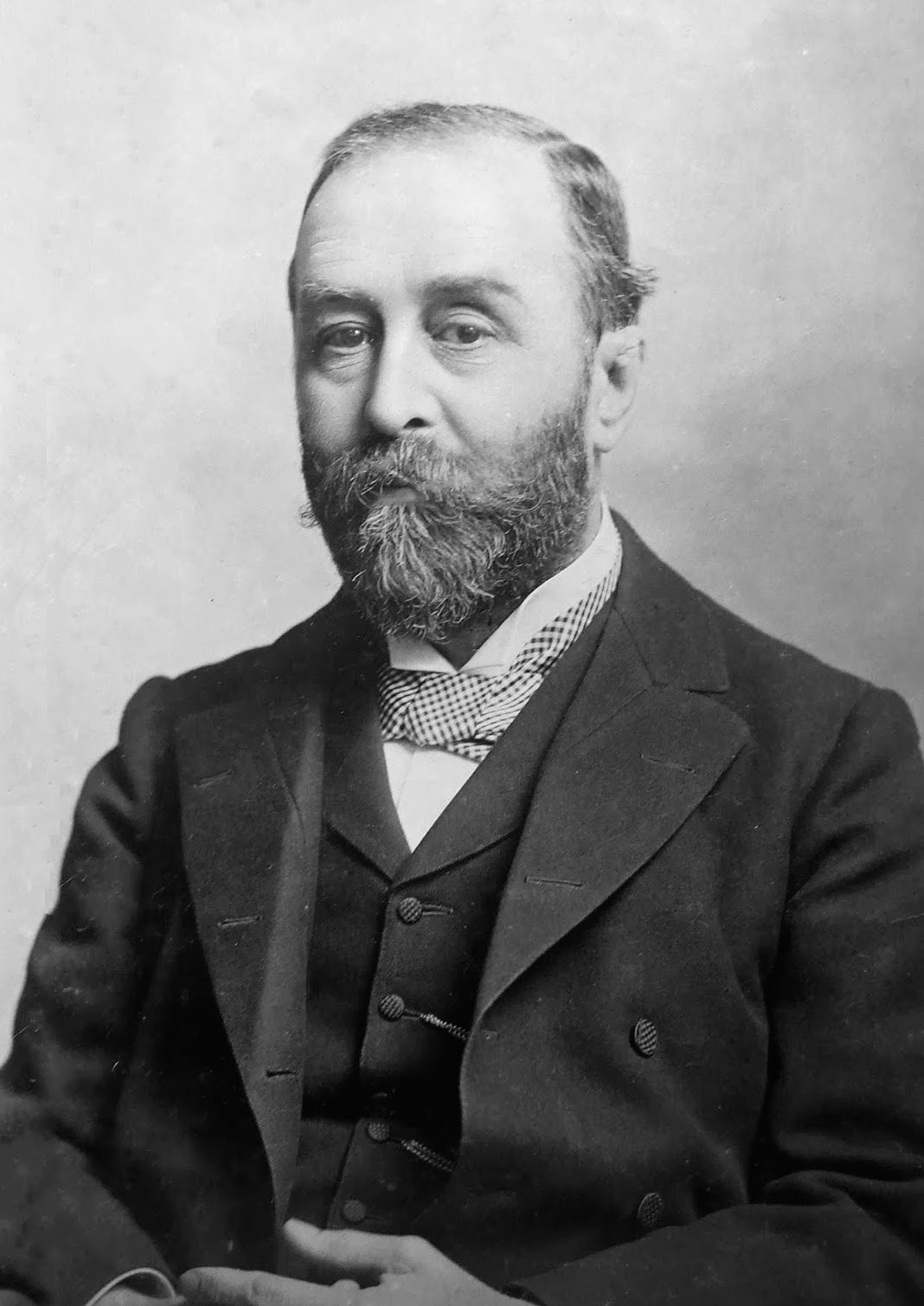
- Born: William Thornley Stoker; 6 March 1845; Marino Crescent. Clontarf, Dublin, Ireland
- Died: 1 July 1912 (aged 67); Dublin, Ireland
- Education: Royal College of Surgeons; Queen's University of Ireland
- Occupations: Medical writer; anatomist; surgeon
- Spouse: Emily Eunice Stoker (m. 1875; died 1910)
- Mother: Charlotte Stoker
- Relatives: Bram Stoker (brother); Florence Stoker (sister-in-law); William Thomson (brother-in-law)

Sir William Thornley Stoker, 1st Baronet (6 March 1845 – 1 July 1912), known as Thornley Stoker, was an Irish medical writer, anatomist and surgeon. He served as chair of anatomy and president of the Royal College of Surgeons in Ireland, president of the Royal Academy of Medicine in Ireland, and professor of anatomy at the Royal Hibernian Academy. He was the brother of the novelist Bram Stoker.

== Early life and education ==
William Thornley Stoker was born on 6 March 1845 at Marino Crescent in Dublin, Ireland to Abraham Stoker (1799–1876), a senior civil servant, and Charlotte Stoker (née Thornley; 1818–1901), a charity worker and social reformer. Stoker was the eldest of 7 siblings, and was the brother of the writer Bram Stoker.

Stroker was educated in Norfolk at Wymondham Grammar School, before returning to Ireland to study medicine at the Royal College of Surgeons and Queen's University of Ireland (present-day University College Galway). In 1866, Stoker obtained his medical degree from Queen's University of Ireland.

== Medical career ==
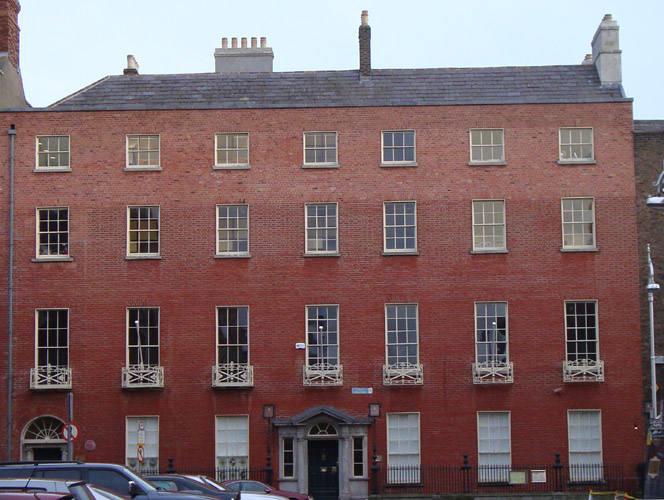
Ely House on Ely Place

He began his career by teaching medicine. After a few years he was appointed surgeon to the Royal City of Dublin Hospital. In 1873 he moved on to the Richmond Hospital.

For several years from 1876 he held the chair of anatomy at the Royal College of Surgeons in Ireland, until his other interests became too pressing. From 1876 he was surgeon to Swift's Hospital (founded by Jonathan Swift), and a Governor of both it and the Richmond Hospital. Together with his brother-in-law and hospital colleague Richard Thomson he founded the school of nursing at the Richmond and oversaw the construction of the surgical facilities there in 1899. He succeeded Richard Thomson as Inspector of Vivisection for Ireland.

All the time he was active in hospitals he was a frequent contributor to the Dublin Journal of Medical Science and similar journals on a variety of medical topics, but took a special interest in surgery of the spino-cerebral cavity. He campaigned against the workhouse system and cruelty to animals.

In 1896 he became president of the Royal College of Surgeons in Ireland and was from 1903 to 1906 president of the Royal Academy of Medicine. He was very interested in art. He was professor of anatomy at the Royal Hibernian Academy and a governor of the National Gallery of Ireland. He resigned from many of his medical duties in 1910, due to fatigue.

On 21 June 1911, Stoker was created a baronet, of Hatch Street in the City of Dublin. He died in June 1912, aged 67, when the baronetcy became extinct.

During the later part of his life he lived at Ely House in Ely Place, Dublin, where he entertained many visitors, artists and writers.

== Personal life ==
On 3 August 1875, Stoker married Emily Eunice Stoker (née Cowderoy; 1841–1910) at St Barnabas Church (present-day St Clement's Church, King Square}, Islington. Emily Stoker lived with some form of mental illness, and was cared for by Stoker's secretary. The writer Florence Dugdale was a companion of Emily Stoker and provided periodic respite care at the Stoker's Dublin home during 1906–1908. Towards the end of her life, Emily entered a nursing-home.

Stoker was the brother-in-law of Sir William Thomson through his sister Margaret Dalrymple Thomson (née Stoker).

Baronetage of the United Kingdom
New creation	Baronet (of Hatch Street); 1911–1912	Extinct
Preceded by Perrott baronets	Stoker baronets of Plumstead; 21 June 1911	Succeeded by Anderson baronets
