= Fred O'Donovan =

Fred O'Donovan may refer to:

- Fred O'Donovan (theatre producer) (1930–2010), Irish theatre producer and businessman
- Fred O'Donovan (actor) (1884–1952), Irish actor, film maker and theatre manager
