= Charlotte Stoker =

Irish writer, activist and the mother of Bram Stoker

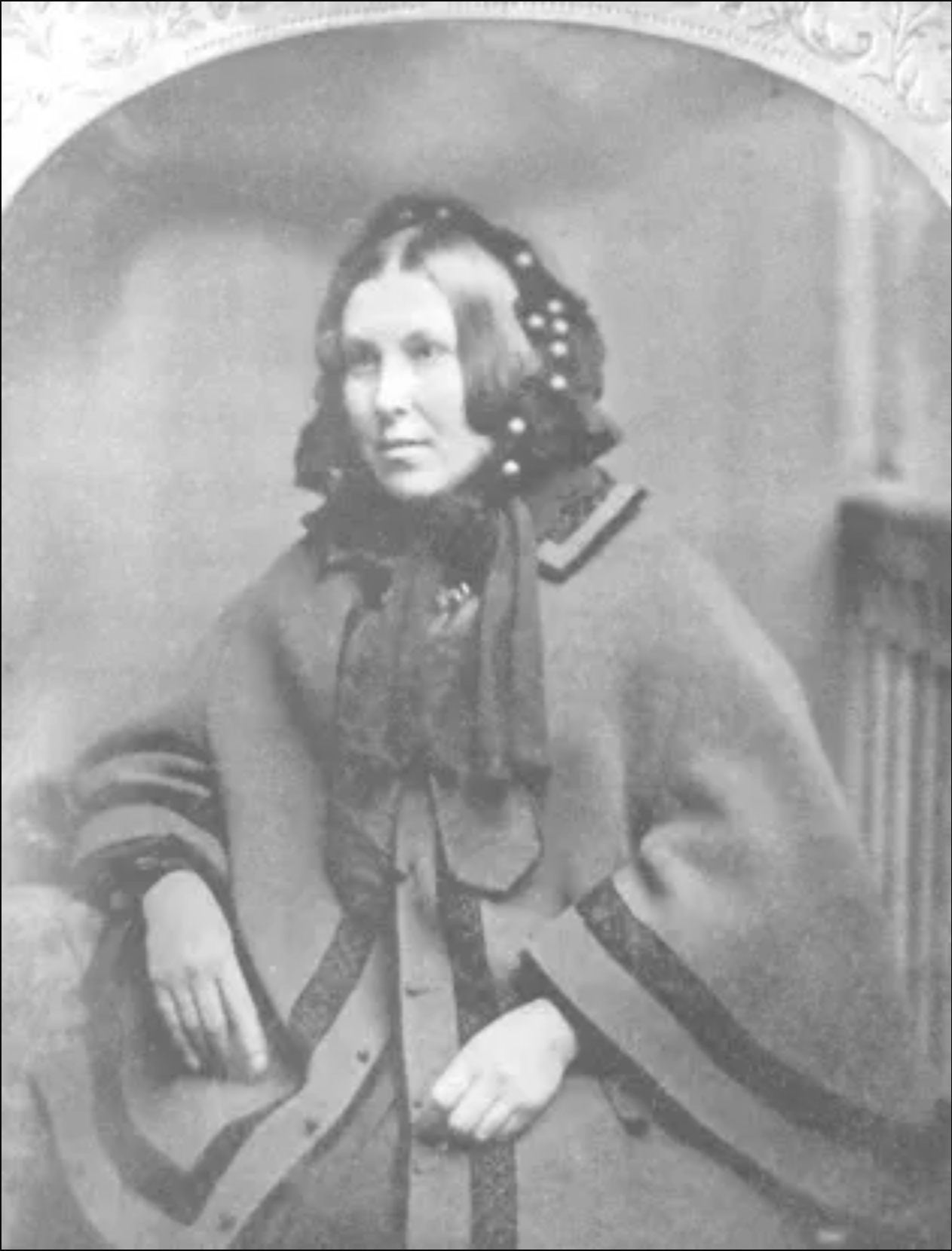
- Born: Charlotte Matilda Blake Thornley; 1818; Sligo, Ireland
- Died: 15 March 1901 (aged 82–83); Rathmines, Dublin, Ireland
- Burial place: St. Michan's Church, Dublin, Ireland
- Spouse: Abraham Stoker Sr. (m. 1844)
- Children: 7 including, Thornley Stoker; Bram Stoker
- Relatives: Florence Stoker (daughter-in-law); William Thomson (son-in-law)

Charlotte Matilda Blake Thornley Stoker (née Thornley; 1818 – 15 March 1901) was an Irish charity worker, social reformer and writer, best known for being the mother of author Bram Stoker.

== Early life ==
Charlotte Matilda Blake Thornley was born in 1818 in Sligo, Ireland, to Captain Thomas Thornley, a former soldier and member of the Royal Irish Constabulary, and Matilda Thornley (née Blake). Stoker's father was Anglo-Irish and her mother was Irish. Stoker was the eldest of three siblings.

=== 1832 Sligo cholera outbreak ===
Stoker lived in Sligo during the 1832 Sligo cholera outbreak. Two weeks into the epidemic, they fled to stay with relatives in Ballyshannon, returning when the epidemic resolved. When her family escaped, it impacted the rest of her life. In 1873, she recorded her experiences in Experiences of the Cholera in Ireland. Bram Stoker incorporated some of her stories about the epidemic into his literature, such as "The Invisible Giant" in Under the Sunset. Marion McGarry posites that her description of the epidemic also inspired Dracula.

== Career ==
When her youngest child, George, turned eight, Stoker began her activist work for women, the poor, and the disabled. She belonged to the Statistical and Social Inquiry Society of Ireland. Seeing the harsh workhouse conditions and speaking with women who wanted to be more than servants in poor households, she reported her findings to Dublin newspapers. She recommended that women in workhouses be taught cooking and framework so they could emigrate to English colonies, to "new countries [where] there is a dignity in labour, and a self-supporting woman is alike respected and respectable."

In May 1863, Stoker supported the establishment of state schools for deaf-mute children. Her speech supporting the school was heard by William Wilde.

== Personal life ==
In 1844, Thornely married Abraham Stoker (1799–1876), a senior civil servant. Together they had 7 children:

- Sir William Thornley Stoker, 1st Baronet (1845–1912) medical writer, anatomist and surgeon; married Emily Eunice Stoker (née Cowderoy; 1841–1910)
- Matilda Stoker Petitjean (née Stoker; c. 1846–c. 1920); married Charles Auguste Petitjean
- Abraham 'Bram' Stoker (1847–1912) writer, barrister and theatre manager; married Florence Stoker (née Balcombe; 1858–1937)
- Thomas Stoker (1849–1925) civil servant in the Indian Civil Service; married Enid Stoker (née Bruce)
- Richard Nugent Stoker (1851–1931) military surgeon; married Susan Harden
- Dame Margaret Dalrymple Thomson (née Stoker; died 1928); married Sir William David Thomson, CB, F.R.C.S (1843–1909) surgeon and medical writer
- George Stoker (1854–1920) military surgeon; married Agnes McGillycuddy Stoker

The Stoker family lived in Dublin, later moving to Clontarf. Charlotte, though untutored, provided their early education. Charlotte and Abraham had taken on considerable debt due to educating their sons. To survive on Abraham's pension more comfortably, they moved, with their two daughters, to France in 1872. They later moved to Italy, where Abraham died.

In 1885, Stoker returned to Dublin, where many of her children lived. At the end of her life, as Charlotte's eyesight failed, she feared going blind and hoped to die first.

Stoker died on 15 March 1901, in Rathmines, Dublin, Ireland, from influenza. She was buried at Mount Jerome Cemetery.

== Publications ==
- Stoker, Charlotte M. B. (1863), On the Necessity of a State Provision for the Education of the Deaf and Dumb of Ireland, Dublin: Alexander Thom
- Stoker, Charlotte M. B. (1864). On Female Emigration from Workhouses. Dublin: Alexander Thom.
- Stoker, Charlotte M. B. (1873). Experiences of the Cholera in Ireland 1832. Swan River Press. pp. 11–18. JSTOR 48536136.
