= Frank Henderson (Irish revolutionary) =

- Born: 1886; Fairview, Dublin, Ireland
- Died: 1959 (aged 72–73)
- Allegiance: Irish Volunteers
- Rank: Commandant
- Conflicts: Easter Rising; Irish War of Independence; Irish Civil War

Frank Henderson (Irish: Proinsíos Mac Ionnraic) was an Irish revolutionary who held the rank of captain of F Company of the Dublin Brigade of the Irish Volunteers. He took part in the Easter Rising, the War of Independence and the Civil War.

== Life ==
Henderson was raised in Fairview in Dublin's Northside. He was educated by the Christian Brothers in St. Joseph's Secondary C.B.S., Fairview, then known as Christian Brothers' Schools, Marino, where he developed a love for the Irish language.

Henderson joined the Irish Volunteers at their foundation in November 1913. He was present at the 1914 gun-running at Howth and he lived beside the Father Matthew Park in Fairview where many of the smuggled guns were stored and the Irish Volunteers drilled.

Henderson was in the GPO alongside Pearse, Connolly and Clarke during the 1916 Rising. He was interned in Stafford jail and then Frongoch in Wales after the Rising.

In 1927 Frank Henderson and Oscar Traynor set up the Fódhla printing company.

In 1941 he became a commandant of the 26th Battalion Old IRA during the Second World War.

== Commemoration ==
In 2011, three plaques were unveiled on sites of historical significance – one in St. Mary's National School, Fairview (site of the former Father Matthew Park) and two in St Joseph's C.B.S., dedicated to the memory of its Past Pupils who took part in the Easter Rising.

Frank Henderson is mentioned in Gene Kerrigan's book, The Scrap.

== Sources ==
- Michael Hopkinson (ed.), (1998). Frank Henderson's Easter Rising: Recollections of a Dublin volunteer. Cork University Press.
- Statement submitted to the Bureau of Military History, 1948
