= Tom Jordan (actor) =

Irish actor (1937–2019)

- Publicity Photo of Tom Jordan
- Born: 1937; Marino, Dublin, Ireland
- Died: 29 June 2019 (aged 82)
- Occupation: Actor
- Years active: 1968(?)–2019
- Known for: Playing Charlie Kelly for three decades
- Television: Fair City

Tom Jordan (1937 – 29 June 2019) was an Irish actor best known for his part as Charlie Kelly in the Irish soap opera Fair City, a part he had for thirty years between the start of the series in 1989 and his death in 2019. Jordan shared a dressing room with Jim Bartley for most of this time.

Between 1968 and 1972, Jordan was a member of the RTÉ Players. A founder member of Project Arts Centre, Jordan spent twelve years working with World Theatre Productions. He served as artistic director of the Belfast's Lyric Theatre from 1987 until 1988. Colleagues recall him as a campaigner for actor rights.

Born in Marino, Dublin, he took up residence in Beaumont where he lived for fifty years. Married with six children, he moved out of Dublin and lived in Roscommon from 2015.

== See also ==
- List of longest-serving soap opera actors#Ireland
