= George Henry Kinahan =

Irish geologist and archaeologist (1829–1908)

- Born: 19 December 1829
- Died: 5 December 1908 (aged 78); Fairview, Dublin, Ireland
- Education: Trinity College Dublin
- Occupations: Geologist, archaeologist

George Henry Kinahan (19 December 1829 – 5 December 1908), M.R.I.A., was an Irish geologist and archaeologist. He worked for railway companies, and then the national geological survey.

== Life ==
He was born on 19 December 1829, the son of Daniel Kinahan M.A., Barrister-at-Law and Louisa Anne Miller. He was educated at Trinity College, Dublin, gaining a Diploma in Engineering. His professional appointments began with railway companies, then joining the Irish Branch of the Geological Survey of the United Kingdom, under Sir Roderick Impey Murchison. He was promoted to Senior Geologist in 1861, District Surveyor in 1869, and retired after thirty-six years service in 1890. Papers by Kinahan were frequently published in Journal of the Geological Society of Dublin and the Irish Naturalist, and he served on the council of the Royal Irish Academy.

Aside from many scientific and archaeological articles, his major works were Manual of the Geology of Ireland (1878); Valleys, and their relation to Fissures, Fractures, and Faults (1875); Handy Book of Rock Names (1873); A Handy Book on the Reclamation of Waste Lands in Ireland; and Superficial and Agricultural Geology, Ireland (1908).

He married Harriette Anne Gerrard (1828-1892) and they had eight children. He died at Woodlands, Fairview, Dublin, on 5 December 1908. They are buried in Castlemacadam Churchyard, Avoca, Co. Wicklow.
