= Ruth Medjber =

Irish photographer

Ruth Medjber is an Irish photographer. She specialises in music photography, and published a book titled Twilight Together in 2020.

== Life and career ==
Medjber grew up in Marino, Dublin. Her father is Algerian Arab. She became interested in photography from a young age due to her father, who sold camera equipment. As a young child she would often receive cheap cameras as presents, and by the time she was a teenager she began combining her loves of music and photography. Medjber would often attend gigs at the Temple Bar Music Centre in Dublin where she photographed the bands backstage. She undertook a university degree in photography, during which time she began having her images published in publications including Hot Press, NME, and Rolling Stone. Medjber says that she was a "terrible student" and her time at university reduced her confidence as a photographer.

Focusing on music photography, Medjber has worked as the photographer of band tours for acts including Arcade Fire and Hozier. She also photographs music festivals, such as Glastonbury Festival 2019 which she photographed for the BBC, and takes portrait photographs.

As a child, Medjber says she was "painfully shy", and found empowerment through taking photographs. While her mother and father are Catholic and Muslim respectively, Medjber describes herself as an atheist.

=== Twilight Together ===
During the COVID-19 pandemic in the Republic of Ireland, Medjber found herself without photography work as the music industry paused all live events, with a year's worth of plans suddenly cancelled. In March 2020, during the first lockdown in Ireland, Medjber began taking pictures of friends and family through their front room windows, trialling an idea she had had to photograph people in this way at Christmas. The first photos, published under the project title of Grá Sa Bhaile, received positive coverage in the media and amongst other families in Ireland – 400 families in her area emailed to request photos of themselves. As a result of the publicity, Medjber had soon made a book deal to embark on a larger scale project. She made plans for the photos to be taken during twilight, and wanted the book to be as diverse as possible. In total, Medjber published 150 portraits in a book titled Twilight Together. RTÉ described the book as a "stunning and deeply moving book."
