= Marino Crescent =

Georgian crescent in Dublin 3, Ireland

Coordinates: 53°21′52.28″N 6°13′44.69″W

- Marino Terrace, Fairview Crescent, The Crescent
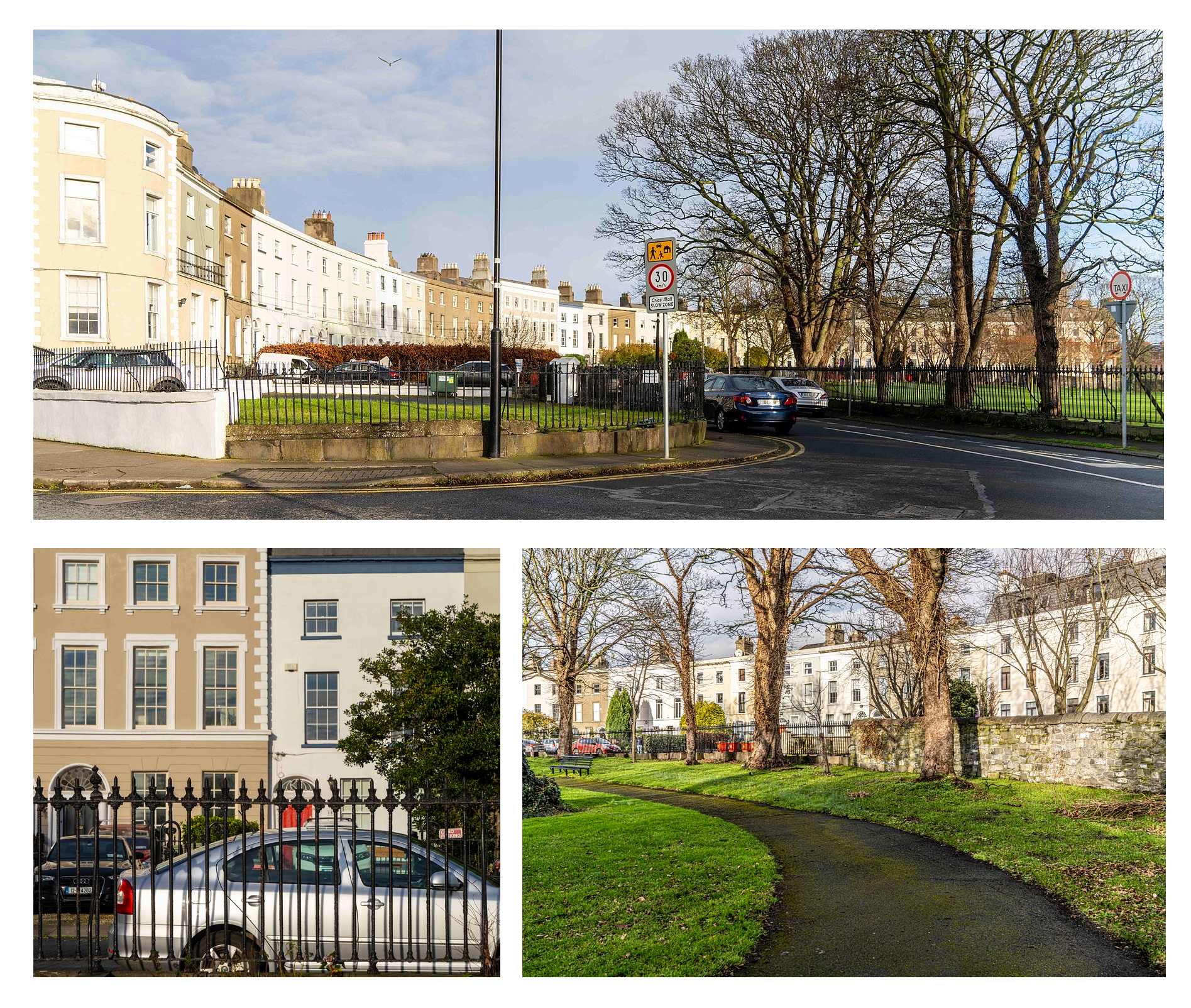
- A view east along Marino Crescent in January 2020

- Location within Dublin
- Native name: An Corrán (Irish)
- Former name: Ffolliott's Crescent
- Namesake: Marino, Dublin
- Length: 240 m (790 ft)
- Location: Dublin, Ireland
- Postal code: D03
- east end: Howth Road
- south end: Clontarf Road

Construction
- Completion: 1792

Other
- Known for: Georgian Dublin, Bram Stoker, Harry Boland

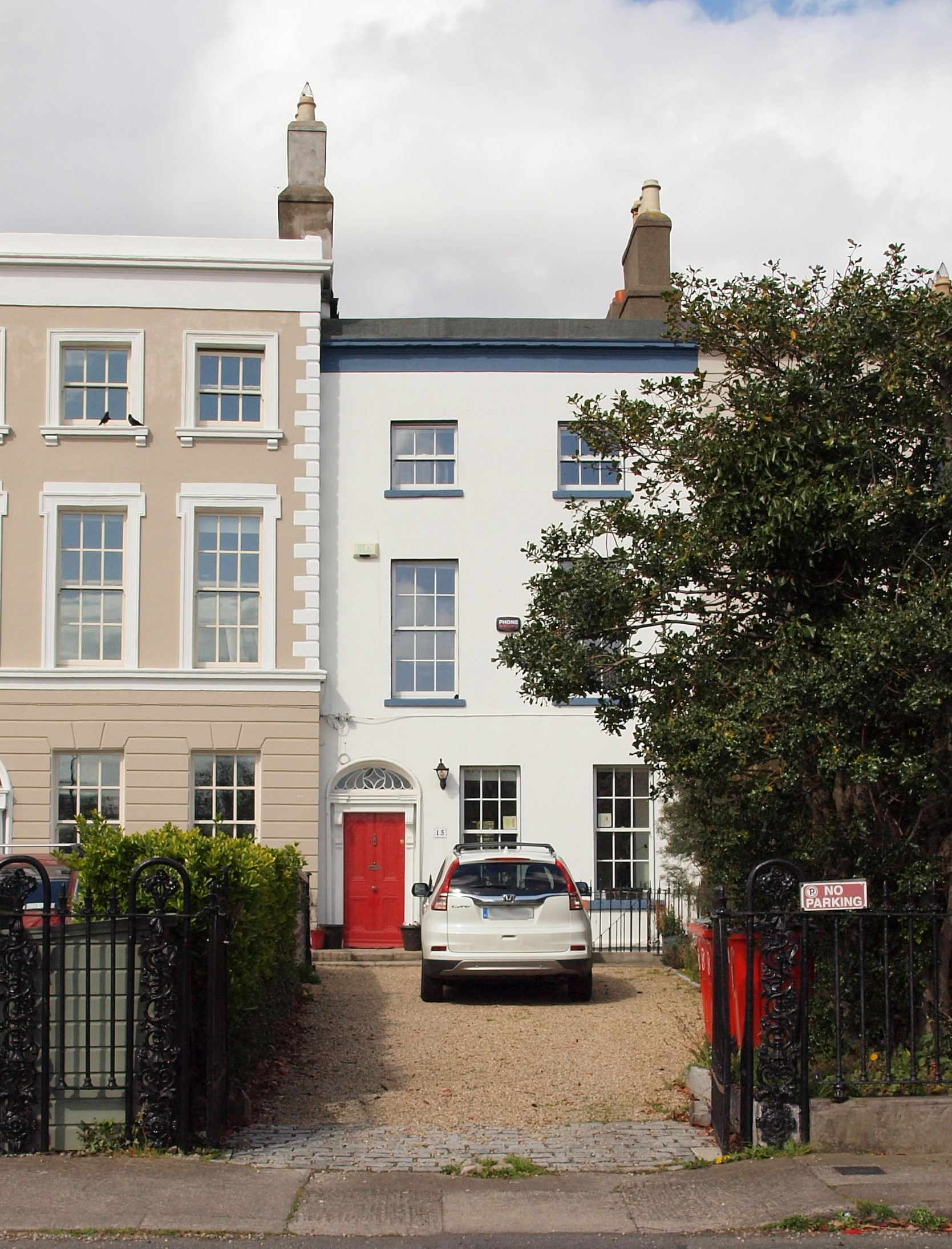
Bram Stoker's former residence at Number 15 The Crescent

Marino Crescent (Irish: An Corrán, meaning 'The Sickle') is a Georgian crescent of 26 houses at the junction of Marino, Fairview and Clontarf in Dublin 3, Ireland. It is the only Georgian crescent in Dublin.

== History ==
The crescent was built by Charles Ffolliott in 1792 as a spite wall to block the view of Dublin Bay from the now demolished Marino House and its better-known folly, the Casino at Marino, which was much coveted by its owner, James Caulfeild, 1st Earl of Charlemont . Charlemont had engaged Ffolliott as a painter for Marino House, and the construction of Marino Crescent in spite was the result of a disagreement between the men.

The terrace was built with red brick front finishes in a similar method to Mountjoy Square and Merrion Square however, owing to later fashions during the 19th century, the fronts were plastered over during the Regency period and all of the facades remain in the same state as of 2020. Ffolliott made the rears as unattractive as possible to further spoil the view from Marino House. During their construction, bones were found and attributed to the Battle of Clontarf. The crescent was initially known as "Spite Crescent".

All of the houses are three-storey over basement properties and all are two-bay with the exception of the two largest central houses, numbers 13 and 14, which are three-bay.

Number 26 was demolished in the 1980s to make way for a faux Georgian block of apartments known as Crescent House. The remaining 25 houses on the terrace are listed on the Record of Protected Structures.

== Notable residents ==
- Florence Balcombe, Bram Stoker's future wife, lived at number 1.
- Harry Boland lived at 5 Marino Crescent and for a short time at number 15. While living there he used the chimney to store a small portion of the Russian Crown Jewels. The jewels were given as security for a loan of $20,000 given by an Irish government delegation (part of the first Dáil Éireann) to Ludwig Martens, the new Soviet government representative in New York. Number 15 was also used to store guns as part of the Howth gun-running.
- William Carleton, the Poor Scholar, lived at number 3.
- Charles Ffolliott lived at number 10.
- Martin Haverty, a historian, lived at number 21.
- Bram Stoker lived at number 15 for a period during his childhood, as did his brother, Thornley Stoker.
- Sir Simon Bradstreet, 4th Baronet - one of the Bradstreet baronets is recorded as being at 1 Marino Crescent in 1852

== Bram Stoker Park ==
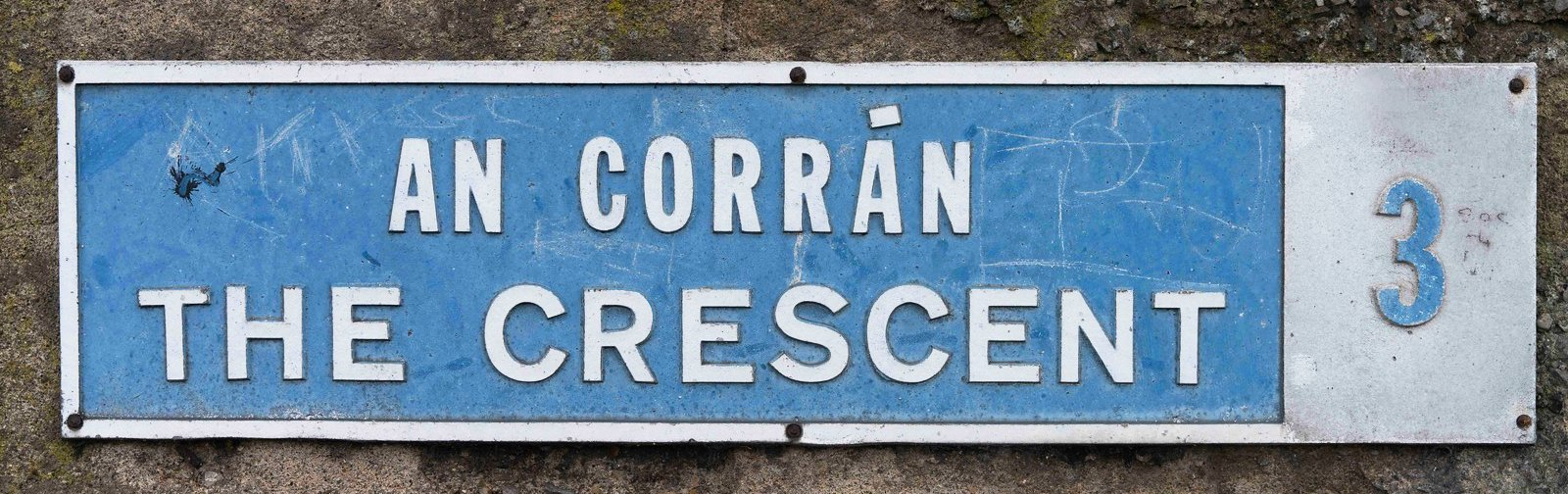
Street sign indicating the crescent is located in Dublin's D3 district

The originally private Marino Crescent Park garden square in front of the crescent is now a public park having been acquired by Dublin Corporation in the 1980s. It was officially renamed Bram Stoker Park by Dublin City Council in the 2010s but retains its private feel due to a wall and trees surrounding most of the park with the original Georgian fencing surrounding the remainder facing the houses.

The park is 2.5 acres. Closing times range from an earliest of 16.30 in December and January to a latest of 21.30 in June and July.

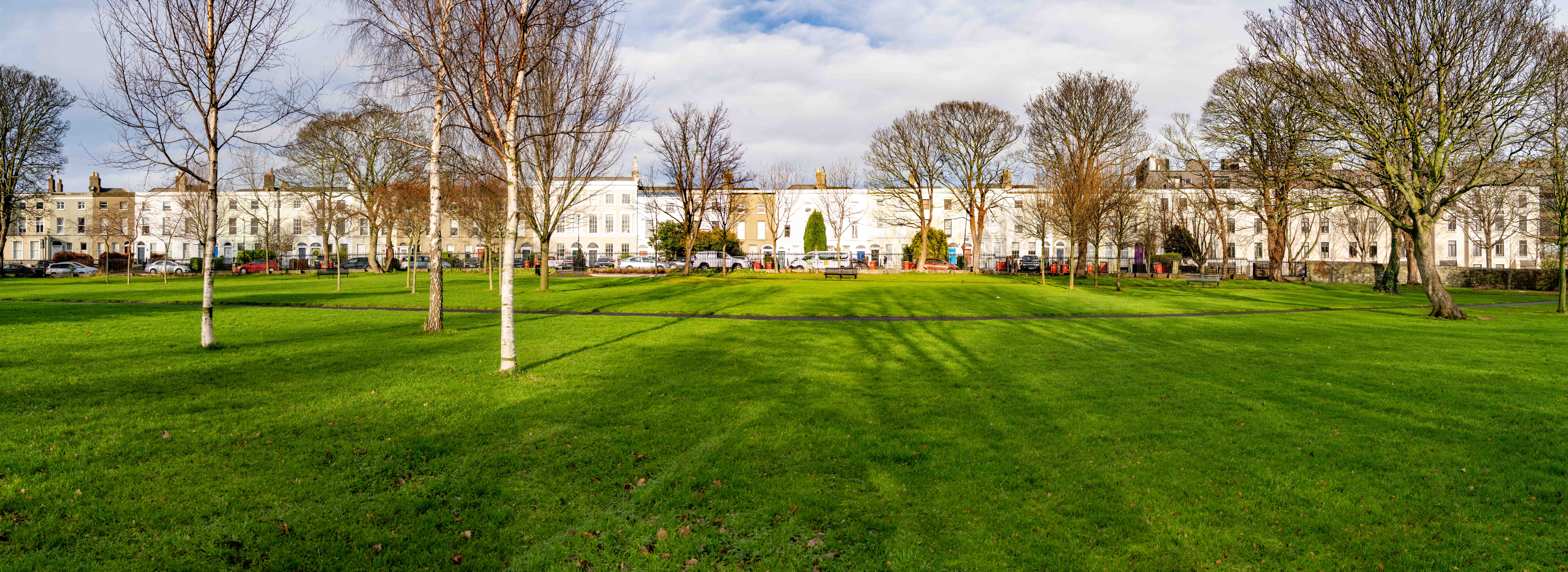
Marino Crescent as seen from Bram Stoker Park

== See also ==
- Royal Crescent, Bath, England
- The Crescent, Limerick
