= Joseph Patrick Haverty =

Irish painter (1794–1864)

- Born: 1794; Galway, Ireland
- Died: 27 July 1864 (aged 69–70); Rathmines, Dublin
- Children: Thomas Haverty

Joseph Patrick Haverty RHA (1794 – 27 July 1864) was an Irish painter. He painted genre scenes, landscapes, and portraits, including that of Daniel O’Connell.

== Life ==
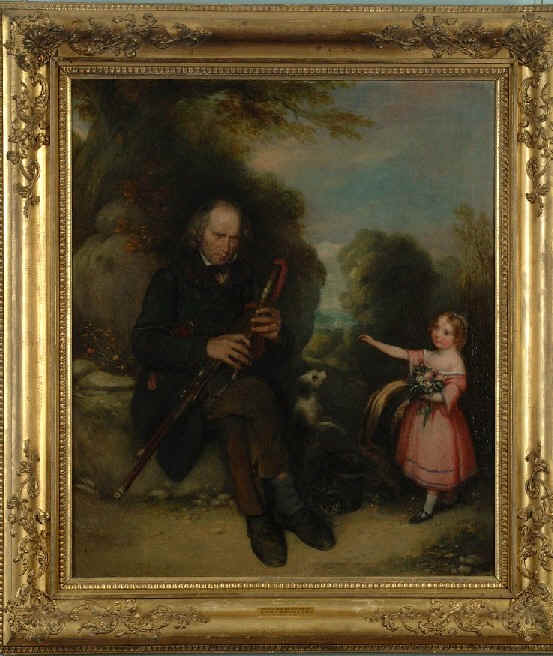
Patrick O'Brien: The Limerick Piper, Joseph Patrick Haverty; 1844, oil on canvas, 88 x 74.9 cm

Haverty was born in Galway, with nothing known about his early life or training. His brother (or sometimes recorded as half brother) was the author, Martin Haverty. The first record of him is in 1814 when he sent a painting to the Hibernian Society of Artists from Galway. By 1815, he was living in Dublin, from where he established himself as a portrait painter.

He was elected an associate member of the Royal Hibernian Academy (RHA) when it was founded in 1823, becoming a full member in 1829, and resigning from the academy in 1837. Despite this, he was a regular exhibitor with the RHA until 1861. Haverty lived at Rostrevor, County Down, Limerick, and London. During his time in London, he exhibited 27 portraits with the Royal Academy between 1835 and 1858, as well as exhibiting with the Society of British Artists.

His early work is in a romantic style with clear influences from David Wilkie. Over time, Haverty moved to more realism, with nationalist overtones. He was also commissioned to undertake a number of religious paintings, as well as altarpieces. No surviving altarpieces are known but Alfred Webb records in 1878 that several "are to be found in the Catholic churches of Dublin." He also made lithographs of his works.

Considered to be one of the most prolific portrait painters of his time, it was reported in 1842 that "if our face was worth painting, Mr Haverty should paint it!"

His 1844 piece, The Limerick Piper, became one of the most famous 19th century lithographs. The work features Patrick O'Brien, a blind Gaelic piper from Labasheeda, popularised by Haverty's painting.

Haverty died of edema on 27 July 1864 at this home, 44 Rathmines Road, Dublin, following a long illness, and was buried at Glasnevin Cemetery. He married Maria (died 26 December 1852) in 1816 and had a large family, all born in Galway. Thomas Haverty (born circa 1825), was his second son, and was a portrait painter in the 1840s and 1850s.

In November 2003, one of Haverty's paintings sold for a record €227,000 at one of Christie's auctions of Irish art.

== Works ==
- Father Mathew receiving a repentant pledge-breaker held in the National Gallery of Ireland
- O'Connell and his contemporaries; the Clare election, 1828 held in the NGI
- Cupid and Psyche (1815)
- The baptism of Ethelbert (1846)
