= Fred O'Donovan (theatre producer) =

- Born: 1930; Fairview, Dublin, Ireland
- Died: 14 May 2010 (age 80)
- Spouse: Sally

Fred O'Donovan (1930 – 14 May 2010) was an Irish theatre producer and businessman.

O'Donovan served as Chairman of the RTÉ Authority between 1981 and 1985. He was a co-founder of the Irish Cancer Society with Austin Darragh, an achievement he expressed his fondness for before he died.

== Career ==
O'Donovan was born in Fairview, Dublin. In 1948 he was working for the Royal Air Force when he caught tuberculosis and was told by Swiss medical professionals that he would be dead within the year. He survived. Whilst working with the RAF he developed his first taste for showbiz after producing a Paul Robeson show at Long Kesh, intended to entertain the military personnel. "It made me realise what a wonderful business it was", he later recalled.

Back in Ireland, he took up jobs in radio and theatre, beginning his new career as an assistant stage manager in the theatre, a position he described as "the lowest form of life". Whilst working on a 1955 production of The Bishop's Bonfire he commenced a close personal relationship with Seán O'Casey over the telephone, recalling in later life that "I learned more from O'Casey on the phone than anybody". O'Donovan embarked on a trip to London to meet George Bernard Shaw with the intention of having his royalty fee decreased; he was refused. He produced The Ed Sullivan Show when it visited Ireland, insisting on the use of Irish artists, including Maureen Potter, who received a career boost from the experience.

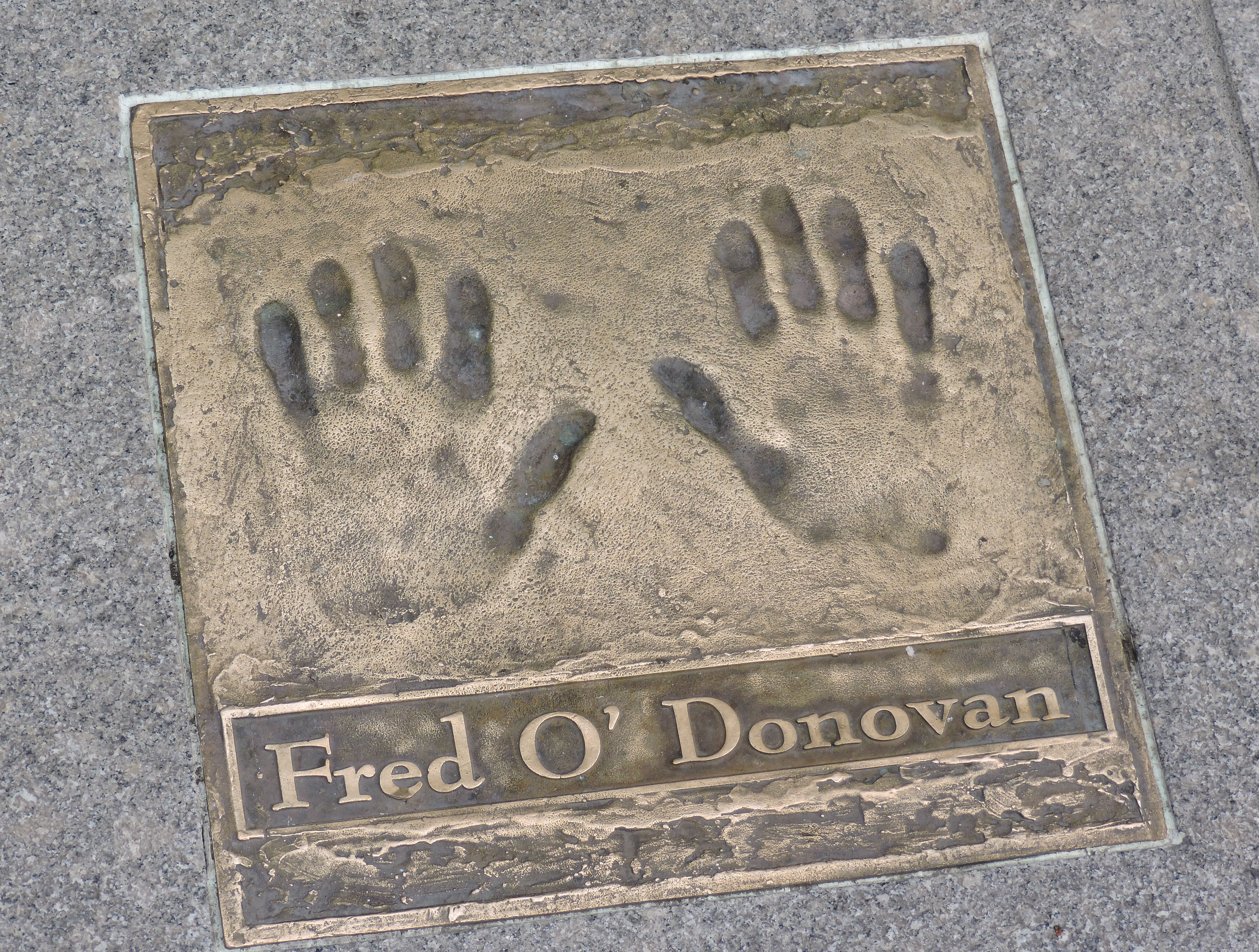
Fred O'Donovan handprints (Gaiety Theatre, Dublin)

O'Donovan joined the Irish Theatre Company in the 1970s and achieved recognition as the producer of variety show Gaels of Laughter, which featured Maureen Potter and was performed at Dublin's Gaiety Theatre. Gaels of Laughter returned to the Gaiety Theatre for a one-night tribute show to O'Donovan on 25 January 2010, with Gay Byrne as host and John McColgan as producer. Other production credits include several Christmas pantomimes, Jury's Irish Cabaret, The Jack Benny Show and Juno and the Paycock, which featured Peter O'Toole, Siobhán McKenna and Jack MacGowran. He was the National Concert Hall's chairman from its opening in 1981 and was a member of the Independent Radio and Television Commission from its beginnings. He was also a business partner of Denis O'Brien for a period of time until the two fell out.

On 23 January 2010, in an interview with Fiona McCann for The Irish Times, he vowed never to write a memoir, though admitted making an attempt only for former taoiseach Charles Haughey to "put me off". He ominously expressed his disbelief that he had made it to his eightieth year — "I can't get used to the fact that I'm alive", he remarked, whilst reflecting on his previous near brush with death.

O'Donovan died at the age of 80. Tributes came from people including Gate Theatre director Michael Colgan, veteran broadcaster Gay Byrne, and Tom Savage, who was RTÉ Authority chairman at the time of his death.
