= Christopher Fleming (surgeon) =

Irish surgeon

- Born: 1800
- Died: 1880 (aged 79–80)
- Occupation: Surgeon

Christopher Fleming MD FRCSI (14 July 1800 – 30 December 1880) was an Irish surgeon.

== Life ==
He was born at Boardstown in County Westmeath on 14 July 1800, and in 1821 graduated B.A. from Trinity College Dublin. He became a licentiate of the Royal College of Surgeons in Ireland (RCSI) in 1824, and a member in 1826. In 1838, he took an M.D. degree from Trinity College Dublin, but did not obtain a hospital appointment until 1851, when he became surgeon to the House of Industry Hospitals.

In 1856, he was elected President of the Royal College of Surgeons in Ireland, and in 1877 collected some papers which he had previously published in medical journals into a volume entitled Clinical Records of Injuries and Diseases of the Genito-Urinary Organs. His only other work is "Remarks on the Application of Chloroform to Surgical purposes", Dublin, 1851, and both are without permanent value.

He married a Miss Radcliff, and had seven children, of whom a son and a daughter survived him. He retired from practice a few years before his death, and went to live at Donnybrook, near Dublin, where he died 30 December 1880.
