= Florence Stoker =

Wife and literary executor of Bram Stoker

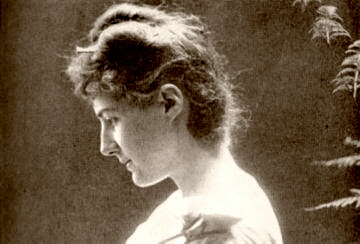
- Stoker in November 1880
- Born: Florence Anne Lemon Balcombe; 17 July 1858; Falmouth, Cornwall, England
- Died: 25 May 1937 (aged 78); Knightsbridge, London, England
- Spouse: Bram Stoker (m. 1878; died 1912)
- Children: 1

Florence Stoker (née Balcombe, 17 July 1858 – 25 May 1937) was the wife and literary executor of Bram Stoker. She is remembered for her legal dispute with the makers of Nosferatu, an unauthorized film based on her husband's novel Dracula.

== Life ==
The daughter of Lieutenant-Colonel James Balcombe of 1 Marino Crescent, Clontarf, and of Phillippa Anne Marshall, she was a celebrated beauty whose former suitor was Oscar Wilde. She married Stoker in Dublin in 1878. He had known Wilde from their student days, and had proposed Wilde for membership of the university's Philosophical Society while he was president. Although Wilde was upset at Florence's decision, Stoker generally kept up the acquaintanceship.

The Stokers moved to London, where he became acting-manager and then business manager of Henry Irving's Lyceum Theatre, London, a post he held for 27 years. Their only child was born on 31 December 1879 and christened Irving Noel Thornley Stoker.

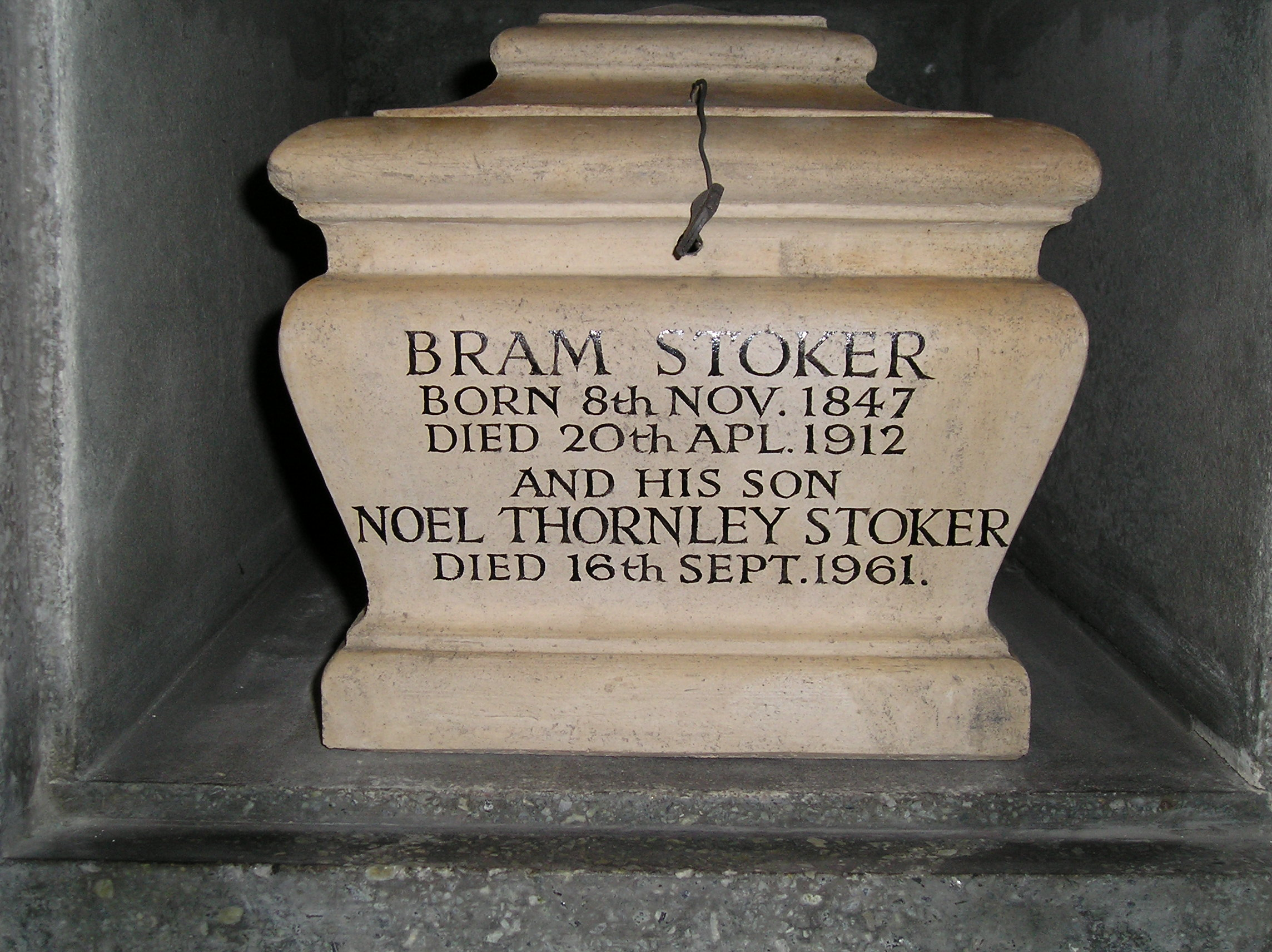
In Golders Green Crematorium

Florence outlived her husband by 25 years and died in 1937 at the age of 78. She was cremated at Golders Green Crematorium, and her ashes scattered at the Gardens of Rest there. The original plan had been to keep her ashes and those of her husband together in a display urn. After Irving Noel Stoker's death in 1961, his ashes were added to those of his father in that urn.

== Nosferatu ==
Stoker is remembered for her legal dispute with the makers of the 1922 German horror film Nosferatu, which was based without attribution or permission on Stoker's novel Dracula. She was unaware of the existence of Friedrich Wilhelm Murnau's Nosferatu until she received an anonymous letter from Berlin. The document included the programme of a lavish cinematic event held in 1922, complete with full orchestral accompaniment, that had taken place in the Marble Garden at Berlin Zoological Garden. The film was described in the handbill as "freely adapted from Bram Stoker's Dracula." (Nosferatu screenwriter Henrik Galeen had changed the names of the main characters and made some liberal changes to certain key points. However, the resemblance to Stoker's novel was undeniable.)

She was struggling financially and, as Bram Stoker's literary executor, had never given permission for the adaptation, nor received payment for it. Her furious response to this copyright infringement was prompt and uncompromising: not only did she want the financial reparation she felt was due to the estate, she demanded that the negative and all prints of the film (which she would never actually see) be immediately destroyed.

Stoker launched a lawsuit in which she was represented by the lawyers of the British Incorporated Society of Authors. The suit took some time to resolve; at one point, the German production company Prana Film declared bankruptcy to avoid paying for the adaptation. Finally, she won the case, with the final ruling in July 1925 stating that the negatives and all prints of the film should be handed over to her to be destroyed.

Despite this ruling, prints of the film slowly began to resurface in the late 1920s, with the first American screenings taking place in New York City and Detroit in 1929.

Stoker did grant the rights to the stage adaptation of Dracula to Hamilton Deane, who had been a neighbour of hers in Dublin. Deane's play, Dracula, premiered in Derby in 1924. In 1927 Horace Liveright bought the American dramatic rights from Florence and hired John L. Balderston to edit it for the New York stage. The show ran for a year on Broadway and for two more years on tour, breaking all previous records for any show put on tour in the United States. However, Liveright failed to pay Florence all her entitlements for the show – he died shortly afterwards.
