= Martin Haverty =

Irish journalist and historian

- Born: 1 December 1809; County Mayo, Ireland
- Died: 18 January 1887 (aged 77); Dublin, Ireland
- Occupations: journalist and historian

Martin Haverty (1 December 1809–18 January 1887) was an Irish journalist and historian.

== Life ==
Born in County Mayo on 1 December 1809. Joseph Patrick Haverty was his older brother or half-brother. Nothing further is known about his early life. Planning on joining the priesthood, Haverty received most of his education at the Irish College, Paris. He then decided to pursue writing, and came to Dublin in 1836. In the following year, he joined the staff of the Freeman's Journal, with which he was connected until 1850 acting as the foreign correspondent. During this time he travelled through Spain, Italy, and Algiers, also writing for the London Morning Chronicle.

On his return to Dublin in 1952, Haverty was made sub-librarian at the King's Inns, where he remained for nearly a quarter of a century until 1877, devoting himself principally to the preparation of a general index to the books in the library. During this time, he also undertook historical research. He published the report on the British Association's 1857 excursion to the Aran Islands, led by William Wilde, in 1859. His History of Ireland, ancient and modern, for the use of schools and colleges appeared was a comprehensive history of island, aided by Wilde, R. R. Madden, John O'Donovan and Eugene O'Curry.

He died at his home, 40 Alphonsus Road, Drumcondra, on 18 January 1887 and is buried in Glasnevin Cemetery.

Haverty was married twice. He had two daughters by his first wife, Gwendoline (died 1873) and Mary. He then married Kate Mary Rogers in 1860. They had two daughters, Selina and Eileen. He also owned part of the Royce estate, County Limerick, where he designed and built Kilbehy House.

== Works ==
- Wanderings in Spain in 1843, London, 2 vols., 1844.
- The History of Ireland, Ancient and Modern. Derived from our native annals … with copious Topographical and general Notes, Dublin, 1860. The materials for this history were largely gathered abroad. A second and enlarged edition appeared in 1885.
- The History of Ireland, Ancient and Modern, for the use of Schools and Colleges, &c., Dublin, 1860.
- The History of Ireland, from the earliest period to the present time: derived from native and from the researches of Dr. O’Donovan, Professor Eugene Curry, The Rev C.P. Meehan, Dr. R. R. Madden, and other Eminent Scholars; and from All the resources of Irish History Now available. 1867, New York, copyright 1881 by Thomas Kelly.
