= Hop-Frog =

Short story by Edgar Allan Poe

- Short story by Edgar Allan Poe
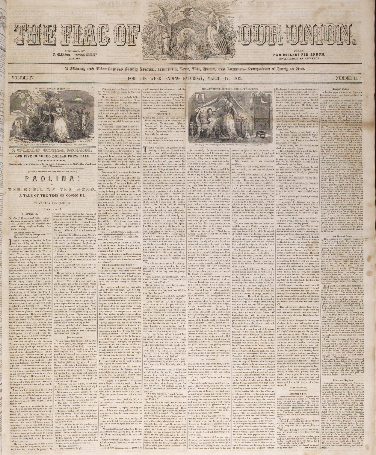
- Original title: Hop-Frog; Or, the Eight Chained Ourang-Outangs
- Country: United States
- Language: English
- Genres: Horror; Short story

Publication
- Published in: The Flag of Our Union
- Publisher: Frederick Gleason
- Media type: Print
- Publication date: March 17, 1849

"Hop-Frog" (originally "Hop-Frog; Or, the Eight Chained Ourang-Outangs") is a short story by American writer Edgar Allan Poe, first published in 1849. The title character, a person with dwarfism taken from his homeland, becomes the jester of a king particularly fond of practical jokes. Taking revenge on the king and his cabinet for the king's striking of his friend and fellow dwarf Trippetta, he dresses the king and his cabinet as orangutans for a masquerade. In front of the king's guests, Hop-Frog murders them all by setting their costumes on fire before escaping with Trippetta.

Critical analysis has suggested that Poe wrote the story as a form of literary revenge against a woman named Elizabeth F. Ellet and her circle.

== Plot summary ==
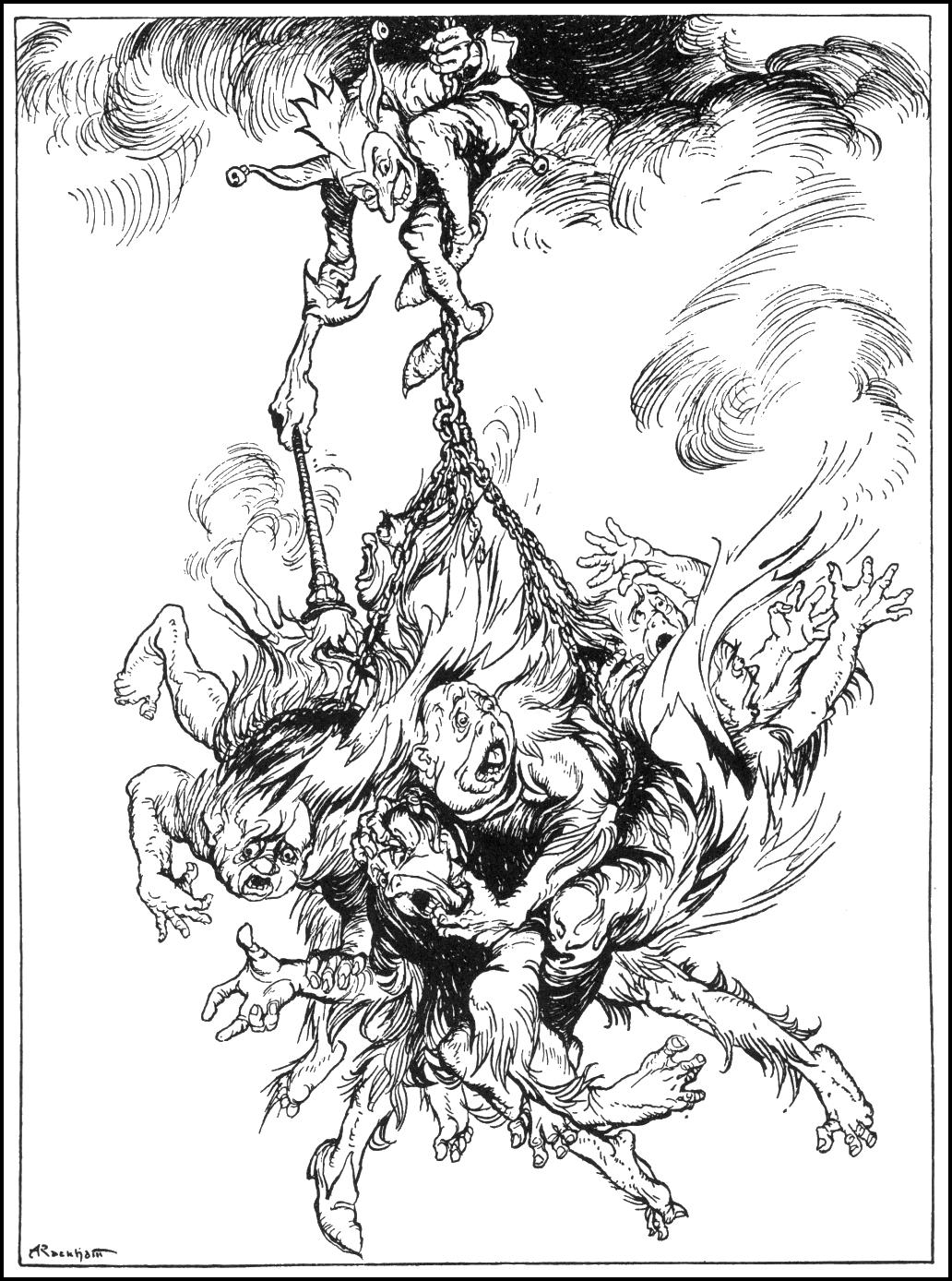
Hop-Frog's revenge

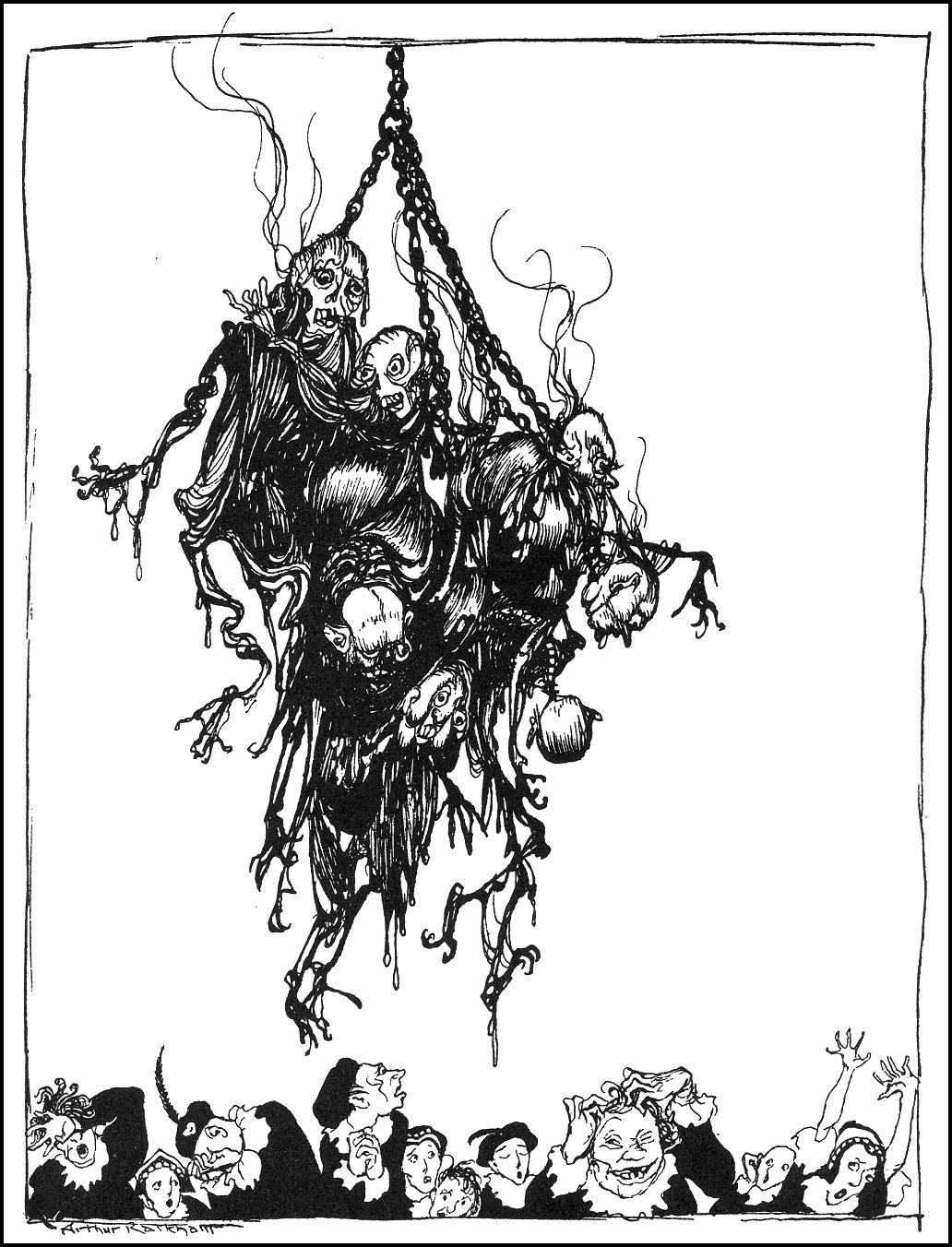
Hop Frog's last joke, 1935 illustration by Arthur Rackham

The court jester Hop-Frog, "being also a dwarf and a cripple", is the much-abused "fool" of the unnamed king. This king has an insatiable sense of humor: "he seemed to live only for joking". Both Hop-Frog and his best friend, the dancer Trippetta (also small, but beautiful and well-proportioned), have been stolen from their homeland and essentially function as slaves. Because of his physical deformity, which prevents him from walking upright, the King nicknames him "Hop-Frog".

Hop-Frog reacts severely to alcohol, and though the king knows this, he forces Hop-Frog to consume several goblets full. Trippetta begs the king to stop. Though Trippetta is said to be a favorite of his, he pushes her and throws a goblet of wine into her face in front of seven members of his cabinet council. The violent act makes Hop-Frog grind his teeth. The powerful men laugh at the expense of the two servants and ask Hop-Frog (who suddenly becomes sober and cheerful) for advice on an upcoming masquerade. He suggests some very realistic costumes for the men: costumes of orangutans chained together. The men love the idea of scaring their guests and agree to wear tight-fitting shirts and pants saturated with tar and covered with flax. In full costume, the men are then chained together and led into the "grand saloon" of masqueraders just after midnight.

As predicted, the guests are shocked and many believe the men to be real "beasts of some kind in reality, if not precisely ourang-outangs". Many rush for the doors to escape, but the King had insisted the doors be locked; the keys are left with Hop-Frog. Amidst the chaos, Hop-Frog attaches a chain from the ceiling to the chain linked around the men in costume. The chain then pulls them up via pulley (presumably by Trippetta, who has arranged the room to help with the scheme) far above the crowd. Hop-Frog puts on a spectacle so that the guests presume "the whole matter as a well-contrived pleasantry". He claims he can identify the culprits by looking at them up close. He climbs up to their level, grits his teeth again, and holds a torch close to the men's faces. They quickly catch fire: "In less than half a minute the whole eight ourang-outangs were blazing fiercely, amid the shrieks of the multitude who gazed at them from below, horror-stricken, and without the power to render them the slightest assistance". Finally, before escaping through a sky-light, Hop-Frog identifies the men in costume:

I now see distinctly... what manner of people these maskers are. They are a great king and his seven privy-councillors—a king who does not scruple to strike a defenceless girl, and his seven councillors who abet him in the outrage. As for myself, I am simply Hop-Frog, the jester—and this is my last jest.

The ending explains that, after that night, neither Hop-Frog nor Tripetta were ever seen again. It is implied that she was his accomplice and that they fled together back to their home country.

== Publication history ==
The tale first appeared in the March 17, 1849 edition of The Flag of Our Union, a Boston-based newspaper published by Frederick Gleason and edited by Maturin Murray Ballou. It originally carried the full title "Hop Frog; Or, The Eight Chained Ourang-Outangs". In a letter to friend Nancy Richmond, Poe wrote: "The 5 prose pages I finished yesterday are called — what do you think? — I am sure you will never guess — Hop-Frog! Only think of your Eddy writing a story with such a name as 'Hop-Frog'!"

He explained that, though The Flag of Our Union was not a respectable journal "in a literary point of view", it paid very well.

== Analysis ==
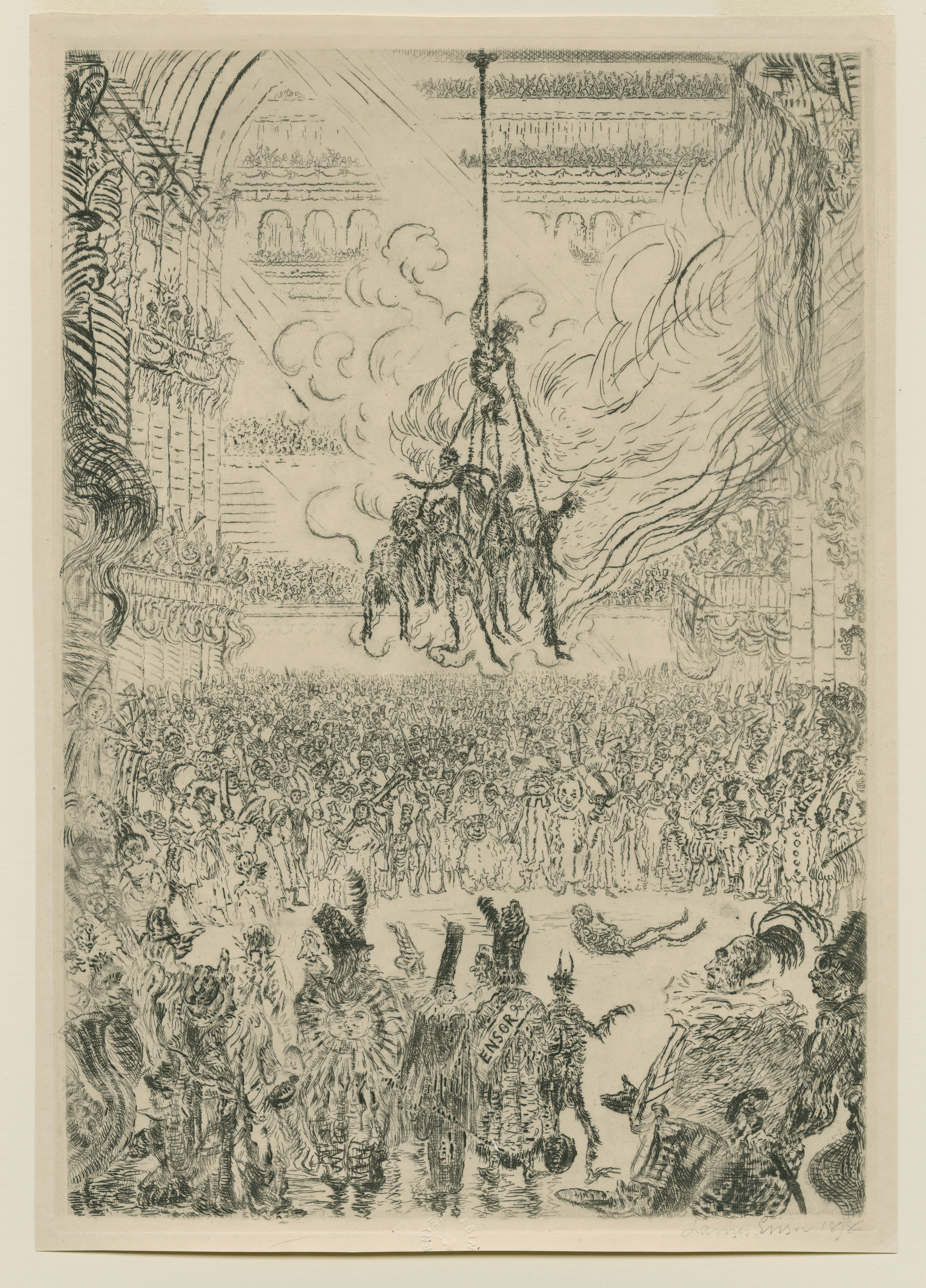
Illustration by James Ensor, 1898

The story, like "The Cask of Amontillado", is one of Poe's revenge tales, in which a murderer apparently escapes without punishment. In "The Cask of Amontillado", the victim wears motley; in "Hop-Frog", the murderer also dons such attire. However, while "The Cask of Amontillado" is told from the murderer's point of view, "Hop-Frog" is told from an unidentified third-person narrator's point of view.

The grating of Hop-Frog's teeth, right after Hop-Frog witnesses the king splash wine in Trippetta's face, and again just before Hop-Frog sets the eight men on fire, may well be symbolic. Poe often used teeth as a sign of mortality, as with the lips writhing about the teeth of the mesmerized man in "The Facts in the Case of M. Valdemar" or the obsession with teeth in "Berenice".

"The Cask of Amontillado" represents Poe's attempt at literary revenge on a personal enemy, and "Hop-Frog" may have had a similar motivation. As Poe had been pursuing relationships with Sarah Helen Whitman and Nancy Richmond (whether romantic or platonic is uncertain), members of literary circles in New York City spread gossip and incited scandal about alleged improprieties. At the center of this gossip was a woman named Elizabeth F. Ellet, whose affections Poe had previously scorned. Ellet may be represented by the king himself, with his seven councilors representing Margaret Fuller, Hiram Fuller (no relation), Thomas Dunn English, Anne Lynch Botta, Anna Blackwell, Ermina Jane Locke, and Locke's husband.

The tale is arguably autobiographical in other ways. The jester Hop-Frog, like Poe, is "kidnapped from home and presented to the king" (his wealthy foster father John Allan), "bearing a name not given in baptism but 'conferred upon him'" and is susceptible to wine ... when insulted and forced to drink becomes insane with rage". Like Hop-Frog, Poe was bothered by those who urged him to drink, despite a single glass of wine making him drunk.

Poe could have based the story on the Bal des Ardents at the court of Charles VI of France in January 1393. At the suggestion of a Norman squire, the king and five others dressed as Wild Men in highly flammable costumes made with pitch and flax. When a candle was mistakenly brought into the tent where the performance was occurring, the fire quickly spread to the performers within the close quarters, four of whom would die from the wounds, the King only being saved by the quick thinking of his aunt Joan, Duchess of Berry, who protected him from the flames beneath the folds of her great skirt. Citing Barbara Tuchman as his source, Jack Morgan, of the University of Missouri–Rolla, author of The Biology of Horror, discusses the incident as a possible inspiration for "Hop-Frog".

== Adaptations ==
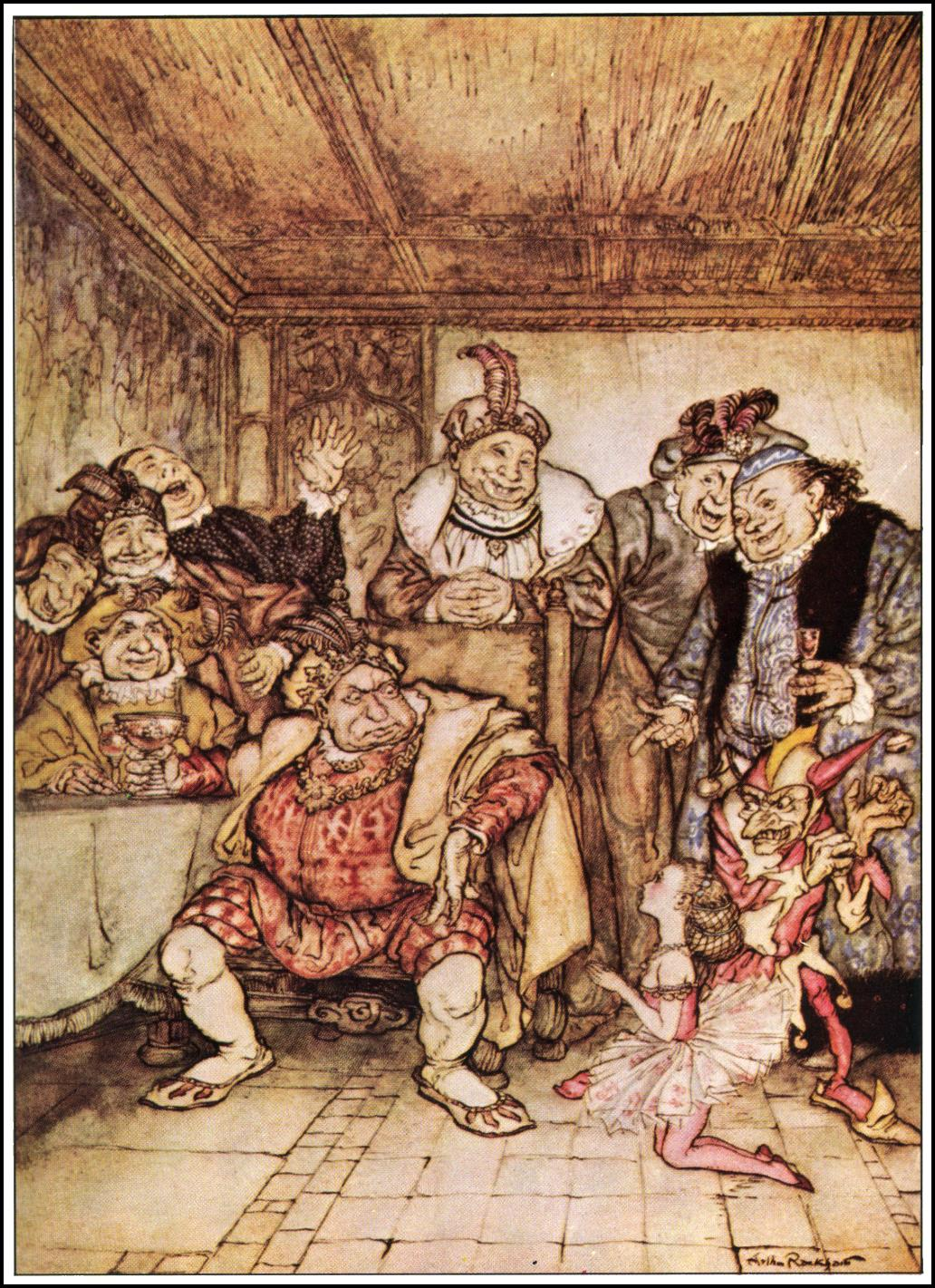
Hop-Frog, Trippetta, the king and his councilors, 1935 illustration by Arthur Rackham

- French director Henri Desfontaines made the earliest film adaptation of "Hop-Frog" in 1910.
- James Ensor's 1896 painting titled, Hop-Frog's Revenge, is based on the story.
- A 1926 symphony by Eugene Cools was inspired by and named after Hop-Frog.
- A plot similar to "Hop-Frog" is used as a side plot in Roger Corman's The Masque of the Red Death (1964), starring Vincent Price as "Prince Prospero". Enraged by Prospero's friend Alfredo's slapping his dancing partner Esmeralda for accidentally knocking his cup of wine during her dance number, the dwarf artist sets him on fire during the masquerade after dressing him up in a gorilla costume. Hop-Frog (called Hop-Toad in the film) is played by the actor Skip Martin, who was a "little person", but Esmeralda (analogous to Trippetta from the short story) is played by a child overdubbed with an older woman's voice.
- Elements of the tale are suggested in climax of the 1962 Universal/Hammer adaptation of The Phantom of the Opera (directed by Terence Fisher), the idea of a dwarf utilizing a chandelier as a murder weapon being particularly noteworthy.
- Illustrated versions of the story appeared in the horror comic magazines Nightmare and Creepy.
- In 1992, Julie Taymor directed a short film entitled Fool's Fire adapted from "Hop-Frog". Michael J. Anderson of Twin Peaks fame starred as "Hop-Frog" and Mireille Mosse as "Trippetta", with Tom Hewitt as "The King". The film aired on PBS's American Playhouse and depicts all "normal" characters being dressed in masks and costumes (designed by Taymor) with only Hop-Frog and Trippetta shown as they truly are. Poe's poems "The Bells" and "A Dream Within a Dream" are also used as part of the story.
- A radio-drama production of "Hop-Frog" was broadcast in 1998 in the Radio Tales series on National Public Radio. The story was performed by Winifred Phillips and included music composed by her.
- The story features as part of Lou Reed's 2003 double album The Raven. One of the tracks is a song called "Hop-Frog" sung by David Bowie.
- Lance Tait's 2003 play Hop-Frog is based on this story. Laura Grace Pattillo wrote in The Edgar Allan Poe Review (2006), "a visually striking piece of theatrical storytelling, is Tait's adaptation of 'Hop-Frog'. In this play, the device of the Chorus functions exceptionally well, as one male and one female actor help narrate the story and speak for all of the supporting characters, who are represented by objects such as a long piece of wood and a collection of candles."
- In 2020, the British experimental rock band Black Midi adapted "Hop-Frog" as a spoken-word piece with instrumental accompaniment on their album The Black Midi Anthology Vol. 1: Tales of Suspense and Revenge. The story is narrated by lead singer Geordie Greep.
