= Newton Talbot =

American politician

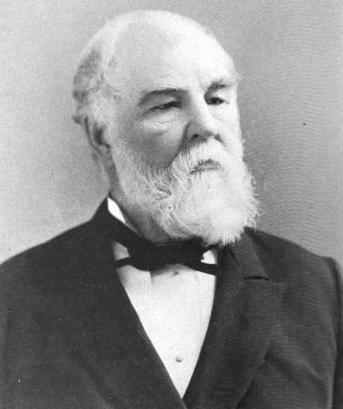

Chairman of the Boston Board of Aldermen
- In office 1870
- Preceded by: Benjamin James
- Succeeded by: Charles Edward Jenkins

Personal details
- Born: March 10, 1815 Stoughton, Massachusetts
- Died: February 3, 1904 (aged 88) Boston
- Party: Republican
- Spouse: Calista Harvey Clement (1867–1904; his death)

Newton Talbot (March 10, 1815 – February 3, 1904) was an American publisher, politician, and administrator at Tufts College.

== Early life ==
Talbot was born on March 10, 1815, in Stoughton, Massachusetts. He was the youngest of eight children born to Richard and Rebekah (Smith) Talbot. Tabot's mother died when he was two and his father died when he was fifteen.

In 1836, Talbot moved to Boston, where he apprenticed as a clerk in a shoe store. From 1838 to 1841 he sold shoes with business partner Alanson Belcher. In 1842, Talbot opened his own shoe store. He later served as an inspector at the Boston Custom House. In 1849, Talbot left Boston to take part in California Gold Rush. He left New York City for San Francisco on June 30, 1849, and arrived in California on August 16, 1849. Talbot returned to Boston in 1850.

== Publishing ==
In 1851, Talbot became a cashier in the office Frederick Gleason, publisher of Gleason's Pictorial Drawing-Room Companion and The Flag of Our Union. In 1855, Gleason sold his business to managing editor Maturin Murray Ballou and Talbot continued on under Ballou. In 1863, Ballou left publishing to focus on commercial real estate business and Talbot, James R. Elliott, and William H. Thomes purchased the business. Elliott left the partnership in 1869 and Thomes and Talbot continued the business until 1885.

== Politics ==
Talbot was a member of the Massachusetts House of Representatives in 1857. From 1867 to 1870 he was a member of the Boston Board of Aldermen. He was chairman of the board during his final year on it. He was the Republican nominee during the 1871 Boston mayoral election. He lost to Democrat William Gaston 61% to 39%. From 1871 to 1890 he was a member of the city's Sinking Fund Board/Sinking Fund Commission.

After the Great Boston Fire of 1872, Talbot was elected Boston Street Commissioner. He served until 1883. During his tenure, Talbot oversaw the reconstruction the streets destroyed by the fire, the extension of Huntington Avenue and Boylston Street, and the construction of a number of new streets (including Talbot Avenue in Dorchester).

== Personal life ==
On January 14, 1867, Talbot married Calista Harvey Clement of Groton, New Hampshire. They had one child, Bessie Talbot (1869–1883). Talbot was a Universalist. He attended First Parish Church of Stoughton and the Second Universalist Church of Boston.

In 1874, Talbot joined the Massachusetts Charitable Mechanic Association. From 1885 to 1887 he served as the association's president. He was also a member of the New England Historic Genealogical Society, the University Club, and the Boston Club, a trustee of the Home Savings Bank of Boston, a founder of the Stoughton Historical Society, and treasurer of the Evergreen Cemetery Association of Stoughton.

== Tufts College ==
In 1868, Talbot was elected to the Tufts College board of trustees. On November 8, 1886, he became Tufts' treasurer, a position he held until his death on February 3, 1904. He was survived by his wife, who died soon thereafter on March 4, 1904. He was buried in Evergreen Cemetery in Stoughton.
