= A Dream Within a Dream =

Poem by Edgar Allan Poe

- by Edgar Allan Poe
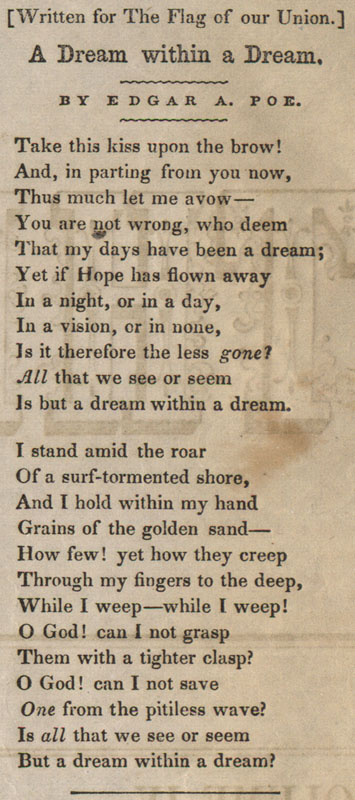
- First published appearance in The Flag of Our Union
- First published in: The Flag of Our Union
- Publication date: March 1849
- Lines: 24

Full text
- A Dream Within a Dream at Wikisource

A DREAM WITHIN A DREAM.

Take this kiss upon the brow!
And, in parting from you now,
Thus much let me avow—
You are not wrong, who deem
That my days have been a dream;
Yet if hope has flown away
In a night, or in a day,
In a vision, or in none,
Is it therefore the less gone?
All that we see or seem
Is but a dream within a dream.

I stand amid the roar
Of a surf-tormented shore,
And I hold within my hand
Grains of the golden sand—
How few! yet how they creep
Through my fingers to the deep,
While I weep—while I weep!
O God! can I not grasp
Them with a tighter clasp?
O God! can I not save
One from the pitiless wave?
Is all that we see or seem
But a dream within a dream?

Reading of the poem "A Dream Within a Dream"

"A Dream Within a Dream" is a poem written by American poet Edgar Allan Poe, first published in 1849. The poem has 24 lines, divided into two stanzas.

== Analysis ==
The poem dramatizes the confusion felt by the narrator as he watches the important things in life slip away. Realizing he cannot hold on to even one grain of sand, he is led to his final question whether all things are just a dream.

It has been suggested that the "golden sand" referenced in the 15th line signifies that which is to be found in an hourglass, consequently time itself. Another interpretation holds that the expression evokes an image derived from the 1848 finding of gold in California. The latter interpretation seems unlikely, however, given the presence of the four, almost identical, lines describing the sand in another poem "To ——," which is regarded as a blueprint for "A Dream Within a Dream" and preceding its publication by two decades.

== Publication history ==
The poem was first published in the March 31, 1849, edition of the Boston-based story paper The Flag of Our Union. The same publication had only two weeks before first published Poe's short story "Hop-Frog". The next month, owner Frederick Gleason announced it could no longer pay for whatever articles or poems it published.

== Adaptations ==
- Picnic at Hanging Rock, a story about a group of girls disappearing while on a field trip to a rock formation in the early 20th century, begins with a voice over that states "What we see and what we seem is but a dream. A dream within a dream".
- The Alan Parsons Project's album Tales of Mystery and Imagination (Edgar Allan Poe) opens with an instrumental homage to the poem also titled "A Dream Within a Dream". Its 1987 re-release included a narration of the original poem by Orson Welles.
- The Propaganda album A Secret Wish, released in 1985, opens with the track "Dream Within A Dream". The poem is recited in spoken-word form by vocalist Susanne Freytag.
- Biological Radio, the 1997 Dreadzone album, features the track "Dream Within A Dream" which quotes lines from the poem.
- The Yardbirds' recorded a musical adaptation for their 2003 album Birdland, adding a new verse of their own.
- Elysian Fields recorded a musical adaptation of the song.
- Sopor Aeternus and The Ensemble of Shadows adapted the poem for their album Poetica - All Beauty Sleeps.
- Korean boy group NCT utilized the poem as a concept base, mentioning "Dream Within a Dream" several times throughout their discography. Examples include "Dream in a Dream" by TEN (NCT 2018 Empathy, 2018) and "INTERLUDE: Regular-Irregular" by NCT 127 (Regular-Irregular, 2018), with additional references in media.
- Polish singers Sanah and Grzegorz Turnau recorded a song, "Sen we śnie", which uses Poe's poem translated to Polish by poet and translator Włodzimierz Lewik as its lyrics.
