= The Shamrock (newspaper) =

Irish weekly literary paper

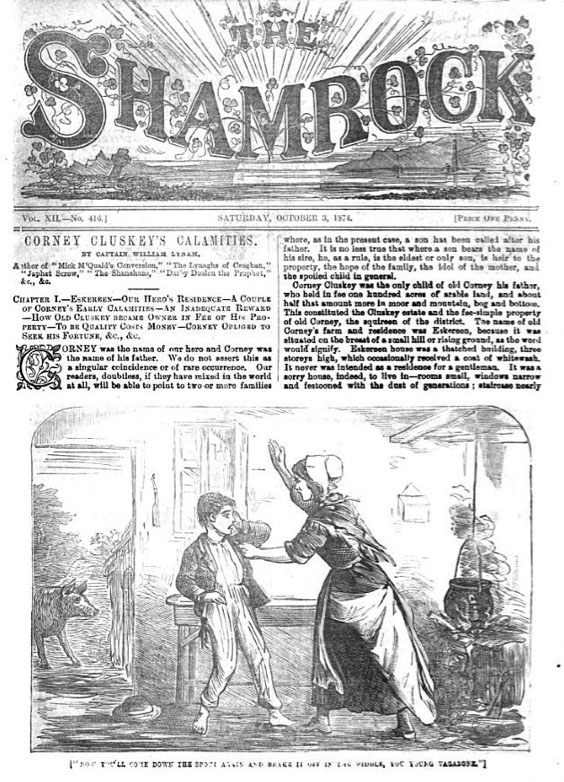
- Front page on 3 October 1874
- Categories: Irish literature, culture, poetry, Gaelic
- Frequency: Weekly
- Founded: 1866
- First issue: 6 October 1866
- Final issue: 10 August 1912
- Country: Ireland
- Based in: Dublin
- Language: English

The Shamrock was an Irish literary newspaper published in Dublin from 1866 to 1912. It was a nationalist weekly publication printed and circulated every Saturday. Noteworthy illustrators, writers, and editors of the time, including William O'Brien, Ireland’s first investigative journalist, contributed to the paper. The Shamrock merged with the Irish Emerald in 1912, which continued to circulate until 1922.

== History ==
Founded in 1866, The Shamrock was initially published under Richard Pigott until 1879. William Francis Lynam, a soldier and writer, also served as one of the paper's proprietors and editors during this time. Pigott, journalist and newspaper owner, later gained infamy as a forger. He established a career as a publisher and owner of newspapers, including influential nationalist titles such as the Flag of Ireland and the Irishman.

The Shamrock was sold weekly at a penny to readers. In 1879, Pigott sold The Shamrock and his other titles to the Irish National Newspaper and Publishing Company, owned by Irish nationalist politician Charles Stewart Parnell and his Irish National League party. The paper continued under Parnell's ownership, with William O'Brien taking over as editor in 1881. O'Brien significantly impacted Ireland's late 19th-century media practices with his pioneering investigative journalism at the time.

A weekly illustrated newspaper, The Shamrock, first appeared on October 6, 1866, and its last publication appeared on August 10, 1912. It merged with the Irish Emerald on August 17, 1912, eventually ceasing publication on May 27, 1922. The newspaper was popular, even shipped to Europe and America on a subscription basis.

== Content ==
The Shamrock primarily tailored its content as entertainment to appeal to the younger audiences with illustrated front pages and content featuring fictional and mildly educational articles. It included short stories, serials, historical topics, Gaelic prose, and poetry. Contributors included writers such as Bram Stoker, who published two short stories, "Buried Treasures" and "The Chain of Destiny", and a serial novel in 1875, The Primrose Path.

The most popular serial on the paper featured the tales the fictitious character Mick McQuaid, created by Lynam in 1867. McQuaid, a combination hero and rascal, became a best-seller with various adventures set in different professions. Lynam died in 1894, but The Shamrock and Mick McQuaid's stories continued with other writers, even after the merger with the Irish Emerald.

In 1889, Carroll's, a tobacco manufacturer, named a brand of pipe tobacco after Mick McQuaid, who often smoked a pipe in the stories. In the 1920s, Mick McQuaid featured on the company's adverts and packaging as a cartoon character for the tobacco, which was discontinued in 2016.

== Proprietors, publishers, editors and contributors ==
- Irish National Newspaper and Publishing Co. (1879)
- Richard Pigott (1866-1879)
- T.R. Herrington
- Richard Pigott (1866-1879)
- John S.C. Abbott (1880)
- Max Adeler (1880)
- Hans Christian Andersen (1870)
- Gougane Barra (1881)
- Josh Billings (pseud. Henry Wheeler Shaw)
- M.P. Boulebane
- James J. Bourke (1870)
- Thomas Burke
- Dr. J.T. Champion (1870)
- William Carleton (novelist)
- J. Carolina (1870)
- John Keegan Casey
- Austin Clark (poet) (1920)
- T.C.S. Corry
- Gustave Doré (illustrator, 1867)
- Alice Dale (1881)
- James Dunne
- Francis Alexander Durivage (1881)
- Eirronach
- Fanny Fisher (1887)
- Edmund Fitzpatrick (illustrator)
- Harry Furniss (illustrator)
- J.D. Heigh (illustrator, 1887)
- Denis Holland
- Douglas Hyde
- Thomas Caulfield Irwin
- Robert Dwyer Joyce
- Rose Kavanagh
- Charles Kickham
- William F. Lynam
- Martin MacDermott (poetry, 1880)
- Patrick Joseph McCall
- Merva (1880)
- Montbard (illustrator)
- J. Murphy
- Muskerry
- Milton Nobles (1881)
- John F. O'Donnell
- William O'Donovan
- Darby O'Quill
- J. Boyle O'Reilly
- John Augustus O'Shea
- John J. O'Shea (1887)
- Outre
- M.T. Pender
- John Reville
- Owen Roe (1880-1881)
- Ruby (1880)
- Dora Russell (fiction, 1881)
- Edward Shiel (illustrator)
- Bram Stoker
- Tiria (1880)
- William Twamely (poetry, 1880-1881)
- Tynan Katherine
- V.V. (1880)
- Dr. J.C. Waters
