= Mary Bassett Clarke =

American writer (1831–1908)

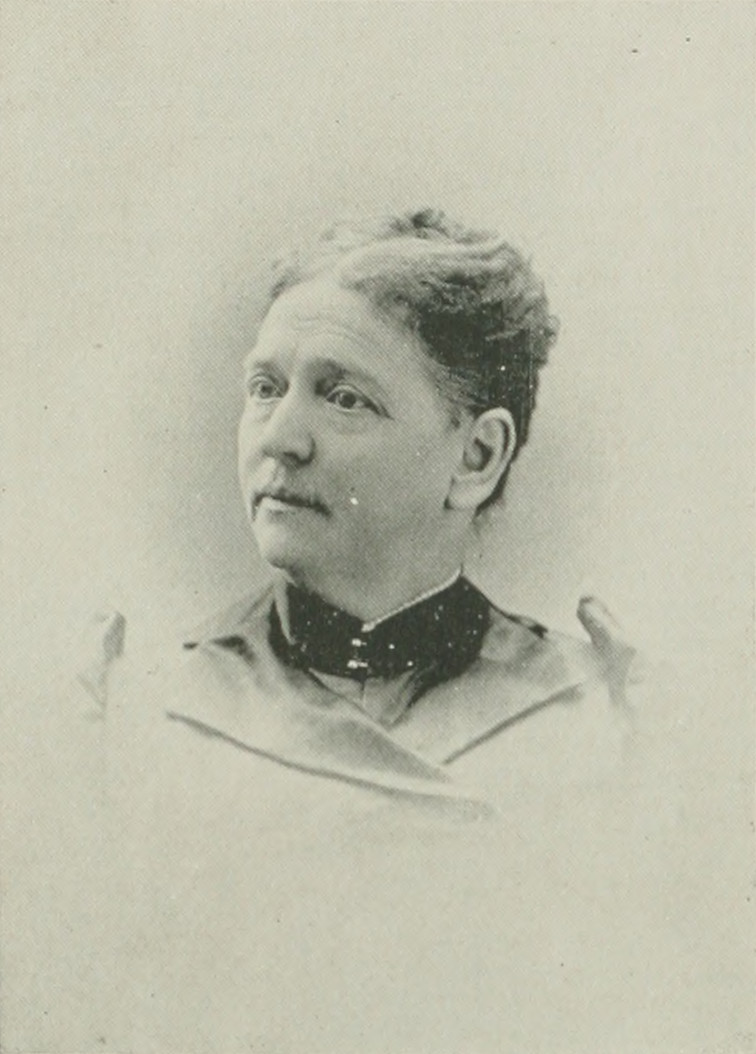
- Photo in A Woman of the Century
- Born: Mary Bassett; November 18, 1831; Independence, New York, U.S.
- Died: August 2, 1908 (aged 76)
- Resting place: Oak Grove Cemetery, Hopkinton, Rhode Island, U.S.
- Education: Alfred University
- Occupation: writer
- Spouse: William Lewis Clarke (m. 1859)
- Children: Ada; John; Charles
- Parents: John Chandler Bassett; Martha (St. John) Bassett
- Writing career
- Pen name: Ida Fairfield

Mary Bassett Clarke (née, Bassett; pen name, Ida Fairfield; November 18, 1831 – August 2, 1908) was an American writer of the long nineteenth century. She was a contributor to The Flag of Our Union, Rural New Yorker, as well as periodicals issued by the Seventh Day Baptists. Autumn Leaves was published in 1894.

== Early life and education ==
Mary Bassett was born in Independence, New York, November 18, 1831. She was the daughter of John Chandler Bassett, a well-to-do farmer of western New York, and Martha (St. John) Bassett. She was the seventh in a family of twelve children who lived to maturity. She was educated in Alfred University. Although ill-health limited her opportunities, she was graduated from the university in 1857.

== Career ==
At the age of fifteen, she began writing for publication, under the pen-name "Ida Fairfield," in The Flag of Our Union. With some interruption by ill-health, she continued many years to be a contributor to that paper, to the Rural New Yorker, as well as local papers and periodicals. For several years her writings, both prose and verse, were principally given to periodicals issued by the Seventh Day Baptists, of which religion she was a member. A collection of her poems, Autumn Leaves, was published in 1894 (Buffalo).

== Personal life ==
She married William Lewis Clarke (1835–1920) on September 8, 1859, and removed to Ashaway, Rhode Island. He served as president of the Missionary Board, and as a Massachusetts State Senator. The Clarke's had three children: Ada Augusta (b. 1861), John Thomas (b. 1863), and Charles Welling (b. 1865). Mary Bassett Clarke died August 2, 1908.

== Selected works ==
- 1894, Autumn Leaves
