= Rural New Yorker =

Newspaper in New York

The Rural New Yorker
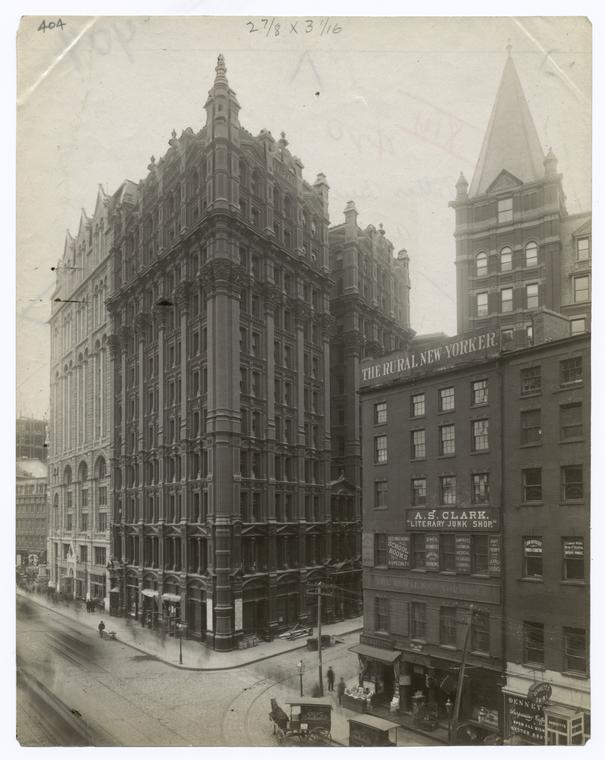
- Rural New Yorker offices to right at 34 Park Row circa 1886
- Owner(s): D.D.T. Moore (original)
- Founded: 1850
- Ceased publication: 1964 (merger)
- Headquarters: Rochester, New York (original); Manhattan (by 1870s)
- Circulation: 300,000 (1956)

Rural New Yorker was a weekly periodical founded in 1850 that was published by the Rural Publishing Co., New York City. The magazine continued through the middle of the 20th century.

== History ==
Daniel D.T. Moore founded the publication as Moore's Rural New Yorker in Rochester, New York in 1850. Moore later became mayor of Rochester in 1865. After moving the paper to New York City (it opened a branch office at the old New York Times building at 41 Park Row by 1869), financial setbacks caused him to give up the paper in the 1870s.

After moving to New York City, the paper eventually had offices at 34 Park Row, the Scott & Bowne Building at Chambers and Pearl Streets (409 Pearl), and around 1911 it moved to the old Chelsea Methodist Church on West Thirtieth Street, where it remained for many years.

John J. Dillon was editor and publisher of the paper for over 58 years, from about 1892 until his death in 1950. Mary Bassett Clarke wrote for the paper. A quilt pattern column was published under the name of "Mrs. R.E. Smith" from 1930 to 1937.

Starting in 1890 it ran the motto "A Square Deal" to reflect the fact that it guaranteed that subscribers would not be treated unfairly by its advertisers, taking great efforts to make them whole.

As of 1956, the publication still had 300,000 subscribers. It was acquired by American Agriculturist and merged in 1964, which is now published by Farm Progress.
