= Lance Tait =

American playwright and filmmaker

Lance Tait is an American playwright, screenwriter, filmmaker and composer. Tait has written over forty full length and one act plays, including seventeen plays based on short stories of Edgar Allan Poe. He has also published two books of comedy sketches. He is also active as a filmmaker, best known for the viral YouTube hit Sex in Advertising. In 2002, Tait founded the English-language performing arts group Theatre Metropole in Paris, France.

== Works for the stage ==
- The Babysitter (1995)
- Something Special, Jesus and the Monkfish, and East Play (1997)
- David Mamet Fan Club and Behave My Sorrow (1998)
- Miss Julie, after August Strindberg (1999)
- Live Free or Die (1999)
- Edwin Booth (2000)
- Dmitri, Read to Me, Betsy Philadelphia, A Family Portrait, Mad Cow Disease in America, The Swimming Pools of Paris and The Glass Ceiling (2001)
- The Fall of the House of Usher, The Imp of the Perverse, Some Words with a Mummy, The Oval Portrait, and Landor's Cottage Revisited (2002)
- Never Let Them See You Sweat and Conquests (2002)
- Spectacles, Hop-Frog, The Man of the Crowd, The Power of Words, and The Man That Was Used Up (2003)
- Synesthesia (2003)
- Helen, a musical (2004)
- Comedy Sketches I (2005)
- The Facts in the Case of M. Valdemar, Memories of August Bedloe, A Predicament and The Lovers (2005)
- Comedy Sketches II (2006)
- Neither God Nor Master (2006)
- Comedy Sketches III (2007)
- Comedy Sketches IV (2009)
- Car Door Shave (2011)
- The Black Cat (2011)
- Gambling Fever (2012)
- Comedy Sketches V (2013)
- The Cask of Amontillado and The Purloined Letter (2013)
- Comedy Sketches VI (2014)

== Bibliography ==
- The Black Cat and Other Plays, Adapted from Stories by Edgar Allan Poe
- Car Door Shave/Gambling Fever/Neither God Nor Master
- Little White Book of Comedy Sketches
- Little Black Book of Comedy Sketches
- Synesthesia
- Esoteric Plays
- Something Special
- The Swimming Pools of Paris
- The Fall of the House of Usher and Other Plays Inspired by Edgar Allan Poe
- Mad Cow Disease In America, Something Special and Other Plays
- Edwin Booth: a Play in Two Acts
- Miss Julie, David Mamet Fan Club and Other Plays
