= The Black Cat (short story) =

Short story by Edgar Allan Poe

- Short story by Edgar Allan Poe
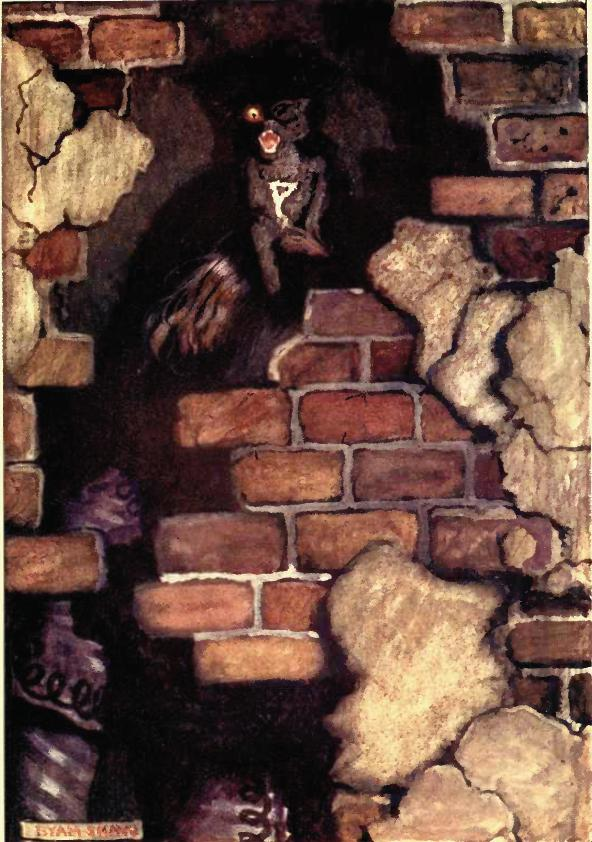
- Early 20th-century illustration by Byam Shaw

Text available at Wikisource
- Country: United States
- Language: English
- Genres: Horror fiction, Gothic literature

Publication
- Publisher: United States Saturday Post
- Media type: Print (periodical)

"The Black Cat" is a short story by the American writer Edgar Allan Poe. It was first published in the August 19, 1843, edition of The Saturday Evening Post. In the story, an unnamed narrator, who suffers with alcoholism, has a strong affection for pets, until he perversely turns to abusing them. His favorite, a pet black cat, bites him one night and the narrator punishes it by cutting its eye out. The narrator then becomes conflicted when the black cat fears him. In a drunken rage, he then hangs it from a tree. His house later burns down, but one remaining wall shows a burned outline of a cat hanging from a noose. He soon finds another black cat, similar to the first except for a white mark on its chest. But he develops a hatred for it as well, for it resembles the cat he killed in his drunken rage. He attempts to kill the cat with an axe but his wife stops him; instead, the narrator murders his wife. He conceals the body behind a brick wall in his basement. The police soon come and, after the narrator's tapping on the wall is met with a shrieking sound, they find not only the wife's corpse but also the black cat that had been accidentally walled in with the body and alerted them with its cry.

The story is a study of the psychology of guilt, often paired in analysis with Poe's "The Tell-Tale Heart". In both, a murderer carefully conceals his crime and believes himself unassailable, but eventually breaks down and reveals himself, impelled by a nagging reminder of his guilt. "The Black Cat", which also features questions of sanity versus insanity, is Poe's strongest warning against the dangers of alcoholism.

== Plot ==
The story is presented as a first-person narrative, using an unnamed unreliable narrator who is awaiting execution. He describes his lifelong love of animals, along with the many pets that he and his wife have taken in, including a large black cat named Pluto. The narrator and Pluto become particularly fond of each other, but after several years the narrator becomes an alcoholic and begins to mistreat his pets. After a night of heavy drinking, he believes that Pluto is avoiding him and seizes the cat, only to suffer a bite on his hand. Enraged, he gouges out one of the cat's eyes.

From that moment on, Pluto flees in terror at the narrator's approach. The narrator feels remorse for his cruelty at first, but soon becomes increasingly irritated at the cat's behavior. In a sudden fit of rage, he ties a noose around Pluto's neck and hangs him from a tree, where the cat dies. The narrator's house mysteriously burns down that night. He, his wife, and their servant escape unharmed, but lose all of their possessions. The house collapses, except for one wall that displays the indented image of a gigantic cat with a noose around its neck. The narrator is initially disturbed by this phenomenon but soon constructs a plausible explanation, thinking that someone may have cut the cat's corpse down from the tree and thrown it into the bedroom to wake him during the fire, where it struck a patch of fresh plaster.

Feeling guilty for his actions, the narrator subsequently finds another black cat at a tavern and adopts it. This cat is roughly the same size as Pluto and also missing one eye, but has a large patch of white fur on its chest that Pluto lacked. Over time, the narrator begins to fear and loathe the cat, as it reminds him of his cruelty toward Pluto, and sees to his horror that the white patch is slowly taking the shape of a gallows. He tries to kill the cat with an axe, but his wife stops him. Infuriated at his wife's interference, he kills her instead and hides the corpse in a cellar wall. Upon finishing his work, he finds that the cat has disappeared and is now able to sleep freely at night.

Four days later, the police search the house but can find no trace of the narrator's missing wife. He accompanies them into the cellar, boasting of the sturdiness of its walls and striking the one he has built to conceal his wife's corpse. An unearthly howl issues from behind it, shattering the narrator's mental state completely. The police tear down the wall and find the corpse, with the cat alive and sitting atop his wife's head, having been walled in with her.

== Publication history ==
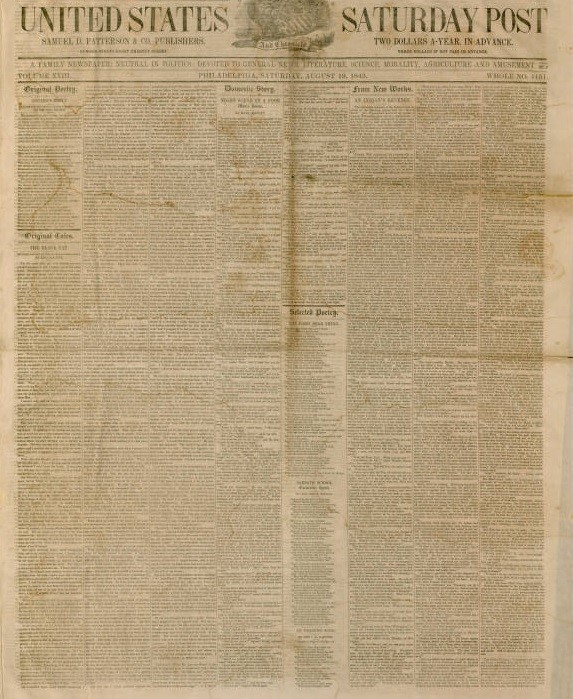
First appearance in the United States Saturday Post, August 19, 1843, front page, Philadelphia

"The Black Cat" was first published in the August 19, 1843, issue of The Saturday Evening Post. At the time, the publication was using the temporary title United States Saturday Post. The story was reprinted in The Baltimore Sun and The Pensacola Gazette that same year. Readers immediately responded favorably to the story, spawning parodies including Thomas Dunn English's "The Ghost of the Grey Tadpole". It has been anthologized many times, including in The Second Pan Book of Horror Stories (1960) and in American Gothic Tales (1996).

== Analysis ==
Like the narrator in Poe's "The Tell-Tale Heart", the narrator of "The Black Cat" is of questionable sanity. In the beginning of the tale, the narrator says that he would be "mad indeed" should he expect a reader to believe the story, implying that he has already been accused of madness.

The extent to which the narrator claims to have loved his animals suggests mental instability in the form of having “too much of a good thing”. His partiality for animals substitutes “the paltry friendship and gossamer fidelity of mere Man”. Since the narrator's wife shares his love of animals, he likely thinks of her as another pet, seeing as he distrusts and dislikes humans. Additionally, his failure to understand his excessive love of animals foreshadows his inability to explain his motives for his actions.

One of Poe's darkest tales, "The Black Cat" includes his strongest denunciation of alcohol. The narrator's perverse actions are brought on by his alcoholism, a "disease" and "fiend" which also destroys his personality. The use of the black cat evokes various superstitions, including the idea voiced by the narrator's wife that they are all witches in disguise. Poe owned a black cat. In his "Instinct vs Reason – A Black Cat" he stated: "The writer of this article is the owner of one of the most remarkable black cats in the world – and this is saying much; for it will be remembered that black cats are all of them witches." In Scottish and Irish mythology, the Cat-sìth is described as being a black cat with a white spot on its chest, not unlike the cat the narrator finds in the tavern. The eponymous cat is named Pluto after the Roman god of the Underworld.

Although Pluto is a neutral character at the beginning of the story, he becomes antagonistic in the narrator's eyes once the narrator becomes an alcoholic. The alcohol pushes the narrator into fits of intemperance and violence, to the point at which everything angers him – Pluto in particular, who is always by his side, becomes the malevolent witch who haunts him even while avoiding his presence. When the narrator cuts Pluto's eye from its socket, this can be seen as symbolic of self-inflicted partial blindness to his own vision of moral goodness.

The fire that destroys the narrator's house symbolizes the narrator's "almost complete moral disintegration". The only remainder is the impression of Pluto upon the wall, which represents his unforgivable and incorrigible sin.

From a rhetorician's standpoint, an effective scheme of omission that Poe employs is diazeugma, or using many verbs for one subject; it omits pronouns. Diazeugma emphasizes actions and makes the narrative swift and brief.

== Adaptations ==
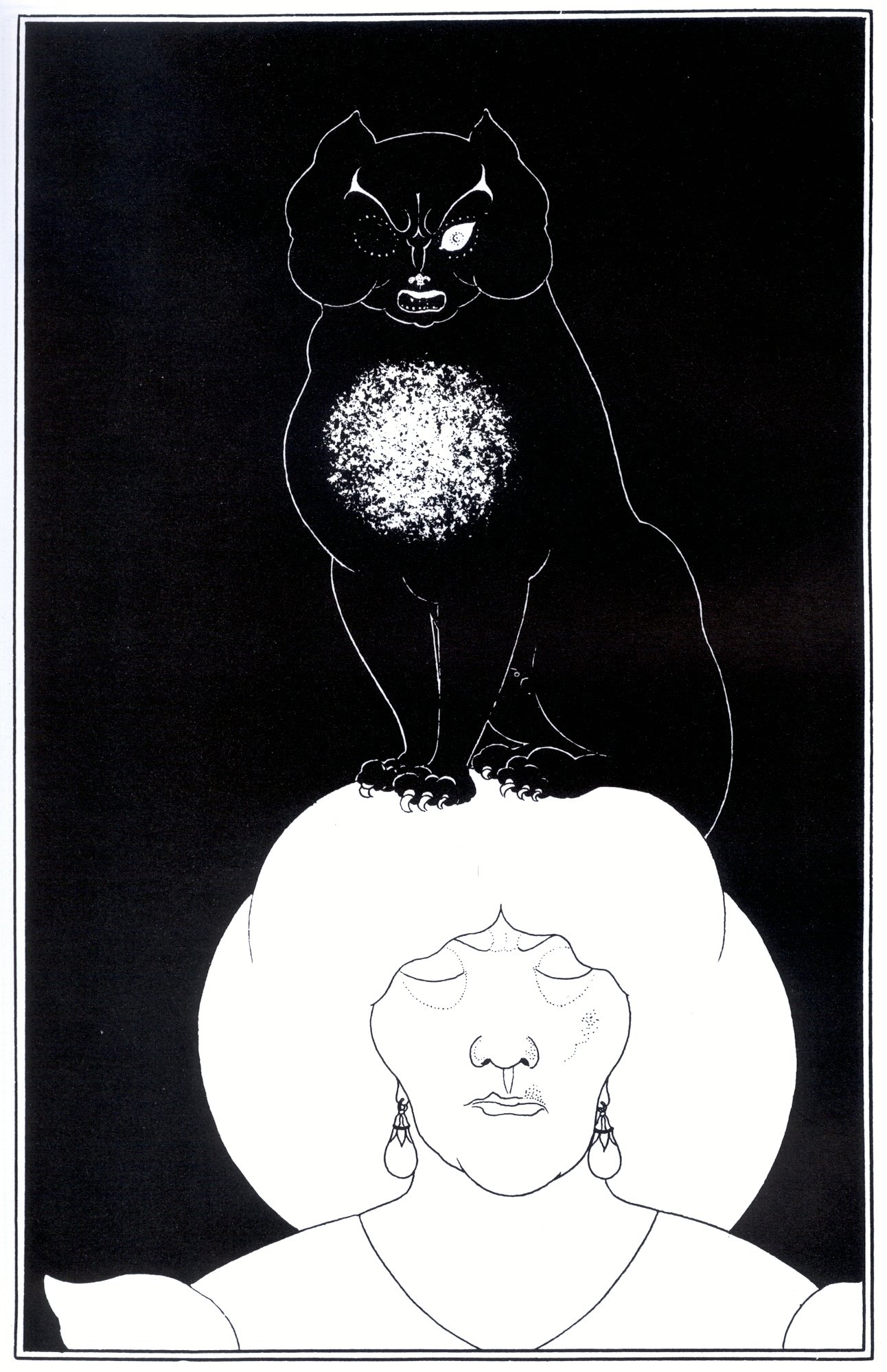
Illustration for "The Black Cat" by Aubrey Beardsley (1894–1895)

- In 1910–11, Futurist artist Gino Severini painted "The Black Cat" in direct reference to Poe's short story.
- Unheimliche Geschichten (a.k.a. Uncanny Stories, The Living Dead) is a 1932 German horror film which merges three Poe short stories and Robert Louis Stevenson's The Suicide Club.
- Universal Pictures made two films titled The Black Cat, one in 1934, starring Bela Lugosi and Boris Karloff, and another in 1941, starring Lugosi and Basil Rathbone. Both films claimed to have been "suggested by" Poe's story, but neither bears any resemblance to the tale, aside from the presence of a black cat. Elements of Poe's story were, however, used in the 1934 film Maniac.
- "The Black Cat" was adapted into a seven-page comic strip in Yellowjacket Comics #1 (1944).
- Sept. 18, 1947, Mystery in the Air radio program with Peter Lorre as the protagonist in "The Black Cat". Note: the cat's eye is not gouged out. Instead, the cat's ear is torn.
- Issue #15 of the comic book The Haunt of Fear, published 1953, features a story titled "The Wall" that is derived from both "The Black Cat" and "The Tell-Tale Heart".
- The middle segment of director Roger Corman's 1962 anthology film Tales of Terror combines the story of "The Black Cat" with that of another Poe tale, "The Cask of Amontillado." This version stars Peter Lorre as the main character (given the name Montresor Herringbone) and Vincent Price as Fortunato Luchresi. The amalgamation of the two stories provides a motive for the murderer: Fortunato has an affair with Montresor's wife.
- In 1966, The Black Cat, a version directed by Harold Hoffman and loosely based on Poe's story, was released starring Robert Frost, Robyn Baker and Sadie French.
- In 1970, Czech writer Ludvík Vaculík made many references to "A Descent into the Maelström", as well as "The Black Cat", in his novel The Guinea Pigs.
- In 1972, Poe's story was adapted in the Italian horror-giallo film Your Vice Is a Locked Room and Only I Have the Key, directed by Sergio Martino and starring Edwige Fenech, Anita Strindberg and Luigi Pistilli.
- In 1973, James Stewart recorded a reading of "The Black Cat" for BBC Radio.
- In 1974, Bernie Wrightson adapted the story as a comic in Creepy #62.
- Writer/director Lucio Fulci's 1981 film The Black Cat is loosely based on Poe's tale.
- The 1990 film Two Evil Eyes presents two Poe tales, "The Facts in the Case of M. Valdemar" and "The Black Cat." The former was written and directed by George A. Romero, while the latter was written and directed by Dario Argento. This version stars Harvey Keitel in the lead role.
- In 1997, a compilation of Poe's work was released on a double CD entitled Closed on Account of Rabies, with various celebrities lending their voices to the tales. "The Black Cat" was read by avant-garde performer Diamanda Galás.
- "The Black Cat" was adapted and performed with "The Cask of Amontillado" as Poe, Times Two: Twin tales of mystery, murder...and mortar—a double-bill of short, one-man plays written and performed by Greg Oliver Bodine. First produced in NYC at Manhattan Theatre Source in 2007, and again at WorkShop Theater Company in 2011. Part of the 2012 season at Cape May Stage in Cape May, NJ.
- "The Black Cat" is the 11th episode of the second season (2007) of the television series Masters of Horror. It was directed by Stuart Gordon, and features Jeffrey Combs as Poe. The plot essentially retells the short story in a semi-autobiographical manner, with Poe himself undergoing a series of events involving a black cat which he used to inspire the story of the same name.
- In 2012, Big Fish Games released a point and click mystery game loosely based on the story called Edgar Allan Poe's The Black Cat: Dark Tales
- In 2011, Hyper Aware Theater Company produced "The Black Cat", one of several Poe stage adaptations written by Lance Tait, as part of its “Gutterdrunk: The Poe Revisions” in New York City. Ava Caridad has written that in this stage adaptation the “unreliable narrator [has been changed] from male to female”... and this narrator has been split “into two separate characters representing one person.”
- The 2020 Ahoy Comics comic book Edgar Allan Poe's Snifter of Blood #1 includes a pastiche of the story by Paul Cornell and Russell Braun under the title "The Black ~~Cat~~ Dog". As the title suggests, the cat is replaced by a dog, who also narrates the story. However, he refuses to see his master in a bad light and is utterly unaware of the man's hatred or guilt.
- The fourth episode of the 2023 series The Fall of the House of Usher titled "The Black Cat" is loosely based on the story.
