= 1871 Boston mayoral election =

Election in Massachusetts, United States

- December 4, 1871
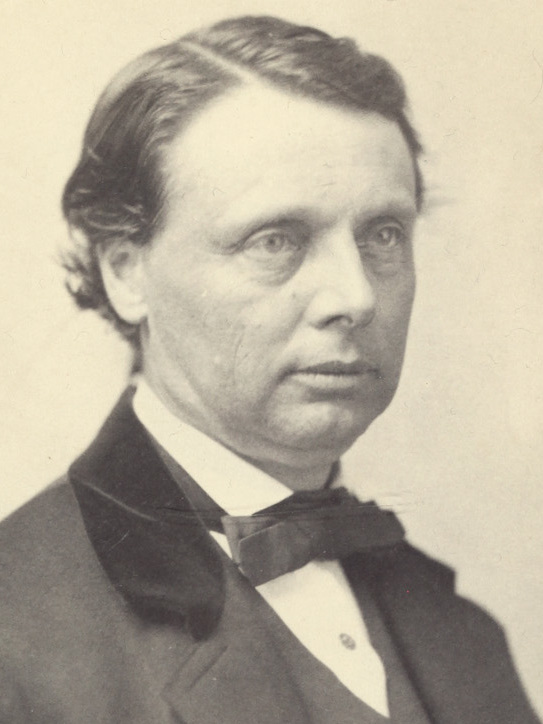

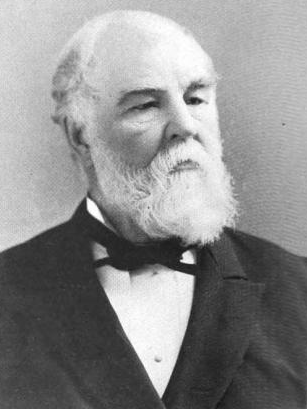
Candidate	William Gaston	Newton Talbot
Party	Democratic	Republican
Alliance	Labor Reform; Citizens'
Popular vote	9,838	6,231
Percentage	61.19%	38.76%
Mayor before election
William Gaston
Democratic
Elected mayor
William Gaston
Democratic

The Boston mayoral election of 1871 saw the reelection of incumbent Democrat William Gaston, who defeated Republican nominee Newton Talbot.

== Nominations ==
=== Democratic nomination ===
Incumbent Democratic Party mayor William Gaston was re-nominated by his party. He also received the nominations of the city's Labor-Reformers and Citizens' parties.

=== Republican nomination ===
On November 24, the city's Republican Ward and City Committee nominated Talbot for mayor at its meeting (held in the courtroom of the Second Superior Court).

Talbot was selected as the nominee nominee through a vote of the nominees. The ballot saw 85 delegates voting, and an individual required 49 votes in order to become the nominee. The balloting was as follows:

Republican convention balloting
Party	Candidate	Votes	%
Republican	Newton Talbot	74	87.06
Republican	William Gaston (incumbent)	8	9.41
Republican	William Gray	1	1.18
Republican	Robert C. Nichols	1	1.18
Republican	Joseph H. Chadwick	1	1.18

Talbot accepted the Republican nomination.

A November 28 convention at Mercantile Hall for a citizens ticket unanimously voted to nominate Talbot on that ticket as well.

== Results ==
The municipal election results were seen as forgoing typical party alignment in both the race for mayor and the chambers of the City Council.

1871 Boston mayoral election
Party	Candidate	Votes	%
Democratic	William Gaston (incumbent)	9,838	61.19
Republican	Newton Talbot	6,231	38.76
Others	Scattering	9	0.06
Turnout		16,078	

== See also ==
- List of mayors of Boston, Massachusetts
