= The Oval Portrait =

Short story by Edgar Allan Poe

- Short story by Edgar Allan Poe
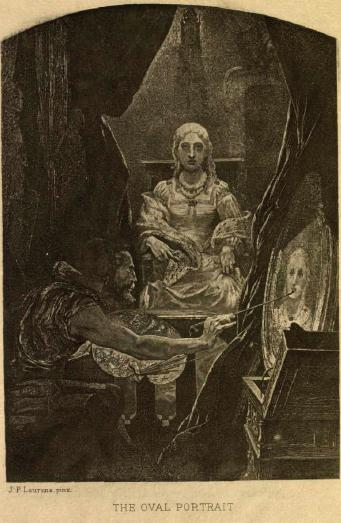
- Illustration by Jean-Paul Laurens for The Tales and Poems of Edgar Allan Poe. Vol. 2. Philadelphia: George Barrie, 1895.
- Original title: Life in Death
- Country: United States
- Language: English
- Genre: Horror

Publication
- Publisher: Graham's Magazine
- Media type: Print (periodical)
- Publication date: April 1842

"The Oval Portrait" is a horror short story by American writer Edgar Allan Poe, involving the disturbing circumstances of a portrait in a château. It is one of his shortest stories, filling only two pages in its initial publication in 1842.

== Plot summary ==
The tale begins with an injured narrator (the story offers no further explanation of his impairment) seeking refuge in an abandoned mansion in the Apennines. The narrator spends his time admiring the paintings that decorate the strangely shaped room and reading through a reference book, found on a pillow, that describes them.

Upon moving the candle closer to the book, the narrator discovers a before-unnoticed painting depicting the head and shoulders of a young girl. The picture inexplicably enthralls the narrator "for an hour perhaps". After steady reflection, he realizes that the painting's "absolute life-likeliness" of expression is the captivating feature. The narrator eagerly consults the book for an explanation of the picture. The remainder of the story is a quote from this book – a story within a story.

The book describes a tragic story involving a young maiden of "the rarest beauty". She loved and wedded an eccentric painter who cared more about his work than anything else in the world, including his wife. The painter eventually asked his wife to sit for him, and she obediently consented, sitting "meekly for many weeks" in his turret chamber. The painter worked so diligently at his task that he did not recognize his wife's fading health, as she, being a loving wife, continually "smiled on and still on, uncomplainingly". As the painter neared the end of his work, he let no one enter the turret chamber and rarely took his eyes off the canvas, even to watch his wife. After many weeks had passed, he finally finished his work. As he looked at the completed image, however, he felt appalled, as he exclaimed, "This is indeed Life itself!" After this, he turned suddenly to regard his bride and discovered that she had died.

== Analysis ==
The story's central theme revolves around the perplexing tension between art and life. In "The Oval Portrait", art and the addiction to it led to the young bride's death. Within this framework, art is deadly, and 'art' and 'life' cannot peacefully coexist. This tension reflects Poe's theory that poetry as art is the rhythmical creation of beauty, and that the death of a beautiful woman is the most poetical topic in the world (see "The Philosophy of Composition").

== Publication history ==
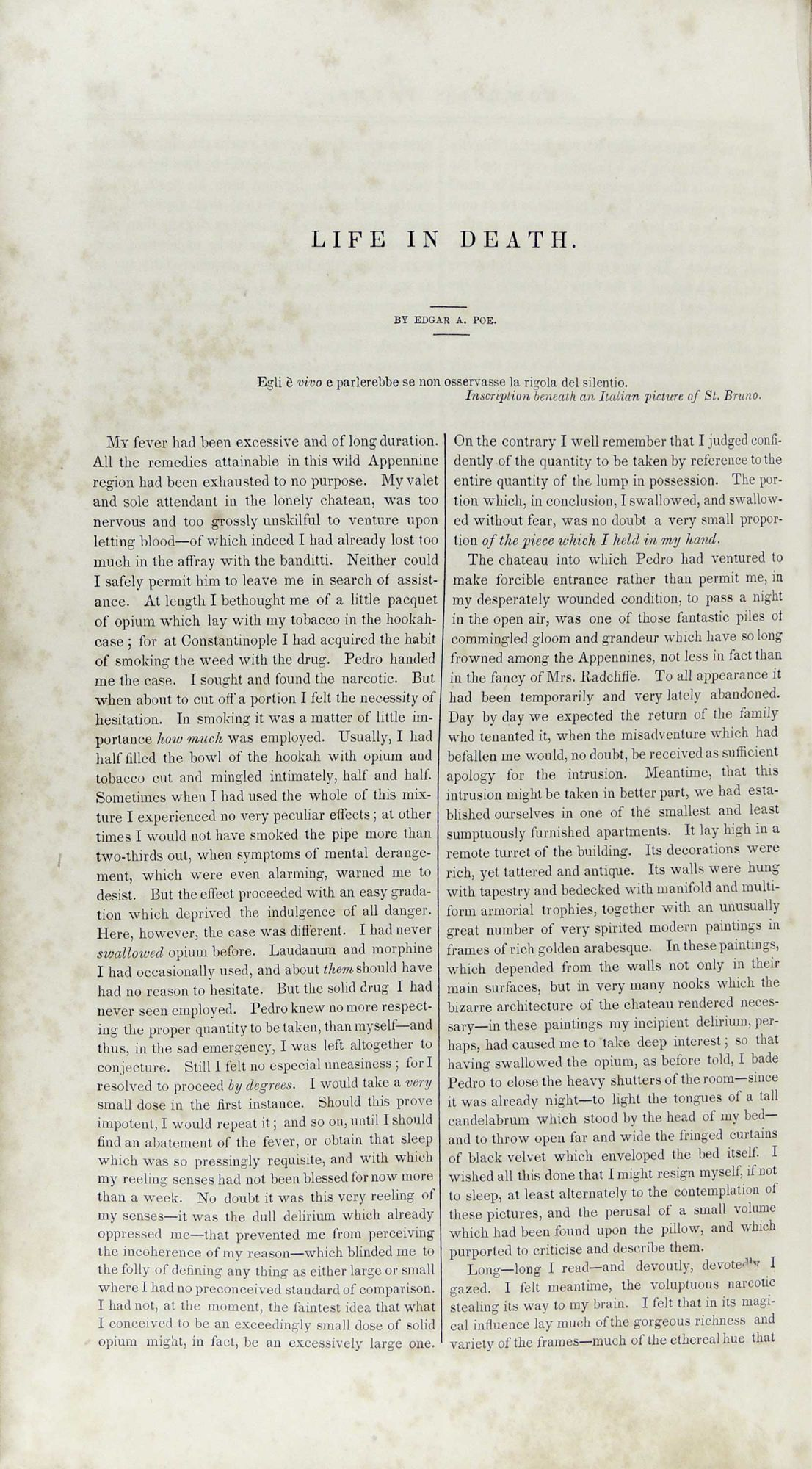
"The Oval Portrait" was first published under the title "Life in Death" in Graham's Magazine, April 1842.

"The Oval Portrait" was first published as a longer version titled "Life in Death" in Graham's Magazine in 1842. "Life in Death" included a few introductory paragraphs explaining how the narrator had been wounded, and that he had eaten opium to relieve the pain. Poe might have excised this introduction because it was not particularly relevant, and it also gave the impression that the story was nothing more than a hallucination. The shorter version, renamed "The Oval Portrait", was published in the April 26, 1845 edition of the Broadway Journal.

== Critical reception and impact ==
The story inspired elements in the 1891 novel The Picture of Dorian Gray by Oscar Wilde. Five years before the novel's publication, Wilde had praised Poe's rhythmical expression. In Wilde's novel, the portrait gradually reveals the evil of its subject rather than that of its artist.

A similar plot is also used in Nathaniel Hawthorne's 1843 tale "The Birth-Mark".

There are similar elements in "The Fall of the House of Usher", such as a painter, his lover/model in a remote setting and especially their obsessions about inanimate objects that are living (the house in "The Fall of the House of Usher" and the painting in "The Oval Portrait"). In 1928, a French film-maker, Jean Epstein, filmed La Chute de la Maison Usher which combined both stories. Artist Richard Corben combined them in his 2012 adaptation after adapting each on their own.

Lance Tait's 2002 play The Oval Portrait is based on Poe's tale. Laura Grace Pattillo wrote in The Edgar Allan Poe Review (2006),

[Tait] takes Poe’s narrative and intriguingly transforms it into a dialogue between the Model and the Portrait. The mood of the piece is a bit different from the original Poe work, and it is unclear at the end whether the Model will actually die (literally or figuratively) as in Poe's tale but Tait is to be commended for creating dialogue that makes Poe’s tale come alive beyond the narrative limitations of the original prose.
