= Francis Alexander Durivage =

American author

Francis Alexander Durivage (1814–1881) was an American writer.

He was a contributor of poems, humorous articles, short stories, and sketches for magazines, often written under the pen name 'Old Un.' In connection with W. S. Chase he translated Alphonse de Lamartine's History of the Revolution of 1848. At a later date he issued, with George P. Burnham, who wrote under the pseudonym of "Young Un," "Stray Subjects arrested and bound over, being the Fugitive Offspring of the Old Un and the Young Un that have been lying around loose, and are now tied up for Fast Keeping" (Boston, 1848).

He was the author of several plays and was for a time co-editor of Ballou's Pictorial. In addition to the works previously mentioned, he published a "Cyclopaedia of History" (Hartford, 1836), and Life Scenes from the World around Us (Boston, 1853).
