= Gleason's Pictorial Drawing-Room Companion =

American Victorian-era serial

Gleason's Pictorial Drawing-Room Companion was a 19th-century illustrated periodical published in Boston, Massachusetts, from 1851 to 1859. The magazine was founded by Frederick Gleason in 1851. The publication name was changed to Ballou's Pictorial Drawing-Room Companion for 1855, after managing editor Maturin Murray Ballou bought out the interest of Gleason. The first issue as Ballou's was 6 January 1855. The magazine absorbed the Illustrated News of New York in 1853. It ceased publication in 1859.

The Pictorial featured artists such as Winslow Homer, and authors such as Giddings H. Ballou, Susan H. Blaisdell, Alice Carey, Sylvanus Cobb, Jr., Sophronia Currier, Mrs. S. P. Doughty, Francis A. Durivage, Aglaus Forrester, Mrs. H. C. Gardner, Joseph Holt Ingraham, Grace Lee, Mary A. Lowell, Mary L. Meany, Ellen Alice Moriarty, Arthur Morton, Frances P. Pepperell, Mary E. Robinson, M. V. St. Leon, Frederick Ward Saunders, Sue M. Scott, Maurice Silingsby, Frederick Stanhope, Horace B. Staniford, John Thornberry, Winnie Woodfern, and Joseph Wolf.

== Images ==
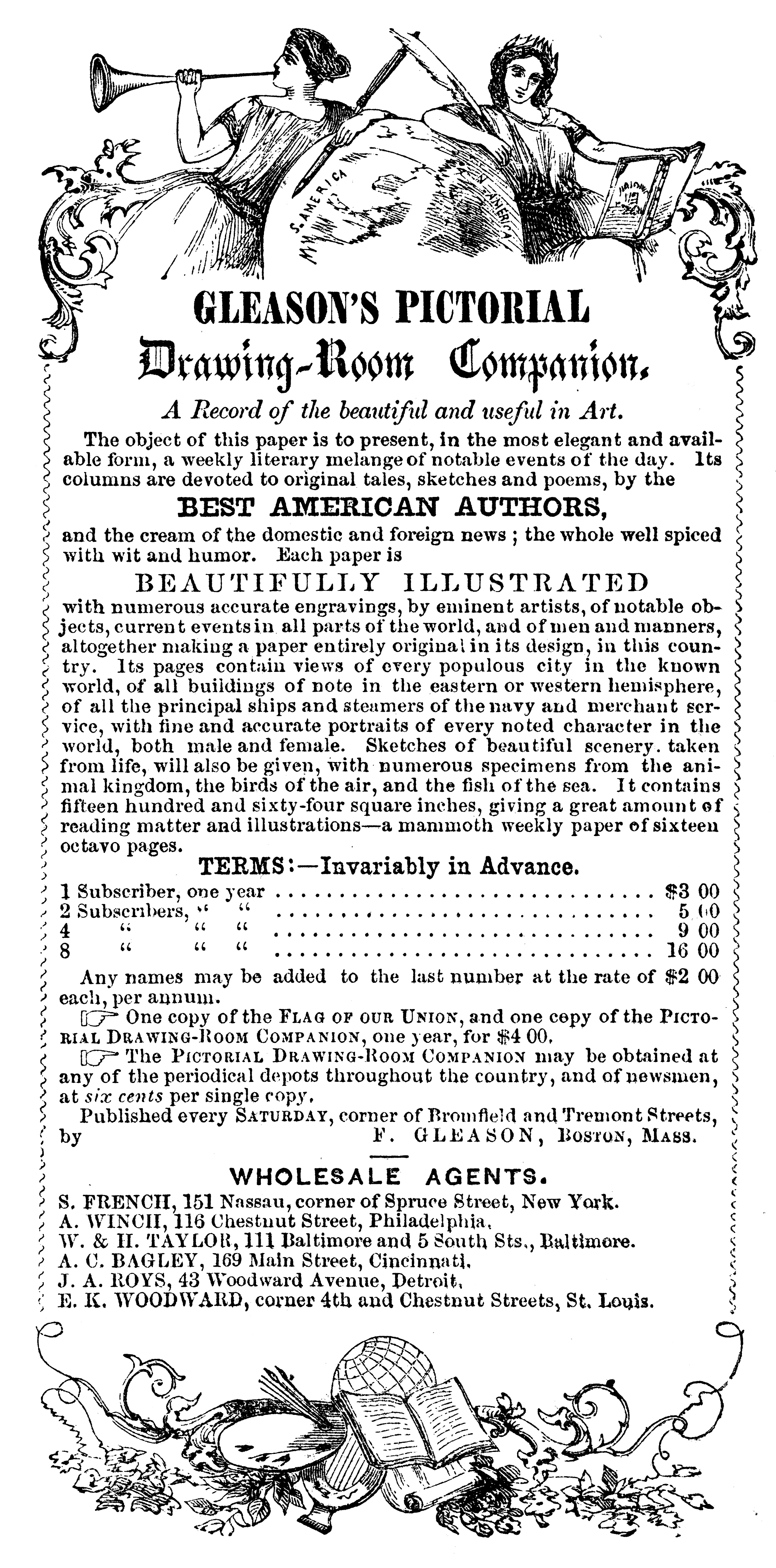

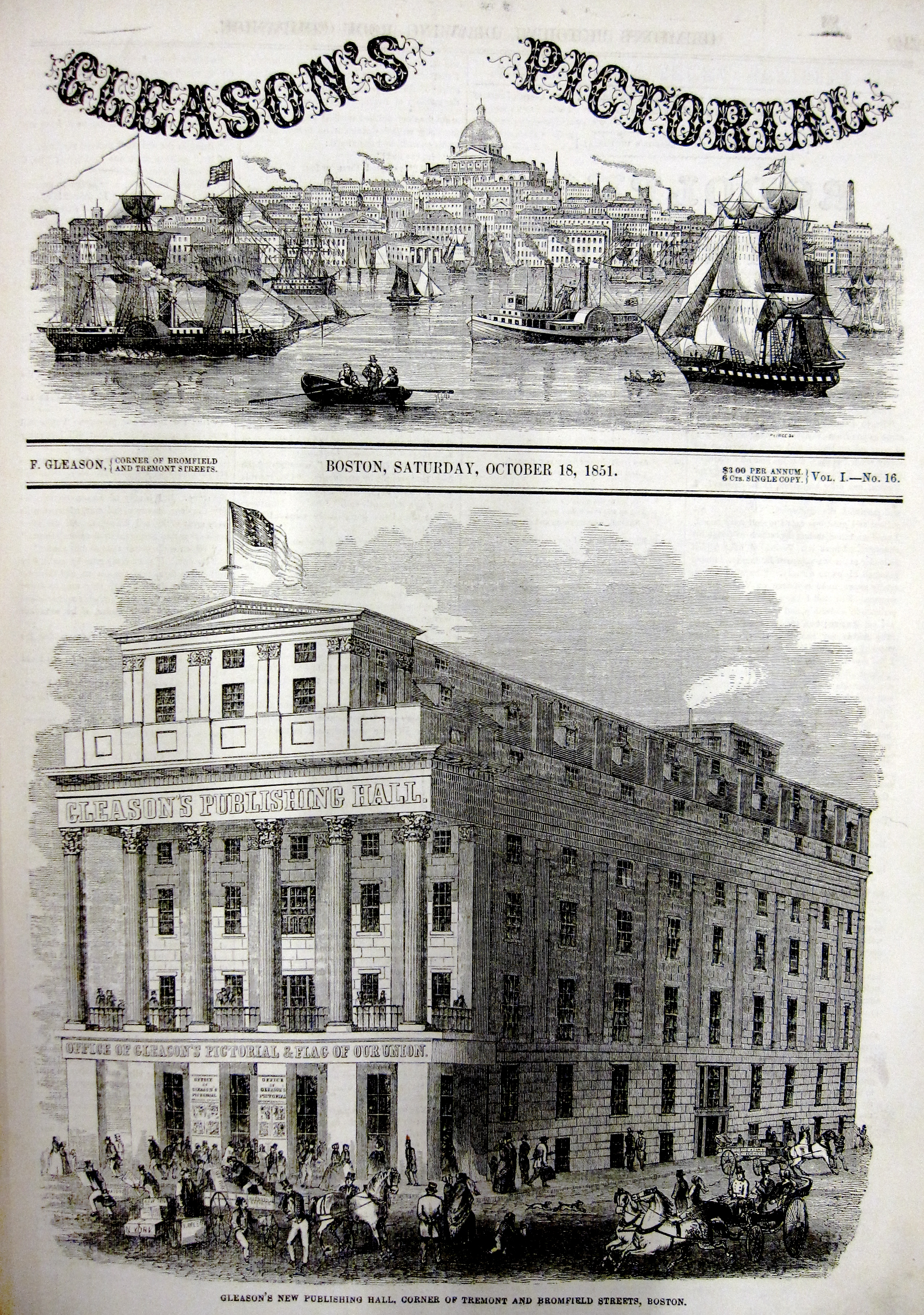
Issue for 18 October 1851, showing Gleason's Publishing Hall, Tremont Street, Boston

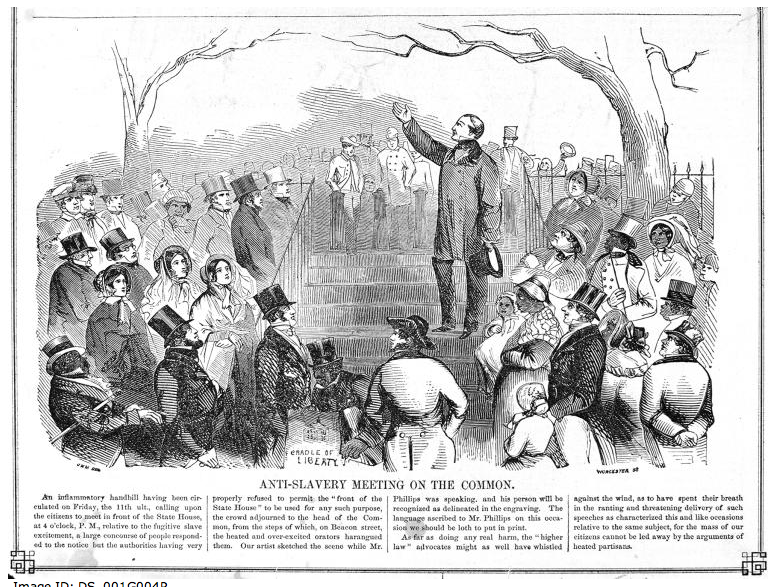
Anti-Slavery meeting on the Boston Common (Gleason's, May 1851)

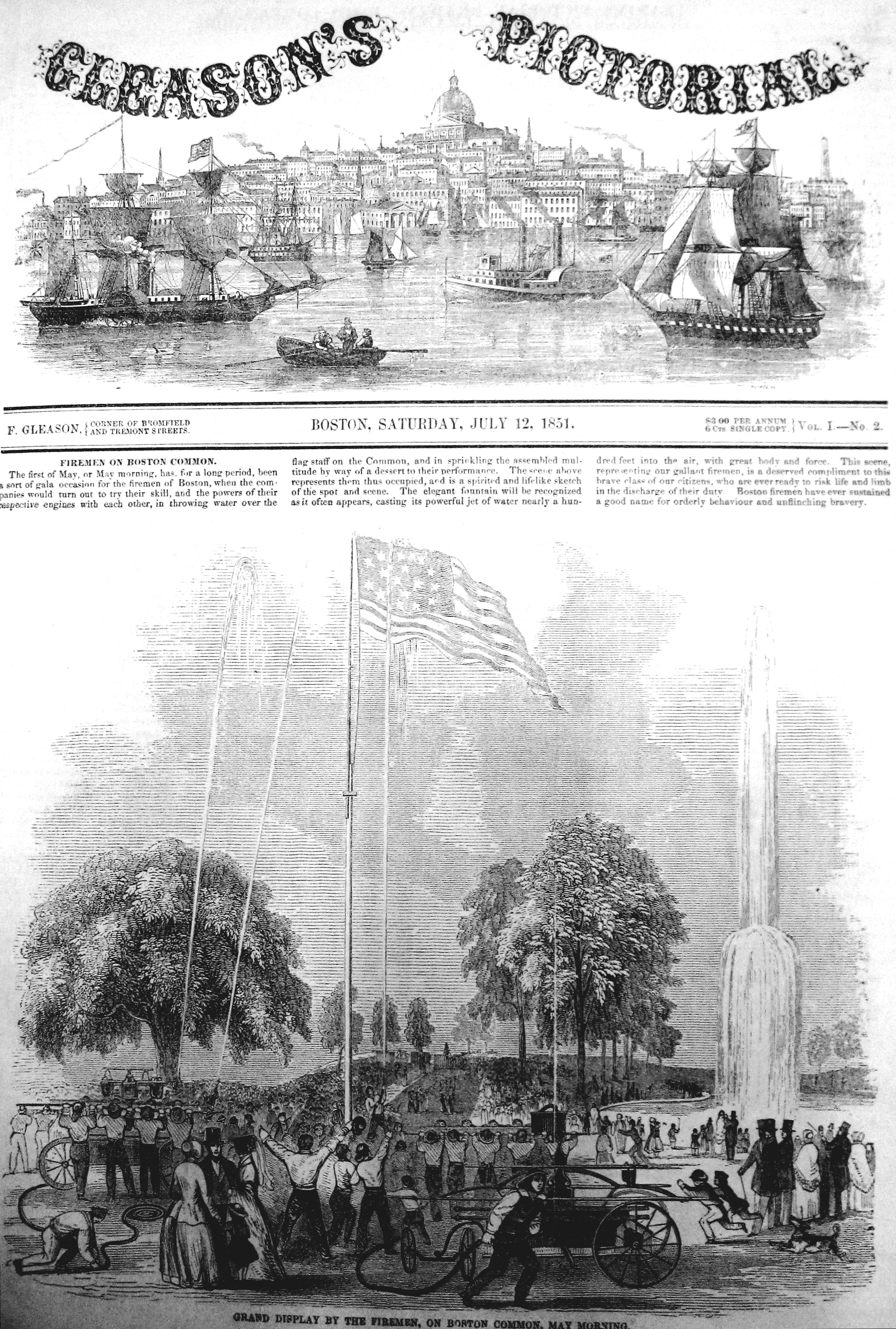
Grand display of firemen, Boston Common, 1851

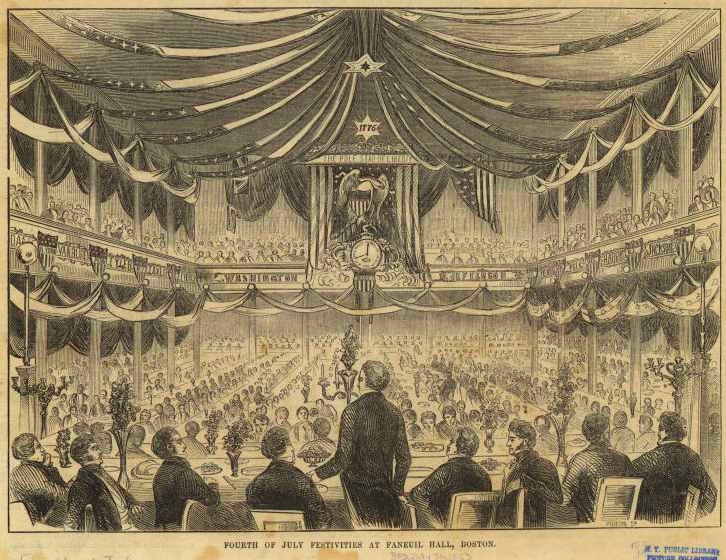
Fourth of July festivities at Faneuil Hall, Boston, 1853

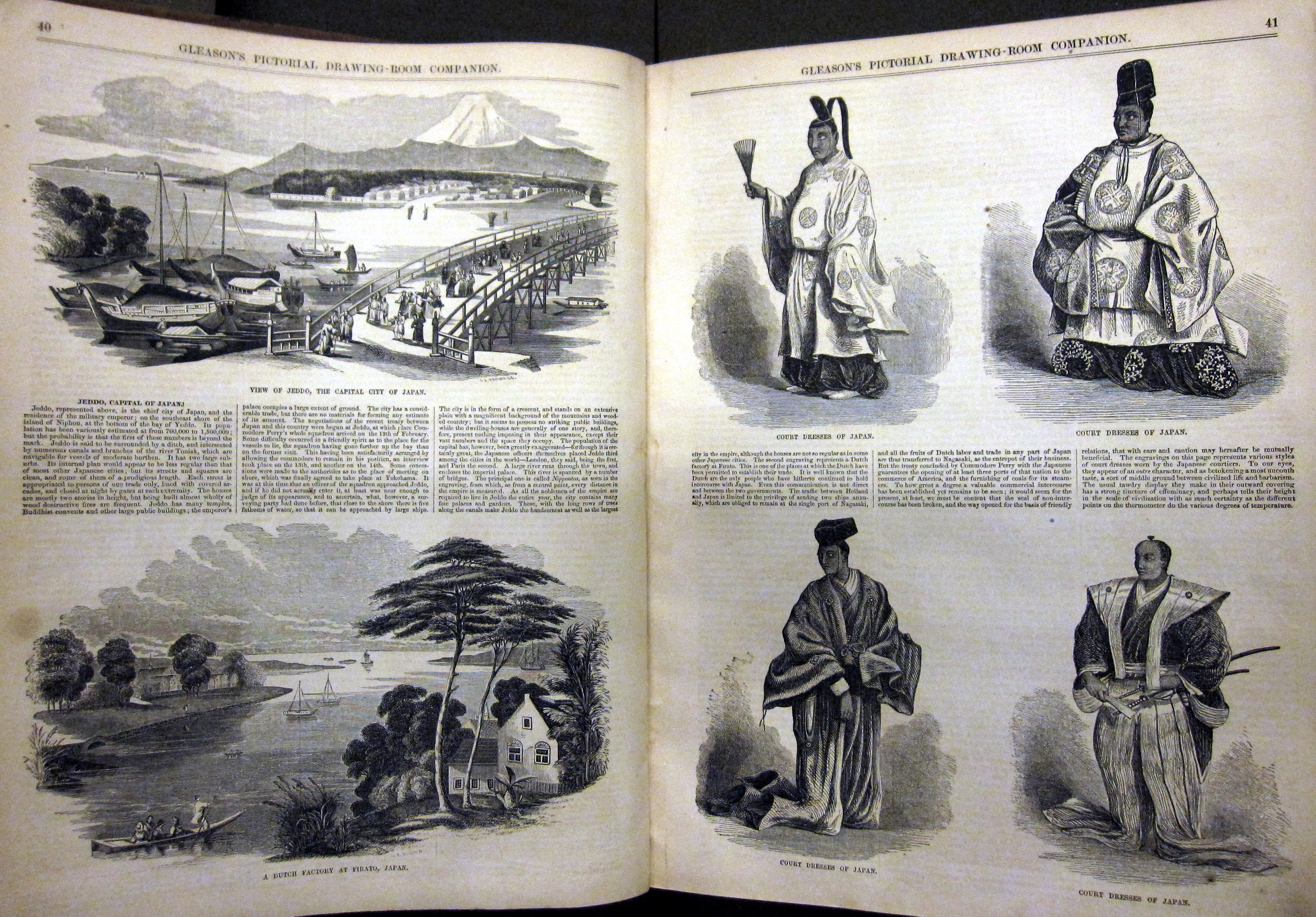
Gleason's, 1854

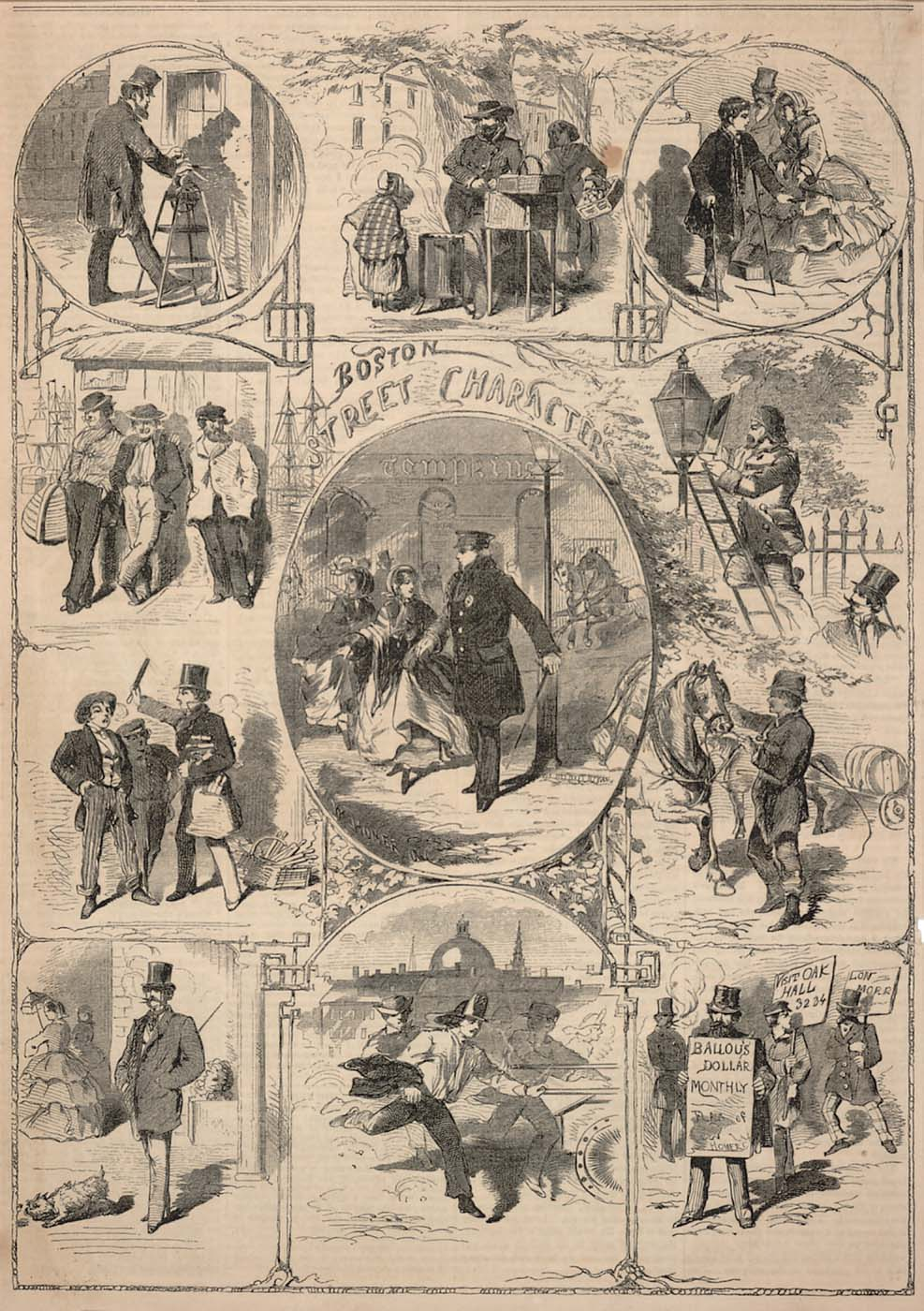
Boston Street Characters, by Winslow Homer (Ballou's, July 9, 1859)

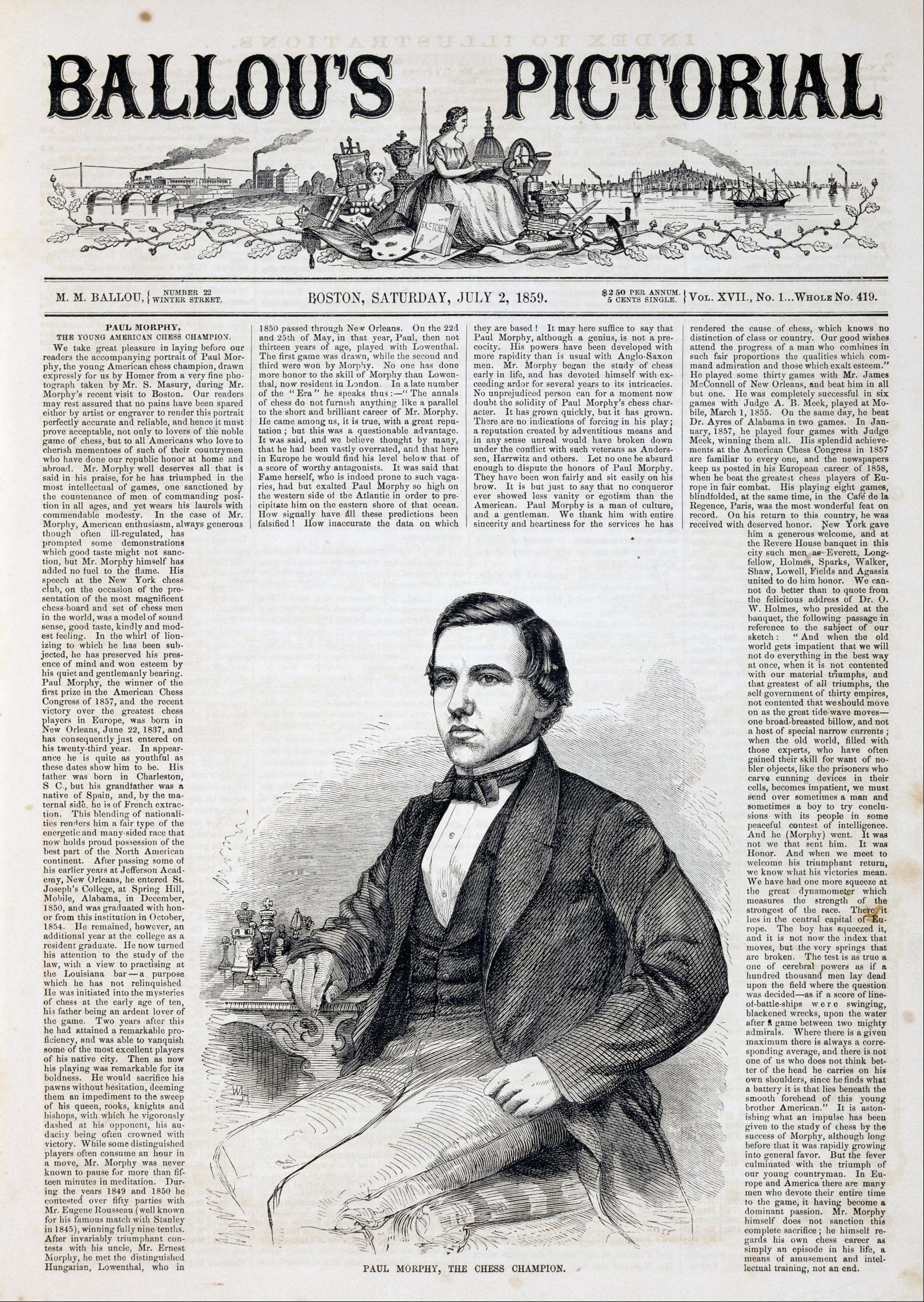
Wood-engraving of Paul Morphy, after Winslow Homer (Ballou's, July 2, 1859)

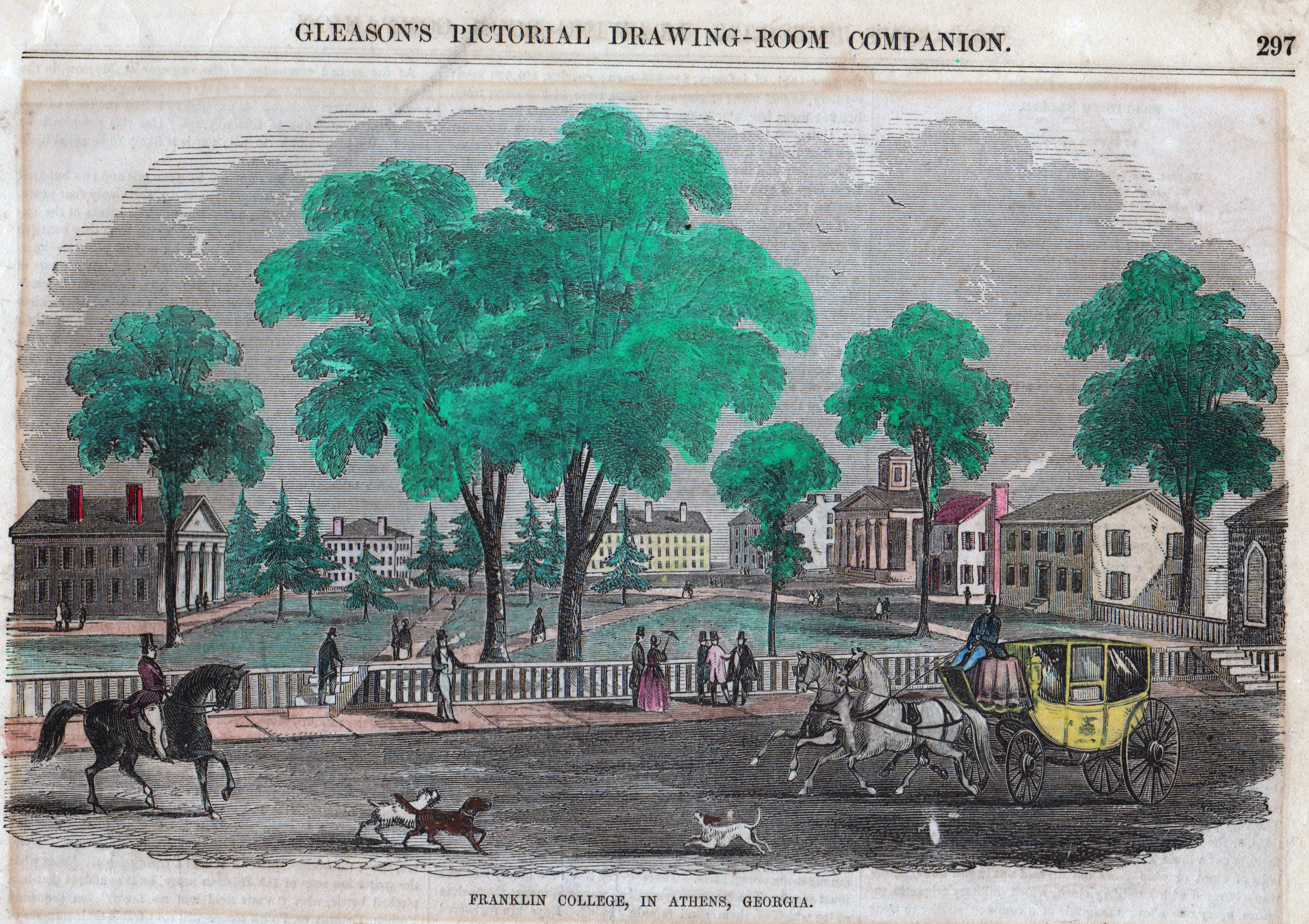
Franklin College in Athens, GA, US
