= Maturin Murray Ballou =

American writer and publisher (1820–1895)

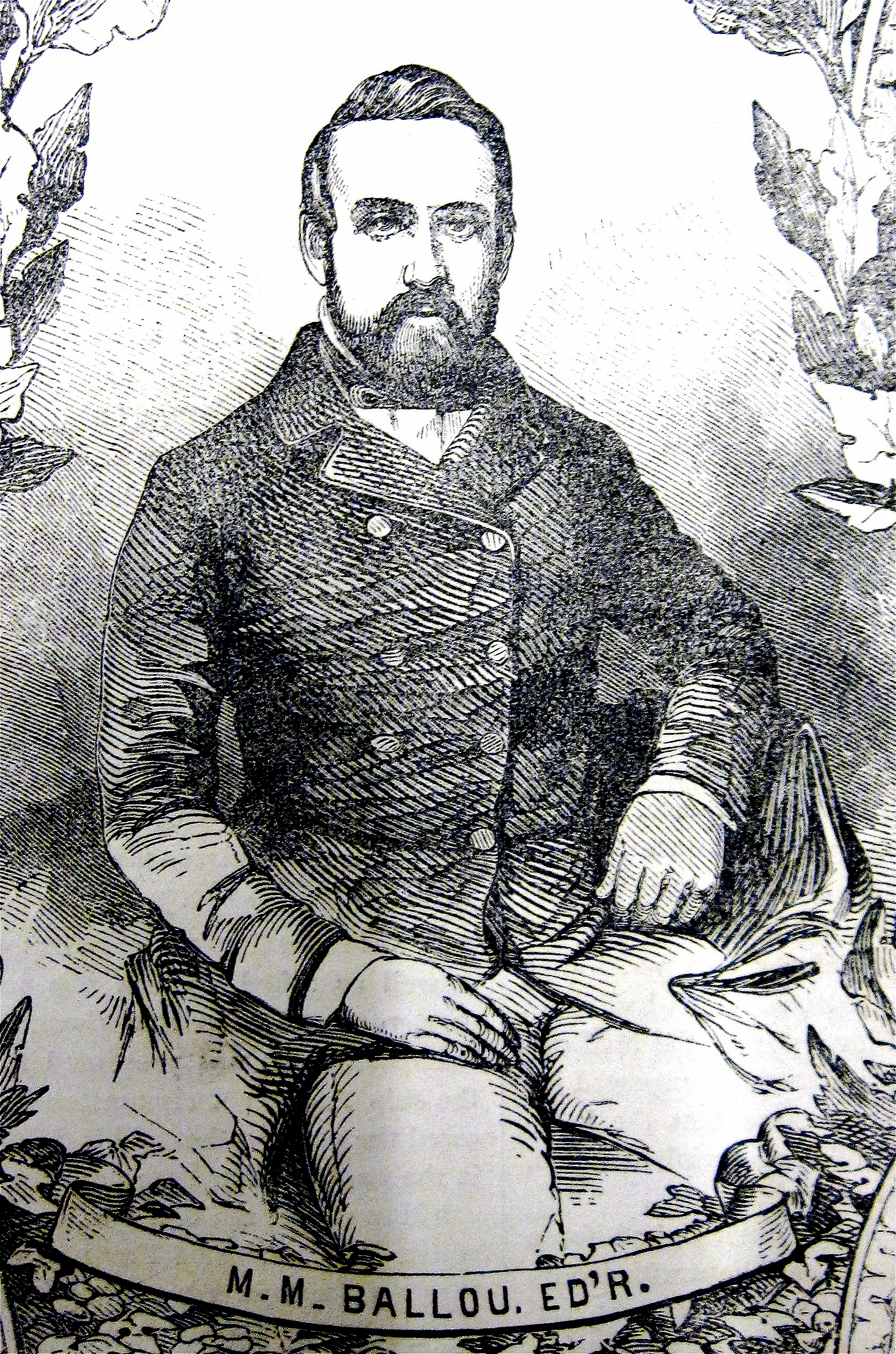
- Portrait of Ballou, 1852
- Born: April 14, 1820; Boston, Massachusetts, U.S.
- Died: March 27, 1895 (aged 74); Cairo, Egypt
- Resting place: Boston
- Education: The English High School
- Occupations: Writer, publisher
- Relatives: Hosea Ballou (father)
- Writing career
- Pen name: Lieutenant Murray

Maturin Murray Ballou (April 14, 1820 – March 27, 1895) was an American writer and publisher in 19th-century Boston, Massachusetts. He co-founded Gleason's Pictorial, was the first editor of the Boston Daily Globe, and wrote numerous travel books and works of popular fiction.

== Brief biography ==
=== 1820s–1840s ===
Ballou was born in Boston in 1820, to parents Hosea Ballou and Ruth Washburn. He attended The English High School, and although he passed the entrance exam for Harvard College, he did not attend. He married Mary Anne Roberts on September 15, 1839; children included Murray Roberts Ballou (b. 1840).

Starting around 1838, Ballou wrote for the Olive Branch, a weekly paper published in Boston. In addition to writing, he worked various jobs for the Boston Post Office, 1839 and the Boston Custom House, ca. 1845. From 1842 through 1844, Ballou and Isaac H. Wright published the weekly newspaper Bay State Democrat. Writing under the pseudonym Lieutenant Murray, Ballou authored popular novels which were published by Frederick Gleason starting around 1845, such as The Gipsey, or, the Robbers of Naples: a Story of Love and Pride. He also wrote stories for The Flag of Our Union.

=== 1850s ===
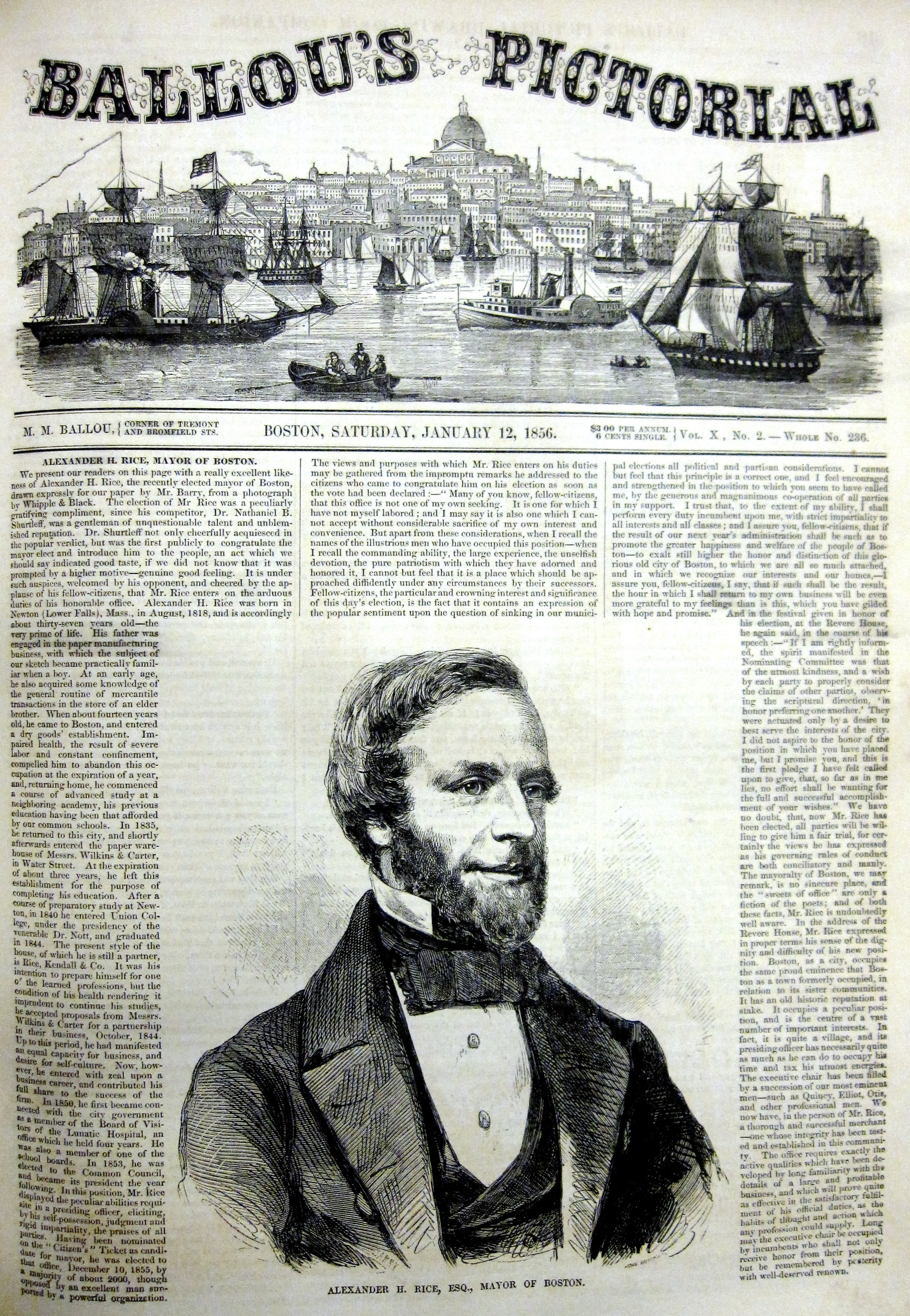
Ballou's Pictorial, January 12, 1856

In 1851, Ballou and Frederick Gleason established the weekly paper Gleason's Pictorial Drawing-Room Companion. It was inspired by The Illustrated London News. The first issue appeared on May 3, 1851, and declared: "The object of this paper is to present, in the most elegant and available form, a weekly literary melange of notable events of the day. Its columns are devoted to original tales, sketches, and poems, by the best American authors, and the cream of the domestic and foreign news; the whole well spiced with wit and humor." In November 1854, Ballou bought out Gleason and changed the paper's name to Ballou's Pictorial Drawing-Room Companion.

Around 1857 Ballou's publishing enterprise in Boston operated from 22 Winter Street, in a building constructed in 1856.

...The building housed on its first two main floors the editorial and business offices of the publisher Maturin Murray Ballou. The basement held the 12 steam-powered presses that each week brought forth, among other publications, more than 100,000 copies of a 16-page, profusely illustrated journal, Ballou's Pictorial Drawing-Room Companion. Engravers occupied the 3rd floor, working at desks by the windows. Atop the building's 4 storeys rose an attic crowned with a large light-admitting lantern. This lantern illuminated the room that Ballou had provided for the graphic artists who contributed to his Companion.

Illustrators who worked for Ballou included John Andrew, Charles A. Barry, W.L. Champney, John Chapin, William Croome, Charles Damoreau, George Devereux, Winslow Homer, Frank Leslie, John Manning, Emile Masson, Samuel Worcester Rowse, William Wade, Alfred Waud, William Waud.

By 1859, M.M. Ballou published several additional periodicals:

- The Flag of Our Union.
- The Weekly Novelette. Some were written by Ballou, under his "Lieutenant Murray" pseudonym: Novelette no. 90 – The scarlet flag; or, The Caribbean rover: a story of the early Buccaneers; Novelette no. 137 – The pirate smugglers; or, The last cruise of the Viper.
- Ballou's Dollar Monthly ("the cheapest magazine in the world"), which continued until June 1893, under varying titles: Dollar Monthly (1863–1865) and Ballou's Monthly Magazine (1866–1893).

=== 1860s–1890s ===
In 1867, Ballou built the St. James Hotel, on Franklin Square in Boston. The hotel had 400 rooms, and was "the largest family hotel in the city, and one of the most expensively furnished."

He served as the first editor of the Boston Daily Globe, from 1872 to 1873. Contemporary reviews were positive:

Boston has another daily newspaper, to add to the 8 or 10 already published here. The Boston Daily Globe comes into being full-armed, like Minerva from the head of Jove; a large 8-page paper, having more of the cast of countenance belonging to the Times or the Tribune than any of its Boston relatives. It claims to be neutral in politics. ... This is a new departure in journalism.

In the 1880s and 1890s he authored several travel books, covering Alaska, Russia, Cuba, India, South America, Australia, Tasmania, New Zealand, Samoa, and elsewhere. In 1882 he "circumnavigated the globe."

In 1885–1886, he was a proprietor of the Boston Athenaeum.

Ballou died on March 27, 1895, in Cairo, Egypt, where he had been with his wife since January 1895. He is buried in Boston.

== Selected works ==
=== Non-fiction ===
- Biography of Rev. Hosea Ballou. Boston: A. Tompkins, 1852.
- Life story of Hosea Ballou: for the young. Boston: Tompkins, 1854.
- Treasury of thought. forming an encyclopædia of quotations from ancient and modern authors. Boston, J.R. Osgood and Co., 1872.
- Pearls of thought. Boston: Houghton, Mifflin & Company, 1881.
- Notable thoughts about women: a literary mosaic. Boston: Houghton, Mifflin and Company, 1882.
- Edge-tools of speech. Boston, Ticknor and Co., 1886.
- Genius in sunshine and shadow. Boston, Ticknor and Co., 1887.

=== Travel ===
- Will Cuba come into the Union? History of Cuba; or, notes of a traveller in the tropics.: Being a political, historical, and statistical account of the island, from its first discovery, to the present time. Boston, Mass.: Published by Phillips, Sampson & Co., 1854.
- History of Cuba, or, Notes of a traveller in the tropics being a political, historical, and statistical account of the island, from its first discovery to the present time. Boston: New York: Phillips, Sampson and Company, 1854.
- Maturin Murray Ballou (1885), Due South; or, Cuba past and present, Boston: Houghton, Mifflin, OL 7080523M
- Due West; or, Round the world in ten months. Boston, Houghton Mifflin, 1886.
  - Maturin Murray Ballou (1888), Due West; or, Round the world in ten months (6th ed.), Boston: Houghton, Mifflin and Company, OL 7129523M
- Maturin Murray Ballou (1887), Due North; or, Glimpses of Scandinavia and Russia, Boston: Ticknor and Company, OL 7241547M
- Foot-prints of travel, or, Journeyings in many lands. Boston: Ginn, 1888.
- Maturin Murray Ballou (1888), Under the Southern Cross, or, Travels in Australia, Tasmania, New Zealand, Samoa, and other Pacific islands, Boston: Ticknor and Co., OL 23352960M
- Maturin Murray Ballou (1890), Aztec Land, Boston, New York: Houghton, Mifflin, OCLC 511725, OL 23279865M
- Maturin Murray Ballou (1892), Equatorial America, descriptive of a visit to St. Thomas, Martinique, Barbadoes, and the principal capitals of South America, Boston: Houghton Mifflin, OCLC 1709763, OL 6908684M
- The Story of Malta. Boston and New York, Houghton, Mifflin and Co., 1893.
- Maturin Murray Ballou (1894), The Pearl of India, Boston: Houghton, Mifflin and Company, OCLC 2044079, OL 7047232M. (About Ceylon)
- Maturin Murray Ballou (1896), Ballou's Alaska, Boston: Houghton, Mifflin, OL 13520174M

=== Fiction ===
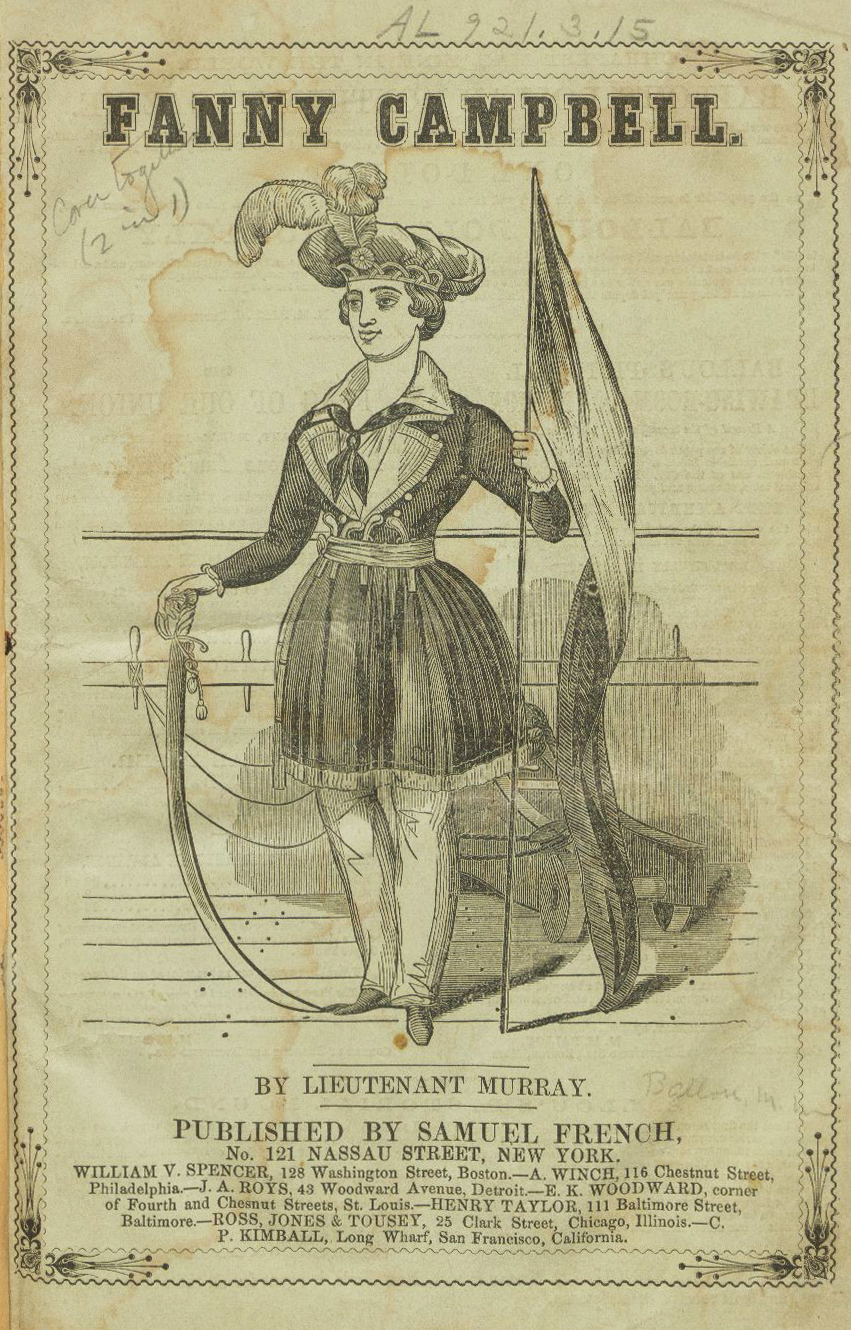
Fanny Campbell, 1844

- Fanny Campbell, the Female Pirate Captain. Boston, F. Gleason, 1844.
- Ben Bobstay, the Boatswain's Mate, and Rosetta of Boston. Boston, John B. Hall, 1845.
- The Naval Officer, or, The pirate's cave. Boston, F. Gleason, 1845.
- The Protege of the Grand Duke: A Tale of Italy. Boston, F. Gleason, 1845.
- Red Rupert, the American Bucanier. Boston, Gleason's Publishing Hall, 1845.
- Albert Simmons; or, The Midshipmen's Revenge. Boston, F. Gleason, 1845.
- The Child of the Sea; or, The Smuggler of Colonial Times. And The Love Test. Boston, United States Publishing Company, 1846.
- The Gipsey; or, The robbers of Naples: a story of love and pride. Boston, F. Gleason, 1847.
- Roderick the Rover; or, The Spirit of the Wave. Boston, Gleason's Publishing Hall, 1847.
- The Spanish Musketeer. Boston, Gleason's Publishing Hall, 1847.
- The Adventurer; or, The Wreck on the Indian Ocean ... Boston, F. Gleason, 1848.
- Rosalette; or, The Flower Girl of Paris. Boston, F. Gleason, 1848.
- The Belle of Madrid; or, The Unknown Mask. Boston, F. Gleason, 1849.
- The Cabin Boy; or, Life on the Wing. Boston, F. Gleason, (1848).
- The Sea-witch Or, the African Quadroon: A Story of the Slave Coast.
- The Magician of Naples; or, Love and Necromancy. New York, Samuel French, [1850?]
- The Turkish Slave; or, The Mahometan and His Harem. Boston, F. Gleason, 1850.
- The Circassian Slave; or, The Sultan's Favorite: A Story of Constantinople and the Caucasus. Boston : F. Gleason, 1851.

=== Drama ===
- Miralda; or, The Justice of Tacon. Boston: W.V. Spencer, 1858.

| Preceded by Newspaper founded | Editor of The Boston Globe; 1872–1873 | Succeeded by Edwin M. Bacon |
