= The Flag of Our Union =

Former newspaper

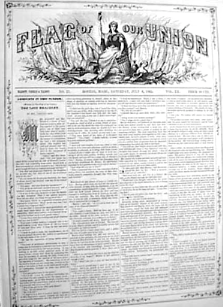
Flag of Our Union, 1865

The Flag of Our Union (est.1846) was a weekly story paper published in Boston, Massachusetts, in the mid-19th century. In addition to news it featured works of fiction and poetry including contributions from notable writers such as Louisa May Alcott and Edgar Allan Poe. Publisher Frederick Gleason began The Flag in 1846, a "miscellaneous family journal, containing news, wit, humor, and romance -- independent of party or sect." Original stories, verse, and illustration appeared in the paper, as well as brief news items on local, national and international current events. Maturin Murray Ballou served as editor. In 1849, Gleason's office was located "on the corner of Court and Tremont Streets" in Boston.

The Flag became quite popular. By some accounts it had "the largest circulation of any papers in the United States," ca.1851. Around 1852, circulation reached 75,000, and shortly grew to 100,000. Story contributors in the paper's early years included Ballou, Henry Ames Blood, Sylvanus Cobb Jr., Joseph Holt Ingraham, and Edgar Allan Poe, Authors' work frequently appeared pseudonymously, such as that of Mary Bassett Clarke, who wrote using the pen name "Ida Fairfield". Pictorial engravings were original: "the reader will please remember that all illustrations that appear in Flag are originally designed and engraved for this paper, nor will any second hand cuts ever be found in its columns."

Editor Ballou later became the paper's publisher after buying it from Gleason in 1854. Over the years, publishers included Gleason (1846–1854), Ballou (1854–1863), James R. Elliott (1863–1870), William Henry Thomes (1863–1871), and Newton Talbot (1863–1871) -- the latter as firms Elliott, Thomes & Talbot, and Thomes & Talbot. Contributors in later years included some particularly noteworthy authors. Sarah Orne Jewett published her first story, "Jenny Garrow's Lovers", in 1868. Louisa May Alcott published work under a pen-name; she also wrote a manuscript for The Flag entitled A Long Fatal Love Chase, but not published until 1995. Alcott describes a fictionalized Flag (i.e. The Blarneystone Banner and The Weekly Volcano ) in Little Women (1868).
