= Frederick Gleason =

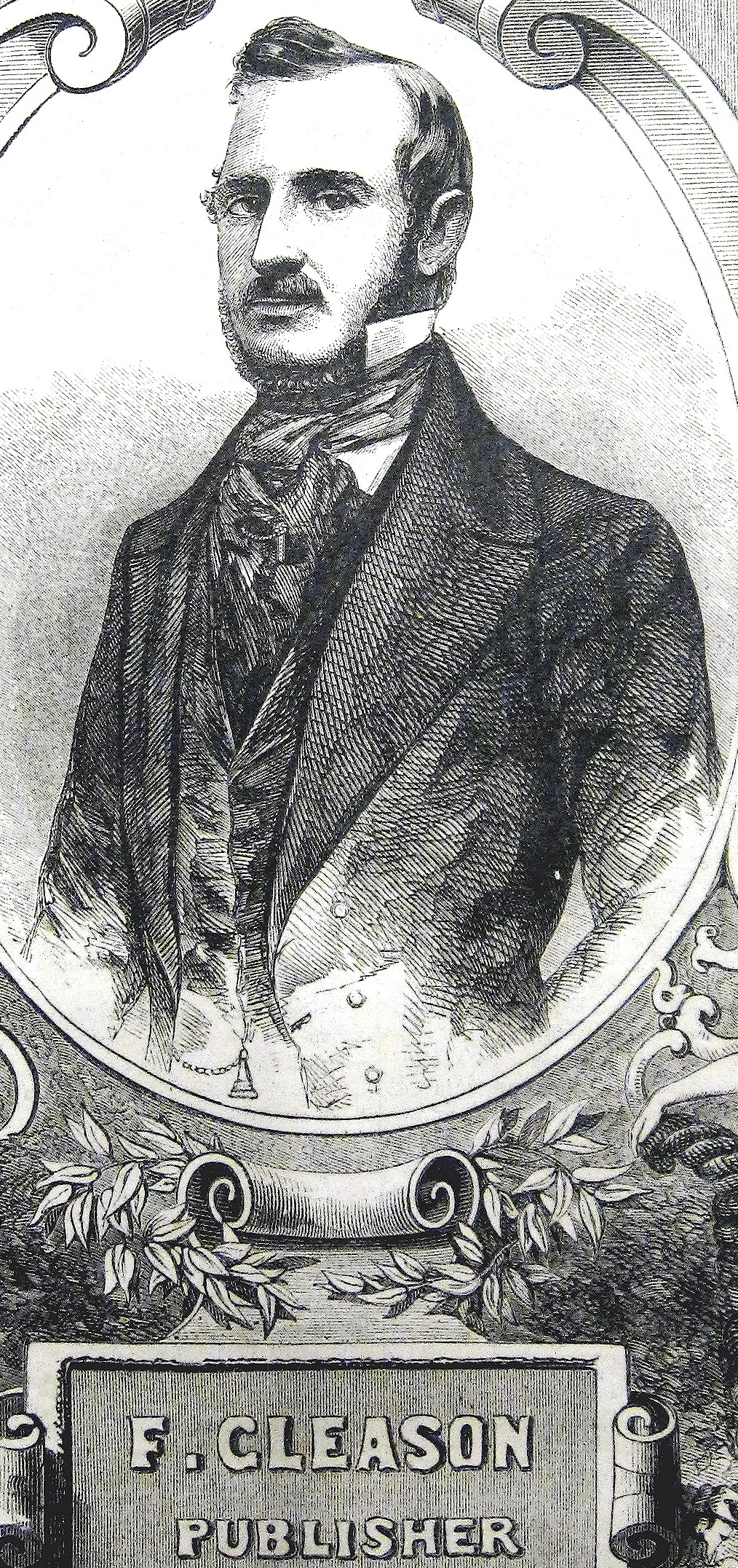
Portrait of Frederick Gleason, wood-engraving, 1852.

Frederick Gleason (c.1817 – November 6, 1896) was a German publisher in Boston, Massachusetts, in the mid-nineteenth century. He is best known for establishing the popular illustrated weekly Gleason's Pictorial, at the time an innovation in American publishing. He has been called "the father of illustrated journalism."

== Biography ==
Born in Germany, Gleason moved to the United States in his youth. He began his career as a bookbinder, working from a second-floor office on Tremont Street in Boston. In the late 1840s Gleason published a string of short novels written by his "stable of hack authors" including Benjamin Barker and Maturin Murray Ballou, often published pseudonymously. Representative are works by the pseudonymous Harry Halyard, including The Doom of the Dolphin and Wharton the Whale-Killer! Each novel ran "exactly 100 pages long and reflect[ed] the emphasis on glib dialogue and fast-paced action characteristic of the emerging 'dime novel' tradition."

Gleason began publishing a weekly story paper, The Flag of Our Union, in 1846. It became popular (75,000 copies circulated) and lucrative for Gleason ("an income of $25,000 a year") His expanding publishing enterprise operated out of a series of offices through the years; for some time Gleason's Publishing Hall was located on Tremont Street, in the former Boston Museum building.

In the 1840s Gleason built "Belvidere," a summer home on Bluehill Avenue in West Roxbury, Massachusetts, near Franklin Park; the house was "an elegant mansion ... landscaped with serpentine drives, fountains, and stands of mature trees." Pictures of the house appeared in Gleason's Pictorial, along with description:

Its great charm is the delightful and extended prospect it affords of the entire harbor of Boston, and the surrounding plain and hills for many miles in extent. The grounds immediately belonging to the house are some three acres in extent, and are improved to the best advantage by a thrifty growth of every species of rich and valuable tree ... the house is situated on the Dorchester and Roxbury lines and is about four miles from the City of Boston.

Gleason entertained frequently at the house. (By 1906, the building had been replaced by the Franklin Park Refectory). In 1848, Gleason and his wife travelled abroad to London, Berlin and Paris. He returned to the US "full of new ideas."

In 1851, Gleason and Ballou established the weekly paper Gleason's Pictorial Drawing-Room Companion, modelled on the Illustrated London News. Gleason's Pictorial "won instant success and proved very profitable." Gleason sold his share of the Pictorial to Ballou in November 1854, "declaring that he had 'realized an ample competency' and now wished to 'retire from business altogether.'" Ballou then changed the paper's title to Ballou's Pictorial Drawing-Room Companion.

The success of Gleason's Pictorial inspired others; imitators quickly became rivals in the publishing field. An item in The New York Daily Times in 1852 emphasizes the growing competition between publishers of pictorials:

Mr. Gleason of the Pictorial. What can Beach and Barnum do against him, who has got all his artists to come together and give him some articles of plate shining resplendently on the banqet of a multiplied newspaper paragraph? the artists declare that Mr. G is a Pericles in his patronage of the arts; and that gentleman certainly patronizes as many arts as Pericles -- perhaps more. But the artists are right. They will find reversed the meaning of the old saying that whenever the kings rage against one another, the people under them have cause to weep. In the coming literary contention, the men of the graver will only grow the jollier.

After the Pictorial, Gleason published Gleason's Literary Companion 1860–70; Gleason's Home Circle 1871–90; and Gleason's Monthly Companion 1872–87. He retired in 1890. Financially, Gleason's net worth fluctuated over the years. In the 1850s he earned high profits but publishing rivals thereafter diminished his profit share. In terms of other investments, starting around 1857, Gleason "got into Wall Street, made $50,000 one week, lost $300,000 the next, and at the time of the crisis found his liabilities amounting to $2 million, with only $500,000 to meet them."
