= Dracula's Guest and Other Weird Stories =

1914 book by Bram Stoker

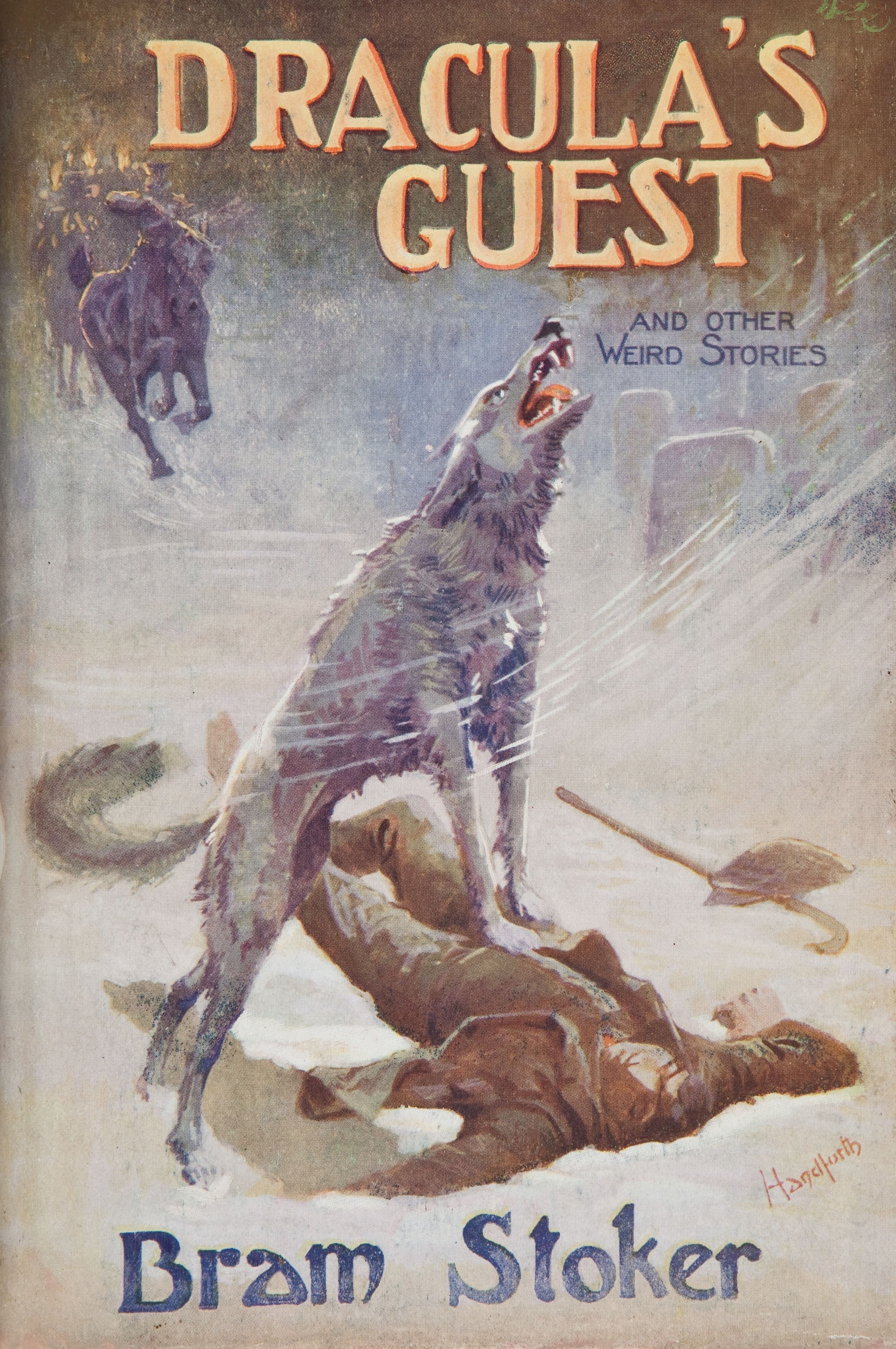
- Front cover of the first edition
- Author: Bram Stoker
- Cover artist: William Bradshaw Handforth
- Genre: Short stories, horror fiction
- Publisher: George Routledge and Sons
- Publication date: 1914
- Publication place: United Kingdom
- Media type: Print (hardcover)
- Pages: 200
- OCLC: 3952965
- LC Class: PZ3.S8743 Dr14 PR6037.T617 (Arrow Books, 1974)

Dracula's Guest and Other Weird Stories is a collection of short stories by Bram Stoker, first published in 1914 in London, two years after Stoker's death, at the behest of his widow Florence Balcombe. She wrote the preface to the collection in which she described the title story as an excised or deleted chapter from the novel Dracula. The remaining stories were previously published.

The color illustration for the book cover was by British illustrator William Bradshaw Brandforth, depicting a scene from the short story. The English guest is shown prostrate on the snow as a large wolf stands over him howling. In the background can be seen a horse and coach approaching. White tombstones can also be seen in the cemetery along with the guest's cane as snow swirls all around.

The same collection has been issued under short titles including simply Dracula's Guest. Meanwhile, collections published under longer titles contain different selections of stories.

The first U.S. edition was published in 1937 in New York by Hillman-Curl under the title Dracula's Guest.

== Contents of the collection ==
Title	Date of first publication	Location of first publication
"Dracula's Guest"	1914	Dracula's Guest and Other Weird Stories
"The Judge's House"	5 December 1891	Holly Leaves: The Christmas Number of The Illustrated Sporting and Dramatic News
"The Squaw"	2 December 1893	Holly Leaves: The Christmas Number of The Illustrated Sporting and Dramatic News
"The Secret of the Growing Gold"	23 January 1892	Black & White: A Weekly Illustrated Record and Review
"A Gipsy Prophecy"	26 December 1885	The Spirit of the Times
"The Coming of Abel Behenna"	26 March 1893, 2 April 1893	Lloyd's Weekly Newspaper
"The Burial of the Rats"	26 January 1896, 2 February 1896	Lloyd's Weekly Newspaper, Boston Herald
"A Dream of Red Hands"	11 July 1894	The Sketch: A Journal of Art and Actuality
"Crooken Sands"	1 December 1894	Holly Leaves: The Christmas Number of The Illustrated Sporting and Dramatic News

== Stories ==
=== "Dracula's Guest" ===
"Dracula's Guest" was originally intended as the opening chapter of Dracula, it features an unnamed English traveler in Munich on Walpurgis Night, who ignores warnings not to visit a deserted village of corpses and vampires. He walks off alone to the deserted village and stumbles into a cemetery and the tomb of Countess Dolingen. He reads on her tomb inscribed in Russian on the marble: "The dead travel fast." Trapped in the snow storm, he sees the body of the Countess. He loses consciousness, awaking to find a large wolf on his chest. He is rescued by soldiers from the town. Dracula had sent a note to the innkeeper to safeguard the traveler.

=== "The Judge's House" ===
"The Judge's House" is about a student named Malcolm Malcolmson who moves into a secluded and deserted mansion in the town of Benchurch to study for his exams. He ignores local warnings and superstitions about the house formerly owned by a "hanging judge". The Jacobean mansion is regarded as haunted by supernatural and demonic forces which he dismisses outright. A large rat with hate-filled, gleaming eyes terrorizes and menaces him. He throws books at the rat. Only The Bible is able to strike and drive the rat away, which causes him to pause and ponder the anomaly. This foreshadows Dracula where a crucifix or Christian cross is able to drive away a vampire. The rats are spooked in the house and are constantly gnawing and running around creating havoc. A rope to a bell is the actual rope used to hang criminals by the judge. A painting of the judge is on the wall. His malevolence and hate-filled persona is exhibited in the portrait. The student is shocked to discover that the judge is no longer in the painting. He is seen in the room fashioning a noose to hang the student. He is ultimately able to hang the student with the rope. The painting of the judge shows a change in his appearance. He is shown smiling in triumph at the death of the student. This story prefigures the supernatural horror of Dracula.

=== "The Squaw" ===
In "The Squaw", an English narrator and his wife are on their honeymoon in Nuremberg, Germany, along with an American named Elias P. Hutcheson. They go to see a "Torture Tower" where Hutcheson drops a stone from a battlement which accidentally kills a kitten tended by its mother. The black mother cat is enraged and seeks to attack the party but is unable to reach them. Instead, the cat stalks them seeking revenge. Hutcheson relates a story about a Cherokee mother that he killed in the American West. The two stories mirror each other. The Native American mother, for whom the American uses the derogatory term "the squaw", similarly sought revenge for her killed child. She tortured to death the man who killed her child. Hutcherson likens this case to that of the cat. When they reach the torture chamber, Hutcheson goes inside the Iron Maiden to test it. The mother cat, carefully watching him, makes the custodian release the mechanism. The spiked door slams shut, killing Hutcheson instantly. The cat is seen sitting on the corpse, licking the blood.

=== "The Secret of the Growing Gold" ===
This is an 1892 tale of supernatural vengeance, avarice, and murder. Geoffrey Brent murders Margaret Delandre, buries her, and then marries. He is plagued by guilt for her murder. She visits him in an apparition. Her luxuriant golden hair grows from her shallow grave. Her hair of gold then fills his room. It grows in the crevices and through the floorboards. Eventually Geoffrey and his wife are entangled by the growing golden hair and are found dead in their room.

=== "A Gipsy Prophecy" ===
Originally published in 1885 in the U.S. newspaper The Spirit of the Times, the story is about Joshua Considine who visits a gipsy camp where he is told by a fortune teller that by his own hands he will murder his wife. He and his friend, Dr. Burleigh, are told that Joshua's hand is "red with blood" and that he is destined to kill his wife. This prophecy causes panic and apprehension in the couple, who are spooked by it. The story explores the nature of superstitious beliefs and their power to impact our behavior and lives. They both expect the worst to occur. But in a twist ending, the knife severs the ring on the finger in only a symbolic death, the death of the relationship.

=== "The Coming of Abel Behenna" ===
The story is about a love triangle, jealousy, and betrayal in a Cornish fishing town called Pencastle. Both Abel Behenna and Eric Sanson compete to marry Sarah Trefusis. They flip a coin to decide who will marry her. Abel wins but he has to leave the town to earn enough money to marry her. When he returns, he is assured to marry Sarah. But while he is away, Eric persuades her that Abel is dead. With Abel presumed dead, Eric plans to marry Sarah. But Abel returns to town in a storm that wrecks his ship. Eric goes to save him but instead he allows him to fall to his death and drown. Eric is guilt-ridden about his betrayal of his friend Abel. But he and Sarah marry. But after their marriage, the corpse of Abel washes up on the shore with outstretched hand. Sarah and Eric are terrified by the omen. Eric mutters: "Devil’s help! Devil's faith! Devil's price!" The realization of the betrayal turns Eric's face whiter than that of the corpse of Abel.

=== "The Burial of the Rats" ===
An 1896 story about an English traveler in Paris who wanders alone in the rag-picker slums on the outskirts of the city. He befriends an elderly woman at the encampment but cannot trust her because she is carrying a knife by her side. He is spotted by scavengers and swarms of flesh-eating rats who chase him in a flight for survival. He is able to outrun his pursuers. The police are able to apprehend his attackers in the camp. The main suspect is found dead and their body eaten to the bones by the rats. The "rat burial" is a reference to the ravenous rats who eat the flesh of their victims. The story illustrates that beneath the image of civilized and ordered society lies an underworld of corruption and decay which is hidden to view.

=== "A Dream of Red Hands" ===
It is a psychological Gothic tale with elements of the supernatural about Jacob Settle, who experiences recurring nightmares of red, blood-drenched hands. The theme of the tale is guilt and the unescapable influence of conscience. The red, bloody hands symbolize his guilt over accidentally killing those he intended to protect. Guilt leads to remorse, and, finally, to redemption, as Settle's hands in death turn to a white color, symbolizing the expiation of his guilt.

=== "Crooken Sands" ===
An 1894 Gothic, psychological horror story about Arthur Ferlee Markam, a London merchant who goes on a vacation to Scotland where he stays at "the Red House". The setting is the eastern coastal area of Cruden Bay in Aberdeenshire, Scotland. He wears a native Scottish Highland costume which is perceived as a mockery of the historical traditions and customs of the region. He begins to believe that he is being followed by a double, or a doppelgänger, when he ventures out of the town. The area is known for its quicksand which is a danger for tourists. He is told to avoid the quicksand and warned about the dangers there. There is an atmosphere of foreboding as his death is predicted in the sands by a preacher who warns him that he will come face-to-face with himself and then die. He narrowly escapes death in the sands after an encounter with a person he regards as his double. In a twist ending, it is revealed in a letter that his supposed double was actually his business partner's missing relative, Emmanuel Moses Marks, who was wearing the same clothes as Markam.

== Reception ==
The collection went through fourteen printings in twenty years.

Stephen King, in Danse Macabre (1981), praised these "absolutely champion short stories". His conclusion was: "Those who enjoy macabre short fiction could not do better than his collection Dracula's Guest."

== Adaptations ==
- "The Burial of the Rats" was adapted in 1995 as a U.S. TV movie for Showtime called Bram Stoker's Burial of the Rats by Roger Corman's film company and as a comic book by Jerry Prosser and Francisco Solano Lopez. The comic was Bram Stoker's Burial of the Rats, No. 1 (Roger Corman's Cosmic Comics, April 1995 issue.
- "The Squaw" was adapted for comics by Archie Goodwin (script) and Reed Crandall (art) for Creepy magazine no.13.
- "Dracula's Guest" was adapted for comics by E. Nelson Bridwell (script) and Frank Bolle (art) for Eerie magazine no.16.
- On 26 May 1926, a reading of "The Judge's House" appeared on the radio programme Ghost Programme on 2LO.
- On 28 February 1949, an adaptation of "The Judge's House" arranged by John Keir Cross aired on the BBC Light Programme show The Man in Black. It starred Hugh Burden as Malcolm Malcolmson, Howieson Culff as Mr. Carnford, and Gladys Young as Mrs. Dempster.
- On 25 September 1981, a radio drama adaptation of The Judge's House written by Bob Juhren and starring Gordon Gould and Lloyd Battista aired on CBS Radio Mystery Theater.
- In January 1982, a radio play adaptation of "The Judge's House" dramatised by Patricia Mays and directed by Derek Hoddinott aired on the BBC World Service. It starred Nigel Havers as Malcolmson and Jane Thompson as Mrs. Witham.
- On 9 April 1989, an adaptation of "The Judge's House" aired on the Fear on Four programme BBC Radio 4. Dramatised by John Keir Cross, directed by Gerry Jones, and presented by Edward de Souza, it featured David Timson as Malcolm, Tessa Worsley as Mrs. Dempster, and Norman Bird as Carnford.
- In 1999, "The Judge's House" was adapted by Carla Jablonski into a Wishbone story, "No Noose Is Good News", that was published in the short story collection Tails of Terror.
- In 2018, "The Judge's House" was included in an adaptation of The Second Pan Book of Horror Stories by Anita Sullivan for BBC Radio 4 Extra. Directed by Karen Rose, the segment featured Luke Thompson as Malcolmson, Pippa Haywood as Mrs. Witham, and Kathryn Drysdale as Dempster.
- In October 2024, Neu Noir Theatre staged a theatrical adaptation of "The Judge's House" starring Richard Usher.
