= Crooken Sands =

- Short story by Bram Stoker
- "Crooken Sands" was first published in Holly Leaves on 1 December 1894.

Text available at Wikisource
- Country: United Kingdom
- Language: English
- Genre: HorrorMystery+

Publication
- Published in: Holly Leaves, 1 December, 1894, Dracula's Guest and Other Weird Stories (1914)
- Publisher: The Illustrated Sporting and Dramatic News
- Media type: Print
- Publication date: 1 December 1894

"Crooken Sands" is an 1894 mystery and horror short story by Irish author Bram Stoker. It first appeared in the December 1, 1894 issue of the UK Christmas annual Holly Leaves, published by The Illustrated Sporting and Dramatic News.

The satirical tale is about a narcissistic and image-conscious London merchant who rents an estate in Scotland where he seeks to display his faux Scottish identity by ostentatiously wearing full Highland chieftain regalia. The townspeople make a prophecy that his arrogant manner will lead to his doom, the result of an encounter with his own doppelgänger. Based on a prophecy, he is fated to die by drowning in the quick sands known as Crooken Sands. He is haunted by his foretold doom. He recklessly ignores and dismisses the warning, however, and goes to the beach, where he appears to encounter his double, a person who looks just like him.

== Background and themes ==
The setting of the short story, Cruden Bay, was a favorite vacation destination for Bram Stoker, so he was familiar with the landscape and the people of the coastal region. He signed a guest book of the Kilmarnock Arms Hotel in Cruden Bay in 1894 with the inscription:

"Second visit to Port Erroll. Delighted with everything and everyone. Hope to come again to the Kilmarnock Arms"'

Port Erroll was the original name for Cruden Bay village.

The two key thematic elements are mystery and horror. The story centers around Arthur Fernlee Markam, a wealthy and vain Cockney businessman, who takes a summer vacation to Scotland with his family. Unfamiliar with Scottish customs and traditions, he flaunts his custom-made Highland outfit to impress the people of the town, in a display that is perceived as ridiculous and stereotypical. He has a shallow and superficial understanding of the culture and history of the region.

The theme of the supernatural is presented as a curse or prophecy. An eccentric man in the town named Saft Tammie, a prophet of doo, confronts him. He is believed to have supernatural powers in predicting the future Tammie tells Markham that his vanity will cause him to meet himself "face to face". This encounter will result in his death by drowning in the quicksand.

The theme of an apparition or ghost creates horror and mystery. Markam falls into the quicksand but is rescued. This instills fear in him because of the omen. He begins to have a premonition of his own death. He has a fatal vision of a ghostly apparition, the haunting image on the beach one evening of another man. He is terrified by the appearance of another man that looks identical to him, his double, or a doppelganger. He sees him walking on the other side of the quicksand. Is he a supernational double of himself as the prophecy foretold?

The theme of psychological terror or trauma induces a transformation. Markam experiences genuine horror and revulsion at the sight. He begins to question his own judgment and regrets his bravado and haughty persona in rejecting the advice. He then ditches his kilt and Highland clothes into the quicksand. He makes a resolution. He informs his family that he has come to his senses.

The theme of self-deception and self-delusion is presented in the climactic plot twist. He returns to London where two months later he receives a letter from a Scottish outfitter who queries him about seeing a man who looks just like him. The letter explained that the double was a tailor who had drowned in the quicksand. Markam had erroneously convinced himself that he was a supernatural doppelganger.

== Publication history ==
It was first published in the UK in the December 1, 1894 issue of Holly Leaves, the Christmas Number of The Illustrated Sporting and Dramatic News, in London. Two other Stoker short stories were published in the annual, "The Judge's House" in 1891 and "The Squaw" in 1893.

This story was first published in book form in 1914 in Stoker's third collection of short stories Dracula's Guest and Other Weird Stories by George Routledge & Sons, Ltd., in London. In 1973 it appeared in The Bram Stoker Bedside Companion by Victor Gollancz Ltd, in London, and in 1997 in Best Ghost and Horror Stories, by Dover Publications, Inc., in New York.

== Plot summary ==
It is an 1894 Gothic and psychological horror story about Arthur Ferlee Markam, a London merchant who goes on a vacation to Scotland where he stays at "the Red House" above the Mains of Crooken. The setting is the eastern coastal region of Cruden Bay in Aberdeenshire, Scotland.

He wears a native Scottish Highland costume which is perceived as a mockery of the historical traditions and customs of the region. He begins to believe that he is being followed by a double, or a doppelgänger, when he ventures out of the town. The area is known for its quicksand which is a danger for tourists.

He is warned to avoid the quicksand and informed about the dangers there. There is an atmosphere of foreboding and death as his death is predicted in the sands by a preacher who warns him that he will come face-to-face with himself and then die.

He narrowly escapes death in the sands after an encounter with an apparition of person he regards as his double. In a twist ending, it is revealed in a letter that his supposed double was actually his business partner's missing relative, Emmanuel Moses Marks, who was wearing the same clothes as Markam.

All intimation and hints of the supernatural are dispelled as there is a rational explanation or denouement to the mystery. Markam had created the mystery and horror in his own mind, psychologically convincing himself of the reality of what was a spurious and false prophecy.

== Analysis ==
In The Critical Introduction to Bram Stoker, Carol A. Senf analyzed the story along with "A Dream of Red Hands":

“'A Dream of Red Hands' (originally published in July 11, 1894 in the Sketch, Vol. 6) and “Crooken Sands” (published in the December 1, 1894 issue of the Illustrated Sporting and Dramatic News) are moral tales. In the first, a man is beset by bad dreams for a crime he had accidentally committed in his youth. However, he manages to expiate his crime by courageously saving the life of another man. “Crooken Sands” includes a double image and a man who is able to conquer his own pride."

Kate Hebblethwaite wrote that the story had a "rather different tone" from Stoker's other short stories. The "acerbic ridiculing of Celtic sentimentality of 'Crooken Sands' (1894) initially seems at odds with the other, dourer, Gothic tales." But she rejects this criticism of the story. She argued that the "comic lingering over the absurdity of Arthur Markam's tartan costume" does not "set" it "apart" from the others. "Prophecy, nightmares and the recurrent Gothic motif of the doppelganger soon offset the reverence and humour with darker revelations about the ability of the mind to react forcibly to the power of suggestion." "absolution" is the "apogee" of the story. Markam discovers the "fatal force" of his "vanity". Markam learns "what a vain old fool I was". In the plot twist, his supposed double was actually Roderick MacDhu, whose real name was Emmanuel Moses Marks, who drowned in the Crooken Sands.

== Adaptations ==
Audible released an audio recording of the short story in 2021 narrated by Don Hagen. The short story was also narrated by Sam Kusi in the 2024 Audible audiobook Dracula's Guest and Other Weird Stories.

== Sources ==
- Hughes, William. Beyond Dracula: Bram Stoker’s Fiction and Its Cultural Context. Springer, 2000.
- Senf, Carol A., ed. The Critical Introduction to Bram Stoker. Westport, Conn.: Greenwood Press, 1993.
- Shepherd, Mike. When Brave Men Shudder: The Scottish Origins of Dracula. Newcastle upon Tyne, UK: Wild Wolf Publishing, 2018.
- Stoker, Bram. Dracula's Guest and Other Weird Stories: With The Lair of the White Worm. Edited with an Introduction and Notes by Kate Hebblethwaite. London: Penguin Books, 2006.
- Stoker, Bram. The Bram Stoker Bedside Companion: Stories of fantasy and horror. Edited and with an Introduction by Charles Osborne. London: Victor Gollancz Ltd., 1973.
