= Dracula's Daughter =

1936 film by Lambert Hillyer

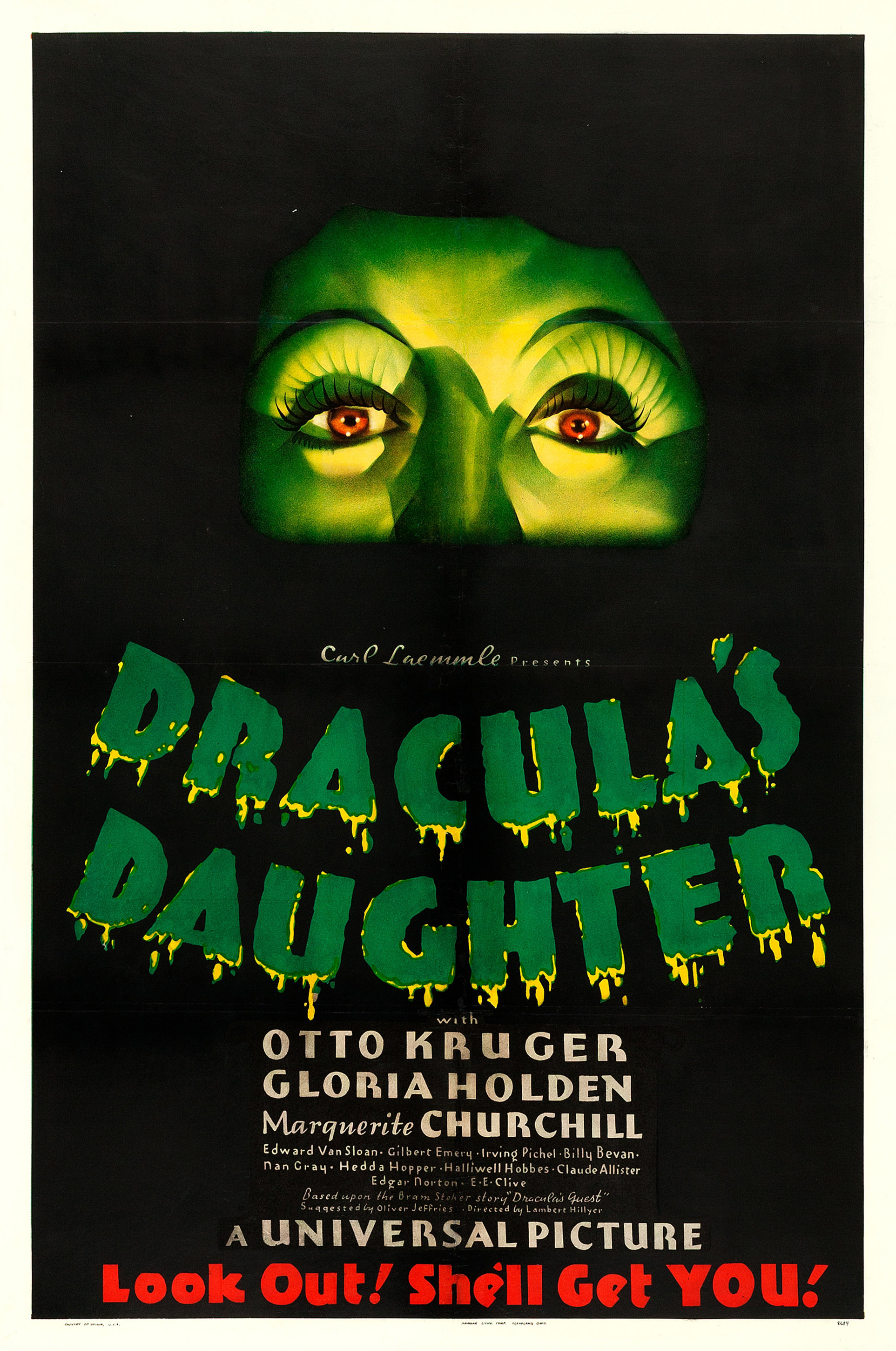
- Theatrical release poster by Karoly Grosz
- Directed by: Lambert Hillyer
- Written by: Suggested by: Oliver Jeffries; Treatment: John L. Balderston; Kurt Neumann; Contributing: R. C. Sherriff; Peter Dunne; Charles S. Belden
- Screenplay by: Garrett Fort
- Story by: John L. Balderston
- Based on: "Dracula's Guest"; 1914 story by Bram Stoker
- Produced by: E. M. Asher
- Starring: Otto Kruger; Gloria Holden; Marguerite Churchill
- Cinematography: George Robinson
- Edited by: Milton Carruth
- Music by: Heinz Roemheld
- Production company: Universal Pictures
- Distributed by: Universal Pictures
- Release date: May 11, 1936
- Running time: 71 minutes
- Country: United States
- Language: English
- Budget: $278,000

Dracula's Daughter is a 1936 American vampire film produced by Universal Pictures as a sequel to the 1931 film Dracula. Directed by Lambert Hillyer from a screenplay by Garrett Fort, the film stars Otto Kruger, Gloria Holden in the title role, and Marguerite Churchill, and features, as the only cast member to return from the original, Edward Van Sloan – although his character's name was altered from "Van Helsing" to "Von Helsing".

Dracula's Daughter tells the story of Countess Marya Zaleska, the daughter of Count Dracula and herself a vampire. Following Dracula's death, she believes that by destroying his body, she will be free of his influence and live normally. When this fails, she turns to a psychiatrist, Dr. Jeffrey Garth (Kruger). The Countess kidnaps Dr. Garth's assistant, Janet (Marguerite Churchill), and takes her to Transylvania, leading to a battle between Dr. Garth and the Countess in an attempt by him to save Janet.

Ostensibly based on an omitted chapter from Bram Stoker's 1897 novel Dracula – published in 1914 as a short story entitled "Dracula's Guest" – the film bears absolutely no resemblance to the source material. Modern sources maintain that the film was instead loosely based on Carmilla, an 1872 Gothic novella by Joseph Sheridan Le Fanu, which is often cited as the first published British work of fiction to deal with lesbian relationships.

David O. Selznick purchased the rights to the Stoker material for Metro-Goldwyn-Mayer, but Universal bought them in 1934, with the rights to revert to MGM if Universal did not begin production by October 1935, a date later extended to February 1936. Universal rushed the film into production in that month, with the script only partially completed, to meet this deadline. The film was first assigned to James Whale, but Universal production head Carl Laemmle Jr. finally hired Hillyer as director.

While not as successful as the original upon its release, the film was generally well-reviewed. In the intervening decades, criticism has been deeply divided. Contemporary critics and scholars have observed the film's alleged lesbian overtones, which Universal exploited in some early advertising.

== Plot ==
Having just destroyed Count Dracula, Professor Van Helsing is arrested by two Whitby policemen, Sergeant Wilkes and Constable Albert, after they happen upon Dracula's body with a stake driven through its heart (as well as the broken-necked corpse of Renfield) in the cellar of Carfax Abbey. Van Helsing is taken to Scotland Yard, where he explains to Sir Basil Humphrey that he did indeed destroy Dracula, but because the vampire had already been dead for over 500 years, it cannot be considered murder. Instead of hiring a lawyer, Van Helsing enlists the aid of a psychiatrist, Dr. Jeffrey Garth, who was formerly one of his star students.

In Whitby, Sergeant Wilkes leaves the jail to meet an officer from Scotland Yard at the train station, placing Constable Albert in charge of the recovered bodies. Meanwhile, Dracula's daughter, Countess Marya Zaleska, enters the jail, mesmerizes Albert with her jeweled ring, and – with the aid of her manservant, Sandor – steals Dracula's body from the jail. After tossing salt on the pyre, the Countess ritualistically burns Dracula's body, hoping to break her curse of vampirism. However, Sandor soon begins to discourage her, telling her that all that is in her eyes is "death". She soon gives in to her thirst for blood. The Countess resumes her hunting, mesmerising her victims with her exotic jewelled ring. After a chance meeting with Dr. Garth at a society party, the Countess asks him to help her overcome the influence she feels from beyond the grave. The doctor advises her to defeat her cravings by confronting them, and the Countess becomes hopeful that her will, plus Dr. Garth's science, will be strong enough to overcome Dracula's malevolence.

The Countess sends Sandor to fetch her a model to paint. He sees a pretty young woman, Lili, and follows her onto a bridge. The woman pauses at the railing looking despondent. Sandor promises her food, warmth, and money. She hesitates, but Sandor explains that he seeks her for his mistress. Lili returns with Sandor. Countess Zaleska initially resists her urges, but succumbs and attacks her. Lili survives the attack and is examined by Dr. Garth through hypnosis; she reveals enough information to let Dr. Garth know that it was Countess Zaleska who attacked her, but she suffers heart failure and dies. The Countess gives up fighting her urges and accepts that a cure is not possible; she lures Dr. Garth to Transylvania by kidnapping Janet Blake, his secretary, with whom he has a playfully antagonistic relationship, but now realises that he cares for her. Zaleska intends to transform Dr. Garth into a vampire to be her eternal companion. Arriving at Castle Dracula in Transylvania, Dr. Garth agrees to exchange his life for Janet's. Before he can be transformed, Countess Zaleska is destroyed when Sandor shoots her through the heart with an arrow as revenge for her breaking her promise to make him immortal. He takes aim at Dr. Garth, but is shot dead by a Scotland Yard policeman, who along with Van Helsing, has followed Dr. Garth from London.

== Cast ==
- Otto Kruger as Dr. Jeffrey Garth
- Gloria Holden as Countess Marya Zaleska, Dracula's daughter
- Marguerite Churchill as Janet Blake
- Irving Pichel as Sandor
- Halliwell Hobbes as Hawkins
- Billy Bevan as Constable Albert
- Nan Grey as Lili
- Hedda Hopper as Lady Esme Hammond
- Claud Allister as Sir Aubrey Bedford
- Gilbert Emery as Sir Basil Humphrey, Scotland Yard
- Edward Van Sloan as Professor Von Helsing
- Edgar Norton as Hobbs, Sir Humphrey's butler
- E. E. Clive as Sergeant Wilkes
- Christian Rub as Coachman (uncredited)
- Vernon Steele as Squires (uncredited)
- Fred Walton as Dr. Beemish (uncredited)

== Production ==
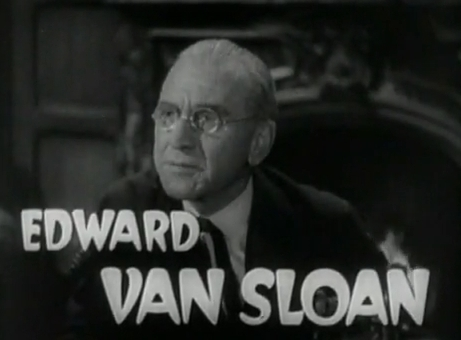
Edward Van Sloan as Von Helsing

Universal originally did not hold the rights to "Dracula's Guest", a chapter excised from Bram Stoker's original novel, which was published in 1914, after Stoker's death, as a short story, and which was the purported source material for the film. Metro-Goldwyn-Mayer executive David O. Selznick negotiated a contract in 1933 with Stoker's widow, Florence, to buy the rights to the chapter for an advance of $500 against a purchase price of $5,000. MGM's lawyers and executives were worried about the use of the word "Dracula" in the film's title, fearing that Universal would take legal action, although Selznick's contract with Stoker explicitly listed "Dracula's Daughter" as a possible alternative title. The project was code-named "Tarantula" in correspondence. Universal bought the rights from MGM in 1934, but they would revert to MGM if Universal did not begin production by October 1935, a date later extended to February 1936. Universal rushed the show into production in that month, with the script only partially completed, to meet this deadline.

Modern sources report that the film was also loosely based on Carmilla, an 1872 Gothic novella by Joseph Sheridan le Fanu, which is often cited as the first published British work of fiction to deal with lesbian relationships.

Selznick hired John L. Balderston, who had previously worked on the 1931 Dracula and Frankenstein, to write the screenplay. Balderston's screenplay involved tying up loose ends from the original film. In it, Von Helsing returns to Transylvania to destroy the three vampire brides seen in Dracula, but overlooks a fourth tomb concealing Dracula's daughter. She follows him back to London and operates under the name "Countess Szekelsky". She attacks a young aristocrat, and Von Helsing and the aristocrat's fiancée track her back to Transylvania and destroy her. The script included scenes that implied that Dracula's daughter enjoyed torturing her male victims, and that while under her control, the men liked it, too. Also included were shots of the Countess's chambers being stocked with whips and straps, which she would never use on-screen but whose uses the audience could imagine. Regardless of any objections that the Production Code Administration (PCA) would have raised to many aspects of the scenario, Balderston's script could never have been filmed because Selznick's contract with Stoker expressly barred him from using any Bram Stoker characters that did not appear in "Dracula's Guest". Selznick resold the rights to "Dracula's Guest" to Universal in October 1934 or September 1935 for $12,500, which included the rights to Balderston's scenario. Horror film scholar David J. Skal theorizes that this was Selznick's actual motivation in buying the rights in the first place, to profit from Universal's desire for a sequel by tying up the only obvious source material. A condition of the sale was that the rights would revert to MGM if Universal did not start production by October 1935, later extended to February 1936.

=== Director ===
Universal studio head Carl Laemmle, Jr. (nicknamed "Junior") wanted James Whale, fresh from his great success with Bride of Frankenstein, to direct Dracula's Daughter. Whale was waiting for Irene Dunne to finish shooting Magnificent Obsession, so she could begin work on Whale's Show Boat. Wary of directing two horror films in a row, Whale instead convinced Laemmle to buy the rights to a mystery novel called The Hangover Murders. Laemmle agreed only after extracting a promise from Whale that he would direct Dracula's Daughter next. Whale completed work on the film, Remember Last Night?, on September 14, 1935. Magnificent Obsession completed filming on October 29. With Dunne freed up, Whale went to work on Show Boat. Laemmle replaced him with A. Edward Sutherland, who was best known for his work on comedies. Sutherland had as little interest in Dracula's Daughter as Whale did, and soon left the studio, so Hillyer came on to direct.

=== Universal script ===
A treatment by John L. Balderston was submitted to Universal in January 1934, and may have been presented to MGM earlier. Another short treatment by Kurt Neumann was rejected by Universal.

The earliest screenplay for the Universal film was written by R. C. Sherriff and submitted in July 1935. It began with three scenes set in the 14th century and centered on the Dracula legend. It then switched to the present day, focusing on two engaged couples who visit Transylvania. The men explore the ruins of Dracula's castle. One is later found, insane, and the other goes missing. Professor Von Helsing is summoned, and he tracks the missing man to London, where he is in thrall to Dracula's daughter, the Countess Szelinski (sic). When she attempts to flee with her thrall to the Orient by ship, Von Helsing and three others book passage on the same ship. During a violent storm, Von Helsing destroys Dracula's daughter, and with her hold over the men broken, the scenario closes with a double wedding. This version was submitted on August 28, 1935, to the British Board of Film Censors, which rejected it, saying in part "Dracula's Daughter would require half a dozen ... languages to adequately express its beastliness". On September 10, Sherriff met with BBFC representatives and submitted a revised scenario two days later. This scenario was passed, but because its details were not recorded by the BBFC, how much it differed from the original or how much if any of that scenario was retained in the final script is unknown.

Universal submitted Sheriff's first draft to the Production Code Administration (PCA) on September 5, 1935, and encountered stronger resistance from PCA head Joseph Breen than it had from the British censors. Breen reported back that the script "contains countless offensive stuff which makes the picture utterly impossible for approval under the Production Code". A second draft was submitted on October 21, but it, too, was rejected, with many of Breen's objections centering on the 14th-century scenes in which Dracula himself appeared. Whether this submission was the same submission that the BBFC had previously passed is unclear. A third Sheriff draft was submitted three days later, and Sherriff's fourth and final draft was on November 10. All remained unacceptable, and Whale biographer James Curtis suggests that Whale, who had no interest in the project and feared that his commitment to it might cost him control over the filming of Show Boat, encouraged Sherriff to submit ever more wildly unacceptable versions in hopes of getting himself off the film. On January 14, 1936, producer E. M. Asher advised Breen that the Sherriff script was not going to be used and that a new script would be put together from scratch.

Screenwriting duties were then assigned to Garrett Fort, who submitted a draft in January 1936, and a second draft in February. Asher, Fort, and Universal executive Harry Zehner meet with Production Code officials in February, during which Universal was asked that the scene in which Lili poses for Marya be written so that no suggestion was made that Lili was nude, or that no indication was made of a "perverse sexual desire on the part of Marya or of an attempted sexual attack by her upon Lili".

Fort's February draft, as revised by Charles Belden in March 1936, seems to be the version used to shoot the film, which was viewed and passed by the PCA in April. Fort is the only contributor to the screenplay to receive screen credit, along with Stoker.

=== Casting ===
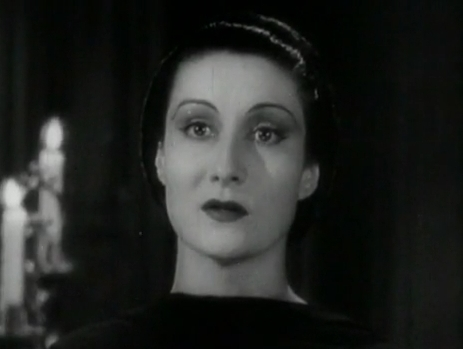
Gloria Holden

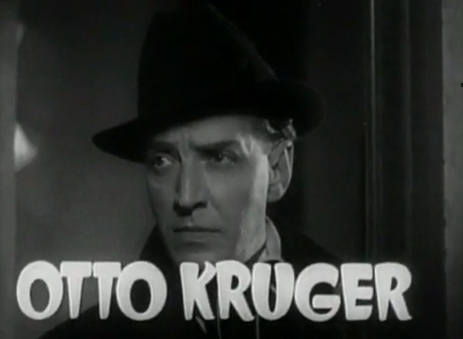

Dracula's Daughter was Gloria Holden's first starring role, and reportedly she was extremely displeased at having been assigned it. Like many actors, Holden looked down on horror films. She had also seen Bela Lugosi struggle over the years since Dracula was made to free himself from typecasting, and feared that the role would lead to the same fate for her. Critic Mark Clark believes that, ironically, Holden's disgust for the role may have led to the quality of her performance: "Her disdain for the part translates into a kind of self-loathing that perfectly suits her troubled character".

Initially, Lugosi and Jane Wyatt were set to star in the film. Universal also announced that Boris Karloff and Colin Clive, who had starred together in Frankenstein and Bride of Frankenstein, would appear, and that Cesar Romero would play Dr. Garth with Lugosi playing Dracula and Wyatt playing Lili, who was eventually played by actress Nan Grey because Grey was a blonde, giving contrast to her and actress Gloria Holden who had black hair. According to The Hollywood Reporter, Universal had sought Herbert Marshall for the role of Sandor, before casting Pichel. None of them appeared except, after a fashion, Lugosi, in the form of a wax bust molded in his image for use in Dracula's coffin. Some sources report that Lugosi was paid as much as $4,000 for his abortive involvement, but the only confirmed record of any financial arrangement is a letter in which Lugosi consents to the use of his likeness at no cost to create the wax bust.

=== Shooting ===
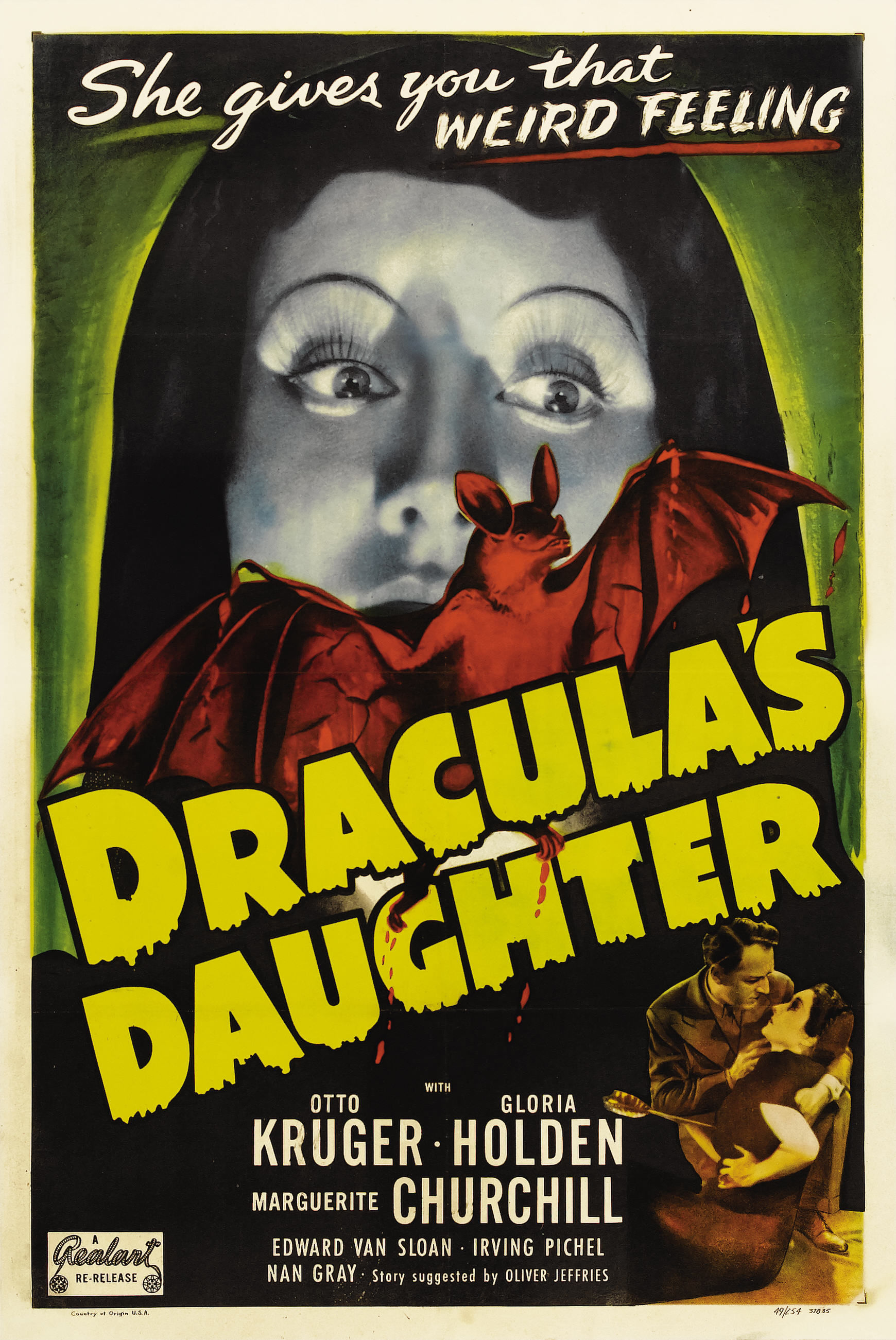
Theatrical poster

Shooting on Dracula's Daughter began on February 4, 1936, rushed into production before Fort had completed the script, because of a deadline clause in Universal's option of the property from Selznick. The script was not finalized until shooting had been underway for three weeks. The film was completed on March 10. Despite studio orders that the film be shot on a seven-day-per-week schedule, filming ran seven days over its schedule and $50,000 over budget, with the final cost of the film tallied at $278,380.

Dracula's Daughter was the last in the first cycle of Universal Horror films that reached back into the 1920s. Publicly, Universal said it was because a British ban on horror films would cut too deeply into the revenue such films could generate. In truth, the cycle was suspended because, just before filming on Dracula's Daughter had wrapped, the Laemmle family had lost control of Universal. Because of cost overruns on a number of pictures, Junior Laemmle was forced to borrow $1,000,000 on November 1, 1935. The money came from J. Cheever Cowdin, head of the Standard Capital Corporation, and from Charles R. Rogers. When the loan was called in March of the following year, Universal was unable to repay it. Standard assumed control of the studio on March 4 and Rogers replaced Junior as head of production. Rogers did not like horror films, and he shut down production on them following the release of Dracula's Daughter to focus on fare like Deanna Durbin musicals. Universal did not return to the horror genre for three years, when it released Son of Frankenstein in 1939.

=== Other production aspects ===
Makeup artist Jack Pierce and special effects supervisor John P. Fulton worked together closely, especially on Holden's make-up design. They combined special lighting with a greyish-green make-up for Holden's final scenes, creating a pallor that contrasted with the more normally flesh-toned make-ups of the others in the scene. Heinz Roemheld composed the score and Albert S. D'Agostino redressed Charles D. Hall's set of Dracula's castle and created new sets, including a London bridge, the moor where Dracula's body is burned, and Countess Zaleska's apartment.

== Critical response ==
The New York Times gave Dracula's Daughter a solid, albeit somewhat tongue-in-cheek, review upon its release, citing the film's "blood-curdling events" and noting that "Gloria Holden is a remarkably convincing bat-woman" in concluding that the film is both "quite terrifying" and "a cute little horror picture". Variety also praised the production and Holden's performance in particular. Despite critical approval, Dracula's Daughter did not have the same box office success as the original.

Later reviews of Dracula's Daughter are sharply split. Entertainment Weekly, reviewing the film following its video release, called it "one of the most satisfying vampire pictures ever made". Describing director Hillyer's visuals as "lush, evocative, and suffused with just the right gothic chiaroscuro" and noting that "Gloria Holden, as the reluctant vampire protagonist, absolutely drips patrician eroticism", EW concludes that this film is better than Lugosi's original Dracula.

Ryan Cracknell of Apollo Movie Guide, while echoing the praise for Holden's performance, nonetheless found that the film "doesn't hold up so well today". Citing what he sees as slow pacing and "long bouts of over-the-top dialogue", Cracknell compares the film to "reading a textbook – not the most exciting thing in the world, but it does provide insights into and perspectives on the foundation of early horror movies and how many similarities carry over into movies half a century and more later". Michael W. Phillips, Jr., concurs, calling the film "a marked improvement on the original film, [but] still a bit of a snooze, relying too much on forced comedy and not enough on suspense or fright". Phillips again praises Holden's performance and also Pichel's portrayal of Sandor, but finds the rest of the cast weak.

== Influence ==
Horror author Anne Rice has named Dracula's Daughter as a direct inspiration for her own homoerotic vampire fiction. She named a bar in her novel The Vampire Lestat "Dracula's Daughter" in honor of the film. Author Ramsey Campbell, under the pseudonym "Carl Dreadstone", wrote a novelization of the film also entitled Dracula's Daughter that was published in 1977. A juvenile fiction version, written by Carl R. Green, William R. Sanford and Howard Schroeder, was published in 1985. Some observers have suggested that the film served as an inspiration for Sunset Blvd., noting similarities between the outlines of each film. Michael Almereyda's 1994 film Nadja has been described as an "unofficial remake" of Dracula's Daughter. Universal's 2024 film Abigail was initially mooted as a new version of Dracula's Daughter but bears no similarity to the 1936 film and Dracula is not named on screen.

== Lesbian implications ==
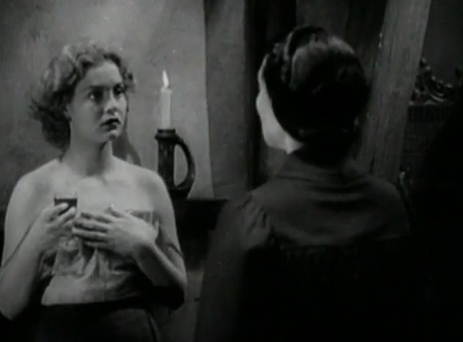
"Save the women of London from Dracula's Daughter!" Countess Zaleska seduces Lili.

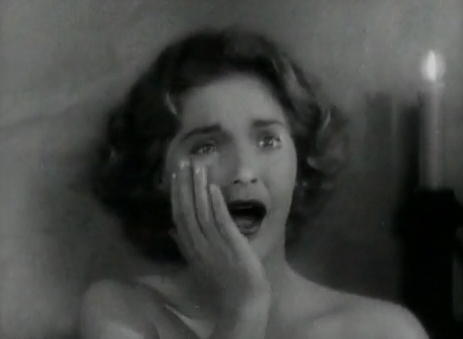
Nan Grey

The lesbian vampire has long been a trend in literature, dating back to such works as Samuel Taylor Coleridge's 1797 poem Christabel and Sheridan Le Fanu's 1872 novella Carmilla. Dracula's Daughter marked the first time that the trend was incorporated into a film. The lesbian implications of Dracula's Daughter were of great concern to the Production Code Administration. PCA head Breen took special notice of the scene between the Countess and her model, Lili, writing: "This will need very careful handling to avoid any questionable flavor". The day before the scene was to be shot, Universal's Harry Zehner asked Breen to read a draft of the scene. In response, Breen wrote:

The present suggestion that ... Lili poses in the nude will be changed. She will be posing her neck and shoulders, and there will be no suggestion that she undresses, and there will be no exposure of her person. It was also stated that the present incomplete sequence will be followed by a scene in which Lili is taken to a hospital and there it will be definitely established that she has been attacked by a vampire. The whole sequence will be treated in such a way as to avoid any suggestion of perverse sexual desire on the part of Marya or of an attempted sexual attack by her upon Lili.

Gay film historian Vito Russo noted in his book The Celluloid Closet that Universal highlighted Countess Zaleska's attraction to women in some of its original advertising for the film, using the tag line "Save the women of London from Dracula's Daughter!" He further cited Countess Zaleska as an example of the presentation of the "essence of homosexuality as a predatory weakness". Some reviewers of the day picked up on and condemned the lesbian content, including the New York World-Telegram, which noted the Countess's tendency to wander around "giving the eye to sweet young girls". Other reviews missed it entirely, including the aforementioned The New York Times, which advised "Be sure to bring the kiddies". Entertainment Weekly describes the encounter between the Countess and Lili as "so hot it's impossible to imagine how it ever got past '30s censors" whereas Time Out London finds only a "subtle suggestion" of lesbianism. Horror scholar Skal notes that the scene has come to be seen as a "classic 'lesbian' sequence, although of a decidedly negative stripe". The scene between Countess Zaleska and Lili was included in the 1995 documentary film adaptation of Russo's book.

Another lesbian-tinged scene which has received less critical attention comes when the Countess is holding Janet captive. Described as "the longest kiss never filmed", Countess Zaleska "hovers lovingly over Janet ... hovers ... and hovers ... slowly descending to kiss the recumbent Janet ..." until interrupted by the arrival of Dr. Garth.

A 1998 article published by Bright Lights Film Journal said "Gloria Holden in the title role almost singlehandedly redefined the '20s movie vamp as an impressive Euro-butch dyke bloodsucker", but draws an implicit comparison between Countess Zaleska's seeking to cure her vampirism through psychiatry and the former position of mainstream psychiatry of homosexuality as a mental illness. Zaleska's cruising the streets of London is seen as parallel to cruising for sex (although that tends to be a gay male activity) and as suggesting "society's image of the lesbian as soulless predator", but the conclusion is that "Holden's striking, masklike face and haunting, luminous eyes [are] the intoxicating essence of transgressive lesbian power".

== Reboot ==
In April 2023, it was reported that Universal Pictures was developing a film for Universal Pictures, with Matt Bettinelli-Olpin and Tyler Gillett attached to co-direct, from a script co-written by Stephen Shields and Guy Busick. The project was stated to be a modern-day adaptation of an older character, similar in approach to The Invisible Man (2020) or Renfield (2023).

The project was originally titled Dracula's Daughter. It was released as Abigail on April 7, 2024. Manohla Dargis wrote in The New York Times that in press releases of the film several vampire films were name-checked, with Dracula's Daughter not being among them and that the final film had very little similarity to Hillyer's film.

== See also ==
- Vampire film

== Bibliography ==
- Abbott, Stacey (2007). Celluloid Vampires: Life After Death in the Modern World. University of Texas Press. ISBN 978-0-292-71695-7.
- Bansak, Edmund G. and Robert Wise (2003). Fearing the Dark: The Val Lewton Career. McFarland. ISBN 0-7864-1709-9.
- Branaghan, Sim; Chibnall, Stephen (2006). British Film Posters: An Illustrated History. United Kingdom: Cambridge University Press. ISBN 1-84457-221-8.
- Brunas, Michael, John Brunas & Tom Weaver (1990). Universal Horrors: The Studios Classic Films, 1931-46. McFarland.
- Clark, Mark (2004). Smirk, Sneer and Scream: Great Acting in Horror Cinema. McFarland. ISBN 0-7864-1932-6.
- Curtis, James (1998). James Whale: A New World of Gods and Monsters. Boston, Faber and Faber. ISBN 0-571-19285-8.
- Hanson, Ellis (1999). Out Takes: Essays on Queer Theory and Film. Duke University Press. ISBN 0-8223-2342-7.
- Johnson, Tom (1997). Censored Screams: The British Ban on Hollywood Horror in the Thirties. McFarland. ISBN 0-7864-0394-2.
- Keesey, Pam (1997) Vamps: An Illustrated History of the Femme Fatale. San Francisco, Cleis Press. ISBN 1-57344-026-4.
- Mank, Gregory W. (1999) Women in Horror Films, 1930s. McFarland. ISBN 0-7864-0553-8.
- Melton, J. Gordon (1994). The Vampire Book: The Encyclopedia of the Undead. Detroit, Visible Ink Press (a division of Gale Research, Inc.). ISBN 0-8103-2295-1.
- Rhodes, Gary Don (1997). Lugosi: His Life in Films, on Stage, and in the Hearts of Horror Lovers. McFarland. ISBN 0-7864-0257-1.
- Hoppenstand, Gary, and Ray Broadus Browne (1996) The Gothic World of Anne Rice. Popular Press. ISBN 0-87972-708-X.
- Robertson, James Crighton (1993). The Hidden Cinema: British Film Censorship in Action, 1913–1975. Routledge. ISBN 0-415-09034-2.
- Russo, Vito (1987). The Celluloid Closet: Homosexuality in the Movies (revised edition). New York, HarperCollins. ISBN 0-06-096132-5.
- Senn, Bryan (1996). Golden Horrors: An Illustrated Critical Filmography of Terror Cinema, 1931 & 1939. McFarland. ISBN 0-7864-0175-3.
- Skal, David J. (1993). The Monster Show: A Cultural History of Horror. Penguin Books. ISBN 0-14-024002-0.
- Tudor, Andrew (1989). Monsters and Mad Scientists: A Cultural History of the Horror Movie. Blackwell Publishing. ISBN 0-631-16992-X.
- White, David Manning (1975). Popular Culture. Ayer Publishing. ISBN 0-405-06649-X.
- Worland, Rick (2007). The Horror Film: An Introduction. Blackwell Publishing. ISBN 1-4051-3902-1.
- Rhodes, Gary D., Weaver, Tom, et al. (2017) Scripts from the Crypt: Dracula's Daughter. BearManor. ISBN 9781629331164.
