= Dracula's Guest =

1914 short story by Bram Stoker

- Short story by Bram Stoker
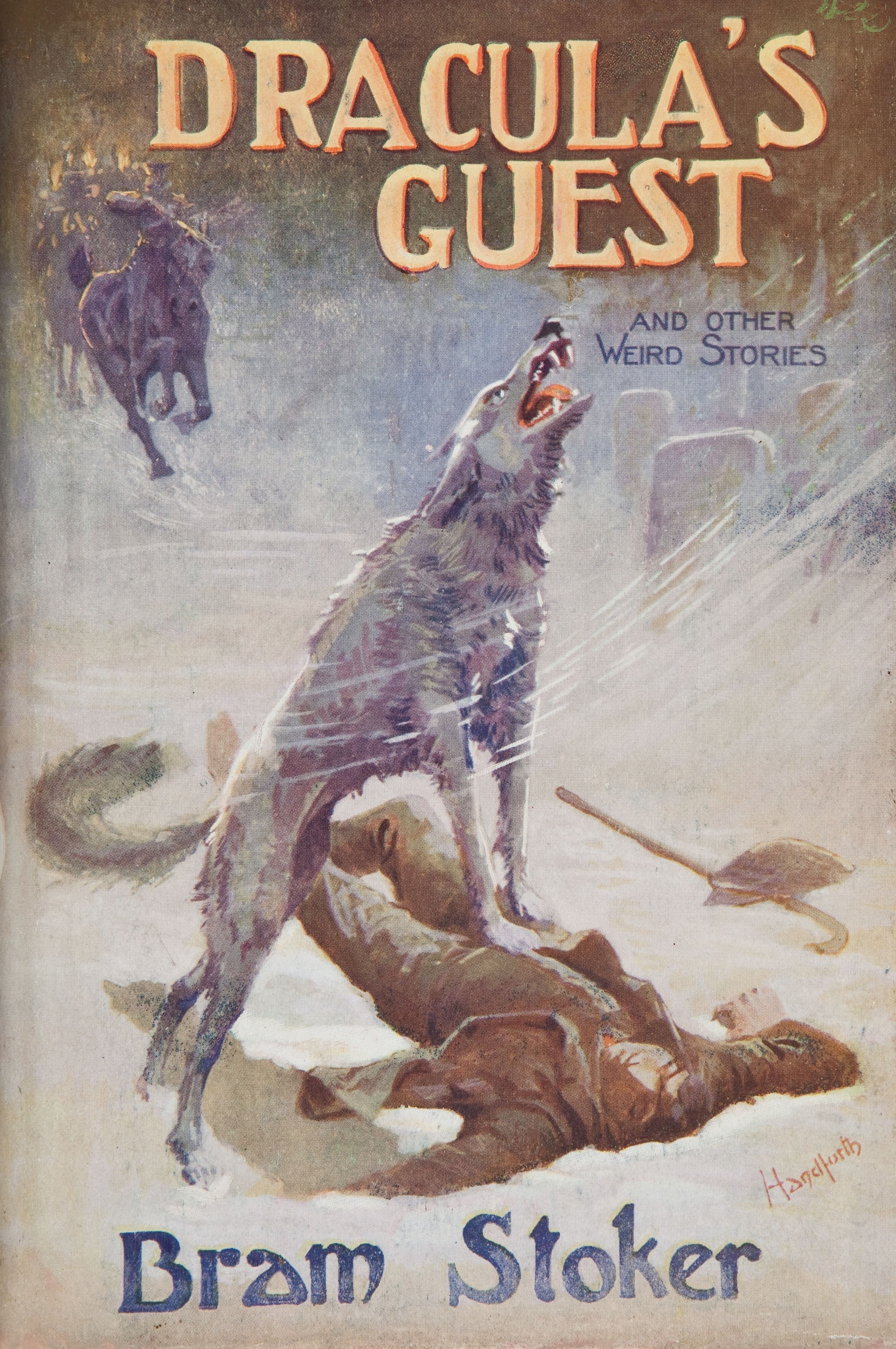
- Cover of Dracula's Guest and Other Weird Stories (1914)
- Country: UK
- Language: English
- Genre: Horror

Publication
- Published in: Dracula's Guest and Other Weird Stories
- Publisher: George Routledge & Sons, Ltd., London.
- Media type: Hardcover
- Publication date: 1914

"Dracula's Guest" is a short story by Bram Stoker, first published in the posthumous 1914 collection Dracula's Guest and Other Weird Stories. Scholars are divided as to whether the story is the excised first chapter of the novel Dracula, an early draft of a chapter of that novel, or was always intended as a separate story. Although some elements of the story were incorporated into the novel, critics point to differences in style and characterisation between the story and the novel. Critics have also noted similarities with Sheridan Le Fanu's novella Carmilla.

The story concerns an unnamed young Englishman who is visiting Munich on his way to a meeting with Dracula in Transylvania. During a walk in the countryside he has mysterious encounters with a beautiful woman asleep in a tomb and with a wolf.

== Background and publication ==
Bram Stoker produced over 100 pages of notes for Dracula. The earliest surviving notes are dated from 1890, seven years before the novel's publication. The notes show that early drafts of Chapters 2 and 3 of Dracula were to include the narrator's time in Munich, including an adventure in a snow storm involving a wolf. Dracula scholars Elizabeth Miller and Robert Eighteen-Bisang write that "Dracula's Guest" evolved from these plot ideas.

In 1914—two years after Stoker's death—Florence Stoker, his widow and literary executor, published Dracula's Guest and Other Weird Tales, a collection of nine short stories. In the book's preface, Florence wrote that "Dracula's Guest" was an episode from Dracula that was excised due to the novel's length.

Several scholars have argued that the story was an excised first chapter of Dracula, noting that the novel begins with Jonathan Harker leaving Munich on 1 May, while the story is set on the outskirts of Munich on Walpurgis night, 30 April. Radu Florescu and Raymond T. McNally's The Essential Dracula (1979) was the first edition of Dracula to include the story as part of the novel. Elizabeth Miller, however, argues that although "Dracula's Guest" was part of the original plan for Dracula, it was never intended as the first chapter. Clive Leatherdale agrees that "the widely held notion" that the episode was once the first chapter of Dracula is incorrect.

David O. Selznick bought the film rights to "Dracula's Guest" in 1933 and later re-sold them to Universal Studios. Universal's film Dracula's Daughter (1936) was ostensibly based on the story, although it uses nothing from the plot.

== Plot ==
An unnamed young Englishman is visiting Munich on his way to Transylvania and decides to take a drive in the countryside. The hotelier warns the coachman not to return late as a storm is brewing and it is Walpurgis Night. The Englishman asks the coachman to take a side road which dips through a valley but the driver refuses, saying that the road only leads to an abandoned village which is "unholy". The Englishman decides to walk. He turns to look at the departing carriage and sees a tall, thin man appear over the crest of a hill. The horses are terrified at the sight of the man, and the carriage bolts away towards Munich. The tall man disappears.

The Englishman continues down the road and reaches the valley as snow falls and a storm begins. He takes shelter in a grove of cypress and yew trees and hears the howling of a wolf. The snow stops falling and he leaves the grove in search of better shelter in the abandoned village. Moonlight breaks through the clouds, revealing that he is in a graveyard and standing before the sepulchre of Countess Dolingen of Graz, Styria. The storm renews itself and the man huddles against the door of the sepulchre to shelter from the driving hail. The door opens under his weight and a flash of forked lightning reveals a beautiful woman, apparently asleep on the bier. A lightning bolt strikes the tomb and kills the woman. The man is thrown from the tomb and falls unconscious in the hail.

He slowly regains his senses and realises that a huge wolf is sitting on his chest and licking his throat. Mounted soldiers bearing torches approach and the wolf flees, pursued by soldiers who fire at it. Some soldiers revive the Englishman with brandy and when the others return they report that they did not catch the animal that is "a wolf—and yet not a wolf".

The soldiers return the Englishman to his Munich hotel. The hotel keeper explains that when the coachman had returned and had told him what had happened he had decided to send out a search party. He had also received a telegram from the Englishman's host, Dracula, warning him to take good care of his guest as there were "dangers from snow and wolves and night".

== Critical analysis ==
Leslie S. Klinger notes that "Dracula's Guest" has very little in common with the 1897 novel. Leatherdale writes that whereas the early chapters of Dracula are written as a series of diary entries, "Dracula's Guest" is a conventional first-person narrative. He states that the unnamed narrator of the story is also more self-confident and assertive than Harker in the novel and, unlike Harker, he does not speak German. He argues that the style of "Dracula's Guest" suggests it was written in the early 1890s, either as a draft of an early chapter of Dracula or as a separate story.

Critics have noted that various lines of text and plot elements of the story were incorporated into Dracula, including the line "The dead travel fast" from Gottfried Bürger's poem "Lenore". Eighteen-Bisang and Miller write that the opening of the story is similar to the introduction to Sabine Baring-Gould's The Book of Were-Wolves (1865). In "Dracula's Guest", the narrator insists on going for a walk to an abandoned village despite being warned that it is Walpurgis night. In Baring-Gould's book, the author goes for a late night walk in the woods around Vienna despite the locals warning him of werewolves.

Academic Roger Luckhurst notes the story's "strong debts" to Sheridan Le Fanu's Carmilla. The narrator walks to an abandoned village where he finds a beautiful woman, seemingly asleep in the marble tomb of Countess Dolingen of Graz in Styria. In Carmilla, the vampire is tracked to an abandoned village and is found in the tomb of the Countess Karnstein of Styria.

== Sources ==
- Eighteen-Bisang, Robert; Miller, Elizabeth (2008). Bram Stoker's Notes for Dracula: A Facsimile Edition. McFarland & Co. Pub. ISBN 978-0-7864-5186-9. OCLC 335291872.
- Eighteen-Bisang, Robert (2005a). "Other Noteworthy Editions". In Miller, Elizabeth (ed.). Dictionary of Literary Biography, Volume 304: Bram Stoker's Dracula, A Documentary Volume. Thompson Gale. ISBN 078766841-9.
- Hughes, William; Smith, Andrew, eds. (1998). Bram Stoker: History, Psychoanalysis and the Gothic. Macmillan Press. ISBN 978-1-349-26840-5.
- Bierman, Joseph S. "A Crucial Stage in the Writing of Dracula". In Hughes & Smith (1998).
- Frayling, Christopher (1992). Vampyres: Lord Byron to Count Dracula. Faber. ISBN 978-0-571-16792-0.
- Miller, Elizabeth, ed. (2005). "Bram Stoker's Working Papers for Dracula". Dictionary of Literary Biography, Volume 304: Bram Stoker's Dracula, A Documentary Volume. Thompson Gale. ISBN 078766841-9.
- Frayling, Christopher; Miller, Elizabeth. "Bram Stoker's Working Papers for Dracula". In Miller (2005), pp. 170–181.
- Leatherdale, Clive (2005). "'Dracula's Guest' and Dracula". In Miller, Elizabeth (ed.). Dictionary of Literary Biography, Volume 304: Bram Stoker's Dracula, A Documentary Volume. Thompson Gale. ISBN 078766841-9.
- Luckhurst, Roger (2011). "Appendix: 'Dracula's Guest'". In Luckhurst, Roger (ed.). Bram Stoker: Dracula. Oxford University Press. ISBN 9780199564095.
- Miller, Elizabeth (2006). Dracula: Sense and Nonsense (2nd ed.). Desert Island Books. ISBN 9781905328154.
- Skal, David J. (2001). The monster show: a cultural history of horror. Faber and Faber. ISBN 978-0-571-19996-9.
- Sims, Michael, ed. Dracula's Guest: A Connoisseur's Collection of Victorian Vampire Stories. New York: Walker and Company, 2010.
- Stoker, Bram; Klinger, Leslie S. (2008). The New Annotated Dracula. W.W. Norton & Co. ISBN 978-0-393-06450-6. OCLC 227016511.
- Stoker, Bram (2019). Eighteen-Bisang, Robert; Miller, Elizabeth (eds.). Drafts of Dracula. Tellwell Talent. ISBN 9780228814313.
- Hughes, William. Beyond Dracula: Bram Stoker’s Fiction and Its Cultural Context. Springer, 2000.
- Senf, Carol A., ed. The Critical Introduction to Bram Stoker. Westport, Conn.: Greenwood Press, 1993.
- Shepherd, Mike. When Brave Men Shudder: The Scottish Origins of Dracula. Newcastle upon Tyne, UK: Wild Wolf Publishing, 2018.
- Stoker, Bram. Dracula's Guest and Other Weird Stories: With The Lair of the White Worm. Edited with an Introduction and Notes by Kate Hebblethwaite. London: Penguin Books, 2006.
- Stoker, Bram. The Bram Stoker Bedside Companion: Stories of fantasy and horror. Edited and with an Introduction by Charles Osborne. London: Victor Gollancz Ltd., 1973.
