= The Judge's House =

- Short story by Bram Stoker
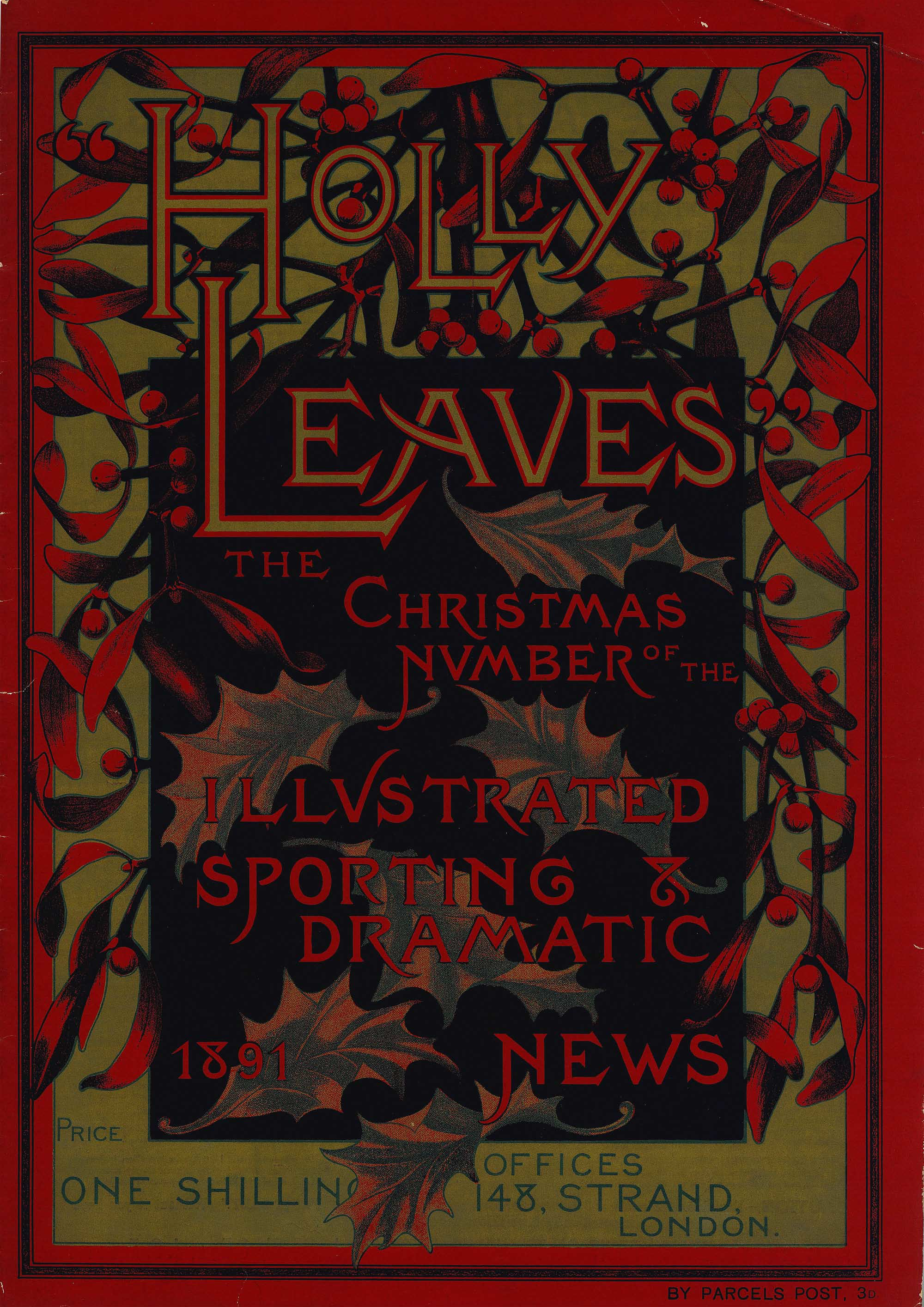
- "The Judge's House" was first published in Holly Leaves, the Christmas edition of the Illustrated Sporting and Dramatic News, on 5 December 1891.

Text available at Wikisource
- Country: United Kingdom
- Language: English
- Genres: Ghost story, Supernatural

Publication
- Published in: Holly Leaves
- Media type: Print
- Publication date: 5 December 1891

"The Judge's House" is a supernatural or ghost story by the Irish writer Bram Stoker, first published in Holly Leaves, the Christmas edition of the Illustrated Sporting and Dramatic News, on 5 December 1891.

The story is about a student's supernatural experiences and terrors in a reportedly haunted mansion.

== Plot summary ==
Malcolm Malcolmson, a student, journeys to the market town of Benchurch to seek isolation to prepare for a Mathematical Tripos examination. He decides to lease a remote Jacobean mansion with a massive boundary wall and small, high windows for three months. The letting agent, Mr. Carnford, notes that it has lain empty for some time due to an "absurd prejudice". Mrs. Witham, the landlady of The Good Traveller, is alarmed to hear Malcolmson intends to stay in "the Judge's House", which she tells him was, 100 years prior, the home of a judge who was feared due to his harsh sentences.

At eleven o'clock on his first night in the mansion, Malcolmson notes that the rats behind the wainscoting are unusually noisy. Later that night, he is interrupted from his studies by an enormous rat with "baleful eyes" that perches on an armchair by the fireplace. After Malcolmson attempts to strike it with a poker, the rat flees up the rope of the alarm bell. Visiting Witham the next day, Malcolmson tells her about the rat; he is amused when she suggests it was "the old devil".

On the second evening, Malcolmson is once again disturbed by the noise of the rats. After the rats abruptly fall silent, he once again sees the enormous rat sitting on the chair. After he throws a book of logarithms at it, it once again retreats up the alarm bell rope. Adjusting the rope to create a "rat-trap", Malcolmson notes that it is unusually pliable, thinking "You could hang a man with it". After the rat returns, Malcolmson throws several books at it, the last of which hits it; the rat evades his trap and flees behind a painting. He is unsettled to find that the book that struck the rat was his mother's Bible.

The next day, Malcolmson asks his charwoman, Mrs. Dempster, to clean the painting behind which the rat fled. Visiting The Good Traveller, he is introduced to Dr. Thornhill, who advises him to "give up the tea and the very late hours". After Malcolmson recounts his experiences, Thornhill tells him that the rope of the alarm bell was the rope that the judge's hangman used. After Malcolmson leaves, Thornhill tells Witham that he fears Malcolmson may "get in the night some strange fright or hallucination" and speculates that "possibly—nay, more probably—we shall hear the great alarm bell from the Judge's House tonight"

That night, a heavy wind outside the mansion produces "strange, unearthly sounds", with the alarm bell rope twitching. Watching the rope, Malcolmson sees the enormous rat once again climb down it; seeing him move, it retreats. Examining the painting that Dempster cleaned, Malcolmson sees it is a portrait of the judge - whose eyes "were of peculiar brilliance and with a terribly malignant expression", resembling those of the enormous rat - sitting on the armchair by the fire in the very room in which Malcolmson is staying.

As Malcolmson continues his studies, the storm rages outside. Hearing a squeaking noise, Malcolmson observes the enormous rat chew through the alarm bell rope, which falls to the ground. Rising to chase the rat, Malcolmson notices to his shock that the judge has vanished from the portrait. Turning to the armchair, he sees the judge sitting there. As the clock strikes midnight, the judge dons a black cap. Rising from his chair, the judge knots the rope into a noose, then begins attempting to throw it over Malcolmson's head. Eventually, the judge approaches Malcolmson - who is paralysed by his presence – places the rope over his neck, lifts him onto the armchair, ties the rope to the alarm bell, and then pulls the armchair away.

Hearing the mansion's alarm bell ring, a crowd force their way in. They find "there at the end of the rope of the great alarm bell hung the body of the student, and on the face of the Judge in the picture was a malignant smile."

== Publication ==
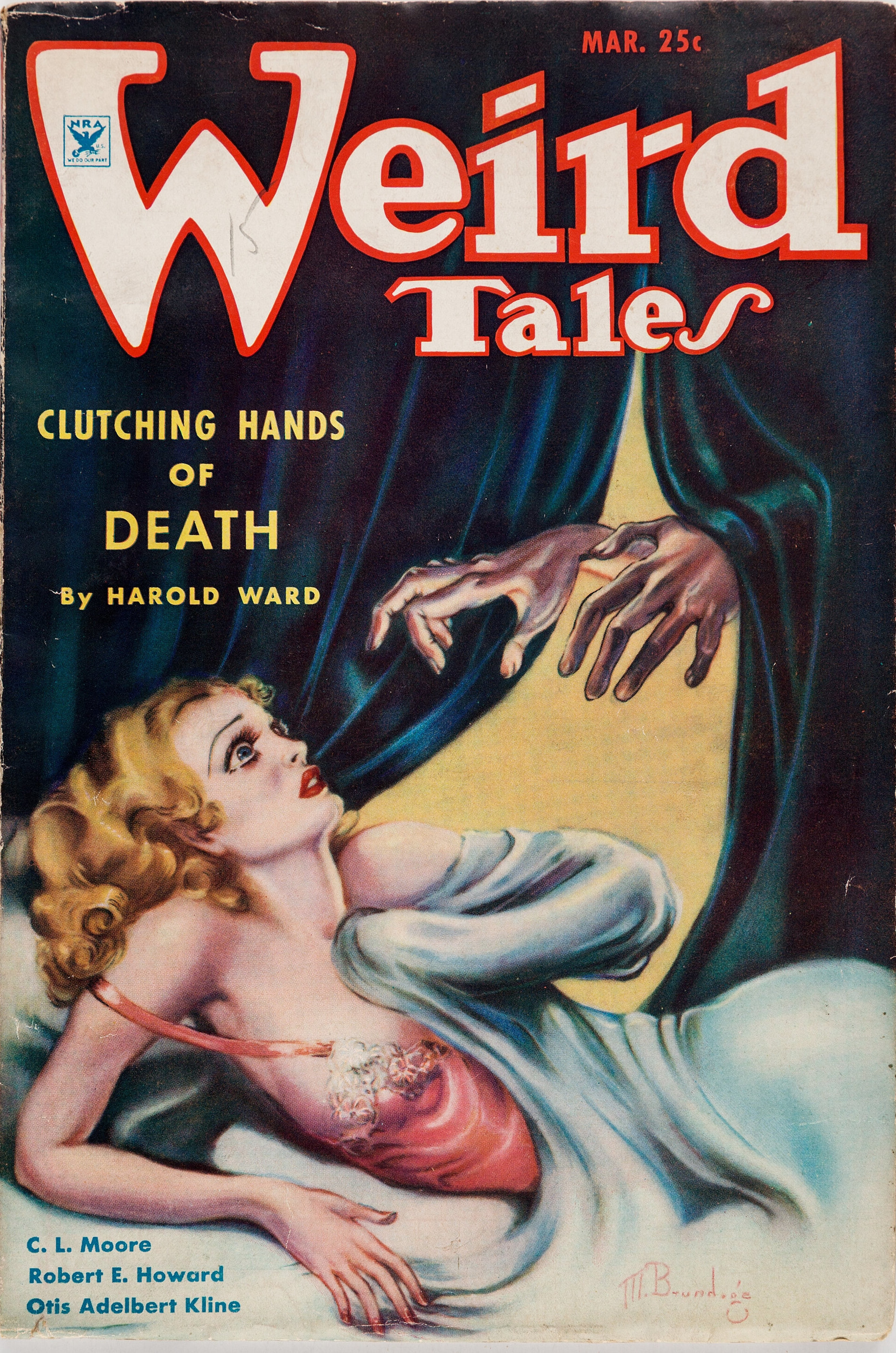
"The Judge's House" was reprinted in volume 25, number 3 of Weird Tales In March 1935

"The Judge's House" was first published in Holly Leaves, the Christmas edition of the Illustrated Sporting and Dramatic News, on 5 December 1891. In 1914, it was collected in Stoker's posthumous book Dracula's Guest and Other Weird Stories. In March 1935, it was published in volume 25, number 3 of Weird Tales. It has been anthologised many times, including in The Second Pan Book of Horror Stories in 1960.

== Reception ==
Describing "The Judge's House" as "chilling", David Stuart Davies compares it to the 1851 Sheridan Le Fanu story "An Account of Some Strange Disturbances in Aungier Street", but contrasts its "direct visceral force" and "modern theatricality" with Le Fanu's story's "charm and gentle chill". Andrew Maunder describes the story as having a "predictable ending" but with "a memorable dimension of horror", comparing it to Le Fanu's 1872 story "Mr. Justice Harbottle".

Writing for Reactor, Ruthanna Emrys states, "The final confrontation between Malcolm and the judge is genuinely chilling. However, Stoker also has no shame about driving a story through pure plot force, plus a protagonist who dives head first into a ball pit full of idiot balls." Anne M. Pillsworth states "Instead of cramming all the standard scare tropes into a small space, thus diffusing their impact, it focuses on three: the perpetrator of evil in life whose sheer malevolence survives death; the avatars of that survival, here the giant rat and the portrait that won't stay put on canvas; and the rationalist overwhelmed by that which his philosophy dreams not of (innocent/amiable subtype.)" Anna S. Berger offers "The Judge's House" as an example of fiction in which "men's ability to employ a rational mindset is presented as arrogant and ultimately self-destructive".

Carol Senf describes "The Judge's House" as "a particularly good example of the Gothic" with staples such as "rats, portraits and an old house", noting that it "juxtaposes the Gothic with ordinary reality and makes it difficult to determine whether the protagonist is insane or haunted by something supernatural" and "use[s] Gothic fiction to examine legitimate social power".

== Adaptations ==
On 26 May 1926, a reading of "The Judge's House" appeared on the radio programme Ghost Programme on 2LO.

On 28 February 1949, an adaptation of "The Judge's House" arranged by John Keir Cross aired on the BBC Light Programme show The Man in Black. It starred Hugh Burden as Malcolm Malcolmson, Howieson Culff as Mr. Carnford, and Gladys Young as Mrs. Dempster.

On 25 September 1981, a radio drama adaptation of the story written by Bob Juhren and starring Gordon Gould and Lloyd Battista aired on CBS Radio Mystery Theater.

In January 1982, a radio play adaptation of "The Judge's House" dramatised by Patricia Mays and directed by Derek Hoddinott aired on the BBC World Service. It starred Nigel Havers as Malcolmson and Jane Thompson as Mrs. Witham.

On 9 April 1989, an adaptation of "The Judge's House" aired on the Fear on Four programme BBC Radio 4. Dramatised by John Keir Cross, directed by Gerry Jones, and presented by Edward de Souza, it featured David Timson as Malcolm, Tessa Worsley as Mrs. Dempster, and Norman Bird as Carnford.

In 1999, the story was adapted by Carla Jablonski into a Wishbone story, "No Noose Is Good News", that was published in the short story collection Tails of Terror.

In 2018, "The Judge's House" was included in an adaptation of The Second Pan Book of Horror Stories by Anita Sullivan for BBC Radio 4 Extra. Directed by Karen Rose, the segment featured Luke Thompson as Malcolmson, Pippa Haywood as Mrs. Witham, and Kathryn Drysdale as Dempster.

In October 2024, Neu Noir Theatre staged a theatrical adaptation of "The Judge's House" starring Richard Usher.

== Sources ==
- Hughes, William. Beyond Dracula: Bram Stoker’s Fiction and Its Cultural Context. Springer Nature, 2000.
- Senf, Carol A., ed. The Critical Introduction to Bram Stoker. Westport, Connecticut: Greenwood Publishing Group, 1993.
- Shepherd, Mike. When Brave Men Shudder: The Scottish Origins of Dracula. Newcastle upon Tyne: Wild Wolf Publishing, 2018.
- Stoker, Bram. Dracula's Guest and Other Weird Stories. Edited by, and with an introduction and notes by, Kate Hebblethwaite. London: Penguin Books, 2006.
- Stoker, Bram. The Bram Stoker Bedside Companion: Stories of Fantasy and Horror. Edited by, and with an introduction, by Charles Osborne. London: Victor Gollancz Ltd, 1973.
- Stoker, Bram. Best Ghost and Horror Stories. Edited by, and with an introduction by, Richard Dalby. New York City: Dover Publications, 1997.
