= The Squaw =

- Short story by Bram Stoker
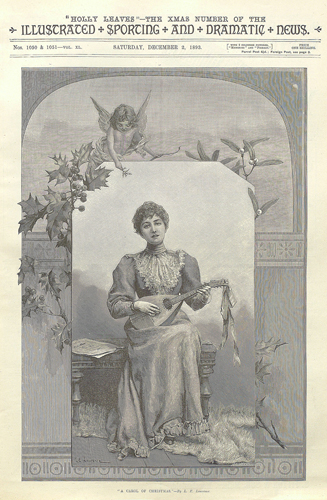
- "The Squaw" was first published in Holly Leaves, the Christmas edition of the Illustrated Sporting and Dramatic News, on 2 December 1893.

Text available at Wikisource
- Country: United Kingdom
- Language: English
- Genre: Horror

Publication
- Published in: Holly Leaves
- Media type: Print
- Publication date: 2 December 1893

"The Squaw" is a horror short story by the Irish writer Bram Stoker, first published in Holly Leaves, the Christmas edition of the Illustrated Sporting and Dramatic News, on 2 December 1893.

The theme of the story is about the vengeance that both humans and animals take when they are harmed or wronged.

== Plot summary ==
The narrator and his wife Amelia are honeymooning in Bavaria, Germany, where they befriend the American tourist Elias P. Hutcheson. While visiting Nuremberg Castle, they look down from the moat wall to see a cat playing with its kitten at the foot of the wall. Elias drops a pebble in an attempt to surprise the cats, but accidentally hits the kitten in the head, killing it. The cat looks up at Elias, appearing to the narrator as "the perfect incarnation of hate", and attempts to climb the wall to reach him. Elias compares the cat to an "Apache squaw" who tortured to death a man, "Splinters", who had harmed her baby, being in turn killed by Elias. As the trio continue their tour of the castle, they see the cat following them along the moat; Amelia is alarmed, but Elias is amused.

Visiting the Castle's eerie "Torture Tower", the trio see the "Iron Virgin", an iron maiden device. The heavy spiked door of the Iron Virgin can be held open by pulling on a rope; it is "...of manifest purpose hung so as to throw its weight downwards, so that it might shut of its own accord when the strain was released". Elias rashly decides to "...get in that box a minute jest to see how it feels". At Elias' insistence, the elderly custodian ties him up and begins to release the door so that Elias can "...feel the same pleasure as the other jays had when those spikes began to move toward their eyes!"

As the custodian slowly releases the door, the narrator is alarmed to see the cat in the room. The cat leaps at the face of the custodian, causing him to release the rope holding the door open. Before the narrator can catch the rope, the spiked door slams shut, impaling and instantly killing Elias. The narrator carries Amelia out of the room, then returns to see the cat licking the blood from Elias' corpse; seizing an old executioner's sword, the narrator cleaves the cat in half.

== Publication ==
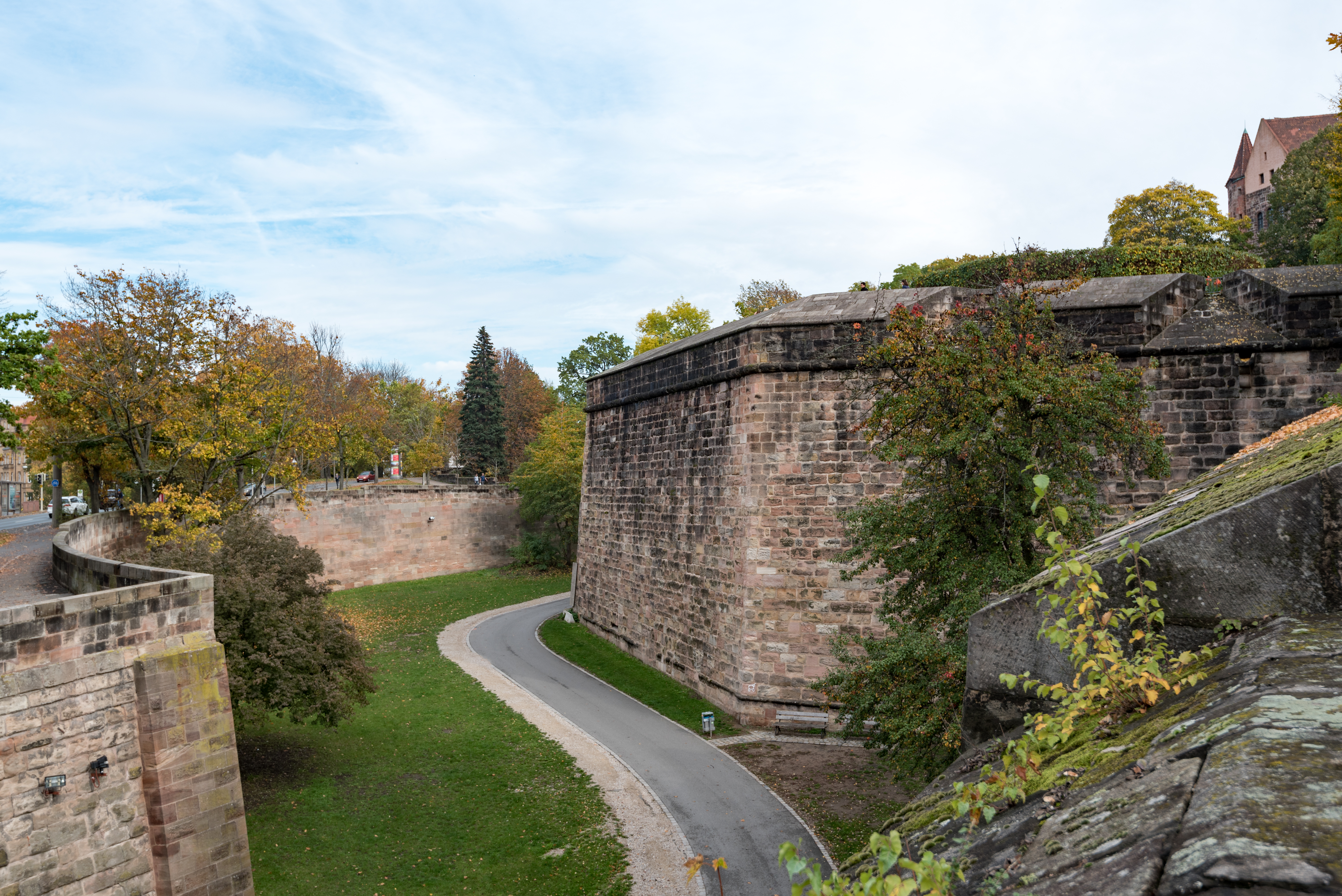
"The Squaw" takes place in Nuremberg Castle

"The Squaw" was first published in Holly Leaves, the Christmas edition of the Illustrated Sporting and Dramatic News, on 2 December 1893. In 1914, it was collected in Stoker's posthumous book Dracula's Guest and Other Weird Stories. In October 1966, it was reprinted in the men's magazine Gent under the title "The Texan & the Iron Virgin". It has been anthologised many times, including in The Pan Book of Horror Stories in 1959.

== Reception and analysis ==
Carol Senf suggests that the story "...reveals the power of the natural world and demonstrates that human beings do not control their destiny". Senf describes the story as "...Gothic, full of the violence and mystery that characterizes the least subtle forms of the genre, including the power of nature and the impact of the past over the present." Senf further states that "The Squaw" "...addresses the American temperament and the importance of technology".

Sarah Williams describes "The Squaw" as "...a typically lurid example of [Stoker's] writing" that features "...the Gothic scenario of the return of the vengeful maternal gaze through the vessel of a cat, the birthmark and the maternal womb/tomb..."

== Adaptations ==
In 1950, "The Squaw" was adapted into a story in issue #8 of the comic book The Haunt of Fear written by Al Feldstein and Bill Gaines and illustrated by Jack Davis under the title "The Irony of Death!".

In 1964, a radio adaptation of "The Squaw" was broadcast as part of the KPFA/KPFK programme The Black Mass.

In 1966, "The Squaw" was adapted into a story in issue #13 of the comic book Creepy written by Archie Goodwin and illustrated by Reed Crandall under the title "The Squaw!".

On 19 December 1973, a radio adaptation of "The Squaw" by Richard Davis titled "Cat's Cradle" starring Kenneth J. Warren was broadcast as part of the BBC Radio 2 programme The Price of Fear.

In 1990, an abridged reading of "The Squaw" by Dyfed Thomas aired on BBC Radio 4.

== Sources ==
- Corstorphine, Kevin. "Stoker, Poe, and American Gothic in 'The Squaw'." Bram Stoker and the Gothic: Formations to Transformations. London: Palgrave Macmillan, 2016, pp. 48-62.
- Hughes, William. Beyond Dracula: Bram Stoker’s Fiction and Its Cultural Context. Springer Nature, 2000.
- Nayder, Lillian. "Virgin Territory and the Iron Virgin: Engendering the Empire in Bram Stoker's 'The Squaw'." Maternal Instincts: Visions of Motherhood and Sexuality in Britain, 1875–1925. London: Palgrave Macmillan, 1997 pp. 75-97.
- Senf, Carol A., ed. The Critical Introduction to Bram Stoker. Westport, Connecticut: Greenwood Press, 1993.
- Pacheco, Vincent. "Animality and Entanglement: The Gothicized 'anthropological machine' in Bram Stoker's short fiction." Rupkatha Journal on Interdisciplinary Studies in Humanities 13.3 (2021).
- Shepherd, Mike. When Brave Men Shudder: The Scottish Origins of Dracula. Newcastle upon Tyne: Wild Wolf Publishing, 2018.
- Stoker, Bram. Dracula's Guest and Other Weird Stories: With The Lair of the White Worm. Edited with an Introduction and Notes by Kate Hebblethwaite. London: Penguin Books, 2006.
- Stoker, Bram. The Bram Stoker Bedside Companion: Stories of fantasy and horror. Edited and with an Introduction by Charles Osborne. London: Victor Gollancz Ltd, 1973.
- Williams, Sara. "The Imprint of the Mother: Bram Stoker's 'The Squaw' and The Jewel of Seven Stars." Bram Stoker and the Gothic: Formations to Transformations. London: Palgrave Macmillan, 2016, pp. 118-137.
- Williams, Sara. "The Gothic and Maternal Gaze Symbolism in the Works of JS Le Fanu and Bram Stoker." The Maternal Gaze in the Gothic. Cham: Springer Nature, 2025, pp. 23-58.
