= Herbert van Thal =

British bookseller, publisher, agent, biographer, and anthologist

Bertie Maurice van Thal (1904–1983), known as Herbert van Thal, was a British bookseller, publisher, agent, biographer, and anthologist.

== Biography ==
Van Thal's grandfather was a distiller (King's Liqueur Whisky), and was a director of the theatre proprietors, Howard and Wyndham. Henry Irving and Harry Lauder were friends of the family.

After the Second World War, he founded the short-lived publishing house of Home and van Thal, with his friends Margaret Douglas-Home and Gwylim Fielden Hughes. The house was known as a "mushroom" publisher, since it sprang up overnight after the war. In about 1952 Home and Van Thal was absorbed by the Arthur Barker publishing firm and Van Thal then worked as manager and editor of the latter firm. Later he became a general editor of the Doughty Library published by Anthony Blond.

Van Thal was a friend and publisher of the critic James Agate, whom he met in 1932. He had been impressed by Agate's review of Wycherley's The Country Wife. Agate once described him as looking like "a sleek, well-groomed dormouse" out of a John Tenniel illustration of Alice in Wonderland, due to Bertie's tendency to dress in a dapper suit, bow tie, monocle, and black shiny shoes.

He had deep familiarity with Victorian literature, opera, and Restoration dramatists. He was one of the first publishers to recognize the talent of Hermann Hesse, and reprinted novels by George Gissing and Theodore Hook. He also edited the reminiscences of Thomas Adolphus Trollope.

He was a prolific editor of anthologies of detective and horror stories; the Pan Book of Horror Stories series ran to 24 volumes, from 1959 to 1983. He edited a biographical anthology of Hilaire Belloc in 1970 and one of Walter Savage Landor in 1973, and edited the papers of famous music-critic Ernest Newman.
