= Appointment with Fear (radio) =

BBC radio horror series (1943–1955)

Appointment with Fear is a horror drama series originally broadcast on BBC Radio in the 1940s and 1950s, and revived on a number of occasions since. The format comprised a dramatised horror story of approximately half an hour in length, introduced by a character known as "The Man in Black". The plays themselves were a mixture of classic horror stories by writers such as Edgar Allan Poe, M. R. James and W. W. Jacobs, and commissioned stories by new or established writers. Many of the stories in the early series were written or adapted by John Dickson Carr, a number of which had already been produced for the American CBS series Suspense; and, in addition to its primary author, Appointment With Fear also shared the theme music and the narrator character of The Man in Black with Suspense.

== Appointment with Fear (1943-1955 and 1976) ==
Appointment with Fear ran for nine series between 1943 and 1955, initially on the BBC Home Service and from September 1945 on the Light Programme. The Man in Black was played by the British character actor Valentine Dyall, except in the second series where the character was portrayed by Dyall's father Franklin Dyall. Only four episodes are known to survive, three from Series 3 (“The Pit and the Pendulum”, “The Speaking Clock”, “The Clock Strikes Eight”) and one from Series 6 (“And the Deep Shuddered”). A tenth series was broadcast on the BBC World Service in 1976.

=== Series 1 ===
- 'Cabin B13' by John Dickson Carr. 11 September 1943
- 'The Pit And The Pendulum', adapted by John Dickson Carr from Edgar Allan Poe, 18 September 1943
- 'Into Thin Air' by John Dickson Carr, 21 September 1943
- 'The Body Snatchers' adapted by John Dickson Carr from Robert Louis Stevenson, 30 September 1943
- 'The Customers Like Murder' by John Dickson Carr, 7 October 1943
- 'Will You Make a Bet With Death?' by John Dickson Carr, 14 October 1943
- 'The Devil's Saint' by John Dickson Carr, 21 October 1943
- 'Fire Burn and Cauldron Bubble' by John Dickson Carr, 28 October 1943
- 'The Phantom Archer' by John Dickson Carr, 4 November 1943
- 'The Man Who Died Twice' by John Dickson Carr, 11 November 1943
- 'Menace In Wax' by John Dickson Carr, 18 November 1943

=== Series 2 ===
- 'Vex Not His Ghost' by John Dickson Carr, 6 January 1944
- 'The Tell Tale Heart' adapted by John Dickson Carr from Edgar Allan Poe, 13 January 1944
- 'The Room of the Suicides' by John Dickson Carr, 20 January 1944
- 'The Sire de Maletroit's Door' adapted by John Dickson Carr from Robert Louis Stevenson, 27 January 1944
- 'The Dragon in the Pool' by John Dickson Carr, 3 February 1944
- 'The Man Who Was Afraid of Dentists' by John Dickson Carr, 10 February 1944

=== Series 3 ===
- 'The Speaking Clock' by John Dickson Carr, 13 April 1944
- 'Death Flies Blind' by John Dickson Carr, 20 April 1944
- 'A Watcher by the Dead' adapted by John Dickson Carr from Ambrose Bierce, 27 April 1944
- 'The Pit and the Pendulum' adapted by John Dickson Carr from Edgar Allan Poe, 4 May 1944
- 'Vampire Tower' by John Dickson Carr, 11 May 1944
- 'The Clock Strikes Eight' by John Dickson Carr, 18 May 1944

=== Series 4 ===
- 'I Never Suspected' by John Dickson Carr, 5 October 1944
- 'The Devil's Manuscript' by John Dickson Carr, 12 October 1944
- 'Death Has Four Faces' by John Dickson Carr, 19 October 1944
- 'The Purple Wig' adapted by John Dickson Carr from G K Chesterton, 26 October 1944
- 'He Who Whispers' by John Dickson Carr, 2 November 1944
- 'The Great Cipher' adapted by John Dickson Carr, from Melville Davisson Post, 16 November 1944
- 'Vex Not His Ghost' by John Dickson Carr, 30 November 1944
- 'The Curse of the Bronze Lamp' by John Dickson Carr, 7 December 1944
- 'The Gong Cried Murder' by John Dickson Carr, 14 December 1944
- 'Lair of the Devil Fish' by John Dickson Carr, 21 December 1944
- 'The Oath of Rolling Thunder' by John Dickson Carr, 28 December 1944

=== Series 5 ===
- 'Into Thin Air' by John Dickson Carr, 11 September 1945
- 'Fire Burn and Cauldron Bubble' by John Dickson Carr, 18 September 1945
- 'The Man Who Died Twice' by John Dickson Carr, 25 September 1945
- 'The Clock Strikes Eight' by John Dickson Carr, 2 October 1945
- 'Cabin B13' by John Dickson Carr, 9 October 1945
- 'Will You Make a Bet With Death?' by John Dickson Carr, 16 October 1945

=== Series 6 ===
- 'He Wasn't Superstitious' adapted by John Dickson Carr from Ambrose Bierce, 23 October 1945
- 'The Man With Two Heads' by John Dickson Carr, 6 November 1945
- 'The Case of the Five Canaries' by John Dickson Carr, 13 November 1945
- 'And The Deep Shuddered' by Monckton Hoffe, 20 November 1945
- 'The Case' by John Slater and Roy Plomley, 27 November 1945
- 'Death at Midnight' by Robert Barr, 4 December 1945

=== Series 7 ===
- 'The Nutcracker Suite' by E Crowshay-Williams and J Leslie Dodd, 26 March 1946
- 'Black Mamba' by Hugh Barnes and AR Ramsden, 2 April 1946
- 'The Cask of Amontillado' adapted by Laidman Browne from Edgar Allan Poe, 9 April 1946
- 'A Watcher by the Dead' adapted by John Dickson Carr from Ambrose Bierce, 16 April 1946
- 'The Man Who Knew How' adapted by Ronald Cunliffe from Dorothy L Sayers, 23 April 1946
- 'Dead Men's Teeth' by Charles Hatton and Richard Fisher, 30 April 1946
- 'Experiment With Death' by Harry Bunton, 7 May 1946
- 'Death Takes a Honeymoon' by Mileson Horton and WL Catchpole, 14 May 1946
- 'Renovations at Merrets' adapted by Rankine Good from Honoré de Balzac, 21 May 1946
- 'The Monkey's Paw' adapted by Louis N Parker from WW Jacobs, 28 May 1946
- 'Cottage For Sale' by TJ Waldron, 4 June 1946
- 'A Mind in Shadow' by Kenneth Morgan, 11 June 1946

=== Special ===
- 'Escape to Death' by Mileson Horton, 25 December 1946

=== Series 8 ===
- 'Mrs Amworth' adapted by Charles Hatton from EF Benson, 25 February 1947
- 'Sink or Swim Together' by ???, 4 March 1947
- 'The Last Pilgrimage' by TJ Waldron, 11 March 1947
- 'The Bell Room' adapted by Lester Powell from Edgar Allan Poe, 25 March 1947
- 'The Diary of William Carpenter' adapted by Patric Dickinson from John Atkins, 1 April 1947
- 'The Treasures' adapted by Charles Hatton from Gilbert Frankau, 8 April 1947
- 'The Hands of Nekamen' adapted by Lester Powell from Kathleen Hyett, 22 April 1947
- 'All Cats May Snarl' by J Vernon Basley, 29 April 1947

=== Special ===
- 'The Clock Strikes Eight' by John Dickson Carr, 14 January 1948

=== Special ===
- 'The Diary of William Carpenter' adapted by Patric Dickinson from John Atkins, 23 January 1948

=== Series 9 ===
- 'The Man Who Couldn't Be Photographed' by John Dickson Carr, 23 July 1955
- 'White Tiger Passage' by John Dickson Carr, 2 August 1955
- 'The Dead Man's Knock' by John Dickson Carr, 9 August 1955
- 'The Sleuth of Seven Dials' by John Dickson Carr, 16 August 1955
- 'The Villa of the Damned' by John Dickson Carr, 23 August 1955
- 'Till the Great Armadas Come' by John Dickson Carr, 30 August 1955

=== Series 10 ===
There was no tenth series in 1957, it was merely a repeat broadcast of Series Nine.

=== Tie-In Publication ===
- Appointment with Fear(Fenmore Publications, 1948. Ed. Ronald Flatteau
  - Death Takes a Honeymoon by Mileson Horton
  - Watcher by the Dead by Ambrose Bierce
  - The Monkey’s Paw by WW Jacobs
  - The Pit and the Pendulum by Edgar Allan Poe
  - A Mind in Shadow by Kenneth Morgan
  - Berenice by Edgar Allan Poe

== The Man in Black (1949) ==
The Man in Black was broadcast for one series of eight episodes in 1949, also on the Light Programme, and again presented by Valentine Dyall in the title role. No episodes are known to have survived.

- 'Markheim,' adapted by John Keir Cross from Robert Louis Stevenson, 31 January 1949
- 'Oh, Whistle and I'll Come to You, My Lad,' adapted by John Keir Cross from MR James, 7 February 1949
- 'The Middle Toe of The Right Foot,' adapted by John Keir Cross from Ambrose Bierce, 14 February 1949
- 'Our Feathered Friends,' adapted by John Keir Cross from Philip Macdonald and 'Thus I Refute Beelzy' adapted by John Keir Cross from John Collier, 21 February 1949
- 'The Judge's House,' adapted by John Keir Cross from "The Judge's House" by Bram Stoker, 28 February 1949
- 'The Yellow Wallpaper,’ adapted by John Keir Cross from Charlotte Perkins Gilman, 7 March 1949
- 'The Beast With Five Fingers,’ adapted by John Keir Cross from W. F. Harvey, 14 March 1949
- 'The Little House,’ adapted by John Keir Cross, 21 March 1949

== Fear on Four (1988) ==
Fear on Four ran for five series on BBC Radio 4 between 1988 and 1992, the part of the Man in Black being played by Edward de Souza. A fifth series was broadcast in 1997, this time without a narrator. An anthology of stories from the first two series was published by BBC Books in 1990.

=== Series One ===
- The Snowman Killing by J. C. W. Brook, 3 January 1988
- William and Mary by Roald Dahl, dramatised by Jill Brooke, 10 January 1988
- The Monkey's Paw by W. W. Jacobs, adapted by Patrick Galvin, 17 January 1988
- Music Lovers by Nick Warburton, 24 January 1988
- The Beast with Five Fingers by W. F. Harvey, dramatised by John Kier Cross, 31 January 1988
- Every Detail but One by Bert Coules, 7 February 1988
- By the River, Fontainebleau by Stephen Gallagher, 14 February 1988
- The Face by E. F. Benson, dramatised by Michael Bakewell, 21 February 1988
- Mind Well the Tree by William Ingram, 28 February 1988
- Fat Andy by Stephen Dunstone, 6 March 1988
- A Day at the Dentist's by James Saunders, based on an idea by Arch Oboler, 13 March 1988
- The Speciality of the House by Stanley Ellin, dramatised by Colin Haydn Evans, 20 March 1988

=== Series Two ===
- Snipe 3909 by Graeme Fife, 15 January 1989
- The Dead Drummer by David Buck, 22 January 1989
- The Dispossessed Daughter by Katherine Nicholas, 29 January 1989
- St Austin Friars by Stephen Wyatt, adapted from a short story by Robert Westall, 5 February 1989
- Dreaming of Thee by Gwen Cherrell, 12 February 1989
- The Horn by Stephen Gallagher, 19 February 1989
- The Journey Home by Bert Coules, 26 February 1989
- Hand in Glove by Elizabeth Bowen
- His Last Card by Nick Warburton
- Survival by John Wyndham, dramatised by Pat Hooker
- Soul Searching by Martyn Wade
- A Child Crying by James Saunders
- The Judge's House by Bram Stoker, April 1989

=== Series Three ===
- The Yellow Wallpaper
- Green and Pleasant
- The Monkey's Revenge
- Invitation to the Vaults by Basil Copper, January 1991
- The Edge
- Dead Man's Boots
- A Routine Operation?
- Dance in the Underworld

=== Series Four ===
- Gobble, Gobble
- The Next in Line by Ray Bradbury dramatised by Brian Sibley
- Dark Feathers
- Playing God
- Vicious Fish
- Hellhound on My Trail
- Hearing is Believing
- Life Line

=== Series Five ===
- The Blood of Eva Bergen
- Net Suicide
- Tissue Memory
- Chimes at Midnight

== The Man in Black (2009) ==
The series was revived again in 2009, on BBC Radio 4 Extra, this time as The Man in Black, with Mark Gatiss in the title role. It ran for four series, each with five episodes, between 2009 and 2011.

Reruns of the 2009 version started to air on BBC Radio 4 Extra on April 24, 2020.

=== Series One ===
- The Tower
- Project Purple
- The White Hare
- Hide and Seek
- Bombers' Moon

=== Series Two ===
- Phish Phood
- Death Us Do Part
- Flesh
- Angels in Disguise
- The Old Road

=== Series Three ===
- Connect
- The Printed Name
- Lights Out
- Uncle William's House
- Perfect Home

=== Series Four ===
- Containment
- The Punt
- The Beaten Track
- Reunion
- The New Boy

== Film adaptation ==
In 1950, Hammer and Exclusive Films released a feature film based on the series entitled The Man in Black. The stars were Betty Ann Davies, Sheila Burrell, and Sid James, with Valentine Dyall reprising his role as the Man in Black.
