= J. C. W. Brook =

British radio dramatist

James C. W. Brook was a radio dramatist who was active during the 1970s and 1980s. Radio drama enthusiasts regard his work very highly, and his plays "Jonas", "The Doppelganger" and "The Missing Piece" are regarded as radio classics.

Jonas, The Doppelganger, The Tale of the Knight, the Witch and the Dragon, A Dream of Murder, Blop and The Best of Friends were broadcast on BBC Radio.
