= List of Wishbone books =

This is a list of children's books based on the TV series Wishbone. All were published by the series' producer, Lyrick Studios, under the imprint name Big Red Chair Books.

== Wishbone Classics ==
The Wishbone Classics series features straightforward adaptations of the original stories that inspired episodes of the show, albeit with humorous commentary from Wishbone inserted in sidebars.

Number	Title	Original author	Retold by	First printed	Related episode(s)
#1	Don Quixote	Miguel de Cervantes	Michael Burgen	March 1996	11. "The Impawssible Dream"
#2	The Odyssey	Homer	Joanne Mattern	March 1996	5. "Homer Sweet Homer"
#3	Romeo and Juliet	William Shakespeare	Billy Aronson	April 1996	4. "Rosie, Oh! Rosie, Oh!"
#4	Joan of Arc	Mark Twain	Patrice Selene	June 1996	10. "Bone of Arc"
#5	Oliver Twist	Charles Dickens	Joanne Mattern	July 1996	3. "Twisted Tail"
#6	The Adventures of Robin Hood	Anonymous	Joanne Mattern	July 1996	24. "Paw Prints of Thieves"
#7	Frankenstein	Mary Shelley	Michael Burgen	September 1996	17. "Frankenbone"
#8	The Strange Case of Dr. Jekyll and Mr. Hyde	Robert Louis Stevenson	Joanne Mattern and Ed Parker	September 1996	20. "Mixed Breeds"
#9	A Journey to the Center of the Earth	Jules Verne	Billy Aronson	October 1996	18. "Hot Diggity Dawg"
#10	The Red Badge of Courage	Stephen Crane	Michael Burgan	December 1996	31. "A Terrified Terrier"
#11	The Adventures of Tom Sawyer	Mark Twain	Stephen Fuentes	December 1996	1.–2. "A Tail in Twain"
#12	Ivanhoe	Sir Walter Scott	Joanne Mattern	January 1997	13. "Sniffing the Gauntlet"

== The Adventures of Wishbone ==
The Adventures of Wishbone follows the structure of the TV series, switching back and forth between Oakdale and a story of which Wishbone has been reminded. Several are novelizations of television episodes, while others adapt stories not featured in the TV series.

Number	Title	Author	Inspired by	Wishbone's story role	First printed	Adapted episode
#1	Be a Wolf!	Brad Strickland	Beowulf	Beowulf	June 1997	—N/a
When Joe's backpack is confiscated by a neighbor with a big and supposedly very mean dog, Wishbone is reminded of the story of a warrior who had to summon up the courage to face off with a real monster.
#2	Salty Dog	Brad Strickland	Treasure Island by Robert Louis Stevenson	Jim Hawkins	June 1997	28. "Salty Dog"
Samantha convinces the boys to help her look for "Blackbeard's Horseshoe" inside a condemned barn, reminding Wishbone of another famous search for buried treasure.
#3	The Prince and the Pooch	Caroline Leavitt	The Prince and the Pauper by Mark Twain	Tom Canty and King Edward VI	July 1997	26. "The Prince and the Pooch"
Believing he would be just as good at coaching as he is at playing, Joe tries to coach a tee-ball team that includes Emily and Tina, reminding Wishbone of the story of two boys who suddenly found themselves living life opposite from what they are used to.
#4	Robinhound Crusoe	Caroline Leavitt	Robinson Crusoe by Daniel Defoe	Robinson Crusoe	August 1997	—N/a
A blackout means Joe and Wishbone must travel across town in the dark, reminding Wishbone of the story of another young man who was pitted against the forces of nature.
#5	Hunchdog of Notre Dame	Michael Jan Friedman	The Hunchback of Notre-Dame by Victor Hugo	Quasimodo	September 1997	14. "The Hunchdog of Notre Dame"
Sam befriends and assists the clumsy Nathaniel Bobelesky, and her desire to help the boy despite his differences (and the jealousy of Joe and David) reminds Wishbone of Esmeralda's helping the hunchback Quasimodo.
#6	Digging Up the Past	Vivian Sathre	Rip Van Winkle by Washington Irving	Rip Van Winkle	October 1997	9. "Digging Up the Past"
Wishbone and the kids meet Dr. Thelma Brown, an elderly woman who lived in Joe's house as a child, and help dig up a time capsule she once buried. Meanwhile, Dr. Brown's return to a place that has changed in the many years since she was last there reminds Wishbone of the story of Rip Van Winkle.
#7	The Mutt in the Iron Muzzle	Michael Jan Friedman	The Man in the Iron Mask by Alexandre Dumas	Philippe	November 1997	—N/a
Damont Jones is running for class president, and will do anything to keep Joe from running against him. This reminds Wishbone of the story of a prince who would do anything to keep his rival to the throne from claiming it.
#8	Muttketeer!	Bill Crider	The Three Musketeers by Alexandre Dumas	D'Artagnan	December 1997	33. "Muttketeer"
Wishbone tries to join the kids at school, and is reminded of d'Artagnan and his own desire to join a special group.
#9	A Tale of Two Sitters	Joanne Barkan	A Tale of Two Cities by Charles Dickens	Charles Darnay	January 1998	16. "A Tale of Two Sitters"
Joe and David refuse to properly babysit David's little sister Emily and her friend Tina since it would interfere with their plans. Instead, the girls are left alone, where they wreak havoc on the Talbots' home. These events remind Wishbone of the "best of times" and "worst of times" in A Tale of Two Cities.
#10	Moby Dog	Alexander Steele	Moby Dick by Herman Melville	Ishmael	February 1998	—N/a
When someone in a White Whales jacket runs off with Joe's basketball, Wishbone is reminded of another hunt for a white whale.
#11	The Pawloined Paper	Olga Litowinsky	"The Purloined Letter" by Edgar Allan Poe	C. Auguste Dupin	March 1998	22. "The Pawloined Paper"
Joe tries to get back an embarrassing word puzzle he made before anyone sees it, especially Damont, who intends to use it to humiliate him. This reminds Wishbone of a search for another letter that could ruin the recipient's reputation.
#12	Dog Overboard!	Vivian Sathre	Kidnapped by Robert Louis Stevenson	David Balfour	April 1998	—N/a
When a local boy is accused of spray-painting graffiti all over town, Joe is the only one who knows he is innocent. But revealing it (since he was away from home, where he was supposed to be doing his chores) could get them both in trouble, reminding Wishbone of the story of a young man who also got in trouble in the course of his wanderings.
#13	Homer Sweet Homer	Carla Jablonski	The Odyssey by Homer	Odysseus	July 1998	5. "Homer Sweet Homer"
When Wishbone is taken by Emily Barnes, he is reminded of Odysseus's story. Further inspiration comes from his and the kids' quest to save Jackson Park from developers who want to build a shopping center there, destroying a historical oak tree in the process. First appearance of Mr. King and the Suitor Development Corporation.
#14	Dr. Jekyll and Mr. Dog	Nancy Butcher	The Strange Case of Dr. Jekyll and Mr. Hyde by Robert Louis Stevenson	Gabriel John Utterson	June 1998	20. "Mixed Breeds"
Wanda falls for an Elvis impersonator named Lou Dublin, jeopardizing her relationship with Mr. Pruitt. Meanwhile, her sudden turn of behavior reminds Wishbone of another story about a man who suddenly begins acting like a different person.
#15	A Pup in King Arthur's Court	Joanne Barkan	A Connecticut Yankee in King Arthur's Court by Mark Twain	Hank Morgan	September 1998	—N/a
Joe and David decide to use a computer to create a new school newspaper that will put the old one to shame. This battle of new ways over old ones reminds Wishbone of another man who tried to modernize the world when he was transported back in time.
#16	The Last of the Breed	Alexander Steele	The Last of the Mohicans by James Fenimore Cooper	Hawkeye	January 1999	—N/a
Mr. King is once again trying to build on Jackson Park, reminding Wishbone of a classic story about the conflict between humankind and nature.
#17	Digging to the Center of the Earth	Michael Anthony Steele	A Journey to the Center of the Earth by Jules Verne	Professor Otto Lidenbrock	March 1999	18. "Hot Diggity Dawg"
While helping Wanda plant a new tree in her yard, the kids and Wishbone discover half of a very old medal, and set out to find the other half, as well as where its origin. The discovery of a mysterious artifact reminds Wishbone of his Professor Lidenbrock's adventure began.
#18	Gullifur's Travels	Brad Strickland	Gulliver's Travels by Jonathan Swift	Lemuel Gulliver	July 1999	—N/a
Joe's basketball team has two more games to win to make it to the playoffs. But one team's players are shorter than average, while the other's are taller, leading to Joe learning a valuable lesson in judging people by their size while reminding Wishbone of the story of a man who was also faced with two groups of people, one small and one large.
#19	Terrier of the Lost Mines	Brad Strickland	King Solomon's Mines by H. Rider Haggard	Allan Quatermain	November 1999	—N/a
When the kids and Wishbone search for an ancient treasure in Oakdale, Wishbone is reminded of Allan Quatermain and his own hunt for a lost treasure.
#20	Ivanhound	Nancy Holder	Ivanhoe by Sir Walter Scott	Ivanhoe	January 2000	13. "Sniffing the Gauntlet"
After an allergic reaction prevents Sam from going to school on the day of a big spelling bee, David must step up to win it for their team. Meanwhile, the class's division over the spelling bee reminds Wishbone of Ivanhoe and his return to England, only to find it divided between the Saxons and Normans
#21	Huckleberry Dog	Alexander Steele	The Adventures of Huckleberry Finn by Mark Twain	Huckleberry Finn	March 2000	—N/a
When confronted with protecting personal freedom and helping a friend find lost treasure, it reminds Wishbone of the tale of a young boy who tries to escape his unhappy life who befriends a runaway slave.

=== The Super Adventures of Wishbone ===
The Super Adventures of Wishbone consists of five double-length books in the style of The Adventures of Wishbone.

Number	Title	Author	Inspired by	Wishbone's story role	First printed	Adapted episode(s)
#1	Wishbone's Dog Days of the West	Vivian Sathre	Heart of the West by O. Henry ("A Call Loan," "The Reformation of Calliope," "Cupid à la Carte")	"Long Bill" Longley	1998	TV movie: Wishbone's Dog Days of the West
After saving a little girl from a falling beam and being treated like a hero, Wanda has to deal with a sneaky TV reporter who tries to make people view her as a tyrant, reminding Wishbone of the story of a man who also has to deal with a sudden bad reputation.
#2	The Legend of Sleepy Hollow	Carla Jablonski	The Legend of Sleepy Hollow by Washington Irving	Ichabod Crane	October 1998	41.–42. "Halloween Hound"
An encounter with an eerie, abandoned house reminds Wishbone of the setting of one of America's most famous ghost stories.
#3	Unleashed in Space	Alexander Steele	The Legion of Space by Jack Williamson	John Ulnar	May 1999	—N/a
#4	Tails of Terror	various (edited by Kevin Ryan and Pam Pollack)	various		September 1999	—N/a
On Halloween night (following the events of the episode "Halloween Hound"), Wishbone is certain there is a monster afoot. Seeking it out, he is reminded of multiple classic ghost stories. Note: Unlike all other Adventures of Wishbone books, this is not a novel but a cycle of short stories, each by a different author and based on a different ghost story, as follows: "Grrrreen Tea" by Brad Strickland, inspired by "Green Tea" by J. Sheridan Le Fanu; "The Open Doggie Door" by Michael Anthony Steele, inspired by "The Open Door" by Margaret Oliphant; "A New Leash on Life" by Mary Ryan, inspired by The Haunted and the Haunters by Edward Bulwer-Lytton; "A Brush with Terror" by Nancy Holder, inspired by "The Portrait Painter's Story" by Charles Dickens; "Fearful Fetch" by B. B. Calhoun, inspired by "Wandering Willie's Tale" by Sir Walter Scott; "Passenger Pup on the Phantom Coach" by Joanne Barkan, inspired by "The Phantom Coach" by Amelia Edwards; "No Noose Is Good News" by Carla Jablonski, inspired by "The Judge's House" by Bram Stoker; "Guard Dog of Haunted Hall" by Vivian Sathre, inspired by "The Open Door" by Charlotte Riddell
#5	Twenty Thousand Wags Under the Sea	Carla Jablonski	Twenty Thousand Leagues Under the Seas by Jules Verne	Professor Pierre Aronnax	May 2000	—N/a
Wishbone imagines himself as Professor Pierre Aronnax as he discovers Captain Nemo's luxurious and incredible submarine. Along the way, he encounters many dangers and one big adventure.

== The Wishbone Mysteries ==
The Wishbone Mysteries books depart from the structure of the TV series, no longer including Wishbone imagining himself into a story, but exclusively following Wishbone and his human friends in Oakdale. In each book, Joe, Sam, or David reads a novel or short story (usually, but not always, a mystery), with the events of that story inspiring them as they solve a mystery in the present day. In the second book, Joe discovers a box of his late father's favorite mystery stories in their attic, which supplies many of the books he reads throughout the series.

Number	Title	Author	Inspired by	Read by	First printed
#1	The Treasure of Skeleton Reef	Brad Strickland and Thomas E. Fuller	"The Adventure of the Musgrave Ritual" by Sir Arthur Conan Doyle	Joe	November 1997
The old Skeleton Reef Lighthouse in St. George Bay has been donated to the Oakdale Historical Society, and the Talbots and Wanda head down to visit it. Unfortunately, they soon learn they only have a limited time to restore or tear down the building, leading Joe and Wishbone into a search for an ancient treasure that could be the key to saving the lighthouse.
#2	The Haunted Clubhouse	Caroline Leavitt	Ten Little Indians by Agatha Christie	Joe	November 1997
Joe wins an old clubhouse in a raffle, but events soon conspire to make him believe the building is haunted. Meanwhile, he also discovers an old box of his father's favorite mystery books and begins reading them.
#3	Riddle of the Wayward Books	Brad Strickland and Thomas E. Fuller	The Haunted Bookshop by Christopher Morley	Joe	December 1997
When Joe gets a summer job at Mr. Kilgore Gurney's used bookstore, he soon finds himself wrapped up in a mystery as to who is breaking into the store at night, and why.
#4	Tale of the Missing Mascot	Alexander Steele	The Hollow Man by John Dickson Carr	Sam	January 1998
When the head is stolen from the mascot's costume for the Bulldogs, Oakdale's football team, it is up to Wishbone and his friends to solve the case.
#5	The Stolen Trophy	Michael Jan Friedman	Peril at End House by Agatha Christie	Joe	February 1998
Soon after he and his friends (and Damont) make a visit to the home of the new kid in town, Joe discovers that an old basketball trophy has disappeared from the boy's home, and must both find the trophy and determine if the supposed thief is really guilty. Meanwhile, Wishbone encounters and must stand up to a new dog in town who has been stealing things from his golden retriever friend Sparky.
#6	The Maltese Dog	Anne Capeci	The Maltese Falcon by Dashiell Hammett	Joe	March 1998
Someone is playing practical jokes on the basketball team, and when the evidence points to Joe, it is up to Wishbone to clear his name before the pranks affect the team.
#7	Drive-In of Doom	Brad Strickland and Thomas E. Fuller	The Roman Hat Mystery by Ellery Queen	Joe	April 1998
Wanda's friend Gladys Glendower is trying to fix up the old Moonlight Drive-in theater so it can be reopened for business. While helping out with the restoration, Joe and his friends soon discover the theater is being sabotaged to keep it from ever reopening, and become determined to find out who and why.
#8	Key to the Golden Dog	Anne Capeci	The Moonstone by Wilkie Collins	Sam	May 1998
An old model railway set, belonging to a man who has lived in Oakdale almost since it was founded and depicting the town as it was in the early 1900s, goes on display at Pepper Pete's for Oakdale History Month. But when the model's locomotive mysteriously goes missing, Sam and the others must find and recover both the locomotive and a secret it hides, which could also lead to the recovery of a long-lost golden dog charm. Note: The Moonstone was also adapted into a TV episode, "Moonbone," with a different plot.
#9	Case of the On-Line Alien	Alexander Steele	The War of the Worlds by H. G. Wells	David	June 1998
After witnessing an eerie glow in the sky and hearing a strange humming sound in the neighborhood, Wishbone is concerned that aliens might invade earth. Meanwhile, David is invited to speak about the potential existence or nonexistence of extraterrestrial life on a local radio show.
#10	The Disappearing Dinosaurs	Brad Strickland and Thomas E. Fuller	"Silver Blaze" by Sir Arthur Conan Doyle	Sam	July 1998
There is a new dinosaur exhibit at the Oakdale College Museum, including a brand new species that someone wants to make sure is never seen, leading to Joe and his friends setting out to find the culprit.
#11	Lights! Camera! Action Dog!	Kevin Ryan	Time and Again by Jack Finney	Joe	August 1998
Joe is hired for a part in a movie being filmed in Oakdale, but soon winds up searching for the mysterious person sabotaging production.
#12	Forgotten Heroes	Michael Anthony Steele	"The Adventure of the Norwood Builder" by Sir Arthur Conan Doyle	Joe	October 1998
When he buys an old collection of baseball cards, Joe discovers a few involving the Oakdale Oaks, the champions of Oakdale's Negro league. But attempts to find more information lead to dead ends, and the discovery that someone is trying to keep the Oaks' role in Oakdale's history a secret.
#13	Case of the Unsolved Case	Alexander Steele	The Mystery of Edwin Drood by Charles Dickens	All	November 1998
Things are going missing in Oakdale: a ring that belonged to Joe's late father, a rawhide bone of Wishbone's, and most concerning, David Barnes. Joe, Sam and Wishbone quickly set out to find their friend, while drawing parallels to the mystery novel that all of them had recently read.
#14	Disoriented Express	Brad Strickland and Thomas E. Fuller	Murder on the Orient Express by Agatha Christie	Joe	December 1998
Oakdale College is holding a murder-mystery fundraiser on a train, and Joe and his friends are taking part. But in addition to the fake murder, they soon find themselves wrapped up in the case of a long-missing art treasure from World War II.
#15	Stage Invader	Vivian Sathre	Sleeping Murder by Agatha Christie	Sam	February 1999
Sam is in charge of the Sequoyah Middle School eighth grade production of Grease, the first time that students have had full control of a play. However, she and the others soon find themselves involved in the mystery of who is sabotaging the production.
#16	The Sirian Conspiracy	Michael Jan Friedman and Paul Kupperberg	The Assassination Bureau by Jack London	Joe	June 1999
When a mysterious green glow appears over Oakdale for the second time in recent history, U.F.O. fever strikes. Now, Joe and his friends must uncover the truth behind this strange happening, while Wishbone searches for answers about the trouble one of his best canine friends appears to be in.
#17	Case of the Impounded Hounds	Michael Anthony Steele	"The Adventure of the Six Napoleons" by Sir Arthur Conan Doyle	Joe	August 1999
Wishbone and Joe investigate the disappearance of a dog, only to find that many other dogs have vanished in Oakdale.
#18	Phantom of the Video Store	Leticia Gantt	The Phantom of the Opera by Gaston Leroux	Joe	December 1999
Wishbone must discover a mysterious person who is inserting film footage of the people of Oakdale into the video rental movies at the store where Joe works. Note: The Phantom of the Opera was also adapted into a TV episode, "Pantin' at the Opera," with a different plot.
#19	Case of the Cyber-Hacker	Anne Capeci	The Thirty-Nine Steps by John Buchan	David	April 2000
When David is framed for theft by a sneaky computer hacker, he and his friends must track down the real culprit, while Wishbone investigates the case of a dog he believes is being mistreated.
#20	Case of the Breaking Story	Alexander Steele	"The Adventure of the Bruce-Partington Plans" by Sir Arthur Conan Doyle	Joe	August 2000
When a flu epidemic strikes the staff of the Oakdale Chronicle, Joe and Wishbone are called into detective duty as well as serving as the replacement reporters.

=== The Wishbone Super Mysteries ===
Similar to The Super Adventures, The Wishbone Super Mysteries consists of four double-length books in the style of The Wishbone Mysteries.

Number	Title	Author	Inspired by	Read by	First printed
#1	The Halloween Joker	Anne Capeci	Dracula by Bram Stoker	Sam	September 1998
As Halloween approaches, a practical joker targets the kids of Oakdale, and the jokes are starting to get out of hand. It is up to Wishbone and his friends to find out who the joker is before the costume party is ruined.
#2	Ghost of Camp Ka Nowato	Michael Anthony Steele	A Caribbean Mystery by Agatha Christie	Sam	April 1999
Joe, Sam, and David become counselors at a summer camp. However, spooky things arise, and it is up to them, with the help of Wishbone to find out what is really going on.
#3	The Haunting of Hathaway House	Alexander Steele	The House of the Seven Gables by Nathaniel Hawthorne	Sam	October 1999
When Wanda inherits an old, seemingly haunted house in New Hampshire, she, the kids and Wishbone must uncover the truth behind the mysterious events happening there.
#4	Riddle of the Lost Lake	Joanne Barkan	Tom Sawyer, Detective by Mark Twain	Joe	April 2000
After finding his father's old journal and learning about the summers he spent at Lost Lake, Joe decides to visit the family's cabin there in order to solve the mystery of what happened to the Talbot family heirloom watch that disappeared there twenty-five years before. But when he, David and Wishbone arrive, they also learn of an auction for one of the pieces of property there, and must figure out who is trying to sabotage potential bidders.

== Wishbone: The Early Years ==
Wishbone: The Early Years is aimed at much younger readers than the other series, and as such are much shorter. The books share the structure of the TV series and The Adventures of Wishbone, but are set several years prior to the TV series, featuring a younger Joe and Wishbone as a puppy. All six are based on folktales or myths and are named directly for the story they adapt.

Number	Title	Adapted by	Wishbone's story role	First printed
#1	Jack and the Beanstalk	Brad Strickland and Thomas E. Fuller	Jack	September 1999
Wishbone leaves his favorite toy behind at Joe's school. Then, he encounters a custodian he is reminded of in "Jack and the Beanstalk".
#2	The Sorcerer's Apprentice	Carla Jablonski	Philip	September 1999
When the pitching machine goes haywire while Joe and his third grade friends are practicing baseball, Wishbone imagines himself as Philip, an apprentice who takes on a powerful, evil sorcerer.
#3	Hansel and Gretel	Vivian Sathre and Rick Duffield	Hansel	November 1999
Trapped in a closet while attending a school carnival with Joe and his other third grade friends, it reminds Wishbone imagining himself as Hansel, trying to rescue himself and his sister, Gretel, from a wicked witch.
#4	The Brave Little Tailor	Vivian Sathre	The Tailor	August 2000
#5	Aladdin	Brad Strickland and Thomas E. Fuller	Aladdin	August 2000
#6	The Slave and the Lion	Joanne Barkan	Androcles	August 2000

== 2000–2001 ==
From 2000 to 2001, new series were launched, all credited to author A. D. Francis: Wishbone Adventures (replacing The Adventures of Wishbone), Wishbone Mysteries (replacing The Wishbone Mysteries) and Wishbone: Tales of a Pup (replacing Wishbone: The Early Years). A total of nine books were published before all of the series were canceled.

=== Wishbone Adventures ===
Number	Title	Inspired by	Wishbone's story role	First printed	Adapted episode
#1	Curse of Gold	Ovid's Metamorphoses	King Midas	July 2000	36. "The Entrepawneur"
Joe becomes overbearing toward Sam and David when he tries to run a grocery delivery business, reminding Wishbone of another man who let greed get the better of him.
#2	Scent of a Vampire	Dracula by Bram Stoker	Jonathan Harker	October 2000	—N/a

=== Wishbone Mysteries ===
Number	Title	Inspired by	Read by	First printed
#1	To Sniff a Thief	The Amateur Cracksman by E. W. Hornung	Sam	July 2000
#2	Wishbone's Halloween Mystery			March 2001

=== Wishbone: Tales of a Pup ===
Unlike The Early Years, the Tales of a Pup books were not directly titled for their source material, and two of the five were not based on folktales but rather a short story and a novel.

Number	Title	Inspired by	First printed
#1	Wishbone and the Glass Slipper	"Cinderella"	July 2000
#2	Wishbone and the Forty Thieves	"Ali Baba and the Forty Thieves"	July 2000
#3	Wishbone's The Nutcracker	"The Nutcracker" by Alexandre Dumas	August 2000
#4	Wishbone in Wonderland	Alice's Adventures in Wonderland by Lewis Carroll	September 2000
#5	Wishbone and the Dancing Princesses	"The Twelve Dancing Princesses"	June 2001
