= Illustrated Sporting and Dramatic News =

British weekly magazine (1874–1970)

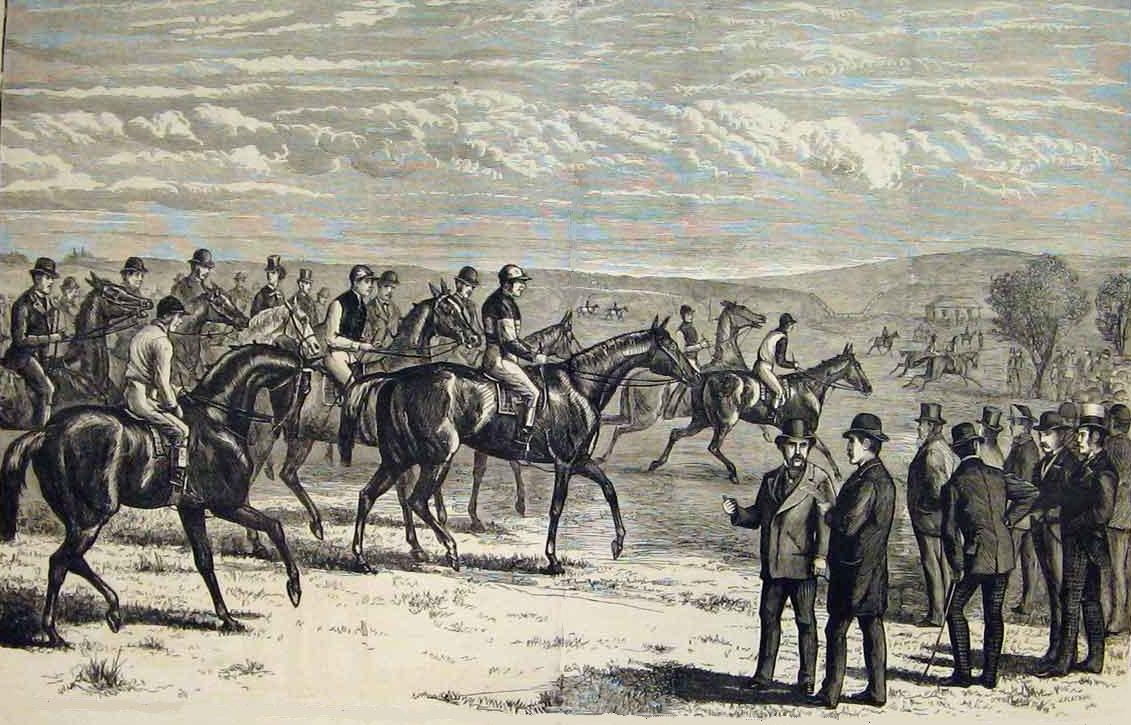
Wood-engraving of 1874's 2,000 Guineas Stakes from May 1874 Illustrated Sporting and Dramatic News

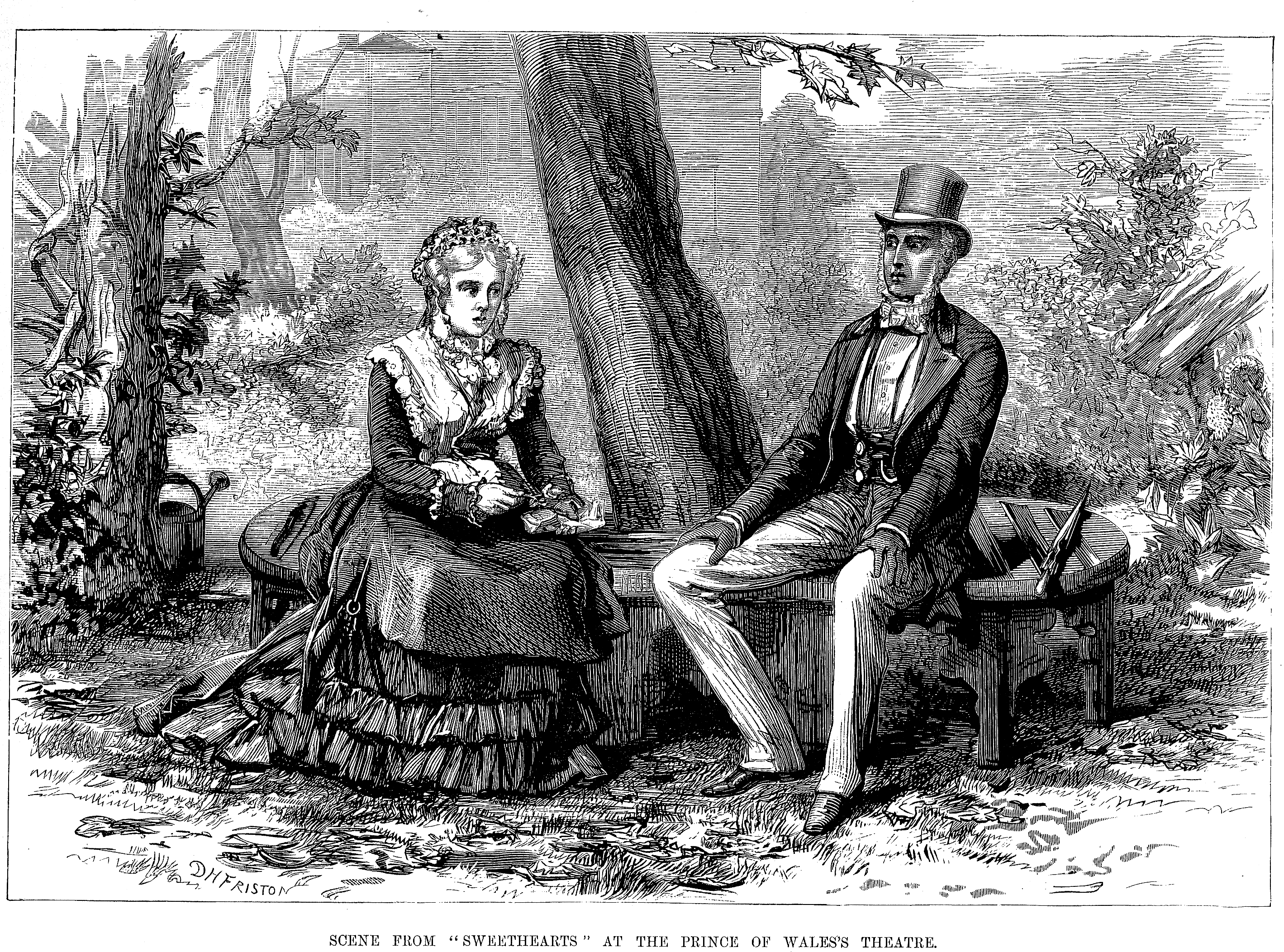
Wood-engraving by D. H. Friston of a scene from W. S. Gilbert's play Sweethearts, from the issue of 24 November 1874

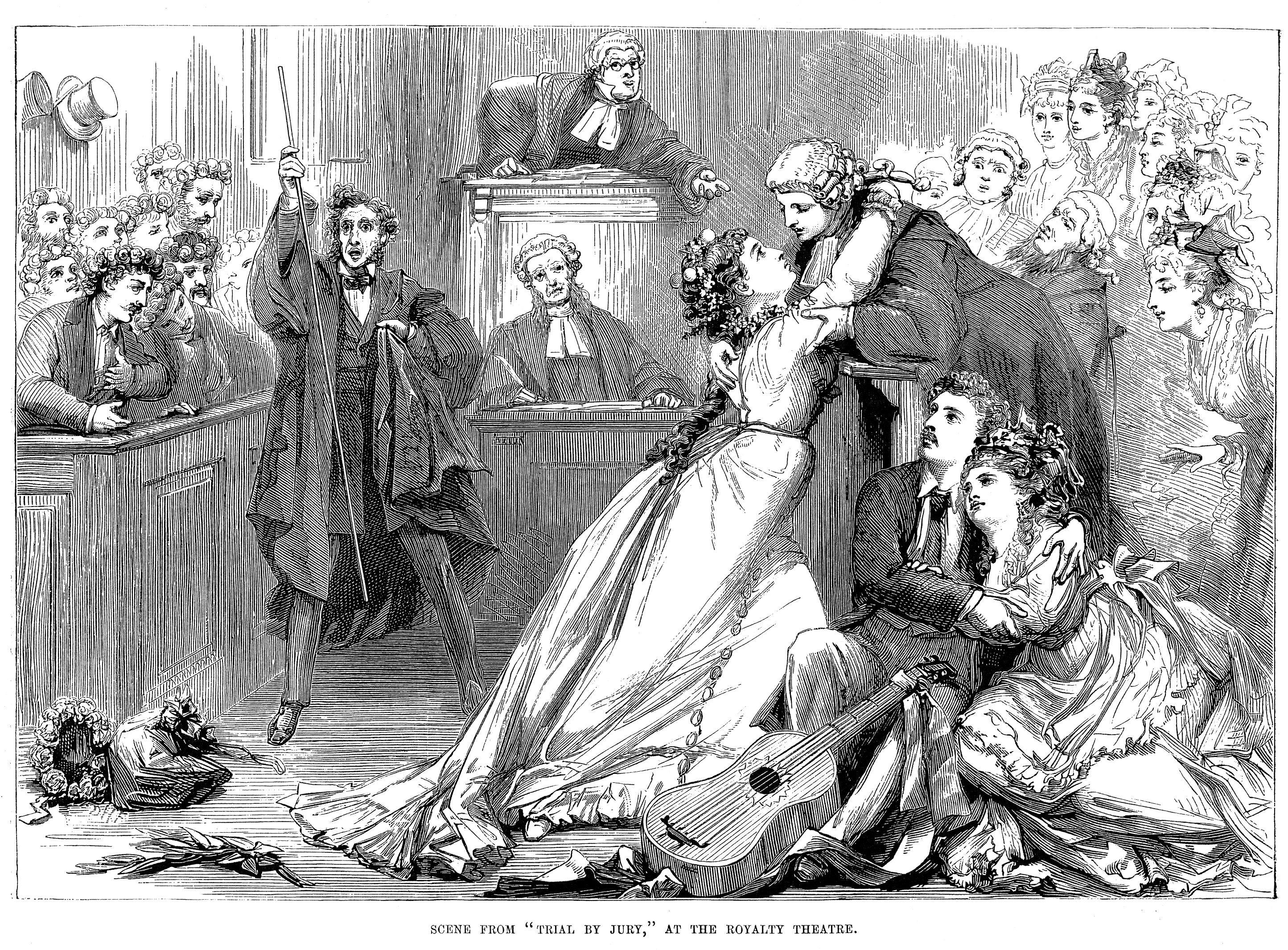
Wood-engraving by Friston of scene from Gilbert and Sullivan's Trial by Jury from the issue of 1 May 1875

The Illustrated Sporting and Dramatic News was a British weekly magazine founded in 1874 and published in London. In 1945 it changed its name to the Sport and Country, and in 1957 to the Farm and Country, before closing in 1970.

== History ==
The Illustrated Sporting and Dramatic News was founded in 1874. The paper covered, as its title indicates, both sporting and theatrical events, including news and criticism. It also contained original pieces of fiction in serials and a story or two in each issue. There were numerous similar publications in Britain at the time, including the Illustrated London News, which shared its address and some illustrators with the magazine.

In 1883, the paper published a cartoon showing Oscar Wilde in convict dress, which was considered at the time to be a very serious slur. Twelve years later, Wilde was convicted of "gross indecency" and sentenced to two years penal labour.

The paper is a good source of illustrations from sporting and theatre events, such as images of horse racing. Notable illustrators included Louis Wain, Frank R. Grey, D. H. Friston, Alfred Concanen and Alfred Bryan. In 1920, its address was 172, Strand, London WC 2.

Notable editors included James Wentworth Day, who served in the post between 1935 and 1937.

The magazine's published fiction included W. S. Gilbert's short piece, Actors, Authors and Audiences in 1880's Holly Leaves, its annual Christmas special, Bram Stoker's "The Judge's House" (1891), "The Squaw" (1893) and Crooken Sands (1894), Agatha Christie's story The Unbreakable Alibi in Holly Leaves of 1928, and her Sing a Song of Sixpence in the following year's Holly Leaves. The Irish chess grand master George Alcock MacDonnell wrote a regular chess column under the name of Mars.

According to a Catalogue of Printed Books in the Library of the British Museum, the British Library holds copies of the paper from 28 February 1874. The University of Wisconsin–Madison has all but three of the first twenty-five volumes in its English and Irish Periodicals collection.

== Titles and issues ==
- Illustrated Sporting and Dramatic News: 28 February 1874 to 22 January 1943, Nos. 1 to 3576
- Sport and Country: 5 February 1943 to 16 October 1957, Nos. 3577 to 3958
- Farm and Country: 30 October 1957 to December 1970, Nos. 3959 to 4200
- Holly Leaves: the Christmas edition of the titles, issued 1880 to 1969

== See also ==
- New York Clipper
- New York Dramatic Mirror
