= Pan Book of Horror Stories =

British paperback series

The cover of the second book in the series

The Pan Book of Horror Stories was a British paperback series of anthologies of short horror stories published by Pan Books Ltd. The series ran to thirty volumes; the first published in 1959.

The series was initially collected and edited by Herbert van Thal. On van Thal's death Clarence Paget edited the series, from volume twenty-six until its demise with volume thirty in 1989.

The early editions of the Pan Book of Horror Stories were notable for their lurid cover art and van Thal's introduction of stories by new authors alongside classics of the genre. The first edition included works by Peter Fleming, Muriel Spark, Bram Stoker and C. S. Forester. Later volumes featured Ray Bradbury and Lord Dunsany among others. Basil Copper made his debut in fifth volume, with the story "The Spider". The series also published work by Charles Birkin, R. Chetwynd-Hayes and Alex Hamilton. After volume nine, van Thal placed a heavier reliance on new authors. The series grew in popularity and was the stepping stone for much new talent. In the 1970s, the increasingly violent content of the Pan Books provoked some controversy. In the early 1980s a slow decline in standards was observed. Popularity rose again in the late decade, but a multitude of reprint stories from Stephen King and a severe slide in quality ended the iconic series in 1989. The last book is now a rare collector's item, owing to the small print run it received.

A U.S edition of the first Pan book was released by Gold Medal, an imprint of Fawcett Publications, and books 3, 4 and 5 were released by Berkley Medallion. While the first book was complete in its contents, the other three books gave only a small selection of their UK counterparts. There is no evidence to support PBoH #2 ever having a US release.

Screaming Terror, published under the Arthur Baker imprint, is a collection from the first three Pan Book of Horror Stories and is also edited by Herbert van Thal.

In the run-up to Halloween in October 2018, BBC Radio 4 broadcast Anita Sullivan's reinterpretations of five stories from the 1962 Second Pan Book Of Horror Stories as part of the station's 15 Minute Drama series.

== Reception and influence ==
The Pan Book of Horror Stories maintains a cult following with many tribute and informational sites available.

Mike Ashley took issue with the Pan Books, arguing that the books were "often gore for gore's sake", with "some of the stories showing meagre literary merit." Ashley also stated, however, that "something good crops up in each volume". Christopher Fowler read the Pan Books as a child and has praised them, stating that the Pan Books of Horror Stories set a "benchmark that all other collections had to reach." However, Fowler has also criticised the later development of the series, arguing that as "the tales became more explicitly gruesome they lost much of their power; heavier shocks were clearly required in jaundiced times."

A reprint of the initial Pan Book of Horror was published in October 2010, with an introduction by Pan expert Johnny Mains.
