= The Mystery of the Sea =

1902 novel by Bram Stoker

- First UK edition
- Author: Bram Stoker
- Language: English
- Publisher: Heinemann (UK); Doubleday Page (US)
- Publication date: 1902
- Publication place: United Kingdom
- Media type: Print (hardcover)

The Mystery of the Sea is a mystery novel by Bram Stoker, first published in 1902. It tells the story of an Englishman living in Aberdeenshire, Scotland, who meets and falls in love with an American heiress. She is involved with the intrigues of the Spanish–American War, and a complex plot involving second sight, kidnapping, and secret codes unfolds over the course of the novel.

The Mystery of the Sea contains supernatural elements, but is in many respects a political thriller. Stoker draws from personal experience and incorporates historical strands from the Spanish–American War as well as the sixteenth-century conflict between Spain and Elizabethan England, using these events to explore important themes of his time such as national identity and changing concepts of womanhood. Although The Mystery of the Sea received many favorable reviews when it was published, it has been significantly overshadowed in scholarship and criticism by Dracula.

== Bram Stoker and the literary context ==
=== Stoker's life and connections to the novel ===
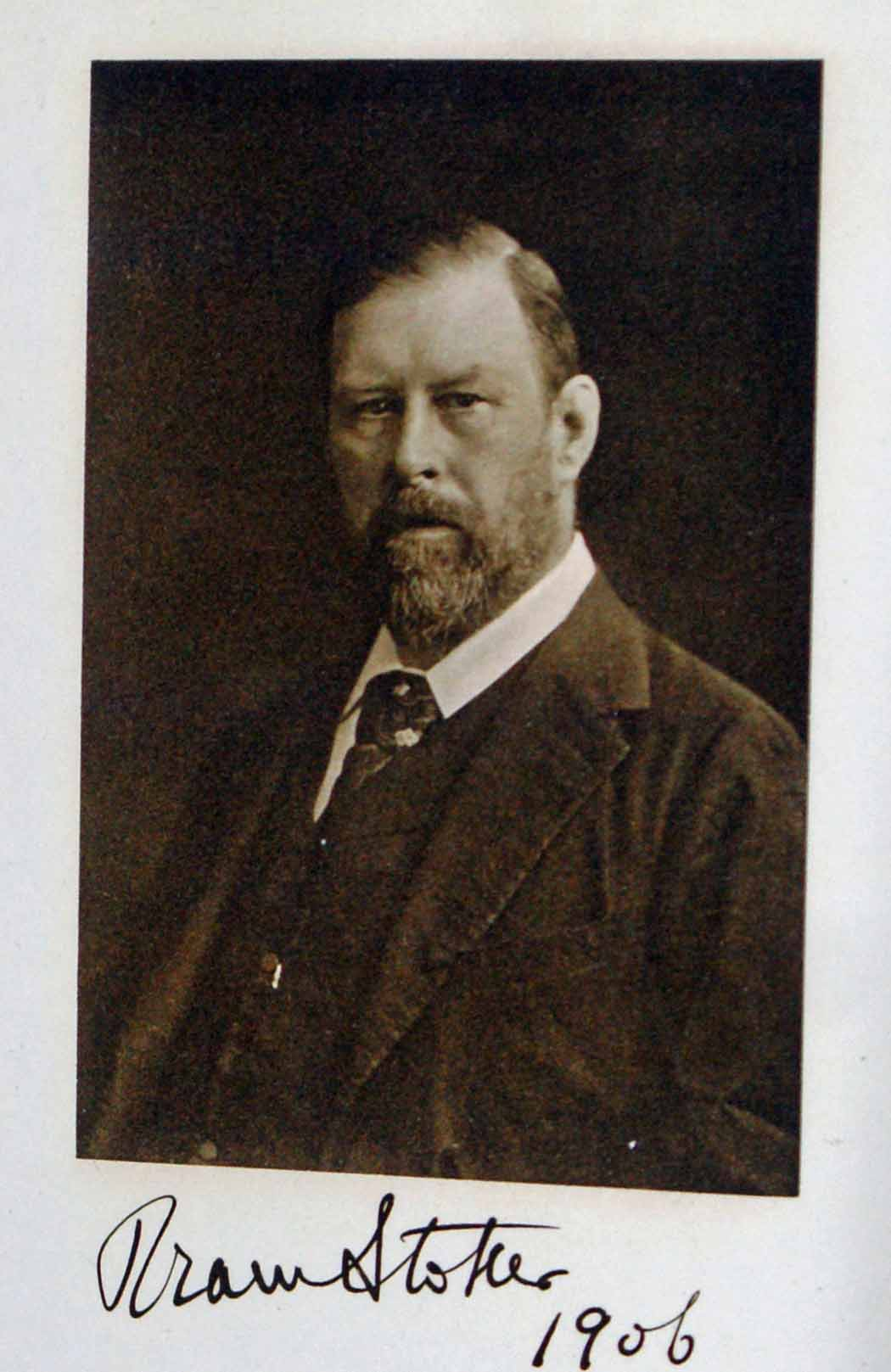
Bram Stoker

Bram Stoker was born on 8 November 1847, in Dublin, Ireland. He was brought up in a Protestant middle-class household, and was a sickly child. However, Stoker eventually grew out of his illnesses and attended Trinity College, where he studied science and mathematics. Stoker became a civil service clerk in Dublin for a short time, but was always interested in literature. He wrote short fiction and edited an Irish newspaper, publishing his first story, "The Crystal Cup", in 1872. He also submitted work to a magazine called the Shamrock, based in Dublin. In 1876, while volunteering as a drama critic for the Dublin Evening Mail, met actor Henry Irving. In 1878, Stoker moved to London to serve as manager for Irving's Lyceum Theatre. Stoker was an adept administrator and introduced a number of new practices into the theatre, including numbering seats and advertising a season or selling tickets for shows in advance. Stoker was quite busy while he worked for Irving, and much of his writing had to be done on holidays and in his spare time.

However, Stoker's business often proved to be helpful to his writings. Stoker's position at the Lyceum had a direct influence on his novels, particularly in terms of travel and setting. Company tours between 1883 and 1904 took him to America regularly. Although The Mystery of the Sea takes place in Scotland, Stoker's travels to America are important considering that the main female character of The Mystery of the Sea is American. The Lyceum tours likely provided some background information (and stereotypes) for the character of Marjory, as well as for some of Stoker's other notable American characters like Quincey Morris in Dracula. Stoker also was drawing from personal experience when he wrote about Cruden Bay, being a frequent visitor there.

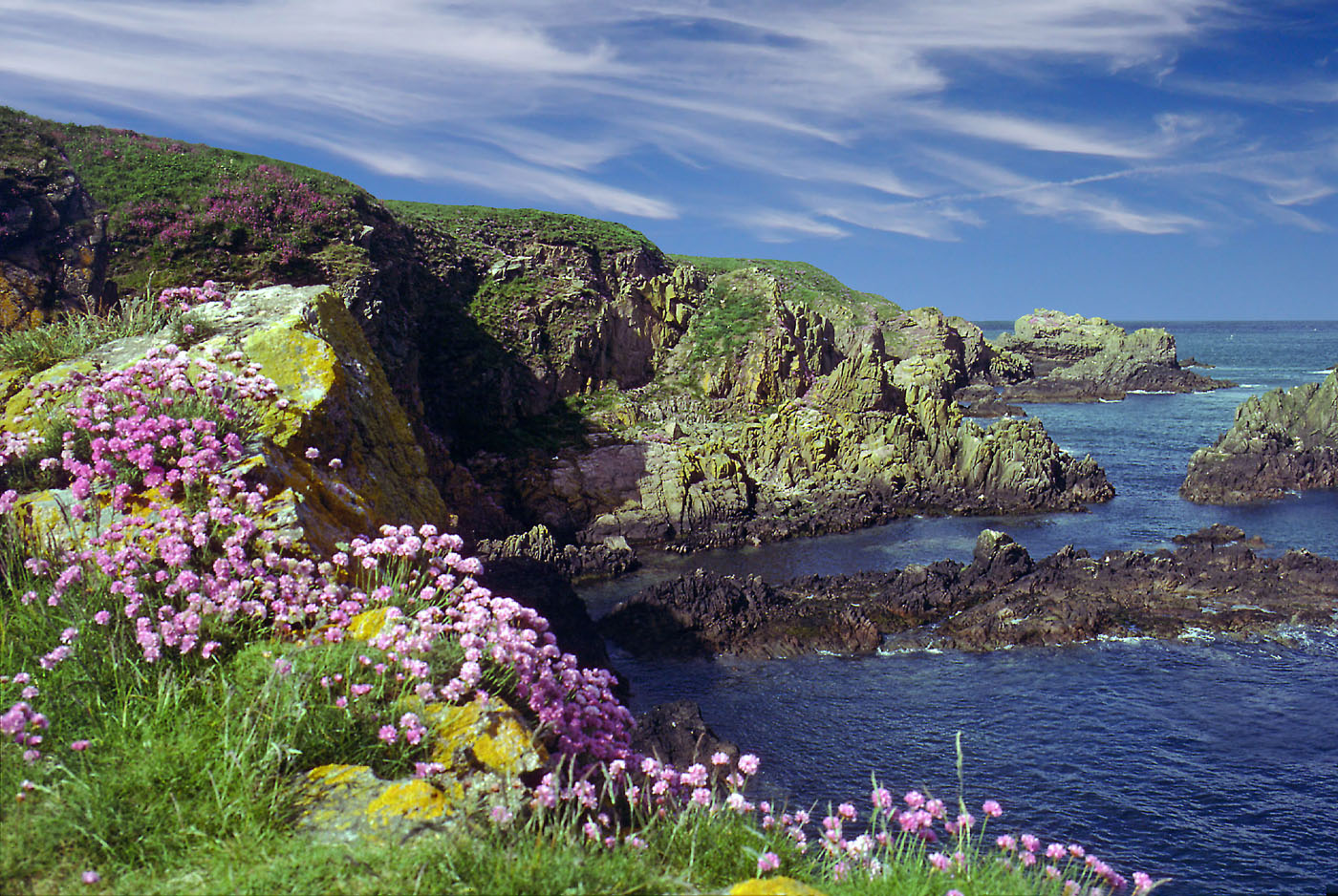
Cruden Bay

His first trip to Cruden was with Irving to research for a production of Macbeth in 1888 (incidentally, Stoker finished writing Dracula in Cruden). Carol A. Senf argues that Archibald Hunter, the protagonist of The Mystery of the Sea, is an autobiographical character because of his repeated visits to Cruden as well as the hints he gives of an invalid past and an "enthusiasm for…technology" which Senf identifies as a characteristic shared with Stoker. Archibald also mentions having studied law, which Stoker did too, although he never practiced. The character of Gormala also had a real-life inspiration; in 1901, while on holiday, Stoker was at the seaside and met a strange old woman. Locals thought she had supernatural abilities, and Stoker was inspired to write the short story "The Seer", which would later grow into The Mystery of the Sea.

Stoker worked at the Lyceum until 1902, and his professional experiences and personal friendship with Irving led to the 1905 publication of Personal Reminiscences of Henry Irving, a two-volume work dedicated to Irving that is one of the most important sources for people wanting to learn about Stoker's life. Beginning around 1897, as Irving was in decline, Stoker had depended increasingly on his writing for money. Stoker worked as a journalist and also wrote eight novels during this time, including The Mystery of the Sea (1902). While Stoker is known today for Dracula, he wrote seventeen other novels as well as many short stories and pieces for periodicals.

=== Publication history ===
The Mystery of the Sea was first published in 1902 by the London firm W. Heinemann. The same year, it was published in America by the New York-based Doubleday, Page, & Co. A digitized copy of this version is available from Google Books and is linked below. In 1903, a two-volume version was released as part of a series called The English Library, published by Leipzig, Heinemann, and Balestier. This particular series was an effort to bring English fiction to the continent, and Stoker himself invested in the company. Heinemann published another edition of the novel in 1914, as did the London company Rider. The beginning of the book was published as a short story called "The Seer" in The London Magazine in 1901. There have been various reprints and e-book editions of The Mystery of the Sea during the late twentieth and early twenty-first centuries, many of which are accessible online.

== Historical context ==
The Mystery of the Sea has two important layers of historical context: the Spanish–American War, and the sixteenth-century interactions between England and Spain. The first event is contemporaneous with the events of the novel and Stoker's lifetime, while the second provides a backdrop and historical frame within the novel. The sixteenth-century and nineteenth-century events are closely intertwined in the novel, and both play a role in the politics of the story as well as character and plot development. A review in The Athenaeum from Stoker's time recognizes these historical resonances from a surprisingly close perspective. This reviewer notes that "because the charming heroine is American, we have another 'mystery.' It is the time of the Spanish–American War, and naturally a Spanish grandee is brought upon the scene". The reviewer also pinpoints the "recent controversy that suggests the Baconian Bilateral Cipher as the means of finding the Papal hoard".

=== Spanish–American War ===
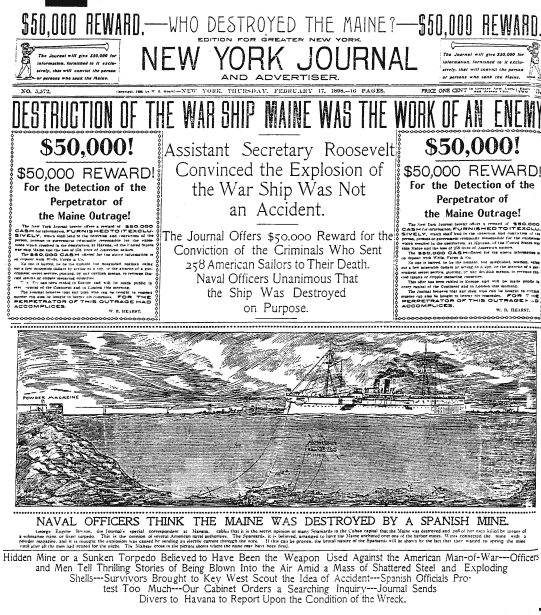
An example of the type of sensationalized journalism that moved popular opinion against the Spanish

As suggested by the reviewer's reference to a "recent controversy", the Spanish–American War was only recent history when The Mystery of the Sea was published in 1902. The Spanish–American War began in 1897 with America's involvement in the Cuban insurrection against Spain. Cuban revolutionaries had begun fighting Spanish rule in 1895, and Spanish troops were sent to Cuba, where they set up camps known as reconcentrados, meant to contain the rebels. Conditions in these camps were very poor, and they became fodder for "yellow journalism" in the United States, provoking sympathy and outrage on behalf of the Cubans. Many American politicians supported the idea of going to war, and some even wanted to annex Cuba to the United States. Tensions with Spain intensified upon the publication of a letter from the Spanish minister that insulted President William McKinley, calling him weak. However, the event leading up to the war that caused the greatest public uproar and bears particular significance to The Mystery of the Sea was the explosion of the battleship Maine in Havana in 1898. This caused an outpouring of public sentiment against the Spanish, even though the explosion was most likely not the result of a vicious attack. Popular headlines and slogans like "Remember the Maine, to Hell with Spain" suggest that the character Marjory's attitude is a representation of the broader American public attitude during the Spanish–American War, and adds significance to her decision to use her fortune to buy a battleship for the U.S. Navy to use against the Spanish.

=== Spanish Armada ===
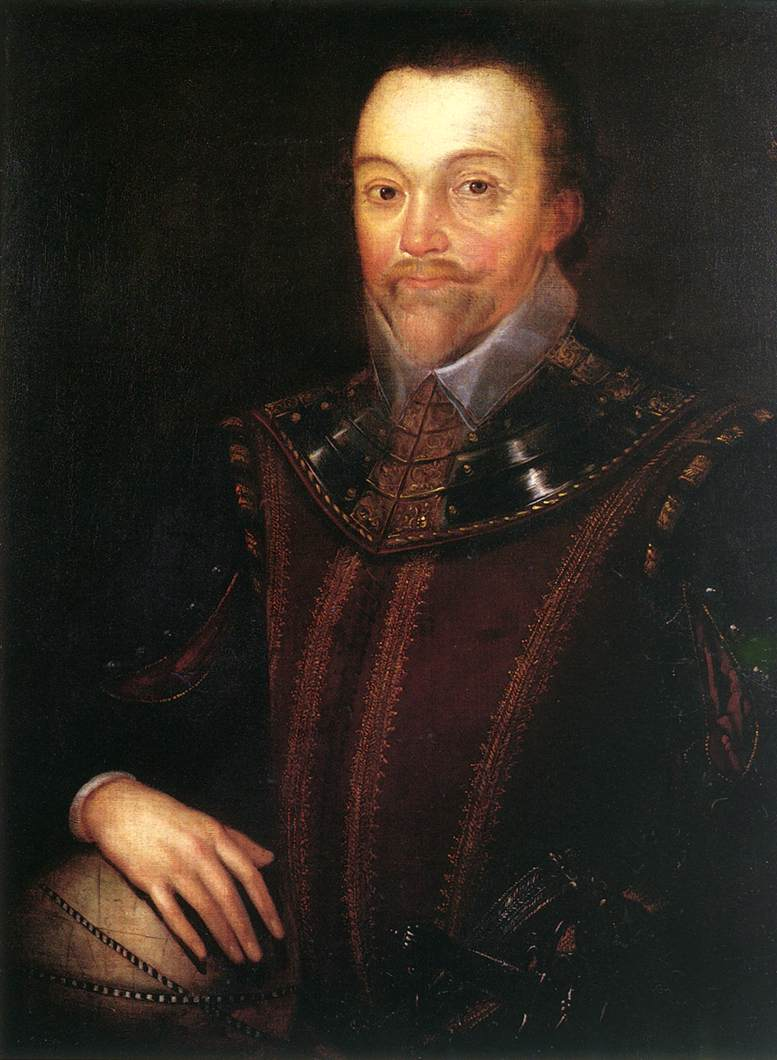
Sir Francis Drake

The defeat of the Spanish Armada in 1588 was a major victory for England, and, in a larger sense, for Protestantism. Philip II of Spain had hoped to use the attack to incite a rebellion against the English Protestant monarchy under Elizabeth I. By this point in English history, Elizabeth was firmly establishing her Protestant rule (the Church of England had been established under her father, Henry VIII). She had already beheaded her Catholic cousin, Mary Stuart, and had taken several hostile actions towards Catholic Spain. These included authorizing Francis Drake to attack Spanish ships and ports and supporting the Dutch against Spanish rule in the Netherlands. There are two connections here to the novel's heroine, Marjory Drake. First, Marjory is revealed to be a descendant of Sir Francis Drake, the same pirate (or hero, depending on which side one is on) who was so closely linked to Queen Elizabeth's successes. Second, in buying a battleship, Marjory is aiming to support the Cuban rebels against Spanish domination, just as Elizabeth was on the side of the Dutch against the Spanish.

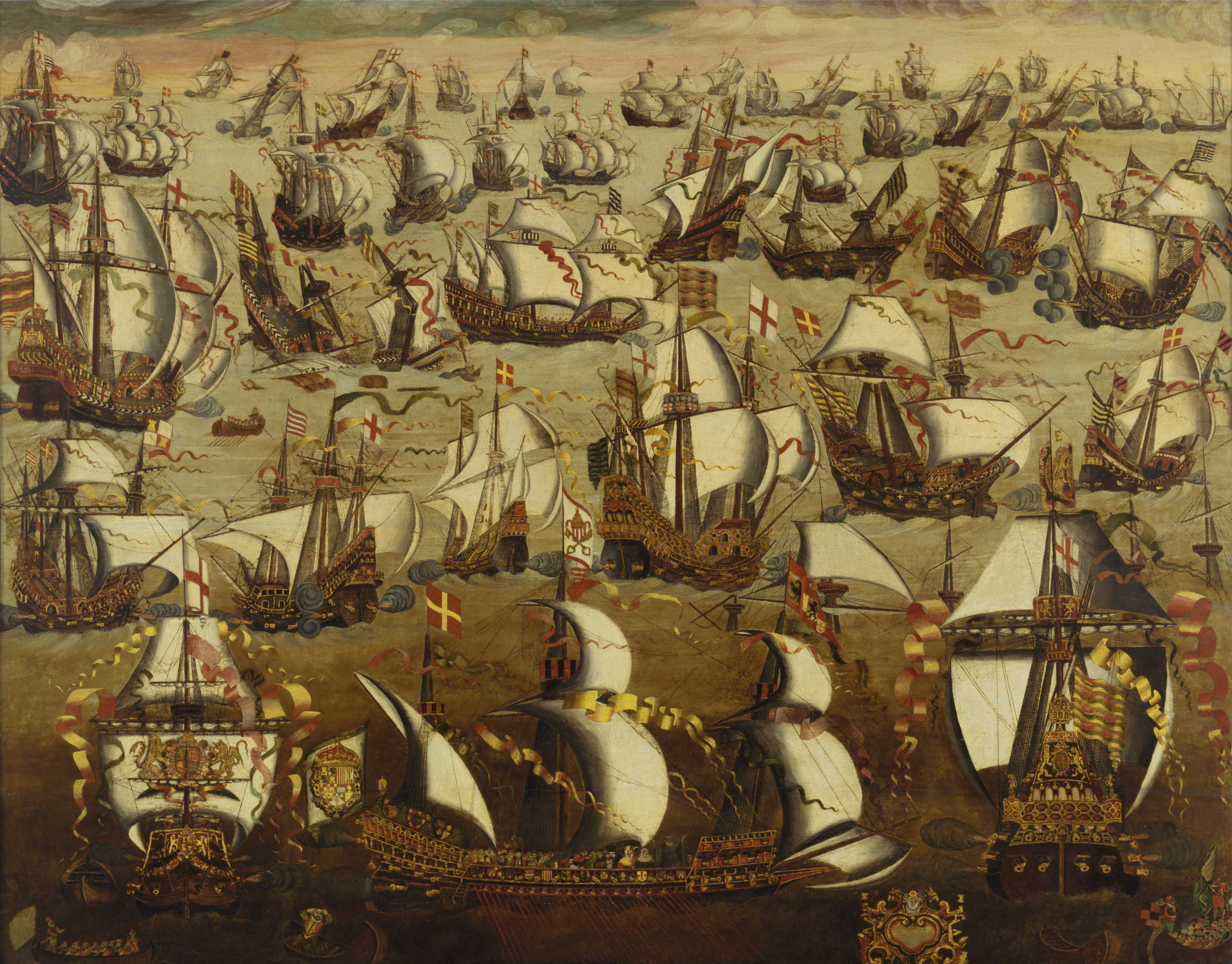
The Armada

The actual defeat of the Spanish Armada occurred in August 1588 when the British and Spanish ships met at Gravelines. The British victory over the strong Spanish fleet had more to do with logistical issues for the Spanish and favorable winds than it did with English naval prowess, but the British Protestants took it as a moral (and even a divinely ordained) triumph. The buried treasure that figures so prominently in Stoker's novel was supposedly granted to one of the sailors of the Armada by Pope Sixtus V after the Armada's defeat to use in further actions against England. The characters are still haunted by this treasure, and the conflict is perpetuated when the American heiress, Marjory, comes into contact with Don Bernardino, the Spaniard whose family is in charge of the treasure. Scholar Andrew Smith argues that the interactions between these two characters are very "politicised" due to their positions in the Spanish–American War, but also sees The Mystery of the Sea as an exploration of Catholic-Protestant conflicts on a wider scale (possibly having to do with Stoker's Irish background), incorporating the earlier tensions from the Elizabethan conflict. Ultimately, Smith observes a unifying of Catholics and Protestants in both time periods due to the use of the Baconian Cipher (a Protestant-invented device) to convey a Catholic message and the collaboration between the Catholic Don Bernardino and Protestant Archibald Hunter as they work to defend Marjory's honor, among other reasons. Regardless of specific interpretation, there is a sense throughout the novel that political and religious struggles can endure far longer than the people who start them.

=== Minor historical influences ===
Smaller-scale public events of Stoker's own time also play a role the novel. One of the detectives working to find Marjory notes that one of the kidnappers was probably involved in the A.T. Stewart ransom case. A.T. Stewart was an immigrant who came to America from Belfast in 1818. He became a millionaire working in the dry-goods business, but after his death, his body was stolen from its tomb in 1878. The original people arrested for the crime were not actually the perpetrators, and the body was never found. Scholar Lisa Hopkins points out that this case is an "ominous" one for Stoker to reference while the men in the novel are searching for Marjory because it involved a corpse rather than a living person and the mystery was never quite solved. Hopkins also indicates some notable parallels to Dracula when Lucy has become a vampire and is "able to escape from a locked tomb". All of this, according to Hopkins, creates "a powerful atmosphere of the uncanny" and "a sense of the odds that are stacked against the novel's hero". The fact that the Stewart case proved too much for even the Pinkerton Detective Agency to solve also could be an opportunity for Stoker to detract from "the American reputation for efficiency" and thus "incriminat[e] Marjory".

== Plot summary ==
Archibald Hunter, a young Englishman, is passing his leisure time near Cruden Bay in the small Scottish village of Whinnyfold when he has a vision of a couple walking past him, carrying a tiny coffin. Archibald also notices a strange old woman watching him. Later, he finds out that his vision has come true, and a child in town has died. Archibald encounters the bizarre old woman again on the seashore; this woman, who introduces herself as Gormala MacNeil, knows that Archibald saw something out of the ordinary. She proceeds to explain that she has "Second Sight"—a sort of psychic ability for premonition that comes and goes at random—and that she can tell that Archibald, too, is a Seer. Fluctuating between skepticism and uneasiness over his newfound abilities, Archibald listens to Gormala's insights and sees one of his visions fulfilled at Lammas-tide, when he and Gormala witness Lauchlane Macleod, a local fisherman, wreck his boat on a chain of sharp rocks known as the Skares. Archibald sees a procession of dead spirits emerge from the water near the Skares and make its way up the cliffs.

About a year later, Archibald has returned to Cruden Bay and is preparing a permanent residence there. He buys a trunk from an auctioneer on the street (where he again encounters Gormala) and finds that the trunk contains letters from the late 16th and early 17th century. While near the seashore, Archibald notices two ladies stranded on a rock out in the ocean. He helps them get back to shore, and learns that one of the ladies is an elderly woman named Mrs. Jack, and the other a young, beautiful woman named Marjory, an American who has a strong aversion to Spaniards. Archibald feels himself falling in love with Marjory instantly. Later, Marjory helps Archibald decode the letters that he found in the trunk, which are written in a complicated cipher (Bacon's cipher). Archibald soon proposes marriage to Marjory, but she declines with the excuse that she does not know him well enough.

Eventually, Archibald deciphers all of the documents in the trunk and finds that it is a narrative written by a Spaniard named Don Bernardino de Escoban. Don Bernardino was given a trust by Pope Sixtus V in the late sixteenth century, which included the charge of a substantial treasure to use against England after the defeat of the Spanish Armada. The duty to protect this treasure was to be passed down through generations of Don Bernardino's family, but Don Bernardino lost the treasure after hiding it in a seaside cave. Conveniently, Archibald realizes that, based on the documents, the most likely location of this cave is directly under the house he is currently building.

Later, when he is in Aberdeen, Archibald encounters a pair of diplomats, and they inform him that the woman he has been spending time with is really Marjory Drake, an heiress from Chicago who used her fortune to buy a battleship for the U.S. Navy to use against the Spanish during the Spanish–American War. There is a Spanish plot against Marjory's life, and the United States government has been trying to protect her, but she fled to Scotland to keep them from interfering with her liberty. Archibald also finds out from Marjory that she is a descendant of Sir Francis Drake, the pirate behind many Elizabethan schemes against the Spanish.

Archibald wants to help Marjory escape the threat of kidnapping, and the two eventually get married so as to avoid any legal trouble or scandal since Archibald has been coming and going from Castle Crom, Marjory's residence. Archibald soon succeeds in finding the entrance of the treasure cave, and suspects the presence of secret passages on the grounds of Castle Crom.

One afternoon, while Marjory and Archibald are at Castle Crom looking at the Spanish documents, the landlord of the castle arrives and interrupts them. This landlord is a Spaniard named Don Bernardino—the descendant of the man who wrote the documents. He is astounded that Archibald has possession of the documents and asks that Archibald return the documents to their proper place and not disturb them again. Archibald and Marjory nonetheless decide to continue looking for the treasure, which they find (with some danger) in the cave under Archibald's house. Don Bernardino and Archibald almost have a duel over this newfound treasure, but decide against it. Meanwhile, Marjory goes missing.

Archibald decides to ask Don Bernardino for help finding Marjory, and Don Bernardino sees the opportunity of helping to rescue the young woman as a chance to regain the honor he lost in failing to find the treasure. He reveals a secret passage in the castle, and the police determine that Marjory has been kidnapped. Fortunately, Marjory has left a cipher for Archibald, giving him instructions for how to find her. Archibald encounters Gormala during the search and enlists her help, despite the fact that she had previously led the band of kidnappers to Archibald's house, where they stole the treasure. Gormala falls on the cliff, and takes Archibald's hands as she is dying. Through Gormala's power of Second Sight, Archibald sees a vision of a ship and learns of Marjory's location.

While on the ship, Archibald kills two of the kidnappers and releases Marjory. A fight ensues, and Archibald, Marjory, and Don Bernardino are thrown into the water around the Skares. Archibald forces his way to shore, dragging Marjory along with him. Many of the bodies of the other men involved in the struggle are washed up on the shore. Don Bernardino is one of the dead. Marjory and Archibald ensure that his body is taken back to Spain and buried with his ancestors, and they install above his tomb the statue of San Cristobal that guarded over the treasure in the cave.

== Major characters ==
Archibald Hunter—Archibald is the narrator and protagonist of the novel. He has been trained in law, but generally lacks purpose until he meets Marjory and becomes involved in the political and emotional intrigue surrounding the treasure. In this context, he proves to be a courageous, intelligent, and able man, and also one who is willing to make sacrifices for love. He has Second Sight, which allows him to see important events unfold at certain points in the novel.

Marjory Drake—Marjory is an American heiress who takes great pains to travel unknown in Scotland. She has a fervent hatred for Spaniards and a love for adventure. Marjory is independent and strong-willed, but is subdued somewhat by her love for Archibald. She is also intelligent and resourceful, and instead of being a passive victim, sets traps for her pursuers and leaves a trail of ciphers when she is captive to lead her friends to her.

Mrs. Jack—Mrs. Jack is Marjory's elderly companion. She has rather traditional views and advises the progressive Marjory regarding her duties as a wife.

Gormala MacNeil— Gormala is a mysterious old woman who notices Archibald's first episode of Second Sight. She is also a Seer, and appears throughout the novel at critical moments, offering cryptic, frightening, or helpful information to Archibald. It is never clear whether she is a friend or foe until the end of the novel, when she uses her powers as she is dying to help Archibald rescue Marjory from the kidnappers.

Don Bernardino—Don Bernardino is the descendant of a Spanish Armada officer (involved in the famous 1588 battle against the English navy) who was given charge by the Pope of a treasure to use against the English. He values duty and honor above all things and is willing to sacrifice his life for the sacred mission entrusted to his family line. He begins as an enemy of Archibald, but later the two men are allies.

== Genre ==
The Mystery of the Sea incorporates elements from a variety of genres and does not fit comfortably into a single category. Lisa Hopkins has called it "a novel no more amenable to generic classification than the rest of Stoker's fiction" due to its being "Part Love story, part political tract, part treasure quest and part tale of the supernatural". Indeed, depending on the points of focus of the reader or interpreter, The Mystery of the Sea could easily be classified as a Gothic novel, an adventure novel, or a political novel. However, its amalgamation of the political and the supernatural bring it closest to the genre of "Imperial Gothic" as defined by Patrick Brantlinger. Imperial Gothic, according to Brantlinger, "combines the seemingly progressive, often Darwinian ideology of imperialism with a seemingly antithetical interest in the occult." The Imperial Gothic as a genre has been associated with works such as Dracula and Rider Haggard's She; appropriately, Hopkins designates these two novels as the "closest antecedents" to The Mystery of the Sea in terms of genre. While The Mystery of the Sea does not explicitly refer to colonization and does not address fears of degeneration into savagery as do many novels in the Imperial Gothic realm, Stoker's novel addresses the occult within a cross-cultural context, and race is a pervasive theme. Stoker creates a multi-layered historical and political background by setting the events of the novel during the Spanish–American War but with a centuries-old basis in the sixteenth-century conflict between England and Spain. In this manner, the Spanish are presented as a looming threat to Anglo-American society, and the struggle of power and values characteristic of Imperial fiction manifests itself here on a domestic level, with fears of invasion reminiscent of Dracula. The occult plays a role in confronting this foreign threat to power and stability through Archibald's gift of Second Sight and the presence of an ongoing dialogue on fate in the midst of the political intrigue.

The Mystery of the Sea has also been classified as a novel of science. Scholar Carol A. Senf has recognized connection between the Gothic strains of the novel and science, and while she does not explicitly classify The Mystery of the Sea as science fiction, she argues that the novel presents "a world where both science and mystery can exist side by side" and that "Stoker has not totally abandoned Gothic mystery for scientific certainty". Senf traces the importance of technology—such as warships, revolvers, mechanisms used to explore the cave—to the events of the novel and the characters' efforts to search for answers, and sees a juxtaposition between this technological impulse and characters such as Don Bernardino and Gormala, who are remnants of the Gothic. Gormala, according to Senf, is a reminder of mystery and the unexplainable. While the Gothic and science are essentially opposing forces, the conflict between them is an important aspect of the atmosphere of Stoker's work. The scientific connection once more brings The Mystery of the Sea into a place in the literature of empire; Englishmen who were confident in the power of science and knowledge were in turn confident of the control they exerted around the world.

Ultimately, the character of the Gothic pervades even those aspects of the novel that at first glance seem to be far away from the Gothic genre. The buried treasure, for instance, could point to classification of The Mystery of the Sea as an adventure story, but this treasure has come down through the centuries as a hereditary trust, protected most recently by Don Bernardino, a clear "representative of the past" and an "evolutionary throwback", evoking the mysterious past and atavistic qualities that are characteristic of Gothic fiction. Scholars such as Lisa Hopkins have also noticed direct connections between the cave where the treasure is hidden and a similar treasure cave in Ann Radcliffe's The Sicilian Romance. Politics, too, are underscored by the Gothic. Marjory's kidnapping is provoked by political motives, but this line of the story echoes the Gothic plotline of an innocent, imprisoned young woman whose lover must come and rescue her from wicked (often foreign) men. The Mystery of the Sea, although difficult to classify, is a thriller in any context, and one that, as outlined above, displays tendencies of long-standing genres as well as those that were newly emerging in Stoker's time.

== Style ==
The Mystery of the Sea is a first-person, past tense narrative from the point of view of Archibald Hunter, the male protagonist. The representations of events in the novel are strongly colored by Archibald's feelings and reflections on his experience. The novel often takes on a fatalistic and sometimes sentimental tone, drawing on the strong emotions, fatalism, and romanticized descriptions of nature in earlier Gothic novels. The Mystery of the Sea is not written in a series of journal entries and personal correspondence like Dracula, and it lacks a clear narrative frame except for certain instances when Archibald indicates that he is looking back on events and reflecting. The novel, does, however, include an appendix with the testimonies of the sixteenth-century Spaniards involved with the hiding of the treasure as well as some examples of the Baconian Cipher, echoing other adventure novels (such as Rider Haggard's She) that incorporate "real" documents into the fictional fabric of events. The novel, due to its memoir-like structure, is presented as a recollection of factual events, and is sensationalist and melodramatic in its fast-paced, busy plot, but it lacks the immediate currency of such epistolary classics as Dracula, and earlier, The Woman in White. Contemporary reviewers of The Mystery of the Sea generally expressed contentment with his rather melodramatic writing style even if they seemed to tire of the melodramatic plot content. One reviewer, for instance, called the novel "exceedingly well written", and others admired Stoker's writing skill despite what they considered over-workings of the plot.

== Themes ==
=== National identity and race ===
National identity is an important feature in The Mystery of the Sea; Stoker often seems to be raising the question of whether one's nationality or individual personality is the primary determining factor in personal identity. Nationality also is closely tied into the political backstory of The Mystery of the Sea, with an ancient conflict between Spain and England providing tensions that last all the way up to the days of the Spanish–American War. Andrew Smith sees this conflict of national interests as a manifestation of a deeper Catholic-Protestant rift, while Lisa Hopkins calls Cruden bay in the novel "a miniature melting-pot in which a variety of tensions between different races and nationalities can be ultimately resolved by displacing nationalized conflicts onto gendered ones [i.e. seeing the female as more of a threat than the foreigner]". These issues are most clearly presented through the characters of Marjory and Don Bernardino. Marjory is an American heiress, constantly asserting her American-ness through references to her independence, her level-headedness, and her fighting streak. Archibald, too, notices that she is different from most British girls. She hates Spaniards with a passion, and makes no secret of this hatred during her initial meeting with Don Bernardino. Don Bernardino, like Marjory, is very proud of his national heritage, but instead of stressing his personal independence as she does, he emphasizes his role in a long family line and the importance of maintaining his honor and fulfilling an ancient trust. Marjory and Don Bernardino clearly have different sets of values that are strongly influenced by their respective nationalities, but as the novel progresses, some of these stereotypes are supplanted by emerging individual personality traits. Marjory, for example, has a soft side and comes to appreciate Don Bernardino, while the Spaniard decides that helping Marjory can make up for his failure to fulfill the trust (although this still has to do with motives of honor). This new understanding between Marjory and Don Bernardino could easily be a reflection of the political atmosphere of the time. While American forces had been wary of the Spanish during the initial period of the war, there were high levels of "fraternisation between the Spanish and their captors [the Americans] during the occupation of Cuba because the Americans had noticed the "heroism and honor" of the Spaniards. Political differences also decrease in importance as the characters come to appreciate each other as individuals. The main English character, Archibald Hunter, is not as overtly tied to his national identity as the Spanish and American characters and is for most of the novel a passive observer of national traits in others. However, he does sometimes make statements regarding what it is to be English, often in contrast to the characteristics of Americans.

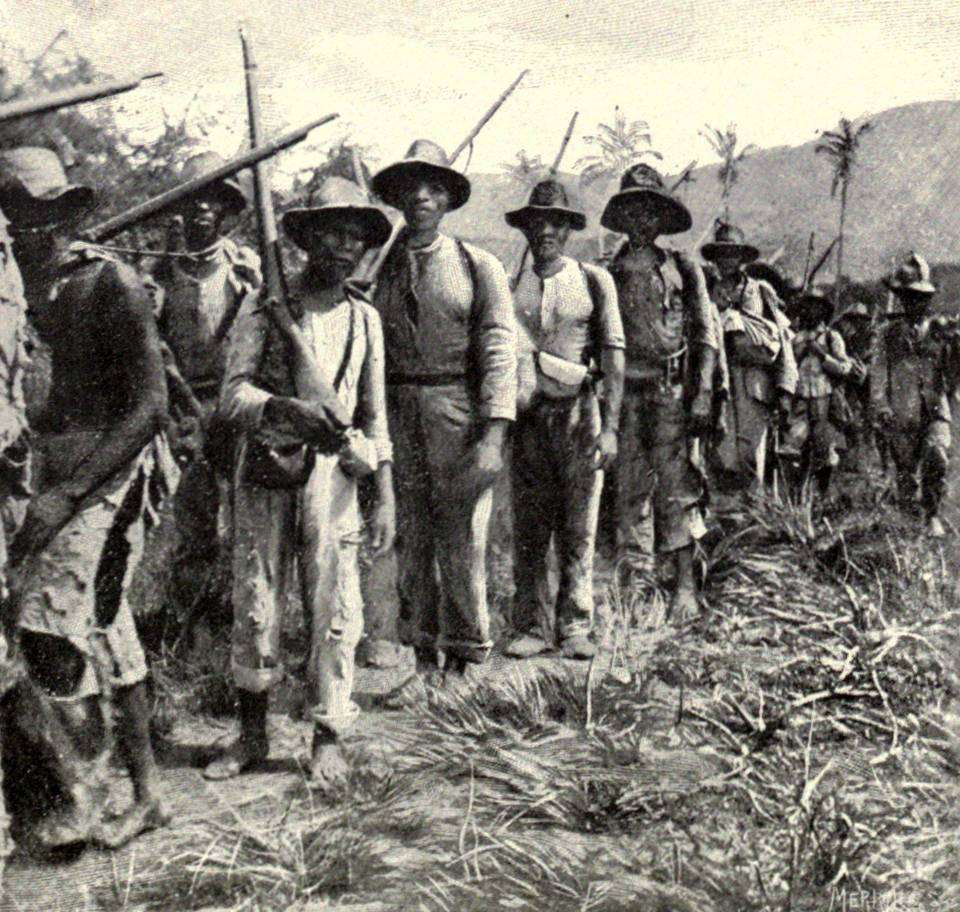
Cuban soldiers, 1898

Race in a broader context is also addressed in The Mystery of the Sea, but to a much lesser extent than nationality. Smith connects the theme of race to the political context of the Spanish–American War, arguing that Americans constructed "fantasies of conflict" in order to transform the war into a "moral crusade against the Spanish". In the popular imagination, Cubans were presented as white, while the Spanish were imagined as "swarthy", adding a racial dimension to the fighting. This ideological (and inaccurate) racial construction was largely unsuccessful after American forces had actually gone into Cuba, but these ideas, namely judgment based on skin color, are important in The Mystery of the Sea. Stoker paints the character of the "negro" kidnapper as inherently depraved and inferior to the white men (Archibald even goes so far as to declare that he is "the active principle of whatever evil might be"), and Archibald fears that this dark-skinned man is going to rape Marjory. Smith sees this man as a representation of the Cubans, a "common enemy" of both Catholic and Protestant forces as the Spanish–American War progressed. Archibald eventually murders this man while saving Marjory, exulting in the murder and soliloquizing at length about how a justified murder is an exhilarating deed. It is unclear whether this apparent justification stems from the fact that the potential assailant was black or from the crime he was about to commit, but Stoker nonetheless presents only a negative picture of people of African descent, and one that is in accord with the tensions of the time period.

British colonial and Imperial actions in Africa could also be seen as contributing to this negative portrayal of African heritage; indeed, the passages describing the "negro" bear some similarities to the heavily racist language in famous works associated with imperialism, such as Conrad's Heart of Darkness (which predates The Mystery of the Sea by only three years). In both novels, the black characters are portrayed as atavistic and savage, but Stoker's portrayal is much more simplistic, pinning the origin of evil directly on the "negro". Regardless of how the reader reacts to Conrad's and Stoker's respective descriptions of dark-skinned people, it is important to recognize that The Mystery of the Sea is part of a larger discourse on race that was influenced by the vitality of the British Empire. Indeed, racism has been characterized by some as "colonialism brought home", which fits in with Archibald's thoughts on the one black character in the novel as well as the larger political and imperialist themes of the work. Archibald is not directly involved with the conflict in Cuba, nor is he involved with colonization (although colonial implications could possibly be drawn from the fact that he is an Englishman living in Scotland). However, despite Archibald's lack of immediate involvement in British Imperial schemes, he is an embodiment of popular perceptions of race and "civilization" as the British knew it. He feels no qualms about killing the black man, recognizes an active evil in this racial "other", and triumphs in rescuing the purity of his white beloved from the threat of her dark-skinned attacker.

=== Fate and the supernatural ===
There is an ongoing conflict between fate and the natural course of events versus human actions in The Mystery of the Sea. The natural and the supernatural are in constant collision and interaction. The Seer Gormala MacNeil continuously warns Archibald against trying to disrupt fate, and Archibald himself begins to accept the presence of forces above humanity and even admits that he is "content to be an obedient item in the general scheme of things". Carol A. Senf notes this tension between the natural and the supernatural, describing Gormala as one who "haunts Hunter throughout the novel, frequently reminding him of his own occult abilities and reinforcing for the reader that science cannot provide the answer to everything". The natural is seemingly governed by the supernatural, but rather than there being a defined separation between the two, they merge into one another, especially for the Seers (Archibald and Gormala). As Archibald gains understanding of his gift of Second Sight, he becomes less and less skeptical of the mysterious and more questioning of the things he used to know. Looking back on his first experience of a vision, Archibald notes that

"all of the forces of life and nature became exposed to my view. A thousand things which hitherto I had accepted in simple faith as facts, were pregnant as new meanings. I began to understand that the whole earth and sea, and air—all of that of which human beings generally ordinarily take cognizance, is but a film or crust which hides the deeper moving power or forces".

Archibald now believes in a "purposeful cause of universal action" seemingly over and above, yet directing, the concerns of humans and their endeavors. Despite all of the political scheming and brave actions of individual adventurers, the force of fate lies underneath every event. Archibald Hunter is much more optimistic in his tone about the presence of fate than some characters in other novels of this genre and era who have had to confront the shortcomings of science or order in the natural world in the face of fate. H. G. Wells' Edward Prendick in The Island of Dr. Moreau, for example, sees a life without meaning once he observes the disorder caused by Moreau's science. Stoker's own Van Helsing from Dracula questions his medical knowledge once he realizes that he is dealing with an evil that cannot be cured by any medical remedy. Archibald does not seem to see the supernatural or fate as working against him—most of his immediate problems spring from political tensions and other human beings. Although Stoker takes advantage of the ominous effect that can be derived from invoking fate and supernatural forces, fate is ultimately portrayed as a force over and above the flaws of individuals and as something that can make amends for foolish human errors. The kidnappers are drowned, Don Bernardino regains his honor in death, and the mysterious Seer, Gormala, meets her end near the same bay where she first met Archibald Hunter, lending a sense of justice and closure to what could have been a dark story.

=== Femininity, new and old ===
As with nationality, The Mystery of the Sea often addresses gendered conceptions of identity, and presents an ambivalent view on the roles of women. David Glover asserts that Stoker's "writings can certainly be placed within the antifeminist backlash of the [late Victorian] period", while Lisa Hopkins recognizes the tensions in Stoker's work regarding the New Woman and notes how Archibald Hunter must confront "menacing and insubordinate females". Marjory, the female protagonist, is a crossing point between the ideal mid-nineteenth-century woman and the idea of the New Woman, which had taken shape at the end of the century. She is brave, independent, and defiant, as exemplified by her purchase of a warship, her evasion of the diplomats who try to protect her, and constant assertions that she has a fighting spirit. Mrs. Jack, her companion, represents more traditional views of womanhood, as shown when she lectures Marjory on her duties to her husband. Marjory eventually listens to Mrs. Jack's advice, and her somewhat exceptional behavior ultimately does not interfere with her "feminine" weaknesses. Marjory is deeply in love with her husband and ends the novel saying she will never leave his side. She occasionally betrays fear and even expresses longing for some of the more traditional feminine characteristics apparently typical of non-American women. Archibald loves her and is enamored with her fierce spirit, and admires her "coolness of head" but this does not stop him from noting that she possesses "the little morsel of hysterics which goes to make up the sum total of every woman". Hopkins observes that Archibald feels that he ultimately has the advantage by being a man, and notes that gender is "the one arena in which Stoker's men… can always win". Despite the apparent power of Marjory's "new" brand of femininity, it is ultimately flawed in Stoker's representations. The strongest example of this contradiction between the strength of the New Woman and more traditional feminine weakness is Archibald's assertion that "my Marjory, though a strong and brave one, was but a woman after all". Throughout The Mystery of the Sea, women are shown to be intelligent and generally more useful than passive; however, this does not stop the narrator from characterizing women as best suited to being subservient, pleasing companions to men.

There are some notable similarities between portrayals of women in The Mystery of the Sea and Stoker's more famous Dracula; Mina Harker and Marjory Drake both begin as assertive, intelligent women with some almost masculine qualities by Victorian standards (for instance, Mina knows the train schedules, and Marjory recognizes that Archibald must reduce the cipher in order to crack it). Hopkins compares Mina Harker and Marjory Drake by designating them both as "uneasily poised between New Woman and proper wife", and by pointing out that "Marjory…like Mina, explicitly disavows any sympathy with the most prominent of the New Women's aims". Thus, the New Woman in Stoker's novels appears to be more of a tantalizing threat than a tangible reality. The somewhat rebellious qualities of these heroines are ultimately little more than pleasing additions that add interest to females who become more passive and surrender to the authority of their husbands. In general, Archibald (and presumably Stoker himself) is attracted to the New Woman, but wants to subdue her rather than to allow her to continue her independent existence.

=== Gendered conceptions of honor ===
Despite the importance of nationality and political loyalties in The Mystery of the Sea, Stoker presents honor as a force that can transcend both of these things. As with the tensions involved in nationality, Don Bernardino and Marjory are the most important characters when it comes to notions of honor. Don Bernardino is convinced that he has forfeited his masculine honor when he has failed to beat Archibald to the treasure. He warns Archibald that he may even resort to dishonorable tactics to win the treasure back, and the two men almost duel. However, when Marjory's womanly honor is in peril, Don Bernardino sets aside his concern for the treasure and sees a surer way to regaining his manly honor through helping to rescue Marjory. Andrew Smith recognizes this action as embodying "a notion of honor which is outside religious, political and moral sentiments", asserting that Stoker's view of possible reconciliation above national lines is "short on political pragmatism but big on nebulous notions of honor which are 'naturally' provoked by a sense of fair play". In many ways, this notion of honor contributes to the undermining of the New Woman in The Mystery of the Sea and is another remnant of the conventional Gothic within the novel's modern (for the time) political landscape. Honor is closely associated with gender ideals; Marjory is seen as needing protection from men who could steal her honor (although she does her share of fighting back), and Don Bernardino and Archibald are able to forget their differences to protect her honor while realizing their own. This gendered conception of honor persists to the very end of the novel; Don Bernardino dies in his noble efforts towards rescuing Marjory and reclaiming the treasure from the kidnappers, and is buried in the vault of his ancestors. Marjory, on the other hand, decides to rein in her independence and become a dedicated wife.

== Critical reception ==
The Mystery of the Sea received reasonably positive reviews around the time of its publication; the reviewers writing in 1902 tend to focus on Stoker's skill and the fact that the novel is an engaging read, admitting (in some cases reluctantly, others forcefully) that the novel is melodramatic and contains a somewhat disparate variety of elements. Most of these turn-of-the-century reviewers are quick to identify The Mystery of the Sea as a work of sensation, or at least as a work that contains sensational elements, and they are in general agreement that Stoker is a skilled writer of mystery. A reviewer writing for The Bookman calls the novel "one of those weirdly sensational stories that no living author writes better than Mr. Bram Stoker". The Dial categorizes it as "a bit of glowing melodrama" that will "keep one awake o' nights", and admits that it would be hard to get more action...between the covers of a book than will be found here" (an observation which other reviewers do not construe as positive). Punch praises Stoker's "breezy personality" and his ability to create a story with "the rare quality of adventure that enthralls the boys and pleases their parents". This same review is appreciative of Stoker's writing style and depictions of landscape as well. These reviews situate The Mystery of the Sea between the realm of light fiction or juvenile reading and more sophisticated mystery. Other reviewers recognize these same elements of melodrama, but do not characterize them as examples of Stoker's authorial skill. A sarcastic and somewhat hostile review from The Saturday Review says that the novel is "rather overcrowded", and proceeds to list off the tropes that Stoker employs from various genres. This reviewer admits that Stoker weaves the different strands together well, but that he is "hardly justified in framing such colossal machinery to produce results more simply attained by less ambitious sensationalists".

There are few recent works of scholarship and review done on The Mystery of the Sea. It has not received nearly as much critical attention as Dracula, and a common tactic for modern scholars writing about The Mystery of the Sea (as well as Stoker's other lesser-known works) is to compare it to Dracula. As with Dracula, recent scholars often seem to concentrate on possible subtexts behind the main plot of The Mystery of the Sea. They analyze such areas as Stoker's approach to femininity, the Gothic, historical events, or the use of technology. Carol Senf, for example, looks at the role of technology as a means of "salvation" and problem-solving for the hero, while Andrew Smith analyzes the Catholic-Protestant and racial tensions underlying the historical backdrop of the Spanish–American War. Lisa Hopkins analyzes perceptions of femininity, political tensions, setting, and parallel real-life events, pointing out a multitude of connections to Dracula. In general, modern scholars have shown that Stoker cannot escape the influence of his best-known work, but they have also demonstrated that The Mystery of the Sea is full of complex themes that are worthy of critical attention.
