= Bullers of Buchan =

Coordinates: 57.433°N 1.821°W

- Bullers of Buchan

- Location within Aberdeenshire
- OS grid reference: NK108380
- Council area: Aberdeenshire
- Lieutenancy area: Aberdeenshire
- Country: Scotland
- Sovereign state: United Kingdom
- Post town: PETERHEAD
- Postcode district: AB42
- Dialling code: 01779
- Police: Scotland
- Fire: Scottish
- Ambulance: Scottish
- UK Parliament: Aberdeenshire North and Moray East
- Scottish Parliament: Banffshire and Buchan

The name Bullers of Buchan refers both to a collapsed sea cave and to the adjacent village, situated about 6 miles (9.7 km) south of Peterhead in Buchan, Aberdeenshire, Scotland.

== Cave ==
The collapsed sea cave forms an almost circular chasm (the "pot") some 30 metres (98 ft) deep, where the sea rushes in through a natural archway.

== Village ==
The small hamlet of cottages here is also known by the same name, and was historically a fishing village launching small boats from the bay below (the slipway may still be seen at low tide).

== Cliffs ==
The cliffs at the Bullers coast provide a nesting site in spring for colonies of seabirds, including kittiwakes, puffins, fulmars, shags, razorbills and guillemots along with herring gulls and great black-backed gulls. Eider ducks may also be seen here, and gannets are frequently seen passing en route to their colonies north at Troup Head and south at the Bass Rock. Grey seals may be seen in the bay, and dolphins are often seen passing by offshore. The Bullers of Buchan Coast are designated a Site of Special Scientific Interest by NatureScot due to their geology, due to the cliff habitats, and due to the bird species that nest on the cliffs.

== Access ==
The area is a popular sightseeing spot, with a car park but no tourist facilities. Access is via the A975 road, which is served by a regular bus service between Peterhead and Aberdeen.

The Bullers of Buchan lie on the Buchan coastal footpath, leading south to Slains Castle, Cruden Bay and Whinnyfold, and north to the Longhaven wildlife reserve.

== Name ==
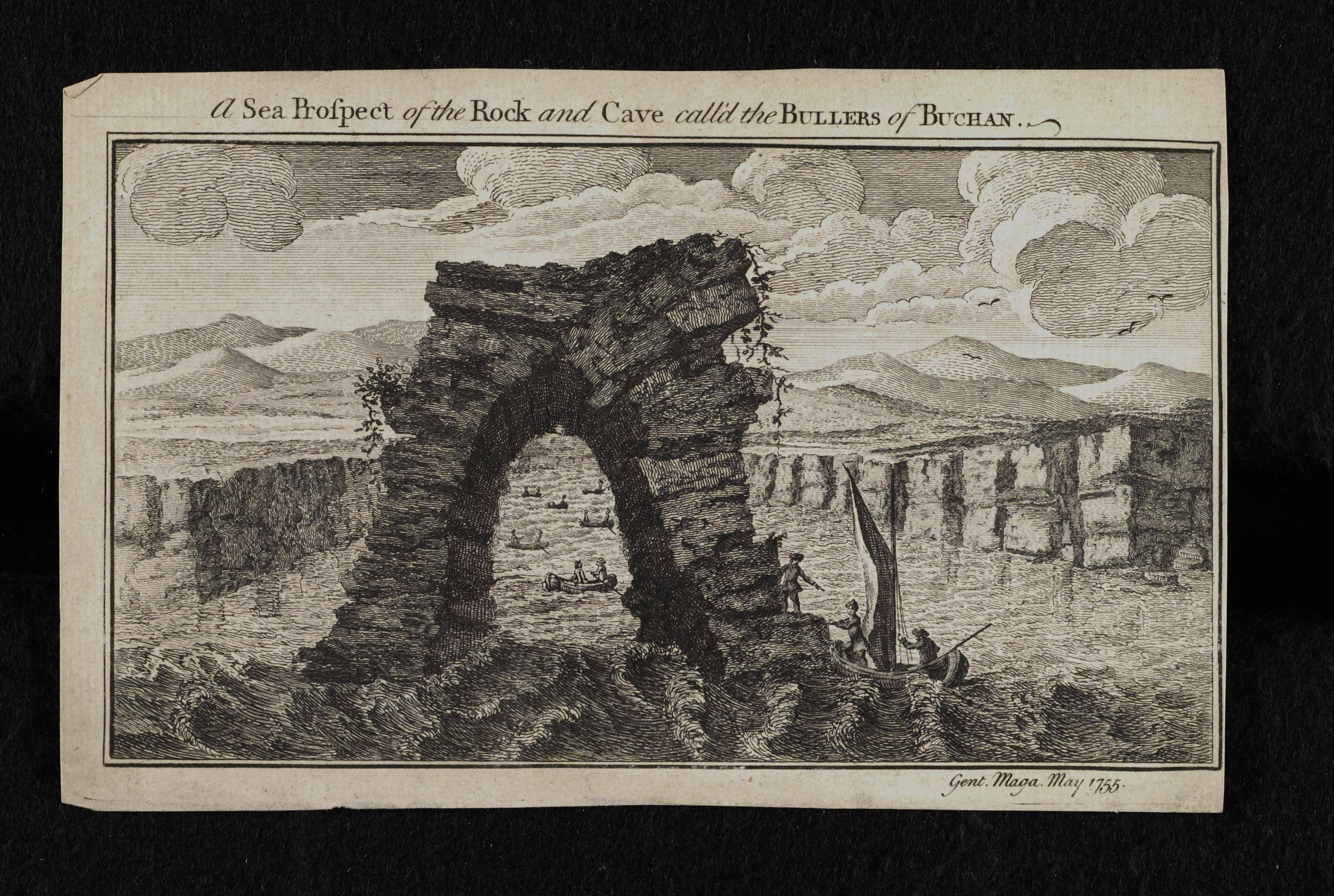
Engraving of the Bullers of Buchan (sea prospect), 1755

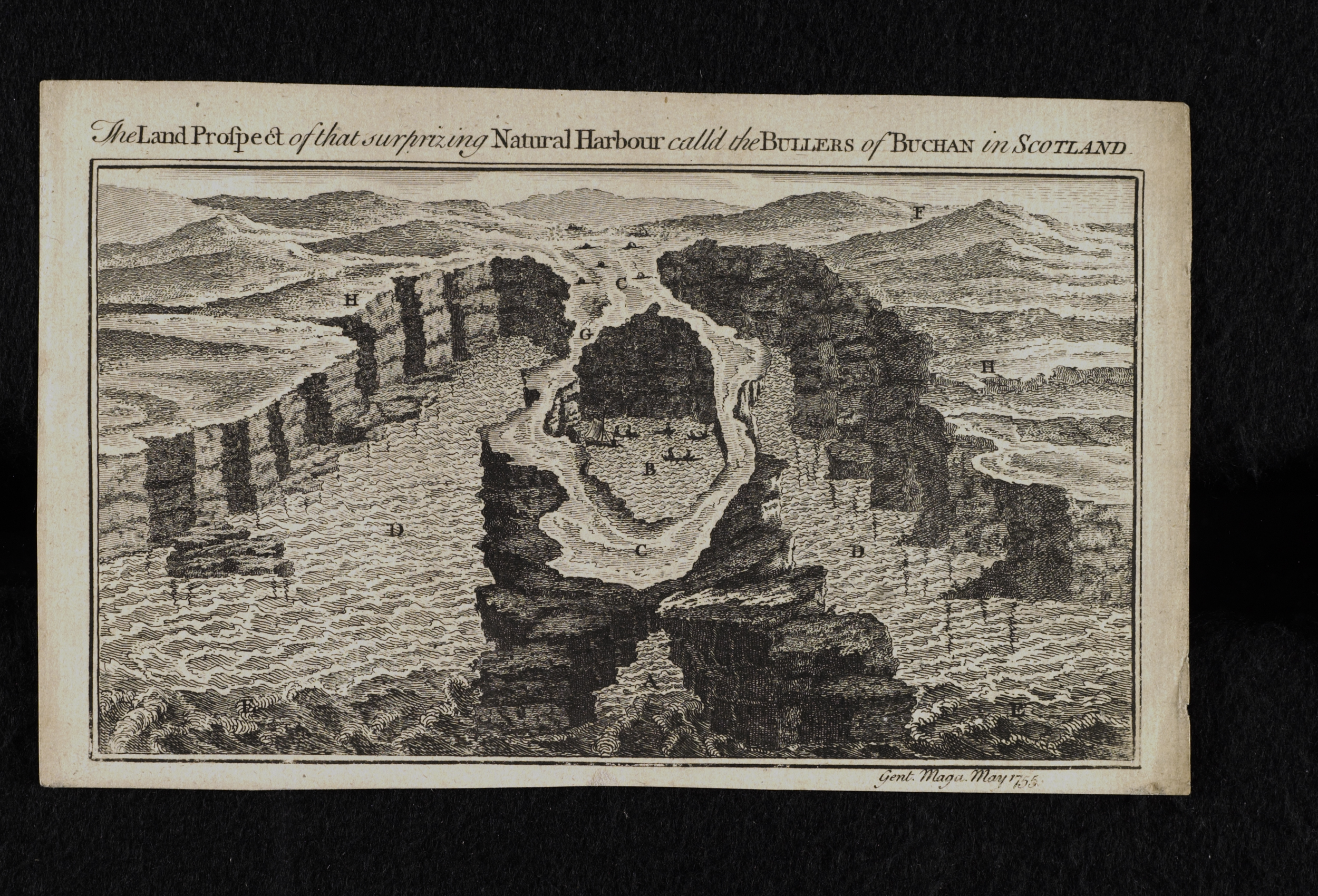
Engraving of the natural harbour at Bullers of Buchan, 1755

The name "Bullers" has been thought to be derived from the French "bouillir", meaning "to boil", as the water in the pot appears to boil during stormy weather, but another explanation says that the word is a Scots word meaning "rushing of water", relating to the sound made by the waves crashing in through the archway opening into the pot, perhaps.

== History ==
The local area is rich with prehistory and historical features. Somewhat inland are a number of prehistoric monuments including Catto Long Barrow, Silver Cairn and numerous tumuli. In that same vicinity of the Laeca Burn watershed is the point d'appui of historic battles between invading Danes and indigenous Picts.

The Bullers of Buchan were cited in historical literature as early as the 18th century, most notably by the literary journalist James Boswell.

The Annual Reports of the Fishery Board for Scotland provide an insight into fishing in Bullers of Buchan in the years before the First World War. In the report for 1902 we learn that it was "never very much of a fishing creek, only two boats being left" , while in the Report for 1912, we learn that "There are no regular fishermen at this creek".

Fishery Statistics

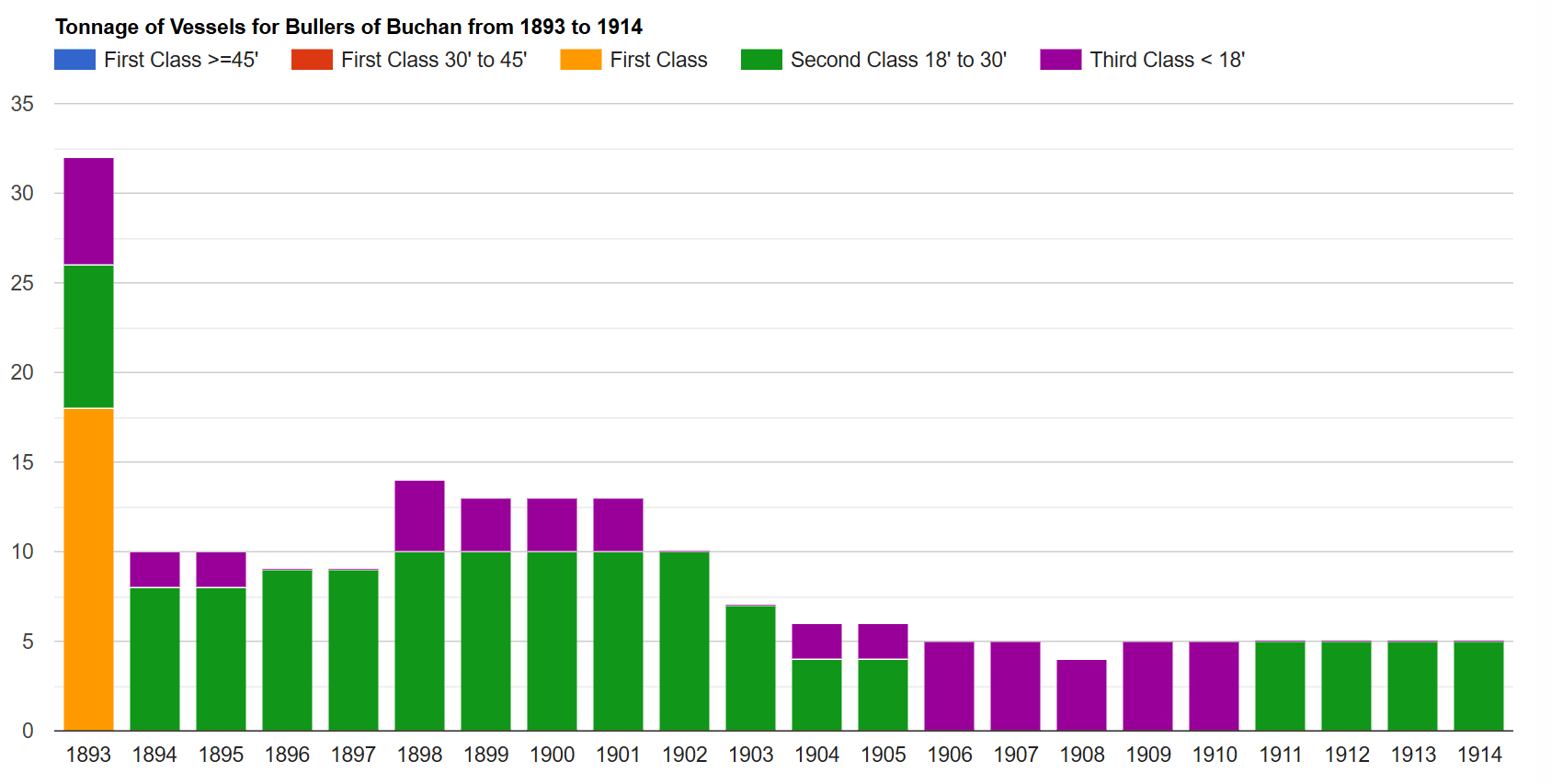
Tonnage of vessels

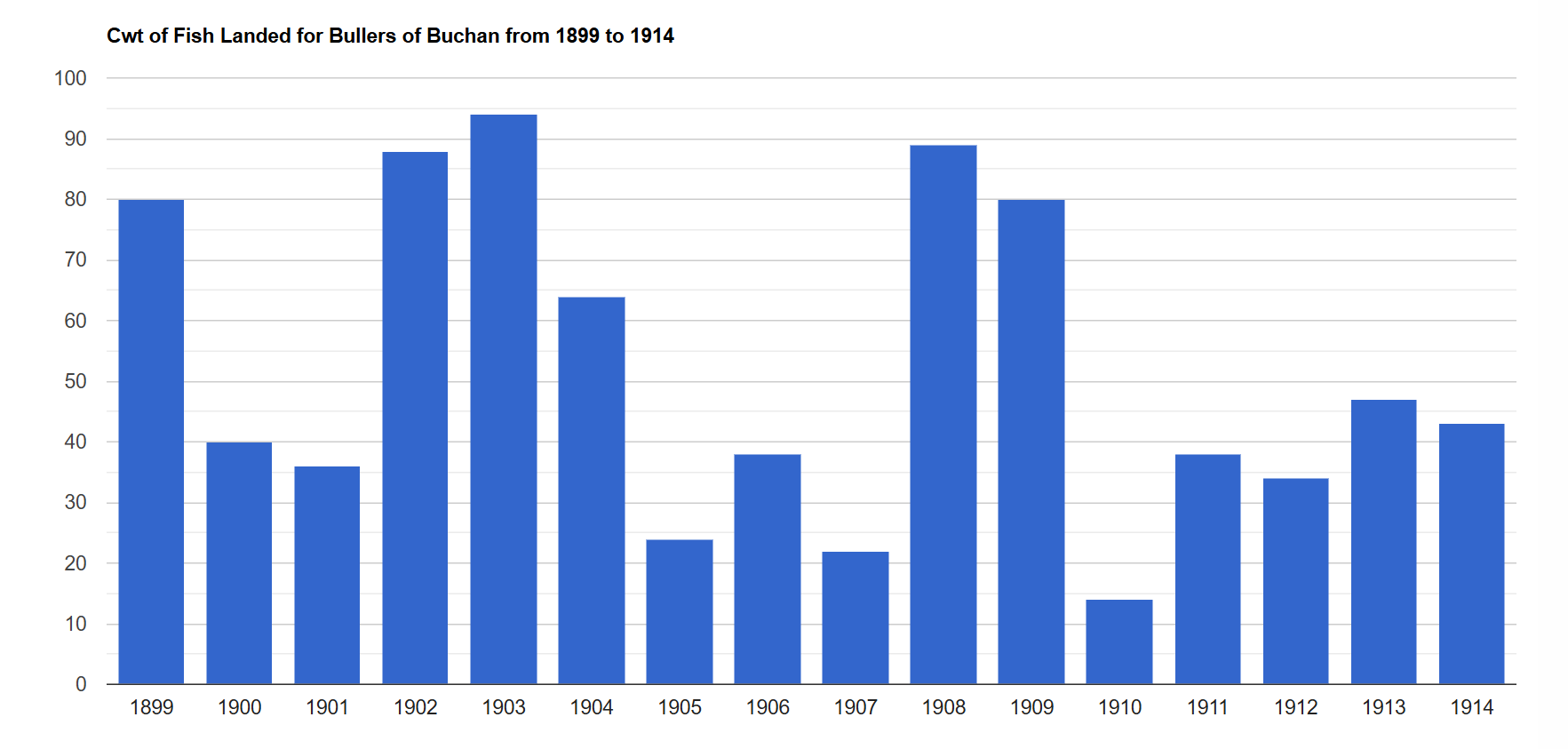
Cwt of fish landed

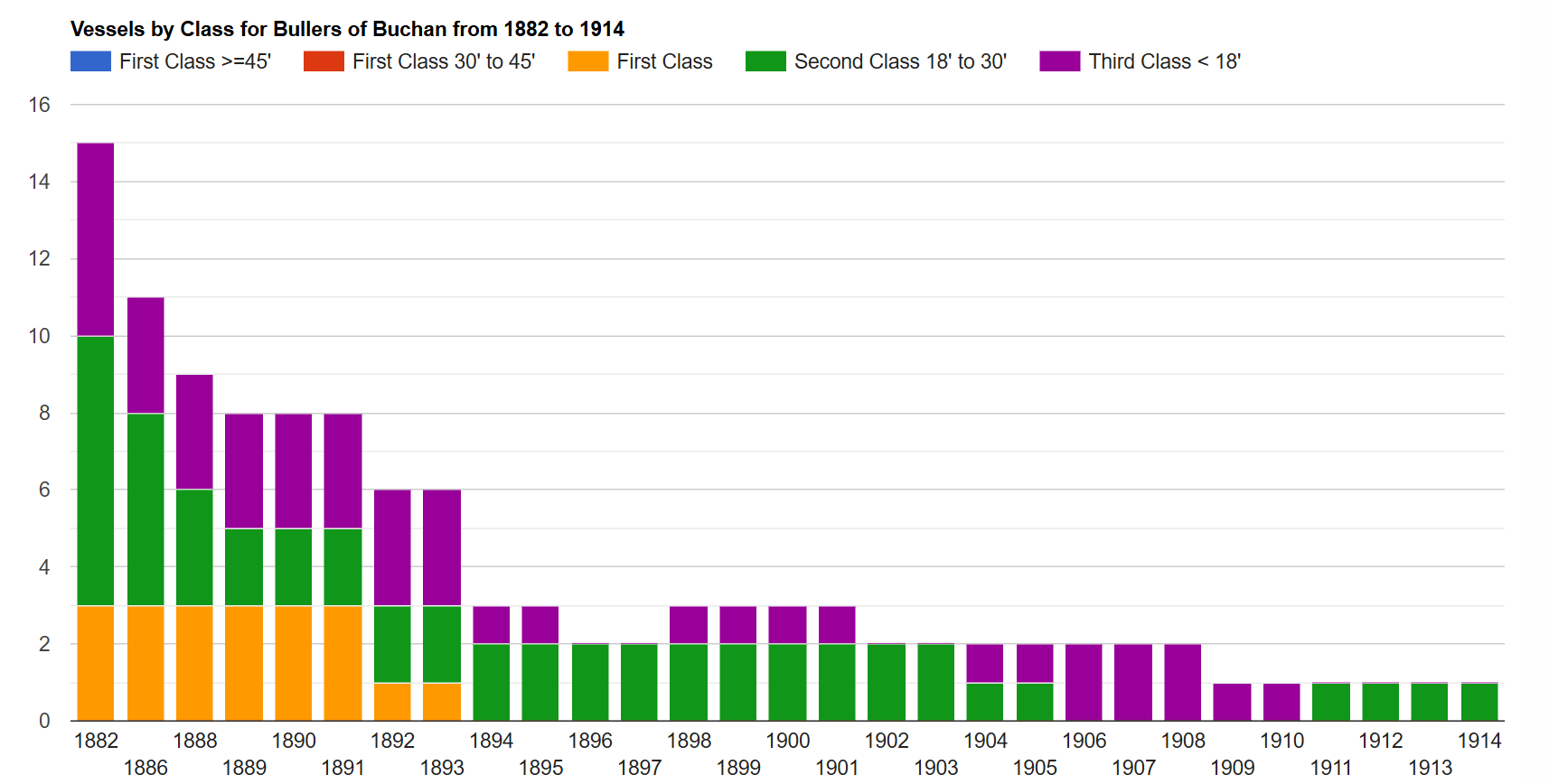
Vessels by class

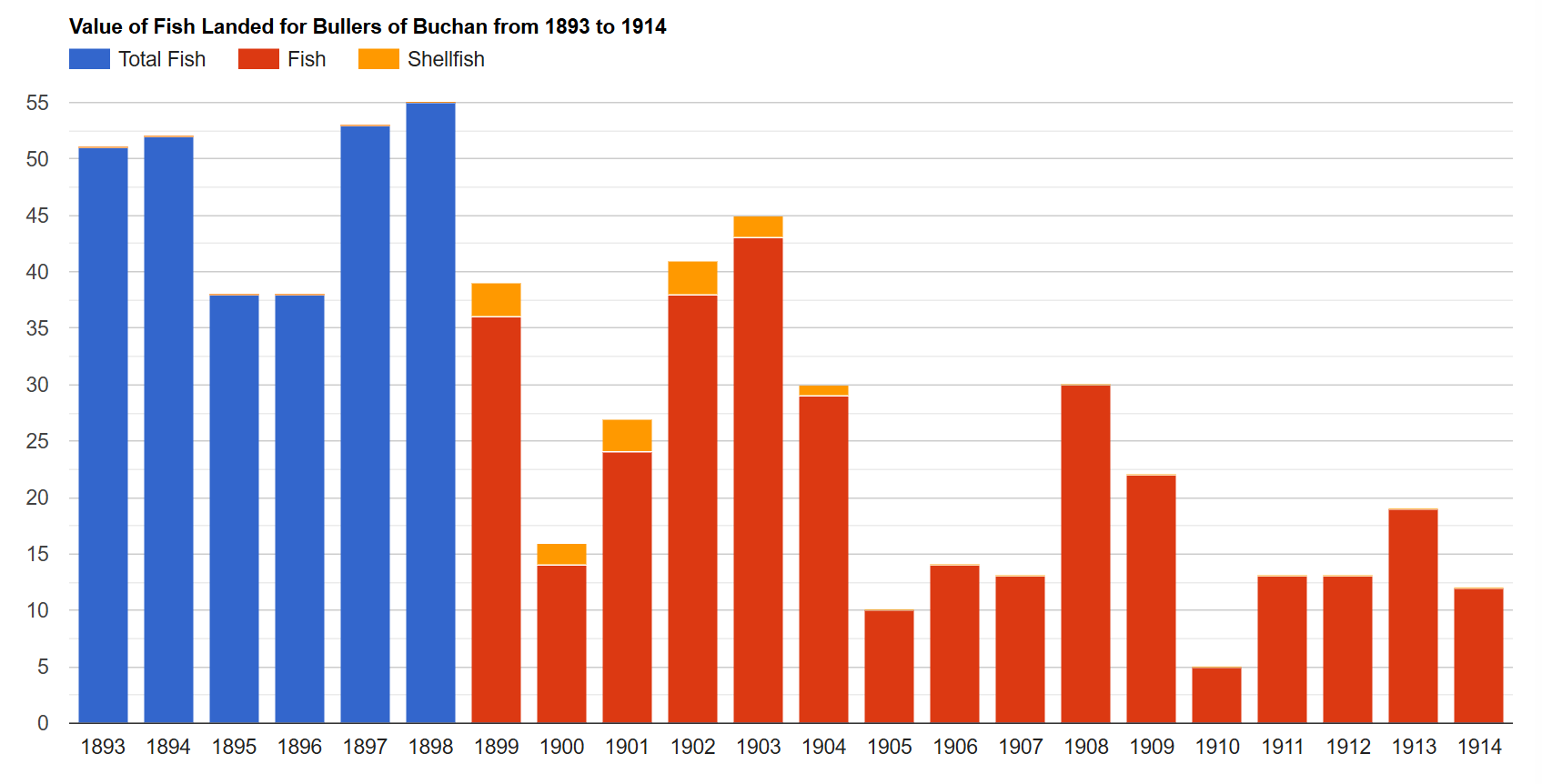
Value (£) of fish landed

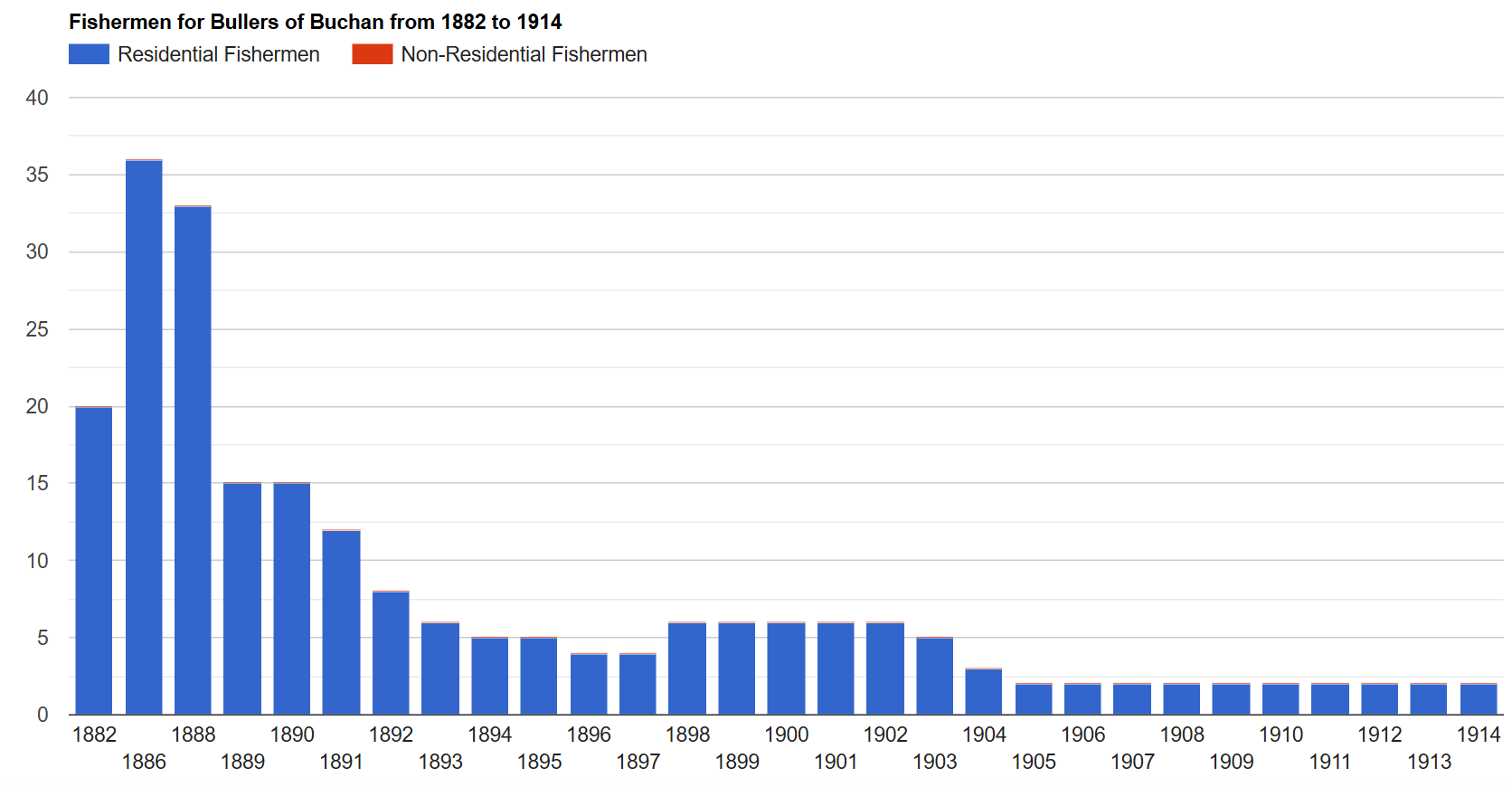
Fishermen

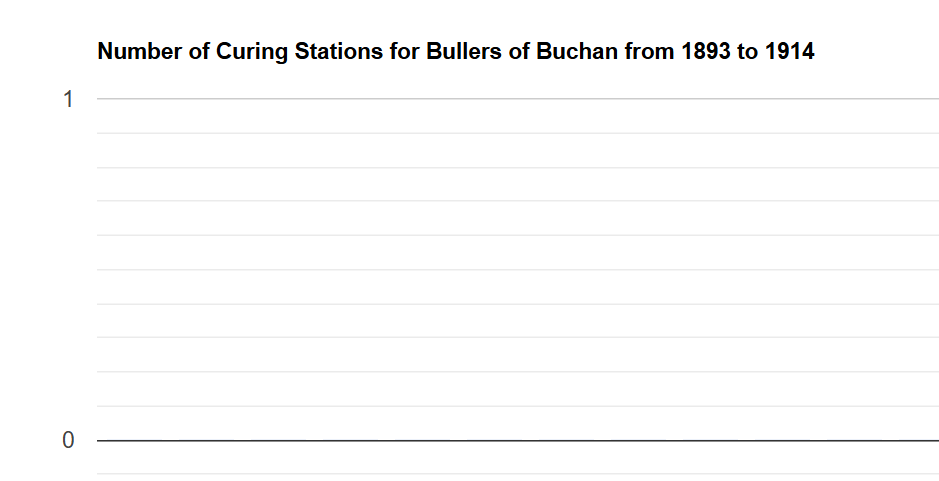
Placeholder - no curing stations

The Great North of Scotland Railway opened a halt at Bullers O'Buchan in 1900 to serve the needs of visitors to the site. The station closed in 1932.

== See also ==
- Catto Long Barrow
- Laeca Burn
