= Cruden Bay =

Coordinates: 57.417254°N 1.852485°W

Cruden Bay: Scottish Gaelic: Inbhir Chruidein
- Location within Aberdeenshire
- Population: 1,570 (2020)
- OS grid reference: NK089363
- Council area: Aberdeenshire
- Lieutenancy area: Aberdeenshire
- Country: Scotland
- Sovereign state: United Kingdom
- Post town: PETERHEAD
- Postcode district: AB42
- Dialling code: 01779 81
- Police: Scotland
- Fire: Scottish
- Ambulance: Scottish
- UK Parliament: Aberdeenshire North and Moray East
- Scottish Parliament: Aberdeenshire East

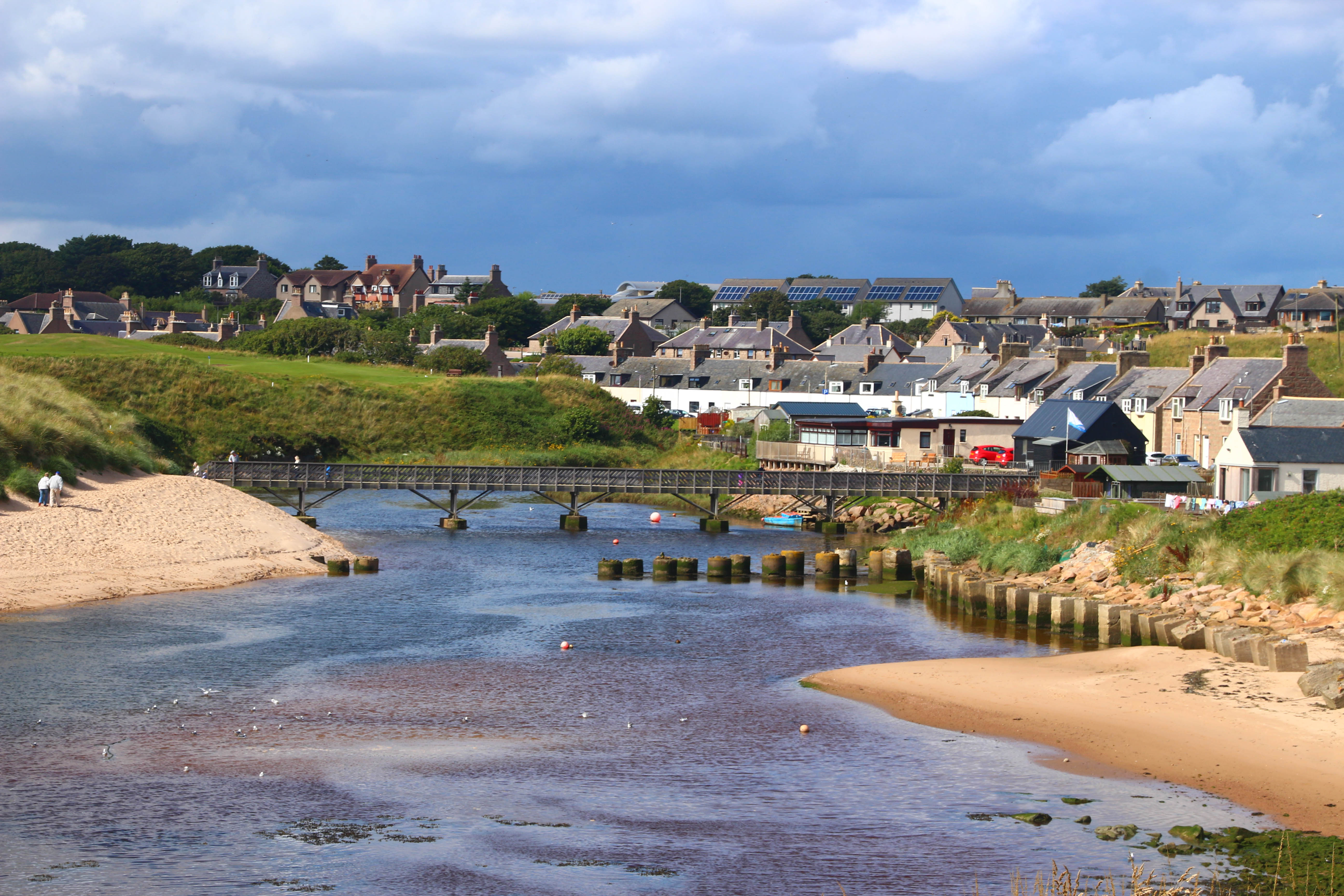
View of Cruden Bay.

Cruden Bay is a small village in Scotland, on the north coast of the Bay of Cruden in Aberdeenshire, 26 miles (42 km) north of Aberdeen.

Just west of Slains Castle, local tradition associates Cruden Bay with a supposed battle in which the Scots under King Malcolm II are said to have defeated the Danes in 1012; however, such accounts are regarded by historians as unsubstantiated and derive from much later sources. A traditional but unsubstantiated folk etymology derives the name from the Gaelic Croch Dain ('slaughter of Danes').

Today, Cruden Bay attracts tourists with its hotels and golf course. It has a long, unspoiled, beach made famous by Norwegian aviator Tryggve Gran, who made the first solo flight across the North Sea.

== Literary associations ==
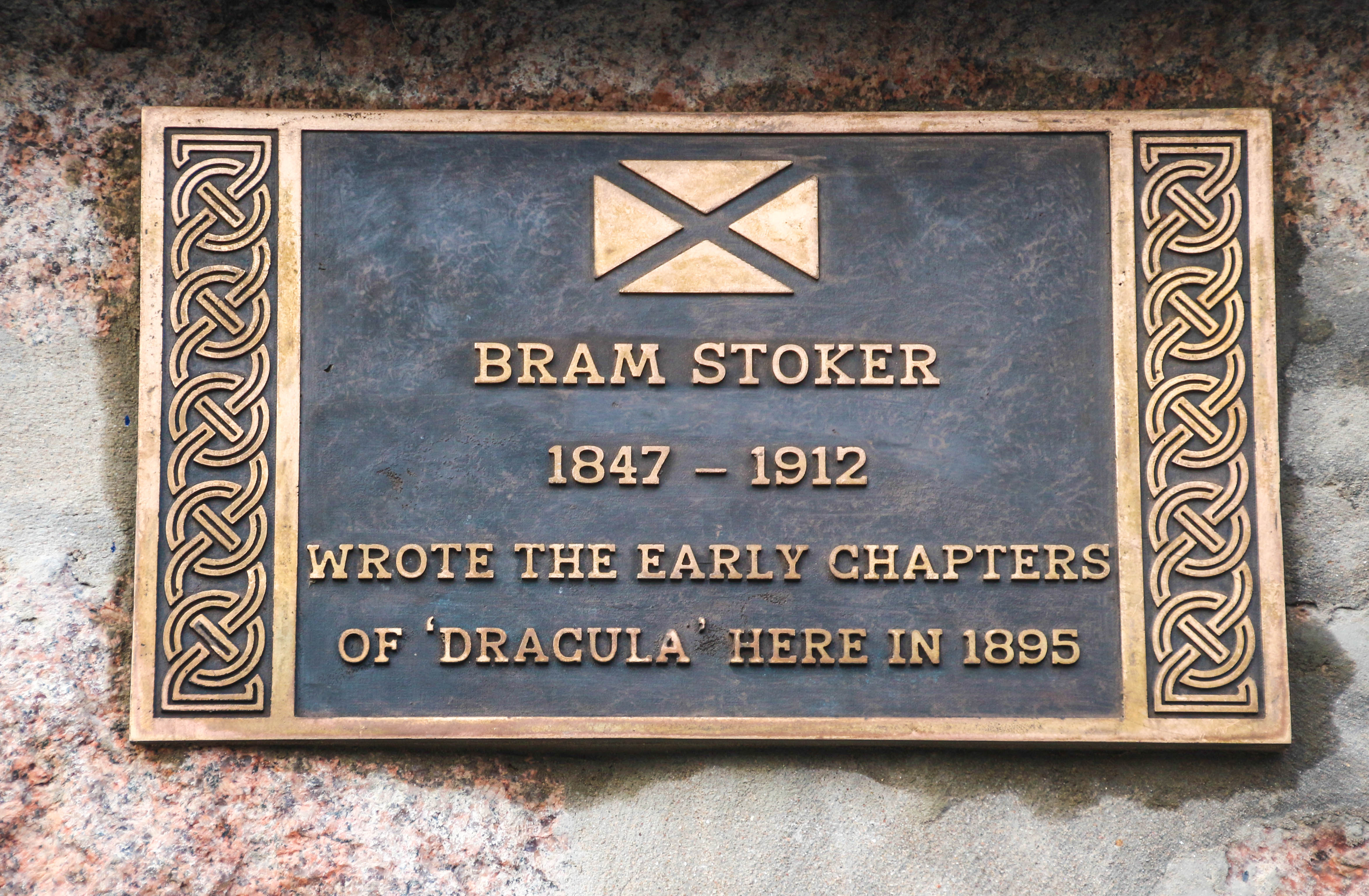
Bram Stoker plaque on the Kilmarnock Arms Hotel, Cruden Bay.

The village has associations with various figures in literature.

Dr Samuel Johnson and James Boswell were guests at Slains Castle in 1773. Johnson said that "no man can see with indifference" the sea chasm known as the Bullers of Buchan, which is near the village.

Dun Bay, or Yellow Rock is also near the Bullers of Buchan, and is associated with Walter Scott's The Antiquary.

Bram Stoker was a regular visitor between 1892 and 1910. An article in the Buchan Observer from 1897 discusses how he discovered the village:

Cruden has an enthusiastic friend in Mr Bram Stoker, Sir Henry Irving’s manager. Mr Stoker (says a London correspondent), made the acquaintance of the district – as he tells me – by accident. He wanted to find a bracing place far north on the east coast. From a large ordnance map and the geological formations, he knew that some such place must lie between Peterhead and Aberdeen. Accordingly, he went to Peterhead and walked down the coast, and when he saw Cruden he telegraphed to his family to come on to the Kilmarnock Arms Hotel. Mr Stoker has been there every summer since then, and hopes some day to have at Cruden his own pied-à-terre.

Because he was a part-time writer, his Cruden Bay holidays provided him with the largest amount of spare time to write his books. He stayed at the Kilmarnock Arms Hotel in 1892 and 1894, and thereafter in cottages in Cruden Bay and Whinnyfold. The early chapters of Dracula were written in Cruden Bay, and possibly most of the rest of it was too. He also set two novels in and around the village, The Watter's Mou' (1895) and The Mystery of the Sea (1902). His 1894 short story "Crooken Sands" is set in Cruden Bay.

James Macpherson’s poem The Highlander (1758), a historical epic drawing on Scottish history and tradition, has been linked in later tradition with the supposed battle of Cruden.

== Early area history ==
Earliest nearby human traces are evident in nearby Catto Long Barrow, a massive stone structure now surrounded by agricultural fields.

The nearby cliff top Slains Castle was begun in 1597 and partly demolished in the 1920s. Bishop's Bridge spans Cruden Water and dates from 1697.

William Hay, 18th Earl of Erroll, established the fishing community of Port Erroll in the 1840s and 1850s. A functional harbour at the mouth of the Water of Cruden was added in the 1870s. Before that a tiny, long-abandoned hamlet of rudimentary fisher cottages, simply known as Ward, stood exposed on top of Ward Hill, just above the harbour site. There was also a parish school since 1606, housed in the two-storey Erroll Schoolhouse from 1834; the Presbyterian Church dedicated to Saint Olaf or commonly called the Old Kirk—built in 1776, with distinctive conical towers added in 1833—and Saint James Episcopal Church, notably the first structure designed by architect William Hay on top of Chapel Hill in 1842.

== Fishing community and seaside resort ==
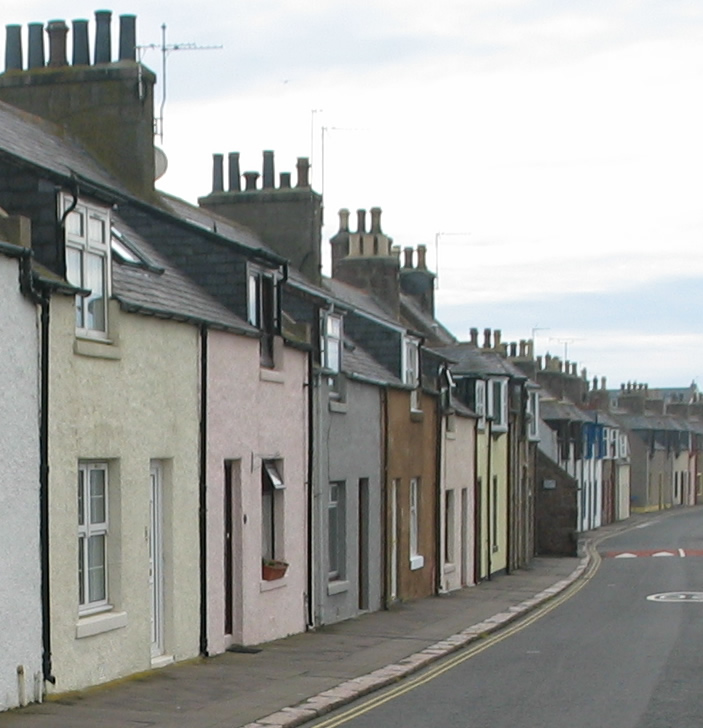
Harbour Street, Cruden Bay

Port Erroll developed as a fishing community to some extent but the tidal nature of the harbour restricted the size of craft which could operate from it and the village missed out on the herring boom. Tourism provided another source of income for the village. Even before the coming of the railway, the long pink curve of the Bay of Cruden sands and scenic cliffscapes to the north were attracting visitors and a small seaside resort was grafting itself onto the fishing community. The Cruden Bay Golfing Society, founded in 1791, played on the open links.

== The coming and going of the railway ==
The railway brought grandeur but not lasting prosperity, to Cruden Bay. The Boddam branch line from Ellon to Boddam near Peterhead was opened in 1897, along with the golf course and the 55-bedroom Cruden Bay Hotel two years later. The Cruden Bay Hotel Tramway was added linking the station and hotel. The Great North of Scotland Railway Company promoted Cruden Bay as a Brighton of the North, only twelve hours from London and an ideal escape for gentry and nouveau riche; despite initial enthusiasm, neither railway nor hotel prospered. The railway was closed to passengers in 1932 and in 1939 the hotel was requisitioned as an army hospital: it was not re-opened after the war and demolished around 1950. Cruden Bay remains a golfing destination and the village sustains three smaller hotels. Although the harbour area and the local primary school are still styled "Port Errol", the railway adventure put the name Cruden Bay firmly on the map.

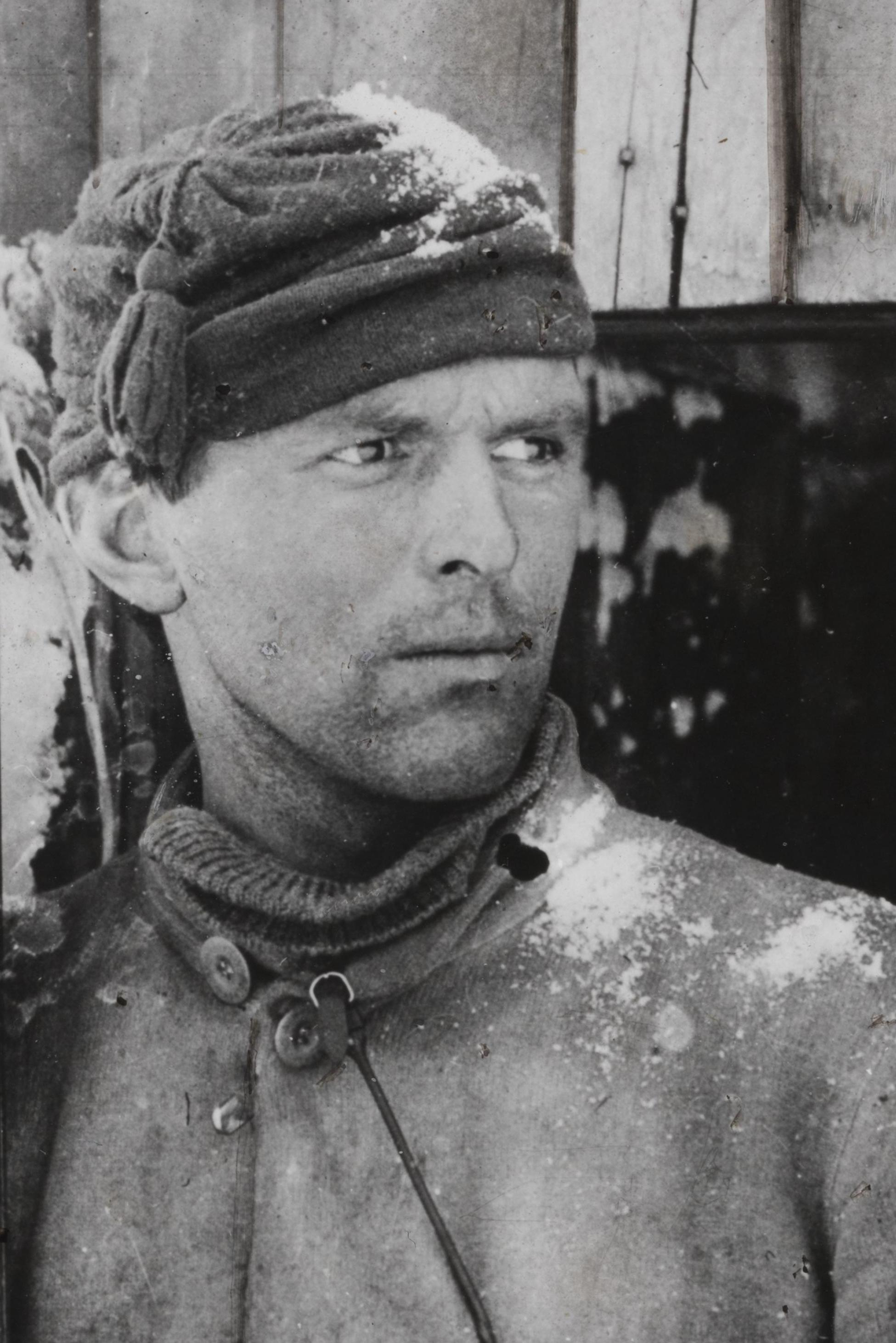
Tryggve Gran, c.1912–1913

== Record-breaking flight across North Sea ==
On 30 July 1914 the Norwegian polar explorer and flyer Tryggve Gran became the first aeroplane pilot to cross the North Sea. Taking off from Cruden Bay in his Blériot XI-2 monoplane, named Ca Flotte (it was equipped with air cushions in case of ditching) Gran landed 4 hours 10 minutes later at Jæren, near Stavanger, Norway, after a flight of 320 miles (510 km).

This record-breaking achievement, the longest flight over water to date by a heavier-than air machine, (Note: Longer flights had been made: for example, Roland Garros flew non-stop across the Mediterranean in September 1913 from Fréjus, France, to Bizerte, Tunisia in a flight lasting nearly eight hours, but he overflew Sardinia for much of the way.) was overshadowed by the outbreak of World War I only five days later.

== Cruden Bay today ==
The 1950s and 1960s was a period of rapid population decline for Cruden Bay but the coming of North Sea oil to north-east Scotland, with its attendant jobs and families looking for places to settle, reinvigorated the village; thereafter, the population rose again, with new housing added near the defunct brickworks, the site of the demolished Cruden Bay Hotel and along the water of Cruden at Morrison Place. These days Cruden Bay serves mainly as a dormitory village for the important settlements of Peterhead to the north and Aberdeen to the south. The eighteenth century timbered salmon station still operates and some seasonal commercial fishing continues.

Cruden Bay has a medium-sized primary school. Secondary pupils are bussed to nearby Peterhead Academy. There are a few small shops, a chemist/newsagent, a post office/hardware, a craft shop and a general store. There is also a Chinese takeaway, a medical surgery and a library. There are also many sports facilities, tennis courts, and two football pitches which house Cruden Bay Juniors FC. The school and public hall house a number of youth groups such as Girlguiding UK. There is a Congregational Church in the village centre and just outside the village there is a Scottish Episcopalian Church and a Church of Scotland parish. Cruden Bay is not far from the towns of Ellon and Peterhead, and is about 30 minutes drive from Aberdeen City.

Holiday makers are served by 2 hotels, a pub and bed and breakfasts. Attractions for visitors include the beach, the golf course of the Cruden Bay Golf Club (ranked #29 nationwide).

== Oil pipeline ==
Although there is little evidence of its presence other than a small complex a few miles south of the village, the sands at Cruden Bay is the place where the 110-mile (180 km) long Forties pipeline operated by Ineos, in use from 1975, finds landfall. It pumps crude oil from the Forties oilfield to Whinnyfold, then by overland pipeline to Grangemouth.

== Amenities ==
- Primary school with pre-school nursery
- Library
- Post office / General store
- Newsagent / General store
- Medical Practice
- Pharmacy
- Golf course
- Bed and breakfasts
- Self-catering accommodation
- Two hotels
- Public house
- Chinese take-away

== See also ==
- Bogbrae
- Laeca Burn
- Catto Long Barrow
