= Water of Cruden =

River in Aberdeenshire, Scotland

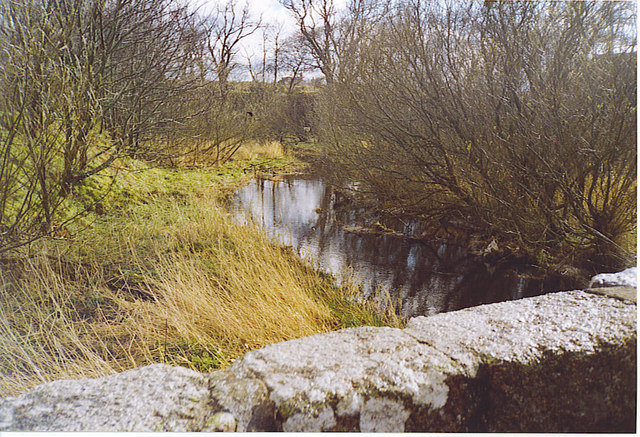
- Water of Cruden from Bishop's Bridge

Location
- Country: Scotland
- Council area: Highland

Physical characteristics
- Source: Countryside north of Ellon
- Mouth: North Sea
  - location: Cruden Bay
  - coordinates: 57°24′46″N 1°50′51″W

The Water of Cruden is a short broadly east-flowing river in Buchan in northeast Scotland. Its headwaters streams rise in the countryside north of Ellon and combine to flow through the village of Hatton and onward to the village of Cruden Bay where it then enters the North Sea at the north end of the Bay of Cruden. It is crossed at various points by the A952, A90 and A975 roads. The harbour of Port Erroll stands at the point that the tidal channel enters the sea. The name Cruden is said to derive from Gaelic 'croch Dain' signifying the 'slaughter of the Danes. referencing the Battle of Cruden.

The course of the lowest section of the river was diverted in the 19th century; it is shown in John Thomson's Atlas of Scotland, 1832, as reaching the sea at what is now termed Old Water Moo', a gorge inlet on a peninsula north of the Bay of Cruden. An 1872 Ordnance Survey map shows the river flowing into the Bay of Cruden. The OS name book for Aberdeenshire notes the diversion in its entry for Old Water Moo', a sea inlet into which the river once discharged.
