= Whinnyfold =

Coastal village in Aberdeenshire, Scotland

Coordinates: 57°23′21″N 1°52′4″W

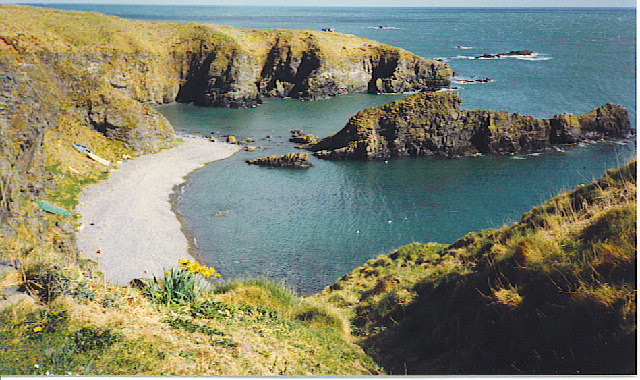
- The bay at Whinnyfold in 1990, still with boats pulled up on the beach

- Location within Aberdeenshire
- Council area: Aberdeenshire
- Country: Scotland
- Sovereign state: United Kingdom
- Police: Scotland
- Fire: Scottish
- Ambulance: Scottish

Whinnyfold or Whinneyfold is a small coastal village at the southern end of the Bay of Cruden in Aberdeenshire, Scotland (grid reference NK 085 268).

Whinnyfold (locally pronounced finnyfa) is a clifftop hamlet of fisher cottages built in the 1860s, replacing an older settlement one mile inland. Whinnyfold has no harbour, and fisherfolk had to scramble up and down a steep grass slope to access their boats and catches. Nevertheless, in the nineteenth century and the first decades of the twentieth century it was a thriving fishing community, supporting as many as 190 fishermen operating 24 boats and exporting fish as far afield as Manchester.

During the herring boom the fishers abandoned the village for the summer season, seeking more lucrative employment in Peterhead. Those who remained temporarily converted a few of the cottages into tearooms serving holidaymakers visiting Cruden Bay. Among the visitors was Bram Stoker, author of Dracula.

Near the village, just off the south end of the Cruden sands, lies the treacherous area of semi-submerged rocks known as the Skares, the site of many shipwrecks and source of local lore, and inspiration to Stoker's novel The Mystery of the Sea.

Mechanisation of fishing and ever larger vessels, plus the impracticality of the site and the loss of rail links to key markets, put an end to commercial fishing at Whinnyfold. Today the village remains small and without amenities, served for local shops, school, medical practice and even public telephone by nearby Cruden Bay.

== Fishing ==
The Annual Reports of the Fishery Board for Scotland provide an insight into the fishing from Whinnyfold in the years before the First World War. The report for 1899 states that "there is a slight decrease in men and boats at this creek. The line fishing is carried out in small boats, and the large boats fish from Peterhead." The next report states that "this creek also shows a decrease in men and boats. Owing to the failure of the line fishing, several crews have sold their boats and found other employment".

Fishery Statistics

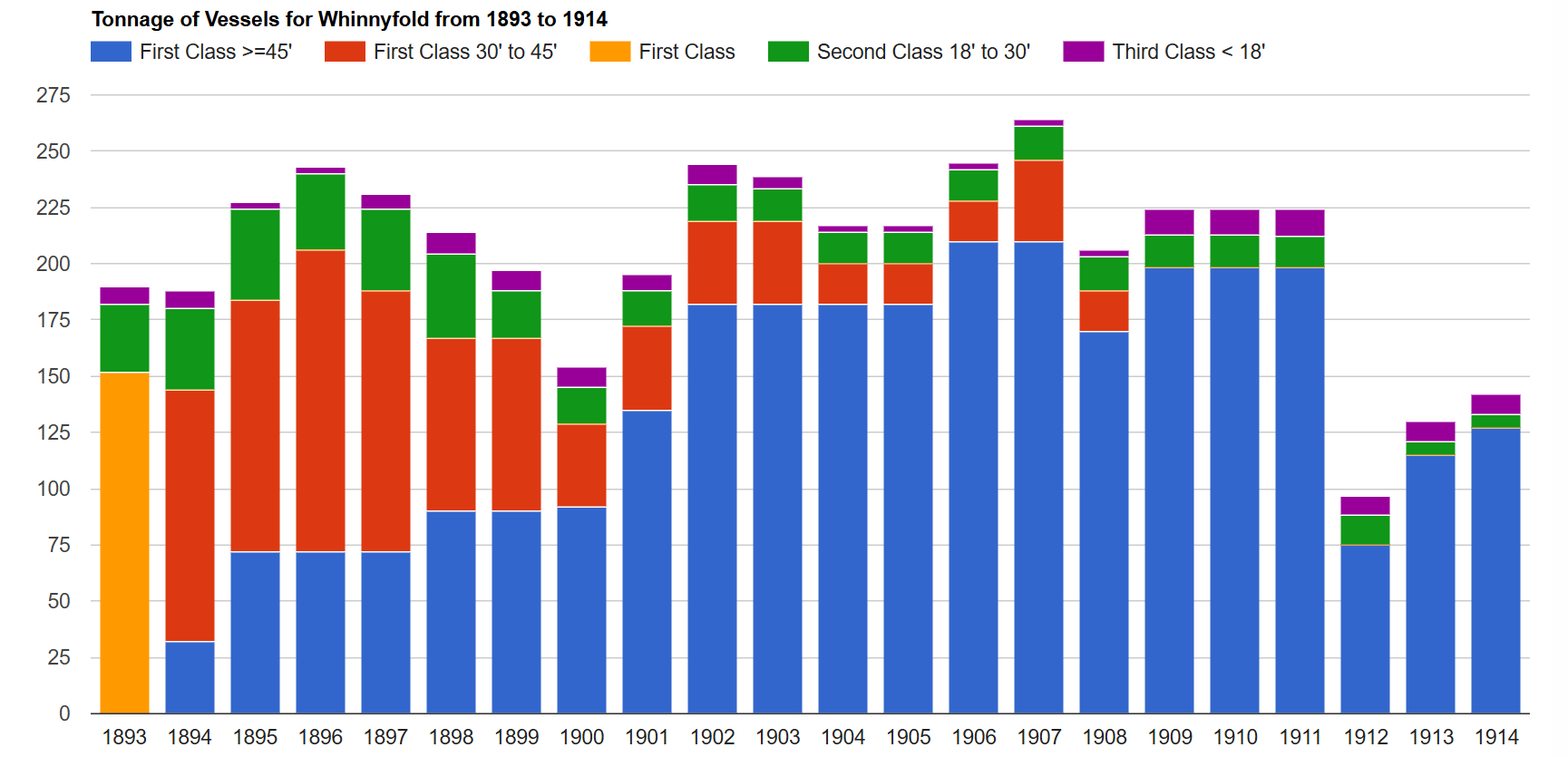
Tonnage of vessels

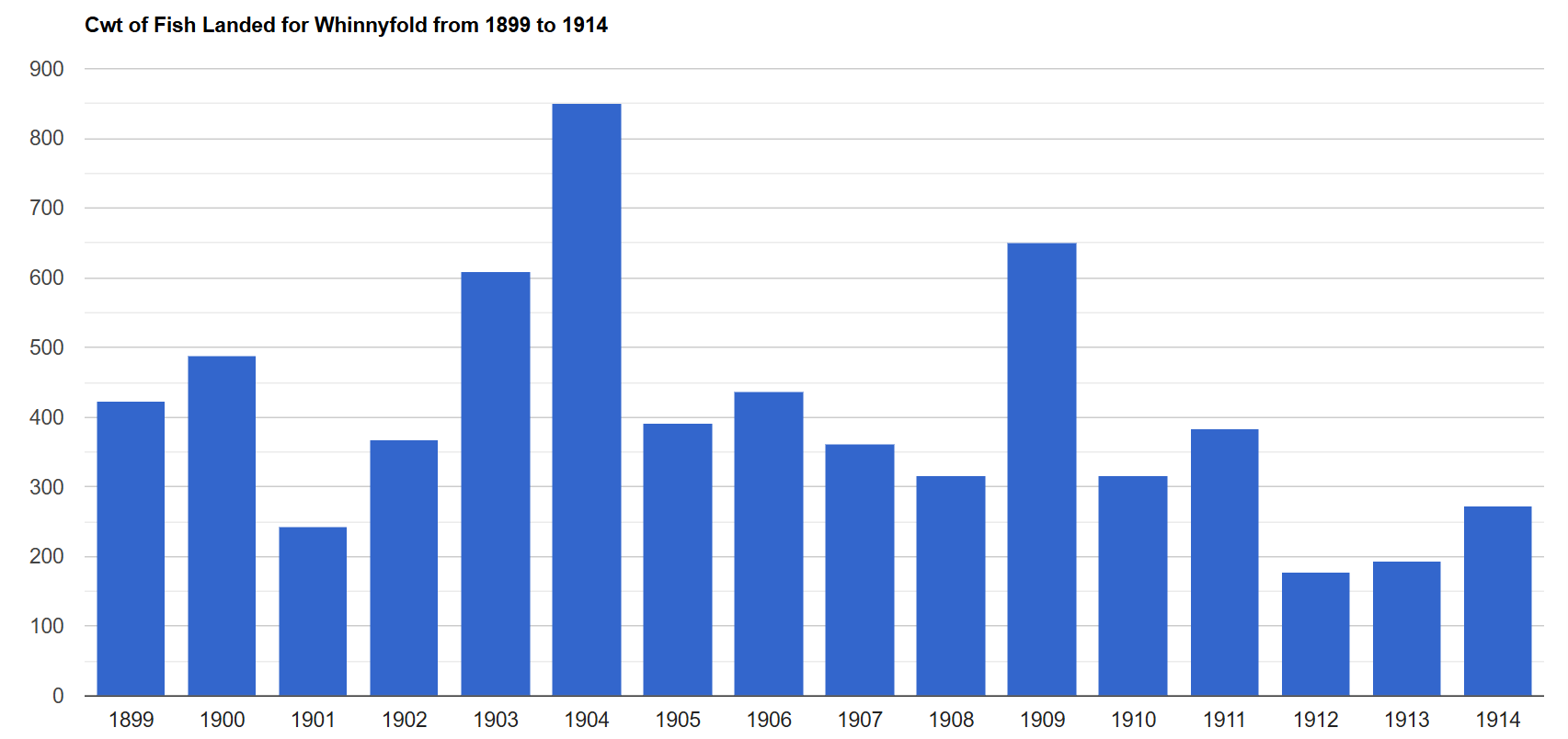
Cwt of fish landed

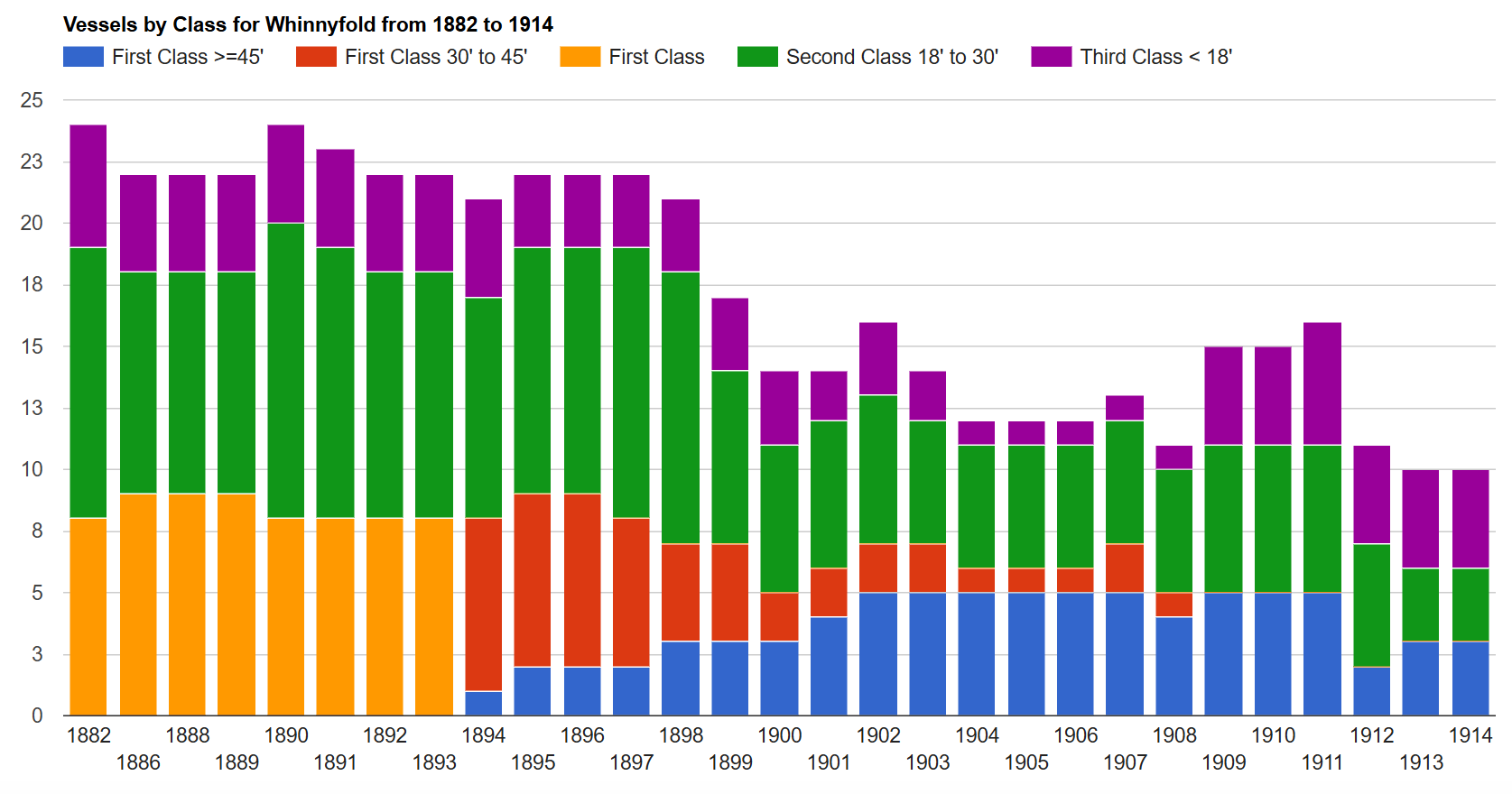
Vessels by class

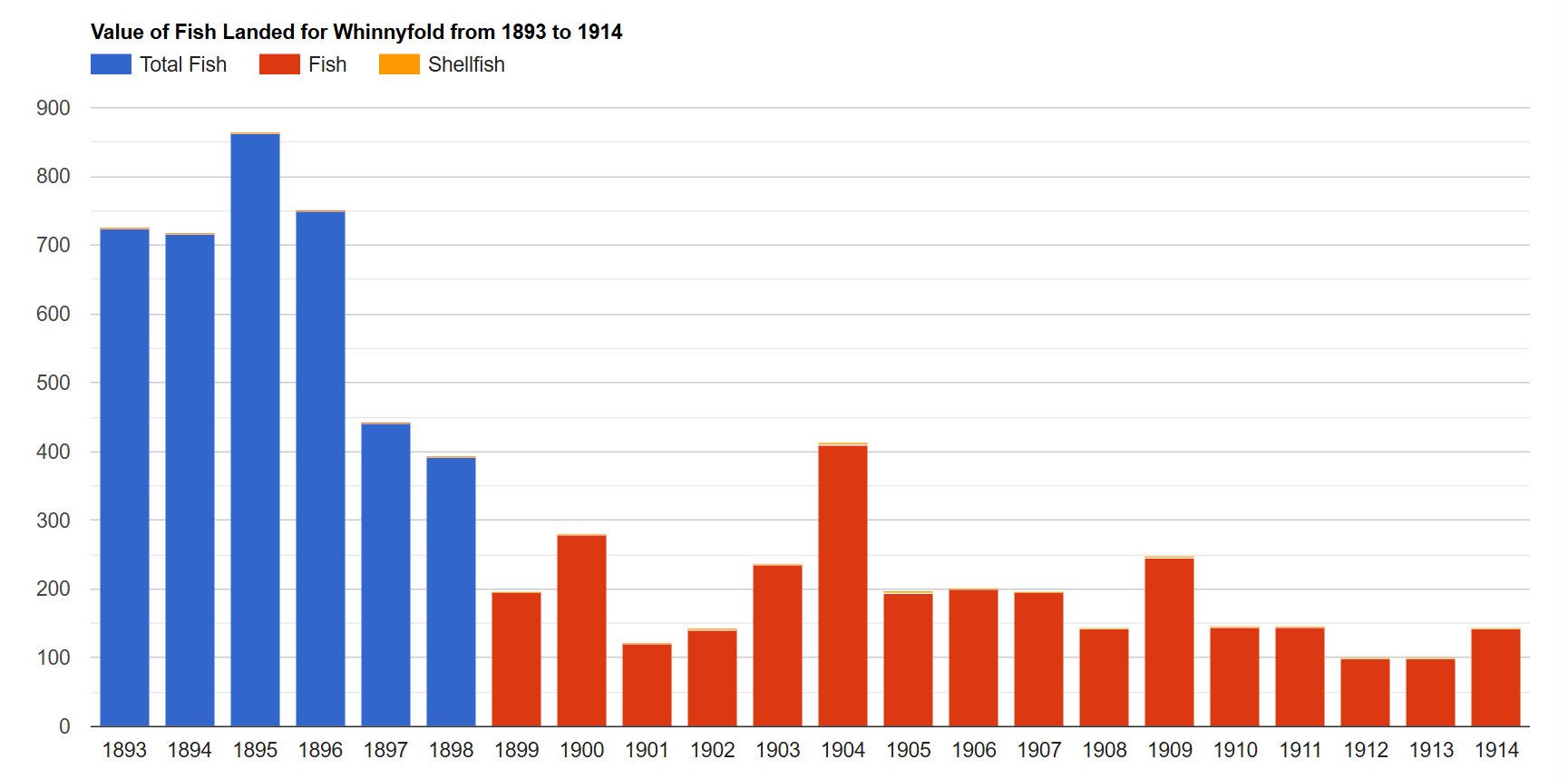
Value (£] of fish landed

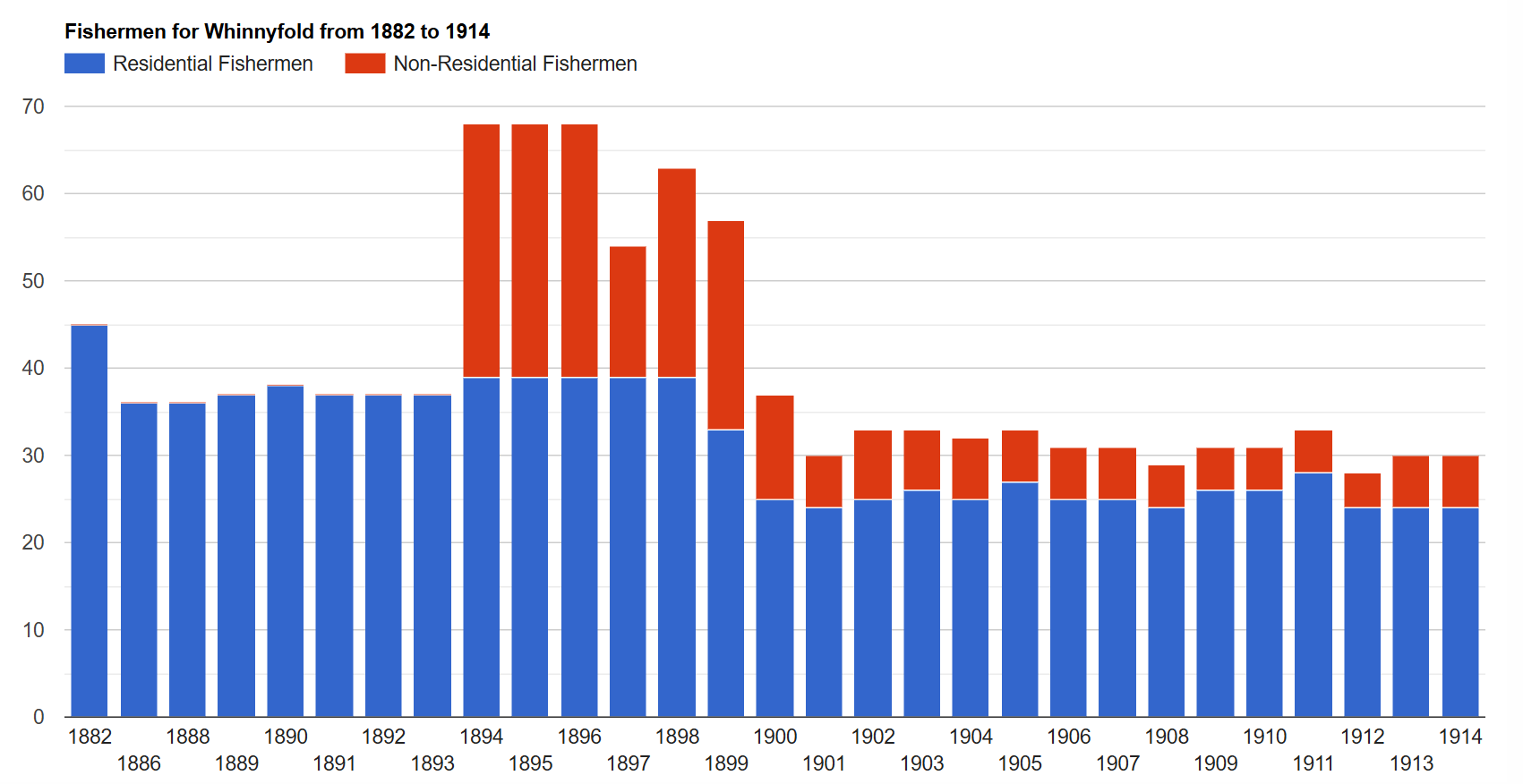
Fishermen

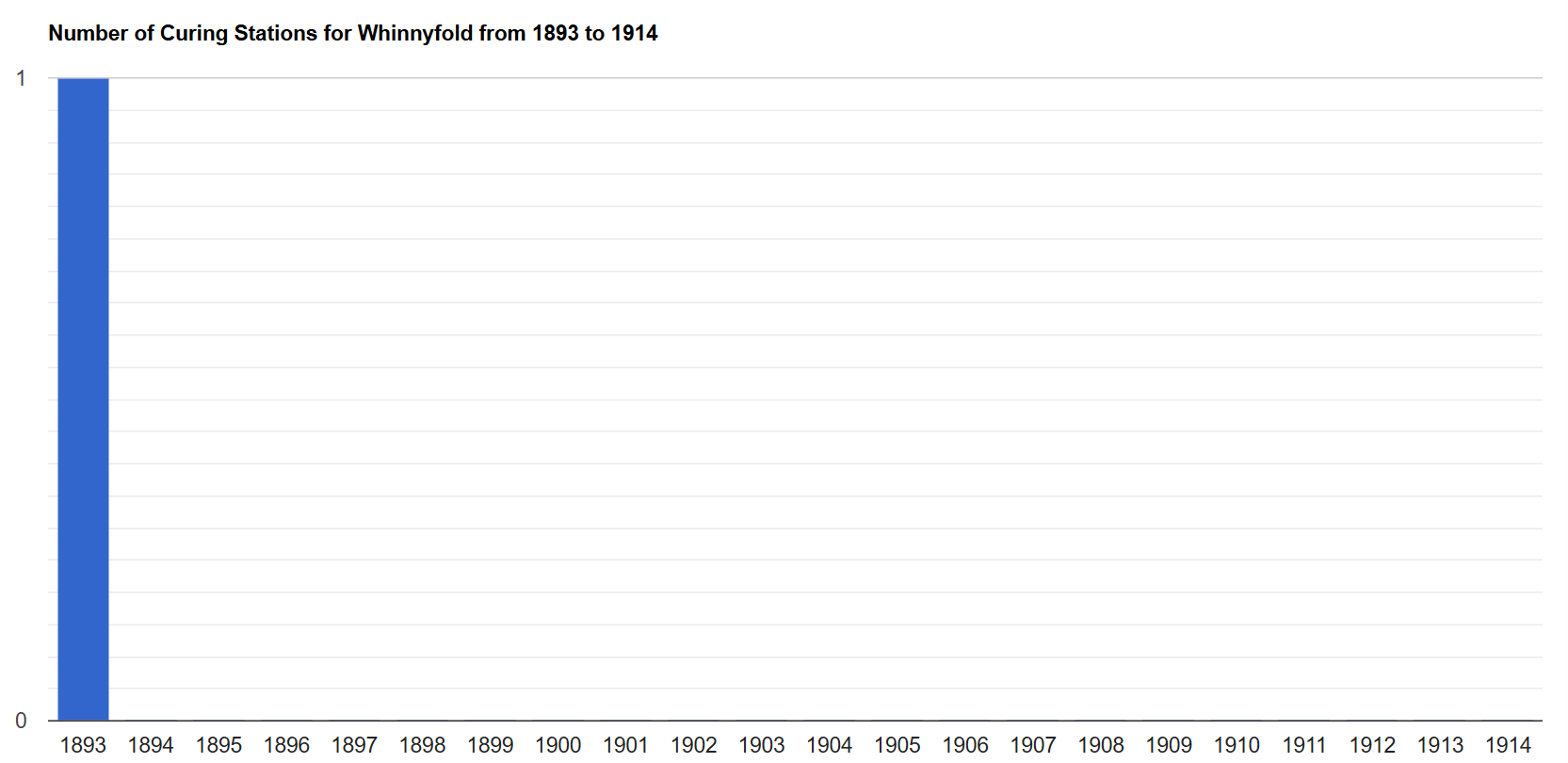
Number of curing stations

== Natural environment ==
The Colliston to Whinnyfold Coast is designated as a Site of Special Scientific Interest for nationally important colonies of cliff nesting seabirds, including kittiwake, guillemot, razorbill, fulmar and shag. It forms part of the Buchan Ness to Collieston Coast Special Protection Area.
