= Longhaven railway station =

Former railway station in Scotland

Coordinates: 57.4511°N 1.8096°W

Longhaven railway station was a railway station in Longhaven, Aberdeen, serving passengers and goods on the line to Boddam. It opened with the branch in 1897.

Former Services

Preceding station	Historical railways	Following station
Bullers O'Buchan	Great North of Scotland Railway; Boddam branch line	Boddam
