= Cruden Bay Hotel Tramway =

Tramway in Aberdeenshire, Scotland

Coordinates: 57.4162°N 1.8645°W

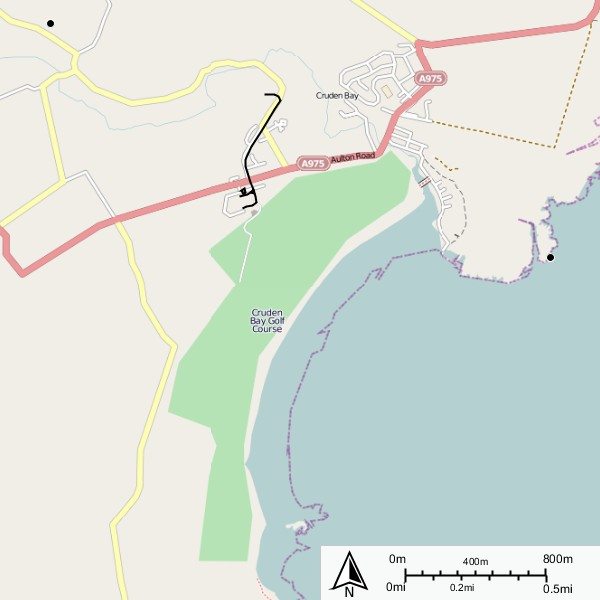
- Map of the route of the Cruden Bay Hotel Tramway. The railway station was at the north end of the route, and the hotel at the south.

Operation
- Locale: Cruden Bay
- Open: 1 June 1899
- Close: 31 December 1940
- Status: Closed

Infrastructure
- Track gauge: 3 ft 6 in (1,067 mm)
- Propulsion system: Electric
- Electrification: 500 volts
- Depot: Cruden Bay Hotel

Statistics
- Route length: 0.3 miles (0.48 km)

The Cruden Bay Hotel Tramway operated an electric tramway service between the Cruden Bay Hotel and Cruden Bay railway station between 1899 and 1940.

== History ==
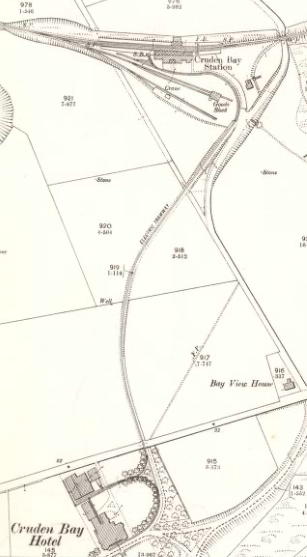
The Ordnance Survey 2nd Edition map of 1901 showing the Cruden Bay Tramway

The Cruden Bay Hotel tramway was built to connect Cruden Bay railway station with the Cruden Bay Hotel. It was constructed by the Great North of Scotland Railway which owned the hotel.

The railway company undertook to maintain the roadway for four feet either side of the rails where the tramway crossed the Newburgh to Port Errol road. The tramway was constructed mostly with bullhead rail set on chaired sleepers with open ballast, but using granite sett paving in the station forecourt. The line started at the station with a short loop laid to the west of the up platform building, and then followed the western edge of the approach road before entering a shallow cutting by the side of the Hatton to Port Errol Road. After crossing a field and the Newburgh to Port Errol Road it turned to terminate by the front door of the hotel. A triangular junction just over the road crossing led to the car shed and hotel laundry.

The tramcar shed at the hotel was built in 1899 at a cost of £500 (equivalent to £55,600 in 2025). However, in the summer months the tramcars were evicted as the shed was used as a dormitory for the male servants at the hotel.

It was the most northerly tramway service in the United Kingdom.

== Fleet ==
Two passenger tramcars were provided and built by the Great North of Scotland Railway at Kittybrewster, in a purple lake and cream livery with "Cruden Bay Hotel" on the rocker panel.

The line also had an open trailer car for the transport of coal, and two bogie cars for transporting boilers and other heavy items.

== Closure ==
Passenger services were terminated on 1 November 1932, when passenger rail services were suspended along the Boddam branch line to Cruden Bay railway station, and hotel guests were offered a motor car service direct to Aberdeen railway station. The tram continued for delivery of supplies and laundry to and from the railway which remained open to freight.

The hotel was requisitioned in 1940 as a Field Training Centre for the Gordon Highlanders. The tram ceased operation on 31 December 1940. The hotel never re-opened after the war and was sold for demolition in July 1947.

The tramcars were used as a summer house and shed until 1988 when they were recovered and the best of both was used to create a single car for preservation at the Grampian Transport Museum.

== Sources ==
Works cited

- Mitchell, M.J. (1985). "Cruden Bay Hotel Tramway". The Tramway Review. 16 (122).
