= Boddam railway station =

Disused railway station in Boddam, Aberdeenshire

Coordinates: 57.47017°N 1.78585°W

Boddam
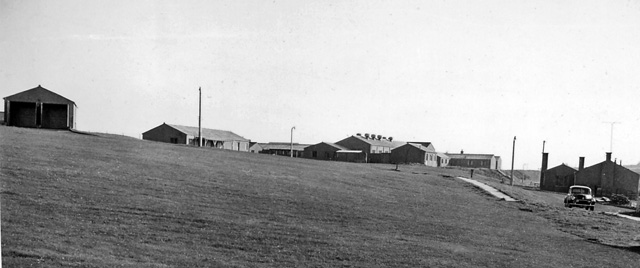
- The site of the station in 1961

General information
- Location: Boddam, Aberdeenshire; Scotland
- Platforms: 1

Other information
- Status: Disused

History
- Original company: Great North of Scotland Railway
- Pre-grouping: Great North of Scotland Railway
- Post-grouping: London and North Eastern Railway

Key dates
- 2 August 1897: Opened
- 31 October 1932: Closed to passengers
- 7 November 1945: Closed to goods
Location

Boddam railway station was a railway station in Boddam, Aberdeenshire that served as the terminus of a now closed line from Ellon.

== History ==
The station was opened on 2 August 1897 by the Great North of Scotland Railway. Services ran to Aberdeen and further afield. At the north side was the station building, on the east side was a locomotive and carriage shed and to the west of these was the signal box. The line closed to passenger trains on 31 October 1932 but goods traffic continued until 7 November 1945.

Preceding station	Disused railways	Following station
Longhaven	Great North of Scotland Railway; Boddam branch line	Terminus
