= Bullers O'Buchan Platform railway station =

Disused railway station in Peterhead, Aberdeenshire

Coordinates: 57.4317°N 1.8245°W

Bullers O'Buchan
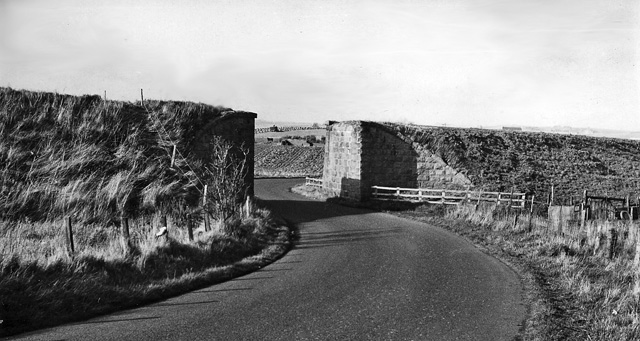
- The site of the Bullers O'Buchan Platform in 1961

General information
- Location: Peterhead; Scotland
- Grid reference: NK106379
- Platforms: 1

Other information
- Status: Disused

History
- Original company: Great North of Scotland Railway
- Post-grouping: London and North Eastern Railway

Key dates
- 1900: Opened
- 31 October 1932: Closed
- 7 November 1945: Line closed to freight
Location

Boddam Branch Line
Overview
- Dates of operation: 2 August 1897–1945

Technical
- Track gauge: 4 ft 8 1/2 in (1,435 mm)
- Length: 15 miles (24 km)

Bullers O'Buchan Platform railway station also known as Bullers O'Buchan Halt railway station was a railway station serving visitors to the Bullers of Buchan, a spectacular collapsed sea cave, and to the old fishing village. The station was located 6 miles (9.7 km) south of Peterhead in Buchan, Aberdeenshire, Scotland.

== History ==
The Ellon to Boddam branch or Crudens Railway was opened on 2 August 1897, serving a resort hotel and golf course at Cruden Bay but closed to passenger services on 31 October 1932 and to freight on 7 November 1945.

The station at Bullers O'Buchan however only opened in 1900, being closed on 31 October 1932 earlier than other stations that remained open for freight; the track throughout the branch was lifted in 1950 following the closure to freight services on 7 November 1945. The line in 1932 had been closed for the winter however the LNER never re-started the passenger service. Passenger closure dates of 1/11/32, 31/10/32 and 1/11/32 have also been suggested. In 1948 a large number of wagons were stored at Bullers O'Buchan.

== Infrastructure ==
The single platformed station was 12 miles (19 km) from Ellon and was linked to the nearby road by a short path and stood to the west of the old railway overbridge on the shore side of the line beyond the embankment. The station had no signalling and stood on a typical single track section of the line. An old railway cottage survives close to the remnants of the rail bridge abutment. Nothing now remains of the line at the site of the old station.

Former Services

Preceding station	Historical railways	Following station
Cruden Bay	Great North of Scotland Railway; Boddam branch line	Longhaven
