= Longhaven =

Hamlet in Scotland

Coordinates: 57.454522°N 1.808320°W

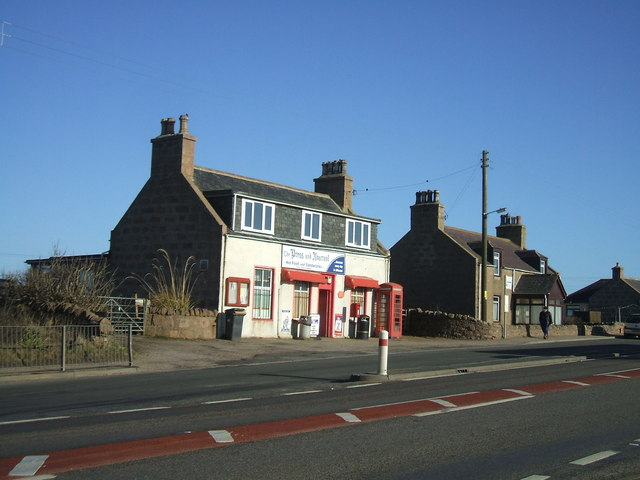
Shop at Longhaven in 2007

Longhaven is a village in Aberdeenshire, Scotland, located two miles southwest of Boddam.

Longhaven railway station closed in 1948. The village had a primary school which was closed in 2018 due to the inability to hire a head teacher. In 2022, it was announced that it would close permanently.
