= Auchmacoy railway station =

Disused railway station in Crawhead, Aberdeenshire

Auchmacoy

General information
- Location: Crawhead, Aberdeenshire; Scotland
- Coordinates: 57.3775°N 2.0084°W
- Platforms: 1

Other information
- Status: Disused

History
- Original company: Great North of Scotland Railway
- Pre-grouping: Great North of Scotland Railway
- Post-grouping: London and North Eastern Railway

Key dates
- 2 August 1897: Station opened
- 31 October 1932: Station closed
Location

Auchmacoy railway station was a railway station in Crawhead, Aberdeenshire, near the Burn of Auchmacoy from which the station took its name. It was located on the Boddam branch line between Ellon and Boddam. Opened on 2 August 1897, it closed on 31 October 1932.

== History ==
It was opened by the Great North of Scotland Railway on 2 August 1897. Under the Grouping of 1923, the line became part of the London and North Eastern Railway, which closed the station on 31 October 1932. The station building survives and has been recorded as Station House and Station Cottage.

Preceding station	Historical railways	Following station
Ellon	Great North of Scotland Railway; Boddam branch line	Pitlurg
