= Hatton, Aberdeenshire =

Village in United Kingdom

Coordinates: 57°25′32″N 1°54′56″W

Hatton: Hatton of Cruden
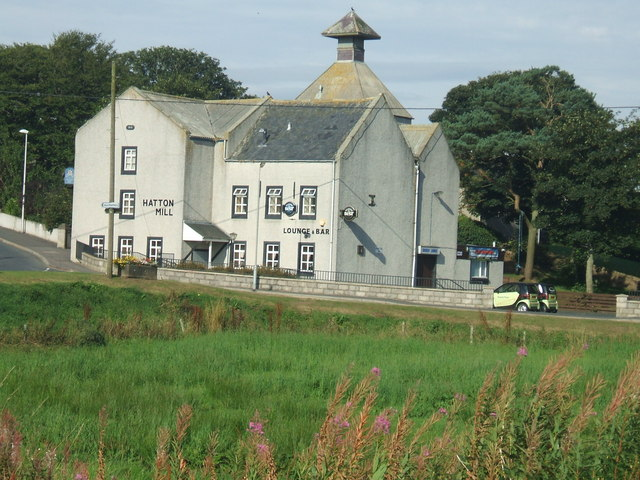
- Hatton Mill, once a water mill, now converted into a pub

- Location within Aberdeenshire
- Population: 870 (2020)
- Council area: Aberdeenshire
- Country: Scotland
- Sovereign state: United Kingdom
- Police: Scotland
- Fire: Scottish
- Ambulance: Scottish

Hatton (occasionally Hatton of Cruden) is a village in Aberdeenshire, Scotland that lies on the A90 road, approximately equidistant from both Ellon and Peterhead.

It has a biscuit factory that was once called Simmers – it was Hatton's only claim to fame, as it supplied biscuits to such upmarket shops as Marks and Spencers. However, it was purchased by McVities and then acquired by Murdoch Allan and Sons. It also has a shop, a village hall, a primary school and small park.

== History ==
There is considerable evidence of early human habitation in the vicinity, most notably by the existence of the ancient Catto Long Barrow and numerous tumuli nearby. The village of Hatton, Sri Lanka, founded as a tea plantation in the 19th century, was named for this village.

== Transport ==
Hatton railway station, on the Boddam Branch, served the village from 1897 to 1932.

Hatton Airfield (also known as Ardiffery Mains) (AG149) is a private airstrip located about 1 1/2 miles (2.5 kilometres) south of Hatton and just under two miles (three kilometres) from the coast. It has a single grass runway (headings 08/26). It is believed to only be used by the farmer on whose land it sits. The airport is in the Scottish Centre (EGPX0840) area control centre.
