= Hatton railway station (Aberdeenshire) =

Former railway station in Scotland

Coordinates: 57.4223°N 1.9119°W

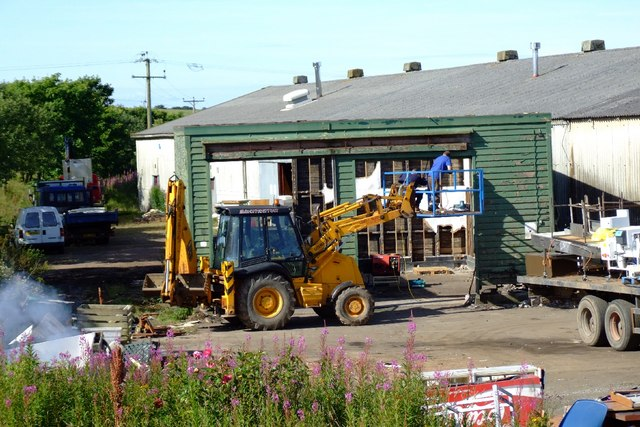
The goods shed being demolished in 2009

Hatton railway station was a railway station in Hatton, Aberdeenshire. It was situated to the south-east of the village and closed in 1932. Like the other stations on the branch, it was designed by Mr Smith, the GNSR architect in 1897.

Former Services

Preceding station	Historical railways	Following station
Pitlurg	Great North of Scotland Railway; Boddam branch line	Cruden Bay
