= Campaign for North East Rail =

- Region served: Aberdeenshire, Scotland
- Website: campaignfornortheastrail.org

Campaign for North East Rail (CNER) is an organisation campaigning for the reinstatement of railways in Aberdeenshire, Scotland.

The campaign was launched in March 2021 by engineers Wyndham Williams and Craig Leuchars, and train driver Jordan Jack. While Nestrans had previously decided reopening the lines was poor value for money, CNER disagrees with this and cites the Borders Railway outperforming passenger number predictions. In July 2022, the organisation put in an application for £250,000 from the Just Transition Fund for a feasibility study for the proposals. The application was successful.

== Proposals ==
The proposed line north of Aberdeen would roughly follow the former Formartine and Buchan Railway between Dyce and Fraserburgh. However, the branch to Peterhead would start at Ellon instead of Maud and follow the route of the former Boddam branch line. The organisation claims that this option has not been investigated before. The reopening of the Deeside Railway as far as Banchory is also proposed, with an integrated bus link to Braemar. and on top on that it wants to reintroduce the two railway stations in Cove Bay, and Newtonhill. In July 2022, the organisation estimated that a railway line to Peterhead would cost £450-500 million and a line to Fraserburgh would cost an additional £200-400 million.
