= Pitlurg railway station =

Disused railway station in Pitlurg, Aberdeenshire

Coordinates: 57.3994°N 1.9666°W

Pitlurg

General information
- Location: Pitlurg, Aberdeenshire; Scotland
- Platforms: 2

Other information
- Status: Disused

History
- Original company: Great North of Scotland Railway
- Pre-grouping: Great North of Scotland Railway
- Post-grouping: London and North Eastern Railway

Key dates
- 2 August 1897: Opened
- 31 October 1932: Closed
Location

Pitlurg railway station was a railway station in Pitlurg, Aberdeenshire.

== History ==
The station was opened on 2 August 1897 by the Great North of Scotland Railway. On the west side was the goods yard and on the southbound platform was the station building and the signal box. The station closed on 31 October 1932.

Preceding station	Disused railways	Following station
Auchmacoy	Great North of Scotland Railway; Boddam branch line	Hatton
