= Christian Watt =

Scottish fisherwoman and memoirist

- Born: 24 February 1833; Fraserburgh, Aberdeenshire, Scotland
- Died: 20 June 1923 (aged 90); Aberdeen Royal Asylum, Aberdeen, Scotland

Christian Watt (24 February 1833 – 20 June 1923) was a Scottish fisherwoman and memoirist.

== Early life ==
Christian Watt was born in 1833 in Broadsea, in the fishertown of Fraserburgh in Aberdeenshire. She was the seventh of eight children of her parents, fisherman James Watt (1787–1868) and Helen Noble (1788–1860), and their only daughter.

At the age of eight, Watt worked as a domestic servant, and in 1843 she became a maid to Lady Saltoun. In 1849 Watt began work as a domestic servant in London, arranged by the Duchess of Leeds. Five of her seven brothers died in the year 1854, and she travelled to the United States in 1856 to claim an inheritance from one of their estates; she worked as a table maid for a wealthy American family during her stay.

Watt married James Sim (1831–1877), a fisherman, on 2 December 1858 in Broadsea. They had ten children.

== Institutionalisation ==
In 1874, Watt's son Peter drowned at sea. Watt attributed her later asylum admittance to this event. Peter was followed by her son Joseph in 1876 (of tetanus) and husband James in 1877 (also drowned).

According to the case notes of the Aberdeen Royal Asylum at Cornhill, Watt was first admitted on 15 November 1877 with the diagnosis of "mania". According to both case notes and Watt's memoirs, Watt's mental health crises were characterised by religious delusions and a preoccupation with religious matters. On 29 December 1877 she was discharged as "recovered". However, on 29 January 1879 she was readmitted, again with a diagnosis of "mania". On 25 June 1879 she was discharged "recovered", but was readmitted a final time on 17 September 1879. During her time spent in the asylum, Watt became known as one of the "characters" of the institution. She remained there for the rest of her life, working, on day releases, in the laundry building at Cruden Bay Hotel. She died in 1923 at the age of ninety.

== Memoirs ==
She was well-educated, and wrote her memoirs. She was encouraged by two fellow patients, a doctor and a solicitor, at the Royal Aberdeen Asylum. These memoirs tell the story of her own life and the history of her family, which included members of the local minor nobility. They give an insight into the lives of fishing families in the latter half of the 19th century. Her account was written in pencil, in a clear hand. According to her memoirs, patients were not allowed quill pens, for fear they would use them as a weapon or drink the ink.

Her writings were published posthumously as The Christian Watt Papers, edited by her descendant David Fraser, in 1983. An alternative edition was released in 1994, from the original manuscript owned by her granddaughter, Christian Sims. Some scholars have expressed doubt over the authenticity of the published Watt papers, positing that they might have been written by one of her descendants. However, the style resembles that of other memoirs by less-educated writers, and the use of pencil accords with asylum patrons beint forbidden the use of pens. Moreover, if Watt did not write the memoir herself, it is agreed that what was written was informed by her reminiscences.

== Adaptations ==
Her memoirs have since been the subject of a radio drama, Light in a Dark Place (1984), a stage play, Precarious Living (1985), and a drama documentary series, Caorstaidh (Kirsty) (1994). There is a Christian Watt Drive in Fraserburgh.
