= Stirling Village =

Village in Scotland

Coordinates: 57°28′14.5″N 1°47′20.1″W

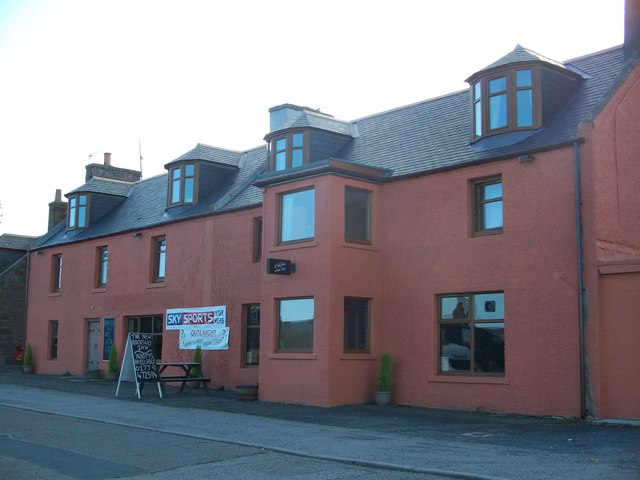
The Rocksley Inn at Stirling Village

Stirling Village is a settlement in the Buchan area of Aberdeenshire, Scotland, located on the A90 road immediately to the west of Boddam and 3 miles (4.8 km) south of Peterhead.

The settlement was known for many years known simply as Stirling, until in 2004 it was renamed Stirling Village to avoid confusion with the newly granted city of Stirling.

The dome of the Remote Radar Head Buchan, an air defence radar station operated by the Royal Air Force, is located on Stirling Hill to the south of the village.
