= Broadsea =

Coordinates: 57.6952°N 2.0203°W

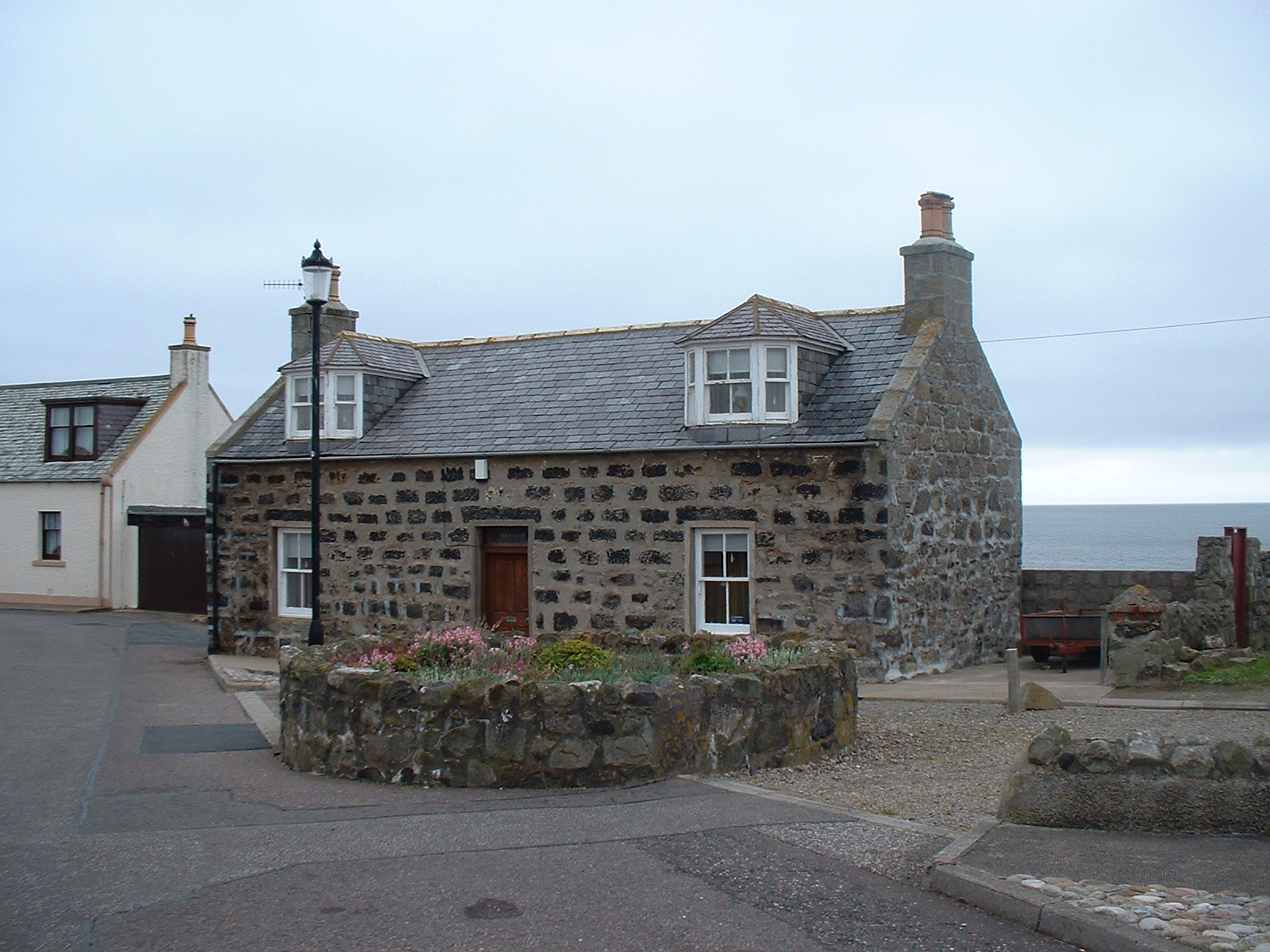
A cottage in Broadsea

Broadsea is a community situated in Aberdeenshire in the north east of Scotland. It is a long-standing fishing community at the north edge of Fraserburgh.

Christian Watt, author of The Christian Watt Papers, was born and raised in Broadsea. Her memoirs give an insight into the lives in the community during the latter part of the 19th century.

== History ==
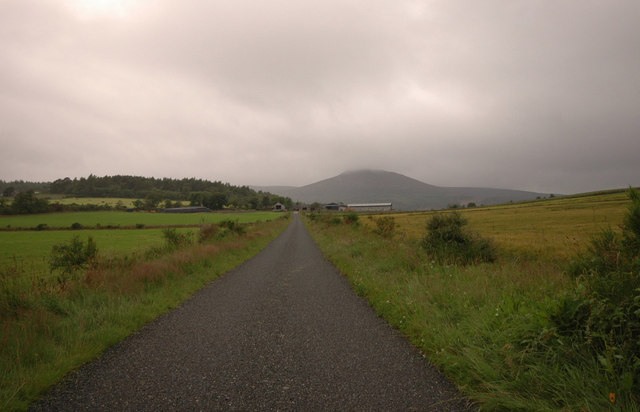
Broadsea Farm

Much of the history of the small village of Broadsea in written widely about in Christian Watts' memoirs. Perhaps the most famous group the Broadsea village were the Noble families. They were of great influence in the village in the 17th century. As such, to buy favour with the family, Alexander Fraser, 11th Lord Saltoun, created a title for the head of the Nobles – the 'Constable of Broadsea'. The constableship passed from the Nobles to the Lascelles family in a series of marriages until the 1740s, when the title was revoked by the Hanoverian state. William Lascelles, the last constable, had been against both the Act of Union and Hanoverian succession. The title continued for at least two more generations as a hereditary pretendership. It has been claimed that later Noble families descend from both the 11th and 12th Lord Saltouns of Abernethy.

=== Constables of Broadsea ===
- 3rd constable – Alexander Noble, Traveller of Zetland
- 4th constable – Grissel Noble, daughter of Alexander
- 5th constable – David Lascelles, son of Grissel and Walter Lascelles
- 6th constable – Anne Lascelles, sister of David
- 7th constable – Margaret Ann Noble, daughter of Anne and Patrick Noble
- 8th constable – William Lascelles (c.1737–1785), son of Margaret and James Lascelles
- 9th constable – Helen Lascelles (c.1758–1841), Pretender
- 10th constable – Helen Noble, Pretender, and the mother of Christian Watt.

== Architecture ==
The community's 17th-century school was demolished before 1990.
