= Cruden Bay Hotel =

Hotel in Cruden Bay, Scotland

- The hotel in the early years of the 20th century, looking northwest. A tram stands at the entrance

- Location within Aberdeenshire Location within Scotland

General information
- Type: Hotel
- Location: Cruden Bay, Scotland
- Coordinates: 57°24′50″N 1°51′53″W
- Construction started: 1897 (129 years ago)
- Completed: March 1899 (127 years ago)
- Closed: 1932 (94 years ago)
- Demolished: c. 1952 (74 years ago)

Technical details
- Material: Pink Peterhead granite

Other information
- Number of rooms: 55

Cruden Bay Hotel was a hotel in Cruden Bay, Aberdeenshire, Scotland. Following the success of the Palace Hotel in Aberdeen, it was built between 1897 and 1899 by the same owners. It closed in 1932 and was demolished between 1947 and 1952.

The hotel had 55 rooms, tennis courts, croquet lawns and lawn-bowling greens. It was part of a grand scheme to transform Cruden Bay into an upmarket luxury resort, one that was described as the Brighton of Aberdeenshire.

The Cruden Bay Hotel Tramway operated an electric tramway service between the hotel and Cruden Bay railway station between 1899 and 1940.

Notable patrons of the hotel include British prime ministers H. H. Asquith and David Lloyd George, who met there for afternoon tea, while Winston Churchill played on the golf course. Christian Watt worked in the hotel laundry building, which survived until the late 20th century.

After the hotel's closure, the building was used as barracks during the Second World War.

The former location of the hotel is now occupied by Links View and Links Place, streets immediately to the north of Cruden Bay Golf Club.

The hotel's former location on the Cruden Bay landscape, looking northeast
