= Boddam branch line =

Railway line in Scotland

Boddam Branch Line
Overview
- Key people: Patrick Moir Barnett engineer
- Locale: Scotland
- Dates of operation: 2 August 1897–1945

Technical
- Track gauge: 4 ft 8 1/2 in (1,435 mm)
- Length: 15 miles (24 km)

The Boddam Branch Line was a 15-mile branch railway line constructed by the Great North of Scotland Railway (GNoSR) from Ellon railway station to Boddam in Aberdeenshire. It opened in 1897. As well as serving the small fishing port of Boddam and nearby stone quarries, it connected to the Cruden Bay Hotel, a luxurious resort hotel established and operated by the GNoSR. As a United Kingdom railway-owned resort hotel, the hotel was an unusual development.

The remote location of the hotel and the short season, led to poor financial performance of the hotel; the other hoped-for traffics of the branch line were also disappointing. The passenger service on the branch line was discontinued in 1932 and the hotel itself was requisitioned by the military at the outset of World War II; it never re-opened to the public. The goods service on the branch closed at the end of 1948.

== Origins ==
=== A branch line and a hotel ===
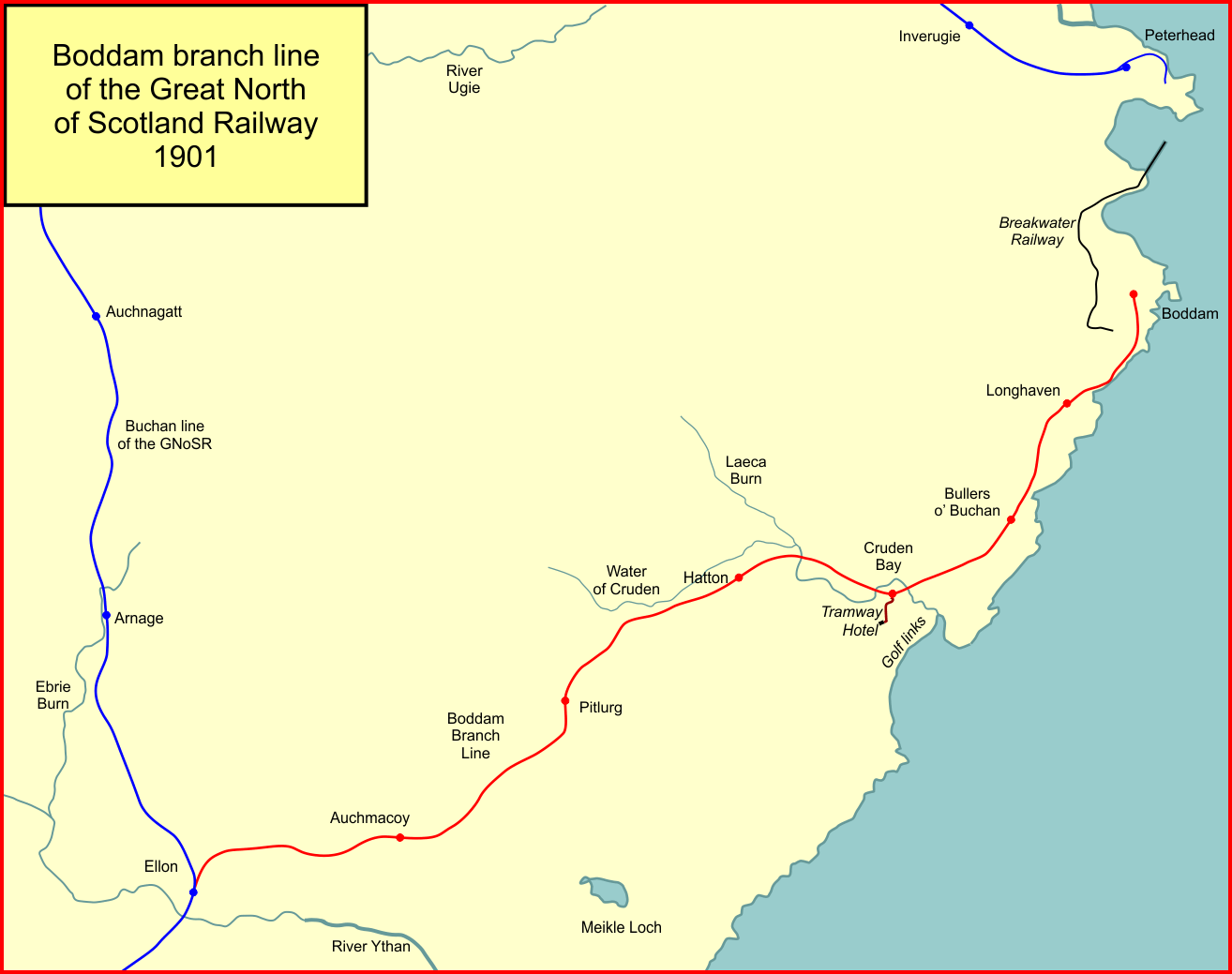
System map of the Boddam branch railway, Aberdeenshire

The GNoSR had a main line from Aberdeen to Keith, and had encouraged local privately owned companies to build connecting branch lines. On that basis the Formartine and Buchan Railway Company built branch lines from Dyce to Peterhead and Fraserburgh, in Aberdeenshire, Scotland. Those lines opened in stages from 1861 to 1865. The financial performance of the Formartine and Buchan Railway was poor, and with several others, the company was absorbed by the GNoSR in 1866. The Fraserburgh and Peterhead lines became known as The Buchan Lines.

In 1891 the GNoSR purchased the Palace Hotel in Aberdeen, close to the station premises there. It had been built in 1874, and the GNoSR set about modernising it, installing electric lighting and hydraulic lifts; it reopened in August 1891. The arrangement was considered a success, and in October 1892 the board decided to establish a new hotel. This was to be on Cruden Bay, at Port Errol; it was to be a resort hotel, that is, a destination in itself. The concept of a resort hotel, in many cases a "hydropathic" establishment, had become fashionable. The Canadian Pacific Railway had opened one in Banff in 1888, but the GNoSR was leading the field in doing so in the United Kingdom. There was to be a golf course, spa, sea bathing and other attractions.

The Great North of Scotland Railway (Various Powers) Act 1893 (56 & 57 Vict. c. cci) was obtained for the purpose. The location at Cruden Bay was considered to be perfect, but the nearest railway station was at Ellon, on the Formartine and Buchan line, about 10 miles distant. Accordingly, there would need to be a new railway branch line from Ellon to Cruden Bay. It was planned to continue the line for five miles beyond Cruden Bay to reach the small fishing town of Boddam. Charles Brand was the contractor for the railway construction, and his firm began work on 8 September 1893. With granite quarries to be served, the Boddam fishery, and the Cruden Bay brickworks, as well as the proposed hotel, the 15-mile line was regarded as a safe project. The engineering works were light, at the expense of heavy gradients. (Note: Barclay-Harvey says that "it was expensive to construct, as it included a number of bridges and other heavy engineering works". Barclay-Harvey was interested in locomotive operation, and steep gradients made locomotive work heavy, while minimising civil engineering work during construction. Vallance, originally writing before the war, says that "The engineering works were light, but the gradients were far from easy." Again in 1956 Vallance writes that "The engineering works were light but the ruling gradient was as steep as 1 in 62.)

=== Hotel and tramway ===
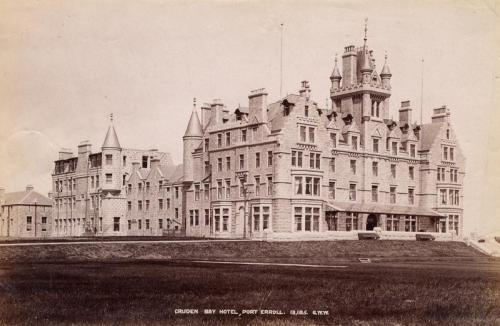
Cruden Bay Hotel

Clearly the dominant reason for making the branch line was access to the hotel. The hotel was provisionally named the Port Erroll Hotel, although this was later changed to the Cruden Bay Hotel. It was to have 55 bedrooms, and be constructed of pink Peterhead granite; the estimated cost was £16,000, with additional costs of £5,000 for lifts, heating, furnishings and grounds. It was hoped that the district council would provide water and sewerage connections, but in the end the railway company provided this itself at a cost of £1,200. Lighting was to be by paraffin lamps, but "if a laundry is erected, electric lighting can be provided at a probable outlay of £1,000 for a dynamo and wiring". The laundry and the electrical supply were in fact installed.

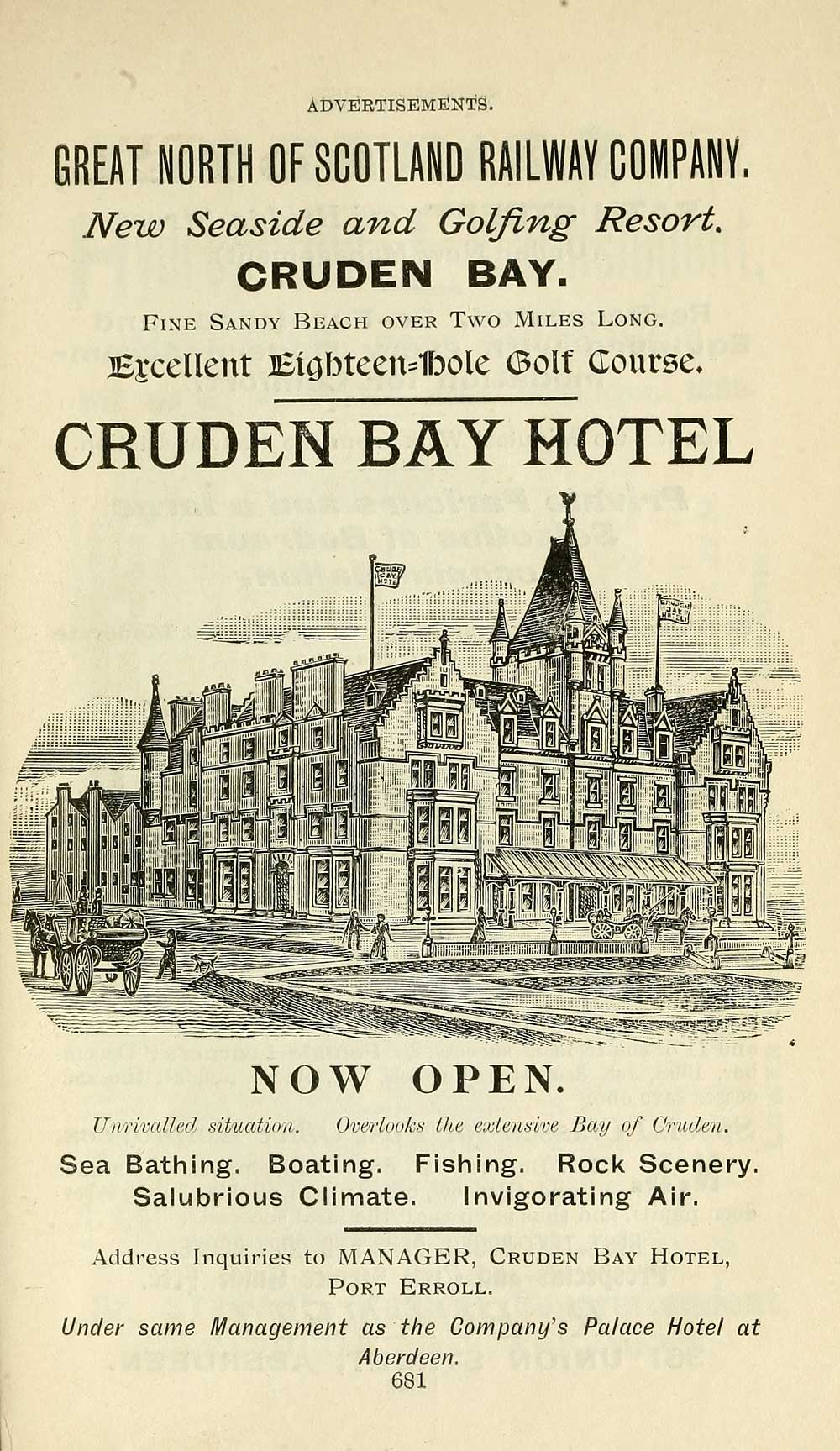
Advertisement for the Cruden Bay Hotel

In August 1898 the GNoSR sent a party of directors and engineers to the Isle of Man to inspect the electric and light railways there, with a view to making a tramway connection between the hotel and the railway station. On 14 September 1898 the company decided to construct an electric tramway, together with a laundry and an additional lift in the hotel, and a dynamo for electric power. The tramway needed to cross the main Newburgh – Port Erroll road, and the county council agreed to a level crossing. The estimated cost of this enhancement was £9,005.

Two single-deck four-wheel tramcars were built at the GNoSR Kittybrewster workshops in 1899; in addition there was an open trailer for carrying coal, and two bogie cars for carrying boilers and other heavy articles.

== History ==
=== Opening and financial results ===
The line opened for traffic on 2 August 1897. The Cruden Bay station was built to a high standard, in keeping with the hotel: the Glasgow Herald (newspaper, now retitled The Herald described the station as extremely handsome, with ornamental gables and panel work, separate first class waiting rooms for ladies and gentlemen, a refreshment buffet, and a carriage verandah outside. The hotel was still under construction at the time of opening of the railway.

In fact the opening of the hotel was deferred until 1899, though the golf course had been laid out and was in use. In late December 1898 a special train of "luxurious bogie saloons" [modern railway coaches] had taken directors and guests to view the almost-finished hotel. The company promoted the hotel vigorously, with advertisements for the "New Seaside and Golfing Resort". Miss Kate Campbell was appointed manager, at £100 a year, though Miss McKilliam was in overall charge, and a golf professional, Alex N Weir formerly of Arbroath, was appointed, at £70 a year. The opening day was 1 March 1899.

The 3 ft 6 1/2in gauge tramway opened in June. It operated on 500-volt DC current from the hotel's 33 kW generator, A laundry was built on the site; it also served the needs of the Palace Hotel, Aberdeen, as well as those of the GNoSR generally. The tariff for August and September was 15s per day on the first floor, 14s on the second floor, 12s on the third floor and 10s 6d on the fourth, inclusive of breakfast, lunch, afternoon tea and dinner; provision of a [coal] fire in the room cost extra. After five months of operation the results were described as "most encouraging" and the hotel committee decided to keep it open though the winter, at a reduced rate of £2 10s per week.

The hotel results may have been "most encouraging" but Barclay-Harvey, talking about the branch line as a whole, says that:

Despite the fact that the hotel was very comfortable and the golf course one of the best in Scotland, the whole undertaking was a disastrous one. The season was too short to make them profitable, and the railway, which passed through comparatively poor country, never paid, and the time came when all concerned wished it had never been made."

In fact the hotel was beset with a heavy turnover of management, indicating intrinsic problems; Miss Campbell had resigned in 1900 and her successor, Miss Frater, was dismissed in 1901 for failing to keep provision costs down. A new manager, Mr Trenchard of the Claremont Hydropathic Hotel, Rhyl, was appointed in February 1902 at £130. The hotels had a bad year in 1905, with the Aberdeen Palace's net profit falling and Cruden Bay making a loss for the second year in succession: with revenue of £7,480 against costs, including interest payments, of £8,184. Mr Trenchard had gone, and Miss Williams, manager of Bruce's Hotel, Carnoustie, was appointed at £100 a year plus 2 1/2% of net annual profits as an incentive to keep costs down. The company had tried to sell a lease of the Cruden Bay Hotel, but none of the large chains were attracted.<ross168>

=== Train services ===
Trains on the Boddam line stopped at all stations, and the number of services never exceeded five in each direction. After the opening of the Cruden Bay Hotel, improved connections were given by the acceleration of trains on the Buchan section. Through services to and from Aberdeen were inaugurated in the summer of 1899, with a morning train in each direction, running non-stop between Ellon and Aberdeen. The down train was withdrawn in the autumn of 1899 and never reinstated, but the up service survived as a summer-only feature. Although efforts were made to popularise the hotel and the golf course, and to develop Port Errol, the results were most disappointing. Moreover, the fish traffic from Boddam failed to come up to expectations.

In April 1899 the GNoSR was criticised when it issued cheap fares for Sunday travel, so enabling golfers to desecrate the Sabbath by playing on the new course at Cruden Bay. But the newspaper reporter felt that people would be "just as well employed in playing golf on Sundays as loafing about church doors and annoying worshippers as they are complained of doing in Aberdeen".

=== Closures ===
On 1 November 1932, the passenger service was withdrawn on the "unsuccessful" branch to Boddam. The hotel tramway ceased passenger operation at the same time; hotel visitors were offered a motor car service from Aberdeen station. The tramway continued to carry stores and laundry to and from the hotel's laundering facilities.

During World War II, the hotel was closed to the public, and requisitioned in 1940 as a field training centre for the Gordon Highlanders, in some cases arriving and departing by troop train on the line. The tramway ceased operation on 31 December 1940.

The Cruden Bay Hotel was handed back to the railway company by the autumn of 1945. The premises were then advertised for sale, but no definite offers were received. Eventually, it was decided that the heavy cost of maintaining the hotel was not justified, and in July 1947 it was sold to a demolition contractor. The work of clearing the site was not completed until 1952.

Freight service was withdrawn in November 1945 and the line was subsequently used for wagon storage. In November 1946 there was said to be 4189 wagons in storage on the line awaiting repair. The branch line was completely closed on 31 December 1948. (Note: Vallance says, page 169, "The railway from Ellon to Boddam … was closed completely on 7 November 1945" but this seems to be a mistake.)

== Legacy ==
=== The line today ===
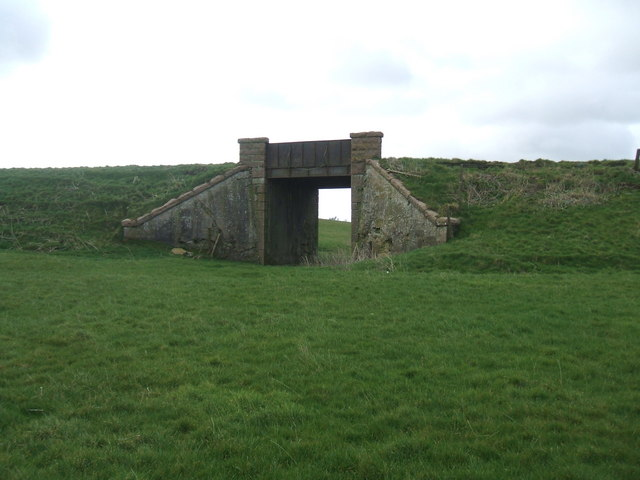
Bridge over the trackbed near Pitlurg station.

Unlike the Formartine and Buchan Railway, the route of the line was not preserved as it closed far earlier. That said, few parts of the line are built on and many farms have not gone to the trouble of levelling the ground on the route. Most of the route is still visible, with several embankments, cuttings and road overbridges still in situ along the route (however many have been backfilled to allow farm access).

Most of the bridges which carried the railway have been taken down, including the substantial Cruden Bay viaduct, although three pillars of it remain standing. One large bridge remains, spanning the Water of Cruden at Bridgend. Numerous culverts are remaining, possibly five or more are over small burns between Pitlurg and Hatton, one is over the Water of Cruden at Nethermill, one is over the smaller burn at Cruden Bay, and another, which can be walked through, is at Bullers o' Buchan. A number of well built bridge buttresses are still standing for the railway and for overbridges. The photo has one of many similar looking overbridges.

The remaining evidence of station sites is slim, some having been built on. The station hotel at Hatton remains while a goods shed there was demolished in 2012. All stationmasters' houses exist today.

Walking the full length of the line is impossible, as some sections have been removed entirely (particularly where the line crossed the A90 and A975), several extant sections are fenced prohibiting access and other sections are thick with bushes. Sections that can be done include Hatton to Bogbrae and a section around the Burn of Forvie.

=== Tramcars at museum ===
Grampian Transport Museum reconstructed one of the tramcars and placed it on exhibition there.

== New line proposal ==
The Campaign for North East Rail has proposed the reopening of part of the route for a new line to Peterhead, which would follow the alignment of the Boddam branch as far as Cruden Bay. However Transport Scotland has decided not to include this proposal in its plans.

== Locations ==
- Boddam; opened 2 August 1897; closed 31 October 1932;
- Longhaven; opened 2 August 1897; closed 31 October 1932;
- Bullers o' Buchan; opened 1899; closed 31 October 1932;
- Cruden Bay; opened 2 August 1897; closed 31 October 1932;
- Hatton; opened 2 August 1897; closed 31 October 1932;
- Pitlurg; opened 2 August 1897; closed 31 October 1932;
- Auchmacoy; opened 2 August 1897; closed 31 October 1932;
- Ellon; main line station; opened 18 July 1861; closed 4 October 1965.
