= Cruden Bay railway station =

Disused railway station in Cruden Bay, Aberdeenshire

Coordinates: 57.4195°N 1.8633°W

Cruden Bay
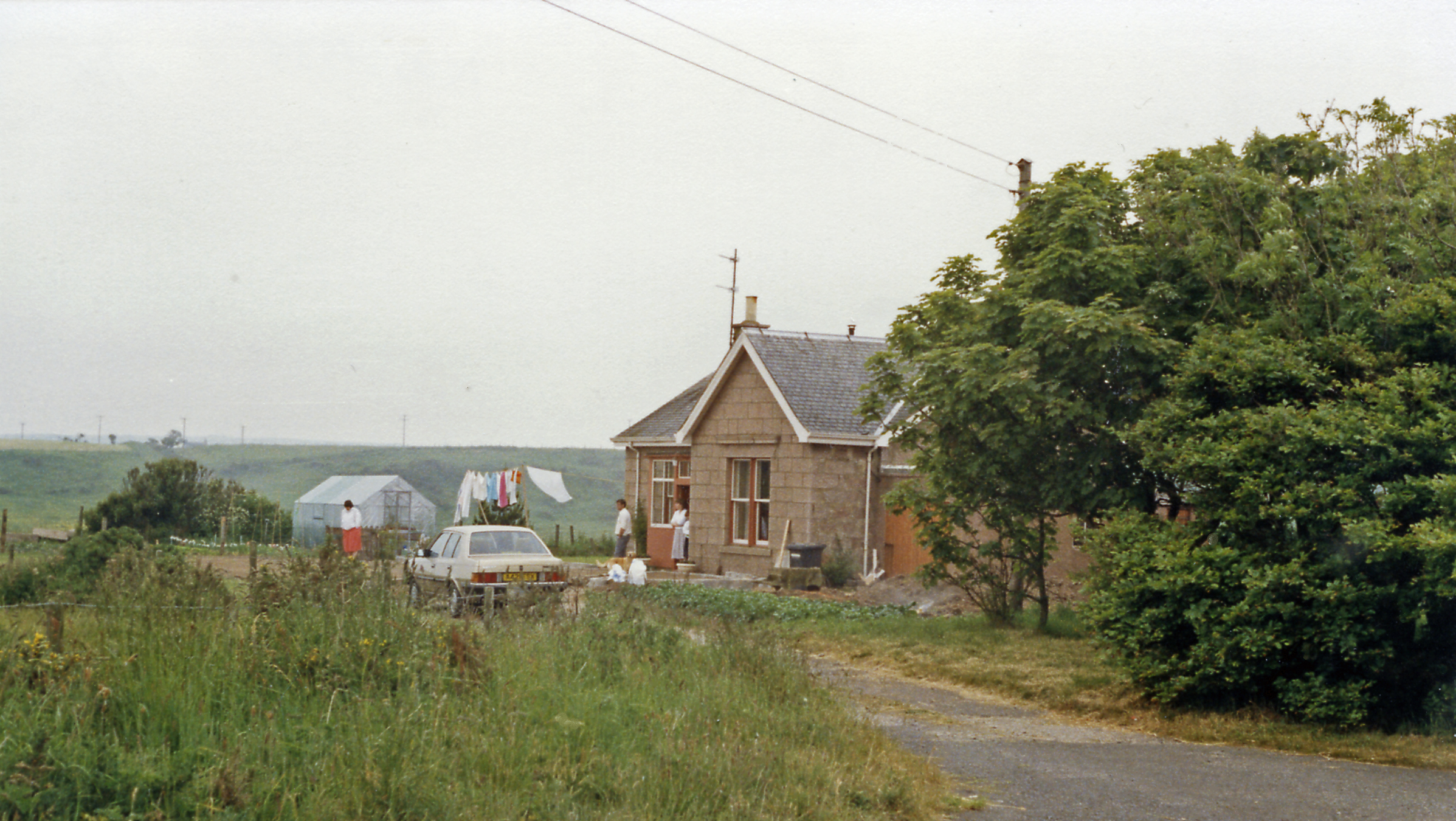
- The former stationmaster's house in 1988

General information
- Location: Scotland
- Platforms: 2

Other information
- Status: Disused

History
- Original company: Great North of Scotland Railway
- Post-grouping: London and North Eastern Railway

Key dates
- 2 August 1897: Opened
- 31 October 1932: Closed
Location

Cruden Bay railway station was a railway station serving Cruden Bay, Aberdeenshire, Scotland.

== History ==
The station opened on 2 August 1897.

The station was destroyed by fire on 23 April 1931 and it closed in 1932.

From 1899 to 1932, a passenger tramway service from the station to the Cruden Bay Hotel was provided by the Cruden Bay Hotel Tramway. After the station closed to passenger traffic the tramway continued with freight services until 1945.

Preceding station	Disused railways	Following station
Hatton	Great North of Scotland Railway; Boddam branch line	Bullers O'Buchan
