= Ellon railway station =

Disused railway station in Ellon, Aberdeenshire

Ellon
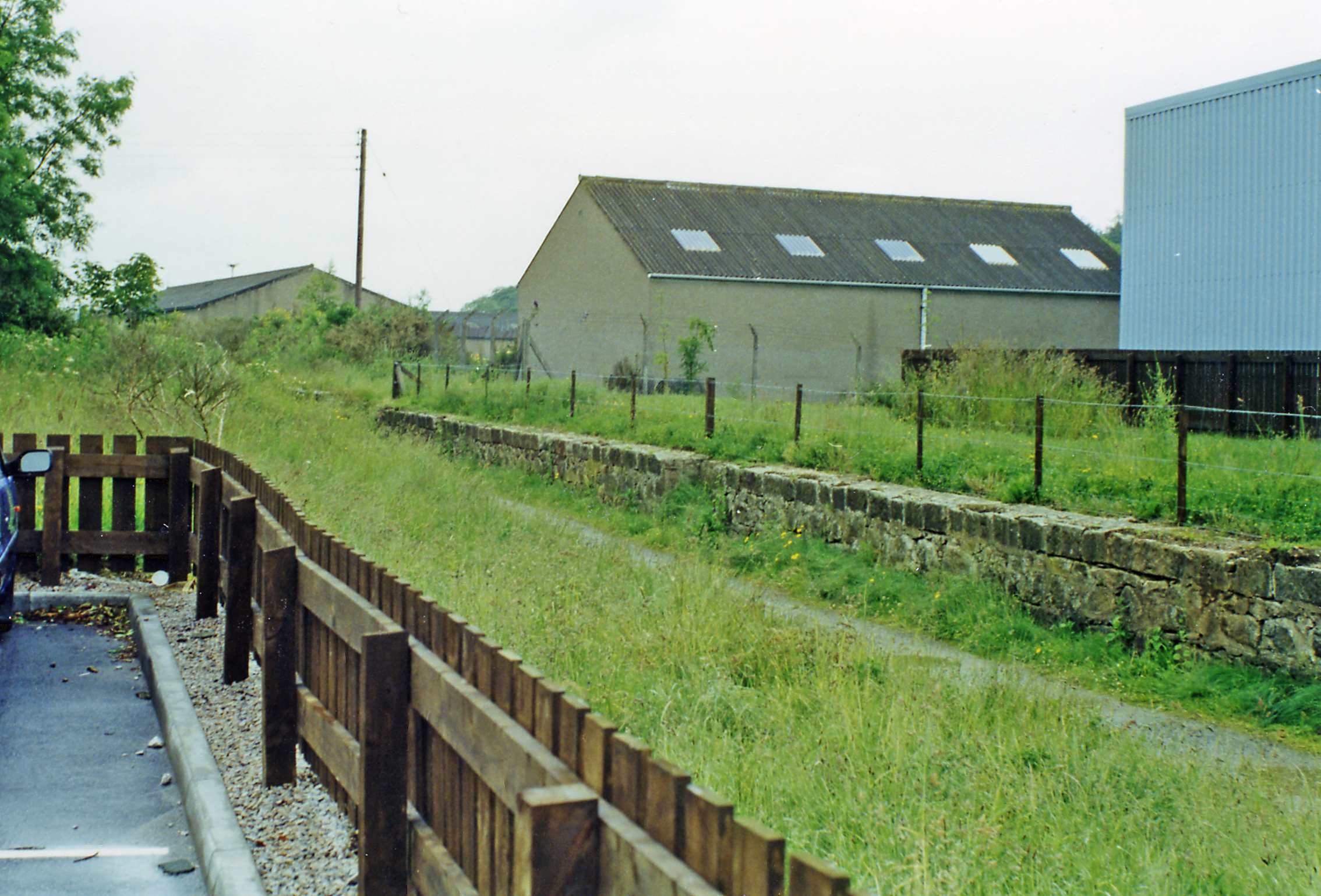
- Site of the station in 1997

General information
- Location: Ellon, Aberdeenshire; Scotland
- Coordinates: 57.368°N 2.085°W
- Grid reference: NJ950308
- Platforms: 3

Other information
- Status: Disused

History
- Original company: Formartine and Buchan Railway
- Pre-grouping: Great North of Scotland Railway
- Post-grouping: LNER

Key dates
- 18 July 1861: Opened as Ellon for Cruden
- 2 August 1897: Renamed
- 4 October 1965: Closed
Location

Ellon railway station was a railway station serving Ellon, Aberdeenshire, Scotland, on the Formartine and Buchan Railway. It opened in 1861 and closed in 1965.

== History ==
Ellon railway station (originally Ellon for Cruden) was situated on the Formartine and Buchan Railway, which ran from Peterhead and Fraserburgh to Dyce, where it connected with the Great North of Scotland Railway to Aberdeen.

A few years after opening, the station became a junction for the Boddam branch line, which ran to Boddam via Cruden Bay. In its heyday it had three platforms, two for the main line and one for the Boddam branch, as well as a substantial goods yard. The branch line closed in 1932 and was subsequently used to store wagons until the track was lifted in 1950.

The station was situated in the Auchterellon area, about 1 mile from Ellon town centre.

Ellon survived until 1965, when passenger services were withdrawn from the Formartine and Buchan Railway due to the Beeching Axe. The line was closed to freight in 1979, with the tracks being lifted soon afterwards.

== The station today ==
The trackbed of the main line was initially preserved before becoming the Formartine and Buchan Way, a long-distance cycle path. At the station site itself, no buildings survive; the platforms and base of the water tower remain extant. A council depot was built on the former goods yard. The bridge over Station Road has been removed to the south, with the abutments converted to allow graded access across the road.

As the Boddam Branch closed in 1932, with the track being lifted much earlier, most of the branch line within Ellon has been built on, by housing along Hospital Road, and the A948 Ellon Northern Bypass in 2001. However some of the trackbed is still visible from Golf Road, next to the McDonald Parklands housing estate.

Preceding station	Disused railways	Following station
Esslemont; Line and station closed	Great North of Scotland Railway; Formartine and Buchan Railway	Arnage; Line and station closed
Terminus	Great North of Scotland Railway; Boddam branch line	Auchmacoy; Line and station closed
