= Boddam, Aberdeenshire =

Village in Aberdeenshire, Scotland

Boddam
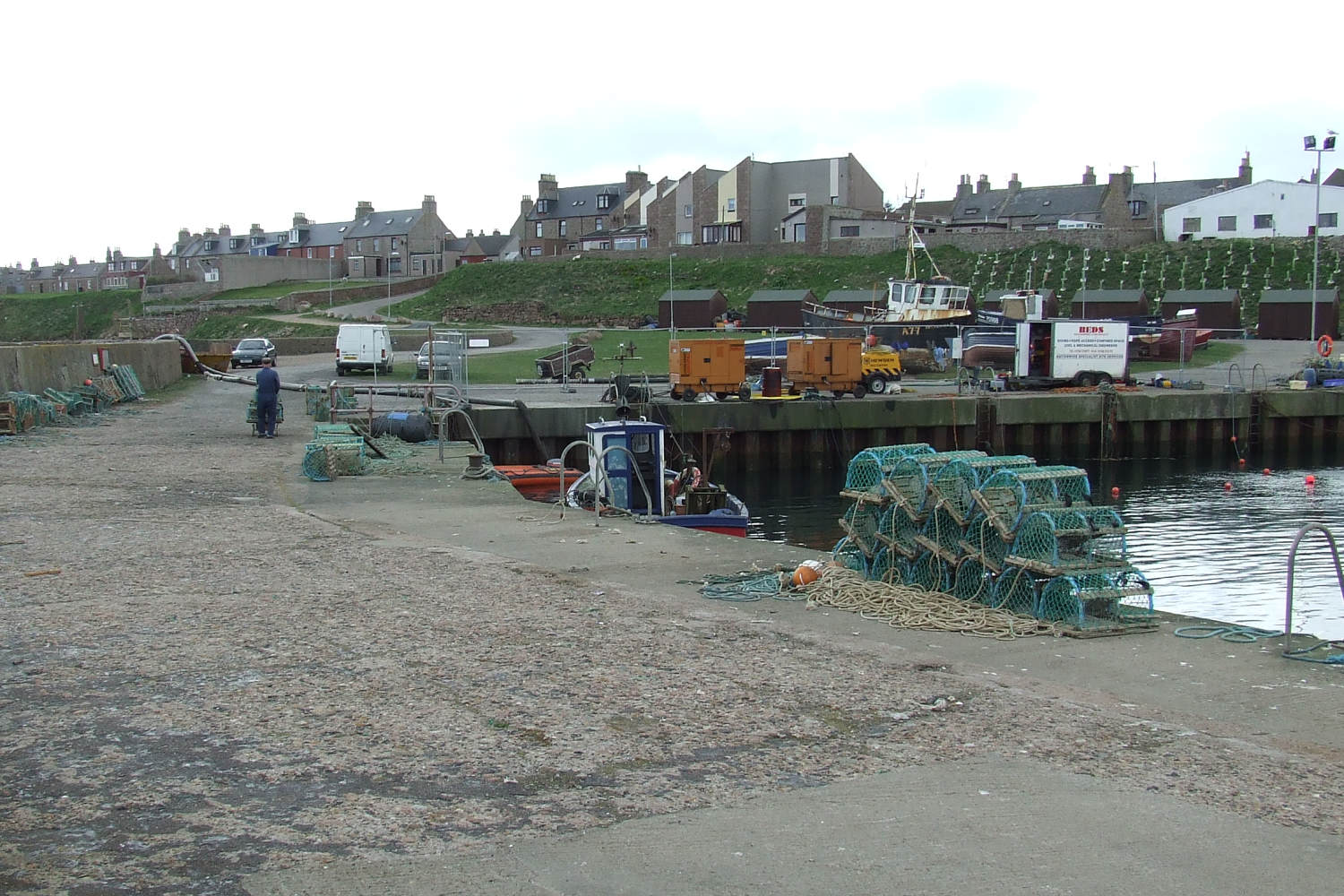
- Boddam Harbour

- Location within Aberdeenshire
- Population: 1,220 (2020)
- OS grid reference: NK134422
- Council area: Aberdeenshire
- Lieutenancy area: Aberdeenshire
- Country: Scotland
- Sovereign state: United Kingdom
- Post town: PETERHEAD
- Postcode district: AB42
- Dialling code: 01779
- Police: Scotland
- Fire: Scottish
- Ambulance: Scottish
- UK Parliament: Aberdeenshire North and Moray East
- Scottish Parliament: Banffshire and Buchan Coast

Boddam is a coastal village in Aberdeenshire, Scotland. It is 29 miles (47 km) north of Aberdeen and 3 miles (4.8 km) south of Peterhead. The settlement of Stirling Village lies immediately to the west. Sea cliffs rise to 200 feet (61 m), south of the village: a coastal path leads along these to the Bullers of Buchan.

== History ==
There is vicinity evidence of prehistoric man, particularly slightly to the southwest of Boddam where a number of prehistoric monuments including Catto Long Barrow, Silver Cairn and many tumuli are found. In that same vicinity of the Laeca Burn watershed is the point d'appui of historic battles between invading Danes and indigenous Picts.

While human occupation in the vicinity of Boddam is attested to from Neolithic times with the quarrying of flint deposits at the Den of Boddam and in more recent times by the fortified remains near the islet of Dundonnie just south of the modern-day village, for much of the early historical period there is little or no record of habitation in the location of the fishing settlement which grew up later.

Boddam Castle was built in the late 16th century by the Ludquharn branch of the Keith family, whose other strongholds in the area are at Inverugie Castle and Ravenscraig Castle, west of Peterhead. Sir William Keith, Lieutenant Governor of Pennsylvania and Delaware, was born here in 1669.

During the First World War about a hundred German prisoners were sent from Stobs Camp to work in the granite quarries nearby.

=== Fishing ===
Like Peterhead, Boddam grew as a fishing town during the 18th century but until 1831, when the first of two harbours was constructed (one by William Aiton and his company) to the north of the lighthouse, boats had to be hauled onto shore by hand.

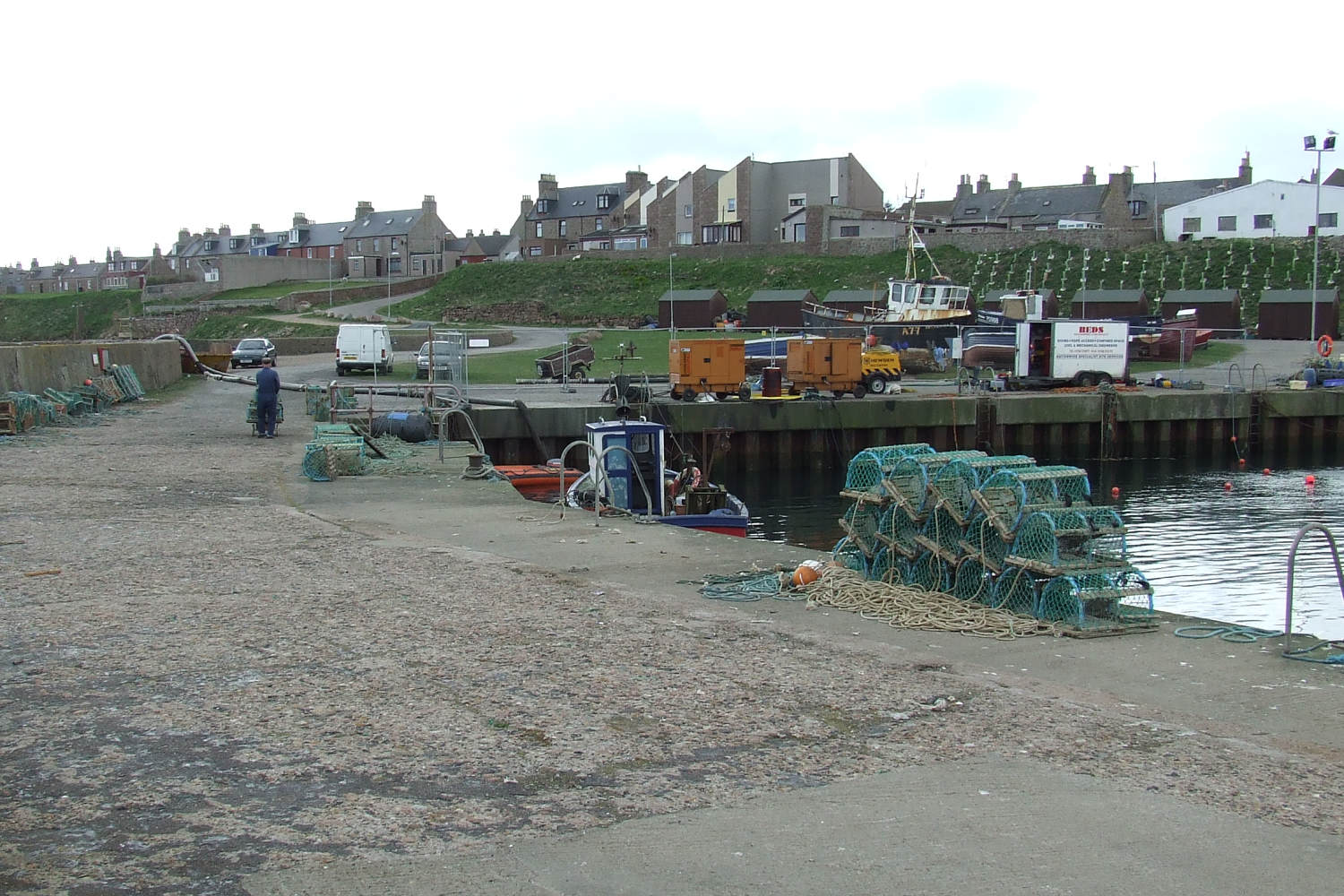
Boddam Harbour with lobster pots

A marine villa, known as the Earl's Lodge, was built in 1840 for George Hamilton-Gordon, Earl of Aberdeen (later Prime Minister) and in 1842 he initiated construction of the second harbour situated next to the first, leading to a considerable increase in the local fishing industry and Registered Port status in 1845. By the mid-1840s the population of the expanded and improved village had grown to 526 inhabitants, with 22 haddock boats and 23 larger herring boats working from the harbour for the seasonal fisheries (March to July, and July to September respectively). 12 boats were employed during the winter months in the cod and white fisheries.

Harbour widening followed in 1878, and by 1881 there were 200 drifters based at Boddam. However, in an ironic twist this very growth led to an inevitable decline as Peterhead lying just to the north benefited from the far greater harbour space available for the continually growing fishing fleet.

On 4 October 1881 7 fisherman, including the skipper, William Walker, were lost on the "Alice" in the storm generally referred to as the Eyemouth Disaster. Their bodies were washed up in the Firth of Forth and they are buried together in Inveresk churchyard.

Fishery Statistics

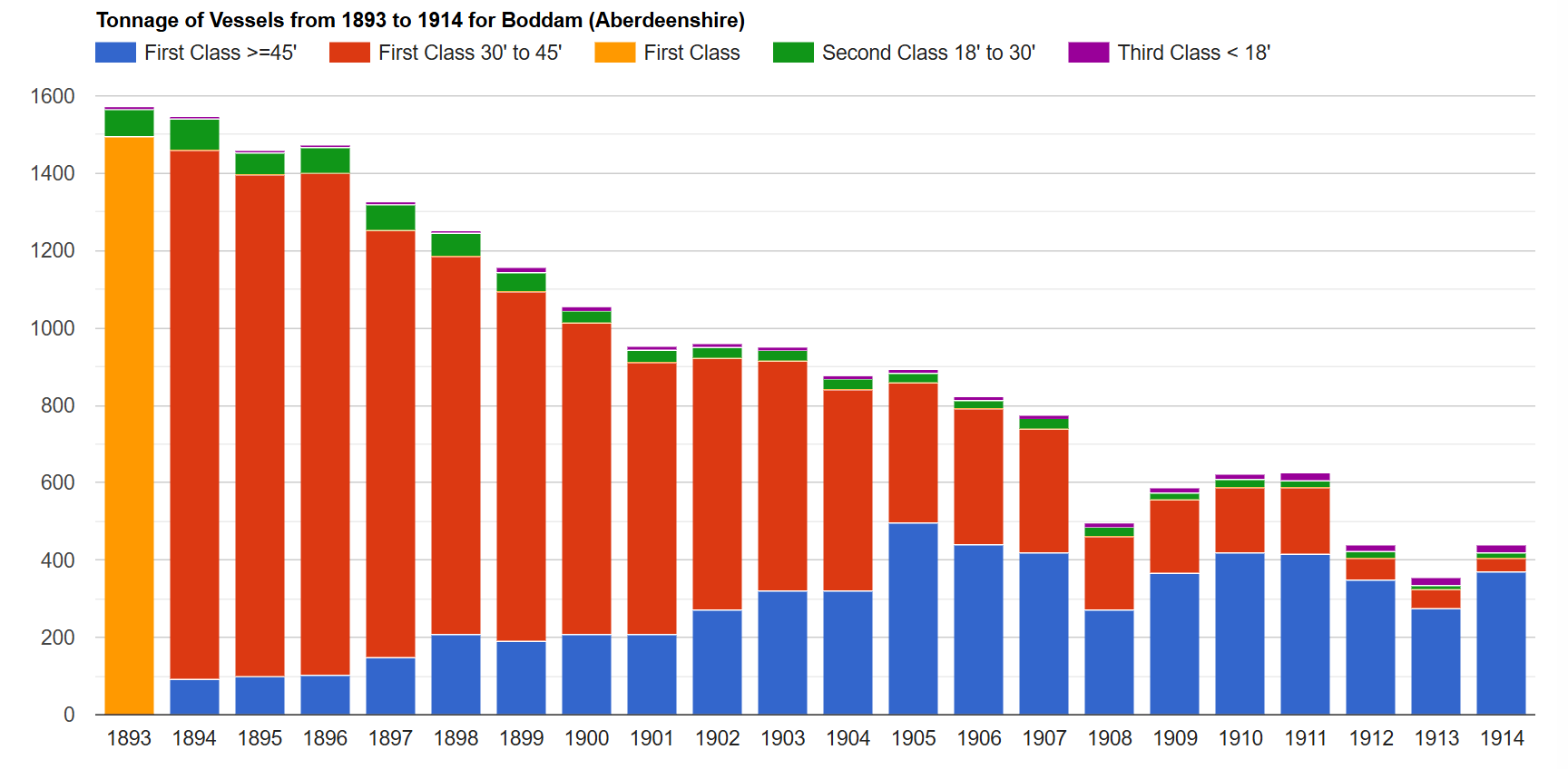
Tonnage of vessels

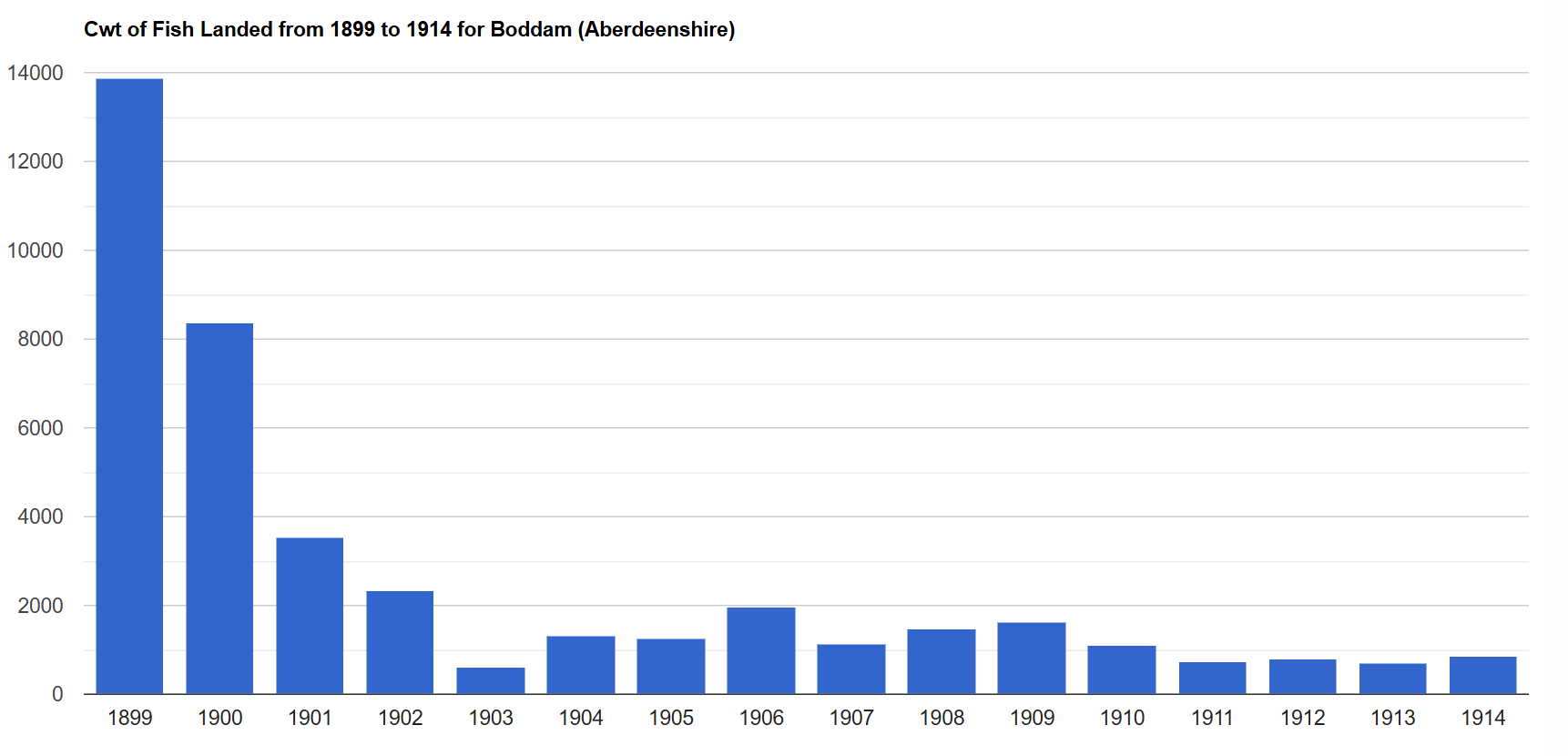
Cwt of fish landed

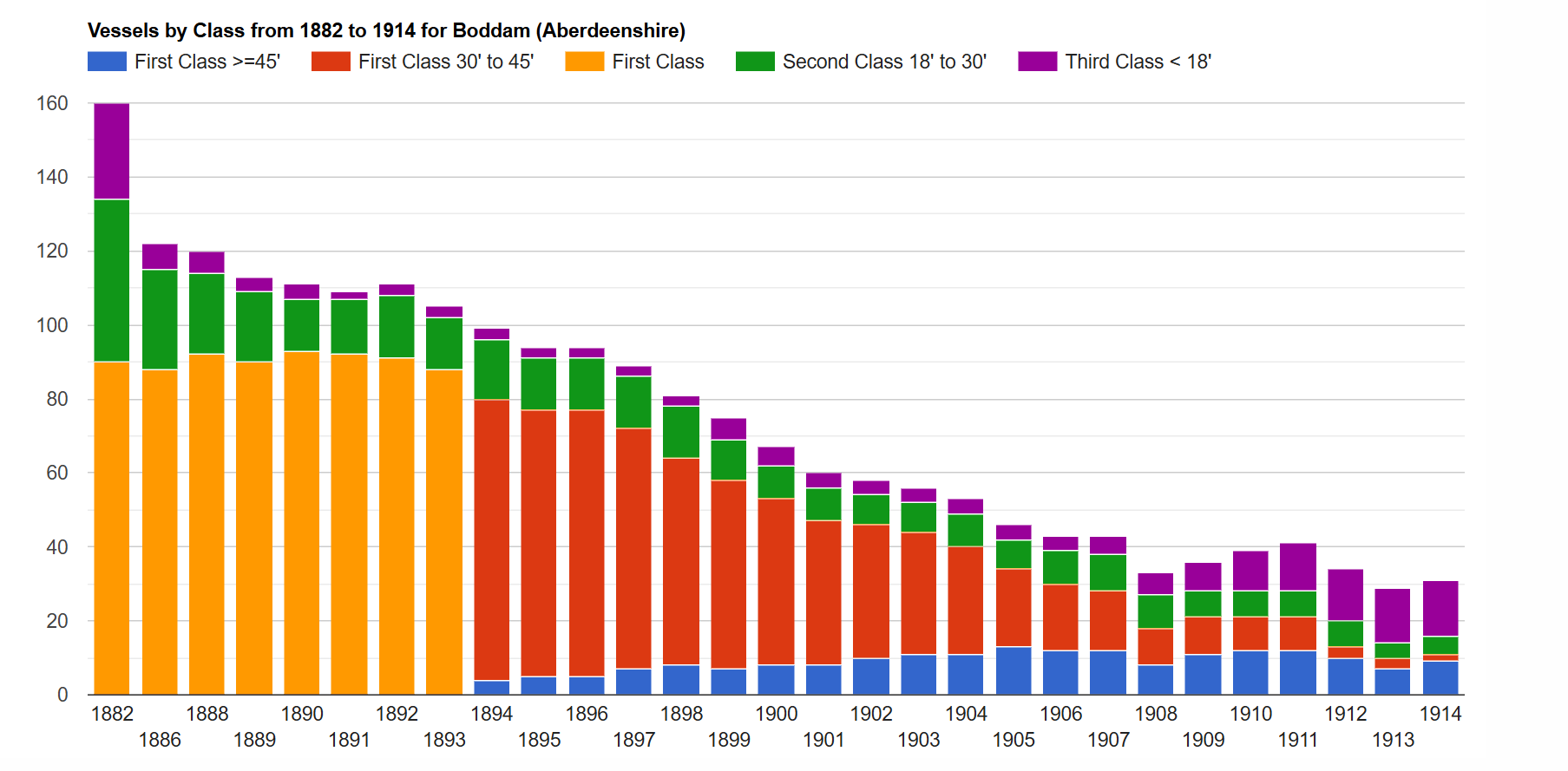
Vessels by class

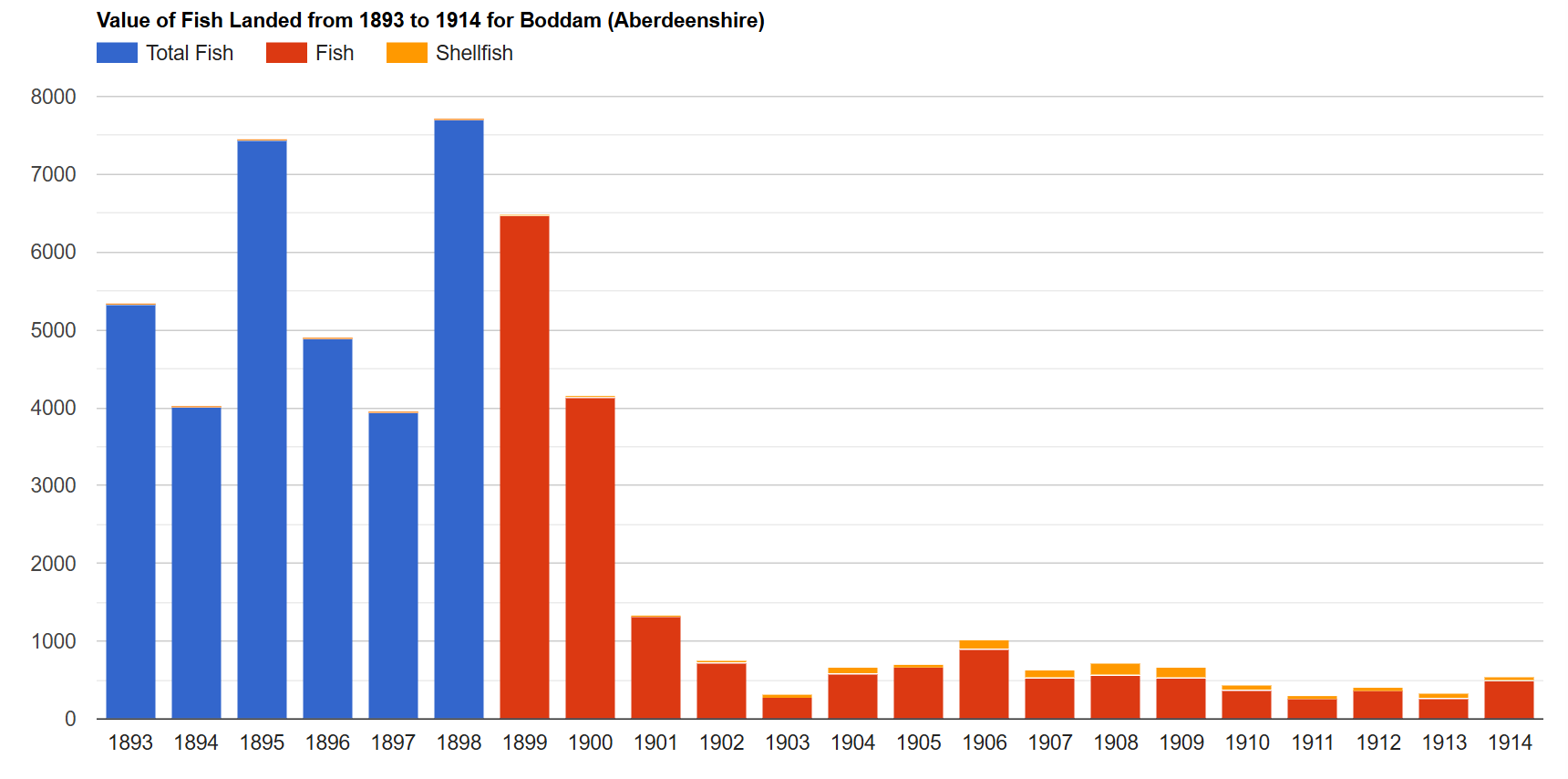
Value (£) of fish landed

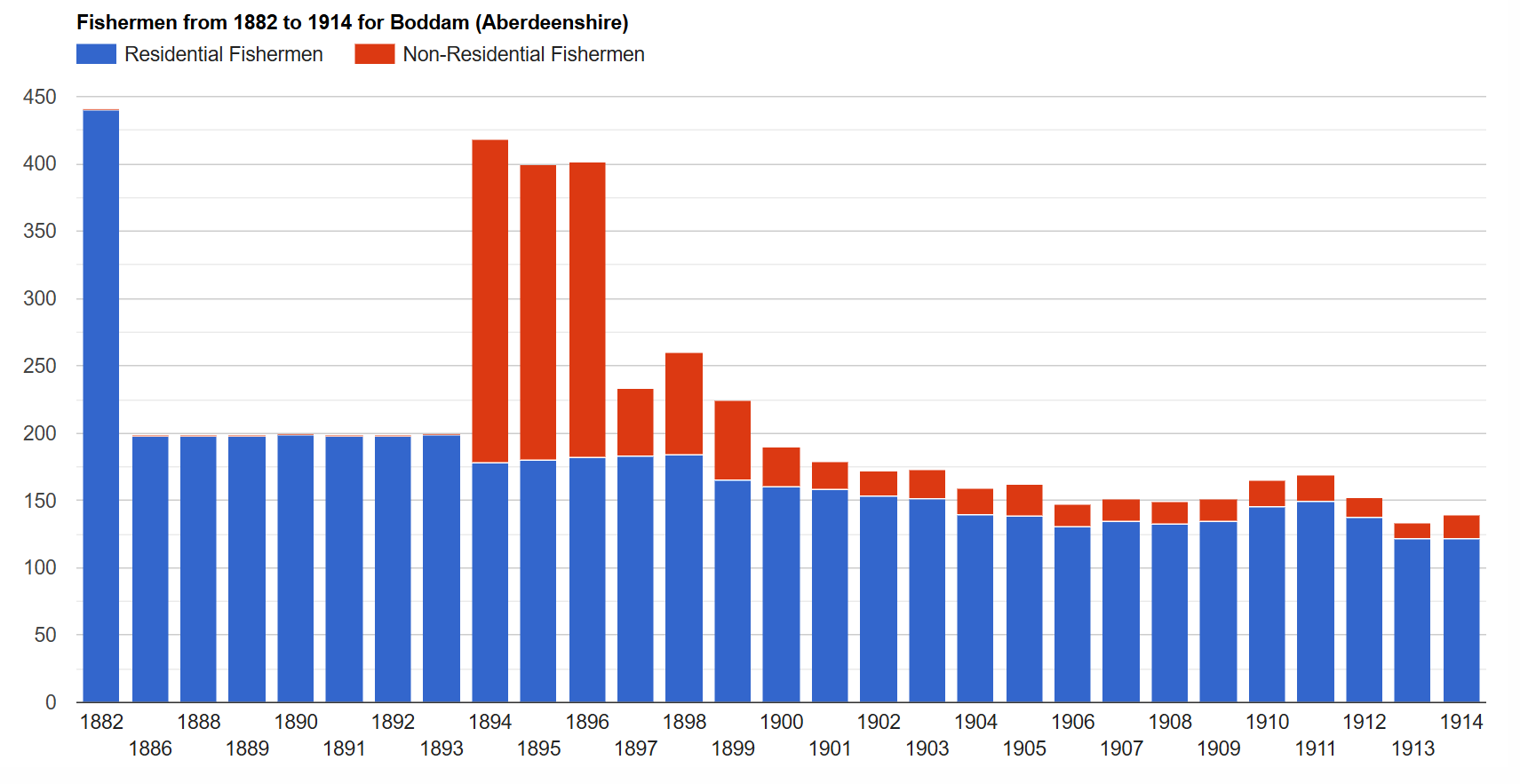
Fishermen

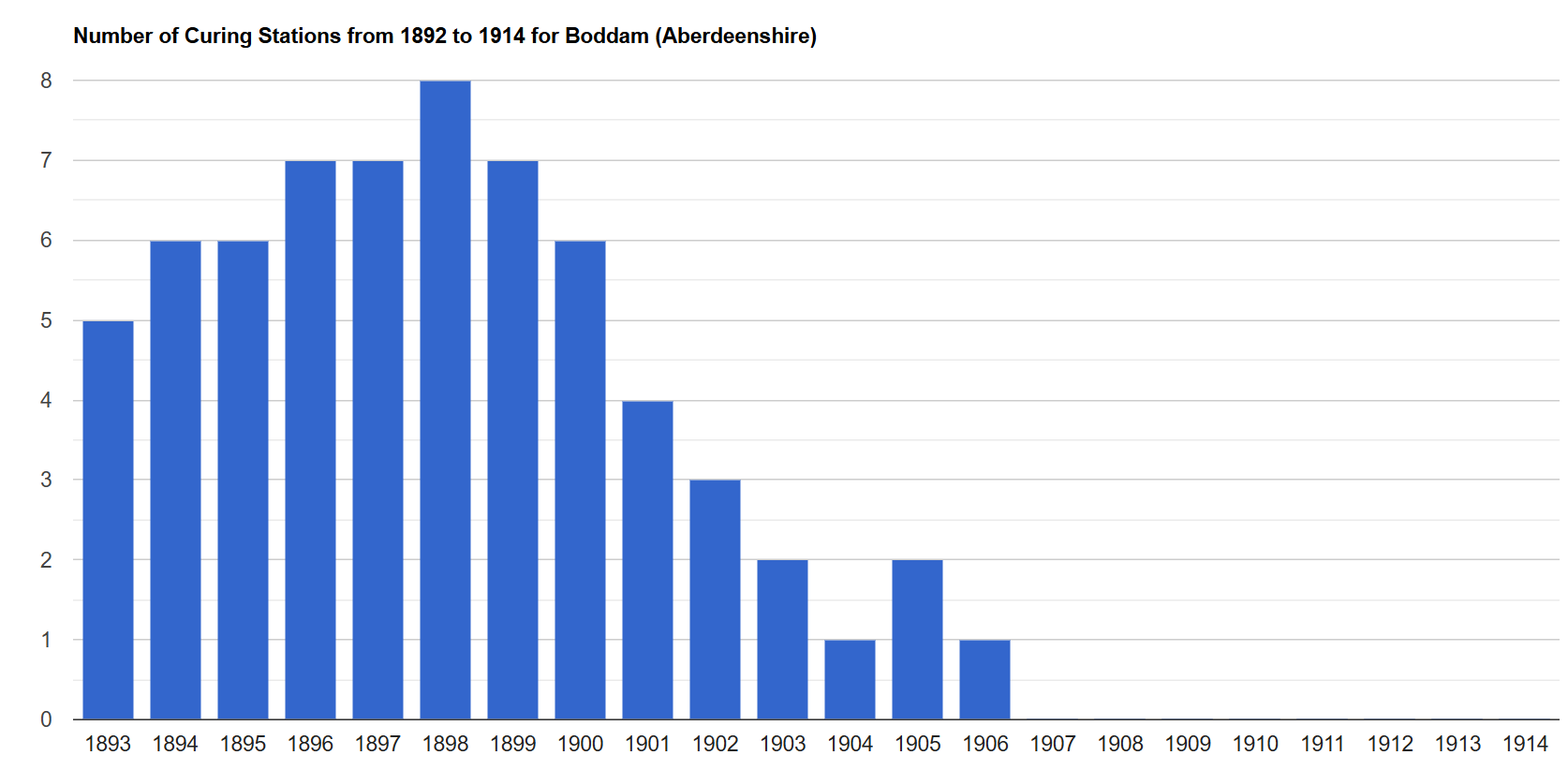
Number of curing stations

== Buchan Ness Lighthouse ==
Buchan Ness Lighthouse
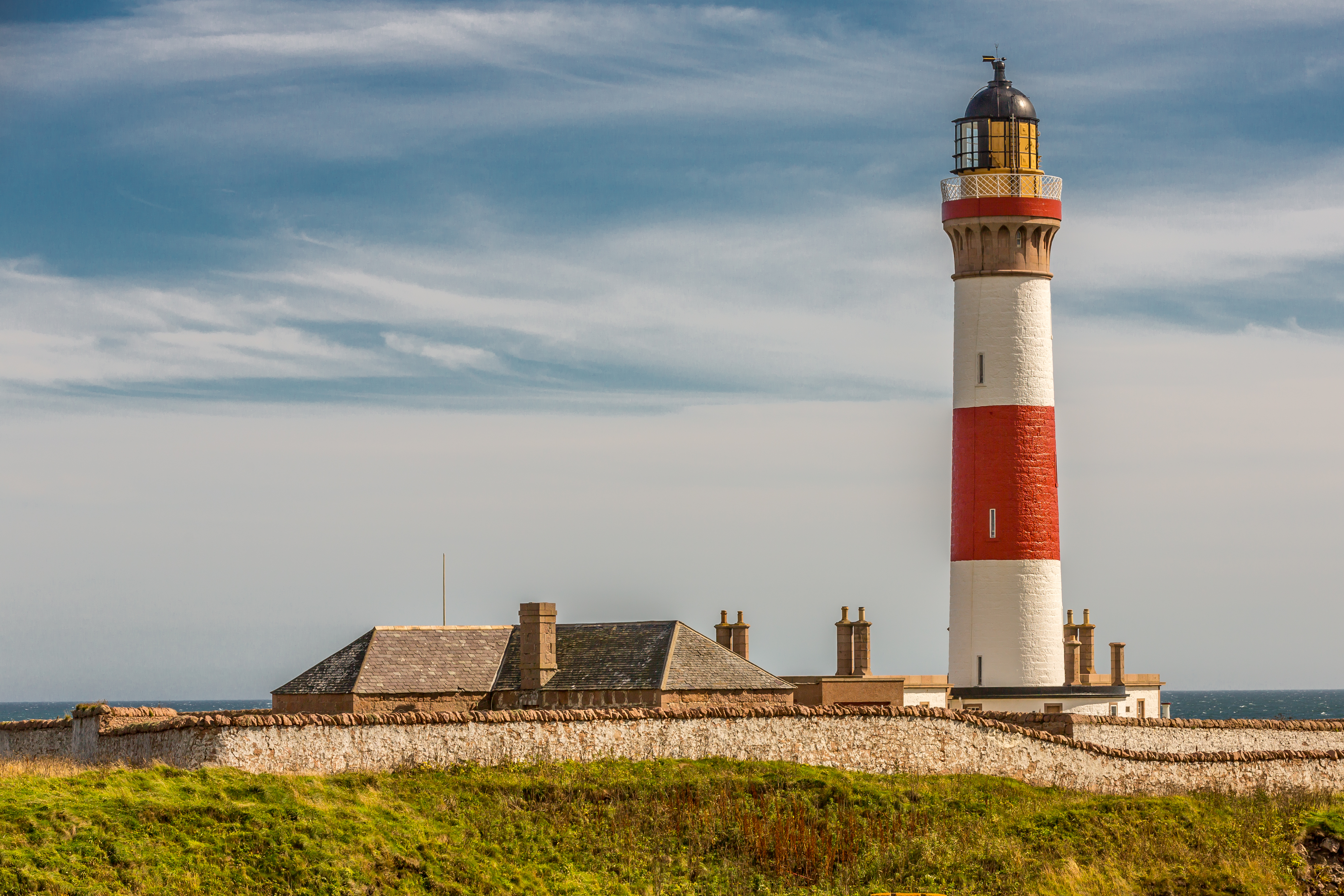
- Buchan Ness (also spelled Buchanness) Lighthouse
- Location: Boddam; Aberdeenshire; Scotland
- OS grid: NK1362442263
- Coordinates: 57.470449°N 1.774452°W

Tower
- Constructed: 1824
- Built by: Robert Stevenson
- Construction: granite tower
- Automated: 1988
- Height: 36 metres (118 ft)
- Shape: cylindrical tower with balcony and lantern
- Markings: white tower with a red band, red balcony, black lantern
- Power source: mains electricity
- Operator: Buchan Ness Lighthouse Holidays
- Heritage: HES: Cat.A - LB16367 - 16/04/1971
- Fog signal: Siren - Installed in 1904 with 3 blasts every 90 sec. Nicknamed: Boddam Coo. 1989 replaced by an Electric emitter. Discontinued in 2000
- Racon: O(---) 14 M

Light
- Focal height: 40 metres (130 ft)
- Lens: hyperradiant Fresnel lens
- Light source: Electric Flashing Mains Powered Biform LED Optic
- Intensity: 2,000,000 cd
- Range: 18 nautical miles (33 km; 21 mi)
- Characteristic: Fl. W 5s 40m 18M Buchan Ness [Fl. 0.3s, ec. 4.7s]

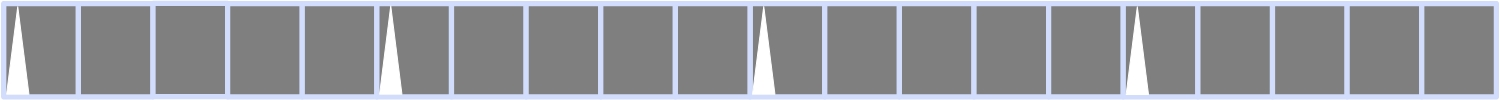

The area around the headland of Buchan Ness was for many centuries the point from which trading and whaling voyages departed across open ocean, bound for Archangel, Greenland and Spitsbergen amongst other destinations.

Over time, many vessels had been run aground in poor weather and in 1819 petitions were sent to the Northern Lighthouse Board to erect a lighthouse in the vicinity. As Engineer to the board, Robert Stevenson decided upon the present location; the granite-built construction being completed in 1824 and the light established in 1827.

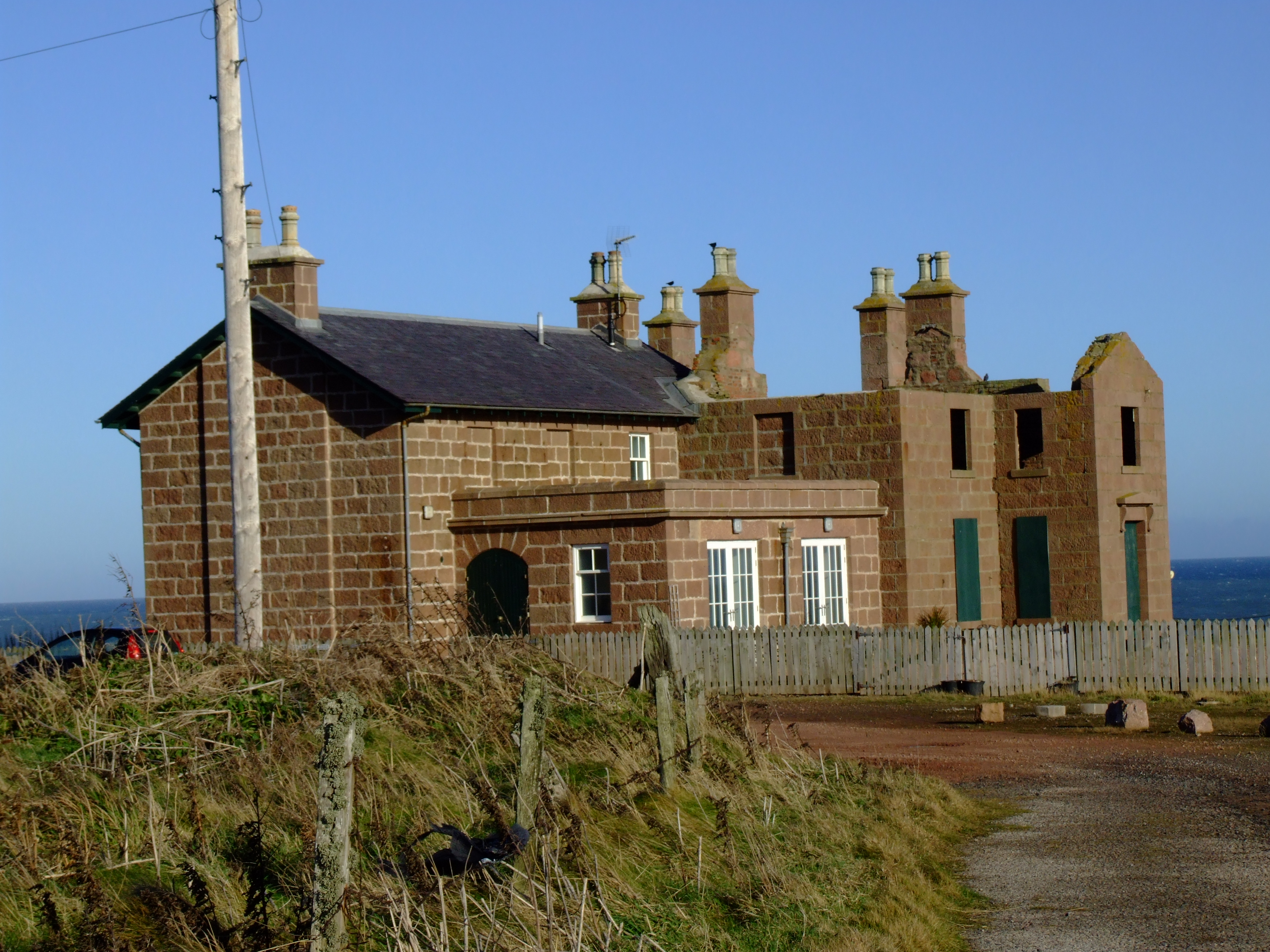
Buchanness Lodge Marine Villa, 2010

The red band was painted in 1907 to help passing ships determine their location and for many years a foghorn (locally known as the Boddam Coo or also as the Boddam Bear, prior to reequipping in 1978) was installed, this being officially turned off in 2000.

The lighthouse is 118 ft (36 m) high, flashing a white light every five seconds which with the current lamp is visible for 28 nautical miles (52 km).

The ruins are visible on the promontory of Buchanness Lodge, an Italianate marine villa built in 1840 by John Smith for Lord Aberdeen. Below the consoled pediment of the main door is inscribed procul negotiis beautus, which, roughly translated, means "lucky is the man who stays away from business".

== Arrival of the railway ==
Although the railway reached Peterhead via Maud in 1862, it was not until 2 August 1897 that the Boddam branch line from Ellon to Boddam via Cruden Bay was opened by the Great North of Scotland Railway Company.

The financial performance of the branch line, and of the Cruden Bay Hotel were disappointing, and the line was closed to passengers during the Great Depression in 1932. Goods traffic continued for a time, but the entire branch line was closed completely; Boddam Station finally being closed to all traffic on the last day of 1948.

Prior to the arrival of the branch from Ellon, the Government had constructed a line covering the two and a half miles between Peterhead prison and the Stirlinghill quarries in order to obtain granite for construction of the breakwater across Peterhead Bay. At the time this was the only state-owned railway in the United Kingdom.

== RAF Buchan ==
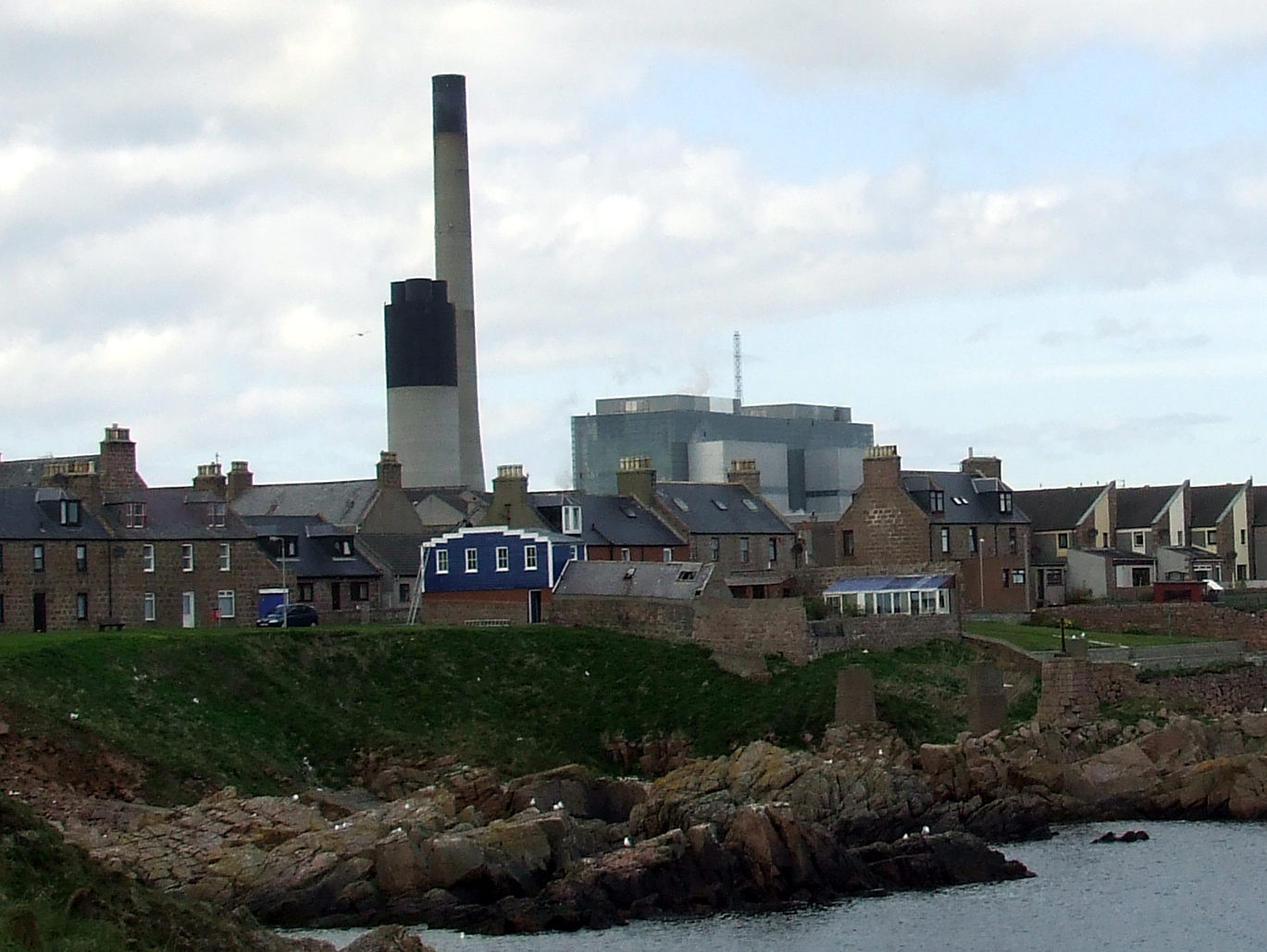
Peterhead power station as seen from Boddam

Following the opening of the nearby radar station at RAF Buchan in 1952, a domestic site was opened on the site of the former railway terminus. The domestic site was closed in 2005 and sold to a private company. The RAF Buchan operational site is retained by the Royal Air Force and known as Remote Radar Head Buchan.

== Peterhead Power Station ==
Adjacent to the north side of the village is Peterhead Power Station (generating capacity: 2,390MW, limited to 1,550MW) on which construction commenced in May 1973, being brought into operation in 1980. Originally intended as a gas-powered station, it was later converted to burn gas or oil and is currently powered by the entire gas supply of the Miller Field.

Sea bass may be caught in the vicinity of the warm water outlets, to which they are attracted.

== Present day ==
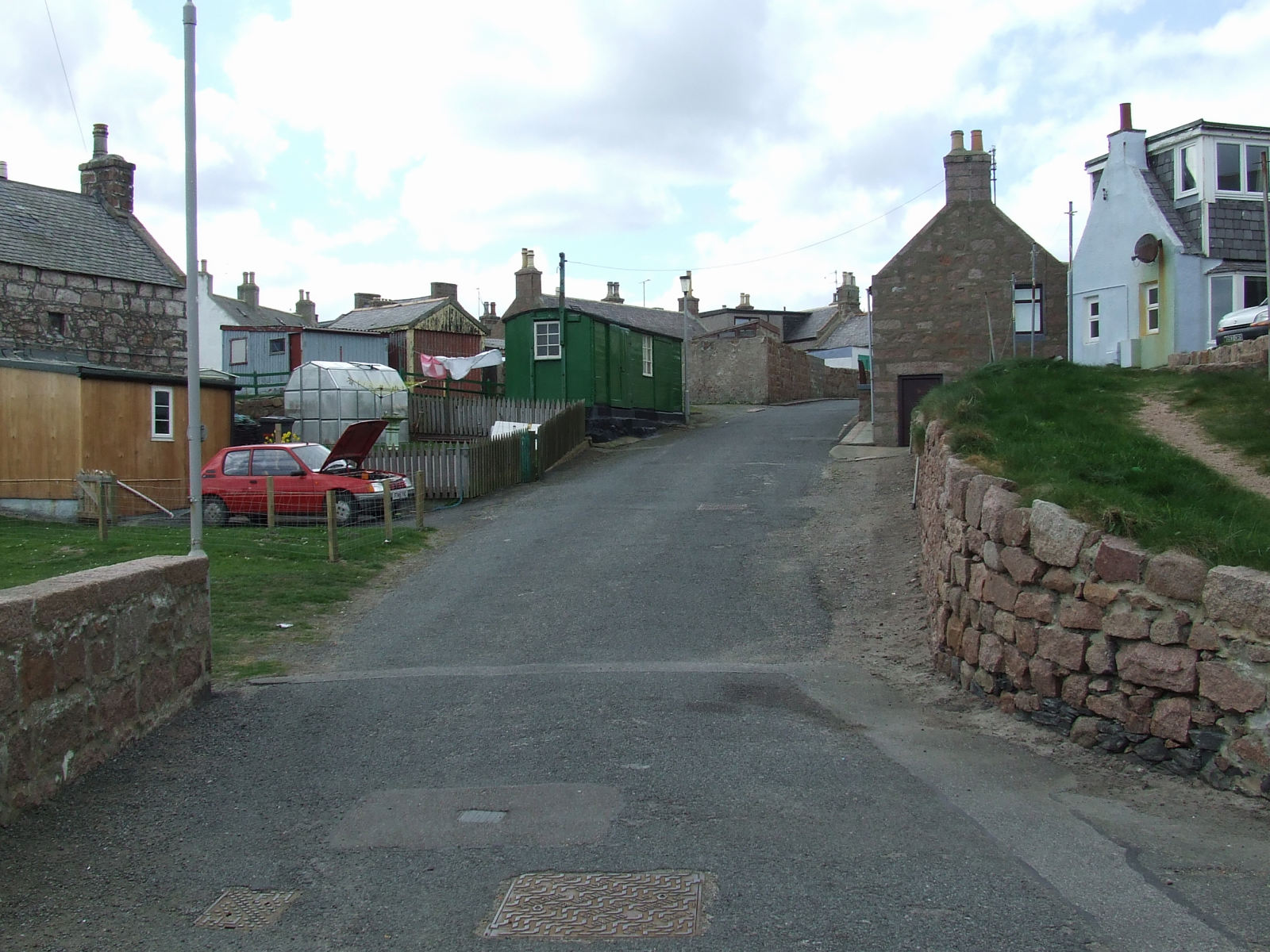
Former fishing cottages and outbuildings with converted railway wagon

Today, Boddam serves largely as a commuter settlement for Aberdeen and Peterhead although an involvement in the fishing industry still continues on a small scale, in particular for lobster.

Despite Boddam and Stirling Village possessing three hotels or inns, tourism in the area is at a low level.

The remains of Boddam Castle lie in a ruinous state, although Earl's Lodge, for many years a hotel and which had previously been gutted in a fire, was repaired as a private home in 2006.

Information boards for the castle were erected around 2005 and in 2012, and Keith Clan reunions from America were invited to visit whilst in the area.

The village has yet retained public facilities such a post office, two hotels and an inn, a library, fish and chip shop, local shop, two car garages, a public hall and a local primary school.

An innovative carbon capture scheme at the power station which had previously been shelved was brought back onto the agenda in late 2007 with the hope of new jobs for the local populace.

== Monkey ==
A traditional song relates how a monkey was the only survivor from a local shipwreck and thus the villagers of Boddam could not claim salvage rights as those only applied when all had perished. One version of the first verse thus relates,

A ship went out along the coast,
And all the men on board were lost,
Except the monkey, who climbed the mast,
And the Boddamers hinged the monkey O!

- Traditional

The recently renamed "Noose and Monkey" pub in Aberdeen recalls this event rather than the infamous monkey-hanging stated to have occurred in Hartlepool during the Napoleonic Wars. Indeed, Fiona-Jane Brown of the University of Aberdeen, has suggested that the Hartlepool tale actually originates from an event in Boddam in 1772. She claims that a popular song about the Boddam incident was adapted over many years as it travelled down the east coast, eventually spawning a Hartlepool version.

The song relating to the latter dates no earlier than the 1850s, from famous Geordie comic singer Ned Corvan who had toured the Scottish Lowlands and may have used the Boddam tale as his basis, perhaps influenced by the intense rivalry between Hartlepool and Old Hartlepool, at the time a separate settlement, to deride the latter.

Indeed, Boddamers for many years after the event were often (and sometimes still are) taunted by the cry "Fa hangit the monkey?!" ("Who hanged the monkey?") from residents of Peterhead.
